= List of Excel Saga episodes =

Excel Saga
- Cover of the Volume 1 DVD, Released by ADV Films
- Native name
- Kanji: エクセル♥サーガ
- Revised Hepburn: Ekuseru Sāga
- No. of episodes: 26

Release
- Original network: TV Tokyo
- Original release: October 7, 1999 – March 30, 2000

Excel Saga is an anime adaptation of the manga by Koshi Rikudo. The series was produced by J.C.Staff and directed by Shinichi Watanabe. It aired on TV Tokyo from October 7, 1999, to March 30, 2000, for 26 episodes. At the publisher's request, the anime series follows a different storyline from the manga; Rikdo was pleased with the adaptation. To balance the removal of Rikudou's original material, Watanabe added his own alter ego, Nabeshin, and expanded several elements, including increasing Pedro's role and expanding on the concept of the Great Will. The twenty-sixth episode, "Going Too Far", never aired in Excel Saga's original run on TV Tokyo because it was purposefully too violent and obscene for broadcast in Japan.

The series is licensed for an English-language release in North America and the United Kingdom by ADV Films, and in Australia and New Zealand by Madman Entertainment. The ADV Films English dub of the series was aired on the Anime Network in the United States, and on the Sci Fi Channel and Rapture TV in the United Kingdom. In North America, ADV released the series on six DVDs between June 11, 2002, and April 8, 2003. A complete collection of the series was released on July 6, 2004, as "Excel Saga - The Imperfect Collection" and re-released in different packaging on August 1, 2006, as "Excel Saga - Complete Collection". In the UK, the series was released between May 19, 2003, and March 15, 2004. The complete series was later released as "Excel Saga - Complete Box Set" on July 2, 2007,

The series uses two pieces of theme music by "Excel Girls". The opening theme, "Love (Loyalty)" (「愛(忠誠心)」, "Ai (Chūseishin)"), consists of the singers speculating on the nature of love. The closing theme, "Menchi's Bolero of Sorrow" (「メンチの哀愁のボレロ」, "Menchi no Aishū no Borero") consists of a series of barks from the canine character Menchi.

== Episode list ==
No.	Title	Original release date
1	"The Koshi Rikdo Assassination Plot"; Transliteration: "Rikudō Kōshi Satsugai Keigaku" (Japanese: 六道神士殺害計画)	October 7, 1999
Ilpalazzo desires to exterminate the world's manga artists, ordering Excel to start with Rikdo Koshi, but she is thwarted by the intervention of the Great Will of the Macrocosm and her own conscience. After chatting with Pedro, the immigrant worker, and chasing down dinner, Excel makes a second attempt on Rikdo's life.
2	"The Woman from Mars"; Transliteration: "Kasei kara Kita Onna" (Japanese: 火星から来た女)	October 14, 1999
In the fashion of sci-fi movies. Reinforcements from ACROSS Headquarters turn out to be an invasion by the incredibly cute but deceptively tyrannic Puchuu Imperium, and Excel stages a brave, if somewhat misguided, raid on their Mothership. Meanwhile, Nabeshin is also aboard in order to help an old friend escape the clutches of the Puchuus. At the end, the aerial alien invasion force is destroyed, Excel is being held as a prisoner of war, and Ilpalazzo admits Hyatt to ACROSS' ranks.
3	"The Sacrificial Lamb of the Venomous Great Escape of Hell"; Transliteration: "Jigoku no Dokudoku Dai Dassō no Ikenie" (Japanese: 地獄の毒々大脱走のいけにえ)	October 21, 1999
In the fashion of an action B-movie (including letterboxing), Excel is trapped in the jungle after the Puchuu mothership was destroyed. Hyatt is dispatched to find her, meeting her neighbor Watanabe on the way. Excel's captors are some very manly and gruesome troops (with a soft spot for dogs), but Nabeshin has some unfinished business with them and with Excel's fellow prisoner who is revealed to be Maetel from Galaxy Express 999.
4	"Love Puny"; Transliteration: "Rabu Hena" (Japanese: ラブへな)	October 28, 1999
A spoof of the romantic comedy genre of anime, Watanabe sets his sights on Hyatt, his thoughts paralleling the choices offered in a dating simulation game – but fate and Ilpalazzo are playing games with him (rather literally). Meanwhile, Excel is searching for Hyatt, but both are caught up in more explosive trouble due to Nabeshin and the Gold Syndicate's new bomb type.
5	"The Interesting Giant Tower"; Transliteration: "Omoshiroi Kyotō" (Japanese: おもしろい巨塔)	November 4, 1999
In a parody of dramas about social problems, Excel and Hyatt infiltrate City Hall to gather dirt on the corrupt politicians. In the course of their investigations, they encounter Dr. Kapabu, who controls F City's leaders and has no qualms about removing obstacles with violence. Kabapu creates the Department of City Security in order to defend the city from future threats (with embezzled funds), and hires Watanabe, who pins his romantic hopes on a government job, as well as Iwata and Sumiyoshi, who just wanted to tag along with Watanabe. ACROSS scores a victory of sorts, with the help of green drink-induced zombies and bathroom scribbles.
6	"The Cold is Winter! Snowed under Episode"; Transliteration: "Samu ga Fuyuize! Sōnan-hen" (Japanese: 寒が冬いぜ!!〜遭難編〜)	November 11, 1999
This episode is a parody of the survival movie genre. ACROSS plans to set up a laser cannon in the mountains in order to terrify F City into submission and at the mercy of the idealist organization – however, due to her usual stupidity and the sub-zero arctic environment, things don't go as Ilpalazzo has planned. Meanwhile, Watanabe, Iwata and Sumiyoshi are sent on a training exercise in the same mountains, and meet their new co-worker, the sexy but fierce Misaki Matsuya, who becomes Iwata's new fetish.
7	"Melody of the Underground Passage"; Transliteration: "Chikadō no Merodi" (Japanese: 地下道のメロディ)	November 18, 1999
In a parody of monster horror movies, the Puchuu shock troops have penetrated F City's sewers, and Kabapu's new Department of City Security is closing in on ACROSS' HQ! Excel and Hyatt try to deal with the two-front situation at arm's length, but hands-on action is required – including an Alien Queen who breeds more Puchuus as reinforcements.
8	"Increase Ratings Week"; Transliteration: "Shichōritsu Kyōka Shūkan" (Japanese: 視聴率強化週間)	November 25, 1999
In a bout of pure fanservice, the girls chill out at the pool. Everyone is in their best poolside attire – except Excel, who gets stuck with a decidedly un-stylish high school swimsuit. Things get even worse for Excel when she gorges herself into a bloated, immobile state on free food provided by their new friend, Cosette – who is not quite as innocent as she appears. No men are fully shown in this episode, except Rikdo, briefly and to approve the experiment, Nabeshin to hold up ending signs to the Beauty Theaters (and getting hurt), and Pedro, with the rest – including Ilpalazzo – at the end.
9	"Bowling Girls"; Transliteration: "Bōringu Musume" (Japanese: ボウリング娘)	December 2, 1999
In a parody of the sports anime genre, Excel and Hyatt infiltrate a bowling alley in order to understand Japan's youth through (what Excel mistakenly thinks is) their most popular sport. Things become far too exciting when a bowling-fanatic terrorist organization hijacks the alley and the late-night, low-rated TV show Bowling Girls. This episode has a substantial role for the Excel Girls, an animated rendition of the two female artists who sing the opening theme.
10	"Elegy to the Dogs (Menchi's Great Adventure)"; Transliteration: "Menchi no Daibōken" (Japanese: メンチの大冒険)	December 9, 1999
In a homage to animal shows, Menchi has escaped, having had enough of her role as ACROSS' emergency rations. She soon joins a pack of helpful strays, who undertake the quest to return Menchi to her former owner. Little does she know the storm of betrayal and vengeance approaching her and her new friends.
11	"Butt Out, Youth!"; Transliteration: "Hikkome! Seishun!" (Japanese: ひっこめ! 青春)	December 16, 1999
This episode is a parody of the teen drama genre. In order to learn more about the education system, Excel and Hyatt infiltrate Excel's alma mater, Inunabe High School – the school in which Excel has graduated from, which means Excel herself, with Hyatt, is paying a return visit. The ACROSS duo quickly whip their class of thugs and degenerates into shape. They next have to save the school baseball team, and to do so Excel tries to recruit the team's legendary dropout, Bean Boy.
12	"Big City Part II"; Transliteration: "Daishigai Pāto Tsū" (Japanese: 大市街Part II)	December 23, 1999
This episode is a parody of the detective anime genre. It's Christmas Eve in F City, F District, and Kabapu orders the Department of City Security to shadow a cute, but possessed detective, named Purin (プリン, lit. 'Pudding'), who's out for revenge on her father's killers. At the same time, Hyatt is taken hostage by some extremely incompetent bank-robbers.
13	"The New Year's-End Party Hidden Talent Contest"; Transliteration: "Shinshun Toshiwasure Kakushigei Taikai" (Japanese: 新春年忘れかくし芸大会)	January 6, 2000
A recap of the series to present, in the form of a Japanese New Year's television special, in which Hyatt and Excel compete to determine the New Year's Winner. The contest is judged by Excel Saga celebrities, and Ilpalazzo endeavors to provide some entertainment, but is exceptionally frustrated by the world's ongoing corruption – and interference by the Excel Girls.
14	"Prop"; Transliteration: "Tekoire" (Japanese: テコイレ)	January 13, 2000
In a desperate effort to raise ratings, the animators give the Department of City Security a new member: Ropponmatsu Unit 1, a beautiful, bionic robotic bombshell of a bomb-disposal expert, who becomes Iwata's new fetish. The timing is auspicious, since the agents of ACROSS are planning to deliver a bomb to City Hall. While they fail in their task, City Security loses Ropponmatsu in the encounter.
15	"More! Prop Memorial"; Transliteration: "Motto! Tekoire Memoriaru" (Japanese: もっと! てこいれメモリアル)	January 20, 2000
Ropponmatsu returns, but Iwata is furious to discover that the new Ropponmatsu, Unit 2, is in the shape of a young, annoying and mentally irritating cat-girl. Following in her predecessor Unit's footsteps, Ropponmatsu Unit 2 engages Ilpalazzo's newest bomb-delivery system, a mobile bomb, the T-10000 – in reality Excel disguised as a large panda bear to avoid attention and suspicion. Things look bad for little Unit 2, but fortunately Ropponmatsu Unit 1 returns in the nick of time.
16	"Take Back Love!"; Transliteration: "AI o Torimodose!" (Japanese: AIをとりもどせ!)	January 27, 2000
This episode is a parody of the yuri genre. Due to a fatal programming error made by Gojo, the two Ropponmatsus fall in love with the ACROSS girls, leading to a robotic crime spree, a para-military showdown, and an indecent assault by Unit 2 on Excel. The title is a reference to the theme song of the Fist of the North Star anime series.
17	"Animation USA"; Transliteration: "Animēshon Yū Esu Ei" (Japanese: アニメーションUSA)	February 3, 2000
In a parody of Americanized anime, Excel and Hyatt are sent by Ilpalazzzo to reconnoiter in the United States, but Excel's poor English starts them on the wrong foot with the locals in the Land of the Free. Fortunately, they are rescued by none other than Pedro's son, Sandora, who has run away from home. Later, Excel must marshal the combined powers of American and Japanese animation to confront and conquer the ever-growing army of the New York Mafia.
18	"Municipal Force Daitenzin"; Transliteration: "Shiritsu Sentai Daitenzin" (Japanese: 市立戦隊ダイテンジン)	February 10, 2000
The Department of City Security is outfitted with the latest in Sentai suit technology to contain and eliminate every threat to the city even more effectively. They now are able to blow up anything with this new technology, and promptly do so – thus resulting in things gone out of hand all around the city, unless they find a way to remove the Daitarn suits. This episode references Rikdo's earlier manga, which bore the same title.
19	"Menchi's Great Adventure 2: Around the World in 80 Hours"; Transliteration: "Menchi no Daibōken Ni: Hachijūjikan Sekai Isshū" (Japanese: メンチの大冒険2〜80時間世界一周〜)	February 17, 2000
This episode is another homage to animal shows. Menchi makes a trip around the world with a young industry heiress, who, when she isn't plugging Alps Electric, is being hunted by an evil and bloodthirsty assassin, who has a score to settle with Menchi, too. Meanwhile, Hyatt and her senior are sent by Ilpalazzo on a world-spanning mission to find special objects that would ensure the final victory of ACROSS over all else once and for all.
20	"The Best of Mr. Pedro"; Transliteration: "Yorinuki Pedoro-san" (Japanese: よりぬきペドロさん)	February 24, 2000
This episode recaps all that has happened to Pedro since the Koshi Rikdo Assassination Plan: his death, supernatural affair with the Great Will, discovery of his family's betrayal with Gomez, and his drowning by That Man. It also advances his subplot by showing just how sinister and powerful That Man is. Nabeshin and Sandora arrive to help, to dubious but comedic effect.
21	"Visually Appealing Type"; Transliteration: "Bijuaru Kei" (Japanese: 美濡歩K)	March 2, 2000
In a parody of the musical genre, ACROSS Headquarters dispatches instructions to Ilpalazzo, carried by Key, a stereotype of Japanese rock stars. He insists on delivering his message via song, even though his heart won't let him perform. Key stays with the girls, sending Excel's libido into an uncontrollable frenzy. A phallic guitar, Excel's visions of yaoi action, and Key's delivery of the instructions all conspire to snap Ilpalazzo directly into action.
22	"Invasion, Mother"; Transliteration: "Shinryaku, Ofukurosama" (Japanese: 侵略、おふくろ様)	March 9, 2000
This episode involves the main characters finally completing their goal of conquering the city. The Puchuu Empire is back (again), in full force, and led by their Overlord to once and for all erase the Earth of all life as a payback for the destruction of one of their Motherships and the Tunnel Incident. In a fully armed, firepower-packed parody of Mobile Suit Gundam and the works of Leiji Matsumoto (complete with Puchuu versions of Captain Harlock and Char Aznable), Excel leads Rebel Puchuu forces, led by the Puchuu Rebel captain, in a desperate defense of Earth, resulting in the scenic – and outrageously insane – Puchuu Civil War that, in the end, results in the annihilation of F City, F Prefecture, the colony debris reducing the once tall and prosperous city ACROSS sought to conquer into a wreckaged graveyard of its past glory and life.
23	"Legend of the End of the Century Conqueror"; Transliteration: "Seikimatsu Seifukusha Densetsu" (Japanese: 世紀末征服者伝説)	March 16, 2000
A parody of Fist of the North Star: F City hasn't been the same since the Puchuu Civil War have reduced most of the city into nothing more than ruins. Citizens, fearing the resulting destruction and the coming times, live in scattered villages, and gangs roam the deserted wastelands, pillaging and conquering all before them. There is one person standing for justice, and that person is Excel. After dispatching with the gang leader (with a powerful, anthropomorphic attack), Excel continues her search for her Lord, Ilpalazzo, but tragedy ensues.
24	"For You, I Could Die"; Transliteration: "Kimi no Tame nara Shineru" (Japanese: きみのためなら死ねる)	March 23, 2000
The Department of City Security has survived the Fall of F City, and Excel is recovering under their care, but she can't remember anything at all – she is obviously suffering from amnesia from her last ill-fated meeting with Ilpalazzo. She watches the Daitenzin head to their final confrontation with ACROSS and sets out on her own mission: to regain all of her memories and take ultimate revenge. This is the only "serious" episode in the series, following Rikdo's order to remove all the gags. However, a few gags still remain.
25	"We Will Not Be Held Responsible"; Transliteration: "Yarinige" (Japanese: やりにげ)	March 30, 2000
Rikdo gives permission to end the series. Featuring Kabapu's tax-funded, politically incorrect Mech, the Ballistik Buddy, this episode leads to several final confrontations: Pedro and Nabeshin battle That Man for the fates of the Great Will, Pedro's wife, and the whole Universe. Back in the ruins of F City, the Daitenzin storm Ilpalazzo's "Mobile Fortress", while Excel wanders through it, searching to make herself whole once more. Watanabe gets the courage to confess his love to Hyatt, who has a different confession to make. The Daitenzin snatch victory from the jaws of defeat, and Excel and Ilpalazzo have their climactic reunion.
26	"Going Too Far"; Transliteration: "Yarisugi" (Japanese: やりすぎ)	Unaired (Note: Never aired in Excel Saga's original run-on TV Tokyo because it was purposefully too violent, obscene, and exactly one minute too long for broadcast in Japan. One network that did broadcast this episode, however, was Animax in Latin America. The opening sequence is altered to contain pixelated nudity and more blood, and the closing presents the translator on fours, wearing a collar, and singing the "Bolero", as Menchi translates into her own language. The episode itself, in addition to much more violence, blood, and gore, includes situations containing nudity, lesbianism, apparent pedophilia, soaplands, and a love hotel—in several instances involving minors. The episode obliquely refers to the 1995 sarin gas attack on a Tokyo subway by including sarin attacks as a method of exterminating enemies. The director himself remarks that it "felt good to go past the limits of a TV series", although he thinks it "is not something that you should do too often. The episode still be seen on Crunchyroll and the complete series DVD and Blu-ray set".)
This episode involves deliberately putting so many things too unfit to air on TV (in fact, it's exactly one minute too long to air on Japanese TV stations), so it had to be released on DVD. This was the moment everything has come to a close end: the ACROSS Five, That Man's former colleagues, are all slain by Nabeshin. Watanabe finally asks Hyatt out on a date. Ilpalazzo at last starts his own rock band. Pedro is shown fully restored to life, visiting Japan with his wife and son. At the end, Hyatt, and soon everyone else, is overcome and swept away with the happiness she sees around her – along with the blood she oozed. Nabeshin goes to attend the marriage of his life, Kumi-Kumi, who finally relented... only to encounter Koshi Rikdo, the one responsible for the conception of this universe, in one last battle.
