= Konishiki Yasokichi =

American sumo wrestler (born 1963)

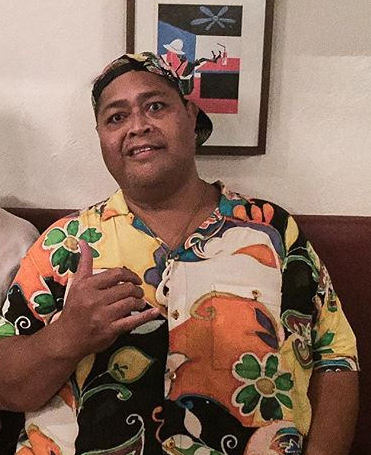
- Konishiki in 2015

Personal information
- Native name: 小錦 八十吉
- Born: Saleva'a Fuauli Atisano'e; December 31, 1963 (age 62) Honolulu, Oahu, Hawaii, U.S.
- Height: 1.84 m (6 ft 1/2 in)
- Weight: 287 kg (633 lb; 45.2 st)

Sport
- Sport: Sumo
- Retired: November 1997
- Heya: Takasago
- Record: 733–498–95
- Debut: July 1982
- Highest rank: Ōzeki (July 1987)
- Elder name: Sanoyama
- Championships: 3 (Makuuchi); 2 (Jūryō); 1 (Jonidan); 1 (Jonokuchi)
- Special Prizes: Outstanding Performance (4); Fighting Spirit (5); Technique (1)
- Gold Stars: 2 (Chiyonofuji, Takanosato)
- Updated on June 2020

Saleva'a Fuauli Atisano'e (born December 31, 1963), better known by his shikona, Konishiki Yasokichi (小錦八十吉, Konishiki Yasokichi), is an American-born Japanese former professional sumo wrestler. He was the first non-Japanese-born wrestler to reach ōzeki, the second-highest possible rank in the sport. During his career, he won the top division championship on three occasions and came very close to becoming the first foreign-born grand champion, or yokozuna, prompting a social debate in Japan as to whether a foreigner could have the necessary cultural understanding to be deemed acceptable in sumo's ultimate rank. At a peak weight of 287 kg (633 lb) he was also at the time the heaviest wrestler ever in sumo, earning him the nicknames "Meat Bomb" and, most famously, "The Dump Truck".

== Early career ==
Playing truant from school one day, Atisano'e, already 370 pounds or 170 kilograms by the age of eighteen, was spotted on the beach in Hawaii by a sumo talent scout and was offered the chance to go to Japan to train. He entered sumo in July 1982, recruited by another Hawaiian-born wrestler, Takamiyama of the Takasago stable. A promising student at the University High School in Honolulu, Atisano'e initially wanted to be a lawyer and was also offered a music scholarship to Syracuse University. His father had regular work with the US Navy but had to support eight children. Atisano'e regarded Takamiyama as a local hero and found the opportunity to travel to Japan too good to resist, although his parents were reluctant for him to do so.

Due to his potential he was given the name Konishiki, after the 17th Yokozuna, Konishiki Yasokichi I (see List of yokozuna) who came from the same training stable at the end of the nineteenth century, during the Meiji period in Japan, and Konishiki Yasokichi II, a komusubi in the beginning of the twentieth century. Yasokichi was the sixth "Konishiki" in history, though he was the third to reach the top division. He rose to the privileged sekitori ranks in just eight tournaments, and to top division in just twelve, a feat that had thus far only been achieved by Itai.

In July 1984, he made his debut in the top makuuchi division, and in the following tournament in September he defeated two yokozuna, Chiyonofuji and Takanosato, and was runner-up with a 12–3 record. He was promoted to komusubi for the first time in May 1985 and sekiwake in July 1985. However, he suffered an injury to his coccyx, caused by a stool collapsing underneath him, and had to sit out the next tournament. In May 1986, he suffered another injury, this time in competition, when he twisted his knee as a result of a rematch with Futahaguro. Konishiki came back strongly from this setback and three consecutive double figure scores in 1987 earned him promotion to ōzeki.

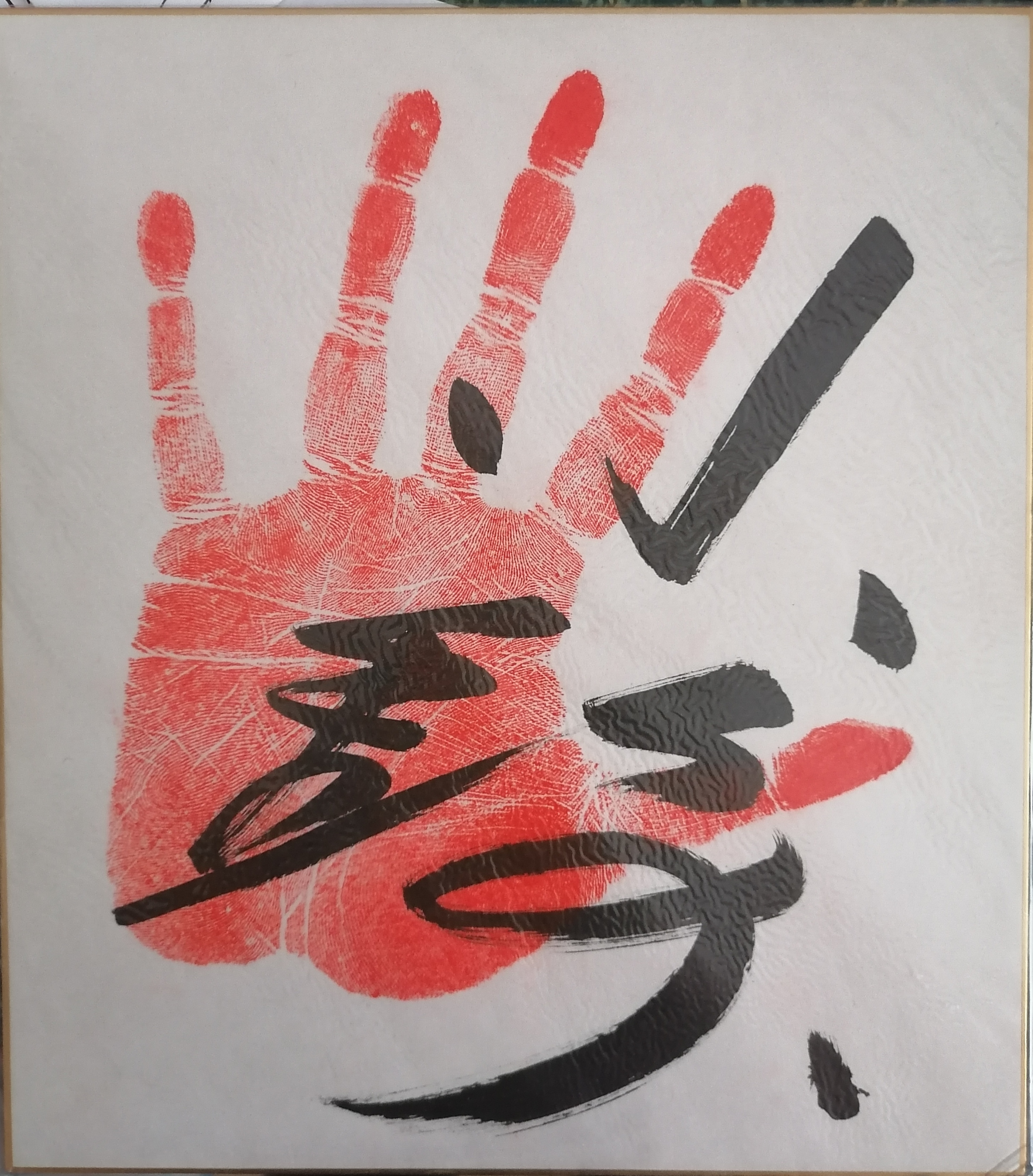
Original tegata (handprint and signature ) of sumo wrestler Konishiki

== Ōzeki ==
Many people expected Konishiki to quickly make his push for yokozuna promotion. His stablemaster, the 46th Yokozuna Asashio Tarō III, had predicted Konishiki would reach the top rank by his 25th birthday. However, his increasing weight caused a strain on his knee, exacerbated by previous high-school football injuries, which badly affected his performances. After a string of mediocre 8–7 scores he turned in a disastrous 3–12 in September 1988.

His problems continued in 1989 and a 5–10 mark in September left him in danger of demotion from ōzeki once again. He made a spectacular comeback in November 1989, taking his first tournament championship with a 14–1 record. He was the first foreigner to win a top division title since Takamiyama in 1972. In March 1990 he took part in a rare three-way playoff for the title, and despite winning the initial bout, he would then lose twice in a row, making Hokutoumi the champion. In May 1991 Konishiki won 14 consecutive bouts but was beaten in a playoff on the final day by Asahifuji.

=== Close to yokozuna ===
By late 1991 Konishiki was a strong yokozuna candidate. He had overcome his injuries and showed much more consistency. Yokozuna Chiyonofuji and Ōnokuni had both recently retired, and Asahifuji and Hokutoumi were struggling with illness and injury. Konishiki took advantage by winning two championships (his 2nd and 3rd overall) in November 1991 and March 1992, with a record in the last three tournaments of 38 wins and 7 losses. He was denied promotion to yokozuna, normally awarded to those with two consecutive tournament wins or an equivalent achievement. Konishiki had three non-consecutive wins.

The chairman of the Yokozuna Deliberation Committee, Hideo Ueda, announced, "We wanted to make doubly sure that Konishiki is worthy to be a grand champion. Therefore, we decided to wait for another tournament." Another member of the committee, Noboru Kojima, said in an interview in the April issue of Bungei Shunjū that Konishiki did not possess hinkaku (品格), a word derived from hin, meaning "grace, elegance and refinement". His remarks were given the headline, "We Don’t Need a Foreign Yokozuna" in the magazine.

A controversy arose when The Nihon Keizai Shimbun reported that Konishiki in an interview had alleged racial discrimination was the reason for his being denied promotion. The New York Times subsequently quoted Konishiki as saying, "If I were Japanese, I would be yokozuna already." The Japan Sumo Association demanded an apology. Konishiki held a press conference during which he made his apology and tearfully denied making the remarks. He insisted that The Nihon Keizai Shimbun had misinterpreted his remark, and that he had not spoken to The New York Times, and instead a Hawaiian apprentice Koryu had impersonated him on the telephone.

Despite the denial, the damage had been done. The media furore hampered his preparations for the forthcoming tournament which resulted in a mediocre 9–6 record. Konishiki never came close to promotion again.

== Later career ==
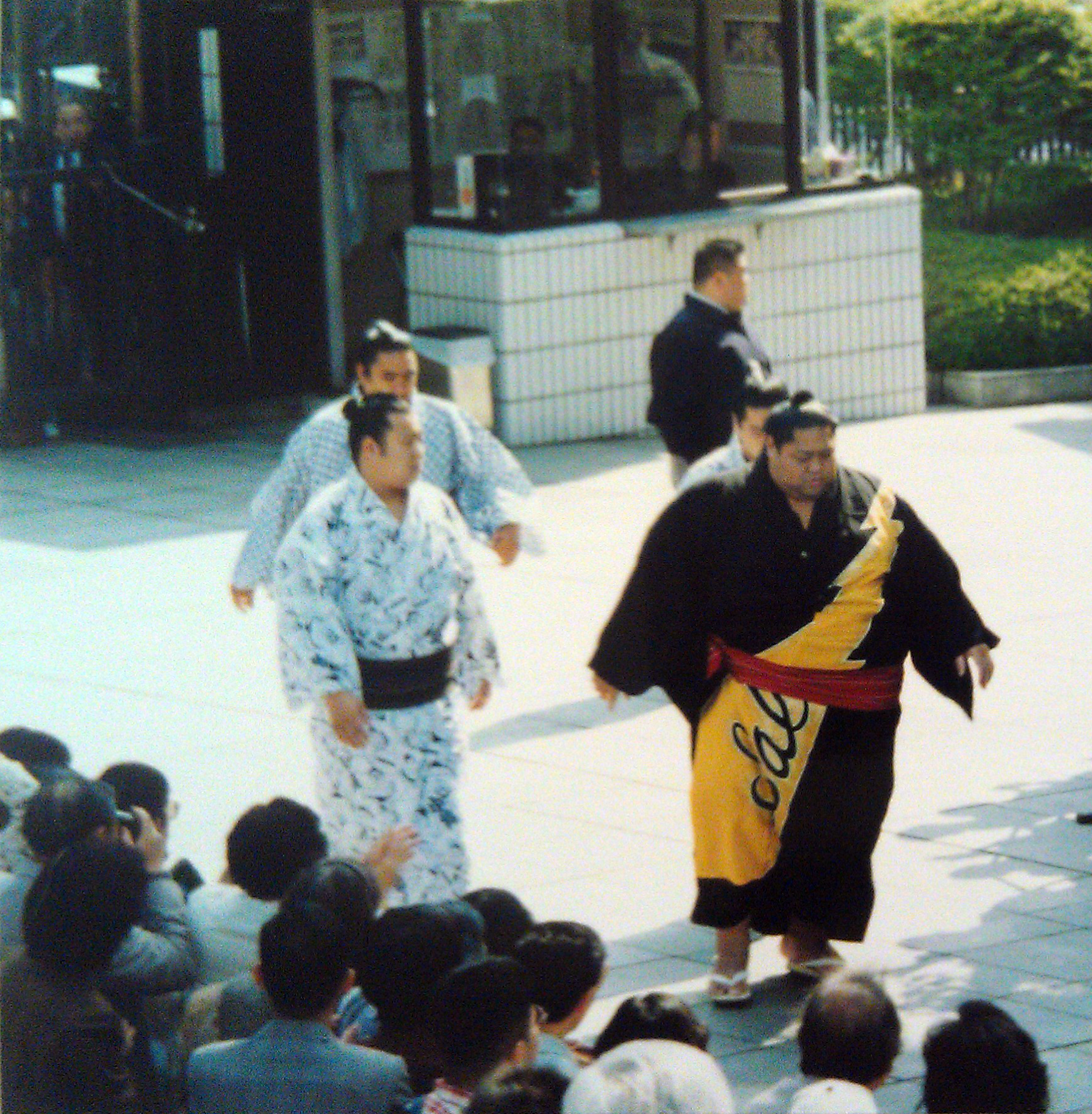
Konishiki and his entourage, May 1996

Konishiki retained his ōzeki ranking for 39 tournaments over more than six years, but he eventually lost it in November 1993 after two consecutive losing records. He continued to compete in the top division as a maegashira for another four years. Now weighing over 600 pounds (270 kg), his knee injury and mobility issues meant he was susceptible to belt throws and slap downs by lighter and more agile opponents. Even though he enjoyed less success, he became progressively more popular with Japanese fans due to his continuous fighting spirit, distinctive bulk and warm, amiable personality.

In November 1997, he faced demotion to the second jūryō division and announced his retirement after 15 years in sumo. In addition to his chronic knee problems, he had been suffering from gout and a stomach ulcer. He said that in spite of his setbacks "I'm glad that I've continued with sumo, because I've learned a lot from sumo, and I've also learned the Japanese language and life style." He had spent 81 consecutive tournaments in the top division, and won 649 bouts there.

== Fighting style ==
Early in his career, under the instruction of his first stablemaster, Konishiki was primarily an oshi-sumo specialist, preferring pushing and thrusting techniques such as oshi-dashi and tsuki-dashi that would win the bout as quickly as possible. Following his knee problems in 1988 and 1989, his balance suffered and as his weight continued to increase he began to change his style, preferring to bide his time by grabbing the opponent's mawashi and rely on his huge weight advantage to wear them out. By 1992 he was winning virtually all his matches by yori-kiri (force out), and his lack of ability to change tack once he had been sidestepped was one of the concerns raised by the Yokozuna Deliberation Committee when he was up for promotion. His peak weight of 285 kilograms (628 lb) recorded in March 1996 was the heaviest ever for a sumo wrestler, until surpassed by Ōrora in 2017. However, since Ōrora only ever made it as high as the makushita division, Konishiki remains the heaviest high-ranking sumo wrestler, or sekitori, in history.

== Life after sumo ==
Konishiki remained in the Japan Sumo Association as an elder for a short time under the name of Sanoyama, before branching out as a Japanese entertainer under the name "KONISHIKI" (the capitalization is an effort to reflect the association's requirement to write his name in the Roman alphabet, after prohibition of spelling it out in Japanese characters after his retirement from sumo).

In 2000 Shinichi Watanabe, director of Excel Saga and Puni Puni Poemy, created an anime series called Dotto! Koni-chan, in which Koni, the protagonist, is a fat child who strongly resembles Konishiki.

In January 2004, he married his girlfriend of two years, former medical worker Chie Iijima. He had previously married former model Sumika Shioda in 1992. They divorced amicably in December 2000.

In 2006, he played in the film Check It Out, Yo Chekeraccho!! and also had a cameo appearance in the film The Fast and the Furious: Tokyo Drift.

He has a recurring role as "Koni-chan" on an NHK children's education program called Nihongo de Asobo (にほんごであそぼ), aimed at conveying traditional and colloquial Japanese language and culture.

Although he continued to DJ for his FM Yokohama show Kony Island, he took a hiatus from Japanese celebrity life for a year in 2007, returning to Hawaii to prepare for gastric bypass surgery. Although he did not have high blood pressure or any heart problems, he had not lost much weight since his retirement, and underwent the operation in February 2008. He announced on his website that the operation went smoothly and that he had since lost 70 kg (150 lb). He returned to Japan in May 2008.

After sumo, he began to turn his talents to music, most notably with his collaboration with Rimi Natsukawa as well as L-Burna on the song "Livin Like Kings". He often sings and raps in a mixture of English and Japanese. He can also play the ukulele. In 2000, he released a hip-hop album called Kms, including songs "Island Girl", "Sumo Stomp", and the old-school classic "Sumo Gangsta".

Following the 2011 earthquake, Konishiki was a high-profile fund-raiser for disaster relief in the stricken regions of Japan.

He started the Konishiki Kids Foundation to help underprivileged children from Hawaii to experience Japanese culture.

In June 2022 he celebrated the 40th anniversary of his arrival in Japan with a party attended by around 300 people, including chairman of the Japan Sumo Association Hakkaku, former yokozuna Wakanohana III, as well as former sekiwake and fellow American-born Takamiyama.

At the end of 2024 Konishiki was hospitalized for about a month with obesity-related glomerulopathy. In December of that year he announced that he suffered kidney failure and received a successful organ transplant from his wife, Chie.

== Career record ==
Konishiki Yasokichi
Year	January Hatsu basho, Tokyo	March Haru basho, Osaka	May Natsu basho, Tokyo	July Nagoya basho, Nagoya	September Aki basho, Tokyo	November Kyūshū basho, Fukuoka
1982	x	x	x	(Maezumo)	East Jonokuchi #32; 7–0; Champion	West Jonidan #56; 7–0; Champion
1983	West Sandanme #50; 6–1	West Sandanme #2; 6–1	West Makushita #28; 6–1	West Makushita #8; 4–3	East Makushita #6; 6–1–P	West Jūryō #12; 11–4–P
1984	East Jūryō #3; 4–5–6	West Jūryō #10; 13–2; Champion	East Jūryō #2; 11–4; Champion	East Maegashira #11; 8–7	West Maegashira #6; 12–3; OF★★	West Sekiwake #1; 5–6–4
1985	West Maegashira #1; 6–9	West Maegashira #3; 8–7	West Komusubi #1; 12–3; F	West Sekiwake #1; 9–6	East Sekiwake #1; Sat out due to injury 0–0–15	West Maegashira #9; 11–4; F
1986	West Komusubi #1; 10–5	East Komusubi #1; 12–3; FT	West Sekiwake #1; 3–6–6	East Maegashira #4; Sat out due to injury 0–0–15	East Maegashira #4; 12–3; O	West Sekiwake #1; 10–5; O
1987	East Sekiwake #1; 10–5; O	East Sekiwake #1; 11–4	East Sekiwake #1; 12–3; F	West Ōzeki #1; 9–6	West Ōzeki #1; 12–3	East Ōzeki #1; 8–7
1988	East Ōzeki #2; 13–2	West Ōzeki #1; 8–7	West Ōzeki #1; 8–7	West Ōzeki #1; 8–7	East Ōzeki #2; 3–12	West Ōzeki #2; 10–5
1989	East Ōzeki #2; 3–9–3	West Ōzeki #2; 10–5	West Ōzeki #2; 9–6	West Ōzeki #2; 8–7	West Ōzeki #2; 5–10	West Ōzeki #2; 14–1
1990	East Ōzeki #1; 10–5	East Ōzeki; 13–2–PPP	East Ōzeki #1; 12–3	West Ōzeki #1; 10–5	East Ōzeki #1; 9–6	West Ōzeki #1; 10–5
1991	West Ōzeki #1; 0–1–14	West Ōzeki #1; 9–6	East Ōzeki #1; 14–1–P	East Ōzeki #1; 12–3	East Ōzeki #1; 11–4	West Ōzeki #1; 13–2
1992	East Ōzeki #1; 12–3	East Ōzeki #1; 13–2	East Ōzeki #1; 9–6	West Ōzeki #1; 10–5	West Ōzeki #1; 9–6	East Ōzeki #1; 0–2–13
1993	West Ōzeki #1; 10–5	West Ōzeki #1; 9–6	West Ōzeki #1; 7–8	West Ōzeki #1; 9–6	East Ōzeki #2; 0–2–13	East Ōzeki #2; 6–9
1994	West Sekiwake #2; 2–13	East Maegashira #9; 8–7	East Maegashira #5; 5–10	East Maegashira #12; 8–7	East Maegashira #10; 8–7	East Maegashira #5; 6–9
1995	West Maegashira #8; 8–7	East Maegashira #3; 5–10	West Maegashira #7; 5–10	West Maegashira #13; 9–6	East Maegashira #5; 5–10	West Maegashira #10; 8–7
1996	East Maegashira #8; 7–8	East Maegashira #9; 6–9	East Maegashira #14; 10–5	West Maegashira #8; 8–7	East Maegashira #4; 4–11	East Maegashira #9; 6–9
1997	East Maegashira #13; 8–7	West Maegashira #10; 6–7–2	East Maegashira #14; 8–7	West Maegashira #9; 8–7	West Maegashira #2; 0–11–4	East Maegashira #14; Retired; 5–9
Record given as wins–losses–absences Top division champion Top division runner-up Retired Lower divisions Non-participation Sanshō key: F=Fighting spirit; O=Outstanding performance; T=Technique Also shown: ★=Kinboshi; P=Playoff(s); Divisions: Makuuchi — Jūryō — Makushita — Sandanme — Jonidan — Jonokuchi Makuuchi ranks: Yokozuna — Ōzeki — Sekiwake — Komusubi — Maegashira

== See also ==
- Glossary of sumo terms
- List of sumo tournament top division champions
- List of sumo tournament top division runners-up
- List of sumo tournament second division champions
- List of heaviest sumo wrestlers
- List of past sumo wrestlers
- List of ōzeki
