= Omi Minami =

Japanese voice actress (born 1968)

- 南 央美
- Born: July 13, 1968 (age 58); Tokyo, Japan
- Education: Chuo University
- Occupations: Voice actress; essayist; columnist
- Years active: 1985–present
- Agent: PomaRancz
- Height: 157 cm (5 ft 2 in)
- Spouse: Yūji Ueda

Omi Minami (南 央美, Minami Omi; born July 13, 1968) is a Japanese voice actress, essayist and columnist. She is mostly known for her work in anime and video game roles, with starring roles as Hyatt in Excel Saga, Ruri Hoshino in Martian Successor Nadesico, Majic in Orphen, as well as Takuro in Di Gi Charat and Fan Xinglou in The Asterisk War. She is best known for voicing the main character Shimajirō Shimano in the Shimajiro TV series and Shimajiro film series.

== Filmography ==
=== Anime ===
- 1988, Akiru Yuuki (Fancy Lala)
- 1992, Miko Mido (La Blue Girl)
- 1993, Shimajirō Shimano (Shima Shima Tora no Shimajirō)
- 1994, Lucim (Mahoujin Guru Guru)
- 1994, Doorknobder (Sailor Moon S)
- 1995, Nanako (Sailor Moon SuperS)
- 1996, Mr. C. Ringe (Jewel BEM Hunter Lime)
- 1996, Naozumi Kamura (Kodomo no Omocha)
- 1996, Ruri Hoshino (Martian Successor Nadesico)
- 1996, Legendary Sorcerer (Those Who Hunt Elves)
- 1997, Akira (CLAMP School Detectives)
- 1998, Spencer Weinberg Takahama (Fair, then Partly Piggy)
- 1998, Majic Lin (Sorcerous Stabber Orphen)
- 1998, Akane, Nikorinbou (Ojarumaru)
- 1999, Hyatt (Excel Saga)
- 1999, Minagawa Takurou (Di Gi Charat)
- 1999, Eros (I'm Gonna Be An Angel!)
- 1999, Pat Campbell (Infinite Ryvius)
- 1999, Kyou (Legend of Himiko)
- 1999, Majic Lin (Sorcerous Stabber Orphen: Revenge)
- 2000, Nari (Dotto! Koni-chan)
- 2000, Cyberdoll Kei (Hand Maid May)
- 2001, Shii Aasu (Puni Puni Poemy)
- 2001, Miho Umeda (I My Me! Strawberry Eggs!)
- 2001, Megumi Hanajima (Fruits Basket)
- 2002, Saloma (RockMan.EXE) (MegaMan NT Warrior)
- 2002, Kozue Kusanagi (Please Teacher!)
- 2002, Tadahiro Amatsu (Child) (Shrine of the Morning Mist)
- 2002, Rika Tokino (UFO Ultramaiden Valkyrie)
- 2002, Dvergr (Kiddy Grade)
- 2003, Kiyoshi Omocha (Di Gi Charat Nyo!)
- 2003, Hel (Mythical Detective Loki Ragnarok)
- 2003, Eirote Borchard (Scrapped Princess)
- 2004, Ein (Phantom - The Animation)
- 2004, Mika Suzuki (Sensei no Ojikan)
- 2004, Dino Sparks (Legendz)
- 2004, Reiko and Muu-chan (Tactics)
- 2004, Yukihito (Kannazuki no Miko)
- 2005, Johanna (GUN×SWORD)
- 2005, Nina (Hell Girl)
- 2006, Kotarou Mochizuki and Alice Eve (Black Blood Brothers)
- 2006, Hänsel (Black Lagoon)
- 2006, Mori Madoka (Ghost Hunt)
- 2006, Euphemia li Britannia (Code Geass - Lelouch of the Rebellion)
- 2007, Tama (Gintama)
- 2009, Miki (Gokujou!! Mecha Mote Iinchou)
- 2011, Tama and Warti (Gintama')
- 2011, Suzu (Suite PreCure♪ The Movie: Take it Back! The Miraculous Melody that Connects Hearts)
- 2012, Eucliwood Hellscythe (Fantasy) (Is This a Zombie?)
- 2012, Ichirō Nakata (Zetman)
- 2013, Kokuryuu, Dassai, Reisen, and Hou'oubiden (Tokyo Ravens)
- 2013, Shimajirō Shimano (Shimajirō to Fufu no Daibōken: Sukue! Nanairo no Hana)
- 2014, Shimajirō Shimano (Shimajirō to Kujira no Uta)
- 2015, Fan Xinglou (The Asterisk War)
- 2015, Shimajirō Shimano (Shimajirō to Ōkina Ki)
- 2016, Girl in Arcanretia (KonoSuba)
- 2016, Shimajirō Shimano (Shimajirō to Ehon no Kuni ni)
- 2017, Shimajirō Shimano, Coco (Shimajirō to Niji no Oashisu)
- 2018, Shimajirō Shimano (Shimajiro Mahō no Shima no Daibōken)
- 2019, Shimajirō Shimano (Shimajiro to Ururu no Heroland)
- 2021, Shimajirō Shimano (Shimajiro to Sora Tobufune)
- 2022, Shimajirō Shimano (Shimajirō to Kirakira Ōkoku no Ōji-sama)

=== Film ===
- 1998, Ruri Hoshino (Martian Successor Nadesico: The Motion Picture – Prince of Darkness)
- 2006, Minka (Origin: Spirits of the Past)
- 2013, Tama (Gintama: The Movie: The Final Chapter: Be Forever Yorozuya)
- 2021, Tama & Tamako (Gintama: The Very Final)

=== Video games ===
- 1997, Clod (Silhouette Mirage)
- 1998, Judika Jeder (Atelier Elie: The Alchemist of Salburg 2)
- 1999, Kakurine (Evil Zone) (aka Eretzvaiu)
- 1999, Meg Launcher (Evolution 2 (Japanese))
- 2000, Majic Lin (Orphen: Scion of Sorcery)
- 2000, Ein/Elen Azuma (Phantom of Inferno)
- 2000, Meredy (Tales of Eternia)
- 2001, Konoha Ichinose (21: Two One)
- 2001, Pipotchi (Ape Escape 2)
- 2001, Emirio Stanbelk (Shikigami no Shiro)
- 2001, Monika Allenford (Growlanser III: The Dual Darkness)
- 2002, Tamami Konno (Tokimeki Memorial Girl's Side)
- 2002, Pipotchi (Ape Escape 2)
- 2004, Satsuki Yumizuka (Melty Blood Re-ACT)
- 2004, Ako (Onimusha 3: Demon Siege)
- 2004, Prier (Stella Deus: The Gate of Eternity)
- 2005, Makoto Adachi/Mira (Medical 91)
- 2005, Xiaomu (Namco × Capcom)
- 2005, Sakuya Takani (Snow Story Renewal)
- 2005, Rico Risu (Duel Savior Destiny)
- 2006, Emilio Stanburke (Castle of Shikigami III)
- 2007, Ruri Hoshino (Another Century's Episode 3: The Final)
- 2007, Trent (Everybody's Golf 5)
- 2007, Meril (Odin Sphere)
- 2007, Xiaomu (Super Robot Taisen OG Saga: Endless Frontier)
- 2007, Satsuki Yumizuka (Melty Blood Act Cadenza)
- 2008, Euphemia Ii Britannia (Code Geass: Lelouch of the Rebellion Lost Colors)
- 2008, Satsuki Yumizuka (Melty Blood Actress Again)
- 2008, Ruri Hoshino (Super Robot Wars A Portable)
- 2009, Kongiku (Muramasa: The Demon Blade)
- 2010, Xiaomu (Super Robot Taisen OG Saga: Endless Frontier EXCEED)
- 2012, Xiaomu (Project X Zone)
- 2014, Meredy (Tales of Eternia)
- 2015, Xiaomu (Project X Zone 2)
- 2017, Meredy (Tales of the Rays)
- 2017, Ruri Hoshino (Super Robot Wars V)
- 2017, Euphemia Ii Britannia (SINoALICE)
- 2018, Tama (Gintama Rumble)
- 2019, Ruri Hoshino (Super Robot Wars T)
- 2020, Meredy (Tales of Crestoria)

=== Dubbing roles ===
- Alex (Totally Spies)
- Ratchet and Additional Voices (Widget)
