= Tsundere =

Term for a character development process

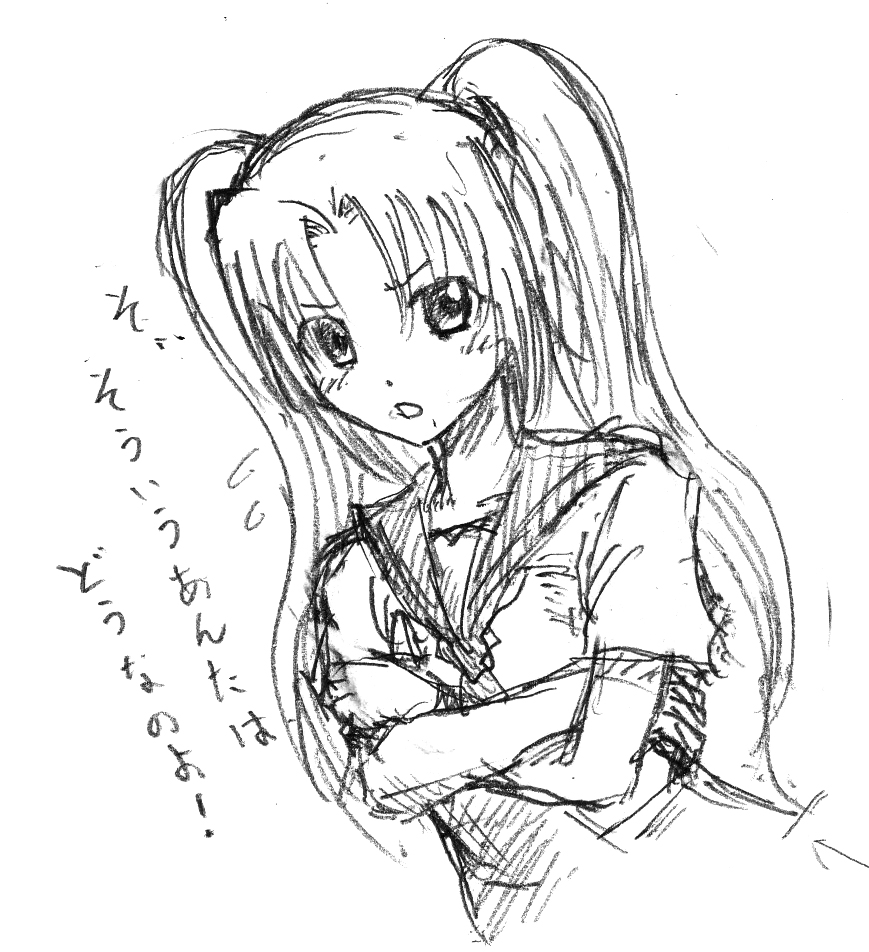
A typical example of a tsundere character

Tsundere (ツンデレ; pronounced [t͡sɯndeɾe]) is a Japanese term for a character development process that depicts a character with an initially harsh personality—"hard on the outside", guarded, and reserved with strangers—who gradually reveals a warmer, friendlier side over time.

The word is derived from the ideophones tsun tsun (ツンツン) ('morosely, aloofly, standoffish') and dere dere (でれでれ) ('in a lovey-dovey or infatuated manner, fawningly'). Originally found in Japanese bishōjo games, the word is now part of the otaku moe phenomenon, reaching into other media. The term was made popular in the visual novel Rumbling Hearts (Kimi ga Nozomu Eien).

== Terminology ==
Manga author Ken Akamatsu lists tsundere as one of the special cases in his definition of moe:

"The person feeling it must be stronger: the object of moe is weak and dependent (like a child) on the person, or is in a situation where she cannot oppose (like a maid)... (*Tsundere only: There will be times where the stronger and weaker role is reversed)."

The concept has received increasing attention in Japan, with a maid café named Nagomi in Akihabara started having tsundere events in 2006 (Note: "In Tokyo's Akihabara district there is reportedly a tsundere café, and the word tsunderera, better rendered in English as Tsunderella due to being highly evocative of Cinderella, was nominated for a prize in the 2006 fashionable word awards, indicating that 'tsundere' culture may become more prominent in the future." February 2, 2007, "Toymaker introduces portable TV with harsh audio guidance that gradually gets kinder" in the Mainichi Times.) and tsundere-themed products released (like Tomy Co.'s portable television set), (Note: "Toy manufacturer Tomy Co. has come up with the world's first tsundere portable television set, which gives audio guidance with a harsh voice that gradually becomes kinder as the user gets used to the set... Tsundere is a word for a type of feminine personality that is initially uptight and cold, and then kind and loving. It is well known among Japan's otaku community, and ranks in popularity with the word moe, which signifies an enthusiasm or fetish for something, especially in connection with anime." February 2, 2007, Mainichi) and the concept increasingly reflected in recent anime, from an extended discussion of the meaning of the concept and its origin on the Internet in Lucky Star's Lucky Channel segment classifying the characters according to tsundere-ness. Tsundere characters are typically introduced as being critical toward, and looking down upon, the main character. Often, as the story progresses, tsundere characters eventually warm up to the main character, sometimes to the point of falling in love. They usually find it very hard to admit these feelings; some outright deny them.

Comiket organizer Koichi Ichikawa has described Lum from Urusei Yatsura as being both the source of moe and the first tsundere; figurine sculptor Bome has also cited Lum as an inspiration for his designs. Manga critic Jason Thompson named Madoka Ayukawa of the 1980s series Kimagure Orange Road as the root of the tsundere archetype. Other anime and manga featuring tsundere include Love Hina, Neon Genesis Evangelion, and Bakemonogatari, among many others. In Excel Saga volume 15, author Rikdo Koshi defines tsundere as "hard on the outside, soft on the inside" and associates it with character Misaki Matsuya. Some voice actors (VAs) have garnered a reputation for voicing tsundere characters such as Rie Kugimiya (who voices Louise in The Familiar of Zero, Taiga Aisaka in Toradora!, and Nagi in Hayate the Combat Butler) and Ayana Taketatsu (who voices Kirino Kosaka in Oreimo).

Tsundere as a concept is not strictly limited to women, and is not strictly limited to manga or anime. The character Germany from the series Hetalia: Axis Powers is portrayed as being tsundere, and is paired with a "lovable loser", Italy Veneziano. Tsundere roleplay has become a common theme in maid cafés.

== See also ==
- Ambivalence
- Glossary of anime and manga
- Hawksian woman
- Love–hate relationship
- Queen bee (sociology)
- Shrew (stock character)
