= Richard Kilgarriff =

Richard Kilgarriff is the founder and host of Books for Breakfast, Soho House's longest running members' event in the UK and Bookomi literary events. He is also the producer/presenter of the Bookomi podcast, a short-film producer, presenter, writer, television executive and hotel reviewer for Mr and Mrs Smith. Born in Leeds, Yorkshire, he attended Leeds Grammar School and St Edmund Hall, Oxford University.

== Career ==
As a radio producer, Richard co-created and presented two series of The Ad Break with Fi Glover for BBC Radio 5 Live and won a Sony Gold Award as producer of the Virgin Radio Breakfast show for best on-air promotion.

In the mid-nineties he produced a programme of short films for exhibition in a converted garden shed with a creative team made up of Richard Bracewell, Dave Grindley, Ed Smith, Charlie Fairall, Al Murray, David Wolstencroft, Kavi Pujara and Pleasance Theatre owner Christopher Richardson.

The following year he converted a family caravan into a mobile version of The Smallest Cinema in the World with designers Harvey Bertram Brown, Carolyn Corben, and Paul Bowring, driving it (and a crew of ten people) to The Cannes Film Festival, where he was featured on Barry Norman’s Film 96 as a “remarkable example of British Ingenuity.”

Returning to the UK, he developed over two hundred hours of programming for new digital youth channel Rapture TV, many of which were sold to BBC, ITV and Channel 4. After helping to re-launch Rapture as a clubbing brand in 1998, his last commission for the channel was Carl Cox, Race Against Time, documenting the DJ's attempt to hold two consecutive Millennium Eve concerts in Sydney and Hawaii.

In 2002 he joined Turner Broadcasting, owned byTime Warner, heading up the entertainment channels in the UK & Germany in 2004, helping to make Cartoon Network and Boomerang the highest rating family of children's channels in the UK under his leadership. Whilst at Turner he was executive producer and co-creator of a national toy lottery for kids Truckatoon, an animated girl-band The V-Birds and a cartoon promoting healthy eating for kids Elfy Food. He was also executive producer and judge on Story Quest, a writing competition for children inspired by illustrator Quentin Blake.

In 2011 he launched Books for Breakfast, a series of literary events at private members' club Soho House and in 2012 he launched the author broker service Bookomi.
