= Puni Puni Poemy =

2001 anime

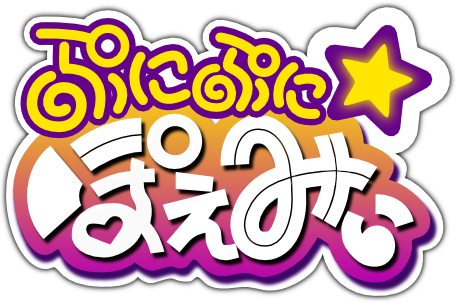

ぷにぷに☆ぽえみぃ (Puni Puni ☆ Poemii)
- Genre: Magical girl, parody, surreal comedy
- Original video animation
- Directed by: Shinichi Watanabe
- Produced by: Shigeru Kitayama; Yuji Matsukura
- Written by: Yōsuke Kuroda
- Music by: Toshio Masuda
- Studio: J.C.Staff
- Licensed by: AUS: Madman Entertainment; NA: ADV Films; UK: ADV Films
- Released: 7 March 2001 – 19 December 2001
- Runtime: 30 minutes
- Episodes: 2

Puni Puni Poemy (ぷにぷに☆ぽえみぃ, Puni Puni ☆ Poemii) is a Japanese two-part original video animation spin-off from the Excel Saga manga and anime television series. It features some of that series' secondary characters and many of its staff, primarily director Shinichi Watanabe. Like Excel Saga, it is a parody of other anime, manga and various aspects of popular culture, though in this case with the magical girl genre providing its primary focus and general structure. The series was originally an in-joke from an episode of Excel Saga; Watanabe decided to take the in-joke to its most extreme logical conclusion, creating the series.

== Episodes ==
Puni Puni Poemy was advertised in North America as a successor to Excel Saga.

Puni Puni Poemy comprises two episodes, both around 26 minutes in length.

- Part 1 – Poemy is in a Bad Mood

The introductory sequence shows Poemy fighting shadowy figures of various other magical girls such as Usagi Tsukino from Sailor Moon, Tickle from Majokko Tickle, Utena from Revolutionary Girl Utena, Megu and Non from Majokko Megu-chan, Sakura Kinomoto from Cardcaptor Sakura, Sally, from Sally, the Witch (considered to be the first magical girl in Japanese animation) and for some reason Mahoro from Mahoromatic despite her not being a magical girl.

At the start of a new school year the over-energetic Poemy Watanabe is introduced, along with her adoptive parents Nabeshin and Kumi-Kumi. Poemy rushes to the school to be the first there, at the same time she repeatedly proclaims her desire to become a successful voice actress. At the school, Poemy's best girl friend, Futaba Aasu, is presented as Poemy's biggest supporter and in fact perennially sexually attracted to her. Back from school, Poemy and Futaba realize the horror of finding Poemy's parents and their robot dog crucified by Alien #1, an extraterrestrial assassin with peculiar genitalia. Her home destroyed, Poemy moves in with Futaba and her six sisters.

Later, a massive alien robot attacks the city, whereupon it turns out that Futaba and her sisters are actually a secret team of super-powered heroines dedicated to defending the Earth, also known as Sol III. Unfortunately, the Aasu sisters' magic is strictly defensive, so they are unable to defeat the rampaging robot. Meanwhile, Poemy obtains a talking, magic fish that when used as a magic wand transforms her into Puni Puni Poemy, a powerful magical girl. After the typical transformation, however, she promptly throws away her wand, forgoes the use of magic, and attacks the robot with her bare hands.

- Part 2 – With a Dream Greater Than Earth

Continuing from the previous scene, the wastefully energetic Poemy uses her new powers to tear through the alien mecha, destroying it. Next, Poemy decides to use her new strength to continue pursuing her career as a voice actress, and right wrongs as she sees them throughout society. However, Poemy appears to do more bad than good, as she harshly punishes citizens for small incidents, and accidentally sends a nuclear missile off-course, completely destroying an entire country. Then, the Aasu sisters finally decide to confront Puni Puni Poemy, and realize she is actually the Poemy Watanabe they have been hosting in their own house.

Afterwards, it is revealed that K, the school boy whom Poemy is attracted to, is actually an octopus-like alien, and he will be commanding the following invasion to Earth. Next morning, the invasion proceeds, with a massive Death Star en route to Earth, and with K capturing the Aasu sisters, and subjecting them to hentai-related bondage, as he learned from Japanese animation. In the end, the two alien henchmen are inexplicably revealed to be Poemy's foster parents, Nabeshin and Kumi-Kumi, who are thus not dead, and Poemy and Futaba combine their powers in order to make the world nice and end the extraterrestrial menace.

== Characters ==
- Poemi "Kobayashi" Watanabe (ワタナベぽえみ, Watanabe Poemi)

Voiced by: Yumiko Kobayashi (Japanese); Cynthia Martinez (English)

The star of the show, Poemi Watanabe is 10 years old and hyperactive beyond comparison. Described as "wastefully energetic", she's an eager student, she's got a crush on K, the popular boy in her class, and she wants to become a voice actress. She normally breaks the fourth wall by referring to herself as "Kobayashi", which is the last name of her own voice actress, Yumiko Kobayashi. Poemy also breaks the fourth wall by referring to Nabeshin as "the Director", since Nabeshin is voiced by Shinichi Watanabe himself, the director of the series.

After her adoptive parents, Nabeshin and Kumi-Kumi, are killed by Alien #1, Poemy moves in with her best friend, Futaba Aasu. Then, when an alien mecha attacks the city, Poemy encounters a mysterious and silent man playing the shamisen, who is apparently her real father, and he gives her a fish, which when gutted and used as a magic wand, allows her to transform into Puni Puni Poemy, a magical girl embodying the will of Earth itself.

- Shinichi "Nabeshin" Watanabe (ワタナベシンイチ Watanabe Shin'ichi, ナベシン Nabeshin)

Voiced by: Shinichi Watanabe (Japanese); Brett Weaver (English)

Nabeshin is the animated alter-ego of real-life director Shinichi Watanabe, who previously appeared in Puni Puni Poemy's forerunner, Excel Saga. At the conclusion of that series, he married Kumi-Kumi, and at the beginning of this show, they have adopted ten-year-old Poemy. As in Excel Saga, Nabeshin seems to be constantly hunted down by different enemies, and being the director of these shows, he displays super-human abilities that involve his afro. In this occasion, Nabeshin and his wife are successfully killed by crucifixion, along with their robotic pet dog, by Alien #1. However, near the end of the second part they are inexplicably alive and appear to be the alien henchmen themselves.

- Kumi-Kumi (クミクミさん Kumikumi-san)

Voiced by: Satomi Korogi (Japanese, uncredited); Tiffany Grant (English)

Introduced in Excel Saga, Kumi-Kumi was a simple mountain girl who rescued Nabeshin from an avalanche and attempted to feed him soup. But Nabeshin isn't too good with hot foods, so he refused, only to have her pursue him across the rest of the series. He finally relented, marrying her at the end of the final episode. At the start of Puni Puni Poemy, she and Nabeshin now have Poemy as their adopted daughter. Despite being killed by the alien invader along with Nabeshin, Kumi-Kumi apparently saved her husband using acupuncture, and they are both alright at the end of the second part.

- K (Kくん K-kun)

Voiced by: Ryu Itou (Japanese); Mark Laskowski (English)

K is one of Poemy's classmates, but unfortunately for Poemy, her wild crush on him isn't reciprocated. In the second episode, K discovers that he is an octopus-like alien who had been raised in human form for ten years, and he takes charge of the invasion of the planet, which is focused on ravishing Japanese women, since hentai transmissions have given the aliens the idea that that's what women are really like. K, whose real name is Space Alien Prince, is composed entirely of tentacles as he and his family parody the Mars People from the game series Metal Slug.

- Mage Queen (魔道士の女王 Madō-shi no joō)

Voiced by: Yumiko Nakanishi (Japanese); Tiffany Grant (English)

A mysterious figure, the precise nature of the Mage Queen is not explained. Initially, her somewhat threatening monologue aboard a space station that oversees Earth seems to count her an enemy. However, she greets the eventual arrival of Puni Puni Poemy with joy and considers the invading aliens a threat. Her reign as queen of the magic is cut short when she is assassinated by Alien #2. Her design is based on the female characters of Leiji Matsumoto.

- Alien Henchmen

Voiced by: Daisuke Kishio (Japanese); Andy McAvin (English) – Alien 1

Voiced by: Takeharu Onishi (Japanese); Rob Mungle (English) – Alien 2

These extraterrestrial assassins dress like pimps from the waist up and speak in an undecipherable hipster jargon. Their genitalia look like Bungee Balls that hang down to their knees, and can be used as sort of like whips. Alien #1 has one such testicle, and Alien #2 has two, and no reason for this anatomical difference is given. Early in the first episode, Alien #1 kills Nabeshin and Kumi-Kumi, and then controls the giant robot that attacks the city. Then, during most of the second episode, he spends his time at the Aasu household completely unnoticed, even joining the girls in the bathtub, until he captures them. Alien #2's main role is in arriving with a giant battleship and attacking the Mage Queen. Ultimately, both alien henchmen are not whom they appear to be, as in a paradox they take off their disguises and reveal to be Nabeshin and Kumi-Kumi, who are alive and well.

=== The Aasu Sisters ===
Poemy's classmate, Futaba, is but one of the seven Aasu sisters, protectors of Earth. Aasu is the Japanese transliteration of the English word "Earth", and each of the girl's names is derived from a number: seven, six, five, and so on. All of the girls have magical powers, but given that these powers are purely defensive in nature, the family is useless as an offensive unit. Additionally to their family name referring to the Earth, aasu is also the Japanese transliteration of the English words "arse" or "ass", which is comically exploited in the English dub, such as the character Futaba saying "save my Aasus" when the sisters are captured.

- Nanase Aasu (ああすななせ Āsu Nanase)

Voiced by: Aya Hisakawa (Japanese); Kelly Manison (English)

At 28 years old, Nanase is the eldest sister, who works as a data processor in an office. Her power is the Earth Dance of Flowers, the ability to summon a whirlwind of flowers, to absolutely no effect. Her name is derived from nana, the Japanese word for "seven".

- Mutsumi Aasu (ああすむつみ Āsu Mutsumi)

Voiced by: Tomoko Kawakami (Japanese); Yu Haul (English)

Mutsumi is 22 years old, and much to her own surprise speaks with a Kansai accent (in the English language dub a Brooklyn accent is used). She has something of a complex about the small size of her breasts. Her power is the Earth Breakfall, which means she can fall over safely. Her name is derived from mutsu, the Japanese word for "six". Her short, purple hair, and her white outfit, make her physically similar to the first Ropponmatsu from Excel Saga.

- Itsue Aasu (ああすいつえ Āsu Itsue)

Voiced by: Kotono Mitsuishi (Japanese); Larissa Wolcott (English)

The 19-year-old Itsue is working her way through high school as a dominatrix, and is prone to using her whip to physically abuse her sisters when she gets angry. Her power, the Earth Barrier Shield, enables her to generate a protective energy field, which she activates while spinning her whip. Her name comes from itsu, the Japanese word for "five".

- Shii Aasu (ああすしい Āsu Shī)

Voiced by: Omi Minami (Japanese); Monica Rial (English)

Shii is 18 years old, and her most distinctive feature are her excessively large breasts. She constantly grabs them and announces how heavy they are, but in one occasion she mentioned she would use Poemy's magic to make them much smaller. Her special power is Earth Healing, which does no damage. Her name comes from shi, the Japanese word for "four". Shii has blue hair and resembles Hyatt from Excel Saga, and in fact, both characters have the same voice actresses, Omi Minami and Monica Rial.

- Mitsuki Aasu (ああすみつき Āsu Mitsuki)

Voiced by: Atsuko Enomoto (Japanese); Jessica Boone (English)

Cute and energetic, Mitsuki is 15 years old, and seems to play an active role in the running of the Aasu household. Initially, she opposes the idea of letting Poemy stay with them, and later she distrusts Puni Puni Poemy's actions. Her power is Earth Acceleration, enabling her to run at vast speeds. Her name is derived from mittsu, the Japanese word for "three". With her long ponytail Mitsuki is physically similar to Misaki Matsuya from Excel Saga.

- Futaba Aasu (ああすふたば Āsu Futaba)

Voiced by: Yuka Imai (Japanese); Luci Christian (English)

10-year-old Futaba is Poemy's classmate and best friend, and she is madly in love with her, a fact to which Poemy is oblivious. Futaba's power allows her to pacify hostile creatures, making them happy and harmless. In the final confrontation with the invading aliens, Futaba combines her power with Poemy's, and since Poemy is a representation of Earth, this act pacifies the planet's population, resulting in peace with the aliens. After this event, director Nabeshin casually mentions that Futaba is in reality the main character of the show. Her name comes from futa, the Japanese word for "two". Futaba is mostly a parody of Tomoyo Daidouji, the best friend of magical girl Sakura Kinomoto from Cardcaptor Sakura. Unlike Tomoyo, however, Futaba displays more extreme fantasies and lesbian arousal whenever she is with her friend.

- Hitomi Aasu (ああすひとみ Āsu Hitomi)

Voiced by: Satomi Korogi (Japanese); Kira Vincent-Davis (English)

The youngest of the Aasu sisters, at only 3 years old, Hitomi is in a hurry to grow up and grow breasts. She possesses the power of precognition, although it is not very good because she mostly foresees the obvious. Whenever she is having a vision, she seems to have bowel movements. Her name comes from hito, the Japanese word for "one".

== Reception ==
Lynzee Loveridge called the series an "over-the-top magical girl premise" which lampoons the magical girl genre, with "bondage, crucified robot dogs, and weird alien dicks".

=== Banning in New Zealand ===
Due to its sexual and violent scenes, the Classification Office banned Puni Puni Poemy in New Zealand. A New Zealand anime fan, Simon Brady, unsuccessfully appealed to the Film and Literature Board of Review to change the classification, citing that the show was only rated MA15+ in Australia. However, the Board of Review stated that a program would be banned if they felt that it promoted the exploitation of children or young persons for sexual purposes, extreme violence and extreme cruelty.

On 8 June 2021, the Classification Office re-classified Puni Puni Poemy R16 after granting a request from a member of the public to reconsider the classification of the series.
