= Elfy Food =

2005 British television series

- Genre: Action, Adventure & Comedy
- Developed by: Turner Broadcasting
- Country of origin: England
- Original language: English
- No. of seasons: 1
- No. of episodes: 7

Original release
- Release: October 2005 – December 2005

Elfy Food is a British animated mini-series that was produced by Turner Broadcasting for Cartoon Network UK in response to the Choosing Health White Paper published in November 2004. The six 2-minute cartoons featured 5 healthy-eating elves that were on a mission to retrieve magical foods. Its purpose was to promote "the virtues of fresh fruit and vegetables to a pre-teen audience".

== Overview ==
"Initially, it was a defensive measure, then it became clear we could contribute something in the long term if we invested enough time and money and had a decent story."

— Richard Kilgarriff, the general manager of Turner Entertainment Networks

The mini-series, which was created to deflect criticism for screening junk food advertisements and combating childhood obesity, took 18 months to develop at a cost of £250,000. The show was also supported by children's charities including Barnardo's, ChildLine and Mencap, and produced in consultation with Great Ormond Street children's hospital. The series was offered to terrestrial broadcasters including the BBC and Channel 4 for free. During production, Ofcom and the Food Standards Agency were consulted in the hopes that the Department of Health and other government departments would use the cartoon characters in their own healthy eating campaigns. Turner Broadcasting has also that its strategy is to persuade the watchdog, Ofcom, that broadcasters should be allowed to continue advertising what it insists are "legal" sugary and fatty foods if they also promote healthy eating.

"We want it to last a long time, because our audience is renewed every year, so we made a lot of the story elements very traditional - setting up obstacles that characters overcome and the forces of good and evil battling together."

— Richard Kilgarriff, the general manager of Turner Entertainment Networks

For a week in October 2005, Turner Broadcasting broadcast an episode every hour during peak time on Europe in October on three channels: the Cartoon Network, Boomerang and Toonami. The series was also shown in Europe and the US. The animation will also be shown in Europe and the US. Each episode featured a different fruit or vegetable, each of which imbued the elves with different superpowers. The show's motto was "Once we've eaten, we can't be beaten."

== Plot ==
Set in Elf Land, where a community of elves enjoy extraordinarily long and active lives, thanks to super-powers derived from their diet of "Elfy Food". But the ambitious evil dictator called Frank Farter, burns all the crops in a bid to make the elves too weak to fight his takeover plot, but not all hope is lost as the Head of The Elves calls a group of five young elves, Amy, Bippin, Yuri, Sylva and Ezra to go and set out on a quest to find the secret and well-guarded stores of elfy food hidden in the land's most uncharted corners. But with ogres, baddies and evil Frank Farter and his minions hot on their trail, these elflings must find the crops before Frank Farter does.

The name of the real fruits and vegetables in the show change into a name that involves its size, shape, color, and taste.

- Apples - Crunch-a-Balls: provides "sportability"
- Brussels sprouts - Greenodomes: provides "gas power"
- Carrots - Lumo Gooms: provides "night-vision"
- Oranges - C Squirters: cures "illness"
- Broccoli - Turbo Tips: provides "turbo power"
- Peas - Moonbeans: provides "dodgeability"
- Pears - Popdrops: provides "super speed"

== Characters ==
- Amy: The polite, passionate one of the elves. Her favorite color is pink. She loves everything girly and she is sweet. She loves beauty treatments but hates bad hair days. Secretly, she has a crush on Yuri. Her special power is her speed.
- Bippin: The aggressive, hasty one of the elves. He has a crush on Sylva but never admits it. He tries to impress her but is slightly jealous of Yuri, who he thinks (Sylva) has a soft spot for. His favorite color is blue. He loves fighting and finding the opportunity to use his super power whenever he can. He is good friends with Ezra and is the one who manages to get him out of sticky situations. His super power is his strength. He hates pretty stuff.
- Yuri: The calm, quiet one of the elves. A Japanese elf who is mostly peaceful. Speaks with a soft voice. His favorite color is all of the colors but loves orange the most because it reminds him of the C-Squirters. He loves peace and is agile but is faithful to the kung fu mantra, only to use it in extreme situations. He does Yoga sometimes but mostly likes meditation. His special power is his agility.
- Sylva: The feisty, strong-willed one of the elves. She's the leader of the group who loves being boss but hates being wrong. Bippin, her secret admirer has a crush on her but is not afraid to put him in his place. Her favorite color is light blue. Her and Yuri are best friends. Her special power is her brains.
- Ezra: The timid one of the elves. mostly is called Ez by Bippin. he often gets very scared and has the ability to attract trouble. He does not have much confidence. His special power is never revealed because Grand Elf is only one who knows but doesn't tell.
- Grand Elf: The head of the elf council in Elfland. Always appears in the opening sequences which tells the story. He loves taking long naps but hates being disturbed. He is the oldest elf in Elfland. He tells the elves the story and gives them the map to find the secret Elfy Food locations.
- Frank Farter: The antagonist of the series. The ambitious evil dictator who destroyed all of the Elfy Food with an evil plot to take over Elfland by making the elves too weak but is off to get the crops and stop the "elfy gang" in the secret locations. He's always beaten by the elves but doesn't give up. He is named after a type of food called frankfurter.
