= Pandora in the Crimson Shell: Ghost Urn =

Japanese manga series and its adaptations

- Cover of the first volume

紅殻のパンドラ (Kōkaku no Pandora)
- Genre: Comedy; Yuri
- Manga
- Written by: Masamune Shirow, Kōshi Rikudō
- Illustrated by: Kōshi Rikudō, Rin Hitotose
- Published by: Kadokawa Shoten
- English publisher: NA: Seven Seas Entertainment
- Magazine: Newtype Ace (October 2012 – July 2013); Niconico Ace (September 2013 – September 2024)
- Original run: 10 October 2012 – 20 September 2024
- Volumes: 26
- Anime film
- Directed by: Munenori Nawa
- Written by: Tatsuya Takahashi
- Music by: Technoboys Pulcraft Green-Fund
- Studio: Studio Gokumi; AXsiZ
- Released: 5 December 2015
- Runtime: 47 minutes
- Anime television series
- Directed by: Munenori Nawa
- Written by: Tatsuya Takahashi
- Music by: Technoboys Pulcraft Green-Fund
- Studio: Studio Gokumi; AXsiZ
- Licensed by: AUS: Madman; NA: Funimation
- Original network: AT-X, Tokyo MX, KBS, BS11, TV Saitama, Chiba TV, tvk, Sun TV, GTV, MTV, TVQ
- Original run: 8 January 2016 – 25 March 2016
- Episodes: 12
- icon

Pandora in the Crimson Shell: Ghost Urn (Japanese: 紅殻のパンドラ, Hepburn: Kōkaku no Pandora) is a Japanese manga series based on a concept by Masamune Shirow, with designs and editorial contributions by Shirow in every collected tankōbon volume, and written and illustrated by Kōshi Rikudō and Rin Hitotose. The manga began serialization in Kadokawa Shoten's Newtype Ace magazine in October 2012, later moving to the Niconico Ace web publication, and ended in September 2024. It is licensed in English by Seven Seas Entertainment. An anime adaptation has been produced by Studio Gokumi and AXsiZ. It was first released as a film in theaters in December 2015. It aired as a television series between 8 January and 25 March 2016.

The series was conceived as an effort to officially merge the already connected universes of Appleseed and Ghost in the Shell, with the long-stalled Glitch Witch envisioned as the second half of that story.

== Plot ==
Nene Nanakorobi, a full conversion cyborg, dreams of attaining world peace. She is traveling on a cruise ship towards Cenacle, a scenic artificial island when she meets Uzal Delilah, an eccentric scientist. The two become fast friends along with Uzal's cyborg pet Clarion, a cat-like combat android, who Nene immediately takes a liking to.

After they part ways, a terrorist attack of unknown origin threatens to shatter Nene and Clarion's friendship. In a desperate attempt to save her new friend, Uzal gives Nene the ability to use a device known as the Pandora Device, which is found inside Clarion's body. This allows Nene to master skills and abilities unlike anything seen before in the advancing world.

Nene and Clarion work together on various missions, including rescuing children from shopping mall fires and confronting dangerous criminals, with the aim of maintaining world peace. Their efforts are complicated by B.U.E.R., a sapient robot resembling a five-legged lion, whose behavior and powers create difficulties for them. Nene's guardian, the scientist Takumi Korobase, also takes a strong interest in B.U.E.R.

Torn between saving the world and keeping B.U.E.R. out of the wrong hands, Nene and Clarion's goal of achieving world peace seems impossible. With this task, it is up to them to complete their goal, or get their friendship destroyed in the process.

== Characters ==
Nene Nanakorobi (七転 福音, Nanakorobi Nene)
Voiced by: Sanae Fuku (Japanese); Megan Shipman (English)
A cyborg whose whole body is artificial. She comes to Cenancle to live with her aunt. Before her conversion into a cyborg, Nene was a normal young girl who came down with an incurable sickness. The only way to save her was to become the world's first full conversion cyborg. By placing her fingers inside Clarion's body, she is able to use the Pandora Device, which allows her to master any skill for a short period of time. These range from wielding firearms to cookery. She is also able to transfer her brain between different artificial bodies.
Clarion (クラリオン, Kurarion)
Voiced by: Manami Numakura (Japanese); Lara Woodhull (English)
Uzal's companion, who is a combat android, disguising as a full-body cyborg. Her body holds the Pandora Device, which temporarily grants Nene enhanced abilities. She is a skilled fighter who often finds herself at the mercy of Nene's admiration and hates having her cat-like ears touched.
Uzal Delilah (ウザル・デリラ, Uzaru Derira)
Voiced by: Atsuko Tanaka (Japanese); Monica Rial (English)
A wealthy inventor who manipulates Nene into working with Clarion to solve the mystery behind the attack. She also goes by the name Sahar Schehera (サハル・セヘラ, Saharu Sehera).
B.U.E.R. (Base of Unearthed Resources) (ブエル (中枢制御装置), Bueru (Chūsū Seigyo Sōchi))
Voiced by: Junpei Morita (Japanese); Sonny Strait (English)
A giant boring robot owned by Uzal's company that possesses a giant laser. While its main body resembles a giant eyeball, its Central Nervous Unit, which detaches itself after the main body is shut down, takes the form a gentlemanly but perverted lion-esque creature with five legs. He tends to be injured by Clarion when acting perverted, or locked in a safe-box to stop Takumi from disassembling and analyzing him, but the darkness traumatizes him.
Takumi Korobase (崑崙八仙 拓美, Korobase Takumi)
Voiced by: Marie Miyake (Japanese); Jad Saxton (English)
Nene's aunt who lives on Cenancle Island and is close friends with Uzal. Takumi is usually overwhelmed with social anxiety and has to hide behind her Gertsecommas whenever somebody sees her face-to-face. She does all her work in cyberspace and never leaves her mansion. The fact that her company produces Gertsecommas which were invented by Uzals company as well as her four-colored hairpin hint that her relationship with Uzal is somewhat like that of Bill Gates with Steve Jobs.
Vlind** * (ブリ○○・○ー○○○, Buri** ****)
Voiced by: Satsumi Matsuda (Japanese); Alex Moore (English)
A television reporter who always get interrupted before she can state her name.
Bunny (バニー, Banī)
Voiced by: Rie Murakawa (Japanese); Leah Clark (English)
A leader of a group of cosplaying rebels against Uzal. She dresses up as a bunny girl.
Robert Altman (ロバート・アルトマン, Robāto Arutoman)
Voiced by: Tetsu Inada (Japanese); Ian Sinclair (English)
A captain of the Cenacle Island military. He is a very kind man who likes helping people.
Ian Kurtz (イアン・クルツ, Ian Kurutsu)
Voiced by: Junichi Suwabe (Japanese); J. Michael Tatum (English)
A mysterious man obsessed with the passing of time, who secretly starts unearthing the B.U.E.R. main body.
Amy Gilliam (エイミー・ギリアム, Eimī Giriamu)
Voiced by: Maria Naganawa (Japanese); Tia Ballard (English)
A girl with a prosthetic leg that befriends B.U.E.R., and later Nene and Clarion.
Anna (アンナ, An'na)
Voiced by: Yorie Terauchi (Japanese); Juli Erickson (English)
An old woman with a prosthetic arm and heart who is saved by Nene and Clarion during a network outage.
Proserpina (プロセルピナ, Puroserupina)
Voiced by: Minami Tsuda (Japanese); Felecia Angelle (English)
Dr. Toto
Voiced by: Takuma Suzuki
Nurse Samantha (ナース・サマンサ, Nāsu Samansa)
Voiced by: Yuko Tachibana (Japanese); Marissa Lenti (English)
Janus North (ジェイナス・ノース, Jeinasu Nōsu)
Voiced by: Ryūzaburō Ōtomo (Japanese); Christopher Sabat (English)
The chairman of the government of Cenacle Island. He along with his secretary were rescued by Nene and Clarion when the island's main department store was attacked. It is implied that he takes bribes and is extremely egocentric.

== Media ==
=== Manga ===
The manga, written and illustrated by Kōshi Rikudō and based on a concept by Masamune Shirow, began publication in Kadokawa Shoten's Newtype Ace magazine on 10 October 2012. This production system changed starting with volume 9 due to the declining health of Rikudō, who continued to handle only the scripts and panel composition. His main assistant, Rin Hitotose, took over the interior artwork entirely. Beginning with the following volume, the US release credits the production as: Original Story: Masamune Shirow; Manga: Kōshi Rikudō; Art: Rin Hitotose. When Newtype Ace ceased publication on 10 July 2013, the series was transferred to Kadokawa's Niconico Ace website, where it resumed publication on 17 September. The series entered its final arc within its 24th volume, released in February 2023 and ended on 20 September 2024. Kadokawa collected the series in 26 volumes, published from 7 March 2013, to 9 November 2024. Seven Seas Entertainment licensed the series for publication in North America.

Glitch Witch, written and character-designed by Shirow, with art by Naoki Azuma, began publication on Young Magazine Web in 2026 and continues the overarching P2501 (the Puppet Master) storyline.

==== Volumes ====
No.	Original release date	Original ISBN	English release date	English ISBN
1	7 March 2013	978-4-04-120645-4	7 July 2015	978-1-626921-90-0
2	8 August 2013	978-4-04-120849-6	20 October 2015	978-1-626922-07-5
3	10 January 2014	978-4-04-120988-2	12 January 2016	978-1-626922-39-6
4	26 June 2014	978-4-04-101682-4	26 April 2016	978-1-626922-60-0
5	26 December 2014	978-4-04-101683-1	12 July 2016	978-1-626922-92-1
6	26 June 2015	978-4-04-103081-3	27 December 2016	978-1-626923-68-3
7	26 December 2015	978-4-04-103781-2	11 April 2017	978-1-626924-57-4
8	26 March 2016	978-4-04-103986-1	29 August 2017	978-1-626925-19-9
9	26 October 2016	978-4-04-104868-9	16 January 2018	978-1-626925-94-6
10	25 March 2017	978-4-04-105442-0	24 April 2018	978-1-626927-26-1
11	8 September 2017	978-4-04-106079-7	26 February 2019	978-1-626928-54-1
12	10 March 2018	978-4-04-106537-2	29 October 2019	978-1-642751-22-2
13	10 July 2018	978-4-04-107143-4	27 October 2020	978-1-64505-456-6
14	10 November 2018	978-4-04-107600-2	28 September 2021	978-1-64827-104-5
15	10 April 2019	978-4-04-108106-8	8 March 2022	978-1-64827-333-9
16	10 September 2019	978-4-04-108675-9	4 July 2023	978-1-63858-202-1
17	10 February 2020	978-4-04-109031-2	30 January 2024	978-1-63858-694-4
18	10 July 2020	978-4-04-109725-0	18 June 2024	978-1-68579-573-3
19	10 November 2020	978-4-04-110807-9	10 December 2024	979-8-89160-053-9
20	10 March 2021	978-4-04-111184-0	3 June 2025	979-8-89160-975-4
21	10 August 2021	978-4-04-111561-9	9 December 2025	979-8-89373-714-1
22	8 January 2022	978-4-04-111562-6	21 July 2026	979-8-89373-715-8
23	8 July 2022	978-4-04-112845-9	29 December 2026	979-8-89561-391-7
24	10 February 2023	978-4-04-112846-6	—	—
25	8 September 2023	978-4-04-114163-2	—	—
26	9 November 2024	978-4-04-115202-7	—	—

=== Anime ===
An anime adaptation by Studio Gokumi and AXsiZ was announced in Kadokawa's Gundam Ace magazine in October 2015. The anime is directed by Munenori Nawa and written by Tatsuya Takahashi, with character designs by Takuya Tani. The anime was first released as a film, which received a limited two-week theatrical release starting on 5 December 2015, before airing as a television series on Tokyo MX between 8 January 2016 and 25 March 2016. The opening theme is "hopeness" by Zaq, while the ending theme song is "LoSe±CoNtRoL" (ルーズコントロール, Rūzu Kontorōru) performed by Sanae Fuku and Manami Numakura. The series is licensed in North America by Funimation, which simulcast the subtitled version as it aired and streamed a broadcast dub version from 12 February 2016, and in Australia by Madman Entertainment, which are streaming the series on AnimeLab. The anime covers material from volume 1 through the middle of volume 8, comprising the manga's first 30 chapters.

==== Episode list ====
No.	Title	Original release date
1	"Adepter" "Tekigō-sha – Adeputa -" (適合者 -アデプタ-)	8 January 2016
In an age of advanced technology, a cyborg named Nene Nanakorobi meets an inventor named Uzal Delilah and her cyborg pet, Clarion, on their way to Cenancle Island. Shortly after the girls arrive on the island, the city comes under attack by an army of robots controlled by a group of rebels who despise Uzal. In order to battle against them, Uzal gives Nene authority to use the Pandora Device inside of Clarion, updating her operating system to temporarily give her the skill to use a gun. After the robots are stopped, Uzal brings Nene to her laboratory where she gives Nene an optical camouflage for when she uses the Pandora Device, before the rebels ask for Uzal's help in stopping a robot that had gone berserk.
2	"Geofront" "Daishin Dochika – Jiofuronto -" (大深度地下 -ジオフロント-)	15 January 2016
Nene and Clarion are tasked with stopping B.U.E.R., a giant boring robot belonging to Uzal's company that went berserk after her underlings tried to use it against her. After the underlings trick B.U.E.R. into firing its laser cannon, Clarion aims to reach its main console while Nene acts as her bodyguard. However, a large piece of rubble interrupts Clarion before she complete her mission, so she instead operates some smaller robots to allow Nene to reach the console and shut B.U.E.R. down. With forces approaching on the laboratory, Uzal detaches B.U.E.R.'s Central Nervous Unit before having Nene and the others escape from the lab as it self-destructs, leaving Clarion in Nene's care. Upon reaching the surface, Nene and the others find themselves surrounded by Cenancle's Defense Force.
3	"Terrarium" "Gisō Kūkan -Terariumu-" (偽装空間 -テラリウム-)	22 January 2016
Thanks to Uzal's efforts, Nene and Clarion are treated like rescued hostages and are escorted to the residence of Nene's aunt, Takumi Korobase, who is acquaintances with Uzal. Later, as Takumi takes a dangerous interest in Clarion's ears, Nene manages to see through a simulation Takumi had placed them in when they arrived and stop her. The next day, Nene and Clarion are approached by one of Uzal's underlings, Bunny, who asks for B.U.E.R.'s authentication key in order to help her comrades. As Bunny delivers the key to a mysterious man named Ian Kurtz, who plans to use it for his own gain, Clarion digs up B.U.E.R.'s central nervous unit.
4	"Kitchen Drudge" "Ryōri no Tetsujin -Kitchin Dorajji-" (料理の鉄人 -キッチン・ドラッジ-)	29 January 2016
After Nene manages to enrol in a prestigious online school, Takumi, wanting to have some time alone to examine B.U.E.R., sends Nene and Clarion to observe some of her companies as part of her homework. With the companies being too aware of Takumi's status to provide any useful information, Nene goes to a charity event where a TV reporter named Prosperina allows her to observe her work. When some thugs suddenly show up and start wrecking the place, Nene and Clarion step up against them, encouraging the other volunteers to stand up against them too. With most of the food ruined by the attack, Nene uses the Pandora Device to learn cooking skills and cook up some replacement meals.
5	"System Down" "Tsūshin Shōgai -Shisutemu Daun-" (通信障害 -システム・ダウン-)	5 February 2016
While pondering if it is right to keep borrowing Clarion's power to achieve world peace, Nene meets an old woman named Anna who is adjusting to a robotic arm. Just then, a network disturbance occurs across the entire island, causing almost all of its systems and transportation to shut down. Nene and Clarion soon come across a man named Robert, who helps out everyone they comes across and manages to stop a pair of thieves, before coming across Anna, whose life is in danger because of the disturbance affecting her artificial organs. Using the Pandora Device, Nene becomes a paramedic to treat Anna's symptoms and take her to the hospital. After the network is restored, Nene is thanked by Anna for saving her, while Robert, who is part of the island's defense force, is given a task by Kurtz.
6	"Central Nervous Unit" "Konpaku -Sentoraru Nābasu Yunitto-" (魂魄 -セントラル・ナーバス・ユニット-)	12 February 2016
Nene goes in for a medical checkup at hospital, where a girl named Amy Gilliam is also visiting to have a new leg installed, only to find her cat Lean has sneaked in as well. While searching for Lean, Amy comes across B.U.E.R., who joins her in her search. The two are soon found by Nene and Clarion while Anna manages to find Leon and reunite her with Amy. When Amy rips her dress before her appointment, Nene uses the Pandora Device to become a couturier and sew it back together, allowing her to go to her appointment with a smile. When they return to the park, they find it has been completely torn down, with its residents evacuated by the CDF. As they pass by Kurtz, Clarion is cautious of a cyborg following behind him.
7	"Puppeteer" "Ningyō-shi -Papettia-" (人形師 -パペッティア-)	19 February 2016
A family of robot thieves known as the Chicken Brothers catch Clarion off guard and capture Nene. As Clarion tracks the thieves down to their hideout, Nene comes across all the other androids the thieves had taken and, upon reuniting with Clarion, uses the Pandora Device to take control of them and stop the thieves.
8	"Inferno" "Daikasai -Inferuno-" (大火災 -インフェルノ-)	26 February 2016
Nene and Clarion go to the Herme's department store, where government chairman Janus North is serving as manager-for-a-day. Following another network disturbance, North and his secretary become stuck in an elevator with Nene and Clarion. The group manage to find their way out of the elevator, only to discover a fire has broken out across the entire department store. Wanting to help North and the secretary escape, Nene uses her Pandora Device skills to create a fireproof cart and lead them to the emergency stairs. Spotting a boy still trapped in the fire, Nene goes back to rescue him despite Clarion's warnings, using what little oxygen she has to keep him alive. Putting Nene's wishes over her own common sense, Clarion manages to catch up to her and get both Nene and the boy out safely.
9	"Assault" "Kichi Kyōshū -Asaruto-" (基地強襲 -アサルト-)	4 March 2016
The fire at the department store is revealed to have been caused by a laser fired from B.U.E.R.'s body after Kurtz tries to hack into it. Deducing this herself and deciding not to get Nene involved, Clarion approaches Takumi about B.U.E.R. going out of control again and borrows some of her robots for an assault on Uzal's base in order to stop it. Making her way past Bunny and her robot defenses, Clarion soon comes up against Kurtz' cyborg bodyguard, Fear.
10	"Fear" "Kyōfu -Fia-" (恐怖 -フィア-)	11 March 2016
Nene wakes up to find Clarion has gone, leaving behind a note saying not to involved, and begins feeling lonely without her around. Meanwhile, Robert receives a confidential message from Uzal warning him about Kurtz' plans to use B.U.E.R. As Nene struggles to try and do things by herself, she receives some helpful advice from Robert before learning from B.U.E.R. about what Clarion is actually involved in. Meanwhile, Clarion brings out her strongest weapons against Fear, who is revealed to be an android, but is caught off guard when it targets Bunny. Wanting to help Clarion, Nene sneaks out with B.U.E.R.'s help to go and find her.
11	"Ghost Urn" "Kokoro no Arika -Gōsuto Ān-" (心の在処 -ゴーストURN-)	18 March 2016
Nene infiltrates the base, where she gets mistaken for a dummy robot and temporarily shut down by Kurtz. While B.U.E.R. follows Kurtz, Nene finds herself in the disposal area with Bunny, who tasks her with diving into the base's system and finding a way out before they are disposed of. Remembering when she started out moving her cyborg, Nene manages to move about freely in cyberspace and unlock the emergency hatch. While Bunny heads off to save her allies, B.U.E.R. attempts to stop Kurtz from hacking his main body only to be thwarted by Takumi's own hacking attempts. As Nene reaches the central room and is confronted by Fear, she is aided by the arrival of Clarion, who managed to survive Fear's attack. Wanting to help Clarion protect the island, Nene uses the Pandora Device and joins Clarion is facing up against Fear.
12	"Elpis" "Kibō -Erupisu-" (希望 -エルピス-)	25 March 2016
Nene uses her ability to support Clarion as she fights against Fear, allowing her to destroy it. Meanwhile, B.U.E.R.'s defenses are taken down by Takumi, allowing Kurtz to activate it. Instead of gaining control, however, Kurtz is shocked to find that all he has done is leaked B.U.E.R.'s collection of panty shots across the world. As B.U.E.R. goes on a rampage out of pure embarrassment, Uzal gets in contact with Nene, stating that B.U.E.R. must be stopped by using Clarion to activate his self-destruct system. Not wanting to lose Clarion, Nene chooses a riskier alternative, going inside of B.U.E.R. and managing to calm him down. After Uzal sinks B.U.E.R.'s body and seals off the geofront, Nene and Clarion resume their everyday life of seeking world peace together.
