= List of Excel Saga characters =

This list contains the primary and notable secondary characters of Excel Saga, a Japanese manga and anime series.

== Creation ==
The Excel Saga anime characters were designed by Ishino Satoshi.

== ACROSS ==
=== Excel ===
Voiced by: Kotono Mitsuishi (Japanese); Jessica Calvello (episodes 1-13) and Larissa Wolcott (episodes 14-26) (English)

Excel (エクセル, Ekuseru), the title character, was initially the sole officer of ACROSS. Excel approaches her work with an excess of determination and enthusiasm, but a lack of foresight and understanding. She is both impossibly lucky and unthinkably unlucky, yet she never manages to complete a mission without help, and even her successes are usually attained by happenstance. In the anime, she has a tendency to speak extremely quickly and frequently refers to herself in the third person. She displays a schoolgirl crush towards Il Palazzo that borders on fanatic obsession, even going as far as to converse with a picture of him while home alone. For an extended period of time in later volumes of the manga, Excel suffers from memory loss, and lives with the Shiouji family under the assumed name, Teriha Shiouji, while Ropponmatsu, disguised as Excel herself, takes her place in the ACROSS ranks.

In the English dub, voice actress Jessica Calvello damaged her voice after the 13th episode, and was replaced by Larissa Walcott for the second half of the series.

=== Il Palazzo ===
Voiced by: Takehito Koyasu (Japanese); Jason Douglas (English)

Il Palazzo (イルパラッゾ, Iru Parazzo) is the leader of ACROSS. Lord Il Palazzo often prefaces his orders and speeches by proclaiming, "The world is corrupt!" He has little patience for Excel, often assigning complex operations to Hyatt. While presented as a mostly dark and serious character in the original manga, the anime lightens the tone with the recurring gag that, despite all his scheming, Il Palazzo really has nothing to do while Excel and Hyatt are out on missions: he is often seen pursuing surprisingly ordinary hobbies like learning to play the guitar and arranging domino blocks. These foibles notwithstanding, Il's yellow, cat-like eyes and seemingly supernatural powers illustrate his superhuman nature, and both manga and anime make it clear that Lord Il Palazzo suffers from severe psychological disorders, most notably multiple personality disorder.

=== Hyatt ===
Voiced by: Omi Minami (Japanese); Monica Rial (English)

Hyatt (ハイアット, Haiatto) is Excel's frail junior officer, with a tendency to cough huge amounts of blood, drop dead and suddenly spring back to life in quick succession. In the original manga, Hyatt joins ACROSS by simply answering an advert placed by Il Palazzo; the anime, meanwhile, states that she is a mysterious princess from space (supposedly) with a connection to the Puuchuus and Space Butler. Her curious medical condition is never explained in detail, neither in the manga nor in the anime (although later volumes of the manga hint that Il Palazzo has implanted something in her body that is causing it—and it is implied in the anime that, as she is from Mars, Earth's atmosphere is bad for her lungs). In both the anime and the manga, she is noticeably Il Palazzo's favorite officer, usually receiving lighter punishment and higher promotions than Excel. Despite this, the two girls usually get along just fine, and Excel even calls her "Ha-chan" while Hyatt calls her senpai.

=== Elgala ===
Elgala (エルガーラ, Erugāra) is the third agent of ACROSS and Excel's rival for Il Palazzo's affections. She is cursed with the inability to maintain an internal monologue, constantly speaking aloud her innermost thoughts and feelings. Since Elgala is a snob who thinks nearly everyone is below her, these thoughts are often of the disparaging variety and frequently irritate Excel. Elgala has refined, and expensive tastes, which does not suit the austerity demanded by Excel, leading to frequent conflict. Adding to tension with Excel is the secrecy surrounding Elgala's missions for Il Palazzo. Elgala only appears in the manga.

== Department of City Security ==
Paralleling Il Palazzo's Across is Kabapu's Department of City Security. Kabapu himself occupies a position of inscrutable power in the city, and is able to bend its political establishment to his will. Despite his power, he is an object of ridicule among most of his subordinates due to his appearance, mannerisms, and seeming disregard for lives and laws. Unfazed by this, he informs the six members of the Department that they are to assume the role of the Daitenzin, a sentai fighting force. One Daitenzin is Tooru Watanabe, who pins his hopes for a romantic relationship with Hyatt on his position in the civil service but grows despondent as the nature of his employment becomes clear. Another is Daimaru Sumiyoshi, who is a voice of reason in the Department and is represented as communicating through free-floating text. The third, Norikuni Iwata, is generally disliked for his boorishness but tolerated by his co-workers. Misaki Matsuya, the fourth, is an attractive but ruthless young woman who provides much of the group's leadership. The final Daitenzin are two android bomb-disposal experts called Ropponmatsu Unit 1 and Ropponmatsu Unit 2. Other associates of the Department are Kabapu's assistant Ms. Momochi, and the lolita complex-stricken Gojo Shioji, designer of the Ropponmatsus.

=== Kabapu ===
Voiced by: Ryūzaburō Ōtomo (Japanese); Mike Kleinhenz (English)

Kabapu (蒲腐) is a large man with a very strange hairstyle and a gigantic removable mustache, Kabapu occupies a position of extreme and shadowy power which is never fully explained, but municipal leaders defer to his wishes, and he has no qualms about silencing dissent by violence. This zeal is a result of his genuine desire to protect the City from all dangers. His trump card is his newly founded Department of City Security, the civilian front for his Municipal Force Daitenzin, into which Watanabe, Iwata, Sumiyoshi, Misaki, and Ropponmatsu are recruited. In later volumes of the manga, Kabapu reveals himself as a survivor of an ancient city called "Solaria", similar to Atlantis, which had brought about its own downfall. He proclaims that his mission is to destroy any remaining Solarian technology so humanity can't misuse it. Both the anime and the manga suggest that he and Il Palazzo are old acquaintances.

=== Toru Watanabe ===
Voiced by: Ryōtarō Okiayu (Japanese); Jay Hickman (English)

Toru Watanabe (渡辺通, Watanabe Tōru) is a Japanese twenty-something. Watanabe lives next door to Excel and Hyatt, and close to Norikuni Iwata and Daimaru Sumiyoshi, men whose company he at first detests. Watanabe is infatuated with Hyatt, who seems unaware of his advances. In order to impress her, he claims to be a civil servant and undertakes a position at the Department of City Security to redeem his lie. Much to his consternation, Iwata and Sumiyoshi are hired by the Department at the same time as he. Watanabe is extremely irritable and often reacts to situations with over-the-top emotions: e.g., in the manga allows his feelings for Hyatt to repeatedly compromise his career. He pretty much rues his roommate Iwata's existence. While he starts off as a reasonably normal guy, his appearance and personality change drastically in the manga after his plans to marry Chihaya (Hyatt) are ruined by Il Palazzo taking her back. He ends up being very withdrawn, spiteful, and cynical; and takes up playing S&M video games.

=== Norikuni Iwata ===
Voiced by: Shōtarō Morikubo (Japanese); Mark Laskowski (English)

Norikuni Iwata (岩田紀國, Iwata Norikuni) is a brash, self-centered employee of the Department of City Security. Heavily infatuated with Matsuya and Ropponmatsu Unit 1, Iwata is generally disliked but tolerated by his neighbors and co-workers. His tendency to make inappropriate statements towards women and his rivalry with Ropponmatsu Unit 2 often lead to him being physically assaulted. In volume eight of the manga, Iwata suddenly dies of colon cancer, but is promptly resurrected as a cyborg, with his brain placed into an android replica of his normal body, as created by Shioji.

=== Daimaru Sumiyoshi ===
From left to right: the luckless Watanabe, obnoxious Iwata, and the silent but sensible Sumiyoshi

Daimaru Sumiyoshi (住吉大丸, Sumiyoshi Daimaru) is a voice of reason and understanding in the Department, although he is often the butt of jokes. His most notable quirk is his dialogue, which in the original manga is rendered as text that is unconstrained by bubbles or captions, and simply floats by his head, in comparison to the normal speech balloons used by all the other characters. The anime rendered this unusual trait by making the character mute, with his dialogue appearing as written text that hovers beside him. He communicates with an Okayama accent in the manga and in the Kansai dialect in the anime. These are respectively rendered as the Geordie dialect of England and American southern accent in the English translations of the manga and anime. The manga showcases Sumiyoshi's hobby and greatest feat: documenting all dating simulation games on his complex PC system. The anime, showing his fondness for Ropponmatsu 2, hints at his interest. The manga also features the rest of his family. His 13-year-old sister, Kanal, also speaks in floating text, but is adorable and looks nothing like Daimaru. His mother and father also appear, his father appearing normal but with an accent, and his mother looking very much like Daimaru but speaking normally. He also has an ambiguous relationship with Ropponmatsu 2, spending a great deal of time with her, and being much more affectionate to her than he is to the older Ropponmatsu 1. He is also a friend of Shiouji's, the two bonding over their love of dating game image files.

=== Misaki Matsuya ===
Voiced by: Yuka Imai (Japanese); Tiffany Grant (English)

Misaki Matsuya (松屋美咲, Matsuya Misaki) : The attractive and intelligent recruit to the Department of City Security, Matsuya is pragmatic and fiercely independent. She is also talented and vicious at repelling Iwata's frequent leers and advances. The manga reveals that she and Iwata were college classmates and that, to her embarrassment, she bears him some genuine affection. She grows closer to Iwata as the series progresses, striking him far less frequently than normal. The only time she seems to feel the need to do so is when Iwata is being idiotic even by his standards, such as trying to track down Excel by telling a young woman that he's looking for "Naked women". Excel Saga English manga adaptor Carl Gustav Horn notes that she "carries the sobering responsibility of being one of the few people in the cast to possess an ounce of sense." On the volume 15 inside cover, Koshi describes her as being "hard on the outside, soft on the inside...tsundere?"

=== Ropponmatsu ===
Ropponmatsu Unit 1 - Voiced by: Satsuki Yukino (Japanese); Kelli Cousins (English)
Ropponmatsu Unit 2 - Voiced by: Satomi Kōrogi (Japanese); Kira Vincent-Davis (English)

Ropponmatsu, Units 1 and 2 (六本松1式・2式, Ropponmatsu Ichishiki・Nishiki) The Ropponmatsus are gynoids designed to be a general-purpose, if beautiful, tool for Kabapu. The original Ropponmatsu is a full-figured woman, however, her material density gives her an extremely large weight, and she fails her first mission in bomb disposal. A second Ropponmatsu, Unit 2, was created in the form of a lightweight perky, young cat-girl.

In the manga, only one Ropponmatsu unit is active at any one time; the reason for this is later revealed to be that there is only one central "core" that is switched between the two bodies. Kabapu attests that the core contains the soul of the princess of the lost civilization of Solaria, and he has had the Ropponmatsu body created to house it as part of his plan to destroy all remaining traces of Solaria's technology. Conversely, the anime (produced before this revelation occurred in the manga), has the Ropponmatsus appearing as two distinct entities who frequently cooperate on important tasks. Although they have a tendency to be destroyed on their missions, Shiouji keeps a lot of spares, which play a large role in the penultimate episode of the series. The vast difference between the units leads to some tension between Kabapu and Shioji: both incarnations of Ropponmatsu have a tendency to fail in the course of their duty, due either to extreme mass (Unit 1) or lack of appropriate functionality (Unit 2).

When Excel and Elgala are lost at sea, Il Palazzo creates the ILL Corporation and takes over much of the city's business and resources. He names Excel the president of the corporation, but she is actually Ropponmatsu I, renamed Isshiki. She runs the business until the Department of City Security starts to regain power.^{[vol. 15-16]} She still has the same limitations, especially her weight, when her power fails, she almost breaks Elgala's back.^{[vol. 17]} She is extremely powerful, but will stand down if the situation is not threatening. The Department of City Security tries to retrieve her in the later chapters, as she is somehow linked to Iwata's life, however, Excel surprisingly switches bodies with her.^{[vol. 23]}

In the later chapters, Shioji is able to restart Nishiki as a separate entity, and sends her to go after Ishiki.^{[vol. 22-23]}

=== Gojo Shiouji ===
Voiced by: Kazuhiko Inoue (Japanese); Spike Spencer (English)

Gojo Shiouji (四王子五条, Shiōji Gojō) is the brilliant creator of the Ropponmatsus and of Kabapu's "mecha." Excel Saga, the anime, constantly suggests that he is a pedophile, but the manga later expands on this to reveal a much more complex back story. Gojo's father, Tenmangu Shiouji, was lauded as one of the world's most foremost scientists, but vanished when Gojo was young. His mother, Miwa Rengaya, suffered a severe behavioral change after Tenmangu disappeared, becoming overtly sexual and showering affection on Gojo, imprinting on him a distorted perception of women. This perception was shattered when Gojo met his young cousin, Umi Rengaya, and was inspired by her purity and innocence. Unfortunately, Umi - who now works as Gojo's laboratory assistant and intern - is now eighteen years old, and lacking in the innocence of her youth, so Gojo has turned his attention to other young girls in the hopes of recapturing that spirit of purity and inspiration.

== Supporting characters ==
In addition to the main cast, Excel Saga features a wide array of secondary characters, and among the most important are the anime's director Nabeshin and the Great Will of the Macrocosm. These two have the power to alter or "reset" the storyline, and Excel and others often appeal for them to do so. Other cast additions in the anime include Pedro and his son Sandora, who both suffer cruel turns of fate and eventually become Nabeshin's students. Their objective is to defeat That Man, who desires to become a god by seducing the Great Will and Pedro's "Sexy Wife." Another prominent force introduced by the anime are the Puchuus, a race of insidiously cute aliens competing with Across for world conquest. Dr. Sekifumi Iwata (who the manga reveals is a cousin of the Daitenzin Norikuni Iwata) and his associate, Nurse Shiki Fukuya, provide some comedic interludes in the anime but make more substantial appearances in the manga. Finally, Rikdo spends several chapters of the manga introducing and developing other members of the Iwata, Sumiyoshi and Shioji families. Particularly notable is Shioji's mother Miwa Rengaya, whom Kabapu views as key to finding Shioji's mysteriously vanished father, Tenmangu Shioji, but who clearly has a secret enigmatic agenda of her own that is at cross purposes with Kabapu's own desires.

=== Menchi ===
Voiced by: Satomi Koorogi (Japanese); Hilary Haag (English)

Menchi (メンチ; lit. "mincemeat") is Excel's "pet" dog that also fulfills the role of "emergency rations". Despite numerous threats, Excel comes to care for her after a fashion. Hyatt, though, more intently views Menchi as a ration. In the manga, Menchi gains an apparent ally in Elgâla, only for her to come to view the dog as an emergency food supply as well. Several anime and manga plots, notably episodes ten and nineteen, revolve to some extent around Menchi, her past, and her quest to escape Excel.

=== Sekifumi Iwata ===
Uniformly depicted as a horrible, lecherous doctor, Dr. Iwata owes his prominence in the medical profession mostly to family influence. His most distinct physical feature is the X-shaped scar across his entire face, which was given to him by a four-year-old Norikuni Iwata, his cousin, whom he has come to hate since then. His likeness and character are parodies of Osamu Tezuka's Black Jack. Although several chapters of the manga revolve around him or his hospital, he only has cameo appearances in the anime.

=== Shiki Fukuya ===
This competent nurse spends most of her time trying to prevent or punish Dr. Iwata's malpractices and misogynies. The manga reveals that she was assigned this role by the Iwata family to guard it against embarrassments caused by Dr. Iwata. She appears along with Dr. Iwata in his cameos in the anime.

=== Hiyoko Iwata ===
A distant relative of Sekifumi and Norikuni Iwata, Hiyoko has a short attention span and often wanders away from her bodyguards. She appears only in the manga.

=== Umi Rengaya ===
The 18-year-old cousin of Professor Gojo Shiouji (the creator of the Ropponmatsu units), and serves both as his intern and lab assistant. Absent minded, easily flustered, and accident prone Umi is nevertheless very kindhearted, and hardworking; although her personality combined with her general clumsiness amounts to a great deal of trouble for the Professor, and his work. Umi is an avid cosplayer, being shown in a multitude of different parody-esque outfits throughout the course of the series, which regularly proves to be a source of irritation to her crush and employer Shiouji. Umi's first appearance is Volume 12 of the manga, but does not become a prominent character until volume 15, when she becomes the caretaker of the amnesiatic Excel (given the name Teriha Shiouji.) Umi Rengaya only appears in the manga.

== Anime-only characters ==
=== Rikdo Koshi ===
Voiced by: Wataru Takagi (Japanese); Paul Sidello (English)

Rikdo Koshi (六道神士, Rikudō Kōshi) is the author of the Excel Saga manga, but he has only one appearance in the story proper of the anime - namely, when he is killed in the first episode by Excel under orders from Lord Il Palazzo. He does, however, narrate the beginning of every episode, voluntarily—usually—giving his approval to the episode's ostensible genre. Also, as a parody of the struggle manga artists often find themselves in with anime adaptations of their work, Nabeshin and Rikudo come to blows, especially towards the anime's end.

=== The Great Will of the Macrocosm ===
Voiced by: Yuko Mizutani (Japanese); Kelly Manison (English)

The Great Will of the Macrocosm (大宇宙の大いなる意思, Daiuchū no Ōinaru Ishi) appears in the form of galaxy with arms (and lips, when necessary), and has the power to reset or alter the storyline. In later episodes she is torn between her love for Pedro and the power over her held by That Man. Episode nineteen reveals that she and Pedro's sexy wife are actually the same being.

=== Nabeshin ===
Voiced by: Shinichi Watanabe (Japanese); Brett Weaver (English)

Nabeshin (ナベシン, Nabeshin), also known as Afro-man and the Director, is dressed in the likeness of Monkey Punch's Lupin III and sporting a giant afro. Like the Great Will, he is a walking deus ex machina, and appeals are often made to him in that capacity, but apart from cameos in the main storyline he keeps himself to his own subplot with Pedro and That Man.

=== Pedro ===
Voiced by: Takashi Nagasako (Japanese); Rob Mungle (English)

Pedro (ペドロ, Pedoro) : Pedro is a Colombian immigrant living in F City. Having died while working on a construction project, he wanders the Earth as a spirit, trying to return to his "sexy wife," who has shacked up with Gomez, Pedro's ostensible friend and co-worker, who is really That Man in disguise. Nabeshin later explains that Pedro's ultimate purpose is to become an "Afro-Warrior" under his tutelage, and to fight That Man for the fate of the world.

That Man (center) prepares to attack the Afro-warriors (top to bottom: Nabeshin, Pedro, and Sandora), as the Great Will and Pedro's "Sexy Wife" look on in terror.

=== Puchuu ===
Voiced by: Omi Minami (Japanese); Kira Vincent-Davis (English)

The Puchuu (プチュウ, Puchū) : Aliens from outer space who invade Earth in the second and twenty-second episodes, with other frequent appearances. Physically very weak, and shaped like teddy-bears, Puchuu rely on their cuteness to lull potential victims before attack—only Excel and Misaki are depicted as being immune to their cuteness. Once struck with enough force and/or defeated, they are shown to have a face similar to Golgo 13 and their English voices have them sound like Saddam Hussein, although special Puchuu have unique faces and other voices. When their main fleet, led by the Puchuu overlord, arrives in Earth orbit in episode twenty-two, it is repelled by an alliance of Puchuu rebels led by Excel. Debris from the decisive space battle falls to Earth and utterly annihilates F City.

=== Sara Cosette ===
Voiced by: Akiko Yajima (Japanese), Mandy Clark (English)

First encountered in episode eight, Sara is a cute, pink-haired, child-sized assassin, who disguises herself as an eight-year-old girl to facilitate her work. Taken with Hyatt, she views Excel with derision. Sara was orphaned earlier, and became an assassin to survive. The Great Will takes pity on her and resets her mother at the end of the episode. However, in episode twenty-six, she becomes a special member of ACROSS, having learned that she could not so easily forget her bloody past. In this episode, it is also revealed that she may be an adult midget, and not a child in a scene where she is revealed to be extremely well endowed and hirsute- "I'm a G-cup!", she joyously yells as her previously strapped-down breasts burst explosively free of their confines. Although in episode twenty-six, she repeatedly refers to herself as being nine years old, creating ambiguity as to her actual age.

=== Excel Girls ===
Voiced by: Yumiko Kobayashi and Mikako Takahashi (Japanese); Cynthia Martinez and Sheri Sims (English)
Excel Kobayashi and Mikako Hyatt are a pair of self-promoting, neophyte voice actresses who cosplay as Excel and Hyatt and perform the opening song "Ai (Chuuseishin)" as the Excel Girls. They appear in only three episodes (Episodes 5, 9, and 13) of the anime, in which they often receive much comedic physical abuse at the hands of the real Excel.

=== That Man ===
Voiced by: Wataru Takagi (Japanese); Mike MacRae (English)

That Man (あの人, Ano Hito) is the most powerful leader of ACROSS, and Pedro's and Nabeshin's nemesis. "That Man" poses as a friend to Pedro and seduces both Pedro's sexy wife and the Great Will. That Man is part of the ACROSS Six, the governing body of ACROSS, and longs to use "the power of the Great Will and the devilishness of the woman" to take over the universe.
