= Dotto! Koni-chan =

Japanese anime television series

ドッと!KONIちゃん
- Anime television series
- Directed by: Shinichi Watanabe (1–13); Shintarou Inokawa (1–13) (Note: Assistant Director (副監督). See the Shaft director credits legend.); Kenji Yasuda (14–26)
- Produced by: Mitsutoshi Kubota (Shaft); Nobuhiro Oosawa (Genco)
- Written by: Masaharu Amiya
- Music by: Toshio Masuda
- Studio: Shaft
- Original network: Animax
- Original run: November 26, 2000 – May 29, 2001
- Episodes: 26 (78 segments)

Dotto! Koni-chan (ドッと!KONIちゃん) is a Japanese anime television series directed by Shinichi Watanabe and animated by Shaft. It aired on Animax from November 26, 2000, to May 29, 2001, and was produced by Animax and Genco.

== Plot ==
The series revolves around a boy named Koni, who is the center of attention. He can be whatever he wants, a lifeguard, a fireman, a samurai, or an astronaut. He is the luckiest boy in the whole world, and everything goes well for him. Koni always lives crazy adventures with his friends High, Moro and Nari, and his dog Afro.

== Characters ==
- Koni-chan (KONIちゃん, KONI-chan): The main character, an oversized boy. He is modeled after sumo wrestler Konishiki Yasokichi. Koni is a singer, an athlete, an astronaut, a salesman and is anything he wants to be. It's powerful, people all over the world love it, and as the narrator says, the crowd applauds it. He's the luckiest guy in the world, he buys a single ice cream and gets the "another one" on the stick to get another ice cream free of charge, and so on. Without a doubt, quite a character. It's kind of Nari's "platonic love" during one episode.
- High: He is a hyperactive, mischievous and intelligent boy, but woe betide anyone who crosses his path, since he has terrible outbursts of rage, to the point that many times he has a flame of fire that runs through his entire body that burns everyone. He is in love with Moro.
- Moro: A girl with pink hair held in pigtails. She thinks of herself as the "sex symbol" of the show. She believes that she can solve everything with her beauty. She is a good friend, wants to be famous, and wants to marry a man of money (preferably an old man from whom she can inherit a large fortune). On several occasions she tries to conquer Koni (because he is famous and the center of everyone's attention), which makes her a loving rival to Lovely-sensei.
- Nari: A boy who wears glasses. He is a millionaire and egomaniacal child and believes that everything in life can be solved with money (and he always walks around with 10,000 yen bills). He loves round things and hence, in one chapter, he is totally attracted to Koni. In addition, he loves to fly.
- Afro: Koni's talking pet dog. As his name implies, he has an afro.
- Lovely-sensei: High, Moro and Nari's elementary school teacher. One day she fell in love with Koni, and because of this she always chases him.
- Emi: An android girl with a TV for a head. Named after the company Toshiba-EMI.
- Pesome: A green hand puppet.
