= Rapture TV =

Ownership
- Owner: UK Television Ltd

History
- Launched: 22 November 1997

Links
- Website: www.rapturetv.com

Availability

Streaming media

Rapture TV was a previously free-to-air satellite television station (although later an exclusively online channel) operated from the United Kingdom, founded in 1997. Focusing mostly on electronic dance music and extreme sports, it is notable for the number of times it has failed financially only to be relaunched.

== History ==
=== 1997-2001 ===
The channel was initially launched by the United Business Media group as a cable television channel on 22 November 1997. Due to common UBM ownership, the channel shared facilities with, and was broadcast from, the Anglia Television studios in Norwich. The channel was later carried free-to-view on the analogue transponder of FilmFour on Astra 1A at weekends, and eventually used this transponder full-time, until closing its analogue service on 12 December 1999. Shortly before this, on 27 October 1999, the channel had moved to digital broadcasting via Sky Digital, where it launched in the general entertainment section of the EPG.

Rapture made agreements with cable companies in 1999, starting with NTL in January 1999, adding 700,000 potential households, and later in September with Cable & Wireless, effective 16 October, adding 850,000 potential households. The agreement with CWC also enabled the production of five programmes for CWC's Local Channel. In May 1999, it announced that Rapture TV would start a seven-day service from March 2000, a move that would double its production output. Rapture made a production agreement with BBC Choice to produce Problem Page, presented by Heather Darroch. In October 1999, Rapture TV made its first acquisition, Clubavision, produced by London Weekend Television, as well as an agreement with Channel 4 to relay thirty hours of its output per week. The channel made its first outside broadcast on 13 November 1999 at the Slope X snowboarding festival in Battersea Park. For New Year's Eve, the channel planned to air a five-part documentary about Radio 1 DJ Carl Cox's two gigs in Sydney and Honolulu.

A notable feature of the station during this time was its "Mouse Cam", broadcast as a time filler when the station was off-air. This featured some mice in a Habitrail-like setup, with shots changing between cameras. The station also featured one of the first SMS-based request shows during this era. A launch to ITV Digital was planned at this time, but never came to completion.

Co-founder Debbie Mason quit the channel in late January 2000, to spend more time with her family. The channel started its seven-day schedule on 7 February 2000, nearly a month ahead of the initial March 2000 target. Richard Kilgarriff left the channel in March, starting a platform of his own instead. Shortly afterwards, the channel announced a one-off celebrity special of That Film Show presented by Neil Stuke. Hobbins Sides devised a new identity for the channel in 2000, being implemented from 1 May that year. On 24 July, the channel was made available full-time on Sky Digital.

Rapture started facing difficulties in September 2000. On 27 September a meeting was being held at the now-defunct Rapture TV studio at Anglia's facilities, eyeing a massive cut of its staff, which before the crisis was estimated to be at 40. After the cuts were announced, Rapture greenlighted its first independent commission, Club Class and a co-production with Ministry of Sound to broadcast a concert held at the Millennium Dome.

=== 2001 shutdown, first relaunch ===
The channel had never been profitable, and its average audiences were in the region of 100,000. UBM placed the channel on the market in January 2001, but as it was unable to find a buyer, UBM announced in September that it would close the channel later in 2001, pending a consultation regarding the date of its closedown, with the loss of 46 jobs and debts estimated at £12 million, before closing down on 31 October, notably playing "Rapture" by iio as its final track over pictures of the station staff. During this time, it had refocused almost entirely on dance music, and had moved to the music section of the EPG.

In April 2002, the channel's assets were bought by Edinburgh based independent production company Power TV, who had previously produced some shows for the channel. A temporary relaunch occurred to Channel 232 in June 2002, and lasted until August of the same year, when problems caused it to close again.

=== 2003 relaunch ===
In November 2002, Power TV appointed Feel to devise the next look for Rapture, eyeing a possible relaunch of the channel in 2003. It was again relaunched on 12 May 2003 on EPG channel 265. Recurring financial issues, aggravated by the technical failure of a premium-rate SMS service on the channel which would have brought in funding, and various other problems, left the channel in a precarious state. By April 2004 it was running on an almost autopilot, having moved (again) to EPG channel 205, with a somewhat randomised playlist of a few videos, reruns of old club nights overnight, and extreme sports in the day.

In July 2004, the channel ran out of money terminally, a potential purchase by Video Interactive Television fell through and the channel ceased to broadcast and was removed from the Sky EPG. Plans for its relaunch were kept active, however. Its named holding company, Rapture TV (Scotland), which was incorporated in 2002, was wound up in 2005.

In December 2004, the channel returned in part-time format after an agreement with The Musicians' Channel, an FTA educational channel. The arrangement occupied the 12am to 12pm timeslot.

The story of Rapture TV has been a defining one for the birth of digital satellite. With the increase in capacity, and lower cost base, a whole host of such channels were launched, with most languishing at unpopular EPG locations, or even outside the EPG. Although the satellite TV became cheaper to enter, many operators rushed onto the scene without a viable business plan that would make money. Unlike other such channels, Rapture TV has refused to disappear.

=== 2005 relaunch ===
Ahead of its return to the air, Rapture TV bought programming to fill its new line-up. The channel relaunched on Sky Digital broadcasting from Eutelsat 28A on 14 November 2005, after some time awaiting an EPG number from Sky – a period of time which was deemed excessive enough to warrant a complaint to OFCOM by the channel. At the same time it was awarded a five-year contract with Arqiva for satellite uplink.

The re-launched Rapture TV showed clubbing and extreme sports, programming that the channel is well known for, as well as new programmes from genres such as comedy and drama, such as the BBC Scotland series Tinsel Town. In addition, programmes focusing on computer games and technology, including Cybernet (previously seen on ITV) and G@mers, an in-house production were added to the lineup. The channel also broadcast feature films. Dance music content, which made up much of the channels output on previous editions, was retained, with the addition of Underground, a hardcore dance show presented by Jon Doe of CLSM.

The channel launched a broadband simulcast in March 2006, and claims to be the first UK based entertainment channel to launch such a service.

In July 2006, the channel started airing titles from ADV Films UK's catalogue (marking its return to linear TV in the UK, a year after finishing its run of Excel Saga on Sci-Fi), beginning with Mezzo DSA.

In September 2006, Rapture lodged a complaint with OFCOM against BSkyB, claiming "BSkyB is charging excessively high fees for the supply of a EPG service on the UK's only DSat platform". This was furthered on 23 February 2007 with Rapture submitting further evidence to OFCOM in regard to what they felt was "Bullying" on the part of BSkyB. The complaint was furthered just under a week before Virgin Media removed BSkyB's Basic channels from their service after an unsuccessful round of negotiations in regard to the worth of the channels. Ofcom rejected this complaint.

=== 2007 ===
On 19 March 2007, BSkyB decided to remove Rapture TV from their EPG based on the fact that Rapture TV had failed to pay for a slot in the EPG. Rapture TV was available on the BSkyB platform on channel 193.

On 25 April 2007, Rapture published a statement that outlined the temporary cut off of the channel, whilst giving details of upgrading the site with more content and on-demand video.

On 9 May 2007 a case brought by Rapture TV to Ofcom concerning the BSkyB EPG (Electronic Programme Guide) went to Appeal at the Competition Commission Appeals Tribunal (CAT). The hearing was heard on 18 and 19 December 2007.

=== Rapture TV Live ===
On 12 June 2007, Rapture relaunched its live stream, which initially broadcast R:Muzik 24/7 but now also broadcast programmes from the Rapture archive. A week beforehand the stream was trialled unsuccessfully using peercast. The free stream was a temporary measure, and in the future was likely going to be replaced with a high quality paid service. In October 2007, a new feature was added enabling viewers to select music videos to play on the live stream for free via the Rapture website.

=== 2008 ===
On 31 March 2008, the Competition Commission Appeals Tribunal released their judgement, in which they unanimously dismissed the appeal.

Rapture continued to be very vocally critical of Sky and the various related Murdoch companies on public forums for some time before focusing their efforts elsewhere.

=== 2009 ===
Rapture attempted to restart their satellite broadcast presence in an audio-only capacity by broadcasting several shows for satellite radio broadcaster RTI, Radio Tatras International (Sky channel 0195), a British-Slovak station. These broadcasts took place on 17 and 24 January 2009.
