= Shinichi Watanabe =

Japanese anime director and voice actor

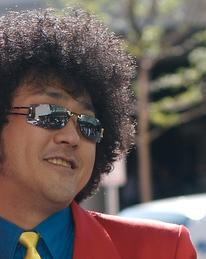
Shinichi Watanabe dressed in the style of his 'Nabeshin' character.

Shinichi Watanabe (渡邊 慎一, Watanabe Shin'ichi; born September 6, 1964) is a Japanese anime director and voice actor. He is best known for his over-the-top adaptation of Rikdo Koshi's Excel Saga, in which he appears as the character Nabeshin.

Watanabe stated that the nickname Nabeshin (a name blending of "nabe" in Watanabe and "shin" in Shinichi) came to him from God.

About his unique appearance (dressing similar to the character Lupin III) Watanabe said he grew out his afro and started wearing bright clothing in order to stand out and get attention.

== Works ==
=== Directorial works ===
- Fair, then Partly Piggy (1997)
- Gravitation: Lyrics of Love (1999)
- Lupin III: Da Capo of Love: Fujiko's Unlucky Days (1999) - Storyboard
- Excel Saga (1999) - Storyboard & episode director (ep 20, 26), storyboard (OP, ep 1, 4, 9, 13, 18, 25)
- Dotto! Koni-chan (2000) (ep 1–13) - Storyboard (ep 1, 2A, 4B, 6, 7A, 8C)
- Puni Puni Poemy (2001)
- éX-Driver: Danger Zone (2002)
- Tenchi Muyo! GXP (2002) - Storyboard (ED, ep 1, 3, 6, 8, 14, 18, 25, 26)
- Nerima Daikon Brothers (2006) - Storyboard & episode director (ep 12), storyboard (ED, ep 1–5, 8, 10, 11)
- The Wallflower (2006) - Storyboard & episode director (ep 25), storyboard (OP, ep 1–3, 9, 15, 20)
- Monster High: Kowa Ike Girls (2014)
- To Be Hero (2016) – Supervisor

=== Episode directing and storyboards ===
- Mister Ajikko (1987–1989) - Production assistant, episode director (ep 56, 61, 66, 72, 77, 84, 89, 94)
- Jungle King Tar-chan (1993–1994) - Storyboard (ep 12, 19)
- Akazukin Chacha (1994–1995) - Storyboard (ep 13)
- Brave Police J-Decker (1994–1995) - Storyboard & episode director (ep 3, 6, 12, 18, 22, 28, 33, 38, 44)
- Mahōjin Guru Guru (1994–1995) - Storyboard & episode director (ep 2, 7, 12), storyboard (ep 30, 36, 43)
- Virtua Fighter (1995–1996) - Storyboard & episode director (ep 5)
- Bonobono (1995–1996) - Storyboard & episode director (ep 3, 6, 13, 21, 27, 31, 40, 44)
- The Brave of Gold Goldran (1995–1996) - Storyboard & episode director (ep 2, 7, 12, 17, 22, 27, 33, 37, 43)
- Soar High! Isami (1995–1996) - Storyboard & episode director (ep 20, 26), storyboard (ep 47)
- Meiken Lassie (1996) - Storyboard (ep 5)
- Kochira Katsushika-ku Kamearikouen-mae Hashutsujo (1996–2004)
- Ganbarist! Shun (1996–1997) - Storyboard & episode director (ep 4, 9, 19), storyboard (ep 14, 28)
- Kiteretsu Daihyakka (1996) - Storyboard (ep 324)
- Nintama Rantarō (season four) (1996) - Storyboard (ep 26–28)
- Kodocha (1996–1998) - Storyboard & episode director (ep 13, 27, 30, 38, 44, 50, 57), storyboard (ep 7, 10, 14, 22, 39A)
- Kochira Katsushika-ku Kameari Kōen-mae Hashutsujo (1996–2004) - Storyboard & episode director (ep 4), storyboard (ep 10)
- Grander Musashi (1997) - Storyboard (ep 9)
- The King of Braves GaoGaiGar (1997–1998) - Storyboard (ep 23)
- Ojarumaru (season one) (1998–1999) - Storyboard (ep 25)
- Steam Detectives (1998–1999) - Storyboard (ep 21)
- Betterman (1998) - Storyboard (ep 10)
- Brigadoon: Marin & Melan (2000–2001) - Storyboard (ep 3, 9)
- Samurai Girl: Real Bout High School (2001) - Storyboard (ep 5, 7, 9)
- Crush Gear Turbo (2001–2003) - Storyboard & episode director (ep 58, 64)
- Mahoromatic: Automatic Maiden (2002–2003) - Storyboard & episode director (ep 9), storyboard (ep 6), episode director (ep 13)
- Godannar (2003–2004) - Storyboard (ep 9)
- Crush Gear Nitro (2003–2004) - Storyboard & episode director (2, 7, 14, 21, 24, 26, 31, 36, 38, 43, 46, 49), episode director (ep 9)
- Burn-Up Scramble (2004) - ED storyboard
- Uta Kata (2004) - Episode director (ep 4)
- To Heart -Remember my Memories- (2004) - Storyboard (ep 2, 10)
- Agatha Christie's Great Detectives Poirot and Marple (2004–2005) - Episode director (ep 5)
- Eyeshield 21 (2005–2008) - Storyboard & episode director (ep 16), storyboard (ep 22), episode director (ep 9)
- Bleach (2005) - Storyboard (ep 50)
- Mushiuta (2007) - Storyboard (ep 11)
- Kimi ga Aruji de Shitsuji ga Ore de (2008) - Storyboard & episode director (ep 2), storyboard (ep 6)
- Hayate no Gotoku! (2007–2008) - Storyboard & episode director (ep 32, 40, 46), storyboard (ep 35, 43, 50), episode director (ep 22, 52)
- Psychic Squad (2008–2009) - Storyboard & episode director (ep 6, 10, 21, 30, 49), storyboard (ep 18, 29, 35, 41, 46)
- Metal Fight Beyblade (2009–2010) - Storyboard (ep 4, 7, 15, 19, 21, 25, 28, 50)
- Nyan Koi! (2009) - Storyboard & episode director (ep 7)
- Baka and Test (2010) - Storyboard & episode director (ep 3, 10, 12), storyboard (ep 5)
- Sket Dance (2011–2012) - Storyboard & episode director (ep 8, 13, 43), storyboard (ep 5, 11, 12, 20, 30, 32, 38, 39, 54, 61, 67, 69)
- Baka to Test to Shōkanjū: Ni! (2011) - Storyboard & episode director (ep 3, 12), storyboard (ep 5, 10)
- C3 (2011) - Storyboard & episode director (ep 4), storyboard (ep 9)
- Pretty Rhythm: Dear My Future (2012) - Storyboard (ep 2, 6, 10, 11, 16, 19, 21, 22, 30, 33, 34, 37–39, 42, 44, 45, 48–51)
- Little Battlers eXperience (2012) - Storyboard (ep 19)
- Tasogare Otome × Amnesia (2012) - Storyboard (ep 5)
- OniAi (2012) - Storyboard (ep 5, 11)
- Da Capo III (2013) - Storyboard (ep 9)
- No-Rin (2014) - Storyboard (ep 2, 5, 9, 10)
- PriPara (2014–2017) - Storyboard (ep 7, 10, 14, 17, 22, 27, 32, 35, 41, 45, 49, 50, 52, 58)
- Girl Friend Beta (2014) - Storyboard (ep 7)
- Unlimited Fafnir (2015) - Storyboard (ep 9), episode director (ep 10)
- Jewelpet: Magical Change (2015) - Storyboard (ep 20, 22, 25, 27, 30, 35, 36)
- Nurse Witch Komugi R (2016) - Storyboard (ep 4, 8)
- Time Bokan 24 (2016–2017) - Storyboard (ep 2, 4, 9, 18, 22)
- Rilu Rilu Fairilu ~Maho no Kagami~ (2017–2018) - Storyboard (ep 1, 4, 6, 8, 10, 13, 16, 19, 21, 23, 27, 29, 31, 35, 37, 39, 42, 45–49)
- A Sister's All You Need (2017) - Storyboard (ep 4, 9, 10, 11)
- Time Bokan 24: The Villains' Strike Back (2017–2018) - Storyboard (ep 6, 11, 19, 20)
- How to Keep a Mummy (2018) - Storyboard (OP, ep 10)
- Midnight Crazy Trail (2018) - Storyboard
- Mr. Tonegawa: Middle Management Blues (2018) - Storyboard (ep 2, 11–13, 19, 23)
- Merc Storia: The Apathetic Boy and the Girl in a Bottle (2018) - Storyboard (ep 9)
- Wise Man's Grandchild (2019) - Storyboard (ep 6)
- 16bit Sensation: Another Layer (2023) - Storyboard (ep 3, 4)
- KonoSuba: An Explosion on This Wonderful World! (2023) - Storyboard (ep 6)
- Tearmoon Empire (2023) - Storyboard (ep 6)
- Train to the End of the World (2024) - Storyboard (ep 10)
- Puniru Is a Cute Slime (2024) - Storyboard (ep 3, 6)
- Medalist (2025) - Storyboard (ep 3, 4, 10, 13)
- Sorairo Utility (2025) - Storyboard (ep 8)
- I'm Living with an Otaku NEET Kunoichi!? (2025) - Storyboard (ep 21, 23, 24)
- Go for It, Nakamura! (2026) - Storyboard (ep 7)
