= Kōshi Rikudō =

Japanese manga artist

Kōshi Rikudō 六道 神士
- Self-portrait
- Born: November 16, 1970 (age 56) Dazaifu, Fukuoka, Japan
- Area: Manga artist
- Notable works: Excel Saga; Pandora in the Crimson Shell: Ghost Urn

Kōshi Rikudō (六道 神士, Rikudō Kōshi; born November 16, 1970) is a Japanese manga artist. Rikudō is a graduate of Kyushu Sangyo University and lives in Dazaifu, Fukuoka. His most popular work is Excel Saga, a manga which he describes as a work dealing with the everyday aspects of living in Japan. Another popular work is Pandora in the Crimson Shell: Ghost Urn. The anime version of Excel Saga contains stories from the first five volumes of the manga, and even features Rikdo as a character (voiced by Wataru Takagi).

== History ==
Rikudō started out by drawing adult doujinshi in 1990 under the circle name Genkotsuten, and Gebokudou. He also supervises the Rikudoukan circle, that was recently renamed Rikudou Juku. His most popular work, Excel Saga, was based on a doujinshi that he drew for comic market called Municipal Force Daitenzin, in 1994. To this day Rikudō continues to participate in doujinshi works from time to time. In 1996 he made his major debut with Excel Saga, which was published by Young King OURs, and lasted for 27 volumes, ending in 2011.

== Works ==
Title	Year	Notes	Refs
Municipal Force Daitenzin (市立戦隊ダイテンジン, Shiritsu Sentai Daitenjin)		Dojinshi, predecessor to Excel Saga, 1 volume	
Holy Brownie	1996–2010	Serialized in Young King OURs, 6 volumes	
Excel Saga	1996–2011	Serialized in Young King OURs, 27 volumes	
Arabaki (荒吐)	2000–01	Serialized in Ultra Jump, 2 volumes	
Moebius Gear (メビウスギア, Mebiusugia); Illustrations. Original story by Toshiki Inoue	2007–09	Serialized in Ultra Jump, 4 volumes	
Accomplice (アカンプリス, Akanpurisu)	2009–11	n/a, 1 volume	
Change H (ェンジH)	2009–13	n/a, 9 volumes, one of contributors to the anthology	
Neon Genesis Evangelion: Comic Tribute (新世紀エヴァンゲリオン コミックトリビュート)	2010	n/a, 1 volume, one of contributors to the anthology	
Deathless (デスレス, Desuresu)	2010–16	Serialized in Young King OURs GH, 12 volumes	
Echo/Zeon (エコー/ゼオン, Ekō/Zeon)	2010–11	Serialized in Young Ace, 3 volumes	
Sarakiel (サラカエル, Sarakaeru)	2011–13	Serialized in Dengeki Maoh, 3 volumes	
Ageha (AGEHA -アゲハ-)	2012–13	Serialized in Young King OURs, 2 volumes	
Pandora in the Crimson Shell: Ghost Urn (紅殻のパンドラ, Koukaku no Pandora); Concept by Masamune Shirow	2012–24	Serialized in Newtype Ace and Niconico Ace, 26 volumes	
Simple Kiss (カンタンキス, Kantan Kisu)	2013–14	Serialized in Young Comic, 2 volumes	
Super Cartesian Theater (スーパー・カルテジアン・シアター)	2016–18	Serialized in Young King OURs, 5 volumes	

== Assistants ==
- Shōji Satō
- Ikami Hajime
- Rin Hitotose
