= Excel Saga =

Japanese manga series and its adaptations

- First tankōbon volume cover, featuring Excel (center) and Lord Il Palazzo (left)

エクセル♥サーガ (Ekuseru Sāga)
- Genre: Parody; Science fiction comedy; Surreal comedy
- Manga
- Written by: Kōshi Rikudō
- Published by: Shōnen Gahosha
- English publisher: NA: Viz Media
- Imprint: Young King Comics
- Magazine: Young King OURs
- Original run: 1996 – 2011
- Volumes: 27
- Anime television series
- Directed by: Shinichi Watanabe
- Produced by: Shigeru Kitayama; Michihisa Abe; Yuji Matsukura
- Written by: Jigoku Gumi (Note: A penname used by writers Yōsuke Kuroda and Hideyuki Kurata in collaboration.)
- Music by: Toshio Masuda
- Studio: J.C.Staff
- Licensed by: AU: Madman Entertainment; NA: Funimation Entertainment; UK: ADV Films
- Original network: TV Tokyo
- English network: UK: Sci-Fi Channel, Rapture TV, Channel 4, S4C; US: Anime Network
- Original run: October 8, 1999 – March 31, 2000
- Episodes: 26
- icon

Excel Saga (Japanese: エクセル♥サーガ, Hepburn: Ekuseru Sāga) is a Japanese manga series written and illustrated by Kōshi Rikudō. It was serialized in Shōnen Gahōsha's seinen manga magazine Young King OURs from 1996 to 2011, and its individual chapters were collected and published in 27 tankōbon volumes . The series follows the attempts of Across, a "secret ideological organization", to conquer the city of Fukuoka as a first step towards world domination. The title character of the series, Excel, is a key member of the group who is working towards completing this goal, while the city is being defended by a shadowy government agency led by Dr. Kabapu.

The manga was adapted into an anime television series by Victor Entertainment. Directed by Shinichi Watanabe and animated by J.C.Staff, the series was broadcast on TV Tokyo from October 1999 to March 2000. TV Tokyo aired 25 of its 26 episodes. The finale was deemed too violent, obscene, and lengthy for broadcast on Japanese television and was only included in DVD release of the series.

== Plot ==
Believing the World to be corrupt, the secret organization Across plans to conquer the world. The first step in the plan for world domination is to begin by focusing on one city in order to minimize setbacks. Across consists of the leader of the organization, Il Palazzo, and his young adult officers: the enthusiastic and energetically devoted Excel and the soft-spoken Hyatt, who is prone to fainting and losing lots of blood at a time. Excel and Hyatt live in an apartment building in the city, along with their pet dog Menchi, who they have deemed their emergency food supply. Excel and Hyatt are later joined by a snobbish but equally clueless rival officer of Across named Elgala.

Living in the neighboring apartment are three guys: Iwata, Sumiyoshi and Watanabe, who along with apartment neighbor and co-worker Matsuya, work for the Department of City Security. The Department's leader, Dr. Kabapu, also has a grandiose plan on stopping Across; he has the City Security workers dress in Super Sentai-like uniforms and sends them on different missions. Supporting Kabapu is an inventor Gojo Shiouji who likes little girls, and his gynoid Ropponmatsu, who later is deployed as two models.

The series follows the daily interactions among the two groups. Il Palazzo would send the girls on their missions but the results are usually a failure with some explosive or catastrophic damage to the city. Kabapu would send the City Security workers on some equally ridiculous assignment which would also go wrong. Eventually Il Palazzo and Kabapu become aware of each other's manipulations and escalate their plans. Excel finds herself being replaced by an impersonator who heads the ILL Corporation. Massive amounts of money is spent on elections and politics. Eventually the members of Across begin making appeals directly to the City's citizens before Il Palazzo publicly declares the existence of Across and its intentions to the public. Hyatt is captured and Excel and Elgala are later held in an immigrant detention center before being rescued by Il Palazzo, who begins the new phase of his plans.

The anime adaptation introduces some original characters: immigrant worker turned wandering spirit Pedro; alien mascot-like creatures called Puchuu; and The Great Will of the Macrocosm, the last of whom occasionally resets the storyline. The anime director Shinichi Watanabe cameos as an afro-wearing guy named Nabeshin, and a caricature of the manga artist also makes appearances.

== Production ==
The series was created by Kōshi Rikudō and based on a doujinshi he had previously created while in high school named Municipal Force Daitenzin (市立戦隊ダイテンジン, Shiritsu Sentai Daitenjin). Excel Saga was created as an evolution of Daitenzin in order to develop the character of Excel, as well as to laugh off the vision of a depressed and pessimistic view of the world. Excel Saga is set in Fukuoka City and the names of characters and organizations are derived from local locations and buildings.

Victor Entertainment contacted Shōnen Gahōsha about adapting Excel Saga into an anime, and the two companies approached Rikudō. Shinichi Watanabe was chosen as director. Watanabe added his own alter ego, Nabeshin, and expanded several elements. He says that the Great Will in the manga was "conveyed just as words", and he himself developed its appearance, eventually settling on the "swirling, talking cosmos". He also increased Pedro's role in the story from a single frame in the manga. Watanabe says he was pleased with that aspect of his work, noting that "Pedro's situation was considered unsuitable for broadcast in Japan". The anime production staff was given the freedom to do anything they wanted as long as they kept the theme of the series intact, and Rikudō requested they created a separate timeline; this departure from the original work was acknowledged in-story, with each episode opening with a caricature of Rikudō giving "Nabeshin" permission to diverge from the source material, hence the anime's "Quack Experimental" tagline. Rikudō would later become influenced by the anime series due to its quick broadcast in comparison to the monthly schedule of the manga. The anime makes frequent use of parody and in-jokes as comedic devices, with each episode having a genre-based theme. This extends to the animation, with several characters designed in the style of other works, such as those by Leiji Matsumoto. Kotono Mitsuishi was chosen to play the role of Excel, and Watanabe was impressed with Mitsuishi's rapid delivery of her lines, saying that "she really pushed herself to the limit and beyond". He also says, "at times she was too fast, and there was plenty of time left to match the lip-synch". In such cases, either he would add new material or Mitsuishi would ad-lib. At first Rikudō felt stunned and uncomfortable at hearing Excel speak, but he called the casting "amazing" and was pleased to hear his favourite voice actors read lines from his work.

== Media ==
=== Manga ===
Written and illustrated by Kōshi Rikudō, Excel Saga started in Shōnen Gahōsha's seinen manga magazine Young King OURs in 1996 and finished in August 2011. Its 183 individual chapters were collected by Shōnen Gahōsha in 27 tankōbon volumes, released from April 23, 1997, to October 29, 2011. A 60-page one-shot was published in Young King OURs on December 28, 2021, to celebrate the series' 25th anniversary.

Viz Media licensed Excel Saga for an English release in North America and the first volume was released on August 13, 2003. Initially the series was published on an approximately bimonthly schedule, however the series had caught up with the Japanese release and the publishing schedule for volume 12 onwards was changed as a result. Volume 27 was released on January 14, 2014. The Viz edition includes a section called Oubliette, which consists of a sound effects guide and production and cultural notes.

=== Anime ===
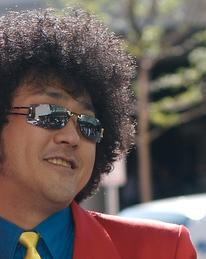
Shinichi Watanabe dressed in the style of his 'Nabeshin' character

An anime television series adaption was produced by J.C.Staff and directed by Shinichi Watanabe. Taglined Quack Experimental Animation (へっぽこ実験アニメーション, Heppoko Jikken Animēshon), the series was broadcast for 25 episodes on TV Tokyo from October 8, 1999, to March 31, 2000. At the publisher's request, the anime series follows a different storyline from the manga; however, Rikudō was pleased with the adaptation. Victor Entertainment produced the music of the series, which was composed and arranged by Toshio Masuda and directed by Keiichi Nozaki. Director Shinichi Watanabe wrote the lyrics for the opening and closing themes. The opening and ending themes were performed by Yumiko Kobayashi and Mikako Takahashi, credited as The Excel Girls. The lyrics for the opening theme, "Ai (Chūseishin)" (愛 (忠誠心); lit. 'Love (Loyalty)'), were written "on the train, five minutes before the deadline". The ending theme song is "Menchi no Aishū no Borero" (メンチの哀愁のボレロ; lit. 'Menchi's Bolero of Sorrow'). A 26th episode, "Going Too Far", was deliberately created to be too violent and obscene for broadcast in Japan and was instead included as a DVD bonus. Watanabe commented that it "felt good to go past the limits of a TV series", although he added that it was "not something that you should do too often". The 26 episodes were released in 13 DVD sets from March 1, 2000, to February 21, 2001.

The series was licensed for an English language release in North America and the United Kingdom by ADV Films and in Australia and New Zealand by Madman Entertainment. The English adaptation initially starred Jessica Calvello, with Larissa Wolcott taking over the role after episode thirteen after Calvello had damaged her voice during production. In North America, ADV released the series on six DVDs between June 11, 2002, and April 8, 2003. The complete series was released on July 6, 2004, as Excel Saga: Imperfect Collection, and was re-released with different packaging on August 1, 2006, as Excel Saga: Complete Collection. In the UK, the series was first released between May 19, 2003, and March 15, 2004. A complete box set was later released as Excel Saga – Complete Box Set on July 2, 2007. The series was broadcast on UK TV channel Rapture TV from January 2, 2007.

On October 30, 2010, Excel Saga was re-licensed in North America by Funimation, who re-released the complete series to DVD on May 17, 2011.

=== Soundtracks ===
Several albums were released featuring music from the anime series. (Excel Saga: Original Soundtrack Experiment 1 (エクセル・サーガ ― 大いなるサウンドトラック実験1)) was released on January 1, 2000. The album was later released in North America on September 6, 2005. This was followed in Japan by (Excel Saga: Original Soundtrack Experiment 2 (エクセル・サーガ ― 大いなるサウンドトラック実験2 おまけ 寸止め海峡)) on March 23, 2000. A North American release followed on November 1, 2005.

== Reception ==
Since its August 2003 release in North America, the manga has been among the 50 top-selling graphic novels on three occasions.

The English-language reviews of the Excel Saga anime were broadly positive and enthusiastic. Mike Crandol of Anime News Network puts it in the same class as Airplane!, National Lampoon, Tex Avery, and Monty Python, adding that the "combination of character-based humor, outrageous slapstick farce, and a plot that is engaging if only for how weird it is make for a thoroughly enjoyable comedic experience". A contrary opinion is expressed by Joel Pearce from DVD Verdict, who says the series is "occasionally clever and funny," but that "much of it is gratingly obnoxious". Many reviewers express displeasure with middle and later episodes, saying they were "more of the same," that they had stale humor, that they were tiresome, or even painfully unfunny. Episodes fourteen through sixteen, starring the Ropponmatsus, bear the brunt of this criticism, but several reviewers consider episode seventeen, Animation USA, to be one of the best.

Reviewers also agree that the series suffers from too much filler in its later episodes, with Crandol describing the show as spinning its wheels. Yegulalp reserves his harshest words for the unaired Going Too Far, calling it "pure, idiotic, wretched excess." He goes on to say that the episode has "the feeling of trying to deliberately enrage the audience by resorting to the only tactics left: genuinely offensive subject matter." Joel Cunningham at Digitally Obsessed disagrees, saying that the episode succeeds just in time, "with one of the series' funnier sight gags".

The series generally receives high marks for technical aspects. Cunningham feels the animation is flat-out gorgeous, but Crandol considers it merely above average. In the latter's opinion, its quality wanes as the series progresses and increasingly relies on super-deforming the characters for comedic effect. ADV's release earned praise for the quality of the video transfer and the DVD extras (particularly the Vid-Notes). Reviewers especially appreciated the English voice acting: Crandol calls it brilliant, and several note that Calvello and Wolcott were each able to capture Mitsuishi's Excel. Pearce, in contrast, found the English cast to be pretty bad and its Excel to be "dental drill shrill".

Akadot's reviewer of the manga writes that "some of the strange events go on a little too long and do not have the impact that they do animated," but that Rikudō's Excel Saga is "graced with fantastic visuals and a hilarious story," and that the English edition is "a masterpiece of the translator's skill." Barb Lien-Cooper from Comic World News concurs that the manga cannot keep pace with the anime, but she finds Excel herself to be wittier in the manga and that the manga's plots make more sense than the anime's. A reviewer of the French edition also praises Rikudō's work, noting that it is an "...easy read without problems of clarity".
