= Twisted Christmas =

Studio album by Bob Rivers
- Released: 1988
- Recorded: 1987
- Studios: Longview Farm studio, North Brookfield, Massachusetts
- Genres: Comedy rock Christmas music
- Label: Critique/Atco/Atlantic

Bob Rivers chronology
Twisted Christmas (1988)	I Am Santa Claus (1993)

Twisted Christmas is a 1988 Christmas parody album recorded by Bob Rivers and his Comedy Corp. It is the first in a line of Christmas-themed parody albums from Rivers, with later entries including I Am Santa Claus, More Twisted Christmas, Chipmunks Roasting on an Open Fire, and White Trash Christmas.

It was rated four stars by AllMusic.

== Track listing ==
1. The Twelve Pains of Christmas (3:36)
  - Parody of "The Twelve Days of Christmas". Sung as a normal Christmas carol, with each verse comedically recited by a participant in a painful activity.
2. The Chimney Song (2:06)
  - Original song, sung by a little girl. The song describes the ensuing months after Santa Claus gets stuck in someone's chimney.
3. We Wish You Weren't Living With Us (0:44)
  - Parody of "We Wish You a Merry Christmas". Sung as a normal Christmas carol. About relatives who overstay their visit, becoming a nuisance to the host.
4. Wreck the Malls (2:02)
  - Parody of "Deck the Halls" performed in the style of Joan Jett and the Blackhearts. The song is about excessive Christmas shopping.
5. A Visit from St. Nicholson (4:30)
  - Parody of "A Visit from St. Nicholas" by Clement Clark Moore, with Bob Rivers impersonating actor Jack Nicholson (satirizing his frequent appearances at Los Angeles Lakers games and his movie roles portraying disturbed maniacs) appearing instead of St. Nicholas. Spoken-word piece with no music.
6. O Come All Ye Grateful Dead-Heads (1:23)
  - Parody of "O Come All Ye Faithful" describing the Deadheads phenomenon. Sung as a normal Christmas carol.
7. I'm Dressin' Up Like Santa (When I Get Out on Parole) (3:06)
  - Loose parody of "It's Beginning to Look a Lot Like Christmas," performed in the western swing genre, by a criminal thief whose 15-year prison sentence is ending immediately before Christmas and he makes his plans for the holiday.
8. The Restroom Door Said, "Gentlemen" (1:33)
  - Parody of "God Rest You Merry, Gentlemen." Sung by an all-male a cappella chorus. The subject has apparently been subjected to a prank in which someone flipped the Men's and Ladies signs to the restroom.
9. Foreigners (2:07)
  - Parody of "Angels We Have Heard on High" in which Russian, Mexican and Italian immigrants describe their experiences in the United States.
10. Joy to the World (1:22)
  - Hard rock instrumental version of traditional song.
11. A Message from the King (2:18)
  - Spoken word piece by a gluttonous Elvis impersonator, purporting to be speaking from "Rock and Roll Heaven." Performed over an instrumental of "Silent Night."

== See also ==
- Rated X Mas
