= Galaxy Express 999 (film) =

- Theatrical release poster
- Directed by: Rintaro
- Screenplay by: Fumio Ishimori
- Based on: Galaxy Express 999 by Leiji Matsumoto
- Produced by: Chiaki Imada
- Starring: Masako Nozawa; Masako Ikeda; Kaneta Kimotsuki
- Cinematography: Masatoshi Fukui; Toshio Katayama
- Music by: Nozomu Aoki
- Production company: Toei Animation
- Distributed by: Toei Company
- Release date: August 4, 1979 (Japan)
- Running time: 129 minutes
- Country: Japan
- Language: Japanese
- Box office: ¥4.2 billion (est.)

Galaxy Express 999 (銀河鉄道999, Ginga Tetsudō 999) is a 1979 Japanese animated science fiction film directed by Rintaro, based on the manga and anime television series of the same name originally created by Leiji Matsumoto.

== Plot ==
12-year old Tetsuro Hoshino lives in the slums of Megalopolis City. He wishes to ride on the Galaxy Express 999, where rumors suggest anyone who rides to the end of the line can get a free mechanized robotic body. One night, he attempts to swipe a train pass, but is apprehended by the police, and drops a locket. Before fleeing the scene, Tetsuro meets a mysterious woman who bears a striking resemblance to his late mother. He later sees the woman on a balcony and faints trying to reach her. She saves him from the police and uses a device to look into his dreams, where she watches a young Tetsuro lose his mother to the villainous Count Mecha, who hunts humans for trophies.

Tetsuro learns the woman's name is Maetel, and explains to her that he wants a mechanical body so he can kill Count Mecha in revenge. Maetel gives Tetsuro back the locket, which contains a picture of his mother, and offers him a ticket for the 999 under the condition that they travel together. They go to Megalopolis Station, where the train departs Earth for its journey to the Andromeda Galaxy. The train makes its first stop on Saturn's moon Titan, which has been terraformed to have a hospitable atmosphere. Upon arrival, Maetel is kidnapped by a group of bandits, and Tetsuro gets knocked out. Tetsuro wakes up in an elderly woman's house and discovers that Titan is governed under "paradise law", meaning it is a lawless community. The woman advises Tetsuro against rescuing Maetel, but gives Tetsuro a hat and poncho, as well as a gun for self-defense, all of which belonged to her son, Tochiro Ōyama.

Tetsuro later meets Antares, the leader of the Grape Valley Bandits. Antares tells Tetsuro that the gun he carries, the Warrior's Weapon, is highly effective against mechanized people. After discerning that Tetsuro and Maetel are not mechanized, Antares shows them the unexploded bullets still inside his body, and the group of children he cares for, all orphaned by Count Mecha. Antares tells Tetsuro that the space pirate Emeraldas may know where Count Mecha's hideout, the Time Castle, is currently located. He lets them go free, and Tetsuro thanks the old woman, who allows him to keep Tochiro's clothes and gun.

The 999 next arrives on Pluto, a planet where the bodies of people who died or gave up their humanity for machine bodies are stored in solid ice. Tetsuro encounters a faceless machine woman named Shadow, who attempts to kidnap and freeze him to death so she won't be lonely. After departing Pluto, Tetsuro and Maetel make the acquaintance of a young waitress named Claire, who has a machine body made of crystal glass. Claire explains that she obtained her glass body at the behest of her mother, but hopes to buy back her old body from Pluto.

When Emeraldas' spaceship, the Queen Emeraldas, passes by the train, Tetsuro attempts to get her attention by firing his gun at the ship. Emeraldas boards the train and holds Tetsuro at gunpoint before seeing Tochiro's gun in his possession, and ultimately relents when Maetel appears with Tochiro's hat. Tetsuro learns that Maetel and Emeraldas know each other, and that Emeraldas and Tochiro are lovers. The space pirate reluctantly informs Tetsuro that the Time Castle will appear next near Trader's Fork, a waystation on the arid planet Heavy Melder, the train's next stop.

At Trader's Fork, a bartender tells Tetsuro to venture out to a ship near Mt. Gun Frontier, where an eccentric who knows the answer lives. Tetsuro meets a dying Tochiro, who informs Tetsuro that the Time Castle will next appear on the other side of Mt. Gun Frontier. He enlists Tetsuro to help him activate a machine which vaporizes Tochiro's body and transfers his consciousness into the supercomputer of his best friend Captain Harlock's ship, the Arcadia. While heading back from Trader's Fork, Tetsuro is assaulted by thugs from the saloon working for Count Mecha, who steal Tetsuro's gun and leave him for dead. Tetsuro returns to the saloon to reclaim his gun, where Harlock saves him from the thugs. Harlock tells Tetsuro that he saved him in return for what he did for Tochiro. They meet up with Maetel and Emeraldas, the latter of whom leaves the scene in silence after Harlock informs her that Tochiro has died.

In the Time Castle, Tetsuro discovers the taxidermied remains of his mother mounted on a fireplace. He encounters Count Mecha, who was alerted to Tetsuro's arrival by Ryuzu, his lover. Antares arrives at the scene, buying Tetsuro enough time to chase Count Mecha to the Time Castle's central computer chamber. Tetsuro is able to shoot off one of Count Mecha's arms, before the latter calls down a glass capsule to try and safely move the Time Castle forward through time and escape. Antares enters the chamber and gets shot by Count Mecha, causing the bullets inside Antares' body to explode, which shatters the capsule. Before Antares dies, he warns Tetsuro not to trust Maetel. Tetsuro shoots Count Mecha in the head as Tochiro told him to, killing him. Ryuzu reveals that Tetsuro reminded her of what it was like to be human, and because of this, she refused to advance time earlier. Tetsuro then flees the Time Castle as it crumbles into dust and Ryuzu dies, her body rusting away. Tetsuro tells Harlock and Maetel that he no longer wants a mechanized body, and that his revenge will not be complete until he stops mechanization once and for all.

Tetsuro and Maetel barely make it back to the station before the train departs for its final stop, Planet Maetel. Tetsuro learns that the free mechanical body offered there is that of a mechanized component of the planet itself, and that Maetel brought him there to undergo the process. Feeling betrayed, Tetsuro angrily slaps Maetel, but is then incapacitated by guards who take him below the planet to be mechanized in the presence of Maetel's mother and ruler of Andromeda, Queen Promethium. Maetel, desperate to save her young companion, plans to destroy the planet with her pendant, which contains the consciousness of her father and Promethium's husband Dr. Pan. Dr. Pan's voice explains that the pendant contains enough energy to disrupt the planet's mechanized counterparts, all of whom were transformed willingly in the hopes of someday destroying Promethium's empire. Though Maetel initially hesitates to do so, Tetsuro takes the pendant and launches it to the core of Andromeda, setting off its self-destruction. Meanwhile, the Arcadia and Queen Emeraldas fight back against the forces of Andromeda, as both Harlock and Emeraldas intend to ensure Tetsuro's survival. Maetel and Tetsuro barely escape with their lives aboard the 999, as Maetel explains her body is an organic copy of his mother's, and that she travels through time through cloning. Suddenly, the enraged Promethium appears and tries to strangle the life out of Tetsuro, but is interrupted by Claire, who grabs hold of the queen and self-destructs to save Tetsuro, seemingly killing Promethium.

The 999 returns to Earth, where Maetel tells Tetsuro that she will return to Pluto to be reunited with her original body and tells him that when next they meet, he may not recognize her. Tetsuro watches sadly as the 999 then departs from Earth once again with Maetel in tow.

== Cast ==
Galaxy Express 999 (film) cast
Role	Japanese	English	
Role	Japanese	New World Pictures	Ocean Studios
Narrator	Tatsuya Jou		Don Brown
Tetsuro Hoshino	Masako Nozawa	Joey Hanakanabobakananda Smith	Saffron Henderson
Tetsuro Hoshino	Masako Nozawa	BJ Ward	Saffron Henderson
Maetel	Masako Ikeda	Fay McKay	Kathleen Barr
Claire	Youko Asagami	BJ Ward	Janyse Jaud
Tochiro's mother	Miyoko Asou		Daphne Goldrick
Shadow	Toshiko Fujita	BJ Ward	Jane Perry
Captain of the Guard	Michio Hazama		
Antares	Yasuo Hisamatsu	Olaf	Don Brown
Antares	Yasuo Hisamatsu	Tony Pope	Don Brown
Captain Harlock	Makio Ino'ue	Captain Warlock	Scott McNeil
Captain Harlock	Makio Ino'ue	Tony Pope	Scott McNeil
Queen Promethium	Ryouko Kinomiya	Fay McKay	Kathleen Barr
The Conductor	Kaneta Kimotsuki	Corey Burton	Terry Klassen
Dr. Pan	Gorou Naya	Tony Pope	Dr. Ban
Dr. Pan	Gorou Naya	Tony Pope	Gerard Plunkett
Crown	Noriko Ohara	Fay McKay	Ryuzu
Crown	Noriko Ohara	Fay McKay	Willow Johnson
Miime	Noriko Ohara		
Taver's master	Ryūji Saikachi		
A Machinery Earl	Hidekatsu Shibata	Booker Bradshaw	Count Mecha
A Machinery Earl	Hidekatsu Shibata	Booker Bradshaw	Paul Dobson
Queen Emeraldas	Reiko Tajima	BJ Ward	Nicole Oliver
Tochiro Ōyama	Kei Tomiyama	Corey Burton	John Payne
Tetsuro's mother	Akiko Tsuboi	Fay McKay	Kathleen Barr

== Production ==
In the spring of 1978, the anime version of Leiji Matsumoto's Space Pirate Captain Harlock debuted on television produced by Toei Pictures. The TV adaptation of Galaxy Express 999 had been planned to air in the fall of 1978 after Harlock's completion. On July 14, 1978, just three days after the 16th episode of Captain Harlock aired on TV, Farewell to Space Battleship Yamato arrived in theaters. This sequel had taken anime to even greater heights than its prior theatrical installment. Due to Leiji Matsumoto's success and popularity, plans for a film based on Galaxy Express 999 were moving forward.

Toei hadn't produced an animated hit for theaters since their 1971 feature Animal Treasure Island, and no extensive, original stories had been made since then. Even though at the time the majority of theatrical anime features like Space Battleship Yamato or Science Ninja Team Gatchaman consisted of collected or expanded TV episodes, an older range of high school viewers that had been attracted to these films were increasingly displeased with these slapped-together affairs. New stories were being called for and 999 was there at exactly the right time.

However, 999 was just starting its TV series run and the manga was nowhere close to finishing as it ran in Weekly Shōnen King until 1981. The ending of Maetel and Tetsuro's journey was a mystery, as well as the various other secrets that were hidden in the development of the story. Still, the film version was required to be self-contained, which would result in the manga and TV anime having all the mysteries spoiled ahead of their own conclusions. Leiji Matsumoto had even considered making the feature into two films, the first ending with Tetsuro returning to Earth after getting revenge, and the second film having an actual conclusion for the entirety to the series.

== Release ==
Galaxy Express 999 was released in Japan on August 4, 1979, where it was distributed by Toei Company. It was the highest grossing film of 1979 in Japan. The film was picked up for distribution in the United States by Roger Corman's New World Pictures in 1980 but was shelved until 1982 after test bookings. The film received theatrical distribution in the United States after the establishment of anime fandom in the West. The film premiered in America on August 8, 1981. The American version of the film was edited from the original 129 minute running time to 91 minutes and changed characters names such as Tetsuro Hoshino to Joey "Hana-cana-boba-camanda" Smith.

The film's second English-language adaptation was produced by Viz Media and released in 1996, including the uncut VHS. The DVD version of Galaxy Express 999 was released in the United States on June 28, 2011, by Discotek Media. It features the English subbed and dubbed (Viz dub) versions of the films.

== Box office ==
Galaxy Express 999 was 1979's highest-grossing domestic film in Japan, earning a distributor rental income of ¥1.65 billion, equivalent to estimated gross receipts of approximately ¥4.2 billion.

== Reception ==
At the third Japanese Academy Awards in 1980, Galaxy Express 999 won the Popularity award for film.

Variety referred to the film as an "attractive Japanese animated sci-fi feature", but noted that "working in a limited animation format, the chief drawback of which is limited movement [...], the film does boast beautifully-colored, elaborate designs. Once one gets used to the lack of fluid, full animation, the imaginative visuals are impressive" and that "pic deserves a second look".

The Encyclopedia of Science Fiction described the 1979 film Galaxy Express 999 as an enjoyable anime, praising its animation, which it considered impressive for its age, and its engaging pacing despite a running time exceeding two hours. It highlighted the film's exploration of immortality and its psychological consequences, particularly through the contrast between the protagonist's initial desire for a mechanical body and his eventual rejection of mechanization. However, the encyclopedia criticized the narrative's implausibilities, coincidences and reliance on good fortune, some of which it attributed to the compression of the original story. It also found the romantic relationships involving the twelve-year-old protagonist questionable, particularly his relationship with Maetel, who inhabits a body resembling that of his mother. The encyclopedia further criticized the heavily edited 1981 English-language release, which removed approximately 35 minutes of footage and altered character names.

== Sequel ==
The film was followed by Adieu Galaxy Express 999, which was released in 1981.

== See also ==
- List of Japanese films of 1979
- Gamera: Super Monster - a 1980 Japanese kaiju film involved stock footages of the 999 and Space Battleship Yamato, where both films involved the producer Masaya Tokuyama in productions.

== Footnotes ==
=== References ===
- Beck, Jerry (2005). The Animated Movie Guide. Chicago Review Press. ISBN 1569762228.
- Camp, Brian; Davis, Julie (2007). Anime Classics Zettai!: 100 Must-See Japanese Animation Masterpieces. Stone Bridge Press. ISBN 978-1933330228.
- Macias, Patrick (2003). Anime Poster Art: Japan's Movie House Masterpieces. DH Publishing Inc. ISBN 0972312447.
- Willis, Donald, ed. (1985). Variety's Complete Science Fiction Reviews. Garland Publishing Inc. ISBN 978-0-8240-6263-7.
