= More Twisted Christmas =

Studio album by Bob Rivers & Twisted Radio
- Released: 1997
- Genre: Christmas
- Label: Atlantic

Bob Rivers & Twisted Radio chronology
I Am Santa Claus (1993)	More Twisted Christmas (1997)	Chipmunks Roasting On an Open Fire (2000)

More Twisted Christmas (alternately titled "Bob Rivers Presents More Twisted Christmas") is the third Christmas album by Bob Rivers & Twisted Radio, released in 1997. Whereas the first two albums in the Twisted Christmas series featured some original songs, spoken word comedy and instrumentals, all of the songs on this album are direct parodies, either Christmas-themed parodies of popular songs or parodies of Christmas songs.

The album was in the top 20 of Billboard's Top Heatseekers album charts in December 1997.

== Track listing ==
1. "It's the Most Fattening Time of the Year" - 2:52
  - Parody of Andy Williams's "It's the Most Wonderful Time of the Year." Grant Goodeve provides lead vocals; Richard Simmons appears as himself.
2. "Toy Sack" - 2:33
  - Parody of The B-52's' "Love Shack"
3. "Police Stop My Car" - 1:58
  - Parody of José Feliciano's "Feliz Navidad," about driving under the influence
4. "Sled Zeppelin" - 2:38
  - Parody of Led Zeppelin's "D'yer Mak'er," in a medley with "Jingle Bells."
5. "Yellow Snow! Yellow Snow! Yellow Snow" - 2:29
  - Parody of "Let It Snow! Let It Snow! Let It Snow!" with lyrics describing an incontinent puppy
6. "Parking Spaces" - 1:36
  - Parody of "Good King Wenceslas," describing an unsuccessful search for a parking spot at a mall. At one point, the Americans with Disabilities Act is satired; the legally-mandated handicapped parking spot is mocked as a "specially anointed" status.
7. "There's a Santa Who Looks a Lot Like Elvis" - 2:41
  - Parody of Bing Crosby's "It's Beginning to Look a Lot Like Christmas," about an alleged sighting of Elvis Presley. Near the end, Buddy Holly is also sighted.
8. "Jesus's Birthday" - 2:32
  - Parody of The Beatles' "Birthday," with the singer expecting to receive "socks and some... real tight pants" at a Christmas party.
9. "All You Need Is Elves" - 2:57
  - Parody of The Beatles' "All You Need Is Love" as sung by elves.
10. Buttcracker Suite - 4:04 (selections from Tchaikovsky's The Nutcracker set to lyrics describing the intergluteal cleft):
  1. "Thong" (March of the Toy Soldiers)
  2. "Dance of the Repairman's Belt" (Dance of the Sugarplum Fairy)
  3. "Fix Those Wedgies" (Russian Dance; lead vocals by Richard Simmons in his second appearance)
  4. "Please Just Say No to Crack" (Waltz of the Flowers)
11. "Hey You! Get Off My House!" - 2:55
  - Parody of The Rolling Stones' "Get Off of My Cloud," performed in the style of late-era Frank Sinatra
12. "Holidaze (S'cuze Me, I've Got Gifts to Buy)" - 3:10
  - Parody of Jimi Hendrix's "Purple Haze"
13. "Rummy Rocker Boy" - 4:06
  - Parody of Bing Crosby and David Bowie's "Peace on Earth/Little Drummer Boy." The Crosby analog admits not being the long-deceased Crosby; Roach, an audibly drunk "death metal" singer who stands in Bowie's stead, refuses to believe him. The recording includes both the parody song and a spoken prologue between the two, parodying Bowie's appearance on Bing Crosby's Merrie Olde Christmas.
