= Kosovo (song) =

Song by Bob Rivers

"Kosovo" is a parody of the Beach Boys hit song "Kokomo". It was produced in 1999 by Seattle radio comedian/radio personality Bob Rivers. The song gained notoriety in 2005 after a music video that Norwegian soldiers filmed while serving as peacekeepers in Kosovo was posted online.

== Satirical lyrics ==
According to Rivers "the intent of the song was to mock my own country for its bullying ways around the world. The idea was to point out how casually the U.S. plays World Police. The song takes on the persona of the U.S. government, ridiculing the fact that we push others around without much concern."

We'll kick some ass,
and then we'll see how it goes,
and then we really don't know.
Good luck to Kosovo.

== Music video ==
In 2002, a group of Norwegian peacekeepers in Kosovo (calling themselves the "Shiptare Boys") parodied the music video for "Kokomo," using Rivers' song with their own hand-held video camera footage. In the parody, the soldiers imitate dance moves and scenes from the original music video in desolate war-torn areas around Kosovo. It was widely broadcast in the Balkans, prompting the Norwegian ambassador to formally apologize.

Nicholas Wood of The New York Times wrote,

The trouble started, Mr. Rivers said, when a group of Norwegian soldiers on peacekeeping duty in Kosovo came upon the song in 2002 and decided to make a rock video of it.

The two-and-half-minute video shows four soldiers miming to the music -- dancing on watchtowers and armored trucks, wearing bulletproof vests over their bare chests, performing routines in their military compound and even splashing mineral water on one another.

Over time, the tape (which has a link on Mr. Rivers's Web site, www.bobrivers.com) made its way to the Internet and caught the attention of BK TV, the Serbian television station. When the station broadcast the video, it incited an uproar, and not only because of the dancing and lightly clad soldiers. What was most provocative were the song's lyrics. Verses such as "Protecting human rights, airstrikes and fire-fights / We'll be dropping our bombs wherever Serbian bad guys hide," caused deep offense...

Rivers stated about the music video, "The song has been stolen...and I wish there were a way to stop it." in 2009, the group Wartist (named for a Group connecting War and the Arts) summarized the affair, writing:

10 Years ago, on 24 March 1999, Operation Allied Force had been started, commonly known as the Kosovo War. The satirical version of a Beach Boys song from the USA was used in 2002 by some Norwegian peacekeepers to make a music video, leading to diplomatic disturbance some years later. The result is still amusing – not the least because of the timeless and transferable text.

The last few seconds of the hand-made video show one of the soldiers being hit by a car, but that has been edited out of many of the video postings. Also, when subtitles were put on the song in Serbia, they mistakenly replaced "Milošević" with the name of a 14th-century Serb hero, Miloš Obilić. The soldiers, the "Shiptare Boys," also known as the "Shqiptare [Albanian] Boys," had all left the Norwegian Army by the time the investigation took place, so no further action was taken.
