= 1997 in South Korean music =

The following is a list of notable events and releases that happened in 1997 in music in South Korea.

== Debuting and disbanded in 1997 ==
=== Debuting ===
- Baby Vox
- Delispice
- Diva
- Jaurim
- Jinusean
- No Brain
- NRG
- Sechs Kies
- S.E.S.
- U-BeS
- Uptown
- Yurisangja
- YB

=== Solo debuts ===
- Kim Hyun-jung
- Kim Ji-hoon
- Kim Ji-hyun
- Haha
- Hong Kyung-min
- Park Ji-yoon
- Pearl
- Yoo Seung-jun

=== Disbanded groups ===
- N.EX.T
- Solid

== Releases in 1997 ==
=== January ===
| Date | Title | Artist | Genre(s) |
|---|---|---|---|
| 1 | Cycle | Lee Seung-hwan | Pop ballad |
| 25 | Lover | Roo'ra | Hip hop |

=== February ===
| Date | Title | Artist | Genre(s) |
|---|---|---|---|
| 13 | Legend | Kim Hyun-jung | Dance, R&B |

=== March ===
| Date | Title | Artist | Genre(s) |
|---|---|---|---|
| 1 | Jinusean | Jinusean | K-pop, Hip hop |
| 3 | Sinawe 6 | Sinawe | Heavy metal |
| 3 | West Side | Yoo Seung-jun | K-pop, Hip hop |
| 26 | Deux Forever | Deux | K-pop, Hip hop |

=== April ===
| Date | Title | Artist | Genre(s) | Ref |
|---|---|---|---|---|
| 1 | 4th album | DJ DOC | Hip hop | |
| 24 | Solidate | Solid | K-pop, R&B, Hip hop | |

=== May ===
| Date | Title | Artist | Genre(s) |
|---|---|---|---|
| 14 | School Anthem | Sechs Kies | K-pop, hip hop, dance-pop, R&B |
| 16 | Again | Im Chang-jung | K-pop |
| 20 | Young Turks Club 2nd Album | Young Turks Club | K-pop |

=== June ===
| Date | Title | Artist | Genre(s) |
|---|---|---|---|
| 8 | One More Time | Clon | Dance music |
| 24 | Turbo Summer Remix | Turbo | K-pop, Dance, Hip hop |
| 30 | Kim:kyungho 1997 | Kim Kyung-ho | Hard rock |

=== July ===
| Date | Title | Artist | Genre(s) |
|---|---|---|---|
| 1 | Desire to Fly | Yim Jae-beom | Rock |
| 1 | Summer Story | Cool | K-pop |
| 5 | Wolf and Sheep | H.O.T. | K-pop |
| 10 | EQUALIZEHER | Baby V.O.X | K-pop |
| 21 | Kim Ji Hoon Vol. 1 | Kim Ji-hoon | K-pop |

=== August ===
| Date | Title | Artist | Genre(s) |
|---|---|---|---|
| 8 | Deli Spice | Delispice | Rock |
| 29 | Funky Diva | Diva | K-pop |

=== September ===
| Date | Title | Artist | Genre(s) |
|---|---|---|---|
| 1 | Summer Jingle Bell | JYPark | K-pop, Hip hop |
| 4 | U-BeS | U-BeS | K-pop |

=== October ===
| Date | Title | Artist | Genre(s) |
|---|---|---|---|
| 22 | Born Again | Turbo | K-pop, Dance, Hip hop |
| 25 | Indelible Impression | Lee Ki-chan | R&B |
| 28 | New Radiancy Group | NRG | K-pop |

=== November ===
| Date | Title | Artist | Genre(s) |
|---|---|---|---|
| 1 | I'm Your Girl | S.E.S. | K-pop, Dance |
| 1 | Welcome to the Sechskies Land | Sechs Kies | K-pop |
| 1 | Myself | Kim Gun-mo | K-pop |
| 1 | Skyblue Dream (하늘색 꿈) | Park Ji-yoon | K-pop |
| 17 | Sunflower | Pearl | K-pop, R&B, Hip hop |
| 30 | Lazenca (A Space Rock Opera) | N.EX.T | Heavy metal, hard rock, progressive metal, alternative metal |

=== December ===
| Date | Title | Artist | Genre(s) |
|---|---|---|---|
| 26 | 햐안전쟁 | Young Turks Club | K-pop |
| —N/a | Rainbow | Sanulrim | Psychedelic rock |
