= I Am Santa Claus =

Studio album by Bob Rivers & Twisted Radio
- Released: November 2, 1993
- Recorded: Bob's Garage Inc, North Bend WA, KISW Radio Seattle WA, 1993
- Genres: Christmas, Comedy
- Length: 40:34
- Label: Atlantic

Bob Rivers & Twisted Radio chronology
Twisted Christmas (1987)	I Am Santa Claus (1993)	More Twisted Christmas (1997)

I Am Santa Claus is the second Christmas album by Bob Rivers & Twisted Radio. It was released in November 1993 by Atlantic Records (WEA 82548), five years after Twisted Christmas, and four years before More Twisted Christmas.

== Track listing ==
1. "There's Another Santa Claus" - 2:01
  - (parody of "Here Comes Santa Claus," performed by a Gene Autry impersonator)
2. "Walkin' 'Round in Women's Underwear" - 1:55
  - (parody of "Winter Wonderland" about cross-dressing) performed by a-capella group Fifth Inversion
3. "I Am Santa Claus" - 3:22
  - (sung to tune of "Iron Man" by Black Sabbath, except the last ten notes on the prominent guitar riff are replaced with five notes from Jingle Bells.)
  - A music video was made for the title track, in which Rivers, playing a father of two, inexplicably transforms into a heavy-metal Santa Claus riding in a reindeer-pulled limousine on Christmas Eve. In a meta-cameo, Ozzy Osbourne, in a black-and-white universe watching the video on a television, angrily turns the TV off, transforming metal-Santa (in the middle of a concert) back into Rivers.
4. "Manger 6" - 0:44
  - (parody of Motel 6 ads, narrated by a Tom Bodett impersonator)
5. "O Little Town of Bethlehem" - 2:09
  - (sung to the tune of "The House of the Rising Sun" as performed by The Animals)
6. "I Came Upon a Roadkill Deer" - 3:01
  - (parody of "It Came Upon the Midnight Clear")
7. "Teddy the Red-Nosed Senator" - 1:25
  - (parody of "Rudolph the Red-Nosed Reindeer" as performed by Burl Ives; about US Senator Ted Kennedy and his drinking, see Chappaquiddick incident)
8. "Grahbe Yahbalz" - 1:08
  - (parody of "Deck the Halls"; the name is pseudo-Yiddish for censorship purposes, song describes a gesture frequently used by Michael Jackson)
9. "A Letter to Santa" - 2:41
  - (spoken-word piece in which Vito Corleone from The Godfather writes a letter to Santa Claus)
10. "Jingle Hells Bells" - 2:38
  - (uses riffs of "Highway to Hell" and "T.N.T."; sung to the tune of "My Favorite Things", performed in the style of Bon Scott-era AC/DC)
11. "The Kids" - 2:18
  - spoken by Bob Rivers
12. "The Magical Kingdom of Claus" - 5:53
  - (mini-musical parody of The Wizard of Oz, in which the Emerald City/North Pole is replaced with a commercialized shopping mall-type environment, briefly parodies the song "If I Only Had a Brain")
13. "The 'What's It to Ya' Chorus - 2:37
  - (parody of Handel's "The Hallelujah Chorus" from The Messiah, with the chorus insisting to the listener to mind one's own business)
14. "Didn't I Get This Last Year?" - 3:22
  - (parody of "Do You Hear What I Hear" about repeatedly getting unpleasant gifts, if not the same ones, each year.)
15. "The Under the Tree World of Jacques Cousteau" - 3:02
  - (spoken word piece, narrated by a Cousteau impersonator)
16. "O Christmas Tree" - 2:33
  - Instrumental set to the sounds of chainsaws.

== Critical reaction ==
J. D. Considine wrote in the Baltimore Sun that "Rivers' idea of 'funny' generally seems the work of a guy who's read too many issues of Mad magazine, but there are some good bits here." Helen Bryant of The Dallas Morning News wrote "Irving Berlin, it's not" while the Pittsburgh Post-Gazette called the album "this year's hip offering."

== Chart performance ==
By late December 2003, the album had already sold more than 100,000 copies. I Am Santa Claus entered the Billboard Top Albums chart at #180 before peaking at #106.
