= The Twelve Days of Christmas (song) =

English Christmas carol from late 18th century

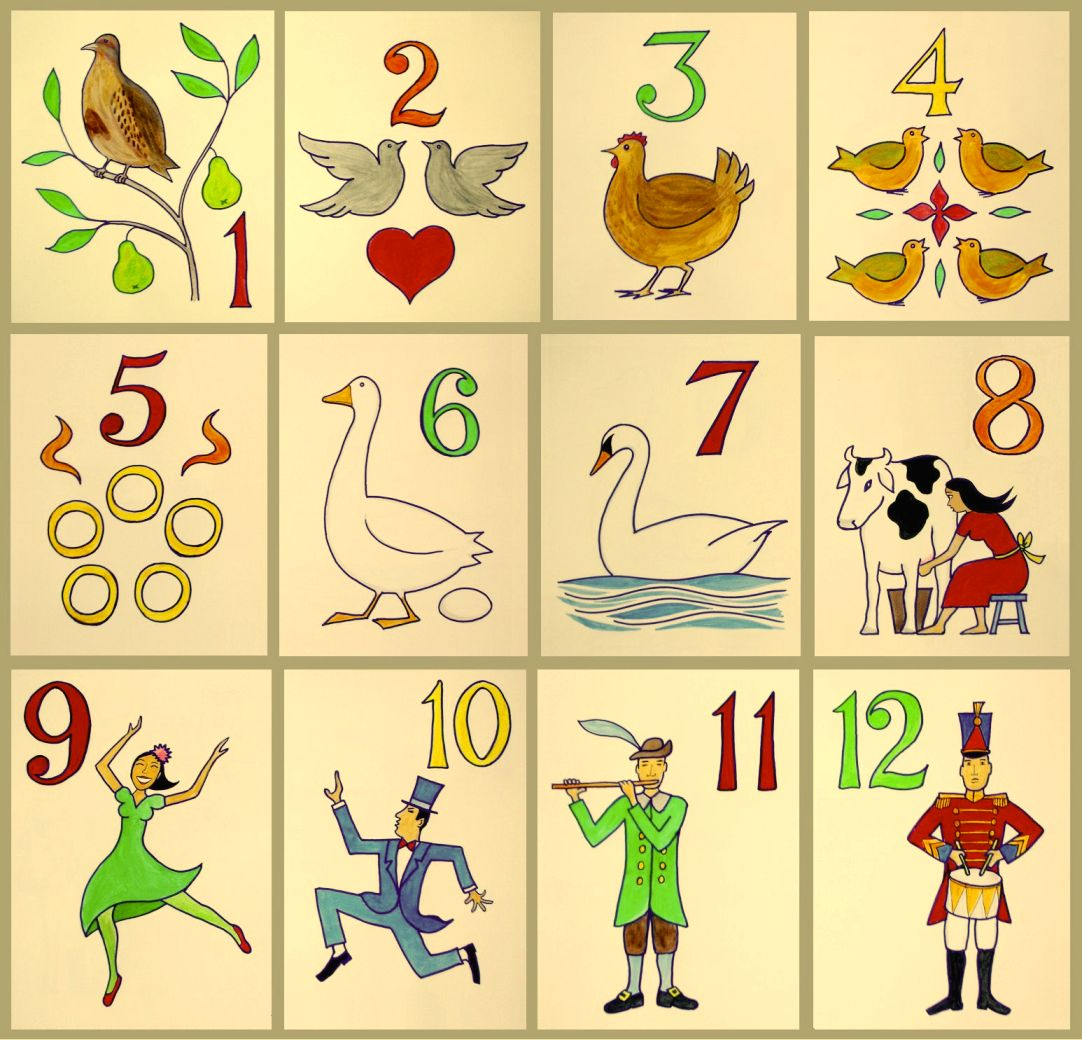

Song
- Published: c. 1780
- Genre: Christmas carol, nursery rhyme (counting-out)
- Composer: Traditional with additions by Frederic Austin

"The Twelve Days of Christmas" is an English Christmas carol and nursery rhyme. A classic example of a cumulative song, the lyrics detail a series of increasingly numerous gifts given to the speaker by their "true love" on each of the twelve days of Christmas (the twelve days that make up the Christmas season, starting with Christmas Day). The carol, whose words were first published in England in the late eighteenth century, has a Roud Folk Song Index number of 68. A large number of different melodies have been associated with the song, of which the best known is derived from a 1909 arrangement of a traditional folk melody by English composer Frederic Austin.

== Lyrics ==
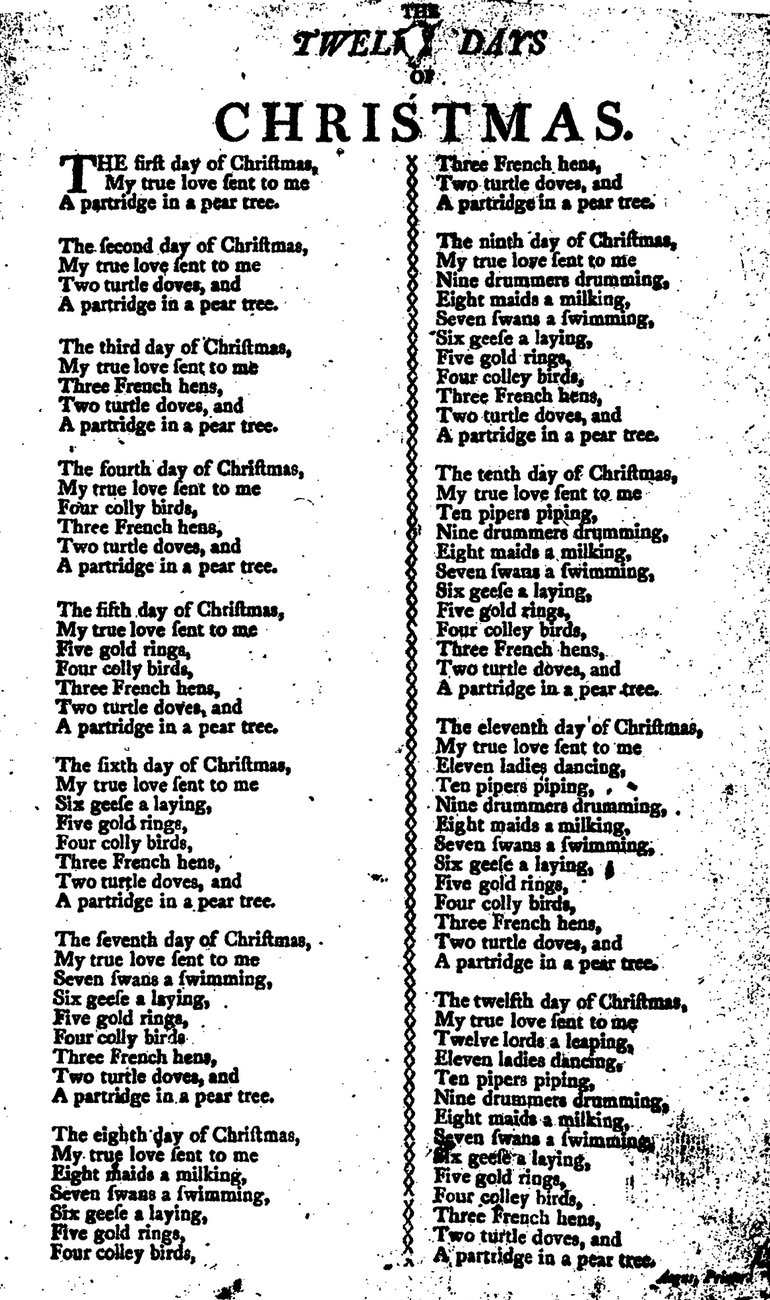
Anonymous broadside, Angus, Newcastle, 1774–1825

"The Twelve Days of Christmas" is a cumulative song, meaning that each verse is built on top of the previous verses. There are twelve verses, each describing a gift given by "my true love" on one of the twelve days of Christmas. There are many variations in the lyrics. The lyrics given here are from Frederic Austin's 1909 publication that established the current form of the carol. The first three verses run, in full, as follows:

On the first day of Christmas my true love sent to me
A partridge in a pear tree

On the second day of Christmas my true love sent to me
Two turtle doves,
And a partridge in a pear tree.

On the third day of Christmas my true love sent to me
Three French hens,
Two turtle doves,
And a partridge in a pear tree.

Subsequent verses follow the same pattern. Each verse deals with the next day of Christmastide, adding one new gift and then repeating all the earlier gifts, so that each verse is one line longer than its predecessor.

- four calling birds
- five gold rings
- six geese a-laying
- seven swans a-swimming
- eight maids a-milking
- nine ladies dancing
- ten lords a-leaping
- eleven pipers piping
- twelve drummers drumming

=== Variations of the lyrics ===
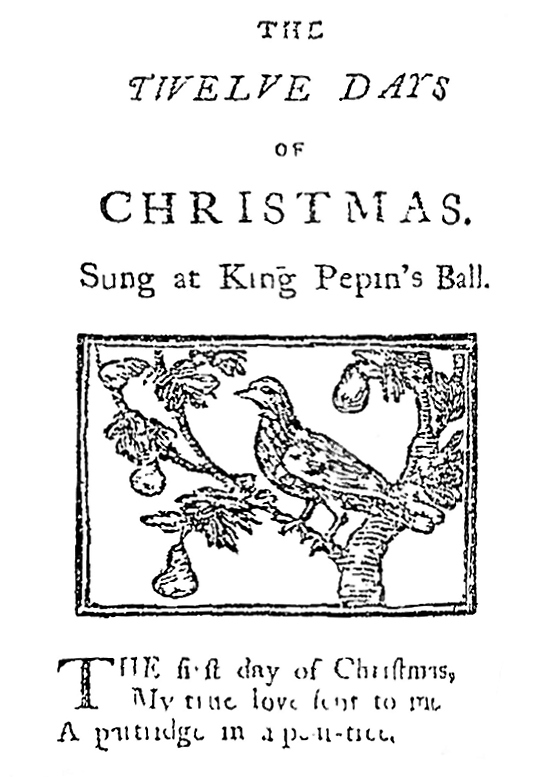
First page of the carol, from Mirth Without Mischief (c. 1780)

The earliest known publications of the words to "The Twelve Days of Christmas" were an illustrated children's book, Mirth Without Mischief, published in London in 1780, and a broadsheet by Angus, of Newcastle, dated to the late eighteenth or early nineteenth centuries.

While the words as published in Mirth Without Mischief and the Angus broadsheet were almost identical, subsequent versions (beginning with James Orchard Halliwell's Nursery Rhymes of England of 1842) have displayed considerable variation:

- In early versions, at the beginning of each verse, the word on is skipped; for example, the final verse begins simply as "The twelfth day of Christmas". On was added in Austin's 1909 version, and became very popular thereafter.
- In the early versions "my true love sent to me" the gifts. However, a 20th-century variant has "my true love gave to me"; this wording has become particularly common in North America.
- The 1780 version has "four colly birds"—colly being a regional English expression for "coal-black" (the name of the collie dog breed may come from this word). This wording must have been opaque to many even in the 19th century: "canary birds", "colour'd birds", "curley birds", and "corley birds" are found in its place. Austin's 1909 version, which introduced the now-standard melody, also changed the fourth gift to four "calling" birds, and this variant has become the most popular, although "colly" is still occasionally found.
- "Five gold rings" has often become "five golden rings", especially in North America since the 1961 recording by Mitch Miller and the Gang. In the standard melody, this change enables singers to fit one syllable per musical note.
- The gifts associated with the final four days are often reordered. For example, the pipers may be on the ninth day rather than the eleventh.

For ease of comparison with Austin's 1909 version given above:

1. differences in wording, ignoring capitalization and punctuation, are indicated in italics (including permutations, where for example the 10th day of Austin's version becomes the 9th day here);
2. items that do not appear at all in Austin's version are indicated in **bold italics**.

Source	Giver	1	2	3	4	5	6	7	8	9	10	11	12
Mirth Without; Mischief, 1780	My true love sent to me	Partridge in a pear-tree	Turtle doves	French hens	**Colly** birds	Gold rings	Geese a laying	Swans a swimming	Maids a milking	Drummers drumming	Pipers piping	Ladies dancing	Lords a leaping
Angus, 1774–1825	My true love sent to me	Partridge in a pear tree	Turtle doves	French hens	**Colly** birds	Gold rings	Geese a laying	Swans a swimming	Maids a milking	Ladies Dancing	Lords-a-Leaping	Drummers Drumming	Pipers Piping
Baring-Gould, c. 1840 (1974)	My true love sent to me	**Part of a juniper tree**	Turtle doves	French hens	**Colley** birds	**A golden ring**	Geese a laying	Swans a swimming	**Hares a running**	Ladies dancing	Lords **a playing**	**Bears a baiting**	**Bulls a roaring**
Halliwell, 1842	My **mother** sent to me	Partridge in a pear-tree	Turtle doves	French hens	**Canary** birds	Gold rings	Geese a laying	Swans a swimming	Ladies dancing	Lords a leaping	**Ships a sailing**	**Ladies spinning**	**Bells ringing**
Rimbault, 1846	My **mother** sent to me	**Parteridge** in a pear tree	Turtle doves	French hens	**Canary** birds	Gold rings	Geese a laying	Swans a swimming	Ladies dancing	Lords a leaping	**Ships a sailing**	**Ladies spinning**	**Bells ringing**
Halliwell, 1853	My true love sent to me	Partridge in a pear tree	Turtle doves	French hens	**Colly** birds	Gold rings	Geese a laying	Swans a swimming	Maids a milking	Drummers drumming	Pipers piping	Ladies dancing	Lords a leaping
Salmon, 1855	My true love sent to me	Partridge upon a pear-tree	Turtle-doves	French hens	**Collie** birds	Gold rings	Geese a-laying	Swans a-swimming	Maids a-milking	Drummers drumming	Pipers piping	Ladies dancing	Lords a-leaping
Caledonian, 1858	My true love sent to me	Partridge upon a pear-tree	Turtle-doves	French hens	**Collie** birds	Gold rings	Geese a-laying	Swans a-swimming	Maids a-milking	Drummers drumming	**Fifers fifing**	Ladies dancing	Lords a-leaping
Husk, 1864	My true love sent to me	Partridge in a pear-tree	Turtle doves	French hens	**Colley** birds	Gold rings	Geese a-laying	Swans a-swimming	Maids a-milking	Drummers drumming	Pipers piping	Ladies dancing	Lords a-leaping
Hughes, 1864	My true love sent to me	Partridge **and** a pear tree	Turtle-doves	**Fat** hens	**Ducks quacking**	**Hares running**	"and so on"	—	—	—	—	—	—
Cliftonian, 1867	My true-love sent to me	Partridge in a pear-tree	Turtle-doves	French hens	**Colley** birds	Gold rings	**Ducks** a-laying	Swans swimming	**Hares a-running**	Ladies dancing	Lords a-leaping	**Badgers baiting**	**Bells a-ringing**
Clark, 1875	My true love sent to me	Partridge in a pear tree	Turtle doves	French hens	**Colour'd** birds	Gold rings	Geese laying	Swans swimming	Maids milking	Drummers drumming	Pipers piping	Ladies dancing	Lords leaping
Kittredge, 1877 (1917)	My true love sent to me	**Some part of a juniper tree/And some part of a juniper tree**	French hens	Turtle doves	**Colly** birds	Gold rings	Geese a-laying	Swans a-swimming	[forgotten by the singer]	**Lambs a-bleating**	Ladies dancing	**Lords a-leading**	**Bells a-ringing**
Henderson, 1879	My true love sent to me	Partridge upon a pear tree	Turtle doves	French hens	**Curley** birds	Gold rings	Geese laying	Swans swimming	Maids milking	Drummers drumming	Pipers piping	—	—
Barnes, 1882	My true love sent to me	**The sprig of a juniper tree**	Turtle doves	French hens	**Coloured** birds	Gold rings	Geese a-laying	Swans a-swimming	**Hares a-running**	**Bulls a-roaring**	**Men a-mowing**	**Dancers a-dancing**	**Fiddlers a-fiddling**
Stokoe, 1882	My true love sent to me	Partridge on a pear tree	Turtle doves	French hens	**Colly** birds	Gold rings	Geese a-laying	Swans a-swimming	Maids a-milking	Drummers drumming	Pipers piping	Ladies dancing	Lords a leaping
Kidson, 1891	My true love sent to me	Merry partridge on a pear tree	Turtle doves	French hens	**Colley** birds	Gold rings	Geese a-laying	Swans a-swimming	Maids a-milking	Drummers drumming	Pipers piping	Ladies dancing	Lords a leaping
Scott, 1892	My true love brought to me	**Very pretty peacock** upon a pear tree	Turtle-doves	French hens	**Corley** birds	Gold rings	Geese a-laying	Swans a-swimming	Maids a-milking	Pipers playing	Drummers drumming	**Lads a-louping**	Ladies dancing
Cole, 1900	My true love sent to me	Parteridge upon a pear tree	Turtle doves	French hens	**Colly** birds	Gold rings	Geese a laying	**Squabs** a swimming	**Hounds a running**	**Bears a beating**	**Cocks a crowing**	Lords a leaping	Ladies a dancing
Sharp, 1905	My true love sent to me	Goldie ring, and the part of a June apple tree	Turtle doves, and the part of a mistletoe bough	French hens	**Colley** birds	Goldie rings	Geese a-laying	Swans a-swimming	**Boys a-singing**	Ladies dancing	**Asses racing**	**Bulls a-beating**	**Bells a-ringing**
Leicester Daily Post, 1907	My true love sent to me	A partridge upon a pear-tree	Turtle doves	French hens	**Collie dogs**	Gold rings	Geese a-laying	Swans a-swimming	Maids a milking	Drummers drumming	Pipers playing	Ladies dancing	Lords a-leaping
Austin, 1909	My true love sent to me	Partridge in a pear tree	Turtle doves	French hens	Calling birds	Gold rings	Geese a-laying	Swans a-swimming	Maids a-milking	Ladies dancing	Lords a-leaping	Pipers piping	Drummers drumming
Swortzell, 1966	My true love gave to me	Partridge in a pear tree	Turtle doves	French hens	**Collie** birds	Golden rings	Geese a-laying	Swans a-swimming	Maids a-milking	Pipers piping	Drummers drumming	Lords a-leaping	Ladies dancing

==== Scotland ====
A similar cumulative verse from Scotland, "The Yule Days", has been likened to "The Twelve Days of Christmas" in the scholarly literature. It has thirteen days rather than twelve, and the number of gifts does not increase in the manner of "The Twelve Days". Its final verse, as published in Chambers, Popular Rhymes, Fireside Stories, and Amusements of Scotland (1842), runs as follows:

The king sent his lady on the thirteenth Yule day,
Three stalks o' merry corn,
Three maids a-merry dancing,
Three hinds a-merry hunting,
An Arabian baboon,
Three swans a-merry swimming,
Three ducks a-merry laying,
A bull that was brown,
Three goldspinks,
Three starlings,
A goose that was grey,
Three plovers,
Three partridges,
A pippin go aye;
Wha learns my carol and carries it away?

"Pippin go aye" (also spelled "papingo-aye" in later editions) is a Scots word for peacock or parrot.

Similarly, Iceland has a Christmas tradition where "Yule Lads" put gifts in the shoes of children for each of the 13 nights of Christmas.

==== Faroe Islands ====
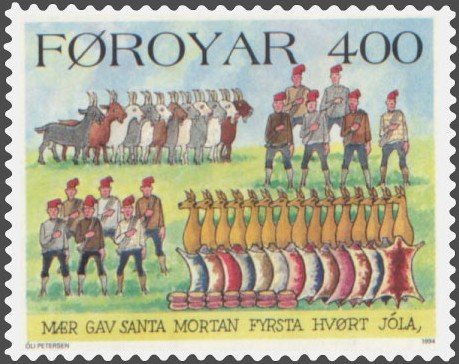
One of the two "Twelve Days of Christmas" Faroe stamps

In the Faroe Islands, there is a comparable counting Christmas song. The gifts include: one feather, two geese, three sides of meat, four sheep, five cows, six oxen, seven dishes, eight ponies, nine banners, ten barrels, eleven goats, twelve men, thirteen hides, fourteen rounds of cheese and fifteen deer. These were illustrated in 1994 by local cartoonist Óli Petersen (born 1936) on a series of two stamps issued by the Faroese Philatelic Office.

==== Sweden ====
In Blekinge and Småland, southern Sweden, a similar song was also sung. It featured one hen, two barley seeds, three grey geese, four pounds of pork, six flayed sheep, a sow with six pigs, seven åttings of grain, eight grey foals with golden saddles, nine newly born cows, ten pairs of oxen, eleven clocks, and finally twelve churches, each with twelve altars, each with twelve priests, each with twelve capes, each with twelve coin-purses, each with twelve daler inside.

==== France ====
"Les Douze Mois" ("The Twelve Months") (also known as "La Perdriole"—"The Partridge") is another similar cumulative verse from France that has been likened to The Twelve Days of Christmas. Its final verse, as published in de Coussemaker, Chants Populaires des Flamands de France (1856), runs as follows:

Le douzièm' jour d'l'année,
Que me donn'rez vous ma mie?
Douze coqs chantants,
Onze plats d'argent,
Dix pigeons blancs,
Neuf bœufs cornus,
Huit vaches mordants,
Sept moulins à vent,
Six chiens courants,
Cinq lapins courant par terre,
Quat' canards volant en l'air,
Trois rameaux de bois,
Deux tourterelles,
Un' perdrix sole,
Qui va, qui vient, qui vole,
Qui vole dans les bois.

Translation:

The twelfth day of the year
What will you give me, my love?
Twelve singing cockerels,
Eleven silver dishes,
Ten white pigeons,
Nine horned oxen,
Eight biting cows,
Seven windmills,
Six running dogs,
Five rabbits running along the ground,
Four ducks flying in the air,
Three wooden branches,
Two turtle doves,
One lone partridge,
Who goes, who comes, who flies,
Who flies in the woods.

According to de Coussemaker, the song was recorded "in the part of [French] Flanders that borders on the Pas de Calais". Another similar folksong, "Les Dons de l'An", was recorded in the Cambresis region of France. Its final verse, as published in 1864, runs:

Le douzièm' mois de l'an,
que donner à ma mie?
Douz' bons larrons,
Onze bons jambons,
Dix bons dindons,
Neuf bœufs cornus,
Huit moutons tondus,
Sept chiens courants,
Six lièvres aux champs,
Cinq lapins trottant par terre,
Quatre canards volant en l'air,
Trois ramiers de bois,
Deux tourterelles,
Une pertriolle,
Qui vole, et vole, et vole,
Une pertriolle,
Qui vole
Du bois au champ.

Translation:

The twelfth month of the year
What should I give my love?
Twelve good cheeses,
Eleven good hams,
Ten good turkeycocks,
Nine horned oxen,
Eight sheared sheep,
Seven running dogs,
Six hares in the field,
Five rabbits trotting along the ground,
Four ducks flying in the air,
Three wood pigeons,
Two turtle doves,
One young partridge,
Who flies, who flies, who flies,
One young partridge,
Who flies
From the wood to the field.

== History and meaning ==
=== Origins ===
The exact origins and the meaning of the song are unknown, but it is highly probable that it originated from a children's memory and forfeit game.

The twelve days in the song are the twelve days starting with Christmas Day to the day before Epiphany (which occurs on 6 January). Twelfth Night is defined by the Oxford English Dictionary as "the evening of January 5th, the day before Epiphany, which traditionally marks the end of Christmas celebrations".

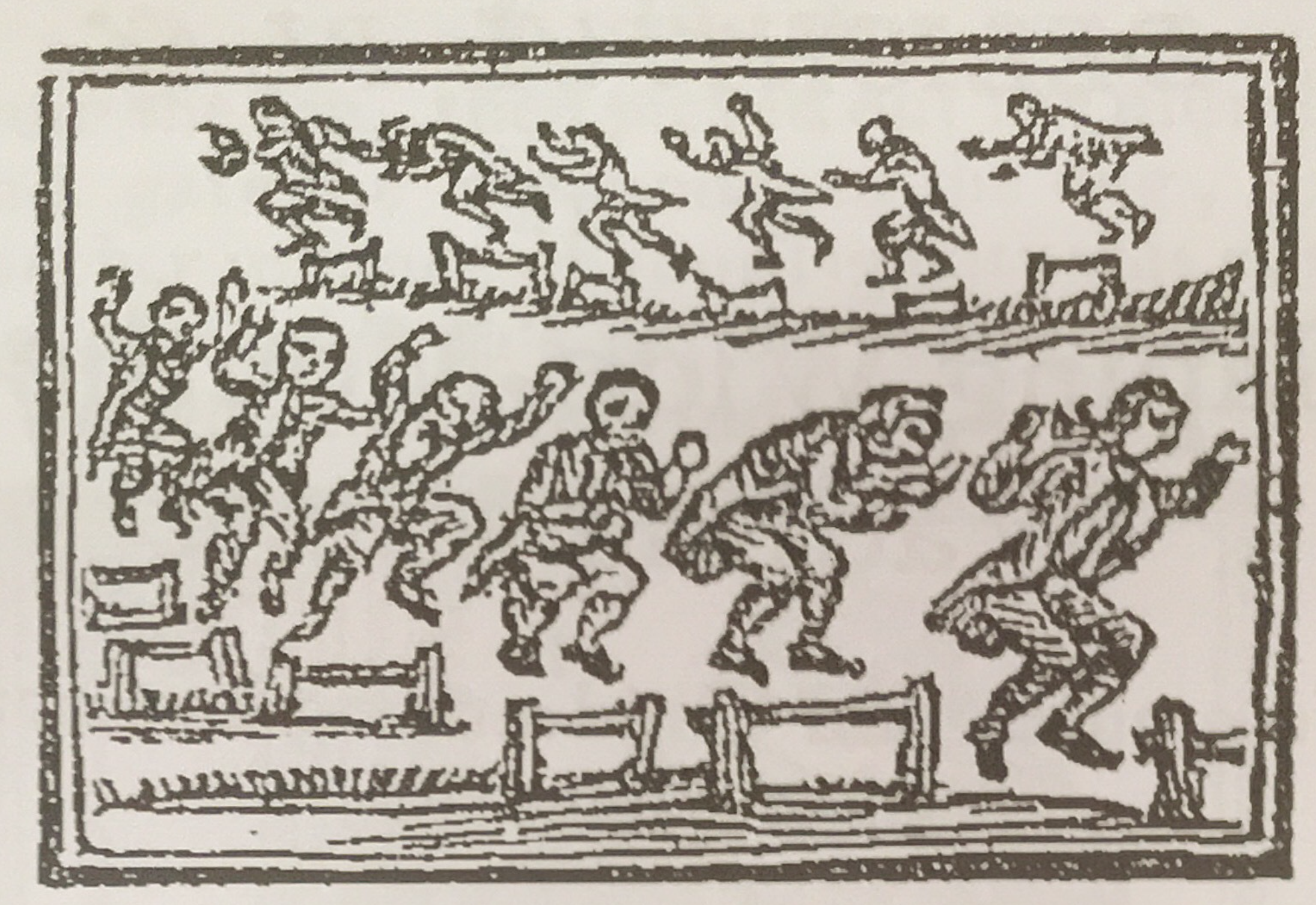
Illustration of "Twelve Lords a Leaping", from Mirth Without Mischief

The best known English version was first printed in Mirth without Mischief, a children's book published in London around 1780. The work was heavily illustrated with woodcuts, attributed in one source to Thomas Bewick.

In the northern counties of England, the song was often called the "Ten Days of Christmas", as there were only ten gifts. It was also known in Somerset, Dorset, and elsewhere in England. The kinds of gifts vary in a number of the versions, some of them becoming alliterative tongue-twisters. "The Twelve Days of Christmas" was also widely popular in the United States and Canada. It is mentioned in the section on "Chain Songs" in Stith Thompson's Motif-Index of Folk-Literature (Indiana University Studies, Vol. 5, 1935), p. 416.

There is evidence pointing to the North of England, specifically the area around Newcastle upon Tyne, as the origin of the carol. William Henry Husk, in the 1864 excerpt quoted below, stated that the carol was "found on broadsides printed at Newcastle at various periods during the last hundred and fifty years", i.e. from approximately 1714. In addition, many of the nineteenth century citations come from the Newcastle area. Peter and Iona Opie suggest that "if '[t]he partridge in the peartree' is to be taken literally it looks as if the chant comes from France, since the Red Leg partridge, which perches in trees more frequently than the common partridge, was not successfully introduced into England until about 1770".

Some authors suggest a connection to a religious verse entitled "Twelfth Day", found in a thirteenth century manuscript at Trinity College, Cambridge; this theory is criticised as "erroneous" by Yoffie. It has also been suggested that this carol is connected to the "old ballad" which Sir Toby Belch begins to sing in Shakespeare's Twelfth Night.

=== Manner of performance ===
Many early sources suggest that The Twelve Days of Christmas was a "memory-and-forfeits" game, in which participants were required to repeat a verse of poetry recited by the leader. Players who made an error were required to pay a penalty, in the form of offering a kiss or confection.

Halliwell, writing in 1842, stated that "[e]ach child in succession repeats the gifts of the day, and forfeits for each mistake."

Salmon, writing from Newcastle, claimed in 1855 that the song "[had] been, up to within twenty years, extremely popular as a schoolboy's Christmas chant".

Husk, writing in 1864, stated:

This piece is found on broadsides printed at Newcastle at various periods during the last hundred and fifty years. On one of these sheets, nearly a century old, it is entitled "An Old English Carol," but it can scarcely be said to fall within that description of composition, being rather fitted for use in playing the game of "Forfeits," to which purpose it was commonly applied in the metropolis upwards of forty years since. The practice was for one person in the company to recite the first three lines; a second, the four following; and so on; the person who failed in repeating her portion correctly being subjected to some trifling forfeit.

Thomas Hughes, in a short story published in 1864, described a fictional game of Forfeits involving the song:

[A] cry for forfeits arose. So the party sat down round Mabel on benches brought out from under the table, and Mabel began, --

The first day of Christmas my true love sent to me a partridge and a pear-tree;

The second day of Christmas my true love sent to me two turtle-doves, a partridge, and a pear-tree;

The third day of Christmas my true love sent to me three fat hens, two turtle-doves, a partridge, and a pear-tree;

The fourth day of Christmas my true love sent to me four ducks quacking, three fat hens, two turtle-doves, a partridge, and a pear-tree;

The fifth day of Christmas my true love sent to me five hares running, four ducks quacking, three fat hens, two turtle-doves, a partridge, and a pear-tree;

And so on. Each day was taken up and repeated all round; and for every breakdown (except by little Maggie, who struggled with desperately earnest round eyes to follow the rest correctly, but with very comical results), the player who made the slip was duly noted down by Mabel for a forfeit.

Barnes (1882), stated that the last verse "is to be said in one breath".

Scott (1892), reminiscing about Christmas and New Year's celebrations in Newcastle around the year 1844, described a performance thus:

A lady begins it, generally an elderly lady, singing the first line in a high clear voice, the person sitting next takes up the second, the third follows, at first gently, but before twelfth day is reached the whole circle were joining in with stentorian noise and wonderful enjoyment.

Lady Gomme wrote in 1898:

"The Twelve Days" was a Christmas game. It was a customary thing in a friend's house to play "The Twelve Days," or "My Lady's Lap Dog," every Twelfth Day night. The party was usually a mixed gathering of juveniles and adults, mostly relatives, and before supper—that is, before eating mince pies and twelfth cake—this game and the cushion dance were played, and the forfeits consequent upon them always cried. The company were all seated round the room. The leader of the game commenced by saying the first line. [...] The lines for the "first day" of Christmas was said by each of the company in turn; then the first "day" was repeated, with the addition of the "second" by the leader, and then this was said all round the circle in turn. This was continued until the lines for the "twelve days" were said by every player. For every mistake a forfeit—a small article belonging to the person—had to be given up. These forfeits were afterwards "cried" in the usual way, and were not returned to the owner until they had been redeemed by the penalty inflicted being performed.

=== The meaning of each gift ===
==== Partridge in a pear tree ====
An anonymous "antiquarian", writing in 1867, speculated that "pear-tree" is a corruption of French perdrix ([pɛʁ.dʁi], "partridge"). This was also suggested by Anne Gilchrist, who observed in 1916 that "from the constancy in English, French, and Languedoc versions of the 'merry little partridge,' I suspect that 'pear-tree' is really perdrix (Old French pertriz) carried into England". The variant text "part of a juniper tree", found as early as c. 1840, is likely not original, since "partridge" is found in the French versions. It is probably a corruption of "partridge in a pear tree", though Gilchrist suggests "juniper tree" could have been joli perdrix, [pretty partridge].

Another suggestion is that an old English drinking song may have furnished the idea for the first gift. William B. Sandys refers to it as a "convivial glee introduced a few years since, 'A Pie [i.e., a magpie] sat on a Pear Tree,' where one drinks while the others sing." The image of the bird in the pear tree also appears in lines from a children's counting rhyme an old Mother Goose.

A pye sate on a pear tree, Heigh O
Once so merrily hopp'd she; Heigh O
Twice so merrily, etc.
Thrice so, etc.

==== French hens ====
Gilchrist suggests that the adjective "French" may mean "foreign". Sharp reports that one singer sings "Britten chains", which he interprets as a corruption of "Breton hens". William and Ceil Baring-Gould also suggest that the birds are Breton hens, which they see as another indication that the carol is of French origin.

==== Colly birds ====
The word "colly", found in the earliest publications, was the source of considerable confusion. Multiple sources confirm that it is a dialectal word, found in Somerset and elsewhere, meaning "black", so "colly birds" are blackbirds. Despite this, other theories about the word's origin are also found in the literature, such as that the word is a corruption of French collet ("ruff"), or of "coloured".

==== Gold rings ====
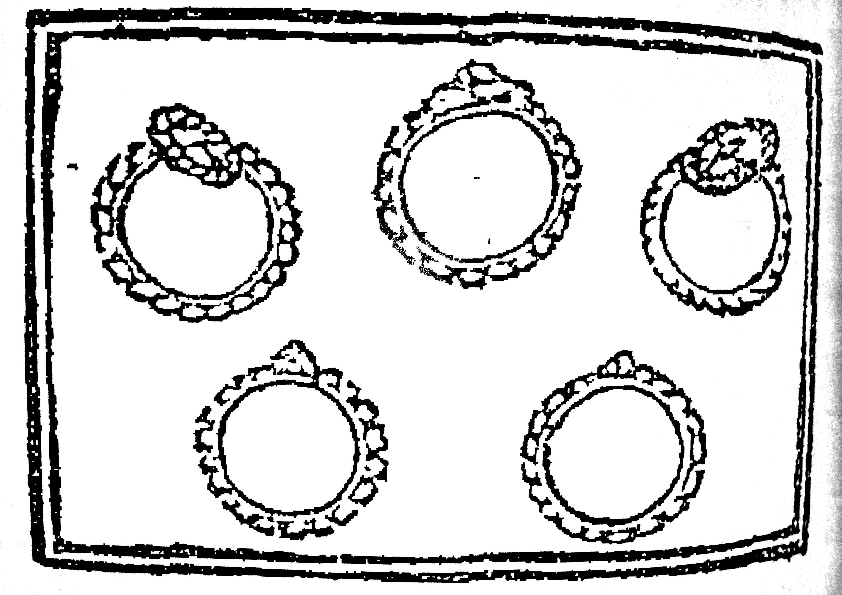
Illustration of "five gold rings", from the first known publication of "The Twelve Days of Christmas" (1780)

Shahn suggests that "the five golden rings refer to the ringed pheasant". William and Ceil Baring-Gould reiterate this idea, which implies that the gifts for the first seven days are all birds. Others suggest the gold rings refer to "five goldspinks"—a goldspink being an old name for a goldfinch; or even canaries. (Note: There is a version of "The Twelve Days of Christmas" that is still sung in Sussex in which the four calling birds are replaced by canaries.) However, the 1780 publication includes an illustration that clearly depicts the "five gold rings" as being jewellery.

==== General ====
According to The Oxford Dictionary of Nursery Rhymes, "Suggestions have been made that the gifts have significance, as representing the food or sport for each month of the year. Importance [certainly has] long been attached to the Twelve Days, when, for instance, the weather on each day was carefully observed to see what it would be in the corresponding month of the coming year. Nevertheless, whatever the ultimate origin of the chant, it seems probable [that] the lines that survive today both in England and France are merely an irreligious travesty." In 1979, a Canadian hymnologist, Hugh D. McKellar, published an article, "How to Decode the Twelve Days of Christmas", in which he suggested that "The Twelve Days of Christmas" lyrics were intended as a catechism song to help young English Catholics learn their faith, at a time when practising Catholicism was against the law (from 1558 until 1829). McKellar offered no evidence for his claim. Three years later, in 1982, Fr. Hal Stockert wrote an article (subsequently posted online, in 1995) in which he suggested a similar possible use of the twelve gifts as part of a catechism. The possibility that the twelve gifts were used as a catechism during the period of Catholic repression was also hypothesised in this same time period (1987 and 1992) by Fr. James Gilhooley, chaplain of Mount Saint Mary College of Newburgh, New York. Snopes.com, a website reviewing urban legends, Internet rumours, e-mail forwards, and other stories of unknown or questionable origin, concludes that the hypothesis of the twelve gifts of Christmas being a surreptitious Catholic catechism is incorrect. None of the enumerated items would distinguish Catholics from Protestants, and so would hardly need to be secretly encoded.

== Music ==
=== Standard melody ===
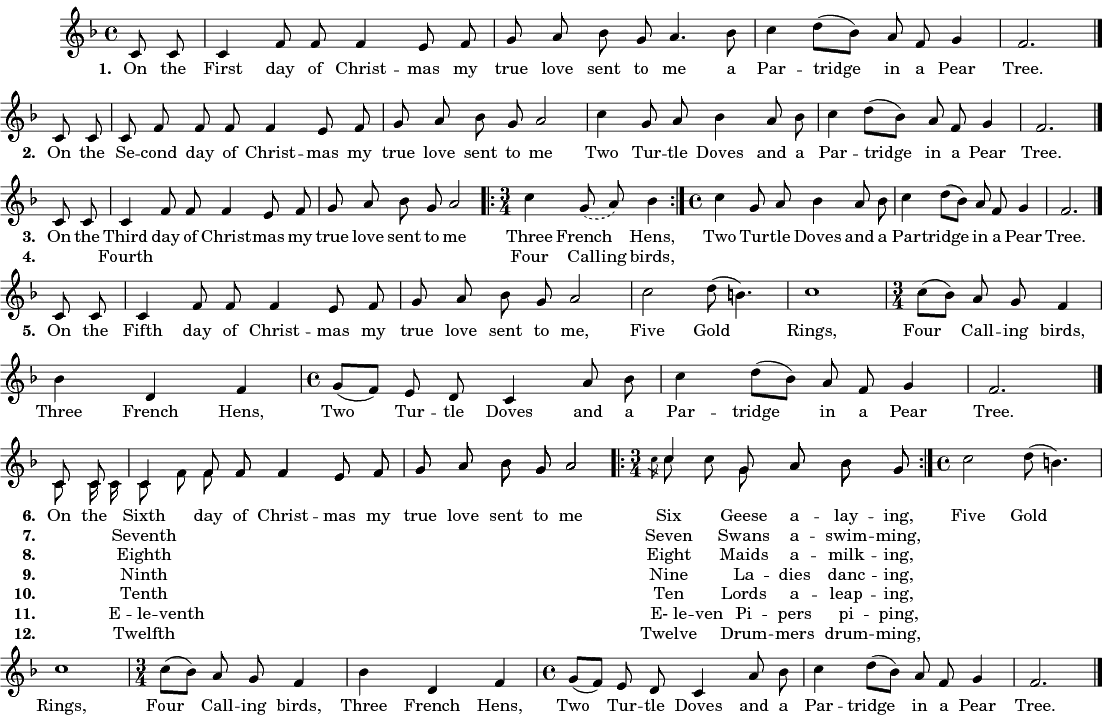
Melody of "The Twelve Days of Christmas", from Austin's 1909 arrangement

The now-standard melody for the carol was popularised by the English baritone and composer Frederic Austin. The singer, having arranged the music for solo voice with piano accompaniment, included it in his concert repertoire from 1905 onwards. A Times review from 1906 praised the "quaint folk-song", while noting that "the words ... are better known than the excellent if intricate tune".

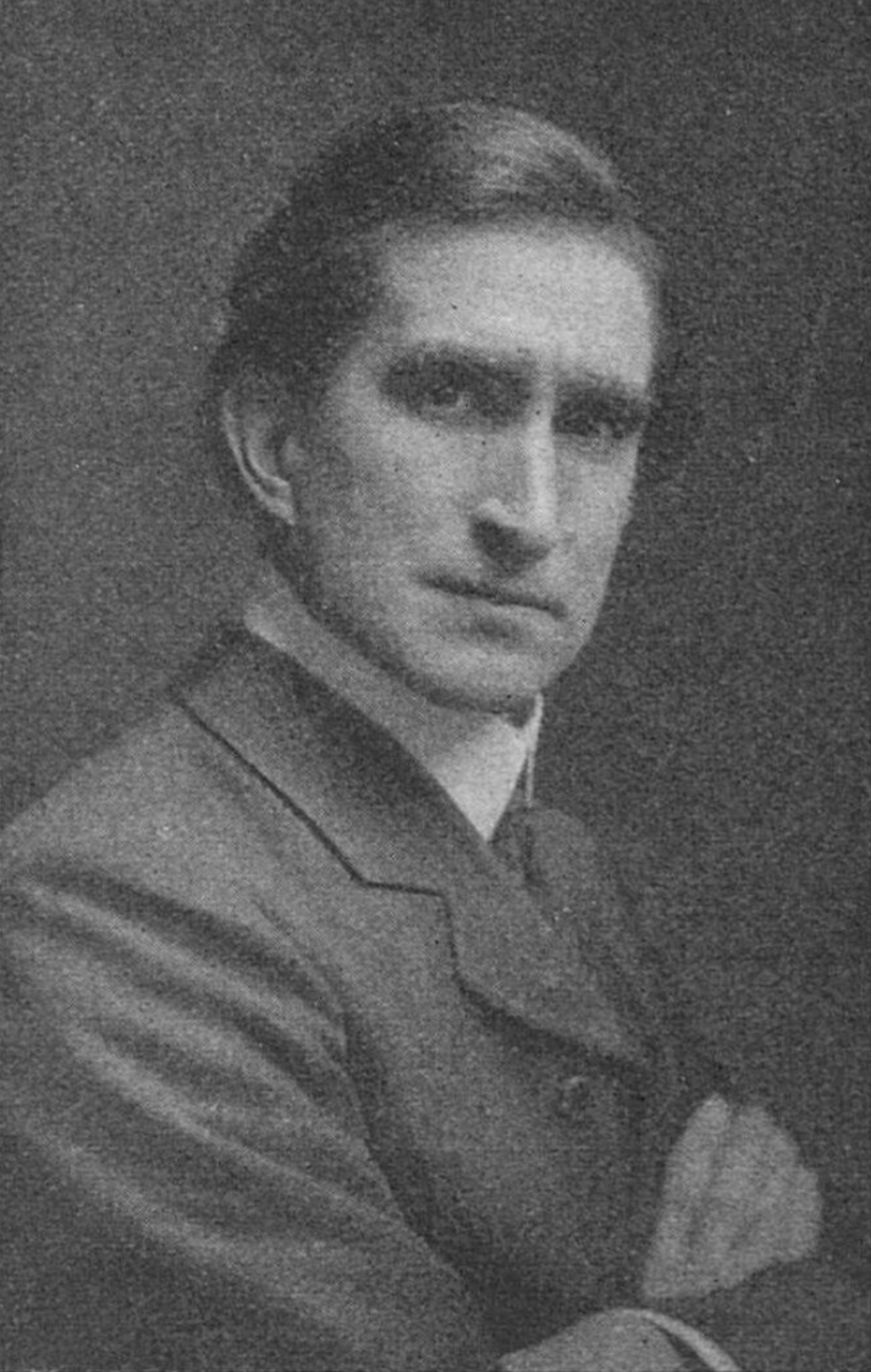
Frederic Austin

Austin's arrangement was published by Novello & Co. in 1909. According to a footnote added to the posthumous 1955 reprint of his musical setting, Austin wrote:

This song was, in my childhood, current in my family. I have not met with the tune of it elsewhere, nor with the particular version of the words, and have, in this setting, recorded both to the best of my recollection. F. A.

A number of later publications state that Austin's music for "five gold rings" is an original addition to an otherwise traditional melody. An early appearance of this claim is found in the 1961 University Carol Book, which states:

This is a traditional English singing game but the melody of five gold rings was added by Richard [sic] Austin whose fine setting (Novello) should be consulted for a fuller accompaniment.

Similar statements are found in John Rutter's 1967 arrangement, and in the 1992 New Oxford Book of Carols.

Many of the decisions Austin made with regard to the lyrics subsequently became widespread:

- The initial "On" at the beginning of each verse.
- The use of "calling birds", rather than "colly birds", on the fourth day.
- The ordering of the ninth to twelfth verses.

The time signature of this song is not constant, unlike most popular music. This irregular meter perhaps reflects the song's folk origin. The introductory lines "On the [nth] day of Christmas, my true love gave to me", are made up of two 4/4 bars, while most of the lines naming gifts receive one 3/4 bar per gift with the exception of "Five gold rings", which receives two 4/4 bars, "Two turtle doves" getting a 4/4 bar with "And a" on its fourth beat and "partridge in a pear tree" getting two 4/4 bars of music. In most versions, a 4/4 bar of music immediately follows "partridge in a pear tree". "On the" is found in that bar on the fourth (pickup) beat for the next verse. The successive bars of three for the gifts surrounded by bars of four give the song its hallmark "hurried" quality.

The second to fourth verses' melody is different from that of the fifth to twelfth verses. Before the fifth verse (when "Five gold rings" is first sung), the melody, using solfege, is "sol re mi fa re" for the fourth to second items, and this same melody is thereafter sung for the twelfth to sixth items. However, the melody for "four colly birds, three French hens, two turtle doves" changes from this point, differing from the way these lines were sung in the opening four verses.

In the final verse, Austin inserted a flourish on the words "Five gold rings". This has not been copied by later versions, which simply repeat the melody from the earlier verses.

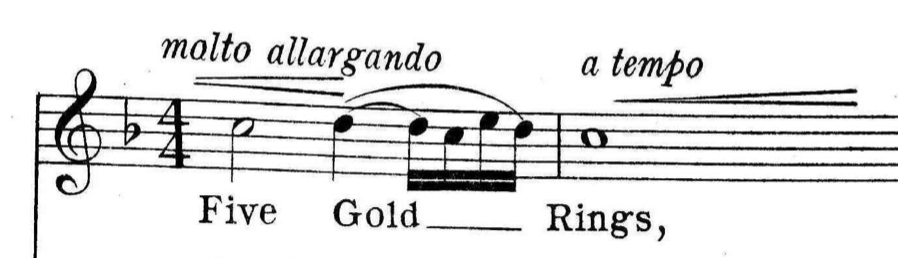

=== Earlier melodies ===
The earliest known sources for the text, such as Mirth Without Mischief, do not include music.

A melody, possibly related to the traditional melody on which Austin based his arrangement, was recorded in Providence, Rhode Island in 1870 and published in 1905. Cecil Sharp's Folk Songs from Somerset (1905) contains two different melodies for the song, both distinct from the now-standard melody.

Older Musical settings of "Twelve Days of Christmas"
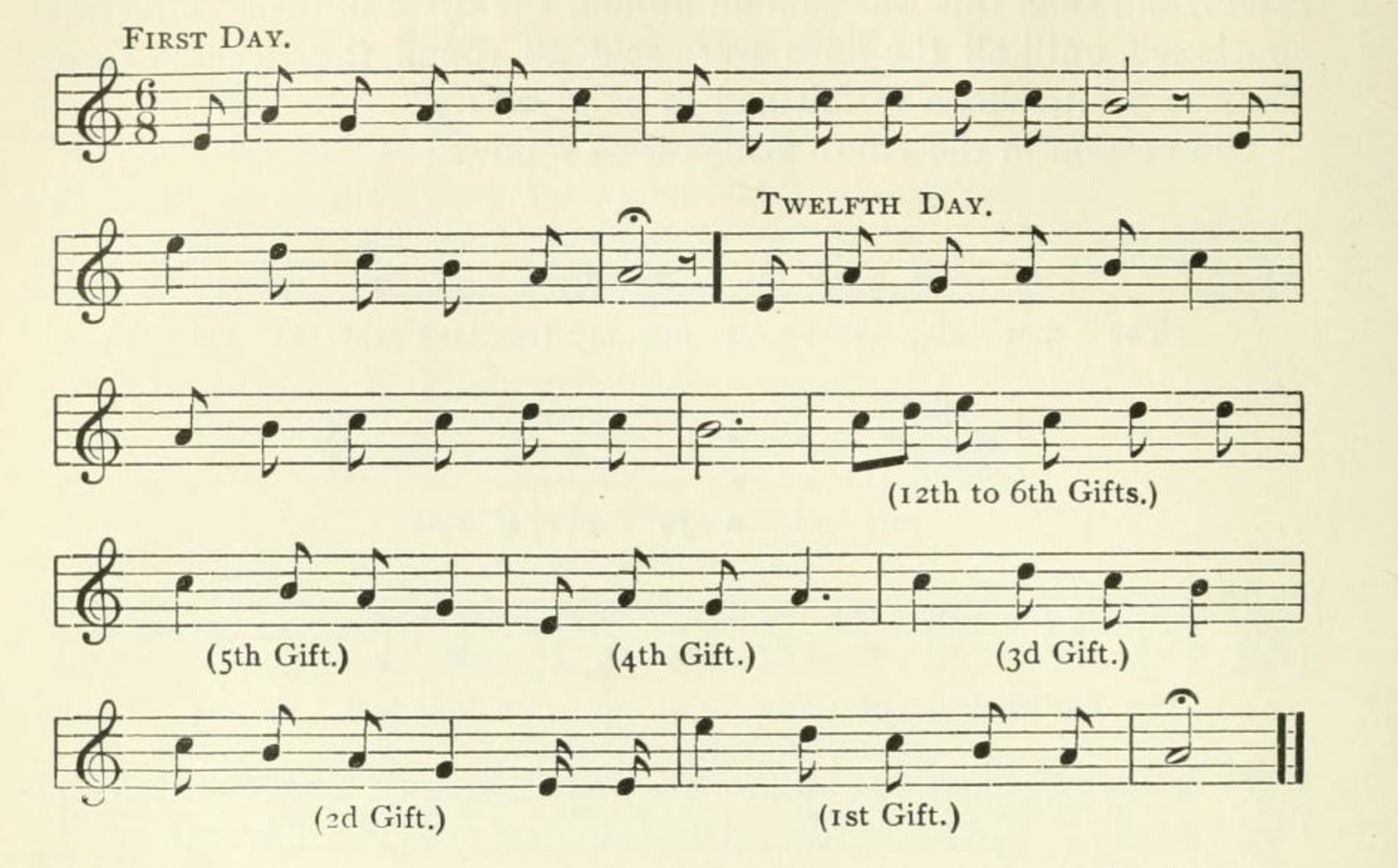
"[C]opied from a manuscript of 1790"

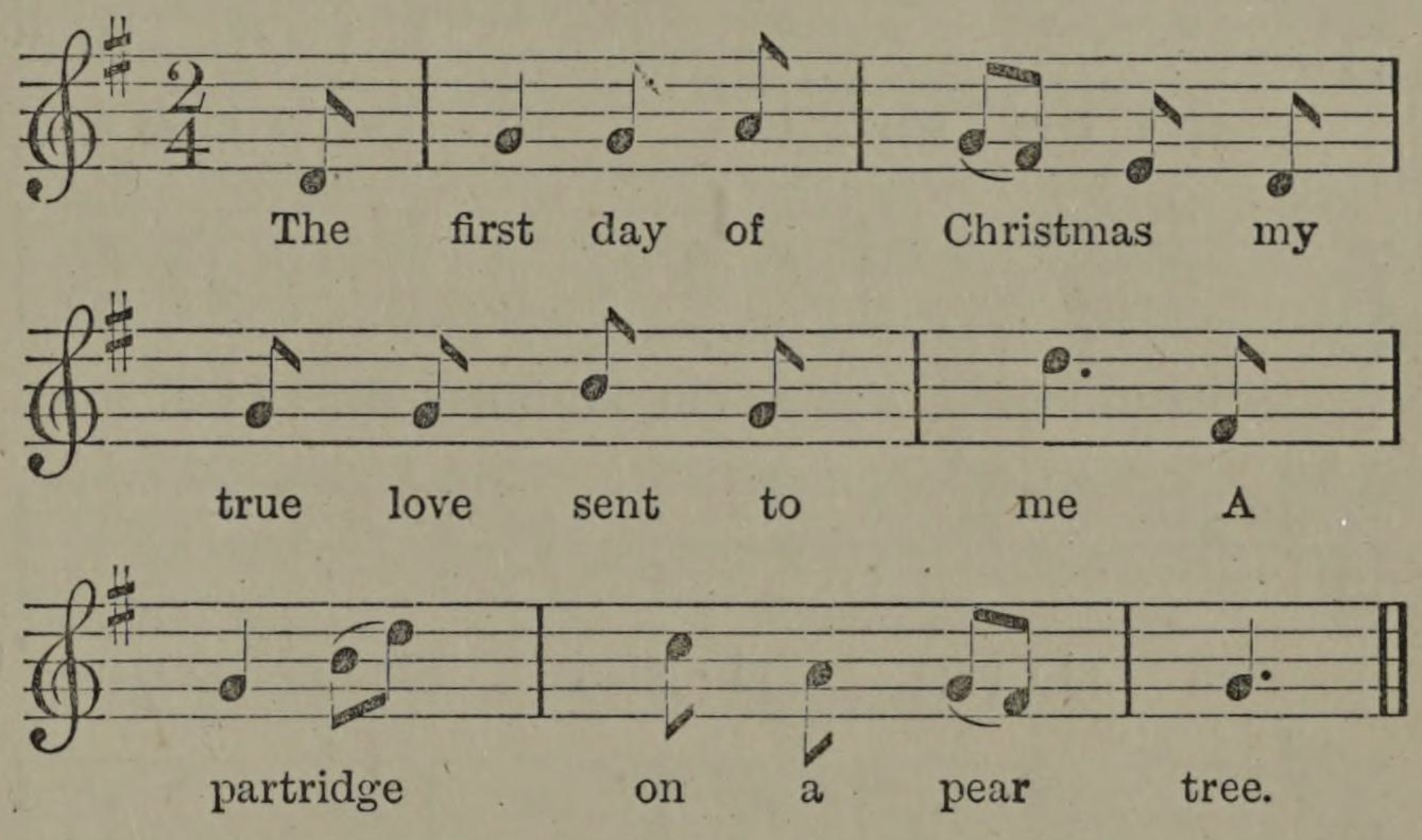
"[C]ollected by the late Mr. John Bell, of Gateshead, about eighty years ago" [i.e. around 1808]

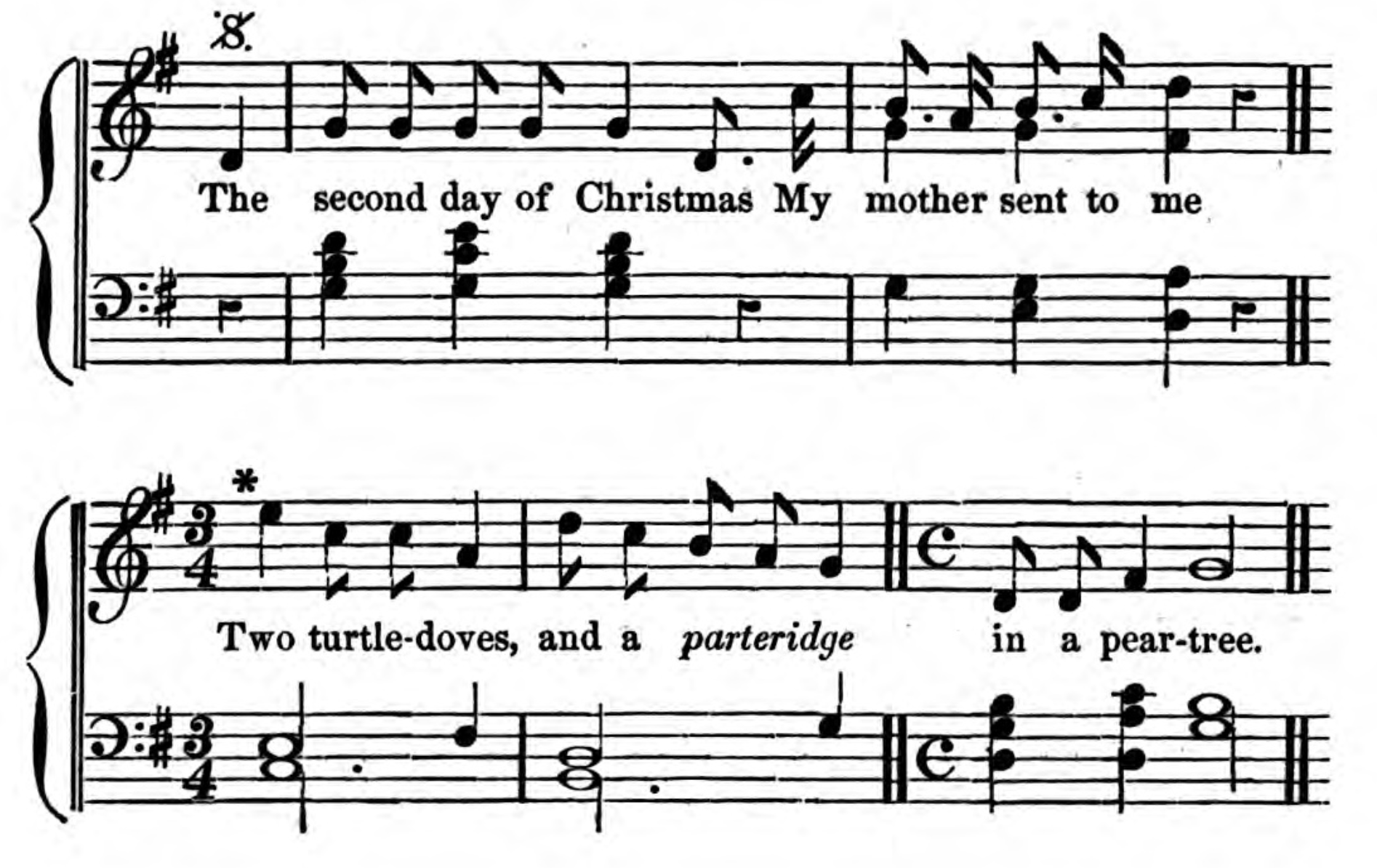
From Edward Rimbault's Nursery Rhymes, with the Tunes to which They Are Still Sung in the Nurseries of England (1846)

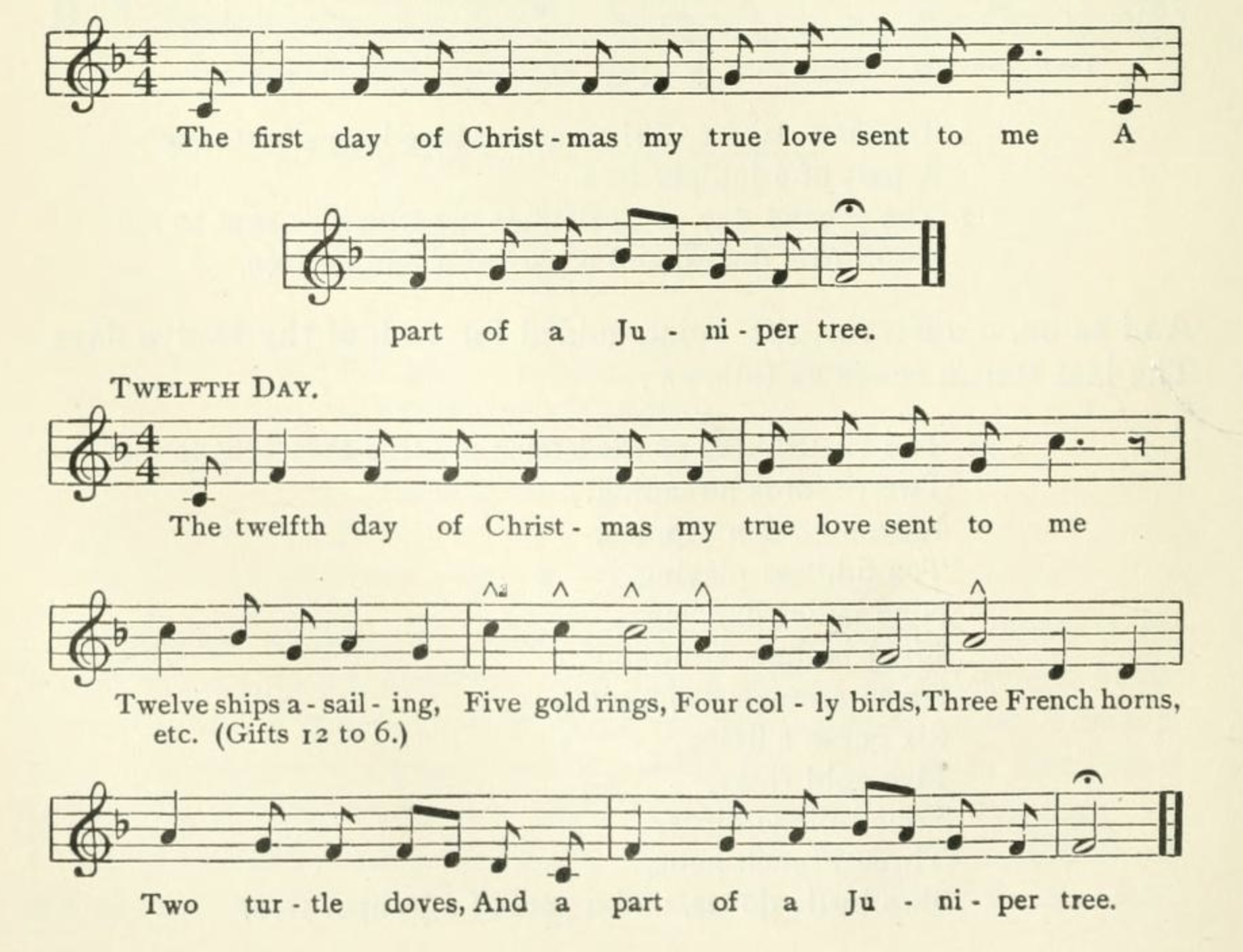
"[R]ecorded about 1875 by a lady of Providence, RI, from the singing of an aged man."

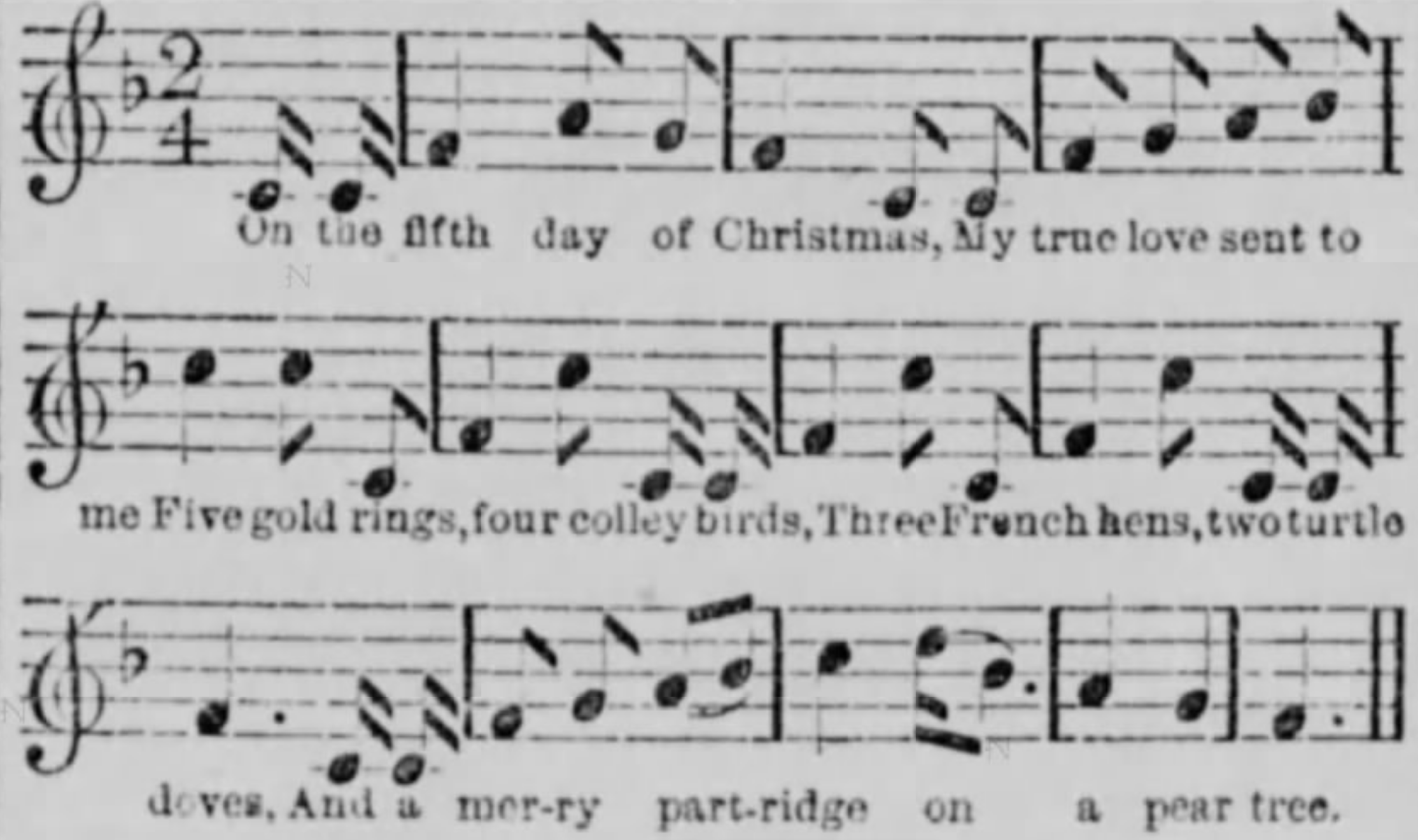
Current in "country villages in Wiltshire", according to an 1891 newspaper article

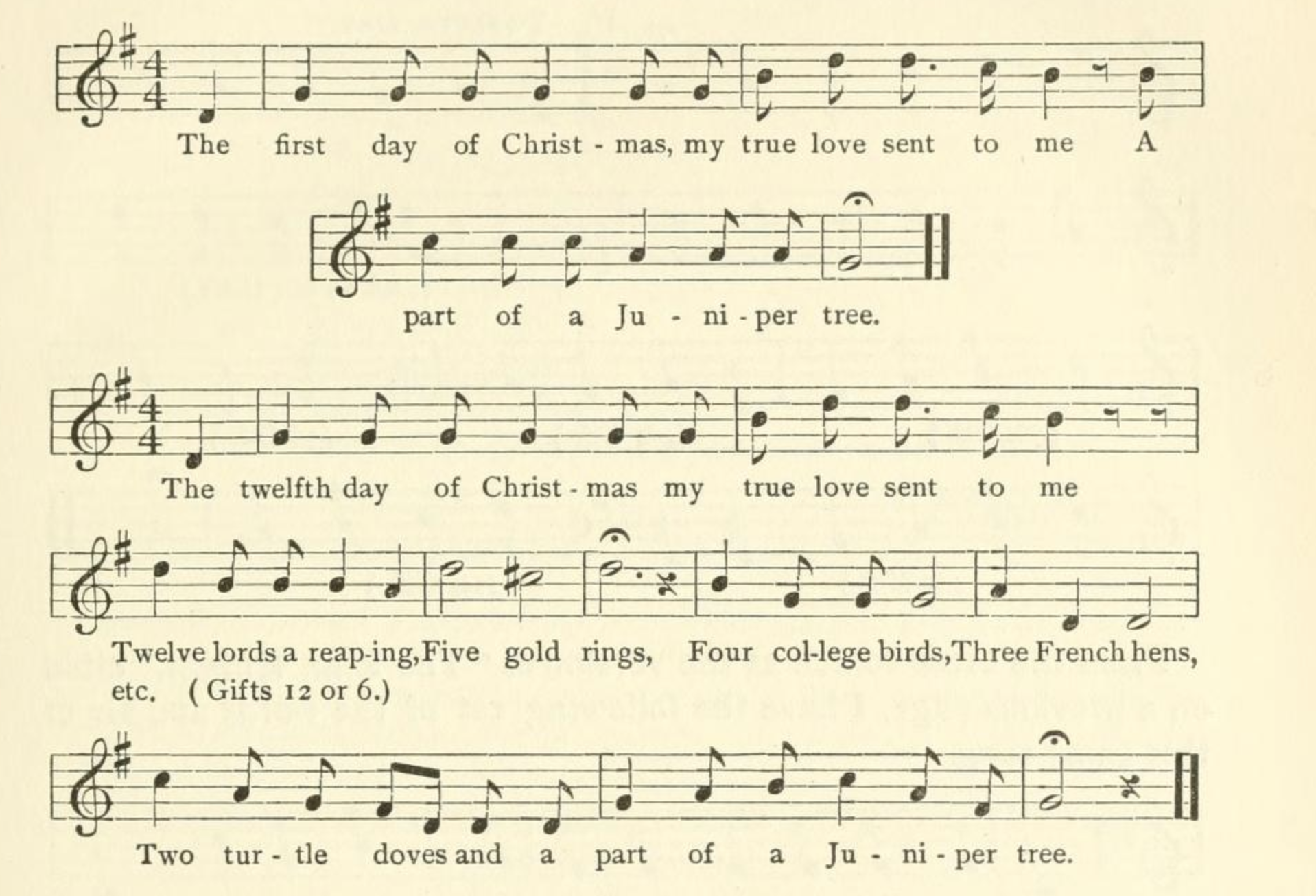
"[A]s sung by the Allens at the Homestead, Castle Hill, Medfield, Massachusetts, 1899"

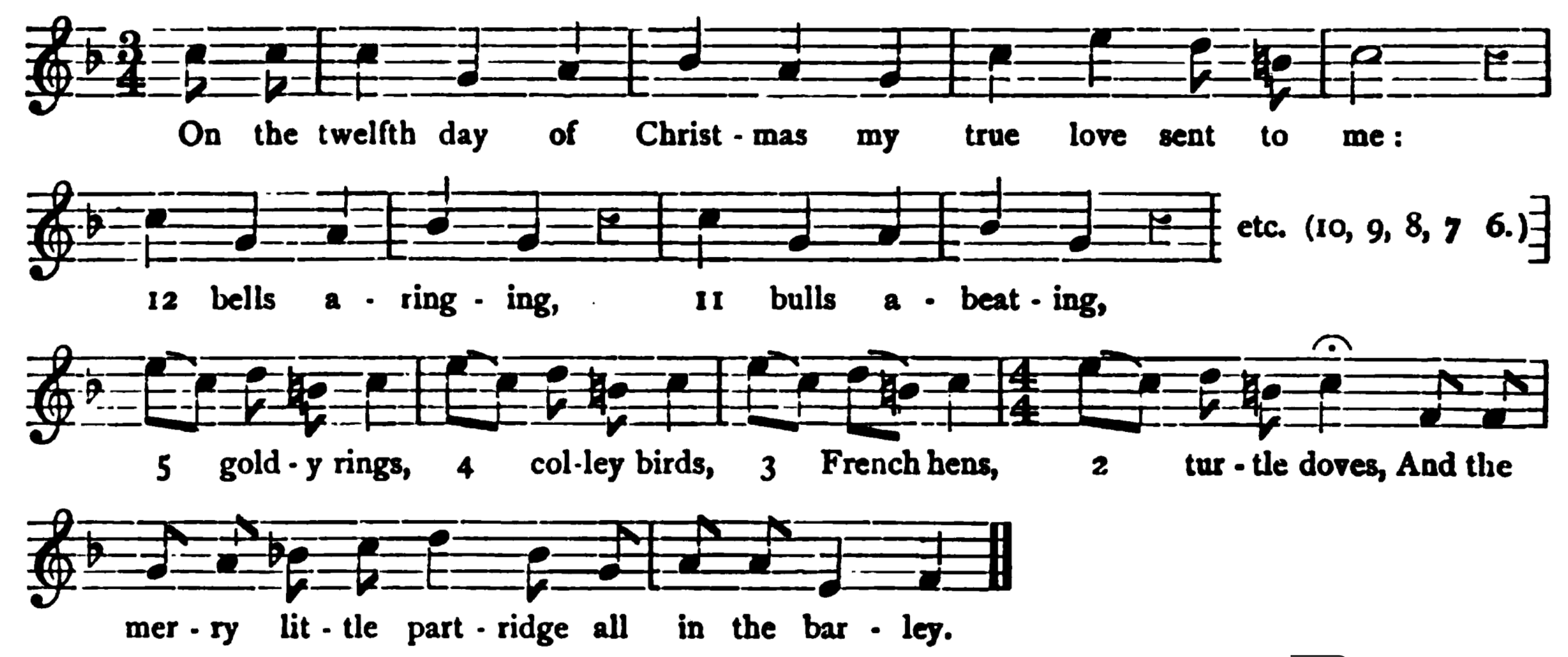
"[S]ung by Mr. George Wyatt, at West Harptree, Somerset, April 15th, 1904".

Several folklorists have recorded the carol using traditional melodies. Peter Kennedy recorded the Copper family of Sussex, England singing a version in 1955 which differs slightly from the common version, whilst Helen Hartness Flanders recorded several different versions in the 1930s and 40s in New England, where the song seems to have been particularly popular. Edith Fowke recorded a single version sung by Woody Lambe of Toronto, Canada in 1963, whilst Herbert Halpert recorded one version sung by Oscar Hampton and Sabra Bare in Morgantown, North Carolina. One interesting version was also recorded in 1962 in Deer, Arkansas, performed by Sara Stone; the recording is available online courtesy of the University of Arkansas.

== Parodies and other versions ==
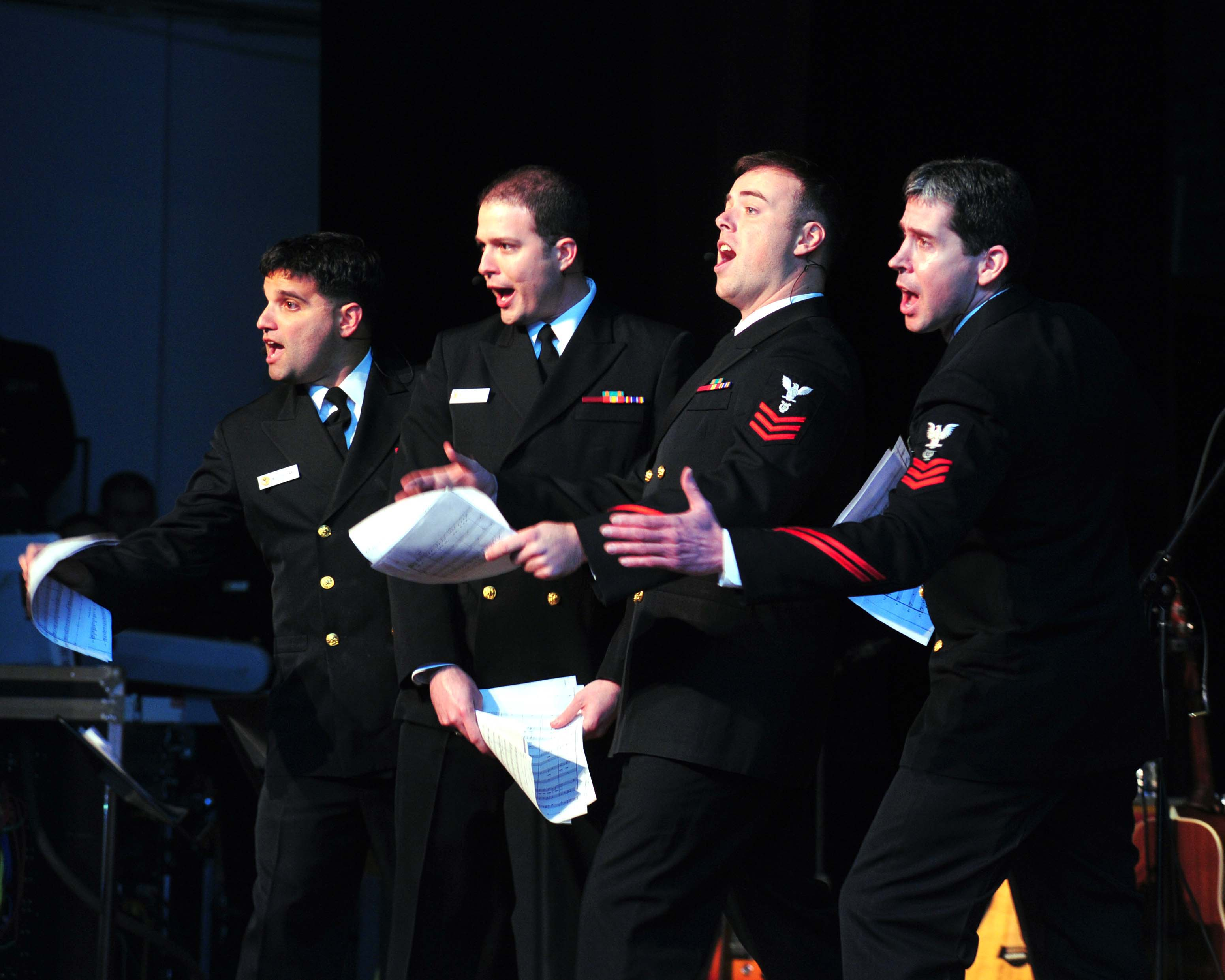
Members of the Navy Sea Chanters sing their comedy version of "The Twelve Days of Christmas" on 4 December 2009, at the Wallace Theater, Ft. Belvoir, Virginia.

- Bing Crosby and the Andrews Sisters recorded the traditional version of this song on 10 May 1949 for Decca Records.
- Perry Como recorded a traditional version of "Twelve Days of Christmas" for RCA Victor in 1953, but varied the lyrics with "eleven lords a leaping", "ten ladies dancing", and "nine pipers piping". The orchestrations were done by Mitchell Ayres.
- Advertising-based snippets of a parody of the song show up in Stan Freberg's 1958 "Green Chri$tma$".
- The Ray Conniff Singers recorded a traditional version in 1962, appearing on the album We Wish You a Merry Christmas.
- Allan Sherman released two different versions of "The Twelve Gifts of Christmas". Sherman wrote and performed his version of the classic Christmas carol on a 1963 TV special that was taped well in advance of the holiday. Warner Bros. Records rushed out a 45 RPM version in early December.
- Alvin and the Chipmunks covered the song for their 1963 album Christmas with The Chipmunks, Vol. 2.
- The illustrator Hilary Knight included A Firefly in a Fir Tree in his Christmas Nutshell Library, a boxed set of four miniature holiday-themed books published in 1963. In this rendition, the narrator is a mouse, with the various gifts reduced to mouse scale, such as "nine nuts for nibbling" and "four holly berries". Later released separately with the subtitle A Carol for Mice.
- Frank Sinatra and his children, Frank Sinatra Jr., Nancy Sinatra, and Tina Sinatra, included their own version of "The Twelve Days of Christmas" on their 1968 album, The Sinatra Family Wish You a Merry Christmas.
- Fay McKay, an American musical comedian, is best known for "The Twelve Daze of Christmas", a parody in which the gifts were replaced with various alcoholic drinks, resulting in her 1971 performance becoming increasingly inebriated over the course of the song.
- Sears put out a special Christmas coloring book with Disney's Winnie the Pooh characters in 1973 featuring a version of the carol focusing on Pooh's attempts to get a pot of honey from a hollow honey tree, with each verse ending in "and a hunny pot inna hollow tree".
- Jasper Carrott performed "Twelve Drinks of Christmas" in 1978 where he appears to be more inebriated with each successive verse. This was based on Scottish comedian Bill Barclay's version.
- The Muppets and singer-songwriter John Denver performed "The Twelve Days of Christmas" on the 1979 television special John Denver and the Muppets: A Christmas Together. It was featured on the album of the same name. The song has been recorded by the Muppets five different times, featuring different Muppets in different roles each time.
- A Māori/New Zealand version, titled "A Pukeko in a Ponga Tree", written by Kingi Matutaera Ihaka, appeared as a picture book and cassette recording in 1981.
- SCTV characters Bob & Doug McKenzie (Rick Moranis and Dave Thomas) released a "hoser" version on their spin-off album Great White North in 1982. The song only goes to the eighth day, with the gifts being (in descending order) eight comic books, seven packs of smokes, six packs of two-four [cases of 24 beers], five golden toques, four pounds of back bacon, three French toast, two turtlenecks, and a beer in a tree. During the song's outro, Bob bemoans Doug for not getting donuts, interjecting "You coulda gone down to, like, the good donut shop where if you buy a dozen [donuts], you get another one free and then, been thirteen for the thirteen days of Christmas."
- Irish actor Frank Kelly recorded "Christmas Countdown" in 1982 in which a man named Gobnait O'Lúnasa receives the 12 Christmas gifts referenced in the song from a lady named Nuala. As each gift is received, Gobnait gets increasingly upset with the person who sent them, as said gifts wreak havoc in the house where he lives with his mother. This version charted in both Ireland (where it reached number 8 in 1982) and the UK (entering the UK chart in December 1983 and reaching number 26). The song peaked at number 15 in Australia in 1984.
- "The Twelve Days of Christmas" is a 1987 Christmas song by The Lettermen will be single length 4:09 or 4:10 from the 1987 album It Feels Like Christmas and re-released again on 2013 by MVD Records.
- American rock and roll radio on-air personality Bob Rivers made a version of the song, "The Twelve Pains of Christmas" (from Twisted Christmas, 1988), replacing the traditional gifts with a list of hassles associated with Christmas, such as installing decorative lighting, or going shopping for gifts.
- Apo Hiking Society made their own cover version titled "12 Days of Pinoy Krismas" in 1991.
- The Twelve Days of Christmas (TV 1993), an animated tale which aired on NBC, features the voices of Marcia Savella, Larry Kenney, Carter Cathcart, Donna Vivino and Phil Hartman.
- In Hawaii, "The Twelve Days of Christmas, Hawaiian Style", with the words by Eaton Bob Magoon Jr., Edward Kenny, and Gordon N. Phelps, is popular. It is typically sung by children in concerts with proper gesticulation and a recording was released by Pure Heart in 1999.
- Phineas and Ferb released a Holiday Favorites album in 2010 featuring a parody of the song including gifts inspired by the character who sings each day. Several of the gifts reference the gifts said characters wanted in Phineas and Ferb Christmas Vacation, one of the show’s holiday specials.
- The video game StarCraft: Broodwar released a new map named Twelve Days of StarCraft with the song which was adopted a new lyric featured units from the game by Blizzard on 23 December 1999. In 2013, CarbotAnimations created a new web animation, StarCraft's Christmas Special 2013 the Twelve Days of StarCrafts, with the song which was played in the map Twelve Days of Starcraft.
- VeggieTales parodied "The Twelve Days of Christmas" under the title "The 8 Polish Foods of Christmas" in the 1996 album A Very Veggie Christmas. It was later rerecorded as a Silly Song for the episode The Little Drummer Boy in 2011.
- A special Creature Comforts orchestral arrangement of "The Twelve Days of Christmas" was made by British animator Nick Park and Aardman Animations. Featuring different animals discussing or trying to remember the lyrics of the song, it was released on Christmas Day 2005.
- Christian rock band Relient K released a recording of the song on their 2007 album Let It Snow, Baby... Let It Reindeer. This version known for its slightly satirical refrain: "What's a partridge? What's a pear tree? I don't know, so please don't ask me. But I can bet those are terrible gifts to get."
- A program hosted by Tom Arnold, The 12 Days of Redneck Christmas, which takes a look at Christmas traditions, premiered on CMT in 2008. The theme music is "The Twelve Days of Christmas".
- A version by Crayola was made in 2008 titled The 64 Days of Crayola.
- In the 2012 12 Disasters of Christmas movie, the song has actually been created by the Mayas to ensure that a prophecy of the end of the world be foretold among Europeans even after the destruction of the Mayas' civilization.
- In Operation N.A.U.G.H.T.Y., a holiday episode of Codename: Kids Next Door, when Elfa force (an elf-themed parody of the X-Men) find themselves unable to defeat the KND they summon their most powerful weapon, which is dropping the presents from the song on top of their enemies, often in visual pun style, like having the "Pipers piping" being plumbers with pipes, the "calling birds" being flamingos inside phone booths and the "partridge on a pear tree" being Lucy Partridge.
- Shannon Chan-Kent, as her character of Pinkie Pie from My Little Pony: Friendship Is Magic, sings her own version of the song on the 2015 album My Little Pony: It's a Pony Kind of Christmas.
- There is a Bluey board book of the 12 Days of Christmas, published November 2022, based on the character Verandah Santa from Season 1, Episode 52, which aired in December 2019.
- With reference to President Trump's impeachment just before Christmas 2019, the Washington International Chorus performed the 12 Days of Christmas carol, with specially adapted lyrics by BBC News.
- Casts of Bubble Gang made their own 2025 parody version titled "12 Days of Kurakot".

== Total number and cost of gifts ==
Assuming the gifts are repeated in full in each round of the song, the persona's true love sends them a total of 364 items by the twelfth day. The number of gifts received on each day is the sum of all integers up to n, known as a triangular number, expressed by $\frac{\left(n\right)\left(n+1\right)}{2}$. The number of gifts received in total is the sum of n triangular numbers, known as a tetrahedral number, expressed by $\frac{\left(n\right)\left(n+1\right)\left(n+2\right)}{3\cdot2}$. The former can be imagined as each number stacked up in a triangle, while the latter can be imagined as each triangle stacked up in a pyramid.

Over the years, media creators have been using the motif of 364 Christmas gifts to humorous effect:

- 1955: Wendy Toye directed On the Twelfth Day..., a British live action comedy short film wherein she also played the character of Miss Tilly. In Edwardian England, Miss Tilly's life becomes chaotic during the twelve days of Christmas as her boyfriend, Mr. Truelove, gives her hundreds of gifts; the short film ends with Miss Tilly and Mr. Truelove becoming engaged and flying away in his hot air balloon and her butler moving out of her crowded house. Even though animals were used in the making of On the Twelfth Day..., the swans were replaced with forty-two "boys a-singing".
- 1972: Jenny Overton wrote The Thirteen Days of Christmas, an English children's novel that doubles as the author's take on the origins of the carol. The main plot of Overton's novel takes place during the holy days of Christmas, beginning on 25 December (Christmas Day) and ending on 6 January (Epiphany); during the first twelve days, the fairytale-obsessed Annaple Kitson's merchant boyfriend, Francis Vere, sends her birds, pear trees, rings, fresh milk, and entertainers, her mood changing from delight to frustration. With her father and neighbours enjoying the spectacle, it is Annaple's younger siblings who had given Francis ideas so they can marry her off and no longer have to deal with her strict rules and bad cooking.
- 1977: Brian Sibley wrote an English black comedy radio broadcast titled ...And Yet Another Partridge in a Pear Tree. In their letters, a woman named Cynthia Bracegirdle (Penelope Keith) and her solicitors respond to her boyfriend, Algernon Fotherington-Smythe, whose sending her of the gifts drives her to suicide and instructing the solicitors to return all the assorted livestock and trafficked humans to him.
- 1988: Irene Trivas retold the Christmas carol as a children's book titled Emma's Christmas. A prince falls for a farmer's daughter named Emma, but she refuses to become a princess. For twelve days, the prince sends Emma animals, gold rings, and his servants until he has nothing left. Emma eventually marries the prince and makes him a farmer.
- 1999: the final track of American singer Natalie Cole's album The Magic of Christmas is her cover of The Twelve Days of Christmas which ends with her adding up all 364 gifts and moving out of her crowded home.
- 2016: in the British animated comedy short film The 12 Days of Christmas - A Tale of Avian Misery, a 21st century woman (Phoebe Waller-Bridge) narrates of the stress and troubles she endures when her boyfriend sends her all the gifts mentioned in the carol; the film ends with the narrator breaking up with her boyfriend and annually spending Christmas in the tropics to avoid receiving unwanted gifts.

PNC Christmas Price Index

Since 1984, the cumulative costs of the items mentioned in the Frederic Austin version have been used as a tongue-in-cheek economic indicator. This custom began with and is maintained by PNC Bank. Two pricing charts are created, referred to as the Christmas Price Index and The True Cost of Christmas. The former is an index of the current costs of one set of each of the gifts given by the True Love to the singer of the song "The Twelve Days of Christmas". The latter is the cumulative cost of all the gifts with the repetitions listed in the song. The people mentioned in the song are hired, not purchased. The total costs of all goods and services for the 2023 Christmas Price Index is US$46,729.86, or US$201,972.18 for all 364 items. The original 1984 cost was $12,623.10. The index has been humorously criticised for not accurately reflecting the true cost of the gifts featured in the Christmas carol.

== Computational complexity ==
In the famous article The Complexity of Songs, Donald Knuth computes the space complexity of the song as a function of the number of days, observing that a hypothetical "The $m$ Days of Christmas" requires a memory space of $O\left(\sqrt{n/\log n}\right)$ as $m\to\infty$ where $n$ is the length of the song, showing that songs with complexity lower than $O(\sqrt{n})$ indeed exist. Incidentally, it is also observed that the total number of gifts after $m$ days equals $m^3/6 + m^2/2 + m/3$.

In 1988, a C program authored by Ian Phillipps won the International Obfuscated C Code Contest. The code, which according to the judges of the contest "looked like what you would get by pounding on the keys of an old typewriter at random", takes advantage of the recursive structure of the song to print its lyrics with code that is shorter than the lyrics themselves.

== See also ==
- List of Christmas carols
