= Bob Rivers =

American radio host and musician (1956–2025)

- Born: Robert Rivers; July 7, 1956; Branford, Connecticut, U.S.
- Died: March 11, 2025 (aged 68); New Hampshire, U.S.
- Occupations: Radio host; musician
- Years active: 1970–2015
- Spouse: Lisa Rivers
- Children: Keith Rivers, Andrew Rivers
- Website: bobrivers.com

Robert Rivers (July 7, 1956 – March 11, 2025) was an American rock and roll radio on-air personality in the Pacific Northwest, as well as a prolific producer and songwriter of parody songs, most famous for his Christmas song parodies. His album Twisted Christmas was certified gold by the Recording Industry Association of America.

Rivers' last regular radio program, The Bob Rivers Show with Bob, Spike and Joe, was broadcast on Seattle oldies station KJR-FM until August 8, 2014, ending a 25-year run in the Seattle market.

Rivers played keyboards for a cover band affiliated with the show, Spike and the Impalers, until 2015.

== Early life ==
Rivers was born in Branford, Connecticut, on July 7, 1956, and raised as a Catholic. On the air, he occasionally referred to the work ethic and competitive streak he learned from his parents. (His father was the head of a utility company.) He was the eldest of eight children in his family.

He knew from an early age that he wanted to be on radio. At the age of 15, he released a bootleg AM broadcast from the basement of his family's home (a prank which his mother put a stop to). He also started a high-school radio show. He got his first paying radio job when he was 16, but reputedly was fired for playing too much Led Zeppelin.

== On the air in Connecticut ==
Rivers got his start as disc jockey in Connecticut, where he was heard on WAVZ, WNHC, WCDQ, WELI, WFIF, WCCC-FM, WWCO, and WLIS.

== WAAF Bob and Zip ==
Bob Rivers spent almost six years at WAAF in Worcester, Massachusetts (in the Boston market), as part of their successful Bob and Zip morning show with fellow on-air personality Peter "Zip" Zipfel.

During his tenure with WAAF, Rivers started producing parody and novelty songs, both for the station and for the KATZ/Newcity "American Comedy Network", a radio syndication service that provided comedy material to local U.S. and Canadian radio stations. One of the first parodies he produced was "Breakin' Up Is Hard On You", about the lawsuit and the resulting Bell System divestiture, the court ordered split up of U.S. telecommunications company AT&T's Bell System. The song was sung to the tune of Neil Sedaka's #1 1962 hit "Breaking Up Is Hard To Do" and peaked at #70 on the Billboard Hot 100 pop music chart. He followed it up with "Just a Big Ego," a parody of David Lee Roth's version of "Just a Gigolo". It went on to be included on Volume 2 of The Rhino Brothers Present the World's Worst Records and had a music video produced by Steve Rotfeld for Bob Uecker's Wacky World of Sports.

In 1987, Rivers released Twisted Christmas, which contained the Christmas music radio hit "Twelve Pains of Christmas", a parody of the holiday standard "The Twelve Days of Christmas". Twisted Christmas was certified a gold record.

== WIYY "98 Rock" ==
In the spring of 1988, at Baltimore radio station "98 Rock" WIYY-FM, as a lead morning show personality between 1987 and 1989, Bob Rivers gained national attention for an 11-day, on-the-air marathon during a Baltimore Orioles losing streak. He vowed to remain on the air until the Orioles won a game. He kept his vow and became a local celebrity among Orioles fans for his pledge. During the marathon, he took naps only during songs and started to develop health complications from the lack of sleep.

During his time at 98 Rock, he and WIYY radio collaborated with Sheffield Recording Studios to continue his campaign of Twisted Tunes.

In just under two years after joining WIYY, Rivers increased the station's morning show's ratings by about 65 percent.

A few weeks before Rivers was fired from WIYY, he met James (later "Spike") O'Neill, who was working at a used car dealership. O'Neill's father owned the dealership and advertised on the show, so Spike objected to Rivers's song "Hyundai, Hyundai (Can't Trust That Car)," a parody of Monday, Monday by The Mamas & the Papas. Rivers met Spike to test-drive a Hyundai, and Spike either "talked his way" into an unpaid internship on the show or, in his own words, "[Rivers] had taken them [WIYY] from worst to first and they offered him an insulting pay increase to renew. He went public with their alleged insult and at that point they took him off the air for the rest of his term. He met me and invited me in as an intern. When he left, he thought enough of me to ask me to join him."

== KISW Twisted Radio ==
Arriving at Active Rock radio station KISW-FM in Seattle in 1989, Rivers debuted a morning show with fellow radio host Sean Donahue, also from Baltimore. Their chief rival was the station KXRX. Rivers brought Spike O'Neill with him; Spike served as sportscaster, writer, and impressionist. They spent "six weeks of 14-hour days doing production and brainstorming and writing" before their first show on air.

Rivers released a second album of humorous holiday-themed music in 1993 entitled I Am Santa Claus (the title track was a parody of Black Sabbath's song Iron Man). Later, three other Christmas-themed albums were released: More Twisted Christmas (1997); Chipmunks Roasting On an Open Fire (2000); and White Trash Christmas (2002).

Bob Rivers and his Twisted Radio show also produced many non-holiday parodies covering such topics as pop culture, politicians, and the various sports teams and players in the Seattle area. These "Twisted Tunes" could be heard for free on his website. CD compilation albums are also available.

Rivers claims that more Twisted Tunes were written about the 1994 O. J. Simpson murder case than about any other individual; an example is the Twisted Tune "White Ford Bronco" (based on the 1955 song "Hot Rod Lincoln"; "Bronco" appears on the Twisted Christmas Boxed Set). Rivers has said that there might have been more Twisted Tunes sung about the Seattle Seahawks and Super Bowl XL. Rivers and his colleagues have guessed that his most famous Twisted Tune based on a pop song is "What if God Smoked Cannabis?", based on the 1995 Joan Osborne hit "One of Us". (This Rivers parody is often incorrectly attributed to "Weird Al" Yankovic or the Cranberries.)

In 1999, Rivers wrote a "twisted tune" song called "Kosovo", a parody of the Beach Boys hit song "Kokomo", about the Kosovo War. While earning many fans, the song also gained international attention and some controversy when it was used in 2005 by some Norwegian peacekeepers in Kosovo to make a music video.

In late 1999, the Seattle Post-Intelligencer noted that, after 10 years at the station, Rivers had the longest tenure of any radio personality in the local market.

Rivers and his cast sat out a year's non-compete period when their contract with KISW ran out.

== KZOK The Bob Rivers Show ==
In September 2001, the cast and show moved to KZOK, where it played through September 30, 2010. O'Neill was added to the show for a slate of talents that include vocal impersonations (as of Rush Limbaugh, Bill Clinton, and William Shatner, for example) and improvisation. The producer was Mike Jones; Arik Korman, a 2001 Visionary Award winner, joined the show as director in 2002; news and comedic commentary were provided by Maura Gallucci and, for a few years, Kaci Aitchison (who also is a singer with Spike and the Impalers).

The Bob Rivers Show was simulcast on Portland, Oregon's "1980s Rock Hits" radio station KVMX (now KXJM) "Mix 107.5" from March 20, 2006, until October 5, 2006, when the station dropped the morning show and switched to a Rhythmic Adult Contemporary format under the new branding "Movin' 107.5".

The cast would occasionally perform on-air skits, such as a famous parody of The Wizard of Oz in which Dorothy and the Wizard (the latter voiced by Spike) are trying to bring Brian Bosworth (a former Seattle Seahawks linebacker nicknamed "The Boz") back "home" to Seattle.

Another favorite was a contest between two callers-in to speak the roles of Scarlett O'Hara and Rhett Butler in the last lines of Gone with the Wind, beginning with the line "I'm leaving you, my dear. All you need now is a divorce and your dreams of Ashley can come true." Caller-in Kim played Scarlett to Spike's Rhett, and then caller-in Robert played Rhett to Spike's Scarlett. (Both contestants spoke with true Southern accents.) Spike ad-libbed many lines. For example, when Kim as Scarlett exclaimed, "Rhett! Rhett, where are you going?" Spike as Rhett replied, not the film's actual line, "I'm going back to Charleston, back where I belong," but: "I'm going to Rick's in Federal Way! Where I belong." (Rick's was a strip club.) When contestant Robert played Rhett and delivered the line, "Here, take my handkerchief," Spike as Scarlett used the handkerchief in a noisy and unladylike way. Listeners who called in got to vote on the better contestant, and Kim won the prize, probably in part because of her tearful, yearning cries of "Rhett! Rhett!" (Spike said in awe to her, "Seriously, did you just lose a puppy or something?") The prize was Fandango movie tickets.

In 2007, Spike O'Neill, in charge of sports news, persuaded former Seattle Seahawk placekicker Norm Johnson into an extended interview about Johnson's having saved the life of a woman, Virginia Sayson, who was trapped in an overturned car in a ditch in Silverdale, Washington. Rivers's and O'Neill's admiring and humorous interview, and Johnson's modest replies, turned the local-interest story into national news.

KZOK gained world renown when they partnered with World Vision International for what was to be a one-day "radiothon" to sponsor 400 children in poor nations. (Rivers credits director Arik Korman for "getting me started" with World Vision.) By the count of listeners who called or wrote to the station, they soon found sponsors for more than 3,000 children in Senegal, Ethiopia, the Dominican Republic, and other Third World countries.

Toward the end of this decade, the station added television cameras to the studio; streaming videos of interviews and musical performances could be seen on station websites. Mike Jones left the show when cameras were introduced.

Rivers's show left KZOK when he could not reach a contract deal with CBS, the owner of the station.

During December 2010, when the show members sat out their non-compete period from KZOK, Bob and his wife Lisa traveled to Bangladesh, where they spent the holiday helping to build schools for the poor in Dhaka.

== KJR-FM The Bob Rivers Show with Bob, Spike and Joe ==
The Bob Rivers Show ran on KJR-FM from April 1, 2011, to August 8, 2014, ending on the twenty-five year anniversary of Bob's first day on air in Seattle.

The Bob Rivers Show cast at 95.7 FM included Spike O'Neill, Joel "Downtown Joe" Bryant, newswoman Jodi Brothers, director Arik Korman, and producers Luciana Bosio and Pedro Bartes, a married couple who also contributed news and jokes on air.

=== Content ===
The Show provided a mix of classic rock music, comedy, discussion of current movies, sports news, local news (everything from bikini baristas to suburb-invading raccoons), celebrity news, and national news. Rivers, O'Neill and Bryant interviewed musicians, actors, comedians, authors, and, infrequently, local politicians. A friend of the show, attorney Shawn Alexander, frequently called in or was consulted upon all sorts of legal issues. O'Neill, Rivers, and Brothers provided running comedic commentary to the news stories.

Over the years, between the news and music segments, show members frequently discussed the lives of their families, with emphasis on the pleasures and perils of parenthood. Rivers and his wife, Lisa (whose one-time relationship with Steven Tyler sometimes provided conversational fodder), have two sons: Keith, a film-maker, and Andrew, a stand-up comedian; Andrew occasionally appeared on the show to discuss his career and to talk about growing up with his parents. Spike talked about how he and his wife, Melissa, steered their daughter Riann (pronounced Ryan) through her teenage years until she was hand-picked to become manager of a clothing/fashion store in New York, and about their much younger daughter, Darby. For years, Joe Bryant provoked laughter from callers-in by discussing how he and his wife, Kelli, allowed their school-age daughter, Emily-Jo, to eat whatever she wanted for dinner (chiefly chicken nuggets), while dealing with his own preference for overeating and drinking; when she was in high school, Joe spoke about Emily-Jo's interest in singing and her trip to Europe to sing in a choir.

In 2014, Joe, Bob and Spike provided almost daily news about a diet on which they all lost weight.

Downtown Joe was a favorite among listeners, and in 2014 he was given the role of hosting "The Warm-Up Show," a half-hour of chat (before Bob Rivers arrived) among Joe, Spike O'Neill, and Jodi Brothers, with guests ranging from their young radio interns to special guests including famous fishing guru Bill Herzog. Joe is locally known as an expert in fishing and other out-door activities.

Arik Korman and his wife Monique adopted a Korean boy, A.J., and Arik was frequently consulted for facts and science explanations. Luciana Bosio and Pedro Bartes provided another side of Americana by discussing their ongoing attempts to earn legal citizenship and Pedro's disinclination to drive; in early 2014, they both earned their permanent residence status with green cards.

The cast also occasionally discussed the children they sponsor through the aegis of World Vision International and had an annual drive to get listeners to sponsor children.

The show invited listeners to call in or text the show, in order to guess the answers to questions or to provide autobiographical anecdotes illustrative of a given topic, usually a topic in the news. (On May 8, 2013, an example of the latter was, "Have you ever participated in a practical joke that went wrong?") These segments were prefaced with a musical sting and the lyric "Is there anybody out there?" (from the Pink Floyd song of the same name). Prizes, such as tickets to upcoming musical events or Spike and the Impalers CDs, were given to callers-in who correctly guessed an answer (for example, "Which flavor of ice cream is more popular nationally, chocolate or vanilla?").

Show members also read aired advertisements for businesses local to the Seattle-Tacoma area.

Bob Rivers announced on July 28, 2014, that after 42 years on radio (33 years in morning zoo format for drive time listeners and 25 years in Seattle), the legendary host was stepping away from morning radio to pursue other projects. The finale on Friday, August 8, was attended by many family members and featured local musicians playing music one last time on the show. With the end of the show, Bob ended KJR's "Oldies" format; the station switched formats to a new show called "95.7 The Jet, Seattle's Variety From the 70's, 80's and More".

== Personal life ==
Rivers lived for many years in North Bend, Washington, with his wife, Lisa, where he gardened, tended to his bees and chickens, hiked, and recorded and played music in his home studio. To fight his fear of flying, Rivers learned to fly a plane, eventually bought his own, and became a private pilot.

He talked freely on the air about his hard-partying days, which ended when he entered rehab to treat his alcoholism in 1989, shortly after he moved to Washington.

Rivers was featured in an interview about his enjoyment of hiking in a 2014 summer issue of Washington Trails Magazine (a publication of the Washington Trails Association). The article was accompanied by five photographs of Rivers in the wilderness.

In November 2015, Seattle's KING-TV ran a story about Rivers's decision to sell his mansion, an estate that Rivers called "like something out of a fairy tale," for $2.3 million. He told the interviewer that he and wife Lisa plan to spend their time traveling and hiking: "It would be really nice to wander and explore a little bit."

=== Death ===
Rivers died in New Hampshire on March 11, 2025, after a three-year battle with esophageal cancer. He was 68.

=== Children ===
Rivers had two sons with his wife Lisa. The elder son, Keith Rivers (born February 2, 1983, in Worcester, Massachusetts) is a filmmaker. Their younger son, Andrew J. Rivers, is a stand-up comedian. Rivers' sons were featured on the I Am Santa Claus album in the track "The Kids."

Rivers' granddaughter—Keith's daughter—was born on August 8, 2014, the same day on which Rivers ended his radio show.

=== Plane theft ===
In 2009, Bob Rivers' Cessna 182 airplane was stolen from the airport, where it was based, by Colton Harris-Moore, who flew it to Yakima, Washington, landed the plane excessively hard and then fled the scene. The Cessna was declared a write-off by Rivers' insurance company. Rivers publicly condemned the theft and decried Harris-Moore's legend status, telling a news reporter, "I'm not a fan of the media frenzy because I don't like the whole cult hero thing, but if keeping it alive helps solve it, then I think it's worth it." He said on the radio, "I don't buy this folk-hero stuff. I was furious that something like this could happen. I really want him caught."

== Discography ==
=== Studio albums ===
Year	Album	Chart positions			
Year	Album	US Holiday	US	US Heat	US Country
1988	Twisted Christmas: Released: Label: Atlantic; Format: CD	19	–	–	–
1993	I Am Santa Claus: Released: Label: Atlantic; Format: CD	23	106	1	–
1994	Twisted Tunes 1994 - The Year in Review: Label: Atlantic	–	–	–	–
1997	More Twisted Christmas: Released: Label: Atlantic; Format: CD	–	–	13	–
2000	Chipmunks Roasting On an Open Fire: Released: Label: Atlantic; Format: CD	–	–	–	–
2002	White Trash Christmas: Released: Label: Atlantic; Format: CD	–	–	–	42

=== Compilations ===
Year	Album	Label
1994	Bob Rivers & Twisted Radio - Twisted Christmas Boxed Set [39 songs, some previously recorded] Includes: Twisted Christmas, I Am Santa Claus, Twisted Tunes 1994 - The Year In Review	Atlantic
1997	The Best of Christmas Tunes, Vol. 1	Atlantic
1997	The Best of Christmas Tunes, Vol. 2	Atlantic
1997	The Best of Twisted Tunes, Vol. 1	Atlantic
1997	The Best of Twisted Tunes, Vol. 2	Atlantic

== Film appearances ==
- Rivers, who was a science fiction fan, appeared as an extra in two episodes of Star Trek: Enterprise. The first was "Zero Hour", the third season finale, in which he appeared as an engineer alongside KZOK contest winner Amy Ulen. It was filmed April 29, 2004. The second was the series finale "These Are the Voyages... ", in which he appeared as a lieutenant.
- Rivers executive-produced a 7-minute documentary, Senegal, Africa: Through My Eyes, in 2009. It was directed by his son, Keith Rivers, and was made with the cooperation of World Vision International, whose efforts Rivers supports through occasional on-air broadcasts and by traveling, with some members of the Show, to countries such as Senegal, Malawi, and Bangladesh.

== Awards and honors ==
Rivers was twice voted Radio & Records' major market Rock Personality of the Year and has been Billboard's Radio Personality of the Week. At the Puget Sound Radio Broadcasters Association's annual awards banquet, he has won three People's Choice Awards for the Best Minute of the Year in Seattle Radio.

As an honor to celebrate his retirement from the show, the Seattle Mariners invited Rivers to throw the opening pitch at a game shortly after the show ended. Rivers insisted that Spike O'Neill and Joe Bryant be allowed to join him, as the three had worked together for so long.

== Critical acclaim for The Bob Rivers Show ==
The Seattle Post-Intelligencer wrote in 2005, "The mixture of talk (with such long-running cast members as Spike O'Neill and Joe Bryant), interviews and song parodies has consistently been one of the top-rated morning shows in the Seattle market." A Kitsap Sun columnist agreed: "As much as I treasure the information I can get from a couple of hours of NPR, I've found it's hard to pass up the mix of pop-culture info, topical news, off-the-wall humor and wealth of interviews I can get from Bob, Spike and Joe." KING-TV called Rivers "one of the Northwest's most popular personalities." Cynde Slater, a radio talent scout who hired Rivers to work at WAAF in 1985, said of Rivers's talent for making comedy out of topical subjects, "Bob has the ability to seize the opportunity. He does that better than anybody I've ever met."

A lengthy 2012 article in The Seattle Times praised Rivers for his wit and philosophy of perseverance.

The radio business is changing: Fewer stations, fewer jobs, fewer personalities. But for nearly 23 years, Seattle has been listening to lovable misfits Bob, Spike and "Downtown" Joe Bryant. Since April 1, 2011, after adding Seattle radio veteran Jodi Brothers to the mix, they've been cracking wise from 6 to 10 a.m. weekdays on KJR. The show is consistently one of the top three in its time period with the all-important 25-to-54 age group, along with The BJ Shea Morning Experience on KISW and Morning Edition on KUOW. It's the last remaining local talk/entertainment program on Seattle morning radio — others play music between gabbing, or focus on news...
Everything's rainbows and great ratings now, but the incredible longevity, the easy chemistry and current success of these radio survivors has been hard-earned. Their long, strange trip has included failed contract negotiations, cast changes, rehab, a lot of work and a recent health scare. But as the show and its players have evolved, there has also been laughter, love, support and family. Always, family — on and off the air.
