= White Trash Christmas =

Studio album by Bob Rivers
- Released: 2002
- Genre: Christmas
- Label: Atlantic

Bob Rivers chronology
Chipmunks Roasting On an Open Fire (2000)	White Trash Christmas (2002)

White Trash Christmas is the fifth and final Christmas album by Bob Rivers, released in 2002.

== Track listing ==
1. Aquaclaus - 2:47
  Straight parody of "Aqualung" as performed by Jethro Tull, describing the less savory aspects of being a department-store Santa Claus.
2. What If Eminem Did Jingle Bells? - 3:08
  A hardcore hip-hop interpretation of James Lord Pierpont's classic winter carol.
3. Osama Got Run Over by a Reindeer - 1:44
  Straight parody of "Grandma Got Run Over by a Reindeer" as performed by Elmo Shropshire; the song describes reindeer attacking terror leader Osama bin Laden.
4. White Trash Christmas - 2:46
  Parody of "White Christmas," performed by hillbillies (in the official music video, the Willie Nelson band, with Mickey Raphael as one of the three wise men) as a down-tempo country music piece.
5. Little Hooters Girl - 1:52
  Parody of "The Little Drummer Boy," performed by an all-male, a cappella chorus: M-pact. Song describes, in crude terms, the assets of a waitress at a Hooters restaurant.
6. Be Claus I Got High - 3:27
  Straight parody of "Because I Got High" as performed by Afroman.
7. Not So Silent Night - 1:55
  Fast-tempo Hard Rock rendition
8. Me and Mrs. Claus - 2:20
  Straight parody of "Me and Mrs. Jones" as performed by Billy Paul.
9. Have Yourself an Ozzy Little Christmas - 1:49
  Parody of "Have Yourself a Merry Little Christmas," sung by Bob Rivers. The song makes references to Ozzy Osbourne's antics and his then-popular reality show The Osbournes.
10. Merry Christmas Allah - 2:41
  Straight parody of "Merry Christmas Darling" as performed by The Carpenters, with an Islamic twist.
11. Shoppin' Around for a Christmas Tree - 1:51
  Straight parody of "Rockin' Around the Christmas Tree" as performed by Brenda Lee.
12. I'll Be Stoned for Christmas - 2:27
  Parody of "I'll Be Home for Christmas" as performed by Dean Martin, in an exaggerated homage to Martin's act as a drunk.

== Chart performance ==
Chart (2002)	Peak position
U.S. Billboard Top Country Albums	42
