= Fay McKay =

American jazz musician

Fay McKay (10 August 1930 – 4 April 2008) was an American entertainer, best known as a singer of comedic songs. She spent the majority of her career in Las Vegas, Nevada.

Born as Fayetta Gelinas in Manchester, New Hampshire, she won the 1951 Ted Mack Amateur Hour award and toured with the group. She was an opening act for Liberace and toured with Mickey Finn. While touring with Liberace, on one occasion when his trumpet player had called in sick, McKay stepped in to vocally perform the trumpet parts. She also performed shows at Las Vegas venues such as The Dunes the Landmark and the Stardust, and undertook independent touring as a headlining act.

She appeared on television talk shows, including The Mike Douglas Show, The Dick Cavett Show and The Merv Griffin Show, and took a voice acting role as a supporting character in Roger Corman's English edition of Galaxy Express 999 in 1980.

She released two albums: A-Live at the Dunes and Winter Favorites, as well as several variations of "The Twelve Daze of Christmas" as 45-RPM vinyl 7" singles, across various record labels over the years.

== The Twelve Daze of Christmas ==
She is most well-known for "The Twelve Daze of Christmas", a parody of the Christmas carol "The Twelve Days of Christmas" in which her true love gives her various forms of alcohol each day.

- 12 dry Martinis
- 11 Bloody Marys
- 10 dry Manhattans
- 9 Margaritas
- 8 sweet Old Fashioneds
- 7 Johnnie Walkers
- 6 Cuba Libres
- 5 dry Rob Roys
- 4 Old Fitzgeralds
- 3 Old Crows
- 2 Cutty Sarks
- And a Partridge in a Pear Tree

As the song progresses, McKay varies the wording and pronunciation to simulate becoming progressively more inebriated. As examples, at various points in the song "Cuba Libres" becomes "Tuba Libas", "margaritas" becomes 'Roto-Rooters", "Cutty Sarks" becomes "City Parks", "martinis" becomes "martoonis", and the "partridge in a pear tree" becomes "The Surrey With the Fringe on Top". She also switches songs which include "A Tree in the Meadow" and "Battle Hymn of the Republic".

== Death ==
McKay died in Las Vegas, Nevada, aged 77, from undisclosed causes.
