= Rated X Mas =

Matt Rogers' Rated X Mas

Studio album by Matt Rogers
- Released: September 16, 1997
- Genre: Parody music
- Length: 19:07
- Label: Party on Parody Productions

Rated X Mas (often stylized as Rated Xmas) is a Christmas music parody album by Matt Rogers. The songs on the album are parodies of popular Christmas songs, but with graphic and sexual lyrics.

== Reception ==
Rated X Mas ratings
Review scores
Source	Rating
Allmusic	2/5 stars

Rated X Mas has received mostly mixed reception. Todd Totale of Glorious Noise gave the album a negative review, declaring it “the worst Christmas album ever made”.

Despite this, the album has garnered a cult following, especially on websites such as YouTube, where many uploads of the album's tracks exist (perhaps the most notable example being "Suck on My Cock").

== Legal controversy ==
In May 2000, several record labels, including Warner Music Group, sued the album's distributor, Party on Parody Productions, alleging that the album infringed on the copyright of the Christmas songs being spoofed. In December, the case was settled, with the album being pulled from shelves and all remaining unsold copies being forfeited and destroyed. However, in December 2023, the album was re-released digitally to streaming services. The album was re-issued again in December 2025.

== Track listing ==
Rogers performed vocals on "I Saw Mommy Fucking Santa Claus", "Suck on My Cock", and "I Love to Choke My Chicken with My Hand", while an uncredited female vocalist performs the other songs (although Rogers provides additional voices in "Drunken Santa's Coming to Town", "Rudolph the Deep Throat Reindeer", and "Frosty the Pervert"). The re-releases to digital and streaming services rearranged the track listing and shortened "I Love to Choke My Chicken with My Hand" to "I Love to Choke My Chicken".

Rated X Mas – physical CD
No.	Title	Length
1.	"Drunken Santa's Coming to Town" (parody of "Santa Claus Is Coming to Town")	2:03
2.	"I Saw Mommy Fucking Santa Claus" (parody of "I Saw Mommy Kissing Santa Claus")	2:42
3.	"Rudolph the Deep Throat Reindeer" (parody of "Rudolph the Red-Nosed Reindeer")	2:28
4.	"Suck on My Cock" (parody of "Jingle Bell Rock")	2:13
5.	"Frosty the Pervert" (parody of "Frosty the Snowman")	2:28
6.	"I Love to Choke My Chicken with My Hand" (parody of "Winter Wonderland")	2:57
7.	"Have Yourself a 1-900-Christmas" (parody of "Have Yourself a Merry Little Christmas")	2:08
8.	"Have a Pornographic Christmas" (parody of "Holly Jolly Christmas")	2:08
Total length:		19:07

Rated X Mas – 2023 digital download and streaming re-issue
No.	Title	Length
1.	"Suck on My Cock" (parody of "Jingle Bell Rock")	2:13
2.	"Frosty the Pervert" (parody of "Frosty the Snowman")	2:28
3.	"I Saw Mommy Fucking Santa Claus" (parody of "I Saw Mommy Kissing Santa Claus")	2:42
4.	"Drunken Santa's Coming to Town" (parody of "Santa Claus Is Coming to Town")	2:03
5.	"Have a Pornographic Christmas" (parody of "Holly Jolly Christmas")	2:08
6.	"Rudolph the Deep Throat Reindeer" (parody of "Rudolph the Red-Nosed Reindeer")	2:28
7.	"Have Yourself a 1-900-Christmas" (parody of "Have Yourself a Merry Little Christmas")	2:08
8.	"I Love to Choke My Chicken" (parody of "Winter Wonderland")	2:57
Total length:		19:07

Rated X Mas – 2025 digital download and streaming re-issue
No.	Title	Length
1.	"Suck on My Cock" (parody of "Jingle Bell Rock")	2:13
2.	"Frosty the Pervert" (parody of "Frosty the Snowman")	2:28
3.	"I Love to Choke My Chicken With My Hand" (parody of "Winter Wonderland")	2:57
4.	"Rudolph the Deep Throat Reindeer" (parody of "Rudolph the Red-Nosed Reindeer")	2:28
5.	"I Saw Mommy Fucking Santa Claus" (parody of "I Saw Mommy Kissing Santa Claus")	2:42
6.	"Have a Pornographic Christmas" (parody of "Holly Jolly Christmas")	2:08
7.	"Have Yourself a 1-900-Christmas" (parody of "Have Yourself a Merry Little Christmas")	2:08
8.	"Drunken Santa's Coming to Town" (parody of "Santa Claus Is Coming to Town")	2:03
Total length:		19:07

== Release history ==
Release dates and formats for Rated X Mas
Release date	Format(s)	Label(s)	Ref.
September 16, 1997	CD	Party on Parody Productions	
December 12, 2023	Digital download; Streaming	—N/a	
December 16, 2025	Digital download; Streaming	—N/a	
