= Chipmunks Roasting On an Open Fire =

Chipmunks Roasting on an Open Fire

Studio album by Bob Rivers
- Released: 2000
- Genre: Christmas
- Label: Atlantic

Bob Rivers chronology
More Twisted Christmas (1997)	Chipmunks Roasting on an Open Fire (2000)	White Trash Christmas (2002)

Chipmunks Roasting on an Open Fire is the fourth Christmas album by Bob Rivers, and was released in 2000.

== Track listing ==
1. "The Twisted Chipmunk Song" (2:01)
  - parody of "The Chipmunk Song" as performed by Alvin and the Chipmunks featuring David Seville
2. "Chipmunks Roasting on an Open Fire" (3:19)
  - parody of "The Christmas Song" as performed by Nat King Cole
3. "The Angel"/"Who Put the Stump?" (3:27)
  - parody of "Who Put the Bomp?" as performed by Barry Mann, includes a spoken-word prelude in which a father fixes a live angel tree topper for his children
4. "Decorations" (2:18)
  - parody of "Good Vibrations" as performed by The Beach Boys
5. "Carol of the Bartenders" (1:38)
  - A public service announcement, performed by a mostly-female a cappella quartet to the tune from "Carol of the Bells," warning against driving under the influence. (The lyrics to the Alka-Seltzer jingle, "plop plop fizz fizz," are heard in the background.)
6. "Christmas Party Song" (1:43)
  - parody of "It's Christmas Time" (by Victor Young and Al Stillman) as performed by The Carpenters
7. "Christmas Money" (2:17)
  - parody of "Money (That's What I Want)" as performed by The Beatles
8. "Pokémon" (1:32)
  - parody of God Rest You Merry, Gentlemen
9. "Goin' Up to Bethlehem" (2:07)
  - parody of "Up Around the Bend" as performed by Creedence Clearwater Revival
10. "Homeless on the Holidays" (2:52)
  - parody of "Home for the Holidays" as performed by Perry Como
11. "He's So Jolly" (2:04)
  - parody of "Hello, Dolly!" as performed by Louis Armstrong
12. "Flu Ride" (2:46)
  - parody of "Sleigh Ride" as performed by The Carpenters
13. "Santa Claus Is Foolin' Around" (3:22)
  - parody of "Santa Claus Is Comin' to Town" as performed by Bruce Springsteen and the E Street Band
14. "Stumpmaster Remix" (2:57)
  - remix of "Who Put the Stump?"
