= Queen Emeraldas =

1978 manga

- Cover of the first Japanese manga volume

クィーン・エメラルダス (Kuīn Emerarudasu)
- Genre: Space opera, space western
- Manga
- Written by: Leiji Matsumoto
- Published by: Kodansha
- English publisher: NA: Kodansha USA
- Magazine: Weekly Shōnen Magazine
- Original run: 1978 – 1979
- Volumes: 4
- Original video animation
- Directed by: Yūji Asada (1–2); Shigenori Kageyama (3–4)
- Produced by: Kōki Okagawa; Shunji Sakai (1–2); Tomoyuki Imai (1–2); Shūkichi Kanda (1–2); Kōji Honda (3–4)
- Written by: Mugi Kamio
- Music by: Michiru Ōshima
- Studio: OLM (Note: Team Wasaki) (1–2); Multi-Access Company (3–4)
- Licensed by: NA: ADV Films
- Released: June 10, 1998 – December 18, 1999
- Runtime: 30–35 minutes (each)
- Episodes: 5 (Note: 4 regular episodes + 1 extra)

Queen Emeraldas (Japanese: クィーン・エメラルダス, Hepburn: Kwīn Emerarudasu) is a manga written and illustrated by Leiji Matsumoto, later adapted into a four-episode anime OVA of the same name. Queen Emeraldas is the story of the pirate spaceship, Queen Emeraldas, which is captained by the mysterious and beautiful Emeraldas, a strong and powerful privateer. Sometimes, the character Emeraldas is referred to as Pirate Queen Emeraldas.

== Plot ==
The storyline follows a young boy named Hiroshi Umino (海野広) who sneaks aboard a freighter in order to leave Earth. As the freighter is flying through space they are attacked by an Afressian ship bearing the Skull and Crossbones insignia. However, the train is saved by a mysterious and incredibly powerful spaceship (which also bears the insignia) and is able to make it to their destination, a desert planet with a Western atmosphere, complete with saloons and bar fights. The boy meets up with another stowaway, an old man, and becomes friends with him. He tells the old man that he came to the planet in order to become a stronger individual. He gets himself a job in a bar with the roughest reputation on the planet to prove himself.

When the attacking ship, led by Captain Eldomain (エルドメイン大佐), lands on the planet to search for whoever attacked him, Emeraldas appears to confront him, demanding that he remove the insignia from his ship; "Only two ships have the right to bear it!" In the second episode, after a final confrontation with Eldomain and later with Queen Baraluda (女王バラルーダ), of Arfess (アルフレス), Emeraldas presents Hiroshi with the Cosmo Dragoon once owned by Tochiro.

Another divergence from the manga takes place here when Emeraldas states that there are five Cosmo Dragoons in existence (hers and the ones owned by Tochiro, Captain Harlock, Tetsuro and Maetel), whereas in the manga there are only four. Later, Hiroshi Umino and his elderly friend visit a planet whose inhabitants have been forced out by a murderous cyborg. This cyborg killed one of the planet's inhabitants and drove his son mad. Umino meets the son and his sister and with their help and Emeraldas', he kills the oppressive cyborg.

While the story can stand on its own, independent of Matsumoto's other works, it mostly assumes that the viewer has seen the other Harlock titles, especially Galaxy Express 999 (the TV series and the films), which featured Maetel, Emeraldas' sister, but had the occasional appearance of Emeraldas (note: Maetel, for some reason in the English dub is referred to as Mataire). The story of Queen Emeraldas is set five years after the events of the final Galaxy Express 999 film and was designed to give Matsumoto's fans a further glimpse into what became of Emeraldas. However, of the other characters, most are only mentioned in passing, except for Captain Harlock who has a brief cameo appearance.

Queen Emeraldas first two episodes were produced by Oriental Light and Magic (OLM) and licensed for American distribution by ADV Films, being one of their earlier releases on the DVD format. Those two episodes also have regular runs on the Action Channel. In Japan, the remaining two episodes were co-produced by MAC (Multi Access Company) and were released the following year after the initial two, indicating that a separate contract (that is not yet forthcoming) would be required for anyone to license the concluding episodes of the story outside Japan.

== Cast ==
- Megumi Hayashibara as Hiroshi Umino
- Reiko Tajima as Emeraldas
- Kenichi Ogata as Lou Row
- Koichi Yamadera as Tochiro Oyama
- Makio Inoue as Captain Harlock

== Media ==
=== Manga ===
Leiji Matsumoto first published a one-shot in 1975 in the publisher Akita Shoten's magazine Princess. It began its distribution in Kodansha's Weekly Shōnen Magazine in 1978. It ended in 1979, and four collected volumes were released by Kodansha. Kodansha Comics licensed the series to be published in English in two large-format hardcover volumes; the first was released on July 26, 2016, while the second was published on July 25, 2017.

=== Anime ===
An original video anime adaptation was produced by OLM and Multi-Access Company and released in four episodes between 1998 and 1999. Half the series was dubbed into English and released by ADV Films on DVD in 1999.

No.	Title	Original release date
1	"Departure"	May 6, 1998
2	"Eternal Emblem"	October 7, 1998
3	"Friendship"	August 6, 1999
4	"Siren"	December 18, 1999
Extra	"Fantasy"	September 10, 1999

=== Other appearances ===
Emeraldas appeared in the 1978 Space Pirate Captain Harlock television series during flashbacks. She also had a guest appearance in the 1978 Galaxy Express 999 series. This episode, "Eternal Traveller Emeraldas", was later turned into an hour-long television special expanding on that story. She subsequently appeared as a supporting character in the film Arcadia of My Youth, where it is shown how she obtained her facial scar. She also makes brief appearances in Harlock Saga and Cosmo Warrior Zero. Her origin and youth is depicted in Maetel Legend.

As with Harlock and most other characters of the Leijiverse, Emeraldas' appearances in various stories cannot be applied to one consistent timeline. In the 1978 Galaxy Express 999 story, for example, one notable difference from her other depictions is that Emeraldas is suffering from an unknown illness. Her place as captain was taken over by a robot imposter while she was mostly confined to bed. The story suggests that she does not have much longer to live. This illness is alluded to in the recent manga where Emeraldas does not engage in much physical action due to her weakened condition. However, the OVA version is a fearsome combatant—as seen in her gravity saber duel with Queen Baraluda—and shows no sign of any such illness. In the original Captain Harlock series in episode 30 ("My Friend, My Youth"), Emeraldas is shown to have a younger brother, but no sister is ever mentioned. Opposed to that, no brother exists in Queen Emeraldas or any other movies or series of the franchise.
