= Captain Harlock (character) =

Fictional character

Harlock
- Space Pirate Captain Harlock character
- Harlock, as he appears in the Galaxy Express 999 film.
- First appearance: Space Pirate Captain Harlock (1977)
- Created by: Leiji Matsumoto
- Voiced by: Japanese; Makio Inoue (Space Pirate Captain Harlock, Arcadia of My Youth, Galaxy Express 999, Queen Emeraldas, Super Robot Wars T); Eiji Takemoto (Cosmo Warrior Zero, Gun Frontier); Kōichi Yamadera (Galaxy Express 999: Eternal Fantasy, DNA Sights 999.9, Space Pirate Captain Herlock: The Endless Odyssey); Shun Oguri (Space Pirate Captain Harlock); English; Lanny Broyles (Arcadia of My Youth); Michael McConnohie (Captain Harlock and the Queen of a Thousand Years, DNA Sights 999.9); Scott McNeil (Galaxy Express 999, Adieu Galaxy Express 999); Ken Webster (Queen Emeraldas); Matt Hoverman (Harlock Saga); Steven Blum (Cosmo Warrior Zero, Gun Frontier); Lex Lang (Space Pirate Captain Herlock: The Endless Odyssey); David Matranga (Space Pirate Captain Harlock, Galaxy Express 999: Eternal Fantasy)

In-universe information
- Aliases: Franklin Harlock, Jr. Francis Harlock, Jr. Phantom F. Harlock II; Herlock

Captain Harlock (Japanese: キャプテン・ハーロック, Hepburn: Kyaputen Hārokku; also known as "Captain Herlock" in the English release of Endless Odyssey and some Japanese materials) is a fictional character and the protagonist of the Space Pirate Captain Harlock manga series created by Leiji Matsumoto.

Harlock is the archetypical Romantic hero, a space pirate with an individualist philosophy of life. He is as noble as he is taciturn, rebellious, stoically fighting against totalitarian regimes, whether they be Earth-born or alien. In his own words, he "fight[s] for no one's sake... only for something deep in [his] heart". He does not fear death, and is sometimes seen wearing clothing with the number 42 on it. In Japanese culture, the number 42 is associated with death (the numbers, pronounced separately as "four two", sound like the word "shini"—meaning "dying/death"). He is a descendant of the Harlock clan, an ancient Germanic clan of pirate-knights based in Heiligenstadt.

The character was created by Leiji Matsumoto in 1977 and popularized in the 1978 television series Space Pirate Captain Harlock. Since then, the character has appeared in numerous animated television series and films, the latest of which is 2013's Space Pirate Captain Harlock.

== History ==
Though there are slight variations in each telling of Harlock's story, the essentials remain the same. Matsumoto presents a future (2977 AD) in which the Earth has achieved a vast starfaring civilization, but is slowly and steadily succumbing to ennui or despair, often due to defeat and subjugation by a foreign invader. Rising against the general apathy, Harlock denies defeat and leads an outlaw crew aboard his starship Arcadia to undertake daring raids against Earth's oppressors. Even though they have defeated Earth and devastated its peoples, the invaders are often presented in a sympathetic light, being shown as having some justification for their actions.

=== Space Pirate Captain Harlock (1978 TV series) ===
In Space Pirate Captain Harlock, the Captain's crew included the mysterious, alcohol-imbibing alien woman Miime, a robot, and a drunken doctor. The series presented a story arc in which a huge black metal sphere strikes Tokyo and ancient Mayan legends appear to be walking the Earth again. The invaders turn out to be the Mazone, a race of plant-based women who explored Earth in the mythic past and are now back to reclaim it. Only Harlock and his mismatched crew are brave and capable enough to face the enemy.

=== Captain Harlock – Mystery of the Arcadia ===
This 1978 short film is ostensibly a retelling of episode 13 of the 1978 series, "The Witch's Ocean Castle of Death". It consists primarily of recycled footage taken from this same episode, but presented in widescreen format. Some new alternate footage is added at the beginning of the story, and some soundtrack adjustments were made throughout.

=== Arcadia of My Youth ===
The Arcadia of My Youth feature film was released on July 28, 1982. The film, set in a different continuity from the original TV series, chronicles Harlock's beginnings as a space pirate and his acquisition of the spaceship Arcadia. The film also includes flashback material dealing with two of his 20th-century ancestors.

=== Endless Orbit SSX ===
Arcadia of My Youth was followed by 22 episodes of the TV series Endless Orbit SSX starting in October 1982. Its official French title is simply Albator, although it early became popular among French speakers as Albator 84 since it was first aired in France as of 1984 and the 1978 series had been formerly named in French exactly the same: Albator. The series dealt with Harlock and company's continuing struggle against the Illumidas occupying force, who still retained control of Earth at the end of the theatrical feature. Both film (Arcadia of My Youth) and second series (Endless Orbit SSX) feature a newly designed starship and lack most of the crew from the Space Pirate series, but are noteworthy for the presence of Emeraldas, a female counterpart to Harlock who originally appeared in a series of Matsumoto-penned graphic novels.

=== Harlock Saga ===
In the 1990s, Matsumoto released Harlock Saga, a mini-series based on Das Rheingold. The series recasts the Captain and his crew in roles with analogues in The Ring Cycle and pits them against a race of "gods" set on redesigning the universe to their liking.

=== Gun Frontier ===
Gun Frontier, a buddy comedy set in the American Old West, began broadcasting in TV Tokyo on March 28, 2002. The series follows Franklin Harlock Jr. and Tochiro Ōyama as they search for a lost clan of Japanese immigrants. In contrast to other works, Harlock appears here as Tochiro's sidekick.

=== Endless Odyssey ===
December 2002 saw the release of Space Pirate Captain Harlock: The Endless Odyssey, directed by Rintaro.

The story is set after the original TV series, with Harlock on a self-imposed exile and his crew either in jail or flying under the Jolly Roger. The series details Harlock's return and his round-up of the Arcadia crew for a fight against the Noo, a mysterious and ancient evil which has caused the Earth to disappear, and who use fear to conquer their foes. As nearly every part of this series is geared to be a sequel to the original Captain Harlock TV series, Endless Odyssey reintroduces Tadashi Daiba to the Arcadia.

=== Space Pirate Captain Harlock (2013 film) ===
Toei Animation produced a film adaptation of the manga in 2013, titled Space Pirate Captain Harlock. Toei developed the pilot for its planned computer-graphics remake of Space Pirate Captain Harlock manga and anime franchise in 2010. Mobile Suit Gundam UC author Harutoshi Fukui, Appleseed director Shinji Aramaki, Appleseed mechanical designer Atsushi Takeuchi, and Ninja Scroll character designer Yutaka Minowa worked on the new Space Pirate Captain Harlock pilot with Marza Animation Planet (formerly known as Sega Sammy Visual Entertainment). The official trailer/pilot was aired at the Kawaii-Kon Anime festival in Hawaii on April 17 of the same year, as a special presentation courtesy of director Shinji Aramaki. The film has the highest production budget ever at the equivalent of over 30 million U.S. dollars.

The film premiered in Japan on September 7, 2013. The film also premiered on Netflix under the title Harlock: Space Pirate with Japanese, Portuguese and Spanish audio and with English, Portuguese and Spanish subtitles, with some scenes cut from some versions.

=== Captain Harlock: Dimensional Voyage ===
In August 2014, to celebrate the 60th anniversary of his debut, Matsumoto launched the manga Captain Harlock: Dimensional Voyage, illustrated by Kōichi Shimahoshi, in the pages of Akita Shoten's Champion Red magazine. Dimensional Voyage is a retelling of the original 1978 Space Pirate Captain Harlock manga.

== Reception and cultural impact ==
Harlock has achieved notable popularity. In 1979, the character won the first annual Anime Grand Prix for favorite character. In 2006, Harlock and the characters of Galaxy Express 999 were recognized in the third set of "Anime Heroes and Heroines" stamps. Harlock was ranked fourth in Mania Entertainment's 10 Most Iconic Anime Heroes written by Thomas Zoth who commented that "as befitting his archetype status, Harlock has inspired many other manga and anime characters with his strong, stoic appearance and manner".

Several anime and manga characters have been, in some way, inspired by Matsumoto's creation. Naoko Takeuchi drew inspiration from Harlock's stoic qualities ("strong, silent, unshakeable") when designing the character of Tuxedo Mask, while Last Exile's Alex Row was modeled after the Captain. His basic character design is even thought to be a source of inspiration for Osamu Tezuka's manga character Black Jack. A parody of Harlock also appears in Project A-ko.

== Adaptations in other media ==
- In France, where the anime was very popular, but renamed "Albator" to avoid mix-ups with Captain Haddock, in the early 1980s, a local comic series in album format was produced by writer Claude Moliterni and anonymous artists of Studio Five Stars.
- Eternity Comics, an imprint of Malibu Comics, produced an American comic book series based on Captain Harlock. It was written by Robert W. Gibson and illustrated by Ben Dunn and Tim Eldred. The storyline allegedly started two years after the events in Arcadia of My Youth but ignores the events in Endless Road SSX while still borrowing elements from them. The comics discontinued in 1992 after it was discovered that Malibu did not have the rights to use Captain Harlock. Reportedly, the alleged representative for the rights to Harlock with whom Malibu exchanged money turned out to be fraudulent and was in no way connected to the rights holders.
- In April 2008, Eight Peaks, a South Korean production company, announced that it had signed a joint production contract with Japan's Genome Entertainment to produce a live-action film based on Captain Harlock. Original creator Leiji Matsumoto expressed concern with the project, as neither company had approached him for consent to make the film.

=== Other appearances ===
- Captain Harlock, or characters indistinguishable from him, have made frequent "unbilled cameo" appearances in many other works of Leiji Matsumoto, including Galaxy Express 999, Queen Emeraldas, and Galaxy Railways as the joker in a deck of playing cards.
- Captain Harlock was originally intended to appear in Space Battleship Yamato during their return voyage from Iscandar. The idea was dropped for a number of reasons which probably included the fact that the rights to Yamato were at the time owned by executive producer Yoshinobu Nishizaki. This idea evolved into simply finding Mamoru Kodai (Alex Wildstar) alive on Iscandar. The idea was still used later in a Yamato manga by Matsumoto where Yamato later encounters Mamoru who assumed the false identity of Captain Harlock (as revealed when hero Susumu Kodai finds a copy of a Captain Harlock manga among his supposedly dead brother's belongings).
- In 2001, Cosmo Warrior Zero presented a version of the story in which Captain Zero, a human veteran of the Earth-Mechanized War, is commanded by the Machine Men, who won the war and now rule Earth, to hunt down the Space Pirate who is still resisting the invaders. This series focuses on Zero and his misfit crew as they take on the hopeless mission, fighting a more skilled enemy who also may be more justified in his actions than they are. Harlock, Tochiro and Emeraldas put in mostly supporting guest appearances, and are shown as being slightly younger than their previous incarnations.
- In the Warhammer 40,000 Roleplay tabletop games, the legendary Rogue Trader Solomon Haarlock is presumably named after Captain Harlock and Robert E. Howard's Solomon Kane. Another member of the Haarlock Dynasty, Erasmus Haarlock, bears a number of physical similarities to Captain Harlock: The long, wild hair, a missing right eye (a cybernetic replacement rather than just an eyepatch) and scars around his left eye.
- In the episode "Space Booty" of Megas XLR, the villain is a parody of Harlock, his name even being Warlock. He invites Coop. Kiva, and Jamie onto his ship and tries to convince Kiva to stay with him and forget about her two friends.
- Glenn Danzig would often wear a Captain Harlock skull and crossbones T-shirt when he played in The Misfits.
- In the cartoon series Steven Universe, the character Lars Barriga takes up an appearance and role inspired by Captain Harlock in the season five episode "Lars of the Stars".
- In the penultimate episode of the anime series Magical Project S, also known as Pretty Sammy TV, the magical girl, Pixy Misa is seen cosplaying as Captain Harlock while she was piloting NASA's Endeavour shuttle with a rudder as she was flying towards the Magic Kingdom of Jurailhelm, all while mimicking the famous captain.
