= Captain Harlock =

Captain Harlock may refer to:

- Captain Harlock (manga)
  - Captain Harlock (character)
