= Captain Harlock: Dimensional Voyage =

Manga series about space pirate Captain Harlock

- Captain Harlock
- Vol. 1 cover

キャプテンハーロック～次元航海～ (Captain Harlock ~Jigen Kōkai~)
- Genre: Space opera
- Manga
- Written by: Leiji Matsumoto
- Illustrated by: Kōichi Shimahoshi
- Published by: Akita Shoten
- English publisher: NA: Seven Seas Entertainment
- Magazine: Champion Red
- Original run: August 2014 – January 18, 2019
- Volumes: 10

Captain Harlock: Dimensional Voyage (Japanese: キャプテンハーロック～次元航海～, Hepburn: Captain Harlock ~Jigen Kōkai~) is a manga series written by Leiji Matsumoto and illustrated by Kōichi Shimahoshi. It was the final manga by Leiji Matsumoto before his death in February 2023.

The series was launched in August 2014 in the pages of Akita Shoten's Champion Red magazine, to celebrate the 60th anniversary of Matsumoto's debut.

The series is a retelling of the original 1978 Space Pirate Captain Harlock manga, with some significant plot differences, and illustrated by Shimahoshi in a modernized version of Matsumoto's classic style. In January 2017, it was licensed in the U.S. by Seven Seas Entertainment. It was also published in Spain by Norma Editorial, and in France by Kana.

== Plot ==
In the future, Earth is a decadent planet. With everything provided by the state, the Earth Federation, nobody works and a few rich people control everything. The willful people had left the planet, leaving behind only the decadent and the ones who don't have money to leave. The Gaia Fleet, composed by Earth's best warriors, had not been seen in many years, and is now dedicated to protect humankind's new home planet, Big Earth. When the threat of the Mazon looms over Earth, only one man can protect it: Captain Harlock. While the government sees Harlock as an outlaw, others see him as Earth's last hope.

About a year before the beginning of the story, a strange spherical object arrived from space. Dr. Daiba has repeatedly tried to warn Earth's Prime Minister of an incoming threat, but the government is more interested in riches and pleasure than in protecting the planet. After he's killed by the Mazon, his son Tadashi becomes frustrated by the government's flippant attitude, landing himself in prison. Tadashi is invited aboard the battleship Arcadia, under the command of the legendary Captain Harlock. Tadashi joins its crew in their quest to protect Earth against the Mazon.

== Characters ==
=== The crew of the Arcadia ===
- Captain Harlock: Captain of the Arcadia and former officer of the Gaia Fleet, he owns one of the legendary Cosmo Dragoon pistols.
- Tadashi Daiba: Dr. Daiba's son who joins the Arcadia's crew to fight the Mazon. He later goes back to Earth to investigate and joins Mayu and Zero.
- Yattaran: Arcadia's second-in-command.
- Dr. Zero: Arcadia's Chief Medical Officer, he has a cat named Mii, whom he has trained to steal sake from Masu's kitchen.
- Masu: Arcadia's kitchen steward, she wields a really big knife and has zero tolerance for Mii's raids on her kitchen.
- Maji: Arcadia's Chief Engineer.
- Yuki: A young woman who is a bridge officer on the Arcadia.
- Miime: An alien woman who describes herself as "a woman who has given everything to Harlock". She is also the last of the Nibelungs.
- Zero: A young man who loathes both humankind and the Machine People, but who would give up his life to protect his chosen family, the Arcadia and its crew. He goes to Earth to protect Mayu. They later rescue Tadashi and join him.

=== Harlock's allies ===
- Emeraldas: Captain of the Queen Emeraldas and a wanted outlaw like Harlock, she possesses one of the Cosmo Dragoon pistols. She is also Mayu's mother.
- Tochirô Ooyama: Harlock's friend and a genius engineer who reconverted a Yukikaze-kai type ship into the powerful Arcadia and gave it to Harlock to protect Earth while he took care of his own enemy, the Machine Empire. He also build Deathshadow Island, a hollowed out asteroid that serves and Arcadia's base, following the ship at a distance, as well as the Cosmo Dragoon pistols.
- Mayu: The 14 years-old daughter of Tochirô and Emeraldas, who lives in an orphanage in Earth. The mechanized police tries to arrest her, but she is saved by Zero.
- Tetsuro Hoshino: Owner of another of the Cosmo Dragoon pistols.

=== Earth ===
- Dr. Daiba: A scientist who tried to warn Earth about the Mazon threat before being killed by them.
- Isora Kirita: Vicecommander of the Gaia Fleet, Kirita hates Harlock, whom he considers a coward. One of the few willful men left on Earth, he decided to defend Earth at any cost.
- Prime Minister: Prime Minister of Earth Federation, his only interests are in women, golf and fame, and believes that divine providence would protect Earth.
- Commander Tôdô: Commander of the Gaia Fleet on Big Earth and Kirita's superior, who believes one day Kirita and Harlock's ideals will be the same.

=== Mazon ===
- Raflesia: Queen of the Mazon, she considers Harlock the only threat of their plans to conquer Earth.
- Paphio aka Shizuka Namino: A Mazon who masquerades as the Prime Minister's secretary.
- Jogibel: Captain of the Mazon's special fleet against Harlock.

=== Other ===
- Faust: President of the Galactic Railway company. Under his true name, Gôzô Hoshino, he was an officer of the Gaia Fleet until he resigned. He is also known as the Black Warrior.
- Bolgazanda: President of Earth's autonomous region of Megalopolis, he plans to run in the next elections to Prime Minister opposing the incumbent.
