= Cosmo Warrior Zero =

2000 Japanese video game and 2001 anime series

- Cover of the first Cosmo Warrior Zero DVD volume.

コスモウォーリアー零 (Kosumo Wōriā Zero)
- Genre: Adventure; Science fiction Space opera
- Created by: Leiji Matsumoto
- Video game
- Publisher: Taito
- Directed by: Katsushi Murakami
- Produced by: Doctor Serial Nishioka
- Designed by: Katsumi Itabashi (mechanical)
- Genre: Third-person shooter
- Platform: PlayStation, PC
- Released: May 18, 2000; 25 years ago (PlayStation), May 17, 2002; 23 years ago (PC)
- Anime television series
- Directed by: Kazuyoshi Yokota
- Produced by: Shunji Namiki
- Written by: Dr. Serial Nishioka
- Music by: Germiniart High Quality
- Studio: Vega Entertainment
- Licensed by: NA: Discotek Media
- Original network: TV Tokyo (TX Network)
- Original run: 26 July 2001 – 28 September 2001
- Episodes: 15
- Related works
- Space Pirate Captain Harlock; Galaxy Express 999; Queen Emeraldas

Cosmo Warrior Zero (コスモウォーリアー零(ゼロ), Kosumo Wōriā Zero) is a science fiction third-person shooter video game released by Taito. It was adapted into an anime television series in 2001.

== Plot ==
The long war between the planet Earth and the machine men is finally over, resulting in a peace that is more a victory for the machine men than the Earth. Warius Zero lost his family in the war to the machinemen but despite this he still is a member of the Earth fleet that is now working in concert with the machine men. His ship, made up of both humans and machine men, has been given a near impossible task: capture the space pirate Captain Harlock. While Zero struggles to accomplish this task, evidence begins to surface that the peace between machine men and Earth may not be as it seems.

== Characters ==
Captain Warius Zero
Voiced by: Toshiyuki Morikawa (Japanese); Crispin Freeman (English)

After having his wife and child disappear in the battle between the humans and Machine men, Zero has no choice but to serve Earth's government as a Captain of second rate ships. After a run-in with the legendary Captain Harlock, Zero is given the new task of hunting down the space pirate. With his new controversial crew of machine men and humans and his old ship, the Karyū (Fire Dragon), Zero sets out to complete his mission and to keep his crew from fighting. After meeting Harlock, Zero has more of an appreciation towards him and stills believes in him even after he sees him attack civilians. Later on in the series, Zero and his first officer Marina Oki grow feelings for each other and end up falling in love.

Harlock
Voiced by: Eiji Takemoto (Japanese); Steven Blum (English)
Marina Oki
Voiced by: Aya Hisakawa (Japanese); Lia Sargent (English)
Lady Emeraldas
Voiced by: Kikuko Inoue (Japanese); Julie Thornton (English)
Tochiro
Voiced by: Tomohiro Nishimura (Japanese); Marvin Lee (English)
Grenadier
Voiced by: Hidenari Ugaki (Japanese); Tom Wyner (English)
Silviana
Voiced by: Kaori (Japanese); Mia Lee (English)
Nohara
Voiced by: Kouhei Owada (Japanese); Dave Mallow (English)
Umihara
Voiced by: Nobuaki Sekine (Japanese); Bob Papenbrook (English)
Ishikura
Voiced by: Souichiro Hoshi (Japanese); Terrence Stone (English)
Rai
Voiced by: Tadashi Miyazawa (Japanese); Michael Sorich (English)
Dr. Machine
Voiced by: Takashi Matsuyama (Japanese); Lex Lang (English)
Battlizer
Voiced by: Yoshiaki Matsumoto (Japanese); Kirk Thornton (English)
Yattaran
Voiced by: Yoshiaki Matsumoto (Japanese); Kirk Thornton (English)
Axelater
Voiced by: Yoshikazu Nagano (Japanese); Lex Lang (English)
Phase Breaker
Voiced by: Yukinobu Kaneko (Japanese); Lex Lang (English)
Helmatier
Voiced by: Yuri Shiratori (Japanese); Karen Strassman (English)
Zess Voder
Voiced by: Zenichi Nagano (Japanese); Michael McConnohie (English)

== References to other works ==
Leiji Matsumoto's other older works were referenced in this series:

- First Officer Marina Oki's home has marine snow, a direct reference to Leiji's 1980 television special The Legend of Marine Snow.
- The main weapon of the Karyū is the "Saint Elmo", a reference to the 1987 Saint Elmo – Hikari no Raihousha.

== Reception ==
Helen McCarthy in 500 Essential Anime Movies praised the screenplay and commented that "very few writers handle doomed heroism as well as Matsumoto".
