= Lex Lang =

American voice actor

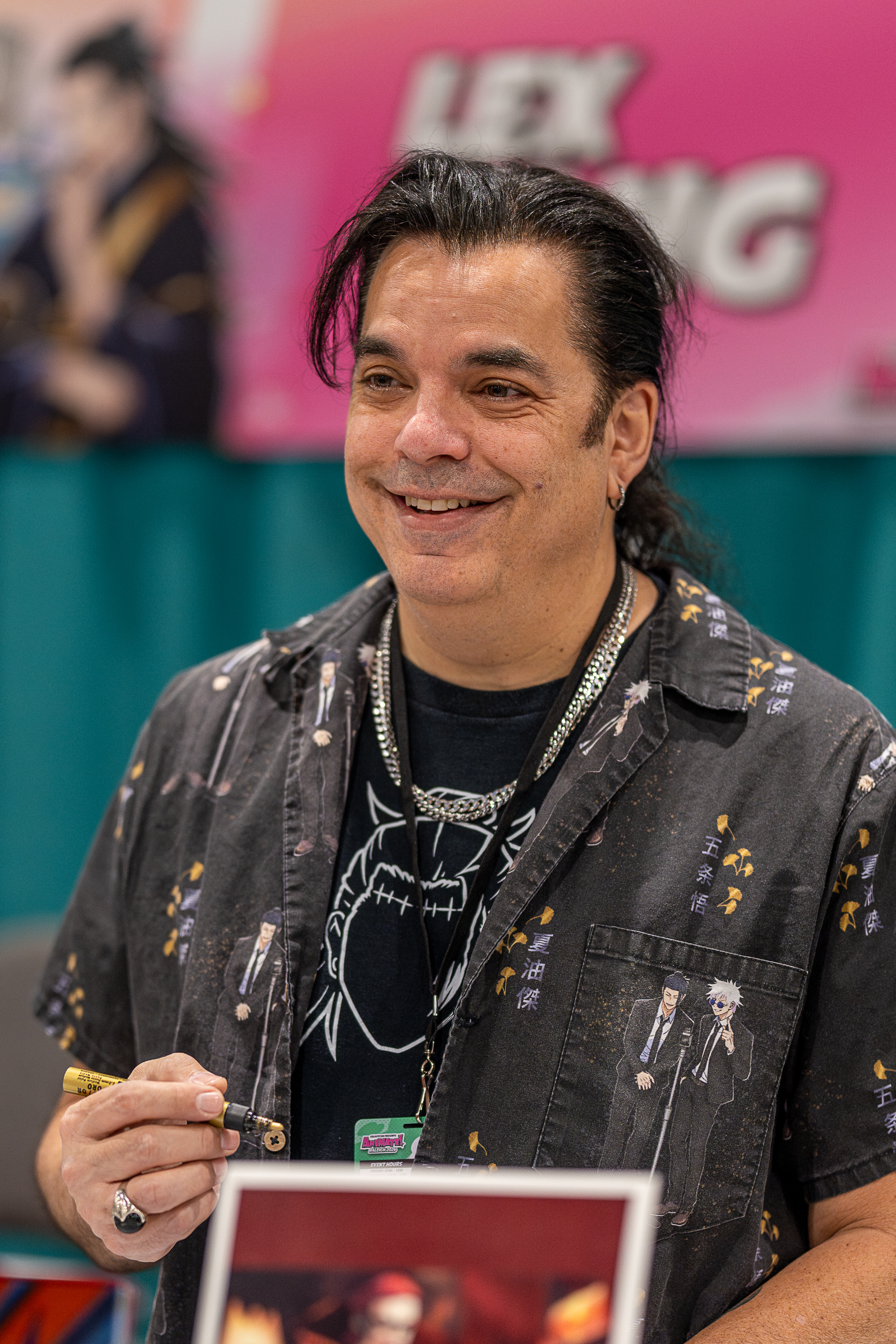
- Lang at Animate! Raleigh in 2026
- Born: Hollywood, California, U.S.
- Occupations: Voice actor, voice director
- Years active: 1996–present
- Spouse: Sandy Fox (m. 2004)
- Website: www.lexlang.com

Lex Lang is an American voice actor and voice director, who has provided voices and served as a director for a number of animations and video games. He is known for voicing Doctor Neo Cortex in the Crash Bandicoot franchise, Suguru Geto in Jujutsu Kaisen, Ecliptor in Power Rangers in Space, and Goemon Ishikawa in Lupin the Third.

== Early life ==
Lang was born in Hollywood, California, and began performing at 7 years old, hosting a radio show and being the master of ceremonies for Seagram's National Comedy Competition.

Throughout high school, Lang acted in various theatre productions at the Community Theatre in Scottsdale, Arizona. His stage credits include The Fantastiks, Bus Stop, The Apple Tree, Of Mice and Men, and Cinderella.

While attending college, he performed stand-up comedy and did impressions for various clubs including The Comedy Store, Dr. Giggles, The NFL Cub, Anderson's Fifth Estate and The Improv. He would perform along with Jim Carrey, Richard Belzer, and David Spade. He would later move back to Hollywood, California to study music at the Musician's Institute before pursuing voice acting in 1996.

== Career ==
A two-time Daytime Entertainment Emmy® Awards-honored voice actor, (first for his portrayal of Professor Behdety in the 2003/2004 season of Tutenstein, then again as The Doorman and his dog Hundley on the 2009/2010 season of Curious George), he has been in hundreds of productions ranging from original animation, anime, video games, celebrity voice matching, and movie trailers. He is known for voicing Doctor Neo Cortex in the Crash Bandicoot series, replacing Clancy Brown. He is also known for his anime voice work playing roles such as Suguru Geto from Jujutsu Kaisen, Sagara Sanosuke from Rurouni Kenshin and Goemon Ishikawa XIII in the Lupin III franchise.

Lang has worked as voice director for clients including Cartoon Network, EWAM, Sony, Bang Zoom! Entertainment, Technicolor, PCB Productions, Microsoft, Xbox 360, Code Masters, HBO and Warner Brothers.

== Personal life ==
Lang is married to fellow voice actor Sandy Fox. They live in Studio City, California.

Lang is also a musician, and he plays guitar, bass, and piano. He has also written 200 songs for various genres.

== Other ventures ==
In 1998, Lang and his wife co-founded the Love Planet Foundation, a non-profit organization which creates educational materials for children on the importance of recycling, world water awareness, and the preservation of the planet. They also created Love Planet Productions, which includes several multimedia projects such as anime presentation shows, toddler shows and products, and Zen programming. In 2006 they launched a bottled spring water business called H2Om Water with Intention, which has received recognition as a sponsor at several events including Sting's Rainforest Foundation Carnegie Hall Concert and the Elevate Film Festival. Lang was also a Deepak Chopra meditation instructor.

== Filmography ==
=== Anime ===
List of voice performances in anime
Year	Series	Role	Notes	Source
1997	Street Fighter II V	Det. Tsung, Interpol Aide, Additional voices	As Alex Lang	
1997	Tokyo Revelation	Additional voices	OVA	
1997	El-Hazard: The Wanderers	Student Councilman, Village Elder, Palace Guard	Animaze/Pioneer dub	
1997	Armageddon	Delta Boy	Animaze dub, as Alexis Lang	
1998	Battle Athletes	Additional voices	OVA	
1998	El-Hazard: The Magnificent World 2	Additional voices	OVA	
1998	Fushigi Yûgi	Additional voices		
1998	Giant Robo	Additional voices	OVA	
1999	Battle Athletes Victory	Sergei Garenstein, Operator		
1999	The Cockpit	Captain A	OVA, as Walter Lang	
1999	Magic Knight Rayearth	High Priest Zagato, Mayor, Rayearth, Big Ugly Monster, Windam	Also ADR script writer (Ep. 12), music producer As Alexis Lang	
1999	Mobile Suit Gundam 0083: Stardust Memory	Allen	OVA	
1999	Ninja Cadets	Hayashi, Matsuzaka	OVA	
1999	Jungle de Ikou!	Evil Ongo, Takuma's dad	OVA	
1999	Rurouni Kenshin	Hiko Seijuro	OVA series, Sony dub	
1999	Wild 7	Dispatcher	OVA	
1999–2006	Digimon series	Cyberdramon, WarGreymon, Omnimon, Rapidmon, others		
2000	Flint the Time Detective	Dino Fisherman		
2000	Magic Knight Rayearth 2	Windam, Lantis, Rayearth, Zagato, Satoru Shidou		
2000	Trigun	Terrorist, Newscaster		
2000–2002	Rurouni Kenshin	Sagara Sanosuke, Iwanbo, others	TV series, Media Blasters dub	
2001	Arc the Lad	Jack		
2001	Apocalypse Zero	Kakugo Hagakure, Zero	OVA	
2001	Hand Maid May	Kintaro Yamazaki		
2001	Mezzo Forte	Bodyguard	OVA	
2001	Mobile Suit Gundam: The 08th MS Team	Ginias Sahalin	OVA	
2001	Nightwalker	Cain, Shunichi, Asami's Lover		
2001	Saint Tail	Hayase, Henchman		
2001	Transformers: Robots in Disguise	Tow-Line		
2001	Vampire Princess Miyu	Ryosuke, others	TV series, Tokyopop	
2001–2002	Transformers: Robots in Disguise	Tow Line		
2002	Babel II: Beyond Infinity	Lodem, Babel I, Balan, Dennis	Also ADR director and writer	
2002	Cosmo Warrior Zero	Axelater, Phase Braker, Dr. Aminner, Doctor, Master, Dr. Machine		
2002	éX-Driver	Student, Todo Thug A, Cain Tokioka, others	OVA; Also ADR director and ADR writer	
2002	Tsukikage Ran	Additional voices		
2002	Ys	Dark Fact	OVA	
2003	Argentosoma	Frank, various characters		
2003	Ai Yori Aoshi	Suzuki, Boy 2, TV Announcer, Akiko's Father, Takashi, Student, others		
2003	.hack//SIGN	Crim		
2003	Blue Dragon	Blue Dragon, Dark Dragon		
2003	Daigunder	Tri-Horn		
2003	Figure 17	D.D.		
2003	Gun Frontier	Stage Coach Guard, Guard, Man B, Heidelnoir		
2003	Heat Guy J	Shun Aurora, Giobanni Gallo, others		
2003	Idol Project	BaliHawaii Presenter, Manager, Alien	OVA; Also ADR director Ep. 3-4	
2003	Immortal Grand Prix	Metoo	Microseries	
2003	Initial D series	Ryosuke "Ry" Takahashi	Tokyopop dub	
2003	Kikaider	Patrol Car Officer, Carmine Spider		
2003	Last Exile	Claimh-Solais Soldier, others		
2003	Lupin the Third Part II	Goemon Ishikawa XIII, Kosuke Kidani	TV series	
2003	Mirage of Blaze	Shuhei Chiaki, Danjyo Kousaka, Attendant	Also ADR director, writer	
2003	s-CRY-ed	Kunihiko Kimishima		
2003	Wild Arms	King Kianu		
2003	Witch Hunter Robin	Juzo Narumi, Thug, Shunji Nagira		
2003	Ys II: Castle in the Heavens	Jira, Dark Fact	OVA	
2003–2004	Mahoromatic	Slash, Gang Member, Commander Hayato Daimon	Also OVAs and specials	
2003–2004	The Twelve Kingdoms	Shoryu, others	Also ADR director, ADR writer (Ep. 1-40)	
2004	Burn-Up Scramble	ATM Thief, Imaginary Boyfriend, Arcade Thug		
2004	Gad Guard	Haneke, various characters		
2004	Ghost in the Shell: Stand Alone Complex	Officer, Commander, others		
2004	Gungrave	Bunji Kugashira, "Mad Dog" Ladd Carabel		
2004	Here is Greenwood	Furusawa	OVA, Media Blasters dub	
2004	Space Pirate Captain Herlock	Captain Harlock	OVA	
2004	Stellvia	Ritsou Soujin, others		
2004	Submarine 707R	Jack Vance Captain, Chairman Jonathan, PKN Chairman, other	OVA	
2004	Wolf's Rain	Soldier		
2004	éX-Driver: Nina & Rei Danger Zone	Additional voices	OVA; Also voice director, ADR writer	
2005	Aquarian Age: The Movie	Ray Alucard		
2005	Fafner in the Azure	Kenji Kondo, various characters	Also voice director	
2005	Immortal Grand Prix	Dew	TV series	
2005	Mars Daybreak	Kuberness, Regardie, EF Soldier		
2005	New Getter Robo	Ryoma Nagare		
2005	Otogi Zoshi	Mansairaku		
2005	Planetes	Sia's father		
2005	Saiyuki Reload	Genjyo Sanzo		
2005	Samurai Champloo	Musashi "Johnny" Miyamoto, Xavier the Third, others		
2005	Scrapped Princess	Socom, Galil, others		
2005	Tenjho Tenge	Ishimatsu, others		
2005–2009	Naruto	Teuchi, Tsubasa, Hayate Gekko, Jigumo Fuma, others		
2006	Kannazuki no Miko	Kazuki Ōgami		
2006	Fate/stay night	Issei Ryudo		
2006	Karas	Announcer, Monster, Shako		
2006	Saiyuki Reload Gunlock	Genjo Sanzo		
2006–2014	Bleach	Marechiyo Ōmaeda, Runuganga		
2007	Tales of Phantasia	Lundgrom	OVA	
2008	Lucky Star	Meito Anizawa, TV Host, others		
2008–2009	Blue Dragon	Blue Dragon		
2009–2015	Naruto Shippuden	Teuchi, Kitane, Hayate Gekko, others		
2015	Lupin the Third Part IV: The Italian Adventure	Goemon Ishikawa XIII	TV series	
2015	Yuki Yuna is a Hero		ADR Director	
2015	Fate/stay night: Unlimited Blade Works	Soichiro Kuzuki	TV series	
2015–2016	Durarara!!×2	Egor, Shu Aozaki		
2015–2016	Aldnoah.Zero	Cruhteo	Also ADR director	
2016–present	One-Punch Man	Flashy Flash, various		
2017	Dragon Ball Super	Goku, Goku Black	Bang Zoom! dub for Toonami Asia	
2018	Lupin the Third Part V	Goemon Ishikawa XIII	TV series	
2018	JoJo's Bizarre Adventure: Diamond is Unbreakable	Anjuro Katagiri		
2020	Ghost in the Shell: SAC_2045	Vendor Man		
2020–present	Jujutsu Kaisen	Suguru Geto		
2022–present	Bleach: Thousand-Year Blood War	Marechiyo Omaeda		

=== Animation ===
List of voice performances in animation
Year	Series	Role	Notes	Source
2002	ChalkZone	Ronnie Lox	Episode: "Purple Haze/No PlaceLike Home/Disaster Park/I Need a Song"	
2004	All Grown Up!	Talk Show Host, Page	Episode: "Brother, Can You Spare the Time?"	
2004–06	Justice League Unlimited	Atomic Skull, Captain Cold, Heat Wave	8 episodes	
2006–07	Avatar: The Last Airbender	Fire Lord Sozin (young), additional voices	3 episodes	
2006–08	Legion of Super Heroes	R. J. Brande, Grimbor the Chainsman, Announcer	3 episodes	
2007–08	The Batman	Metallo, Basil Karlo/Clayface, Hamilton Hill	4 episodes	
2007–22	Curious George	Hundley, Doorman	Main role	
2009	Batgirl: Year One	Batman	Motion comic	
2009–10	Batman: The Brave and the Bold	Doctor Polaris, Hourman, Gold, Hydrogen, Alloy, Batman / Dick Grayson	5 episodes	
2012	The Avengers: Earth's Mightiest Heroes	Doctor Doom	2 episodes	
2013	Regular Show	Barry, Police Officer	Episode: "Every Meat Burritos"	
2015	Ever After High	Lance Charming		
2016	Lego Star Wars: The Resistance Rises	Poe Dameron	Episode: "Poe to the Rescue"	
2016	Miraculous: Tales of Ladybug and Cat Noir	Jagged Stone		
2018	South Park	Narrator (adult Kenny McCormick)	Episode: "The Scoots"	
2018–19	Star Wars Resistance	Major Vonreg	8 episodes	

=== Film ===
List of voice performances in direct-to-video and television films
Year	Title	Role	Notes	Source
1996	Black Jack	Additional voices	Animaze dub	
1998	Yu Yu Hakusho: the Movie	Kazuma Kuwabara	OVA, Animaze/Media Blasters dub	
1999	Reborn from Hell: Samurai Armageddon	Shosetu Yu	Live-action dub	
2001	Street Fighter Alpha	Guard		
2001	Akira	Man on Vehicle's Radio 2	Animaze dub	
2001	Reborn from Hell II: Jubei's Revenge	Shosetu Yu	Live-action dub	
2002	Cowboy Bebop: The Movie	Additional voices		
2002	Mobile Suit Gundam: The 08th MS Team - Miller's Report	Additional voices		
2004	éX-Driver The Movie	Caine Tokioka, Fitz, David, Police Officer	Also voice director, ADR writer	
2004	Mobile Suit Gundam F91	Bardo		
2004	Alive	Tenshu Yashiro	Live-action dub	
2007	The Three Robbers	Felix		
2008	Justice League: The New Frontier	Rick Flag		
2009	Curious George: A Very Monkey Christmas	Hundley, The Doorman		
2011	Legend of the Millennium Dragon	Additional voices		
2013	Justice League: The Flashpoint Paradox	Captain Atom, Funeral Presider		
2013	Curious George: Swings Into Spring	Hundley, The Doorman, Doxie Puppies		
2015	The Last: Naruto the Movie	Hayate Gekko		
2024	Digimon Adventure: Our War Game!	WarGreymon, Omnimon		
2024	Digimon Adventure 02: Digimon Hurricane Touchdown!! / Transcendent Evolution! The Golden Digimentals	Rapidmon		

List of voice performances in feature films
Year	Series	Role	Notes	Source
1997	Turbo: A Power Rangers Movie	Lerigot, Rygog	As Alexis Lang	
1998	Six-String Samurai	Death		
2000	Digimon: The Movie	WarGreymon, Omnimon, Rapidmon		
2003	Lupin the Third: The Mystery of Mamo	Goemon Ishikawa XIII		
2015	Maze Runner: The Scorch Trials	Additional voices		
2015	Hotel Transylvania 2	Additional voices		
2015	The Laws of the Universe Part 0	Additional voices	Limited theatrical release	
2017	The Star	Hunter		
2018	Lupin the Third: Legend of the Gold of Babylon	Goemon Ishikawa XIII		
2019	Goemon's Blood Spray	Goemon Ishikawa XIII		
2019	Lupin the Third: Blood Seal of the Eternal Mermaid	Goemon Ishikawa XIII	(Special)	
2020	Lupin the Third: Goodbye Partner	Goemon Ishikawa XIII	(Special)	
2020	Lupin III: The First	Goemon Ishikawa XIII		
2022	Jujutsu Kaisen 0	Suguru Geto		

=== Video games ===
List of voice performances in video games
Year	Series	Role	Notes	Source
2000	Star Trek: Klingon Academy	Civil War First Officer, Hopogh Captain, Federation Commander 4		
2001	Fear Effect 2: Retro Helix	Jacob "Deke" DeCourt		
2002	Digimon Rumble Arena	WarGreymon, Omnimon		
2003	.hack//Mutation	Moonstone, Crim		
2003	.hack//Outbreak	Moonstone, Crim		
2003	Star Wars Rogue Squadron III: Rebel Strike	Han Solo, additional voices		
2003	Final Fantasy XI	Additional voices		
2004	.hack//Quarantine	Moonstone, Crim		
2004	Crash Twinsanity	Dr. Neo Cortex		
2004	EverQuest	Additional voices		
2004	World of Warcraft	Additional voices		
2005	Haunting Ground	Debilitas		
2005	Star Wars: Battlefront II	Han Solo, additional voices		
2005	The Matrix: Path of Neo	Police, Security, Civilian		
2005	Crash Tag Team Racing	Dr. Neo Cortex		
2006	Star Wars: Empire at War	Scout Trooper		
2006	Samurai Champloo: Sidetracked	Worso Tsurumaki		
2006	Naruto series	Hayate Gekko, Gamabunta, Shikaku Nara, Kidomaru, Teuchi		
2006	Dirge of Cerberus: Final Fantasy VII	Incidental characters		
2006	Xenosaga Episode III: Also sprach Zarathustra	Luis Virgil		
2007	Ghost Rider	Blackout		
2007	Monster Kingdom: Jewel Summoner	Grey		
2007	Blue Dragon	Young Nene		
2007	Crash of the Titans	Dr. Neo Cortex		
2007	Mass Effect	Ambassador Din Korlack, Yaroslev Tartakovsky, Colonist, Refugee, Salarian Doorman, Salarian Patron, Salarian Soldier		
2008	Crash: Mind over Mutant	Dr. Neo Cortex		
2008	Golden Axe: Beast Rider	Additional voices		
2009	Brütal Legend	Glitter Fists, Warfathers		
2009	Dragon Age: Origins	Additional voices		
2009	Resident Evil: The Darkside Chronicles	Marvin Brannagh		
2010	Mass Effect 2	Keystone, Elite Krogan Enemies, Stocks Volus, Urdnot Warrior, Used Ship Salesman		
2010	Star Wars: The Force Unleashed II	Stormtrooper		
2011	Transformers: Dark of the Moon	Autobot Soldiers, Decepticon Soldiers	Posted under Additional Voices	
2012	Mass Effect 3	Ambassador Din Korlack		
2012	Kinect Star Wars	Magna Guard, Stormtrooper		
2013	The Cave	The Zen Master, King, Speakerbox		
2013	Marvel Heroes	Doctor Doom		
2013	Skylanders: Swap Force	Grim Creeper		
2014	Lightning Returns: Final Fantasy XIII	Additional voices		
2014	Titanfall	Spyglass		
2014	Skylanders: Trap Team	Grim Creeper		
2014	Digimon All-Star Rumble	WarGreymon, Examon, Dorulumon, Omnimon		
2015	Batman: Arkham Knight	Officer Kevern, Officer Deaves, Officer Doyle		
2015	Skylanders: SuperChargers	Grim Creeper		
2015	Guild Wars 2: Heart of Thorns	Pact Commander (Charr Male)		
2016	Skylanders: Imaginators	Grim Creeper, Dr. Neo Cortex		
2017	Crash Bandicoot N. Sane Trilogy	Dr. Neo Cortex		
2018	God of War	Additional Voices		
2018	Lego DC Super-Villains	Deathstorm, Mazahs, Heat Wave, Mantis		
2019	The Lego Movie 2 Videogame	Additional voices		
2019	Crash Team Racing Nitro-Fueled	Dr. Neo Cortex, Mega-Mix, Narrator, additional voices		
2020	Crash Bandicoot 4: It's About Time	Dr. Neo Cortex		
2020	Yakuza: Like a Dragon	Additional voices		
2021	Crash Bandicoot: On the Run!	Dr. Neo Cortex		
2023	Like a Dragon Gaiden: The Man Who Erased His Name	Additional voices		
2024	Like a Dragon: Infinite Wealth	Additional voices		
2025	Digimon Story: Time Stranger	Additional voices		
2025	Octopath Traveler 0	Celsus		

=== Live-action ===
List of voice performances in live-action television and film
Year	Title	Role	Notes	Source
1994	VR Troopers	Tropedobot, Robot		
1996	Masked Rider	Cyborsect		
1996	Power Rangers Zeo	Louie Kaboom	Uncredited	
1997	Power Rangers Turbo	Rygog, Lerigot	as Alexis Lang	
1998	Power Rangers in Space	Ecliptor, Jakarak	Uncredited	
2002	Power Rangers Wild Force	Zen-Aku		
2020	Doom Patrol	Candlemaker		

=== Other appearances ===
List of voice performances in animation
Year	Series	Role	Notes	Source
2001	Primetime Glick	Announcer		
2002	Whammy! The All-New Press Your Luck	Contestant		
