= Space Pirate Captain Herlock: The Endless Odyssey =

2002 original video animation

- Cover of the first DVD volume.
- Genre: Adventure, science fiction
- Original video animation
- Directed by: Rintaro
- Produced by: Manabu Tamura; Satoki Toyada
- Written by: Sadayuki Murai
- Music by: Takayuki Hattori
- Studio: Madhouse
- Released: 21 December 2002 – 21 December 2003
- Episodes: 13

Space Pirate Captain Herlock: The Endless Odyssey, also known in Japan as Space Pirate Captain Harlock: Outside Legend - The Endless Odyssey, is an OVA based on the manga Space Pirate Captain Harlock.

== English cast ==
- Lex Lang as Captain Herlock
- Anthony Mozdy as Dr. Zero
- Richard Cansino as Tadashi Daiba
- David Lelyveld as Yattaran
- James Lyon as Chief Ilita
- Julie Ann Taylor as Kei Yuki
- Kari Wahlgren as Nana
- Mia Bradly as Mimeh
- Michelle Ruff as Shizuka Namino

== Japanese cast ==
- Kōichi Yamadera as Captain Herlock
- Chafurin as Chief Engineer Maji
- Emi Shinohara as Shizuka Namino
- Fumiko Orikasa as Nana
- Nachi Nozawa as Dr. Zero
- Naoki Tatsuta as Yattran
- Norio Wakamoto as Chief Ilita
- Rei Sakuma as Kei Yuki
- Reiko Suzuki as Masu
- Tomokazu Seki as Tadashi Daiba
- Yuko Minaguchi as Mimeh

== Reception ==
The series got mostly positive reviews from critics.
