= Submarine Super 99 =

Japanese manga series

- Cover of the first volume of the manga.

潜水艦スーパー99 (Sensuikan Sūpā Nain Nain)
- Genre: Military, Science fiction
- Manga
- Written by: Leiji Matsumoto
- Published by: Akita Shoten
- Original run: November 1964 – December 1965
- Volumes: 2
- Anime television series
- Directed by: Hiromichi Matano
- Produced by: Kōki Okagawa; Tetsuya Tsuchihashi
- Written by: Keisuke Fujikawa
- Music by: Shinichirō Mizobuchi
- Studio: Vega Entertainment
- Licensed by: NA: Discotek Media
- Original network: AT-X
- English network: CA: Fairchild TV
- Original run: May 8, 2003 – July 31, 2003
- Episodes: 13
- icon

Submarine Super 99 (Japanese: 潜水艦スーパー99, Hepburn: Sensuikan Sūpā Nain Nain) is a manga series written and illustrated by Leiji Matsumoto. It was adapted into an anime that aired on AT-X.

== Story ==
In 20XX, Earth's ocean is taken over by a mysterious "ocean empire". The empire's military commander in chief, Hell Deathbird, demands that all shipping request his permission for sailing. Earth's only hope is the submarine called Super 99, a mysterious submarine designed by Dr. Juzou Oki.

The story begins as Japanese forces decided to investigate the mysterious threat beneath the ocean. Goro Oki gives his younger brother, Susumu, a rifle, a weapon modified from Type 99 rifle of the World War II era; Susumu is also given a key bearing a "99" marck by his grandfather Juzou. Goro and Juzou Oki set off in an exploration submarine to investigate the attacks in the Japanese Trench; soon later, their vessel is attacked by a mysterious submarine hiding in the Trench. The surface survey ship loses contact with the survey submarine, and two spies storm her command bridge, taking the crew hostage. The spies are overpowered as the mysterious submarine attempts to torpedo the survey ship, and Susumu manages to destroy the incoming torpedo with his rifle.

== Characters ==
- Susumu Oki (沖 進(おき すすむ)) - Chief mechanic of SS-99.
- Goro Oki (沖 五郎) - Deputy officer of Oki ocean lab.
- Juzou Oki (沖 重造(おき じょうぞう)) - Head of Oki ocean lab.
- Kizuku Oyama (大山 築(おおやま きづく)) - Captain of SS-99.
- Miyuki Moriki (森木 深雪(もりき みゆき)) - SS-99 analyzer.
- Torakichi Tanuki (田貫 虎吉(たぬき とらきち))- Deputy captain of SS-99.

=== Ocean Empire ===
- Hell Deathbird (ヘル･デスバード) - Military leader of the Ocean Empire. He eventually took over the leadership of Ocean Empire.
- Ze Strait (ゼ･ストレート) - Hell Deathbird's secretary.
- Ze Stronestro (ゼ･ストロネストロ) - A Water World Men captain for Ze Stron and Ze Stroger. He also commanded the X-0 submarine.
- Ze Stron (ゼ･ストロン) - Male agent working for Ze Stronestro.
- Ze Stroger (ゼ･ストロガー) - Female agent working for Ze Stronestro.
- Zelbert (ゼルベルト) - A military officer serving under Hell Deathbird. Later in the war, he planned to stage a coup again Deathbird, but failed.
- Queen Ze Violencia (クイーン･ゼ･ヴィオレンシア) - Ruler of Ocean Empire. Her leader role was taken over by Hell Deathbird when he declared himself as emperor of Ocean Empire, resulting in Violencia's confinement.
- Yanna (ヤーナ)

=== Others ===
- Unidentified SS-99 couple - A male and a female SS-99 officers that resemble Susumu and Miyuki respectively, but with Water World Men skins. They appear in the epilogue section of episode 13, inside the space-bound SS-99.

== Vehicles ==
=== Japan ===
- SS-99 - The experimental submarine built underneath Oki's Ocean Lab. The ship was named after the family's type-99 rifle. SS-99 uses the experimental "L-type engine" that does not give off radiation. The phase 2 of L-type engine enables SS-99 to fly. 30 years after the war, SS-99 was upgraded to fly in space.
- Kairyumaru - Japanese survey ship in episode 1. She is slightly damaged by a near miss in episode 1 before returning to base.
- Kuroshio (黒潮) - A survey submarine carried by Kairyumaru.
- Botao (波濤) - A Kongō class destroyer protecting Kairyumaru in episode 1; she is disabled by torpedo fired from a submarine of the Ocean Empire.

=== America ===
- K-6 - A Diesel-powered training submarine; she is destroyed by X-187 in episode 2.

=== Ocean Empire ===
- X-187 - Submarine appeared in episode 2, and destroyed by SS-99 in episode 3.
- X-0 - Submarine appeared in episode 3.
- Z-type - A type of aircraft carrying submarine developed by Juzou Oki while working for Hell.
- Emperor flagship (皇帝旗艦) - Hell Deathbird's flagship.

== Episodes ==
| Number | Japanese title | English titile |
| 1 | | A Deep Sea Explorer Disappeared! |
| 2 | | Scramble, the Super Submarine! |
| 3 | | Battle at 39,600 feet (12,100 m) Deep! |
| 4 | | The Ambush Achieved Great Success! |
| 5 | | Challenge of a Young Warrior |
| 6 | | Hold-Up |
| 7 | | A Booby Trap! |
| 8 | | Coronation of Emperor is Declared! |
| 9 | | Decision of a Great General |
| 10 | | Blast the Ocean Empire! |
| 11 | | Farewell, the Great General! |
| 12 | | Decisive Battle |
| 13 | | Embark to a New Ocean! |
