= Makio Inoue =

Japanese actor and voice actor (1938–2019)

- 井上 真樹夫
- Born: Takao Inoue (井上 孝夫); November 30, 1938; Yamanashi Prefecture, Japan
- Died: November 29, 2019 (aged 80); Chiba Prefecture, Japan
- Occupations: Actor; voice actor
- Years active: 1954–2019
- Agent: Aoni Production
- Notable credits: Captain Harlock as Captain Harlock; Lupin III as Goemon Ishikawa XIII
- Height: 165 cm (5 ft 5 in)

Takao Inoue (井上 孝夫, Inoue Takao; Inoue Makio) November 30, 1938 – November 29, 2019, known professionally by his stage name Makio Inoue (井上 真樹夫), was a Japanese actor and voice actor.

He is most well known for his longstanding roles as Captain Harlock in Captain Harlock from 1978 through the 1980s and 1990s and Goemon Ishikawa XIII in Lupin III from 1977 to 2011.

== Career ==
Having grown up watching mobile theater troupes, Inoue dreamed of becoming an actor; by the time he was in high school, he was appearing in television movies. He also admired poets, and derived his stage name, Makio, from his pen name at the time.

Around 1960, he and a friend founded a theater company influenced by Underground culture and began working as stage actors. However, due to financial difficulties maintaining the theater, he decided that he had to earn money. It was then that he was invited by an acquaintance to audition for the Japanese dub of the television series The Many Loves of Dobie Gillis and was chosen for the lead role, which was the beginning of his career as a voice actor.

In 1968, he voiced Mitsuru Hanagata in the animated television series Star of the Giants. His role in the anime was well-received, and he was given more opportunities to play cool, beautiful young men and the main character's rivals.

By the 1970s, he had established an idol-like popularity that led to the establishment of a fan club and was considered one of the "top three most popular voice actors in Japan.

Starting in 1977, he voiced Goemon Ishikawa XIII in the Lupin III series, which became one of his best-known roles. Inoue was hired to replace Chikao Ohtsuka, but was told by the director at the time that the character of Goemon had changed from Chikao's "hard-killing man" to a "young, beautiful-faced swordsman" and that the voice actor had changed to him. Inoue thus gave his own personality to the character, without being conscious of Chikao's. Inoue later said affectionately of Goemon, "He is an important character who has influenced me in many ways in my life". He also said that the best part of acting is "giving a presence from a few lines".

He voiced the titular character in Captain Harlock from 1978 through the 1990s.

In the 1980s, as his popularity began to wane, he scaled back his voice acting activities and began to focus more on his stage career. He later became a buddhist monk and built his own temple in Chiba Prefecture. In addition to his work as an actor and voice actor, including voicing Master Eraqus in the Kingdom Hearts series, he began to go on regular training trips, including retreats deep into the mountains to sit in zazen meditation in order to attain enlightenment. Since then, he wore samue and geta to recordings and visited studios on a moped motorcycle.

In 2011, Inoue dropped the role of Goemon at the request of the production company, being succeeded in the role by Daisuke Namikawa.

In the 2000s, he began a relationship with dancer Sui-sei, whom he met through stage work. In 2017, he opened a Twitter account and resumed his interactions with his former fans; in 2019, he launched a "lifetime project" and a YouTube channel.

On November 29, 2019, Inoue died at his home in Chiba Prefecture due to worsening angina pectoris, a chronic illness, at the age of 80.

== Filmography ==
=== Television animation ===
1960s

- Astro Boy (1963)
- Big X (1964)
- The Amazing 3 (1965)
- Kimba the White Lion (1965)
- Princess Knight (1967) (Prince Frank)
- Sabu to Ichi Torimono Hikae (1968) (Sabu)
- Star of the Giants (1968) (Mitsuru Hanagata)

1970s

- Attack No. 1 (1970) (Mitamura)
- Andersen Stories (1971) (Travelling Companion)
- Wandering Sun (1971) (Fanny)
- Devilman (1972) (Iwao Himura/Himmler)
- The Gutsy Frog (1972) (Hanagata)
- Babel II (1973) (Aoki)
- Brave Raideen (1975) (Riki Jinguuji)
- Candy Candy (1976) (William Albert Ardlay)
- Gaiking (1976) (Peter Richardson)
- Lupin III Part II (1977) (Goemon Ishikawa XIII)
- Space Pirate Captain Harlock (1978) (Captain Harlock)
- Space Carrier Blue Noah (1979) (Jrgens)

1980s

- Honey Honey no Suteki na Bouken (1981) (Phoenix)
- Arcadia of My Youth: Endless Orbit SSX (1982) (Captain Harlock)
- Gyakuten! Ippatsuman (1982) (Minamoto no Yorimitsu)
- Lupin III Part III (1984) (Goemon Ishikawa XIII)
- Lupin III: Goodbye Lady Liberty (1989) (Goemon Ishikawa XIII)

1990s

- Lupin III: Mystery of the Hemingway Papers! (1990) (Goemon Ishikawa XIII)
- Lupin III: Steal Napoleon's Dictionary! (1991) (Goemon Ishikawa XIII)
- Lupin III: From Russia With Love (1992) (Goemon Ishikawa XIII)
- Lupin III: Voyage to Danger (1993) (Goemon Ishikawa XIII)
- Lupin III: Dragon of Doom (1994) (Goemon Ishikawa XIII)
- Lupin III: The Pursuit of Harimao's Treasure (1995) (Goemon Ishikawa XIII)
- Lupin III: The Secret of Twilight Gemini (1996) (Goemon Ishikawa XIII)
- Lupin III: Island of Assassins (1997) (Goemon Ishikawa XIII)
- Lupin III: Crisis in Tokyo (1998) (Goemon Ishikawa XIII)
- Lupin III: The Columbus Files (1999) (Goemon Ishikawa XIII)

2000s

- Lupin III: Missed by a Dollar (2000) (Goemon Ishikawa XIII)
- Lupin III: Alcatraz Connection (2001) (Goemon Ishikawa XIII)
- Lupin III: Episode 0: First Contact (2002) (Goemon Ishikawa XIII)
- Lupin III: Operation: Return the Treasure (2003) (Goemon Ishikawa XIII)
- Lupin III: Stolen Lupin ~ The Copy Cat is a Midsummer's Butterfly~ (2004) (Goemon Ishikawa XIII)
- Samurai Champloo (2004) (Mariya Enshirou)
- Lupin III: An Angel's Tactics – Fragments of a Dream Are the Scent of Murder (2005) (Goemon Ishikawa XIII)
- Lupin III: Seven Days Rhapsody (2006) (Goemon Ishikawa XIII)
- Lupin III: Elusiveness of the Fog (2007) (Goemon Ishikawa XIII)
- Lupin III: Sweet Lost Night ~Magic Lamp's Nightmare Premonition~ (2008) (Goemon Ishikawa XIII)
- Lupin the 3rd vs. Detective Conan (2009) (Goemon Ishikawa XIII)

2010s

- Lupin III: The Last Job (2010) (Goemon Ishikawa XIII)

=== OVA ===
- Area 88 (Charlie)
- Legend of the Galactic Heroes (1989) (Flottillenadmiral Ansbach)
- Queen Emeraldas (1998) (Captain Harlock)
- Lupin III: Return of Pycal (2002) (Goemon Ishikawa XIII)
- Lupin III: Green vs. Red (2008) (Goemon Ishikawa XIII)

=== Theatrical animation ===
- Lupin III: The Mystery of Mamo (1978) (Goemon Ishikawa XIII)
- Lupin III: The Castle of Cagliostro (1979) (Goemon Ishikawa XIII)
- Mobile Suit Gundam: Soldiers of Sorrow (1981) (Slegger Law)
- Mobile Suit Gundam: Encounters in Space (1982) (Slegger Law)
- Lupin III: Legend of the Gold of Babylon (1985) (Goemon Ishikawa XIII)
- Toki no Tabibito -Time Stranger- (1986) (Toshito Kutajima)
- Lupin III: Farewell to Nostradamus (1995) (Goemon Ishikawa XIII)
- Lupin III: Dead or Alive (1996) (Goemon Ishikawa XIII)

=== Video games ===
- Zombie Revenge (1999) (Rikiya Busujima)
- Kessen II (2001) (Cao Cao)
- Kingdom Hearts Birth by Sleep (2010) (Eraqus)
- Kingdom Hearts III (2019) (Eraqus)
- Super Robot Wars T (2019) (Captain Harlock)

=== Tokusatsu ===
- Akumaizer 3 (1975) (Zabitan)

=== Dubbing ===
- The Bridge on the River Kwai (Lieutenant Joyce (Geoffrey Horne))
- The Cassandra Crossing (Major Stark (John Phillip Law))
- Flesh for Frankenstein (Baron Von Frankenstein (Udo Kier))
- Frankenstein Created Woman (1970 TV Asahi edition) (Anton (Peter Blythe))
- The Great Escape (1971 Fuji TV edition) (Lt. Cmdr. Eric Ashley-Pitt (David McCallum))
- The Greatest Story Ever Told (Judas Iscariot (David McCallum))
- Help! (Paul McCartney)
- Kiss of the Vampire (1970 TBS edition) (Carl Ravna (Barry Warren))
- The Magnificent Seven (1974 TV Asahi edition) (Chico (Horst Buchholz))
