= Arei no Kagami =

1985 anime film

- Arei's Mirror: Way to the Virgin Space
- The cover of the VHS release

アレイの鏡 ~ Way to the Virgin Space (Arei's Mirror ~ Way to the Virgin Space)
- Genre: Science fiction
- Anime film
- Directed by: Leiji Matsumoto (Note: Chief Director (総監督).); Kōzō Morishita
- Produced by: Toshio Katsuta
- Written by: Leiji Matsumoto; Mitsuru Majima
- Music by: Yuri Nishimura
- Studio: Toei Animation
- Released: March 16, 1985
- Runtime: 26 minutes
- Manga
- Written by: Leiji Matsumoto
- Published by: Sekai Bunka Publishing
- Published: May 1, 1985
- Volumes: 1
- icon

Arei's Mirror: Way to the Virgin Space (アレイの鏡 〜ウェイ・トゥ・ザ・バージン・スペース〜, Arei no Kagami ~Wei tu za Bājin Spēsu~; also known as Mirror of Halley) was originally created by Leiji Matsumoto as an educational-like video aimed more at children. It used information about Earth and outer space which lead many to believe it as an educational video. It was first shown only as a film in the Expo '85 as part of the World Fair. It was also Leiji Matsumoto's first work with computer graphics in it. The same year it was published a single-volume comic adaptation cured by Sekai Bunkasha.

== Plot ==
The story follows Daichi Meguru and Mayu, a young boy and a pilot, as they flee their war torn planet and into space. Upon their ship a stowaway android named Zero joins their quest as they travel through Halley's Mirror.

== Theme songs ==
"We Will Be One Someday" by Satoko Shimonari
Lyrics: Kayoko Fuyumori
Composed: Yuri Nishimura
"Aoi Mizuumi" by Satoko Shimonari
Lyrics: Kayoko Fuyumori
Composed: Yuri Nishimura

== Cast ==
Daichi Meguru
Keiko Toda
Mayu
Yōko Asagami
Zero
Hideyuki Tanaka
Linne
Hiromi Tsuru
Universal Consciousness
Reiko Mutô

== Media ==
The movie was only shown once and was then released on VHS and VHD. Very few media or products were released, except for a few at the Expo. There has been no DVD or Blu-ray release.

A soundtrack was released as a vinyl record.
