= Chiyoko Kawashima =

Japanese voice actress (born 1954)

- 川島 千代子
- Born: Chiyoko Shimoyama; June 2, 1954 (age 72); Tokyo, Japan
- Occupation: Voice actress
- Years active: 1974–2001
- Agent: Aoni Production
- Notable credits: Sailor Moon as Setsuna Meioh/Sailor Pluto, Haruna Sakurada and Shingo Tsukino; Space Pirate Captain Harlock as Kei Yuki and Mayu; UFO Robo Grendizer as Hikaru Makiba
- Height: 170 cm (5 ft 7 in)

Chiyoko Kawashima (川島 千代子, Kawashima Chiyoko; born Chiyoko Shimoyama (下山 千代子, Shimoyama Chiyoko); June 2, 1954) is a former Japanese voice actress. She was born in Tokyo and retired from voice acting in 2001. Her final role was that of Maron Kusakabe's mother Koron Kusakabe in Phantom Thief Jeanne.

== Filmography ==
- Adieu Galaxy Express 999 as Kei Yuki
- Ai Shite Knight as Meiko Kajiwara
- Asari-chan as Hamano Tatami
- Candy Candy as Patricia O'Brien
- Candy Candy the Movie as Sister Lane
- Cat's Eye as Kazumi
- Greed (OVA) as Iko
- Invincible Super Man Zambot 3 as Hanae Jin, Kazuyuki Kamie, and Aki
- Kaibutsu-kun as Utako Ichikawa
- Phantom Thief Jeanne as Koron Kusakabe (flashbacks; final role before retirement)
- Kimagure Orange Road as Hikaru's mother
- Kiteretsu Daihyakka as Yoshie Sakurai
- Please Save My Earth as Mrs. Kobayashi
- Policenauts as Kris Goldwin and Lorraine Hōjō
- Sailor Moon as Sailor Pluto, Haruna Sakurada and Shingo Tsukino, Derella (episode 7), Utonberino (episode 55), Yamandakka (episode 58)
- Sailor Moon S: The Movie as Sailor Pluto
- Sailor Moon Super S: The Movie as Sailor Pluto
- Saint Seiya as Geist and young Shiryu
- Space Pirate Captain Harlock as Kei Yuki and Mayu
- Stop!! Hibari-kun! as Hiromi Iwasaki
- Tiger Mask II as Midori Ariyoshi
- UFO Robo Grendizer as Hikaru Makiba
- Yawara! as Fujiko Itou
