= Harlock Saga =

1990s manga series starring Captain Harlock

- The Ring of the Nibelung Harlock Saga

ニーベルングの指環 (Nīberungo no Yubiwa) ハーロック・サーガ (Hārokku Sāga)
- Genre: Space opera
- Based on: Space Pirate Captain Harlock by Leiji Matsumoto Der Ring des Nibelungen by Wilhelm Richard Wagner
- Manga

The Ring of the Nibelung: Rheingold
- Written by: Leiji Matsumoto
- Published by: Shinchosha
- Magazine: Various
- Original run: 1990 – 1991
- Volumes: 2
- Manga

The Ring of the Nibelung: Walküre
- Written by: Leiji Matsumoto
- Published by: Shinchosha
- Magazine: Various
- Original run: 1997 – 1998
- Volumes: 3
- Original video animation

Harlock Saga
- Directed by: Yoshio Takeuchi
- Produced by: Jin'ichirō Koyama; Tōru Nakano
- Written by: Kei Hiyoshi
- Music by: Kaoru Wada
- Studio: Studio March
- Released: January 25, 1999 – November 25, 1999
- Runtime: 30 minutes (each)
- Episodes: 6
- Manga

The Ring of the Nibelung: Siegfried
- Written by: Leiji Matsumoto
- Published by: Shinchosha
- Magazine: Weekly Comic Bunch
- Original run: May 2001 – November 2001
- Volumes: 3
- Manga

The Ring of the Nibelung: Götterdämmerung
- Written by: Leiji Matsumoto
- Published by: Shinchosha
- Magazine: Weekly Comic Bunch
- Original run: 2001 – 2002 (canceled)

The Ring of the Nibelung (ニーベルングの指環, Nīberungo no Yubiwa) is a manga series written and illustrated by Leiji Matsumoto. A loose adaptation of Wilhelm Richard Wagner epic music drama Der Ring des Nibelungen, it tells the story of space pirate Captain Harlock and his crew as they try to stop a man who has stolen gold from the center of the galaxy and forged it into a powerful ring. It was adapted into a six-part original video animation series titled Harlock Saga (ハーロック・サーガ, Hārokku Sāga).

== Overview of the manga ==
The Ring of the Nibelung manga, like many of Leiji Matsumoto's works, remains unfinished. Eight volumes were published (both in Japanese by Shinchosha and in French by Kana Press). The first series, Rheingold (2 volumes), was the basis for the Harlock Saga OVA series.

Walküre (3 volumes) is the second of a four-part story dealing largely with the events surrounding the epic voyage and subsequent death of Francis "Great" Harlock, Captain Harlock's father, in 2964 AD. The story begins immediately after the events depicted in Rheingold. Wotan, lord of the gods of Valhalla, is furious over Captain Harlock's earlier appearance in Valhalla and his insolence toward himself as lord of the gods. Wotan does not care that Harlock has just gotten through saving Valhalla (and Wotan's hide); he wishes the whole affair had never happened. To that end he orders his daughter Brunhilde and her cohorts, the legendary Valkyries, on a journey back through time with orders to kill Harlock while he is still a youth. In order to accomplish her mission Brunhilde must cross swords with Great Harlock, the father of the boy she has been sent back in time to kill. The both of them must also deal with the Metanoids (who make their first appearance here in a Matsumoto story), who have designs of their own for the universe that do not take into account the gods of Valhalla. Caught up in this storm of events are four singular young people. First is young Harlock (or "Little Harlock" as his father calls him), a teenager who has a great destiny ahead of him but must first live long enough to achieve it. Second is young Tochiro Oyama, young Harlock's best friend and the spitting image of his famous father Dr. Oyama in looks, personality, and intelligence. Third is young Emeraldas, who along with her younger sister Maetel have chanced upon an ancient starship of great power on the planet Metabloody that awaits "...its rightful master". Fourth is young Maetel herself, mysterious even as a child, who seems strangely attracted to young Harlock and correctly senses that the destinies of all four of them are bound together by the strands of time upon the eternal Sea of Stars.

Siegfried (3 volumes) is the third of a four-part story dealing with the adventures of Great Harlock. It is also set in the year 2964 AD and covers the events leading up to the death of Great Harlock. The Metanoids are planning to conquer the known universe and have built a fleet of sophisticated warships, the likes of which have never been seen before. All that stands between them and their goal is an unlikely alliance of mortal and immortal: Great Harlock, the legendary space pirate, who sails the Sea of Stars in the second incarnation of his space battleship Death Shadow; and Brunhilde the Valkyrie, shieldmaiden of Valhalla, who has defied her father's orders to kill Great Harlock's son and joined forces with him under the flag of freedom, the skull-and-crossbones of old. Witnessing this great (and tragic) event unfold are Miime the Nibelung sorceress and four youths who as adults are destined to shape the future of the universe. The manner in which Great Harlock and Brunhilde face the impending threat of the Metanoids, one that will certainly result in both of their deaths, will make a lasting impression on the young lives who must deal with their willing sacrifice.

Götterdämmerung (no volumes, on hiatus) picks up the story almost a decade after the death of Great Harlock. Miime, now serving Captain Harlock aboard the mighty space battleship Arcadia, has just finished telling him the full story behind the death of his father. Now that he understands the extent of Wotan's involvement in the affair Captain Harlock is aroused to wrath. Together with his ally Emeraldas he dares to defy Wotan once again and challenge Valhalla's rule over the universe. His actions have been foreseen by Erda the soothsayer, who had earlier predicted that Wotan's attempt to change Harlock's past would result in the Twilight of the Gods and the end of Valhalla. Now that prophecy is coming true, and even as Captain Harlock finishes resolving the legacy of his late father, cosmic forces array themselves for a final showdown at the center of the universe. For some, it will almost certainly mean the end of all things; for others, perhaps, a beginning.

== Overview of the anime ==
Legend tells of the Rheingold, an all-powerful metal used by the gods of Valhalla during the forging of the universe. Legend says that the one who wields the Rheingold wields ultimate power over all things. The Nibelheim, former servants of Valhalla who were cast down aeons ago for daring to defy the gods, are once again fomenting a rebellion. Their leader Alberich is on a ruthless quest for the Rheingold and will let nothing stand in the way of his desire to utterly crush Wotan and the gods of Valhalla. Fearing the implications of his actions, his sister Miime, currently in the service of the space pirate Captain Harlock, warns her friend about Alberich's plans. Together with fellow space pirate Emeraldas, his best friend Tochiro Oyama, and Maetel the eternal traveler, Captain Harlock sets out to thwart Alberich's designs and save the universe - not for the gods, but for all the living beings it contains.

== Cast ==
Harlock Saga cast
Role	Japanese	English
Role	Japanese	TAJ Productions
Captain Harlock	Kōichi Yamadera	Matt Hoverman
Tochirou Ooyama	Kōichi Yamadera	J. David Brimmer
Miime	Kazuko Yanaga	Jill Seifers
Tadashi Daiba	Toshihiko Seki	Scott Rayow
Yattaran	Shigeru Chiba	Matthew Sussman (as Yatran)
Alberich	Yoshito Yasuhara	Greg Abbey
Fafner	Shin'ichiro Miki	Scott Rayow
Fasolt	Takehito Koyasu	Jay Snyder
Freya	Emi Shinohara	Kathleen McInerney
Fricka	Miyuki Ueda	Rachael Lillis
Wotan	Tarou Ishida	Robert O'Gorman
Emeraldas	Masako Katsuki	Kathleen McInerney
Erda	K	Carol Jacobanis (as Elda)
Maetel	Masako Ikeda	Lisa Ortiz
Valkyrie Captain	Kumiko Hironaka	Tara Jayne-Sands
Computer	Kouichi Sakaguchi	Tony Salerno
