= Leiji Matsumoto =

Japanese manga artist (1938–2023)

- 松本零士
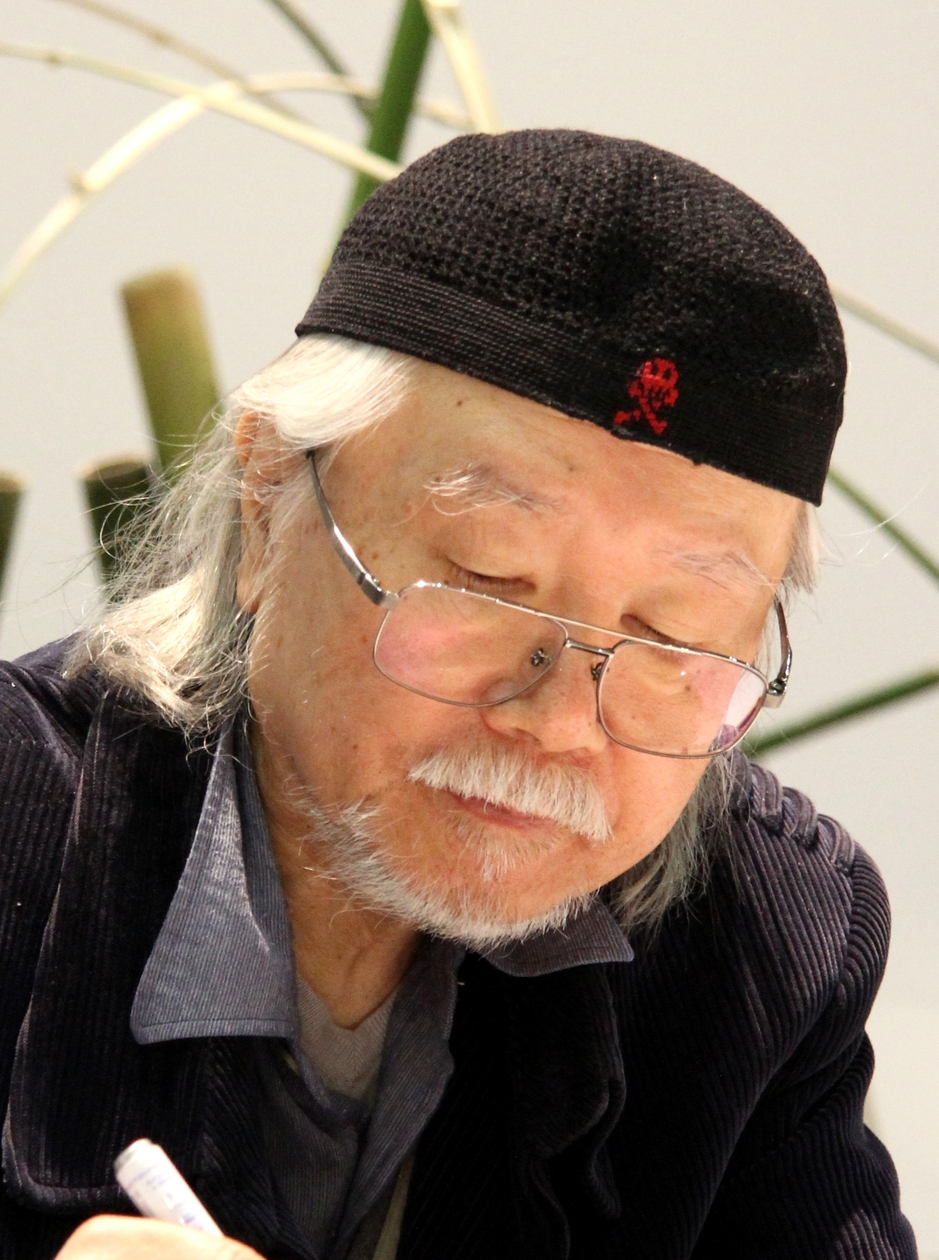
- Matsumoto signing books in 2014
- Born: Akira Matsumoto; January 25, 1938; Kurume, Fukuoka Prefecture, Empire of Japan
- Died: February 13, 2023 (aged 85); Tokyo, Japan
- Known for: Character design, illustration
- Notable work: Space Battleship Yamato; Space Pirate Captain Harlock; Galaxy Express 999
- Spouse: Miyako Maki
- Children: Makiko Matsumoto
- Awards: Medal with Purple Ribbon (2001); Order of the Rising Sun (2010); Ordre des Arts et des Lettres (2012)
- Website: leiji-matsumoto.ne.jp

Leiji Matsumoto (Japanese: 松本零士, Hepburn: Matsumoto Reiji; born Akira Matsumoto (松本晟); January 25, 1938 – February 13, 2023) was a Japanese manga artist, and creator of several anime and manga series. He was best known for masterminding legendary franchises, such as Space Battleship Yamato, Space Pirate Captain Harlock, and Galaxy Express 999. His style was characterized by mythological and often tragic storylines with strong moral themes, noble heroes, feminine heroines, and a love of strange worlds and melancholic atmosphere.

He received Medal with Purple Ribbon in 2001, Order of the Rising Sun in 2010 and Ordre des Arts et des Lettres in 2012.

== Early and personal life ==
Akira Matsumoto was born on January 25, 1938, in Kurume, Fukuoka Prefecture. He was the middle child of his family of seven brothers. His father was an elite pilot in Imperial Japanese Army Academy, who witnessed the tragic destruction of his country and the psychological shockwave of Battleship Yamato's sinking. In his early childhood, Matsumoto was given a 35mm film projector by his father, and watched American cartoons during Asia-Pacific War. During this time, he gained an interest in science fiction novels by authors Unno Juza and H. G. Wells.

Matsumoto started drawing at the age of 6, and then, prior to the end of war, he began drawing manga by three years later after seeing the works of Osamu Tezuka. At age 18, he moved to Tokyo to become a manga artist.

Matsumoto was married to manga artist and Licca-chan creator Miyako Maki. The couple have one daughter, Makiko.

== Career ==
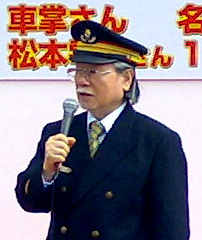
Leiji Matsumoto as the honorary stationmaster of Ōizumi-gakuen Station in 2008

In 1954, Matsumoto made his debut under his real name, Akira Matsumoto, with Mitsubachi no bōken in the magazine Manga Shōnen.

Matsumoto's big break came with Otoko Oidon, a series that chronicled the life of a rōnin (a young man preparing for university entrance exams), in 1971. In 1972, he created a mature-themed dark comedy Western seinen series Gun Frontier for Play Comic magazine, which ran from 1972 to 1975. Around the same time, he started a series of unconnected short stories set during World War II, Senjo Manga Series, which would eventually become popular under the title The Cockpit.

He was involved in Space Battleship Yamato (1974), and created a highly popular series Space Pirate Captain Harlock (1977) and Galaxy Express 999 (1977). In 1978, he was awarded a Shogakukan Manga Award for shōnen for Galaxy Express 999 and Senjo Manga Series. He also won the 6th Seiun Award in 1979 for Space Battleship Yamato. Animated versions of Captain Harlock and Galaxy Express 999 are set in the same universe, which spawned several spin offs and related series, most notably Queen Emeraldas and Queen Millennia.

In 2003, Matsumoto supervised the creation of several music videos for French house group Daft Punk, set to tracks from their album Discovery. These videos were issued end-to-end (making a full-length animated movie) on a DVD release titled Interstella 5555: The 5tory of the 5ecret 5tar 5ystem.

Approximately two dozen bronze statues – each four feet tall – of characters and scenes from Space Battleship Yamato and Galaxy Express 999 were erected in the downtown area of Tsuruga in 1999. Each statue includes a plaque at its base explaining the character and features Matsumoto's signature.

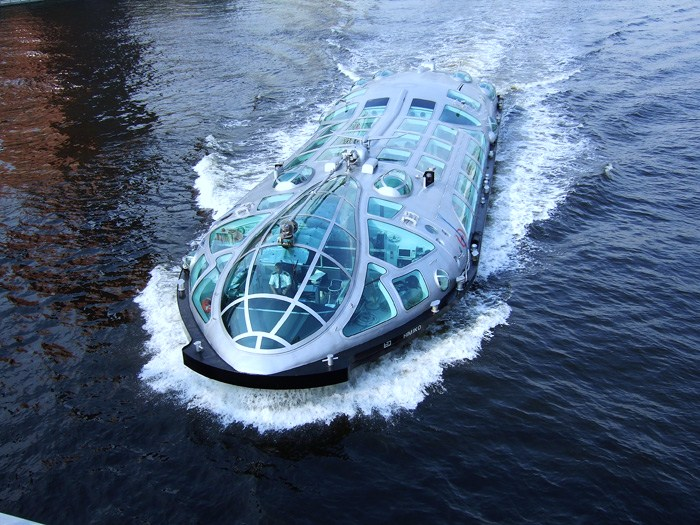
Himiko, a Tokyo Cruise Ship water bus designed by Leiji Matsumoto

Matsumoto worked with Yoshinobu Nishizaki on Space Battleship Yamato (known outside Japan under various names, but most commonly as Star Blazers). Matsumoto created a manga loosely based on the series, and Yamato makes cameo appearances (sans crew) in several of his works including Galaxy Express 999 manga.

Later, his work was called Great Yamato, featuring an updated Yamato was renamed Great Galaxy due to legal issues with Nishizaki. As of 2009, Matsumoto and Nishizaki were both working on independent anime projects featuring the acclaimed Space Battleship Yamato, with the conditions that Matsumoto cannot use the name Yamato, plot, or characters from the original, and Nishizaki cannot use the conceptual art, character, or ship designs of the original.

In August 2014, to celebrate 60th anniversary of his debut, Matsumoto launched the manga Captain Harlock: Jigen Kōkai (Captain Harlock: Dimensional Voyage), illustrated by Kōichi Shimahoshi, in the pages of Akita Shoten's Champion Red magazine. Dimensional Voyage is a retelling of the original 1978 Space Pirate Captain Harlock manga. It had been licensed in the United States by Seven Seas Entertainment.

== Health problems and death ==
On November 15, 2019, Matsumoto suffered from severe respiratory problems and collapsed during an event in Turin, Italy, for 40th-anniversary tour celebrating Captain Harlock anime adaptation. He was taken to the hospital in critical condition and had a breathing tube inserted after he was admitted to emergency unit. However, he was considered to be out of danger at two days later.

Matsumoto died of acute heart failure at a hospital in Tokyo on February 13, 2023, at the age of 85.

=== Tributes ===
Various manga artists offered condolences, including Yasuhiro Nightow, Nozomu Tamaki, and his wife, Miyako Maki. Galaxy Express 999 voice actress Masako Nozawa and translator Zack Davisson both also gave their own condolences.

In February 2024, Matsumoto was posthumously awarded the Contribution Award in the 44th Nihon SF Taisho Awards by Science Fiction and Fantasy Writers of Japan (SFWJ).

== Style and themes ==
=== Narrative structure ===
Matsumoto's stories are influenced by the Bildungsroman tradition (i.e., tales of formative education and self-discovery). Scholar Darren-Jon Ashmore notes that Matsumoto viewed his own space opera sagas, such as Galaxy Express 999 and Captain Harlock, as narratives of growth and transformation, where characters "make choices for themselves and others, giving up much of themselves so that a greater goal is served." Ashmore further explains that Matsumoto was inspired by classic works like Charles Dickens's A Christmas Carol and Margaret Mitchell's Gone with the Wind, focusing on characters who are "initially the product of their times and circumstances, but ultimately come to be masters of their own fate." The concept of "Arcadia", an idealized, lost paradise of youth, is a recurring motif, stemming from Matsumoto's engagement with Johann Wolfgang von Goethe's Italian Journey.

A core philosophical concept in Matsumoto's interconnected "Leijiverse" is toki-no-wa (the wheel of time), representing a cyclical view of history and destiny where heroes and events echo across ages. Ashmore describes this as a reflection of both Buddhist concepts of rebirth and Norse cosmology, where characters function as "eternal champions" navigating repeated epochs of conflict and renewal. This cyclical nature allows for a mutable, non-linear canon where stories and character relationships are constantly re-explored and redefined across different manga and anime adaptations. Central themes across his work include a resistance to societal apathy and conformity, a melancholic nostalgia for a lost heroic past, and the sacrifice of the individual for a greater, often cosmic, purpose.

=== Female characters ===
Matsumoto's female characters, while visually distinctive with their tall, willowy designs and long hair, often occupy narrow narrative roles reflective of 1970s Japanese gender norms. Scholar Stefanie Thomas analyzes that in his early space operas (Space Pirate Captain Harlock, Galaxy Express 999, Queen Emeraldas), female characters are statistically scarce among main casts and frequently conform to archetypes identified by sociologist Kimio Ito: the object of worship ("the Madonna"), the provider of sexual relations ("the prostitute"), and the source of nurturing ("the great mother"). Thomas argues that while characters like the navigator Kei Yuki demonstrate professional competence, they are often tasked with "emotional labor" to soothe male egos, and female antagonists like the Mazone or Queen Prometheum are portrayed as threatening "Others" who reject traditionally feminine-coded empathy. Matsumoto stated that his female designs were inspired by the German actress Marianne Hold and by "spirited women" from his youth in Kyushu, whom he described as headstrong at home but observant of social proprieties in public.

=== Visual style ===
Matsumoto's artistic style is characterized by highly detailed mechanical designs, especially for spaceships, which incorporate numerous analog dials and gothic elements. His visual approach to characters creates a stark contrast between the delicate, elegant designs of his young women and the more grotesque or comedic appearance of secondary characters. The design of his female characters was refined in collaboration with his wife, manga artist Miyako Maki.

== Selected works ==
Name	Year	Role(s)	Ref.
Arcadia of My Youth	1982	Story	
Arcadia of My Youth: Endless Orbit SSX	1982–1983	Story	
Arei no Kagami	1985	Story	
Barairo no tenshi	1964		
Captain Harlock: Dimensional Voyage	2014	Story	
Cosmo Warrior Zero	2001	Story	
Dokuganryū Masamune ~Sengoku no Arcadia Gaiden~	2019		
Fire Force DNA Sights 999.9	1998		
Galaxy Express 999	1977–1981	Story	
Ganso Dai Yojohan Dai Monogatari	1970	Story	
Great Yamato	2000–2001		
Great Yamato No. Zero	2004–2007	Story	
Gun Frontier	1972–1975	Story	
Gun Frontier ~Harlock & Tochirō Seishun no Tabi~	2017		
Harlock Saga	1998–1999	Story	
Interstella 5555: The 5tory of the 5ecret 5tar 5ystem by Daft Punk	2003	Production; Supervisor	
Leiji Matsumoto Anime Masterpiece Theatre	1980		
Maetel Legend	2000	Story	
Maeterlinck's Blue Bird: Tyltyl and Mytyl's Adventurous Journey	1980	Character; Designer	
Marine Snow no Densetsu	1980		
Miraizer Ban	1976–1978		
Mystery Eve	1970		
Otoko Oidon	1971–1973		
Out of Galaxy Gin no Koshika	2009		
Ozuma	2012	Story	
Planet Robot Danguard Ace	1977–1978	Story	
Queen Emeraldas	1978–1979	Story	
Queen Millennia	1980–1983	Story	
Saint Elmo – Hikari no Raihousha	1986	Credited	
Senjo Manga series	1973–1978		
Sexaroid	1968–1970		
Sexaroid 4	2017		
Shishunki 100 Man-nen	1972–1973		
Space Battleship Yamato	1974		
Space Pirate Captain Harlock	1977–1979	Story	
Space Symphony Maetel	2004–2005	Producer	
Starzinger	1978–1979	Story	
Submarine Super 99	1970–1972	Story	
The Cockpit	1993	Story	
The Galaxy Railways	2003–2007	Producer	
The Ultimate Time Sweeper Mahoroba	1993–1998		
Torajima no Mii me	1999	Story	
