= Maetel Legend =

2000 anime OVA

- DVD cover of the Maetel Legend OVA

メーテルレジェンド (Mēteru Rejendo)
- Genre: Science fiction
- Created by: Leiji Matsumoto
- Original video animation
- Directed by: Yōsuke Kuroda
- Produced by: Tomoyuki Imai; Takaji Matsudo; Yuri Nunokawa; Hitoshi Yagi
- Written by: Leiji Matsumoto
- Music by: Masamichi Amano
- Studio: Vega Entertainment
- Licensed by: U.S. Manga Corps (USA)
- Released: November 19, 2000 – April 22, 2001
- Runtime: 51–60 minutes
- Episodes: 3
- Anime television series

Space Symphony Maetel
- Directed by: Osamu Kasai
- Produced by: Ryōsuke Takahashi; Kenji Shimizu; Yoshitake Suzuki
- Written by: Mugi Kamio
- Music by: Ichiro Nitta
- Studio: Azeta Pictures
- Original network: Animax (PPV Premier)
- Original run: August 5, 2004 – June 20, 2005
- Episodes: 13

Maetel Legend (メーテルレジェンド, Mēteru Rejendo) is a 2000 anime OVA based on characters created by Leiji Matsumoto about how the planet La Maetelle becomes the planet Andromeda, also known as Planet Maetel ("the mechanized world"). It serves a link between Matsumoto's previous series Queen Millennia and Galaxy Express 999. The OVA and series are supposed to follow 1981 TV series Queen Millennia chronologically, and are prequels to 1979 film Galaxy Express 999.

== Cast ==
Maetel Legend cast
Role	Japanese	English
Maetel	Satsuki Yukino	Lisa Ortiz
Dark Hornet	Koichi Chiba	Dan Woren
Gracey	Takashi Taniguchi	Joshua Popenoe
Boingo the Jester	Takeshi Uchida	Sean Schemmel
Priest	Hiroshi Arikawa	David Logan Rankin
Samuel	Kōichi Kitamura	Willam Roberts
Dr. Ban	Shinji Ogawa	Jeremy Schwartz
