= Gun Frontier (manga) =

Japanese manga and anime series

- Cover of the first volume of the manga

ガン フロンティア (Gan Furontia)
- Genre: Western, buddy comedy
- Manga
- Written by: Leiji Matsumoto
- Published by: Akita Shoten
- Magazine: Play Comic
- Original run: 1972 – 1975
- Volumes: 3
- Novel

Gun Frontier II
- Written by: Leiji Matsumoto
- Published by: Daiwa Shobo
- Published: April 1999
- Anime television series
- Directed by: Sōichirō Zen
- Produced by: Kōki Okagawa; Tomoyuki Imai; Toshiharu Namiki
- Written by: Doctor Serial Nishioka
- Music by: Hiroshi Motokura
- Studio: Vega Entertainment
- Licensed by: US: Discotek Media
- Original network: AT-X
- English network: US: Anime Network
- Original run: March 28, 2002 – June 20, 2002
- Episodes: 13

Gun Frontier (ガン フロンティア, Gan Furontia) is a 1972 manga by Leiji Matsumoto. It introduces Tochiro Oyama, best friend to Matsumoto's classic hero, Captain Harlock, who is in turn depicted as a gunslinger in the Old West. In sharp contrast to other Matsumoto's stories, Gun Frontier is a comedy adventure rather than a space opera. Also, unlike other Harlock stories, in Gun Frontier, Harlock is depicted as Tochiro's sidekick.

The manga follows Sea Pirate Captain Harlock and the samurai Tochiro, who arrive in the United States on the Western Frontier, known also as Gun Frontier. Along with a mysterious woman they meet along the way, the two friends challenge sex rings, bandits, and corrupt sheriff. They are searching for a lost clan of Japanese immigrants, and they will tear Gun Frontier from end to end until they find it.

Since the original manga, there has been a novel and a 2002 anime adaption of the series.

== Characters ==
Tochiro Oyama

Voiced by: Kappei Yamaguchi (Japanese); Derek Stephen Prince (English)
The main character of the story, Tochiro is one of the survivors of Samurai Creek, a town of Japanese immigrants who were mysteriously all slaughtered, with only a few exceptions. Tochiro's purpose is to find the scattered remains of his people, no matter who or what he has to destroy to find them. Tochiro is highly skilled in using Shikomizue, but has awful aim with his gun, a fact which is often poked fun at throughout the series. Despite wearing glasses, he refers to himself as "not being able to see past the end of a shovel [he is] holding". He is also abnormally short, as well as bowlegged, and while he wears his cloak he can often avoid a fatal gunshot wound as his attacker would likely have no idea how small or awkwardly shaped he actually is. He is also a heavy drinker.

Franklin Harlock Jr.

Voiced by: Eiji Takemoto (Japanese); Steven Blum (English)
A sea captain turned gunslinger, Franklin owes his life to Tochiro, and therefore takes him to America on his ship. Harlock is a master gunman, a quick draw like no other, and sharp as a tack. He is able to detect that Sinunora is trying to pry him and Tochiro apart for her own unclear reasons. He is loyal to Tochiro. He is also quite enigmatic and silent, often grumbling and dismissing any mention of the past. Harlock has an x-shaped scar on his cheek, which is later revealed to be from a sword duel he and Tochiro had on Harlock's ship while they were still enemies.

Sinunora

Voiced by: Rica Matsumoto (Japanese); Karen Strassman (English)
Sinunora is a woman who joins Tochiro and Harlock at the end of the first episode. Beautiful and capable, she is not the damsel in distress as she is good at using manipulation to get out of traps and get what she wants (it is revealed later in the series that she is an expert on human behavior). It also comes to Harlocks attention that Sinunora gets close to the pair so that she can spy on them and report back to the mysterious "Organization that guides the world" but in truth, she eventually is warmed by Tochiro's struggle and uses her position as their tracker to protect them instead. Her real name is never mentioned, except by a man named Baron De Noir F. Tat Endale, always referred with his full name and title, who is believed to be her husband. He mentions the first part of her name being "Anrei", but it is cut off and her real name is never mentioned again.

Shizuku

Voiced by: Chisa Yokoyama (Japanese); Dorothy Elias-Fahn (English)

Darkmeister is the leader of the "organization" that guides the world. He desires Tochiro and all the other Japanese immigrants so that he can force them into slavery. He wants to use their superior knowledge of metalcraft (known as Stardust Steel) to create unparalleled weapons to use in war to overthrow the American government. His face is never shown, but he is revealed to have incredibly long fingernails. It is also believed that he wears a mask of some kind.

== Printing history ==
In 1975, the original manga series was compiled into three volumes. In 1988, the manga was reprinted and which Leiji Matsumoto added more content into. In 1999, Leiji Matsumoto published his first novel, Gun Frontier II. The novel was published by Daiwa Shobo and was told in a non-erotic way compared to the original manga. The novel is now out of print.

== Anime ==
In 2002, an anime adaptation of the original series aired on AT-X. The opening theme song is called "Style" by Grand Zero, while the ending theme song is called "Ame to Sanbika" by Umeno Yoshizawa.

It started being streamed in the US on Hulu in Fall 2009. In Latin America, it aired through Animax, beginning in July 2006. The title was translated to Frontera sin ley (Lawless Frontier in English), except in Brazil where the original title was kept.

=== Episodes ===
No.	Title	Original release date
1	"Departure to Gun Frontier"; Transliteration: "Gan furontia he no shuppatsu" (Japanese: ガンフロンティアへの出発)	March 28, 2002
2	"Fall of a non-alcoholic town" Transliteration: "Sake no nai machi no hôkai" (Japanese: 酒のない町の崩壊)	April 4, 2002
3	"'Hanging' song in the sand storm" Transliteration: "Dai sajin baniku no uta" (Japanese: 大砂塵馬肉の歌)	April 11, 2002
4	"Killing in the rain" Transliteration: "Ame no koroshi ai" (Japanese: 雨の殺し合い)	April 18, 2002
5	"Praise for the short-legged!" Transliteration: "Ganimata sanka" (Japanese: ガニマタ賛歌)	April 25, 2002
6	"Samurai in the wild" Transliteration: "Kôya no samurai sâberu" (Japanese: 荒野のサムライサーベル)	May 2, 2002
7	"A bedroom in a mirage" Transliteration: "Maboroshi no kei" (Japanese: 幻の閨)	May 9, 2002
8	"Wild Utamaro"; Transliteration: "Wairudo utamaro" (Japanese: ワイルド・ウタマロ)	May 16, 2002
9	"Battle in Grand City"; Transliteration: "Unchishitâ to midarabdo shitei no kettô" (Japanese: ウンチシターとミダランド・シティーの血闘)	May 23, 2002
10	"Rage of a short guy" Transliteration: "Ikari no chibi" (Japanese: 怒りのチビ)	May 30, 2002
11	"Secret Weapon Factory in Jamacity"; Transliteration: "Jyama shitei no matti rokku" (Japanese: ジャマシティのマッチロック)	June 6, 2002
12	"Sitarunen and Gatling Gun"; Transliteration: "Shitarunen" (Japanese: シタルネン)	June 13, 2002
13	"Footprints to future" Transliteration: "Mirai he no ashiato" (Japanese: 未来への足跡)	June 20, 2002
