= Galaxy Express 999 =

1978 manga series and its adaptations

- Cover of the 1994 reprint of the first manga volume

銀河鉄道999(スリーナイン) (Ginga Tetsudō Surī Nain)
- Genre: Space opera
- Manga
- Written by: Leiji Matsumoto
- Published by: Shōnen Gahōsha
- English publisher: NA: Viz Media
- Magazine: Weekly Shōnen King
- English magazine: NA: Animerica
- Original run: January 24, 1977 – November 6, 1981
- Volumes: 18
- Anime television series
- Directed by: Nobutaka Nishizawa
- Written by: Hiroyasu Yamaura; Keisuke Fujikawa; Yoshiaki Yoshida
- Music by: Nozomi Aoki
- Studio: Toei Animation
- Licensed by: NA: Discotek Media (home video) Crunchyroll (streaming)
- Original network: FNS (Fuji TV)
- Original run: September 14, 1978 – March 28, 1981
- Episodes: 113
- Anime film

Galaxy Express 999
- Directed by: Rintaro
- Written by: Shiro Ishimori
- Music by: Nozomi Aoki
- Studio: Toei Animation
- Licensed by: NA: Discotek Media
- Released: August 4, 1979
- Runtime: 130 minutes
- Anime film

Adieu Galaxy Express 999
- Directed by: Rintaro
- Written by: Hiroyasu Yamaura
- Music by: Osamu Shoji
- Studio: Toei Animation
- Licensed by: NA: Discotek Media
- Released: August 1, 1981
- Runtime: 130 minutes
- Anime film

Eternal Fantasy
- Directed by: Konosuke Uda
- Written by: Junki Takegami
- Music by: Susumu Hirasawa
- Studio: Toei Animation
- Licensed by: NA: Discotek Media
- Released: March 7, 1998
- Runtime: 55 minutes
- Manga

Another Story: Ultimate Journey
- Written by: Leiji Matsumoto; Yuzuru Shimazaki (Note: Following Matsumoto's death in 2023, Shimazaki took on the role of writer of the manga.)
- Illustrated by: Yuzuru Shimazaki
- Published by: Akita Shoten
- Magazine: Champion Red
- Original run: March 19, 2018 – February 20, 2025
- Volumes: 7
- Anime film
- Studio: Toei Animation
- Related
- Maetel Legend (OVA); Space Symphony Maetel (TV series)
- icon

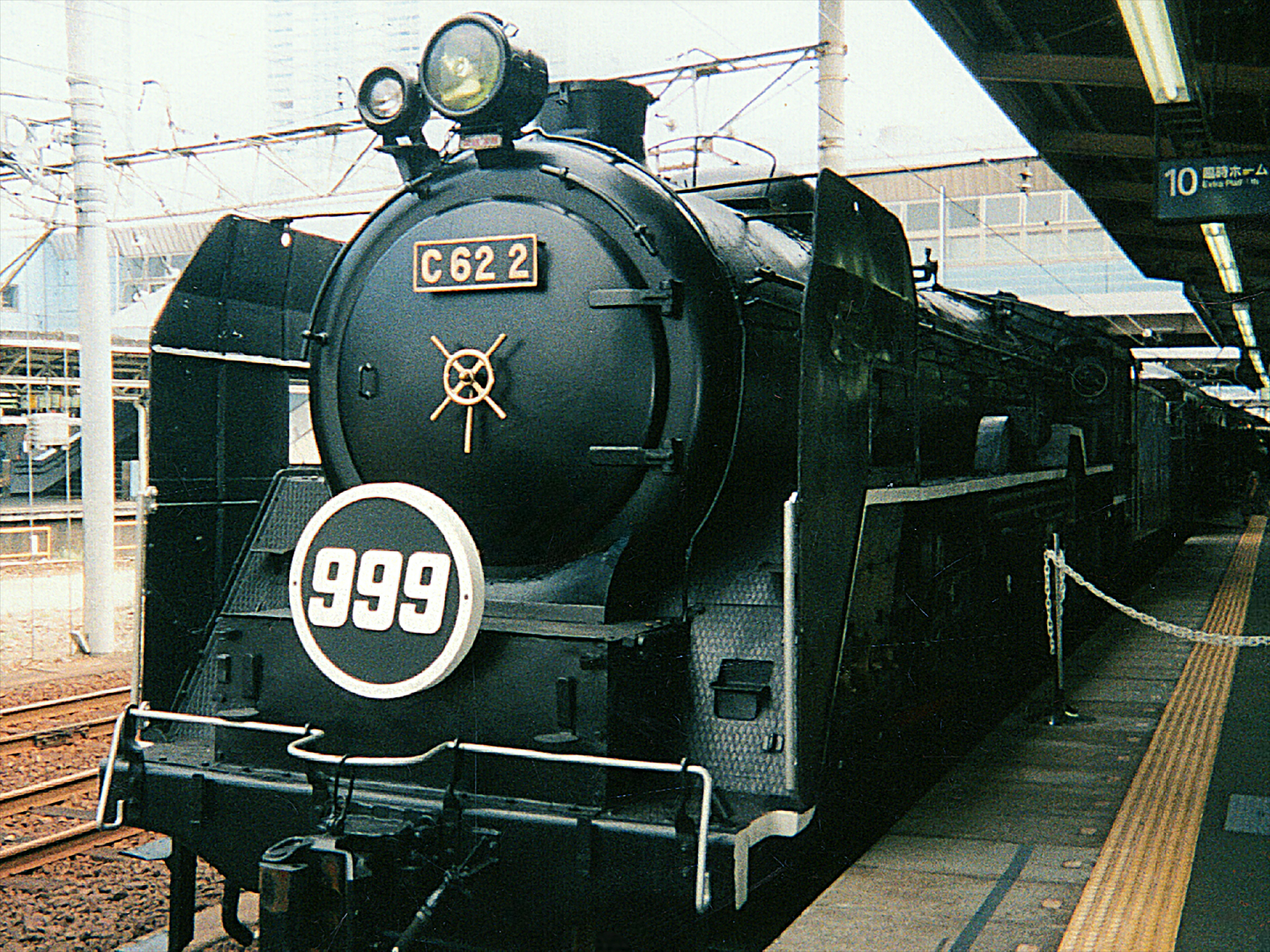
Japanese National Railways Steam locomotive C-62

Galaxy Express 999 (銀河鉄道999(スリーナイン), Ginga Tetsudō Surī Nain; "999" read as "Three Nine") is a Japanese manga series. It is written and illustrated by Leiji Matsumoto, later adapted into a number of anime films and television series. It is set in a spacefaring, high-tech future in which humans have learned how to transfer their minds and emotions with perfect fidelity into mechanical bodies, thus achieving practical immortality.

The manga won the Shogakukan Manga Award for shōnen in 1978. The anime series won the Animage Anime Grand Prix prize in 1981.

Matsumoto was inspired to create Galaxy Express 999 by the idea of a steam train running through the stars in the novel Night on the Galactic Railroad by Kenji Miyazawa.

== Plot ==
=== Anime and manga ===
An impoverished boy named Tetsuro Hoshino desperately wants an indestructible machine body, giving him the ability to live forever and have the freedom that the unmechanized do not have. While machine bodies are impossibly expensive, they are supposedly given away for free on the planet Andromeda, the end of the line for the Galaxy Express 999, a space train that only comes to Earth once a year.

The series begins with Tetsuro and his mother making their way to Megalopolis where they hope to get jobs to pay for passes for the 999. Along the way, however, Count Mecha and a gang of "human hunters" kill Tetsuro's mother. Before she dies, she tells him to continue the journey they started and to get a machine body to live the eternal life she could not. Tetsuro tries to forge on toward the city alone but is quickly overcome by the brutal cold and wind. As he succumbs, he cries out an apology to his mother for failing to fulfill her wish and hopes that in his next life, he will be born as a robot to begin with.

Tetsuro is surprised to awaken by the fireplace in the home of a beautiful woman, Maetel, who is the spitting image of his dead mother. Maetel tells him she had heard the entire incident with a long-range directional microphone she had been idly scanning around the area with. Maetel offers him an unlimited use pass for the 999 if he will be her traveling companion, to which Tetsuro agrees. She provides him with a gun and directs him to the Count's residence, telling him that the Count and his henchmen will be too distracted with their revelries to defend themselves against a surprise attack. Tetsuro bursts in on them in their meeting hall and cuts them down with a spray of gunfire. With the Earth police in hot pursuit, Tetsuro and Maetel flee the planet aboard the 999.

Along the way, Tetsuro has many adventures on many different and exotic planets and meets many kinds of people, both human and alien, living and machine. Increasingly, Tetsuro realizes that a machine body will not fix all of his problems. Most of the machine people (Note: 機械人間 Kikai ningen, often translated, somewhat confusingly, as "cyborg") he meets regret the decision to give up their humanity.

Eventually, Tetsuro and Maetel reach the Planet Promethium, the final stop for the 999. He is shocked by the cruelty and indolence of the machine people there and witnesses a mechanized human committing suicide, an event to which the others react with scoffs and derision. He asks the dying man why he wished to end his life, and is told that eternal life on Promethium is utterly empty of joy or purpose. When Tetsuro mentions the name of his traveling companion, the man is horrified and tells him that Maetel is the daughter of Queen Promethium, the supreme ruler of the Machine Empire (also known as the Mechanization Empire) and that she is thoroughly untrustworthy. Tetsuro is outraged at having been kept in the dark and rushes off to confront Maetel. Maetel is at a loss for words, but a government spokeswoman inserts herself into their conversation and begins giving answers on Maetel's behalf. Tetsuro is not impressed and he storms off in a blind fury (in the anime he is arrested and thrown into the 999).

Tetsuro does not understand why he has been betrayed by Maetel, but Maetel has plans of her own and seeks to destroy the mechanized civilization. With the help of her father, Dr. Ban (only named in the film), whose consciousness resides in a pendant she wears around her neck, Maetel destroys her mother and the planet. Afterward, Maetel and Tetsuro return to the penultimate station on the Planet of Bats where Tetsuro tells Maetel his intention to return to Earth and lead it toward a new future.

Maetel, proud of Tetsuro for his decision to reject mechanization, tells him she has something to take care of and that he should board first, but Tetsuro finds a letter from Maetel telling him that it is time for them to part ways. Maetel had secretly boarded the 777 (three-seven), a nearby train, with the intention of "leading another boy to his future", but it is unclear as to whether or not this means that the Mechanization Empire still exists elsewhere, or if Maetel will lead the boy to some other "future". The series ends as the trains both depart the Planet of Bats.

=== Film versions ===
==== Galaxy Express 999 ====
The film version of Galaxy Express 999 was released in 1979. Maetel and Tetsuro again set out for the home planet of the Mechanization Empire, visiting four planets. Planet Maetel is a mechanized world where machine bodies are made.

Godiego performed the film's theme song "The Galaxy Express 999".

==== Adieu Galaxy Express 999 ====
Adieu Galaxy Express 999 is a 1981 sequel to the film adaptation. Adieu presents an entirely new storyline that takes place three years after the destruction of Planet Maetel. The Machine Empire now has even more of a stranglehold over the Galaxy. Rumors are afoot of Maetel becoming its new Queen. Tetsuro, now a fifteen-year-old freedom fighter, is shocked when a messenger brings him news that the 999 is returning and that Maetel wants him to board it. Tetsuro narrowly makes his way to the 999 and departs Earth, now a battlefield.

Although Tetsuro finds that Maetel is not present on the 999, he does meet Metalmena, a machine woman who has replaced the waitress Claire. Also, a mysterious Ghost Train has been traveling the universe and nearly crashes into 999. The 999 heads to the planet La Metal, portrayed here as the birthplace of Promethium and Maetel. Here Tetsuro helps in the resistance, befriending a cat-like teenage boy named Meowdar. While exploring the ruins of an old castle, Tetsuro discovers a portrait of a beautiful, blonde queen who looks very much like Maetel. He learns that it is, in fact, La Metal's Queen Promethium, even though she looks nothing like she did at their last confrontation. As the 999 departs, Maetel finally makes her appearance.

Shortly after leaving La Metal, the 999 is forced to dock at a station where Tetsuro meets a mysterious machine man named Faust. When Tetsuro attacks him, Faust causes Tetsuro to drop into a flashback where he must relive his mother's death. The 999 continues to the planet Mosaic, the last stop before Great Andromeda, the capital of the Mechanization Empire. Here Tetsuro finds the Ghost Train and is nearly killed.

The 999 finally makes its way to Great Andromeda where Faust greets Tetsuro once more. Meanwhile, Maetel travels down to the center of the planet where Promethium's consciousness still exists. Maetel is put in charge of the Mechanization Empire, just as the rumors said, but again, she intends to put an end to the operations, and attempts to shut Promethium's machinery down. She reveals the horrible truth to Tetsuro that the energy the machine people use is drained from living human beings, and that they were transported there by the Ghost Train. Tetsuro is shocked to find his old friend Meowdar among a pile of dead, drained bodies. Metalmena shows indifference to Meowdar's death until Tetsuro reveals the source of the energy she has been existing on. As a patrol of guards comes to arrest the group, Metalmena, disgusted and enraged by what she has learned, attacks and destroys them, apparently at the cost of her own life.

Promethium proves that she cannot be killed with just the flip of a switch, and all seems hopeless. At about the same time, a space anomaly called Siren the Witch approaches Great Andromeda, attracted to its abundant energy and absorbing all machine energy. With Great Andromeda collapsing, the 999 is set to depart, but Tetsuro must face Faust one last time. After dealing Faust with a fatal blow, it is revealed to Tetsuro that Faust is Tetsuro's father (in the manga and television series, it is never made clear what became of Tetsuro's father). The 999 heads back to La Metal where Maetel and Tetsuro separate for the last time, and "the boy [Tetsuro] becomes a man".

Two songs were written and performed by Mary MacGregor: "Love Light" and the ending theme "Sayonara" were used for the film. Kumiko Kaori recorded a Japanese version of the ending song.

Helen McCarthy in 500 Essential Anime Movies called it a "dense, fascinating story".

==== Upcoming new film ====
A new anime film was announced on July 25, 2026. The film will be produced by Toei Animation.

=== New manga series and Eternal Fantasy ===
In 1996, Matsumoto began a new GE999 series, set a year after the original, in which the Earth is destroyed and Tetsuro sets out to discover the source of the "darkness" that threatens all life in the universe.

The short film Galaxy Express 999: Eternal Fantasy was released in 1998. This film takes place a few years after the events of Adieu Galaxy Express 999, where Maetel and Tetsuro reunite to save the universe again from another evil. It also serves as a link between this film and The Galaxy Railways.

The Alfee performed the theme song "Brave Love: Galaxy Express 999 / Beyond the Win".

Also, space battleship Yamato, from the Japanese show of the same name, and the English version of Star Blazers, which are both Matsumoto creations, make a cameo appearance.

The manga has been partially published in English by Viz. The film was released by Discotek Media on DVD on October 16, 2012, and Blu-ray in 2020. The latter includes a newly produced English dub by Sound Cadence Studios in Dallas, Texas with a new cast.

=== Maetel Legend and Space Symphony Maetel ===
Two-part OVA Maetel Legend serves as a prelude for Galaxy Express 999 and explains the series' backstory. Maetel, the protagonist, is the daughter of Queen Promethium of the Planet La Metal (both from Queen Millennia), a wandering planet, and one of the first civilizations to have mechanized their bodies. As Queen Promethium becomes fearful of the natural decline of her people's lifespan on their freezing world, which has fallen out of orbit, she decides to mechanize them all, in order to enable her people to survive the harsh climate. The complete series was released on DVD by Central Park Media.

Following on from Maetel Legend, TV series Space Symphony Maetel reveals that the newly created machine people of La Metal began to mechanize galaxy after galaxy against the will of many humans, and ended up creating rebellions and revolutions. Maetel is asked to return to La Metal to succeed her mother, only to discover the many hardships her mother has inflicted on the humans.

In this series, Captain Harlock and Emeraldas (Maetel's sister) also appear and work together to assassinate Promethium, along with Maetel. Parallels with Galaxy Express 999 are prevalent. Instead of a boy who wants a mechanized body meeting her, she meets a boy who has a grudge against Promethium and detests being mechanized.

The final lines of dialogue reveal that this is a prequel to the 1979 film Galaxy Express 999.

=== Galaxy Railways: Letter from the Abandoned Planet ===
This OVA series was released from December 30, 2006, to January 5, 2007 (on SKY PerfectTV!) in Japan. The story takes place between Seasons 1 and 2 of Galaxy Railways: Crossroad to Eternity, and presumably after the events of Galaxy Express 999: Eternal Fantasy, where the Earth has since been destroyed. The OVAs featured Maetel, Tetsuro, and the Conductor, with their original voice actors from the Galaxy Express 999 television series.

For unknown reasons, this series started production earlier than Galaxy Railways: Crossroad to Eternity, but was aired much later.

=== Another Story: Ultimate Journey ===
A manga re-telling of the original manga illustrated by Yuzuru Shimazaki began serialization in Akita Shoten's Champion Red magazine on March 19, 2018. The manga was part of a project celebrating Matsumoto's 80th birthday. The future of the manga was unknown due to Leiji Matsumoto's death in 2023, but the manga returned in December 2024 after a two-and-a-half-year hiatus. The manga ended in February 2025.

== Characters ==
- Tetsuro Hoshino (星野 鉄郎, Hoshino Tetsurō): The main character of Galaxy Express 999, Tetsuro is a poor Earth boy who witnessed his mother die at the hands of Count Mecha. With his mother's dying wish being for him to obtain a machine body, Tetsuro embarks on the Galaxy Express with Maetel. Tetsuro has also been mentioned in the 2014 Captain Harlock: Dimensional Voyage manga.
- Maetel (メーテル, Mēteru): The mysterious blonde woman who accompanies Tetsuro on the Galaxy Express 999, Maetel is in actuality the daughter of Queen Promethium, ruler of the Mechanization Empire. In the film version, Maetel is responsible for bringing youths from around the universe to the mechanized homeworld where they are turned into mechanized human components to serve the Mechanization Empire, whereas in the television series, she is grooming them to grow up to become generals in her mother's imperial military. Maetel is secretly plotting with her father, Dr. Ban (who is contained within the pendant around her neck) to destroy the Machine Empire, and finally does so (in the film) when it is Tetsuro's turn to be turned into a bolt. Maetel's soul exists in the body of a human copy, which she occupies until it grows old and she exchanges it for a new one. It is explained in the film version that she occupies a clone of the body of Tetsuro's mother, which explains the resemblance between the two.
- Conductor (車掌, Shashō): The Conductor is the main crew member of the Galaxy Express 999. He is an alien being with an invisible body made of gas; only his eyes can be seen while he is wearing his conductor uniform. The Conductor prefers to go 'strictly by the book' and frequently cites the Galaxy Express rule book, but occasionally ends up bending the rules and getting into adventures with Tetsuro and Maetel.
- Claire (クレア, Kurea): The dining car waitress on the 999, Claire has a machine body made of clear crystal glass. Unlike others who gave up their humanity by choice, Claire was forced into this existence by her vain mother. She works on the 999 in order to save up enough money to buy back her human body, which is stored on Pluto. Claire quickly befriends Tetsuro and sacrifices herself for him when a hallucination taking the guise of his mother tries to pull him out of the train. Her body is shattered, and all that remains is a single glass tear which Tetsuro holds with him as a memento. In the film version, Claire has a somewhat larger role, but suffers the same fate, sacrificing herself for Tetsuro when Promethium tries to kill him (a machine girl named "Mirai" ("Future") has this role in the television series). Claire returns to life in both Eternal Fantasy and the new Galaxy Express manga published by Matsumoto in the 1990s.
- Captain Harlock (キャプテンハーロック, Kyaputen Hārokku) and Emeraldas (エメラルダス, Emerarudasu): Famous space pirates who are idolized by Tetsuro. Both have only minor cameos in the original manga and television series, but have significantly larger roles in the films and assist in defeating the Machine Empire.
- Antares (アンタレス, Antaresu): A well known bandit who sneaks aboard the 999 after their stop on the planet Titan. Antares despises machine people for the death of his wife and has many unexploded bullets lodged within his abdomen. He warns Tetsuro to "shoot first, ask questions later". In the manga and television series he lives in a large home with his many children; in the film he lives on Titan with other bandits and many children orphaned by Count Mecha. In the film version he assists Tetsuro in his quest to kill Count Mecha at the Time Castle, and is killed when the bullets in his body explode after taking multiple shots from the Count.
- Count Mecha (機械伯爵, Kikai-hakushaku): The wealthy machine man who murdered Tetsuro's mother. In the manga and television series, he is a minor aristocrat, and is killed by Tetsuro before he leaves Earth. In the film version he appears to have considerably more power, and rules the Time Castle. Acquiring a machine body to get revenge on Count Mecha is Tetsuro's primary motivation in the film version, and he accomplishes his goal with the assistance of Antares while on the planet Heavy Melder.
- Queen Promethium (プロメシューム, Puromeshūmu): Maetel's mother, and ruler of the Machine Empire. Once a gentle woman, Promethium created the Machine Empire believing it would be good for humanity. Promethium has considerably difference physical characteristics in each of her appearances, appearing as a humanoid in the television series and film, and a two-faced head in the manga. Promethium is destroyed with the destruction of Andromeda in the manga and television series, and killed by Claire in the film version. Her spirit occupies the planet Great Andromeda in Adieu Galaxy Express 999 but perishes when that planet is destroyed by Siren the Witch.

== English-language versions ==
In 1980, Roger Corman produced an English-language dub of the first Galaxy Express 999 film. The film changed the character names (for example changing Tetsuro to Joey and Harlock to Warlock), and removed approximately 30 minutes of content. Antonia Levi, the author of Samurai from Outer Space, said that the edited film, released by New World Pictures, was "heavily edited" and that many otaku fans considered it too damaged to watch.

In 1986, Harmony Gold produced rarely seen English dubs of two of the GE999 television specials, Galaxy Express 999: Can You Live Like a Warrior? and Galaxy Express 999: Can You Love Like a Mother?

In the late 1980s the TV series only aired with English subtitles on the Nippon Golden Network.

The first film was dubbed into English again in 1996 by Viz, titled Galaxy Express 999: The Signature Edition. Released on VHS, this dub was produced by Ocean Studios in Vancouver, British Columbia, and was more true to the source material. Viz also released Adieu, Galaxy Express 999 subbed and dubbed on VHS. They were never released on R1 DVD by the company. For years, the only official English-language release of Galaxy Express 999 material on DVD were a Korean release of the two films which utilizes Viz's subtitle scripts. The English dubs of both films were run regularly on the Canadian channel Space in 1997 and 1998. They were also run in a heavily edited form on the American Sci-Fi Channel.

Viz later released five volumes of the second Galaxy Express manga, which was the basis for the third film, Galaxy Express 999: Eternal Fantasy. The original manga has yet to be officially translated into English.

A subtitled version of the television series was available on IGN's Direct2Drive service. The streaming website Crunchyroll began streaming a subtitled version in January 2009.

DVD versions of both Galaxy Express 999 and Adieu, Galaxy Express 999 were released in the United States on June 28, 2011, by Discotek Media. Both DVDs feature the English subbed and dubbed (Viz dub) versions of the films. Discotek also released "Eternal Fantasy" on DVD on October 16, 2012. It is in Japanese only, but with English subtitles. A Blu-ray release with a newly produced English dub was released in 2020. This dub was produced by Sound Cadence Studios in Dallas, Texas with a new cast.

The television series was licensed for a subtitled North American home video release by S'more Entertainment in 2012 as one their first anime releases.

Discotek Media released three Blu-ray sets for the entire series. They contain a new upscale that preserves more detail and grain, in contrast to Toei Company's Blu-ray boxes that showed smeared colors to make the picture look smooth. Discotek's first collection, titled Departure, which contains episodes 1–39, was released on December 24, 2019, followed by Layover on July 28, 2020, which contains episodes 40–76 and includes the TV special Can You Live Like a Warrior?, whose Harmony Gold dub has been restored for this release. The third collection Terminus was released on September 29, 2020. It contained episodes 77–113 along with TV specials Eternal Wanderer Emeraldas and Can You Love Like a Mother?, the latter's dub also being restored.

== Publication history ==
- First manga series (Andromeda edition) serialized in Shōnen King (Shōnen Gahosha), 1977–1981
- New manga series (Eternal edition) serialized in Big Gold (Shogakukan), 1996–1999
- TV series, 113 episodes + 4 TV specials (1978)
- Television specials, Can You Live Like A Warrior (1979), Emeraldes the Eternal Wanderer (1980) and Can You Love Like a Mother (1980)
- Film, Galaxy Express (1979)
- Featurette, Galaxy Express 999 Glass no Clair – Glass-made Claire (1980)
- Film, Adieu Galaxy Express 999 Terminus Andromeda – Sayonara Galaxy Express 999 (1981)
- Film, Galaxy Express 999 ~Eternal Fantasy~ (1998)
- TV series, Space Symphony Maetel, 13 episodes (2004–2005)

== Cast ==
Character	Japanese actor (TV series)	Japanese actor (film)	English actor (film)	Japanese actor (live action)
Tetsuro Hoshino	Masako Nozawa	Masako Nozawa	Saffron Henderson	Ohshirô Maeda
Maetel	Masako Ikeda	Masako Ikeda	Kathleen Barr	Chiaki Kuriyama
Conductor	Kaneta Kimotsuki	Kaneta Kimotsuki	Terry Klassen	
Engine Computer	Kōji Totani (ep. 8, 50~113); Keaton Yamada (ep. 14~45)	Hidekatsu Shibata	Don Brown	
Captain Harlock	Makio Inoue	Makio Inoue	Scott McNeil	
Emeraldas	Ikuko Tani	Reiko Tajima	Nicole Oliver	Kaname Ouki
Claire	Chiyoko Kawashima	Yōko Asagami	Janyse Jaud	
Antares	Masao Imanishi	Yasuo Hisamatsu	Don Brown	Takashi Ukaji
Count Mecha	Hidekatsu Shibata	Hidekatsu Shibata	Paul Dobson	Toshiyuki Someya
(Le)Ryuzu	Haruko Kitahama (Ryuzu); Kumiko Kaori (Leryuzu)	Noriko Ohara	Willow Johnson	
Queen Promethium	Ryōko Kinomiya	Ryōko Kinomiya	Kathleen Barr	
Dr. Ban	Mizuho Suzuki	Gorō Naya	Gerard Plunkett	
Kanae Hoshino	Akiko Tsuboi	Akiko Tsuboi	Kathleen Barr	
Shadow	Mieko Nobusawa	Toshiko Fujita	Jane Perry	
Tochiro Ōyama	N/A	Kei Tomiyama	John Payne	Jun Hashimoto
Narrator	Hitoshi Takagi	Tatsuya Jo	Don Brown	

== Video games ==
Freedom Fighter and its ports were not released in Japan, the arcade original being an exclusive title at Malibu Grand Prix locations in the US. The Nintendo DS and PlayStation games were not released outside Japan.

Title	System	Release date	Publisher
Freedom Fighter	Laserdisc arcade	1987	Millennium Game Products
Escape From Cyber City (port of Freedom Fighter)	Philips CD-I	1992	Philips Media
Return to Cyber City (Another, more complete port of Freedom Fighter released in very limited quantities requiring a RealMagic MPEG decoder to play)	Windows	1995	Fathom Pictures
Matsumoto Leiji 999: Story of Galaxy Express 999	PlayStation	June 28, 2001	Banpresto
Ginga Tetsudō 999 DS	Nintendo DS	October 14, 2010	Culture Brain

Game designer Fumito Ueda cited Galaxy Express 999 as an inspiration behind his video game Ico (2001), which was influenced by the manga's relationship involving a woman who is a guardian for the young hero as they adventure through the galaxy.

== Appearances in media ==
- The anime was referenced in the song "Express 999" by South Korean female group Girls' Generation from their fourth Korean studio album I Got a Boy.
- Galaxy Express 999 was mentioned in late Korean idol Sulli's song "On the Moon".
- Virtua Fighter 3 contains a nod to the show as an Easter egg hidden in one of the game's secret stages where upon completing a specific move, a subway train will fly in the background.
- Honkai: Star Rail has a lot of direct similarities with Galaxy Express 999, including the concept of a train that travels through space to different planets.
- A stock footage of the 999 appeared in the 1980 kaiju film Gamera: Super Monster along with a stock footage of Space Battleship Yamato, where both Galaxy Express 999 (1979) and Gamera: Super Monster involved Masaya Tokuyama in productions.
