= Captain Harlock (manga) =

Japanese manga series and its adaptations

- First tankōbon volume cover, featuring Captain Harlock

宇宙海賊キャプテンハーロック (Uchū Kaizoku Kyaputen Hārokku)
- Genre: Space opera
- Manga
- Written by: Leiji Matsumoto
- Published by: Akita Shoten
- English publisher: NA: Seven Seas Entertainment
- Magazine: Play Comic
- Original run: January 13, 1977 – June 14, 1979
- Volumes: 5
- Anime television series
- Directed by: Rintaro
- Written by: Haruya Yamazaki (1–30); Shozo Uehara (31–42)
- Music by: Seiji Yokoyama
- Studio: Toei Animation
- Licensed by: NA: Discotek Media
- Original network: TV Asahi
- English network: SEA: Animax Asia
- Original run: March 14, 1978 – February 13, 1979
- Episodes: 42
- Anime film

Mystery of the Arcadia
- Directed by: Rintaro
- Written by: Shozo Uehara
- Music by: Seiji Yokoyama
- Studio: Toei Animation
- Released: July 22, 1978
- Runtime: 35 minutes
- Original video animation

DNA Sights 999.9
- Directed by: Masayuki Kojima
- Written by: Tatsuhiko Urahata
- Music by: Katsuo Ono
- Studio: Madhouse
- Released: December 18, 1998
- Runtime: 50 minutes
- Sequels, prequels and remakes
- Gun Frontier (1972 manga that features 'Sea Pirate Captain Harlock'); Gun Frontier (2002 TV series, adaptation); Arcadia of My Youth (1982 film, retelling); Endless Orbit SSX (1982 TV series, sequel); Captain Harlock and the Queen of a Thousand Years (1985 TV series, American adaptation); Harlock Saga (1999 OVA series, retelling); The Endless Odyssey (2002 OVA series, retelling); Harlock: Space Pirate (2013 film, retelling); Captain Harlock: Dimensional Voyage (2014 manga, retelling)

Space Pirate Captain Harlock (Japanese: 宇宙海賊キャプテンハーロック, Hepburn: Uchū Kaizoku Kyaputen Hārokku; also romanized as Space Pirate Captain Herlock), also titled Captain Harlock, is a Japanese manga series written and illustrated by Leiji Matsumoto. It was serialized in Akita Shoten's Play Comic from January 1977 to June 1979, with the chapters collected into five tankōbon volumes. The series follows the titular Captain, an outcast who has turned into a space pirate to rebel against Earth's government and humanity's general apathy.

Space Pirate Captain Harlock was adapted into an anime television series in 1978 directed by Rintaro and produced by Toei Animation. An animated film adaptation of the same name was released in 2013.

In August 2014, to celebrate the 60th anniversary of his debut, Matsumoto launched a retelling manga, Captain Harlock: Dimensional Voyage, illustrated by Kōichi Shimahoshi, which features some significant plot differences.

Seven Seas Entertainment has licensed the manga in North America. A sequel comic book written and drawn by Jérôme Alquié, in collaboration with Matsumoto, and published by Ablaze Comics began publication in 2021.

== Synopsis ==
In the year 2977 AD, humanity has achieved a vast starfaring civilization, but is succumbing to ennui, often due to defeat and subjugation by a foreign invader. Rising against the general apathy, Harlock denies defeat and leads an outlaw crew aboard his starship Arcadia to undertake daring raids against Earth's oppressors. Their primary oppressors are the Mazone, a race of organic plant-based alien women who explored Earth in the mythic past and are now back to reclaim it.

== Characters ==
=== The Captain ===
Harlock is the archetypal romantic hero, a space pirate with an individualist philosophy of life. He is as noble as he is taciturn, rebellious, stoically fighting against totalitarian regimes, whether they be earthborn or alien.

=== Crew of the Arcadia ===
Tadashi Daiba (台羽 正, Daiba Tadashi) (Terrence "Terry" Drake, in English), voiced by Akira Kamiya in Japanese, Ryan O'Flannigan in English.

Daiba is the audience surrogate, the viewer's gateway to Harlock's world. The 14-year-old son of a scientist who was killed by the Mazone, he joined the Arcadia crew following the death of his father. He lost his mother in a disaster on the Neptunian moon Triton when her pleas for help were ignored by the indifferent government. Tadashi is sometimes in conflict with Harlock early in the series, but he would become a trusted part of Harlock's senior staff as the series progressed.

Kei Yuki (有紀 蛍, Yūki Kei) (Kayla "Kay" Kerry in English), voiced by Chiyoko Kawashima in Japanese, Edie Mirman in English.

A young human woman with blonde hair who was already part of Harlock's crew at the time Tadashi came aboard. She first met Harlock when he raided a ship that was transporting her back to Earth as a prisoner after she had assaulted a military officer who had belittled her father's death. There is a slight intimation that she harbors a crush on Harlock (though this would be made more definite in the later SSX series), and initially seems inclined romantically towards Tadashi Daiba, though the two eventually settle into a platonic friendship. She is the Arcadia's chief navigator and science officer and the second-youngest crew member after Tadashi.

Miime (ミーメ) (La Mime or Melody in English), voiced by Noriko Ohara in Japanese, Aline Leslie in English.

A mysterious brooding female alien with blue skin and body-length blue hair. Like all of her race, Miime has no mouth or other facial features outside of almond-shaped yellow eyes. Unique to the rest of the crew, she uses alcohol as a non-intoxicating foodstuff, although drinking large amounts can induce intoxication if it is of an extremely high-proof. She possesses both psychic and psionic powers, and uses them as a means of reducing pain of injuries. Originally from the planet Jura, she became the last of her species after being saved by Harlock and crew. In gratitude, Miime became part of the crew of the Arcadia and pledged her life to Harlock's support and safety, becoming the pirate's nearest companion. Having no mouth, she can still "speak" and still absorb liquids through the general mouth area. Although not provided an official position aboard the Arcadia, she will help Doctor Zero tend to injured crew members in times of crisis. Her empathic nature makes her a valuable counselor (for example, when she consoles Miss Masu following the loss of the latter's estranged fiancé) and is capable of quelling pain/anxiety of all on board by the strumming of her lap harp. In the 1999 Harlock Saga OVA, she is refashioned to appear as a more humanoid woman and provided a different back story, making her a member of the Nibelung clan; here, her preferred musical instrument is the pipe organ and somehow possesses the ability to control time. In 2002's Endless Odyssey OVA her original look and history return. Miime is depicted as more distinctly alien but with a face featuring a mouth in the 2013 feature film.

Yattaran (ヤッタラン) (Caliban in English), voiced by Hiroshi Ōtake in Japanese, Frank Catalano in English.

Harlock's first mate on the Arcadia, he is usually portrayed as comic relief in the series, but when a battle against alien threats become imminent he will be at the captain's side. He is also a brilliant mathematician and has a major interest in building plastic model kits of ships (he was even seen building a scale model of the Arcadia in one episode). Yattaran is based on manga artist Kaoru Shintani (best known for Area 88) who, in his early career worked for Matsumoto building models for reference.

Doctor Zero (ドクターゼロ), voiced by Jōji Yanami in Japanese, Ted Layman in English.

Doctor Zero is a Chief Medical Officer. Like Yattaran, he serves as comic relief when he argues with the ship's cook, Miss Masu, over his raids of Masu's kitchen to get his beverage of choice, sake. He has a pet cat called Mi-kun (named Miaou in the French version), which he adopted after the then-kitten's mother, which was injured and apparently dying, brought him to Zero's office, and was later brought with Zero on board the Arcadia. Doctor Zero's cat, Mi-kun also appears in Space Battleship Yamato as Doctor Sado's cat. Mi-kun also makes on-off appearances in several other anime such as Queen Millennia and Galaxy Express 999. Mi-kun is based on Matsumoto's own pet cat, the latest of which is named Mi-kun III.

Maji (魔地), voiced by Kenichi Ogata.

Chief Engineer.

Miss Masu (ますさん, Masu-san), voiced by Noriko Tsukase.

Chief steward, Masu Tsunajima is a cantankerous spinster who is intolerant of her kitchen being raided by Doctor Zero or his cat. She is also a comic relief character in the series, although her back story had her intended to marry her fiancé, Gozo Otowara, before circumstances prevented the wedding from taking place. Masu believed she had been stood up, until she learned the truth years later and reconciled with Gozo in a brief communication before Gozo was killed by the Mazone.

Tochirō Ōyama (大山トチロー, Ooyama Tochirou) (Roger Devlin in English), voiced by Keaton Yamada.

Harlock's old friend and chief builder of the Arcadia. He died of illness prior to the events of the series, but his consciousness survives within the ship's computer.

=== Supporting characters ===
Emeralda is Tochiro's lover and Mayu's mother. She decides to use a spaceship to follow Tochiro's coffin into space after his death. She is an early version of Emeraldas who would play a greater role in Leiji Matsumoto's later works.

Mayu Ōyama (大山まゆ, Ooyama Mayu) (Maia Devlin in English), voiced by Chiyoko Kawashima in Japanese, Reba West in English. Is the 7-year-old daughter of Tochiro Oyama and "Queen Emeraldas" (referred to in this series as "Emeralda"). Harlock takes her under his wing following Tochiro's death and Emeraldas' departure, but she is unable to remain with Harlock due to Tochiro's wish that she remain on Earth.

Professor Tsuyoshi Daiba (Professor Drake in English), voiced by Yonehiko Kitagawa.

Tadashi Daiba's father, an astronomer and scientist. He was one of the few scientists who saw the aliens' threat and attempted to warn Earth's government before he was killed by the Mazone. Tadashi, affected by his father's murder, joined the Arcadia crew to seek his revenge.

Mitsuru Kiruda (切田 満, Kiruda Mitsuru) (Alexander Kamerov in English), voiced by Hidekatsu Shibata in Japanese, Mike Reynolds (credited as Ray Michaels) in English.

The leader of Earth's defense forces, he is Harlock's sworn enemy and will stop at nothing to try to eliminate him. Earlier in his life, Kiruda suffered the loss of his father, a government secret agent, during an ill-fated mission, followed by his mother and his younger sister Tami. Blaming the government for his family's death, he rose through the military ranks in order to effect change for the better and, like Professor Daiba before him, tried in vain to warn the Earth government of the Mazone invasion. Kiruda eventually puts his grudge with Harlock aside and sacrifices himself defending the Arcadia's main computer against Mazone troopers. Throughout the series, he is constantly concerned with the welfare of Mayu, even going as far as to take a Scorpion sting for her.

=== The Mazone ===
The Mazone, the major villains of the original 1978 series, are a race of intelligent plant-based beings in female humanoid form, with a few taking male form. As the race is asexual, their apparent gender is superficial rather than functional. When a Mazone dies, its corpse spontaneously burns up until nothing is left but ashes.

Queen Rafflesia (女王ラフレシア, Jo'ō Rafureshia) (Regina in English), voiced by Haruko Kitahama in Japanese, Barbara Goodson in English.

The reigning monarch of the Mazone, she is determined to lead her people to make Earth their new home following the destruction of their home planet. As cruel as she is beautiful, Rafflesia was once a wise and kind ruler, but the situation of her people leads her to change for the worse as the series progresses. She initially did not see Harlock as a major threat and even saved his life early on, but would later come to regret it. Faced with a plot to kidnap Mayu Oyama as a means to draw out Harlock, Rafflesia resists at first, considering such a tactic as unethical at best, but she later gives in when faced with the threat of the Arcadia to the Mazone, which later causes discord among the alien invaders. During a final showdown against Harlock, it is eventually discovered that Rafflesia is not Mazone, but human. After defeating her in their duel, Harlock allows Rafflesia to leave Earth with her people and settle elsewhere. Her name is taken from the Rafflesia, a genus of parasitic plant sometimes also referred to as a "Corpse Flower".

Commander Cleo (司令クレオ, Shirei Kureo), voiced by Akiko Tsuboi.

The commanding officer of the Mazone Royal Armada and Queen Rafflesia's chief confidant, she would come up with the plot to have Mayu kidnapped to get Harlock's attention and draw him into battle with the Mazone ruler. Cleo is later killed by Tadashi Daiba.

Commander Cassandra is a ruthless commander of the Mazone Royal Armada's Third Quadrant, and is willing to use dishonorable tactics to attempt to win battles, including using the Mazone civilian fleet as shields against attacks by the Arcadia, a tactic devised following the destruction of a civilian ship she tried to protect, which Harlock erroneously believed was a Mazone command vessel. She is killed when Harlock lures the main force of her fleet away with his mobile repair dock, leaving Cassandra's ship open to undefended attack.

Shizuka Namino (波野 静香, Namino Shizuka), voiced by Nana Yamaguchi.

A Mazone spy posing as the Earth Prime Minister's secretary, she attempts to assassinate the Prime Minister and set Kiruta up to take the blame for the deed, then springs Kiruta from prison and attempts to seek sanctuary on the Arcadia, with the intent of sabotaging the ship from the inside. Harlock discovers Shizuka's origins and subsequently grants her asylum on his ship after Queen Rafflesia deserts her and later orders her killed. Unable to return to the Mazone caravan, Shizuka, showing admiration for Harlock's noble actions in taking her aboard, forces him to kill her rather than face certain death at the Mazones' hands. Harlock later tells Kiruta, who had feelings for Shizuka, that she had died a hero battling the Mazone, never revealing to him that she was a Mazone herself. Shizuka would later return in the 2002 Endless Odyssey OVA series as the holographic assistant of Professor Daiba (aside from having dark hair in that series instead of the red hair she had in the Space Pirate series, she looked the same in both shows, but she is intended to be different characters in the two series).

== TV series adaptation ==
=== Production ===
Directed by Rintaro, the series features a dramatic narrative and a symphonic score performed by the Tokyo Philharmonic. While superficially a space opera, the series raises a several serious issues, from the challenges in the life of men to the limits of violence as an effective solution to problems. For example, Harlock is sympathetic to the plight of the Mazone, a refugee people fleeing a dying planet, and he finds no pleasure in his battles with them.

=== Distribution ===
In 1978, a faithful English-subtitled version of the original series appeared uncut on the Honolulu-based Japanese-language UHF station, KIKU. The following year, KIKU-TV distributed the series to other Japanese-language programmers on the Mainland, with KEMO-TV in San Francisco leading the way on Sunday nights at 8:00. Other cities where the series was broadcast included Los Angeles and New York.

An English dubbed version of a handful of the 1978 Captain Harlock TV episodes saw limited release in the U.S. (1981), mostly on cable and produced by ZIV International and given a VHS release by Family Home Entertainment. In all, four episodes of the series were dubbed, with the initial two episodes produced (episodes 1 and 9) appearing faithful to the original story. Several names were changed, such as the Mazones becoming Zetons and Yattaran becoming Youngblood. Notably, the dub's voice cast were not those of ZIV's typical talent pool. This, alongside sudden cuts in the video and an English-language LP record, has led to speculation that the dubs of Episodes 1 and 9 were an international dub produced by Toei and produced in Tokyo in an attempt to sell the series to English-speaking audiences. Two further episodes (2 & 3) were given a far less serious dub by ZIV, and one of the most highly joked elements in this adaptation was the change of Tadashi Daiba's name to Tommy Hairball. These episodes were subsequently acquired and redistributed in the early 1990s by Malibu Graphics, who advertised the episodes as "never-before-seen", and "completely unedited" when in reality the videos were badly mastered, with music drowning out dialogue and the audio and video falling out of sync on numerous occasions.

The 1978 series was dubbed again in 1985, this time by Harmony Gold USA (of Robotech) and known as Captain Harlock and the Queen of a Thousand Years. Using the same style as Robotech to meet TV syndication's 65+ episode requirement, the Harlock series was connected with another Matsumoto series, Queen Millennia, to tell an intertwining story (Harmony Gold had originally planned to combine the original series with the 1982 Harlock series, Endless Road SSX, but they had to change their plans upon learning of the cost of obtaining the American rights to the second show).

Unlike Robotech, episodes were made by inter-cutting whole scenes from each of the component series in each episode, with the Queen Millennia story never reaching its original conclusion. This method of reediting was very confusing, difficult to follow, and plot points would often change from one episode to the next with no apparent explanation. Despite the title, the two title characters never appear onscreen together. This version never saw wide release in North America.

Toei only recently released the show in 2008 as a pay-to-watch-service on IGN's Direct2Drive, but then in 2009, it decided to provide it for free on Crunchyroll to those who are willing to wait a certain number of days, and as part of a subscription to those who want it immediately. Funimation as well as Crunchyroll and Hulu have all the episodes with subtitles streaming on each sites respective Video Portal.

In 2009, William Winckler Productions produced two all-new English-dubbed film versions edited from the original series, each running 105 minutes. Producer William Winckler, known for the English version of Tekkaman the Space Knight, wrote, produced and directed these English-dubbed compilations, which are available in Japan only on the Toei Anime BB Premium broadband service.

Discotek Media released the complete series on DVD in one subtitled boxset for North America on August 27, 2013.

=== Episodes ===
1. "The Jolly Roger of Space"
2. "A Message From the Unknown"
3. "A Lady Who Burns Like Paper"
4. "Under the Flag of Freedom"
5. "To the Shores of Distant Stars"
6. "The Phantom Mazone"
7. "The Pyramid on the Sea Floor"
8. "The Queen's Space Fleet"
9. "The Fearsome Plant Lifeform"
10. "Approaching the Mystery Planet"
11. "When Lola Shines Golden"
12. "Mother, Be Eternal"
13. "Witch Castle in the Sea of Death"
14. "The Sphinx's Gravestone"
15. "Unrequited Love! The North Pole Aurora"
16. "Kei: A Song of Farewell"
17. "The Skeletal Hero"
18. "The Evil Shadow Soldiers"
19. "Queen Rafflesia's Trap"
20. "The Dead Planet Jura"
21. "Gohrum! The Tragic Soldier"
22. "Space Graveyard Deathshadow"
23. "Yattaran: Song of the Model Lover"
24. "The Shooting Star of Virgin Love"
25. "Doctor Zero and Mi"
26. "The Long Journey From Afar"
27. "The Will of the Arcadia"
28. "The Ulysses Nebula"
29. "Life-and-Death Struggle on the Rainbow Planet"
30. "My Friend, My Youth"
31. "The Arcadia's Secret History"
32. "Call of the Star Flute"
33. "The Lone Man's Charge"
34. "Ye Galactic Lullaby"
35. "The Beautiful Mystery Woman"
36. "The Eve of the Showdown"
37. "Tears on a Red Sweater"
38. "Farewell, Mayu"
39. "Courage: The Death of the Commander"
40. "And Then the Angels Sang"
41. "Duel! The Queen Versus Harlock"
42. "Farewell, Cosmic Corsair"
