= Ryūsaku =

- Gender: Male

Origin
- Origin: Japanese
- Meaning: Different meanings depending on the kanji used

Ryūsaku, Ryusaku or Ryuusaku (written: 柳作 or 竜策) is a masculine Japanese given name. Notable people with the name include:

- Ryūsaku Chiziwa (千々和 竜策; born 1969), Japanese voice actor
- Ryūsaku Tsunoda (角田 柳作; 1877–1964), Japanese academic
- Ryusaku Yanagimoto (柳本 柳作; 1894–1942), Japanese admiral
