= Uzura =

Uzura may refer to:

- "Uzura: 13 Japanese Birds Pt. 5", a song by Masami Akita
- Uzura, a Hayabusa-class torpedo boat
- Uzura-gakure, a Ninja technique
- Uzura, a character in the anime Princess Tutu
