= List of The Galaxy Railways characters =

The Galaxy Railways (銀河鉄道物語, Ginga Tetsudō Monogatari) is a 26-episode science fiction anime series about flying trains in space. The anime is licensed by Funimation Production Ltd. and produced by Leiji Matsumoto. It debuted on American TV in a syndicated FUNimation Channel programming block airing on CoLours TV on Monday, June 19, 2006, but was replaced by Dragon Ball until the programming block was dropped. Currently, the series is still airing on the linear FUNimation Channel. Two sequels have been produced, both currently unlicensed in English regions.

== Space Defense Force (SDF) ==
=== Sirius Platoon ===
Sirius Platoon, named after the star, is the main Platoon in the series. The Platoon's engine is Big One, which is based on the Union Pacific Railroad's 4-8-8-4 Big Boy locomotives, the largest steam locomotives ever built, but with many differences, like a second headlight in place of the bell and number boards, a single smokestack instead of a double one, a number board on the front of its smokebox instead of a handlebar, a second set of pipes coming out of the top cylinder heads of the rear set of cylinders, and the number "001" on its tender.

The Flame Swallow, Big One, and the Hiryu are equipped with Cosmo Matrix Cannon post-invasion of Alfort Armada and used only once to escape the dimensional rift at the end of the Season 2.

==== Manabu Yuuki ====
Voiced by: Naoki Yanagi (Japanese); Chris Patton (English)

Manabu is the main character in the series. The character's exact age isn't mentioned, but in the second episode it is suggested that he is 18 or 19. He is the son of Wataru and Kanna. His older brother, Mamoru, is known for being headstrong and deliberately disobeying orders. As punishment, the character often cleans trains or has other punishments inflicted upon them, but the character's antics often are part of the successful end result.

He is presented as deeply caring about the welfare of others and has stated that helping people is the reason, he is a member of the SDF. When Manabu is first heading to SDF headquarters to join the force, he meets Louise. At first the two of them bump heads, but eventually become friends. Throughout season one there is an undertone of romance between the two, and by the end of the first season they start dating officially.

Following Bruce's death, Manabu inherit his position as weapons control.

==== Louise Fort Drake ====
Voiced by: Asami Sanada (Japanese); Luci Christian (English)

Louise, like Manabu, is very headstrong, though she is generally more obedient to orders, even when she feels they are wrong. In the beginning of the season, it is revealed that she is 18 years old. Louise is a hard worker and teases Manabu frequently. Louise is the only human woman in the Sirius Platoon.

In Season 1, Episode 14 "Bond", it is revealed that Louise's father is President Drake of the Clarious Stellar Cluster. She had a rough time growing up with him because he tended to be cold and unloving towards her and she disagreed with the way that he sat back and never really ruled with his heart. By the end of the episode, she saves his life and he realizes just how wrong he had been all along.

==== Schwanhelt Bulge ====
Voiced by: Akio Ōtsuka (Japanese); John Gremillion (English)

The captain of the Sirius Platoon, Schwanhelt was made captain by Wataru in the first episode when Wataru sacrificed his life to protect everyone from the invading destroyer. Schwanhelt is a capable leader and is often (both literally and figuratively) seen as a father figure to the other members of the platoon. He puts the safety and welfare of others before his own and takes his job seriously. Schwanhelt is a caring leader, and even gave up love to protect those he cared about. He is about 41 years old.

In Episode 22, "The Merciless Wind", Schwanhelt deliberately disobeys the orders of the general from the secret intelligence division and saves crew members instead of repairing Big One and when the situation gets of out control, he ends up punching the general and knocking him unconscious. In the next episode, Schwanhelt is stripped of his title as captain of the platoon and the platoon is dissolved, causing the members to be distributed to other platoons.

In Episode 24, "Blazing Galaxy", the commander of the Galaxy Railways gives Bulge permission to take action and he is unofficially reinstated as captain.

Following the next season, Bulge was officially reinstated as captain after he led the Sirius Platoon to rescue Louise and destroying Alfort Armada's Flagship.

==== Bruce J. Speed ====
Voiced by: Takehito Koyasu (Japanese); Mike McFarland (English)

In the beginning of the season, Bruce bullies Manabu and expresses a great deal of dislike towards him. Bruce is a very commanding individual, taking charge when necessary and occasionally steps out of line, but he always steps down when Captain Bulge stops him.

Through his service to the SDF, Bruce got himself the name of "Toxic Bruce" because all his partners ended up dying in the line of duty. After the death of his second partner and Bruce got the nickname, he became a cold individual and tried his hardest to avoid getting missions with partners. Soon after this, he got a new partner, Owen, despite his argument against it. Owen was determined to get rid of the nickname "Toxic Bruce". He insisted that he was immortal, so there was no way he could die. Bruce and Owen became good friends, but on a particular mission Owen was killed beside Bruce. Because of this, Bruce blames himself for his death and deaths of all his partners and is haunted by their memory. He is often distant and cold to the members of the platoon, particularly Manabu because of his likeness to Owen, which is revealed in "Memory Gallery". After this episode, the relationship between Bruce and Manabu improves a lot, though there is still distance between them.

In Episode 18, "Life and Death", Bruce finally confronts his fear when there is a terrorist loose in the Galaxy Railways Headquarters. Bruce witnesses Manabu almost die at his side, and insists that he stay behind to protect him. Manabu, wanting to prove to Bruce that he isn't toxic, keeps following him. Manabu is at the brink of death again and Bruce saves him, breaking the curse.

In Episode 22, "The Merciless Wind", Bruce is shot by an unknown attacker and dies alone outside a gas station, though it could be safely assumed that the attacker was one of the men he crossed earlier that were harassing a nurse. His funeral is held in the next episode, and it causes a great deal of sorrow for the whole platoon, especially Manabu. Manabu, being his partner, keeps Bruce's harmonica.

He was originally going to be back in Season 2 and be friends with David Young. In Season 2, however, he was replaced by Killian Black due to his death in Season 1.

==== David Young ====
Voiced by: Hikaru Midorikawa (Japanese); Steve Harris (English)

David is a fun-loving guy, and gambles whenever possible. He makes bets in just about every situation, even those involving life and death. He is good friends with Bruce, and seems to be one of the few people Bruce connects with and trusts earlier in the season.

==== Yuki Sexaroid ====
Voiced by: Naoko Suzuki (Japanese); Amber Cotton (English)

Yuki is the medical officer aboard Big One, and is actually a type of robot called a Sexaroid. In the beginning of Season One she firmly believes her role is to be the medical officer and that because she isn't human, she can't love or be involved in anything that doesn't have to do with duty.

As the season progresses, however, she realizes that human is not a state of matter, but a state of mind and she loosens up and enjoys life more. It is said by her that she secretly loves Manabu.

==== Killian Black ====
Voiced by: Akira Ishida (Japanese); David Kaufman (English)

He is an intern, and the foster son of Mr. Conductor from Galaxy Express 999.

==== Charlie ====
Voiced by: Akira Ishida (Japanese); Greg Ayres (English)

One of the two Eagle Fighter pilots introduced during Season 2, his Eagle was shot down during the defense of Planet Fatom in Season 2.

==== Doris ====
Voiced by: Naoko Suzuki (Japanese); Grey Griffin (English)

One of the two Eagle Fighter pilots introduced during Season 2.

==== Wataru Yuuki ====
Voiced by: Kazuhiko Inoue (Japanese); Troy Baker (English)

Wataru is the first Captain of Big One mentioned in the series. He is husband to Kanna and the father of Manabu and Mamoru. In the first episode he sacrifices himself to save his crew and the galaxy from a destroyer coming through a warp hole - breaking the hearts of his wife and his children but leaving a legacy of self-sacrifice and duty.

On Season 2, it's revealed that Wataru survived his action toward the Alfort ship, but later killed in action during raid on the rogue AI facility, with his body was absorbed and used as an avatar for the AI on the later half of the Season 2. Manabu later decide to finish him own father off to shut down the rogue AI for good. The only remaining thing that was left intact was the captain's hat, which Manabu takes it home as a keepsake.

==== Owen ====
Voiced by: Akira Ishida (Japanese); Michael Rosenbaum (English)

Owen was one of Bruce's earlier partners. Much like Manabu he was headstrong and stubborn, but even more so. He died in the line of duty at Bruce's side.

==== Frell ====
Voiced by: Hyo-sei (Japanese); Hynden Walch (English)

Frell is a girl from an alternate universe. She was on an interstellar cruise with a group of friends when the ship was destroyed during an electromagnetic storm. Her escape pod then slipped through an inter-dimensional fault line and was transported to the Galaxy Railways universe. Her pod was then found by Sirius Platoon. She is about 10 years old.

She has remarkable cooking ability and was installed as Temporary Head Chef of Sirius Platoon during the latter half of Season 2.

=== Spica Platoon ===
The all female Platoon, it is named after the blue giant Spica star, which holds the title of being the brightest star in the Virgo constellation. It is another main Platoon in the series. Their engine is Flame Swallow. Unlike Sirius and Vega Platoons, their engine is not based on any real life locomotives.

Their engine was destroyed and the members survived except for Julia, who is badly injured. The engine was destroyed, but was rebuilt in Season 2. The Flame Swallow, Big One, and the Hiryu are equipped with Cosmo Matrix Cannon post-invasion of Alfort Armada and used only once to escape the dimensional rift at the end of the Season 2.

==== Julia F. Reinhart ====
Voiced by: Hyo-sei (Japanese); Stephanie Young (English)

The Captain of Spica Platoon. After graduating, she signed up for the SDF and was assigned to the Acrux Platoon. She was promoted to the Captain of Spica Platoon for her "analytical ability and high intelligence". She is bright, but also stubborn and inflexible, although she is very caring and has a high sense of responsibility. Her crew members trust her and see her as more of an older sister than a superior. She is about 35 years old at least.

Work-wise, she doesn't get along well with Murase, the Captain of Vega Platoon, because of her stubbornness to relinquish command and his tendency to act before he thinks. She was badly injured during the battle.

==== Percy Shelly ====
Voiced by: Hikari Yono (Japanese); Colleen Clinkenbeard (English)

The Pilot of Flame Swallow, she is an expert with vehicles, able to control everything from the smallest switching engine to the largest Combat Train with ease. After graduating from training, she took a course with an SDF piloting expert and was assigned to Spica Platoon. Her ability to fly Flame Swallow has been called "extremely stable".

She is an excellent mechanic, and owns several classic cars that she likes to drive around and tune in her private time. She is intelligent, but somewhat impatient.

==== Maggie Redford ====
Voiced by: Yūki Mitsugi (Japanese); Jamie Marchi (English)

The weapons specialist of Spica Platoon, she is a very skilled fighter pilot and graduated from the SDF Air Force Academy with the title of "Novice Rank S" before being assigned to Spica Platoon.

She has a rough side and sometimes just wants to settle things by force. She also is a very gifted cook.

==== Ai Matsuura ====
Voiced by: Tomato Akai (Japanese); Caitlin Glass (English)

The Radar and Communications Officer of Spica Platoon, her parents were professional communications engineers. After graduating from training school, she was assigned to Spica Platoon due to her high processing capability and accuracy. She can sometimes become obsessed with processing.

She has a jolly personality and is the jokester of Spica Platoon. She is naturally bright and attentive, which Captain Julia likes. She also has a sweet tooth, which has become a bit famous with the SDF Purchasing Department, due to her many shipments of gourmet candies.

In episode 19 she also displayed and stated that she was interested in a relationship with Manabu Yuuki, but this was never mentioned again.

=== Vega Platoon ===
Vega Platoon consists solely of men. It is named after the Vega star, which is the brightest star in the Lyra constellation and the fifth-brightest star at night. One of the main platoons of Season 1, their engine is the Iron Berger, which is loosely based on the Pennsylvania Railroad S1 6-4-4-6 steam locomotive designed by Raymond Loewy, but has an 0-8-8-4 wheel arrangement.

The engine was destroyed, and the members were killed at the end of Season 1, during the Alfort Armada's invasion of the Galaxy Railways, after they brought the Gustav Cannons to Big One's aid. The platoon's name was then retired due to their sacrifice.

==== Ryūsaku Murase ====
Voiced by: Ryūsaku Chiziwa (Japanese); William Katt (English)

The Captain of Vega Platoon. After graduating from SDF training, he was assigned to the Acrux Platoon. He was rewarded with the Captainship of Vega Platoon after he killed the leader of a notorious band of Space Pirates.

He rushes headlong into battle without thinking much of it, and is not afraid to bang up the Iron Berger in the process. He is known for coming away with a loss the first time in a battle, but will take down any opponent in a rematch.

Due to his morality issues, few people will work together with him, since most people don't share his convictions. He has a cat named Shirabota and loves eating curry, and sometimes in the series, shows interest in Captain Julia of Spica Platoon, finally saying that he loves her just before Iron Berger was destroyed in episode 25.

He died as a result of Iron Berger's destruction during the final battle with the Alfort Armada.

==== Edwin Silver ====
Voiced by: Wataru Hatano (Japanese); David Naughton (English)

The Weapons Officer of Vega Platoon and a former mercenary, he is well known as one of the best gunmen in the SDF. He is particularly good with rapid-fire, one-on-one fighting and is skilled at hand-to-hand combat as well. Although he was invited to join the Space Panzer Grenadiers, he declined and became Murase's first officer.

He can seem coarse at first, but has a gentle, caring side and sees Schneider as a brother. In his spare time, they can be seen picking fights downtown, but Schneider brilliantly seems to be able to keep it under wraps. He seems to cherish the closeness that his platoon has with the Sirius Platoon, but also sees it as a rivalry.

He was killed as a result of injuries sustained when the Gustav Cannons exploded during the final battle with the Alfort Armada.

==== José Antonio Valdivia ====
Voiced by: Atsushi Imaruoka (Japanese); Robert Stack (English)

The Pilot of the Iron Berger, he joined the SDF after being part of the Revolutionary Armed Forces on Planet Azaras. His movements on the battlefield are likened to a snake or a gust of wind, that is how refined of a warrior he is.

He is a self-proclaimed layabout and often tells Murase that he is too lazy to follow orders. He loves being in Vega Platoon, as he sees his future as obscure. He is a skilled gunner, but loves to drink and sit in hot tubs.

He was killed due to blunt head trauma during the final battle with the Alfort Armada.

==== Moritz Schneider ====
Voiced by: Yōji Ueda (Japanese); Anthony Bowling (English)

The Radar and Communications Officer of Vega Platoon, he was assigned to the platoon after graduating from SDF training. He is a great all-around soldier, technology-savvy and able to pilot most craft well. He has different ideas on tactics, thankfully not different enough that Murase sees them as silly.

He has an indomitable and chivalrous spirit, and always tries to put on his best face in front of women.

He was killed when the Gustav Cannons exploded during the final battle with the Alfort Armada.

=== Cepheus Platoon ===
Cepheus Platoon is named in honor of the Cepheus Constellation. This platoon was not shown in the original television series but was later introduced in the second. The Cepheus Platoon was a replacement for Vega Platoon in the second series, as all of the Vega Platoon members were killed during the final battle against the fleet of Alford Armada.

The Flame Swallow, Big One, and the Hiryu are equipped with Cosmo Matrix Cannon post-invasion of Alfort Armada and used only once to escape the dimensional rift at the end of the Season 2.

==== Guy Lawrence ====
Voiced by: Yasushi Miyabayashi (Japanese); Nathan Fillion (English)

He replaced Captain Murase after Murase's death in Episode 25. He once works under Sirius Platoon when Wataru Yuuki is alive as captain, and saw Manabu as spitting image of the late captain.

==== Jean Pierre ====
Voiced by: Masato Nishino (Japanese); Roger Clark (English)

He replaced Silver after Silver's death in Episode 25.

==== Kim R. Nightguy ====
Voiced by: Yōji Ueda (Japanese); Jason Marsden (English)

He replaced Jose after Jose's death in Episode 25

==== Kori Raysheed ====
Voiced by: Hikari Yono (Japanese); Cree Summer (English)

She replaced Schneider after Schneider's death in Episode 25.

=== Mizar platoon ===
The name "Mizar" is reference of the Mizar star in the constellation of Ursa Major.

The Mizar Platoon has only been introduced through the Galaxy Railways Drama CD.

==== Tian Deng ====
Voiced by: Koji Tsujitani (Japanese); Peter Renaday (English)

The recent new leader of the brigade and appears to have an intense fear of earthquakes. He is in his mid 30s.

==== Riina Schmidt ====
Voiced by: Tomato Akai (Japanese); Hayley Atwell (English)

The assistant Platoon leader, she is the oldest of the three sisters and is an expert in firearms. She is in her mid 30s as well.

==== Alice Schmidt ====
Voiced by: Kanako Sakai (Japanese); Lauren Tom (English)

The second oldest of the three sisters and is in her mid 20s, she is in charge of communication on board.

==== Laura Schmidt ====
Voiced by: Mariya Ise (Japanese); Jennifer Hale (English)

The youngest of the three sisters at 20 years of age, she is in charge of radar in the platoon.

==== "Cotton Candy" ====
Voiced by: Daisuke Namikawa (Japanese); Robert Patrick (English)

Nicknamed as such due to his hair, he likes doing housework and loves bird watching. On board, he is in charge of operations and is constantly harassed by the three sisters to do their bidding. He is also in his mid 20s.

== Space Panzer Grenadiers (SPG) ==
=== Frederick Johannson ===
Voiced by: Kenyū Horiuchi (Japanese); Xander Berkeley (English)

The Captain of Space Panzer Grenadiers, he is the senior officer of Murase, the Captain of Vega Platoon.

In Episode 20, "Choice", he throws a bucket of water on Manabu and tell the other trainees to pack up and leave. He then told stories about Mamoru's death by Guy Sander, the leader of the space pirates in Episode 2.

In Episode 24, "Blazing Galaxy", he was killed as a result of 666's destruction during the invasion of the Alfort Armada.

=== Mamoru Yuuki ===
Voiced by: Hikaru Midorikawa (Japanese); Dave Trosko (English)

Mamoru Yuuki is the older brother of Manabu Yuuki and the son of Wataru and Kanna Yuuki. He followed in his father's footsteps and joined the SDF four years after his father died protecting the Galaxy. Mamoru died one year later in a SPG battle.

=== Bartolomeu Helguera ===
Voiced by: Kenyu Horiuchi (Japanese); Jerry Zumwalt, Jim Cummings (English)

=== Ariavenus ===
Voiced by: Romi Park (Japanese); Kath Soucie (English)

Ariavenus was a member of the SPG at the same time as Mamoru. It is safe to assume that they were in love, as she makes an appearance during the first episode of Season 2 and leaves flowers on Mamoru's grave.

She helps Sirus Platoon several times over the course of the season, including allowing Sirius Platoon to recover Frell's life pod, and giving Killian the information he needed to discover the abandoned Shield Cutter project.

Afterwards, her car was chased by a Secret Intelligence helicopter and run off a cliff before catching fire and exploding. It is unknown whether she survived the attack or not.

== Galaxy Railways Administration Bureau ==
=== Layla Destiny Shura ===
Voiced by: Yōko Asagami (Japanese); Laura Bailey (English)

She is the Supreme Commander of both SDF and SPG.

=== Heigorō Tōdō ===
Voiced by: Hitoshi Kubota (Japanese series 1), Yasushi Miyabayashi (Japanese series 2), Jeff Glenn Bennett (English)

He is the commander of both SDF and SPG.

=== Brad ===
Voiced by: Kayato Ōhashi (Japanese); Kent Williams (English)

=== Franz ===
Voiced by: Yōichi Masukawa (Japanese); Mark Rolston (English)

=== Kate ===
Voiced by: Asuka Tanii (Japanese); Lucy Small (English)

=== Miki ===
Voiced by: Izumi Koike (Japanese); Emily Hornsby, Trina Nishimura (English)

=== Sayaka ===
Voiced by: Aki Nanbu (Japanese); Kate Borneman (English)

=== Sōichirō Nagumo ===
Voiced by: Kayato Ōhashi (Japanese); Mike T. Weiss (English)

== Maintenance Bureau ==
=== Isamu Whitman ===
Voiced by: Takeshi Aono (Japanese); Brice Armstrong (English)

He died due to electric shock while he and Manabu were rescuing the Pegasus Express.

=== Tarō Akatsuki ===
Voiced by: Mitsuaki Hoshino (Japanese); R. Bruce Elliott (English)

=== Bill Baxter ===
Voiced by: Mitsuaki Hoshino (Japanese); Roger Smith (English)

== Special Intelligence Bureau ==
=== Ivonov Leonidovitch Berichkov ===
Voiced by: Kōzō Shioya (Japanese); Grant James, Peter Woodward (English)

Ivonov was a general who was a part of the Space Defense Force. In Episode 23 he was knocked out cold by Schwanhelt Bulge, but he would be responsible for making Annex move forward to attack the Alfort Destroyers, causing Annex's destruction.

=== Hiroshi Kondō ===
Voiced by: Takeshi Aono (Japanese); Steven Blum (English)

== Other characters ==
=== Kanna Yuuki ===
Voiced by: Yōko Asagami (Japanese); Jenny Seman (English)

She is the mother of Mamoru and Manabu Yuuki and is married to Wataru Yuuki. She runs a shop on Manabu's home planet, Tabito. She is about 44 years old.

=== Kinuko Asai ===
Voiced by: Hikari Yono (Japanese); Linda Young (English)

Kinuko is the nice old woman that Manabu meets in episode 3, "Wheel of Fate". Her son had been in an SDF accident and died. She caters to the SDF because her son loved the SDF.

=== Narrator ===
Voiced by: Hitoshi Kubota (Japanese); Corey Weinman (English)

=== Shaw ===
Voiced by: Bin Shimada (Japanese); Thomas Wilson (English)

Shaw is one of the important characters in episode 6 and 7. He dislikes the SDF and the Galaxy Railways, and was willing to blow up the trains just to get the opportunity to destroy the SDF Headquarters. He was introduced when Manabu was suspended from duty to take time off to decide whether he chose the right path in joining the SDF. In episode 7 Shaw was arrested for killing innocent people by blowing up the trains. He hates the SDF and the Galaxy Railways and trash-talks about them to Manabu during his suspension. The reason for this is because when he was younger his mother was sick. He boarded a train to Plant Velder. A robot that worked on that train kicked Shaw off the train because he did not have a ticket to be on that train. When the train started to move, Shaw ran after it and ended up in the tracks. The train ran over Shaw's body and the SDF had to replace his body with robotic parts. His mother died because he wasn't able to save her. He worked as a vendor in the SDF Headquarters.

=== Leon ===
Voiced by: Bin Shimada (Japanese); Jim Foronda (English)

=== Maya ===
Voiced by: Hikari Yono (Japanese); Tricia Helfer (English)

She is a partner and a girlfriend to Bruce. The reason for this is because her arm was hurt during the World War II battle.

=== Kevin ===
Voiced by: Naoki Yanagi (Japanese); David Trosko (English)

=== Tina ===
Voiced by: Yōko Asagami (Japanese); Monica Rial (English)

Tina is one of the important characters in episode 22. She is a kind nurse and likes to help Bruce whenever he was injured. She was captured by some men. Bruce shoots the car's tire and her hat was blown off by the wind.
