= Naoki Yanagi =

Japanese voice actor

- 矢薙 直樹
- Born: Tomoki Yanagi (柳 知樹); November 1, 1972 (age 53); Tokyo, Japan
- Other name: Tomoki Yanagi
- Occupation: Voice actor
- Years active: 1990–present
- Agent: Artist Crew
- Website: freemarch.jp

Naoki Yanagi (矢薙 直樹, Yanagi Naoki; born Tomoki Yanagi (柳 知樹 Yanagi Tomoki), November 1, 1972) is a Japanese voice actor who was born in Tokyo. He was associated with Trias Production, and is now with Artist Crew. He has voiced in a number of anime shows and video games. Some of his lead roles include Manabu Yuuki in The Galaxy Railways, Mythos in Princess Tutu, Renji Hiiragi in Night Wizard!, Cacao in Trouble Chocolate, Moses in Blood+ and Gyro Robo in Machine Robo Rescue. He heads a production company called FreeMarch.

== Filmography ==
=== Anime ===
List of voice performances in anime
Year	Title	Role	Notes	Source
1999	Great Teacher Onizuka	Tadaaki Kusano		
1999	Trouble Chocolate	Cacao		
2001	Gyōten Ningen Batseelor	Minimanda ミニマンダー		
2002	Azumanga Daioh	Boy student		
2002	Princess Tutu	Mytho		
2003	Machine Robo Rescue	Gyro Robo, Bonn, Umeda ジャイロロボ / ボン / 梅田		
2003	Ashita no Nadja	John Whittard		
2003	The Galaxy Railways	Manabu Yuuki		
2004	Burn-Up Scramble	19		
2005	Fushigiboshi no Futagohime	Nagiyo		
2005	Basilisk	Yashamaru		
2005	Onegai My Melody	Hiroaki Yamamoto		
2005	Blood+	Moses		
2006	Fushigiboshi no Futagohime Gyu!	Edward / Edochan		
2006	Innocent Venus	Gora		
2006	The Galaxy Railways: Crossroads to Eternity	Manabu Yuuki		
2006	The Galaxy Railways: A Letter from the Abandoned Planet	Manabu Yuuki		
2007	Night Wizard The ANIMATION	Hiiragi Renji		
2008	Yu-Gi-Oh! 5D's	Hunter Pace		
2004	Tsukuyomi: Moon Phase	Oyakata		

=== Video games ===
List of voice performances in video games
Year	Title	Role	Notes	Source
2001	Sakura Taisen 3 ~Pari wa Moeteiru ka~	Crowd	DC	
2002	Breath of Fire: Dragon Quarter	Tantra タントラ	PS1 / PS2	
2004	Castle Shikigami 2	Shintaro Kuga	PS1 / PS2	
2004	Dolly knight (ドーリィナイト)	Junna · A ジュンナ・A	PC Adult; Name in Atsui Ishiki. hero	
2005	Hitotsu ya Monogatari (ひとつや物語)	Teo テオ	PC	
2005	Yakuza	Akimoto	PS2	
2006	Sono Mirror (ja:合わせ鏡の神子)	Feather restraint rain 羽戒時雨	Other	
2006	Kimi Star ~Kimi to Study (きみスタ～きみとスタディ～)	Suga Natsuno 須賀夏野	PS1 / PS2	
2006	Blood+ Double Wing Battle Round Dance	Moses	PS1 / PS2	
2006	Kamiaku Kiseki (神薙ぐ御剣)	Ad = water guard アド=水守	Other	
2006	Yakuza 2	Akimoto	PS2	
2008	Night Wizard The VIDEO GAME ~ Denial of the World ~	Hiire Rina 柊蓮司	PS1 / PS2	
2008	Ryū ga Gotoku Kenzan!	Akimoto Kojiro	PS3	
2008	Mana Khemia 2: Fall of Alchemy	Yun	PS2	
2009	Yakuza 3	Akimoto	PS3	
2014	Ryu Ga Gotoku Ishin!	Akimoto Bunkichi	PS3/PS4	
2016	Yakuza kiwami	Akimoto	PS3/PS4/PC	
2017	Yakuza kiwami 2	Akimoto	PS4/PC	

== Dubbing ==
- Mikoto Yutaka in The Day of Revolution
- Cubit Foxtar Mega Man Zero 3
- Edd (Double D) in Ed, Edd n Eddy (Japanese dub)
- Baby Sylvester in Baby Looney Tunes (Japanese dub)
- Uwasa no Futari (Hiroshi Akabane)

=== Drama CDs ===
List of voice performances in drama CDs
Year	Title	Role	Notes	Source
2003	Tensho Yao's fall (ja:天正やおよろず)	Aldo アルド		
2009	Drama CD Galaxy Railway Story ~ Farthest Angel Angela ~	Manabu Yuuki		
	Night Wizard!		Talk CDs	
