= Trouble Chocolate =

Japanese anime television series

- The front cover of the first VHS.

トラブルチョコレート (Toraburu Chokorēto)
- Genre: Fantasy, Romantic Comedy
- Anime television series
- Directed by: Tsuneo Tominaga
- Produced by: Hikaru Kondo; Masakazu Kumabe; Masatoshi Kotaka; Shunsuke Harada; Taro Iwamoto
- Written by: Tsunefumi Harada
- Music by: Moka; Hiromi Kikuta; Takayuki Nagasawa; Avex
- Studio: AIC; ROBOT; Hakusensha; Step Visual Corporation
- Licensed by: NA: Viz Media (2002-present)
- Original network: TV Asahi
- Original run: October 8, 1999 – March 24, 2000
- Episodes: 20
- Manga

Trouble Chocolate: The Comic
- Illustrated by: Morito Kakei
- Magazine: Etsu
- Original run: March 30, 2000 – ?
- Volumes: 1

Trouble Chocolate (トラブルチョコレート, Toraburu Chokorēto) is a romantic comedy fantasy anime produced by AIC in 1999 and is licensed in the United States by Viz Media. The series features Cacao, a student at Micro-Grand Academy studying magic. One day, while his magic class teacher, Ghana, is performing a spell to summon a tree spirit, Cacao finds and eats some chocolate, which turns out to be 200-year-old magical chocolate. After eating the chocolate he becomes drunk and causes a wreck. During this, he interferes with Ghana's spell, letting the spirit, Hinano, escape. She inhabits the body of a marionette, who then moves in with Cacao.

A second season of 24 episodes was planned but was eventually cancelled.

Subsequent episodes of Trouble Chocolate have little connected storyline. Rather, the show is a parody of other anime. For example, two other characters, Murakata and Deborah, are constantly shown professing their love to each other, set to absurdly explosive special effects and backdrops, as is common (to a lesser extent) in many anime.

The dubbed dialogue in Trouble Chocolate (written by professional comedy writer Pamela Ribon and recorded by The Ocean Group) often bears little or no resemblance to the original script (as heard in Japanese and seen in the subtitles), as opposed to the normal convention of translating the words as directly as the change in lip-sync will allow.

== Plot ==
"Cacao woke up to find a girl sleeping next to him. Unable to remember what had happened on his own and didn't get enough needed answers from Hinano, he went to school to ask his friends what had happened. He finally got the explanation of events from Prof. Ghana in term Cacao joined his wizardry class."

== Characters ==
Cacao (カカオ, Kakao)
Voiced by: Naoki Yanagi (Japanese); Richard Ian Cox (English)
The main male character of the series. He often gets drunk off of eating chocolate. Cacao is rather lazy as a whole and is often always hungry.
Hinano (ヒナノ, Hinano)
Voiced by: Sakura Tange (Japanese); Nicole Oliver (English)
The main female character of the series. She often says "It's Enough" (じゅうぶんです, Jūbun Desu) and "Wahoo" (わっちゃ, Watcha). She is a faerie spirit who inhabits a marionette and will do anything she can to protect Cacao and make him happy.
Murakata (ムラカタ, Murakata)
Voiced by: Hiromichi Kogami (Japanese); Ted Cole (English)
Handsome star athlete and Mr. Popular all around. He is adored by his kohai Deborah and is often sen together. He is captain of the school security force, SMAT and has an ulter-ego as The Masked Driver.
Deborah (デボラ, Debora)
Voiced by: Kyoko Hikami (Japanese); Venus Terzo (English)
Hinano's rival and lover of Murakata. She is pretty and popular and is often jealous of the attention Hinano receives from the other students. Deborah is second in command of SMAT.
Truffle (トリュフ, Toryufu)
Voiced by: Yasuyuki Kase (Japanese); Michael Adamthwaite (English)
Super rich heir of the city's chocolate conglomerate. He is madly in love with Hinano and will go to great lengths to win her affection.
Almond (アーモンド, Āmondo)
Voiced by: Ikue Otani (Japanese); Saffron Henderson (English)
A tribal boy who was accidentally transported to the city when Cacao interfered with a magic spell. Almond once ate enough food to feed 100'000 people in a matter of a few hours. He resembles a tornado similar to the Tasmanian Devil when he hunts for food.
Ghana (ガーナ, Gāna) / Ganache
Voiced by: Tomohiro Tsuboi (Japanese); Michael Dobson (English)
A magic teacher at MG Academy. He constantly attempts to teach Cacao magic, with little to no success.
Big Bang (ビッグバーン, Biggu Bān)
Voiced by: Hidenari Ugaki (Japanese); Brian Dobson (English)
A teacher at MG Academy. She is shown to have feelings for Papaya.
Papaya (パパイヤ, Papaiya)
Voiced by: Shigeru Nakahara (Japanese); Ron Halder (English)
A teacher at MG Academy. He dislikes Sunlight.
Matcha (抹茶, Matcha) / Green Tea
Voiced by: Yuko Sasamoto (Japanese); Saffron Henderson (English)
A Chinese mercenary who hunts chocolate monster cards. Her younger twin sister is Azuki.
Azuki (小豆, Azuki) / Red Bean
Voiced by: Hiromi Tsunakake (Japanese); Kelly Sheridan (English)
A Chinese mercenary who hunts chocolate monster cards. Her older twin sister is Matcha.
Hamu Hamu (ハムハム, Hamu Hamu) / Ham Ham
Voiced by: Yuji Ueda (Japanese); Michael Dobson (English)
The alien shop owner of Dagashi-ya and Cacao's landlord.
Wheat (コムギ, Komugi)
Voiced by: Yumiko Watanabe (Japanese); Jocelyne Loewen (English)
An elementary school newspaper reporter and member of SMAT.
Sardine (イワシ, Iwashi)
Voiced by: Takako Honda (Japanese); Andrew Francis (English)
A small nerdish male member of SMAT and Cacao's best friend.
Mint (ミント, Minto)
Voiced by: Yui Horie (Japanese); Janyse Jaud (English)
A girl who has desires to conquer the world. She however is mostly a joke when it comes to evil. She has a sidekick named Crunchy Bug (Spider Monster in Japanese). Crunchy Bug is voiced by Yuji Ueda in Japanese and Colin Murdock in the dub.
Mozzarella (モッツァレラ, Mottsu~arera)
Voiced by: Masaaki Tsukada (Japanese); Richard Newman (English)
Truffle's grandfather and Ganache's arch-nemesis. He is also the main antagonist of the series.

== Theme Songs ==
- Openings
  - "C.H.O.C.O."
  - Lyricist: Akio Togashi / Composer: Akio Togashi / Arranger: Akio Togashi / Singers: Sakura Tange&Kyoko Hikami
- Endings
1. "Hey Why..." (ねぇ 何で…, Nē Nande…)
  - October 8, 1999 - January 14, 2000, March 24, 2000
  - Lyricist: Atsushi Iwamizu / Composer: Hitoshi Harukawa, Shifo / Arranger: Hitoshi Harukawa / Singers: Rie Yoshizawa
  - Episodes: 1–12, 20
2. "I Want to See You: Missing You - Millenium Dance version" (あなたに逢いたくて〜Missing You〜 Millenium Dance Version, Anata ni Aitakute: Missing You - Millennium Dance version)
  - January 21, 2000 - March 17, 2000
  - Lyricist: Seiko Matsuda / Composer: Seiko Matsuda, Ryo Ogura / Arranger: Ando Takahiro / Singers: Sakura Tange&Kyoko Hikami
  - Episodes: 13–19

== Episode list ==
No.	Title	Original release date
1	"First Trouble" / "In Comes Trouble" "Fāsuto Toraburu" (ファーストトラブル)	October 8, 1999
Cacao awakens then becomes shocked to see a girl sleeping in his bed. She introduces to him as Hinano but luckily for him it turns out she's a puppet. Watch as how things happened in Cacao's life and how Hinano was with him all the time. "You're Welcome"
2	"Science Special Investigation Club Depart!" / "Meet the S.M.A.T." "Kagaku Tokusō Butai Bu Shutsudō!" (科学特捜部隊部出動！)	October 15, 1999
Hinano decides to see Cacao in the Micro Grand Academy although she failed to notice that she's been followed by a purple slime monster. Soon, the monster causes mayhem in the school but Cacao managed to lure it out from the school and got defeated by Hinano's power. "You're Welcome"
3	"Mega-Rich Transfer Student" "Tenkōsei wa Mega-Ritchi" (転校生はメガリッチ)	October 29, 1999
Determined to win Hinano's heart, Truffle decides to enroll in the Micro Grand Academy much to Cacao's dismay turning it into a war zone but Cacao managed to destroy Truffle's army after he inadvertently ate a chocolate from a nearby student(forgetting Prof. Ghana's advice that he become drunk after eating the chocolate similar to Episode 1) and the latter was defeated. "You're Welcome"
4	"MG Academy Hungry Panic" / "Hunger Panic" "Emu Jī Gakuen Hangurī Panikku" (MG学園ハングリーパニック)	November 5, 1999
When all the food in town are taken by a strange tornado, the students began to suspect Cacao(because of his loud rumbling tummy) who ate all the food. It turns out that the strange tornado was actually a wild boy named Almond causing all the trouble. "You're Welcome"
5	"The Strongest and Invincible Love Love Couple" / "The Greatest Love of All" "Saikyō Mutekina Rabu Rabu Kappuru" (最強無敵なラブラブカップル)	November 12, 1999
The guys in MG Academy became infatuated by Hinano making her popular much to Deborah's jealousy and Cacao's double dismay because Almond(the wild boy from Ep4) also tag along. Deborah tries many times to ruin Hinano's reputation but most attempts she tries have failed. Deborah challenges Hinano to a softball tournament although the latter is clueless about this and when she understands Deborah and Murakata's meaning of their love, Hinano drags Cacao, Ghana, and Almond to form her team. But soon their game is interrupted when Truffle appears and a pumpkin monster causes mayhem in the field, but the latter got defeated by Deborah and Hinano's love for their man while the former will stop at nothing to get Hinano's heart. "You're Welcome"
6	"Would You Like Matcha and Azuki?" / "Kitty-Kat Kalamity" "Matcha to Azuki wa Ikagaka na?" (抹茶と小豆はいかがかな？)	November 19, 1999
Green Tea and Red Bean were sent on a mission by their master to find monster cards to fulfill their mission and their wishes as comedians. Cacao then becomes shocked that the store is full of cats and finds that Hinano was the one who bring them here including the tiger(that Truffle brought it). Just then, a monster card releases a giant fortune cat monster then causes trouble but its body is broken by Green Tea and Red Bean's terrible jokes. Problem is, the monster spirit inside the giant fortune cat then goes to possess Cacao and controls the kittens(that Hinano collected) to scare the civilians but got drawn out by Green Tea and Red Bean's Power Boobies. And after that, Green Tea, Red, Bean, and their master decides to move in with Cacao as room mates. "You're Welcome"
7	"The 34th School Contest" / "Athletic Supporters" "Dai Sanjūyon-kai Gakuen Kontesuto" (第34回学園コンテスト)	December 3, 1999
The Micro Grand Academy is holding an athletic contest where the winner will get a gift certificate of free food. Everyone is excited for this while some of them have their wins on their own things. "You're Welcome"
8	"The Target is the Magic User" / "...And Called it Macaroni" "Tāgetto wa Mahō Tsukai" (ターゲットは魔法使い)	December 10, 1999
Truffle's grandpa develop an assassin named Macaroni to eliminate all sorcery in Micro Grand Academy, but Problem is, Macaroni easily gets lost and taken down by unexpected things. But Truffle has his own plan, he wants to prevent Macaroni from harming Hinano. When Macaroni is about to finish off Cacao(mistaken for a sorcerer), Big Bang appears and reveals that both of them were best friends and happily enjoy their reunion. "You're Welcome"
9	"Horrible - Bathtub Doll Incident" / "Bathing Beauties" "Kyōfu - Yubune Ningyō jiken" (恐怖 湯舟人形事件)	December 17, 1999
The class feels uneasy with Papaya's teachings due to him hating the sunlight and freaking out when looking at blood. When a rumor about girls disappearing and transformed into a wooden doll in the bathtub is heard, Cacao and the other students will have to investigate this matter and also clearing Hinano's name because the student council thinks that she's connected to this(due to Hinano being a wooden puppet). "You're Welcome"
10	"Run, Express Messenger-kun!" / "Wait, Mister Postmen" "Hashire, Hikyaku-kun!" (走れ、飛脚くん！)	December 24, 1999
Sardine decides to see his e-mail friend Guppy whom he falls in love with. When Sardine notices a girl named Iwana he falls in love and follows her thinking that she might be Guppy. Just then, a small monster named Courier appears and Sardine accepts his offer to deliver Sardine's love letter. Later, everyone in school is also interested in Courier and things get out of control when they want to use him to deliver their love letters although they failed to notice that Courier can split into many clones of himself whenever he gets nervous. But things get worse when all the courier clones transform into a giant courier who becomes enraged when he is just being used for more things than sending love letters but he reverted to small size by Hinano's tears. But for Sardine, the latter becomes heartbroken when Iwana wants a "whale" for a boy. "You're Welcome" and "Can Do"
11	"Magical Digging War" / "Love at First Sight" "Majikaru Horehore Taisen" (マジカルホレホレ大戦)	January 7, 2000
Prof. Ghana becomes disappointed with Cacao's behavior so he tries a spell to make him feel better but Cacao messes it up and becomes affected by a love spell which causes anyone he looks in the eye to fall in love with him but luckily Hinano is immune. "You're Welcome"
12	"Conquest Girl Mint" / "It Was Mint to be" "Seifuku Shōjo Minto" (征服少女ミント)	January 14, 2000
A girl named Mint tries to conquer Micro Grand Academy with her sidekick Crunchy Bug but only ends up in unexpected situations. "You're Welcome"
13	"Deborah VS Mecha-Deborah" "Debora VS Meka-Debora" (デボラVSメカデボラ)	January 21, 2000
When Mint and Crunchy Bug are watching a film of Deborah, Mint invented Mecha-Deborah to try to conquer Micro Grand Academy and then causes trouble in the campus. Soon it turns into a misunderstanding for the real Deborah since all the students think that the real one is causing the mayhem and Hinano suggests that both Deborah and the Mecha will have a contest to see who really loves Murakata. Just then, Mint appears and switch Mecha Deborah to full size to try and destroy the academy while carrying Deborah and Hinano. When Ghana and Cacao tries a "destruction spell" on the mecha, it unexpectedly makes the real Deborah grow big but their combat between the mecha and real Deborah is cut short when Hinano presses the switch behind Mecha Deborah making it normal size. But at least the latter enjoys being with the flat Murakata despite she's still big. "You're Welcome"
14	"Encounter With Nushi" / "The Monster of Lake Micro-Grand" "Nushi Tono Sōgū" (ヌシとの遭遇)	February 4, 2000
At night time, Cacao and the gang saw Wheat(in a school swimsuit) saying that she saw a lake monster at night. Wheat tells them how she saw the monster and revealed that she was the only one who escaped while the other S.M.A.T team are sucked in by it. But for Cacao, Almond, Green Tea and Red Bean, they're only interested in the treasure so they go in deep water in Truffle's submarine. Meanwhile, Mint and Crunchy Bug are underwater in a steel cube trying to get rid of the gang but failed twice and the monster is revealed to be a giant squid and the whole gang is sucked in by the water hole. It is revealed that the whole gang were inside an alien spaceship where all the marine animals become experimental substances in morphing with humans including some of Cacao's friends. "You're Welcome"
15	"The Mysterious Pencil-kun" / "The Incredible Mister Pencil" "Fushigi na Penshiru-kun" (不思議なペンシルくん)	February 11, 2000
Because of Almond's destruction and childish attitude, Cacao, his friends, and even Hinano are turning against him leaving him a little depressed until he's greeted by Mr. Pencil. Mr. Pencil tells Almond that anything it draws becomes magical(except for food) and Almond tries it except he drew terribly. Unfortunately, Almond goes too far with Mr. Pencil when his drawings causes too much trouble for Cacao, Hinano, and the other MG students. When Mint saw Mr. Pencil, they trick Almond into thinking that Crunchy Bug has hiccups where she managed to kidnap Mr. Pencil from Almond. Later, Mr. Pencil tells Almond to draw a big bird and after they managed to, Mr. Pencil says goodbye to Almond saying that he's out of lead. "You're Welcome"
16	"Explosion! Bomb Granny of Love" / "Granny's Surprise" "Bakuretsu! Ai no Bomu Bā-san" (爆裂！愛のボム婆さん)	February 18, 2000
When Prof. Papaya keeps on getting blown up by Love Granny's love bombs, Prof. Ghana explains that if Papaya blows up by the love bombs 5 times, he'll turn into an old man. So Cacao, Hinano and their friends(including Mint and Crunchy Bug) team up with Big Bang to prevent that from happening. "You're Welcome"
17	"Mini Mini Adventure" / "A Small Problem" "Mini Mini Adobenchā" (ミニミニアドベンチャー)	March 3, 2000
Big Bang plans on making a vegetable garden and Cacao and Almond agrees but too bad Truffle interrupted their plan. Meanwhile, Mint(J.Joker) has a package called "Hyper Grow X 2002" and tries it and managed to shrink Cacao's place and some objects except she and Crunchy Bug have also shrunk when it got reflected by a street mirror. So Cacao and his friends even Mint and Crunchy Bug go on a small adventure to try to find a solution on how to get big again and also meets an elf named Paki. The gang stays at Paki's elf village but the village chief has a disagreement with humans since they cause harm in their village but Cacao and Hinano denies this and Paki lets them stay for the night. The next day, Cacao and his friends decides to protect the elf village from being destroyed by Big Bang and the other students gardening the lawn(although they fail to noticed that Cacao and his friends have shrunk). It also reveals that Paki and Truffle we're best friends since he saved the latter from being crushed by a statue so Truffle gets even with him by controlling his jet to destroy Big Bang's bulldozer. The elf villagers and chief thanks Cacao and his friends and uses their magic to make them grow back to big size. "You're Welcome"
18	"Hinano, Burning in Club Activities!" / "One of us" "Hinano, Bukatsu ni Moeru!" (ヒナノ、部活に燃える！)	March 10, 2000
Hinano, Truffle and Almond joined the Scientific Mission Attack Team or S.M.A.T for the 1st time and Murakata welcomes them, except Deborah tells him that the new members needs to be in a test to be qualified. Meanwhile, Cacao returns home after he bought many food except he got upset when Red Tea and Green Bean stole some of his food and during his meal, a flashback is seen that Hinano wants to join a club with Cacao, but the latter denies the offer making Hinano upset and even insults her catchphrase when she left. When Truffle is unhappy with the club since they only wait for things to happen, he decides to call his ninjas to create a commotion to make the S.M.A.T team useful. After a failure play of Truffle's ninjas, a chameleon monster named "I'm Sorry" has the power to shape-shift into people when it licks them. Later, the real Cacao was attacked by S.M.A.T who mistakes him for the monster and when Hinano noticed I'm Sorry (as Cacao) behind her, she hugs him who also mistakes it for the real Cacao. The real Cacao becomes so annoyed with Ghana and Mint's argument that he ate the chocolate and goes on a drunken magic frenzy but Hinano managed to find the real Cacao while I'm Sorry just revert to a card after it waves goodbye. After Cacao wakes up, he plans on joining S.M.A.T but Hinano says that she quits already. "You're Welcome" and "I'm Sorry"
19	"Hinano, Gets Confessed to!" / "Hinano Gets a Secret" "Hinano, Kokuhaku Sareru!" (ヒナノ、告白される！)	March 17, 2000
Truffle insists that Hinano will have to accept him as a BF although the latter only loves Cacao better and accepts the former's golden cards. Then, Hinano goes to Cacao for help that Truffle was kidnapped but Cacao refused and even some of his friends(although Hinano doesn't understand the meaning of "kidnap"). Meanwhile, Truffle was called by his grandpa Mozzarella that he became disappointed that his son forgets his objective to destroy sorcery in Micro Grand Academy and sends his doctors to forget his son's love illusion. In Cacao's place, Hinano decides to rescue Truffle, along with Mint, Crunchy Bug, Green Tea, Red Bean. Later, when Cacao noticed that something is wrong, he saw that MG academy is surrounded by Mozarella's soldiers then chased by them, and then realize that the gang was trying to rescue Truffle so Cacao decides to save Hinano, his friends and Truffle while MG academy is swarmed by soldiers. "You're Welcome"
20	"You're Welcome, Hinano!" "Hinano, Jūbun Desu!" (ヒナノ、じゅうぶんです！)	March 24, 2000
The final battle has begun and Cacao is still being pursued by Mozzarella soldiers while trying to find Hinano and his friends. Luckily, some of MG academy students managed to escape from the soldiers and tells Cacao that Hinano is in Truffle's place(Mozzarella Bldg.) and Cacao goes to rescue them. Cacao managed to find Hinano but is blocked by a transparent wall, however when he saw Hinano being assaulted by a droid behind her, Cacao unleashes his rage which doubles his magic and destroys the droid successfully. Unfortunately, the Hinano, Cacao rescued was a fake and Mozzarella decides that he will have a duel with Cacao but Cacao got defeated and got thrown off onto a window but got rescued by Papaya. It was revealed that Mozzarella became a cyborg after he was killed 100 years ago and managed to overpower the teachers. When all hope is lost of Cacao, Hinano releases her soul and fused inside him and defeats Mozzarella. After the credits, Hinano was alive and everything's back to normal but the question remains: Who is Donboy? "You're Welcome makes the world go round"

== Reception ==
THEM Anime Reviews gave Trouble Chocolate two stars, saying that it's "At best, worth a rental, but only if you've seen everything else at Blockbuster".

Mania.com gave the first North American Trouble Chocolate DVD a B+ for audio, a B for video, a B+ for packaging, a C for its menu and a B for its extras.

digitallyOBSESSED! gave the first North American Trouble Chocolate DVD a B for style, a B− for substance, a B+ for image transfer, a B+ for audio transfer and a D for extras.
