= List of Princess Tutu characters =

This is a list of characters from the anime and manga series Princess Tutu.

== Main characters ==
Duck (あひる, Ahiru) / Princess Tutu (プリンセスチュチュ, Purinsesu Chuchu)
Voiced by: Nanae Katō (Japanese); Luci Christian (English)
A friendly and kindhearted duck who gains the ability to become human after Drosselmeyer gives her a magical pendant. As a human, she is around 14 years old, and like a duck, is easily excitable, clumsy, and talkative. If Duck removes the pendant or quacks while talking, she transforms back into a duck, and must touch water while wearing the pendant to return to human form. The pendant also allows Duck to transform into Princess Tutu, who is wise and graceful. According to Drosselmeyer's writing, she would turn into a speck of light and vanish if she confessed her love to Mytho. In the anime, despite her feelings for Mytho, over time she develops a close relationship with Fakir and they aid each other out of their shared desire to protect Mytho and restore his heart. While it is never confirmed if she has feelings for Fakir, she does state that he gives her strength. In the manga, where she is known as Ahiru Arima, her feelings for Mytho are left open-ended, with Rue competing for his heart.

Mytho (みゅうと, Myūto) / Siegfried (ジークフリート, Jīkufurīto)
Voiced by: Naoki Yanagi (Japanese); Jay Hickman (English)
A noble and kind prince and the protagonist of Drosselmeyer's story The Prince and the Raven, who sacrificed himself to protect the weak and needy by shattering his heart to seal away The Raven. He is around 15 years old, and despite being a popular senior at Gold Crown Academy (Kinkan Gakuen) and known as a talented ballet dancer, he possesses no emotions and is largely dependent on his roommate and childhood friend Fakir for his well-being and survival. As Tutu restores his emotions, he finds himself both afraid of and drawn to her, wanting her to return the rest of his heart and know what she thinks of him. He is later corrupted by The Raven's blood, which Kraehe put on one of his heart shards, and attempts to steal girls' hearts as sacrifices to The Raven. While his true personality attempts to fight back against the corruption, as it progresses he becomes unstable and verbally abusive to Rue. However, with her help he overcomes The Raven's blood when the last heart shard is returned; because of this, he chooses Rue to be his princess. At the end of the series, his real name is revealed to be Siegfried, which is also the name of the Prince in Swan Lake.

Fakir (ふぁきあ, Fakia)
Voiced by: Takahiro Sakurai (Japanese); Chris Patton (English)
Mytho's roommate, who is around 16 years old and, like him, is a talented ballet dancer. He is initially possessive of Mytho, displaying a need to be in control of his actions and discouraging his emotions. He also acts rude or hostile towards anyone who appears to be growing close to Mytho, including Rue, Duck, and Princess Tutu. This behavior came about out of a desire to prevent Mytho from repeating the events of the past, which he felt he could only do by preventing him from regaining his heart. However, Duck helps him realize that Mytho wants his heart back. Fakir is the reincarnation of the Knight in Drosselmeyer's story, who died to protect the Prince, and was born with a birthmark on his chest that resembles a scar and is in the same place as the wound that killed the Knight. It is later revealed that Fakir is a descendant of Drosselmeyer and inherited his ability to bend reality with his writing. When he was young, he tried to use this power to stop a raven attack, but failed and his parents were killed. This made him shut away the knowledge of this power until Duck convinces him to write again. After deciding to continue writing, he realizes that he can only successfully write stories about Duck. By the end of the series, he has fallen in love with Duck and promises to stay by her side.

Rue (るう, Rū) / Princess Kraehe (プリンセスクレール, Purinsesu Kurēru)
Voiced by: Nana Mizuki (Japanese); Jessica Boone (English)
An aloof girl who is around 15 years old and who others, particularly Duck and her pupils, admire for her skills as an advanced ballet student. She has loved Mytho since childhood after he defended her from crows, and now takes advantage of his apathy to pretend they are a couple. Like Duck, she also has a magical alter ego, Princess Kraehe, the daughter of The Raven. Her jealously interferes with Tutu's attempts to restore Mytho's heart, as she fears that he will fall in love with someone else. Her father, The Raven, uses her as a means to revive him, but she eventually learns that she is not a raven, but rather a human girl who was kidnapped as a baby during The Raven's attack on the town. When it appears Mytho will give himself to The Raven, Rue sacrifices herself to defeat him while admitting she had always loved him. Touched by her selfless act, Mytho regains his heart and rescues her, asking her to be his princess. In the manga, where she is named Rue Kuroha, she is colder and more cruel. Her name is derived from Kraehe, the German word for crow.

== Antagonists ==
The Raven (大鴉, Ōgarasu)
Voiced by: Takayuki Sugou (Japanese); Mike Kleinhenz (English)

The monster from Drosselmeyer's story The Prince and The Raven and one of the main antagonists of the anime. Mytho shattered his heart to seal The Raven away, who then ordered the sacrifice of young, beautiful hearts to eat and restore his form. He stole Rue from her parents as a child and raised her as his daughter, calling her Princess Kraehe, while being cruel and abusive towards her. He later orders her to corrupt Mytho with his blood; when Rue's love for him allows him to break free from the tainted heart shard's corruption, he rescues her and they defeat The Raven together. The Raven does not appear in the manga, but is mentioned by Edel.

Drosselmeyer (ドロッセルマイヤー, Dorosserumaiyā)
Voiced by: Noboru Mitani (Japanese); Marty Fleck (English)

An elderly man with a long, white beard, and one of the main antagonists of the anime. He was the author of The Prince and The Raven, who has grown bored of happy stories and seeks to make it a tragedy instead. He died after the townsfolk cut off his hands to stop him from warping reality with his writing, but he created a writing machine by writing in his own blood, which he uses from the clock tower to influence the story. His name is derived from the godfather of the children in Tchaikovsky's other work The Nutcracker. He does not appear in the manga.

== Supporting characters ==
Edel (エデル, Ederu)
Voiced by: Akiko Hiramatsu (Japanese); Christine Auten (English)

A life-sized wooden puppet who plays a street organ and carries a tray of jewelry. She gives advice to Duck and tells her stories. Drosselmeyer created Edel to act as narrator in his stead and originally without her own emotions, though she ends up developing them through her interactions with Duck. She sacrifices herself in a fire to save Fakir and provide a light for guiding Mytho and Princess Tutu to safety during the finale of the first season. In the manga, Edel is portrayed as the human owner of a shop where Duck sees a ballet tutu she admires. As a gift, Edel gives her a necklace with an egg-shaped jewel and makes her promise to come back again. She also seemingly takes Drosselmeyer's role in encouraging Princess Tutu and Princess Kraehe. In the second volume, she is revealed to be plotting to revive The Raven within herself.

Uzura (うずら)
Voiced by: Erino Hazuki (Japanese); Christine Auten (English)

A toddler-like doll created by Fakir and Mytho's adoptive father Charon from Edel's ashes. She plays a small drum and, like Edel, aids Duck by helping her turn into a human with a splash of water. She is curious, and throughout the series is fixated on finding out what love is. She does not appear in the manga.

Autor (あおとあ, Aotoa)
Voiced by: Yuu Urata (Japanese); Adam Conlon (English)

A snobbish music student at Gold Crown Academy who is obsessed with Drosselmeyer and his powers. After realizing that Fakir is a descendant of Drosselmeyer, he becomes interested in him and encourages him to use his powers. When Rue attempts to seduce him to feed his heart to The Raven, after Autor professes his love for her, she begins to doubt The Raven's words that only he and the Prince could love her and lets him go. He does not appear in the manga.

Pike (ぴけ)
Voiced by: Sachi Matsumoto (Japanese); Cynthia Martinez (English)

An outspoken and tomboyish girl and one of Duck's two best friends from her class, who is 14 to 15 years old. In the second season of the anime, she is the first attempted victim of Mytho after The Raven's blood possesses him, and almost loses her heart until Tutu saves her. In the manga, she is replaced by a girl named Mai.

Lilie (りりえ, Ririe)
Voiced by: Yuri Shiratori (Japanese); Sasha Paysinger (English)

A girl who is Duck's other best friend from dance class, who is 14 to 16 years old. She is constantly trying to push her into a relationship with Mytho and later Fakir and tends to romanticize star-crossed lovers. In the manga, she is replaced by a girl named Yuma.

Mr. Cat (猫先生, Neko-sensei)
Voiced by: Yasunori Matsumoto (Japanese); TJP (English)

The dance teacher at Gold Crown Academy. He is one of the few anthropomorphised characters from the anime to appear in the manga, and plays a similar role in both. He appears to be obsessed with marriage, and frequently threatens misbehaving female students with marrying him if they do not reform. In the anime, he particularly makes this threat to Duck, due to her lack of concentration during practice and her constant tardiness. Despite his quirks, he is a competent teacher and offers words of wisdom and advice to his students. At the end of the anime, he is shown as a normal cat with a female cat, who he had kittens with.

Narrator (Kyōko Kishida in Japanese and Jennie Welch and Marcy Bannor in English) is a female voice that presents a short tale in the prologue before each episode that is often related to the theme of its title. She also narrates the split-episode previews and the closing of Chapter of the Fledgling.
