= Hiromi Tsunakake =

Japanese voice actress (born 1975)

- 綱掛 裕美
- Born: November 5, 1975 (age 50); Kyoto Prefecture, Japan
- Occupation: Voice actress
- Agent: I'm Enterprise
- Website: Kokoro no Oto

Hiromi Tsunakake (綱掛裕美, Tsunakake Hiromi; born on November 5, 1975, in Kyoto) is a Japanese voice actress affiliated with I'm Enterprise.

She is best known for her voice roles as Nana in Cyborg Kuro-chan, Shūran in The Story of Saiunkoku: 2nd Series, Kimi in Papillon Rose: The New Season, Yura Sakurazuki in Futakoi Alternative, Challo in Elemental Gelade, Tsukuyomi in Negima!: Magister Negi Magi, Azuki in Trouble Chocolate, Kanae Mizuhara in Platonic Chain, and Layla in Weiß Kreuz Glühen.

== Filmography ==
=== Television animation ===
List of voice performances in television animation
Year	Title	Role(s)	Notes	Source
1999–2001	Cyborg Kuro-chan	Nana, Princess Mimi	Main role, Debuted in Ep. 16; Princess Mimi debuts in Ep. 59	
1999	Trouble Chocolate	Azuki		
2002	Platonic Chain	Kanae Mizuhara		
2003	Weiß Kreuz Glühen	Layla		
2004	Futakoi	Yura Sakurazuki		
2005	Elemental Gelade	Challo		
2005	Canvas 2: Akane-iro no Palette	Art club member	Ep. 4, 14	
2005	Futakoi Alternative	Yura Sakurazuki		
2005	Negima!: Magister Negi Magi	Tsukuyomi		
2006	Love Get Chu: The Miracle Book of Voice Actors	Video store clerk	Ep. 11	
2006	Papillon Rose: The New Season	Kimi		
2007	Good Luck! Ninomiya-kun	Irori Okushiro		
2007	The Story of Saiunkoku: 2nd Series	Shūran		
2008	Sgt. Frog	Girl	Ep. 199	
2008	Noramimi	Girl	Ep. 9	
2008	Bleach	Tenku Sacchi		
2022	Science Fell in Love, So I Tried to Prove It r=1-sinθ (Heart)	Kyoto Dialect Guide		
2024–2026	Blue Miburo	Townsperson, Soba Shop Owner's Daughter	Townsperson in Ep. 4, Soba Shop Owner's Daughter in Ep. 8	

=== Video games ===
List of voice performances in video games
Year	Title	Role(s)	Platform(s)	Source
1999	Kaitō Ranma Miyabi	Wakana Ōkouchi	Playstation	
2004	Futakoi	Yura Sakurazuki	Playstation 2	
2006	Arcana Heart	Kira Daidohji	Arcade, Playstation 2	
2008	Arcana Heart 2	Kira Daidohji	Arcade, Playstation	
2011	Arcana Heart 3	Kira Daidohji	Arcade, Playstation 3, Xbox 360, exA-Arcadia	

=== Internet radio ===
- Hiromi to Yumi no Chicchai Futari
- Take-chan・Hiromi no Seiyū Banzai!

=== Radio ===
- Takehito Koyasu no Hana Yume Kibun de LaLa PARTY (Assistant)
- Suzune no Onegai･･･Kami-sama no Iu Tōri

=== Drama CD ===
- Anime Tenchou Series (CoCo Saikōbi)
- Mika ni Harassment (Cocoa Hiyoshizaki)

=== CD ===
- Futari no Kiseki (Opening and Ending Themes of Hiromi to Yumi no Chicchai Futari)
