= Chris Patton =

American voice actor (born 1971)

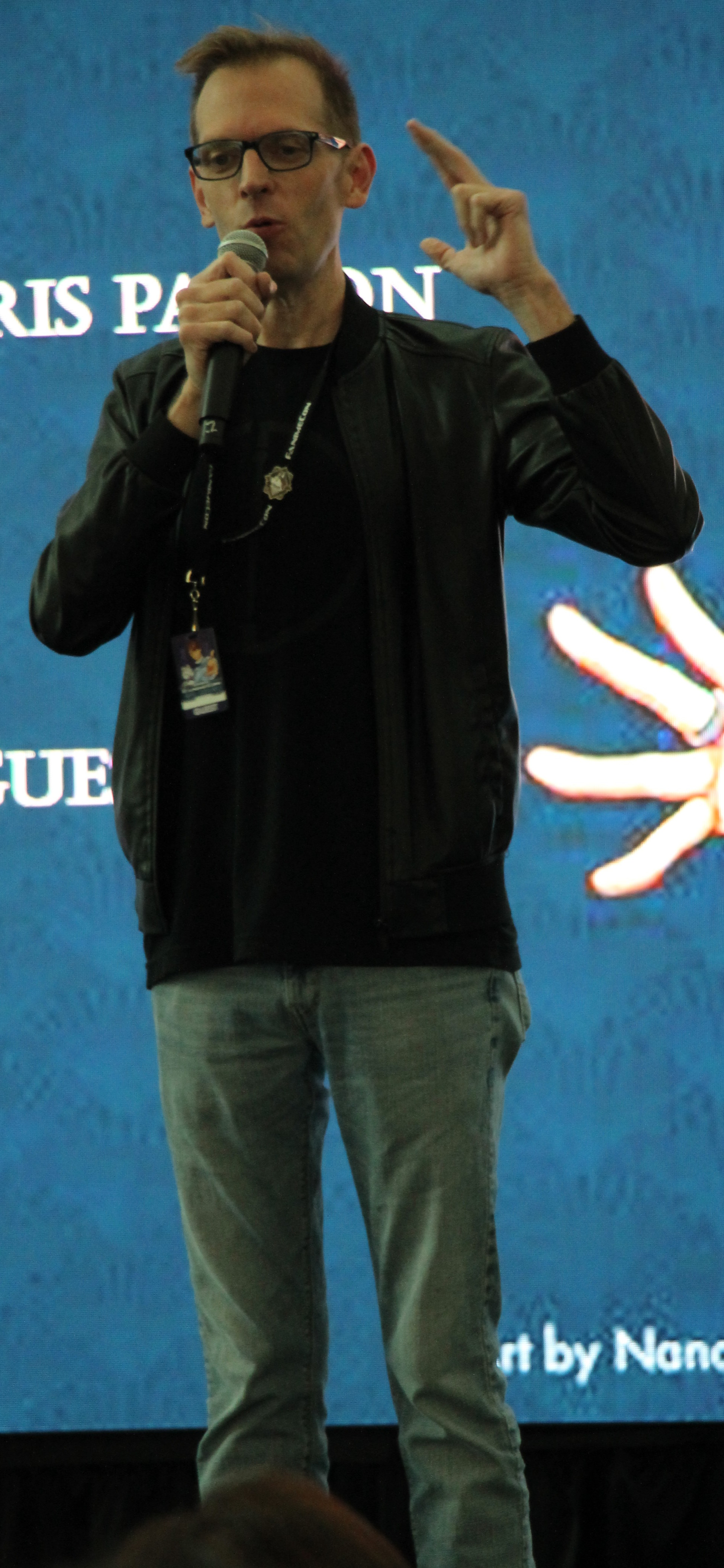
- Patton at FanimeCon 2019
- Born: March 15, 1971 (age 55); Houston, Texas, U.S.
- Occupation: Voice actor
- Years active: 1998–present

Christopher David Patton (born March 15, 1971) is an American voice actor who has worked on a number of English-language versions of Japanese anime series. Some of his major roles include Sousuke Sagara in Full Metal Panic!, Turles in Dragon Ball Z: The Tree of Might, Greed in Fullmetal Alchemist, Ayato Kamina in RahXephon, Graham Specter in Baccano!, Hajime Aoyama in Ghost Stories, Manabu Yuuki in The Galaxy Railways, Creed Diskenth in Black Cat, Ikki Minami in Air Gear, Asura in Soul Eater, Agito in Origin: Spirits of the Past, and Keima Katsuragi in The World God Only Knows.

Patton is an alumnus of the University of Houston. He has also been in over 55 live productions, and has lent his voice to commercials, audio books, video games, narration, and eLearning software projects.

== Personal life ==
Patton was born in Houston, Texas. He moved to Annapolis, Maryland, in 2013, and occasionally flew back to Houston to perform some roles for anime. He moved back to Houston in 2015 and would eventually move to Los Angeles in 2018, before returning to Texas in 2023. Patton is gay, having come out publicly during an interview in 2013.

== Filmography ==
=== Anime ===
List of English dubbing performances in anime
Year	Title	Role	Notes	Source
1998	Those Who Hunt Elves	Kerames		
1999	Original Dirty Pair	Carine	OVA	
1999	Master of Mosquiton	Henderson, others	OVA	
1999	Bubblegum Crisis: Tokyo 2040	Daley Wong		
2000	Gensomaden Saiyuki	Sanbutsushin, Turles, Koumyou		
2000	Gasaraki	Yushiro Gowa		
2000	Generator Gawl	Customer, Student		
2000	Martian Successor Nadesico	Saburota Takasugi, others		
2001	Princess Nine	Seishiro Natsume		
2002	Excel Saga	Various characters		
2002	Chance Pop Session	Various characters		
2003	All Purpose Cultural Cat Girl Nuku Nuku	Ozaki, others	Also DASH!	
2003	Noir	Chu	Also as Himself in DVD extra Noir: the Unsoled Story	
2003	Neo Ranga	Asao, Ichigi, others		
2003	Aura Battler Dunbine	Bishop, Allen Brady, others		
2003	Najica Blitz Tactics	Tod		
2003	Super GALS!	Rei Otohata		
2003	Angelic Layer	Ohjiro Mihara		
2003	Saint Seiya	Andromeda Shun	ADV dub	
2003	Prétear	Sasame		
2003	Orphen series	Flamesoul, others		
2003	Magical Shopping Arcade Abenobashi	Eutus, others		
2003	Legend of the Mystical Ninja	Ebisumaru, others		
2003–04	RahXephon	Ayato Kamina		
2003–18	Full Metal Panic! series	Sousuke Sagara		
2004	Neon Genesis Evangelion: Directors' Cut	Seele, others		
2004	Kiddy Grade	Teenage D'Autriche	Ep. 22	
2004	Kino's Journey series	The Traveler	Ep. 4 (2003 anime), Ep. 11 (2017 anime)	
2004	Puni Puni Poemy	Kuroda, Spooge, others		
2004	Azumanga Daioh	Various characters		
2004	BASToF Syndrome	Bebefau, others		
2004	Case Closed	Dexter Reynolds, Alex Carr	Ep. 55, 59-60	
2004	Gravion	Eiji Shigure		
2004	Megazone 23	Giam; Bishop Won Dai	Part 2 Part 3	
2004	Nurse Witch Komugi	Inaba, Satoro Akahori, others		
2004	Aquarian Age: Sign for Evolution	Kyouta Kamikurata		
2004	Chrono Crusade	Joshua Christopher		
2004	Peacemaker Kurogane	Susumu Yamazaki, Seiga no Chujo, others		
2004	Mezzo	Kazuto		
2004	Sister Princess	Akio Yamagami, others		
2004	D.N.Angel	Elliot		
2004	Cyber Team in Akihabara	The Black Prince / Takashi Ryūgasaki		
2004–06	Kaleido Star series	Ben, Dio, Johann, others		
2005–06	Princess Tutu	Fakir	Also special	
2005	Gantz	Joichiro Nishi		
2005	Kekko Kamen	Teacher Ben, others		
2005	Divergence Eve	2nd Lt. Hicock, Platoon Leader, others		
2005	A Tree of Palme	Shatta, Gyariko		
2005	Burst Angel	Eiji		
2005	Fullmetal Alchemist	Greed		
2005	Elfen Lied	Various characters		
2005	Kodocha	Naozumi Kamura		
2005	The Galaxy Railways	Manabu Yuuki		
2005	Samurai Gun	Mitsumune Watou		
2005	Godannar	Knight Valentine, others		
2005	Mythical Detective Loki Ragnarok	Narugami/Thor, others		
2005	Ghost Stories	Hajime Aoyama		
2005	Hakugei: Legend of the Moby Dick	Academias / Aca		
2005–06	Area 88 series	Shin Kazama	Also Burning Mirage	
2006	Macross	Maximilian Jenius	ADV dub	
2006	Diamond Daydreams	Karin's Brother		
2006	UFO Ultramaiden Valkyrie	Triam		
2006	Nanaka 6/17	Nenji Nagihara		
2006	Negima!	Fate Averruncus		
2006	Tactics	Haruka, others		
2006	Speed Grapher	Sid		
2006	This Ugly yet Beautiful World	Daijirou Matsumura		
2006	Papuwa	Guma		
2006	Shin-Chan	Dr. Enema		
2006	Jinki: Extend	Hiroshi Kawamoto		
2006	Guyver	Sho Fukamachi / Guyver		
2006	Paniponi Dash!	Tsurugi Inugami, Beep		
2006	Black Cat	Creed Diskenth		
2006	Nerima Daikon Brothers	Ichiro		
2007	Coyote Ragtime Show	Katana, others		
2007	Utawarerumono	Oboro		
2007	Solty Rei	Yuto K. Steel		
2007	Air Gear	Itsuki Minami		
2007	Beck: Mongolian Chop Squad	Manabu Miyazawa		
2007	Kurau: Phantom Memory	Black		
2007	Innocent Venus	Jō Katsuragi		
2007	Xenosaga: The Animation	Tony		
2007	Red Garden	JC		
2007	Welcome to the N.H.K.	Tatsuhiro Sato		
2007	The Wallflower	Ranmaru Morii		
2007–08	Baccano!	Graham Specter	2008 TV series	
2008	Kanon	Yuichi Aizawa	2006 TV series	
2010	Soul Eater	Asura		
2010	Fullmetal Alchemist: Brotherhood	Greed	First incarnation only	
2010	Strike Witches	Various characters		
2010	Dragon Ball Z Kai	Orlen		
2010	Tears to Tiara	Lector		
2011	Guin Saga	Astrias		
2011	Demon King Daimao	Akuto Sai		
2012–15	The World God Only Knows	Keima Katsuragi		
2013	Another	Naoya Teshigawara		
2013	Kids on the Slope	Kaoru Nishmi		
2013	Inu x Boku SS	Sōshi Miketsukami		
2013	Outbreak Company	Garius en Cordobal		
2014	Diabolik Lovers	Ayato Sakamaki		
2014	Pokémon the Series: XY	Sanpei		
2015	Akame ga Kill!	Run		
2015	Re: Hamatora	Moral		
2015	Black Bullet	Rentaro Satomi		
2015	Parasyte: -the maxim-	Haruki Tachikawa		
2016	Cross Ange	Embryo		
2016	The Disastrous Life of Saiki K.	Kusuke Saiki		
2016	Handa-kun	Asahi Ichimiya		
2017	Skip Beat!	Hiroaki Ogata		
2017	Diabolik Lovers: More, Blood	Ayato Sakamaki		
2017	GATE	Yanagida		
2017–24	Haikyu!!	Toru Oikawa		
2021	Hero Mask	James Blood	Sentai dub	
2021	Scarlet Nexus	Kagero Donne		
2022	My Dress-Up Darling	Store Employee		
2022	Sasaki and Miyano	Akira Kagiura		
2023	Farming Life in Another World	Vargryfe		
2023–24	The Dangers in My Heart	Nigorikawa		
2024	I've Somehow Gotten Stronger When I Improved My Farm-Related Skills	Loki		

==== Film ====
List of English dubbing performances in anime films
Year	Title	Role	Notes	Source
2000	Sin: The Movie	John "JC" Armack		
2000	Martian Successor Nadesico: The Motion Picture – Prince of Darkness	Saburota Takasugi		
2001	Spriggan	Yu Ominae		
2004	Lupin III: Dead or Alive	Crisis		
2004	Slayers Premium	Gourry Gabriev	ADV dub	
2005	The Place Promised in Our Early Days	Hiroki Fujisawa		
2006	Dragon Ball Z: The Tree of Might	Turles	Funimation dub	
2007	Origin: Spirits of the Past	Agito		
2010	Colorful	Mitsuru Kobayashi		
2012	Gintama: The Movie	Gintoki Sakata	Sentai dub	
2012	Towa no Quon	Technical Chief		
2012	Starship Troopers: Invasion	Kharon		
2016	Gatchaman: The Movie	Sabu		
2017	Sword Art Online The Movie: Ordinal Scale	Eiji Nochizawa		

=== Live-action ===
List of English dubbing performances in TV series and movies
Year	Title	Role	Notes	Source
2004	Conduct Zero	Rumor Mill Smooth		
2005	The Fuccons	Mamoru Kawakita, Blueberry King		

=== Video games ===
List of English dubbing performances in video games
Year	Title	Role	Notes	Source
2006	Dragon Ball Z: Budokai Tenkaichi 2	Turles		
2007	Dragon Ball Z: Budokai Tenkaichi 3	Turles		
2010	Dragon Ball: Raging Blast 2	Turles		
2016	Dragon Ball Xenoverse 2	Turles		
2017	Akiba's Beat	Asahi Tachibana		
2017	Fire Emblem Echoes: Shadows of Valentia	Kliff		
2018	WarioWare Gold	Ben		
2018	Dragon Ball Legends	Turles		
2019	Fire Emblem: Three Houses	Linhardt		
2021	Scarlet Nexus	Kagero Donne		
2021	When the Night Comes	Omen		
2022	Fire Emblem Warriors: Three Hopes	Linhardt		
