= Cyborg Kuro-chan =

Japanese children's manga

- First tankōbon volume cover

サイボーグクロちゃん (Saibōgu Kurochan)
- Genre: Action, Comedy
- Manga
- Written by: Naoki Yokouchi
- Published by: Kodansha
- Magazine: Comic BomBom
- Original run: September 1997 – December 2001
- Volumes: 11
- Manga

Cyborg Kuro-chan: Extra Battle
- Written by: Naoki Yokouchi
- Published by: Kodansha
- Magazine: Comic BomBom
- Original run: December 2002 – December 2005
- Volumes: 2
- Anime television series
- Directed by: Yoshihiro Takamoto
- Produced by: Akifumi Takayanagi (TV Aichi); Kouki Matsuura (Public & Basic)
- Written by: Yū Yamamoto
- Music by: Kei Wakakusa; Toshiyuki Arakawa
- Studio: Studio Bogey
- Original network: TXN (TVA, TV Tokyo)
- Original run: 2 October 1999 – 30 December 2000
- Episodes: 66
- Video game

Cyborg Kuro-chan: Devil Fukkatsu!!
- Publisher: Konami
- Genre: Shoot 'em up
- Platform: Game Boy Color
- Released: 23 March 2000
- Video game

Cyborg Kuro-chan 2: White Woods no Gyakushū
- Publisher: Konami
- Genre: Shoot 'em up
- Platform: Game Boy Color
- Released: 19 October 2000
- Video game

Kaettekita Cyborg Kuro-Chan
- Publisher: Konami
- Genre: Shoot 'em up
- Platform: PlayStation
- Released: 28 November 2002
- Video game

Pīlì Kùlè Māo
- Developer: Lonaisoft
- Publisher: Lonaisoft
- Genre: Shoot 'em up
- Platform: Microsoft Windows
- Released: 2002

Cyborg Kuro-chan (サイボーグクロちゃん, Saibōgu Kurochan) is a Japanese manga series written and illustrated by Naoki Yokouchi. It was serialized in Kodansha's children's manga magazine Comic BomBom from September 1997 to December 2001, with its chapters collected in 11 tankōbon volumes. The series centers on the title character, a housecat who is kidnapped and transformed into a cyborg by the mad scientist Dr. Go. Kuro-chan breaks his control chip, escapes and becomes a vigilante.

An anime television series adaptation produced by its Public & Basic aired on TV Aichi, TV Tokyo and their affiliates from 2 October 1999 to 30 December 2000 for 66 episodes. The manga and anime have been exported to several countries in Asia, Europe, and Africa. An English dub aired on Animax and the first 14 episodes of the dub were released on VCD. A large number of merchandise has been made based on the manga and anime, and two additional volumes, entitled Cyborg Kuro-chan: Extra Battle, were published. Reviews for the series note the simplistic and cartoonish art style, and a thin storyline which is mainly centered on gags and comedic violence.

== Story ==
Kuro is a housecat for an old couple who cannot defend themselves and are in frequent danger. They rely on him to keep burglars from invading their house, at which he is skilled. Despite his courage, he is in love with the neighborhood dog, Pooly, and he sets out to confess this one day. While heading to see her, he and Pooly are ambushed and injured. Kuro is then kidnapped by Dr. Go, a mad scientist, and transformed into a cyborg with invincible steel frames and unlimited strength, the latest in a line of robot cats used for world domination, called the "Nyan-Nyan Army". He somehow, though, breaks a chip supposedly used to control him, and he escapes Go's laboratory as well as destroying it, while he now realizes that he is now bipedal and can speak human language. He comes to terms with his predicament, while maintaining his lifestyle as an average housecat. However, Go feels that Kuro is ungrateful to him, and he and the Nyan-Nyan Army, including the most well-known Mi, set out to find and kill him, though they eventually surrender and decide to live a more peaceful life.

Often, Kuro will save his owners and the city from trouble. He has multiple adversaries, including Go's Nyan-Nyan Army. Dr. Go and Mi help Kuro out in the toughest situations. Throughout the course of the series, there are phantasmal and extraordinary predicaments that Kuro and his friends must solve.

== Characters ==
Promotional image of the characters of the series. Slapstick humor is combined with action, while accompanied by Yokouchi's distinctive style of drawing.

=== Main ===
Kuro
- First appearance: September 1997
- Created by: Naoki Yokouchi
- Voiced by: Chika Sakamoto

In-universe information
- Species: Cyborg cat
- Gender: Male

Kuro (クロちゃん, Kuro-chan) - The main character who was kidnapped by Dr. Go and turned into a cyborg cat, along with various features and weapons. Though he has a horrible temper, appears unenthusiastic about helping others, and gets angry and out of control easily, he is good-hearted and cares for others more than he lets on. Despite being the hero, he frequently shows un-heroic behavior such as using Romeo as a weapon or at times dragging others into trouble because he feels like it and likes to rampage for comedic effect. He uses a Gatling gun as a signature weapon. He is usually seen sleeping on the veranda of his owner's house. He was named Kid (キッド) as a kitten before being adopted by his owners. Voiced by: Chika Sakamoto (Japanese); Shawn Pleavin (English).

Dr. Go (剛くん, Gō-kun) - The main antagonist and a major antihero, an eccentric inventor who wishes world domination by creating cyborg cats as weapons of mass destruction. His plan completely backfired when Kuro took away the control chip and through sheer willpower of his own. He later stops from his plans in world domination and decides to live in a more peaceful way of living with Mi and later Kotaro. Although Kuro and his relationship is turbulent and hostile at times, Kuro does respects him as an inventor. His real name is Mantaro Go (剛万太郎, Gō Mantarō) Voiced by: Tōru Furusawa (Japanese); Colin Shelvoff (English).

Mi (ミーくん, Mī-kun) - A cyborg cat created by Dr. Go to at first save his life and later aid him in dominating the world. He appears as a frequent "goon" of his but is in fact kind-hearted and noble. At a later part of the story where Go accepts defeat and turns down on his conquest to world domination, he is now often seen helping him and in times helping Kuro too. Though they are more friendly rivals now, Mi and Kuro will often get into fights which are sometimes instigated by Mi himself. Although he is usually kind he, like Kuro, has a fierce temper when pushed. Opposite to Kuro, Mi prefers a sword as his standard weapon. With the Devil Chip, he can fuse himself to any weapon and create additional items to them. He is also a great cook. Voiced by: Chiharu Tezuka (Japanese); Michael Quinn (English).,

Matatabi (マタタビ, Matatabi)- A regular tabby cat who wears a red tattered "cloak" and has an eyepatch over his right eye. He was a childhood friend of Kuro, but he declared himself his enemy after a tussle leads to him losing his eye. He has an arsenal of weapons he hides in his cloak with his main weapon being a wooden boomerang which he can use to hit targets at great distances or a chainsaw. Though he is serious, he can be quite lazy and gluttonous with little self-control at times and sometimes needs to be forced by Kuro into helping. He is also skilled in craftsmanship and an experienced carpenter. He is the only one to refer to Kuro as Kid. Voiced by: Makiko Ohmoto (Japanese); Scott Evans (English).

Kotaro (コタロー, Kotarō)- A boy genius dressed in a cat suit who helps Dr. Go and Mi out by assisting in their inventions or building his own. He has an obsession over Kuro, and tries to prove to be as powerful as him. This idea of his was the result of being an outcast. He is experienced in technology, with an IQ of 200. The reviewer for Manga-News describes Kotaro as walling himself into his world of video games, but also regards Kotaro as an author surrogate. Voiced by: Rika Komatsu (Japanese); Andrea Kwan (English).

Nana (ナナちゃん, Nana-chan)- A female android with a rabbit-like appearance that was created by Kotaro from a table lamp. She develops a love interest in Kuro, who denies her; she accepts his rejection after numerous attempts to win his heart, though it is shown that he does care for her. She is also great at Knitting and often knits a scarf to Kuro. Voiced by: Hiromi Tsunakake (Japanese); Andrea Kwan (English).

=== Supporting ===
Grandpa and Grandma (ジーサン、バーサン, Jīsan, Bāsan) - The elderly couple who treat Kuro as a companion. They are not immune to trouble, never learn much, and are in need of Kuro's rescue frequently. However, they have no idea that Kuro is now a cyborg, though he intends to keep this secret. Voiced by: Junichi Sugawara and Satomi Korogi (Japanese); Rik Thomas and Andrea Kwan (English) respectively.

Ichiro Suzuki (鈴木 一郎, Suzuki Ichirō) - A schoolteacher who also admires Kuro. He is an avid otaku, and often gets himself involved into Kuro's shenanigans. Suzuki is portrayed by Toshiyuki Morikawa.

Megumi (めぐみ, Megumi) - A female firefighter who is Suzuki's crush. She is a quick thinker in most situations, such as putting out even the least dangerous of fires in her debut appearance in the anime. In the manga, Megumi was portrayed as an otaku like Suzuki but was toned down in the anime. Megumi is portrayed by Sayuri Yoshida.

Romeo (ロミオ, Romeo) and Juliet (ジュリエット, Jūrietto) - A duo of alien robot lovers. They are very optimistic, no matter what happens. They later marry and have a child together. Romeo is voiced by Kosuke Okano, while Juliet is voiced by Sayuri Yoshida.

Dunk (ダンク, Danku) - Kotaro's cyborg lion friend. He was an ordinary lion, but he was involved in a near-death experience. Dr. Go successfully revived him in his current cyborg form. Later on in the series Dunk gets modified by Kotaro's father who gives him the ability to speak using text boxes appear out of his head. Dunk is quite timid, gentle, and pure. He is voiced by Isshin Chiba.

Chieko Okada (岡田チエコ, Okada Chieko) - A girl with a deep hatred for Kuro and very powerful supernatural abilities, including ESP and telekinesis. Another notable feature of hers is her voluminous hair.

Goro Nagase (長瀬 五郎, Nagase Gōrō) - A boy Chieko met on a camping trip who came from an abusive household. He is a big dreamer, but he is a loser. He boasts a large scar from his abuse. He ends up being temporarily turned into a cyborg after being gravely injured with Cheiko attempting to teach him how to be human again. Goro only appeared in the manga.

=== Antagonists ===
Doctor White Woods (ドクターホワイトウッズ) known as Dr. Big (ドクターホワイトウッズ) in the anime who is an American mad scientist who came to Hokkaido to conquer the world but was defeated by Kuro and friends. His face is comically huge but has a very short stature. Like Dr. Go, he specializes in cyborg technology but with dogs which were powerful. He made only one appearance in the anime but made another in the manga as a security warden of a large prison. He also appears as the antagonist of the 2nd game and made a cyborg called BB, which looks just like Kuro. He is voiced by Isshin Chiba

Tendou (天道, tendo) - The rival of Doctor Go in the past as students and the guy responsible for the demise of Mi's mother. Unlike Go whose allies are cats and specializes in robot technology, Tendou prefers to use dogs and is proficient in genetic engineering and modified his dog Patrasche (パトラッシュ) who went around killing cats like Mi's mother on his command. He makes a reappearance in the anime years later where he attempts to use Kotaro's robotic knowledge to get revenge on Doctor Go. He is voiced by Naoki Tatsuta.

Nyan Nyan Army (ニャンニャンアーミー, Nyannyanāmī) - A squadron of cyborg cats created by Dr. Go. Mi is the first in the line, created by Go from the remains of his pet kitten. There are four other remaining members who used to be strays taken care of by Go in his younger days before being gravely injured by a fire - #2, nicknamed Spyder, who can expand his arms, legs, and neck, #3, who also fights with his own sword and boasts a panda disguise, #4, who also has a bad temper and has a fierce hatred of Kuro for ruining Dr. Go's plans and humiliating him several times, and #5, who is seen with a robot companion, Lassie, and also uses a Gatling gun. #2 is voiced by Yuko Sasamoto, #3 is voiced by Rika Komatsu, #4 is voiced by Sayuri Yoshida and #5 is voiced by Mami Nakajima.

=== Others ===
Kazuma (カズマ) is one of Suzuki's class representative. Despite being a class representative, he skips classes and makes a fool of Suzuki like other students. Along with Satoko, they appear a lot out of the other students and sometimes come along on adventures. He is voiced by Rika Komatsu.

Satoko Yoshino (吉野 里子, Yoshino Satoko) is one of Suzuki's class representatives. As a class representative, she is kind and takes her responsibilities serious and kindly guided Chieko who had just transferred, around the town. Like Kazuma, they appear a lot out of the other students and sometimes come along on adventures. She is voiced by Yuko Sasamoto.

YaYaYa aliens (ヤーヤーヤー星人, Yāyāyā boshijin) - A trio of friendly aliens that boast incredibly dangerous weapons. They are often also seen wearing special bracelets that can enlarge or shrink their targets. Their names are Yai (ヤーイ, Yāi), Yasu (ヤースー, Yāsū), and Yachi (ヤーチー, Yāchī); Yai is the leader. The aliens are anime-original characters.

Princess Mimi (ミミ姫, Mimi-hime) - An alien princess who closely resembles Nana. Malo was supposed to marry her, but she refused and ran away. Despite her ladylike looks, she is actually quite selfish, she only appears in the anime and is voiced by Hiromi Tsunakake.

Prince Malo (マロ王子, Maro-ōji) - An alien prince of the YaYaYa group. He bears a striking resemblance to Kuro. Malo is supposed to be courteous and he has the opposite personality from Kuro, but he eats like a vampire, and he also boasts offensive British gas, he only appears in the anime and is voiced by Chika Sakamoto

Yo (よくん, Yokun) - A caricature of the manga's creator, Naoki Yokouchi. He makes fleeting appearances in some anime episodes. He is depicted wearing a purple trenchcoat with a similarly colored hat.

Pooly (プーリィ, Pūryi) - A stray pink poodle who was Kuro's crush in the beginning of the series. In the anime version, she lived in a house but moved away. She is voiced by Yuko Sasamoto.

Lily (リリィ, Riryi) - Mi's first love. She was abandoned by her owner and lived as a stray for a brief time before being adopted by a girl she had saved from an accident. She is voiced by Yuko Sasamoto.

Marie (マリー, Marī) - A stray dog in Kuro's past with a similar appearance to Pooly, but with pointed ears. She had been a surrogate mother to Kuro as a baby for a brief time before he was taken. She is in the manga only.

== Media ==
=== Manga ===
The manga was originally released in issues of Comic BomBom from September 1997 until December 2001 with a total of 56 chapters. The chapters were then released across eleven volumes by Kodansha between 1998 and 2002. In Germany, Egmont Manga & Anime published the first three volumes. In France, Pika Édition published the entire series. It has been published in Indonesia by M&C Comics.

A sequel series, Cyborg Kuro-chan: Extra Battle (サイボーグクロちゃん 番外バトル, Saibōgu Kurochan Bangai Batoru) was published from 2005 to 2006. Like the original, it has been published in Indonesia by M&C Comics.

| No. | Japanese release date | Japanese ISBN |
|---|---|---|
| 01 | 6 February 1998 | 978-4-06-321832-9 |
| 02 | 7 May 1998 | 978-4-06-321839-8 |
| 03 | 4 September 1998 | 978-4-06-321848-0 |
| 04 | 5 February 1999 | 978-4-06-323861-7 |
| 05 | 4 June 1999 | 978-4-06-323873-0 |
| 06 | 5 November 1999 | 978-4-06-323884-6 |
| 07 | 6 April 2000 | 978-4-06-323894-5 |
| 08 | 4 August 2000 | 978-4-06-323904-1 |
| 09 | 6 February 2001 | 978-4-06-323912-6 |
| 10 | 6 August 2001 | 978-4-06-323926-3 |
| 11 | 5 January 2002 | 978-4-06-323937-9 |

=== Anime ===
Cyborg Kuro-chan was adapted into an anime series produced by Studio Bogey for TV Tokyo. The anime aired at 8:00 am on Saturdays on TV Aichi affiliated networks from 2 October 1999 to 30 December 2000 for 66 episodes. The series was initially ordered for 26 episodes, but production was later extended to the end of March 2001, with the intended episode count now at about 78. However, producers Studio Bogey and Public & Basic declared bankruptcy in December 2000. Episode 66 was finished and aired after the bankruptcy, and would be the last episode of the series; episodes 67–72 were promoted in Japan's Telemaga magazine, but never aired, while episodes 67–78 were replaced with rebroadcasts of older episodes.

The opening theme is Guruguru Kuro-chan by Lady Q, who also sung Damedame no Uta for Crayon Shin-chan. Two closing themes were created, those being Positive Vibration by Sister K, and Parapara Kuro-chan by Kyuu. The anime has been exported to several countries in Asia, Europe, and Africa. It has been broadcast on such channels including Spacetoon and Italia 1. While the Tagalog Dub aired in the early 2000s had its opening theme performed by the Rap Group Salbakuta. The Italia 1 airing had an Italian opening that was sung by regular contributor Cristina D'Avena and Giorgio Vanni, titled "Roba da gatti". In India it aired titled Auto Cat. Naoki Tatsuta was the narrator, a caricature of the creator of the manga.

==== Episodes ====
| No. | Title | Original release date |
|---|---|---|
| 1 | "The Strongest Cat is Born!"; Transliteration: "Saikyou no nyanko tanjou!" (Japanese: 最強のニャンコ誕生!) | 2 October 1999 |
Kuro wakes up in Dr. Go's lab after being kidnapped and repaired to become a cyborg. However, Kuro manages to break his control chip, and he sets off to return to his owners' home.
| 2 | "Meow Meow Army"; Transliteration: "Nyan-Nyan Āmī" (Japanese: ニャンニャンアーミー) | 9 October 1999 |
Kuro and his owners are invited to a contest at a local store. Kuro, however, realizes this as a ruse set up by Dr. Go and his army of robot cats.
| 3 | "Highway to Hell"; Transliteration: "Jigoku no haiwei" (Japanese: 地獄のハイウェイ) | 16 October 1999 |
Dr. Go creates a chip that allows Mi to penetrate metal objects and transform them at will. Mi goes out of control with this and eventually becomes a mechanically engineered automobile, which Kuro must chase down.
| 4 | "The Appearance of the Flying Robot Family!"; Transliteration: "Sora tobu oyako robo shutsugen!" (Japanese: 空とぶ親子ロボ出現!) | 23 October 1999 |
Dr. Go constructs two robots: Big Sam and Little Sam. He accidentally sets off a self-destruct bomb within Big Sam and is trapped inside. Kuro and Mi are forced to work together to deactivate the bomb and save the doctor, who, by that time, has already escaped.
| 5 | "The First Love of Mi-kun"; Transliteration: "Mī-kun no hatsukoi" (Japanese: ミーくんの初恋) | 30 October 1999 |
Mi falls in love with one of the dogs in the neighbourhood, but he does not have the courage to speak to her. He disguises himself as a dog to make things easier. But Go hears this and builds a robot named Hirosue to be Mi's girlfriend.
| 6 | "Mi-kun Gets Kidnapped"; Transliteration: "Mī-kun yuukai jiken" (Japanese: ミーくん誘拐事件) | 6 November 1999 |
The alien robot Romeo abducts Mi and heads for the South Pole, with Kuro and Dr. Go giving chase. They find a UFO in the ice while looking for him, and fix it, though this leads to a troupe of aliens attempting to conquer Earth.
| 7 | "The Biggest Game of Tag in History"; Transliteration: "Shijou saidai no onigokko" (Japanese: 史上最大のオニゴッコ) | 13 November 1999 |
Romeo finds life on Earth to be boring, He decides to hold Kuro's owners and Dr. Go inside a bomb-filled dome, Kuro and Mi are forced to hunt down Romeo, with Kuro teaming up with school teacher Suzuki to help stop him.
| 8 | "Kuro and Mi's Idol Game"; Transliteration: "Kuro Mī aidoru shoubu" (Japanese: クロミーアイドル勝負) | 20 November 1999 |
Kuro decides to join Suzuki and his class on a field trip. Mi ends up joining them and after a fight with Kuro the two end up causing problems for the class
| 9 | "The Legend Behind the School"; Transliteration: "Gakkō no ura dentetsu" (Japanese: 学校の裏伝説) | 27 November 1999 |
Suzuki has been down in the dumps lately, so Kuro, Mi, Dr. Go, Romeo and two of his students (Yoshino and Kazuma) pay him a visit to cheer him up. Go-kun stumbles upon a treasure map, and he leads the group on a trek up a nearby mountain, with dire obstacles to overcome.
| 10 | "The Underground People Behind the Mountain"; Transliteration: "Urayama no ichi tsūme chiteījin" (Japanese: 裏山の一ツ目地底人) | 4 December 1999 |
During the trek, Kuro and the gang fight against one-eyed aliens, and they get themselves surrounded. We also learn that Romeo was once a robot slave for the aliens after he is reunited with a fellow alien and romantic interest Juliet
| 11 | "Boy Genius Kotaro Appears"; Transliteration: "Tensai shōnen kotarō toujou" (Japanese: 天才少年コタロー登場) | 11 December 1999 |
Kuro is on edge after seeing an imposter causing trouble for a fleet of battleships. Kuro orders Go and Mi to join them assuming they're responsible. Once aboard the ship, they find a kid named Kotaro is responsible. Kotaro is very intelligent with tech and science as he encourages the cats to join him in a dangerous real-life role-playing game.
| 12 | "Devil Mi Appears"; Transliteration: "Debiru Mī ara waru" (Japanese: デビルミーあらわる) | 18 December 1999 |
Dr. Go finds a relic that ends up possessing him, with Mi saving him and offering himself as a sacrifice. Now Mi is possessed so Kuro and Go must team up to save their friend.
| 13 | "The Fight in the Cage"; Transliteration: "Ori no naka no tataki" (Japanese: 檻の中の戦い) | 25 December 1999 |
Kotaro is on the run with a lion named Dunk who he helped break free from the zoo. Kuro and Mi eventually join them as they help the two avoid capture and fight off the armed soldiers.
| 14 | "Go and Kotaro's Great Experiment"; Transliteration: "Gō to Kotaro no daijikken" (Japanese: 剛とコタローの大実験) | 29 December 1999 |
Dr. Go and Kotaro construct a cyborg mouse out of the remains of his former self. The mouse proceeds to invade the city as it begins creating an army of smaller mice. Kuro, Mi, Go, Kotaro and later Suzuki, team up to flush out the robot vermin from the city.: This episode was the only episode not to air on a Saturday at 8am, airing on a Wednesday at 7:30 am. This was most likely due to the following Saturday being New Year Day, and if airing on that day this might've resulted in lower viewership ratings.
| 15 | "Matatabi Visits!"; Transliteration: "Matatabi sanjō!" (Japanese: マタタビ参上!) | 8 January 2000 |
Kuro is visited by an old friend, Matatabi, who knew him as "Kid". The tiger cat had asks Mi, Go and Kotaro where "Kid" is so they go to Kuro as a possible lead. Turns out Kuro is the cat referred to as "Kid" and the two end up getting into a destructive battle.
| 16 | "Kuro-chan Runs Away"; Transliteration: "Kuro-chan no iede" (Japanese: クロちゃんの家出) | 15 January 2000 |
Kotaro recycles a lamp into a small robot to use as a house cleaner of sorts. He names her Nana and she runs away not long after her creation. Kuro also runs away after getting into a fight with Matatabi. The two end up meeting with Nana falling in love with Kuro
| 17 | "A Big Duel in the snow!" Transliteration: "Yuki no naka no daikettō!" (Japanese: 雪の中の大決闘!) | 22 January 2000 |
Gotch, a cat from Kuro and Matatabi's past, and his gang make a surprise attack at Kuro's house while Kuro and friends are away at a party
| 18 | "Beautiful Firefighter! Megumi"; Transliteration: "Bishōjō shōbō shi! Megumi" (Japanese: 美少女消防士! めぐみ) | 29 January 2000 |
Kuro and Suzuki meet the firefighter Megumi, who is willing to put out any fire, literally... While Dr. Go showcases a new robot to Suzuki's class, Megumi shows up and the robot also falls in love with her, which turns into yet another pursuit.
| 19 | "Roaring! Battleborg"; Transliteration: "Bakushō! Batorubōgu" (Japanese: 爆走! バトルボーグ) | 5 February 2000 |
Dr. Go and Kotaro build a battle car based on himself which goes on a rampage. Kuro and Mi decide to team up to chase it down, using their own modified vehicles. This was the first episode not to be an adaptation from the manga. It is also somewhat of a tie-in, with Kuro and Mi's vehicles being based on the Battleborg motorised toys released by TOMY in 1999.
| 20 | "Kuro Becomes a Father!?"; Transliteration: "Kuro, papa ni naru!?" (Japanese: クロ、パパになる!?) | 12 February 2000 |
Nana wants to attract Kuro once again, so she . Things are going to plan, until Go decides to install a bomb inside the robot.
| 21 | "The Incoherent Battle"; Transliteration: "Hachamecha dai sōdatsu sen" (Japanese: ハチャメチャ大争奪戦) | 19 February 2000 |
Fukakyon, a cat from Hawaii visits Kuro and confesses her love for him. Kuro rejects her and in frustration, Fukakyon runs off with his suit with Kuro and his friends grouping together to chase her down and get it back.
| 22 | "Suzuki's First Date"; Transliteration: "Suzuki no hatsu dēto" (Japanese: 鈴木の初デート) | 26 February 2000 |
Suzuki invites Megumi out, and he agrees to take her on a rollercoaster ride. However, he is afraid of heights, so Dr. Go creates a pair of glasses that create the illusion he is somewhere else. This goes well until a gang of villains take over the park with their giant robot.
| 23 | "Evil Hebibinga"; Transliteration: "Hebibingā ara waru" (Japanese: へビビンガーあらわる) | 4 March 2000 |
The grandparents have not gone out in a long time, so they agree to go on a trip with Kuro tagging along to make sure they're safe. During the plane trip, armed hijackers take over and after a failed attempt to stop them, Kuro falls out of the plane and lands in the Amazon Rain Forest. While there, he encounters a group of TV reporters who are looking for Hebibinga, a giant snake-like creature with human legs.
| 24 | "Saving Kotaro!"; Transliteration: "Kotarō o sukue!" (Japanese: コタローを救え!) | 11 March 2000 |
Kotaro finds a bottle containing a deadly zombie virus making him sick and potentially dangerous. Go reads about an antidote made from the tooth of a walking snake. Kuro realises this is Hebibinga, and after seeing a news report about the creature heading to Hokkaido, Kuro, Mi and Dunk rush off get the tooth they need for the antidote.
| 25 | "Kotaro's Father"; Transliteration: "Kotarō no chichi kaeru" (Japanese: コタローの父かえる) | 18 March 2000 |
Go, Mi and Kotaro are confronted by the police. After they're fought off, Kotaro's father shows up, revealing he was on the run from them. Kotaro doesn't care about his return due to the fact that he ran away and caused problems for their family. The two are forced to team up however when the police return with backup and robots.
| 26 | "The World Domination Plan Begins?!"; Transliteration: "Sekai seifuku keikaku kaishi?!" (Japanese: 世界征服計画開始?!) | 25 March 2000 |
A tall creature shows up at Kuro's house asking for the whereabouts of Dr. Go. The creature turns out to be the Meow Meow Army in disguise, who were separated after the demolition of the store in episode 2. The cats discuss their world domination plans with Go who appears to show little interest in the idea anymore.: Episode 26 was originally planned to be the final episode. However, due to popularity, the production of new episodes was extended. The first VHS series somewhat reflects this however, with the first line consisting of the first 26 episodes.
| 27 | "The Beginning of a New World"; Transliteration: "Isekai koto no hajimari" (Japanese: 異世界・事のはじまり) | 1 April 2000 |
During a heavy snowstorm, Matatabi realises that the snow on the roof of the Fuji house could cause it to collapse, He recruits Kuro and friends to help remove the snow. After little progress they realise building a bonfire helps melt the snow but a mishap occurs when Romeo and Juliet ad a missile to the fuel causing a rift to open up and transport them to a desert-like world during an ongoing war.
| 28 | "The City in the Desert"; Transliteration: "Sabaku ni ukabu toshi" (Japanese: 砂漠に浮かぶ都市) | 8 April 2000 |
Still stranded, Kotaro meets a traveller, Fox and her companion Gurnee. They inform Kotaro about the war, which was caused by the two sons of the former king fighting for power, as well as the mystery of a pyramid-like structure known as Taboo. As the group disbanded, Kuro explores the desert and with help from a cyborg named Vice, search around for Nana and Juliet. Romeo is also ordered to take over the role of the older brother who died, so their army isn't overthrown by the other brother.
| 29 | "The New World Collapses"; Transliteration: "Isekai hōkai no ato" (Japanese: 異世界・崩壊のあと) | 15 April 2000 |
Still stranded in the new world, Nana ends up being captured by Vice as Kuro and Juliet regroup. They later reunite with Go and Matatabi and after talking with the locals, head off the find Taboo. the two armies, as well as Kotaro and Fox, are also heading there as tensions begin to rise. We also learn Fox is real name is Shisuka, as well as her true role in the conflict.
| 30 | "The End of the New World"; Transliteration: "Shūmatsu kara shin sekai he" (Japanese: 終末から新世界へ) | 22 April 2000 |
The conflict reaches its peak, with he two armies on their way to Taboo in order to gain rule of the land. Kotaro and Shisuka are still searching for the entrance to Taboo as well as a way to end the fighting and escape the desert world for good. Kuro leaves the group who're still searching for an escape, eventually leading to a standoff with Vice.
| 31 | "The Secret Birth of Mi-kun"; Transliteration: "Mī-kun tanjō no himitsu" (Japanese: ミーくん誕生のヒミツ) | 29 April 2000 |
Mi remembers when he first met Dr. Go as a normal kitten who was separated from his mother, who sacrificed her life to save him. The two became fast friends, and, along with an incompetent robot companion. Problems arise as Go's rival Tendou starts causing problems with his pet dog, who was actually responsible for the death of Mi's mother. Go and Mi are brought closer together as they try to make it through their hardships in life.
| 32 | "The Great Honeymoon War!?"; Transliteration: "Hane mūn dai sensō?!" (Japanese: ハネムーン大戦争!?) | 6 May 2000 |
Kuro's owners are reminiscing about their old holidays, which is perfectly timed as Nana wins tickets for a trip abroad. Mi and Go hear about this and decide to steal the tickets. Since the trip has been planned, Kuro must fight them to get the tickets back in time.
| 33 | "School Ghost Extermination"; Transliteration: "Gakkō de obake taiji" (Japanese: 学校でオバケ退治) | 13 May 2000 |
The school where Suzuki works is plagued by various paranormal events. Kuro, Dr. Go and Mi help him find out the cause of these events, but they later find out this was all a set up.
| 34 | "The Lottery Prize Battle Race"; Transliteration: "Takara kuji dai batoru rēsu" (Japanese: 宝クジ大バトルレース) | 20 May 2000 |
The grandparents stumble upon a special ticket, and they discover its grand prize - ¥300,000,000. The ticket ends up blowing away, leading to a race between, Kuro, Mi, Go, Kotaro and a member of the self defence force.
| 35 | "Matatabi's Great Training?!"; Transliteration: "Matatabi no dai shugyō?!" (Japanese: マタタビの大修行?!) | 27 May 2000 |
Frustrated with rebuilding the house repeatedly, Matatabi decides he's had enough and runs off to live somewhere else. He ends up meeting a young boy who lives in a mansion and is very wealthy. Matatabi decides to live with him becoming accustomed to this new way of life.
| 36 | "Protecting the Little Cats!"; Transliteration: "Chibi neko tachi o mamore!" (Japanese: チビネコたちを守れ!) | 3 June 2000 |
Kuro befriends a kitten called Butch and his younger siblings after saving them from a dog attack, They inform him that they are under constant ambush from a pack of cyborg dogs. The dogs happen to be under the control of an American scientist, Big (known as Whitewoods in the manga), They're overpowered but later get some help from Dr. Go who modifies the kittens with cybernetic upgrades. Now with more power and backup from Go, Mi and Kotaro, they get their revenge on the deranged doctor.
| 37 | "The Non-Stop Bus Trip"; Transliteration: "Nonsutoppu basu ryokō" (Japanese: ノンストップバス旅行) | 10 June 2000 |
The grandparents receive bus tickets. Kuro joins them, but Dr. Go, Mi, Kotaro, Romeo, Juliet, and even Nana follow. The bus ride leads to trouble when Kuro and the others discover a bomb and they realize that the bus trip is a ruse created by the member of the aliens from previous episodes.
| 38 | "The Battle Against a White Monster"; Transliteration: "Shiroi kaibutsu to no dai batoru" (Japanese: 白い怪物との大バトル) | 17 June 2000 |
The grandparents have decided to go on a romantic trip to the ocean. Kuro of course joins with Go, Mi and Kotaro tagging along. There they meet Ahab who informs them about a giant fish living in the sea. After the beast attacks and swallows Kuro's owners, they're forced to stop the monster and save them.
| 39 | "Mi-kun #2 Is Here!"; Transliteration: "Mī-kun ni-gō tōjō!" (Japanese: ミーくん2号登場!) | 24 June 2000 |
After they run out of ramen ingredients, Mi, Dr. Go, and Kotaro plan a bank heist. A gang of robbers have already beat them to the punch and hold everyone as hostages. Mi ends up creating a smaller copy of himself to send out and alert Kuro, but the two end up getting into a fight which nearly destroys the city.
| 40 | "Nana-chan Tries Her Best!"; Transliteration: "Nana-chan ganbaru!" (Japanese: ナナちゃんがんばる!) | 1 July 2000 |
After Kuro has a falling-out with Nana, she storms off in anger and tries various jobs such as working as chef and construction workers. After failing both, Nana ends up joining the robbers from the previous episode.
| 41 | "Resurrection! The Devil Returns!"; Transliteration: "Fukkatsu! Debiru sai tōjō!" (Japanese: 復活! デビル再登場!) | 8 July 2000 |
The chef devil doll that possessed Mi in episode 12 returns, and he stirs up more trouble, plunging the world into darkness, kidnapping Nana and temporarily possessing Matatabi and the One-Eyed People. Kuro, Dr. Go and Kotaro team up to chase down the evil creature, as well as finding a variety of gadgets and weapons on their travels.: This episode is an adaptation of the Game Boy Color game Cyborg Kuro-chan Devil Fukkatsu.
| 42 | "The Decisive Battle! Kuro vs The Devil"; Transliteration: "Kessen! Kuro tai Debiru" (Japanese: 決戦! クロ対デビル) | 15 July 2000 |
Barely escaping from collapsing ruins, Kuro and the others face off with the demon, who possesses Hebibinga, the Sam Robots, Mi and even a giant version of him made from scrap. As pursuit continues, Kuro becomes even more determined to stop the evil creature and save Nana.: This episode is also based on Cyborg Kuro-chan Devil Fukkatsu.
| 43 | "Kuro Moves House"; Transliteration: "Kuro no ie ni o hikkoshi" (Japanese: クロの家にお引っ越し) | 22 July 2000 |
Kuro and his owners are built a new much larger home, with even Kuro's friends moving in with them. Problems begin to arise when an armed group takes over and hold the residents hostage.
| 44 | "Where are you Kotaro?"; Transliteration: "Kotarō i naku naru?" (Japanese: コタローいなくなる?) | 29 July 2000 |
On a hot day, Kotaro and his friend, Dunk, are invited by a mysterious man to his own house, where he has his own goods and even a personalized organizer. They later find out the man is Go's old rival Tendou who holds them captive as well as unleashing his cyborg dog for Kuro and Mi to fight.
| 45 | "Fear of the Great Virus!!"; Transliteration: "Kyōfu no dai uirusu!!" (Japanese: 恐怖の大ウイルス!!) | 5 August 2000 |
Nana notices that Kuro is sick! Distraught, she rushes to Dr. Go for help. He discovers that Kuro has been infected by a cyborg virus! Kotaro creates an antibody to help fight it, but he accidentally injects it into Hirosue, who ends up going on a rampage. Dr. Go and Kotaro shrink down in an attempt to contain the antibody while Mi and Nana try to stop Hirosue while also taking care of Kuro.
| 46 | "The Encounter With Matatabi"; Transliteration: "Matatabi to no deai" (Japanese: マタタビとの出会い) | 12 August 2000 |
Kuro is on life support after the events of the last episode. He begins to have a flashback of when he was a young kitten. He meets Matatabi as well as a gang of other stray cats, who end up in a panic after a gang attack them.
| 47 | "The Fight With the Crows!!"; Transliteration: "Karasu to no tatakai!!" (Japanese: カラスとの戦い!!) | 19 August 2000 |
Still on life support, Kuro remembers more of his life as a normal cat. This time they must deal with a flock of crows who are attacking the cats.
| 48 | "Kid's Final Fight!!"; Transliteration: "Kiddo saigo no tatakai!!" (Japanese: キッド最後の戦い!!) | 26 August 2000 |
Nana takes off with Kuro just as he is recovering. While so, he dreams again about his past once again. This time, conflicts arise between the cats and another gang of strays. Kuro tries to leave in panic but gets into a fight with members of his group, just before the bigger fight begins.
| 49 | "Meow Meow Land"; Transliteration: "Nyan-Nyan Rando" (Japanese: ニャンニャンランド) | 2 September 2000 |
Kuro and friends are greeted with fliers for a theme park named Meow Meow Land. They all decide to visit, but soon realise it was a setup by the Meow Meow Army.
| 50 | "True Wild Kuro-chan!"; Transliteration: "Shin bousou Kuro-chan!" (Japanese: 真・暴走クロちゃん!) | 9 September 2000 |
In the previous episode, #4 and #5 transformed Kuro into a reckless fighting machine. Hungry for destruction Mi, Go, Kotaro, Nana, Suzuki, Romeo and Juliet all work together to find and stop Kuro's explosive rage.
| 51 | "Kuro and Mi's Showdown Game"; Transliteration: "Kuro Mī gēmu taiketsu" (Japanese: クロ・ミーゲーム対決) | 16 September 2000 |
The home of Go, Mi and Kotaro randomly explodes so Matatabi agrees to build them a larger more impressive residence. Kuro and Mi however decided to battle each other using armed mechs with some help from Suzuki's students.
| 52 | "The Transfer Student With Supernatural Powers?!"; Transliteration: "Tenkousei ha chou nouryoku sha?!" (Japanese: 転校生は超能力者?!) | 23 September 2000 |
Chieko Okada is the new kid at school. She boasts incredible psychic abilities, which she uses to overcome her problems. Megumi, Kazuma and Yoshino introduce her to Kuro's friends, but Chieko recognizes him as the one who ruined her relationship, as he was in his Rampage state at that time. This leads to Chieko chasing down Kuro in an act of revenge.
| 53 | "The Message From Space"; Transliteration: "Uchuu kara no messēji" (Japanese: 宇宙からのメッセージ) | 30 September 2000 |
Suzuki receives a message from an alien trio. He and his class go on an unexpected field trip to a space station with help from Mi, Go and Kotaro, as they plan on contacting the aliens. As they enter the city Kuro sees them as a threat and heads off to fight them. Chaos continues as Suzuki peacefully talks with the aliens and Kuro attacks them.: This was the last episode to be fully animated using traditional animation.
| 54 | "The YaYaYa Aliens Attack"; Transliteration: "Kōgeki Yāyāyā boshijin" (Japanese: 攻撃ヤーヤーヤー星人) | 7 October 2000 |
In a continuation of last week's debacle, Suzuki is saved by the aliens and ends up befriending them. Kuro continues to see the aliens as a threat, even more now as he realises their equipment is extremely powerful. Another back and forth occurs with Suzuki explaining he is safe and Kuro still believing he is in danger.
| 55 | "The Last Day on Earth is Coming!"; Transliteration: "Chikyuu saigo no hi ki taru!" (Japanese: 地球最後の日来たる!) | 14 October 2000 |
Megumi and Nana come to Suzuki's aid as the alien trio become weaker. They decide to provide them with massive amounts of bananas, not realise that Kuro and Mi are continuing their plan of attack.
| 56 | "The Birth of a Horrifying Baby!"; Transliteration: "Kyoufu no beibī tanjou!" (Japanese: 恐怖のベイビー誕生!) | 21 October 2000 |
Romeo and Juliet have got married! The newlyweds decide to take their friends out on a ride through the city, showing off their new child during the trip. Both the baby and its parents actions start to become dangerous however: This was the last episode to be adapted from the manga.
| 57 | "The Fight Between Kuro and Nana"; Transliteration: "Kuro to Nana no kenka" (Japanese: クロとナナのけんか) | 28 October 2000 |
Kuro and Nana end up getting into a fight. Matatabi groups together a bunch of their friends to help, however this escalates into a gender based fight between the two groups.
| 58 | "The YaYaYa Return"; Transliteration: "Mata ki ta Yāyāyā" (Japanese: また来たヤーヤーヤー) | 4 November 2000 |
The YaYaYa aliens meet with Megumi at her apartment and show off their devices which can shrink objects. Kuro's owners end up getting ahold of one and are shrunken down. Kuro, Mi, Nana Suzuki and Megumi shrink themselves down while escaping various giant creatures to save the old couple.
| 59 | "Nana Becomes a Princess?"; Transliteration: "Nana ohimesama ni naru?" (Japanese: ナナお姫様になる?) | 11 November 2000 |
Nana is upset after Kuro rejects her. After meeting up with Megumi they meet Prince Malo, an alien who resembles Kuro. He decides to make Nana into a princess, swapping roles with their current princess, Princess Mimi, who resembles Nana. After Mimi explains what's going on, Kuro decides to search for Malo's lair in order to save Nana.
| 60 | "Challenge of Matatabi"; Transliteration: "Matatabi kara no chousen jou" (Japanese: マタタビからの挑戦状) | 18 November 2000 |
Kuro is attacked at his home, later finding out that Matatabi is responsible. After a battle between the two cats, they later find that Matatabi is under mind control, Dr. Go's rival Tendou being responsible. Tendou then sends out a trio of mutant dogs to cause even more trouble for Kuro.
| 61 | "The Big Muscular Beauty Battle!?"; Transliteration: "Kinniku bijo dai batoru!?" (Japanese: 筋肉美女大バトル!?) | 25 November 2000 |
Kuro learns about a fitness contest being held in the city, with a bunch of his friends participating in the event. One of the contestants is a young blonde woman wanting to help a group of kids, but two guys are also trying to ruin the contest for her.
| 62 | "Suzuki's Present Strategy"; Transliteration: "Suzuki no purezento sakusen" (Japanese: 鈴木のプレゼント作戦) | 2 December 2000 |
Suzuki needs advice in finding Megumi the perfect gift. After running into Kotaro, they decide on a necklace Dr. Go made. Little do either of them know, part of it was built to freeze terrains, sending Go and Mi into a state of panic. Using its tracking device, Kuro and his friends set out to save Megumi.
| 63 | "The Scrap King Appears"; Transliteration: "Sukurappu kingu toujou" (Japanese: スクラップキング登場) | 9 December 2000 |
While fishing Mi is suddenly dragged out to sea. With help from Ahab from episode 38 Dr. Go and Kotaro find out he's in the middle of the ocean and that a giant meteorite is coming towards them. After a giant tsunami, the garbage around Go's home has vanished, forming into a giant monster made out of scrap which must be dealt with.
| 64 | "Courier From Space"; Transliteration: "Uchuu kara no takuhai bin" (Japanese: 宇宙からの宅配便) | 16 December 2000 |
There is a delivery with Romeo's name on it. Kuro and the others cannot find out what it is. Romeo explains it could explode as well as an ongoing conflict with him and Juliet.
| 65 | "Kotaro's Christmas"; Transliteration: "Kotarō no Kurisumasu" (Japanese: コタローのクリスマス) | 23 December 2000 |
Kotaro sees an elderly man and woman are asking for money and decides to help them. He is later stopped by a policeman who tells him that they are scammers. Kotaro does not believe this however and runs away, locking himself in a modified building. Kuro and friends must team up to try and convince Kotaro to stop.
| 66 | "Big Shopping Date Duel!"; Transliteration: "Kaimono dēto dai kettō!" (Japanese: 買い物デート大決闘!) | 30 December 2000 |
Princess Mimi shrinks down Nana and then orders Kuro to take her shopping. Everything goes well until Kuro gets into a battle with Matatabi. The two begin fighting, resulting in large amounts of damage to the town.

=== Home Media ===
In Japan, the anime was released on VHS by Media Factory and Public & Basic (PIBI). The first series was of tapes were episodes 1–26. a 2nd series was released but was rental only. only the first 53 episodes were released after Public & Basic shut down. The series was later released in Japan on several video streaming services such as Amazon Video and U-NEXT. No DVDs or Blu-rays have been released in Japan, likely due to licensing issues regarding the defunct production companies. Other countries like Indonesia and China saw the episodes released on VCD. Episodes have been uploaded onto YouTube worldwide by Mondo World, owned by Grupa BB Media Ltd., who own the distribution rights to the series in Europe, but these uploads were removed in 2026.

=== Other Merchandice ===
==== Music releases ====
Three Cyborg Kuro-chan CDs were released. The first one (Guru Guru Kuro-chan) was a CD single released on 25 November 1999, featuring extended versions of the shows opening and ending. The second release (Cyborg Kuro-chan: strongest Uchimakuri Music Encyclopedia TV - Original Soundtrack) was released on 21 June 2000 and contained most of the tracks used in the anime. The third and final release (Cyborg Kuro-chan Gatling mix) was released on 18 November 2000 but unlike the other CD, the content of this CD mainly consists of remixes of tracks from the previous releases.

==== Toys ====
Takara Tomy made toys based on the characters. In 1999 the company released posable figures of the characters which included bendable limbs and detachable weapons, they also made trading cards and figures of Kuro and Mi with action features. In 2000 the company release 4 vehicle toys based on the Battleborgs from episode 19 of the anime, Matatabi, Kuro, Mi and Cyborg Kuro were released. Tomy also made special boxed figures which contained many accessories including weapons. These were the last Kuro-chan toys released by Tomy.

==== Video Games ====
The cover of Cyborg Kuro-chan: Devil Fukkatsu!! for Game Boy Color.

Konami published video games based on the series. Kaettekita Cyborg Kuro-Chan (帰ってきた サイボーグクロちゃん, Cyborg Kuro-chan Came Back), a shoot 'em up, was released for the PlayStation on 28 November 2002. Two Game Boy Color games were also released: Cyborg Kuro-chan: Devil Fukkatsu!! (サイボーグクロちゃん デビル復活!!, Cyborg Kuro-chan: Devil's Revival) on 23 March 2000, and Cyborg Kuro-chan 2: White Woods no Gyakushū (サイボーグクロちゃん2 ホワイトウッズの逆襲, Cyborg Kuro-chan: White Woods' Counterattack!!) on 19 October 2000. Official game guides were released for the Game Boy Color games. Taiwanese developer Lonaisoft also published a Windows game in 2002 under the title Pīlì Kùlè Māo (霹靂酷樂貓); this was a 2D platform shooter loosely inspired by Mega Man.

== Reception ==
Christian Hess, writing for the German site Animepro, noted the "thin storyline" of the manga. Malindy Hetfield, writing for Splashcomics, felt that the artwork was closer to a child's drawing style than a manga style. She felt the parodies in the second volume were very funny, cautioning that one needed to become accustomed to the drawing style, and summed up the third volume as "You want hearty humor, wacky drawings, absolutely crazy characters and the greatest orgy of destruction that can be accommodated in 170 pages? Well then, let's go and buy!" Nicholas Demay compared the series with Samurai Pizza Cats, and described the drawing style as cartoonish, feeling that it supported the surreal tone of the manga, by reminding the reader that despite the "explosive ambiance" that this is a humorous series, intended for children. He felt that by the fourth volume, it was clear that Yokouchi intended to use simple characterisations (especially in Dr. Go's case), but felt that this was effective and heightened the contrast between the cuteness of the series and its depictions of mass destruction. Demay felt that the fifth volume, taking place in an alternate dimension, was a chance for Yokouchi to renew himself and to have a change of scenery, and noted that the backgrounds in this sequence are more detailed than usual. He felt that the story of Kuro-chan and Nana's true relationship was "cute and funny". Demay found the ninth volume "bleak", and hoped it was not a sign that the series was becoming tired, but was relieved to find that the tenth volume returned to humorous storylines. Demay was more prepared for the final volume's focus on action rather than comedy, but appreciated that the author "sprinkled through" many gags, which Demay felt Cyborg Kuro-chan would not be the same without, feeling that it was an honorable conclusion to the series.

The reviewer for Manga-News felt that the parodies of the early volumes quickly ran thin, and that the author's attempt to revive the series by adding in multiple characters left the reviewer confused. He felt that the later volumes' turn into emotional scenes and tragedy did not suit the series. He noted the Die Hard parody in the second volume, and felt that the references to Japanese culture in this volume were not adequately explained by Pika in the appendix. Despite this, he felt that it was accessible to a wide audience as most of the gags were visual gags. He described Kuro-chan as "a cross between Astroboy and Felix the Cat on acid". He felt that the translation sometimes altered jokes when they were clear in the original, for example, removing a reference to Pikachu. The reviewer for Manga-News noted that although the fifth volume concerned a more serious initial scenario and could be read independently of the others, that the storyline was more of the same silly humor and exaggerated violence. He felt that in the sixth volume, a "naive sentimentalism" clashed with the general ambiance of the series. In the seventh volume, there is a fight between Suzuki's students and Kuro in the desert, which the reviewer for Manga-News describes as inappropriate. In the ninth volume, the reviewer for Manga News felt that Chieko and Goro steal the stage from the main characters, and that the tenth volume was unfocused.
