= Ryūsaku Chiziwa =

Japanese voice actor

Ryūsaku Chiziwa (千々和 竜策, Chiziwa Ryūsaku; born May 27, 1969) is a Japanese voice actor from Tokyo, Japan working for Artepro.

== Voice roles ==
- Aqua Kids
- Basilisk: The Kouga Ninja Scrolls
- Digimon Savers
- Elemental Gelade
- Gokusen
- Hellsing Ultimate - Old Tourist (Ep. 3)
- Le Chevalier D'Eon
- Planetarian: The Reverie of a Little Planet
- The Galaxy Railways
- Tokyo Majin Gakuen Kenpucho: Tou
- Yoshimune

=== Tokusatsu ===
- Kamen Rider Kiva - Rhinoceros Fangire (Ep. 13 - 14)
- Zyuden Sentai Kyoryuger - Beautiful Zoreamer (Ep. 38)

=== Dubbing ===
- The Big Bang Theory – Leonard Hofstadter (Johnny Galecki)
- Indiana Jones and the Temple of Doom (2009 WOWOW edition) – Kao Kan (Ric Young)
- Overheard – Johnny Leung (Sean Lau)
- Overheard 2 – Manson Lo Man-sang (Sean Lau)
