= The Galaxy Railways =

Japanese anime television series

- Cover of the DVD box

銀河鉄道物語 (Ginga Tetsudō Monogatari)
- Genre: Action, adventure, fantasy, drama, science fiction
- Created by: Leiji Matsumoto
- Anime television series
- Directed by: Yukio Nishimoto
- Produced by: Hiroshi Kon
- Written by: Hideki Sonoda
- Music by: Nozomi Aoki
- Studio: Planet Entertainment (Note: Production (制作).); Studio Kuma (Note: Animation production (アニメーション制作).); Ginga-ya (Note: Production assistance (制作協力).)
- Licensed by: NA: Funimation
- Original network: BS Fuji
- English network: US: Funimation Channel CoLours TV Select On Demand Crunchyroll Channel
- Original run: October 4, 2003 – April 4, 2004
- Episodes: 26
- Anime television series

II: Crossroads to Eternity
- Directed by: Tsuneo Tominaga
- Produced by: Hiroshi Kon
- Written by: Yasunori Yamada
- Music by: Nozomi Aoki
- Studio: Planet Entertainment; Studio Kuma
- Original network: CBC
- Original run: October 4, 2006 – March 28, 2007
- Episodes: 26
- Original video animation

A Letter from the Abandoned Planet
- Directed by: Hideaki Oba
- Produced by: Hiroshi Kon
- Written by: Yasuyuki Muto
- Music by: Nozomi Aoki
- Studio: Planet Entertainment; Ginga-ya (Note: seisaku kyou)
- Licensed by: NA: Discotek Media
- Released: January 19, 2007 – March 24, 2007
- Episodes: 5

The Galaxy Railways (銀河鉄道物語, Ginga Tetsudō Monogatari) is a Japanese anime television series produced by Leiji Matsumoto, creator of Galaxy Express 999, and is about flying trains set in the far reaches of outer space. It began airing on October 4, 2003. Funimation licensed the anime for release in the United States. It debuted on American TV in a syndicated Funimation Channel programming block airing on CoLours TV on Monday, June 19, 2006. The series has also aired on the linear Funimation Channel. Two sequels have been produced, both currently unlicensed in English regions.

An off take of the series called The Galaxy Railways: Faraway Angels (銀河鉄道物語 ～最果てのアンジェラ～) was released as a Drama CD in March 2009. The story follows the Mizar platoon and their adventures.

== Plot ==
=== The Galaxy Railways ===
The story takes place in an alternate future, where trains are capable of interplanetary travel. The fleet of the Galaxy Railways is protected by the Space Defence Force, or SDF, against intergalactic terrorists, meteor storms, and malicious alien life.

In the series, it seems that the Galaxy Railways serve as both an establishment and government presiding over a large sector of the galaxy. The railways are made up of a series of large rings that create energy shields to protect the trains that move between them, creating the tracks the trains follow. The railways are under the rule of the Supreme Commander but seem to be more actively guided by a lower-ranking official known as the Commander. The Galaxy Railways Headquarters presides over the SDF and the SPG (Space Panzer Grenadiers, an elite defense force) as well as all passenger operations.

At the beginning of the story, the main character, Manabu Yūki, has always had dreams of joining the SDF, following in the footsteps of his father and brother. Because both his brother and father died while serving in the SDF, his mother tries to stop Manabu from joining the SDF. Despite this, Manabu is determined to join and boards the train to Destiny Station to join the force. Manabu trains hard and despite conflicts with Captain Bulge, Bruce, and other characters, joins the Sirius Platoon that his father used to command.

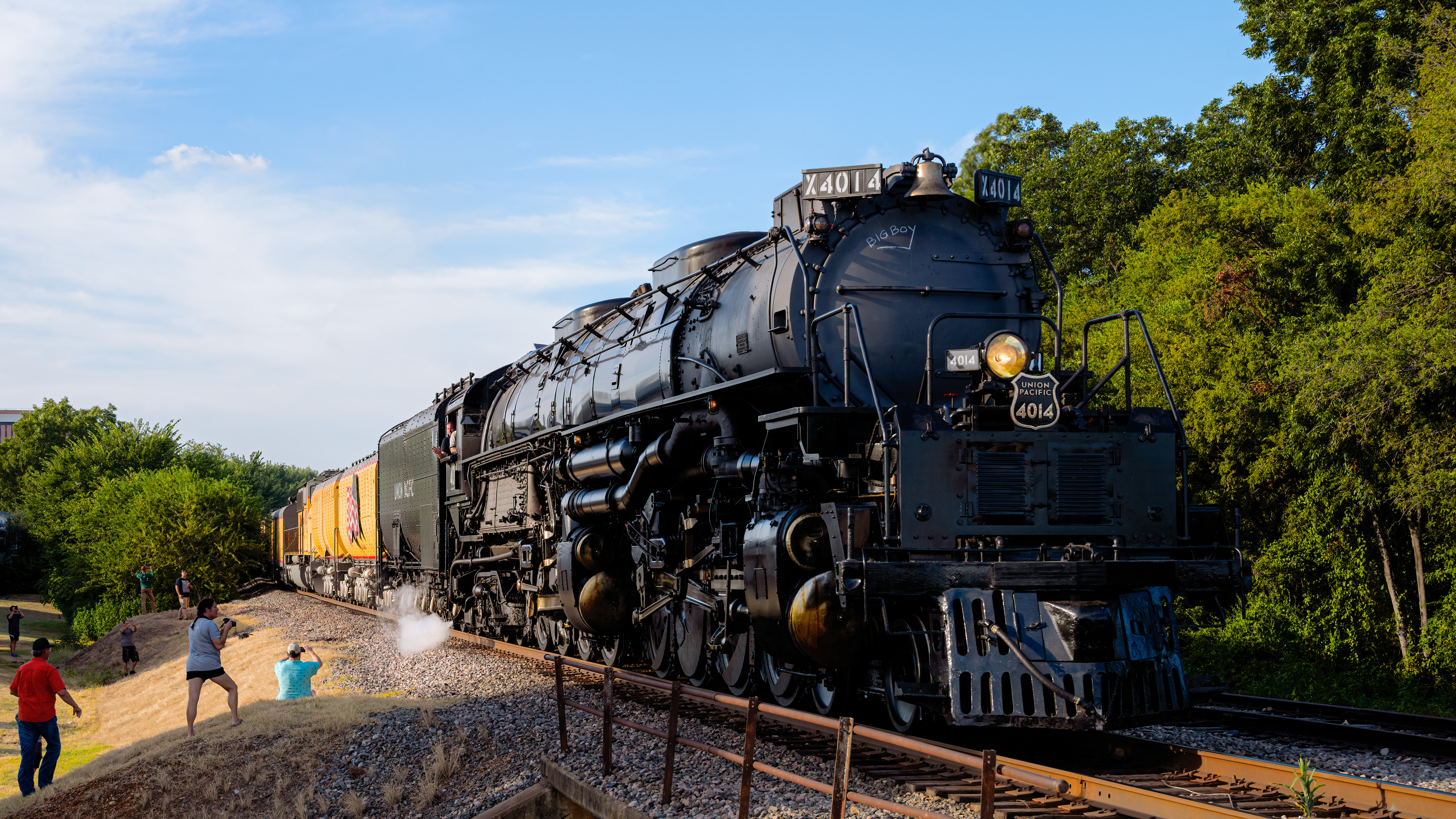
The Union Pacific Big Boy, which served as the basis for the Big One locomotive in the series.

The Sirius Platoon's train is headed up by a steam locomotive dubbed Big One. The locomotive itself is based on the Union Pacific Big Boy steam locomotives, built by the American Locomotive Company of Schenectady, New York. The Sirius Platoon is the primary focus of the Galaxy Railways, but the Spica and Vega platoons also make appearances and become more involved towards the end of the series.

=== A Letter from the Abandoned Planet ===
A 4-part OVA series The Galaxy Railways: A Letter from the Abandoned Planet (銀河鉄道物語 ～忘れられた時の惑星～, Ginga Tetsudō Monogatari ~Wasurerareta Toki no Wakusei~; Planet of Forgotten Time) was produced that bridges both seasons of the show (production on the OVA began before the sequel TV series, even though it was released later).

The Galaxy Express 999 crashes on the off-limits planet of Herise (ヒーライズ) and it's up to the SDF Sirius Platoon to assist.

=== Crossroads to Eternity ===
In 2006 a sequel series, The Galaxy Railways: Crossroads to Eternity (銀河鉄道物語 ～永遠への分岐点～, Ginga Tetsudō Monogatari ~Eien e no Bunkiten~) began broadcasting in Japan for a 26-episode run. Of those 26, only 24 episodes were broadcast on television, with the final two released only on DVD.

The series picks up after roughly one year had passed after the first season. Manabu is on his home planet Tabito, on vacation. Meanwhile, Sirius Platoon has an intern sitting in to observe and learn the ropes, Killian Black (the foster son of Mr. Conductor from Galaxy Express 999, as seen in "A Letter from the Abandoned Planet"). An express train fell into a dimensional fault line and became a runaway. The train reemerges into Tabito's orbit and is on a collision course with the planet at express speed. Manabu who caught wind of the situation "borrows" a maintenance locomotive to rescue the passengers, and also save his home planet from destruction. He then couples up to the runaway train before making his way to the lead locomotive, assuring the passenger of the situation along the way. Just as Big One arrives, after Killian had pinpointed where the missing train would reemerge, Manabu uncouples the locomotive from the train, so that the passenger cars could be safely secured. He then tries to stop the locomotive manually, but is unable to disable its autopilot system. Just as it is about to enter Tabito's atmosphere, Captain Bulge fires Big One's main cannons at the runaway locomotive, successfully deflecting its course, stopping it. After being rescued, unharmed, Manabu rejoins his crew and he returns to Planet Destiny. There is a new Platoon formed while Manabu was away, to replace Vega Platoon after they sacrificed themselves and their train, Iron Burger, during the Alfort invasion. They go by the name Cepheus Platoon, and it is led by Capitan Guy Lawrence, who served with Captain Bulge under Capitan Yuuki, Manabu's father and former captain of Big One. They seem uptight and serious and is partially teaming up with Sirius Platoon just once.

After several filler episodes, some developments take place in the series: 1. Manabu takes Killian under his wing, much like Bruce did with him in Season One. He feels that he should carry on Bruce's harsh training methods and attitude towards newbies, and seems to be very good at it. 2. A prototype SPG train, designed to be based on Big One is stolen by pirates who use it to ruin Sirius Platoon's name. After a heated showdown, they are obliterated by the Cosmo Matrix Cannon (as seen in episodes 13-14).

Then the main part of the story starts. During a rescue operation to pull a stranded train from a dimensional fault line, a small pod emerges from it. The pod is recovered by Big One. Inside is Frell, a little girl who says she is from another universe and needs to return to her home planet. She hears Manabu's last name and says she knew his father or at least heard his name discussed before. Finding this out, Big One Charges through the fault line, making it to the other universe. Once there, they start planet hopping using Big One's Off-Track Mode (not being anywhere near the Galaxy Railways, it would normally be impossible for a train to even move).

After making peace on several planets and helping out in different ways to the various inhabitants of them, Big One is sucked into "The Bottom of Gravity", a literal gravity pit. There they find SDF and Galaxy Railways Trains that have disappeared from their universe over the years. They also find various other crafts that have been missing. For some reason, the Platoon is not able to get Big One to move. During this time, Frell starts spending periods in the engine room (inside the boiler, where all the glowing dials and switches are). One time, as she is turning to leave, she feels a presence and asks who is there. Suddenly, all the glowing dials and switches light up and a voice says that it is the Independent Train Control System, type G8001. This is the voice of Big One. Frell has a conversation with Big One, and she learns that Big One will not move because the other trains have started to persuade him to stay in the pit and sleep peacefully, or die. Big One also says that he is not moving because he does not have a destination. After Frell convinces the rest of the Platoon that Big One does talk, they come into the engine room and give Big One some support, such as saying that after they take Frell to her planet, they will all return to Destiny together. Big One realizes that Sirius Platoon never gives up, even in impossible situations. He also realizes that he too is a member of Sirius Platoon. He asks other engines that have been repaired and coupled up to lend him their power, and they do. Big One with all the other engines makes it out of the pit, but just as they reach the top, the couplers break and the other engines fall back into the pit, while they are saying their farewells to Big One.

Finally, they make it to Frell's planet, Fatom. After speaking to the elders, they find out the horrible truth. After ramming Big One into an enemy ship when Manabu was a little boy, Wataru crash-landed in the destroyed Big One on Frell's planet. The people on Fatom do not remember Wataru himself, and they think that he is controlling the weapons that torment the planet. After fighting a ship and unmanned fighters on Fatom, Sirius Platoon goes back out into space to find what the locals call "The Demonic Machine". When they reach it, they find that it is the size of a planet. When they fight it, they see that it can repair itself. Suddenly, all the SDF trains emerge into view to help Big One fight the Demonic Machine. They realize that there is a thirty-second lag before the self-recovery, and they use this to give time for Big One to charge inside. They do, and Frell goes with Manabu to find his father. They find the original Demonic Machine (it had gathered other machines to be the size of a planet) and see that it has a Galaxy Railways ID number. He finds his father's cap in front of a hologram generator, and his father's spirit in holographic form appears. Wataru says hello to Manabu, and tells him what had happened. After crashing on Fatom, he made peace with the locals and all was well, but a few weeks after landing, the SDF's prototype top-secret Inter-universe tunnel malfunctioned and crashed on the planet, wiping out a critical part of the land. Wataru armed himself and attacked the tunneler, which had an A.I. built into it. It absorbed Wataru's body, melding his spirit into the machine. It then used his image as a puppet to speak to humans. It uses its weapon system to torment planets all over the alternate universe. He then tells Manabu to shoot him through the head and end all the madness. If he does, then the A.I. will be destroyed also. Reluctantly, he does so, takes his hat, and makes it out to Big One and through the dimensional tunnel made by a new tunneling machine found by the SDF just in time.

The ending shows Manabu and Louise returning to Tabito together and presenting his father's cap to his mother.

=== Continuity with other works ===
This series begins one year before the film Galaxy Express 999 which takes place in 2221 AD. The first episode concludes four years later in 2225. The rest of the series occurs in the year 2230. Galaxy Express 999 was noted for guest appearances by Captain Harlock, Queen Emeraldas and other connections such as Queen Millennia. The first Galaxy Railways season had no such crossovers and appearances by other Leijiverse characters were limited to subtle visual homages, although Manabu's brother, when accepted by the SDF, boards the Galaxy Express 999 to start his new assignment. Maetel and Tetsuro can both briefly be seen as silhouettes as well. For example, Captain Harlock appears as the Joker in a deck of cards. Queen Millennia appears on the head of the coin used for currency. Their status as actual existing characters in this continuity is not known, but Maetel, Tetsuro, and The Conductor from Galaxy Express 999 do appear in the later Galaxy Railways OVA.

Leiji Matsumoto stated in an interview included in the first DVD of the American release that Manabu Yuuki is the brother of female space pirate Kei Yūki, seen in the Captain Harlock TV series and Endless Odyssey OVA, though such a relationship has never been mentioned in the anime series and seems unlikely. In the latest volume of the Galaxy Express 999 manga, however, they are brother and sister.

== Themes ==
The narrator guides the viewers through the episodes with epilogues and prologues to each episode, introducing a specific idea in each one. There are, however, two overarching themes the prevail throughout the series.

Destiny and Fate: The series asks the age-old question of whether the choices are pre-determined, or whether the characters can forge their destiny. This evolves through each episode, starting with episode two, where Manabu has the chance to save his older brother from dying in the past. Despite his brother's attempt to evade his destiny to die, he is shot in the back - suggesting that fate and destiny prevail. In a later episode, "A Train Bound for Fate", Manabu meets an old friend who has gotten on the train believing that there is no point in fighting fate. He states that no matter what to do, the outcome has already been determined. The train is attacked and Manabu has to force his friend to defend himself against what he believes is his death. By the end of the episode, his friend finally believes Manabu and takes action for his life. Later on, the narrator suggests that he does not know whether or not there is such a thing as fate, but whether or not it exists, the people should still do the best. Near the end of the first season, Manabu finally declares that his destiny is his own to shape and is victorious.

Life and Death: From the very first episode, the series explores the ideas of life and death with the death of Manabu's father, and the death of his older brother. In the beginning of the series Manabu refuses to use a gun and does whatever he can to avoid killing people. Death is an extremely hard thing for Manabu to deal with, as seen in episodes 6 and 7 when a little girl dies in front of him. In episode 4, Manabu has to stop a man from chasing after the ghost of his love and convince him that he still has reason to live. Manabu's underlying belief seems to be that everyone is entitled to live, good or bad. It isn't until Manabu is forced to choose between the life of a crew mate and the life of a criminal in episode 10 that he realizes that sometimes, people give up the right to live.

== Musical themes ==
Season One: The Galaxy Railways

Intro

Title
Artist
Episodes
Ginga Tetsudo wa Harukanari
Isao Sasaki
1-26

Ending

Ginga no Hikari
Isao Sasaki
1-26

A Letter from the Abandoned Planet & Season Two: Crossroads to Eternity

Intro

Carry the Light
Jia-Jia
1-26

Ending

ALL OF US
Maki Goto
1-26

== Episodes ==
Below is the episode lists for each season.

=== Season 1 ===
Episode #	Title	Japanese air date (Fuji TV)	English air date (Funimation Channel)
1	"Sacrifice"	2003-10-04	2006-06-19
2	"Knot in Time"	2003-10-11	
3	"Wheel of Fate"	2003-10-18	
4	"Eternity"	2003-10-25	
5	"Hijacked"	2003-11-01	
6	"Reason to Live - 1"	2003-11-08	
7	"Reason to Live - 2"	2003-11-15	
8	"Engine Song"	2003-11-22	
9	"Memory Gallery"	2003-11-29	
10	"Crossroads"	2003-12-06	
11	"Forget Me Not"	2003-12-13	
12	"Twilight"	2003-12-20	
13	"Train Bound for Fate"	2004-01-10	
14	"Bond"	2004-01-17	
15	"Joint Forces"	2004-01-24	
16	"Comrade"	2004-01-31	
17	"Armored Goddess"	2004-02-07	
18	"Life and Death"	2004-02-14	
19	"Tranquility"	2004-02-21	
20	"Choice"	2004-02-28	
21	"The Revolt"	2004-03-06	
22	"The Merciless Wind"	2004-03-13	
23	"The Cruel Verdict"	2004-03-20	
24	"Blazing Galaxy"	2004-03-27	
25	"Echoes of Life"	2004-04-03	
26	"Eternal Hope"	2004-04-10	

=== Season 2 – Crossroads to Eternity ===
One of the most obvious changes was the uniform change from blue to black. Almost all flashbacks show everyone in Sirius Platoon wearing the new uniforms. It is unknown why the switch was made. Big One was also rebuilt, carrying smoke deflectors and a Streamlined-style front. There also seems to be almost no actual mention of Vega Platoon in the second season, except a 5-second clip of its being destroyed. The show's finale was not broadcast, instead, it was presented in the third DVD boxset of the series.

Episode no.	Title	Japanese air date (Fuji TV)	English air date (Funimation Channel)
1	"New Departure"	2006-10-04	
2	"Gap Between Calmness and Insanity"	2006-10-11	
3	"Flower Blooming in Space"	2006-10-18	
4	"Stardust Blues"	2006-10-25	
5	"Edge of the Abyss"	2006-11-01	
6	"Graduation"	2006-11-08	
7	"Blue Roses"	2006-11-15	
8	"Mission for Two"	2006-11-22	
9	"Road to Tomorrow"	2006-11-29	
10	"Abandoned Future"	2006-12-06	
11	"For Whose Pride"	2006-12-13	
12	"Wings of Soul"	2006-12-20	
13	"SDF, in a Dire Pinch—1"	2007-01-10	
14	"SDF, in a Dire Pinch—2"	2007-01-17	
15	"Momentary Happiness"	2007-01-24	
16	"Uninvited Castaway"	2007-01-31	
17	"Departure Towards the Unknown"	2007-02-07	
18	"The Successor of the Spear"	2007-02-14	
19	"Mist Calls"	2007-02-21	
20	"At the End of the Journey"	2007-02-28	
21	"Reunion"	2007-03-07	
22	Labyrinth Named Destiny"	2007-03-14	
23	"Through the Storm"	2007-03-21	
24	"The Eternal Vow"	2007-03-28	
25	"The Sirius Platoon Is in My Heart (Part One)"	Japanese DVD exclusive	
26	"The Sirius Platoon Is in My Heart (Part Two)"	Japanese DVD exclusive	

=== OVA – A Letter from the Abandoned Planet ===
Episode #	Japanese DVD release date
1	2007-01-24
2	2007-02-28
3	2007-03-28
4	2007-04-25

== U.S. release ==
Funimation licensed the anime for release in the United States. The first season debuted in a syndicated Funimation Channel programming block airing on CoLours TV on June 19, 2006.

Although Funimation did not get the license for the second season and the OVA, they surveyed its online fan base in 2009, and fans expressed interest in the localization of Galaxy Railways season 2 and the OVA.

== Reception ==
In a review of the first volume of the US release, Theron Martin at the Anime News Network praised the visuals of the series but stated that while the writing of the series was not bad, it did not seem fresh by modern standards and did not offer originality in the telling of its main story. He went on to state that reactions to the series would largely depend on the viewers' appreciation of Leiji Matsumoto's other work, giving it a B− rating overall. Writing for THEM Anime Reviews, Stig Høgset stated that there was little to complain about in the series, and was particularly complimentary of its art and animation. He also praised the series' characters, stating that they were a rich cast that was set up and put to work well.

== See also ==
- Galaxy Express 999 – the original manga series by Leiji Matsumoto.
