= List of Tenchi Muyo! characters =

Characters of Tenchi Muyo franchise

The following is a list of the major characters from the anime and manga series Tenchi Muyo! Ryo-Ohki and its spin-offs Tenchi Muyo! GXP, Tenchi Muyo! War on Geminar, Tenchi Universe, Tenchi in Tokyo, and Ai Tenchi Muyo!.

== Concept ==
Masaki Kajishima and Hiroki Hayashi, who both worked on the Bubblegum Crisis OVAs, cite the show as being the inspiration for Tenchi Muyo! Ryo-Ohki.

In an interview with AIC, Hayashi described Bubblegum Crisis as "[a] pretty gloomy anime. Serious fighting, complicated human relationships, and dark Mega Tokyo." Hayashi and Kajishima thought it would be fun to create some comedic episodes with ideas like the girls going to the hot springs, but these ideas were rejected by their sponsors. Hayashi explained that having a cast of several characters of one gender and a single one of the other gender was a trend at the time; he wondered what it would be like if Mackey (Sylia's brother) was a main character of a show, reversing the scenario in Bubblegum. This became the basis for the Bubblegum Crisis.

In designing Ryoko, Kajishima and Hayashi were inspired by the American sitcom I Dream of Jeannie and wanted to use her in their works. In the first episode, Tenchi opens the sealed cave, a reference to the Jeannie's bottle, and a "cute witch" jumps out. Hayashi said that Tenchi is "sort of" based on Mackey, and that after Tenchi and Ryoko, the rest of the girls were designed as original characters to balance the picture in the very early concepts of the series.

== Main characters ==
=== Tenchi Masaki ===
Tenchi Masaki Jurai
- Tenchi Muyo character
- Created by: Masaki Kajishima
- Voiced by: Japanese: Masami Kikuchi; English: Matt K. Miller

In-universe information
- Relatives: Nobuyuki Masaki (father); Kiyone Masaki (mother, deceased); Achika Masaki (mother, Tenchi Muyo in Love film, deceased); Tennyo Masaki (sister, Ryo-Ohki); Kenshi Masaki (half-brother, War); Katsuhito Masaki (grandfather (a.k.a. Masaki Yosho Jurai))

Tenchi Masaki (柾木 天地, Masaki Tenchi) is the title character of the Tenchi Muyo! series. Tenchi's name means "Heaven and Earth." It is the same as "Tenchi" in the Shinto creation myth detailed within the Kojiki, which contains some of Japan's oldest myths and legends.

==== Tenchi Muyo! Ryo-Ohki ====
In the OVA-based continuities, Tenchi is the first prince of Jurai, grandson of a Juraian prince named Yosho, and of an Airaian priestess named Airi. He obtains of a "'Master Key" called "Tenchi", also known as the Tenchi Sword (Tenchi-ken), that can form a lightsaber-like blade and later receives a special ring from Tsunami that can create a Juraian battle suit for him and acts as a "Guardian System" which protects him. Tenchi also has the innate ability to create kou-ou-yoku ("Light Hawk Wings") (believed to be the only non-ship entity able to do so until encountering Z in OVA 3), and the ill-defined ability of Material-Energy Conversion. Tenchi initially lives in the city with his father to attend school and visits his grandfather's shrine every summer, where he trains to become a Shinto priest and learn his family's special style of swordsmanship (which happens to be particular to members of Jurai's Royal Family). The house is permanently relocated next to the shrine after a battle between Ryoko and Ayeka, and Tenchi lives in the house with the girls while refusing to get intimate with them. Tenchi no longer attends school, after the school was decimated during the encounter with Ryoko in OVA 1 (but rebuilt as of OVA 3).

Tenchi suffers a great deal of stress as he tries his hardest to be a gentleman while most of the women within the household will take every opportunity to display their attraction for him. In the third OVA series Tenchi is discovered to be engaged to Noike (step-aunt of Ayeka and Sasami). The arrangement was done by Tenchi's great-great-grandmother, known better as the "Devil Princess of Jurai", Seto Kamiki Jurai. Tenchi also found out around this time that he has an 80-year-old sister named Tennyo Masaki, who looks like his late mother, Kiyone. Tenchi learned from his grandfather, Katsuhito, that since Earth is a developing civilization, the Masaki clan must keep their true presence hidden since they do not age at the same rate as Earthlings, and those who are born into the Masaki family are also kept from these secrets until they reach adulthood. After a climactic battle between the three Goddesses, the truth behind everything that has happened was linked to the three. They decided to change the timeline in order to repair the damage that they have done, and Tenchi, in his altered timeline, doesn't get to meet Noike. However, Noike, along with Fuku, traveled into the past and altered the message Mihoshi was to send to her family (the message was originally altered by Z) so that she would meet Tenchi.

Tenchi is one of the most powerful characters in the series, but is too young and immature to have full control over his Light Hawk Wings and other abilities. He is a competent swordsman and martial artist capable of superhuman feats thanks to his Juraian blood, but has only displayed his abilities during dire situations, such as during his duel with Kagato, his escape from a black hole, and his final confrontation with Z. The full extent of Tenchi's powers is limitless, as he was stated outright by the Choushin to be as powerful as them, the same beings who created all of existence and transcend space and time. When he started to manifest his higher self, it almost instantly destroyed all of existence, forcing the Goddesses and his own future self to intervene and prevent a catastrophe (in the new "altered" timeline, when Noike secretly fired the Choubimaru's cannon to collide with the Earth, Tenchi projects his Light Hawk Wings to stop it, a total of six wings, rather than the usual 3 wings he had before prior to the event.)

Tenchi is the human embodiment of a dimensionally-boundless entity, as powerful compared to the three hyper-dimensional Goddesses as they are to ordinary beings. Airi notes in GXP (the same continuity) that Tenchi has several powers they haven't discovered yet, namely instantaneous teleportation (immediately teleported off of the planet when Z destroyed a large amount of Earth), and supernatural speed (kept up with Seina in a foot race, despite Seina having drastic body enhancements and going downhill on a bicycle). Tenchi's higher self is the supreme being of the Tenchi Muyo continuity and all its parallel universes, unfathomably transcends infinity by 3-dimensional standards, and has been stated to be above, outside, and beyond even the hyper-dimension that the Choushin occupy. It easily put a stop to Tenchi almost destroying all of existence and effortlessly negated the Counter-Actor, the embodiment of the total sum of the counterforce to the Choushins' experiments in the multiverse over trillions of years.

Although Tenchi is not bound to a royal tree, he is still considered a contender for the Jurai throne, which usually determined by being a part of one of the four royal families; this is due to both to his status as a successor to First Prince Yosho (who was a contender due to his presence in the 1st Generation Royal Tree) and his singular ability among the Jurai to create Lighthawk Wings on his own. However, Tenchi displays little interest in Jurai politics.

In the Kajishima Onsens, a series of doujinshi by the creator of Tenchi Muyo!, Masaki Kajishima, it is revealed that Tenchi has multiple children with various female characters, most notably with Ryoko; their daughter has briefly appeared in a picture with her half-sister, Ryo-ohki's daughter. In one particular doujinshi, Tenchi Muyo -if-, a pregnant Ryoko, Ayeka, and Ryo-ohki are shown. Within its short story, Ayeka and Ryoko have developed a sisterly bond, caring for each other's child as their own and are shown to be very protective of their children upon discovering their daughters' infatuation with Seina's son. In a separate doujin, Tenchi is shown to have a son with a striking resemblance to Washu, although the boy's mother is never explicitly revealed.

==== Tenchi Muyo! GXP ====
GXP is a spinoff continuation following the 3rd OVA series, but Tenchi himself does not play a prominent role in this series. The GP tried to recruit Tenchi, but they got Seina instead. Tenchi showed no interest in joining the GP. He only appears in a speaking role in Episode 17, wherein his old friend Seina Yamada comes to his house to see Washu Hakubi to talk about the cabit Fuku that she had given him. During his visit Tenchi is able to cook a meal for Seina, however, Seina is on call and has to be retrieved before he has a chance to eat Tenchi's cooked meal. Tenchi also showed that he can move incredibly fast during a race with Seina, since he can keep up with him despite Seina having drastic body enhancements and going downhill on a bicycle. Tenchi, as well as the other girls, also appear in a brief cameo in Episode 26 in which they attend Seina's wedding.

==== Tenchi Universe ====
In the first TV series, Tenchi Universe, Tenchi is similar in personality to the Tenchi of the OVA, but has no powers beyond the ability to use Tenchi-ken (and, apparently, the blessing of his royal ancestors should he decide to take Jurai's throne). The Tenchi sword is just a weapon and is not a Master Key; there are no intelligent Royal Trees in the TV series. Tenchi does attend school, but it is a long commute for him because he lives at his family's shrine in the mountains. After finding out about his grandfather's true identity and defeating Kagato, Tenchi chose to turn down the Jurai throne and head back to Earth, after realizing that like his grandfather before him he wants to live a simple life without much responsibility. Although Tenchi was bored with living on Earth again without the girls around, he is surprised when they return and Ryoko reminds Tenchi that although a carnival would eventually leave, it would always come back again.

==== Tenchi in Tokyo ====
In the second TV series, Tenchi in Tokyo, Tenchi's personality and background are different. He has no connections to Jurai and his sword is created from seven gems inherited from his late mother. Ryoko separated the gems to prevent the sword from being used against her again. Each of the six girls took one of the gems as a keepsake. Tenchi moved to Tokyo to train as a Shinto priest under a friend of his grandfather's. Eventually, Tenchi got tired of the girls' frequent visits and ordered them never to disturb him again.

At the end of the series, Tenchi finds out that his family are the Planet Guardians whose job is to protect the planet from evil forces when the need arises. Although it was hard for Tenchi after learning about Sakuya Kumashiro's true identity, Tenchi was able to unite the gems together and chose to confront Yugi alone feeling that he was partly responsible for what happened. With some help from Ryoko, Ayeka, Mihoshi, and Kiyone, Tenchi caught up to Yugi and chose to spare her and give her a second chance. Tenchi explained she should have come to the Masaki Shrine in the first place and become friends with him and the others rather than to wallow away in loneliness. After the final battle, Tenchi moved back to the Masaki shrine.

==== Magical Girl Pretty Sammy ====
In the Magical Girl Pretty Sammy OVA series, Tenchi Kawai (河合 天地, Kawai Tenchi) (as he is known in the show) is Sasami's older brother and a high school student. He is the center of attention for his classmates, Ryoko Orikasa and Ayeka Takada, to the point where they would fight each other for his affections. When Ryoko and Ayeka were transformed by Pixy Misa into Love Love Monsters, they began to fight over him for their affections, until Pretty Sammy intervened. When Pretty Sammy was having trouble against the Ryoko and Ayeka Love Love Monsters, Tenchi was able to get through to them by apologizing for not choosing between them. Even after Sammy turned them back to normal Tenchi still had to deal with Ryoko and Ayeka's bickering as he doesn't understand true love yet.

In Magical Project S (Pretty Samy TV), he only appears in Episode 12 and is known as Tenchi Masaki, a director of the Blue Sky Cool Rangers, a Super Sentai-style TV series. Tenchi was having problems with the production as he was starting out as a director, until Sasami decided to help by guest starring on a Cool Rangers episode as Pretty Sammy. This helped save his career. Sasami developed a crush on him, but was heartbroken, after she learned that Tenchi already has a girlfriend, and that he was moving away when he was given a job offer as a theatrical director.

=== Ryoko Hakubi ===
Ryoko Hakubi
- Tenchi Muyo! character
- Created by: Masaki Kajishima
- Voiced by: Japanese: Ai Orikasa; English: Petrea Burchard (Ryo-Ohki 1, 2, Universe, Tokyo, Ai, films); Mona Marshall (Ryo-Ohki 3, GXP)

In-universe information
- Species: Synthetic composite being: Goddess/Synthezoid
- Relatives: Washu Hakubi (creator)

Ryoko (魎呼, Ryōko) is a key character in the various Tenchi Muyo! anime series by AIC. While details of her character differ between the various series, Ryoko is typically shown as an attractive, semi-reformed powerful space pirate who is madly in love with the series main character, Tenchi Masaki. In the various series, Ryoko is portrayed as being impulsive, hedonistic (with a penchant for sake), poor-mannered, often immodest, recklessly violent, and hot-tempered although she sometimes reveals her more emotional and vulnerable side.

In the anime, Ryoko universally holds an intense rivalry with the character Ayeka, who also fights for Tenchi's affections. Often the conflict between the two comes out of their decidedly different personalities, with Ryoko being the tomboyish troublemaker and Ayeka being the well-mannered, but often snooty aristocrat. The level of the rivalry can vary between being equitable to a pair of bickering siblings to an all-out feud.

While the name Ryoko is a common feminine given name in Japan, in this instance it is written with very uncommon kanji. Ryoko's name can be translated as "bringer of demons" and is stated as meaning "The Devil Caller" in the OVA series.

OVA

Ryoko was created by Washu, using one of Washu's egg cells as a base, so she is indirectly (raised in a tube with no contact with Washu) Washu's daughter. Washu's DNA was combined with that of amorphous creatures called the Masu to create Ryoko. She has three red gems that are the source of her full energy, which also came from Washu when she imbued them with her godly powers in her early life.

As a character, Ryoko is very emotional. She easily gets upset, and is short tempered, especially around Ayeka. But she's deeply in love with Tenchi, though not fully admitting how deeply until Episodes 5 & 6, when she tells Ayeka how she first met Tenchi, and later when she offers up her own life in place of his. While she was trapped in the cave, she was able to create an astral body and venture to the entrance of the cave. She watched Tenchi grow up over the years, and she wished more than anything to be with him and hoped that she and Tenchi would play together. It was also implied that Tenchi could sense Ryoko's presence even though he could not see her. This could quite possibly explain the boy's fascination with the cave. However, the way she introduced herself to him was terribly frightening to Tenchi, so he distanced himself from her for a long time. Also, when Washu is first introduced she tells Ryoko that she knows how she (Ryoko) feels about Tenchi and says that Ryoko wants to do "this and that" with Tenchi.

Ryoko also has a bit of an ambiguous relation with Washu, her mother. When Washu first appears, she critiques her daughter's sex appeal and asks Ryoko to refer to her as "mommy". As the series progresses, she starts to fear Washu, especially when Washu starts doing some of her experiments on an unwilling Ryoko. In fact, Ryoko becomes slightly cautious whenever Washu is looking at her with a mischievous smile and intimidating eyes.

Ryoko, when captured and electrocuted by Ayeka in Episode 2, seems to enjoy it until the point when Ayeka uses excruciating force when Ryoko was clearly in pain. Ayeka calls her a masochist, and Ryoko says that she was more of a sadist. Judging by the fact that her ship Ryo-Ohki destroyed twenty-eight planets and sixty-nine colonies when in Kagato's service, and by some of her taunts in the fight with Tenchi, she might not have been joking. Ryoko is also sometimes rather childlike, and can be a bit gullible. Since most of her life was spent either enslaved by Kagato, or sealed inside a cave, she does not have much of a range of experiences. She is also extremely sensitive about her age, being brought to tears when Ayeka called her a "mummy."

Tenchi Universe

In this series, Ryoko is once again a space pirate, but she is not a slave to anybody. She was introduced to Tenchi by crash-landing on Earth during a dogfight with Mihoshi. Tenchi found her and it was almost love at first sight (for her, of course). We have no idea who her parents are or what her origins are; those are never revealed.

Ryoko can still summon an energy sword and shoot ki blasts, she can also fly, teleport, and make copies of herself, but she can no longer summon demons. Gems can still be glimpsed on her wrists, however, there is no mention of them being her power source. Ryoko is generally less powerful than in the OVA, as the bounty hunter Nagi (who has no superhuman powers at all) is able to fight her on at least equal terms.

Again, she's very emotional and brash, but not as much as in the OVA, and enjoys doing things to make Ayeka mad, which includes flirting with Tenchi. By the end of the series, however, her love for Tenchi has become very powerful — to the point that she nearly dies for him.

In this series, Ryoko still has Ryo-Ohki, her pet (or partner-in-crime) cabbit (cat/rabbit animal), which can transform into a well-armed spaceship. She also has an arch-rival, Nagi, who has her own cabbit, a male named Ken-Ohki. Ryo-Ohki and Ken-Ohki love each other, which complicates the lives of their mistresses.

When Kagato, under the name Yosho, assumes the throne of Jurai and has her, Ayeka and Sasami arrested, it is Ryoko who (correctly) guesses there was a coup on Jurai while Washu on the other hand was stumped. Later, Ryoko (again correctly) surmises that the "Yosho" who has taken the throne is a fake.

In the end, Tenchi is seen heading off for school and daydreaming about the missing Ryoko; then, to his surprise and delight, the real Ryoko returns.

It is inferred that Ryoko was also imprisoned for 700 years in this series during a scene between Ryoko and Ayeka where Ayeka exclaims to Ryoko "Well if your case goes to trial you won't get away with a mere 700 years of imprisonment this time."

Tenchi in Tokyo

Once again, Ryoko is a space pirate in this series. She and Washu were in the process of running away with the Jurai Lightstone, which consequently brings everybody to Tenchi's planet all at once. She pilots a pink Sōja, which looks identical to OVA Kagato's ship, except for its color.

Her physical appearance is considerably different in comparison with the other series due to the artwork, which made her look more tomboyish than she used to be. Her attitude is also very different: she's more violent and screams a lot more, so many things get blown up around her.

Ryoko's obsession over Tenchi is still there, but that's basically the only characteristic that remains consistent throughout every series. However, it develops to a greater extent in this series after she goes on a date with Tenchi, and later sees him with Sakuya. Her hurt feelings for Tenchi made her even abandon the group after she sees him and Sakuya kiss.

She still retains the ability to summon an energy sword and fire energy blasts, but Ryo-Ohki doesn't belong to her. Also she cannot survive without oxygen unlike the previous series.

Ryoko falls in love with Tenchi after a major battle between her and everybody else. Unfortunately, she was severely injured, but Tenchi remained by her bedside, taking care of her, and because nobody had done that for her before, it sparked her love for him there.

Pretty Sammy

Ryoko appears in both Pretty Sammy series in very different roles. In the OVA series, Ryoko appears as a schoolgirl, Ryoko Orikasa (折笠 魎呼, Orikasa Ryōko) (she was given the last name of her Japanese voice actress, Ai Orikasa), a yankii (a Japanese term for a juvenile delinquent). She and Ayeka constantly bicker over Tenchi Kawai's affections. Ryoko is obsessed with Tenchi, to the point where she even hides out inside his bedroom for one night, and even kidnaps him and carries him off against his will. Ryoko was briefly transformed with Ayeka into one of Pixy Misa's Love-Love Monsters in the first episode and became more obsessive over Tenchi, until Tenchi was able to get through to Ryoko, enabling Pretty Sammy to return her to normal. But even after that Ryoko hadn't changed.

In the Pretty Sammy TV series (Magical Project S), Ryoko appears in the last few episodes starting with episode 23 as Oryo... or "Overly Splendid" Oryo (素晴らしすぎるお魎, Subarashi Sugiru Oryō), bodyguard to Queen Tsunami of Jurai helm. In contrast to Ryoko's usual characterization, Oryo is a dignified and honorable warrior, ready to lay down her life for Tsunami. Her appearance and powers remain roughly the same, except that Oryo has normal human ears. She fights alongside Pretty Sammy and Pixy Misa against Romio, the would-be usurper. Fittingly, the name Oryo can be read "most honorable demon." In her first appearance, she disguised herself as "Cool Red," a character from the series Blue Sky Cool Rangers (a spoof of Japan's live-action Super Sentai series) and easily destroyed Love-Me Eimy's Lovely Monsters Right and Left, after Pretty Sammy had destroyed the antenna that Romio was using to control Eimi.

=== Ayeka Masaki Jurai ===
Ayeka Masaki Jurai
- Tenchi Muyo! character
- Created by: Masaki Kajishima
- Voiced by: Japanese: Yumi Takada; Haruhi Nanao (Ai, Ryo-Ohki 4); English: Jennifer Darling; Reba West (GXP); Cherami Leigh (Ai)

In-universe information
- Species: Juraian
- Title: First Princess of Jurai
- Relatives: Azusa Masaki Jurai (father); Misaki Kamiki Jurai (mother); Funaho Jurai (stepmother, Ryo-Ohki); Yosho Masaki Jurai (half-brother); Sasami Masaki Jurai (sister)
- Royal Tree: Ryu-Oh (2nd Gen)

Ayeka Masaki Jurai (柾木 阿重霞 樹雷, Masaki Aeka Jurai) is a key character in the various Tenchi Muyo! anime series by AIC. While details of her character differ between the various series, Ayeka is typically shown as the beautiful first princess of the planet Jurai who has fallen in love with the title character, Tenchi Masaki. Ayeka is portrayed as being modest, well mannered, traditional, and aristocratic, but can also be snobbish (her proper accent is evidence of her aristocratic upbringing). She can also be very fierce when she feels that anyone or anything she cares for is in danger, such as Tenchi or her younger sister Sasami, of whom she is very protective.

Ayeka is a rival of Ryoko for Tenchi's affections. Often the conflict between the two comes out of their decidedly different personalities and backgrounds, with Ryoko being more blunt, open and sexual in her attempts to gain Tenchi's love. The level of the rivalry can vary between being equatable to a pair of bickering siblings to an all-out feud. Ryoko's teasing and efforts often bring out some of Ayeka's worse aspects. However, there are times when Ayeka puts aside her rivalry whenever Tenchi is in danger, such as the battle with Kagato.

The romanization of her name in the English productions is "Ayeka" instead of "Aeka" to clarify its pronunciation for Western viewers (ah-eh-ka). Her name is believed to be derived from aekanaru, meaning "frail" or "delicate," reflecting her usual outward demeanor. An old reading of aeka is "willowy," or "requiring the assistance of a man." The tree is referenced in the "soul of the ship," and further connects to "spring" and the "awakening of sexual desire." In Japanese mythology, the willow tree is known as a "demon repeller," which represents her relationship with Ryoko.

Ayeka does not have Ryoko's level of power but is still quite capable in dueling most opponents, including Kagato. She is more powerful than Tenchi in his typical state, but once transformed his Juraian powers exceed hers.

Tenchi Muyo! Ryo-Ohki

Ayeka is the First Princess of Jurai's royal family. During this series, she was on a search for her missing brother, Yosho (she and Sasami are Tenchi's great-aunts). When her search led her to Earth, she did not find her brother or his ship, but did find Ryoko. Ayeka's apparent age is 20, but her true age is uncertain. It is known, however, that she was in a state of suspended animation for over 700 years when she and Sasami arrived on Earth. Her rivalry with Ryoko started well before the two met Tenchi; Ryoko and Ryo-ohki attacked Jurai, nearly killed Sasami (unintentionally), caused extensive damage and led Yosho, her brother and fiancée, to leave the planet in pursuit of the criminal. As a result, at the start of Tenchi Muyo!, she hates everything about Ryoko and considers her a monster.

Ayeka possesses various superhuman powers: she can fire energy blasts, summon a very powerful forcefield, has the ability to summon guardians that also have various abilities, such as possessing arc electricity, and capturing spaceships. She also has the ability to fly at very high speeds and possesses superhuman strength. For the most part, Ayeka is shy, demure and proper, but can become just as violent as Ryoko. When her temper is roused, Ayeka becomes very loud and aggressive, without regard for current conditions. However, she only resorts to physical aggression with Ryoko, and even these fights have diminished over time. Ayeka's spaceship is named Ryu-Oh. Unfortunately, it is damaged in a crash landing on Earth after an escape attempt by Ryoko. It did begin to regenerate, but was blown away by Kagato's ship, Sōja. However, due to help from Tsunami, Ayeka received a seed that would grow into a new Ryu-Oh.

Ryu-Oh has the ability to produce three kō-ō-yoku ("light-hawk-wings"). Ayeka had bonded with the ship shortly before Ryoko and Ryo-ohki attacked the Juraian castle, Tenju. Despite warnings made by the castle's attendants, 14-year-old Ayeka launched the young, underdeveloped ship to fend Ryoko's attacks. According to the True Tenchi Novels, "Ayeka had just finished the selection ceremony and did not have the key to help her connect with Ryu-oh. Also her ship had just equipped, thus was not fully synchronized with the external armor, so Ayeka and Ryu-oh could not fully control the power of the Royal tree. But Ayeka did not give up and continued the battle. However, she could not help the situation just by defending herself. It was only by virtue of the second generation Royal tree's power that she could hold off the attack, and it was also because Ryo-ohki and Ryoko were just teasing her and not fighting with full power." Ayeka was also able to use the light-hawk-wings to attack (though their purpose is for defense) and was able to hit Ryo-ohki, which no other ship could do. This feat is noted by Noike when she speaks to Tenchi in OVA 3.

Tenchi Universe

Ayeka is still a princess of Jurai in this series. As shy and demure as before, she seems to fall in love with Tenchi on the very first day she meets him. Ayeka was drawn to Earth by Mihoshi's distress signal, but once again, she finds Ryoko there as well and a massive fight eventually occurs. Here, the rivalry with Ryoko started back during their childhood, which was shown through flashbacks, with both Ayeka and Ryoko blaming each other for their problems. Again, Ayeka has a ship, Ryu-Oh, which crash lands on Earth; however, it becomes incapable of flying when it begins to regenerate, taking root to the wreckage of her old ship. Ayeka is a relatively minor member of the Jurai family, not the daughter of the Emperor as in the OVA. Still, after being kidnapped by Kagato and released by Tenchi, she returns to Jurai because she must remain with the Imperial Family from then on; but as the series concludes, Ayeka chooses to run away from home and rejoin Tenchi on Earth.

Tenchi in Tokyo

In Tenchi in Tokyo, Ayeka is once again a princess of Jurai. She teams up with the Galaxy Police to capture the space pirate Ryoko and scientist Washu, who stole the Jurai Light Stone. Ayeka's powers are still similar to the other two series, except we never see her fling energy blasts. Instead, she activates her forcefield on many occasions. Her Guardians, Azaka and Kamidake, take on a more combative role instead. After they crash-land onto Earth, Ayeka fights Ryoko, who turns the tide of the battle in her favor by absorbing the light stone herself; it is not until Tenchi's intervention that Ayeka is saved. She is the pilot of the Ayesa (as shown in Pioneer's subtitles), which is identical to her Ryu-Oh.

Instead of being completely shy and demure, she's similar to Ryoko in terms of explosive emotions. She's a lot more gullible than in the other series and is occasionally ditzy. On the other hand, unlike Ryoko, she does somewhat accept that Tenchi may prefer Sakuya Kumashiro to herself and others, as she confesses to a woman named Masayo whom she and Sasami aided once. Unlike Ryoko, also, she decides to stay on Earth; she aids Washu with her research about Yugi (she's the one who discovers Yugi's background) and attempts to protect Sasami and the Masaki household, ending up seriously injured by Matori. Ayeka is the first to notice that she and the others are being unwillingly separated by Tenchi, which greatly worries her.

Pretty Sammy

In the Pretty Sammy OAV series, Ayeka Takada (高田 阿重霞, Takada Aeka) (she was given the last name of her voice actress Yumi Takada) is from a rich family, is the class president and is skilled in martial arts. She has a crush on Tenchi Kawai. Ayeka sends her three female servants, Yuri, Yuka, and Yuma, to spy on Ryoko, who also has a crush on Tenchi. Ayeka is briefly transformed with Ryoko into a Love-Love Monster by Pixy Misa, and becomes more obsessive towards Tenchi until his feelings get through to Ayeka, enabling Pretty Sammy to restore Ayeka to her normal condition. But even after that, Ayeka's rivalry towards Ryoko over Tenchi's affections still continue.

In Magical Project S (Pretty Sammy TV), Ayeka is known as Romio (露美御, Romio), the third candidate to be the queen of Juraihelm. After she is not selected in the first episode, Romio disappears from the scene for a time, and later appears before Ramia to help her become queen after Pretty Sammy had restored the balance between Earth and Juraihelm, with Tsunami about to be crowned queen. Much to Rumiya's protests, Ramia accepted Romio's offer and Romio kidnaps Eimi Date (Sasami's classmate) and turns her into her own magical girl, "Love-Me Eimy", for her plan to drain Juraihelm and earth of all magic.

When that fails, Romio revealed her true self to Ramia and attempts to drain Jurai helm's magic with her NT System and use the stolen magic power to send earth into the sun. Its turns out that Romio was once a magical girl, but was unable to fix the balance between earth and Jurai helm, and since then she has felt the earth is evil and wants to destroy it. Romio's plan is stopped by the combined might of Pretty Sammy, Pixy Misa, Ryo-Ohki, and Rumiya with the assistance of Professor Washu, who develops her own NT System. After her NT System is destroyed, Romio is carried off into the distance by an angry Ramia. At the end of the series, despite her defeat, Romio hasn't given up and is now leading the Martians against Earth, as Pretty Sammy and Pixy Misa move in to stop her.

=== Sasami Masaki Jurai ===
Sasami Masaki Jurai
- Tenchi Muyo! character
- Voiced by: Japanese: Chisa Yokoyama; English: Sherry Lynn; Renee Emerson (GXP)

In-universe information
- Species: Juraian/Choushin (by assimilation with Tsunami)
- Title: Second Princess of Jurai
- Relatives: Azusa Masaki Jurai (father); Misaki Kamiki Jurai (mother); Funaho Jurai (stepmother, Ryo-Ohki); Yosho Masaki Jurai (half-brother); Ayeka Masaki Jurai (sister)
- Royal Tree: Tsunami (Prime tree)

Sasami Masaki Jurai (柾木 砂沙美 樹雷, Masaki Sasami Jurai) is a fictional character in the anime series, Tenchi Muyo! and its various spin-offs.

Sasami has appeared in every Tenchi Muyo! series, including several based around her as the central protagonist. In almost every incarnation her personality, background, primary outfits, relationships and abilities change. In some incarnations her art style is altered more than others, though her basic coloring and structure remaining the same.

Personality and series role In most series, Sasami is the younger sister of Ayeka and so is also a princess of Jurai. Within the family group Sasami usually takes on the dual role of younger sister/mother. She may be the most responsible of the group and takes care of all the cooking duties. She has a rarely seen mischievous streak within her however, and takes great delight in fooling the older girls. She has teal-colored hair tied in long pigtails with melon pink eyes (though, throughout most of the original OAV and the TV series (called 'Tenchi Universe'), Sasami had blue hair).

Sasami has a huge fanbase following across the globe and is the inspiration for what VIZ editor Carl Gustav Horn called 'The Sasami Effect', in that any young cute girl within a cast of characters will inevitably become the most popular. Possible examples of this include the Sailor Moon character, Chibiusa, Takamachi Nanoha of Triangle Heart, plus many other "young" female characters in Japanese, French, and American series.

Sasami's personality is more mature in the OVA than in the other continuities, and more aggressive in the second TV and the Pretty Sammy spin offs.

OVA Tenchi Muyo! Ryo-Ohki In the original series, Sasami and her sister Ayeka are the daughters of Emperor Masaki Azusa Jurai and the second of his two wives, second Empress Misaki Masaki Jurai. On her mother's side, Sasami's grandmother is Seto Kamiki Jurai and her grandfather is Utsutsumi Kamiki; on her father's side, Sasami's grandmother is Masaki Amame of Jurai and her grandfather is Yotsuga Kazuki. Sasami has a half-brother called Yosho Masaki Jurai – son of Emperor Azusa and his first wife, Funaho. Shortly into the series, Sasami and Ayeka take to living on Earth with Tenchi's family (Tenchi, his father Nobuyuki, and his mother's father Yosho, now named Katsuhito Masaki), along with the catlike creature Ryo-Ohki and three other women staying in the house. Sasami arrived on Earth by 'accident', stowing away on her sisters ship when she went looking for Yosho. She quickly became close friends with Ryo-Ohki and even Ryoko, despite that Ryoko held a blade to Sasami's throat almost as soon as they met.

Sasami holds a dark secret within her past. Seven hundred years ago, during Ryoko's attack on Jurai, Sasami was playing around in the Royal Arboretum and took a very dangerous fall, and as a result was mortally injured, and she believed that she died that day, that she was now a copy of the 'real' Sasami. The truth is that Sasami survived her injuries when Tsunami-kami-sama, in the form of Tsunami-no-ki, assimilated her. Tsunami-no-ki absorbed and re-created Sasami's body in order to heal her... and merged her spirit with Sasami's. In effect, they are now one being with two souls, and as they grow older their spirits will merge. This may account for her personality in this series. This also grants Sasami several powers that she does not possess in any other series. She now commands the most powerful ship in existence – Tsunami-fune – and can summon it from sub-space at will. Through her link to Tsunami-kami-sama she is linked to every Juraian Ship and their owners, and can sense their location and status. She also has precognitive abilities, but unfortunately these manifest as horrible, disturbing and sometimes even bloody nightmares.

Sasami hid her secret from those around her – including herself – because her greatest fear was that she would be rejected by those she loved. When it was finally revealed, though, Ayeka said she did not care about it and still loved Sasami just the way she was; Tenchi, Yosho and the other girls also accepted the fact.

It should also be noted that, if needed, Sasami is an accomplished combatant, most likely taught by her mother, who is the Supreme Commander of the Royal Bodyguard, and enhanced by the link with Tsunami-no-ki, easily defeating Mashisu Makibi, who was a trained Galaxy Police officer. One of the cherry-like hair bands she wears is capable of becoming a battle staff.

The OVA also contains the Mihoshi Special, In this one-off episode – written as a 'pilot' for both Tenchi Universe and Pretty Sammy – Sasami appears as herself, possibly her OVA version, but in the story told her name and image is used for the role of a Galaxy Police cadet, and has a secret identity as Pretty Sammy, along with her pet Ryo-Ohki. She is also known as the best tea maker in the GXP.

Television and Film Tenchi Universe In the first TV series Sasami is still Ayeka's sister and princess of Jurai, but there is no mention of her parents, and Yosho (along with his grandson Tenchi) appears to be only a distant relative. Tsunami does not appear in this series, so Sasami has no alter-ego (other than Pretty Sammy). Sasami is still an accomplished cook. She has a much more happy, innocent outlook on life and does not use any special powers. She does – or did – own her own ship, but it was soon destroyed, stranding her on Earth. She is an expert games player, especially fighting video games, and takes the revived Azaka as her pupil. During the three part special episodes 'Time and Space Adventures', which seem to be homages to various genres or specific shows/films, Sasami is usually side-lined away from the main story, except of course in her own in which she once again plays the role of 'Pretty Sammy'. It is worth noting that even in her own story she starts off as a background character, only taking center stage once she has transformed.

Tenchi Muyo in Love 1 & 2 These two movies are set in the Universe continuity and Sasami's personality remains the same. A manga companion to the second movie, Tenchi Muyo! in Love 2: Eternal Memory, shows what was supposedly happening to Sasami 'off-screen' and introduces Tsunami-kami-sama to the Universe continuity, but it is unknown if this is an official account to be considered as taking place in the same continuity as the movie. The manga implies that Sasami & Tenchi will one day have a child named Izumi, but Sasami will die soon after her birth. However, according to Sasami's narration, that was only one possible future. With every choice they make they can change their fate. It is also told that Tenchi might not choose Sasami but she'll still care for Tenchi the same as always.

Tenchi in Tokyo As with most of the characters, Sasami's personality became much louder than before. Her moods are more erratic, given to bouts of juvenile anger and sulking. She becomes friends with Yugi, before learning Yugi's true nature, but remains her friend until the end of the series. At the end of the series Sasami visits the now-sleeping Yugi every day. Ryo-Ohki is also her pet in this series.

Manga and Novels Hasegawa novels A series of books written by Naoko Hasegawa, a former scriptwriter for the OVA. The novels branch off after episode 6 of the OVA series. These novels were never translated however, so little is known about the character development in this time-line. In Manatsu no Eve/Daughter of Darkness, the Hasagawa novel Manatsu no Eve was made into a movie, and is the only contact most non-Japanese fans have had with this continuity. Sasami's connection to Tsunami-kami-sama from the OVA is not mentioned in the film. Sasami has more screen-time as she befriends Mayuka, Tenchi and Yuzuha's (the antagonist in this film) genetically engineered daughter. She quickly develops a strong bond with Mayuka.

Okuda manga Two official manga series have been created by Hitoshi Okuda – No Need For Tenchi and Shin Tenchi Muyo! (a.k.a. The All-New Tenchi Muyo!). Based on the OVA series and branching off after episode 13.5. The manga series generally has a lighter attitude than the anime series and the characters personalities reflect this. Sasami has a much more open relationship with Tsunami-kami-sama, who herself is more breezy than her own OVA counterpart, possibly due to Sasami's influence, but more likely by Okuda-sensei wanting to write her that way. Sasami is the only person, in the manga or the anime, that Tenchi has said the words "I love you" to. In volume 5 of the second manga series, Sasami's age is given as 709 years; however, Sasami's age was returned to 708 in volume 7 of the second manga series for unknown reasons. Possibly a mistranslation in either volume.

In spinoffs

Sasami Kawai is the title character in the Pretty Sammy OVA series and its television series Magical Project S. There, she is an ordinary elementary school student who transforms into magical girl Pretty Sammy.

Sasami Iwakura is the title character in the spin-off series Sasami: Magical Girls Club. Instead of transforming into a magical girl, she is already one who discovers that she, her best friend Misao, as well as some of her other classmates are magical girls.

=== Tsunami ===
Tsunami
- Tenchi Muyo character
- Voiced by: Japanese: Chisa Yokoyama; English: Sherry Lynn; Lara Cody (Pretty Sammy OVA 2 and 3)

In-universe information
- Species: Choushin
- Relatives: Washu Hakubi (sister); Tokimi (sister); Sasami Masaki Jurai (assimilation, OVA)

Tsunami (津名魅; trans. Port with a Bewitching Name) is a fictional character in the Tenchi Muyo! universe.

Tsunami appears in the OVA version of the anime series Tenchi Muyo!, as its novels (True Tenchi Muyo!) and the manga series written by Hitoshi Okuda. In Tenchi Muyo! Ryo-Ohki and related works she is one of the Choushin, three Goddess-sisters and powerful beings in the story. She also appears in the series' spin-off Pretty Sammy. Here she is a candidate to become the next queen of the magical realm of Juraihelm.

OVA version

As noted above, Tsunami appears as one of the three Choushin. In fact, she has appeared in several different roles:

Tsunami-kami-sama

The suffix of -kami-sama can be literally defined as "spirit lord/lady" and adding it to a name implies a superior divine connection; while kami can mean "god", kami-sama means "God" (such as The Almighty, Kami-sama, in Oh My Goddess!). Tsunami-kami-sama, along with her sisters Washu-kami-sama and Tokimi-kami-sama, were in existence before time and space began, and have spent at least trillions of years working towards locating a certain individual, a being who was as powerful compared to them as they are to ordinary beings, presumably created them as an experiment, just as they created all of the rest of existence – and as such outside of and greater than even the hyperdimensional space that they inhabit. In fact, the sum totality of all creation was started by them after an unknown length of time spent trying to theorise the existence of such a being. They came to the conclusion that a more practical approach was needed.

As opposed to our own three-dimensional space, there are 22 spatial and temporal dimensions commonly known to exist within the Tenchi Muyo! Multiverse, due to that there are 22 known Dimensional Supervisors, one in charge of each dimensional space. Projective geometry states that each higher-dimensional space is an infinite number of times greater than the last, and Brane cosmology states that a multiverse is 5-dimensional, so the Dimensional supervisors working for the Choushin logically at least exceed multi versal scale times infinity raised to the power of 17.

When the android Zero, who had access to the greatest scientific database in the universe, enormously more advanced than human science, is asked to analyze the Choushin Tokimi, it is stated that despite being able to create a hypothesis for any high-dimensional lifeforms, Tokimi registers as not existing at all, and as impossible to create a scientific hypothesis for (even an infinite-dimensional Hilbert Space), due to being beyond dimensional space altogether.

Little is known of Tsunami-kami-sama's history before 150,000 years ago. It is known that, due to certain extreme circumstances, Tsunami-kami-sama was responsible for annihilating most – if not all – of an ancient civilization who existed before the precursor race. Such massive devastation may not seem typical to the Tsunami-kami-sama known today, but her 3-dimensional shadow recently engaged in a minor fight with Tokimi-kami-sama, which destroyed almost a quarter of our galaxy (all damage was later repaired when time was rewound). The full power of the Choushin is far greater than all of existence can contain, and the sum totality of all of it combined was shown as a glowing mote of dust in comparison to the Choushin.

150,000 years ago, Tsunami-kami-sama met with the boy who would be the First King of Jurai and recognized within him the seeds of what she and her sisters were searching for. She agreed to provide him with her descendants, Ouke-no-ki or "Trees of the Imperial Family". These trees were sapient and powerful beings who would 'partner' with certain Juraians, providing them with great power and long life-spans. They were also the central core of Juraian ships, acting as power source and computer core, far more powerful than anything else at the time, thus allowing Jurai to become a galactic superpower.

Tenju

The largest tree on Jurai, 5,000 meters high, the Tenju ("Tree of Heaven") acts as the Royal Palace of Jurai, housing the current Emperor and his family, the main homes of all of the Imperial Houses, and the Royal Arboretum. It is here that all Ouke-no-ki await a partner that they will bond with. Legend has it that the Tenju was created from the giant body of Tsunami-kami-sama.

Tsunami-no-ki

Like -kami-sama, -no-ki is a suffix (this is a formal version. Simply adding -ki is also acceptable), this time meaning that the name is for a tree. After creating the Tenju, Tsunami-no-ki came into being at the very base of the Royal Arboretum. It was from this tree that Tsunami created the first seeds that would become first generation Ouke-no-ki. It is believed that at least ten first-generation seeds have been known to exist, two of which seemed to have been created before she became Tsunami-no-ki. Of these two, one was used in the creation of a battle robot known as the 'Idol' and the other may have given to someone from outside this story's universe. Details from this time are sketchy at best. When Sasami was injured during Ryoko's attack on Jurai, she landed near Tsunami-no-ki and it was here that they assimilated. Tsunami-no-ki has now been moved to become the central core of Tsunami-fune.

Although very powerful, later generations of Ouke-no-ki gradually became less powerful as they progress from Tsunami-no-ki. They also lose their 'Will' (that is, their minds and/or soul) if they are rooted on another planet. Funaho-no-ki was believed to be an example of this, but the tree did not lose its Will because of Washu's gems on the pommel end of Tenchi-ken, which provided the tree with power. If a tree loses its Will, then the partner will slowly age and die.

Tsunami-fune

-fune (船 or 舟) is a suffix used for names of ships (in this case spaceships, but it may also be used for other craft). Tsunami-fune is known to be "the most powerful of all ships" (quote from episode 6, 'We Need Tenchi!). This reputation is well justified. For one thing, Tsunami-fune is able to control all Ships of Jurai, since it is from her that the Ships power is derived. Also, Tsunami-fune's defenses are 100% impenetrable by any form of attack in our three dimensions, due to her ability to generate ten Koh-Oh-Yoku, or "Light-Hawk-Wings". Ten Wings represent the maximum force that can be generated at any one point in our dimensions. Any more would shatter the multiverse. Tsunami-fune has demonstrated matter-transportation, multiple-environment generation, energy-based weaponry and sub-space travel. Tsunami-fune is officially listed as belonging to Sasami. It is unknown exactly when or how Tsunami-fune was created, but it is estimated to be between 700 and 695 years ago. An alternate possibility is that the ship has always existed but remains hidden except for select periods when Tsunami decides it is needed, although considering the nature of Jurai ships, this is unlikely.

Sasami

When Sasami was about 3 years old, she assimilated with Tsunami (see Sasami entry) and Tsunami-kami-sama's consciousness now resides within Sasami. In episode 9, 'Sasami and Tsunami', Tsunami appears as a 3D image and says that her form is Sasami's adult form. Since it is known that Tsunami's current image was the same before Sasami was even born, this is either an amazing coincidence or Tsunami and Sasami were connected before Sasami was even born – which is entirely possible due to Tsunami's 11D nature. The two 'souls' of Tsunami-kami-sama and Sasami are merging and one day the two of them will be a single being. In episode 19, it is established that the personalities of the two are one and the same; when Sasami fears for Tenchi's safety, Tsunami must act, even at the risk of a confrontation with Tokimi.

Tsunami has not gone from one form to another, but exists in all forms simultaneously, with the possible exception of the Tenju.

Pretty Sammy

In the Pretty Sammy series, Tsunami is one of the candidates to be the queen of Juraihelm. After she was chosen, she chose Sasami Kawai to act as her representative on Earth. In doing so, Sasami became known as the magical girl, Pretty Samy.

Personality wise, Tsunami is somewhat more like Mihoshi, a more carefree, relaxed, even slightly ditzy. For example, when she and Sasami first met, she had mistaken the music of Mozart for Beethoven. When Ramia used a cheesy-looking doll to stand-in for her during the episode involving Bif Standard, Tsunami actually thought it was the genuine article.

Tsunami is also clueless about Ramia's efforts to derail her chances to be queen of Juraihelm. When Ramia had disappeared after a caper went wrong, Tsunami, who was grief-stricken, put up posters asking for Ramia's return.

In Magical Project S (Pretty Sammy TV), Tsunami is much the same as her series counterpart, except now with a great love for flowers; in fact, one of her goals as queen of Juraihelm was to "plant flowers across the entire galaxy". Despite this, she eventually managed to win the candidacy.

=== Mihoshi Kuramitsu ===
Mihoshi Kuramitsu
- Tenchi Muyo! character
- Created by: Masaki Kajishima
- Voiced by: Japanese: Yuko Mizutani; Kumiko Yokote (Sasami Magical Girls Club, credited as Hyo-sei); Michie Tomizawa (Ryo-Ohki 4); English: Ellen Gerstell (Ryo-Ohki 1 and 2, Mihoshi Special (as Jean Schwarts), Universe, Tenchi Muyo in Love, Magical Girl Pretty Sammy OVA 1); Rebecca Forstadt (Magical Girl Pretty Sammy OVA's 2 and 3, Tenchi in Tokyo, Daughter of Darkness, Tenchi Forever, Ryo-Ohki 3, GXP, Ai Tenchi Muyo); Colleen Clinkenbeard (Sasami: Magical Girls Club)

In-universe information
- Relatives: Washu Hakubi (great-great-grandmother); Minami Kuramitsu (grandfather); Mitoto Kuramitsu (mother); Misao Kuramitsu (brother)

Mihoshi Kuramitsu (九羅密 美星, Kuramitsu Mihoshi) is a Galaxy Police detective in the fictional Tenchi Muyo! anime and manga series. Her given name，"Mihoshi" (みほし、美星), literally means "Beautiful Star", and is derived from a town in the Okayama Prefecture formerly known as Bisei.

OVA

In the OVA, Mihoshi is a Seniwan and a member of the Kuramitsu family, whose power is second only to the Jurai Royal Family.

Mihoshi is known as one of the finest officers in the Galaxy Police, but her career soon hit a major roadblock after an incident hinted at in the 4th episode of the 1st OVA, and the 4th episode of the 3rd one (it has been alluded that the incident involved an arranged marriage, which would factor in Misao's attack later in the series). Now she suffers from frequent difficulties to focus on a single thought track and, due to her clumsiness, she causes a lot of collateral damage during her assignments, which eventually causes Mihoshi to be demoted. The desk of the Section 7 commander is covered with misconduct reports and bills from all the damages she causes. As a result, she is assigned to a special area of the galaxy, the Sol system, which is Juraian territory, in the vain hope that she wouldn't cause any more trouble.

However, when Kagato closed in on this area, Mihoshi's immediate superior, Captain Nobeyama, assigned her to monitor the area and report if Kagato came near. However, Mihoshi misinterpreted those orders and took it upon herself to capture him, which panicked Nobeyama. But when she got near Earth, her shuttle is pulled into an energy vortex caused by a monster Ryoko had created to attack Ayeka. Mihoshi almost ends up getting sucked into the black hole the opening created if Tenchi Masaki had not caught her. As a result, Mihoshi stays with the Masaki family. Like all the other girls living at the Masaki home, she eventually develops an attraction toward Tenchi.

When Kagato attacks, Mihoshi's causality-bending causes Washu to be released from her crystal prison on board Soja's 'reversed universe'. When Kagato's serpent guards attack her, Mihoshi uses her control cube in an attempt to stop them and the interference it creates somehow releases Washu. (The cube's apparent function is similar to that of a Rubik's Cube, and finding the correct combination to produce a desired effect is often problematic for Mihoshi.)

Mihoshi somehow constantly enters Washu's subspace lab and breaks things, (much to Washu's consternation, as she still cannot figure out how Mihoshi can somehow accidentally switch dimensions and bypass all of her lab's security systems), sleeps often, eats like a pig (mostly on junk food, but she exercises often), and is the luckiest officer in the Galaxy Police (though she is also quite competent), though her luck sometimes spells misfortune for others (somewhat like fellow GXP officer, Seina Yamada). Washu has great respect for her vast causality-bending attributes, and Mihoshi has been repeatedly referred to as the only member of the household who can defeat her.

Mihoshi is actually the great-great-granddaughter of Washu, through her son Mikumo, although this is only stated outside the series itself, and her grandfather Minami Kuramitsu is the Grand Marshal of the Galaxy Police. Mihoshi's mother Mitoto also works for the Galaxy Police, as a cleaning lady. She also has a younger brother, Misao, who had married Mashisu Makibi. Whether her kinship with and ability to constantly circumvent one of the Choushin goddesses is a sign that she's yet another of the series' transcendental anomalies is unconfirmed at this point. However, it is noteworthy that her mother Mitoto has a reminiscent ability to subconsciously travel vast interstellar distances. Whether she shares her daughter's causality-bending talent is unknown at this point, but Minami, Mikami and Misao apparently don't.

Although she tends to eat and sleep a lot, Mihoshi is very serious about her job in the G.P, doesn't mind helping out with regular household work, and seems better at it than Ryoko or Ayeka. She is apparently extremely observant, as she has been known to write very extensive, but very unstructured reports... cluttered with details, so it can sometimes take her superiors a long while to figure them out. In fact, because her report on the Kagato incident included detailed information on the Jurai royal trees, her report is now TOP SECRET with Jurai Intelligence (Funaho Jurai once confessed to Washu that it took Jurai Intelligence four days to summarize the report). A duplicate report, omitting the sensitive information, was submitted in its place.

Mihoshi's name refers to the planet "Venus", but in the Western sense as "Pretty Star", not the Chinese sense of "metal star".

In OAV 3 (episodes 14-20), she seems to have taken on a few of the characteristics from the other series; she becomes less competent, and appears more confused than usual (though this may simply be a result of her, and much of the regular cast, having less screen time than in the other OVA episodes). She is a former partner of both Noike Jurai and Amane Kaunaq, who seem embarrassed by Mihoshi's affectionate behavior, but Noike handles her through yelling and pushing her around (it is not known how Amane handled Mihoshi).

Tenchi Universe

In the Tenchi Universe series, Mihoshi is partnered with Kiyone Makibi, and together, they are known as "Miho-Kiyo" (a portmanteau of Mihoshi and Kiyone; it was coined by Washu in episode 6). She is in pursuit of Ryoko until they both crash-land on Earth.

Unlike her OAV counterpart, who still is dedicated and competent despite her ditziness, Mihoshi is the comic relief and a "dumb blonde" whose constant bumbling and blunders would often cause trouble for the group (especially for Kiyone and Washu). One of her classic mistakes is when a single hair from her scalp was able to transfer her personality into Mecha Washu.

Tenchi in Tokyo

In Tenchi in Tokyo, Mihoshi is once again partnered with Kiyone. In a flashback story, the Miho-Kiyo duo worked with the Juraian forces (led by Ayeka) to capture Ryoko and Washu to reclaim the Jurai Light Stone (which they stole). Eventually, they were forced to crash-land on Earth after Washu detected great energy emitting from the planet.

She is more or less the same as her Tenchi Universe counterpart, but she has some of the OAV qualities (e.g., her luck).

Pretty Sammy & Sasami: Mahou Shōjo Club

In the Pretty Sammy OAV, Mihoshi Mizutani (水谷 美星, Mizutani Mihoshi) (as she is known in both series; she was given the last name of her Japanese voice actress, Yuko Mizutani) works at Chihiro Kawai's (Sasami and Tenchi's mother) CD Vision music store with Kiyone Yuri. She is enrolled in college.

In Magical Project S (Pretty Sammy TV), as well as in Sasami: Magical Girls Club, Mihoshi is Sasami and Misao's teacher. In the Pretty Sammy TV series, she would challenge Kiyone's class in various school activities. It was also implied that she and Kiyone Amayuri have known each other since junior high, whom Mihoshi has always treated her as her best friend.

In all three of these adaptions, Mihoshi is still her usual airhead self.

Tenchi Muyo in Love

In the movie Tenchi Muyo in Love, Mihoshi takes on a teaching job while remaining undercover. She is seen teaching an English class. Her partner Kiyone takes on a janitorial job, and is annoyed or embarrassed by Mihoshi's ditzy mannerism.

=== Ryo-Ohki ===
Ryo-Ohki
- Tenchi Muyo character
- Ryo-Ohki (Cabbit and Humanoid Form)
- Created by: Masaki Kajishima
- Voiced by: Japanese; Etsuko Kozakura; Ema Kogure (Sasami: Magical Girls Club); English; Debi Derryberry; Mona Marshall (GXP); Zach Bolton (Sasami: Magical Girls Club)

In-universe information
- Species: Cabbit (half rabbit/half cat)
- Gender: Female (Tenchi Muyo!); Male (Pretty Sammy)
- Relatives: Washu Hakubi (mother/creator, OVA); Ryoko Hakubi (half-sister, OVA); Fuku ("sister; Tenchi Muyo! GXP")
- Abilities: Spaceship Transformation

Ryo-Ohki (魎皇鬼, Ryō-ōki; lit. "royal ghost monster", sometimes written Ryo-Oh-Ki), is a fictional character in the Japanese anime series Tenchi Muyo! and its spinoffs. Ryo-Ohki's appearance is similar to a cross between a cat and a rabbit, and for this reason Ryo-Ohki is commonly referred to as a cabbit. Ryo-Ohki also served the role of mascot for Pioneer Entertainment before that division of Pioneer Corporation became Geneon.

Ryo-Ohki's appearance as what fans describe as a "cabbit", love of eating carrots, and association with the character Sasami are common among all of the series in which Ryo-Ohki appears. Ryo-Ohki is usually a shape changer, but the shapes, aside from the "cabbit" form, vary according to the series. Ryo-Ohki's background and other traits vary considerably from one series to another.

OVA

In the Tenchi Muyo! Ryo-Ohki Original Video Animation (OVA) series, Ryo-Ohki is a unique artificial life-form created by Washu. She is initially Ryoko's spacecraft and power-conduit (see below), as well as technically being Ryoko's sister (they are both Masu-hybrids). She and Sasami quickly become attached to each other, however, and she generally chooses to spend her time with Sasami rather than Ryoko. She possesses the ability to transform herself into a small animal form, generally referred to as a 'cabit', a contraction of 'cat-rabbit', which she gained after Ryoko resurrected herself in episode 1. Following an incident later in the series, she gains the ability to shift to two catgirl-like humanoid forms — a child form and an adult form. However, her adult form is rarely seen, both because she has the mind of a child, and because she has trouble walking on two legs.

Ryo-Ohki's personality is that of a carrot-loving animal. She also has a bit of a crush on Tenchi, though it is not exactly romantic. A dive into her mind reveals that it is filled with images of her and Tenchi harvesting carrots. In addition, she likes to entertain people, such as with her small dance number in Episode 13. She has the mental state of a child, and does not appear to think beyond her next carrot or hug.

Ryo-Ohki was originally created by Washu as a means for Ryoko to access and control the vast power contained within her gems, hence the small gem set in Ryo-Ohki's forehead. Seven hundred years ago, the combined power of Ryoko and Ryo-Ohki was as great as a Juraian 1st Generation ship. Another danger is that, despite this power, it is completely possible to mass-produce Ryo-Ohkis, which is a great fear to the Juraian Royal Family. Additionally, unlike some of the most advanced Juraian battle ships (such as the Chobimaru) that can use an elemental tactic for either defense or offense, Ryo-Ohki can use up to three of four elemental tactics at the same time (wind, water, and fire).

In Tenchi Muyo! GXP, Ryo-Ohki appears in episodes 12, 15, and 17. Also in the English anime version of episode 12, Ryo-Ohki has learned to speak human dialect. Ryo-Ohki has also gained a younger sister of sorts, in the form of Fuku.

Manga

In Hitoshi Okuda's two manga series (generally set in the OVA continuity), Ryo-Ohki is much the same. She is shown in a few sequences as not as much an animal as a young girl, however, especially in the more recent All-New Tenchi Muyo! titles. In these, she's also shown as another rival for Tenchi's affections, and in a sequence judging all of the girls, she is shown as tying them all with a score of 100 (her score is outside the frame, but her score doll is shown in a cheering pose like the others'; she was considered a serious challenger and had a session with Tenchi; there was no mention of any of the six women/girls having been shown as inferior in any way). Generally, Ryo-Ohki prefers her young child form in these stories; she *has* used her 'adult' form twice (once to date Tenchi, once to work out).

Ryo-Ohki has two relatively unusual sequences in the manga. In volume 3 of The All-New Tenchi Muyo!, a short story features her reaction to a prank from Ryoko when she suggests that carrots will make her fat. In this story, she's shown as capable of conversing with Washu clearly, and somehow communicating with Sasami. Her thoughts are shown in clear language.

In volume 8, during the story dealing with the matchmaker (and the aforementioned contest), the matchmaker's robot secretary is shown falling in love with something that resembles a Ryo-Ohki plush or puppet, eventually wishing to marry it. It is referred to as 'Ryo-Ohki', and Washu verifies she can fly herself, although the 'real' Ryo-Ohki is definitely active during this story. This may be one of the 'other' Ryo-Ohki-like creatures seen in one episode of the OVA and one story in the manga, where other "cabit"s are shown. No explanation is given for them, or their relation to the 'main' Ryo-Ohki.

Tenchi Universe

In the Tenchi Universe continuity, Ryo-Ohki is not unique; another "cabbit", named Ken-Ohki (owned by Nagi) appears in the series, raising the possibility of still more "cabit"s – perhaps an entire species – existing. Her origins are not known. She is otherwise similar to her OAV incarnation, serving as Ryoko's companion and spaceship and Sasami's pet. As a humorous plot device, Ryo-Ohki and Ken-Ohki are fond of each other while their owners are bitter enemies. Ryoko suggested that Ryo-Ohki is in love with Ken-Ohki. She also "informed" Sasami in Episode 10 that Ken-Ohki is, in fact, a male, while Ryo-Ohki is a female.

Tenchi in Tokyo

In Tenchi in Tokyo, Ryo-Ohki is Sasami's pet and guardian, as Azaka and Kamidake are for Ayeka. She still transforms into a spaceship from time to time, albeit smaller than in other series, but can also transform into a gigantic pink-colored mecha, which is either piloted by Sasami or autonomously.

Pretty Sammy

In the Pretty Sammy OAV series, Ryo-Ohki can speak and is male. He serves as an advisor to Sasami, who becomes the magical girl Pretty Sammy. This relationship is a reference to the magical-girl genre convention of the animal advisor; it was most likely meant as a parody of the relationship between Sailor Moon and her cat Luna. He also has a young male humanoid form.

In the Pretty Sammy television series (also known as Magical Project S), Ryo-Ohki is a boy from the magical dimension of Juraihelm, who takes the shape of a "cabit" in order to serve as Sasami's advisor. Like the OAV version, he speaks while in "cabit" form.

Sasami: Mahou Shojo Club

Not much is known about Ryo-Ohki at this point except that it is the "pet" of Washu Kozuka. However, it has been shown that Washu can be cruel to the animal if it suits her needs. This is why, just like its counterparts in other Tenchi series, it stays with Sasami.

The cabit can shape shift in a manner similar to its Tenchi Muyo self. It is unknown at this point if it has a human form. It is also unknown if Ryo-Ohki is male, female or perhaps neuter.

=== Washu Hakubi ===
Washu Hakubi
- Tenchi Muyō! character
- Created by: Masaki Kajishima
- Voiced by: Japanese; Yuko Kobayashi; Akiko Hiramatsu (Sasami: Mahou Shoujo Club); English; Kate T. Vogt (a.k.a. Gee Gee Loo Loo); Jessica Gee (GXP); Luci Christian (Sasami: Magical Girl's Club); Karen Strassman (Ai Tenchi Muyo)

In-universe information
- Nicknames: "Little Washu" "Washu-chan" "The Greatest Scientific Genius in the Universe"
- Relatives: Tsunami (sister); Tokimi (sister); Mikamo Kuramitsu (husband, divorced); Mikumo Kuramitsu (son); Ryoko Hakubi (daughter); Ryo-Ohki (creation/adopted daughter, OVA); Fuku (creation/adopted daughter; Tenchi Muyo! GXP); Mitoto Kuramitsu (great-granddaughter); Mihoshi Kuramitsu (great-great-granddaughter); Misao Kuramitsu (great-great-grandson); Minagi ("Ryoko's clone"; Manga continuity)

Washu Hakubi (白眉 鷲羽, Hakubi Washū), the self-proclaimed greatest scientific genius in the universe, is a fictional character in the anime and manga Tenchi Muyo!. Her character differs depending on the continuity, though she sometimes displays a number of innate powers which she rarely uses, preferring to solve problems with reason or technology. In all incarnations, Washu has also shown to be somewhat prudent and is generally trickier to fool than Tenchi or the other girls, which makes it harder for her to fall into an enemy trap. In all three Tenchi series Washu had also created an inter-dimensional laboratory in the closet of the Masaki house, although her laboratory is a lot bigger in the OVA series than in both of the TV series.

The name "Washū" is an ancient one for Japan; specifically, the region around Osaka. The name "Hakubi" was derived from the name of a train line, the Hakubi Line. When translated, Washū means "eagle-feather", and hakubi means "excellence". Washu's hair is derived from a costume from Noh plays, intended to resemble the (usually black) legs and claws of a crab. For her, it is a red crab because this is a food specialty of Osaka. As such, the red crab logo appears on much of her merchandise and miscellaneous apparel.

Tenchi Muyo! Ryo-oki Washu has a much larger role in the OVA than in any of the other series. In fact, she is the catalyst of, if not directly involved in, the majority of the conflict of the series.

In Tenchi Muyo! Ryo-Ohki, she is over 20,000 years old as a human, the mother of Ryoko, creator of the Soja and Ryo-Ohki, and one of the three Choushin goddesses along with Tsunami and Tokimi (choushin means "super-deity", 超神, but not pronounced chojin to differentiate her from the other "super-deity"). But in order to solve the riddle of finding an entity that was as powerful compared to them as much as they were to ordinary beings, and who presumably created them as an experiment, just as they had created all of 22-dimensional reality. In addition, they created one dimensional supervisor for each of them. D3 has absolute authority over all 3-dimensional space, and so onwards up until D22. Eventually, Washu-kami-sama chose to seal up her powers and memories in the three gems (which were later given to Ryoko) and assumed a mortal form to analyze the mysteries of the universe. These gems have the "same quality and power" as the Juraian trees, and are capable of sustaining the youth of a Juraian such as Yosho.

Washu, during her lifetime, also gave birth naturally to a child of her own; the child, whose name is Mikumo Kuramitsu, is actually Mihoshi Kuramitsu's great-grandfather. However, because the father came from the prestigious Kuramitsu family, both he and the baby were taken away. Out of grief, Washu chose never to deal with these adult issues again and altered her body to that of a pre-adolescent girl, although Washu is able to return to her adult form if she wishes to. Washu was locked away by her assistant, Kagato, for 5,000 years until she was inadvertently freed by Mihoshi.

After Kagato's defeat, Washu moved into the Masaki house and has made Tenchi her love and research project, the latter much to Tenchi's chagrin, while the former was expressed in her offer to only have another baby if it is Tenchi's. Aloof yet down to earth, she balances the household and dispels most of the chaos. She had briefly resumed her form as Washu-kami-sama when Z had threatened the universe by battling Tenchi.

In the OVA Ryoko has generally the same powers as Washu, except Washu uses them to a lesser extent. Washu has the same ability to phase shift through solid objects, convert matter directly to energy with no entropic loss (in the form of an energy saber), and she can duplicate herself. One of her favorite tricks, when captured, is to reappear elsewhere, and point to the "her" that was captured, which is now merely a stuffed doll in her likeness, sometimes with a cute ribbon if she remembers to add it.

Washu is also the creator of Fuku, Ryo-Ohki's sister, in the Tenchi Muyo! GXP series.

In the spinoff Tenchi Muyo! War on Geminar, which occurs 15 years after the GXP series, Washu is revealed to have hypnotised Tenchi's half-brother Kenshi Masaki sometime prior to him being sent on a cross-dimensional journey to Geminar. Kenshi briefly refers to her as "Washu-nee" when he talks about the medicine he gives to Ulyte, which means Washu could be one of Kenshi's sisters in law.

Tenchi Universe

In Tenchi Universe, Washu was banished from the Universal Science Academy for producing weapons of mass destruction, and she was sent to Earth, imprisoned in the Masaki Shrine for 700 years, until she was freed during a squabble involving Ryoko and Ayeka. Washu was portrayed as an egotistical mad scientist, with two dolls (named A and B) that pop up on her shoulders to proclaim her greatness and to cheer her on ("Washu, you are a genius!", "You can do it, Washu!", etc.).

She had at one time constructed Mecha Washu; a robotic duplicate of herself to act as an assistant to her scientific work. She had asked Tenchi to help her out in duplicating her mind into the robot, but Mihoshi had also entered the lab, and somehow left a single strand of her hair into the transfer apparatus. As a result, instead of Washu's mind in Mecha Washu, the robot got not only Mihoshi's mind, but also her personality. After Mecha Washu got out of control as a result, it took Kiyone's knowledge of Mihoshi's habits to wrangle the robot to watch Mihoshi's favorite show... Moldiver, where it was shut down safely.

Washu, near the end of the series, talked with Tenchi, who was depressed as his grandfather was easily defeated by Kagato. Washu was able to convince him that he could wield a greater force of Jurai power than his grandfather, and then helped disable a portion of the Jurai fleet in the final battle with her supercomputer virus. At the end of the series, Washu was the elected honorary president of the Universal Science Academy, promising to only use her powers for peace. She was kicked out a month later for developing a weapon capable of destroying the entire universe (though as Tenchi narrates, no one was surprised). Washu eventually returned to Earth.

Tenchi in Tokyo

In Tenchi in Tokyo, Washu was a renegade scientist who had helped Ryoko steal the Jurai Light Stone, an artifact of the planet, and was pursued by the Juraian forces (led by Ayeka) and the Galaxy Police (led by Mihoshi and Kiyone). During the chase, Washu sensed an unusual energy source emitting from Earth, and after they were forced to crash-land on Earth, Washu sensed that the power came from Tenchi's necklace (an heirloom handed down from his late mother, Achika Masaki). Throughout the series, while researching his necklace, Washu invented various items that would allow the girls to see Tenchi during his time in Tokyo (notably, a dimensional portal); however, her inventions would often malfunction. Personality-wise, she's still a mad scientist, but she is more mellowed-out than her Tenchi Universe incarnation.

When Yugi's plot had scattered the Masaki family, Washu was the only one not fooled by it, and after analyzing Yugi from her previous attack against the Masaki shrine, Washu found out she came from Jurai. With some help from Ayeka, Washu discovered the ruins to which Ayeka had been previously with Tenchi were actually a prison meant to hold Yugi, as she had been imprisoned for nearly destroying Jurai 3,500 years ago. Washu later sent an analysis robot to analyze Sakuya Kumashiro, as she suspected that Sakuya might be some factor in Yugi's plan, which proved to be true when the scan showed that Sakuya was a shadow of Yugi. With her Gem Analysis complete, Washu went with Katsuhito to Tokyo, and she explained everything to Tenchi about Yugi and why she worked so hard to break them up. After that, Washu observed the final battle against Yugi, when she was transported to Yugi's dimension and at the end of the series went to work on a new Dimensional Tunnel by using the power of the gems.

Pretty Sammy

In the Magical Girl Pretty Sammy OVA series, she is an Earth child prodigy known as Washu Kobayashi (小林 鷲羽, Kobayashi Washu), and in Magical Project S (Pretty Samy TV), Washu Fitzgerald Kobayashi (鷲羽 フィッツジェラルド 小林, Washu Fittsujerarudo Kobayashi) (she was given the last name of her voice actress, Yuko Kobayashi). Graduating from M.I.T. at eleven years old, she became the high school science teacher at Raioh Academy. She would help Pretty Sammy on various events, regardless if Pretty Sammy even wanted her help. When she's not following Pretty Sammy around, she works at Sasami's school as her science teacher. She also has moved across the street from Sasami and Tenchi's house and it was never established if she knew Pretty Sammy's secret identity.

Washu is also credited in Pretty Sammy OVA episode 2 as the inventor of the Internet.

In Magical Project S, she is an American and she has a habit of addressing Sasami's father Ginji as Johnny, just as he has a habit of addressing her as Catherine. Washu's role is similar to that of the Pretty Sammy OVA, but with the addition that she is also the first human to be fully aware of Sasami's secret identity as Pretty Sammy and only moved in next door to Sasami's house to keep an eye on Sasami and analyze her magic for research purposes. Later, she discovers that Misao is Pixy Misa. Her most notable appearance in the TV series was that after analyzing Pretty Sammy's magic, she was able to develop her own NT system that was used during Romio's attack on the Earth. Not only did it supply Pretty Sammy, Pixy Misa, Ryo-Ohki, and Rumiya with magic, but it also protected them from Romio's NT system.

Sasami: Magical Girls Club

In the anime Sasami: Magical Girls Club, she is Sasami's cooking teacher, Washu Kozuka (小塚 鷲羽, Kozuka Washu). She is also the mentor/advisor of the secret magical girl club and teaches its members the fundamentals of being a magical girl. She is also Ryo-Ohki's mistress, using the poor cabbit in some of her cooking demonstrations. Although she is the cooking teacher, it was revealed that she (ironically) cannot cook.

Tenchi Muyo! GXP

Washu plays a small part within the series, creating the Kamidake and its A.I., the Cabbit later christened Fuku (similar to Ryo-Ohki). She finally makes an appearance (along with Tenchi and the gang) in the episode "Homecoming" when Seina Yamada returns to Earth with the crew of the Kamidake. Her personality, while similar to, is a bit more mellowed out than her Tenchi Universe counterpart. Her final appearance in the series is at Seina Yamada's wedding.

=== Kiyone Makibi ===
Kiyone Makibi
- Tenchi Muyo character
- Created by: Naoko Hasegawa
- Voiced by: Japanese; Yuri Amano (Japanese); English; Sherry Lynn (Mihoshi Special, Pretty Sammy OVA 1, Tenchi in Love, Tenchi Universe); Wendee Lee (Tenchi in Tokyo, Pretty Sammy OVAs 2-3, Daughter of Darkness, Tenchi Forever)

Kiyone Makibi (真備 清音, Makibi Kiyone) is a fictional character of the Tenchi Muyo! series. She is an original creation of first OVA series' co-scriptwriter Naoko Hasegawa, appearing in most Tenchi Muyo! canons with the exception of the official OVA canon accepted by the series creator Masaki Kajishima.

She shares her name with Kiyone Masaki, the character introduced as Tenchi's official canonical mother in the third installment of the Tenchi Muyo! Ryo-Ohki OVAs.

History

Kiyone Makibi is a first class Galaxy Police detective who graduated with the second highest marks her year. Due to her her athletic and analytical skill, commitment to police work, and responsiblility, she was deemed among the best of the younger generation of Galaxy Police.

Stuck with the bumbling Mihoshi Kuramitsu as a partner, Kiyone's career suffered; she has become somewhat bitter and depressed with her misfortune, hoping that she can earn a promotion and transfer away from Mihoshi, which would ensure much better prospects for the future. But despite the trouble Mihoshi has brought her, Kiyone holds some hidden fondness for her partner, to such a degree that, when she is finally promoted, she continues to stand by her.

Kiyone is an exceptional detective with great sharpshooting skills with a GP Blaster, and is capable of using any of the GP-issue equipment properly. She also maintains a fondness towards karaoke. She also has a down-to-earth nature and, in a lot of depictions, lives in an apartment with Mihoshi rather than imposing on Tenchi.

Kiyone is not infatuated with Tenchi as the other girls are, Hasegawa novels aside, but expresses concern and care for him nonetheless.

Character origins and introduction

Kiyone made her debut in the first of Naoko Hasegawa's non-canon spinoff novels, One Visitor After Another: Hexagram Of Love (SenKyaku BanRai: Ai no Hexagram), released in May 1993. The best known of these books would be Manatsu no Eve, adapted into a film by AIC in 1997 and released by Pioneer LDC in the U.S. as Tenchi the Movie 2: The Daughter of Darkness. Her character proved very popular and would later be imported with a different background into the Mihoshi Special (where canon Tenchi creator Masaki Kajishima did her character designs), and after gaining a fan-base Kiyone would make future appearances in many Tenchi Muyo! series.

In the Mihoshi Special, Kiyone is assigned to rescue Investigator Tenchi and secure the stolen Ultra Energy Matter from the space pirate Ryoko with her. Accompanying them are Ayeka, the heiress of Jurai plutocrats, and the apprentice detective Sasami. After capturing Ryoko, Kiyone after looking through Ryoko's things found out the infamous Professor Washu was behind Ryoko's actions. But after Mihoshi released Ryoko who kidnapped Tenchi again, Kiyone became very depressed over Mihoshi's actions, feeling her career was now down the toilet. After heading to Washu's hideout Mihoshi, Kiyone and Ayeka were captured. Fortunately, Sasami became Pretty Sammy, and Kiyone was able to stop Washu from using her Galaxy Destroyer. But because of Mihoshi's bumbling, Kiyone accidentally fell over and disappeared. Although Mihoshi thought that Kiyone had sacrificed herself out of duty, unbeknownst to her Kiyone was still alive, alone and floating adrift in space plotting her partner's imminent demise.

Because this story is considered to be an exaggeration by Mihoshi, it is not part of the regular OVA canon; however, Kiyone proved appealing enough to become part of the TV series cast. A PC-FX game based on Tenchi Muyo! Ryo-Ohki (Tenchi Muyo! OVA 9.8: Crashing into Kiyone) later re-introduces her character, as she is ordered to check on her old partner. Joining her is the stowaway GP officer Hakua, a "protégé" of Mihoshi who finds it hard to believe that the erstwhile Kiyone was never actually dead. She is able to verify a few points in Mihoshi's story however, meaning that while details were exaggerated the "Ultra-Energy Matter" caper does have its basis in fact.

As with many characters in Tenchi Muyo! Kiyone was named after locations in Okayama Prefecture in Japan. The name "Kiyone" is taken from the Kiyone train station on Japan's Hakubi railway line. Kiyone was also the name of the village in Tsukubo District where Kiyone Station is located; the village was merged into the city of Sōja in March 2005. The name "Makibi" is taken from the town of Mabi, which was named after the famous scholar Kibi no Makibi; the town was merged into the city of Kurashiki in August 2005.

Negishi canon

Tenchi Universe

In the first Tenchi television series, Kiyone was assigned to locate her missing partner Mihoshi. But to her disbelief, not only was she alive but she was living with the galaxy's most wanted space pirate Ryoko, the two missing Jurai princesses Ayeka and Sasami, and the galaxy's legendary mad scientist Washu. Kiyone tried to arrest Ryoko with some assistance from Ayeka but failed because of Mihoshi's clumsiness. After contacting headquarters, Kiyone found out that she and Mihoshi had been transferred to patrolling the Solar System, which was very depressing for her. Not wanting to be a burden on Tenchi Masaki, Kiyone decides that she and Mihoshi would move into a low-rent apartment. However, difficulties arise as the officers take part-time jobs due to Mihoshi's incompetence and their GP duties, which often require immediate response (even in the middle of work).

After Ayeka and Sasami are accused of treason on planet Jurai, Kiyone found out that the Galaxy Police were aiding the Jurai military with the task of locating them. Because of Mihoshi, both of them were accused of being accomplices. With little choice, Kiyone joins the others to journey to Jurai to clear their names, using her shuttle the Yagami to travel across space; Washu created an interdimensional invention that allowed the Masaki Home to be put into the Yagami. At the end of the series, after being promoted to the GP's high ranks, Kiyone returns to earth for reasons unknown.

Tenchi Muyo! in Love

At the beginning of the first film, Kiyone and Mihoshi witness Kain's escape from and destruction of the GP headquarters, and are later "volunteered" by Ryoko to go back in time with the group to 1970 to save Tenchi's then-teenaged mother Achika from the criminal. While the others pose as students, teachers, or stay out of the way altogether, Kiyone has the decidedly unglamorous task of going undercover as the school janitor.

Later returned to the present for a brief time by Washu, Kiyone brings information and equipment back with her to help everyone deal with the threat. When a plan to convert spiritual energy from Tokyo's five-color Fudo shrines to generate enough Jurai power to recapture Kain fails, Washu sends the dimensional cannon, a weapon with enough destructive power to raze entire galaxies. Kiyone is charged with operating the machine, and fires just as Achika exits subspace with Kain in close pursuit, killing him and ending the villain's threat to the Masaki family.

Tenchi Forever!

Though Kiyone is not present over the course of most of the final film, the GP detective's role is still an important one; she and Mihoshi break into the Galaxy Academy to hack into their dimension stabilizing system so that Washu will be able to create a gateway to track down the missing Tenchi. Later, the two officers set up energy collectors on all the camellia trees planted by Katsuhito Masaki, thus giving Ryoko and Ayeka access to Haruna's fantasy world.

Tenchi in Tokyo

In Tenchi in Tokyo, Kiyone's character design and personality are quite different from in the previous series. Kiyone acts more along the lines of a manic depressive and is more driven towards being promoted and assigned to the Galaxy Police headquarters than her Tenchi Universe counterpart. She also expresses romantic feelings for Tenchi, feeling that he would be better off with a law abider like herself than with the others, though this may have just been to goad Ryoko to come back to Earth.

Mihoshi and Kiyone were originally part of the Galaxy Police task force assigned to apprehend the space pirate Ryoko and her partner Washu in order to recover the stolen Jurai Light stone. After the incident, Kiyone was unhappy with being assigned to Earth (her crush on Tenchi nonwithstanding) and would stoop to anything to put her life back on track. However, after arresting the criminal Bent Cougar in episode 18, she seems to be pleased with the opportunity for transfer to Pluto and was willing to forget all of her experiences on Earth, even after finding out that Ryoko once again became a space pirate. But after being assigned to infiltrate Ryoko's gang, Kiyone decided to find out why the space pirate returned to her old ways (at Mihoshi's suggestion). However, Yugi's servant Hotsuma, not wanting Ryoko to reconnect with her old friends, framed Kiyone and Mihoshi for tipping off the Galaxy Police and they fled.

Kiyone became more stable and less obsessed with matters concerning her job and promotion, and in the end chooses friendship over career ambitions by returning to Earth with Mihoshi to fight Yugi. But their shuttle was shot down en route by Tsugaru, another of Yugi's attendants. Using an experimental antimatter bullet, Kiyone was able to kill Tsuguru after Mihoshi shielded her from an attack; she then helped Tenchi and the others in the final battle against Yugi. Shortly thereafter, the two GP officers are all too happy to patrol the Earth beat once again.

Pretty Sammy

While not seen in the actual series, the whip-wielding Evil Kiyone makes her appearance in the music video for "Pretty Sammy, the Magical Girl", played during the end credits of the Mihoshi Special. This short, originally part of the Tenchi Muyo! Soundfile, marked Pretty Sammy's video debut, with Kiyone serving as the magical girl's first-ever animated foe. With her henchmen in tow (one being Amagasaki), Kiyone interrupts a lover's kiss between Sasami and Tenchi, stealing the boy away with her magical powers and cackling madly as they escape in her bicycle-powered spaceship. By transforming into Pretty Sammy, Sasami is able to stop them cold with the Pretty Coquettish Bomber, saving Tenchi from the ample witch's clutches.

In spite of gaining a small measure of popularity in Tenchi fandom, this Kiyone never makes a second appearance in later incarnations of the series.

During the Pretty Sammy OVAs, Kiyone – as Yuri Kiyone (清音 由梨, Kiyone Yuri) (she was given the first name of her Japanese voice actress, Yuri Amano, while her first name became her family name) – works alongside Mihoshi at CD Vision, the music store owned by Sasami and Tenchi's mother Chihiro Kawai. Kiyone is somewhat depressed, as Mihoshi had made it into college while she had failed her entrance exams.

In Magical Project S (AKA Pretty Sammy TV), Kiyone – as Kiyone Amayuri (雨百合 清音, Amayuri Kiyone) (her last name is a portmanteau of the name of Yuri Amano – Amano Yuri – although using different kanji) – works at Sasami and Misao's school as the teacher of a neighboring class. Kiyone has known fellow teacher Mihoshi Mizutani since junior high and deeply resents her. The noise from Mihoshi's class has a tendency to bother Kiyone incessantly, and she would jump at the chance to prove that she is a better teacher than Mihoshi.

What could have been an arranged marriage to Andou Toyokawa was busted by Pixy Misa and her Love-Love Monster Break-Up Girl, though most likely to the teacher's benefit. Having a rational mind, she finds it impossible to accept things so outside the norm as the events that often transpire at the school, and usually faints dead away when insanity erupts.

Okuda manga

Kiyone makes scant appearances in Hitoshi Okuda's manga, as the comics are based on the continuity of the first OVA, in which Kiyone does not take part. In the rare times she does make an appearance, it is usually for a role that takes place outside of "official" canon (i.e. Tenchi Muyo in Love or Pretty Sammy adaptations), sometimes breaking the fourth wall by begging for a larger part.

The GP officer also cameoed occasionally in Okuda's collection of yonkoma, "Tenchi, Heaven Forbid! G...", though she seems much happier forgotten, as the manga explains – tongue-firmly-in-cheek – Kiyone's whereabouts and just why she is not a force in Tenchi Muyo! Ryo-Ohki.

== Characters created for the film and television series ==
=== Main characters introduced in Ryo-Ohki ===
The following major characters were introduced in the Tenchi Muyo! Ryo-Ohki OVAs.

==== Clay ====
Dr. Clay
- Tenchi Muyo character
- Created by: Masaki Kajishima
- Voiced by: Seizō Katō (Japanese); Wes Mann (English)

Dr. Clay (Dr．クレイ, Dokutā Kurei) is the main antagonist from the second Tenchi Muyo! OVA series.

He was a colleague of Washu, before her capture by Kagato, and was highly jealous of her superior intelligence. The two, at one point, competed for the Jurai Science Academy's directors chair, but Washu won out. As a result, Clay had to settle for the post of head of the graduate school. At some point, he came into the employ of a mysterious and powerful extra-dimensional being known as Lady Tokimi, which allowed him to bring Washu to her, in exchange for the rule of a single galaxy. To this end, Clay had his creation Zero replace Ryoko, copying her form, powers, and memories.

He has great tendency of physically labeling or marking his favorite material objects with his own initial "ク" (ku) logo, including his own hat. Having everything of his favorite objects being marked with his own logo is subsequently his own downfall; having Washu finding his logo on Zero's (synthetic) buttocks and revealing the location of his spaceship's womanly bridge. In the end, Clay was arrested by Mihoshi, and the dying Zero was merged with Ryoko. Sometime after his arrest, Tokimi's servant D3 modified the memories of both Clay and Zero (while being merged with Ryoko?) to conceal Tokimi's existence.

==== Kagato ====
Kagato
- Tenchi Muyō! character
- Voiced by: Japanese; Norio Wakamoto; English; Michael Scott Ryan (also credited as "Weston Peese"); Wendee Lee (Female form)

In-universe information
- Alias: Yōshō (Tenchi Universe)
- Gender: Male (formerly a hermaphrodite, OVA)
- Title: Emperor of Jurai (Tenchi Universe)
- Relatives: Naja Akara ("mother", OVA); Yosho Jurai (brother, Tenchi Universe)

Kagato (神我人, Kagato) is a fictional character in the anime Tenchi Muyō!, serving as the main villain of the original OVAs. A second, alternate incarnation of the character was the antagonist of the initial TM! television series, Tenchi Universe. His name does suggests to be a sentence or a statement of sort, by the kanji 我人, possibly meaning "my people" or the name together roughly translating to "I am God Person"

Tenchi Muyō! Ryō-Ohki

Ruins Buster

He is Washu's former student, assisting her in the creation of her daughter, Ryōko, and in the building of the massive battleship, Sōja. Kagato has largely the same superhuman abilities as Washū and Ryōko, though whether he was born with these powers or achieved them by genetically altering himself is unclear. Kagato caught word of a historical artifact, one said to hold the "greatest energy in the universe". Ambitious with an amoral curiosity, he imprisons his mentor within her own ship, taking Sōja for his own and using it to pillage the galaxy (Washū would remain in his company for the next five thousand years). While not a psychopath who kills for the sake of killing, Kagato is not concerned with mortals or their feelings, thinking them "worth nothing more than dust"; they have their occasional use as tools, but are overall beneath his notice and not worth killing. However, he will not hesitate to kill should they offend him or if it coincides with a greater purpose; those caught in the collateral damage of his "scientific methods" are similarly out of luck.

Having a powerful psychic hold over Ryōko through the gems, Kagato uses her as his puppet to execute his orders, sending her on archaeological excavations as he scoured the universe for hints on his own. Once observed a location would be razed, whether it be populated or not, lest someone else replicate his research. In all, 3,326 ruins were destroyed, with great loss of life and innumerable cultural artifacts stolen. It was during this time Kagato earned the name "Ruins Buster" and a place on top the Galaxy Police's Eternally Wanted List. Slaves under a ruthless space pirate, Ryōko and Ryō-Ohki were recognized as major threats themselves.

Eventually, Kagato found the power was linked to Jurai and consequently its royal family bloodline, and Ryōko was sent on an errand to retrieve it. While successful in infiltrating the planet's defenses and causing considerable damage, Ryōko failed, and was pursued away from the planet by the First Prince Yōshō. Their psychic link severed – thanks to Yōshō confiscating the gems into his sword's pommel – Kagato abandons her for dead and commits to the exploration and collection of relics on his own, destroying whatever caught in his wake.

Arrival on Earth

Seven hundred years later, Ryōko is accidentally awakened by Tenchi Masaki, who gives her one of the gems to wear on her left wrist (she had asked for all three) in order to summon Ryō-ohki; the psychic link restored albeit weakened, Kagato sets course for Earth to reclaim his property. Once there he is pleased to find Ryōko has unwittingly collected all that he desires – Jurai's heir (Yōshō) and its royal princesses, (Ayeka Masaki Jurai and Sasami Masaki Jurai). He kidnaps Ryōko from the family onsen and greets the rescue party with mock geniality, sarcastically placing the trouble on Ryōko before Tenchi steps in with his sword. Seeing it as the key to unlocking the great power he'd sought, Kagato warns the boy not to swing around others' property so lightly, telling Tenchi to give up the sword and not his life. He is fascinated when Ryōko intervenes, wondering what she could ever see in the boy. Kagato reasserts his control over Ryōko (Kagato's control manifests itself in Ryōko's eyes; when she possessed all three gems her eyes glowed red, but with only one gem the whites of her eyes became light green, the same color as Kagato's sword) and has her take Tenchi hostage as he interrogates; Ayeka, Mihoshi, and Sasami stand by as Kagato wonders if Tenchi is aware of the sword's power and whether the boy is suitable to unlock it.

Tenchi is able to break free from Ryōko's grasp and attacks, but does nothing but nick Kagato's cheek (which quickly regenerates, but not before drawing greenish blood). Angry, Kagato engages the boy in swordplay to test him, and is sorely disappointed by the result. Reaching out for the sword, he is kept from collecting his treasure by its true owner, Yōshō; the two fight a fairly even match even with the enslaved Ryōko attacking in tandem. After severing Ryōko's left hand, freeing her of her gem and Kagato's control, Yōshō throws the weapon into his royal tree. Thinking his rival has given up, Kagato tries to retrieve it for himself, and is quite literally shocked when he grasps the sword handle: he is not ordained to be its owner. Realizing Tenchi is the sword's successor, Kagato teleports with Ryōko back to his ship, bidding the group to improve their skills as they'll be waiting for them.

He makes good on his word, attacking Ayeka, Tenchi, and Mihoshi from Sōja as they approach in a hybrid of Ryō-Ohki/Ryū-oh, all the while wondering why such fools would throw away their lives for someone as worthless (defective) as Ryōko. During the onslaught, Tenchi attempts to use the ship's Light-Hawk-Wings as a weapon rather than their intended purpose as defense, and it proves costly as they are overwhelmed; the bottom half of the ship is destroyed, with Tenchi caught along with it.

Fight aboard Sōja and aftermath

Ryoko is able to free herself and mounts a last-ditch effort for revenge with the others, not caring if she kills herself so long as Kagato dies with her. She and Ayeka personally engage Kagato, as Mihoshi gets lost along the way and accidentally frees Washu from the reverse side of the ship (though they're unable to get back). Neutralizing the threat, Kagato mentally prods Ayeka before trying to take her blood into himself to learn the secret by force, but finds he is blocked from doing so by the very object of his pursuit – Tsunami, First Ship of Planet Jurai and future incarnation of Sasami. Washu is able to free her daughter from her side of the ship in the meantime, but Ryoko is unable to fight to her full potential due in part to Ayeka's presence.

What everyone did not know at the time was that Tenchi had survived the first attack, although the lower half of his body was destroyed by the blast. The remaining upper half was preserved by a branch of Ryu-Oh and the guardians Azaka and Kamidake until Tsunami arrived. Once aboard her ship, Tsunami was able to fully regenerate Tenchi's body and revived him. She then informed him about the battle with Kagato, for which Tenchi wanted to help. Tsunami agreed, but she also told him she could not accompany him, mostly because she did not want to endanger Sasami as well.

Talking face to face again to his mentor after so many millennia, Kagato decides to show Washu a few new tricks. He draws in power from both Ryoko and her gems and the large-scale ones he'd crafted aboard Sōja, meaning to cause the destruction of Earth as an experiment to reminisce about the old days. Tsunami again steps in to stop the blast as Kagato has anticipated, though he doesn't count on the shot being reflected back at Sōja in bursts, bypassing the ship's shields. Kagato then plots to kill Ryoko on the spot so the full power of her gems will be Sōja's to use.

Tenchi is able to save Ryoko by severing Kagato's arm, though after the initial surprise the young man is beset, with Kagato taking the time to toy with him before invoking the power of the gathered gems into himself. As he draws Tsunami into his ship, Tenchi is despondent over his failure to save everyone, until he is reminded by a past talk with Tsunami to rely not on the sword, but on himself. Thinking him not quite sane, Kagato fires a shot at him directly, and is aghast to find Tenchi not only very much alive when the smoke clears but having produced Light-Hawk-Wings of his own – the only non-ship entity able to do so. Kagato is initially surprised, as the power from Tsunami that allows Light-Hawk-Wings to be created has been cut off from the rest of the universe, but he quickly realises that these Wings come from within Tenchi himself and do not rely on any connection to Tsunami.

As Tenchi is able to ward off all projectile attacks, Kagato engages Tenchi point blank, and their dueling sword strokes hew each other in half. But while Tenchi is able to regenerate, Kagato finds he cannot. He maintains his composure in his last moments, intrigued for the last time by how superbly done it all was. With Sōja cut in half as well, Tenchi and the others scramble to escape before it explodes.

The girl Kagato

In the final episode of the third OVA, it was revealed that Kagato was actually a hermaphrodite, having long discarded the female half out of spite for the gender. That gentler female half had resided within Noike Jurai, whereas Dr. Clay had placed a seal on the girl, preventing the female Kagato from completely merging with Noike. This had allowed Z to spy on the family through Noike's eyes while he plotted to kill Tenchi.

During the battle with Z, Tenchi was cut in half when he went to save Ryoko from a similar fate. It was during the brief instant in-between that Tenchi was able to meet the girl Kagato, who was found crying during a battle. Tenchi was able to comfort the girl, telling her everything was alright. Girl Kagato then asked if she could stay with him forever, which he agreed. But before Tenchi could inquire about something she said (during the battle, she pleaded, obviously to her male half that she was a Kagato too), he was drawn back into the battle with Z, with the girl pleading him not to leave her.

After Washu had noted that, before Z's attack that she knew that he was spying on them through Noike, it was found out that the Kagato cells were in her (the cells had Clay's logo on them), Tokimi used her powers to remove the female Kagato from Noike. Soon, Washu was able to remove the seal, and the female Kagato soon fully merged with Noike.

It is never explained, however, exactly how or why the female half of Kagato ended up residing in Noike, or why she was placed there in the first place.

Tenchi Muyo! novels and manga

Masaki Kajishima's novels shed a little more light on Kagato. Naja Akara was a student at the "Jurai Imperial Academy", and upon meeting Washu the two became close friends. Both were near equals in intellect, with outstanding academics that ranked them as elites of their class or any other. In fact, their diligence and commitment to academy affairs over the years was the driving reason behind divorcing the institution from the Juraians' control and reestablishing it themselves as the "Galaxy Academy".

Despite her intellect and standing, Naja had a bipolar yet jocular disposition, always trying to surprise her friend with an outstanding party or event (much to Washu's chagrin). For almost 15,000 years, the two would research the power of Washu's gems and ancient archaeological remnants, determined to unlock their full potential. Before their plans could come to fruition, Naja went missing while doing research on planet K-1190 under a pirate attack and was presumed dead (though her body was never found), but before doing so, rescued a number of refugees from the planet... including Ayeka and Sasami's future grandmother Seto, who was at the time orphaned by the attack. Grief-stricken over the loss, Washu attempted to clone Naja as some means of bringing her friend back by combining a lifeform known as Masu and Naja's own DNA.

The clone, however, exhibited behavior much different from the real Naja. Once the clone was born, she and Washu experimented on creating a being to control the power of the gems (research that would eventually lead to Ryoko's birth). During this time, the Naja clone spiritually possessed a male Ryoko prototype, and took the name "Kagato". Shortly thereafter, Kagato sealed Washu away, and pursued his own goal of figuring out the Unified Field Theory. After this, Kagato, with the help of an enslaved Ryoko, went on a 5,000-year crime spree that gained him his reputation. He is also the reason that Azusa came to meet Funaho, as he had lost in battle against Kagato and fled to Earth. Kajishima himself has hinted that Kagato may still be alive in some shape or form. This is possibly referring to the female half of Kagato, which is presumably the result of the female Naja clone possessing the male prototype. (See Noike Jurai for more details.)

Kagato has also made appearances in Naoko Hasegawa's novels and Hitoshi Okuda's two manga series, but all these books are considered outside "official" canon. In Okuda's manga, Kagato reappears in the form of a clone who holds all the memories of the original, but has a much more submissive personality and acts merely as a subordinate to a former student of the original.

Tenchi Universe

In the first television series, Kagato has a different appearance and origin than his OVA counterpart, as he is a great swordsman connected to Jurai's Royal Family (for that reason, he is also called Kagato Jurai by fans). He would have been the legendary hero instead of Yosho, but he became obsessed with power, committing countless destructive acts in his pursuit of more power. Yosho defeated him, and Kagato's name and likenesses were erased from Jurai's records and cities.

But years later Kagato would return to pose as Yosho, having greatly increased his power having spent his time in the Darkness of the Universe (presumably Hell). Such power granted him, among other things, Eternal Youth and a Master Key of his own (which resembled a dark bastard sword, as opposed to Tenchi-ken's tsurugi-like appearance). By posing as Yosho and displaying a fraction of his great power, he was recognized as Jurai's returning King and Emperor. Kagato then declared Ayeka and Sasami wanted for treason, all a part of his plan to eliminate the rest of Jurai's royal bloodline and to get revenge against his former friend Yosho. This forces the Tenchi family to leave Earth and journey to Jurai to clear their names.

After Katsuhito reveals that he is Yosho, Kagato confronted him at the old Jurai Palace. Although Yosho – and later, Ryoko – was no match for him, when Kagato saw Tenchi, he noticed his resemblance to Yosho and quickly realized that Tenchi is Yosho's descendant.

Taking Ayeka with him and leaving Yosho and Ryoko severely injured, Kagato told Tenchi that if he made it to the Jurai palace then he would challenge him, using Ayeka as leverage to draw Tenchi into the fight. With the help of his friends, Tenchi is able to ascend to the throne room and fight the false emperor directly. However, Kagato is far too strong and skilled for the fight to go evenly. He decides to instead kill Ayeka and end the fight at his leisure. Seeing what's about to happen, Tenchi is able to tap into his true potential. Similar to the original OVA the two trade sword blows, and it is again Kagato who falls. He doesn't reproach his killer in death, flashing back to how he lost to Yosho and how similar in the end it was.

==== Zero ====
Zero
- Tenchi Muyo! character
- Voiced by: Ai Orikasa (Japanese); Petrea Burchard (English)

In-universe information
- Alias: Ryoko

Zero (零, rei "zero, 0") is a fictional character in the Tenchi Muyo! anime series.

Zero is a creation of Dr. Clay, and possesses the ability to mimic another being, including that individual's memories. Using this talent, she abducts and temporarily replaces Ryoko.

However, Zero was unable to duplicate Ryoko's gems, despite being endowed this power by Lady Tokimi. Perplexed, Clay has Zero use the originals to make a complete copy. While successful, not only does Zero gain Ryoko's powers but her feelings towards Tenchi as well. She defies Dr. Clay's orders when he ordered her to kill Tenchi when he feared that he was a liability in her mission. Afterwards, Zero was confronted by Washu, who had found out earlier that Zero was a duplicate of Ryoko when she found Dr. Clay's logo on "her" buttocks when they took a bath together. Zero was ready to face her and Ayeka to capture Washu, but it ended when Tenchi showed up during their confrontation and Zero chose to flee in tears, not wanting to face him.

When Zero confronts Clay to ask him to leave Tenchi alone, the doctor uses his ring to short circuit her, but somehow Zero survived. Later, after Dr. Clay was captured, Washu fused Zero with Ryoko, which allowed Ryoko to be more open in her feelings.

=== Major characters introduced in Tenchi Muyo GXP ===
==== Noike Jurai ====
Noike Kamiki Jurai
- Tenchi Muyo! Ryo-ohki character
- Created by: Masaki Kajishima
- Voiced by: Japanese; Naomi Shindō; English; Kari Wahlgren (OVA 3); Mona Marshall (GXP)

In-universe information
- Alias: Noike Sakatsu
- Relatives: Seto Kamiki Jurai (adopted mother); Tenchi Masaki (assigned to guard); Utsutsumi Kamiki (adopted father); Misaki Kamiki Jurai (adopted sister); Doctor Clay (biological great-great-grandfather)
- Royal Tree: Kyoko (3rd Gen) (Experimental design)

Noike Kamiki Jurai (神木 ノイケ 樹雷, Kamiki Noike Jurai) is a fictional character in the Tenchi Muyo! anime series, debuting as a major character in the third OVA series and appearing in a cameo in Tenchi Muyo! GXP.

Noike Kamiki Jurai, or Noike Sakatsu, is the adopted daughter of Seto Kamiki Jurai. She was abandoned by her mother after her mother's fiancé decided that a child would be too much of a bother for them. She spent her childhood in an orphanage, and at some point, ended up in the GP Academy. Not to long after becoming a "1st class detective", Noike would meet with Mikami Kuramitsu, the principal of GP Academy. This meeting was arranged so that Noike might meet with Seto Kamiki Jurai, who would immediately go on to adopt her, bond her with a third-generation tree, arrange her marriage to Tenchi Masaki, and inadvertently introduce her to her new older sister, Misaki Kamiki Jurai.

She was a partner to Mihoshi Kuramitsu. It was during this period that by chance she was reunited with her natural (biological) mother while investigating a traffic accident and confronted her on why she was put up for adoption. Later on, she had been introduced as a fiancé to Tenchi Masaki. Naturally, Ryoko and Ayeka were not happy about the whole situation. Later, she revealed to Ryoko and Ayeka that her role as Tenchi's fiancé was in fact a ruse; she was actually keeping an eye on Tenchi and his household, which—containing Ryoko, Washu, two princesses of Jurai, and Tenchi himself—is perhaps the largest concentration of power in the universe, but she did fall in love with Tenchi.

Also, it seems that Noike was continually suffering from visions of Tenchi rescuing a young girl. She exhibited this problem when she first arrived at the Masaki carrot garden and fainted from the experience. It wasn't until the final episode of the third OVA that the cause of these visions was discovered.

It was eventually discovered, after their encounter with Z that Noike had extra cells in her body, cells which had Dr. Clay's personal logo on them. With Tokimi's help, the cells were removed, and they constituted themselves into the girl in Noike's vision. The girl, it turned out, was the female half of Kagato, which had been discarded by the fiend and is the young girl that Tenchi had saved when his mind had drifted into the past after being injured by Z. Clay had later placed his seal (his personal logo) on the female Kagato, which prevented her from completely merging with Noike, which in turn allowed Z to spy on the Masakis through Noike's eyes. Thanks to Washu, Clay's influence was then removed from her, after which the female Kagato re-fused herself permanently to Noike.

However, it has yet to be explained how or why the female half of Kagato resides within Noike to begin with in the first place.

When Noike first met Tenchi she had long hair, but shortly after she moved in she had it cut because it would get in the way of her work. It turned out that she used to have her hair that way before she was adopted by Lady Seto, but Noike claimed on official occasions she would wear a wig. Noike also helps out Sasami with the household chores and is very good at keeping Mihoshi in line. Noike also has some medical training which she used to help Tenchi when he was bedridden with a fever that she herself had secretly inflicted on Tenchi, perhaps using that as a way of ingratiating herself into the family. Noike even bought a truck to help Tenchi with his work in the field as well as use it for other chores. She also offered to give Ayeka and Ryoko lessons in driving the truck.

As a member of Jurai's royal family, Noike is bonded by a third-generation Juraian tree ship, Kyoko. However, the ship is actually a secret design, giving it the power near that of a second-generation ship. This was in response to Ryoko's attack on Jurai 700 years before, where she easily smashed through Jurai's defense network and no ship lower than a second-generation could defend against her. Also, Kyoko has a 'terminal' body which looks like a little green blob, which acts as a wireless connection to the ship at all times. This blob can act jealously sometimes, especially if someone doesn't pay attention to it. This attitude could be attributed to the fact that Kyoko is a highly guarded secret, so she does not get many visitors.

==== Seina Yamada ====
Seina Yamada
- Tenchi Muyo! GXP character
- Voiced by: Shigeru Mogi (Japanese); Tony Oliver (credited as "Raphael Antonio", English)

In-universe information
- Alias: "Lorelei" (by the pirate guilds)
- Nicknames: "Sainan" (calamity, on Earth)
- Relatives: Yoshiko Yamada (sister)
- Royal Tree: Ancient Mecha from Planet in Ep 23-24 (1st Gen) Code Name: Idol

Seina Yamada (山田 西南, Yamada Seina) is a fictional character in the Tenchi Muyo! series and serves as the main character of Tenchi Muyo! GXP, a television spinoff from the original OVAs.

Unlucky boy

Seina Yamada is a good friend of Tenchi Masaki and his parents run a small grocery at the beginning of the series. However, aside from Tenchi, Kiriko Masaki and Kiriko's brother Kai, Seina has very few friends; mostly because he has the worst luck in the universe. Minor disasters often occur in his presence, and anyone near him stays a good distance away from him. Seina's usual (lack of) luck almost ends when a spaceship nearly crashlands on his head at the Masaki residence. Its driver, Galaxy Police Detective Second Class Amane Kaunaq, had meant to present Tenchi a pamphlet for joining the G.P., but mistakenly offers Seina the application instead, under the impression that Tenchi was training the boy.

His family persuades him—via forcibly nabbing his signature and thumb print—to fill out the application, with the hope that Seina would win a prize. When he wakes from sleep what he thinks is the following morning, he finds himself aboard a spaceship, recruited to be the newest member of the G.P. Academy. He also meets Mitoto Kuramitsu, the ditzy mother of Mihoshi and cleaning lady extraordinaire, before discovering his friend Kiriko is also a GP officer. From there, Seina is thrown into a plan to stop the Daluma pirate guild from taking over the galaxy.

When Seina's bad luck was found to have an effect of attracting space pirates, the G.P. capitalized on it by placing Seina in command of one of the Decoy Fleet's newest ships, the Kamidake (which included systems designed by Tenchi's sister Tennyo Masaki). However, when the ship was irreparably damaged as a result of a prolonged chase and multiple battles with space pirates (including Tarant Shank, generally regarded as the most evil of all), Seto then presented Seina with a ship designed by Washu Hakubi, which was named the Kamidake II by Seina. The ship consist of the main ship body and a cabbit, similar to Ryo-Ohki, named Fuku by Seina. Fuku differs from Ryo-Ohki in that Fuku serves as a terminal body and more importantly, the power source for the ship, thus is not able to transform into a ship. However, according to Washu Hakubi, it is possible for Fuku to turn into a cabbit girl like Ryo-Ohki... if Fuku wishes for it as she matures.

Later, the ship became a hybrid, when under Seto Kamiki Jurai's supervision, it was fused together with Kiriko's second generation royal tree Mizuki (enabling it to generate Light Hawk Wings for protection). The main pod, which house the royal tree in a Juraian Royal Tree ship, was used for the fusion.

Battles with pirates and resulting revelations

During the time Seina commanded the Kamidake and Kamidake II, he was earning an equivalent to a fleet commander's salary. However, because he was still a cadet, that money was kept in a special account until he graduated and was given what he would normally earn. The interest the money accumulated, however, was forwarded to his family on Earth. It was so much money that the Yamada family used it to build a huge new home, as well as building a huge supermarket in place of their small grocery. While Seina was visiting Tenchi back on Earth, Amane, Kiriko, Ryoko Balta, and Neju, who was visiting at the time, worked at the Yamada's supermarket, where they were worked until exhausted.

It was later in the series when Seina, who was trying to rescue Fuku from rogue elements of the Galaxy Army, was found by a tribe of Wau, who mistake him for their savior and threw him into an ancient mecha, (which bears a striking reselance to Dual!'s Zinv). Somehow, Seina was able to activate the mecha, which he used to save not only Fuku, but also cabbit clones made from Fuku's cells by Tarant, who had allied himself with the rogue G.A. faction. Angered by this, Seina fought Shank and his allies. But in doing this, the mecha was able to integrate itself to the Kamidake II, which was captured with Fuku. And even more startling, the mecha formed Light Hawk Wings, even though it was not bonded with Mizuki.

Afterward, it was revealed by Emperor Azusa and Empresses Funaho and Misaki that the mecha (now known as Idol) had as its power source a first generation Jurai tree seed, with the seed bonding itself with Seina. As a result, Seina is now third-in-line to the Jurai throne, behind Yosho and Tenchi. Thus, a political marriage between Seina, Amane, Kiriko, Ryoko Balta, and Neju was arranged for political reasons. Seina is initially very disposed against what he thinks is an attempt to force the girls into marrying him, but is later persuaded that they are doing so out of their own free wills.

However, before the ceremony could begin, two incidents occurred. First, Shank had broken into Seina's dressing room, hoping to kill the boy. Luckily, Shank's impatience gets the best of him and Seina was able to subdue him. Also, Seto's ladies-in-waiting – Gyokuren, Hakuren, Karen, and Suiren – who were actually agents of the Renza Federation seeking to use Seina's abilities to rid their home from marauding pirates, kidnapped Seina into their small ship, and began to molest him in a public broadcast to ensure the Renza Alliance's political bond with the Jurai Royal Family. As a result, the four are included into the marriage as well as the crew of the Kamidake.

==== Amane Kaunaq ====
Amane Kaunaq
- Tenchi Muyo! GXP character
- Voiced by: Mariko Suzuki (Japanese); Dorothy Elias-Fahn (credited as Annie Pastrino, English)

In-universe information
- Nickname: "The Zero Goddess"
- Relatives: Seina Yamada (Husband); Yoshiko Yamada (Sister-In-Law)

Amane Kaunaq (雨音・カウナック, Amane Kaunakku) is a fictional character in the anime series Tenchi Muyo! GXP: Galaxy Police Transporter.

Background

Originally the galaxy's greatest supermodel, Amane Kaunaq felt disgusted and burned-out from it and left the business to become part of the Galaxy Police. She was very good at her job (even earning the nickname 'the Zero Goddess' because of her avoidance of pirate encounters). Amane was in line to gain a promotion to Detective 1st Class when, after landing her spaceship in the lake outside Tenchi Masaki's home, she gave Seina Yamada an application to the G.P. Academy. Previously, in episode 18 of the third Tenchi OVA, she had contacted Tenchi, through her friend Mihoshi Kuramitsu, about his entering the G.P. Academy. When she saved Seina from drowning, she had erroneously assumed that Tenchi was training Seina, and gave the boy an application to the Academy as well, forgetting a regulation that prohibits citizens of underdeveloped planets from entering (however, Tenchi was considered because of his blood connection with the Jurai Royal Family).

As a result of her mistake, Amane's promotion was placed on-hold and she ended up assigned as an instructor in the G.P. Academy, along with Kiriko Masaki and her old childhood friend Seiryo Tennan. Despite her previous friendly relationship with him as a child, Amane has developed a deep hatred towards Seiryo due to his silly antics and overbearing tenacity and because he tried to flip up her skirt when they were children. Amane has demonstrated that she wants nothing to do with Seiryo, and even beaten him up a few times when Seiryo tried to make a move on her or even slightly annoyed her.

After Seina would receive the body enhancing modifications he needed to keep up with the other students, Seina moved into Amane's private home, along with Kiriko and Erma (secretly, Erma was in fact the space pirate Ryoko Balta, who was spying on Seina).

Amane's life would soon be revolving around Seina as the G.P. utilizes the boy's fantastic amount of bad luck, which seems to attract space pirates, in a plan to bring peace throughout the galaxy.

Though seen as more flirtious of the group, Amane truly cares about Seina. When he was injured by a high flying Seiryo, she immediately ran to Seina. She loves him very much and is one of the few who openly fights for his affection and attention.

Trying to help Seina

Like Kiriko, Ryoko and Neju, Amane was later engaged to wed Seina in a political marriage. However, before the ceremony could begin, Seto's ladies-in-waiting, who were actually agents of the Renza Federation seeking to use Seina's abilities to rid their home from marauding pirates, kidnapped Seina into their small ship, and began to molest him in a public broadcast to ensure their non-Galactic Union organization's survival. As a result, the four are apparently included into the marriage, or at least the crew of the Kamidake II.

Family connections

Amane's family happens to be the head of one of the premiere fashion houses in the galaxy. Amane mostly entered the Galaxy Police to spite her tradition-bound father, who still kept in contact with his daughter despite her entry into the G.P.. Amane, later on, would briefly re-enter the modeling business when her family sponsored a G.P. fashion show. It was only after seeing Amane's skill and abilities during a live-fire demonstration of the latest G.P. battle gear that Amane's father conceded that his daughter had made the right choice... but still held out she would return to modeling.

Amane's family is also friends of the powerful Kuramitsu family of planet Seniwa, and Amane is acquainted with both Mihoshi and her brother Misao Kuramitsu. In fact, Amane had trained Misao, and she still refers to the boy as "Rookie".

==== Kiriko Masaki ====
Kiriko Masaki Jurai
- Tenchi Muyo! GXP character
- Voiced by: Kumi Sakuma (Japanese); Wendee Lee (English)

In-universe information
- Relatives: Kai Masaki (brother); Seina Yamada (Husband); Yoshiko Yamada (Sister-In-Law)
- Royal Tree: Miyuki (2nd Gen)

Kiriko Masaki (正木 霧恋, Masaki Kiriko) is a fictional character in the anime series Tenchi Muyo! GXP: Galaxy Police Transporter.

Background

Seina's childhood friend, Kiriko Masaki would often be tending to the many injuries that Seina would suffer from his bad luck. She cares for Seina deeply and would fight to protect him from further harm. Even her younger brother Kai would help out Seina in repairing (or otherwise constructing from new) the bicycles that would be wrecked because of Seina's bad luck.

What was not known about Kiriko was that she actually has blood ties to the Jurai royal family... a small tie, but it exists (she's also older than she appears... she's 33, but looks 21). Even Kai was unaware of their connection and wouldn't find out until Kiriko's wedding.

For a time because of this, Kiriko was one of Seto Kamiki Jurai's ladies-in-waiting, and that connection helped Kiriko to gain a position with the Galaxy Police's immigration department, where she worked when she wasn't on Earth.

Trying to help Seina

It was while Kiriko was working in the G.P.'s immigration department is when she found out that Seina had enrolled in the G.P.. Immediately, she pleaded to the boy without success for him to leave. Soon afterward, she was assigned to the G.P. Academy, along with Amane Kaunaq. During Seina's training, she had moved into Amane's house at the Academy along with Erma, although it was more to keep an eye on Amane and keep her from making a move on Seina.

It was later on in the series that Kiriko began to feel inadequate compared to the other women in Seina's life – Amane, Ryoko Balta, and more recently Neju Na Melmas. It was after an experiment using Seto's ship Mikagami that her life would be changed. In a ceremony witnessed by Seto's husband Utsutsumi and Emperor Azusa, Kiriko was bonded to a second-generation Jurai tree, thus giving her the name Kiriko Masaki Jurai (柾木 霧恋 樹雷, Masaki Kiriko Jurai). The tree's name is Mizuki, and now aided Fuku in powering the Kamidake II, the ship she shared command with Seina and Amane.

Like Amane, Ryoko and Neju, Kiriko was later engaged to wed Seina in a political marriage. However, before the ceremony could begin, Seto's ladies-in-waiting, who were actually agents of the Renza Federation seeking to use Seina's abilities to rid their home from marauding pirates, kidnapped Seina into their small ship, and began to molest him in a public broadcast to ensure their non-Galactic Union organization's survival. As a result, the four are apparently included into the marriage, or at least the crew of the Kamidake II.

Through it all, Kiriko loves Seina. She wished for him to return to earth at one point when she was generally worried about Seina being in space. She believes that it is because she sees him as a burden but while talking to Airi, she soon realized that there was a difference between seeing someone as a burden and loving someone to where one would do anything to protect them. Kiriko truly loves Seina.

G.P. training

As a G.P. officer, Kiriko has access to much of the G.P.'s standard complement of weapons and training in their use, as well as her Jurai strength. In one episode, she demonstrated the use of one of these – a bodysuit that featured cloaking technology, which enabled her to attack with complete surprise. Also in the heat of battle, Kiriko tends to concentrate solely on battle and not on the environment around her – which was why when she approached Tarant Shank – covered in the blood of her previous opponents – she became surprised and then saddened to find that Seina was terrified of her.

==== Ryoko Balta ====
Ryoko Balta
- Tenchi Muyo! GXP character
- Voiced by: Japanese; Aya Hisakawa (Ryoko); Nina Kumagaya (Erma); English; Barbara Goodson (Ryoko); Rebecca Forstadt (a.k.a. Reba West, Erma)

In-universe information
- Alias: Erma
- Species: Balta
- Relatives: Seina Yamada (Husband); Yoshiko Yamada (Sister-in-Law)

Ryoko Balta (リョーコ・バルタ, Ryōko Baruta) is a fictional character in the Tenchi Muyo! spinoff series: Tenchi Muyo! GXP: Galaxy Police Transporter.

Background

Although she named herself after Ryoko Hakubi, Ryoko Balta is not as bloodthirsty as that infamous space pirate was rumored to be. Even though she was a member of the Daluma pirate guild, Ryoko Balta is an educated and cultured pirate. She is well-versed in many customs from other planets, including the Japanese Tea Ceremony. Her beauty is such that some male Galaxy Police members would leave their posts to be with her (it is rumored that there are many "Ryoko Balta Fan Clubs" in some G.P. posts).

Within the pirate guild, however, Ryoko had few friends, and was hostile to Tarant Shank, the guild's vilest member. However, she is also a great friend of another of the guild's members, Kyo Komachi.

Ryoko Balta is also a shape-shifter, and she often used this power to infiltrate Galaxy Police posts to gain information. One of her favorite forms is that of Erma, a Wau Galaxy Police clerk who works for Airi Masaki, the head of the G.P.'s Jurai office and the grandmother of Tenchi Masaki.

Meeting Seina

Ryoko Balta first met Seina Yamada when her ship attacked the transport carrying him to the Galaxy Police Academy. Three of the crew – Alan, Barry and Cohen – forced a surrender when they found out Ryoko was on board. However, when she met Seina, Ryoko was taken in with him and allowed the transport to leave. She even deliberately failed to add Seina's name in the Daluma Guild's enemies list.

Ryoko later met Seina again, only this time in her role as Erma. She, along with Amane Kaunaq and Kiriko Masaki, moved in with Seina at Amane's home at the Academy.

Ryoko's capture

Shank forced Ryoko to participate in a plan of his by imprisoning the families of her crew and threatened to kill them unless she killed Seina Yamada. Using her disguise as Erma, Ryoko accompanied Seina on a shopping trip at the G.P. Academy. But when she finally confronted Seina, the boy gave her a present – a simple star pendant.

Overcome with guilt and shame, Ryoko dropped her disguise and confessed to Seina. She then turned the gun she planned to use to kill Seina on herself. But before she could pull the trigger, Amane Kaunaq and Kiriko Masaki (who were jealously following Ryoko (Erma) and Seina to keep an eye on them) barged in and Seina stopped her. Ryoko was later captured by Airi; it seemed that a short time ago, Airi found out that Erma was really Ryoko but did not have the evidence to prove it.

At the same time, Kyo Komachi (with secret help from Airi Masaki) managed to free the families of Ryoko's crew. At the same time, the families took with them a second-generation Juraian tree-seed, which the Daluma Guild had procured in the hopes of discovering its secrets.

Life after capture

However, as per procedure, Ryoko Balta's DNA was listed in the Galaxy Police's database, and in the process, it was discovered that her DNA was disguised. The reason for this was that, in fact, she was the last heir to the Balta Guild, which stands to become a member of the Galactic Union. With help from Seto, she was released as a subordinate of Seina. After the group made it to Jurai, Seto revealed Ryoko's past to her... and Ryoko even got to meet her grandfather, the ruler of the Balta Guild. But even though she was invited to come back home, Ryoko chose to stay with Seina.

Ryoko then became a member of the newest ship in the Galaxy Police's fleet – the Kamidake II, which was created by Washu Hakubi. Mostly out of love for the boy, Ryoko, along with Amane, Kiriko – and later the childlike former priestess Neju Na Melmas – fought alongside Seina, which included rescuing Seina and Fuku when a rogue faction of the Galaxy Army – who were aiding Shank – tried to gain the secrets to Fuku's power.

Later on, Ryoko, as well as Amane, Kiriko and Neju, were placed in an arranged political marriage with Seina, although they all assured him that this was with their full consent. However, before the ceremony could begin, Seto's ladies-in-waiting, who were actually agents of the Renza Federation seeking to use Seina's abilities to rid their home from marauding pirates, kidnapped Seina into their small ship, and began to molest him in a public broadcast to ensure their non-Galactic Union organization's survival. As a result, the four are apparently included into the marriage, or at least the crew of the Kamidake II.

==== Neju Na Melmas ====
Neju Na Melmas
- Tenchi Muyo! GXP character
- Voiced by: Nana Mizuki (Japanese); Sandy Fox (a.k.a. Marie Danielle, English)

In-universe information
- Species: Melmas
- Relatives: Seina Yamada (Husband), Yoshiko Yamada (Sister-in-Law)

Neju Na Melmas (ネージュ・ナ・メルマス, Nēju Na Merumasu) is a fictional character in the anime series Tenchi Muyo! GXP: Galaxy Police Transporter.

Background

Although she looks like a ten-year-old girl, Neju is actually a 3000-year-old high priestess and spiritual leader of her planet. Politically savvy as well as extremely cunning, she had countless assassination attempts thwarted through body doubles and her great powers. Neju is an exceptionally powerful telepath, able to affect movement and persuade others through intimidation.

Meeting Seina

Neju first met Seina Yamada on Jurai, after Seina found out that his ship, the Kamidake, had suffered fatal damage following a battle with Tarant Shank. She had accompanied Seina, Amane Kaunaq, Kiriko Masaki and Ryoko Balta to the G.P. Academy on board their new ship, the Kamidake II, presented by Seto Kamiki Jurai... with strict orders from the G.P. not to use their weaponry along the way.

From the first moment she set foot on the ship, Neju was almost inseparable from Seina, which caused quite a bit of jealousy between the girls. She was even present when, during a pirate attack, Fuku was hatched.

Confrontation

It was while the girls were monitoring a visit to the ship's holodeck between Seina, Neju and Fuku that Kiriko discovered the truth. She had seen around Neju's neck a golden necklace which identified her as the high priestess of Melmas. Armed with this knowledge, the girls went to confront Neju, but were partially paralyzed by her as a show of her powers. But everything was patched-up when Neju gave a little encouragement to Fuku when a major pirate attack was launched by the ship.

When the Kamidake II finally arrived at the G.P. Academy, they learned from Seto that the pirate attack were more than likely an assassination attempt against Neju. She went on to explain that Neju was near the point where she has to select her successor and would soon enter a secular life, which would normally require her to remain on Melmas for five years. But since she would still face death by enemies she gained during her tenure, it was decided that Neju should enter the G.P. Academy as a student.

Neju on Earth

During a brief stopover on Earth, the Kamidake II crew was surprised that Neju had shown up at Seina's new home (built from the interest accrued from an account of his pay and sent to his family). She had a body double stand-in for her so that she could travel to Earth, mostly to find out about Seina's life on Earth.

Neju even helped out Amane, Kiriko and Ryoko at the Yamada's new supermarket while Seina and Fuku visited Tenchi, mainly to talk to Washu about Fuku's origins. They had to leave Earth in a hurry when the Daluma Guild launched their "Good Luck" fleet as a counter to Seina's bad luck.

A life with Seina

Like Amane, Kiriko and Ryoko, Neju was engaged to wed Seina in a political marriage after the defeat of a rogue faction of the Galaxy Army (aided by Shank). However, before the ceremony could begin, Seto's ladies-in-waiting, who were actually agents of the Renza Federation seeking to use Seina's abilities to rid their home from marauding pirates, kidnapped Seina into their small ship, and began to molest him in a public broadcast to ensure their non-Galactic Union organization's survival. As a result, the four are apparently included into the marriage, or at least the crew of the Kamidake II.

Neju's feelings towards Seina are very ambiguous. On one hand she has stated that she wishes to marry him and also interested in how she would look in a few more years. On the other hand, she was shown to be more as an observer of Seina and how he allowed her to be the girl she could not on Melmas. Either way, Seina has shown tremendous concern and affection for Neju which she seems to reciprocate to a certain degree.

==== Seiryo Tennan ====
Seiryō Tennan
- Tenchi Muyō! character
- Voiced by: Japanese; Mitsuaki Madono; English; John DeMita (OVA); Richard Cansino (Toonami version; the redub was necessary due to Seiryo's original English voice sounding too effeminate); Kirk Thornton (GXP)

Seiryō Tennan (天南 静竜, Tennan Seiryō) is a fictional character in the anime Tenchi Muyo!, first introduced in the second OVA series as a "villainous" annoyance and much later as a main character and general nuisance in the spinoff Tenchi Muyo! GXP.

Tenchi Muyō! Ryō-Ohki

When Juraian Emperor Azusa visits Earth and attempts to bring his daughters Ayeka and Sasami back home, they will have none of it, wanting to remain there with Tenchi. Still sore over Tenchi's grandfather (and the emperor's own son) Yōshō abandoning Jurai to marry an Earthling, Azusa begrudgingly approves, but only if Tenchi could defeat his chosen fiancé for Ayeka in a duel. This "worthy suitor" was Seiryō Tennan, son of one of Jurai's wealthiest families. Flashy with an exaggerated sense of style (he rigs his own light show and cherry blossoms for special effects), Seiryō sees the events from a skewed point of view, believing the princesses to be confined in a dump much worse than a prison cell. He takes it upon himself to "liberate" Ayeka from her forced labor and thereby the barbarous Tenchi, believing it to be his, or rather, "any civilized person's" moral duty.

Boastful, Seiryō thinks it would be a wise idea for Tenchi to concede – not wanting to "bully the weak" – and beseeches him not to worry as he won't be using his full power. Some time before the duel was to begin, the group makes bets on whom they think will win: the majority (including Seiryo's prospective bride and in-laws) side with Tenchi, Azusa favors Seiryō in "less than a minute", and Washū places an unorthodox bet on Mihoshi, who wasn't even present at the time.

Washū emerged as the winner of the bet. Mihoshi's shuttle crash lands in the Masaki family lake before the match begins, swamping the deck of the house and leaving a dazed Seiryō to be washed back into the water- Tenchi, on the other hand, was waterlogged but otherwise unfazed. As a result, Tenchi won by default, Seiryō losing his chance at arranged marriage.

Tenchi Muyo! GXP

His "defeat" would be so humiliating for Seiryō that he would develop a personal hatred for all Earthlings, a grudge which would continue on into Tenchi Muyō! GXP. He holds a teacher's position at the Galaxy Police Academy, and immediately develops a distaste for the human Seina Yamada when he becomes a cadet.

Seina becomes Seiryō's nemesis, constantly foiling his endless idiotic plots for revenge (mostly through Seina's streak of bad luck). Having rebounded from his missed shot at Ayeka, Seiryō becomes infatuated again by childhood acquaintance Amane, despite being frequently and violently rejected; her attachment to Seina only serves to deepen his hatred for the young recruit, so much so that in Episode 6, Seriyō holds up the necessary body augmentation that Seina needed to at least survive life at the academy. However, Mikami Kuramitsu found out, and assigned Seriyō to clean toilets... with her niece Mitoto supervising.

Seiryō is brash and overconfident, often severely embarrassing himself through acts of sheer incompetence. However, he is also an accomplished fighter, and is quite proficient with a lightsword.

After Amane allowed him to be captured by the enemy in Episode 9, Seiryō learns during Episode 18 the Tennan family has signed a supply contract with the Daluma pirate guild. Seiryō follows his father's orders to assist the pirates and becomes the captain of the Daluma guild's anti-Seina Good Luck Fleet. In a stunning display of idiocy, he names his flagship Unko, which could mean "Luck Bringer" in written Japanese ... but also translates as "excrement" or "poop" when spoken aloud.

After fighting the G.P. ship Kamidake II to a standstill twice, Lady Seto decides to resolve the whole situation by issuing a challenge to Seriyō in Seina's name to an official duel. However, during the duel when Seina slips on a piece of candy, his Shock Baton gets caught in Seiryō's belt and loosens it completely, causing Seriyō's pants to fall down and exposing his red fundoshi (loincloth) and costing Seriyō another match via embarrassment.

At the end of the series, Seiryō works as the head waiter at a space station behind Earth's moon, where Seina's wedding was being held, as the station was owned by the Tennan family. While there, he encounters space pirate and former captor Kyō Komachi, and proposes to her after revealing that it was her birthday.

==== Tarant Shank ====
Tarant Shank
- Tenchi Muyo! GXP character
- Voiced by: Yuki Matsuda (Japanese); Kim Strauss (English)

Tarant Shank (タラント・シャンク, Taranto Shanku) is a fictional character in the Tenchi Muyo! anime series, and is currently exclusive to Tenchi Muyo! GXP, a television spinoff from the original OVAs.

Never-ending vendetta

Shank is a member of the dreaded Daluma Guild, but the terror the organization holds over the galaxy is nothing compared to that wreaked by Shank. He is bloodthirsty and cruel, feared by both the Galaxy Police and his peers. He is captain of the Daidalos, and no prisoner brought aboard his ship tends to live very long. Though sadistic enough to pass up an easy kill to instill more terror in his prey, Tarant is a survivalist and cowardly at heart, using others (even his own subordinates) as a shield when plans go awry and he has to escape.

Shank has a grudge against GP officer Seina Yamada before ever meeting him, namely because his "incompetent old man" was captured in Seina's first great lure before he actually arrived at the GP Academy, tarnishing the Shank family name. He attacks a destroyer transporting Seina and amuses himself by stalking the boy while killing GP officers. Before Shank can decide what torture to visit upon him, Kiriko Masaki steps in to save him, allowing Seina the chance to stab Shank in the arm and escape. The pirate backs down for now, vowing to hunt down and kill Seina for the shame he's brought himself. His later plans to take Seina's family hostage fail after Tenchi and the others get involved, and Ryoko Balta proves useless when she cares too much for the boy to act as an assassin. The Daidalos then leads a small fleet into a direct confrontation with Seina while en route to Jurai, but Shank is forced to retreat after coming under fire from Ryo-Ohki.

Shank has all passengers aboard a commuter ship killed, leaving a bio-droid as a sole "survivor" to be recovered by Seina's Kamidake II. The infiltration succeeds and the ship's crew is captured, with the K2 being swallowed whole by the whale-like Daidalos. Shank taunts Kiriko and Seina, gloating before returning the boy's knife to him through the chest. However, the setup itself was a ruse by the GP, with the supposed prisoners being holographic dupes created by Washu. Off-balance, the Daidalos is mortally crippled when K2 opens fire from within the docking bay and explodes as its captives break their way out of its hull. Tarant survives the attack, though the upper left portion of his torso and face (including his left eye) are irreparably damaged. Scarred now with numerous metal cybernetic accoutrements, he falls further from grace after a loss to Seiryo with light swords, upending his chances of commanding the newest flagship of the Daluma fleet.

Striking out on his own

Shank was not present when the Daluma Guild was dissolved and incorporated into the Balta Guild, instead forming an alliance with a rogue faction within the Galaxy Army. They abduct Fuku and the Kamidake II in order to learn the ship's secrets, with Tarant growing ever impatient that his scientists cannot simply dissect the cabbit instead of producing imperfect clones (it is implied that he tortured the helpless cabitt clones for his own amusement). He's eager to fight Seina again when the boy storms his lab to take Fuku back, but Tarant is ill-prepared for the young man's rage; Yamada's mecha, reacting to Seina's fury, attacks and nearly crushes Shank, who though injured manages to flee.

Bruised but not yet beaten, Shank boards the rebuilt Daidalos, commanding his and the rogue GA fleet to concentrate all firepower towards Seina, conspiring to kill him and obliterate the planet to cover their tracks. The mecha is not destroyed, however, instead blocking the combined firepower and then teleporting in front of the two fleets to continue its own attack. Terrified now, Shank sacrifices his own ships and men to buy time, ordering his crew to jump into hyperspace to escape. The ship successfully warps away just as Seina's mech comes within arm's reach, but as Shank curses the young officer for robbing him of whatever accomplishments and ambitions he might have had, the pirate is horrified to see the mecha's hand (aided with the power of the Light Hawk Wings from the Juraian tree seed powering it) reach into hyperspace to pull the Daidalos back out. The ship is crushed and dissolved to nothingness, seemingly taking its captain along with it.

Shank makes a final attempt on Seina's life on the boy's wedding day, masquerading first as Mitoto Kuramitsu to gain access to the wedding space station and then as a butler to catch him unawares. Half-mad from further cybernetic modification, Shank is fixated only on revenge and moves to slash the GP officer with Seina's own knife, promising to kill Kiriko next. However, his attack with a metallic knee-spike damages the floor and the wiring beneath; Seina activates sealant gel that traps Shank in place, and a powerful super-kick from Seina causes Shank's trapped metallic leg to snap off. The automated devices on board detect the sparks coming from Tarant's damaged leg and envelop the pirate in sealant, and no amount of curses or screams of reprisal can keep him from being fully immobilized and captured.

=== Main characters introduced in Tenchi Muyo! In Love films ===
==== Kain ====
Kain
- Tenchi Muyo! character
- Voiced by: Ryūzaburō Ōtomo (Japanese); Michael Scott Ryan (English)

Kain (禍因, Kain) is a fictional character who is the main villain of the first Tenchi Muyo! movie, Tenchi the Movie: Tenchi Muyo in Love. He is an incredibly powerful entity who is considered a Super A-Class criminal by the Galaxy Police.

One hundred years before, Kain was on the loose, destroying hundreds of starships and thousands of lives. It was only after a combined effort with the Galaxy Police and the supreme sacrifice of the Jurai emperor, that Kain was finally captured and locked away in the subspace room of G.P.H.Q.

However, one hundred years later, Kain broke out of the subspace room, destroyed G.P.H.Q. (but not after getting off a warning), and retreated twenty-six years in the past, where he hopes to kill Achika Masaki, which would eliminate Tenchi and affect the futures of Ryoko, Ayeka, Sasami, Ryo-Ohki, Mihoshi, and Kiyone.

Despite being said to be immensely powerful, Kain was sealed up rather easily by one of Washu's creations in a sub-space reality. Though he dragged Achika and Nobuyuki in with him, he was forced to show his draconian face when Tenchi, Ryoko and Ayeka entered his prison-world to save Achika. Though Kain easily overpowered them, he was in turn destroyed when Achika awakened her Jurai powers and used the Tenchi-ken – which became a naginata – to bisect Kain and end his reign of terror. Kain's remains were destroyed by Kiyone with the Dimensional Cannon which destroyed the subspace that Kain was in after Achika barely broke away from Kain during their escape.

==== Yugi ====
Yugi
- Tenchi Muyo! character
- Voiced by: Akiko Yajima (Japanese); Debi Derryberry (English)

In-universe information
- Species: Juraian (artificial mutant creation)

Yugi (幽戯, Yūgi) is a fictional character in the anime Tenchi Muyo!, the main antagonist from the television series Tenchi in Tokyo. Her appearance is that of a young blonde girl with a red and black striped headdress and large spiked armor that hovers around her.

Throughout much of the series, her plans remain in shadow, and all the viewer sees of her much of the time is her watching a group of floating crystals which represent the Masaki Family, while commenting on the events of the episodes. She has three henchmen: Hotsuma, Tsugaru, and Matori, who do almost all of her work for her.

Background

Yugi is actually from the planet Jurai. She was a mutant with amazing powers, and was able to create anything with her mind. Yugi was a lonely young girl, and created large demonic friends to play with. While they played, however, they accidentally ravaged Jurai, proving to be an unstoppable destructive force. Finally, Empress Hinase, head of the Jurai royal family, led a force to confront her. They destroyed the creatures as Yugi pleaded for them not to destroy her friends. Finally, she was captured, and imprisoned in a stone tomb. As the doors closed, she cried and screamed that she was afraid of the dark. Empress Hinase pitied the innocent girl, but knew that this was the only choice she had.

The tomb was launched, set to drift in the most remote parts of space. Somehow, it crashed on Earth and was buried, until an earthquake broke it open 3,500 years later. Yugi was released, but she was now a much different person than the innocent child from millennia before. She had become dark and warped, deciding to use her powers to change the earth into a world of her own.

During the series

Her only opposition was Earth's planet guardian, a young boy named Tenchi. His weapon, and the one thing that could stop her, was a large sword created by a small cluster of crystals, which had been given one to each member of the new extended Masaki family. Once Tenchi moves to Tokyo, Yugi creates a new persona, a reflection or shadow of herself at his age, named Sakuya Kumashiro. Sakuya is her main tool as she splits up the girls so that the crystals will be scattered, weakening them and not allowing Tenchi to form the sword.

Her plan changed when she met Sasami. Yugi created another new persona, this one the same as the young girl she once was. This Yugi would play with Sasami, who was the only true friend she ever knew. When Yugi attacked the Masaki shrine, her other side went off playing with Sasami so she did not have to see the slaughter, which led to Yugi not having the energy to win the battle.

As her plan nears its end, she meets with Sasami, and the two play once more. She asks Sasami to come with her to her home, but Sasami says no, telling Yugi that they're just little girls, and much too young to live on their own. Yugi becomes angry at this rejection, and disappears, a sight which frightens Sasami. Sasami tells her sister Ayeka what happened to her friend Yugi, and Ayeka recognizes the name as the name of the one who attacked the Masaki shrine.

The final fight

Yugi's henchman Matori kidnaps Sasami and traps her in a large crystal just before her plan finally comes to fruition. The world freezes in time, and the only ones safe are the girls and Tenchi, whose crystals protected them. Tenchi goes to stop Yugi, but is suddenly placed in a dream world where he can live with Sakuya forever. Sakuya, however persuades Tenchi to go after Yugi, and he breaks free of the illusion. As he readies to confront Yugi, the others, including Sasami, are instantly transported to him.

Yugi tells Sasami that she is making a world just for them, and, her voice breaking, asks her to join her. Sasami remembers their first meeting, and asks how Yugi could have done such atrocities, rejecting her proposal. Matori tells her to kill them all, but is herself destroyed by the brokenhearted Yugi. In a fit of rage Yugi declares she doesn't need friends or anyone, and puts an end to all of existence with the exception of Tenchi and the girls, who were protected by Ayeka's shield, before withdrawing into her inner sanctum.

Tenchi reunites the crystals and forms his sword, going after Yugi. A panicked Yugi screams that she doesn't want to be buried again and begins sending creatures to stop him, but Ryoko, Ayeka, Mihoshi, and Kiyone take out the guards, along with the other obstacles put in Tenchi's way. He makes it to the inner sanctum, finding himself in the room where Yugi spent much of the series. He finds a crying Yugi charging an attack, begging for Tenchi to leave her alone, and not lock her back up in the dark. Tenchi slices her attack in half, and Yugi begins screaming hysterically, which can be heard by all the others.

Suddenly, she is brought back to reality as Tenchi, who having dropped the sword, grabs her and slaps her. He gently lets her down, as her spiked armor falls from her. The two embrace and Yugi, crying, tells him of her fears of being alone. Tenchi tells her that all she needed was to come to the Masaki house, and she'd never worry about being alone again. As he comforts her, her world slips away, and all returns to normal.

Yugi chooses to be put into a sleep until she grows up and can control her powers better. She is put in the cave near the Masaki Shrine, and Sasami visits her every evening, telling her the events of the day. Ryoko hypothesises in the end that, since Sakuya was a reflection of Yugi, Yugi will grow up to be Sakuya, creating a bit more competition for Tenchi's affection.

== Supporting characters ==
=== Masaki Family ===
==== Katsuhito Masaki ====
Yōshō Masaki Jurai
- Tenchi Muyō! character
- Created by: Masaki Kajishima
- Voiced by: Japanese; Takeshi Aono (Katsuhito/Genjuro); Takehito Koyasu (Yōshō); Kunihiko Yasui (Binpachi); Masamichi Ōta (Child Yōshō in MnE); Ken Uo (Ryo-ohki 4th series); English; Jay Hopper (1st Katsuhito); Bob Papenbrook (credited as John Smallberries in GXP, 2nd Katsuhito, 3rd Yōshō); Matt K. Miller (1st Yōshō); Richard Cansino (2nd Yōshō, TMIL2); Barbara Goodson (Child Yosho in MnE)

In-universe information
- Alias: Katsuhito Masaki
- Royal Tree: Funaho (1st Gen)

Katsuhito Masaki (柾木 勝仁, Masaki Katsuhito) is a fictional character in the anime Tenchi Muyo!.

OVA

In the OVA, Katsuhito, also known as Yōshō Masaki Jurai (柾木 遙照 樹雷, Masaki Yōshō Jurai), fled Jurai over 700 years ago to "retire" on Earth. He was once the greatest swordsman on Jurai. Currently Katsuhito is a Shinto priest who is not only training Tenchi to be a Shinto priest but also training him in Jurai swordsmanship. Yōshō had a marriage arranged with half-sister Ayeka, but left. At the time, not all Juraians liked the idea of mixed blood heritages (he is part human, on his mother's side) and he used Ryōko's attack as an excuse to slip away to Earth. In the OVA, he expected that Ayeka was trying to track him down and arranged for Tenchi to fight Ryōko so that his grandson would go in his place to Jurai. Although he had dropped contact with his parents, he was still in touch with Seto (through whom he was able to send Tennyo and Kiriko, among others, into space via the Galaxy Police) although her collusion in his plans is not known. While he appears to be of advanced age, his gray hair and lined face are merely an illusion hiding his true form, which he shows to only a select few (such as his mother).

Yōshō's tree is called Funaho, after his mother. It is a rare first-generation tree spawned directly from Tsunami-no-fune and thus one of the most powerful Juraian tree ships (not including its 0th generation 'mother' Tsunami-no-fune and on par with Azusa's Kirito which is also 1st Generation). It is currently rooted on Earth and so at present cannot take ship form. However, the tree has not lost its power. This was because, during his battle with Ryōko, Yōshō had stolen the three gems originally bonded by Washu and bonded them to the pommel of Tenchi-ken (which was created from the wood of the Tsunami tree). As a result, the gems had supplied power to the tree for over 700 years, countering the usual consequences of a Juraian Space Tree taking root and prolonging his lifespan.

He is in a common law marriage with Airi and has two children from that union called Minaho and Kiyone. He has married one other woman in the past after crashing to Earth (named Kasumi, his cousin and Funaho's niece), and his descendants along that line include Nobuyuki, and Kiriko.

Tenchi Universe

In the Tenchi Universe continuity, Katsuhito is still known as Yōshō and is related to Jurai's royal family and is the greatest swordsman who has ever lived, but is not a close relative to Ayeka or Sasami. While Ayeka and Sasami are from a distant branch family, Yōshō and Tenchi are from the main line. This makes Tenchi the direct heir to the throne of Jurai.

In the movie Tenchi Forever! The Movie (Tenchi in Love 2), it was revealed that, after he defeated Kagato for the first time, he left Jurai along with his lover, Haruna, but tragically, she died upon arriving to Earth. After he arrived, he fell in love with a girl named Itsuki Masaki, who would become Achika Masaki's mother.

Unlike the OVA continuity, where Katsuhito had retained his youthful appearance throughout his seven centuries on earth and simply chooses to appear as an elderly man, Yōshō of the "Tenchi Universe" continuity truly is as elderly as he appears.

Tenchi in Tokyo

In Tenchi in Tokyo, Katsuhito is not part of any line to Jurai's Royal Family. He is just the wise guardian of the Masaki Shrine. He also doesn't display any kind of special powers in the series. Near the finale, when Washu needed to go to Tenchi to warn him about Yugi, Katsuhito went with her. It is there that Katsuhito revealed to Tenchi that the Masaki family are Earth's protectors that secretly battle against any enemy that is a threat to the Earth and the gems that Tenchi received from his late mother are in fact the power that had been granted to them by the gods of the Earth that repels all evil.

Later, after Yugi began to freeze time and after Tenchi went to fight her, Katsuhito explained to Washu that Tenchi won't kill Yugi as he had preferred to be a kindhearted person which is why Washu and the other women from space are allowed to live on Earth in the Masaki Shrine. Katsuhito explained that through this method it enables for Tenchi to be true to himself and be able to fulfill his Planet Guardian duties. This proved to be true when Tenchi chose to spare Yugi.

Pretty Sammy

In Magical Project S (Pretty Samy TV), Katsuhito and Yōshō appear as Genjūrō Hagakure (葉隠 源十郎, Hagakure Genjūrō) and Binpachi Hagakure (葉隠 敏八, Hagakure Binpachi), respectively, in episode 10. Genjūrō Hagakure is the leader of the ninja village theme park and is working to prevent Nobuyuki Onijigoku from turning it to a wild west theme park but had become bedridden. Binpachi is Genjūrō's foolish grandson who had chosen to go over Onijigoku's side as he felt that cowboys were cooler than ninja. At the end, Binpachi chose to go back to his family's side after his grandfather protected him from getting shot by Gunman Girl, and Binpachi responded by distracting Gunman Girl with his Ninja skills until Pretty Sammy destroyed her. Genjūrō then was able to convince a depressed Onijigoku that they could convert the theme park into a mixture of the wild west and ninjas. But to help teach Onijigoku a lesson for what he had tried to do, Genjūrō had him and his assistant bound to the entrance of the wild west park as punishment.

==== Nobuyuki Masaki ====
Nobuyuki Masaki
- Tenchi Muyo character
- Voiced by: Japanese; Takeshi Aono; Toshiyuki Morikawa (young Nobuyuki, TMiL); Katsuyuki Konishi (Ryo-ohki OVA 4); English; Jay Hopper (1st); Bob Papenbrook (2nd); Andrew Philpot (young Nobuyuki, TMiL)

In-universe information
- Relatives: Kazumi the Older (Grandmother, deceased OAV); Kasumi the Younger (sister OAV); Kiyone Masaki (first wife, deceased; OAV); Rea Masaki (second wife; OAV); Achika Masaki (wife, deceased; Tenchi Universe and Tenchi in Tokyo); Katsuhito Masaki (father-in-law); Airi Masaki (mother-in-law); Tenchi Masaki (son by Kiyone); Tennyo Masaki (daughter by Kiyone); Mayuka (granddaughter - 2nd movie); Kenshi Masaki (son by Rea); Taro Masaki (Nephew; OAV)

Nobuyuki Masaki (柾木 信幸, Masaki Nobuyuki) is a fictional character in the anime Tenchi Muyo!.

Nobuyuki Masaki is Tenchi's father, and works in the city as an architect. Although he has shown that he is less responsible than his son, Nobuyuki does care deeply for Tenchi, and after losing his wife, Nobuyuki has worked hard to raise him. He is also a Peeping Tom and tries to encourage Tenchi to be more active and not as shy towards women.

Tenchi Muyo! Ryo-Ohki

In Tenchi Muyo! Ryo-Ohki, Nobuyuki is only a minor character, a descendant of Yosho (Katsuhito) through his first wife (at one point he refers to Katsuhito as 'grandfather', which would mean that he's also Katsuhito's grandson, but through his first wife, Kasumi (Nobuyuki's real age is revealed as being around 140-years-old, meaning that he may be Katsuhito's youngest grandson through his first wife)). Originally, he and Tenchi lived in the city where he would work and Tenchi would go to school. But after Ryoko was awakened, Nobuyuki saw Tenchi with her and was surprised that Tenchi had a girl in his room. Nobuyuki attempted to record their private session, but then Ayeka arrived and Nobuyuki was miniaturized along with the house by Ryoko while escaping from Ayeka.

Afterwards, the house was permanently relocated next to the Masaki family shrine and Nobuyuki eventually moved back into the city living in an apartment with an old friend of the family, Rea Masaki. He and Rea became engaged and at the end of the series they were married.

Before the ceremony, Tenchi at first was angry when he found out that the story he was told about how his late mother Kiyone died was fictitious. Eventually Tenchi and Nobuyuki talked and Tenchi apologized for his earlier behavior and chose to accept his father's new wife Rea, as she had been more of a mother figure to him than his real mother and having her around won't be any different. Nobuyuki admitted that it was because of that fictitious story that they hesitated to tell him about the truth behind Kiyone's death or that Kiyone was also a prankster.

Due to his Juraian heritage and training (enhancement) at the Galaxy Academy, Nobuyuki has lived longer than any normal human, and is currently around two hundred years of age.

Tenchi Universe

In Tenchi Universe, Nobuyuki is in fact Katsuhito's son-in-law, and he prefers to address Katsuhito as father since Nobuyuki married into the Masaki family and took up the Masaki surname. Nobuyuki's personality is very similar to that of the OVA series. One difference is that since Nobuyuki and Tenchi have always lived with Katsuhito, Nobuyuki constantly complains about the long commute and how he cannot catch a break from work with so many development projects. Nobuyuki has also a few times hit on his female secretary and even brought in a Bouquet of flowers for her. Although Nobuyuki had to travel with everyone to Planet Jurai and found out the truth about the mysteries revolving around his son and father-in-law, by the time he had gotten back to Earth, Nobuyuki had not changed at all.

Tenchi Muyo! in Love

In the movie Tenchi the Movie: Tenchi Muyo in Love we see another side of Nobuyuki. Back when he and Tenchi's mother Achika (the name of Tenchi's mother in Tenchi Universe and Tenchi in Tokyo) were in high school, Nobuyuki was very shy and was not the sleazy pervert back then. Nobuyuki used to draw houses as he had a talent for drawing before he got into his job as an architect and also loved to record him and Achika on a video camera, although both of them were too shy to express their feelings towards one another. Although Nobuyuki was trapped with Achika along with Kain in a second dimension, it was watching Nobuyuki getting knocked unconscious by Kain that awakened Achika's dormant Jurai powers. Both were rescued by Tenchi, Ryoko, and Ayeka and then both of their memories were erased so it wouldn't affect the future. Ironically, the dream house that Nobuyuki had drawn for him and Achika is in fact the house that he, Tenchi, and their extended family now live in.

Tenchi Forever!

In the movie Tenchi Forever! The Movie, Nobuyuki only makes a brief cameo at the beginning of the film. After six months since Tenchi had disappeared, Nobuyuki told Katsuhito that after he filed a missing-person report to the police for Tenchi, they had found nothing. Nobuyuki became worried about Tenchi, but Katsuhito reminds Nobuyuki that Tenchi is not a weak man.

Tenchi in Tokyo

Nobuyuki's personality is slightly different in Tenchi in Tokyo. He is not perverted, although he is shown as a smoker in this series. He also deeply cares about Tenchi's best interests and does what he can to help him, including not giving the girls a train ticket to Tokyo. He is frequently tortured for comic relief purposes, along with Ryo-Oh-Ki.

Nobuyuki was also married to Achika in this version.

Magical Project S

Nobuyuki makes a cameo appearance as the character Nobuyuki Onijigoku (鬼地獄 信幸, Onijigoku Nobuyuki) (aka Oni Jigoku in the Pioneer subtitles) in Episode 10 of the Pretty Sammy television series. Onijigoku is the rival of the Hagakure clan and has attempted to force the head of the Hagakure clan, Genjuro Hagakure out of his ninja theme park so he could convert it into a wild-western style theme park. Despite temporarily having the help of both Genjuro's grandson Binpachi, as well as Pixy Misa, Onijigoku wasn't able to achieve his plan. However Genjuro convinced him that the theme park can be a ninja/wild-west theme park, but still had Onijigoku and his assistant bound to his theme park entrance as punishment for what he had tried to do.

==== Kiyone Masaki ====
Kiyone Masaki
- Tenchi Muyo! character
- Created by: Masaki Kajishima and Hiroki Hayashi
- Voiced by: Japanese; Emi Shinohara; English; Petrea Burchard (OVA 1), Wendee Lee (OVA 3)

In-universe information
- Relatives: Katsuhito Masaki (father, Tenchi Muyo! Ryo-Ohki); Airi Masaki (mother, Tenchi Muyo! Ryo-Ohki); Nobuyuki Masaki (husband, Tenchi Muyo! Ryo-Ohki); Tennyo Masaki (daughter, Tenchi Muyo! Ryo-Ohki); Tenchi Masaki (son, Tenchi Muyo! Ryo-Ohki)

Kiyone Masaki (not to be confused with Kiyone Makibi) is the mother of Tenchi and Tennyo Masaki, as well as the younger sister of Minaho Masaki. Although she was a loving, kind person and an excellent cook (she had taken in Rea Masaki when she found her unconscious in the forest, and taught her how to cook), she also inherited the playful spirit of her mother Airi Masaki, such as pulling pranks and doing things in an outlandish fashion; it was revealed that, at the time of her death, Kiyone was 248 and suffering from senility. Prior to her death, Kiyone co-wrote a script for an outlandish explanation of her death for Tenchi when he came of age, titled "Mom is so carefree!"

===== Achika Masaki =====
Achika Masaki
- Tenchi Muyo! character
- Created by: Naoko Hasegawa
- Voiced by: Japanese; Megumi Hayashibara (TMiL); Akemi Okamura (Magical Project S); English; Grace Zandarski (TMiL)

In-universe information
- Relatives: Katsuhito Masaki (father, Tenchi Universe); Itsuki Masaki (mother, Tenchi Universe); Kagato Jurai (uncle, deceased, Tenchi Universe); Nobuyuki Masaki (husband, Tenchi Universe and Tenchi in Tokyo); Tenchi Masaki (son, Tenchi Universe and Tenchi in Tokyo)

Achika Masaki (柾木 阿知花, Masaki Achika) is a fictional character in the Tenchi Muyo! anime series. She is an original creation of first OVA series' co-writer Naoko Hasegawa, making her animated debut in the 1996 feature Tenchi the Movie: Tenchi Muyo in Love. She was the wife of Nobuyuki, the daughter of Katsuhito Masaki (Yosho), and the mother of Tenchi. In the Ryo-Ohki OVA series she does not appear. In that series, Tenchi's mother is Kiyone Masaki, who only appears in a flashback.

She was referenced in Episode 9 of Tenchi Universe, "No Need for Memories".

Tenchi Muyo! in Love

In Tenchi Muyo! in Love, Achika Masaki is Nobuyuki's classmate, and though not forward enough to say it the two have a crush on one another. But what she did not realize is that she was the prime target for the intergalactic criminal, Kain, who seeks revenge on the Juraian Royal Family by traveling back to 1970 to kill her, wanting an end to their bloodline and place in power. Should he succeed, Tenchi would never have been born and cease to exist in the present.

With the aid of Washu, Tenchi and the gang travel back in time to prevent Kain from achieving his goal. In the end, Achika recognized her future son's appearance, and unleashing her great, hidden Juraian power, she engages in battle with Kain herself. Though she's able to save Tenchi and her future husband, the immense amount of energy dispelled shortened Achika's own life. With their fates erased from memory, she and Nobuyuki spend what time they have happy together, until when in 1984 Achika dies, leaving Tenchi motherless at the age of five. Coincidentally Achika's mother also died when Achika was an adolescent.

Hasegawa novels

Unlike her counterpart in Hiroshi Negishi's continuity, Achika's past is set in the original OVA series, and lacks the presence of time travel or Kain. She showed great potential even as a young woman, able to see spirits and speak to Funaho, her father's Royal Tree. Yosho hoped for her to inherit the sword and mantle of the royal family (as Tenchi later would). But she was in love and yearned to remain a normal girl without the burden the title would bring upon her.

Still, Achika did not wish to disappoint her father, and with this conflict in her heart she took the bonding ritual with Funaho... and failed, being wounded severely. The man she had loved abandoned her while she was on the mend, causing Achika's efforts to have been for nothing and her heart to break. A year later, Achika had recuperated but was far weaker than in her younger days, catching notice and marrying the much older Nobuyuki because of his resemblance to her father (both were Yosho's descendants).

After another year had passed, Achika gave birth to Tenchi, and everything seemed well. However, at five years of age the powers latent in the boy surfaced, and in poor condition and unable to defend herself Achika was fatally hurt by the Lighthawk Wings. On her deathbed, she asks her father to continue training Tenchi, as her place was now with the goddess Tsunami.

Other appearances

Achika appears in a cameo role in episode 10 of Magical Project S (Pretty Samy TV) as Shinobi Hagakure (葉隠 しのび, Hagakure Shinobi), the granddaughter of Genjuro Hagakure. She is a bit clumsy, but is dedicated to help protect her family's theme park and was the only one who could protect it, as her grandfather was bedridden, and her brother, Binpachi, had defected to Nobuyuki Onijigoku's side. That is, until Sasami Kawai and her father Ginji arrived to help them during Sasami's summer vacation.

She also appears in Tenchi in Tokyo in flashback scenes in Episodes 7, 12, and 17 (In episode 7, somehow in the English version, she was referred to as Tenchi's grandmother, but in the Japanese, she is his mother). In this version, she was still Tenchi's mother and Nobuyuki's wife. Before her death, Achika gave Tenchi his crystal necklace as an heirloom and a memento of her, which would play a crucial role throughout the series.

An abbreviated version of her tale in Tenchi Muyo in Love! is told in Hitoshi Okuda's seventh No Need for Tenchi! graphic novel, unique to its own canon within the series. Most themes are similar to the film, except Achika does not transform and fight Kain by her lonesome. Instead, she releases all her inner strength in one blast, with her and her son killing the villain together. Peculiarly, while she is not shown in her Juraian state during the actual adaptation she is featured as such on the book's cover.

==== Tennyo Masaki ====
Tennyo Masaki
- Tenchi Muyo! character
- Voiced by: Emi Shinohara (Japanese); Peggy O'Neal (English)

In-universe information
- Relatives: Nobuyuki Masaki (father); Kiyone Masaki (mother, deceased); Rea Masaki (stepmother); Tenchi Masaki (brother); Kenshi Masaki (half-brother); Katsuhito Masaki (maternal grandfather); Airi Masaki (maternal grandmother); Minaho Masaki (maternal aunt)

Tennyo Masaki (柾木 天女, Masaki Ten'nyo) is Tenchi Masaki's older sister and a fictional character in the anime Tenchi Muyo!, making her first appearance in the third OVA series.

Tennyo is an exact double for Kiyone Masaki, Tenchi's and her mother in the OVAs. Despite her youthful looks, Tennyo is 80 years old, and like their grandfather Katsuhito (Yosho), she often uses an older appearance when among others. Because of her similarity to Kiyone Masaki, Tennyo would often swap places with her and take care of Tenchi when he was a baby. She left right after Their mother had died, only to reappear when it came time to introduce Noike.

Once she had arrived back on Earth, their father Nobuyuki Masaki was supposed to pretend that Tennyo was Kiyone. However, when he overacted his role, Tennyo was forced to knock him out. Tennyo explained that since she is 80 years old, it would have caused an uproar if she had stayed with Tenchi, since some of her old classmates were still around. Katsuhito later explained to Tenchi that it is because that the Masaki family are forbidden to reveal their true identity to the people of the Earth, since Earth's civilization is still in the development stage, which is the main reason why Tennyo had to leave before.

After that, Tennyo left to go on one final trip together with her old classmates in Hawaii, with their grandmother Airi Masaki and came back just before their father Nobuyuki was to be married to Rea Masaki and then she attended the wedding.

Judging from information from Kajishima-sensei's doujins, Tennyo works at the Galaxy Police or for Airi. She also designed the armaments on the original Kamidake (Seina Yamada's ship)

==== Airi Masaki ====
Airi Magma Masaki
- Tenchi Muyo! character
- Voiced by: Japanese; Sakiko Tamagawa; English; Kari Wahlgren (credited in GXP as 'Renee Emerson')

In-universe information
- Species: Airaian
- Relatives: Azusa Masaki Jurai (common law father-in-law); Funaho Masaki Jurai (common law mother-in-law); Katsuhito Masaki (common law husband); Minaho Masaki (daughter); Kiyone Masaki (daughter, deceased); Nobuyuki Masaki (son-in-law); Rea Masaki (daughter-in-law); Tenchi Masaki (grandson); Tennyo Masaki (granddaughter); Mayuka (great-granddaughter)

Airi Masaki (柾木 アイリ, Masaki Airi) is a fictional character in the anime Tenchi Muyo!, making her first animated appearance in the third part of the OVA series and its spinoff, Tenchi Muyo! GXP.

A native of the planet Airai, Airi is Yosho's current wife. She first met Yosho when he went to study at the Galaxy Police Academy. Before she fell in love with Yosho, she was to be married to a member of one of the Juraian royal houses in order so one day she might rise to the throne. This was because the Airaians wanted to get hold of Tsunami, as they believed Tsunami to be one of "the three lives", the three goddesses known as the Chousin (For the other two Chousin, see Tokimi and Washu).

She later called off the engagement when she fell in love with Yosho and was pregnant with his child. She then had the fetus surgically removed and put in stasis until some time later. Later, the child was put back into the womb, was born and named Minaho. She later had another child with Yosho which was named Kiyone Masaki. (Tenchi's mother), which makes her Tenchi's grandmother. However, anyone mentioning the fact that she is a grandmother better learn to run fast... she never likes to hear that she is a grandmother. Not even Tenchi dares to call her 'Grandma'. Conversively, he cannot even call her Airi, lest he be affectionately smothered due to how he says it (in Japanese, use of another's given name without honorifics is considered very familiar). In the end, as per suggestion, he simply sticks with the formal Ms. Airi (Airi-san).

She is currently head of the Jurai sector office of the Galaxy Police.

Tenchi originally met Airi in the second episode of the third OVA, when she travelled to Earth to introduce Tenchi's arranged bride Noike to Tenchi and the girls. But while waiting for Tennyo Masaki to give the word to transport down, Noike ran off.

Airi also works as the chairwoman for the Galaxy Police Academy, and works closely with the Academy's headmistress Mikami Kuramitsu. Although Airi has a minor part thus far in the OVA's, she has a larger role to play in GXP.

Airi is also a master of the Neo-Academy fighting style, a martial art often employed during discussions and negotiation. The techniques involved consisted of mainly slapping the offending party silly, as well as employing a cold, hard stare. Airi had used this fighting style on Ryoko when she referred to Airi as 'a middle-aged flusie' and 'a crusty-old hag', with great success. She also has a joker attitude and loves to play practical jokes... whenever she can get away with it. She had even co-wrote the explanation of her daughter Kiyone's death (with help from Kiyone), for which it was to be told to Tenchi. Her older daughter Minaho, however, does not have this trait.

She also has a love for cooking, and would be found in one of the G.P. Academy's restaurants practicing her love. Seina Yamada found out about this when, as a joke committed by Amane Kaunaq, he referred to Airi as 'Granny' when her back was turned to Seina. When Seina found out, he was terrified (mostly because Airi was holding a chef's knife at the time). However, she demonstrates some affection for Seina (feeling jealous of Seto for being able to hang around with Seina while she (Airi) is stuck doing paperwork and crying out for Seina to come back to regular GP duty when she gets overwhelmed by the mountains of paperwork) and shows respect for his being able to take Tarant Shank down and out by himself.

==== Rea Masaki ====
Rea Masaki
- Tenchi Muyo! character
- Voiced by: Rio Natsuki (Japanese); Mona Marshall (English)

In-universe information
- Relatives: Nobuyuki Masaki (husband); Tennyo Masaki (stepdaughter); Tenchi Masaki (stepson); Kenshi Masaki (son)

Rea Masaki (正木 玲亜, Masaki Reia) is a fictional character in the Tenchi Muyo! series and is only a character in the OVA continuity.

Rea Masaki is Nobuyuki Masaki's second wife, having been raised as a ward of the Masaki family, after having been found (in her early preteens) and taken-in as an adoptive younger sister by the late Kiyone Masaki, Nobuyuki's late first wife. Rea had also been taught cooking by Kiyone, so even though she does have her favorite recipes, her cooking style is virtually identical to Kiyone's.

On the day of Kiyone's funeral rites, she was checking on Tenchi Masaki when she noticed the boy had disappeared. Everyone present searched around for Tenchi but couldn't find him. It was during this search that Rea thought of something. Taking Nobuyuki with her, they found Tenchi asleep at the entrance to the cave where Ryoko Hakubi was imprisoned. Tenchi was forbidden to go to the cave by his grandfather Katsuhito Masaki, but always went there anyway. Rea remembered this.

Rea would end up cooking and cleaning house for the Masaki, even though she was a high school student at the time. Sometime later, she would move in with Nobuyuki at an apartment near the site of the house that Nobuyuki designed during Kiyone's lifetime (that house would be moved near the family shrine, destroyed when Mihoshi crashed into it, and rebuilt at the same site). When the school which Tenchi attended was destroyed by fire, not to mention the Great Seto Bridge's destruction, she and Katsuhito were called to Tokyo to explain what had happened, at the Japanese Imperial Palace no less. At the last minute, Katsuhito backed out and Rea had to make the report herself. Months later, she revealed this fact to Tenchi when he came over for a visit, but when he asked her why, she said it was a secret.

At the last episode of the third OVA, Rea and Nobuyuki were married. Among the guests present were the Masaki clan, Airi Masaki, Minaho Masaki, and Tokimi. In Tenchi Muyo! GXP, she is shown to be pregnant. Her son, Kenshi Masaki, is the principal character of Tenchi Muyo! War on Geminar and Rea's mysterious connection to the world of Geminar (part of the reason why Kenshi is sent to Geminar) is revealed in that series.

==== Akie Masaki ====
Akie Masaki
- Tenchi Muyo! character
- Voiced by: Rio Natsuki (Japanese); Mona Marshall (English)

In-universe information
- Relatives: Yōshō Masaki Jurai (Katsuhito Masaki) (ancestor); Nobuyuki Masaki (distant cousin); Tennyo Masaki (distant cousin); Tenchi Masaki (distant cousin); Kenshi Masaki (distant cousin)

First appearing in OVA 1 episode 4, she is the owner and manager of an Onsen (regularly visited by members of the Masaki family/village), and Tenchi's great-aunt on his father's side (making her also a descendant of Yosho's through his first wife, Kasumi (a niece of his mother, the Empress Funaho, not to be mistaken with Tenchi's cousin Kasumi, Taro's mother, who was named for her)). Her name was revealed in OVA 4.

=== Jurai ===
==== Azaka and Kamidake ====
Azaka and Kamidake
- Tenchi Muyo! character
- Voiced by: Japanese; Kenichi Ogata (Azaka); Wataru Takagi (Kamidake); English; Mark Tracy (1st Azaka, 2nd Kamidake); Phil Fox (1st Kamidake); Doug Stone (2nd Azaka); Michael Sorich (3rd Kamidake)

Azaka (阿座化, Azaka) and Kamidake (火美猛, Kamidake) are fictional characters in the manga and anime series Tenchi Muyo!

Azaka and Kamidake, Ayeka's guardians, in the form of floating logs. They can generate a barrier that allows them to protect Ayeka and paralyze their target, though their powers pale in comparison to the power held by the Royal Trees of Jurai.

Tenchi Muyo! OVA's In the Tenchi Muyo! OVA's they are minor characters and serve as doorposts to the Masaki home whenever they are not needed. In the third OVA, their lack of mobility had led to them growing moss and seedlings on them.

Tenchi Universe In the Tenchi Universe storyline, the personalities of two legendary Jurai knights with the same names have been downloaded into them. Near the end of the series, the original Azaka and Kamidake are resurrected when Yosho uses his energy to draw the energies from the two guardians Azaka and Kamidake and transfer them into the original knights in order to resurrect them. The two knights then help Tenchi Masaki get to the Jurai throne room to face Kagato while they face the Dark Jurai knights that serve Kagato.

After the battle, Washu is able to reactivate the guardians Azaka and Kamidake. Both the knights have a cameo in the movie Tenchi Muyo in Love 2 which is also set in the same continuity.

Tenchi in Tokyo Azaka and Kamidake also appear in Tenchi in Tokyo in log form. The only difference they have in this continuity is that they have hidden blasters behind their log shells which they use to attack their enemies with. Other than that they follow Ayeka's orders no matter what the consequences may be.

Pretty Sammy Azaka and Kamidake's log forms make a brief appearance in the final episode of Magical Project S (Pretty Sammy TV) as the barrier system that protects Romio's NT System. They were destroyed when Pretty Sammy used the energy from Washu's NT system for her Full Power, Pretty Attack.

==== Azusa Jurai ====
Azusa Masaki Jurai
- Tenchi Muyo! character
- Voiced by: Japanese; Akio Ōtsuka; English; John Lee (OVA 2); Dave Mallow (GXP)

In-universe information
- Species: Juraian
- Title: Emperor of Jurai
- Relatives: Kazuki Yotsuga (father); Amame Masaki Jurai (mother); Funaho Masaki Jurai (first wife); Misaki Kamiki Jurai (second wife); Seto Kamiki Jurai (mother-in-law); Yosho Masaki Jurai (son); Ayeka Masaki Jurai (daughter); Sasami Masaki Jurai (daughter); Airi Masaki(common law daughter-in-law); Tenchi Masaki (great-grandson)
- Royal Tree: Kirito (1st Gen)

Azusa Masaki Jurai (柾木 阿主沙 樹雷, Masaki Azusa Jurai) is a fictional character in the anime Tenchi Muyo! Ryo-Ohki, emperor of the planet Jurai.

Episode appearances

Azusa only appears in OVA episode 13 and briefly in two episodes of Tenchi Muyo! GXP. Azusa is the father of Yosho, Ayeka, and Sasami. He strongly disapproves of Ayeka's interest in Tenchi, and also greatly underestimates Tenchi's abilities. He is the head of House Masaki, though Funaho rules the house while he is on the throne of Jurai.

In Chapter 1 ("Omen") of Volume 7 ("Picture Book") of Hitoshi Okuda's The All-New Tenchi Muyo! manga, Azusa, Funaho and Misaki visit the Masaki family shrine to participate in the New Year festivities. While he scores "father points" with Sasami courtesy of otoshidama (a traditional gift of money in a decorated envelope), he is nearly drowned courtesy of one of Washu's special fortunes ("LESSER BAD LUCK: You will meet with a flood and be unable to escape"). When Ayeka gets too cosy with Tenchi (after she drinks some sake), he challenges Tenchi to a duel but loses thanks to Ryo-Ohki's drawing a GREATER GOOD LUCK fortune ("A song will save the one you love") and getting hit by lightning after Ryo-Ohki sings a song during the fight. in the end, he joins everyone else in praying before the shrine (praying that Ayeka and Sasami would return home).

In Tenchi Muyo! GXP, Azusa, along with his close friend and Seto's husband Utsutsumi Kamiki, was present at Kiriko Masaki's bonding ceremony. He also appears with his wives Funaho and Misaki when it was revealed that Seina Yamada had become part of Jurai's royal line; Azusa was clearly unhappy about it, muttering about Seina's being under Seto's thumb.

True Tenchi novels

Azusa has the only first generation tree ship in the fleet at this moment, Kirito (Yosho's tree Funaho is also first generation, but at the moment it is currently rooted on Earth, while Tsunami-Fume, which belongs to Sasami, is 0th Generation). Being a first generation ship, it is blessed with enormous power, although not invulnerable. When Azusa fought Kagato his ship was matched against the giant Sōja, and to Azusa's chagrin he found that Kagato was a match for him in power.

Kagato calls upon Ryo-Ohki to attack, and her attack slices through Kirito's Lighthawk wings. Ryo-Ohki's power through its gems could counteract that of the Royal Trees, since both took their strength from the Chousin (Washu and Tsunami, respectively). The clash of energy was considerable, causing a rip in space which Tsunami herself was forced to repair.

Defeated, Kirito was then transported away from Sōja and put near Earth by Tsunami. While there, Azusa saves a young woman from bandits and she helps him recoup from his injuries received from Kagato. Her name was Funaho, the Earthling he would later court and take back to Jurai to be his first wife.

==== Funaho Jurai ====
Funaho Masaki Jurai
- Tenchi Muyo! character
- Created by: Masaki Kajishima
- Voiced by: Rei Sakuma (Japanese); Grace Zandarski (English)

In-universe information
- Species: Half Juraian/Half Terran
- Title: First Empress of Jurai
- Relatives: Azusa Masaki Jurai (husband); Kazuki Yotsuga (father-in-law); Amame Yotsuga (mother-in-law); Misaki Kamiki Jurai (co-wife); Seto Kamiki Jurai (mother-in-law); Yosho Masaki Jurai (son); Ayeka Masaki Jurai (stepdaughter); Sasami Masaki Jurai (stepdaughter); Airi Masaki (common law daughter-in-law); Tenchi Masaki (great-grandson)
- Royal Tree: Mizuho (2nd Gen)

Funaho Masaki Jurai (柾木 船穂 樹雷, Masaki Funaho Jurai) is a fictional character in the anime Tenchi Muyo!, an empress of the planet Jurai. She is canon to the Tenchi Muyo! Ryo-Ohki OVAs, also appearing in its television spinoff Tenchi Muyo! GXP.

Funaho is Azusa Masaki Jurai's first wife, and the mother of Yosho. She also serves as Jurai's Minister of Intelligence, and sees right through Yosho's "Katsuhito" disguise. She is a distant descendant of Masaki, the sister of the first ruler of Jurai, but considers herself to be human since she was born on Earth.

Her main reason for coming to Earth, in OVA Episode 13, other than to see Yosho and to check up on Ayeka and Sasami, was to ask Washu if she would assist Jurai by mass producing Ryoko and Ryo-Ohki for their defenses. However, Washu already knew about this reason and refused because, to Washu, not only would she not betray Tenchi's trust by accepting the offer, she also felt there should only be one Ryoko and Ryo-ohki. Washu then assured a worried Funaho that she won't mass produce Ryoko or Ryo-ohki for any of Jurai's enemies, because she has no interest in helping anyone. (Washu does eventually create a "sister" of Ryo-ohki named Fuku.)

Funaho is paired with the second-generation tree Mizuho, a twin of 2nd Empress Misaki's Karin, both ships have the ability to join together as well, the relationship being a parallel to Funaho and Misaki being married to the same husband.

In Volume 6 ("Dream A Little Scheme") of Hitoshi Okuda's manga series No Need for Tenchi, Funaho and Misaki jointly command the Jurain fleet that goes to retrieve the stolen Royal Tree Bizen (see "Yume" below). At the moment of crisis when Tenchi rallies everyone, Funaho looks on with pride. After Tsumani stabilizes the rogue Bizen, Funaho intimates to Washu that no charges will be brought against Yume, claiming that she and Misaki "just came to see [their] daughters.".

In Volume 9 ("The Quest for More Money") of No Need for Tenchi, both Funaho and Misaki work together and use reverse psychology to get Azusa to send money to help the Masaki family with their dwindling finances after Ayeka swallows her pride and asks her father for help. They pretend to agree with his original decision not to help, but the moment they leave (or pretend to), he starts dialing the Masaki number as they enjoy his being "an old softie".

In Volume 10 ("Mother Planet") of No Need for Tenchi, both Funaho and Misaki come to the Masaki household for a visit. In the story "Cordiality", Funaho asks Tenchi to show her around Kurashiki City, and he lends her his mother's kimono to wear. While Tenchi is searching for a sandal strap (hers had broken while being saved by Tenchi from a runaway car), she is attacked by a mysterious assassin, but she easily defeats and captures him. When Tenchi returns, she asks him to look after Ayeka and Sasami, but he replies (to her amusement) that it is they who seem to be looking after him.

Funaho appears in the story "A Carrot A Day" (Volume 1: "Alien Nation" of Hitoshi Okuda's manga series The All-New Tenchi Muyo!), where she appears in Ayeka's flashback to the time shortly after Yosho left Jurai to chase Ryoko and all contact had been lost. Ayeka had been so upset that she had refused to eat, and only Sasami making her a carrot cake had snapped her out of her depression (Ayeka normally doesn't like carrots, but she [like everyone else] regards Sasami's carrot cake as special). Funaho is shown with Misaki worrying about Ayeka and later watching from Ayeka's bedroom doorway as Sasami gets Ayeka to finally eat.

In Chapters 2 ("Suspicion") and 3 ("Sacrifice") of Volume 6 ("Pet Peeves") of The All-New Tenchi Muyo!, Washu consults with Funaho about the little creature Mitsu whom Ayeka has adopted as a pet. Funaho informs Washu, Katsuhito and Tenchi that the Mitsu are the natural enemy of the Juraian Royal Trees and that this particular Mitsu has been genetically mutated by religious extremists from the planet Airai who are hostile to Jurai. The mutation eventually turns Mitsu into a monster and Ayeka (much to her grief, but with Mitsu's own consent) ends Mitsu's life herself rather than let anyone else take on the burden.

In Chapter 1 ("Omen") of Volume 7 ("Picture Book") of The All-New Tenchi Muyo!, Funaho, Azusa and Misaki visit the Masaki family shrine to participate in the New Year festivities. She not only gets Azusa to behave himself, but her dressing in temple maiden robes causes him to really stop and stare. When everyone prays at the shrine, she prays for "good health for [her] family".

In Tenchi Muyo! GXP, she along with Azusa and Misaki were present when it was revealed that Seina was third in line for the throne of Jurai and was clearly not happy about Airi's informal addressing Azusa as "Father".

==== Misaki Jurai ====
Misaki Kamiki Jurai
- Tenchi Muyo! character
- Created by: Masaki Kajishima
- Voiced by: Japanese; Yoshiko Sakakibara; English; Grace Zandarski (OVA 2); Kari Wahlgren (OVA 3)

In-universe information
- Alias: "The Counter-actor"
- Nickname: "Little Monkey"
- Species: Juraian
- Title: Second Empress of Jurai
- Relatives: Seto Kamiki Jurai (mother); Utsutsumi Kamiki (father); Noike Kamiki Jurai (adopted sister); Azusa Masaki Jurai (husband); Funaho Masaki Jurai (co-wife); Ayeka Masaki Jurai (daughter); Sasami Masaki Jurai (daughter); Yōshō Masaki Jurai (stepson)
- Royal Tree: Karin (2nd Gen)

Misaki Masaki Jurai (柾木 美砂樹 樹雷, Masaki Misaki Jurai) is a fictional character in the anime Tenchi Muyo!, an empress of the planet Jurai. She is canon to the Tenchi Muyo! Ryo-Ohki OVAs, also appearing in its television spinoff Tenchi Muyo! GXP.

Misaki is Azusa's second wife, and the mother of Ayeka and Sasami. She possesses immense physical strength and is the supreme commander of Jurai's royal bodyguards. She is from House Kamiki of the Royal Family, her mother being Seto Jurai and her adopted sister Noike Kamiki Jurai. She also gets along pretty well with Azusa's first wife, Funaho Jurai (in fact, they make a perfect team when manipulating Emperor Azusa on Tenchi and Ayeka's behalf), and refers to her as Oneesama ("older sister").

In episode 19, it was revealed that Misaki is-or perhaps will become- some sort of god-like being that Z refers to as the "counter-actor", and will have powers surpassing that of the Chousin. ("Omatsuri Zenjitsu no Yoru", a recent doujinshi from Masaki Kajishima, confirmed that this is indeed the real Misaki, not just a being assuming her form). When Misaki attacked and nearly strangled Tokimi to death, Tenchi appears in a glowing form to calm her down, and the two of them kiss and disappear from view. Earlier on, Kajishima's Tenchi novel "Jurai" foretold her future long before her third OVA appearance, reading that someday "the galaxy will know the true terror of Misaki" and that "only Tenchi could stop her". There is little or no explanation regarding the purpose of the "counter-actor", how she received her powers, or why she commits the actions she does.

Misaki is known for having her two daughters address her in a certain way, and is very overprotective of them; in episode 13, Ayeka cried out to Misaki, calling her "Okaa-sama!" ("Mommy!" in the dubbed version) in a high-pitched voice. Ryoko thought this was hilarious, but she regrets saying that as Misaki got mad at her and stretches Ryoko's face. Ayeka wasn't sympathetic to Ryoko, since she warned her not to say anything to begin with. The only way Ryoko got out of this was reading a sign that Sasami written, which said, "I'm sorry, pretty young lady". This was also why Ryoko did not answer the door in episode 14, thinking Misaki was there, when in fact it was Tenchi's sister Tennyo.

Misaki is paired with the second-generation tree Karin, a twin of 1st Empress Funaho's Mizuho. Both ships have the ability to join together as well. The relationship being a parallel to Funaho and Misaki considering each other sisters married to the same husband.

In Volume 6 ("Dream A Little Scheme") of Hitoshi Okuda's manga series No Need for Tenchi, Misaki and Funaho jointly command the Jurain fleet that goes to retrieve the stolen Royal Tree Bizen (see "Yume" below); she eagerly anticipates visiting Earth after Bizen is recovered to see Sasami and the gang (with her arms loaded down with presents). After Tsumani stabilizes the rogue Bizen, Misaki gives both Minagi and Asahi her trademark bear-hug and line "She's so cute!" and stretches Ryoko's mouth again for referring to her as an "old woman".

In Volume 9 ("The Quest for More Money") of No Need for Tenchi, both Funaho and Misaki work together and use reverse psychology to get Azusa to send money to help the Masaki family with their dwindling finances after Ayeka swallows her pride and asks her father for help. They pretend to agree with his original decision not to help, but the moment they leave (or pretend to), he starts dialing the Masaki number as they enjoy his being "an old softie".

In Volume 10 ("Mother Planet"), both Funaho and Misaki come to the Masaki household for a visit, causing both Ryoko and Ayeka to try to beat a hasty retreat before the mothers arrive (they fail, naturally). In the story "Reliability", the capture of a small monkey (whom Sasami names "Saru-chan") leads both Sasami and Misaki to investigate why a band of monkeys have come down from the mountain to steal food. They learn that unseasonable weather has been preventing the monkeys' supply of nuts and acorns from ripening, and Mizuki calls upon the twin Juraian trees Karin and Mizuho to help revitalize the mountain itself. A bumper crop of acorns and chestnuts immediately sprouts, the monkeys' food supply is assured for at least another ten years and Misaki is hailed by the monkeys as a Goddess.

Misaki has an appearance in the story "A Carrot A Day" (Volume 1: "Alien Nation" of Hitoshi Okuda's manga series The All-New Tenchi Muyo!), where she appears in Ayeka's flashback to the time shortly after Yosho left Jurai to chase Ryoko and all contact had been lost. Ayeka had been so upset that she had refused to eat, and only Sasani's making her a carrot cake had snapped her out of her depression (Ayeka normally doesn't like carrots, but she [like everyone else] regards Sasami's carrot cake as special). Misaki is shown with Funaho worrying about Ayeka and later watching from Ayeka's bedroom doorway as Sasami gets Ayeka to finally eat.

In Chapter 1 ("Omen") of Volume 7 ("Picture Book") of Hitoshi Okuda's The All-New Tenchi Muyo manga, Misaki, Funaho and Azusa visit the Masaki family shrine to participate in the New Year festivities.

In Tenchi Muyo! GXP she, Azusa, and Funaho were present when it was revealed that Seina was third in line for the throne of Jurai and was clearly not happy about Airi's addressing Azusa informally as "Father".

==== Seto Kamiki Jurai ====
Seto Kamiki Jurai
- Tenchi Muyo! character
- Voiced by: Yukari Nozawa (Japanese); Melora Harte (English)

In-universe information
- Nickname: The Devil Princess of Jurai
- Species: Juraian
- Relatives: Utsutsumi Kamiki (husband); Misaki Kamiki Jurai (daughter); Noike Kamiki Jurai (adopted daughter); Mashisu Kuramitsu (adopted daughter); Misao Kuramitsu (son-in-law); Azusa Masaki Jurai (son-in-law); Ayeka Masaki Jurai (granddaughter); Sasami Masaki Jurai (granddaughter); Yōshō Masaki Jurai (step grandson)
- Royal Tree: Mikagami (2nd Gen)

Seto Kamiki Jurai (神木 瀬戸 樹雷, Kamiki Seto Jurai) is a fictional character in the Tenchi Muyo! series, as well as a brief part in Hitoshi Okuda's The All-New Tenchi Muyo! manga series, published in the U.S. by VIZ Media.

Seto is the mother of Empress Misaki and the adopted mother of Noike Jurai (grandmother of Ayeka and Sasami), and is a very powerful 'behind the scenes' figure in Jurai politics. Among the royal family. A survivor of the pirate raid of the Jurai Royal Science Academy post on planet K-1190 over 5,000 years prior to GXP, Seto was adopted by the Kamiki family, and retains an intense hatred of pirates. She is married to the Kamiki clan's head, Utsutsumi Kamiki.

Her treeship, Mikagami, is known for her special attack, The Triple Z (AKA the "Genocide Dance"), which literally causes all enemies to stop in their tracks; either due to an Electromagnetic Pulse or some other mechanism, though the effect of this is left to the viewer's imagination.

Because of her political craftiness, and occasionally violent temper, she has been referred to as the "Devil Princess of Jurai".

Seto has a cameo appearance in the story "A Carrot A Day" (Volume 1: "Alien Nation" of Hitoshi Okuda's manga series The All-New Tenchi Muyo), where she appears in Ayeka's flashback to the time shortly after Yosho left Jurai to chase Ryoko and all contact had been lost. Ayeka had been so upset that she had refused to eat, and only Sasani's making her a carrot cake had snapped her out of her depression (Ayeka normally doesn't like carrots, but she [like everyone else] regards Sasami's carrot cake as special). Seto is shown with Sasami in the kitchen and later watching from Ayeka's bedroom doorway as Sasami gets Ayeka to finally eat. She is also mentioned in Chapter 1 ("Longings") of Volume 6 ("Pet Peeves") of The All-New Tenchi Muyo! when Azusa goes to great lengths to make sure a note is delivered personally to Ayeka, not wanting Seto to find out about it as she might make fun of him.

Seto had a small but significant part in the third OVA series (she commented that she had once held Tenchi when he was a baby) and it was also revealed that she already knew that Yosho had fled to Earth because he had secretly contacted her after he left Jurai. She had borrowed Tsunami-fune and used it to throw a party in hopes of bring Misao Kuramitsu and Mashisu Makibi together (which included the rare fruit wine Shinju sake, made from the fruit of Jurai's royal trees). Seto also presided over the meeting to punish those involved in the Choubimaru incident and offered to adopt Mashisu Makibi so she could marry into the Kuramitsu family until Misao's mother Mitoto arrived and announced that Mashisu had the Kuramitsu family council's support.

However Seto had a bigger and more influential role in Tenchi Muyo! GXP. Seto has a particular dislike for space pirates. Seto first met Seina Yamada when his transport ship was under attack by pirates. Seeing how Seina's bad luck could be useful not only for the GP but for herself, she agrees to support Seina and have him made an exception to enter the GP Academy although he comes from an underdeveloped world (feeling like the academy could use a little chaos once in a while). Seto had also requested to Mikami Kuramitsu to have Kiriko Masaki reassigned as an instructor at the Academy in order to train Seina to become a man.

Later, when the Daluma pirate guild brought out their good luck fleet and succeed in escaping from the Mikagami, Seto had Seina deal with them. But when Seiryo Tennan was made the captain of the luckiest ship in the Daluma fleet, the Unko, knowing the Kamidake II was no match for it in its current state and that it would take too long for Fuku the cabbit, who is the power source for the Kamidake II, to mature, Seto decided to have Kiriko go through her tree bonding ceremony to merge her new tree Miyuki with the Kamidake II in order to give it the power it needs to bring down the Unko. After using her Mikagami as a test subject for this, the ceremony was performed (with her husband Utsutsumi and Emperor Azusa as witnesses) and then the plan was executed. Seto later arranged a duel between Seiryo and Seina in order to have Seiryo surrender.

Near the end of the series, after Seina brought back the mecha that he found on the Wau planet, Seto held a meeting on the Mikagami alongside Jurai Emperor Azusa and the empresses Misaki and Funaho to discuss their findings on the mecha with Seina. Seto reported that Tsunami had told her that the first generation Juraian seed which is used as the mecha's power source is actually one of the two seeds that Tsunami had given to a person that had visited Jurai long ago. Seto also announced that Seina was now part of the Jurai royal family since the seed had bonded with Seina and third in line for the throne.

Seto, has a reputation as an unofficial "matchmaker" in the Jurai empire. She has been known to arrange marriages, either to cement alliances or just to see happens for her own amusement.

=== Galaxy Police ===
Seina Yamada
- Tenchi Muyo! GXP character
- Voiced by: Shigeru Mogi (Japanese); Tony Oliver (credited as "Raphael Antonio", English)

In-universe information
- Alias: "Lorelei-Seina" (by the pirate guilds)
- Nicknames: "Sainan" (calamity, on Earth)
- Relatives: Yoshiko Yamada (sister)
- Royal Tree: Ancient Mecha from planet in Ep 23-24 (1st Gen) Code Name: Idol

==== Seina Yamada ====
Seina Yamada (山田 西南, Yamada Seina (lit. "Southwest Mountain Field")) is a fictional character in the Tenchi Muyo! series and serves as the main character of Tenchi Muyo! GXP, a television spinoff from the original OVAs.

Unlucky boy Seina Yamada is a good friend of Tenchi Masaki (whom he addresses as "Sempai"), and his parents run a small local grocery store at the beginning of the series (due to the strong resemblance between Seina, Tenchi & Kenshi Masaki, Seina is likely a distant cousin of theirs, but none-the-less does not carry the 'Masaki' family name (though after the events of episode 26 of GXP, this may have changed)). He also has a similar personality and temperament to Tenchi's, though even more simple and humble (though ep. 24 reveals that he strong views against Animal Cruelty). However, aside from Tenchi, Kiriko Masaki and Kiriko's brother Kai (Tenchi's cousins), Seina has very few friends; mostly because he has the worst luck in the universe; minor disasters often occur in his presence, through no fault of his own, and anyone near him will stay a good distance away from him. Seina's usual (lack of) luck almost ends when a spaceship nearly crashlands on his head at the Masaki residence. Its driver, Galaxy Police Detective Second Class, Amane Kaunaq, had meant to present Tenchi Masaki with an application pamphlet for joining the G.P., but mistakenly offers Seina the application instead, under the impression that Tenchi was personally-training the boy.

His family persuades him (read, forcibly nabbing his signature and thumb print) to fill out the application, with the hope that Seina would win a prize, thinking it was for a lottery. When he wakes from sleep what he thinks is the following morning, he finds himself aboard a spaceship, recruited to be the newest member of the G.P. Academy. He also meets Mitoto Kuramitsu, the ditzy mother of Mihoshi and cleaning lady extraordinaire, before discovering his friend, Kiriko Masaki, is also a GP officer. From there, Seina is thrown into a plan to stop the Daluma pirate guild from plaguing the galaxy.

When Seina's bad luck was found to have an effect of attracting space pirates, the G.P. capitalized on it by placing Seina in command of one of the Decoy Fleet's newest ships, the Kamidake (which included systems designed by Tenchi's sister Tennyo Masaki). However, when the ship was irreparably damaged as a result of a prolonged chase and multiple battles with space pirates (including Tarant Shank, generally regarded as the most evil of all), Seto then presented Seina with a ship designed by Washu Hakubi, which was named the Kamidake II by Seina. The ship consist of the main ship body and a cabbit, similar to Ryo-Ohki, named Fuku by Seina. Fuku differs from Ryo-Ohki in that Fuku serves as a terminal body and more importantly, the power source for the ship, thus is not able to transform into a ship. However, according to Washu Hakubi, it is possible for Fuku to turn into a cabbit girl like Ryo-Ohki... if Fuku wishes for it as she matures.

Later, the ship became a hybrid, when under Seto Kamiki Jurai's supervision, it was fused together with Kiriko's second generation royal tree, Mizuki (enabling it to generate Light Hawk Wings for protection). The main pod, which house the royal tree in a Juraian Royal Tree ship, was used for the fusion.

Battles with pirates and resulting revelations

During the time Seina commanded the Kamidake and Kamidake II, he was earning an equivalent to a fleet commander's salary. However, because he was still a cadet, that money was kept in a special account until he graduated and was given what he would normally earn. A portion of the interest the money accumulated, however, was forwarded to his family on Earth; it was so much money that the Yamada family used it to build a huge new home, as well as building a huge new supermarket in places of their small home and grocery store. While Seina was visiting Tenchi back on Earth, Amane, Kiriko and Ryoko Balta, who had accompanied him, volunteered to help out at the Yamada's supermarket, where they were worked until exhausted.

It was later in the series when Seina, who was trying to rescue Fuku from rogue elements of the Galaxy Army, was found by a tribe of Wau, who correctly-mistake him for their savior and threw him into an ancient mecha, (which bears a striking reselance to Dual!'s Zinv). Somehow, Seina was able to activate the mecha, which he used to save not only Fuku, but also five cabbit clones made from Fuku's cells by Tarant, who had allied himself with the rogue G.A. faction. Angered by this, Seina fought Shank and his allies. But in doing this, the mecha was able to integrate itself to the Kamidake II, which was captured with Fuku. And even more startling, the mecha formed Light Hawk Wings, even though it was not bonded with Mizuki.

Afterward, it was revealed by Emperor Azusa and Empresses Funaho and Misaki that the mecha (now known as Jinbu (神偶, Jinbu (lit. "Idol"))) had as its power source a first generation Jurai tree seed, with the seed bonding itself with Seina. As a result, Seina is now third-in-line to the Jurai throne, behind Crown Prince Yosho and Tenchi. Thus, a political marriage between Seina, Amane, Kiriko, Ryoko Balta, and Neju was arranged for political reasons. Seina is initially very disposed against what he thinks is an attempt to force the girls into marrying him, but is later persuaded that they are doing so out of their own free wills.

However, before the ceremony could begin, two incidents occurred. First, Shank had broken into Seina's dressing room, hoping to kill the boy. Luckily, Shank's impatience gets the best of him and Seina was able to subdue and capture him. Also, Seto's ladies-in-waiting - Gyokuren, Hakuren, Karen, and Suiren - who were actually agents of the Renza Federation seeking to use Seina's abilities to rid their home from marauding pirates, kidnapped Seina into their small ship, and, when the Kamidake II catches them, began to molest him in a public broadcast to ensure the Renza Alliance's political bond with the Jurai Royal Family. As a result, the four are included into the marriage as well as the crew of the Kamidake.

==== Minami Kuramitsu ====
Minami Kuramitsu
- Tenchi Muyo! character
- Voiced by: Japanese; Fumio Matsuoka; English; Jay Hopper (OVA 1); Michael McConnohie (OVA 3 and GXP)

In-universe information
- Relatives: Mitoto Kuramitsu(daughter); Mihoshi Kuramitsu (granddaughter); Misao Kuramitsu (grandson)

Minami Kuramitsu (九羅密 美瀾, Kuramitsu Minami) is a fictional character in the Tenchi Muyo! series and is only a character in the OVA continuity.

Minami Kuramitsu is the father of Mitoto Kuramitsu, as well as the grandfather of Mihoshi Kuramitsu and Misao Kuramitsu and the Grand Marshal of the Galaxy Police. The Kuramitsu family is one of the most powerful families on the planet Seniwa, and is very dominant in the Galaxy Police.

Minami first appeared briefly in the first OVA series, where he reported to the GP commander that the criminal Kagato had returned. After that, the commander found the only officer close by is the Marshall's granddaughter Mihoshi, much to his dismay. Her superior officer Nobeyama then tried unsuccessfully to tell her to not engage Kagato, to avoid the Marshall's wrath if he were to find out that Mihoshi were in danger.

In the third OVA series, it is shown that since Minami loves his granddaughter greatly, so much so that when he received a letter (altered by Z), saying that she was being abused by Tenchi Masaki, Minami quickly dispatched her younger brother Misao aboard the Choubimaru, a huge ship owned by the Kuramitsu family, to rescue Mihoshi, and destroy the Earth to kill Tenchi. Minami went through with this plan, despite a warning from the military officer Nakita, that since the Earth is an undeveloped world, he would risk having the Earthings see it. Nakita also delivered a message from Minami's sister Mikami, that she will sell one of his gardening planets to Lady Seto should the Choubimaru be damaged in the attack, much to Minami's dismay.

In the final episode of the third OVA series during the meeting to pass judgement on those involved in the Choubimaru incident, by Mikami's judgement, Minami is demoted to the position of The Head of Maintenance at the GP spaceship dock as his punishment. When Misao had decided to marry his assistant Mashisu Makibi, at first Minami protested that she was unworthy of marrying into the Kuramitsu family, but was shocked when Mitoto had announced her support and that she was able to get the family council's approval for the wedding.

Minami has also made a few cameo appearances in Tenchi Muyo! GXP, where he not only welcomed Seina Yamada to the Galaxy Police, but he and his maintenance crew had also serviced Seina's ship the Kamidake a few times.

==== Misao Kuramitsu ====
Misao Kuramitsu
- Tenchi Muyo! character
- Voiced by: Japanese; Hikaru Midorikawa; English; Tony Oliver (OVA 3); David Mallow (GXP)

In-universe information
- Relatives: Minami Kuramitsu (grandfather); Mikami Kuramitsu (great-aunt); Mitoto Kuramitsu (mother); Mihoshi Kuramitsu (sister); Mashisu Kuramitsu (wife)

Misao Kuramitsu (九羅密 美咲生, Kuramitsu Misao) is a fictional character from the anime Tenchi Muyo! in the official Tenchi Muyo! Ryo-Ohki continuity, appearing in both the third OVA series, as well as its spin-off the Tenchi Muyo! GXP series.

Misao is the younger brother of Mihoshi Kuramitsu. In the third OVA series Misao had received a letter from Mihoshi, which said that Mihoshi was doing all these things with Tenchi Masaki. Remembering that he once heard that Tenchi is surrounded by women, Misao interpreted that Mihoshi was in a harem and was being abused by Tenchi (the letter was altered by Z originally, and later by Fuku). Because of his concern that Mihoshi would suffer a repeat of what had happened before (which wasn't elaborated in detail), Misao decided he had to kill Tenchi to save his sister.

In order to accomplish this, his grandfather the Grand Marshal Minami Kuramitsu had given Misao command of the Kuramitsu's family's newest ship, the Choubimaru, which had the capability to destroy an entire planet. The plan was lure to Mihoshi and Tenchi to the Choubimaru for a banquet, and to avoid having Mihoshi hate him, Misao would make Tenchi's death look like an accident. Misao would then accidentally destroy the Earth during their fight with Ryoko to avoid the general panic on Earth that the Choubimaru would cause when the Earthlings see the Choubimaru. When Misao had contacted Mihoshi to invite her and Tenchi on the Choubimaru, Mihoshi did not remember that she had a brother, until Misao displayed one of his old photographs which was when Mihoshi immediately recognized him. Misao then made his invitation, but before Tenchi and Mihoshi could go, Mihoshi had gotten a call from her friend Amane Kaunaq, who wanted to find out Tenchi's intentions on joining the Galaxy Police. Since an interference field was deployed around the Masaki house (deployed to make the capture of Ayeka, Ryoko and Washu easier) made the call a problem, Tenchi and Mihoshi went into Washu's lab so that they could get better reception.

Although Misao was a competent officer, he's insecure and unsure of himself. His is also easily intimidated, as evident when Mashisu Makibi spanked him for calling her a lowly servant. He was also unaware that Mashisu was in love with him. But Misao became aware of this when Mashisu helped snap him back to his senses when he was prepared to go down with the Choubimaru during Ryoko's attack and she had shielded him with her body during an explosion.

It was then Mashisu, who had apparently suffered a fatal injury, reminded Misao that they originally met, when Misao had accidentally hit her with a tennis ball and he admitted that he had apologized for what he did back then, although she was too lovestruck to have heard it and that she was happy to have been introduced to Misao's family. Misao realized that he couldn't forgive himself if Mashisu had died because she was important to him. Luckily, the destroyed section of the Choubimaru, as well as Mashisu's injuries, were an illusion created by Washu on Tsunami-fune, which was borrowed by Seto to show Misao that it is Mashisu and not Mihoshi that he should protect. When Mashisu ran off in embarrassment, Misao was convinced by Noike, Ayeka, Sasami, Washu and Seto to go after her, but Misao accidentally stepped on Mihoshi's face by mistake when he went after her.

After the Choubimaru incident, Misao, along with grandfather Minami and Mashisu, were brought before his great-aunt Mikami, and got a punishment of ten years service in one of the family's ventures. Misao accepted his punishment gracefully, but not wanting to be separated from his beloved Mashisu had asked her to marry him. Minami at first objected to this, saying that Mashisu was unworthy, but Misao married her when Misao's mother Mitoto brought the announcement of the family council's support for their wedding, as well as Seto's offer to adopt Mashisu, so that she could be worthy of marrying Misao.

Misao also made an appearance in GXP episodes 23 and 24. By then, Misao's punishment was modified and he became an officer in the Galaxy Army. Misao had also had gained greater confidence in his abilities. After Seina Yamada was accused of stealing the Kamidake II, when he was ordered to turn it over to the Galaxy Army, Misao with his unit had detained his former teacher Amane Kaunaq (Amane had trained Misao and still refers to him as "Rookie"), as well as Kiriko Masaki, Ryoko Balta and Neju Ne Melmas, under the charge that they were accomplices. But unknown to them, Misao was secretly working undercover for Mikami to expose a rogue faction of the G.A. that was aiding the space pirate Tarant Shank, to learn the secret of Fuku, the cabbit that powered the Kamidake II. This showed when Misao allowed the girls to stay in a castle owned by the Kuramitsu family on planet Seniwa that had a computer which they could use to solve the case.

Right after Seina had defeated Tarant, Misao went to report back to his corrupt G.A. superiors, but had actually brought Mikami and an armed escort of G.A. officers to arrest them.

==== Sabato ====
Sabato
- Tenchi Muyo! character
- Voiced by: Houchu Ohtsuka (Japanese); John DeMita (English)

In-universe information
- Alias: Operative A

Operative A (Sabato) (冴羽人, Sabato) is a fictional character in the Tenchi Muyo! series, exclusive to the 1996 movie Tenchi the Movie: Tenchi Muyo in Love.

Sabato is a special operative within the Galaxy Police, assigned to deal with serious criminals. He was a survivor when Kain broke free of his bonds and destroyed the GP Headquarters, drawn back to 1970 with Kain by the fugitive's energy. Aware of Kain's vendetta against those with the Jurai power - namely Achika Masaki and her father Yosho - he watches the former more out of feelings of retribution than her own well-being, waiting for Kain to make his move so he may kill the criminal himself.

Posing in a human disguise to hide his Wau features, Sabato was keeping an eye on Achika by posing as a student in her class. When Ryoko noticed what he was doing, she eventually confronted him and Sabato revealed his true identity to her by identifying that he knew her criminal status. After explaining everything to Ryoko, Sabato then pointed out that he will catch her after he is done with Kain. Sabato made a vain attempt to kill Kain during his attack on Achika at Tokyo Tower, and he was easily killed by him.

Sabato possessed a cybernetic left arm, which could be modified, depending on what opponent he faced. When he confronted Ryoko, it was a simple blaster easily disguised as a normal hand. However, when he faced Kain, Sabato had a more powerful laser cannon mounted to it.

==== Mashisu Makibi ====
Mashisu Makibi (later Mashisu Kuramitsu)
- Tenchi Muyo! GPX character
- Voiced by: Japanese; Keiko Onodera; English; Lara Cody; Kari Wahlgren (credited as Renee Emerson, GXP)

In-universe information
- Relatives: Misao Kuramitsu (husband); Mihoshi Kuramitsu (sister-in-law); Seto Kamiki Jurai (adoptive mother); Mitoto Kuramitsu (mother-in-law)

Mashisu Makibi is a fictional character in the anime series Tenchi Muyo! Ryo-Ohki, as well as Episode 17 of Tenchi Muyo! GXP: Galaxy Police Transporter.

Background

Mashisu Makibi first appeared in Episode 16 of the third Tenchi OVA as Misao Kuramitsu's assistant on board the Kuramitsu family's newest starship, the Choubimaru, which had the capacity to destroy an entire planet. But Mashisu was not Misao's first choice for second-in-command: he had requested Noike Kamiki Jurai for that post, but at the last second, Mikami Kuramitsu had Mashisu fill-in.

Mashisu deeply wishes for Misao not to go through with his terrible plan, which was to use the Choubimaru to rescue Mihoshi Kuramitsu and the Jurai Royal Family from Tenchi Masaki's clutches (as Misao saw it), then in a battle with Ryoko, the ship's main battery would 'malfunction' and blow up Earth and killing Tenchi in the process. Mashisu, knowing that the early civilization residents of Earth were liable to go into a panic seeing a spaceship the size of Earth's moon approaching the planet (in actuality, the letter which informed Misao of Mihoshi's "plight" was altered by Z, in the hopes this incident would occur), tried to reason with Misao to modify his plans, if not for himself, but to spare the pain of having Mihoshi resent Misao because of Tenchi's death. She even went as far as spanking Misao, mostly to spare him the embarrassment of being seen by his crew with a black eye.

Unable to dissuade Misao from his plans, Mashisu secretly came up with an alternate plan by framing Ryoko Hakubi for the destruction of the Choubimaru. What it involved was that she, along with her subordinates Baguma, Fujimasa, and Sorunaru, would cause the ship's destruction by provoking Ryoko (using some minor offenses still on her record as a justification; her major crimes were deleted) to attack it. During the battle, the ship's core would accidentally overload and explode. This way, she could avoid having to destroy the Earth, not to mention avoid hurting both Misao and Mihoshi over Tenchi's death. Baguma, Fujimasa and Sorunaru were then dispatched to handle Ryoko, Ayeka, and Washu, while Mashisu would go after Sasami.

A plan gone wrong

However, Ryoko, Ayeka (with Ryo-Ohki's help) and Washu were easily able to handle Fujimasa, Sorunaru and Baguma respectively, while Sasami easily defeated Mashisu with skills that Mashisu was ill-equipped to handle, and helped her notice that she is in love with Misao. The group was then taken on board Sasami's ship, Tsunami-fune. It was on board Tsunami-fune that Seto Jurai treated the five to an impromptu party, which involved plenty of the rare libation Shinju sake

However, when Ryoko began attacking the Choubimaru in a drunken rage (she had consumed an entire barrel of sake after her battle with Fujimasa, and the Choubimaru was no match for Ryo-Ohki anyway), Mashisu became so concerned about Misao's safety that she rushed back to his side. Mashisu confronted Misao on the Choubimaru's bridge, and was able to help him come to his senses and order the crew to abandon ship. However, it took a little longer for Mashisu to persuade Misao to join the crew... which resulted in Misao trying to shield Mashisu from an explosion.

Apparently injured fatally by the blast, Mashisu helped Misao remember the day they had first met and she fainted admitting that she is in love with Misao. On that day, Misao had accidentally hit Mashisu on the head with a tennis ball. Although Misao had appoligized for the incident, Mashisu was so enraptured with the young boy she did not hear the apology, and gave Misao a vicious headlock as a result. But afterward, Misao had invited Mashisu to lunch with his family, where she met Mihoshi. She also made mention of an unknown incident (possibly the one that caused Mihoshi's downfall within the Galaxy Police) which caused Misao to mature.

However Mashisu's injuries were actually an illusion created by Washu on Tsunami-fune, to help Misao understand the importance of who he should protect. Mashisu, as well as Misao, were surprised to find that the 'explosion' was actually a transport beam, and Mashisu was embarrassed that everyone had heard them and her confession to Misao.

A future with the Kuramitsu family

After a modified resolution to the Z incident, Mashisu was punished by Mikami Kuramitsu with six months of toilet cleaning in the G.P. headquarters for her part in the Choubimaru incident. When Misao wanted to have Mashisu with him for his portion of the punishment (ten years working in one of the family's ventures, however only one's spouse is allowed to go to the family venture), she was dismissed by Mikami's brother Minami Kuramitsu as "unworthy". However, Seto, who was also present, offered to adopt Mashisu so that she could marry Misao. This part was confirmed when Misao and Mihoshi's mother Mitoto (mop in hand) showed up and informed everyone that she got the Kuramitsu Family's counsel to accept the marriage.

Mashisu also appears in GXP episode 15. After her punishment for the Choubimaru incident had ended, she married Misao and became Mashisu Kuramitsu. Apparently as a wedding present, Mashisu was given command of the Choubimaru, with Misao going to the Galaxy Army. She was able to help out when Fuku had taken command of the Kamidake II when she ran away to Earth. Mashisu was enraged when the Kamidake II was attacked by pirates of the Daluma guild, frightening Fuku to tears. Mashisu, along with help from Fuku's big sister Ryo-Ohki, chased off the pirates.

==== Mitoto Kuramitsu ====
Mitoto Kuramitsu
- Tenchi Muyo! GPX character
- Voiced by: Yūko Mizutani (Japanese); Kari Wahlgren (credited as Renee Emerson in GXP, English)

In-universe information
- Relatives: Washu Hakubi (great-grandmother); Minami Kuramitsu (father); Nakita Kuramitsu (husband); Mihoshi Kuramitsu (daughter); Misao Kuramitsu (son); Mashisu Kuramitsu (daughter-in-law)

Mitoto Kuramitsu (九羅密 美兎跳, Kuramitsu Mitoto) is a fictional character in the anime series Tenchi Muyo! GXP: Galaxy Police Transporter.

Background

Unfailing cheerful, Mitoto Kuramitsu is the daughter of Minami Kuramitsu, as well as the mother of Mihoshi and Misao Kuramitsu. Mitoto works as sanitation engineer (read: cleaning lady) for the Galaxy Police. She met Seina Yamada when he was first taken from Earth to the G.P. Academy, and was taken by Seina's crew-cut, which she constantly pets. Since then, Mitoto would be occasionally popping into Seina's life from time-to-time, often helping him out during certain events in the boy's life (like the time Seiryo Tennan held up Seina's body enhancements so that the boy could wash-out, where she supervised Seiryo in cleaning toilets as part of his punishment).

Mitoto shares certain traits with her daughter Mihoshi, namely her odd luck and carefree, yet clueless attitude. Also, Mitoto seems to have the odd habit of appearing in places where she is least expected: sometimes on a G.P. battle cruiser or a pirate ship, where she would be cleaning away without a care in the world; she even appears for a moment on board the original Kamidake, but is taken for an illusion brought on because at that time the crew are starving for lack of food.

There is a running joke that she knows almost everyone in the galaxy because she cleans for them. She has even been in General Daluma's "secret" fortress, and remarked on the cleanliness of its floors.

Other than appearing in the GXP series, Mitoto also made a brief appearance in the final episode of the third Tenchi Muyo OVA series, when she approved of Misao's proposal to Mashisu Makibi and had convinced the Kuramitsu family council to approve of the wedding.

==== Fuku ====
Fuku
- Tenchi Muyo! GXP character
- Voiced by: Tomoko Kaneda (Japanese); Lara Cody (credited as Deanna Morris in GXP, English)

In-universe information
- Species: Cabbit
- Gender: Female
- Relatives: Washu Hakubi (mother/creator, OAV); Tsunami (aunt, OAV); Tokimi (aunt, OAV); Sasami Masaki Jurai (adopted aunt by assimilation to Tsunami, OAV); Ryoko Hakubi (half-sister, OAV); Minagi (manga adopted sister - Ryoko's clone), Seina Yamada (Husband/Master); Yoshiko Yamada (Sister-in-Law)

Fuku (福) is a fictional character in the anime series Tenchi Muyo! GXP: Galaxy Police Transporter.

Background

Fuku first appeared in the episode "Neju Who?". She is a cabbit, a small, rabbit-like creature that hatched from an egg in the Kamidake II, Seina Yamada's ship and was given her name by Seina himself. She is the younger sister of Ryo-Ohki, the daughter of Washu. Like Ryo-Ohki she is the biological computer-unit and, at first, the principle power source of the Kamidake II, which can fluctuate depending upon the mood of Fuku. Her appearance is identical to her sister's when she first hatched in the 3rd episode of the OVA. One characteristic that distinguishes her from Ryo-Ohki is the small bell on her neck which she received from Seina. She later shared this responsibility when Kiriko Masaki Jurai was bonded to the second-generation tree Miyuki, which gave Fuku help in powering the Kamidake II to battle against the Unko of the Good Luck Fleet.

Fuku is deeply devoted to Seina, and that devotion is clearly demonstrated by her willingness to help him, despite the fact that sometimes she can be easily frightened. Seina was also the first one to truly care for her by paying attention to her and demonstrating his faith in her, and Fuku also has a good relationship with Neju Na Melmas and hangs around with her when she is not with Seina. She also shares her big sister's love of carrots. Washu also explained to Seina that although Fuku is incapable of transforming into a human-like form like Ryo-Ohki could, Fuku could with the proper raising be able to gain this ability as well.

Fuku, as well as the Kamidake II, were also briefly taken away by a corrupt faction of the Galaxy Army that were aiding Tarant Shank in order to analyze her for their own personal desires and placed Fuku into a stasis field. The G.A. scientists attempted to clone Fuku, but could only produce imperfect clones. Eventually Seina was able to rescue Fuku, as well as the clones.

Fuku also made a brief appearance in Tenchi Muyo! Ryo-Ohki, when at the end of the nineteenth episode, she accompanies Noike Jurai, who alters the message to Mihoshi's family (that Z had originally altered) in order to keep the timeline in correct order, so Noike would be able to meet Tenchi and Fuku (who also did not want the timeline adversely affected) would eventually meet Seina.

One thing to note, is that the cabbit appearance Ryo-Ohki adopted resulted from Ryoko integrating the remains of Neko-chan, a little cat she had been keeping alive after it had died before Tenchi released her. So while Ryo-Ohki's appearance is a side-effect of the integration, Fuku's own was modeled after the integrated Ryo-Ohki.

=== Manga Only ===
==== Dark Washu ====
Dark Washu/Tama
- Tenchi Muyo! character

In-universe information
- Alias: The Dark Crystal
- Nickname: Tama
- Species: Artificial construct

Dark Washu (闇の鷲羽, Yami-no-Washū) is a fictional character in Tenchi Muyo!, a recurring character in Hitoshi Okuda's The All-New Tenchi Muyō! manga series, published in the U.S. by VIZ Media.

Origins

Dark Washu began her life as the "Dark Crystal", a device which Washū Hakubi created approximately 5,000 years prior to the events of Tenchi Muyō! Ryō-Ohki. The Dark Crystal was a self-evolving artificial intelligence program with the rather unusual purpose of attacking its own creator by any means it could devise, in order to provide a worthy opponent to test the "perfect" security system that Washū was attempting to create. When Washū was sealed away by Kagato, the Dark Crystal had not yet been activated. However, it was discovered by Washū's jealous colleague Doctor Clay, who subverted the system to pursue his own grudge against her. When his attempt to abduct Washū on behalf of Tokimi was thwarted, just before being delivered to a Galaxy Police prison, he activated the Dark Crystal with orders to kill Washū. Shortly after its activation, the Dark Crystal reconfigured itself into an android copy of Washū, except with dark skin, purple eyes, and pale purple hair. This gave her most if not all of Washū's superhuman powers, theoretically allowing for an even contest. She also claimed that her personality was a copy of Washū's.

Rather than attempting to attack Washū in secret, "Dark Washu" (as it called itself) instead openly announced her presence and intent. She followed this up almost immediately by attempting to kill Washū with a garrote, and then with a hand-held energy cannon. After being physically assaulted by Ryōko for the second attack (which if successful would have killed Tenchi as well), Dark Washū concluded that a continuation of direct attacks would soon destroy the Earth, and instead proposed a best of five competition between herself (and four duplicates) and Washū's "team", with the type of contest in each round being randomly determined. The first round, a cooking contest, was easily won by Sasami, but Dark Washu cheated to defeat Ayeka and Ryōko in a shōjo manga trivia contest and a foot race, respectively. Mihoshi tied the competition in a contest of drawing lots, leading to the final round: hand to hand combat between Washū and Dark Washū. Dark Washū used deceptive tactics, such wearing boxing gloves to present the impression of a boxing match and then using kicks, but was still defeated by her creator. She then conceded defeat and exposed a shut-off switch to Washū.

However, at this point an orbital satellite left behind by Doctor Clay fired on Washū, and while it was promptly destroyed by Ryōko, the satellite placed a more sinister personality, a copy of Clay contained within his removed left eye, in control of Dark Washū's body. Clay told Washū that he would continue attacking the entire Masaki household unless she would erase their memories and confront Dark Washū alone on Europa. Though Washū obeyed this demand, Minagi arrived on Earth shortly afterward and was able to get Tenchi, Ryōko, and Mihoshi to remember Washū's existence. They arrived on Europa just in time to prevent Dark Washū from inflicting a killing blow. Afterward, Dark Washū's true personality was able to reassert itself, weakening Clay's hold, and Washū defeated her with a German suplex. Clay's copy attempted to retaliate with a proton bomb, but Washū had already disarmed it. Minagi then destroyed Clay's eye, eliminating the copy forever. When Washū expressed reluctance to deactivate Dark Washū, the android grabbed her hand and forced her to do so.

Tama

Following Dark Washū's defeat, Washū repaired and reprogrammed her as Tama (玉) to serve as a lab assistant. Tama appeared to be a smaller, more childlike version of Dark Washū and wore a red and white maid's outfit. When questioned as to why she had restored the former villain, Washū responded that "cute characters don't grow on trees", implying that this was done largely on a whim. This was supported by the fact that she installed a very powerful self-destruct device in Tama-chan because "it seemed amusing".

Tama-chan generally got along well with the other members of the Masaki household, but behaved antagonistically toward Ryōko, seeming to mimic Ryōko's own behavior toward Ayeka. Ryōko challenged Tama-chan to a fight, with the loser being required to leave forever. However, Tama's self-destruct device was accidentally activated, causing her to forfeit the fight and flee into deep space. Upon realizing the reason for Tama's actions, Ryōko pursued her and sliced Tama-chan in half, leaving behind her lower body (which contained the bomb) and bringing back her head and upper body to be repaired by Washū. Though Ryōko was still annoyed by Tama's attempts to steal her food, she no longer objected to the girl's presence. Tama-chan has since played a minimal role in the story.

==== Garyu ====
Garyu is a brief villain in the No Need for Tenchi graphic novel series by Hitoshi Okuda. He appears in the volumes Ayeka's Heart and No Need for Endings. Garyu is the prince of the distant planet called Oku II. Garyu kidnapped Ayeka from Earth through hyperspace and the Tenchi gang began their search for their beloved Ayeka.

The motive for this kidnapping is that Garyu has a burning passion for Ayeka, the origins of this come from when he visits Jurai on a diplomatic trip. Garyu criticizes that Jurains are foolish to keep trees and plants for aesthetics and oxygen saying they take up too much space. Two children were playing with their pet bird nearby and the bird flew towards Garyu. Garyu without hesitation smashes the bird to the ground. Ayeka sees this and demands Garyu to apologize. Garyu senses Ayeka's strength and presence intrigues him but he refuses to apologize. Ayeka furious walks up to him and slaps him in the face. This was the first time he had ever been hit. Everyone had always feared his power and ability but not Ayeka. He has never stopped thinking of Ayeka ever since and his passion for her brings him to kidnap her and brainwash her to love him.

==== Mikamo and Yataka ====
Mikamo & Yataka
- Tenchi Muyo! character

Mikamo (箕鳧) and Yataka (耶鷹) are fictional characters in the Tenchi Muyo! franchise, currently exclusive to Hitoshi Okuda's No Need for Tenchi! manga series, published in the U.S. by VIZ Media

An unequal partnership

Yataka is officially a "space pirate", though it might be more fitting to refer to him as a "space hijacker" - a crook among crooks who scavenges others' quarry after they've done the lay-work for him. While he puts on fierce airs, Yataka is not truly cut out for the pirating business, as while he is a liar and a thief he's on occasion too timid to kill in fear of the attention it might draw from the Galaxy Police or the Jurai Royal Family. Despite all this, he has an inflated opinion of himself and his abilities, and is quick to belittle others and suffer for his underestimations.

Mikamo is his traveling companion, a sentient robot who acts as A.I. of their spaceship. Yataka likes to think of himself and the machine as partners, but Mikamo has his own agenda: he agrees to play along with the pirate, their deal being "Yataka takes as many things as he wants and Mikamo will enjoy its little hobbies"... that being torture and dissection. Though Yataka poses as the group's spokesperson, Mikamo is the real power behind the scenes, having the thief completely at his mercy.

Business arrangements

They intercept Ryoko and the others as they journey through space, Mikamo uncovering that they're after an awesome treasure - a Juraian Royal Tree she failed to acquire eight hundred years ago when she was under Kagato's control (Ryoko's only known failure aside from her raid on Jurai). Though blasted by Ryo-Ohki, a transmitter placed on the ship leads them to an uncharted planet shielded from outside tampering and discovery. Mikamo fires on Tenchi and the others from above as Yataka makes good his plan to steal the tree, only to meet up with the tree's guardian Ibara. The pirate's ridicule of others based on first impressions gets him in trouble again, and he flees when he see his technology is helpless against a "piece of stick".

His partner has substantially better luck: Mikamo cloaks itself as Sasami and feigns distress to draw the girl's sister Ayeka into striking distance. Its foul play gaining them a hostage, Mikamo orders Yataka to tell the group they have three hours to hand over the treasure for the princess, elsewise the robot might appease its sick urges. However, Mikamo schemes to have its fun even after obtaining the prize, going so far as threatening Yataka at knifepoint for suggesting otherwise.

Before either can go back on the bargain, Washu devises a way to neutralize their ship's shield, allowing Ryoko to teleport inside. Mikamo takes a cheap shot to try to atomize both women as she and Ayeka quibble over the rescue, before at last bristling over Yataka mewling there was no reason to do such a thing. "Tired of baby-sitting poser criminals", Mikamo decides to slaughter his "useless partner" but is blasted mid-stance by Ryoko, blowing a hole through the A.I. and the side of the ship.

Last resorts

Mikamo grows increasingly enraged as he fires repeatedly from orbit, his attempts at reprisal blocked by Tenchi and his Light-Hawk Wings. When Ayeka, Ryoko and Ibara take out his gun torrents the machine grows even more adamant, choosing to sacrifice itself and the ship by bringing it down on his enemies' heads. Through the power of the Light-Hawk Wings working in tandem with Ryoko and her gems, their combined strength halts Mikamo's kamikaze effort, able to stop even the mass of the falling starship.

Unrelenting, the vengeful A.I. chooses to take itself down and drag Tenchi and the others to hell with him, initiating the ship's self-destruct sequence. Taking his frustrations out on Yataka (long past ready to throw in the towel), Mikamo screams at his uselessness as a pawn, although he's quick to stop in the face of something even more maddening - Tenchi wanting to put an end to the fighting by daring to show him mercy.

The countdown reaches zero, and as the ship explodes Ryoko and Tenchi take the full brunt of the impact. Collectively they're able to smash the extraordinary amount of mass into harmless particles instantaneously, saving the planet and everyone on it. Still functional, the machine makes one final play for murder but is ultimately destroyed by Ryoko, as "some guys just don't know when to quit".

His eminence, "Lord Yataka", survives the ordeal, though after being betrayed, losing his ship, and getting blown up and taken into custody hardly gets off easy.

==== Minagi ====
Minagi
- Tenchi Muyo! character

In-universe information
- Species: Synthetic composite being
- Relatives: Yakage ("father"); Washu Hakubi ("mother"); Ryoko Hakubi ("sister - clone")

Minagi (巫薙) is a fictional character in Tenchi Muyo!, a recurring character in Hitoshi Okuda's No Need for Tenchi! and The All-New Tenchi Muyo! manga series, published in the U.S. by VIZ Media.

Minagi's name is taken from the Minagi railway station in Japan.

Origins

Minagi looks almost exactly like Ryoko (with the exception of two crescent-shaped scars across her cheeks), and for good reason - from a genetic standpoint she could be considered the space pirate's daughter. However, she considers herself more a younger sister than anything else. Minagi was created artificially when Yakage, an apprentice of Washu, stole a sample of Ryoko's DNA and spliced it with his own. While similar in both appearance and abilities to her "mother", the two couldn't be any more different in personality: Minagi is highly enthusiastic, polite to a fault, and shows no interest in alcohol. They do share one important quality, however; both women are devoted to those they love unto death.

She acts as Yakage's protégé and servant, confronting Tenchi and the others shortly after their battle with Kagato at her master's behest. She suffers from amnesia after a tussle with Ryoko as a result, but while recuperating befriends the entire group. She and Sasami share a particularly close bond. Minagi regains her memory while fighting Yakage, wanting to keep her newfound friends out of danger and remember her past. While very hurt she doesn't mind dying at her master's hand, pleased to have done what she could to help her father create the perfect sword (unknowingly, one Yakage meant for Minagi to wield).

She survives the encounter, and now decides to follow in Ryoko's footsteps as a space pirate while still living by Yakage's teachings. However, her activities are more akin to the stories of Zorro or Robin Hood than to Ryoko's former career, targeting "bad cargo ships and government officers" (sic).

Space pirate?

Unfortunately, Minagi is still often mistaken for her notorious sister, with a case of mistaken identity with Asahi Takebe getting her involved in an issue with Yume and The Shima Brothers. Yakage had come into possession of one of the three Hielzen-S swords ("Kageba, the Shadow Blade"), but the sword was taken from him by Hishima, who had threatened Minagi's life lest it was handed over. Upon trying to retrieve it, the current owner Yume was unsympathetic to the past wishes of a dead man, ordering Hishima to dissuade Minagi by force. Though she survived the incident she is severely hurt trying to save Asahi's ship, but is well enough to recover under Washu's care (with the generous "donations" of blood and marrow from Ryoko helping matters further).

Minagi later captures an animal smuggler who was en route to deliver a Mitsu, and also helps the gang remember Washu, who under the orders of the Dr. Clay controlled Dark Washu had sealed their memories of her to cause her distress. Following Ryo-Ohki's signal to Europa, they eventually confront Dark Washu together, and after Washu defeats her robot copy, the missing left eye of Clay that acted as his back-up breaks away, only to be destroyed by Minagi for the harm its caused her friends.

Other versions

Clones of Ryoko have popped up several times in Tenchi Muyo! animation and literature over the years. The original OVA series Tenchi Muyo! Ryo-Ohki later used the concept for Zero. In 1997, an American comic published by Pioneer wrote of a more sinister offshoot named "Inferno".

==== The Shima Brothers ====
The Shima Brothers
- Tenchi Muyo! character

The Shima Brothers are a fictional trio of villains in the Tenchi Muyo! franchise, featured in Hitoshi Okuda's No Need for Tenchi! and The All-New Tenchi Muyo! manga series, licensed and distributed in the U.S. by VIZ Media.

Origins

They are henchmen in the service of Yume, an old classmate and rival of Washu's during her academy days. The Shimas owe their existence to Yume, having been bio-engineered by the scientist to serve her purposes; and so are utterly devoted to their master and her goals. Together they initiated a series of events to acquire the fabled Jurai Book of Secrets, manipulating the Tree Sculptor of Jurai's Royal Family Tatetsuki's strings from behind the scenes and using his authority to their advantage. They are as committed to each other as they are to Yume, and are able to pass on their core units (devices recording their past experiences and skills) in death. Each brother is completely cloaked, save for a mask and their hands when they attack.

Mushima

Mushima is the oldest of the three and wears a dark green cloak to distinguish himself from his kin. His body is thin, with exposed wires running across his bladed fingers and a mask that only reveals his right eye (left in the flipped English manga). While comparatively squat by his siblings' standards (roughly the size of an adult human), Mushima's arms have extraordinary reach for his frame, as he uses them to slash opponents with great speed with his claws.

He is originally stationed on Ryuten, a sister planet to Jurai, the world that governs the universe. Mushima pleads permission from his brother Hishima to go on assignment to capture Asahi Takebe; a young woman who would prove useful as a bargaining chip to wring information out of her father. Given leave so long as Asahi's brought back alive and unhurt, Mushima is all too happy to go: while nauseated by the "stink" of the tree-planet, he hopes to gain enough favor in completing the mission to eventually usurp control.

Tracking Asahi's ship Mimasaka's co-ordinates to Earth, Mushima curses the waste of talent like his on such a backwater planet. But after being made a fool of by Katsuhito Masaki while trying to ascertain Asahi's whereabouts, Mushima reveals the last wrinkle in his genetic make-up - his body is host to two personalities, one a scheming, disreputable dirt-bag, and the other that of an honorable warrior who enjoys fighting those superior to himself. His right arm is severed in the ensuing fight, though Mushima leaves without incident - he compliments Katsuhito on his skill and hopes one day their paths and blades will cross again.

Mushima finally tracks down his quarry in space, before long backhanding Asahi in a shot meant for Ayeka. As he chortles to himself on how he's gone against orders, the act draws the wrath of the monk Gohgei, who transforms to reveal himself as a Gagutian, a nearly extinct bestial race of great speed and power. Shifting back to his second persona, Mushima swears to leave the group alone in peace should he fail; it has long been his life's dream to trade blows with a Gagutian.

Ultimately, Mushima falls. Though at first insulted, Gohgei assures the creature he means him no slight by not finishing the job; had Mushima's arm been in top condition, the outcome might have been different. Conceding total defeat, Mushima asks forgiveness for having raised a hand against the ladies, and Gohgei asks they meet and fight once more when they are both in top physical condition.

Grievously injured from scrapes with two accomplished warriors in so short a time, Mushima uses the last of his strength to return to his brothers. He refuses repair, as "a shattered weapon, no matter how completely restored, has flaws that will eventually reveal themselves", instead sinking his claw deep within his chest and pulling out his core. He asks Hishima to accept it into his own, and thus, satisfied, leaps to his death on Ryuten. His younger brother swears that, through him, Mushima will fight again.

Hishima

Hishima is at the center in both age and height, but out strides all others in terms of power. He is visibly humanoid, clad in red with a mask that only reveals his left eye (right in the flipped English manga). His true lineage is kept under wraps until the final battle of their story arc. Hishima has a personal code of ethics he always tries to hold to, so long it doesn't interfere with his master Yume's wishes: he has strong feelings of honor and fair play, avoids killing if at all possible, and believes in keeping one's word and not attacking the helpless or the weak. However, should his master give an order that differs with his usual guideline they will be dropped, as requests from Yume are absolute.

While Yume slept within Bizen, Hishima headed preparations for her takeover of Jurai. He first acquires one of the three legendary Hielzen-S swords (weapons forged with a will) from the scientist Yakage, who had wanted to research "The Shadow Blade Kageba" to help reach his own aspirations. Yakage's daughter Minagi blames herself for its loss, as the swordsmith hands it over to facilitate her safety after Hishima threatens her life. He then finds the perfect foil for obtaining the Juraian files in Tatesuki, a man resentful of Nomori Takebe being given the title of Royal Tree Sculptor other than himself. By exploiting Tatetsuki's jealousy, Hishima uses hypnosis to control him like a puppet: Nomori is framed for the previous sculptor's death and locked away until he divulges the hidden files' location. Attempts are made to track down and seize Takebe's daughter Asahi as a hostage, while all traffic from Ryuten is closed off from Jurai, a second Shima, Mushimas takes on the task of finding the girl personally.

Hishima maintains order until Mushima returns, fatally wounded over the course of battle. At his brother's request, Hishima takes his core into himself, inheriting his soul, speed, and thirst for another battle with Gohgei. Finally, Asahi comes into their keeping when she is caught unawares when Tenchi and the others attempt a rescue. Nomori admits the secrets are kept within his daughter's spaceship Mimasaka under duress, as Hishima only observes Gohgei - the circumstances are hardly conducive to a fair contest. On board, Tatesuki uses the last of his reason to fight off Hishima's mental hold and keep from breaking the seals that bind them, forcing the creature to get physical and plunge his finger into the back of the pawn's head, now asserting total control.

Their captives escape in the resulting commotion, but Hishima has Takashima leave them be - the violence is unnecessary; they've got what they came for. Shortly thereafter, Yume awakes, but rather than being grateful for her underlings' work in her absence she's cold, belittling their efforts in the face of her own abilities, not their own. Minagi confronts them and asks they return her late master's sword, a request Yume is unwilling to acquiesce. The command is then given to Hishima to attack. The creatures asks that she reconsider, to forget the sword and go: "to end your life over an obligation to the dead -- it's a meaningless act". However, Hishima cannot disobey orders, and when Minagi refuses to give in ("fighting for someone important to you is never meaningless!") he's forced to strike her down, hoping to one day be forgiven.

Hishima finally gets permission to settle accounts with Gohgei when Washu and Yume agree to a physical contest to resolve their age-old bet. His true nature is unveiled as to why he is Yume's masterwork - Hishima is a walking war machine based on the Gagutian life form. He is able to take the abilities of his opponents and make them his own, and - as a self-evolving mechanism with Mushima's added agility and skills - Hishima enhances those techniques as such where they always surpass the original.

Tenchi stands to shield Gohgei from a final attack, and on seeing the heir to Jurai Hishima recalls one like him through Hishima - Katsuhito. He accepts Gohgei's concession of defeat - as the monk now means to protect the person important to him, Asahi, regardless of the disgrace - as noble, and fights Tenchi in his stead. Despite his strength, Hishima is unable to duplicate the Light Hawk Wings, and the warrior is consequently thrown into Bizen, causing the tree to cave and its systems to malfunction. He works together with the others to help right his and Yume's wrongs and save the galaxy from what could have been total collapse as a result. After seeing the death of Takashima and how Hishima cares for her, Yume relents on her past doings, realizing how lonely she truly was. He is no longer treated as just another disposable minion, but as an equal and valued friend.

He and Yume make several other appearances in the series, first invited to an onsen by Washu. Hishima informs his master on the finer points of the "cleansing ritual" at a hot spring, though he himself is baffled on why someone proper like Ayeka would be averse to seeing him in the buff, writing off his lumps as just another part of the bathing ceremony. Later, the two gather intelligence and help to oppose Sara, an A.I. who became a threat to Washu and the others.

Takashima

Takashima is the youngest and tallest of the Shimas. He drapes a blue cloak over his bulky, cybernetic build, with a mask that reveals no facial features, not even his eyes. He is mostly silent and a follower, communicating only via unintelligible shouts of "glah".

He accompanies Hishima throughout their task on Ryuten, doing what he can to procure the secret files of the Jurai Royal Family for his master. It is Takashima who rips the information free of its place on Mimasaka, allowing Yume the ability to control the royal tree Bizen. Later, he shocks both his brother and creator by showing he can speak, stepping in to avenge the late Mushima by fighting Gohgei. But the latter has grown even stronger since then, and Takashima is quickly dispatched, knocked aside with one blow.

Damning her fallen creation for shaming her, Yume plants a kick to the scruff of the "worthless bucket of bolts" neck, calling him little more than a pawn and pile of rubbish. Even so, when Bizen is toppled during the climactic scuffle between Hishima and Tenchi, Takashima rises to save Yume, taking all the weight of the falling tree on his neck and back. Before they give out (a result of the prior kick), Takashima shoves Yume to safety, sacrificing himself for her protection. Yume is distraught over the loss: she had never meant for anyone to give their lives for hers.

==== Yakage ====
Yakage
- Tenchi Muyo! character

Yakage (矢蔭) is a fictional character in the Tenchi Muyo! franchise and the first major antagonist of Hitoshi Okuda's No Need for Tenchi! manga series, published in the U.S. by VIZ Media.

Swordsmith He is a Juraian scientist who specialized in swords and swordplay, and even designed the energy sword used by Ryoko. Like Kagato, Yakage studied under Washu as one of her personal assistants at the Galactic Academy, but possessed a greater sense of honor and loyalty than the future "Ruins Buster". Despite this, he was not without ambition or obsession, and Yakage became immersed into creating a sword of immense power, one that would be strong enough to even overcome the Lighthawk Wings.

To reach that goal, Yakage abandons Washu, stealing some of Ryoko's DNA and mixing it with his own. He began raising and training his Ryoko, named Minagi, to be a superior warrior, planning for her to be the wielder of this "ultimate sword". Though harsh - and on occasion, brutal - in his teachings, Yakage genuinely cares for Minagi, only wanting his daughter to be prepared for whatever trials she might face in the future. The full extents of his research are still unknown, but he did discover many powerful blades, some so valuable they were sought by others themselves (and subsequently taken from his possession). The culmination of his work was a dual-bladed, artificial Lighthawk Sword.

Yakage managed to stay for thousands of years to further his studies by cloning himself each time he was near death, training Minagi in the ways of swordsmanship all the while. However, the cloning wasn't perfect, making each version of the scientist weaker than the last. Cell degeneration had set in, and with Yakage growing sickly - bad off enough to suffer spurts of coughing up blood at points - Minagi confronted Tenchi and the others on Earth. She attacks them knowing that they were the one who defeated Kagato, thinking research on Tenchi's sword would help her master achieve his greatest wish. However, Minagi was beaten by Ryoko, and was stricken with amnesia as a result.

New test subjects

His protégé missing, Yakage comes to earth along with his two guardians, Kuze and Hakkou, interested in seeing the power of the Lighthawk Sword. During this encounter, Kuze and Hakkou easily dispatched Tenchi, and Yakage, lecturing the boy about his lack of focus, took Ayeka prisoner in order to entice Tenchi into facing him with his full force. Though Yakage is mindful of taking the girl (as she is First Princess of Jurai), as a scientist he must use whatever means are necessary to carry out his research.

Ryoko failed in her attempt to defeat Yakage alone (to keep Tenchi from having to fight him), so Tenchi and the others quickly headed off to Yakage's ship to take him down. Through fighting with him, Minagi's memories gradually return, and after seeing the scar on his face - something Yakage kept as a memento of the first time Minagi bested him in combat - she remembers everything. Minagi allows herself to be cut down by Yakage's final strike, desiring to help achieve his dreams and make her father happy. Yakage had never told her that he only wanted to prove the sword's abilities in combat so he could give it as a gift to her.

Final analysis

Still unwilling to waver with Minagi's sacrifice, Yakage refused to quit until he and Tenchi have a final match, for the sake of both his research and his daughter. The scientist tries to goad the boy into battle by threatening Ayeka and Ryoko's lives, as a shield surrounding them will eventually kill them unless Yakage himself dies first. As they fight, Washu reveals that this Yakage is a copy, as he's been repeating himself millennium after millennium, overwriting his knowledge and appearance until his body could no longer withstand the constant degeneration.

Not wanting to kill Yakage - despite knowing the scientist's life was nearly at its end - Tenchi and his friends were put into serious jeopardy themselves. Ryoko breaks free of her bonds to save Tenchi from Yakage's deathblow, but it is not until the scientist levels his weapon at Ryoko that Tenchi shows his true power. The two then trade sword strokes, with Yakage cleaved in two by the inferiority of his artificial sword against the genuine article. Having done his best as a scientist and warrior, Yakage's only regret is that he won't be able to pass the sword along to Minagi, as he bids the group a final farewell.

==== Yume ====
Yume
- Tenchi Muyo! character

Yume (夢) is a fictional character in Tenchi Muyo!, a recurring character in Hitoshi Okuda's The All-New Tenchi Muyo! manga series, published in the U.S. by VIZ Media.

Yume attended the Jurai Science Academy at the same time as Washu Hakubi. Yume graduated second in their class, with Washu ranked first. Unlike Doctor Clay, Yume was actually considered by Washu to be a legitimate rival whose intelligence was worthy of respect.

In addition to their intellectual competitions, Yume also engaged in drinking contests with Washu at a bar near the Academy. After one of these contests shortly before Washu's capture by Kagato, the highly inebriated geniuses agreed on a contest to see who could conquer the Jurai Empire first, with the loser becoming the winner's slave. While Washu passed out afterward and promptly forgot about this wager, Yume dedicated herself entirely to winning the competition. She created three powerful warriors, the Shima Brothers, to carry out her plan, and stole the 2nd-generation Jurai royal tree Bizen. Yume then placed herself in suspended animation to wait for them to acquire the Jurai Book of Secrets, which contained information she needed to control Bizen's powers.

When the Shima Brothers finally awakened Yume, she was angry that they had taken 7200 hours longer than she had predicted. Yume also declared herself to be "the greatest scientific genius in the universe", a title which Washu also frequently claims. She proceeded with her plans, using information from the Book of Secrets to activate Bizen and launch the enormous tree into space. Mihoshi's spaceship Yukinojo, which had secretly followed her to the planet Ryuten, was the first to encounter Bizen, and was quickly overcome by the tree's Light Hawk Wings. Yume left Yukinojo intact so that Bizen's appearance would become known to Jurai.

In response, Jurai's queens Funaho and Misaki deployed the entire Jurai fleet to recover the stolen tree. However, Washu was able to locate Yume first, and challenges Yume with a new wager: a fighting competition where if Washu wins the previous contest is cancelled, while if Yume wins Washu will become her slave. Instead of fighting herself, as Washu had hoped, Yume instead sent Takashima and Hishima to fight on her behalf. Tenchi and the monk Gohgei volunteered to represent Washu. While Gohgei easily defeated Takashima, he proved no match for Hishima. Tenchi then stepped up to fight Hishima, but their battle was interrupted by the arrival of the Jurai fleet. Yume used Bizen to seize control of the Jurai warships, but Tenchi resumed the fight with Hishima to force her to give up. With his Light Hawk Wings, Tenchi was able to defeat Hishima, causing a large branch from Bizen to fall toward Yume. At the last moment, Takashima sacrificed himself to save his master, leaving Yume distraught, as she had never wanted anyone to die for her.

The damage to Bizen caused the tree to completely lose control, initiating a chain reaction that could potentially destroy the entire universe by detonating itself and all the other royal trees of Jurai. Yume worked together with Washu in an attempt to avert this crisis, and they realized that the only way to stop the chain reaction is to kill Bizen. However, before they could complete their task, an enormous extradimensional energy distortion, resembling a black hole, formed around Bizen. However, at that point Tsunami appeared and averted the crisis. Washu convinced the Jurai queens to allow Yume to go free, and later she and Hishima visited an outdoor onsen on Earth at Washu's invitation (resulting in the onsen being destroyed and rebuilt twice).

Yume and Hishima returned in Volume 8 ("Brain Drain") of The All-New Tenchi Muyo! when they brought a group of Academy underclassmen to meet Washu. Among them was an 18-year-old named Sara, an apparent klutz who immediately challenged Washu to a duel in the Virtual Arena with the condition that the loser would serve the winner. Sara lost and moved into the Masaki house to become Washu's new assistant (displacing Tama). However, Yume became suspicious and investigated Sara, learning that the real Sara had died 1,000 years previously but had been absorbed by a being composed of accumulated data and that the current Sara had a secret agenda involving merging with Washu to obtain the power of a god. Yume transported Tenchi and Ryoko into the Virtual Arena to rescue Washu where they had to battle duplicates of themselves; Washu, bolstered by Tenchi and Ryoko's courage and determination, also fought back against Sara's control. Sara was overwhelmed by emotions left over from the original Sara and allowed her consciousness to be deleted, sending Tenchi, Washo and Ryoko back to the real world. Later, Yume found what was left of the data entity in a corner of Washu's lab.

=== Others ===
==== Asahi Takebe ====
Asahi Takebe
- Tenchi Muyo! character

Asahi Takebe (建部 旭, Takebe Asahi) is a fictional character from the Tenchi Muyo! franchise, a girl with past ties to Juraian princesses Ayeka and Sasami in Hitoshi Okuda's No Need for Tenchi! manga.

Asahi is the only daughter of Nomori Takebe, a master wood sculptor from Ryuten—one of Jurai’s sister planets. Ryuten is known as a luxury resort, but its real importance comes from its massive trees, which are harvested to build the royal family's spacecraft. Craftspeople on the planet carve these ships by hand, and because her father is the master sculptor, he holds the highest authority on the planet.

She first met Ayeka and Sasami when the two princesses visited to the vacation spot, and they all became close friends (with Sasami loving her like a little sister). Always a fool for skilled craftsmanship, Asahi is ready to carve at the drop of the hat, with a veritable barrage of sculpting tools on her person at all times. She's especially attached to Mimasaki, a sentient A.I. and spaceship that she fawns over at all times. Culinary-wise, Asahi in the kitchen is something to be feared, as her dishes tend to be on the nuclear side (five tubes of wasabi a dish for "tang"). Aside from the cook herself, the only person who can stomach Asahi's cuisine is Gohgei, a young monk who watched over her as a child.

Gohgei is actually the only boy her father let Asahi associate with growing up. Nomori smothers her in a way; after her mother died his daughter is all he has in life. To dissuade her from striking up a relationship, he spins yarns on how "all men -- aside from me -- change into scary monsters and eat little girls up!" While she knows it is not true ("since at least a year ago!") Asahi has a psychosomatic allergy as a result, and will pass out if so much as touched by a guy.

Escape from Ryuten Her father was imprisoned by a rival named Tatesuki, over jealousy in not being named royal sculptor in lieu of Nomori after the previous master's death. She's unable to seek help from Jurai after Tatesuki has all traffic to the area closed, and Asahi is sought as leverage to make her father speak by three strange men. Making a break for it, the young girl runs into a snag when she mistakes the "space pirate" Minagi for her more notorious sibling, and she and Mimasaki crashland on Tenchi Masaki's front doorstep.

During the surprising reunion, Asahi fills Ayeka and Sasami in on the current goings-on on Ryuten, and eager to assist, Tenchi and the others set off to free her father from imprisonment. The journey is not without incident, though; Mimasaka is put into a drunken binge by Mihoshi halfway to their destination, forcing an unscheduled stop on Yatsuka (a mining planet in the Jurai Empire). Gohgei is picked up there while the group is detained, and after six hundred years apart the monk and Asahi fall for each other, though neither acts on their crush (Asahi is worried she'll never viewed as anything but a "little sister"/Gohgei is concerned over the age difference and the girl's feelings). Matters are compounded when Mushima tracks them down - though Asahi seems more upset over the scratching of her "pretty ship" than capture - and lashes out towards Ayeka. Asahi pushes the princess out of the way, taking the full force of the creature's backhand. While she's unconscious, Gohgei jumps to her defense, unveiling himself as a beast-like Gagutian.

Curious cures Though saved from Mushima, Asahi is eventually caught and used as collateral to expunge the location on Jurai's secret files from her father. Nomori begrudgingly cooperates, admitting the book is hidden deep within his daughter's ship. Once the files are obtained, she and the others are able to escape, though Mimasaka is left with the Shimas on Ryuten. Minagi, understanding what it is like to lose something precious, puts herself in danger to retrieve it, even as the A.I. concerns itself for her safety.

Thankful for all the sacrifices made by her friends, Asahi decides to stay with Gohgei and do her part to stop Yume, an old acquaintance of Washu's, from taking over the Jurai Empire. Feeling being beside Gohgei was the best protection, she supports everyone even after her father's rescue. During Gohgei's fight with Hishima, the girl wonders why Gohgei doesn't transform, revealing she understood all along ("Oh, don't tell me you didn't know!") allowing the monk to fight to his full potential without fretting how Asahi will hate him.

She is unknowingly cured of her allergy when rushing to Gohgei's aid, and after matters with Yume are finished the couple settles down on Ryuten. She succeeds in her career as a professional carver, with her and Gohgei due to be married in the near-future.

==== Sakuya Kumashiro ====
Sakuya Kumashiro
- Tenchi in Tokyo! character
- Created by: Mayori Sekijima
- Voiced by: Mayumi Iizuka (Japanese); Julie Maddalena (English)

In-universe information
- Relatives: Yugi ("Creator")

Sakuya Kumashiro (神代 佐久耶, Kumashiro Sakuya) is a character from Tenchi in Tokyo / Shin Tenchi Muyo.

History

Sakuya Kumashiro has been rated 3 on Temangu High's "Must Have List" by her male classmates. However, it is newcomer Tenchi Masaki that gets her attention. On one of his first days, she chooses to sit next to him at lunch, much to the envy of the other guys. Over the course of the series, the two become closer, culminating in the school carnival, where the two share a kiss while Ryoko is watching, causing Ryoko to run away for much of the series' remaining episodes.

Sakuya has strong feelings for Tenchi, and, in the end, her love becomes so strong that she cannot bear to be without him. This only gets stronger when Sakuya has a great realization near the end of the series. Yugi keeps a close eye on her, and Sakuya seems to be involved in her plans.

Sakuya goes through a big change when, in a later episode, Tenchi realizes that Sakuya has never spoken about her home, her parents or anything about her past. Sakuya brushes off the question like always, but this time she becomes aware of the fact that she cannot remember anything about herself. In her life, all that has mattered is Tenchi, and she has not thought of any of it.

Sakuya begins breaking down, and clings to Tenchi even tighter. The two spend a great deal of time together, and Sakuya tells Tenchi she loves him, asking him if he loves her. He is unable to answer for the time being and wants longer to think about it.

He does not get much time, though. Yugi, who has been watching her, keeps saying that she does not understand her. The little child cannot comprehend the romantic feelings of the older girl, and the actions it causes. Yugi destroys the crystal in her inner sanctum that represents Sakuya, and Tenchi finds that his school friends have no idea who she is. Tenchi runs off in search of her, but cannot find a trace of her anywhere.

Tenchi returns home and receives a phone call from Sakuya, who has been walking in the city, feeling empty and alone. The two spend the day together in the beach, sharing a kiss there, and Tenchi returns home to find Washu and his grandfather Katsuhito waiting for him. They explain that Washu has made a discovery about Sakuya: she is another persona of Yugi, a shadow or reflection of her as a young woman that she created (although her actions and Yugi's confusion by them shows that Sakuya has a mind of her own). Tenchi refuses to believe it at first, but after Washu shows him her data which is a definitive proof, he runs to Sakuya's house. When he makes it there, he finds Yugi, who had moments before taken Sakuya back into herself after revealing the truth to her.

When Tenchi confronts Yugi, Yugi places him in a dream world, where he can be with Sakuya forever. Distraught upon the loss of Sakuya and his guilt upon confronting the other girls after their fight at the carnival, Tenchi goes along with this after the Sakuya of this world, which is supposedly nothing but Yugi's puppet, speaks to him alternately with Yugi's voice and then her own, and he finds himself unable to hurt Sakuya.

The two share some time together, and Tenchi finally gives Sakuya the answer to the question she had asked earlier: taking her into her arms, he tells her that he's thought about it and realized that he loves her too. They kiss, but this makes Sakuya break free of Yugi's mind control, so she tells Tenchi that he has to go back to the real world and save everyone. Then, Sakuya says she will never be alone anymore since Tenchi gave her memories to hold on, so she willingly fades away into nothingness and sets him free so that he can restore everything to the way it once was.

Ryoko has hypothesized at the end of the series that, since Sakuya is Yugi's shadow, the now sleeping Yugi might grow up to be Sakuya when she wakes up. However, some fans have hypothesized that she would not grow into Sakuya, but could use her powers to bring Sakuya back instead. If either of these does happen, it will certainly make the competition for Tenchi's heart that much more heated.

==== Mayuka ====
Mayuka
- Tenchi Muyo! character
- Voiced by: Junko Iwao (Japanese); Julie Maddalena (English)

Mayuka (麻由華, Mayuka) is a fictional character in the Tenchi Muyo! series, appearing in the 1997 movie "Tenchi Muyo! Manatsu no Eve", released by Pioneer in the U.S. as "Tenchi the Movie 2: The Daughter of Darkness.

Mayuka was created by the Juraian demoness, Yuzuha, using her and Tenchi's DNA, and was sent to the present time, posing as Tenchi's future daughter. Upon Mayuka's arrival, Ayeka and Ryoko took an immediate dislike towards her, but Sasami begins to like her, and even promised her that they would celebrate Christmas together. Mayuka began to develop her emotions at this point, much to Yuzuha's disgust. Yuzuha began to manipulate her to resume her old mission of kidnapping Tenchi. Curiously, she has the ability to project either an actual Lighthawk Wing or a similarly powerful plane of energy as a weapon, as shown when Ryoko tried to interrogate her.

Once Mayuka's true nature was revealed, Yuzuha ordered Mayuka to kidnap Sasami, forcing Tenchi and Ryoko to go after her (Yuzuha) instead. She battled Tenchi and Ryoko, cutting Tenchi up with her claws whilst Yuzuha watched, but in the end, Sasami got through to her. Mayuka managed to break free of Yuzuha's control and attacked her, clawing out her right eye and saying that she did not want to fight. She was killed by Yuzuha in retaliation for her disobedience, but after he defeated Yuzuha, Tenchi brought Mayuka's crystal to Washu, and they all agreed to revive her as an infant, thus allowing her to celebrate Christmas with the gang (with Ryoko, with whom Mayuka had previously clashed, vowing to train Mayuka up right).

==== Hiwa Takahashi ====
Hiwa Takahashi
- Tenchi Muyo! character

Hiwa Takahashi (高梁 日羽, Takahashi Hiwa) is a fictional character in the Tenchi Muyo! franchise, a close acquaintance of the title character who makes an appearance in Hitoshi Okuda's No Need for Tenchi! manga.

Unexpected visitor Hiwa and Tenchi are old friends, almost inseparable from the time they were six years old. They spent most evenings having fun and playing games together (even "Doctor"), going so far as adopting a little injured bird they named Ukan. Unfortunately, Hiwa's father moved to Osaka, and being so young with no income of her own Hiwa was obliged to follow. However, she never stopped caring about Tenchi, and years later shows up on the Masaki's doorstep looking to continue their relationship and even marry him, as she had promised when she was a little girl.

Unfortunately, things aren't so clear-cut as they seem: Hiwa is not quite herself, not in the flesh anyway. After some cajoling from Washu, she explains that two days earlier she had been hit by a speeding car, left bruised and broken on the side of the road. The first thing Hiwa sees afterwards is herself laying on a hospital bed, with the doctor telling her parents the girl only had days to live. Somehow Ukan, the bird she and Tenchi had taken care of and Hiwa still looked after, was able to lend its body as an avatar to Hiwa's spirit and brought her to Tenchi. She arrived to be pleased yet also extremely saddened to see Tenchi surrounded by people who loved him. Unfortunately, Hiwa is too far gone for Washu to heal her, causing the scientist to scoff how the "greatest genius in the universe" cannot even save a single girl.

The test

Knowing she won't have much time left, Hiwa wanted to test Ayeka and Ryoko to see if their love for Tenchi was true by subjecting them to illusions generated by one of Washu's inventions. The final test for Ayeka was being told Tenchi wasn't really family and being threatened to lose her title of princess unless she returned to Jurai; meanwhile Ryoko broke up her dream date with Tenchi and decided to help a pregnant woman she had met make it to the hospital by using her powers, expressly against Tenchi's wishes. Both made the right choice, and now knowing their love for Tenchi was sincere Hiwa departs an angel, thankful to know there were those who would love and care for him as she did once she was gone.

Unable to accept that Hiwa is gone, Tenchi has an idea of someone who could save their friend where Washu could not. Sasami is able to use her power as Tsunami to bring back Hiwa, restarting her heart moments after death. Doctors and nurses are shocked by her recovery as Hiwa is embraced by her parents while white feathers still fall from the sky.

==== Kazuma Kagato ====
Kazuma Kagato
- Tenchi Muyo! character

Kazuma Kagato (加賀戸 カズマ, Kagato Kazuma) is a fictional character in Tenchi Muyo!, specifically Hitoshi Okuda's No Need for Tenchi! manga series, published in the United States by Viz Media.

Master chef Though he is the spitting image of the space pirate Kagato, Kazuma has little to do with the criminal outside of looks. He is the two-time reigning champion of the highly regarded "Viva with Cooking!" game show, and intends to extend that streak even with Sasami as his primary competition. His father, Mr. Kagato, is set on Kazuma taking over the family business, a famous restaurant in Ginza the Kagatos have run for four generations. But his son only cooks to gain his dad's attention and has no interest in becoming a professional chef, and unknown to his father has a "Retire from Cooking Announcement Plan", set to be implemented once Kazuma wins three times in a row.

Tome, the second cook of the restaurant, goes to Sasami with a request; throw the match, as Kazuma might be used as a puppet by his dad for the rest of his life otherwise. After talking to Washu, she decides against it, as not only would it be bad to lose on purpose, but it'd be rude to Kazuma as well.

The three-part competition begins, and while she has a brief moment of doubt Sasami decides to do her best, no matter the outcome. The two exchange wins in the opening rounds, with Sasami edging out Kazuma in dishwashing and the boy scoring a buzzer-beating victory in a cooking quiz. Seeing his son's chances at a third championship in jeopardy, Mr. Kagato decides the fix should be in, sabotaging Sasami's ingredients by injecting a carrot with "the dreaded MSG". "It's better to cheat than lose", after all.

Final rounds and decisions

The championship is a two-hour stir-fried vegetable cook-off, the outcome deciding the ultimate winner. Kazuma has a slim lead going into the final round, Sasami and a boy named Asari the only remaining challengers. Though tipped off to the outside interference by Ryo-Ohki, Sasami refuses to believe Kazuma would ever cheat. While she's preoccupied, Asari - ashamed to be losing to an eight-year-old girl - does some damage of his own, intentionally knocking Sasami over and causing her to chip her cutting knife. Kazuma sees the trick and confronts Asari, demanding the boy apologize to Sasami for his cheating, much to Mr. Kagato's chagrin.

A helping hand (literally) from Ryoko allows the match to continue, and at the end of the day Kazuma loses a close contest to Sasami, losing his title. Kazuma's father is ashamed, and becomes especially irate over his son's wishes not to succeed him as chief chef at their restaurant. Calling Kazuma a "failure", his father insists on deciding his future for him, just as that life path was thrust on him twenty years ago. The trade talk is interrupted by Washu, who with a well-placed picture and the discarded syringe reveals the elder Kagato's ploy to Toma and Kazuma.

Kazuma and Sasami leave on good terms, looking forward to cooking together again. As they drive back to the restaurant, the boy tells his father (somewhat cowed by the whole experience) how impressive he thought Sasami was, particularly in the face of all the rigorous training they've gone through. Choosing his own destiny for the first time, Kazuma wants to study even harder to give Sasami the best match he can when next they meet. Proud of his son and finally realizing children aren't puppets on their parents' strings, the two leave to practice cooking together.
