= List of Tenchi Muyo! episodes =

This is an episode list for the Tenchi Muyo! series, which started on 25 September 1992 in Japan. The series was created by Masaki Kajishima, produced by AIC and distributed by Pioneer LDC/Geneon, VAP, and Funimation Entertainment.

== Tenchi Muyo! Ryo-Ohki ==
=== Season 1 ===
No.	Title	Original release date	US
1	"Ryoko Resurrected"; Transliteration: "Ryōko Fukkatsu" (Japanese: 魎呼復活)	25 September 1992	8 December 1993
2	"Here Comes Ayeka!"; Transliteration: "Aeka ga Deta!" (Japanese: 阿重霞が出た!)	25 October 1992	29 December 1993
3	"Hello, Ryo-Ohki!"; Transliteration: "Konnichiwa! Ryōōki-Chan" (Japanese: こんにちは!魎皇鬼ちゃん)	25 November 1992	16 February 1994
4	"Mihoshi Falls to the Land of Stars"; Transliteration: "Hoshi Furusato ni Mihoshi Furu" (Japanese: 星降る里に美星降る)	10 December 1992	23 March 1994
5	"Kagato Attacks!"; Transliteration: "Kagato Shūrai!" (Japanese: 神我人襲来!)	25 February 1993	27 April 1994
6	"We Need Tenchi!"; Transliteration: "Tenchi Hitsuyō" (Japanese: 天地必要)	25 March 1993	1 June 1994

=== Season 1 Special ===
No.	Title	Original release date	US
7	"The Night Before the Carnival"; Transliteration: "O-Matsuri Zenjitsu no Yoru!" (Japanese: お祭り前日の夜!)	25 September 1993	29 June 1994

=== Season 2 ===
No.	Title	Original release date	US airdate
8	"Hello Baby!"; Transliteration: "Konnichiwa Akachan" (Japanese: こんにちは赤ちゃん)	25 September 1994	27 April 1995
9	"Sasami and Tsunami"; Transliteration: "Sasami to Tsunami" (Japanese: 砂沙美と津名魅)	25 October 1994	27 April 1995
10	"I Love Tenchi!"; Transliteration: "Tenchi ga Suki" (Japanese: 天地が好き)	25 February 1995	27 June 1995
11	"The Advent of the Goddess"; Transliteration: "Megami Kōrin" (Japanese: 女神降臨)	25 March 1995	27 June 1995
12	"Zero Ryoko"; Transliteration: "Zero Ryōko" (Japanese: 零・魎呼)	25 June 1995	19 December 1995
13	"Here Comes Jurai!"; Transliteration: "Ō Kitarinaba Sachi Tōkaraji" (Japanese: 皇来たりなば幸遠からじ)	25 September 1995	19 December 1995
13a	"Here Comes Jurai! 2"	25 September 1995	19 December 1995

=== Season 3 ===
Note: The English title used in FUNimation Entertainment's Region 1 release of the series appears first, followed by the original kana/kanji and romaji. Where applicable, a more literal translation of the original title appears after the romaji.

No.	Title	Original release date	US airdate
14	"Visitor From Afar"; Transliteration: "Enpō Yori Kitarumono" (Japanese: 遠方より来たるモノ)	18 September 2003	TBA
15	"Fiancée"; Transliteration: "Īnazuke" (Japanese: 許嫁)	21 December 2003	TBA
16	"Strategy"; Transliteration: "Tadaima, Kyūyōchū ni Tsuki ~Strategy~ (Currently Resting ~Strategy~)" (Japanese: 唯今、休養中につき～Strategy～)	27 March 2004	TBA
17	"Here Comes Misao on the Chobimaru!"; Transliteration: "Misao ga Chobimaru de Yattekita! (Misao Arrives Aboard the Chobimaru!)" (Japanese: 美咲生がチョビ丸でやってきた!)	15 September 2004	TBA
18	"Operation: Lovey-Dovey"; Transliteration: "Rabu-Rabu Daisakusen ~Shūen no Hajimari (Lovey-Dovey Epic Battle ~The Beginning of the End~)" (Japanese: ラブラブ大作戦～終焉の始まり～)	22 December 2004	TBA
19	"Z"; Transliteration: "Zetto" (Japanese: Z)	16 March 2005	1 April 2012

=== Season 3 Special ===
No.	Title	Original release date	US airdate
20	"Final Confrontations"; Transliteration: "Dai-San-Ki Purasu Wan (Third Series Plus 1)" (Japanese: 第三期プラス1)	9 September 2005	TBA

=== Season 4 ===
No.	Title	Original release date
21	"Yesterday's Party"; Transliteration: "Zenjitsu Utage" (Japanese: 前日宴)	30 November 2016
22	"Fate of the Masaki"; Transliteration: "Masaki no Shukumei" (Japanese: 柾木の宿命)	22 February 2017
23	"Vows and Desires"; Transliteration: "Chikai to Yokubō" (Japanese: 誓いと欲望)	31 May 2017
24	"A Good Day to Set Out"; Transliteration: "Īhi Tabitachi" (Japanese: いい日旅立ち)	13 September 2017

=== Season 5 ===
No.	Title	Original release date
1	"Step Mother, Step Sister, Inheritance, And..."; Transliteration: "Gibo to Gishi to Isan to..." (Japanese: 義母と義姉と遺産と...)	28 February 2020
2	"Project Eden"; Transliteration: "Rakuen Keikaku" (Japanese: 楽園計画)	29 May 2020
3	"Welcome to Tabletop Island"; Transliteration: "Banjō Shima e Yōkoso" (Japanese: 盤上島へようこそ)	28 August 2020
4	"Paradise Paradigm"; Transliteration: "Paradaisu・Paradaimu" (Japanese: パラダイス・パラダイム)	27 November 2020
5	"I am sure you have your opinion on the matter, but please consider the matter closed" Transliteration: "Iroiro go Iken Mō Arideshō ga, Naruyō ni Natta to Iu Koto de" (Japanese: いろいろご意見もおありでしょうが、なるようになったということで)	26 February 2021
6	"The Max Level (?) Hero Departs"; Transliteration: "Kansuto (?) Yūsha no Tabidachi" (Japanese: カンスト(?)勇者の旅立ち)	28 May 2021

== Tenchi Universe ==
=== Earth Adventure ["Chikyū-hen" (地球篇)] (Episodes 1-10) ===
No.	Title	Original release date	US airdate
1	"No Need for Discussions!"; Transliteration: "Mondō Muyō!" (Japanese: 問答無用!)	2 April 1995	26 November 1996
2	"No Need for a Princess!"; Transliteration: "Ōjo Muyō!" (Japanese: 皇女無用!)	9 April 1995	26 November 1996
3	"No Need for Worries!"; Transliteration: "Shinpai Muyō!" (Japanese: 心配無用!)	16 April 1995	26 November 1996
4	"No Need for Monsters!"; Transliteration: "Yōkai Muyō!" (Japanese: 妖怪無用!)	23 April 1995	26 November 1996
5	"No Need for Partners!"; Transliteration: "Aibō Muyō!" (Japanese: 相棒無用!)	30 April 1995	25 February 1997
6	"No Need for Resident Officers!"; Transliteration: "Chūzai Muyō!" (Japanese: 駐在無用!)	7 May 1995	25 February 1997
7	"No Need for a Carnival!"; Transliteration: "Ennichi Muyō!" (Japanese: 縁日無用!)	14 May 1995	25 February 1997
8	"No Need for a Genius!"; Transliteration: "Tensai Muyō!" (Japanese: 天才無用!)	21 May 1995	29 April 1997
9	"No Need for Memories!"; Transliteration: "Tsuioku Muyō!" (Japanese: 追憶無用!)	28 May 1995	29 April 1997
10	"No Need for an Arch Rival!"; Transliteration: "Shukuteki Muyō!" (Japanese: 宿敵無用!)	4 June 1995	29 April 1997

=== Time and Space Adventures ["Tokubetsu Kōgyō" (特別興行)] (Episodes 11-13) ===
These episodes are an adaptation of the drama CD, Tenchi Muyo! Special: Creation of the Universe Journey across Space-Time, with the exception of Ayeka's tale, which was created for episode 11. The latter tale was supposed to be on the aforementioned CD, but was cut out due to time constraints.

No.	Title	Original release date	US airdate
11	"Time and Space Adventures: Part I"; Transliteration: "Tenchikaibyaku Jikū Michiyuki - Zenpen" (Japanese: 天地開闢 時空道行 前編)	11 June 1995	3 June 1997
12	"Time and Space Adventures: Part II"; Transliteration: "Tenchikaibyaku Jikū Michiyuki - Chūhen" (Japanese: 天地開闢 時空道行 中編)	18 June 1995	3 June 1997
13	"Time and Space Adventures: Part III"; Transliteration: "Tenchikaibyaku Jikū Michiyuki - Kōhen" (Japanese: 天地開闢 時空道行 後編)	25 June 1995	3 June 1997

=== Space Adventure ["Uchū-hen" (宇宙篇)] (Episodes 14-26) ===
No.	Title	Original release date	US airdate
14	"No Need for a Rebellion!"; Transliteration: "Hanran Muyō!" (Japanese: 反乱無用!)	2 July 1995	24 June 1997
15	"No Need for an Escape!"; Transliteration: "Tōbō Muyō!" (Japanese: 逃亡無用!)	9 July 1995	24 June 1997
16	"No Need for Hiding!"; Transliteration: "Senpuku Muyō!" (Japanese: 潜伏無用!)	16 July 1995	24 June 1997
17	"No Need for Hunger!"; Transliteration: "Kūfuku Muyō!" (Japanese: 空腹無用!)	23 July 1995	26 August 1997
18	"No Need for a Ghost!"; Transliteration: "Yūrei Muyō!" (Japanese: 幽霊無用!)	30 July 1995	26 August 1997
19	"No Need for Runaways!"; Transliteration: "Bakusō Muyō!" (Japanese: 爆走無用!)	6 August 1995	26 August 1997
20	"No Need for Swimsuits!"; Transliteration: "Mizugi Muyō!" (Japanese: 水着無用!)	13 August 1995	26 August 1997
21	"No Need for a Checkpoint!"; Transliteration: "Sekisho Muyō!" (Japanese: 関所無用!)	20 August 1995	26 August 1997
22	"No Need for Knights!"; Transliteration: "Kishi Muyō!" (Japanese: 騎士無用!)	27 August 1995	26 August 1997
23	"No Need for Karma!"; Transliteration: "Innen Muyō!" (Japanese: 因縁無用!)	3 September 1995	16 December 1997
24	"No Need for Ryoko!"; Transliteration: "Ryōko Muyō!" (Japanese: 魎呼無用!)	10 September 1995	16 December 1997
25	"No Need for a Showdown!"; Transliteration: "Kessen Muyō!" (Japanese: 決戦無用!)	17 September 1995	16 December 1997
26	"No Need for a Conclusion!"; Transliteration: "Ketsuron Muyō!" (Japanese: 結論無用!)	24 September 1995	16 December 1997

== Tenchi in Tokyo ==
No.	Title	Original release date	US airdate
1	"Separation Anxiety"; Transliteration: "sakura saku / hana no miyako de / URA URARA [Cherry blossoms fall, flower of the capital, ooh la ooh la la]" (Japanese: 桜咲く 華の都で ウラウララ)	1 April 1997	8 December 1998
2	"Four's a Crowd"; Transliteration: "enmusubi / kimete wa koyubi no / akai ito [Love knot - decision by a red thread on the little finger]" (Japanese: 縁結び 決め手は小指の 赤い糸)	8 April 1997	8 December 1998
3	"Long Distance Lunacy"; Transliteration: "daikonsen / dengon GÊMU wa / RABU GÊMU [Seriously crossed lines - the whisper game is a love game]" (Japanese: 大混線 伝言ゲームは ラブゲーム)	15 April 1997	8 December 1998
4	"The Eternal Pledge"; Transliteration: "akogare no / anata to aruku / BÂJIN RÔDO [The yearning to walk down the wedding aisle with you]" (Japanese: あこがれの 貴方と歩く バージンロード)	22 April 1997	8 December 1998
5	"Money! Money! Money!"; Transliteration: "kane kasege / sâ KANE kasege / kane kasege [Earn money, come on, earn money, earn money]" (Japanese: 金かせげ さあカネかせげ 金かせげ)	29 April 1997	12 January 1999
6	"Play Date"; Transliteration: "saso warete / fushigi no kuni no / meikyû (RABIRINSU) [Invitation, a mysterious place, a labyrinth]" (Japanese: 誘われて ふしぎの国の 迷宮[ラビリンス])	6 May 1997	12 January 1999
7	"The Day We Met"; Transliteration: "koi koi to / yobaretaru ka na / uchûsen [Love-love and the calling of a spaceship]" (Japanese: 恋い恋いと 呼ばれたるかな 宇宙船)	13 May 1997	12 January 1999
8	"Tenchi Anniversary"; Transliteration: "ki ga tsukeba / anata ga zutto / soba ni ita [When I realized it, you've been beside me all the time]" (Japanese: 気がつけば 貴方がずっと そばにいた)	20 May 1997	16 March 1999
9	"The Guardians of Old"; Transliteration: "ka no chikara / akumu hakobishi / chiga iseki" (Japanese: かの地から 悪夢運びし 地下遺跡)	27 May 1997	16 March 1999
10	"Ryoko's Big Date"; Transliteration: "kuchibiru ni / omoi wo takusu / RÛJU ka na [A thought entrusted on your lips - rouge, isn't it?]" (Japanese: くちびるに 想いを託す ルージュかな)	3 June 1997	16 March 1999
11	"Moon Mission"; Transliteration: "shikararete / uchû e iede / MYA MYA MYA MYA MYA [Scolded space runaway, meow meow meow meow meow]" (Japanese: しかられて 宇宙へ家出 ミャミャミャミャミャ)	10 June 1997	11 May 1999
12	"Stupid Cupid"; Transliteration: "NISE OYAJI / RATIN no RIZUMU de / PAPA iyan [Fake father, Latin rhythm, no Dad!]" (Japanese: ニセオヤジ ラテンのリズムで パパいやん)	17 June 1997	11 May 1999
13	"The Eye of the Destroyer"; Transliteration: "gekitotsu no / tsuki to yamiyo to / inazuma to [The moon, the moonless night and a crash of lightning]" (Japanese: 激突の 月と闇夜と 稲妻と)	24 June 1997	11 May 1999
14	"Tokyo or Bust!"; Transliteration: "KAttobase / Okayama -> Tôkyô / musenryokô [Flying off the handle - hitchhiking from Okayama to Tokyo]" (Japanese: カッとばせ 岡山→東京 無銭旅行)	1 July 1997	13 July 1999
15	"Love Match"; Transliteration: "bunkasai / ai no hajimari / heiwa no owari [Culture festival - the beginning of love, the end of peace]" (Japanese: 文化祭 愛の始まり 平和の終わり)	8 July 1997	13 July 1999
16	"Carnival!"; Transliteration: "sakura chiru / hana no miyako no / koi moyô [Cherry blossoms fall, flower of the capital, love pattern]" (Japanese: 桜散る 華の都の 恋模様)	15 July 1997	13 July 1999
17	"Drifting Away"; Transliteration: "samayotte / sora no kanata ni / Ryôko tatsu [Wandering - Ryoko leaves to wander space]" (Japanese: 彷徨いて 宇宙[そら]の彼方に 魎呼たつ)	22 July 1997	14 September 1999
18	"Game Over"; Transliteration: "hanareyuku / kokoro to kokoro / wakare no hi [The day of parting, the separation of hearts and minds]" (Japanese: 離れゆく 心とこころ 別れの日)	29 July 1997	14 September 1999
19	"The Lonely Princess"; Transliteration: "tomo chire te / Aeka kokuhaku / todokamu omoi [The parting of friends, Ayeka's confession, an unfulfilled wish]" (Japanese: 友去りて 阿重霞告白 届かぬ想い)	5 August 1997	14 September 1999
20	"Old Friends"; Transliteration: "shoku shirazu / MIHO KIYO, DOTABATA / sennyû sôsa [Knowing early summer, Mihoshi and Kiyone sneak noisily in to investigate]" (Japanese: 初夏知らず ミホキヨ、ドタバタ 潜入捜査)	12 August 1997	26 October 1999
21	"Real Friends?"; Transliteration: "semi shigure / kanashiki yûgi / yume no ato [An outburst of cicada chirps, sad after a dream of playing]" (Japanese: 蝉時雨 悲しき遊戯 夢の後)	19 August 1997	26 October 1999
22	"Sakuya's Secret"; Transliteration: "hanare kite / kokoroshiki / omoi hito [Coming to leave, the thoughts of a lonely person]" (Japanese: 離れ来て 心寂しき 想い人)	26 August 1997	26 October 1999
23	"Here, There, and Everywhere"; Transliteration: "natsu honbon / acchi kocchi de / kyû tenkai [Summer performance, here and there, a quick development]" (Japanese: 夏本番 あっちこっちで 急展開)	2 September 1997	23 November 1999
24	"Yugi's Shadow"; Transliteration: "kagerô no / gotoki aruwa no / yumegatari [The account of a dream is like a hazy reality]" (Japanese: 陽炎の 如き現[うつつ]の 夢語り)	9 September 1997	23 November 1999
25	"The End of Time"; Transliteration: "hana chiramu / kimi sarishi ato / ...... [Scattering flowers, you're leaving me behind......]" (Japanese: 花散らむ 君去りし後 ・・・・・)	16 September 1997	23 November 1999
26	"Payback"; Transliteration: "daidanen / datte watashi wa / otona da mon [The grand finale, but I am becoming an adult]" (Japanese: 大団円! だって私は 大人だもん∇)	23 September 1997	23 November 1999

== Movies ==
1. Tenchi the Movie: Tenchi Muyo in Love
2. Tenchi the Movie 2: The Daughter of Darkness
3. Tenchi Muyo!: Galaxy Police Mihoshi Space Adventure
4. Tenchi Forever! The Movie
