= List of Tenchi Muyo! War on Geminar episodes =

Isekai no Seikishi Monogatari is an OVA anime series created by Masaki Kajishima, the creator of the Tenchi Muyo! series. The story follows a young boy named Kenshi Masaki, the half-sibling of Tenchi Masaki, who is transported to the world of Geminar for unknown reasons. In Geminar, there are humanoid mecha called Sacred Mechanoids, which are used to fight wars, and Sacred Mechamasters, the people who pilot them.

Isekai no Seikishi Monogatari is produced by AIC and BeSTACK under the directorship of Koji Yoshikawa, with series composition by Hideki Shirane, characters by Hajime Watanabe, music by Akifumi Tada, and produced by Shoji Ohta, Yasuo Ueda, and Yoshiyuki Matsuzaki, respectively. Thirteen episodes aired in Japan between March 20, 2009, and March 19, 2010, on their Pay-Per-View television channel Animax. The episodes were later released on DVD and Blu-ray by VAP from May 22, 2009, to May 26, 2010. A Blu-ray box set was later released on May 18, 2011. In 2012, the anime was licensed by Funimation Entertainment in North America under the title Tenchi Muyo! War on Geminar.

The opening theme for the series is "Follow Me" by Japanese-Canadian pop singer Seira Kagami featuring Sound Around, while the ending theme is "Destino" by Alchemy+. The opening theme was later released as a maxi single by VAP on January 14, 2010.

== Episodes ==
No.	Title	Original release date	English release date
1	"The Black and White Sacred Mechanoids"; Transliteration: "Shiro to Kuro no Seikijin" (Japanese: 白と黒の聖機人)	March 20, 2009	March 5, 2013
Kenshi Masaki, a 15-year-old boy who controls the white Sacred Mechanoid, is ordered by a masked man to kill Lashara Earth, the ruler of the Shtrayu Empire, in order to return to his world. Chiaia Flan, Lashara's bodyguard, pilots her Sacred Mechanoid and faces off against Kenshi, but loses overwhelmingly to his power even with the assistance of Wahanly Shume. After deciding not to kill the Princess, Kenshi is taken captive and held prisoner. While being held, all the girls are surprised at how Kenshi, a male Sacred Mechamaster, has been able to do what he can until Doll rescues him and takes him back. The leader decides to eliminate him, but Kenshi easily takes his henchmen out with his martial arts and escapes. When he returns to Lashara with Aura Shurifon's aid, he catches a feverish disease called Rodeshiatore, which Ulyte states that he will die in the next six hours if they do not treat it. Aura and Mexiah set off to find some Triam herbs when Aura is attacked by Doll, who easily overpowers her until Aura uses the Dark Elf Field to knock her out. After curing Kenshi of his illness, the Swan makes its way to the Holy Land.
2	"To the Holy Land"; Transliteration: "Seichi e" (Japanese: 聖地へ)	April 17, 2009	March 5, 2013
After seeing Kenshi's capabilities in battle, Lashara decides to make him her servant while concealing the truth about him being a Sacred Mechamaster from the others. Kenshi witnesses the Holy Land and the academy that Lashara and Chiaia attend. Kenshi becomes more aware of his duties as a servant while making new friends, and meeting Chiaia's older sister Mexiah. Kenshi has a brief witness between Chiaia and a man named Dagmyer Mesut, a childhood friend of Chiaia's. Kenshi meets Aura in the forest and later aids Ulyte before he gets sick. Kenshi later meets Maria Nanadan, Lashara's cousin and princess of Havoniwa, and her assistant Yukine. At the end, both Wahan and Chiaia are appointed Sacred Mechamasters.
3	"He Who Must Work......"; Transliteration: "Hatarakazaru mono......" (Japanese: 働かざる者・・・・・・)	May 22, 2009	March 12, 2013
Lashara decides that Kenshi should work to "earn" his meals, and is later introduced to the Headmistress of Holy Land Academy where he is later assigned various jobs on his first day. Not only he is demonstrating all expertise in all areas of work, he becomes famous among the staff members and those who study at the academy. During the process of Kenshi's pay going towards Lashara, she realizes how much money Kenshi has made and decides to make him continue working. Kenshi is later introduced to Lithia Po Cheena, the daughter of the Pope and President of the Student Council, and her assistant Lapis. Later, he is hypnotized by Mexiah to become a "massaging machine", which he gives to Chiaia, Aura, Lithia, Yukine, Wahanly and some other girls. After the massages, all the girls have suffered some orgasmic effects to the point the Headmistress stops Kenshi from giving any more massages (although he has been booked to give massages to those who want it just before their marriages). Later on, Mexiah clings to Kenshi and asks him to run away with her, at which Wahanly, Chiaia, Lithia, Yukine and Maria attack both of them for giving them such erotic massages. They begin destroying areas of the Academy until they are reprimanded by the Headmistress, who later bans them (sans Kenshi) from going into the Academy until all damages are fixed.
4	"Pendant"; Transliteration: "Pendanto" (Japanese: ペンダント)	June 19, 2009	March 12, 2013
Kenshi continues his duties to serve Lashara while working and attending the Academy. With Kenshi acting as foreman and guide, the girls (with the exception of Lashara and Maria) repair all of the damage caused in the last episode. Maria attempts to get Yukine and Kenshi together after seeing how much affection she has for him, while Kenshi is being chased by girls who have fallen for him. Later, while Kenshi talks about his past with Lashara and Chiaia, Chiaia accidentally breaks the string of his crystle pendant necklace (which had been a gift to him from Ryo-Ohki) and replaces it with a handwoven red string, which, much to her chagrin, symbolizes love.
5	"To Be Chased and Pursued"; Transliteration: "Oware Oware te" (Japanese: 追われ追われて)	July 24, 2009	TBA
All the girls are still chasing Kenshi, especially now that he has become a member of the Student Council. Mexiah decides to take Kenshi for herself but Kenshi makes a quick getaway. The female upperclassmen and underclassmen form an alliance in hopes of capturing Kenshi through large numbers and teamwork. Later in the forest, a competition between Kenshi and the girls involving gathering food from the forest and cooking a hot pot dish is held with Kenshi's freedom at stake. The competition comes down to Kenshi versus Aura (none of the other girls being capable of finding any food) and ends with Kenshi's victory (although the secret ingredients of his success shock everybody but Aura).
6	"Vacation"; Transliteration: "Bakansu" (Japanese: バカンス)	August 21, 2009	TBA
Flora Nanadan, the Queen of Havoniwa, has invited Maria and Lashara to come to visit her, especially to meet Kenshi while bringing along other guests. While making their way to the resort, Kenshi meets his classmate Ceres Taito–another male Seikishi who wants to run away with his girlfriend Hazuki–and decides to aid them so they can live happily together. Flora becomes quite attracted to Kenshi while having pillow fights with the rest of the girls. However, a group of bandits, led by Cordyline and her daughter Lan, target Ceres and Dagmyer as they are worth a lot due to breeding. When both Ceres and Dagmyer are taken, Kenshi goes to save them. After the failed attack, Dagmyer makes a deal with the bandits while giving a bonus to Cordyline.
7	"Competitive Sports Tournament"; Transliteration: "Kyōbu Taikai" (Japanese: 競武大会)	September 18, 2009	TBA
Dagmyer has given passage to the bandits, while Lan, a member of the bandits, is infiltrating Holy land Academy. Dagmyer persuades the Student Council to hold a warrior tournament, and all the female students and staff placed bets on Kenshi to win the race. As the race commences, it ends up being Aura and Kenshi as everyone cheers on, and later ends with Kenshi being the victor after Aura gives up. Because of a threat from Chiaia, Kenshi is unable to stop and begins running crazily around the Holy Land. Kenshi finally stops (thanks to another Chiaia threat) and collapses and Aura is beside him. Realizing that she is in love with Kenshi, she kisses him while he is still resting. Unbeknown to everyone, Ulyte and Dagmyer begin their assault with the enemy forces as well as the male Sacred Mechamasters aligning themselves with Dagmyer.
8	"Invasion"; Transliteration: "Shūrai" (Japanese: 襲来)	October 23, 2009	TBA
Dagmyer begins his attack on the Holy Land with most of the male Sacred Mechamasters of the Academy and has nearly taken over most of the Holy Land. The female students and staff are ordered to evacuate the Holy Land, which has now been captured by Dagmyer's father Babalun. All hope is lost until Kenshi reveals his true capabilities as he pilots the white Sacred Mechanoid once again to all the females' astonishment of Kenshi being a Sacred Mechamaster. While Kenshi has almost destroyed all the opposing Sacred Mechanoids with ease, it is revealed that Chiaia's big sister Mexiah is in fact Doll, who pilots the black Sacred Mechanoid and is being controlled by Babulun. As Kenshi and Doll fight to a draw, it is not long until Babalun reveals his true intentions, and with that Kenshi is ordered to retreat while thinking of Doll/Mexiah.
9	"Expectations"; Transliteration: "Omowaku" (Japanese: 思惑)	November 20, 2009	TBA
Babalun succeeds in taking over the Holy Land and now has the Shield of Gaia in his possession. The Church begins debating on what actions must be taken to defeat him and take back the Holy Land. Meanwhile, Lashara is uneasy; after what happened with Kenshi revealing to be a Sacred Mechamaster and showing his capabilities, she is unsure as to whether he will continue to be her servant now that the other nations know about him. Chiaia, still reeling from Dagmyer's betrayal, has talked with Dagmyer about why he has aided his father, at which point she is persuaded to kill Kenshi. While Kenshi is asleep, Chiaia sets off to kill him, but could not do so after realizing that he is too innocent. Chiaia later tells Dagmeyer that she will not follow him, at which point Dagmyer reveals his true intentions and the Swan attacks at full force to get Chiaia back. Kenshi, already on the scene, defeats Dagmyer's guards and rescues Chiaia. Doll later appears before Kenshi with the Shield of Gaia, and its destructive force forces Kenshi and the Swan to make a hasty retreat to Shurifon, Aura's home. Late at night, Kenshi and Chiaia have a brief chat. During the chat, Chiaia recognizes the red cord on Kenshi's necklace and realizes she has feelings for him. After arriving in Shurifon, Kenshi is later challenged by King Shurifon, Aura's father, to see if he has what it takes to be a true warrior. Kenshi easily wins and the King decides to have Kenshi and Aura engaged. However, Doll and other enemy Seikijin show up.
10	"Home"; Transliteration: "Ie" (Japanese: 家)	December 18, 2009	TBA
Doll and Dagmyer launch their attack on Shurifon's castle. No one is harmed due to the competition between Kenshi and the King, and the King faces off against Dagmyer. However he is overwhelmed by Doll and the Shield of Gaia until Kenshi comes to his rescue. Meanwhile, after the Swan makes its escape, the Church is attacked by Doll. While Kenshi and Chiaia are scouting the area, an escape pod from a Church messenger ship is rescued by Kenshi. Rea Second, a member of the Church, is taken into the Swan. The Swan makes its way to Havoniwa, where it lies in ruins after an ambush by Cordyline's bandits, who have taken over a defense weapon called the Meteor Fall. Just as the Swan is about to be destroyed, Yukine and her Sacred Mechanoid saves it at the last minute, giving Kenshi the chance to take out the bandits and the weapon in one go. They reach the underground section of Havoniwa where Flora and Maria are currently residing, and after some debate, they come to the question of who owns Kenshi or whom Kenshi wants to go with. Kenshi is unsure to whom he should go with, even after seeking advice from the other girls. He finally goes to Lashara, who pleads for him to stay by her side. After telling her that he will protect her, Kenshi comes to the conclusion that he will make the Swan an independent state where all people can take refuge. After becoming leader of the Swan, Kenshi is shocked to find out he is banned from excavating jewels on the ship's hull.
11	"Barrier Workshop"; Transliteration: "Kekkai Kōbo" (Japanese: 結界工房)	January 22, 2010	TBA
As the group travel on the Swan, it is not long until trouble occurs when they see Ceres being attacked by bandit Sacred Mechamasters. Kenshi goes to aid Ceres, only to be trapped with Ceres from a Sacred Mechamaster reactor, which is overloading and about to explode. However, something changes inside Kenshi where he cannot forgive those who hurt Ceres and half of the white Sacred Mechanoid becomes black, where he then compresses the reactor and launches it elsewhere. Kenshi attacks the hideout while Ceres, Chiaia, and Aura rescue Hazuki. Kenshi goes berserk and takes out all the Sacred Mechanoids while hurting himself in the process and giving Dagmyer a traumatic experience. Ceres and Hazuki later join the Swan, and Kenshi and the group make their way to the Barrier Workshop to see Naua Flan, Chiaia's father. Naua briefs them on the history of Sacred Mechanoid, Sacred Mechamaster and the Sacred Mechalord. Naua also refers to Mexiah and the forgotten warrior (referring to Kenshi), but is unable to tell them about Kenshi. As Doll and the bandits come, Rea turns traitor and steals a mysterious object. The Swan and her crew manage to escape and Doll/Mexiah finds out from her father the truth about Kenshi.
12	"Fruition"; Transliteration: "Ketsujitsu" (Japanese: 結実)	February 19, 2010	TBA
Kenshi and the group realise that they need to find another source of power to match Gaia's strength. They go to Yukine's village, where they turn a monolith of sacred rock into a crude stone sword by condensing it with Kenshi's power. After the sword is made, Kenshi takes out the whole enemy faction in one swing. Kenshi is reunited with the Lithia, Lapis and other members of Holy Land Academy right after he collapses from the fatigue and gets a fever. While Kenshi is asleep, the girls all talk about how Kenshi has helped them even though he is not actually involved in their worlds' battle. King Shurifon and Flora make their entrance, telling them that both Aura and Maria are to be engaged to Kenshi. While Kenshi is asleep, Mexiah visits him on his bedside and tells him the truth about what he is and that both of them should be together. However, it is revealed to be a trick as Babalun tries to take control over Kenshi like he does Mexiah/Doll, believing that Kenshi too has a core crystal like Mexiah/Doll does, but Kenshi, in-fact having no core crystal to rewrite, is able to throw-off his mind-control. Mexiah then attempts to take out the Swan by destroying the weight inhibitor on the Tenchi sword, but Kenshi saves it just in time. Meanwhile, Babalun vows to defeat Kenshi while Kenshi gains reinforcements to stop Gaia's revival.
13	"Gaia" (Japanese: ガイア)	March 19, 2010	TBA
All forces from various nations have banded to take down Babalun before he revives the Sacred Mechalord Gaia. The Swan and Kenshi make haste to stop Gaia's revival, but are stopped in their tracks by Dagmyer as he comes to duel Kenshi. With much ease, Dagmyer is defeated, at this point realizing how strong Kenshi really is. However, Gaia has been revived with Doll inside of it. Kenshi faces off against Doll and to everyone's astonishment, Kenshi is fighting on par with Doll. The tables are later turned when Babalun merges with Gaia and begins to overpower him. Kenshi decides to go all out while Gaia continues to regenerate. He later hears Doll/Mexiah asking him to save her from Babalun/Gaia. In the midst of the battle, Kenshi goes berserk and generates a Light Hawk sword, causing him to destroy the main core of Gaia and save Doll/Mexiah, who both have fallen in love with Kenshi. Babalun later emerges from the scraps, vowing to kill Kenshi, but Ulyte intervenes and kills Babalun, at which point he collapses and reveals his true identity as Rea Second. As all of the girls scream for Kenshi with their affection, Lashara, Maria, Yukine, Mexiah, Chiaia, Aura and Wahan all fight over who owns Kenshi, at which point Lithia points out that she, Morga and all the other girls in the Academy also want ownership and marriage rights to Kenshi. As they come to a decision that whoever catches him gets him first, Kenshi runs for it as Rea watches in amusement.
