= Tenchi Muyō! Game Hen =

1995 video game

- Cover art of Tenchi Muyō! Game Hen
- Developer: Banpresto Co., Ltd.
- Publishers: TamTam Co., Ltd.
- Series: Tenchi Muyo!
- Platform: Super Famicom
- Release: JP: October 27, 1995
- Genres: Role-playing; Strategy
- Mode: Single-player

Tenchi Muyō! Game Hen (天地無用!げーむ編, Tenchi Muyō! Gēmu Hen; Tenchi Muyō!: Game Edition), also known as Tenchi Muyō! RPG, is a Japanese role-playing strategy game developed by Banpresto for the Super Famicom, released on October 27, 1995. It was licensed by AIC and the now former Pioneer LDC. While Tenchi Muyō! Game Hen was never officially translated and released for international consoles, the latter dumped ROM image of the game was hacked and translated into English on two occasions. Lina`chan, Nuku-Nuku & Filia's Translations, or LNF, released their functional iteration in 2000, albeit some bugs and textual imperfections.

== Gameplay ==
Tenchi Muyō! Game Hen is a turn-based game played from an isometric perspective. The game focuses entirely on fighting monsters within progressive worlds, all of which contain linear paths with predetermined battles. As such, the player does not freely roam or interact with the world.

There are a total of 12 playable characters in the game: Tenchi, Ryoko, Ayeka, Mihoshi, Sasami, Shitsuki, Ryo-Ohki, Katsuhito, Yukinojyo, Azaka, Kamidake and Washu. The player starts with the beginning four, acquires the subsequent two later, and, by visiting more varied locations, can acquire the remaining six. In prototypical role-playing fashion, each character has different movements, skills, personal advantages, attacking power, health and defense. Unlike the commonly instituted experience points system, however, characters level up by the accumulated number of monsters they defeat in battles. There is a cap of eight levels that each player character can earn. Up to four characters can be brought into combat at once and matches continue until all members of either side are eliminated.

== Synopsis ==
=== Setting and plot ===
Like the other mediums of the series, Tenchi Muyō! Game Hen begins on the Masaki residence, progressively branching from the property to spacecraft and other planets. The characters Shitsuki and Kusumi, new to the franchise, make an only appearance in the game.

On an otherwise ordinary sunny morning, Tenchi, Ryoko, Ayeka, Mihoshi and Ryo-Ohki sit to breakfast as Sasami finishes serving food. Realizing that Washu is not present, Sasami and Ryo-Ohki go to fetch her. Shortly after leaving, the house begins to wavily glow; ghastly monsters appearing in the hall.

Fighting and defeating the intruders, the group is approached by Shitsuki, a mysterious girl who explains the obscure reason for her visit: test and measure the strengths of everyone. All but Ryoko take her objective with any real care until Shitsuki presents Sasami as a hostage, garnering the now dire attention of the group. Acting the sportsman however, Shitsuki agrees to surrender her captive in return for any one of the group injuring her in a fight. Much to her angst, Shitsuki loses; refusing to go through with her end of the deal. She offers the group a future rematch as compensation and, leaving them with her next location, teleports Sasami and herself to her outbound spaceship.

== Release and reception ==
Reception

Review score
Publication	Score
Famitsu	7/10, 6/10, 4/10, 5/10

Tenchi Muyō! Game Hen was released in Japan for the Super Famicom on October 27, 1995.
