= Mogi =

Mogi may refer to:

== People ==
- Hiroto Mogi, Japanese footballer
- Ken Mogi, Japanese brain scientist
- Kiyoo Mogi, Japanese seismologist
- Shigeru Mogi, Japanese voice actor
- Yasuko Mogi, Japanese female mixed martial arts (MMA) fighter
- Yuzaburo Mogi, Japanese business executive

Fictional characters

- Kanzo Mogi: See List of Death Note characters
- Natsuki Mogi (Natalie in the Tokyopop version): See Initial D

== Places ==
=== Brazil ===
- Mogi das Cruzes, a municipality in the state of São Paulo
- Mogi Guaçu, a municipality in the state of São Paulo
- Mogi Mirim, a municipality in the state of São Paulo

=== Japan ===
- Mogi Station, a railway station in Kōriyama, Fukushima
