= Photon: The Idiot Adventures =

Japanese OVA series

フォトン (Foton)
- Created by: Masaki Kajishima
- Original video animation
- Directed by: Koji Masunari
- Produced by: Katsumi Hasegawa
- Written by: Yōsuke Kuroda
- Music by: Haruhiko Nishioka
- Studio: AIC
- Licensed by: NA: Discotek Media
- Released: November 21, 1997 – February 18, 1999
- Episodes: 6
- Manga
- Written by: Hiroshi Kanno
- Original run: 1997 – 1998
- Volumes: 3

Photon: The Idiot Adventures, known in Japan as Photon (フォトン, Foton), is a Japanese original video animation (OVA) series created by Masaki Kajishima. The series follows Photon, a boy who possesses superhuman strength, but is extremely simple-minded. He engages in heroic adventures of different varieties. He marries a rebel space pilot named Keyne, and becomes involved in fighting an evil wannabe galactic emperor and his "bumbling henchmen". Photon's marriage to Keyne is slightly odd, as Keyne is more mature than Photon. Yet Photon only sees Keyne as more like Aun's sister (who used to be Aun and Photon's guardian, whom he cared for greatly).

The ending song, "Pinch!", is performed by Yui Horie. A manga based on the anime was written by Hiroshi Kanno.

== Main characters ==
- Photon Earth (Voiced by: Junko Takeuchi (Japanese); Scott Cargle (English)): The protagonist, he is extremely strong and fights using a quarterstaff made of black crystal. The word baka ('idiot') was scribbled across his forehead by Aun in black ink as he was trying to lead her back home. His strength is tremendous, to a point where he is able to crack a crystal barrier with his bare hands. He is also able to withstand even the strongest blasts of Aho energy, even when it is focused directly on him. It is later revealed that he was the source of the un-Aho, which is the reason why Aun's stasis field has no effect on him. Angry at Aun for writing the word 'idiot' in permanent ink, he inscribes the same word on Keyne's forehead, inadvertently marrying her in the process. Though he is simple-minded, he is very trustworthy and loyal to those he promises to protect.
- Aun Freya (Voiced by: Yui Horie (Japanese); Tara Sands (English)): Photon's spoiled, high-strung, flighty childhood friend, she has the ability to create stasis fields. Humorously, she is not immune to her own stasis fields and can paradoxically trap herself (and everything around her) in a perpetual stasis field. Photon is the only one who is immune to her stasis field and also is the only one who can get her and keep her out of such messes. In order to cancel out her stasis fields, he has to knock her on the head with his staff. Aun has a tendency to fall in love with every handsome man she encounters, which always ends up in disappointment for her when they turn her down. She also behaves in a tsundere-like manner towards Photon, hinting that she may have feelings for him.
- Keyne Aqua (Voiced by: Yumi Kuroda (Japanese); Suzy Prue (English)): She is the rebel space pilot who comes to Sandy Planet. Photon inadvertently marries her when he writes the word baka in katakana on her forehead in black marker. However, she readily accepts the marriage out of fear of being alone and eventually admits her love for Photon. It is eventually revealed that she and Princess Lashara were switched soon after birth by the Emperor, meaning that she is the real princess. Near the end of the series, the spirit of her late mother, whom she bears a strong resemblance to, manifests for one last goodbye.
- Princess Lashara Moon (Voiced by: Yuri Amano (Japanese); Carolee Goodgold (English)): Known as the "Flower of the Galaxy" due to her beauty, she is the daughter of the Galactic Emperor. She is madly smitten with Papacha, but what she does not know is that Papacha is going to use her marriage to increase his harem. After learning the truth she is extremely heart-broken and depressed, even contemplating suicide. However, after merging with Pochi #1 (after her Pochi #1's journey with Photon), she regains her mood and falls in love with Photon.
- Sir Papacharino Nanadan (or Papacha) (Voiced by: Kōichi Yamadera (Japanese); Tristan Goddard (English)): Papacha is the bumbling antagonist and also quite perverted when it comes to women. He has an obsession with Keyne and will stop at nothing to have her, but is always foiled by Photon's intervening. He is also quite egotistical and has grand delusions of conquest.
- Pochi #1 (Voiced by: Tomoko Hikita (Japanese); P.M. Lewis (English)): Pochi #1 acts as a leader figure to the others and is the most prominent of the Pochis, having more appearance and influence on the story, such as her close relationship with Lashara. After failing to help Papacha defeat Photon, she is thrown away by him and rescued by Photon; she joins his party and soon falls in love with him.
- Pochis (Voiced by: Yū Asakawa (Japanese); P.M. Lewis (English)): Pochis are Papacha's cute doll-like henchmen. Excluding Pochi #1 (who acts as a leader figure to the others), there are 28 of them, who refer to each other by their number. Though Papacha believes they are all male, in truth, all the Pochis are really female. They temporarily attach to Papacha by their master Princess Lashara as a gift.
- Bulan (Voiced by: Akiko Hiramatsu (Japanese); Mina Sands (English)): She is the mysterious servant woman to Lashara, donning a strange-looking hat (with feminine lips) and skintight purple attire. Bulan usually moves by hovering on a golden platform and arrives with the princess to Sandy Planet to search out the "Singularity Point". However, she seems to know more about Lashara than she really lets on.

== Episodes ==
1. 1997-11-21 Aun is an IDIOT!/Aun no BAKA! 「アウンのバカ」
2. 1997-12-22 The New Bride Keyne/Niizuma no Keyne 「新妻のキーネ」
3. 1998-01-21 Lashara Leaves Home/Tabidachi no Lashara 「旅立ちのラシャラ」
4. 1998-03-27 Pochi's Feelings/Pochi no Kimochi 「ポチの気持ち」
5. 1998-07-24 Papacha Turns the Key/Kagi wo Akeru Papacha 「鍵を開けるパパチャ」
6. 1999-02-18 Photon on the Green Planet/Midori no Hoshi no Photon 「緑の星のフォトン」

== Connections to Tenchi Muyo! universe ==
It has been confirmed by the creator of Tenchi Muyo! and Photon: The Idiot Adventures that the two series are related, as the world that Photon lives on is, in fact, the distant past of the planet Geminar before something happened to revert it to a pre-space flight world again, the parallel world that Isekai no Seikishi Monogatari/Tenchi Muyo! War on Geminar takes place on.
