= Holly the Ghost =

Japanese anime television series

おばけのホーリー (O-bake no Holly)
- Genre: Comedy
- Anime television series
- Directed by: Minoru Okazaki
- Written by: Osamu Nakamura
- Music by: Edison
- Studio: Studio Junio
- Original network: NHK General TV
- Original run: January 28, 1991 – April 12, 1993
- Episodes: 200

Holly the Ghost (おばけのホーリー, O-bake no Holly), also known in Japan as The Ghost Holly, is a Japanese anime television series directed by Minoru Okazaki. The series first aired in Japan on the NHK network between January 28, 1991, and April 6, 1993, spanning 200 episodes.

== Story ==
Holly the Ghost is about Holly (Chocola) who wants to be a "holly ghost". "Holly ghost" is a group of "monsters" who spread fear. Their leader is a witch called Majoline. Together with his 4 new friends (Candy, Toreppaa, etc.) he learns to be a real "holly ghost".

== Main characters ==
- Holly

Voiced by: Yuriko Kaneko

- Piiton

Voiced by: Junpei Takiguchi

- Majoline

Voiced by: Rihoko Yoshida

- Toreppaa

Voiced by: Ryūsei Nakao

- Kakarasu

Voiced by: Hideyuki Umezu

- Candy

Voiced by: Yuko Kobayashi
