= Akifumi Tada =

Japanese composer (born 1964)

Akifumi Tada 多田 彰文
- Born: January 10, 1964 (age 62); Hyōgo Prefecture, Japan
- Genres: Video game music; anime music; orchestral
- Occupations: Composer; musician
- Instrument: Guitar
- Years active: 1989–present

Akifumi Tada (多田 彰文, Tada Akifumi; born January 10, 1964) is a Japanese anime music composer and video game composer.

== Discography ==
=== Video games ===
Composition

- Bomberman 64 (1997)
- 3-Nen B-Gumi Kinpachi Sensei: Densetsu no Kyoudan ni Tate!

=== Anime ===
Composition

- Captain Tsubasa Road to 2002
- Cyborg 009 The Cyborg Soldier
- Dinozaurs: The Series
- Fight Ippatsu! Jūden-chan!!
- Final Fantasy: Unlimited
- Gurazeni
- Haré+Guu
- Haré+Guu Deluxe
- Isekai no Seikishi Monogatari
- Jungle Wa Itsumo Hale Nochi Guu Final
- The Law of Ueki
- Nightwalker
- Nohara Hiroshi Hirumeshi no Ryūgi
- Pikachu's Island Adventure (Short)
- Pikachu's PikaBoo
- Samurai Gun
- Sasami: Magical Girls Club
- Sasami: Magical Girls Club Season 2
- Seraphim Call
- Skip Beat!
- Tenchi Muyo! GXP
- Tenchi Muyo! Ryo-Ohki OAV 3
- Tokyo Underground
- Tōka Gettan
- Tonari no Seki-kun
- Tsuki wa Higashi ni Hi wa Nishi ni: Operation Sanctuary
- Yami to Bōshi to Hon no Tabibito
- Yoshimune
- Yowayowa Sensei

Title Themes

- Ah! My Goddess
- Ah! My Goddess: Flights of Fancy
- Sakura Wars 2
