= Yuko Kobayashi =

Japanese voice actress

- 小林 優子
- Born: February 6, 1961 (age 65); Tokyo, Japan
- Occupations: Actress; voice actress; narrator
- Years active: 1982–Present
- Agent: 81 Produce
- Height: 156 cm (5ft 2)
- Spouse: Mitsuaki Hoshino

Yuko Kobayashi (小林 優子, Kobayashi Yūko; born February 6, 1961 in Tokyo) is a Japanese actress, voice actress, and narrator, currently affiliated with 81 Produce and married to voice actor Mitsuaki Hoshino.

== Filmography ==
=== Television animation ===
- Attacker You! (1984), You Hazuki
- Ranma ½ (1989), Atsuko, Anna and Ling-Ling
- Alfred J. Kwak (1989), Winnie Wana
- Moomin (1990), The Mymble
- Holly the Ghost (1991), Kyandi (Candy)
- Dragon Ball Z (1991), Maron
- Miracle Girls (1993), Noe
- Mobile Suit Victory Gundam (1993), Junko Jenko, Karel Massarik
- Nintama Rantarō (1993), Torawaka Satake, Shina Yamamoto
- Tenchi Universe (1995), Mecha-Washu
- Pocket Monsters (1997), Shigeru Ōkido (Gary Oak)
- Tenchi in Tokyo (1997), Washu Hakubi
- Meizu Bakunetsu Jikū (1997), Rapier Saris
- Dual! Parallel Trouble Adventure (1999), Akane Yamano
- Gensomaden Saiyuki (2000), Kouryuu (young Genjo Sanzo), Renli
- Tenchi Muyo! GXP (2002), Washu Hakubi
- Black Jack (2005), Kazuo's mother
- One Piece (2007), Nico Robin (temporary replacement for Yuriko Yamaguchi)
- Pururun! Shizuku-chan (2007), Rainy
- Bakuman (2012), Mrs. Shiratori
- Ai Tenchi Muyo! (2014), Washu Hakubi
- One Piece (2015), Kyuin

Unknown date

- Oishinbo, Kuniko

=== Theatrical animation ===
- Kiki's Delivery Service (1989), Young senpai witch
- Comet in Moominland (1992), The Mymble
- Tenchi the Movie: Tenchi Muyo in Love (1996), Washu Hakubi
- Tenchi the Movie 2: The Daughter of Darkness (1997), Washu Hakubi
- Maze Bakunetsu Jikuu: Tenpen Kyoui no Giant (1998), Rapier Saris
- Tenchi Forever! The Movie (1999), Washu Hakubi

=== OVAs ===
- Tenchi Muyo! Ryo-Ohki (1992), Washu Hakubi
- Bastard!! (1993), Kai Harn
- Please Save My Earth (1994), Ayako Okamura
- Armitage III (1995), Rosalind Horhes
- Maze (1996), Rapier Saris
- Araiso Private High School Student Council Executive Committee (2002), Igarashi Tohru

=== Drama CDs ===
- Ao no Kiseki series 1: Ao no Kiseki (Sandra)
- Ao no Kiseki series 2: Catharsis Spell (Sandra)
- Ao no Kiseki series 3: Crystal Crown (Sandra)
- Ao no Kiseki series 4: Baroque Pearl (Sandra)
- Ao no Kiseki series 5: Persona Non Grata (Sandra)
- Ao no Kiseki series 6: Phantom Pain (Sandra)

=== Dubbing ===
==== Live-action ====
- Addams Family Values, Wednesday Addams (Christina Ricci)
- Annabelle: Creation, Esther Mullins (Miranda Otto)
- Autumn in New York, Charlotte Fielding (Winona Ryder)
- Back to the Future (2014 BS Japan edition), Stella Baines (Frances Lee McCain)
- Can't Hardly Wait, Amanda Beckett (Jennifer Love Hewitt)
- Charlotte's Web, Phyllis Arable (Essie Davis)
- Desperado (1998 TV Asahi edition), Carolina (Salma Hayek)
- Dudley Do-Right, Nell Fenwick (Sarah Jessica Parker)
- EDtv, Shari (Jenna Elfman)
- Existenz, Allegra Geller (Jennifer Jason Leigh)
- Falling Down (1997 TV Asahi edition), Detective Sandra Torres (Rachel Ticotin)
- The Full Monty, Mandy (Emily Woof)
- Good Will Hunting, Skylar (Minnie Driver)
- High Fidelity, Charlie Nicholson (Catherine Zeta-Jones)
- How to Make an American Quilt, Finn Dodd (Winona Ryder)
- I Know What You Did Last Summer, Julie James (Jennifer Love Hewitt)
- I Know What You Did Last Summer (2025), Julie James (Jennifer Love Hewitt)
- Into the Wild, Billie McCandless (Marcia Gay Harden)
- Jumanji, Sarah Whittle (Bonnie Hunt)
- Knock Off, Ling Ho (Carman Lee)
- The Lazarus Project, Elisabeth Wesley (Caroline Quentin)
- Master and Commander: The Far Side of the World, Midshipman Lord William Blakeney (Max Pirkis)
- Mystery Date, Geena Matthews (Teri Polo)
- North Face (2020 BS Tokyo edition), Elisabeth Landauer (Petra Morzé)
- Old School, Heidi (Juliette Lewis)
- Psycho, Marion Crane (Anne Heche)
- The Rainmaker, Kelly Riker (Claire Danes)
- Reality Bites, Lelaina Pierce (Winona Ryder)
- The River Wild, Roarke Hartman (Joseph Mazzello)
- RoboCop 3, Nikko Halloran (Remy Ryan)
- Rough Magic, Myra Shumway (Bridget Fonda)
- Scary Movie, Buffy Gilmore (Shannon Elizabeth)
- The Sinner, Sonya Barzel (Jessica Hecht)
- Stanley & Iris, Kelly King (Martha Plimpton)
- The Thirteenth Floor, Natasha Molinaro, Jane Fuller (Gretchen Mol)
- The Wisdom of Crocodiles, Anne Levels (Elina Löwensohn)

==== Animation ====
- Kid vs. Kat, Fiona
- American McGee's Alice, Alice Liddell
- Hey Arnold!: The Movie, Helga Pataki
- Moomins on the Riviera, The Mymble's Daughter
- Ultimate Spider-Man, Morgan le Fay
- X-Men, Rogue
