= Tenchi Muyo! GXP =

Television series

天地無用! GXP (Tenchi Muyō! Jī Ekkusu Pī)
- Anime television series
- Directed by: Shinichi Watanabe
- Produced by: Yamashita Hiroshi; Ueda Yasuo; Ohashi Yutaka; Inoue Hiroaki
- Written by: Yōsuke Kuroda
- Music by: Akifumi Tada
- Studio: AIC
- Licensed by: NA: Crunchyroll
- Original network: Nippon TV
- English network: US: Colours TV, Funimation Channel, Adult Swim (Toonami), Anime Selects
- Original run: April 3, 2002 – September 25, 2002
- Episodes: 26
- Manga
- Written by: Masaki Kajishima
- Published by: Kadokawa Shoten
- Magazine: Monthly Dragon Age
- Original run: June 2002 – September 2002
- Volumes: 1
- Novel series
- Written by: Masaki Kajishima
- Published by: Kadokawa Shoten
- Imprint: Fujimi Fantasia Bunko
- Original run: April 25, 2003 – present
- Volumes: 18
- Original video animation

Tenchi Muyo GXP Paradise Starting
- Directed by: Hiroshi Negishi (chief); Takashi Asami
- Produced by: Masayoshi Matsumoto
- Written by: Hideki Shirane
- Music by: Hiroshi Nakamura
- Studio: AIC (Note: Production only. AIC's animation studio went defunct in 2015 according to former AIC animator Atsushi Okuda, leaving the studio without the capability of animating its own projects in-house.); Saber Project (Note: Production only. Saber Project is a production studio, but does not have its own animation studio.); DNA (Note: Abbreviation for Digital Network Animation. It later changed its trade name to Saber Works after being acquired by Saber Project.) (Note: Although credited as Animation Production Assistance (アニメーション制作協力) below both AIC and Saber Project, neither company has a production studio, leaving Digital Network Animation (later Saber Works) and Zero-G as the production sites of the series.); Zero-G (4–6)
- Licensed by: Crunchyroll
- Released: May 26, 2023 – October 27, 2023
- Runtime: 30 minutes
- Episodes: 6
- Related series
- 1. Tenchi Muyo! Ryo-Ohki; 2. Tenchi Muyo! War on Geminar; 3. Tenchi Universe; 4. Tenchi in Tokyo; 5. Ai Tenchi Muyo!

Tenchi Muyo! GXP (天地無用! GXP, Tenchi Muyō! Jī Ekkusu Pī) is a Japanese anime television series animated by AIC and broadcast on NTV from April to September 2002. It is the fourth installment of the Tenchi Muyo! line of series, succeeding Tenchi in Tokyo, localized in North America by Funimation. On November 11, 2012, it began airing on Adult Swim's revived Toonami programming block. An anime OVA project titled Tenchi Muyo! GXP Paradise Shidō-hen by AIC and Saber Project was released from May to October 2023.

== Plot ==
Seina Yamada is a young Japanese high school student living with his parents and younger sister in rural Okayama, Japan. One morning, following a hapless bike ride through the country, a large spacecraft crashes into the lake behind the Masaki residence, causing a violent tsunami that Seina is unable to escape from and he sinks, almost drowning. He regains consciousness shortly after, meeting Amane Kaunaq, the spacecraft's pilot, who gives Seina an application. Seina takes it, and shows it to his family at home. Mistaking it for a contest entry, his mother and sister aggressively force him to fill it out; afterwards he retreats to his room and falls asleep. The following morning, awakened aboard a vessel in orbit, Seina is informed by an official that he has successfully joined the Galaxy Police. It also revealed that the Galaxy Police originally meant to recruit Tenchi, but they got Seina instead.

=== Setting ===
Unlike Tenchi Universe and Tenchi in Tokyo, which are spin-offs of Tenchi Muyo! Ryo-Ohki, GXP occurs during the same time period, making it a parallel series to the show. As such, the more-recognized cast do not play central roles, though they do make cameo appearances.

== Characters ==
Seina Yamada (山田 西南, Yamada Seina)
Voiced by: Shigeru Mogi (TV series), Hirofumi Nojima (OVA) (Japanese); Tony Oliver (English)
The unlikely protagonist of the series, Seina, a fifteen-year-old high school student with a supernatural penchant for bad luck (for himself AND for anyone around him), is mistakenly enlisted to the Galaxy Police after being coerced to fill out an application, which was meant to be given to Tenchi (his role model, who he addresses as "senpai"). His ultimate decision is to enroll, finding that, in the company of others and as the captain of his own ship, his otherwise unfortunate talent proves incredibly useful in rounding up pirates and other lawbreakers (leading to his nickname 'Lorelei Seina', as he is something of a siren in his ability to attract pirates).
Amane Kaunaq (雨音 カウナック, Amane Kaunakku)
Voiced by: Mariko Suzuki (Japanese); Dorothy Elias-Fahn (English)
Amane is a twenty-year-old Galaxy Police Detective 2nd Class whose crash-landing on Earth at the start of the series is solely responsible for the events that later ensue. Her mission was to give the application to Tenchi, but she mistook Seina as Tenchi's apprentice. In spite of her justified decision to give Seina an application, her long-awaited promotion to Detective 1st Class was postponed and she was temporarily re-assigned as a GP Academy instructor for the semester in order to personally supervise and train Seina. With a genuine crush and empathy for the boy, Amane grows to like her new responsibility, becoming Ship's Weapons Specialist (Tactical Officer) when Seina is given command of, first, the Kamidake and then later the Kamidake II, and the group are assigned their own patrol.
Kiriko Masaki (正木 霧恋, Masaki Kiriko)
Voiced by: Kumi Sakuma (Japanese); Wendee Lee (English)
Kiriko is a twenty-four-year-old Immigration Officer for the Galaxy Police, whose double life in the agency is completely unknown to her family and peers on Earth (save for her mother and of-age members of the Masaki Village). Having grown up around Seina and developed a sympathy for his misfortune, she is the one most familiar with him and self-assigns herself the role of being his legal guardian and caretaker when he is accepted to the academy. In a manner identical to that of Amane (but with a suspicion that Lady Seto is behind it as a way to keep her close to Seina), she too is re-assigned to the GP Academy as an instructor for the semester. She becomes Ship's OS Officer when Seina is given command of, first, the Kamidake and then later the Kamidake II, and the group are assigned their own patrol.
Ryoko Balta (リョーコ バルタ, Ryōko Baruta)
Voiced by: Aya Hisakawa (Japanese); Barbara Goodson (English)
Ryoko is a nineteen-year-old space pirate captain and member of the notorious Da Ruma guild, who in spite of her ruthless profile, exhibits behavior quite the opposite of her profession (even becoming something of a celebrity among GP members). She is introduced to Seina early into his travel to the academy, bestowing a humble, competitive respect for him when his paranormal luck aids in the arrest of several dozen pirate ships. Her admiration for him develops into a more passionate one, however, and Ryoko finds herself caught between her feelings and her allegiance to the guild (especially when the families of her crew are held hostage). However, events work out for the best and she becomes not only a full-member of the GP but also Ship's Pilot when Seina is given command of, first, the Kamidake and then later the Kamidake II, and the group are assigned their own patrol. As a part of her body enhancement (performed when she was a newborn), Ryoko is able to transmute her body to assume other guises, including the Wau Erma and a mermaid. Her parents named her after the legendary Ryoko Hakubi, the only space pirate to have ever taken-on planet Jurai's defences.
Neju Na Melmas (ネージュ ナ メルマス, Nēju Na Merumasu)
Voiced by: Nana Mizuki (Japanese); Sandy Fox (English)
Neju, contrary to her stature and demeanor, is a two-thousand-year-old former priestess of Melmas, a distant planet of religious psychics. Following a brief, unelaborate encounter with Seina, she makes a more established presence when he and the group are asked to escort her aboard their ship. To the blatant annoyance of the other girls, she immediately grows fond of Seina, treating him as an older brother figure and even making plans to marry him. Having fulfilled her term as Melmas' high-priestess, Neju accepts Lady Seto's suggestion to enlist at the GP Academy, rather than return to secular life back on Melmas, as there was a hit on her. After a brief course at the Academy, Neju is assigned to the Kamidake II, and the group are assigned their own patrol.
Fuku (福, Fuku)
Voiced by: Tomoko Kaneda (TV series), Chie Nakamura (OVA) (Japanese); Lara Cody (English)
Fuku is an infantile cabbit, developed as the nucleus of Seina's succeeding vessel, the Kamidake II. As the heart and powerhouse of the ship, Fuku exercises superseding control over its entirety, most notably its energy output, which is influenced by her emotional vigor. She is initially troubled by the stress of belligerence, stunting her from exercising full potential, but soon thanks to Seina's affection and support (later backed by that of the other girls) finds the strength to rise to the occasion and become a vital member of the crew.
NB
Voiced by: Shinichi Watanabe (Japanese); Bob Papenbrook (English)
NB was originally a "NB Reasoning Unit" A.I. helper robot, specifically a new test model likely modified for Seina (according to Seina's dormmates, Kenneth and Rajau), that Seina was issued when he enrolled in the G.P. Academy. During Seina's re-training after his body-enhancement, Kiriko and Erma (Ryoko), not trusting Amane alone with Seina, added a video camera for surveillance; however, a short circuit, caused by Amane's modifications and some weird extra installed programming, altered the personality of the robot. NB's still the helper robot it was originally designed for, but now it has the personality and motivations of a voyeuristic pervert. NB is almost never found without its camera, hoping to catch girls in various stages of undress (and a weird obsession with chikuwa (a Japanese fish sausage). Unfortunately for NB, the girls usually do catch it, and the end result is NB getting dented. He finally meets his match in Nabiko, a female version of himself that has been programmed to be "intimate" with him and which, despite his desperate attempts to flee from her, finally catches him and makes him, to his horror, "impure". In the series' epilogue, it is shown that he ends up the father to a huge family of little NB's and a henpecked husband.
Airi Masaki (柾木 アイリ)
Voiced by: Sakiko Tamagawa (Japanese); Renee Emerson (English)
Airi Masaki was first introduced in the third series of the Tenchi Muyo! Ryo-Ohki OVA and becomes a regular member of the Techi Muyo! GXP cast in Episode 4. She is Tenchi Masaki's grandmother, but anyone mentioning the fact that she is a grandmother had better run fast...she never likes to hear that she is a grandmother; Seina found this out when, as part of a joke played on him by Amane, he called Airi 'Granny' when her back was turned to him. When Seina found out, he was terrified (mostly because Airi was holding a chef's knife at the time), and she made him write lines as punishment.
She is the chairwoman for the Galaxy Police Academy and works closely with the Academy's headmistress Mikami Kuramitsu. She also has a love for cooking, and would be found in one of the GP Academy's restaurants practicing her skills. While a tough but fair administrator, she demonstrates some affection for Seina (feeling jealous of Seto for being able to hang around with Seina while she (Airi) is stuck doing paperwork and crying out for Seina to come back to regular GP duty when she gets overwhelmed by the mountains of paperwork) and shows respect for his being able to take Tarant Shank out by himself.
Seto Kamiki Jurai (神木 瀬戸 樹雷)
Voiced by: Yukari Nozawa (Japanese); Melora Harte (English)
Lady Seto is the mother of Empress Misaki, the adopted mother of Noike Jurai, the grandmother of Ayeka and Sasami and a very powerful 'behind the scenes' figure in Juraian politics...so much that because of her political craftiness and occasionally violent temper, she is referred to as "The Devil Princess of Jurai". She is married to the Kamiki clan head Utsutsumi Kamiki.
Her tree/ship, Mikagami, is known for her special attack: The Triple Z (AKA the "Genocidal Dance"), which literally causes all enemies to freeze in their tracks; either due to an Electromagnetic Pulse or some other mechanism (though the effect of this is left to the viewer's imagination) followed by almost total obliteration, and this attack is as much feared by her allies as her enemies because of her enjoyment of using it. Due to her past (see her entry in "List of Tenchi Muyo! supporting characters", she has an intense hatred of pirates.
Seto has a reputation as an unofficial "matchmaker" in the Jurai empire and has been known to arrange marriages either to cement alliances or just to see happens for her own amusement. She is behind the four-bride wedding at the close of the series,
While a lesser character in the Tenchi Muyo! Ryo-Ohki series, Lady Seto has a bigger and more influential role in Tenchi Muyo! GXP, first meeting Seina Yamada when his transport ship was under attack by pirates. Seeing how Seina's bad luck could be useful not only for the GP but for herself, she effectively takes Seina under her wing by helping him enter the GP Academy (feeling like the academy could use a little chaos once in a while) and requesting Mikami Kuramitsu to have Kiriko Masaki reassigned as an instructor at the Academy in order to train Seina to become a man. She enjoy teasing Seina (by sending her handmaidens to romantically harass him and once even offering to scrub his back!) but also has a great respect for him and seems to enjoy that Seina is a constant surprise to her: first, in their initial encounter by rounding up a huge batch of pirate ships that the Juraian fleet hadn't been able to capture for months; next, by dealing with the Daluma pirate guild's Good Luck Fleet in the first encounter (after it had escaped from her own fleet); finally, by bringing back the mecha that he found on the Wau planet, which turned out to contain a first generation Juraian seed and which meant that since the seed had bonded with Seina, he was now part of the Jurai royal family and third in line for the throne. Seto is suspected of being aware of her handmaidens' true loyalties when they kidnap Seina and prefers to see how the chase turns out rather than interfere.
Mitoto Kuramitsu (九羅密 美兎跳)
Voiced by: Yūko Mizutani (Japanese); Kari Wahlgren (English)
Mitoto Kuramitsu is the daughter of Minami, as well as the mother of Mihoshi and Misao. Mitoto works as an extremely enthusiastic sanitation engineer (cleaning lady) for the Galaxy Police. She met Seina when he was first taken from Earth to the GP Academy, and was taken by Seina's hair, which she constantly pets. Since then, Mitoto would be occasionally popping into Seina's life from time-to-time, often helping him out during certain events in the boy's life.
Seiryō Tennan (天南 静竜, Tennan Seiryō)
Voiced by: Mitsuaki Madono (Japanese); Richard Cansino/Kirk Thornton (English) (Toonami version; the redub was necessary due to Seiryo's original English voice sounding too effeminate).
After his humiliating "defeat" by Tenchi Masaki, Seiryō developed a personal hatred for all Earthlings, a grudge which would continue on into Tenchi Muyō! GXP. He holds a teacher's position at the Galaxy Police Academy, and immediately develops a distaste for the human Seina Yamada when he becomes a cadet.
Seina becomes Seiryō's unwitting nemesis, constantly foiling his endless idiotic plots for revenge (mostly through Seina's streak of bad luck). Having rebounded from his missed shot at Ayeka, Seiryō becomes infatuated again by childhood acquaintance Amane, despite being frequently and violently rejected; her attachment to Seina only serves to deepen his hatred for the young recruit, so much so that in Episode 6, Seiryō deliberately holds up the necessary body augmentation that Seina needed to at least survive life at the academy. However, Mikami Kuramitsu found out and punished Seriyō by assigning him to clean toilets... with her niece Mitoto supervising.
Seiryō is brash and overconfident, often severely embarrassing himself through acts of sheer incompetence. However, he is also an accomplished fighter, and is quite proficient with a lightsword.
After Amane allowed him to be captured by Kyo Komachi's pirates in Episode 9, Seiryō learns during Episode 18 that, after long haggling over the ransom, the Tennan family has instead signed a supply contract with the Daluma pirate guild; Seiryō follows his father's orders to assist the pirates (his family's motto being "The Customer/Client is God!" ("Otokui Kami-Sama wa" ("御得大神は"))) and becomes the captain of the Daluma guild's new anti-Seina Good Luck Fleet, constructing the Fleet's flagship, Seiryo becomes the captain of the Daluma guild's anti-Seina Good Luck Fleet's flagship; in a stunning display of idiocy, Seriyō names his flagship "Unko" after all the other ships in the Daluma guild's anti-Seina Good Luck Fleet's flagship had taken many of the "perfect good luck names". (運呼, "Unko" which could mean "Luck Bringer" in Japanese... is also translated as うんこ, lit. "poop", a childish word for "excrement", when spoken aloud).
After fighting the G.P. ship Kamidake II to a standstill twice, Lady Seto decides to resolve the whole situation by issuing a challenge to Seiryō in Seina's name to an official duel. However, during the duel when Seina slips on a piece of candy, his Shock Baton gets caught in Seiryō's belt and loosens it completely, causing Seiryō's pants to fall down and exposing his red fundoshi (loincloth) and costing Seiryō another match via embarrassment.
At the end of the series, Seiryō works as the head waiter at a space station behind Earth's moon, where Seina's wedding was being held, as the station was owned by the Tennan family. While there, he encounters space pirate and former captor Kyō Komachi, and proposes to her after revealing that it was her birthday.
Tarant Shank (九羅密 美兎跳)
Voiced by: Yuki Matsuda (Japanese); Kim Strauss (English)
Tarant Shank is one of the main antagonists from Tenchi Muyo! GXP and becomes the main villain in Episode 10. He is a member of the dreaded Daluma Guild, but is also the most bloodthirsty and cruel of all the pirates, feared by both the Galaxy Police and his peers. He is captain of the Daidalos, and though sadistic enough to pass up an easy kill to instill more terror in his prey, is a survivalist and cowardly at heart, using others (even his own subordinates) as a shield when plans go awry and he has to escape.
Shank has a grudge against GP officer Seina Yamada before ever meeting him, namely because his "incompetent old man" was captured in Seina's first great lure before he actually arrived at the GP Academy, and continues his vendetta against Seina throughout the series, but, whether because of Seina's bad-luck which affects pirates or for some other reason, Tarant usually winds up on the losing end of each encounter, also losing a part of his body which is cybernetically replaced. Another source of his rage is because of his further fall from grace after a loss to Seiryo with light swords, upending his chances of commanding the newest flagship of the Daluma fleet and causing him to strike out on his own. He later forms an alliance with a rogue faction within the Galaxy Army to abduct Fuku and the Kamidake II in order to learn the ship's secrets, but is thwarted again by Seina and though injured manages to flee. He makes a final attempt on Seina's life on the boy's wedding day, but is trapped and captured single-handedly by Seina.
Kyo Komachi
Voiced by: Romi Park (Japanese); Jessica Gee (English)
Kyo Komachi is a pirate captain and member of the Daluma Pirate Guild. Physically, she is very commanding, extremely tall and muscular with indigo hair, and is one of the more sensible and honorable members of the Guild. She first appears in Episode 9 when her ship attacks the training vessel captained by Seiryo Tennan that Seina is serving on. Her light-sword battle with Seiryo is cut short when the ship's systems go haywire and she and Seiryo are enveloped in sealant gel, but Seina's quick action keeps them all from being drowned in the gel and earns her respect. Since she and Seiryo are intertwined in the gel, her crew are unable to cut her free without harming Seiryo, so they are forced to take him with them when they escape; however, in gratitude for Seina's saving her life, she warns him about Tarant. When Ryoko is ordered by the Guild to have Seina assassinated, she strongly objects and later uses an arranged escape by Seiryo as a distraction to cover her rescue of the families of Ryoko's crew that Shank was holding hostage. She becomes Seiryo's second-in-command when he joins the Daluma Guild and is given command of the Unko (a name she desperately tries to keep him from announcing out loud, since it translates as "excrement"), and tries to provide some sense of stability (since Seiryo as a pirate captain is, to put it mildly, somewhat unstable). She accompanies him when he goes to face Seina in a one-on-one duel, but asks Seina privately to just play along with Seiryo. After Fuku and the Kamidake are taken by rogue Galaxy Army personnel, she provides information that aids Kiriko, Amane, Ryoko and Neiju in locating them and Seina (who has gone in pursuit on his own). In the final episode, it is revealed that Seina's wedding day is the same date as her birthday and she and Seiryo begin a personal (romantic) relationship.

=== Minor characters ===
Alan, Berry and Cohen (アラン・バリー・コーン,)
Voiced by: Jun Fukuyama (Japanese); Tom Fahn (English) (Alan)
Voiced by: Koichi Nagano (Japanese); Kirk Thornton (English) (Berry)
Voiced by: Yusuke Numata (Japanese); Dan Lorge (English) (Cohen)
Alan, Barry, and Cohen are recurring characters in Tenchi Muyo! GXP. These three made their appearance in the second episode. All three of them were on board the G.P. cruiser that had picked up Seina to transport him to the G.P. Academy. It was during the trip that they ran into Ryoko Balta's ship, where they immediately "surrendered". It turns out that the three are rabid fans of the space pirate, but were crushed when she took a liking to Seina. When Seina was given command of the original Kamidake, they became part of his crew, but were later reassigned to another GP ship. When that ship was captured by pirates, they gave themselves up as hostages to save the rest of the crew, but because of the gorgeous pirate girls switched their allegiance to the Daluma pirate guild, even eventually serving on board Seriyo Tennan's ship Unko.
Kenneth Barl and Rajau Ga Waura (ラジャウ・ガ・ワウラ)
Voiced by: Kenji Nojima (Japanese); Steve Staley (English) (Kenneth Barl)
Voiced by: Susumu Chiba (Japanese); Tony Oliver (English) (Rajau Ga Waura)
Kenneth Barl, a human, and Rajau Ga Waura, a Wau, were Seina's classmates and roommates at the GP Academy. Occasionally, the two would be featured in some point in Seina's life in the GP, sometimes monitoring a satellite guarding Earth, mostly to protect members of the Jurai Royal family living there. Rajau became enamored of Erma, never realizing that Erma was one of Ryoko Balta's guises.

=== Paradise Shidō-hen ===
Tsukiko Masaki
Voiced by: Satsuki Yukino
Miki Steinbeck
Voiced by: Rie Tanaka
Kirche
Voiced by: Megumi Toyoguchi
D
Voiced by: Ai Uchikawa
Jovia Jovis
Voiced by: Ryoka Yuzuki
Tenchi Masaki
Voiced by: Masami Kikuchi
Washū Hakubi
Voiced by: Yuko Kobayashi
Mikami Kuramitsu
Voiced by: Yoko Soumi
Zinv

== Production ==
Tenchi Muyo! GXP was officially announced on January 10, 2001, with a scheduled broadcast set for spring of the following year. When asked to direct the series, Shinichi Watanabe, though welcome to the opportunity, was cited as saying that he was unsure why he had been chosen, and that after watching previous Tenchi episodes, found the task of envisioning GXP to be "tough".

First looks into the series was published on October 10 by Tenchi-Web.com, showcasing artwork and teaser trailer. More trailers were progressively added from November 2001 to February 2002 when it was announced on February 18 that GXP would premier on NTV on April 2. Tenchi-web then, a day later, scheduled a preview screening of the first and second episodes in Tokyo. In a similar fashion, Los Angeles based Anime Expo confirmed the attendance of Mamiko Noto, voice actress for the series, and that AIC would host a screening of GXP at the convention. Funimation later confirmed from Anime Expo New York that they had secured the licensing rights to the show.

GXP finished airing on September 24. Following a nine-month period, Funimation unveiled the official English website for the series on June 16, 2003, later confirming its release for March 4, 2004.

A new anime project titled Tenchi Muyo GXP Paradise Starting was announced by EXNOA on December 23, 2022. It was later confirmed that the project would be an OVA series animated by AIC and Saber Project and directed by Takashi Asami, with Hiroshi Negishi serving as chief director, Hideki Shirane writing and supervising series' scripts, Nana Hiiragi designing the characters and Digital Network Animation credited for animation production assistance. The series ran for six episodes released on a monthly basis from May 26 to October 27, 2023. Crunchyroll licensed the series.

== Broadcast history ==
Tenchi Muyo! GXP aired on Colours TV's Funimation block in 2006 from June 24 to September 17. Also aired in Hawaii on KIKU starting September 2006. Aired periodically on Funimation Channel.

It began airing on Adult Swim's newly revived Toonami programming block on November 11, 2012, at 12:30 a.m. ET where it remained for 3 weeks until it was bumped to 1 a.m. to make way for Naruto, which claimed the 12:30 a.m. slot. 2 weeks later, it was moved to 3 a.m. due to lower than expected ratings where it remained for the rest of its run. GXP is the fourth Tenchi Muyo! series to air on Toonami (the original OVAs, Tenchi Universe and Tenchi in Tokyo having been aired on the original Toonami in an edited form).

== Reception ==
Tenchi Muyo! GXP was met with mostly positive reception. It was initially believed that the premiere would not draw noteworthy attention, but the midnight screening of the first episode on September 9 reportedly garnered a 4.0% viewing share, a figure considered double that of other premiers such as Aquarian Age and Kanon.

The localization of Tenchi Muyo! GXP was met with generally positive reception as well. In a report by Right Stuf International on February 28, AIC became flooded with so much mail from American fans about its release that the company requested fans stop. Industry aggregator Mania.com gave the commercial releases ratings A through B, citing that "the GXP series was a lot of fun" but that "[it] was over by the time you really get into it." Animefringe.com, an online magazine, published a positive review as well, citing a "well balanced storyline" and that GXP "still has plenty of potential to go forward and compete in today's booming anime world after its long absence from the spotlight."

== Media ==
=== Manga ===
Masaki Kajishima, original creator of the Tenchi series, wrote and illustrated a manga for GXP, serialized in Comic Dragon (now Monthly Dragon Age) from June to September 2002. It was collected into a single volume and published by Kadokawa Shoten on August 29, 2002.

=== Novels ===
In addition to the manga, Kajishima also writes an ongoing light novel series retelling GXP from his perspective. The books were published by Kadokawa Shoten and go into more detail than the anime. The first volume was released on April 25, 2003. As of June 20, 2025, 18 books have been released.
