= Shigeru Mogi =

Japanese voice actor (born 1973)

Shigeru Mogi (茂木 滋, Mogi Shigeru; born 19 August 1973 in Kanagawa Prefecture) is a Japanese voice actor affiliated with 81 Produce.

== Voice roles ==
=== Anime television series ===
- Desert Punk (小出水満)
- Major 2nd series (Yabe)
- Mirmo! (Shichirō)
- Tenchi Muyo! GXP (Seina Yamada)

=== Game ===
- Judie no Atelier
- Princess Maker

=== Dubbing ===
- Fight Back to School
- Jimmy Two-Shoes - Sammy
- "Mickey Mouse Clubhouse- Toodles
