= Tenchi Muyo! War on Geminar =

Japanese OVA series

- Cover for the Japanese Blu-ray Box set.

異世界の聖機師物語 (Isekai no Seikishi Monogatari)
- Genre: Isekai
- Created by: Masaki Kajishima
- Original video animation
- Directed by: Koji Yoshikawa
- Produced by: Shoji Ohta; Yasuo Ueda; Yoshiyuki Matsuzaki
- Written by: Hideki Shirane
- Music by: Akifumi Tada
- Studio: AIC Spirits; BeSTACK
- Licensed by: NA: Crunchyroll
- Released: March 20, 2009 – March 19, 2010
- Runtime: 51 minutes (ep.1); 45 minutes (eps. 2–13)
- Episodes: 13
- Light novel
- Written by: Masaki Kajishima (Original story); Atsushi Wada
- Illustrated by: Katsumi Enami
- Published by: Fujimi Shobo
- Imprint: Fujimi Fantasia Bunko
- Published: August 20, 2009
- Manga
- Written by: Masaki Kajishima (Original story)
- Illustrated by: Bau
- Published by: Ichijinsha
- Magazine: Comic REX
- Published: June 9, 2010
- Volumes: 2
- Related series
- 1. Tenchi Muyo! Ryo-Ohki; 2. Tenchi Muyo! GXP; 3. Tenchi Universe; 4. Tenchi in Tokyo; 5. Ai Tenchi Muyo!
- icon

Isekai no Seikishi Monogatari (異世界の聖機師物語; lit. Sage Machine Master Story in the Different World), which was released in North America as Tenchi Muyo! War on Geminar is a Japanese OVA series. It is a spin-off of the Tenchi Muyo! series, which was created by Masaki Kajishima. Produced by AIC Spirits and BeSTACK, the series aired thirteen episodes on pay-per-view network Animax between March 20, 2009, and March 19, 2010.

It chronicles the story of a young boy named Kenshi Masaki, the younger half-brother of Tenchi Muyo!'s protagonist Tenchi, who is transported to the world of Geminar. The story shares some character names and general terms from the anime Photon, another series created by Masaki Kajishima.

A light novel adaptation by Atsushi Wada was published by Fujimi Shobo on August 20, 2009, under their Fujimi Fantasia Bunko imprint. A manga adaptation was serialized in Comic REX and published by Ichijinsha on June 9, 2010, spanning two volumes. At Otakon 2012, Funimation Entertainment announced they had licensed the series for release in North America.

The anime is part of the Tenchi Muyo! Ryo-Ohki continuity, taking place 15 years after the events of Tenchi Muyo! GXP.

== Plot ==
Kenshi Masaki is a 15-year-old boy that has unwillingly traveled from his home on Earth to the alternate world of Geminar (ジェミナー, Jeminā). On Geminar, the countries wage wars using Sacred Mechanoids, humanoid exoskeletal weapons that were originally discovered within ancient ruins and developed over centuries. After being tricked by a mysterious organization into participating in an attempt to assassinate Lashara Earth XXVIII, the young ruler of the Shtrayu Empire, he ends up captured after he chooses not to kill her. Deducing enough about Kenshi to interest her and because his abilities make him an extremely valuable property, Lashara decides to take Kenshi under her protection.

Disguised as her attendant, Kenshi travels with her and her bodyguard Chiaia Flann to the Holy Land, a virtually impregnable fortress that serves as an academy to train Sacred Mechanoid pilots (Mechamasters), most of whom are female. With his kindness, tenacity, and skills that vary from carpentry and cooking to advanced survival techniques, Kenshi eventually becomes a celebrity in the academy as well as the object of affection of many female students, making some of the male students envious. However, the same organization that deceived Kenshi is secretly working inside and against the academy, and a worldwide conflict is about to begin.

== Characters ==
=== Main ===
Kenshi Masaki (柾木 剣士, Masaki Kenshi)
Voiced by: Hiro Shimono (Japanese); Jason Liebrecht (English)
Kenshi, the main protagonist of the series, is a 15-year-old boy from Earth. He is the younger half-brother of Tenchi Masaki, son of Tenchi's father Nobuyuki Masaki and his second wife, Rea. Just like his brother, Kenshi's kindness, strength and courage have led most of the girls he befriends to become infatuated with him. Kenshi is a boy of many talents, ranging from swordsmanship to cooking and housekeeping, which revealed that he was trained and learned from his family. It is suggested he might have feelings for Yukine, Aura and Doll/Mexiah.

Lashara Earth XXVIII (ラシャラ・アース二十八世, Rashara Āsu Nījūhasei)
Voiced by: Madoka Yonezawa (Japanese); Jad Saxton (English)
Lashara is the 12-year-old ruler of the Shtrayu Empire. She inherited the throne following her father's death, but as the series begins she is traveling away to school in the Holy Land. She slowly loses her position of power to Babalun as the series progresses. She is notorious for being extremely thrifty, as her kingdom is currently in debt. She takes Kenshi in as an attendant and she and Chiaia keep Kenshi's identity a secret until he shows his capabilities in battling the Sacred Mechanoids of Dagmyer. Lashara is the niece of Queen Flora and always refers to herself using the majestic plural. It is hinted that she has romantic feelings for Kenshi, but given her circumstances, she is not allowed to show such emotions. Her personal vessel is the Swan (スワン, Suwan). Her name is a reference to Lashara Moon and Photon Earth from Kajishima's earlier work, Photon.

Chiaia Flan (キャイア・フラン, Kyaia Furan)
Voiced by: Natsuko Kuwatani (Japanese); Morgan Garrett (English)
Chiaia is Lashara's personal escort and bodyguard, charged with protecting her life at all costs. She also attends Holy Land Academy to complete her Sacred Mechamaster training, and officially becomes a Sacred Mechamaster at the end of Episode 2. She is very skilled at combat, being able to imitate Kenshi's unusual Sacred Mechanoid fighting style after only seeing it once. She has a crush on her childhood friend Dagmyer, which caused her to ignore clues regarding his schemes until it was too late. She frequently gets upset with both Kenshi and Lashara, and Chiaia's temper is one of the few things that both Lashara and Kenshi seem to be wary of. While not happy about it, she agrees to go along with Lashara's scheme to hide the fact that Kenshi is both the Sacred Mechanoid pilot that tried to kill her and from another world. Her Sacred Mechanoid is pink and red with a fox-like tail, and uses a longsword as her primary weapon. She realizes she might have feelings for Kenshi when she sees him wearing the pendant with the red cord she made. Another instance is when she is manipulated by Dagmyer to kill Kenshi, but cannot bring herself to do it. Her reactions around Kenshi have caused others to remark that they act like a pair of siblings (with her as the older sister), and despite her complaining that he always causes trouble, she is ready to risk her own life for Kenshi and joins in the chase for him at the end of the final episode.

Maria Nanadan (マリア・ナナダン)
Voiced by: Momoko Saito (Japanese); Tia Ballard (English)
Maria is the young princess from the country of Havoniwa who currently attends Holy Land Academy along with Lashara. She and Lashara are cousins, but they are not fond of each other and constantly engage in contests of one-upmanship. She, like Lashara, refers to herself with the majestic plural. She is very close to her servant Yukine and is rarely seen without her. Maria is the daughter of Queen Flora, and is frequently embarrassed by her mother's antics. She supports Yukine into having Kenshi fall for her (Yukine), and has recently shown that she too has feelings for him. Her family name is a reference to Sir Papacharino Nanadan from Kajishima's earlier work Photon.

Yukine Mare (ユキネ・メア, Yukine Mea)
Voiced by: Mie Sonozaki (Japanese); Kristi Kang (English)
Yukine is the faithful personal servant of Maria, with her quiet and shy demeanor hiding both a very talented skillset and expert combat skills; during the attack on the resort, she wields a sword similar to a khanda. Yukine acts as Maria's primary information-gatherer, and the two of them are able to figure out that Kenshi is the Sacred Mechanoid pilot that attacked Lashara. There is a clear mutual attraction between Kenshi and Yukine, and the two have been mistaken for a couple on multiple occasions. She is from a clan that protects a temple dedicated to the Choushin, but lets Kenshi compress it into a sword. Her Sacred Mechanoid is a mixture of light colors with moth antennae and a mane armed with a railgun and jets that allows her to travel at supersonic speeds.

Wahanly Shmei (ワウアンリー・シュメ, Wauanrī Shume)
Voiced by: Rie Nakagawa (Japanese); Cherami Leigh (English)
Nicknamed "Wau" (ワウ), she is a good friend of Lashara, a brilliant inventor and a genius when it comes to heavy artillery and gunpowder despite her poor aim. While she may appear to be a 15-year-old girl, her actual age is 97 due to difference in time flow at the Barrier Workshop, where she lived prior to moving to the Swan with the others. She later invented the Mechaworker, a steam-powered mechanoid resembling an Uchikoma with greater maneuverability than that which a Sacred Mechanoid would provide. Her Sacred Mechanoid is brown with bull's horns made for heavy combat. Like Lashara and Chiaia, she has feelings for Kenshi, although she usually tries to test her machines' destructive abilities on him.

Lithia Po Cheeha (リチア・ポ・チーナ, Richia Po Chīna)
Voiced by: Kana Ōmura (Japanese); Caitlin Glass (English)
Lithia is the granddaughter of the current Pope of Geminar and President of The Holy Land Academy's Student Council. She is a harsh and sarcastic woman who often thinks of and refers to Kenshi as a "wild beast" (野生動物, Yasei Dōbutsu), and after the "massage" that was given to her (courtesy of Mexiah), she has referred to him as that ever since. She suffers from extreme stress due to the intense amount of work she has, and tends to pass out when she's overworked. However, she begins to feel more relaxed and enervated after Kenshi makes her some energy-increasing tea, though her sarcastic nature still remains. She also seems to fear Morga, the former Student Council President, because Morga, while extremely talented as a Sacred Mechamaster, does not work well with others and is also something of a lunatic in combat. Only in the last few episodes, although she still refers to Kenshi as a "wild beast", it is shown that she gets flustered around him and even when speaking about him, hinting she may also have feelings for him, and there is no doubt that she has grown to respect Kenshi greatly.

Aura Shurifon (アウラ・シュリフォン)
Voiced by: Junko Noda (Japanese); Lydia Mackay (English)
The Dark Elf Princess of the Shurifon Kingdom and a member of the Pilgrimage Route Guard. While she initially shows a very serious and sober personality, it is later revealed that her personality shifts based on the time of day; at certain times such as in the early morning, she has a much more innocent and girlish personality (this is because her kind were summoned by the Senshi Civilization to pilot the Sacred Mechalord, and her time of weakness shows that her people have not yet fully stabilized in this world). Initially, she admires Kenshi's wilderness skills, but grows to develop a romantic interest in him, even going so far as to feed him water mouth-to-mouth after he has passed out and then attempting to confess her feelings; on a few occasions, she and Kenchi have worked well together as a scouting team. When not dealing with school-related tasks, she is nearly always accompanied by two male retainers. Her Sacred Mechanoid is green and brown, armed with a crossbow, and has the ability to generate the Dark Elf Field, a powerful but physically taxing force field that can repel any enemy that comes in range.

=== Holy Land Academy ===
==== Students ====
Yeliss (イエリス, Ierisu), Bwoole (ブール, Būru), Gryino (グリノ, Gurino), and Wreda (レダ, Reda)
Yeliss Voiced by: Aki Unone (Japanese); Lindsay Seidel (English)
Bwoole Voiced by: Yumiko Akaike (Japanese); Allison Sumrall (English)
Gryino Voiced by: Ayano Ishikawa (Japanese); Ryan Reynolds (English)
Wreda Voiced by: Eri Taruta (Japanese); Michelle Rojas (English)
A quartet of students at Holy Land Academy, each having a crush on Kenshi. Each of the girls is named after a color, represented by their hair color and the Sacred Mechanoids they pilot; Yeliss is named after the color yellow, Bwoole after the color blue, Gryino after the color green, and Wreda after the color red. Out of the four, Wreda appears to be the de facto leader of the group.

Lapis Larz (ラピス・ラーズ, Rapisu Rāzu)
Voiced by: Hiromi Konno (Japanese); Alexis Tipton (English)
A student at Holy Land Academy and Lithia's assistant. It is shown that she has feelings for Kenshi, and her devotion to Lithia is such that she stays by Lithia's bedside while Lithia is recovering from her fever, then later risks her own life to protect Lithia when they are attacked by Dagmyer's cronies in their Sacred Mechanoids and in the battle in the ravine at the re-taking of The Holy Land defeats an enemy Sacred Mechanoid that has the upper hand over Lithia. Her own Sacred Mechanoid is yellow with a puff-tipped tail and a spear as her primary weapon.

Ceres Taito (セレス・タイト, Seresu Taito)
Voiced by: Takayuki Sasada (Japanese); Jessie James Grelle (English)
A student at Holy Land Academy who is in the same class as Kenshi. He is also a Sacred Mechamaster, but unlike most Sacred Mechamasters who are born in nobility, he was born into a common family. He is in love with a young girl named Hazuki (ハヅキ; Voiced by: Ayano Ishikawa), but because of his Sacred Mechamaster status, he cannot be seen with her. He was taken prisoner by Cordyline and her bandit group and later forced against his will to kill Kenshi when Cliff Clees, Lan and the bandits held Hazuki hostage, using a bomb installed on his Sacred Mechanoid's back to take both Kenshi and himself out. After the failed attempt, he and Hazuki later join Kenshi onboard the Swan following the events of "Barrier Workshop", and Ceres assists in the making of the Tenchi sword.

Morga (モルガ, Moruga)
Voiced by: Rie Hosoya (Japanese); Emily Neves (English)
The previous Student Council President who is now a knight for the Trible Royal Court. She only makes a brief appearance in the anime, but it is hinted that she and Lithia are not on good terms and that everyone who either knows or remembers her is extremely wary of her. Morga was shown to be a strong-headed and reckless Sacred Mechamaster who obliterates anything in her path. Her Sacred Mechanoid is red and black, and she uses a pair of axes to fight. Lithia states that while Morga is a skilled fighter, she lacks the ability to work as a member of a team.

==== Faculty ====
Headmistress (学院長, Gakuinchō)
Voiced by: Yumiko Akaike (Japanese); Nancy Sherrard (English)
The director of Holy Land Academy and chief administrator of the Holy Land.

Hannah (ハンナ, Hanna)
Voiced by: Erika Sudo (Japanese); Karen Bright (English)
A muscular woman who runs the underground operations of the Academy.

Jozzy (ジョジィ, Jojyi)
Voiced by: Tiaki Kanō (Japanese); Trina Nishimura (English)
One of Hannah's assistants and in charge of Laundry and Room Service at the Academy.

=== Antagonists ===
Doll (ドール, Dōru) / Mexiah Flan (メザイア・フラン, Mezaia Furan)
Doll Voiced by: Mai Goto (Japanese); Monica Rial (English)
Mexiah Voiced by: Ayumi Tsunematsu (Japanese); Jamie Marchi (English)
Doll is one of the three artificial humans created by the Senshi Civilization for the purpose of defeating the last Sacred Mechalord, Gaia. After Gaia's defeat, Doll/Mexiah's memory of the events was erased and she was buried along with the damaged Sacred Mechalord. Doll/Mexiah was eventually unearthed and discovered as an infant with pink hair by Naua Flan, who adopted her with the name Mexiah Flan, and she was raised as Chiaia's older sister. As Mexiah, she is a martial arts instructor at the Holy Land Academy and, unlike her serious sister, is shockingly affectionate toward Kenshi; however, there are also hints of her having lesbian relationships with some of the female students, all of whom worship her.

Doll has little regard for the importance of life, shown when she laughs while trying to kill Aura during an early encounter. Despite this, she feels an attraction to Kenshi that she believes is a remnant of when Mexiah's personality was dominant. When piloting her Sacred Mechanoid, she can easily defeat any opponent except for Kenshi. In the last episode, the merged Doll/Mexiah calls upon Kenshi through their shared bond of being artificial humans to save her from being subsumed by the merged Gaia/Babalan Sacred Mechalord. Doll's Sacred Mechanoid wields a scythe (which doubles as a gun) and later is armed with the retrieved Shield of Gaia (ガイアの盾を, Gaia no Tate), a massive and indestructible shield with a mouth capable of eating parts of her opponents. Her Sacred Mechanoid's black color implies that she may be the legendary "Sacred Mechamaster of Darkness" (闇の聖機士, Yami no Seikishi) destined to destroy the world and Kenshi's nemesis. As Mexiah, her Sacred Mechanoid is lavender with a pink lion's mane armed with a launcher.

Doll bears a close resemblance to the character Neju Na Melmas from Tenchi Muyo! GXP and the character D from Dual! Parallel Trouble Adventure in terms of appearance and hair color . The child-form Doll also has pink eyes. As Mexiah, her hair and eye color are reversed.

Dagmyer Mesut (ダグマイア・メスト, Dagumaia Mesuto)
Voiced by: Takuya Sato (Japanese); Duncan Brannan (English)
The hot-blooded and hot-tempered son of Babalun, Chiaia's childhood friend, and a student of Holy Land Academy. He manipulated Kenshi into attempting to assassinate Lashara in the first episode, and is also responsible for recruiting some of the Academy's male students for the invasion of the Holy Land. His Sacred Mechanoid is blue and gold with a sword that can fire energy blasts from the tip and hilt and a shield as its weapons. His primary motive in betraying and attacking the Holy Land seems to stem from the unfair conditions faced by male Sacred Mechamasters, due to the fact that male Sacred Mechamasters, are given less freedom than female Sacred Mechamasters; he therefore recruits to his cause other male Mechamasters who feel as he does. His attitude is demonstrated by his refusal to accept help or sound advice from Emera, his cavalier treatment of Cordyline, his manipulation of Chiaia to get her to kill Kenshi and his rough treatment of her after her failed attempt. In episode 11, he becomes traumatized after nearly being killed by Kenshi's Sacred Mechanoid in berserker mode and seeing Cliff Cleese hurled to his death in the process, but gradually recovers in the following episode. In the final episode, he finally acknowledges Kenshi's skill after he loses to him in a duel. At the end of the story, it's hinted that he's become infected by Babalun's core jewel.

Cliff Cleese (クリフ・クリーズ, Kurifu Kurīzu)
Voiced by: Kenji Takahashi (Japanese); Jerry Jewell (English)
He is the first male Sacred Mechamaster at Holy Land Academy to be wooed over to Babalun's cause by Dagmyer. It is not sure just how talented he is, but he clearly lacks battle experience since like the other male turncoats he is very arrogant when he thinks he has the upper hand but terrified and unable to fight back powerfully when facing a superior opponent. His Sacred Mechanoid is green and pink and does not seem to have any special weaponry. Acting on information from his uncle, Cliff originates the plan to force Ceres to kill Kenshi. Kenshi goes into berserker mode on learning that his friend was tormented into doing this and tears Cliff's Sacred Mechanoid apart, finally hurling him down a chasm. Cliff's last words before he falls to his death are "It wasn't supposed to be like this!"

Alan (アラン, Aran) and Neil (ニール, Nīru)
Alan Voiced by: Takayuki Sasada (Japanese); Joel McDonald (English)
Neil Voiced by: Hiroshi Miyazaki (Japanese); Ian Sinclair (English)
These two male Sacred Mechamasters are recruited by Dagmyer and act as his lieutenants. Although possibly strong fighters, they are easily defeated by Kenshi, and later when Lan takes charge after Dagmyer's collapse and female ronin are recruited into the Babalun forces, they are pushed to the rear by the same apparent lack of respect towards male Mechamasters that they were supposed to be fighting against. In the final battle between the Holy Land students led by Lithia and the Babalun ronin forces, they deliberately choose not to fight and are taken into custody after the battle.

Ulyte Mesut (ユライト・メスト, Yuraito Mesuto)
Voiced by: Tatsuhisa Suzuki (Japanese); J. Michael Tatum (English)
Ulyte is Babalun's younger brother, and one of the most popular instructors within the Academy; he seems to have a different intent for invading the Holy Land than his older brother. His personality is extremely friendly and easy-going, even a little hedonistic, which serves to conceal a keen and penetrating intelligence. It is later revealed that he is an entity created by one of the Core Crystals, which later created the alternate being/personality of Rea Second. This duality is hinted at being the cause of his physical weakness, which is partially cured by Kenshi's herbal tea.

Babalun Mesut (ババルン・メスト, Babarun Mesuto)
Voiced by: Hiroki Yasumoto (Japanese); R Bruce Elliott (English)
The chancellor (later Prime Minister) of the Shtrayu empire and the main antagonist of the series. He is the one who planned the invasion of the Holy Land so he could obtain the Sacred Mechalord Gaia and the Shield of Gaia within. It is later learned by the Church that Babalun wants not only Shtrayu and the Holy Land, but Havoniwa, Shurifon, and possibly the entire world of Geminar to himself. He later merged with Gaia to defeat Kenshi, only to meet his destruction at the hands of Kenshi and Ulyte, where it was later revealed that he is actually an entity created from the implantation of one of the Core Crystals; a fragment of his Core Crystal was soon picked up by Dagmyer following his defeat. His personal war vessel is called the Babel (バベル, Baberu), named and modeled after the Tower of Babel with an array of cannons equipped on its hull.

Cordyline (コルディネ, Korudine) and Lan (ラン, Ran)
Cordyline Voiced by: Akina Abe (Japanese); Stephanie Young (English)
Lan Voiced by: Rie Kugimiya (Japanese); Brina Palencia (English)
The mother/daughter leaders of a group of bandits. Cordyline is a 38-year-old ronin Sacred Mechamaster who went rogue because of her short operational limits when piloting a Sacred Mechanoid; her Sacred Mechanoid is purple with lavender pauldrons and gauntlets and her weapon is a pole-axe that can also fire fiery signal flares. Her daughter Lan is a sarcastic and rebellious teenager who takes her job seriously and views both Emera and Doll with contempt; she is also extremely ambitious and the most ruthless of all the antagonists. Originally planning to kidnap Ceres and Dagmyer in Havoniwa, they and the rest of the bandits were later recruited by Dagmyer to participate in the invasion of the Holy Land, Cordyline becoming Dagmyer's lover. Cordyline piloted a purple Sacred Mechanoid that was eventually crushed by Kenshi and was later killed when the Meteor Fall in Havoniwa (which she and her crew had hijacked) collapsed and crashed after Kenshi took down one of its supports, leaving her daughter to take command. Lan has an enormous ego, demonstrated by showing growing contempt for Dagmyer, taking control of the ronin forces after he suffers his emotional collapse and continually believing that she and her bandits will triumph even in the face of her continual defeats at the hands of Kenshi and his comrades. After her total defeat at the checkpoint in the final battle, she is seen at the end of the series going after Dagmyer, attempting to kill him in order to re-establish her reputation, only to meet her end by Emera.

Emera (エメラ)
Voiced by: Hyo-sei (Japanese); Shelley Calene-Black (English)
Dagmyer's servant and a Sacred Mechamaster. She has feelings for Dagmyer (who does not reciprocate) and appears to be far more skilled than him; she manages to save him from some falling rubble while Kenshi is escaping from Wahanly, Lithia, Aura, Chiaia, Maria, and Yukine, and again from near-death during Kenshi's rampage in his Sacred Mechanoid. She shows concern for Dagmyer and his honor as the show progresses; her own sense of honor is far more evident than his when she voices her concerns about his hiring Lan and the other bandits, Lan's continuing and growing reckless behavior and the dishonorable methods Dagmyer uses against Kenshi. She regards Kenshi as someone who is kind and is grateful to him for helping Dagmyer change his ways at the end. At the end of the final episode, she kills Lan who is attempting to kill Dagmyer. Her Sacred Mechanoid is red and pink and equipped with a gunblade.

=== Others ===
Mahya (マーヤ, Māya), Angela (アンジェラ, Anjera), and Vanessa (ヴァネッサ)
Mahya Voiced by: Eri Taruta (Japanese); Pam Dougherty (English)
Angela Voiced by: Ayano Ishikawa (Japanese); Leah Clark (English)
Vanessa Voiced by: Aki Unone (Japanese); Brittney Karbowski (English)
Lashara's attendants, with Mahya being the oldest and most mature of the three; Mahya also acts as a personal and trusted councilor to Lashara. When Kenshi accepts the role of Lashara's attendant, Mahya's intuition tells her that this has been an historical moment. Angela and Vanessa may have a crush on Kenshi, as they both admit that he's cute. They also serve as part of the Swan's crew.

Koro (コロ)
Two-tailed, Cabbit-like creatures that also double as security alarms due to their piercing meows. For some strange reason, they appear to be attracted to Kenshi (in episode 4, they are also attracted to the crystal from Ryo-Ohki's ship when Ulyte analyzed it); Kenshi is many times during the series compared to, and even called (by Chiaia mostly), a koro.

Rea Second (レイア・セカンド, Reia Sekando) / Neizai One (ネイザイ・ワン, Neizai Wan)
Voiced by: Akina Abe (Rea), Ayumi Tsunematsu (Neizai) (Japanese); Martha Harms (English)
A member of the Church whose alter ego is Neizai One, a mysterious masked woman working under Ulyte's orders with an unknown agenda. As Rea, she briefly joined Lashara's group after the Head Church's headquarters was destroyed by Doll, but she later shows her true colors at the Barrier Workshop by stealing a mysterious object which Naua described as being the only way to destroy Gaia. Her Sacred Mechanoid is grey with a cape and a mask with active camouflage armed with a large sniper rifle. She shares the same civilian name as Kenshi's mother, also named Rea.

Flora Nanadan (フローラ・ナナダン, Furōra Nanadan)
Voiced by: Miyu Matsuki (Japanese); Colleen Clinkenbeard (English)
The Queen of Havoniwa. While she may appear polite and modest at first glance, she is in reality a hedonistic woman. This causes Maria and Lashara to be frequently embarrassed by her antics (and is one of the few points in which they are entirely in agreement with each other and work together). Following an erotic massage, Flora developed a huge crush on Kenshi. Flora is also shown to be a great pilot when she tested Wahanly's Mechaworker in the forest. She later defends the Holy Land in the invasion plotted by Babalun, with a train equipped with two cannons in each car and a giant cannon hidden in the engine. She had no idea that Kenshi was a Sacred Mechamaster, but when she found out this only increased her passion for him.

Naua Flan (ナウア・フラン, Naua Furan)
Voiced by: Kenji Takahashi (Japanese); Christopher Sabat (English)
Naua is Chiaia's father and a leading member of the Barrier Workshop. He was the one who found the Sacred Mechalord and Doll in the ruins of what once was a highly advanced civilization prior to Chiaia's birth. Upon finding Doll in the ruins, he adopted her as Mexiah, who would later be Chiaia's adoptive sister. When Kenshi and the rest of the Swan's crew finally arrive, he reveals the history of the Senshi Civilization, the Sacred Mechalord Gaia, and how Doll came into being. The tests on Kenshi by his team prove that Kenshi is somehow connected to the third artificial human.

King Shurifon (シュリフォン王, Shurifon Ō)
Voiced by: Kenji Takahashi (Japanese); John Swasey (English)
Aura's father and the ruler of the Shurifon Kingdom, as well as the kingdom's strongest Sacred Mechamaster. He challenges Kenshi to race to see if he is truly capable of leading his men to battle; after he loses to Kenshi's ability, he announced his intention for Kenshi to marry Aura, to her delight. Later, when the King and Flora come on the Swan, they teasingly suggest that Kenshi marry both Aura and Flora in an effort to unite the three kingdoms.

Pope (教皇, Kyōkō)
Voiced by: Shingo Saitō (Japanese); Jerry Russell (English)
The leader of the Church and Lithia's grandfather, with his first name being Gen. He is a very understanding and kind person who tries to find the best solution which does not lead to war. He has shown great respect for Kenshi not only as a Sacred Mechamaster of Light but also as the man who looked after his granddaughter when she collapsed and as the unifyer of all the Holy Land students. It is hinted that he knows Lithia has feelings for Kenshi.

Elder
Voiced by: Kenji Takahashi
The leader of Yukine's home village in Havoniwa. He is extremely devoted to tradition and it takes drastic measures to cause him to change his mind.

== Terminology ==
=== General ===
Aho (亜法, Ahō)
Aho is a form of energy that permeates the air of Geminar and used to power the Sacred Mechanoid.

Sea of Ena (エナの海, Ena no Umi)
Seas of Ena are low-altitude areas where the Aho is so thick that allows flying ships to transit there.

Sacred Mechamaster (聖機師, Seikishi)
Sacred Mechamasters are the guardians of the Holy Land and the only people qualified to pilot Sacred Mechanoids. Most of the Sacred Mechamasters are female, though there are some male Sacred Mechamasters (such as Dagmyer and Ceres) and they're considered rare in numbers. Female Sacred Mechamasters have the freedom of marriage and relationships if they fulfill their duties, which is to produce more Sacred Mechamaster breeds. Male Sacred Mechamasters, however, cannot due to their scarcity and are usually forced to engage in marriages of convenience, and in ancient times, the semen of a male Sacred Mechamaster was a high-priced item. A Sacred Mechamaster who can repair Sacred Mechanoids using Aho (like Mexiah, for example) is called a Sacred Mechaguardian (聖衛士, Seieishi). To obtain this ability, a Sacred Mechamaster has to be baptized by the Church. Unemployed Sacred Mechamasters, like Cordyline, are called ronin Sacred Mechamasters. Some female Sacred Mechamasters wear unique tight-fitting (and sometimes revealing) bodysuits underneath their clothing that protects them from the Aho emitted in the Sacred Mechamasters' cockpit and the Moving Armor.

The main factor that distinguishes a Sacred Mechamaster from a regular human is their ability to endure proximity to Aho energy, which is used to power the Sacred Mechanoid. Ulyte explains that, while fighting skill can be enhanced through training, a Sacred Mechamasters' level of endurance is something they are born with, and therefore cannot be changed. Sacred Mechamasters are limited by the amount of time they can endure an Aho field, called the operational limit. Sacred Mechamasters cannot pilot a Sacred Mechanoid for longer than their operational limit.

Sacred Mechalord (聖機神, Seikishin)
Ancient and powerful humanoid constructs that were built by an ancient race called the Senshi. Gaia (ガイア), the only surviving Sacred Mechalord, was unearthed intact (although immobile) by the Shtrayu Empire, and was mainly used as a decoration before the arrival of Kenshi triggered a response from it. It was revealed that the Senshi civilization was completely destroyed by Gaia.

Sacred Mechanoid (聖機人, Seikijin)
Humanoid mecha that are powered by an energy source called Aho. They usually reside in egg-like cocoons until they're activated. To enter a Sacred Mechanoid, a Sacred Mechamaster places their palm on the cocoon. After the palm is read, the Sacred Mechamaster is then encased in a sphere as they travel to the chest cavity. As soon as a pilot in the cockpit activates it, the Sacred Mechanoid breaks from the cocoon, which then forms the armor (and tail if the Sacred Mechamaster is powerful) depending on who is in the Sacred Mechanoid. Normal people cannot be taken inside the cockpit due to the high amount of Aho radiated inside.

A weakness for Sacred Mechanoids is due to their human anatomy, they are vulnerable to pressure points, which was demonstrated when Kenshi paralyzed Cordyline's Sacred Mechanoid using one of Wahanly's Mechaworker. Another weakness is that if the pilot passes their operational limits or if one of the energy reactors (the rings on a Sacred Mechanoid's back and forearms) either break or go out of control, the Sacred Mechanoid will then revert to its cocoon form. According to Aura, Sacred Mechanoids are a cost-effective alternative to raising armies or building heavy artillery to defend their homelands. To repair a damaged Sacred Mechanoid using Aho, a Sacred Mechamaster has to undergo being baptized by the Church in order to repair them. Otherwise, the damaged Sacred Mechanoid has to be sent to the Church directly for repairs. To maintain the balance of power in each country, the Church can only supply a certain number of Sacred Mechanoids to each country to prevent further power struggles.

Moving Armor (動甲冑, Dōkatchū)
Suits of Aho-powered armor that Sacred Mechamasters-in-training use to train. When it is hit, the site of impact turns red and it affects the armor's movement based on the damage received. They are later modified by Wahanly to run on steam power for a limited time (only 30 minutes) should the cord supplying the Aho be removed.

Mechaworker (機工人, Kikkōjin)
Four-legged mechanoids resembling Uchikomas that are powered by steam instead of Aho. Invented by Wahanly, Mechaworkers provide much greater maneuverability than what a Sacred Mechanoid provides and can be equipped with various gunpowder weapons, though it will hamper its high maneuverability. It is also proven to be more efficient than Sacred Mechanoids without Ena's Draft. In episode 12, Lan and her group of bandits are seen with grey Mechaworkers attacking Chiaia and Aura while Kenshi is compressing the rock used to form the Tenchi-ken, most likely based on the plans Emera stole from Wahanly's workshop in episode 4.

=== Locations and Organizations ===
Shtrayu Empire (シトレイユ皇国, Shitoreiyu-kōkoku)
The home country of Lashara and Chiaia prior to moving to the Holy Land. Shtrayu lacks some technological advances, as quoted by Maria, so it relies on using the technologies of other countries such as Havoniwa. It is also the place where the Sacred Mechalord and Doll were unearthed. Shtrayu's past ruler, Lashara's father, died prior to the series, leaving Lashara to become his successor. However, Lashara slowly loses her position of power to Babalun after his promotion to Prime Minister.

Holy Land (聖地, Seichi)
An impregnable fortress made in the image of the Choushin goddess. It is also home to Holy Land Academy (聖地学院, Seichi-gaku), a special school where nobles and the wealthy train to become Sacred Mechamasters. The Holy Land also holds the Sacred Tournament (聖武会, Seibukai), a tournament where Sacred Mechamasters from all over Geminar compete (Aura once stated that Flora was one of the champions). In the Holy Arena, pillars and Ena's Draft are placed as challenging obstacles for the most skilled Sacred Mechamasters, though Kenshi is able to maneuver through them with ease. According to Lashara, winning the Holy Tournament is the greatest achievement for a Sacred Mechamaster. It was later invaded and conquered by Babalun, who was after the Shield of Gaia that was buried underneath and Gaia itself, but was later reconquered following Babalun's defeat.

Havoniwa (ハヴォニワ国, Havoniwa-koku)
The homeland of Flora, Maria, and Yukine, and one of the more technologically advanced countries in comparison to the others. In Havoniwa, there is a welcome ceremony in the form of a pillow fight, where the competitors are to pull the sashes off of their opponents' yukata and the last person standing wins. Their main defense is the Meteor Fall (メテオフォール, Meteo Fōru) a floating fortress that drops meteor-sized rocks to destroy their invaders. It is stated in the anime that the main city that was destroyed by Dagmyer's forces was actually its governing area and there was little to no residents in the area so it was a small loss to Havoniwa. It also has an underground city in case their main city is destroyed. Havoniwa's capital was destroyed by Doll, but its people managed to find refuge in the underground city.

Shurifon Kingdom (シュリフォン王国, Shurifon-Ōkoku)
The nature-affiliated home of the Dark Elves (ダークエルフ, Dāku Erufu), who have dark skin, silvery-white hair, and blue eyes much like Aura's. Also like Aura, their personalities shift based on the time of day, which is described by others as their "weak periods" (負の時間, Fu no Jikan). In Shurifon, there is a rare mushroom that can be sold for a huge fortune (Kenshi found four during the series' run), and it is often used as a gourmet ingredient in the royal courts. Also in Shurifon, there is an event called the Stew Battle, where the contestants find ingredients from the forest to make a stew. The winner is determined by a judge and the person with the most delicious stew wins. Shurifon was the first of the countries to be destroyed by Dagmyer's forces. It is later revealed by Naua that Shurifon's people were brought to Geminar by the Senshi Civilization in ancient times to pilot the Sacred Mechalord, and their weak periods are actually side effects of trying to adapt to the new world.

Church (教会, Kyōkai)
The main overseers of Geminar. They are the remnants of the Senshi civilization and are well-aware of the dangers of Sacred Mechanoids. They tried to prevent the introduction of Sacred Mechanoids into the current world but had no choice once the Sacred Mechalord was unearthed in the Shtrayu Empire. To prevent the occurrence of an arms race of the kind that destroyed the Senshi civilization, the Church decided to allot a fixed number of Sacred Mechanoids and Sacred Mechamasters to each country to maintain a balance. The Church was shown to have superior technology, such as teleportation pads, apart from monopolizing the construction and repair of Sacred Mechanoids.

Highlands (高地, Kōchi)
An area outside of the Draft of Ena where Sacred Mechanoids and other devices powered by Aho no longer function. It is far less advanced than most of the countries that use the Draft of Ena, and it is said that the people living there are isolated socially as well as physically.

Senshi (戦士)
An ancient civilization on the world of Geminar. The Senshi civilization was world-wide and unified, with individual units such as cities and villages. Naua Flan explains that the Senshi civilization created the Sacred Mechanoids, not for war, but for sports and other athletic competitions. Eventually, the Sacred Mechanoids were used for gladiator-like fight events, and the Sacred Mechamasters became an elite class. Massive technological advancements were made to the Sacred Mechanoids as people tried to one-up their opponents. As the battles between Sacred Mechanoids grew more fierce and the number of Sacred Mechamaster fatalities increased, the expertise and fighting instincts of the Sacred Mechamasters were downloaded onto crystals (called Core Crystals (コアクリスタル, Koa Kurisutaru)) and embedded into newer Sacred Mechamasters to preserve them. Over time, the accumulation of fighting skills and bloodlust in the crystals caused the Sacred Mechanoids to go on a rampage. These rampaging Sacred Mechanoids were labelled as Sacred Mechalord because of their overwhelming power. The human remnants managed to disable the Sacred Mechalord, but were too late to save their civilization, which had split into several groups as the people fled the Sacred Mechalord.

== Media ==
=== Anime ===
Isekai no Seikishi Monogatari was produced by AIC and BeSTACK under the directorship of Koji Yoshikawa, with the script written by Hideki Shirane, characters by Hajime Watanabe, music by Akifumi Tada, and produced by Shoji Ohta, Yasuo Ueda, and Yoshiyuki Matsuzaki, respectively. Thirteen episodes aired in Japan between March 20, 2009, and March 19, 2010, on Japan's Pay-Per-View television channel Animax. The episodes were later released on DVD and Blu-ray by VAP between May 22, 2009, and May 26, 2010. A Blu-ray box set was later released on May 18, 2011. At Otakon 2012, North American distributor Funimation Entertainment announced they have licensed the series under the title of Tenchi Muyo! War on Geminar.

The opening theme for the series is "Follow Me" by Japanese-Canadian pop singer Seira Kagami featuring Sound Around, while the ending theme is "Destino" (Italian for "Destiny") by Alchemy+. A maxi single for the opening theme was released by VAP on January 14, 2010.

=== Light novel ===
A light novel adaptation of the series written by Atsushi Wada and illustrated by Katsumi Enami was released on August 20, 2009, by Fujimi Shobo under their Fujimi Fantasia Bunko imprint.

=== Manga ===
A manga adaptation illustrated by Bau was serialized on the June 2009 issue of Comic REX. Two volumes were released on June 9, 2010, by Ichijinsha. The manga follows a slightly different storyline from the anime, though its plot remains the same.
