= Tenchi Muyo! Ryo-Ohki =

Japanese OVA collection

- Blu-ray collection cover depicting Tenchi and Ryoko

天地無用! 魎皇鬼 (Tenchi Muyō! Ryōōki)
- Created by: Masaki Kajishima; AIC
- Original video animation
- Directed by: Hiroki Hayashi
- Produced by: Yasuo Hasegawa; Hiroaki Inoue; Izumi Oota; Taiji Yamashita; Kazuaki Morijiri; Hisao Yamada
- Written by: Naoko Hasegawa
- Music by: Seikou Nagaoka
- Studio: AIC
- Licensed by: AUS: Madman Entertainment; NA: Geneon Entertainment (former) Crunchyroll (current); UK: MVM Films; US: Cartoon Network (Toonami)
- Released: September 25, 1992 – September 25, 1993
- Runtime: 30 minutes
- Episodes: 7
- Original video animation

Tenchi Muyo! Mihoshi Special
- Directed by: Kazuhiro Ozawa
- Produced by: Kazuaki Morijiri; Hiroaki Inoue; Yasuo Hasegawa
- Written by: Ryoe Tsukimura
- Music by: Seikou Nagaoka
- Studio: AIC
- Licensed by: US: Pioneer (expired in 2003)
- Released: March 25, 1994
- Original video animation

Tenchi Muyo! Ryo-Ohki 2
- Directed by: Kenichi Yatagai
- Produced by: Yasuo Hasegawa; Hiroaki Inoue; Kazuaki Morijiri
- Written by: Yōsuke Kuroda
- Music by: Seikou Nagaoka
- Studio: AIC
- Licensed by: AUS: Madman Entertainment; NA: Geneon Entertainment (former) Crunchyroll (current); UK: MVM Films; US: Cartoon Network (Toonami)
- Released: September 25, 1994 – September 25, 1995
- Runtime: 30 minutes
- Episodes: 6
- Original video animation

Tenchi Muyo! Ryo-Ohki 3
- Directed by: Kenichi Yatagai
- Produced by: Hiroaki Inoue; Yasuo Ueda; Yutaka Oohashi; Hiroshi Yamashita; Hiroyuki Ueno; Toshio Nakatani; Yukiko Kimishima
- Written by: Yōsuke Kuroda
- Music by: Akifumi Tada
- Studio: AIC
- Licensed by: AUS: Madman Entertainment; NA: Crunchyroll; UK: MVM Films
- Released: September 18, 2003 – September 14, 2005
- Runtime: 30 minutes
- Episodes: 7
- Original video animation

Tenchi Muyo! Ryo-Ohki 4
- Directed by: Masaki Kajishima (Note: Chief Director (総監督)); Hidetoshi Takahashi
- Produced by: Masayoshi Matsumoto; Yasuyuki Nishiya; Tsuyoshi Hosono; Zhong Yong; Ge Yangqian
- Written by: Hideki Shirane
- Music by: Ryou Sakai; Crunch All Stars
- Studio: AIC; C2C (Note: C2C and A-Line are only credited for Animation Production Assistance (アニメーション制作協力); however, AIC's animation studio shut down around 2015 according to former AIC animator Atsushi Okuda, and as of the production of Ryo-Ohki 4 and Ryo-Ohki 5 still did not have a animation house, which indicates that C2C and A-Line were the show's animation studio despite the lesser credit.)
- Licensed by: AUS: Madman Entertainment; NA: Crunchyroll (streaming rights outside Asia); UK: MVM Films; SA/SEA: Muse Communication
- Released: November 30, 2016 – September 13, 2017
- Runtime: 30 minutes
- Episodes: 4
- Original video animation

Tenchi Muyo! Ryo-Ohki 5
- Directed by: Masaki Kajishima; Keitarou Motonaga
- Produced by: Masayoshi Matsumoto; Hiroshi Kawamura; Takafumi Takemura; Fumito Sakuma
- Written by: Hideki Shirane
- Music by: Strikers: Eiichirou Yanag; Kyōuhei Nishizaka; Gaku Minato; Takaoki Yamada; Toshinori Orikura
- Studio: AIC; A-Line
- Licensed by: AUS: Madman Entertainment; NA: Crunchyroll (streaming rights outside Asia); UK: MVM Films; SA/SEA: Muse Communication
- Released: February 28, 2020 – May 28, 2021
- Runtime: 30 minutes
- Episodes: 6
- Related series
- 1. Tenchi Muyo! GXP; 2. Tenchi Muyo! War on Geminar; 3. Tenchi Universe; 4. Tenchi in Tokyo; 5. Ai Tenchi Muyo!

Tenchi Muyo! Ryo-Ohki (天地無用! 魎皇鬼, Tenchi Muyō! Ryōōki), known as simply Tenchi Muyo! in North America, is a collection of Japanese OVAs created by Masaki Kajishima and animated by AIC. Initially released in 1992, it marked the beginning of the Tenchi Muyo! franchise, composed of several manga, OVAs, TV series, and other related media. The first two OVA series were later licensed and distributed in North America by Pioneer Entertainment, with Funimation taking over the rights for the third series, and later taking over the rights for the first two OVAs. In 2020, Crunchyroll acquired worldwide streaming rights (outside Asia) for the fourth and fifth seasons of the OVA.

Distribution of the first OVA series began in September 1992, releasing six episodes until 1993. The first series was so successful that a seventh special episode was released in September 1993, followed by a second OVA series with six additional episodes that began distribution from September 1994 until September 1995. The second OVA series ended on a cliffhanger, and a third OVA series was distributed in Japan in 2003. The third OVA series continued the Tenchi Muyo OVA storyline with six episodes, followed by a special episode released in September 2005 that concludes the third OVA storyline.

The Ultimate Collection box set release of the first two OVAs from Geneon is one of the few releases from the company to feature THX-certified audio and video.

On October 16, 2015, a fourth OVA series was announced to be in production, the first episode of which was released on November 30, 2016. Subsequent episodes were released with an interval of three months each, and the final part of the series arrived on September 13, 2017. On July 12, 2019, it was announced that a fifth OVA series was in development with Masaki Kajishima again serving as chief director and Hideki Shirane writing and overseeing scripts. Keitaro Motonaga is credited as director. The six-episode OVA series was released from February 28, 2020, to May 28, 2021.

== Plot summary ==
The story follows Tenchi Masaki, a teenager whose life changes drastically as soon as he releases an ancient space pirate from 700 years ago named Ryoko Hakubi. Although she appears openly hostile to him at first, Ryoko nonetheless agrees to accompany Tenchi. Throughout the series, Tenchi encounters various other powerful and recurrently eccentric women from outer space.

== Characters ==
=== Protagonists ===
- Tenchi Masaki is a teenager who accidentally releases the space pirate Ryoko. His actions unintentionally cause the destruction of his school and the revelation that he is part-Juraian and a member of their royal family. In the 1st OVA it is revealed that he can create Light Hawk Wings (the power of the goddesses and Jurai ships) without the aid of a royal tree, and can also perform energy-matter conversion.
- Ryoko Hakubi is a creation of the scientist Washu Hakubi (of her own egg and a substance called Masu), Ryoko was a space pirate in the service of Kagato until she was sealed in a cave for 700 years; she is released by Tenchi in the first episode. She draws most of her powers from three mysterious gems and is partnered with the cabbit spaceship Ryo-Ohki.
- Ryo-Ohki, the title character, appears as a grey-colored cabbit (a cross between a cat and rabbit) and can transform into a spaceship.
- Ayeka Masaki Jurai, is a princess of the Juraian Royal Family. She is searching the galaxy for her half-brother and future betrothed Yosho with her sister Sasami when she detects Ryoko (whom Yosho had been pursuing prior to his disappearance) her tree-ship Ryu-Oh crashes on Earth, where she reluctantly joins Tenchi and Ryoko.
- Sasami Masaki Jurai is Ayeka's younger sister and a princess of the Juraian Royal Family. She stows away on Ayeka's ship prior to the search for Yosho. She has merged with the Goddess Tsunami, which grants the Jurai family its royal trees. Sasami frequently cooks for the household.
- Mihoshi Kuramitsu, a member of the powerful Kuramitsu family of the Seniwa empire and a Detective of the Galaxy Police, is prone to clumsiness and can act ditzy, despite being highly intelligent. Mihoshi is distantly related to Washu, and through that lineage has the power of improbably good luck. She crashes on Earth while looking for Kagato.
- Washu Hakubi is a former Director of the Galaxy Academy and ranked as the top scientist in the universe. Washu's more recent pursuits involve investigating the three gems (the ones Ryoko were given) and creating lifeforms capable of harnessing their power (of which the Ryoko/Ryo-Ohki combination is one). She was trapped by Kagato and later released by Mihoshi. It is revealed in OVA 3 that Washu is a human manifestation of a sister-goddess to Tsunami and Tokimi.
- Noike Kamiki Jurai was raised in an orphanage and later joined the Galaxy Police. She was Mihoshi's partner and was adopted by Seto Kamiki Jurai, Ayeka and Sasami's grandmother, and is introduced as Tenchi's fiancée in OVA 3. The engagement, however, is a political pretense to allow her to monitor the powerful members of the household.

=== Villains and antagonists ===
- Kagato is a former student of Washu (revealed in spin-off media as a creation of hers). In the pursuit of science, he frequently pillages ruins for relics with no regard to life or property, earning him the nickname 'Ruins Buster' and status of Eternally Wanted by the Galaxy Police. Kagato is the main antagonist of the 1st OVA making an attempt to recover Ryoko (whom he previously brainwashed into serving him) and use the power of her gems to capture Tsunami.
- Doctor Clay, a former colleague and academic rival of Washu from the Galaxy Academy, is in service to Lady Tokimi in OVA 2 (in which he is the primary adversary) and is ordered by her to capture Washu and bring her to Tokimi. Clay uses the shape-shifting android Zero to replace Ryoko and capture Washu. However he is outsmarted by Washu, captured and handed over to the Galaxy Police.
- Tokimi (訪希深) is a mysterious hyperdimensional being (stated to be beyond all dimensional space) who is one of the "Choushin", the greatest "goddesses" in existence. Her sisters are Tsunami and Washu. Introduced in the second OVA series, where she orders Dr. Clay to bring Washu to her. Tokimi is not portrayed as an antagonist in the 3rd OVA, since she considers Tenchi as the result of their research to find a being even more powerful than herself, theorising that it might have created the Choushin themselves. While Tsunami and Washu were experimenting within the lower universes to try to discover an even higher level being, Tokimi was left in-charge of all 22-dimensional reality and controls it from the Hyper-dimension through higher-dimensional supervisors to conduct higher order chaos experiments. Though Tokimi's actions lead to trouble for Tenchi and his group, Tokimi turns out not to be a true villain as there was no malice in her actions but simply lacked the wisdom of her sisters. Tokimi now currently lives with the Tenchi family, as a smaller form, Toki-Chan. Voiced by: Yumi Tōma (Japanese); Jennifer Darling (OVA 2), Mari Devon (OVA 3) (English)
- Z (ゼット, Zetto) (full name Z-0001332536893) is the principal antagonist of the third OVA series of Tenchi Muyo! Ryo-Ohki. An anomalous being of great power, capable of punching holes through planets seemingly without effort. He is capable of creating Lighthawk Wings created through the experiments of Lady Tokimi. Throughout the 3rd OVA, he stalks Tenchi and his household, setting up a confrontation between Tenchi and Misao Kuramitsu and ultimately battling Tenchi to prove his superiority and disrupt the choushin plans. Z is portrayed as suffering from the loss of his family and resentful of the Goddesses and their meddling, despite serving Tokimi. Voiced by: Eiji Hanawa (Japanese); Brad MacDonald (English)
- The Counter-Actor (反作用体, Hansayōtai) is an anomalous being created as the sum total sentient "counter-force" from the Choushin Goddesses' sum total experimentation on 22-dimensional reality, and somehow merging with queen Misaki of Jurai. It is capable of causing their lower-dimensional shadows physical injury (visually appearing to corrupt their body, turning them black). Z found her in the future and used her in his plans to kill Tenchi and stop Tokimi's experiments. The counter-actor is stopped and healed by a kiss from the ascended future Tenchi and is revealed to be Masaki Misaki Jurai (The 2nd Empress of Jurai and mother of Ayeka and Sasami) from some point in the future.

Background information released by the series creator indicates the Counter-Actor is from a point in the distant future (ten thousand years or more) when both her husband Azusa, and her co-wife Funaho have passed on, which caused Misaki to eventually go mad from her grief and destructive power. According to this information, during his time travel after being struck by Z's Light Hawk Wing, Tenchi was to encounter Misaki in her future time. Unfortunately, while planned, it was cut from the OVA.

=== Minor ===
For other characters within the OVA continuity that appear in the OVA series.

- Kazuhiko Amagasaki (尼ヶ崎 和彦, Amagasaki Kazuhiko) , Kamikura (かみくら) , and Ikeda (池田) are Tenchi's three classmates who make brief appearances: Kazuhiko Amagasaki appears in Episode 1 of OVA 1. Kamikura and Ikeda appear in the first episode of OVA 3. Amagasaki is a recurring character in Tenchi in Tokyo.
- Amagasaki (voiced by Toshiharu Sakurai (Japanese), Mark Tracy (English))
- Kamikura (voiced by Wataru Takagi (Japanese), Crispin Freeman (English))
- Ikeda (voiced by Yasuhiro Fujiwara (Japanese), Kirk Thornton (English))
- Galaxy Police Commander (voiced by Hiroshi Masuoka (Japanese), Dan Butler (English ep. 4), Harry Johnson (English ep. 13)), a Wau by birth, answers directly to the Galaxy Police Marshal, Minami Kuramitsu. He appears in OVA 1, episode 4, then again in the final episode in OVA 2. His desk is covered with paperwork, mostly concerning Mihoshi.
- Captain Nobeyama (野辺山, Nobeyama) (voiced by Takurō Kitagawa (Japanese), Harry Johnson (English, credited as David Johnson in OVA 1)) is Mihoshi's immediate superior in the Galaxy Police. He is secretly a member of Jurai Intelligence and relayed Mihoshi's report on the Kagato Incident because it contains sensitive information about Jurai's royal trees.
- Yukinojo (雪之丞, Yukinojō) (voiced by Hideyuki Umezu (Japanese), Mark Tracy (English)) is Mihoshi's spacecraft, as well as the artificial intelligence that operates it.
- Akie Masaki (Onsen Keeper) (voiced by Hisako Kyōda (Japanese), Zita Campisi (English OVA 1), Kate T. Vogt (English OVA 2)) is Tenchi's great-aunt on his father's side (making her a descendant of Yosho through his first wife, Kasumi (a niece of his mother, the Empress Funaho, not to be mistaken with Tenchi's cousin, Kasumi (Baby Taro's mother), who was named for her)). Her name is revealed in OVA 4, where she is revealed to be a Masaki Clan Elder and Kei Masaki's elder sister (or an elder sister-figure to her, as Kei addresses her as 'big sister'), making her Kasumi Masaki's aunt and baby Taro Masaki's great-aunt. In episode 24, Akie and Kei, along with Washu, serve as midwives at Kenshi Masaki's birth.
- Taro (太老, Tarō) (voiced by Miki Narahashi (Japanese), Sherry Lynn (English)) is Tenchi's infant cousin who appears in the first episode of OVA 2. When his mother becomes ill, his grandmother, Tenchi's aunt, Kei Masaki, Tenchi's cousin Kasumi's mother (who's not to be mistaken with her ancestor, Yosho's first wife, Kasumi), sends Taro to live with Tenchi and the girls until his mother got better. Makes an appearance in the second episode of OVA 4.
- Mass or Masu are communal creatures allegedly discovered by Naja Akara, and what Washu used to create Ryoko and Ryo-Ohki. These creatures have anti-matter capabilities, and often pattern their thought patterns after the strongest mind they find.
- D3 (Di Surī) (voiced by Ryūzaburō Ōtomo (Japanese), Jack Fletcher (English OVA 2), Michael McConnohie (English OVA 3)) is a dimensional supervisor, specifically the supervisor of the 3rd dimension. He serves Lady Tokimi and the other Goddesses.
- Nakita Kuramitsu (九羅密 吟鍛, Kuramitsu Nakita) (voiced by Junichi Suwabe (Japanese), Kirk Thornton (English)) is the father of Mihoshi and Misao and a military officer that briefly appears at the end of episode 16.
- Mashisu Makibi (voiced by Keiko Onodera (Japanese), Lara Cody (English OVA 3), Kari Wahlgren (English GXP, credited as Renee Emerson)) is Misao Kuramitsu's assistant onboard the Choubimaru. Later, she becomes his wife.
- Kiyone Masaki (柾木 清音, Masaki Kiyone) (voiced by Yuri Amano (Japanese), Petrea Burchard (English OVA 1), Wendee Lee (English OVA 3)) (not to be confused with Kiyone Makibi) is the mother of Tenchi and Tennyo Masaki, as well as the younger sister of Minaho Masaki. Although she was a loving, kind person and an excellent cook (she had taught Rea Masaki how to cook), she inherited the playful spirit of her mother Airi Masaki, such as pulling pranks and doing things in an outlandish fashion; at the time of her death, Kiyone was 248 and suffering from senility. Prior to her death, Kiyone co-wrote a script for an outlandish explanation of her death for Tenchi when he comes of age, titled "Mom is so carefree!"
- Baguma (バグマ) , Fujimasa (藤正) , and Sorunāru (ソルナール) are the muscle that Mashisu Makibi has accompany her when she tries to have Ryoko Hakubi framed by destroying the Choubimaru. Baguma (voiced by Yoshinori Sonobe (Japanese), Dan Woren (English)) is the more muscular of them, and has telepathic abilities. Sorunāru (voiced by Katsuyuki Konishi (Japanese), Kim Strauss (English)) relies on spider-like battle-mechas, while Fujimasa (voiced by Hidenari Ugaki (Japanese), Sean Cw Johnson (English)) uses mechas resembling wolves.
- Mamah, Sasami's nursemaid who appears in episode 9 in OVA 2, is searching for Sasami during Ryoko's attack on Jurai.

== Broadcast history ==
The English-dubbed version of OVAs 1 and 2 was originally aired on San Jose PBS superstation, KTEH in the late 1990s as part of its Sunday Late-Prime (9pm-after 12) Sci-Fi programming block, and then later picked up by Cartoon Network in July 2000 for broadcast on its Toonami block (US and Europe). The Toonami version was heavily edited for content and to remove blood, profanity and nudity, as well as to shorten the length of the episodes to fit broadcast standards, and featured custom opening and closing credits. The series also ran on Cartoon Network and then later CNX in the UK.

After Cartoon Network's rights to broadcast the show expired, the now-defunct International Channel (later AZN Television) picked up the rights to air the dubbed version in 2004.

As of April 1, 2012, only one episode of OVA 3 has aired on basic cable television in the United States. However, the Funimation Channel had the third season in rotation for a time.

Muse Communication licensed the 4th and 5th series in Asia-Pacific and streamed it on Muse Asia YouTube channel.

== Tenchi Muyo! Mihoshi Special ==
Tenchi Muyo! Bangai-hen: Galaxy Police Mihoshi's Space Adventure or Mihoshi Special (天地無用!番外編 宇宙刑事美星銀河大冒険, Tenchi Muyō! Bangai-hen: Uchū Keiji Mihoshi Ginga Daibōken) is a special episode of the series.

The special features the anime debut of Kiyone Makibi and Sasami's alter-ego, Pretty Sammy (the latter made her debut in the Tenchi Muyo! drama CD, Tenchi Muyo! Special: Creation of the Universe Journey across Space-Time).

=== Synopsis ===
As usual, Mihoshi Kuramitsu was asleep on the deck of the house while everyone else (with the notable exception of Ryoko) was doing chores. After Ayeka questions Mihoshi's qualifications of being a Galaxy Policewoman, Mihoshi then tells the story of her and her partner Kiyone's greatest adventure: the "Ultra-Energy Matter" caper.

In the story, Mihoshi casts the Masaki household as the various characters in the story: Ryoko as the thief, Tenchi as a Galaxy Policeman, Ayeka as Tenchi's heiress fiancée, Sasami as an apprentice detective, Washu as a mad scientist (not a far stretch of the imagination), and Ryo-Ohki as Ryo-Ohki. As the investigation progresses (not to mention romantic rivalries between "Ryoko" and "Ayeka"), the detectives stumble onto a plot to destroy the universe.

== Music ==
- Background music was composed by Seikou Nagaoka for the first two series, Akifumi Tada for the third series, and Ryo Sakai for the fourth series.
- Opening 1 (episodes 1–6): "Tenchi Muyo! Ryo-Ohki's Theme" (天地無用!魎皇鬼のテーマ, Tenchi Muyō! Ryōōki no Tēmu)
  - Composed by Seikou Nagaoka
- Opening 2 (episodes 8–13): "Boku wa Motto Pioneer" (ぼくはもっとパイオニア, "I'm More of a Pioneer"), "I'm a Pioneer" for the English version
  - Performed by Chisa Yokoyama (Japanese version) and Sharyn Scott (English version)
- Opening 3 (episodes 14–18): "Tenchi Muyo! Ryo-Ohki Third Series Theme" (天地無用!魎皇鬼 第三期テーマ, Tenchi Muyō! Ryōōki Daisan-ki Tēmu)
  - Composed by Akifumi Tada
- Opening 4 (episodes 21): "Tenchi Muyo!" (天地無用!)
  - Performed by Serena Kozuki
- Opening 5 (episodes 22): "P.N.K!!"
  - Performed by Usagi Dash
- Opening 6 (episodes 23): "Kokoro Hanabira" (ココロハナビラ, "Heart Petals")
  - Performed by Haruna Oshima
- Opening 7 (episodes 24): "Brand New Door"
  - Performed by Ayuka Watanabe
- Ending 1 (episodes 1–7): "Ren'ai no Sainō" (恋愛の才能, "Talent for Love")
  - Performed by Chisa Yokoyama (Japanese version) and Sharyn Scott (English version)
- Ending 2 (episodes 8–13): "Tsuki no Tragedy" (月のTRAGEDY, "The Moon's Tragedy"), "The Lonely Moon" for the English version
  - Performed by Ai Orikasa (Japanese version) and Scottie Haskell (English version)
- Ending 3 (episodes 14–20): "Lovely Cookin'"
  - Performed by Tomoko Odajima
- Ending 4 (episodes 21): "Shake the Dice" (stylized as "Shake the DiCE")
  - Performed by Serena Kozuki
- Ending 5 (episodes 22): "Jumpin' Lovin' Girl"
  - Performed by +Earth☆Sky (featuring Ayaka Morikawa)
- Ending 6 (episodes 23): "Pastel Party♪" (パステルパーティー♪)
  - Performed by Aika Ito
- Ending 7 (episodes 24): "Koboreru Hizashi no Naka De" (こぼれる陽射しの中で, "Sunlight Pouring from Within")
  - Performed by Piyohina
- Ending 8 (episodes 25-30): "Gravitation=Love" (stylized as "Gravitation=LOVE")
  - Performed by Kaori Oda
- Insert Song (episode 8): "Washu no Komoriuta" (鷲羽の子守歌, "Washu's Lullaby")
  - Performed by Yuko Kobayashi (Japanese version) and Scottie Haskell (English version)

Mihoshi Special

- Background music was composed by Seikou Nagaoka.
- Opening: "Nemureru Engawa no Bijō" (眠れる縁側の美女, "Sleeping Beauty on the Balcony")
  - Performed by Yuko Mizutani and Etsuko Kozakura (Japanese version), and Ellen Gerstell (English version)
- Ending: "Mahō Shōjō Pretty Samy" (魔法少女プリティサミー, "Magical Girl Pretty Samy"), "Pretty Sammy, the Magical Girl" for the English version
  - Performed by Chisa Yokoyama (Japanese version) and Sherry Lynn (English version)
