= Tenchi Muyo! =

Japanese anime, light novel and manga franchise

- Japanese volume 1 cover for No Need for Tenchi! depicting Ryoko Hakubi and Ryo-Ohki

天地無用! (Tenchi Muyō!)
- Genre: Comedy, harem, space opera
- Original video animations
- Tenchi Muyo! Ryo-Ohki; Tenchi Muyo! Mihoshi Special
- Manga

No Need for Tenchi!
- Written by: Hitoshi Okuda
- Published by: Fujimi Shobo
- English publisher: NA: Viz Media; SG: Chuang Yi
- Magazine: Comic Dragon Junior
- Original run: December 16, 1994 – June 9, 2000
- Volumes: 12
- Manga

The All-New Tenchi Muyo!
- Written by: Hitoshi Okuda
- Published by: Fujimi Shobo
- Magazine: Comic Dragon Junior; Monthly Dragon Age
- Original run: July 26, 2000 – December 9, 2005
- Volumes: 10
- Anime television series
- Tenchi Universe; Tenchi in Tokyo; Tenchi Muyo! GXP; Ai Tenchi Muyo!
- Feature films
- Tenchi the Movie: Tenchi Muyo in Love; Tenchi the Movie 2: The Daughter of Darkness; Tenchi Forever! The Movie
- Related works
- Magical Girl Pretty Sammy (1995–1997); Magical Project S (1996–1997); Spaceship Agga Ruter (1998–1999); Dual! Parallel Trouble Adventure (1999); Sasami: Magical Girls Club (2006); Tenchi Muyo! War on Geminar (2009–2010)

Tenchi Muyo! (天地無用!, Tenchi Muyō!; lit. 'Do Not Turn Over" or "No Need for Tenchi') is a Japanese anime, light novel and manga franchise. The original series began with a six-episode OVA called Tenchi Muyo! Ryo-Ohki (天地無用! 魎皇鬼, Tenchi Muyō! Ryōōki). This original series was created by Masaki Kajishima and directed by Hiroki Hayashi, and it was released in Japan on September 25, 1992. The series was released by Pioneer LDC in the United Kingdom in 1994.

As its popularity grew, it spurred a seventh episode titled Tenchi Muyo! Special: The Night Before the Carnival (also known as the Tenchi Special) and a stand-alone Tenchi Muyo! Mihoshi Special. A second OVA series was directed by Kenichi Yatagai and was released in 1994. A third OVA series, which was also directed by Yatagai, was released in 2003. A fourth OVA series was produced in Japan, with the first collection released on November 30, 2016. The following episodes were planned to be released with an interval of three months each, and the final part of the series arrived August 30, 2017. On July 12, 2019, it was announced that a fifth OVA series is currently in development, with Masaki Kajishima again serving as chief director and Hideki Shirane writing and overseeing scripts.

A twenty-six-episode anime television series called Tenchi Universe (天地無用!, Tenchi Muyō!) was released in 1995, and it was focused on retelling and expanding upon the original six-episode story. Tenchi in Tokyo (新・天地無用!, Shin Tenchi Muyō!) was created in 1997, and it is another alternate version of the original story. The latest version of the series called Ai Tenchi Muyo!, was broadcast on Tokyo MX in 2014.

Spin-off series of Tenchi Muyo! were also created. Magical Girl Pretty Sammy is an example that was adapted into a manga series. The franchise has also spawned soundtrack CDs and other merchandise released both in Japan and in the United States.

== Concept ==
Masaki Kajishima and Hiroki Hayashi cite the Bubblegum Crisis OVAs, which they both worked on, as being the inspiration for Tenchi Muyo! Ryo-Ohki. In an interview with AIC, Hayashi described Bubblegum Crisis as "a pretty gloomy anime. Serious fighting, complicated human relationships and dark Mega Tokyo." They thought it would be fun to create some comedy episodes with ideas like the girls going to the hot springs, but it was rejected by the sponsors. He also said that there was a trend to have a bunch of characters of one gender and a single one of the other gender, and asked what if Mackey (Sylia's brother) was a main character, reversing the Bubblegum scenario. This became the basis for Tenchi Muyo!.

In designing Ryoko, Kajishima and Hayashi were inspired by the American sitcom I Dream of Jeannie and wanted to use her in their works. In the first episode, Tenchi would open the sealed cave, which was a reference to the Jeannie's bottle, and a "cute witch" would jump out. Hayashi said that Tenchi is "sort of" based on Mackey, and that after Tenchi and Ryoko, the other girls were designed to be characters to balance the picture in the very early concepts of the series, and that they are original characters.

== Media ==
=== OVA ===
The original Tenchi Muyo! Ryo-Ohki OVA series was created by Kajishima and Hayashi, though Hayashi departed after the completion of the first six-episode OVA series (1992-1993). Ryo-Ohki comprises five OVA series to date. The fifth OVA released its last episode on May 28, 2021.

=== Manga ===
Hitoshi Okuda wrote two manga series based on the OVA series. The first manga is titled No Need for Tenchi (天地無用!魎皇鬼, Tenchi Muyō! Ryo-Ohki) and was published by Kadokawa Shoten and serialized in Dragon Comic Jr. magazine from December 16, 1994, to June 9, 2000. The series was collected into 12 tankōbon volumes.

No Need for Tenchi was released in English in the United States by Viz Communications, and in Singapore by Chuang Yi.

The second series titled The All-New Tenchi Muyo! (新・天地無用! 魎皇鬼, Shin Tenchi Muyō! Ryo-Ohki; New Tenchi Muyo! Ryu-Ohki) was also published by Kadokawa Shoten and serialized in Dragon Comic Age magazine from July 26, 2000, to December 9, 2005. The series was collected into 10 tankōbon volumes.

=== TV series ===
After the first OVA series aired, AIC began looking into TV adaptations beyond the Mihoshi Special. In 1995 Tenchi Universe (天地無用!宇宙篇, Tenchi Muyō! Uchū Hen), a 26-episode anime television series was created by Hiroshi Negishi, animated by AIC and produced by Pioneer. It was loosely based on the first six episodes of the OVA series and the Mihoshi Special. Two years later, another AIC production followed suit called Tenchi in Tokyo (新・天地無用!, Shin Tenchi Muyō!; New Tenchi Muyo!), which aired through 1997 and also ran 26 episodes. It borrowed characters and some plot devices from the previous incarnations, but with a noticeable art shift and very different concepts, such as centering on Tenchi's high school and being a priest in Tokyo. The most recent series Ai Tenchi Muyo! (愛・天地無用!) aired in October 2014. The series commemorated the 20th anniversary of the franchise and was sponsored by the city of Takahashi, Okayama.

On July 9, 2026, a Kickstarter project was launched for Tenchi Galaxy, an anime pilot which was billed as the spiritual sequel to Tenchi Universe. The project reached its funding goal of $400,000 in less than 48 hours.

=== Films ===
An anime film titled Tenchi the Movie: Tenchi Muyo in Love, created by Hiroshi Negishi, is a continuation of the Tenchi Universe TV series. A second film, Tenchi the Movie 2: The Daughter of Darkness, was adapted from a novel written by Naoko Hasegawa. The third film, titled Tenchi Forever! The Movie, is the sequel to Tenchi Muyo in Love and was adapted into a manga titled Tenchi Muyo! In Love 2: Eternal Memory.

=== Novels ===
Kajishima has written several books based on the franchise, including the ongoing Tenchi Muyo! GXP: Galaxy Police Transporter novel series, the novels Shin Tenchi Muyo! Jurai, Shin Tenchi Muyo! Yosho, and Shin Tenchi Muyo! Washu, and recently, the Paradise Wars spinoff. There are also a number of dōjinshi by and interviews with Kajishima, as well as a companion book, 101 Questions and Answers of Tenchi Muyo! Ryo-Oh-Ki. Naoko Hasegawa wrote a series of thirteen light novels continuing from the first OVA series, starting with "One Visitor After Another: Hexagram Of Love" in 1993.

Seven Seas Entertainment has licensed the light novels Shin Tenchi Muyo! Jurai, Shin Tenchi Muyo! Yosho, Shin Tenchi Muyo! Washu for a North American release in 2017, and released them as True Tenchi Muyo! in 2018 and 2019.

=== Video games ===
Numerous video games have been released based on the franchise, such as Tenchi Muyo! Game Hen for the Super Famicom.

=== Radio ===
A radio drama was released titled Tenchi Muyo! Ryo-ohki Manatsu no Carnival.

=== Stage play ===
On AnimeJapan 2019, it was announced on AIC Rights' booth that a stage play based on the first season of Ryo-Ohki was in development, scheduled to premiere in 2019. On May 17, the cast and staff was announced, with Kazuhiro Igarashi writing the script and Kazuma Sato starring as Tenchi Masaki. It ran from July 17 to the 21st on the Shinjukumura Live venue, in Tokyo.

== Spin-offs ==
The first Tenchi spinoff is the Magical Girl Pretty Sammy series, a magical girl series where Sasami is the lead character. The first use of Pretty Sammy was in the Tenchi Muyo! Sound File, a Japanese-only music video release. The same animation was used in the ending of the Tenchi Muyo! Mihoshi Special. In 1995, a three episode Pretty Sammy OVA series began, where Sasami, who is known as Sasami Kawai, magically becomes Pretty Sammy. The second Pretty Sammy series is a TV series, which came out in 1996, also known as Magical Project S. This series is in a separate continuity from the OVA series. Pretty Sammy also appears in the Mihoshi Special toward the end of Mihoshi's story, and in an alternate reality sequence in the Tenchi Universe series.

Also created by Masaki Kajishima, the 1997 OVA series Photon: The Idiot Adventures is related to the Tenchi Muyo! Ryo-Ohki universe. Tenchi Muyo! War on Geminar from 2009 uses a number of elements from Photon, such as Koros, Aho energy, having a princess named Lashara, and a young hero with such strong superhuman abilities he's practically invincible.

Also by Masaki Kajishima, the 1998 OVA series Spaceship Agga Ruter and its 1999 visual novel continuation Space Ofera Agga Ruter ~Kyoufu no Uchuu Majo~ take place in Tenchi Muyo! universe.

The 1999 series Dual! Parallel Trouble Adventure is related to the Tenchi Muyo! Ryo-ohki universe, due to the blatant use of the "Lighthawk Wings" associated with the Jurai dynasty in Tenchi Muyo. The creator of both Dual! and Tenchi Muyo!, Masaki Kajishima, confirmed that Dual! does relate to Tenchi Muyo!, and is in fact an alternate version of the Tenchi Muyo! universe.

Guardians of Order published a line of English-language Tenchi Muyo role-playing game books based on the various series in the Tenchi franchise starting in 2000.

Tenchi Muyo! GXP was released in Japan in 2001. The series takes place during the Kajishima version of the OVA continuity, and is set a year after the events of the third OVA series (despite being released first chronologically). The main character is Seina Yamada, a friend of Tenchi Masaki who accidentally joined the Galaxy Police. Many characters from Tenchi Muyo! Ryo-ohki make appearances in this series, including the use of Seiryo Tennan as a major character and a full-fledged Tenchi Muyo! crossover in episode 17.

Battle Programmer Shirase is a 2003 spin-off of the Pretty Sammy OVA and TV series, keeping the character Misao Amano from Pretty Sammy, and with the main character Akira Shirase, Misao's great-uncle; however, it bears little in common with either Pretty Sammy series because it has neither magic, nor Sasami, nor Misao's alter ego Pixy Misa.

Sasami: Magical Girls Club aired in Japan in 2006. The third spin-off featuring Sasami (known here as Sasami Iwakura) as the main character.

The most recent Tenchi spin-off series is called Tenchi Muyo! War on Geminar (aka Isekai no Seikishi Monogatari) which follows the tale of Tenchi's half-brother Kenshi Masaki as he finds himself in a foreign world that uses humanoid machines to fight their wars.
