= Masaki Kajishima =

Japanese animator and storyboard artist (born 1962)

Masaki Kajishima (梶島 正樹 Kajishima Masaki, born March 16, 1962) is a Japanese animator and storyboard artist who works for AIC in a freelance capacity. He is best known as the creator of Tenchi Muyo! and Dual! Parallel Trouble Adventure. The main character of Tenchi Muyo!, Tenchi Masaki, was named after Kajishima (although the "Masaki" in Tenchi's name is the character's surname and is written with different kanji).

Kajishima was born in Japan in Okayama Prefecture. He was educated at the Osaka Design College.

In addition to his anime works, he has written and published a collection of several dōjinshi dubbed Kajishima Onsen, comics, and stories. He is also the author of the Tenchi Muyo! GXP novels.

== Works ==
=== Anime ===
- Tenchi Muyo! Ryo-Ohki (OVA, 1992–present)
- Photon: The Idiot Adventures (OVA, 1997–1999)
- Spaceship Agga Ruter (OVA, 1998–1999)
- Masquerade (OVA, 1998–1999, 2000–2001)
- Dual! Parallel Trouble Adventure (TV/OVA, 1999)
- Tenchi Muyo! GXP (TV, 2002)
- Tenchi Muyo! War on Geminar (OVA, 2009–2010)

=== Novels ===
- Tenchi Muyo! GXP (2003–ongoing, 18 volumes)
- Paradise War (2013–2014, 3 volumes)
