= Hibiki =

Hibiki is a Japanese word which can be translated as "echo" or "resonance" among other meanings. It may refer to:

== People ==
- Hibiki Nagai (長井 響, born 2000), Japanese footballer
- Hibiki Tsuha (津波 響樹, born 1998), Japanese long jumper
- Reine Hibiki, a Japanese illustrator whose work includes art for Maria-sama ga Miteru
- Hibiki Ōtsuki (大槻 ひびき, born 1988), Japanese AV actress and an idol singer
- Hibiki Yoshizaki (吉崎 響, born 1980), Japanese video artist
- Hibiki Taira (平良 響, born 2000), Japanese racing driver
- Takashi Hibiki (日引 俊詞, born 1963), Japanese scientist
- Hibiki Goto (後藤 響, born 2004), Japanese footballer
- Ayaka Hibiki (響 綾香, born 1974), Japanese stage actress and voice actress

== Fictional characters ==
- Dan Hibiki, a character in the fighting game series Street Fighter
- Hibiki Amawa, a character in the anime I My Me! Strawberry Eggs
- Hibiki Takane, a character in the Last Blade fighting game series
- Hibiki Tokai, a character in the anime Vandread
- Go Hibiki, the Japanese name for the character Speed Racer in the 1997 series
- Joe Hibiki (枇々木 丈), a character in the anime series Gatchaman Crowds
- Kamen Rider Hibiki, a Japanese tokusatsu superhero television series
  - Kamen Rider Hibiki (character), the title character of the series
- Midori Hibiki, a teacher from the manga Yu-Gi-Oh! GX
- Koyo Hibiki, brother of Midori Hibiki
- Ran Hibiki, a character from the Rival Schools fighting game series
- Ryoga Hibiki, a character in the anime Ranma ½
- Yūta Hibiki (響 裕太), a character in the anime series SSSS.Gridman
- Hibiki, the title character from the manga Hibiki's Magic
- Hibiki, a character from the manga Change 123
- Hibiki Hojo, a character from magical girl anime Suite PreCure
- Hibiki Ganaha, a character in their Life simulation game and anime The Idolmaster
- Hibiki Tachibana, a character in the anime Senki Zesshō Symphogear
- Hibiki of the Mizaki clan, a character in Hakkenden: Eight Dogs of the East
- Hibiki is the Japanese name for the male protagonist of Pokémon HeartGold and SoulSilver
- Hibiki Kohaku, a character in the fighting game series BlazBlue
- Hibiki Kuze, the main character from the anime Devil Survivor 2: The Animation and its video game
- Hibiki Amami, the main character in the series Re-kan!
- Hibiki Hagyū, a main character from the anime series Anne Happy
- Hibiki Lates, a background character in the anime and manga series Fairy Tail
- Hibiki Sakura, the main character of the manga series How Heavy Are the Dumbbells You Lift?
- Hibiki Sakurama, a main character from Go! Go! Loser Ranger!
- Hibiki, a shipgirl (destroyer) from the anime Kantai Collection
- Hibiki Otonokoji, a character in the Danganronpa fangame Super Danganronpa Another 2
- Hibiki Nekozuka, a character in the role-playing game Blue Archive

== Other ==
- Hibiki (whisky), a Japanese whisky
- Hibiki, a warship that served in the Imperial Japanese Navy during World War II
- "Hibiki" (Kanjani Eight song), a song by Japanese boy band Kanjani Eight
- "Hibiki" (Bad Bunny and Mora song), a song by Puerto Rican rappers Bad Bunny and Mora
- Hibiki, a performance piece by the dance troupe Sankai Juku
- Dendrobium Hibiki, a grex of the orchid species Dendrobium
- Hi-Fi Rush (video game), a third-person action game released in 2023 had the codename Hibiki during development
