= List of Pretty Sammy characters =

This article is a list of fictional characters from the anime series Magical Girl Pretty Sammy with characters from both the OVA's and the Pretty Sammy television series (Magical Project S in the US).

== Main ==
Sasami Kawai (河合 砂沙美, Kawai Sasami) / Pretty Sammy (プリティサミー, Puriti Samī)
Based on Sasami Masaki Jurai, Sasami is a schoolgirl whose parents run a music store, CD Vision. Sasami was sent off by her parents to deliver a CD to a house she has never been to, and discovers that the customer was actually Tsunami, who then introduces herself to Sasami. Sasami was given a magical baton that would allow her to transform into the magical girl, Pretty Sammy. She was also given Ryo-Ohki as her advisor.
Sasami is voiced by Chisa Yokoyama. and by Sherry Lynn in the English version of the OVA series

Misao Amano (天野 美紗緒, Amano Misao) / Pixy Misa (ピクシィミサ, Pikushyi Misa)
Misao Amano is Sasami's best friend. A kind, soft-spoken, and rather shy girl with dark purple hair, she tends to take a passive role, quietly following and watching the more energetic Sasami. She is transformed into Pixy Misa, a boisterous magical girl villain with blonde hair who uses a bow-like weapon to summon Love-Love Monsters to foil Pretty Sammy's day. She speaks in "weird English" (or with a French accent in the English dub)
Misao is voiced by Rumi Kasahara and by Sue Turner-Cray in the English version of the first OVA episode and Debi Derryberry for the English version of the remaining two OVA episodes.

Ryo-Ohki (魎皇鬼, Ryō-ōki)
Ryo-Ohki, the cabbit, serves as Sasami's advisor. In contrast to the counterpart at Tenchi Muyo!, Ryo-Ohki is male, can speak, and can also transform into a boy.
Ryo-Ohki is voiced by Etsuko Kozakura and by Debi Derryberry in the English version of the OVA series.

Tsunami (津名魅)
Based on her Tenchi Muyo! counterpart, Tsunami is a candidate to be the queen of Juraihelm. After she was chosen, she chose Sasami to act as her representative on Earth. In contrast to her Tenchi Muyo! character, she is not connected or related to Sasami, and she is far more carefree, relaxed, and air-headed.
Tsunami is voiced by Chisa Yokoyama. and by Sherry Lynn in the English version of the first OVA episode, and by Lara Cody for the English version of the remaining 2 OVA episodes.

Ramia (裸魅亜)
Passed over by the council of Juraihelm to be the candidate for Queen, Ramia attempts to undermine Tsunami's bid by having her brother Rumiya transform someone on Earth to be a magical girl villain. She has long red hair.
Ramia is voiced by Maya Okamoto. and by Susan Brecht in the English version of the OVA series.

Rumiya (留魅耶)
Ramia's little brother. He can transform into a bird that uses hypnosis to transform Misao into magical girl Pixy Misa.
Rumiya is voiced by Mifuyu Hiiragi. and by Susan Marie Brecht in the English version of the OVA series.

== Tenchi Muyo! characters ==
Tenchi Muyo! characters were recast in both the OVA and TV in different roles:

For the characters that were recast for the OVA series include:

- Mihoshi Mizutani (水谷 美星, Mizutani Mihoshi), a college student who works at CD Vision, based on Mihoshi Kuramitsu
- Yuri Kiyone (清音 由梨, Kiyone Yuri), a co-worker at CD Vision who didn't get into college, based on Kiyone Makibi
- Washu Kobayashi (小林 鷲羽, Kobayashi Washu), a child genius high school science teacher who knows of Sasami's identity, based on Washu Hakubi
- Tenchi Kawai, Sasami's brother and a high school student, based on Tenchi Masaki.
- Ryoko Hakubi and Ayeka Masaki Jurai also make appearances as high school students fighting for Tenchi's affections.

For the Tenchi Muyo! character that were recast for Pretty Sammy TV series include:

- Mihoshi Mizutani (水谷 美星, Mizutani Mihoshi), Sasami's homeroom teacher, based on Mihoshi Kuramitsu
- Kiyone Amayuri (雨百合 清音, Amayuri Kiyone), a teacher at Sasami's school, based on Kiyone Makibi
- Washu Fitzgerald Kobayashi (鷲羽・フィッツジェラルド・小林, Washu Fittsujerarudo Kobayashi), an American child genius who graduated from MIT, and comes to Sasami's school as a science teacher, based on Washu Hakubi
- "Overly Splendid" Oryo (素晴らしすぎるお魎, Subarashi Sugiru Oryō), a bodyguard to Tsunami, based on Ryoko Hakubi
- Romio (露美御), a third candidate for Queen of Juraihelm, based on Ayeka Masaki Jurai

Other Tenchi Muyo! characters have cameos in the TV series including:

- Tenchi Masaki as a high school kid that Sasami admires
- Genjuro Hagakure, based on Katsuhito Masaki
- Binpachi Hagakure, based on Yosho
- Shinobi Hagakure, based on Achika Masaki
- Nobuyuki Onjigoku, based on Nobuyuki Masaki

== Pretty Sammy OVA minor characters ==
=== Chihiro Kawai ===
Chihiro Kawai (河合 ちひろ) is Sasami's and Tenchi's mother and the owner of the CD-Vision music store. Once a successful pop singer, she is a huge fan of karaoke and regularly leaves her daughter no choice but to sing with her, much to Sasami's annoyance. Her biggest hit song was Ai no Makeikusa (Losing the Fight of Love; Your Hiroshi in the dubbed version), which is featured in the beginning of the first episode, and as the ending theme for the second episode of the Pretty Sammy OVA.

Her addiction to karaoke is ceaseless, and she even goes as far as to raid the cash register in order to buy a new high-end personal computer, mistaking it for a high-tech karaoke machine. When Pixy Misa causes the software to malfunction, she goes into extreme withdrawals. Kiyone and Mihoshi are left dealing with her while Tenchi and Sasami go to Akihabara to look for software, a search that is complicated by Bif Standard's takeover.

She appears again as one of the members of the Team Sexy Mrs. in Magical Project S, but she has no relationship with Sasami or Tenchi.

Voiced by: Rica Matsumoto (Japanese), Ellen Gerstell (English, ep. 1), Rebecca Forstadt (English, ep. 2-3)

=== Yuri Kouzuki, Yuka Shinjo, and Yuma Shiratori ===
Yuri Kouzuki (上月 由里), Yuka Shinjo (新城 由佳), and Yuma Shiratori (白鳥 結真)
Yuri, Yuka, and Yuma are Ayeka's servants. Other than providing basic services for Ayeka, such as dragging her carriage around and handling her stuff, they are usually sent out to spy on Ryoko's activities, as Ryoko also has a huge crush on Tenchi as well.

=== Shigeki Amano ===
Shigeki Amano (天野 茂樹)
Shigeki is Misao's father. He is a world-famous composer. One of his compositions serves as Misao's theme song.

Shigeki left his wife, Kotoe, and his family, after a bitter argument with her, leaving Misao heartbroken. He was seen in Misao's flashbacks.

Voiced by: Takehiro Murozono

=== Kotoe Amano ===
Kotoe Amano (天野 琴恵)
Kotoe is Misao's mother and Shigeki's estranged wife (though she is unnamed in the OAV).

After Shigeki abandoned his family, Kotoe was left in charge of taking care of Misao. Although she seems to be a very busy business woman that is hardly around, she does deeply care about her daughter and works hard to support her. Her only appearances in the OVA series are during Misao's flashbacks, when she was arguing with Shigeki when he was leaving them, and when Misao reminiscing about how her parents would take her out for a walk.

=== High Priest ===
The High Priest (神官長, Shinkanchō) is an old man who is leader of a council of 108 priests that select the candidate who will become the next Queen of Juraihelm. The priest announces Tsunami, much to Ramia's dismay, and asks her to choose her champion. Ramia and the priest are perplexed to see her choice, Sasami, caught in an eccentric moment of singing karaoke with Chihiro.

High Priest's appearance in the OVA is brief, but he also appears in the Magical Girl Pretty Sammy manga story. Tsunami reveals her prankster side as she marks on the High Priest's face, writing "Ramia was here", after she had stopped time in order to aid Sammy. After the time freeze is over, the Priest is confused as to what happened but becomes furious upon seeing his face in the mirror. He forces Ramia to do menial tasks such as cleaning the floor.

Voiced by: Ikuya Sawaki (Japanese); Jack Kandel (English)

=== Bif Standard ===
Bif Standard (ビフ・スタンダード, Bifu Sutandādo) is an incredibly rich computer software mogul meant to be a parody of Bill Gates, with his company StandardSoft being a parody of Microsoft. Appears in Episode 2 of the Pretty Sammy OVA. He is shown to be quite eccentric and wants to "standardize" the world through his software, aptly named "World Standard". In his mind, there should be no individuality, and everyone should be peaceful, happy conformists. Bif is in Japan, very agitated that the country is not using his software, used by 95% of the world. Ramia comes to him offering to help. At first he is suspicious, but upon seeing Ramia's great magical powers, he reconsiders.

The boost from Ramia and Misa's powers to his plans only causes him to become even more obsessive with his goals. Tenchi, who is only trying to find some karaoke software for his mother, gets on Bif's bad side after insulting his software and then acquiring the Pineapple Mach 8 OS (a parody of the Apple Macintosh) from an underground software dealer. He sends Pixy Misa and her monsters to attack Tenchi, which brings Pretty Sammy to the scene. Bif supports Ramia's plan to crash the Moon into Earth because he thinks he will be able to build his standardized empire anew after the impact.

With some help from Washu who disabled Bif's connection to his network, Sammy is finally able to knock some sense into him upon using her magic on him, or so it seems... Although Bif is no longer evil, he is still as eccentric as ever and completely devoted, hoping to carry on his company in a different manner.

Voiced by: Ryusuke Ohbayashi (as Ryunosuke Ohbayashi) (Japanese), John DeMita (English)

=== Sam Hikari Langley ===
Sam Hikari Langley (サム・ヒカリ・ラングレイ, Sam Hikari Rangurei) appears in Episode 2, Sam is Biff's personal butler and right-hand man. He seems completely devoted to his master's cause and helps as a go-between for him in communicating with the Police at one point. Sam tries to listen in carefully when Ramia and Rumiya are discussing plans with each other, showing that he may be slightly suspicious of them.

Voiced by: Hiroshi Naka

=== Makoto Mizushina ===
Makoto Mizushina (ミズシナ 摩己斗, Mizushina Makoto) is a boy that Sasami meets while on a company-sponsored CD Vision trip in Episode 3. He works at a nearby resort and bears a resemblance to Tenchi in Sasami's eyes. Kiyone tries hitting on him at first, but finds herself rejected much to her dismay. Since he seems interested in Sasami, Kiyone, Mihoshi, and Chihiro take him to be a pedophile. He generally has a friendly demeanor and tries to help Sasami find Misao when she has gone missing. Ryo-Ohki is a little annoyed by Sasami's interest in Makoto.

Makoto is actually an alien that arrived on a comet that struck Earth, and his true form is a small green blob-like creature. They had the ability to link up with people and acquire their characteristics, and in his case, he linked up with Pretty Sammy. This gave him the capability to read Sasami's feelings, but did not reveal them to Sasami herself. After Hiroshi made his threat to Sasami, Makoto revealed who he truly was to Ryo-Ohki. After Sammy was knocked unconscious, he tried to take on Hiroshi, but ended up being no match and his link to Sasami was broken. Makoto was forced back to his real form, but before he did he told Ryo-Ohki that he was envious of him because he knew from linking with Sasami "you're the one she...". He is cut off before he can say the rest, but it is implied Ryo-Ohki is the one Sasami likes, given his earlier conversation with Sasami.

Sammy shows up later and never found out what happened to Makoto. She bumps into a boy who looks exactly like Makoto, and is confused when the boy had no recollection of her. In the end, Ryo-Ohki explains that Makoto said he had to go away for a while. Nothing is known about what happened to Makoto's true form.

Voiced by: Hiroshi Kamiya (Japanese); Andrew Philpot (English)

=== Hiroshi ===
Hiroshi (碑露志, Hiroshi) is a sinister, psychotic man with dark purple hair and sunglasses who had found Ramia on the beach when she was stricken with amnesia in Episode 3. He possesses enormous magical powers, so much so that he harmed Pixy Misa greatly in his first encounter. Hiroshi was searching for Pretty Sammy, as the only thing on his mind was destroying her and then taking out Tsunami in Juraihelm afterwards. He decided to go on a destructive rampage when Pixy Misa said all he had to do to bring Sammy out was to cause a disturbance. Sasami is horrified when she finds Misao unconscious and badly hurt, and in order to appease Hiroshi's desire and keep him from causing further harm, shows up for a challenge.

It is revealed that Hiroshi possesses his great powers because he belongs to the same race as Makoto, and he had linked up to Ramia, acquiring her urge to destroy Sammy and Tsunami. At first, Pretty Sammy tries her hardest, using all of her magical strength to defeat Hiroshi, but that alone is not enough to defeat the man who had linked up with a powerful sorcerer. Badly beaten and unconscious, Sammy was able to get a recharge to her magical power from Ryo-Ohki. Misa, back in full health, joined the battle this time, and they were able to defeat Hiroshi with their combined magical power.

In the end, Hiroshi's true form was collected in a jar by Washu, who knew about the alien race through one of them who had linked up with herself.

Voiced by: Taiki Matsuno (Japanese); Andrew Philpot (English)

== Magical Project S minor characters ==
=== Heita Hirata ("Peter") ===
Heita Hirata (平田 平太, Hirata Heita), nicknamed "Peter" (ペーター, Pētā) is a young boy who breeds Love-Love Monsters on a remote island. Pixy Misa wants Peter to strengthen the monsters so they can defeat Pretty Sammy. Peter, however, is actually a friendly personality who loves and respects the monsters, which makes them disloyal to Misa and useless against Sammy. After convincing Pretty Sammy that the Love-Love Monsters weren't evil, Pretty Sammy was able to transport him and the Love-Love Monsters to safety just before the island's volcano erupted, and afterwards they are able to live in peace.

Voiced by: Mizue Ohtsuka

=== Principal Miura ===
Principal Miura (三浦校長, Miura-kōchō) is the principal of the school Sasami attends, Umi no Hoshi Elementary, and is a namesake of AIC producer Toru Miura who worked on the Tenchi and Pretty Sammy series. Miura has a somewhat eccentric personality and is blunt in speech. Between the appearance of the magical girls, Mihoshi and Kiyone's rivalry, and Washu's scientific meddling, the school is involved in countless incidents, but Miura never seems to be that concerned by all of this.

Voiced by: Ryusuke Ohbayashi (as Ryunosuke Ohbayashi)

=== Keiko ===
Keiko (恵子, Keiko) works as the assistant to director to Tenchi Masaki for the Blue Sky Cool Rangers show. When Sasami went to meet Tenchi as he was moving to Tokyo to work as a theatrical director, to her dismay she found out that Keiko is already Tenchi's girlfriend and she was moving to Tokyo with him.
Voiced by: Yuka Koyama

=== Andou Toyokawa ===
Andou Toyokawa (アンドゥ 豊川, Andu Toyokawa) is a handsome and charming gentleman who was to marry Kiyone Amayuri in an arranged marriage set up by Kiyone's mother. When she went to meet Andou, a thinly disguised Mihoshi, Principal Miura, Sasami, Sasami's parents, Ryo-Ohki, Misao, Konoha, Eimi, Kenji, and Hiroto (all wearing sunglasses) were observing them to see how things would go.

During the meeting, Andou seemed to share all of Kiyone's interests, and Kiyone felt that he is perhaps the one that she should marry. However, Pixy Misa exposed him as a fraud by bringing all the girls that were jilted by him. However, after Pretty Sammy defeated Break-Up Girl, Andou tried to propose to Sammy. A heartbroken Kiyone then fell into shock. Mihoshi, who was offended by this, knocked Andou into the distance with a powerful uppercut.

Voiced by: Toru Furusawa

=== Boss ===
Boss (番長, Banchō) is an intimidating tough guy figure that has a band of three followers and claims his mission is to take over the school. He looks like he could be much older, but Gariko claims that he is "10 years, 6 months" old, a boy about the same age as the rest of the class. Somewhat dimwitted, Boss mistakes Sasami for a guy when she rather haphazardly gets pointed out as the strongest in the class. Pixy Misa shows up and says to Boss that Pretty Sammy is the strongest in the school, not Sasami, and gets the challenge set up.

Thinking that Misao is in danger and has been kidnapped, Sammy shows up for the challenge. Initially, Boss has lost by falling off a ledge, but Pixy Misa imbues him with power by using "Calling Mistakes". Boss becomes gigantic, crushing Sammy, and making Misa finally believe that she had won. Boss's gang cannot stand the sight of their leader turned into a monster, and upon seeing their reaction, Boss gets all emotional too. Sammy is able to restore him to normal, and afterwards Boss and his gang leave, but with a newfound respect for Pretty Sammy. Boss and his gang also make a brief cameo appearance to watch Pretty Sammy's duel against Pixy Misa just before Team Sexy Mrs. showed up.

He and Gariko make a cameo appearance in Majokko Tsukune-chan.
Voiced by: Kazunari Tanaka

=== Boss' Gang ===
==== Chibiroku ====
Chibiroku (チビ六, Chibiroku) is a member of Boss's gang whose talent is being really quick and hard to catch. Sammy easily outwits him by just standing and doing nothing, making him waste his energy.

Voiced by: Isshin Chiba

==== Dosumasa ====
Dosumasa (ドス政, Dosumasa) is a member of Boss's gang who is an expert at throwing knives. Sammy retorts that dealing with knives is dangerous, and eventually Dosumasa messes up while he is juggling knives and injures himself. Sammy defeats him, but first reinforces a "never try this at home kids" message.

Voiced by: Takayuki Okada

==== Gariko ====
Gariko (ガリ公, Garikō) is a boy with glasses in Boss's gang who is the brains behind the group. He carries around a dictionary which he consults often, and it contains entries on all kinds of subjects, even Pretty Sammy herself. When he is the last to challenge Sammy, he is brimming with confidence, saying he has formulated a perfect strategy. Pretty Sammy just whacks him with her baton while he is in the middle of babbling about his strategy.

Voiced by: Daisuke Ishikawa

=== Team "Lovely Madams" (Team "Sexy Mrs.") ===
Team "Lovely Madams" (人妻隊, Hitozuma-tai) (translation: Married Women Squad) a.k.a. Team Sexy Mrs. (チームセクシーミセス, Chīmu Sekushī Misesu) are a villainess team set up by Ramia in her attempt to defeat Pretty Sammy. Ramia goes to Earth disguised in a bird costume and uses her "Magical Eyes" to transform a group of housewives into a magical team. Team Sexy Mrs. arrive on the scene after Misa has supposedly challenged Sammy to a "final battle" and lost. They have their own special ability, called "Sexy Space" (セクシー空間, Sekushī Kūkan) ("Lovely Space" in Pioneer's subtitles), which overwhelms Pretty Sammy's Pretty Space and causes her to lose initially.

Misa rejoices in the victories of the Team Sexy Mrs. and the chance to make Sammy suffer, even though she sits back and does nothing the whole time. With the situation looking hopeless, military forces of the JSDF, United States 7th Fleet, and United Nations attempt to stop them, but they are no match for the powers of the Sexy Mrs. With some advice from Ginji (who was able to distract the team with his "Dandy Power") and Washu, Sammy is able to come up with a strategy that enhances her Pretty Space and makes it stand up against the Sexy Space. Before they are defeated, the Team informs Misa that she could use Sexy Power just like them, allowing her to use stronger abilities in the future.

==== Miyuki ("Mrs. One") ====
Miyuki (美由紀, Miyuki) a.k.a. "Mrs. One" (ミセスワン, Misesu Wan) is a rather ordinary housewife with a loving husband and baby girl who lives in the apartment right next door to Misao, and she is also a great cook. As a member of Team Sexy Mrs., Miyuki possesses related to usual housewife duties, like lobbing a shopping basket at her foes. She is also apparently the leader and the closest to Misa. Her team number is 1, in English cardinal numbering. Miyuki is the only housewife who shows up later after being turned back to normal, coming across Misao when she is in despair and offering advice.

Voiced by: Aya Ishizu

==== Kaori ("Mrs. Zwei") ====
Kaori (香織, Kaori) a.k.a. "Mrs. Zwei" (ミセスツヴァイ, Misesu Tsuvai) is a housewife who is vain about her beauty. As a member of Team Sexy Mrs., Kaori distracts men with her beauty and destroys them while they are caught off guard. Her team number is 2, in German.

Voiced by: Michiko Neya

==== Yumi ("Mrs. Third") ====
Yumi (有美, Yumi) a.k.a. "Mrs. Third" (ミセスサード, Misesu Sādo) is a college student that married young in life and is the envy of her friends, since she appears so happy to them. As a member of Team Sexy Mrs., Yumi has athletic attacks and a magical tickling device that she tortures Sammy with when Misa calls for it. Her team number is 3, in English ordinal numbering.

Voiced by: Chiharu Tezuka

==== Chihiro ("Mrs. Si") ====
Chihiro (ちひろ, Chihiro) a.k.a. "Mrs. Sì" (ミセススー, Misesu Sū) is a housewife who is rather obsessed with singing karaoke and a cameo of Chihiro Kawai from the OVA's. As a member of Team Sexy Mrs., Chihiro's karaoke singing possesses destructive powers. Her team number is 4, in Chinese (pronounced "suh").

Voiced by: Rica Matsumoto

==== Yukie ("Mrs. Cinq") ====
Yukie (雪江, Yukie) a.k.a. "Mrs. Cinq" (ミセスサンク, Misesu Sanku) is an office lady who is married to a man who works in the same office and often brings meals with her to work. As a member of Team Sexy Mrs., Yukie can turn flirtatious gestures like a wink into an attack. Her team number is 5, in French.

Voiced by: Yuriko Yamaguchi (voice actor)

==== Chisato ("Mrs. Roku") ====
Chisato (千里, Chisato) a.k.a. "Mrs. Roku" (ミセスろく, Misesu Roku) is a young girl and only member of the team who is not actually married, though she is arranged to marry someone. Her attacks as a member of Team Sexy Mrs. are of the playful variety, like using cat's cradle to entangle foes. Her team number is 6, in Japanese.

Voiced by: Emi Motoi

=== Hikari ===
Hikari (樋香里, Hikari), Earth disguise name "Hikari Asahina" (朝比奈 樋香理, Asahina Hikari) is a girl from Juraihelm who is a childhood friend of Ryo-Ohki. Ramia sends her to Earth thinking she will hate Sasami and cause trouble. When Hikari transfers into Sasami's class, though, she becomes friends rather quickly and finds nothing wrong about her. Misao gets somewhat jealous of the situation, with Hikari proving to be a talented, athletic girl who can also play the piano.

Ramia, not pleased with the situation, finds a way to convince Hikari that Sasami had been mistreating Ryo-Ohki. It was more the other way around, with Sasami complaining that Ryo-Ohki had been too tough in training her. Hikari kidnaps Ryo-Ohki and kept him bound with a magic spell. Sasami gets worried and goes around searching for Ryo-Ohki, who eventually tries to reach her with telepathy. Hikari challenges Sasami, initially having the upper hand since she had the ability to reflect magic back at Sasami using a barrier. Seeing Ryo-Ohki cover for Sammy weakened her resolve, allowing Sammy to purge her of Ramia's evil spell.

Hikari makes two cameo appearances. In Episode 23, she is weakened when her powers are absorbed by Romio and in Episode 26, she prayed for Pretty Sammy and Pixy Misa to defeat Romio.

Voiced by: Kyoko Hikami

== Love Love Monsters listing ==
=== OVA Love Love Monsters ===
==== Love-Love Monsters ====
Love-Love Monsters (ラブラブモンスター, Raburabu Monsutā) (Ryoko (Tenchi Muyo!) and Ayeka Masaki Jurai transformed. In the manga, there are two similar monsters that are Tenchi and a female gym teacher transformed).

Created when Pixy Misa transformed Ryoko and Ayeka into Love Love Monsters when they were fighting over Tenchi. In this form they were able to fight over Tenchi, as they were loving him to death, that is until Pretty Sammy intervened. However Pretty Sammy was at a disadvantage, as this was her first battle and they began to love her to death as well. But when Tenchi was able to reach out to them and they remembered when Tenchi had comforted them which Pretty Sammy could sense and was able to restore them to normal with her Pretty Coquettish Bomber.

The term "Love-Love Monsters" is originally applied to the monsters for the first episode of Pretty Sammy OVA. But past that point it is used as a generic term for monsters spawned by Ramia or those who possess her powers (like Misa and Hiroshi).

==== Digital Love-Love Monsters ====
Vacuum Boy (掃除機男, Sōjiki Otoko) ("Voltaic Vacuum Boy" in English dub)
Monkey Boy (猿男, Saru Otoko) ("Mach 12 Monkey Monster" in English dub)
Leopard Girl (豹女, Hyō Onna) ("Panther Patty" in English dub)

Created through a combination of Bif Standard's Network and Pixy Misa's magic. Vacuum Boy, and Monkey Man were easily overwhelming Sammy, while Leopard Girl stole the Music Software CD from Tenchi.

After finding out from Rumiya about Bif and Ramia's plan to crash the moon on Earth to create a digitized network, Pixy Misa chose to help Pretty Sammy. Vacuum Boy was destroyed when Pixy Misa used her Magical Wind to send him into an electric signboard, Leopard Girl was destroyed when she tried to use her Kamikaze Claw attack and missed, Monkey Boy was destroyed when Pixy Misa turned her baton into a gun and shot him.

Vacuum Boy Voiced by: Steve Blum
Monkey Boy Voiced by: Wendee Lee
Leopard Girl Voiced by: Lara Cody

==== Queen Girl ====
Queen Girl (クイーン女, Kuīn Onna) - Summoned by Pixy Misa to deal with Hiroshi. Easily killed by Hiroshi's Tank Girl.

==== Tank Girl ====
Tank Girl (重戦車女, Jūsensha Onna) - Summoned by Hiroshi to destroy Pixy Misa's Queen Girl.

Also, Hiroshi summoned a hoard of unnamed Love Monsters to fight Pretty Sammy, and she was able to destroy them, but had exhausted herself in the process.

=== TV Series Love Love Monsters ===
==== CD Girl ====
CD Girl (CD女, Shīdī Onna) is created from a CD from CD Vision that Sasami had delivered to Pixy Misa. CD Girls special ability is that she uses razor sharp CDs that are stored in two mounted spots in her chest area, but even she has a limited supply of CDs. She can also shoot fireballs from the tip of her guitar when she plays it. An inexperienced Pretty Sammy lost to her during their first battle, but despite not getting any training done, Sammy was able to defeat CD Girl by protecting her friends Hiroto and Kenji, and then summoning Pretty Space for the first time. However, the original CD that CD Girl was created from was covered in scratches after the battle.

Voiced by: Rin Mizuhara

==== Comic Girl ====
Comic Girl (コミック女, Komikku Onna) is created from the Dragon A comic book that Konoha had hidden away at her prep school. Comic Girl's special abilities are that she can alter her face by turning her pages, trap innocent children into her body and literally turn them into comic strip, as well as bring objects to life (such as a giant comic book and knife) to use as weapons. Luckily when Konoha slammed into Comic Girl it canceled out Comic Girl's weapons, which enabled Pretty Sammy to destroy her.

Voiced by: Miki Itou

==== PE Girl ====
PE Girl (体育女, Taiiku Onna) is created from the Vault Box that Mihoshi was attempting to get her class to jump over. PE Girl's abilities are that she can shoot the vaults and shot puts from the cannons all over her body. PE Girl also can transform by rearranging her body with other vault box parts into a gigantic form, but when she tried to step on Pretty Sammy, PE Girl forgot that vault boxes are hollow and could not harm Sammy. Sammy destroyed PE Girl after performing a vault jump that toppled PE Girl over.

Voiced by: Mizue Ohtsuka

==== Karaoke Girl ====
Karaoke Girl (カラオケ女, Karaoke Onna) first fought Pretty Sammy and was able to use her song to keep Pretty Sammy at bay until her song's time ran out and Sammy then destroyed her. Pixy Misa later brought out Pro-Karaoke Girl during Pretty Sammy's debut concert to boost sales at CD Vision. Pro-Karaoke Girl has a few minor improvements, but none of them are very useful. But she was still able to overwhelm Pretty Sammy again, until Ginji was able to disrupt her song with an electric guitar and Sammy was encouraged by her fans to sing. Pro-Karaoke Girl overloaded when she tried to create feedback, giving Pretty Sammy the chance to destroy her.

Voiced by: Rin Mizuhara

==== Ball Girl & Line Girl ====
Ball Girl (ボール女, Bōru Onna) & Line Girl (ライン女, Rain Onna) are two Love Love Monsters created from a ball and a painted line during a dodgeball game between Mihoshi and Kiyone's classes. Ball Girl could flatten people with her weight and Line Girl could reduce the size of the playing field. After Ryo-ohki arrived it gave Sasami an excuse to run off and become Pretty Sammy. Once on the field Pretty Sammy kept dodging Ball Girl's attacks until she was worn out. Pretty Sammy then immediately destroyed both of them.

Ball Girl Voiced by: Miki Narahashi
Line Girl Voiced by: Kae Araki

==== Chemistry Girl ====
Chemistry Girl (実験女, Jiggen Onna) was created from a flask from Washu's science class. Chemistry Girl used her power to trap Washu in a beaker with potatoes that were being turned to starch. Despite being drowned in it, Washu was more preoccupied with gathering the data on Chemistry Girl. It was easy for Pretty Sammy to destroy Chemistry Girl as she had no legs and couldn't move.

==== Ghost Girl ====
Ghost Girl (ゴースト女, Gōsuto Onna) was created by Pixy Misa during Sasamis sleepover at Misao's apartment. Because she is a ghost, Ghost Girl is immune to Pretty Sammy's attacks. However Washu came to help dressed as Santa Claus (including coming in on a sleigh driven by a mechanical reindeer) to give Pretty Sammy her invention that would give Ghost Girl a body. Although Sammy had no difficulty identifying Washu, she was able to use her invention for her Sammy Flash attack and then finished off Ghost Girl.

Voiced by: Yumi Takada

==== Fake Sick Girl ====
Fake Sick Girl (仮病女, Kebyō Onna) was a Love-Love monster that pretends to be sick while using a hidden weapon to fight back with. She and the other Love-Love Monsters (the ones from the previous TV series episodes) were sent to Peter, a trainer who lived on a secluded island that would train them to become stronger. Fake Sick Girl encountered Sasami's class (with the addition of Washu and Kiyone) to try to find Peter. After Peter was able to convince Sammy to spare them, she transported Peter, Fake Sick Girl, and the other Love-Love Monsters to another safe place before the volcano on the island erupted.

Voiced by: Miki Narahashi

==== Gunman Girl ====
Gunman Girl (ガンマン女, Ganman Onna) was created to assist Nobuyuki Onijigoku in taking over Genjuro Hagakure's theme park. Gunman Girl's speciality is that she can use guns and rocket launchers as her weapons. Gunman Girl's excessive shooting is so great that not even Pixy Misa can control her. When she was about to shoot Binpachi Hakakure, his grandfather took the shot for him. After being convinced by Genjuro that "ninjas are cool", Binpachi rejoined his family's side and distracted Gunman Girl with his ninja skills long enough for Pretty Sammy to destroy Gunman Girl.

Voiced by: Ayumi Kida

==== Chicken Girl ====
Chicken Girl was a Love-Love monster that could splatter eggs on people's faces. Although Pretty Sammy had no trouble destroying Chicken Girl, she accidentally lost her magical baton when she was trying to catch the eggs (to avoid wasting them) that Chicken Girl had left behind.

==== Cheesecake Girl ====
Cheesecake Girl (チーズケーキ女, Chīzukēki Onna) was created from the Cheesecake that Kotoe Amano had made for Misao and Sasami. Deciding to take full advantage since Sasami had lost her baton, Pixy Misa had Cheesecake Girl drown Sasami and the other townspeople in cream cheese. Luckily, when Konoha threw away the baton after failing to win Hiroto's love as Funky Connie, Sasami recovered her baton and easily destroyed Cheesecake Girl.

==== Special Effects Girl ====
Special Effects Girl (特撮女, Tokusatsu Onna) was used by Pixy Misa when Pretty Sammy guest starred on a Cool Ranger episode to save the career of director Tenchi Masaki. Special Effects Girl's special ability is that she can transform people into dinosaur costumes which would slowly transform them into monsters. Pixy Misa threatens to have Pretty Sammy follow the script and sacrifice herself to save Tenchi and the others. With some encouragement from Tenchi, Sammy refused and destroyed Special Effects Girl and then had the courage to ask Tenchi to change that line into something better.

Voiced by: Mizue Ohtsuka

==== Break-Up Girl ====
Break-Up Girl (破談女, Hadan Onna) was created by Pixy Misa from the jilted brides of womanizer Andou Toyokawa during his arranged marriage meeting with Kiyone Amayuri. Break-Up Girl's special ability is that she can create a powerful barrier to resist attacks. However Genji Kawai was able to charm Break-Up Girl and although he was smacked by a jealous Honoka, it gave Pretty Sammy the chance to destroy Break-Up Girl.

Voiced by: Satoko Kitou

==== Baby Goods Girl ====
Baby Goods Girl (ベビー用品女, Bebī Yōhin Onna) - When Sasami is turned into a baby by one of Washu's experiments to turn Sasami into an Adult, Pixy Misa creates this Love-Love Monster. With its milk bottle it threatened to put Baby Pretty Sammy to sleep. Luckily Washu performed the same experiment on Pixy Misa which briefly powered up Baby Goods Girl, but then her power was reduced when Pixy Misa became a baby. Ryo-Ohki then used a line cart to help Sammy finish off Baby Goods Girl.

Voiced by: Kae Araki

==== Cigarette Butt Girl and Empty Can Girl ====
When Pixy Misa injured her wrist during her duel against Pretty Sammy, she created these two from a Cigarette and an empty Pop Can. However being no bigger than the objects they were created from, Sammy easily batted them away with her baton.

==== Hyper Love-Love Monster ====
The Hyper Love-Love Monster (ハイパーラブラブモンスター, Haipā Raburabu Monsutā) was a giant rose created from the Sexy Power that Pixy Misa had inherited from Team Sexy Mrs., and the bouquet of roses that Misao had bought to welcome her father home. Its special pollen can infect anyone (aside from Pretty Sammy) and fill them with a strong hatred if they were to breathe it in, unless if someone were to cover their face (or in Washu's case, where she insulated her house). Pretty Sammy had a difficult battle and was losing until Misao's parents arrived looking for their daughter. Once Misao heard them, her powers as Pixy Misa weakened, giving Sammy the chance to use the power of Shigeki and Kotoe Amano's love to destroy this monster.

==== Lovely Monsters ====
The Lovely Monsters (ラブリィモンスター, Raburyi Monsutā) Right and Left were created by Love-Me Eimi. Their hair is razor sharp and they can use it as a weapon. Their team attack Cross Attack is where they combine their hair and use it as a giant saw to literally cut the Earth in half. While Pretty Sammy was forced to retreat in the first battle, but during the second battle, Sammy had Oryo's assistance, who was disguised as the Cool Ranger's Cool Red. Oryo fought both Right and Left and easily destroyed them after Sammy freed Eimi from Romio's control.
