= Rumi Kasahara =

Japanese voice actress (born 1970)

- 笠原 留美
- Born: March 8, 1970 (age 56); Niigata Prefecture, Japan
- Occupation: Voice actress
- Years active: 1980–present
- Agent: Aoni Production

Rumi Kasahara (笠原 留美, Kasahara Rumi; born March 8, 1970) is a Japanese voice actress affiliated with Aoni Production. She voiced roles in a bunch of titles in the 1990s including Pretty Sammy OVA and TV series, Moeyo Ken, Hell Teacher Nube, Princess Nine, and Sakura Diaries. In video games, she provides the voice of Ena Arashizaki in Money Puzzle Exchanger, Yue Ying in the Dynasty Warriors / Warriors Orochi franchise, Alia in Mega Man, and Futaba Taiga in Sakura Wars New York.

== Filmography ==
=== Anime ===
List of voice performances in anime
Year	Title	Role	Notes	Source
1993–1994	Fortune Quest	Pastel	Debut role	
1993–1994	Kishin Corps	Pearl	Vol. 1, 4	
1994	Tico of the Seven Seas	Maggie Taft		
1994	Sailor Moon S	Ptilol, others		
1995–1997	Magical Girl Pretty Sammy	Misao Amano / Pixy Misa	OAVs	
1995	Jura Tripper	Gatsha		
1996	Hell Teacher Nūbē	Kyoko Inaba		
1996	Magical Project S	Misao Amano / Pixy Misa	TV series	
1996	Debutante Detective Corps	Nina Kirov		
1997	Hyper Police	Kanako		
1997	Kindaichi Case Files	Rumi Nakajima		
1997	Sakura Diaries	Mieko Yotsuba		
1998	Outlaw Star	Clair		
1998	Princess Nine	Kanako Mita, Tomoko Saotome		
1999	Space Pirate Mito	Ranban Nakami 燗磐：中身		
1999	To Heart	Lemmy Miyauchi		
1999	Space Pirate Mito: Aoi & Mutsuki: A Pair of Queens	Ranban		
1999	Omishi Magical Theater: Risky Safety	Kotone Ryuudou		
1999	Dai-Guard	Shizuka Irie		
2001	Tales of Eternia: The Animation	Platia		
2001	Rune Soldier	Isabel		
2001	Shaman King	Kanae		
2001	Angel Tales	Mika		
2003	Air Master	Mika Utsumi		
2003	Stellvia	Chiaki Katase		
2003	Astro Boy	Space clerk, Ghost		
2003	Zatch Bell	Nurse		
2003	Fullmetal Alchemist	Martel		
2004	Detective Conan	Misa Tsuneyama, Misa Uehara		
2004	Paranoia Agent	Taeko's Mother		
2004	To Heart: Remember My Memories	Lemmy Miyauchi		
2005	Moeyo Ken	Miki Saotome		
2006	Yomigaeru Sora – Rescue Wings	Kazumi Nishida		
2006	Powerpuff Girls Z	Nanako		
2007	GeGeGe no Kitaro	Yukijoro	TV series 5	
2007	Mushi-Uta	Mother of poetry		
2008	Rin: Daughters of Mnemosyne	Female Informant		
2008	Kanokon	Jorougumo		
2009	Gokujō!! Mecha Mote Iinchō	Manaka/Mako-san		
2010	Digimon Fusion	Lilamon		
2011	Marvel Anime: Blade	Woman Vampire		
2015	Sailor Moon Crystal	Berthier	ONA series	
2015	Chibi Maruko-chan	Commercial's Singer, Yuriko		

=== Film ===
List of voice performances in feature films
Year	Title	Role	Notes	Source
1993	Make Up! Sailor Soldier	Girl A	short film	
1994	Slam Dunk	Cheerleader		
1996	Jigoku Sensei Nūbē	Kyoko Inaba		
1997	Jigoku Sensei Nūbē: Gozen 0 toki Nūbē Shisu	Kyoko Inaba	film	
1997	Jigoku Sensei Nūbē: Kyoufu no Natsu Yasumi! Asashi no Uni no Gensetsu	Kyoko Inaba	film	
2000	Ah! My Goddess: The Movie	Ere		

=== Video games ===
List of voice performances in video games
Year	Title	Role	Notes	Source
1993	Cotton: Fantastic Night Dreams	Silk	PC Engine	
1994	Princess Minerva	Mizuno	PC Engine	
1995–97	Dōkyūsei series	Kurumi Nishina		
1996	Debutante Detective Corps	Nina Kirov		
1997	Dragon Knight 4	Nereid	PC FX	
1997	Hell Teacher Nūbē	Kyoko Inaba	PS1	
1997	Ah! My Goddess	Ray	Other	
1997	Money Idol Exchanger	Ena Arashizaki / Everyworker	Neo Geo MVS	
1998	Magical Girl Pretty Sammy series	Misao Amano / Pixy Misa		
1998	Wakusei Kougekitai Little Cats	Misato Simon	PS1/PS2	
1998	Star Ocean: The Second Story	Chisato Madison, Feria	PS1/PS2	
1998–2000	Ganbare Goemon series	Yae		
1999	To Heart	Lemmy Miyauchi	PS1/PS2	
2000	Sentimental Graffiti 2	Mari Kurokawa	DC	
2001	Atelier Lilie: The Alchemist of Salburg 3	Elsa Hesse	PS1/PS2	
2001–05	Mega Man X series	Alia, Vanishing Gungaroo	Voiced Alia in every game since X6; Voiced Vanishing Gungaroo in X7	
2001	Hermina and Culus: Atelier Lilie Another Story	Elsa Hesse	PS1/PS2	
2002	Moeyo Ken	Miki Saotome	PS1/PS2	
2003–11	Dynasty Warriors series	Yue Ying	Starting from Dynasty Warriors 4	
2004	Sakura Taisen Monogatari ~Mysterious Paris~	Elsa Flaubert	PS1/PS2	
2007–08	Warriors Orochi series	Yue Ying		
