= Ryūsuke Ōbayashi =

Japanese actor, narrator (b. 1946)

- 大林 隆介
- Born: March 13, 1946 (age 80); Fukuoka Prefecture, Japan
- Occupations: Actor; voice actor; narrator
- Years active: 1966–present
- Agent: 81 Produce
- Height: 171 cm (5 ft 7 in)

Ryūsuke Ōbayashi (大林 隆介, Ōbayashi Ryūsuke; born March 13, 1946 in Fukuoka Prefecture) is a Japanese actor, voice actor and narrator. Some of his best known roles include Soun Tendo in Ranma ½ and Captain Kiichi Goto in Patlabor. He was formerly credited as Ryūnosuke Ōbayashi (大林 隆之介, Ōbayashi Ryūnosuke). He is employed by the talent management firm 81 Produce.

== Filmography ==
=== Television animation ===
- The Super Dimension Fortress Macross (1982) (Exsedol Folmo)
- Mobile Suit Zeta Gundam (1985) (Ben Wooder)
- Mobile Suit Gundam ZZ (1986) (Rakan Dahkaran)
- Patlabor (1989) (Captain Kiichi Gotō)
- Ranma ½ (1989) (Sōun Tendō)
- DNA² (1994) (Yokomori)
- Macross 7 (1994) (Exsedol Folmo)
- Magical Girl Pretty Sammy (1996) (Principal Miura)
- Rurouni Kenshin (1996) (Raijuta Isurugi)
- Fancy Lala (1998) (Mystery Man)
- Serial Experiments Lain (1998) (Yasuo Iwakura)
- Dual! Parallel Trouble Adventure (1999) (Ken Sanada)
- To Heart (1999) (Gengoro Nagase)
- Inuyasha (2001) (Daija (The False Water God))
- Monster (2005) (Fritz Vardemann)
- Hell Girl (2006) (Ryōsuke Sekine)
- D.Gray-man (2008) (Malcolm C. Lvellie)
- Element Hunters (2009) (Kawashima)
- Hyouge Mono (2011) (Yamanoue Sōji)
- WataMote (2013) (Narrator)
- Buddy Complex (2014) (Alessandro Fermi)
- Heavy Object (2015) (Flide)
- Boruto: Naruto Next Generations (2020) (Kaneki)

=== Original video animation (OVA) ===
- Legend of the Galactic Heroes (1989) (Uranff)
- Legend of the Galactic Heroes (1991) (Nilsson)
- Magical Girl Pretty Sammy (1995) (Bif Standard)
- Jungle de Ikou! (1997) (Fuyuhiko)

=== Theatrical animation ===
- Techno Police 21C (1982) (Blader)
- Macross: Do You Remember Love? (1984) (Exsedol 4970)
- Patlabor: The Movie (1989) (Captain Kiichi Goto)
- Patlabor 2: The Movie (1993) (Captain Kiichi Goto)
- WXIII: Patlabor the Movie 3 (2002) (Captain Kiichi Goto)
- Atagoal (2006) (Kara'agemaru)

=== Video games ===
- Inuyasha (2001) (Daija)
- Final Fantasy XII (2006) (Judge Ghis)
- Macross Triangle Frontier (2011) (Exsedol Folmo)
- Shin Megami Tensei: Devil Summoner: Soul Hackers (2012) (Takeo Kitagawa)
- Asura's Wrath (2012) (Emperor Strada)

=== Drama CD ===
- Soul Eater (2005) (Shinigami)

=== Dubbing ===
==== Live-action ====
- The Amityville Horror (Chief of Police (Rich Komenich))
- Behind Enemy Lines II: Axis of Evil (Admiral Henry D (Glenn Morshower))
- Black Book (General Käutner (Christian Berkel))
- The Dark Knight (Gerard Stephens (Keith Szarabajka))
- D-Tox (2006 TV Tokyo edition) (Jack Bennett (Stephen Lang))
- From the Earth to the Moon (Alan Shepard (Ted Levine))
- Happiest Season (Ted (Victor Garber))
- Never Talk to Strangers (Cliff Raddison (Dennis Miller))
- Restoration (King Charles II (Sam Neill))
- Those Magnificent Men in their Flying Machines (1975 NTV edition) (Richard Mays (James Fox))
- Threads (Jimmy Kempf (Reece Dinsdale))
- The Unborn (Gordon Beldon (James Remar))

==== Animation ====
- The Animatrix (Client)
- Romance of the Three Kingdoms (Xun You, Zhang Zhao, Han Sui, and Huang Zhong)
