= Princess Nine =

Japanese sports anime television series

- Princess Nine key visual

プリンセスナイン如月女子高野球部 (Princess Nine Kisaragi Girls High Baseball Club)
- Genre: Sports (Baseball), romance, drama
- Created by: Yasuhito Kikuchi (Note: Credited as Kensei Date.)
- Anime television series
- Directed by: Tomomi Mochizuki
- Produced by: Yasuhito Yamaki
- Written by: Hiro Maruyama
- Music by: Masamichi Amano
- Studio: Phoenix Entertainment
- Licensed by: NA: Nozomi Entertainment
- Original network: NHK-BS2
- Original run: 8 April 1998 – 14 October 1998
- Episodes: 26
- Manga
- Written by: Kensei Date
- Published by: NHK
- Original run: June 1998 – January 1999
- Volumes: 3
- icon

Princess Nine, known in Japan as Princess Nine Kisaragi Girls High Baseball Club (プリンセスナイン如月女子高野球部, Purinsesu Nain Kisaragi Joshikō Yakyū-bu), is a 26-episode Japanese anime television series and a three volume manga written and created by Kensei Date.

== Synopsis ==
The series is about the trials of nine girls at the Kisaragi School for Girls who form a baseball team for the purpose of playing on equal footing with boys' teams at the most prestigious high school tournament in Japan, the National High School Baseball Championship. Their aim to qualify for, and ultimately to win, the final rounds of the tournament which is held each year at the Koshien Stadium. They are led by ace pitcher, Ryo Hayakawa, a daughter of a former pitching star in Japan who was banned from Nippon Professional Baseball.

== Characters ==
=== Main characters ===
The team (in batting order):

1. Seira Morimura (森村 聖良, Morimura Seira), Team #4 and second base: A former school dropout, the red-haired thug had to be tricked by Coach Kido into joining the team. She was a star athlete in track and field, and established records for both the 100 m sprint dash and javelin throw. Consequently, she fits in as the leadoff batter on the team. Seira bats and throws right-handed. Voiced by: Kyoko Hikami (Japanese); Kelli Cousins (English).
2. Hikaru Yoshimoto (吉本 ヒカル, Yoshimoto Hikaru), Team #3 and first base: Hikaru is the energetic first basewoman and switch hitter who was a former softball star recruited to the team. She is originally from Osaka (Kansai) region, which explains her accent. She was the MVP of Junior High School Softball Competition in Kansai. Hikaru throws right-handed. Voiced by: Naomi Nagasawa (Japanese); Cynthia Martinez (English).
3. Koharu Hotta (堀田 小春, Hotta Koharu), Team #8 and center field: The only member of the team with actual baseball experience, Koharu played for a boys' team before being found out as a girl. She grew up on the sea as a daughter of a fisherman, and has developed an extremely powerful swing, dubbed "Wave Motion Swing" from her years of fishing. Her batting is so strong that she occasionally hits out of the park home runs. She is originally from Tosa, a small city on the Shikoku island. Koharu bats and throws right-handed. Voiced by: Akiko Yajima (Japanese); Kira Vincent-Davis (English).
4. Izumi Himuro (氷室 いずみ, Himuro Izumi), Team #5 and third base: Izumi is the daughter of the school's chairperson, Keiko Himuro, and was a star tennis player. However, she cast aside her talent in tennis to become Ryo's rival in baseball. Often caustic and difficult, her only goals pertain to her success. Along with Koharu, Izumi is one of the two strongest batters of the team (she is the team's clean up hitter), forming the primary offensive weapons of Kisaragi Girls' Baseball Team. Izumi bats and throws right-handed. Voiced by: Mami Kingetsu (Japanese); Monica Rial (English).
5. Yuki Azuma (東 ユキ, Azuma Yuki), Team #7 and left field: Yuki is highly mysterious and quiet, possibly not even of this world. Never without her "alien" companion, Fifi, whom she keeps with her at all times, Yuki is nevertheless is a superb fielder who is always in the right place at the right time. Like Hikaru, she was also MVP of the Junior High School Softball Competition in Kansai. Yuki bats and throws right-handed. Voiced by: Ayako Kawasumi (Japanese); Margeaux Baulch (English).
6. Kanako Mita (三田 加奈子, Mita Kanako), Team #6 and shortstop: Kanako is an excellent baseball player and is the daughter of the school's principal who is against the baseball team in the first half. During this, Kanako has to disguise herself as Tami Konaka (小中 多美, Konaka Tami), a pseudonym which is an anagram of her name, to be able to play for the team. She has a kind of geeky attitude, and she wants to be a doctor. But she also likes baseball, and wants to play baseball during her high school years. Kanako was also previously a softball star in junior high, and Hikaru recognizes her from their previous encounters in softball games. Kanako bats and throws right-handed. Voiced by: Rumi Kasahara (Japanese); Aninda Praptiningtyas (English).
7. Yoko Tokashiki (渡嘉敷 陽湖, Tokashiki Yōko), Team #9 and right field: Recruited to fill a hole in the lineup, Yoko has very little athletic ability. Yoko is mostly interested in concentrating on a modeling career, but was looking to use the up-and-coming baseball team as a way to stand out from others. She is originally from Okinawa, the southernmost prefecture in Japan, which explains her tanned skin. She left her hometown, claiming it was to get rid of dozens of boys who wanted to be her boyfriend, and set her heart to a career in modeling. Yoko bats and throws right-handed. Voiced by: Mayumi Iizuka (Japanese); Tiffany Grant (English).
8. Mao Daidoji (大道寺 真央, Daidōji Mao), Team #2 and catcher: Plucked from the judo team, the imposing but incredibly bashful Mao is the only person who can catch Ryo's pitches. An excellent team member when she can overcome her personal shyness. Mao bats and throws right-handed. Voiced by: Kokoro Shindo (Japanese); Shelley Calene-Black (English).
9. Ryo Hayakawa (早川 涼, Hayakawa Ryō), Team #1, pitcher and captain of the Kisaragi Girls' High Baseball Team: Inheriting her father's pitching arm, Ryo has an innate pitching ability. She is a left-handed player just like her father. She originally planned not to go to high school because she wanted to help support her mother at the family's oden shop, but she is recruited to the Kisaragi Girls' High School to be the foundation of the new baseball team. Before playing for Kisaragi, she often played as a relief pitcher for a local sandlot baseball team, the Wildcats. Voiced by: Miki Nagasawa (Japanese); Hilary Haag (English).

All of the team members are excellent athletes and in great physical shape, and this explains why the team becomes such a strong one despite their physical differences. In addition to the nine players, there are two more members:

1. Nene Mori (毛利 寧々, Mōri Nene): Team manager and part-time cheerleader, Nene is a constant bundle of energy, but knows little of the sport of baseball (learning all she knows from sports manga). A perpetual ditz, Nene is constantly interested in any hobby or ability she can discover. She also sometimes acts as a replacement coach, if Coach Kido is absent or late due to hangovers. Voiced by: Taeko Kawata (Japanese); Jennifer K. Earhart (English).
2. Shinsaku Kido (木戸 晋作, Kido Shinsaku): He is a moderately lecherous drunkard who becomes the coach of Kisaragi Girls' High Baseball team. He has connections to both Keiko Himuro and Hidehiko Hayakawa from when they were all younger. In fact, he was Hidehiko's catcher when they were in high school. Despite his very unconvincing and laidback appearance, he is actually quite an observant person, a master strategist and has superior insights and judgements in baseball games. Voiced by: Koji Ishii (Japanese); Andy McAvin (English).

=== Other notable characters ===
- Hiroki Takasugi (高杉 宏樹, Takasugi Hiroki): A star baseball player at the Kisaragi Boys' High School and son of a wealthy family, he was being groomed as a potential boyfriend and possibly fiancé of Izumi. However, Hiroki has an attraction to the spunky Ryo: he calls her "Ganmo-chan" ("Tofu girl" in the English dub) as it is his favorite part of oden. Voiced by: Takehito Koyasu (Japanese); Vic Mignogna (English)
- Shino Hayakawa (早川 志乃, Hayakawa Shino): Ryo's mother, the late Hidehiko's wife and owner/operator of an Oden shop. Her husband died several years ago and Shino and Ryo run the shop themselves now. Shino is highly supportive of Ryo's dreams to play baseball. Voiced by: Sumi Shimamoto (Japanese); Christine Auten (English)
- Keiko Himuro (氷室 桂子, Himuro Keiko): Keiko is the cold and seemingly aloof President of the school and mother to Izumi. Solid in her ambitions, she forgoes seemingly everything to accomplish her plans. Her stated motivation behind the creation of the girls' baseball team is to see the pitching ability Ryo inherited from her father on the mound at Koshien Stadium. Voiced by: Yoshiko Sakakibara (Japanese); Kelly Manison (English)
- Hidehiko Hayakawa (早川 英彦, Hayakawa Hidehiko): Ryo's late father and Shino's late husband. A left-handed, rising star pitcher in baseball many years ago, but he was banned from playing baseball for life because of a scandal he was caught up in (but had nothing to do with). He won the National High School Baseball Championship at Koshien a long time ago, and during his short stint as a pro baseball player, he won the Japan Series with the Towa Jaguars three times in a row before he was banned from baseball. He is famous for inventing and throwing the legendary Lightning Ball, an extremely powerful pitch which has struck out a lot of professional baseball players. Ryo later rediscovered the Lightning Ball with the hints from coach Kido, and she uses it as her ultimate weapon in her baseball games. Voiced by: Kazuhiko Inoue (Japanese); John Gremillion (English)
- Seishiro Natsume (夏目 誠四郎, Natsume Seishirō): Ryo's best friend since kindergarten, and a total genius in high school. He had a crush on Ryo, but could never express it. At the end of the series, he finds himself falling for Hikaru, and she with him, even receiving his first kiss from her. Voiced by: Tetsuya Iwanaga (Japanese); Chris Patton (English)

== Release ==
The series was produced by Phoenix Entertainment, and aired from April 8 to October 14, 1998, on NHK. The series was initially released by ADV Films in North America, who released it in six VHS and DVD volumes. The show is listed on Animeondvd.com as a recommended series. At Anime Expo 2013, Right Stuf Inc. had announced that they have licensed the series for a 2014 release under their Lucky Penny label. Funimation is streaming the series on their website in partnership with Nozomi.

== Episode list ==
No.	Title	Original release date
1	"Hayakawa Ryo, Age 15!" "Watashi Hayakawa Ryō, Jūgo-sai!" (わたし早川涼、15歳！)	April 8, 1998
As Ryo Hayakawa arrives home from school, the local baseball team begs her to finish pitching their game. Later that night, after Ryo soundly defeats the opposing batters, two men visit her mother's Oden bar and challenge her to strike them out. A drunkard volunteers to umpire. After Ryo has struck the first man out and is working on the second, high school baseball star Hiroki Takasugi walks by and offers to finish up the challenge. Although he manages to hit her pitch, the effort breaks his bat and Ryo gets him out by catching the ball. Hiroki is impressed that she is the first person to break his bat and he carries her home, introducing himself to her mother as her new boyfriend.
2	"A Baseball Team at a Prestigious Girls' School?" "Meimon Joshikō ni Yakyū-bu ga?" (名門女子高に野球部が？)	April 15, 1998
The chairwoman at the Kisaragi School for Girls has determined that there will be a girls' baseball team and that they will go to Koshien within three years. Ryo is offered one of the scholarships issued to build this team. When she visits for her interview, she spots Hiroki on campus and he walks her to the Administrative Building. During the walk they pass by the tennis courts where school tennis star Izumi Himuro, the chairwoman's daughter, is practicing. Izumi is troubled by seeing Hiroki with Ryo and treats her coolly.
3	"In My Father's Footsteps" "Otōsan ga Tatta Maundo e" (お父さんが立ったマウンドへ)	April 22, 1998
Ryo is accepted into Kisaragi School but worried about leaving her mother to run the Oden bar by herself. After being reassured, Ryo decides to accept. Her mother decides to show Ryo her father's baseball uniform that he wore when they won at Koshien. Ryo never knew that her father played baseball. Meanwhile, the board at the Kisaragi school are having a hard time accepting Chairwoman Keiko's proposal of having a girls' baseball team. However, she has already hired a coach who happens to be the man who umpired the pitching challenge earlier. At the tennis courts, Izumi offers to play Ryo at tennis, and Ryo manages to return one of the star's serves, even though it goes slightly out of bounds. The coach shows up and gets Izumi to try and hit Ryo's pitch, which she does. The challenge ends with both girls feeling as though they lost to the other.
4	"Welcome, Seira!" "Yoroshiku ne, Seira-san" (よろしくね、聖良さん)	April 29, 1998
Coach Kido has been told that one of their recruits, Seira Morimura, has refused to join the team. He discovers that is being rebellious due to her parents going through a divorce. After helping Seira to cope with the situation, she offers to repay him for his kindness. Kido reveals himself to be the coach of the Kisaragi Girls' School baseball team and declares that she will be the newest player. She reluctantly agrees.
5	"Wave Motion Swing!" "Aranami Suingu to, Haiketsu!" (荒波スイングと、対決！)	May 6, 1998
Coach Kido goes to the Oden bar and shows Ryo a tape of a baseball player with a famous batting technique called the Wave Motion Swing. The player is revealed to be Hotta Koharu, a girl who was barred from playing after her gender was discovered. Ryo and the coach book a flight to see her, but his hangover causes him to miss the flight. This leaves Ryo to convince Hotta to join the school's team. Hotta is determined to care for her father and continue his fishing business and refuses to leave. Ryo challenges Hotta and throws three strikes in a row, but Hotta makes excuses for her inability to hit them. Finally, her father tells her to stop denying the truth and to follow her love for baseball. Hotta then agrees to join the team.
6	"Catch This!" "Kono Bōru o Uketomete" (このボールを受けとめて)	May 13, 1998
None of the players can catch Ryo's pitches and so a search for a catcher begins. Nene, who had earlier run into a large girl named Mao Daidoji who is on a Judo scholarship, has the idea to recruit her. Meanwhile, Yoko Tokashiki is an attractive girl trying to become an idol star. When she's rejected, she sees the article about the baseball team and sends in her application thinking to use this for recognition. She's gets accepted but must show what she can do before joining. Her good looks gets her in with the coach even though she cannot field a ball at all. Mao shows up and, with heckling from her Judo teammates, catches Ryo's pitch and becomes the next new team member.
7	"We Need You, Izumi!" "Izumi-san, Anata ga Hoshī!" (いずみさん、あなたが欲しい！)	May 27, 1998
With only two more girls needed to complete the team, Ryo asks Izumi to join and is greeted with scorn. Later, Ryo catches a girl watching practice but she runs away before she can talk to her. The girl's name is Kanako Mita and her father is the principal of the school. He wants her to leave sports behind and become a doctor and so he's banned her from sports. She turns up again and Ryo takes her to the locker room where the girls find a way to disguise her so she can play. Izumi finds a locket that belongs to her mother with a picture of man in a baseball uniform inside it.
8	"The Future on the Line" "Yakyū-bu no Unmei o Kakete" (野球部の運命をかけて)	June 3, 1998
Izumi searches for the identity of the mysterious man but gets no answers from her mother's butler or from Coach Kido. Ryo tries again to get her to join the team but she refuses. She drops the locket and Ryo sees it and wonders why Izumi would have an old picture of her father. Izumi confronts her mother and then confronts Ryo. She makes a deal with Ryo that, if Ryo and the girls can get her out, she will join the team. On the other hand, if she can reach first base, the team must be dissolved and Ryo leave school. Ryo agrees and she and Izumi spend the next two days in intensive training. Seeing Izumi's despair, Hiroki helps her in her batting.
9	"Winners & Losers" "Kattamono to Maketamono to" (勝った者と負けた者と)	June 10, 1998
The day of the contest has arrived. Izumi is near defeat but Ryo can't keep thinking about why she hates her so much. She figures that it must have something to do with that picture and decides to throw her last pitch just a little slower. Izumi gets to first and the team is defeated. Later, Izumi is talking to Hiroki and he tells her that Ryo let her win. When she learns that and seeing how her mother feels about the team, she asks her mother not to dissolve it. The sulking Ryo sleeps in late thinking she's been kicked out of school but her teammates meet her downstairs in the bar to give her the good news.
10	"The Kisaragi Nine!" "Kisaragi Nine Tanjō!" (如月ナイン誕生！)	June 17, 1998
The girls are playing against a junior high team but they are still short one player. The coach introduces Nene in a player's uniform so that they can compete. Meanwhile Izumi stews over at the tennis court. The girls jump out to a one run lead but eventually the boys get used to Ryo's pitching and take the lead. Down three runs with Nene's turn to bat and two outs, Izumi shows up and saves the day.
11	"Aim for Koshien!" "Watachi-tachi wa Kōshien o Mezasu!" (私たちは甲子園を目指す！)	June 24, 1998
Keiko appeals her case to the board directly so that they may let the girls play but is refused again. An older man – the same man that Ryo helped earlier and the grandfather of Hiroki – walks in and suggests some form of compromise. They agree to let the girls play only if they can prove that they are good enough to compete with boys. They agree that a win against Rinkai High, a Koshien regular, will do. Coach Kido walks into the Oden bar to tell Hidehiko's shrine about their win and Ryo learns that the coach once knew her father and also about an "incident" that neither he nor her mother are willing to talk about. The team begins practice harder than ever to prepare for the big game. Izumi begins to learn how to field the ball and Yoko still doesn't care. Mao cannot catch Ryo's fastest pitches yet either.
12	"One Hundred Pitches" "Namida no 100-Renpatsu" (涙の100連発)	July 1, 1998
In order to get Rinkai High to play them, Keiko told the papers that they must be afraid of their pitcher's magic ball. Rinkai High accepts in order to save face. When Ryo finds out about this, she confronts the chairwoman and then Coach Kido. He promises to tell her about the magic ball if she'll dig a garden for him. She manages to get the garden ready but the coach doesn't tell her about the magic ball. Meanwhile, Mao is having trouble catching Ryo's pitches and Izumi tells her that, if she cannot catch one in a hundred if Ryo's fastest pitches, she should quit the team.
13	"The Girl Stratagem" "On'nanoko Sakusen Kaishi!" (オンナのコ作戦開始！)	July 8, 1998
The day of the game has arrived. In order to get an advantage over the other team, the girls use their femininity to get to a quick lead. This doesn't work for long though and the girls slowly begin to lose the lead.
14	"Lightning Ball" "Maboroshi no Inazuma Bōru" (幻のイナズマボール)	July 15, 1998
Ryo is losing confidence in herself but her teammates continue to do their part in the field. They manage to score once more taking a one run lead but Ryo is getting tired. Ryo, on the mound, remembers Coach Kido telling her how her father would through harder in the end than in the beginning and she begins to learn the secret behind the lightning ball.
15	"Scandal" "Otō-san no Sukyandaru" (お父さんのスキャンダル)	July 22, 1998
With the notoriety of the girls' win, a report digs up information on Ryo's father which begins a scandal. Ryo finds out that her father was kicked out of baseball for allegedly taking money to throw a game. She's having a hard time with this news and also with the fact that her father could have done something like this when she's always thought the world of him.
16	"Exile" "Sayonara, Yagyū-bu" (さよなら、野球部)	July 29, 1998
Ryo knows that she is to be expelled and the team dissolved and so she heads out to her father's hometown. There she sees some kids playing ball and talking about the lightning ball. The man that runs the orphanage tells her about the famous baseball player that used to visit there and teach the kids baseball, of which he was one. He tells her that the man he knew would never throw a game for money and that he always believed in him. Ryo calls home and tells them where she is and decides to spend the night before heading home. That evening two of the kids are trapped in the rain and Ryo goes to help them. They are on a patch of land in the middle of a flooding river so Ryo helps them out at the cost of being seriously injured.
17	"Visions" "Yume" (夢...)	August 5, 1998
Hiroki arrives at the orphanage but learns that Ryo is hospitalized after she rescued the kids. Coach Kido and Ryo's mother arrive to wait out the night with Ryo. The girls on the team, who were helping at the Oden Bar, get together with Nene and head to the hospital as well. Izumi can't be reached as she is brooding in a movie theater over how Ryo is a loser and not fit to be her rival. She finally breaks down and heads to the town where Ryo is. She finds out about her being in the hospital but is forced to walk there, as the taxi is unable to make it in time due to blocked roads. Ryo's condition worsens and she has a dream about her father where they talk about the incident that got him kicked out of baseball. Izumi finally arrives and yells at Ryo to wake up. Ryo hears, and with her vision father's urging, awakens.
18	"The Gift" "Kanano no Bāsudē Puresento" (加奈子のバースデー・プレゼント)	August 12, 1998
The Parents' Association has been calling for the baseball team to be dissolved and Principal Mita agrees. However, news of the heroic deeds done by Ryo and the unknown fact that her father used to also visit the orphanage soon reaches the parents. This causes many of the parents to withdraw from dissolving the team. Having been told that she can ask for anything for her 16th birthday, she requests that her father not dissolve the team, even if she does not get to play. At the general meeting, Mita announces that he will be withdrawing the motion to dissolve the baseball team and Ryo's expulsion.
19	"Hearts & Diamonds" "Itsuwarenai Omoi" (偽れない想い)	August 19, 1998
Coach Kido announces that he has decided to make Ryo the team captain. She learns that Hiroki's birthday is coming up and decides to make him a present. Meanwhile, Hikaru finds Seishiro drawing pictures of Ryo. He wants to use her as a model but is afraid to ask and so Hikaru tells him to go for it. Ryo laughs at him when he tells her thinking that he should use another of the girls on the team that is better looking like Toko or Seira. She gives Hiroki his present. Hiroki sneaks out with Izumi and they have their annual birthday picnic together where she tries to tell Hiroki that she wants him to think of her as more than just a "little sister". When they walk home, he opens Ryo's present in front of her and, when he reads the note, he runs off. He finds Ryo and, after a discussion, tells her that he has feelings for her. He gives her his junior high medal that he's used as a good luck charm.
20	"Back in Training" "Munasawagi no Kyōka Gasshuku" (胸騒ぎの強化合宿)	August 26, 1998
The girls head out to begin their intensive training camp before preliminaries start. Coach Kido has stopped drinking and it is making some of the girls uncomfortable to see him like that. Izumi, the ace batter, is having problems and yet still takes things out on the team and especially Ryo. Izumi later tells Ryo that she knows about the medal and Ryo realizes that Izumi must be jealous of her. Izumi calls Hiroki but cannot bring herself to tell him what is wrong. The next day Hiroki arrives in town. At practice Yuki loses her doll Fifi-chan and is horrified.
21	"I Hate You, Takasugi!" "Tagasuki-kun nante, kirai!" (高杉くんなんて、嫌い！)	September 2, 1998
After Izumi's call, Hiroki pays a visit to her to make sure everything is all right. He accidentally drops the handkerchief that Ryo gave him and she picks it up. Yuki is in a bad state after Fifi-chan disappears and becomes more and more distressed. Ryo sees Izumi with Hiroki's handkerchief and Izumi tells her that he belongs to her even though he may stray for a time. Ryo goes looking for Fifi-chan and it begins to rain. Hiroki motions to her to come to a cabin where they dry out. He tries to find out what her feeling for him are and she tells him that she hates him.
22	"You're Not Alone, Yuki!" "Yuki, Hitori janai yo!" (ユキ、ひとりじゃないよ！)	September 9, 1998
Yuki, brooding over her missing Fifi-chan, remembers how she helped to win the championship in junior high only to be ostracized by her teammates. With no friends and parents who don't believe her, she tried to commit suicide. Later, in a depression, she finds Fifi-chan who helped her cope. The girls try to reach her while Izumi threatens to call her mother and have her replaced. As they are talking on the balcony, Izumi hit a line drive which Yuki catches bare handed. This proves she can play and the fact that her teammates won't abandon her brings her out of her new depression. A bright light appears in the sky and everyone is amazed. It appears that Fifi-chan has gone home.
23	"Beauties vs, the Beasts" "Bijo to Yajū no Taiketsu" (美女と野獣の対決)	September 16, 1998
The Kisaragi Girls have drawn a dirty-playing team for their first game. They have trouble with their dirty techniques but the girls are able to use their superior playing abilities to pull out a victory.
24	"The Kiss" (Kiss...)	September 30, 1998
The Kisaragi Girls are beating everyone they come up against. Hiroki's grandfather comes to the Oden bar and talks to Ryo. She decides that she'll call Hiroki and he asks her to meet him at the field where they first met. She waits but Izumi has found Hiroki first and tells him about her feelings. He tells her that he likes Ryo now and she asks for a goodbye kiss. Unfortunately, Ryo sees the kiss while walking back home, and assumes the worst.
25	"Field of Broken Dreams" "Unmei no Junkesshō" (運命の準決勝)	October 7, 1998
It has come down to the semi-finals and it's the Kisaragi girls' team against the boys' team. Ryo is having problems focusing after seeing Hiroki and Izumi kiss. Meanwhile Koharu gets a call that her father has collapsed but is okay in the hospital. The team arrives to play ball. During the game Ryo decides to walk Hiroki each time to everyone's amazement. With poor batting and pitching, the teams gets down 5 to 0 in the ninth inning.
26	"Shine, Princess Nine!" "Kagayake! Purinsesu Nain" (輝け！プリンセスナイン)	October 14, 1998
With two outs and the bases loaded at the top of the ninth inning, it's Koharu's bat. Before she goes out Nene shows her a fax from her father that has the Kanji for Wind on it. She hits a grand slam and then she's followed by a solo home run by Izumi to tie the game. Yuki gets struck out and now it's time for Ryo to face Hiroki. Before they take the field Izumi, frustrated that Ryo isn't giving her all, slaps her across the face and tells her that the kiss was a goodbye kiss and that she concedes losing to her in that but she will not let her rival mess up the ball game. Ryo, exhausted goes out to face Hiroki without walking him this time. When she falls to the ground, he yells at her that he cannot believe that she will show her love to him by not competing to her fullest. She gets up and throws a couple of lightning balls to finish the game but the Kisaragi club ends up falling short 6-5 at the bottom of the ninth inning.

== See also ==
These are titles with a similar theme of women's baseball:

- Cinderella Nine
- Taisho Baseball Girls
- Tamayomi
