= Sasami: Magical Girls Club =

Japanese manga and anime

砂沙美☆魔法少女クラブ (Sasami: Mahō Shōjo Kurabu)
- Genre: Magical girl
- Created by: AIC; BeSTACK
- Manga
- Written by: Akimasa Mda
- Published by: Fujimi Shobo
- Magazine: Monthly Dragon Age
- Original run: December 9, 2005 – April 8, 2006
- Volumes: 1
- Anime television series
- Directed by: Yoshihiro Takamoto
- Produced by: Toshio Nakatani; Yasuo Ueda
- Written by: Mari Okada
- Music by: Akifumi Tada
- Studio: AIC Spirits
- Licensed by: US: Crunchyroll
- Original network: WOWOW
- English network: US: Funimation Channel
- Original run: April 13, 2006 – January 11, 2007
- Episodes: 26
- Related series
- 1. Magical Girl Pretty Sammy; 2. Magical Project S

Sasami: Magical Girls Club (砂沙美☆魔法少女クラブ, Sasami: Mahō Shōjo Kurabu) is a magical girl anime which features the rather familiar likenesses of Sasami and other characters of the Tenchi Muyo! franchise, specifically those of Pretty Sammy. However, this series is not in the same continuity as the Pretty Sammy anime titles. The animation style is different, and the story is set in an alternate universe.

Produced by BeSTACK, animated by AIC Spirits and officially recognized as a Tenchi Muyo! spin-off, it was aired in Wowow on Thursday nights, the show aired its first season from April 13 to July 13, 2006.

On October 6, 2006, a second season had begun airing. Both seasons have now been licensed for a release in the U.S. by Funimation.

On January 12, 2009, the series made its North American debut on the Funimation Channel.

== Story ==
Sasami Iwakura has been endowed with magical powers since birth, but at age three, she is forbidden by her parents to use them. So she decides to keep her magical powers a secret. But at the start of a new term, she encounters the new transfer teacher, Washu, and her pet Ryo-Ohki, and her life is about to change.

The first series/season is dedicated to character development, as we are introduced to magic girls Sasami, Misao, Makoto, Tsukasa, and Anri. As the girls discover their awakening powers, they also learn a bit about themselves as they train with Washu and Daimon as part of their "cooking club." This culminates in their taking a trip to the magic world, where they compete against other magic squad teams, some having boys in them.

The second series/season is dedicated to the plot, where Sasami's magic girl squad's activities have impressed the Chief Sorceress. As such, she wants those girls as part of her plan to change the human world (Earth), which she sees as too corrupt. The girls, especially Misao, must not only learn to master their abilities and magic, but also learn to face their own fears, lack of understanding, and the like as they walk down a dark road set down before them by the Chief Sorceress.

This anime also features Misao (Shinohara) and Sasami's homeroom teacher Mihoshi.

== Characters ==
=== Magical Girls Club ===
Sasami Iwakura (岩倉 砂沙美, Iwakura Sasami)

Voiced by: Mana Ogawa (Japanese); Alison Viktorin (English)

Sasami is the lead character of the series. She is a bubbly girl who has magical powers which she uses only in secret because she is forbidden by her parents to use them. It is only when her cooking teacher Washu, discovered her magical powers that they are to be of use. Her default powers of magic are the ability to move things around, with the members saying that it is mostly useless at times. However, she possesses the ability of light, one of the most sacred and rare magic known. Only when Sasami loses control can she activate this move. Except for the absence of freckles and the triangular mark on her forehead, she looks similar to her metaseries counterpart. She has feelings for Amitav.
Misao Shinohara (篠原 美紗緒, Shinohara Misao)

Voiced by: Himeko Shimura (Japanese); Monica Rial (English)

Misao is the shy classmate of Sasami and they become friends in the first episode. She is an introvert whose shyness manifests as worm-like creatures around her whenever she gets scared. They also envelop her body, making her scary to those around her. When Sasami is around with her, she can speak freely with confidence, but without Sasami in her view, she reverts to her shy self. Misao has a crush on Monta, but because she is so shy, she can't seem to tell her feelings for him. Except for the white bow on her head and her hair being more blue rather than purplish black, she resembles her counterpart in the Magical Girl Pretty Sammy series, Misao Amano. Later in the series, her hair ends up being cut, becoming shorter than shoulder-length.
Makoto Hozumi (穂積 真琴, Hozumi Makoto)

Voiced by: Momoko Hatano (Japanese); Cherami Leigh (English)

Makoto is the petite, noisy third member of the club; she has the ability to gravity manipulation, she can enlarge or shrink herself at will. In one episode, it is because of this (and her short stature) that she drinks up the school's entire supply of milk and eventually goes to the restroom. Her personality is generally a bit bossy and hot-headed, sometimes acting as the serious one of the group.
Tsukasa Takamine (高峰 司, Takamine Tsukasa)

Voiced by: Saharu Kawakami (Japanese); Brina Palencia (English)

Tsukasa comes off as a relatively emotionless girl with pink hair. She has the ability to use and manipulate the wind. She has an overprotective father who does not want her to use her powers after her mother dies, but he eventually lets go of that trait, knowing the powers she has are a reminder of her mother.
Anri Misugi (美杉 杏莉, Misugi Anri)

Voiced by: Marin Funayama (Japanese); Brittney Karbowski (English)

Anri is the fifth member of the club. She has the ability to transform her drawings and writings into tangible symbols on her notepad. Although she acts like a princess, she actually comes from a rather large family with a lot of siblings. Anri has a strong infatuation with Tsukasa and lavishes words of love and flattery on her constantly.
Washu Kozuka (小塚 鷲羽, Kozuka Washū)

Voiced by: Akiko Hiramatsu (Japanese); Luci Christian (English)

Washu is the cooking teacher and adviser of the magical girls' club (and cooking club). Although she is recruited by the school, she is in fact from the world of the witches. As an adviser, she trains the girls to be good magical girls. Ironically, although she is the cooking teacher, she herself cannot cook. She has seemed to cause a lot of trouble in the past, as shown in a flashback. She is based on Washu Hakubi from the Tenchi Muyo! Franchise. Despite being from the world of the witches, she is a normal human. People like her are labeled "Story Tellers".

=== Supporting characters ===
Ryo-Ohki

Voiced by: Ema Kogure (Japanese); Z. Charles Bolton (English)

Ryo-Ohki is Washu's pet 'cabbit' (combination of cat and rabbit). Washu treats Ryo-Ohki with abuse. This probably is the reason it eventually ends up with Sasami, much like its counterpart. Although its gender is not known, it can change its form, like its counterparts do. It also makes noises that often sound like laughter. Its name is pronounced "Roy-Ohki" in the English dub, or "Royo" for short. Ryo-Ohki is a regular character in the Tenchi Muyo! franchise.
Mihoshi (美星先生, Mihoshi-sensei)

Voiced by: Hyo-sei (Japanese); Colleen Clinkenbeard (English)

Mihoshi is Sasami and Misao's homeroom teacher. Just like her counterpart in the Tenchi franchise, she is clumsy and goofs up a lot.
Daimon (大門)

Voiced by: Masakazu Suzuki (Japanese); Mike McFarland (English)

Daimon is the school's custodian/groundskeeper, but he is also from the world of the witches. He is Washu's boss, but Washu seems to order him around more. He is kind and caring and really is strategic, he is almost always calm and very few times seen him opening his eyes, which are colored green. His home on the school grounds, and in his closet is a passage to underground where the Magical Girls club hold their practices, and there is also a gateway to the world of the witches that can be activated by Ryo-Ohki.
Ginji Iwakura (岩倉 銀次, Iwakura Ginji)

Voiced by: Kenji Hamada (Japanese); Sonny Strait (English)

Sasami's father is a children's novelist. He forbids Sasami from doing activities that involve magic or traveling to the magical world. Later in the series, it is revealed that he is from the magical world, and has a rank higher than Washu and Daimon. Although he is human, he can perform magic, much to Daimon and Washu's surprise. He is capable of teleportation, and telekinesis, which glow bright green. He is named after his counterpart in the Magical Girl Pretty Sammy and Magical Project S series.
Honoka Iwakura (岩倉 ほのか, Iwakura Honoka)
Voiced by: Ruri Asano (Japanese); Amber Cotton (English)
Sasami's mother. Though she barely knows what is going on, she is a good mother. She is named after Sasami Kawai's mom in Magical Project S
Monta (もんた)

Voiced by: Yuka Nishigaki (Japanese); Todd Haberkorn (English)

Sasami's classmate who has feelings for her. Sasami does not know this; rather it is Misao who has feelings for him. He discovered the girl's magical powers before the tournament and is quite frightened of it. His real name is Toshihiko Saruta (猿田 寿彦, Saruta Toshihiko).
Kozue Matsubara (松原 梢, Matsubara Kozue) and Chiaki Miyazawa (宮沢 千晶, Miyazawa Chiaki)

Kozue Matsubara Voiced by: Aimi Yanagi (Japanese); Majken Bullard (English)
Chiaki Miyazawa Voiced by: Natsuki Matsuzaki (Japanese); Kate Oxley (English)

Sasami's friends. Kozue is the girl wearing glasses with short brown hair, and Chiaki the taller blonde girl.
Itoki (衣斗紀)

Voiced by: Mai Kadowaki (Japanese); Carrie Savage (English)

Itoki is from the world of the witches, and she visits Washu and the girls every so often to bring messages. She does not get along with Washu very well and is infatuated with Daimon, though his exact feelings for her are somewhat ambiguous. Washu considers Itoki a rival. Her magical ability is controlling water, as she can summon various water dragons wherever there is a source of water.
Amitav (アミターヴ, Amitābu)

Voiced by: Mitsuki Saiga (Japanese); J. Michael Tatum (English)

A strange boy whom Sasami meets at a pond in the magical world and teaches her the magical girls' song which Sasami memorizes very well. Sasami calls him Ami-chan (アミちゃん, Ami-chan) and has romantic feelings for him. He says he has three names which he has trouble remembering, and the first name given to him happens to be very long. It is also possible that he returns Sasami's feelings.
Ayane Kijima (木島 綾音, Kijima Ayane)

Voiced by: Yū Kobayashi (Japanese); Trina Nishimura (English)

She is the leader of the "Shining Star" magical girl team. Misao looks at Ayane as a mentor. Ayane is supposed the strongest witch of all, second to Chief Sorceress.
Chief Sorceress (巫女長, Chief Sorceress)

Voiced by: Kei Kobayashi (Japanese); Caitlin Glass (English)

She is the leader of the magic world and the main antagonist of the series. Her beliefs about how the corrupt human world needs to be led by witches leads her to enact an ambitious plan which involves the magic girls from Earth, especially Sasami's group. Chief Sorceress is never addressed by name, only by title.

== Music ==
- Opening: Sweet MAGIC (performed by Magical Sweets)
- Ending: Kirakira Days (Sparkle-Sparkle Days) (performed by Magical Sweets) (Season 1)
- Ending: Yuyake No Solitude (Sunset Of Solitude) (performed by Magical Sweets) (Season 2)

The opening and end themes were dubbed into English for Funimation's release of the series. The opening theme was performed by Lauren-Claire Poitevent while the closing themes were performed by Laura Wetsel.

The official anime soundtrack was released on CD in 2006 and includes the following tracks:

- 01. Sweet MAGIC(TV size)
- 02. Determination (決意)
- 03. Chosen Girls (選ばれし少女たち)
- 04. The Approaching Wave( 迫りくる波動)
- 05. Witch Tower (魔女の塔)
- 06. Love Potion (愛の薬)
- 07. A Witch Is... (魔女は)
- 08. Magic Lesson (魔法のレッスン)
- 09. A Rising Negative Emotion (よみがえる負の感情)
- 10. Dark Sphere (暗黒の球体)
- 11. Happakappa ☆ SHUFFLE!
- 12. Solitude of Sunset (夕焼けのソリチュード) Instrumental ver.
- 13. Sudden Appearance (突然の出現)
- 14. Earth Song (大地の歌) Harp ver.
- 15. Run Away! (逃げる)
- 16. Sasami's Theme (笹見の歌)
- 17. Awakening of Destiny (運命の目覚め)
- 18. For Love (愛のために)
- 19. That's Hard Work (それは 大変)
- 20. Solitude of Sunset (full size)

== Reception ==
Casey Brienza of Anime News Network reviewed the anime's first season, calling it an "inoffensive magical girl anime" and that the show's visuals are appealing, praised the show's character designs, and voice acting. However, Bieza criticized the show for "An-An's puppy love infatuation with Tsukasa" saying it goes nowhere and is annoying, and called the soundtrack a "mixed bag."
