= Debutante Detective Corps =

Japanese anime OVA

お嬢様捜査網 (Ojōsama Sōsamō)
- Genre: School life, comedy, action
- Created by: Aizu Wakamatsu
- Original video animation
- Directed by: Akiyuki Shinbo
- Produced by: Yūji Takase; Takeshi Anzai; Hideki Kama
- Written by: Jūzō Mutsuki
- Music by: Takefumi Haketa
- Studio: Daume
- Licensed by: ADV Films
- Released: April 1, 1996
- Runtime: 31 minutes

Debutante Detective Corps (Japanese: お嬢様捜査網, Hepburn: Ojōsama Sōsamō) is an anime OVA, and was released on VHS and DVD in North America by ADV Films. The OVA was animated by Daume and was produced by Marcus Company.

== Synopsis ==
Five wealthy girls, each with a special talent, have been targeted for assassination by a mysterious person. While enrolling in the Seika School for Girls, a group of mercenaries have begun their attack on the girls. Kimiko Ayanokouji, her twin sister Miyuki and their friends, Youko, Reika and Nina must find a way to survive, fight back against the bad guys and get to the bottom of who wants them dead.

=== Main characters ===
Kimiko Ayanokouji (綾小路 公子, Ayanokōji Kimiko)
Voiced by Shiho Niiyama (Japanese), Dara Aylor (English)
Kimiko is the leader of the Debutante Detective Corps. She's very aloof, considers herself beautiful and has an IQ of 200. Kimiko's special talent is ESP, of which Miyuki claims is made up.
Miyuki Ayanokouji (綾小路 美幸, Ayanokōji Miyuki)
Voiced by Yūko Nagashima (Japanese), Shana McClendon (English)
Miyuki is Kimiko's younger twin sister. Unlike Kimiko, Miyuki is easily tempered, especially by Kimiko's antics. Her specialty is mechanics and electronics and is an expert hacker.
Youko Ryuuzaki (竜崎 陽子, Ryūzaki Yōko)
Voiced by Natsumi Yanase (Japanese), Missy Atwood (English)
Youko is a glasses girl who rides around in a limousine. Her unique talent is to disguise herself into anyone regardless of age, gender or nationality. In addition, she can mimic anyone's voice by memory.
Reika Shu (周 麗華, Shū Reika)
Voiced by Sakura Tange (Japanese), Larissa Wolcott (English)
Reika is born in Hong Kong from a wealthy merchant family. Her training with the Triads has developed her martial arts talent, and thus becoming the Debutantes' personal muscle.
Nina Kirov (ニーナ・キーロフ, Nīna Kīrofu)
Voiced by Rumi Kasahara (Japanese), Lindsay Doleshal (English)
Nina is born in New York City, but is a descendant of Russian Romanov bloodline. She loves everything about the military and is a talented marksman with any gun.

=== Supporting characters ===
Principal (校長先生, Kōchō-sensei)
Voiced by Yukikasa Kishino (Japanese), David Kroll (English)
He runs the Seika School for Girls and gets word of the assassination attempt of the Debutante Detective Corps from the police.
Inspector Daichi (大地警部補, Daichi Keibuho)
Voiced by Takeshi Aono (Japanese), Michael Dalmon (English)
Daichi is the Assistant Inspector assigned by the Commissioner to protect the Debutante Detective Corps ever since the video threat was released. He's a balding husky old man who takes his business seriously.
Detective Nomura (野村刑事, Nomura Keiji)
Voiced by Tōru Furuya (Japanese), Joseph Anthony (English)
Nomura is Daichi's assistant in the criminal case regarding the Debutante Detective Corps. He's a man in glasses and very shy and nervous when it comes to girls, more specifically Kimiko, who loves to flirt with him.
Commissioner (警総監, Keisōkan)
Voiced by Charles Campbell (English)
He assigned Daichi and Nomura to protect the Debutante Detective Corps from those that threatened them.

=== Antagonists ===
Col. Kartz (カーツ, Kātsu)
Voiced by Kazuya Ichijō (Japanese), Gary Dehan (English)
He and two other men were discharged soldiers who became mercenaries for hire. Kartz and his men were imprisoned for their crimes, but somehow managed to escape. Once out, he received orders to kill the Debutante Detective Corps by any means necessary.
Lt. Molicov (モルコフ, Morukofu)
Voiced by Shin-ichiro Miki (Japanese), Joseph Anthony (English)
Molicov is the expert sniper and marksman in Kartz's unit.
Sgt. Martin (マーティン, Mātin)
Voiced by Hisao Egawa (Japanese), Lowell B. Bartholomee (English)
Martin is a giant African-American soldier in Kartz's unit and is extremely skilled in hand-to-hand combat.

=== Others ===
Anchor (アナウンサー, Anaunsā)
Voiced by Chizu Yonemoto (Japanese), Nicole Cavazos (English)
She is the reporter who breaks the news about Col. Kartz's unit's prison breakout, as well as the theft of a military jump jet, of which Kartz used against the Debutantes.
Old Coot (親父, Oyaji)
Voiced by Heimlick Studermeyer (English)
Daughter (娘, Musume)
Voiced by Nicole Cavazos (English)
Limo Driver (運転手, Untenshū)
Voiced by Lowell B. Bartholomee (English)
Geisha (芸者, Geisha)
Voiced by Rebecca L. Cannon (English)

== Music ==
Both the insert theme "Koi no Sōsamō" (恋の捜査網, Love's Dragnet) and ending theme "Koi wa Itsumo Beautiful" (恋はいつもBeautiful, Love is Always Beautiful) were performed by Virgo.

== Reception ==
Anime News Network wrote: "[...] It's not that great visually, the plot is minimal, and it quite willingly dives into every cliche in the book." THEM Anime Reviews summarized: "Great fun if you can appreciate the value of good cheese, but it hasn't aged well due to its self-indulgent plot and low production values." Anime Jump said: "It's frothy, lively, and a hell of a lot of fun. Turn your brain off and enjoy." Gamers' Republic praised the animation quality and the fight scenes and said: "13 year old boys are going to love this series." DVD Talk called the story weak and the animation average.

== See also ==
- Feminist film theory
- Femme fatale
- Girls with guns
- List of female action heroes and villains
