= List of Patlabor characters =

This is a character guide to the manga and anime series Mobile Police Patlabor.

== Original series ==
The officers of the Tokyo Metropolitan Police, Special Vehicles 2 (SV2), Unit 2, taken from the end of The New Files.

=== Section 2 Division 2 ===
Captain Kiichi Gotō (後藤 喜一, Gotō Kiichi)
Voiced by: Ryūsuke Ōbayashi
English voice actors: Michael Schwartz (Central Park Media, TV/OVA), Peter Marinker (Manga, Movies 1–2), Roger C. Smith (Bandai Visual, Movies 1–2), Daran Norris (Geneon, Movie 3)
Section 2 Division 2: Captain of Division 2. Was born in the Taito Ward in Tokyo. He seems quite laid back, even apathetic, but is in fact an extremely capable and politically savvy police officer; supposedly he was assigned to SV2 to keep him away from important events. Goto is often manipulative, especially towards his ragtag subordinates, who he must struggle to keep in line. Has an unrequited crush on Captain Nagumo of the 1st Division, which he pursues throughout the series.
Noa Izumi (泉 野明, Izumi Noa)
Voiced by: Miina Tominaga
English: Elisa Wain (Central Park Media, TV/OVA), Briony Glassco (Manga, Movies 1–2), Julie Ann Taylor (Bandai Visual, Movies 1–2), Michelle Ruff (Geneon, Movie 3)
Section 2 Division 2 Team 1: The bubbly, perky red-headed labor otaku from Hokkaidō. The main character of the show, Noa is usually at the center of the action. Noa loves her Labor like a pet and names it "Alphonse", the same name as her cat and dog once had. Noa is a skilled pilot, and adept at precise movements, but is often overprotective of Alphonse and hates to fire her gun. Since her family runs a liquor store, she can also drink much more than her coworkers and recover from hangovers much faster.
Asuma Shinohara (篠原 遊馬, Shinohara Asuma)
Voiced by: Toshio Furukawa
English: Dan Green (Central Park Media, TV/OVA), David Jarvis (Manga, Movies 1–2), Doug Erholtz (Bandai Visual, Movies 1–2), Richard Cansino (Geneon, Movie 3)
Section 2 Division 2 Team 1: Son of the head of Shinohara Heavy Industries, the company that makes 90% of the labors in the world. After a falling out with his father, Asuma joined the police force and specifically requested to be assigned to the Labor units. Smart, honest to a fault, and sometimes a bit hot-headed, Asuma is a very good officer, although he's often used by Goto as a lackey. Noa and Hiromi's commanding officer in the field, he has a soft spot for the former.
Hiromi Yamazaki (山崎 ひろみ, Yamazaki Hiromi)
Voiced by: Daisuke Gōri
English: Gregory Wolfe (Central Park Media, OVA/TV), Sean Schemmel (Central Park Media, OVA 2), Michael Fitzpatrick (Manga, Movies 1–2), Jason C. Miller (Bandai Visual, Movies 1–2)
Section 2 Division 2 Team 1: A tall, broad man from Okinawa. He is soft spoken and kind-hearted. He wanted to join his father as a fisherman but easily gets seasick. He later joined the police force and eventually made it over to SV2. Yamazaki's too large to fit in a Labor cockpit, so he is designated as the carrier driver for Unit 1. When not on duty he tends to SV.2's vegetable garden where his green fingers can be seen. He's extremely strong, as demonstrated in Movie 1 and 2 where Yamazaki mans the massive anti-labor rifle borrowed from the Narashino Parachute Labor team (apparently an M82 anti-material rifle). He shows the same strength in the TV series when he and Ohta fire the Ingram's Revolver pistol without the aid of a Labor, at the Schaft "Griffon".
Isao Ohta (太田 功, Ōta Isao)
Voiced by: Michihiro Ikemizu
English: James Wolfe (Central Park Media, TV/OVA), Martin McDougall (Manga, Movies 1–2), Sam Riegel (Bandai Visual, Movies 1–2), Richard Epcar (Geneon, Movie 3)
Section 2 Division 2 Team 2: The gun-loving pilot of Unit 2. With a look and attitude better suited for the Marines than a police force, Ohta is comically gung-ho and expects the rest of Section 2 to perform to his standards. He's very brash and often will charge into a situation without thinking it through. In spite of his loud, obnoxious, and often overconfident personality, Ohta has a strong sense of justice. He is extremely gun-happy, but tends to hit anything other than the target in combat. However, on the firing range where the targets are unmanned and he can remain calm, his accuracy is essentially perfect.
Kanuka Clancy (香貫花・クランシー, Kanuka Kuranshī)
Voiced by: Yō Inoue (TV/OVA/Movies), Yuri Amano (Super Robot Wars)
English: Debora Rabbai (Central Park Media, TV/OVA), Tamsin Hollo (Manga, Movies 1–2), Lisa Enochs (Bandai Visual, Movies 1–2)
NYPD, Section 2 Division 2 Team 2: A temporary member of Section 2, on assignment from the NYPD. Sent to observe a Labor unit with the purpose of helping build one for New York City. Highly capable in all duties. Her piloting skills are better than Ohta's, but she was assigned to backup duty since acclimating the Labor to a temporary officer would be a poor decision. (Also, keeping Ohta in line is not a job for an idiot.) Much like Nagumo, Kanuka is very by-the-book, and comes across as cold and standoffish before settling in with the members of SV2. She was born in Hawaii and loves her grandmother dearly
Takeo Kumagami (熊耳 武緒, Kumagami Takeo)
Voiced by: Keiko Yokozawa (Japanese); Tara Sands (English) (Central Park Media, TV/OVA)
Section 2 Division 2 Team 2: Joined Section 2 shortly after Clancy's tenure ended, she takes Clancy's place as backup to Unit 2. She trained with the Hong Kong Police Force before getting assigned to the Ministry of Foreign Affairs. She was then offered a position with Interpol but ended up choosing the Special Vehicles department to continue her career. She is cool, confident, and a strong martial artist, but easily spooked by the supernatural. She also has a past relationship with Richard Wong that she attempts to keep secret.
Mikiyasu Shinshi (進士 幹泰, Shinshi Mikiyasu)
Voiced by: Issei Futamata
English: Johnny Asch (Central Park Media, TV/OVA 1), Flavio Romeo (Central Park Media, OVA 2), Ron Lepaz (Manga, Movies 1–2), Joey Lotsko (Bandai Visual, Movies 1–2)
Section 2 Division 2 Team 2: The lone married man of SV2. Shinshi comes across as a meek man who can be easily pushed around, but becomes frighteningly angry when people make fun of his relationship or his wife. He is also the best programmer and computer expert in SV2, and helps the engineers learn to use their new technology. Acts as the carrier driver for Unit 2.

==== Section 2 Division 1 ====
Captain Shinobu Nagumo (南雲 しのぶ, Nagumo Shinobu)
Voiced by: Yoshiko Sakakibara
English voice actors: Ami Shukla (Central Park Media, TV/OVA), Sharon Holm (Manga, Movies 1–2), Megan Hollingshead (Bandai Visual, Movies 1–2), Michelle Ruff (Geneon, Movie 3)
Section 2 Division 1: Captain of Division 1. Was born in Setagaya Ward in Tokyo. She is a professional, competent police officer, highly regarded by everyone in the police force - basically the exact opposite of Captain Kiichi Goto. Nagumo is a by-the-book style captain (as opposed to Goto who will often use somewhat unconventional methods to meet a goal); she always keeps her mind on the job and never loses her cool. She is willing to defy her superiors over an order she believes is wrong; that, along with a past relationship with her mentor Tsuge, is why she remains at the SV2 rather than being promoted.
Sergeant Tsutomu Gomioka (五味丘 務, Gomioka Tsutomu)
Voiced by: Akio Ōtsuka (Japanese); Matthew Harrington, Don Puglisi (English)
Section 2 Division 1 Team 2: One of the labor pilots for Section 1, and much like his commanding officer, he's very by the book. A good pilot, although his coworkers in Division 2 seem to have more talent. He only appears in the TV series.

==== Section 2 Mechanics ====
Chief Seitaroh Sakaki (榊 清太郎, Sakaki Seitarō)
Voiced by: Osamu Saka
English: Flavio Romeo (Central Park Media, TV/OVA), Blair Fairman (Manga, Movies 1–2), Jamieson Price (Bandai Visual, Movies 1–2)
Section 2 Mechanics: Leader of the labor mechanics that service SV.2. Gruff and loud, Sakaki doesn't like it when Division 2 brings back their labors in less than perfect condition. Threatens to throw all his mechanics into the sea when they don't perform up to his expectations. Sakaki has been a mechanic for most of his life but admits he finds it difficult to keep up with the ever-advancing march of technology in the world.

Chief Shigeo Shiba (シバ シゲオ, Shiba Shigeo) aka Shige-san (シゲさん)

Voiced by: Shigeru Chiba
English: Curt Gebhart (Central Park Media, TV/OVA), Edward Glen (Manga, Movies 1–2) Peter Doyle (Bandai Visual, Movies 1–2), Ethan Murray (Geneon, Movie 3)
Section 2 Mechanics: Second in command to Sakaki, and eventually replaces him when he retires. A total gearhead, he loves his job—probably a little too much, as he can be very hard to relax when he gets fired up. Shige is good friends with Asuma Shinohara.

=== Minor characters ===
Detective Takahiro Matsui (松井 孝弘, Matsui Takahiro)
Voiced by: Tomomichi Nishimura
English: Matthew Harrington (Central Park Media, TV/OVA), Mac McDougall (Manga, Movies 1-2), George C. Cole (Bandai Visual, Movies 1-2)
Tokyo Metropolitan Police: A calm and cool man, he has quite a deal of respect for Goto which is mutual. He assists with the investigative work when Goto can't do it.
Badrinath Harchand aka Bud
Voiced by: Takuma Gōno (TV), Tomoe Hanba (Super Robot Wars) (Japanese); Jamie McGonnigal (English)
An 12 to 13-year-old boy from India who likes computer games. He pilots the J9 Griffon labor. As a pilot, he is as talented as Noa and considers her to be his rival. He appears in the manga, novels, TV series and the second OVA series.
Richard Wong (リチャード・王, Richādo Wan) / Utsumi (内海)
Voiced by: Hirotaka Suzuoki (Japanese); Michael Sinterniklaas (English) (Central Park Media, TV), Rik Nagel (Central Park Media, OVA 2)
SHAFT Enterprises: A constantly cheerful and amoral man who is the head of one of SHAFT's experimental divisions on Labor development. He was involved in a number of incidents in Hong Kong prior to coming to Japan. (Note: "Shaft" also has the variant spelling of "Schaft", its German form.) He appears in the manga, novels, TV series and the second OVA series.
Kurosaki (黒崎)
Voiced by: Takaya Hashi (Japanese); Flavio Romeo (English) (Central Park Media, TV), Wayne Grayson (Central Park Media, OVA 2)
Richard Wong's right-hand man. He is more serious than Wong. He only appears in the manga, novels, TV series and the second OVA series.

== Patlabor EZY ==
Patlabor EZY is set in 2033. Labors have become largely automated, and the Special Vehicles Section must continue to work as a Labor police force without becoming obsolete.

Towa Kuga (久我十和, Kuga Towa)
Voiced by: Sumire Uesaka
The pilot of Ingram unit 1. Towa is reckless, hot-headed, and loves to charge into situations, which often gets her into trouble. Before being assigned to SV2, she was a Community Safety officer in Tokyo.
Kippei Atori (天鳥桔平, Atori Kippei)
Voiced by: Kikunosuke Toya
Commanding officer for Ingram unit 1, although he's often overpowered by Towa's recklessness. Kippei was torn between joining the Japan Self-Defense Forces or joining the police, but ultimately chose the SV2. Like Noa from the original series, he loves mecha.
Akihiko Hazama (間 昭彦, Hazama Akihiko)
Voiced by: Chikahiro Kobayashi
The pilot of Ingram unit 2. Slightly older than the rest of Division 2's rank-and-file at 29, he was formerly a sergeant in the Community Safety division and aspires to be a captain someday. He is skeptical of new technology, such as Labors piloted by AI.
Saki Hirata (平田紗季, Hirata Saki)
Voiced by: Ami Koshimizu
Commanding officer for Ingram unit 2. She is strict and no-nonsense, but struggles to adapt to situations she hasn't prepared for. She was a high achiever in university but disliked corporate culture, so switched careers to join the SV2.
Yuta Yanai (柳井雄太, Yanai Yuta)
Voiced by: Setsuji Satō
The carrier driver for Ingram unit 1. Although physically strong and skilled in hand-to-hand combat, Yuta prefers cooking and is a devoted Buddhist. He became a police officer after his family's restaurant closed.
Hachikuma Yuzuki (柚木八久万, Yuzuki Hachikuma)
Voiced by: Yume Matsumura
The carrier driver for Ingram unit 2. Like Hiromi from the original series, her height makes her unable to pilot an Ingram. She is a romantic at heart, preferring stories full of love and emotion, and she dreams of owning a home and a pet cat.
Kimika Saeki (佐伯貴美香, Saeki Kimika)
Voiced by: Megumi Hayashibara
Captain of Division 2. She is calm and soft-spoken, but able to think on her feet when the situation calls for it. She would prefer that nothing happens at her job, and is often exasperated by the antics of her subordinates who crave excitement.
