= Shiho Niiyama =

Japanese voice actress (1970–2000)

- 新山 志保
- Born: March 21, 1970; Matsuyama, Ehime, Japan
- Died: February 7, 2000 (aged 29); Shinjuku, Tokyo, Japan
- Occupation: Voice actress
- Years active: 1992–1998
- Agent: Aoni Production
- Height: 163.5 cm (5 ft 4 in)

Shiho Niiyama (新山 志保, Niiyama Shiho; March 21, 1970 – February 7, 2000) was a Japanese voice actress from Matsuyama, Ehime, affiliated with Aoni Production at the time of her death. Niiyama was most known for her roles as Kou Seiya/Sailor Star Fighter in the Pretty Soldier Sailor Moon series, Risa Kanzaki in Neighborhood Story, Suou Takamura in Clamp School Detectives, and Deedlit in Record of Lodoss War: Chronicles of the Heroic Knight. She was also involved in the voice actor group Virgo, who were the voice actresses in the anime and game Ojōsama Sōsamō.

Niiyama was diagnosed with leukemia in 1998 and later underwent a bone marrow transplant on February 7, 2000. At approximately 6:23 A.M., Niiyama suffered a bout of internal bleeding in her lung and died as a result of complications from leukemia. Niiyama was 29 years old at the time of her death. Her final performance was in the TV series Record of Lodoss War: Chronicles of the Heroic Knight as the voice of Deedlit.

== Filmography ==
- Hiroko in Aoki Densetsu Shoot!
- Teppei Kisugi (young), Natsuko Ōzora in Captain Tsubasa J
- Doris in Marmalade Boy
- Risa Kanzaki in Gokinjo Monogatari
- Dealer (ep 12), Judau's mother (ep 23) in Kuso Kagaku Sekai Gulliver Boy
- Seiya Kou/Sailor Star Fighter in Sailor Moon Sailor Stars
- Fuyumi in Sailor Moon SuperS
- Blue delmo Valerie in Agent Aika
- Dorm Chief in Battle Athletes
- Rie Shibusawa in Battle Skipper
- Sakada no Jiisan no Tsuma in Chibi Maruko-chan
- Suou Takamura in CLAMP School Detectives
- Kimiko Ayanokōji in Debutante Detective Corps
- Juai in Detatoko Princess
- Myonsaku Kim in Fatal Fury: The Motion Picture
- Atore in Hakugei: Legend of the Moby Dick
- Mao in Hyper Police (ep 19)
- Announcer A in Nanatsu no Umi no Tico (ep 36)
- Nursery School Teacher in Ogre Slayer
- Rei in Perfect Blue (movie)
- Deedlit in Record of Lodoss War: Chronicles of the Heroic Knight
- Kobachi-chan in Soreike! Anpanman
- Momiji Kagariya in Starship Girl Yamamoto Yohko
- Tachiki's wife in Vampire Princess Miyu (ep 17)
- Hidenori in You're Under Arrest (Ep 46)
- Narrator in BS Tantei Club: Yuki ni Kieta Kako
- Fake Goddess Althena in Lunar 2: Eternal Blue
