= Hibiki Nagai =

Japanese footballer

Hibiki Nagai 長井 響
Personal information
- Date of birth: 29 January 2000 (age 26)
- Place of birth: Ehime, Japan
- Height: 1.76 m (5 ft 9 in)
- Position: Defender

Team information
- Current team: Kochi United
- Number: 23

Youth career
- –2014: Shimizu FC
- 2016–2017: Imabari Higashi High School

College career
Years	Team	Apps	(Gls)
2018–2021	Hiroshima Shudo University		

Senior career*
Years	Team	Apps	(Gls)
2022–2024	Gainare Tottori	23	(0)
2024	→ Okinawa SV (loan)	29	(1)
2025–	Kochi United	0	(0)
- * Club domestic league appearances and goals as of 27 December 2024, 14:10 (UTC)

Hibiki Nagai (長井 響, Nagai Hibiki; born 29 January 2000) is a Japanese footballer who playing as a defender and currently play for J3 League club, Kochi United.

== Club career ==
While studying at the Hiroshima Shudo University, Nagai was announced as a Gainare Tottori player ahead of the 2022 season.

On 9 January 2024, Nagai announce official transfer to JFL club, Okinawa SV on loan for 2024 season. The contracts for both Tottori and Okinawa expired in this year.

On 27 December 2024, Nagai announce official transfer to J3 promoted club, Kochi United from 2025 season.

== Career statistics ==
=== Club ===
As of the start from 2025 season.

Club	Season	League			National Cup		League Cup		Other		Total	
Club	Season	Division	Apps	Goals	Apps	Goals	Apps	Goals	Apps	Goals	Apps	Goals
Gainare Tottori	2022	J3 League	21	0	1	0	—				22	0
Gainare Tottori	2023	J3 League	2	0	0	0	—				2	0
Okinawa SV (loan)	2024	Japan Football League	29	1	1	0	—				30	1
Kochi United	2025	J3 League	0	0	0	0	0	0	—		0	0
Career total			52	1	2	0	0	0	0	0	54	1
