= Magical Project S =

1996 Japanese anime series

- DVD cover for Magical Project S

プリティサミー (Puriti Samī)
- Genre: Comedy, magical girl
- Anime television series
- Directed by: Katsuhito Akiyama
- Written by: Yōsuke Kuroda; Hideyuki Kurata
- Music by: Yoshikazu Suo
- Studio: AIC
- Licensed by: US: Pioneer Entertainment (expired)
- Original network: TV Tokyo
- Original run: 4 October 1996 – 28 March 1997
- Episodes: 26
- Related series
- 1. Magical Girl Pretty Sammy; 2. Sasami: Magical Girls Club

Magical Project S, known in Japan as Pretty Sammy (プリティサミー, Puriti Samī), is a 26-episode anime television series animated by AIC and produced by Pioneer LDC, airing in Japan from October 1996 to March 1997. It is based on the Pretty Sammy character and the OVA series. The series was released in the United States on VHS in 1999 and on DVD in 2002, only in a subtitled format. All instances of the word "sexy" were changed into "lovely" in some episodes.

== Characters ==
=== Main ===
Sasami Kawai (河合 砂沙美, Kawai Sasami) / Pretty Sammy (プリティサミー, Puriti Samī)
Voiced by: Chisa Yokoyama
Based on Sasami Masaki Jurai, Sasami is an ordinary schoolgirl who is given the power to transform into a magical girl, Pretty Sammy. She was also given Ryo-Ohki as her advisor. She uses a magical girl baton.
Misao Amano (天野 美紗緒, Amano Misao) / Pixy Misa (ピクシィミサ, Pikushyi Misa)
Voiced by: Rumi Kasahara
Misao Amano is Sasami's best friend. A kind, soft-spoken, and rather shy girl with dark purple hair, she tends to take a passive role, quietly following and watching the more energetic Sasami. She is transformed into Pixy Misa, a boisterous magical girl villain with blonde hair who wields a paper fan and summons Love-Love Monsters (ラブラブモンスター, Raburabu Monsutā) (monsters of the week) to foil Pretty Sammy's day. She speaks in "weird English"
Ryo-Ohki (魎皇鬼, Ryō-ōki)
Voiced by: Etsuko Kozakura
Ryo-Ohki, the cabbit, serves as Sasami's advisor. In contrast to the counterpart at Tenchi Muyo!, Ryo-Ohki is male, can speak, and can also transform into a boy.
Tsunami (津名魅)
Voiced by: Chisa Yokoyama
Based on her Tenchi Muyo! counterpart, Tsunami is a candidate to be the queen of Juraihelm. After she was chosen, she chose Sasami to act as her representative on Earth. In contrast to her Tenchi Muyo! character, she is not connected or related to Sasami, and she is far more carefree, relaxed, and air-headed.
Ramia (裸魅亜)
Voiced by: Maya Okamoto
Passed over by the council of Juraihelm to be the candidate for Queen, Ramia attempts to undermine Tsunami's bid by having her brother Rumiya transform someone on Earth to be a magical girl villain. She has long red hair.
Rumiya (留魅耶)
Voiced by: Mifuyu Hiiragi
Ramia's little brother. He can transform into a bird that uses hypnosis to transform Misao into magical girl Pixy Misa.

=== Tenchi Muyo! characters ===
Tenchi Muyo! characters that were recast for the TV series include:

- Mihoshi Mizutani (水谷 美星, Mizutani Mihoshi), Sasami's homeroom teacher, based on Mihoshi Kuramitsu
- Kiyone Amayuri (雨百合 清音, Amayuri Kiyone), a teacher at Sasami's school, based on Kiyone Makibi
- Washu Fitzgerald Kobayashi (鷲羽・フィッツジェラルド・小林, Washu Fittsujerarudo Kobayashi), an American child genius who graduated from MIT, and comes to Sasami's school as a science teacher, based on Washu Hakubi
- "Overly Splendid" Oryo (素晴らしすぎるお魎, Subarashi Sugiru Oryō), a bodyguard to Tsunami, based on Ryoko Hakubi
- Romio (露美御), a third candidate for Queen of Juraihelm, based on Ayeka Masaki Jurai

Other Tenchi Muyo! characters have cameos including:

- Tenchi Masaki as a high school kid that Sasami admires
- Genjuro Hagakure, based on Katsuhito Masaki
- Binpachi Hagakure, based on Yosho
- Shinobi Hagakure, based on Achika Masaki
- Nobuyuki Onjigoku, based on Nobuyuki Masaki

=== Supporting characters ===
Ginji Kawai (河合 銀次, Kawai Ginji)
Voiced by: Kazuki Yao
Ginji is Sasami's father in the TV series and seemingly a man of endless talents and abilities. He's an affable man in general, and his love for his wife and daughter is unmatched. Ginji drives Sasami around to places on his motorcycle, even to school. He makes many suave remarks, telling Sasami "good night" in the morning just because he likes the sound of it. Misao finds him a fun person to be around and is a little envious of Sasami getting to be so close with her family.
Ginji often ends up getting involved with helping Pretty Sammy from time to time. Though Ginji has no magical powers, his skills and even his charm often prove useful in many tough situations. In the past, he seems to have been a member of the SWAT team and even has NASA certification for operating a rocket. Sometimes his talents are helpful in combination with Washu's scientific genius, and the two greet each other with "Catherine" and "Johnny" respectively. He also has "Dandy Power", which he used in his fight against the Team Sexy Mrs.
Honoka Kawai (河合 ほのか, Kawai Honoka)
Voiced by: Rie Iwatsubo
Honoka is Sasami's mother in the TV series and like Ginji has a cheerful and overly-nice personality. Her job is running the CD Vision store which is connected to Sasami's houses. However, Honoka sometimes neglects her job to go play video games, which causes CD sales to plummet. At one point, Sasami's parents expect Pretty Sammy to come by and help the store by putting on a show, which made Sasami very nervous.
Konoha Haida (灰田 このは, Haida Konoha)
Voiced by: Tomoko Kawakami
Haida is a mean girl in Sasami's class. She has a crush on Hiroto, constantly doting over him and trying to get his affection in a variety of ways. Hiroto just seems to be annoyed with her, although it is implied that they do start a relationship in the last episode. Konoha also has a dislike of Misao and sometimes says hurtful things to her. In the first episode, she says her goal in life is to conquer the world with her cousin (who clearly resembles Katsuhiko Jinnai from El-Hazard).
In one episode when Sasami loses her baton, Konoha comes across it and is able to transform into the magical girl, Funky Connie (ファンキーコニー, Fankī Konī). The magical baton asks Connie to fight for justice, but she ends up being a failure at it. Instead, Connie ignores all the problems around her and uses it selfishly to get Hiroto to love her. She ends up being extremely disappointed when she finds that the magic can cause Hiroto to love her as Connie but not as Konoha and gives up the baton. Funky Connie's only other appearances are in an episode of the Bonus Theatre where she battles with Love-Me Eimy and a short appearance in the Pretty Sammy Movie trailer.
In five different episodes Konoha is shown with two other mean girls, although they are never named and only speak briefly in one episode.
Eimi Date (伊達 映美, Date Eimi)
Voiced by: Hisoka Moriya
Eimi is a girl who is class rep in Sasami's class. She seems to know the school rules by heart and tries to make sure everyone abides by them. Even in the oddest of situations, and outside of school, she chides people that they are going against "school rules". In the first episode she admits to having dreams of becoming an actress but her voice is shrill, and her singing is later shown to be downright terrible. The class has to keep her quiet when they sing a song together or otherwise she single-handedly ruins it, such as during the School Festival, they first had to tie and gag Eimi during the rehearsal, and then cover Eimi's mouth during the performance.
When Romio arrives on the scene to help Ramia after Pixy Misa's defeat, she takes control of Eimi and causes her to transform into her own champion magical girl, Love-Me Eimy (ラブミィエイミー, Rabu mii Eimī). The monsters she calls are named Lovely Monsters, and she also chides people for breaking school rules like her normal counterpart. She tends to make up rules at her convenience, though, and when she sings her songs (as terrible as her usual self) they are also filled with strange contradictory lyrics. She is nonetheless very powerful and Sammy has to get some help from Oryo (disguised as Cool Red) in order to beat her. Eimi turns to normal again but is unable to transform out of her costume, stuck as a magical girl for the remainder of the series.
Hiroto Majima (真嶋 広人, Majima Hiroto)
Voiced by: Taiki Matsuno
Hiroto is an athletic boy in Sasami's class. Along with his friend Kenji, he is one of the first civilians to see Pretty Sammy in action, and they spread the word around school about the big news about the magical girl. Konoha is infatuated with him, but Hiroto does not care for her, although in the last episode it is implied that they do start a relationship. When she is Connie, Konoha mentions that she had fallen for him when he chased away a bear with his soccer ball in 2nd grade, something that Hiroto doesn't remember happening, though this may only be because he does not remember saving Connie, and only Konoha. He also does not seem to remember who Konoha is while under Connie's spell.
Much to Konoha's dismay, Hiroto has a slight crush on Misao. He provided some help for Misao at academic endeavors, such as getting her ready to jump over the vaulting horse when she was afraid and also covered for her during the dodge ball battle between Mihoshi and Kiyone's classes. Hiroto is quick to notice Misao's change in confidence later in the series. When it is revealed to him that Misao is really Pixy Misa, he is shocked and also a bit frustrated over not being able to help. Konoha chides him over the fact he got so worked up over a girl who might not like him back.
Kenji Oyamada (小山田 健二, Oyamada Kenji)
Voiced by: Daisuke Ishikawa
Kenji is another boy in Sasami's class and a friend of Hiroto. He has squinty eyes and tends to be a comic relief character throughout the series, inserting some kind of joke into the situation. Kenji has an obsession with photographs and often likes to take pictures, particularly of girls in skirts and swimsuits.
Shigeki Amano (天野 茂樹, Amano Shigeki)
Voiced by: Takehiro Murozono
Shigeki is Misao's father. In the TV series he is shown as a pianist that is traveling the world. Shigeki later came back to visit his family and Misao was happy to be able to see her dad. However when Rumiya had Misao forcibly transform into Pixy Misa for the final time, Shigeki found out that the area that Pixy Misa's giant rose which was causing people to go berserk is where his wife and daughter are. Worried for their safety, Shigeki ran into the city and covered his face to avoid breathing in the rose's pollen. When Misao saw him and Kotoe looking for her, it caused her powers as Pixy Misa to weaken and the transformation immediately canceled out. However, Shigeki had to leave before Misao had a chance to see him. But he was able to complete an uncompleted composition that he left for Misao, which also happened to be named Misao.
However, when Misao was going to be performing the song on a piano for her class's performance in the School Festival, Sasami wanted Shigeki to attend so he could watch Misao perform. As Pretty Sammy, she asked Washu for help and Washu used her connections to locate Shigeki. Sasami tried to master Pretty Teleport to teleport to him. When that didn't work, Sasami was able to teleport a letter instead. After being able to see her father after the festival, Misao told him that she wanted to be a pianist just like him.
Kotoe Amano (天野 琴恵, Amano Kotoe)
Voiced by: Miki Itou
Kotoe is Misao's mother and Shigeki's estranged wife. After Shigeki abandoned his family, Kotoe was left in charge of taking care of Misao. Although she seems to be a very busy business woman that is hardly around, she does deeply care about her daughter and works hard to support her.

== Music ==
- Opening and Ending 3 (episode 26): Yume Mireba Yume Mo Yume Ja Nai [A Dream's Not a Dream if You Dream It] (performed by Chisa Yokoyama and Etsuko Kozakura)
- Ending 1 (episodes 1-13): Persona (performed by Kumi Akiyama)
- Ending 2 (episodes 14-25): Chôshi ni Notte Orimashita [I Got Carried Away] (performed by The Rhythm Kings)
- Insert Song 1 (episode 3): Mahô Shôjo Pixy Misa Shôka [Magical Girl Pixy Misa's Song] (performed by Rumi Kasahara)
- Insert Song 2 (episode 5): Pretty Coquettish Bomber (performed by Chisa Yokoyama)
- Insert Song 3 (episode 23): Love-Me Eimy te Yobanaide [Don't Call Me Love-Me Eimy] (performed by Hisoka Moriya)

In episode 1 during the scene where Sasami is about to meet Tsunami for the first time, she is talking to her mother in CD Vision; there is a song playing in the background called "99人の敵" by Etsuko Kozakura, from her 1996 album "それでいいのだ". She voices Ryo-ohki in the series.

== Episodes ==
No.	Title	Original release date
1	"First Contact" "Samī Daichi ni Tatsu!" (サミー大地に立つ!)	4 October 1996
2	"The Crash Course" "Samī Jigoku Tokkun" (サミー地獄特訓!)	11 October 1996
3	"Test! Test! Test!" "Hyaku-ten Totte Sukiyaki!" (100点とってスキヤキ!)	18 October 1996
4	"Jump Over the Top!" "Ano Hako o Tobe" (あの箱を飛べ!)	25 October 1996
5	"Debut! The Star Sammy" "Konseiki Saigo no Aidoru Debyū" (今世紀最後のアイドルデビュー)	1 November 1996
6	"Dodge Ball Battle!" "Yatsu ni Bōru o Mota Seru na!" (奴にボールを持たせるな!)	8 November 1996
7	"Talent for Trouble!" "tensai no sainô" (天災の才能)	15 November 1996
8	"Mid Summer Santa" "manatsu no SANTA" (真夏のサンタ)	22 November 1996
9	"The Island of Love-love Monsters" "RABU RABU MONSUTÂ no shima" (ラブラブモンスターの島)	29 November 1996
10	"East vs. West"	6 December 1996
11	"The Lost Baton" "BATON sôshitsu" (バトン喪失)	13 December 1996
12	"The Blue Sky Rangers" "kokoro wa istumo aozora senta [The Heart is Always With the Blue Sky Rangers]" (心はいつも青空戦隊)	20 December 1996
13	"All I Want is You" "KIMI ga hoshî [I Want You]" (キミが欲しい)	27 December 1996
14	"The Fellow Called Boss" "banchô to yobareta otoko [The Man Who Was Called 'School Gang Leader']" (番長と呼ばれた男)	3 January 1997
15	"Baby Sammy" "akachan SAMÎ de BABÛ [Baby Sammy, Goo Goo!]" (赤ちゃんサミーでバブー)	10 January 1997
16	"The Team, 'Lovely Madams'" "senretsu! hitozumatai [Vividness! The Married Women Squad]" (鮮烈!人妻隊)	17 January 1997
17	"Farewell, The Team, 'Lovely Madams'!" "naku na MISA! saraba hitozumatai [Cry, Misa! Farewell, Married Women Squad]" (泣くなミサ!さらば人妻隊)	24 January 1997
18	"You are the Sunshine Girl" "KIMI wa kôkiatsu shôjo [You're a High-pressure Girl]" (キミは高気圧少女)	31 January 1997
19	"The Magic Fades Away" "bara no hanabira ga maochita toki, shizuka ni mahô wa kieru [When the Rose Petal Falls, the Magic Will Vanish]" (薔薇の花びらが舞落ちた時、静かに魔法は消える)	7 February 1997
20	"Friends" "tomodachi - mitsume au hitomi, tsuna ga reta te - [Friends - Eye to Eye, Hand in Hand]" (ともだち~見つめ合う瞳、繋がれた手~)	14 February 1997
21	"I'm Glad to Have the Mystic Force" "mahô ga atte yokatta [I'm Glad to be Magical]" (魔法があってよかった)	21 February 1997
22	"The Third Magical Girl is Coming!" "mahô shôjo kyôshû [Magical Girl Assault]" (魔法少女強襲)	28 February 1997
23	"Goddess of Destruction" "hagai no megami" (破壊の女神)	7 March 1997
24	"The Moon Must Be Hell!" "tsuki wa jigoku da! [The Moon is Hell!]" (月は地獄だ!)	14 March 1997
25	"New Technology"; NT(ニューテクノロジー)	21 March 1997
26	"Magical Victory" "yattane, taishô! koi mo mahô mo SAMÎ ni omakase [At Last, the Grand Victory! Leave the Love and Magic to Sammy]" (やったね、大勝利!恋も魔法もサミーにおまかせ)	28 March 1997
