= Ayaka Hibiki =

Japanese stage actress and voice actress

Ayaka Hibiki 響 綾香
- Born: Hisoka Moriya (森谷 密); June 8, 1974 (age 51); Tokyo
- Occupations: Actress, voice actress
- Notable credit: Eimi Date in Magical Girl Pretty Samy TV

Hisoka Moriya (森谷 密, Moriya Hisoka; born June 8, 1974), better known by her stage name Ayaka Hibiki (響 綾香, Hibiki Ayaka), is a Japanese stage actress and voice actress. She played the role of Miki Kaoru in the musical adaptation of Revolutionary Girl Utena.

== Filmography ==
- Hiromi Ohara in Kochikame
- Eimi Date / Love-Me Eimy in Magical Girl Pretty Samy TV
- Matsuno in Tenchi in Tokyo
