= Hyper Police =

Manga and anime series

- North American DVD cover of Hyper Police

はいぱーぽりす (Haipā Porisu)
- Genre: Comedy, Sci-fi
- Manga
- Written by: Minoru Tachikawa
- Published by: Kadokawa Shoten
- English publisher: NA: Tokyopop
- Imprint: Dragon Comics
- Magazine: Gekkan Dragon Magazine
- Original run: 1993 – 2004
- Volumes: 10
- Anime television series
- Directed by: Takahiro Omori
- Written by: Sukehiro Tomita
- Music by: Kenji Kawai
- Studio: Studio Pierrot
- Licensed by: NA: Image Entertainment
- Original network: TV Tokyo
- Original run: 3 April 1997 – 25 September 1997
- Episodes: 25

Hyper Police (Japanese: はいぱーぽりす, Hepburn: Haipā Porisu) is a Japanese manga series and written and illustrated by Minoru Tachikawa. It is set in a period in the far future, in which humanity is almost extinct and most of the population are monsters. The series mostly follows the offices of a private police company and focuses on the life of Natsuki Sasahara, a young catgirl, and her co-workers: foxgirl Sakura Bokuseiinmonzeninari, werewolf Batanen Fujioka and his cousin Tomy Fujioka.

The manga was adapted into a 25-episode anime television series animated by Pierrot and directed by Takahiro Omori in 1997.

For many years, the only western language to have official translations of the Hyper Police manga was Spanish. English translations have been completed by US company Tokyopop.

== Setting ==
The anime takes place in the year 22 HC (Holy Century), in the Tokyo ward of Shinjuku. Although theoretically about the competition of rival private police corporations (licensed bounty hunting firms) in an Earth where humanity is in danger of extinction, in actuality it focuses more on the lives of the main characters, such as; Natsuki Sasahara, Sakura Bokuseiinmonzeninari, and Batanen Fujioka. The monsters are usually taken from Japanese mythology, updated for the modern era. In the anime, repeat criminal offenders in Tokyo have their memories wiped. However, in the manga version, they are castrated. Mithril exists in this world/setting; it is a sort of specially enchanted silver that is especially effective against supernatural characters.

== Characters ==
Some of the characters in Hyper Police are hybrids of human and "monsters"; which occurred during the Holy war when the doorway between the human world and the Monster World opened up, thus allowing humans and monsters to co-exist and interbreed.

Natsuki Sasahara
Natsuki is a 17-year-old half-human/half-nekomata. She is the daughter of a human father and a nekomata mother. Natsuki is very sweet and kind to everyone and always eager to help protect the weak and uphold the law. Her personality is very feline; she will eat cat food, grooms herself like a cat, and will play with string and other moving objects (including Sakura's tails). Her favorite drink is catnip-milk, which has an alcoholic effect on her. Batanen hired her to join Police Company when he saw her ability to create electrical shocks being put to good use, while she was inadvertently taken hostage by a criminal he was chasing, then proceeded to fry him to a crisp. However, this is also her major problem, since Natsuki is so young, she still has trouble controlling her powers and has been known to spark at random when frightened, frying everything within several meters of her. She is also a dangerously bad shot with a gun and has shot her allies at least twice by accident, thus she only uses a short dagger as her melee weapon of choice. When angry or scared, her tail temporarily splits in two. She prides herself on owning an orihalcon blade, and is in control of two "parasites", which is unusual for the setting; even having one is considered to be powerful. As of volume nine, it has been revealed that she is the daughter of the Ancient Egyptian goddess Bast.
Note that she has 2 sets of ears, human normal position and feline on the top sides of her head.
Voiced by: Yuko Miyamura
Parasites
These magical familiars are able to focus their owner's magical energy and turn it into electricity. The names of Natsuki's parasites are Fujin and Raijin (named after the Japanese gods of wind and thunder). Sakura has one too, but it is rarely seen. In the manga, it was revealed in volume seven, that Fujin and Raijin were engagement "rings" from a prince in china, but due to misunderstandings through Natsuki's father's translator, Natsuki was unaware she was engaged.
Bob
Bob is Natsuki's super intelligent pet bobtail cat. He is older than she is, and thus is her legal guardian when her human father is away on his archaeological digs.
Voiced by: Kouichi Toochika
Sakura Bokuseiinmonzeninari
Sakura is a kitsune (fox spirit) and Natsuki's partner for a time. Though she is 191 years old, she claims that she looks to be only 19. She has human ancestors, thus she was born with only 8 and 1/5 tails and was teased as a child, because of it. Kitsune must have a full nine tails in order to have full use of their power, thus Sakura has spent many years hunting for a powerful being to consume, in order to attain that full power. Sakura joins the Police Company after seeing Natsuki in action, in hopes of consuming her, in order to gain her full ninth tail. She can fly, has some minor electrical power and is an excellent shot with a gun. Sakura is from Osaka, thus has a knack for bartering and handling money. Later on she gives birth to three mischievous kids from her mating with the time-displaced samurai Sakunoshin, by episode 17. Justifying the age-old lore of a kitsune being a mother and housewife. It is not completely clarified if the two are officially married or not though, Sakura's mother is seen to ask her at one point "when are you two coming to Osaka to get married?"
Voiced by: Chiyako Shibahara (Japanese); Dorothy Elias-Fahn (English)
Sakunoshin Chikura
Sakunoshin is a displaced samurai from Japan's Tenshō era, who ended up in the Holy Era due to Natsuki's power surges that unbeknownst to her have been opening up temporary time portals in various parts of the city. When he first arrives, he mistakes Sakura for his love, ninja Kasumi. Later, when he realizes that Sakura is not Kasumi, he falls in love with her. It is revealed in the anime that Kasumi may be Sakura's direct ancestor. Sakunoshin is very calm and even tempered, though in battle he becomes extremely fierce and deadly, and is able to best even experienced monster fighters. He has an entire kit of samurai armor, along with his katana, equipment, and a set of Japanese smoking pipes (only seen in the manga). In the manga, Sakunoshin is often apprehensive of his wife's romantic advances, as they humorously leave him extremely exhausted. Still, he loves her very much and sets out on an epic journey in search of a cure, when Sakura is affected by magic weapons in later issues. Being human, he and his family are awarded food, clothing and housing from the government.
Sakunoshin is a very skilled swordsman and to her horror, has even sliced through Natsuki's orihalcon Blade.
Voiced by: Toshihiko Seki
Batanen Fujioka
Batanen is a 35-year-old werewolf, and a senior officer at Police Company, as well as the top earner. He is very protective of Natsuki and often acts as a big brother figure to her. He is secretly in love with her and despite being somewhat of a lecher, Batanen is very shy and unsure of himself when it comes to making a move on Natsuki, thus she is totally unaware of his feelings for her. However, he also seems hesitant to make a move even when (for various reasons) Natsuki is trying to be flirty with him. His abilities are quick regeneration (when injured, he becomes fully healed by the next full moon) and near-immortality, as well as being a competent detective and an excellent shot. In the manga, he is always called by his first name, but in the Japanese version of the anime, most everyone refers to him as "senpai" (senior). At the end of the manga he and Natsuki are married.
Batanen has a large collection of guns in his apartment and is usually portrayed as carrying what looks like a Magnum Research Desert Eagle (only much larger).
Voiced by: Akio Ōtsuka
Tommy Fujioka (Tomy in the manga)
Tommy is Batanen's cousin and partner only a year older than Natsuki. Unlike his cousin Batanen, Tommy has the appearance of an anthropomorphic wolf. Although somewhat naive, he is honest and quite skilled, with his specialty being information gathering. He is very adept at problem solving and is skilled in computer systems and possesses a large knowledge of varying subjects (he has demonstrated he can tell when a katana was made just by looking at it). He later falls in love with the human spirit-summoner Peau and being inexperienced in love, comes on a bit too strong. He apparently has a kink for being servile and tries to get Peau to pander to this. He bought her a pair of scarlet slippers and said "Please take these as a gesture of my feelings and step all over me!" By the end of the series, he marries Peau and they have nineteen offspring.
Tommy carries a rather nondescript gun in the manga, but carries a German Walther P38 in the anime. He is also deeply and madly in love with Peau and is probably the most stable person of the cast.
Voiced by: Ryuuzou Ishino
Samansa Grey (Samantha)
Samansa is an oni with huge Coke-bottle-lens glasses who works as a secretary for Chief Mudagami, even after the company goes bankrupt. She is a computer and information gathering expert, with a talent of predicting the future with her tarot cards. In the manga, she is virtually non-existent until the company goes under, at which point, she reveals herself as a shrewd businesswoman. She is somewhat manipulative and loves money above all else. She founds the Grey Company—a sort of spiritual successor to the Police Company.
Voiced by: Kanako Mitsuhashi
Naoko Kondo
Naoko is one of the few humans in Police Company, she initially hates all non-humans due to the fact that a monster killed her parents when she was a child. Natsuki helps her overcome this hatred when she saved her life, by killing the same monster that killed her parents. She still feels vulnerable when fighting monsters, yet compensates for her lack of supernatural powers by being a crack shot and weapons expert, most likely brought on by her deep desire to avenge the death of her parents. She is much more relevant in the manga then in the anime.
Voiced by: Yumi Hikita
Mudagami
Mudagami is a minor god (immortal, able to teleport, and able to notice changes in the nature of reality). He is the chief of Police Company until it goes bankrupt. He is a small man with long kinky black hair and a thin mustache. He often complains about not being taken seriously and remarks that his wife runs his life.
Voiced by: Naoki Bandou
Nupu
Nupu is an anthropomorphic lion working for Police Company. He is a senior officer at Police Company and Batanen's best friend. He speaks with a British accent in the English version.
Voiced by: Takuma Suzuki
Peau D'Roquefort (Poe D'Roquefort in the manga)
Peau is a water mage working for the state police. She is 24 years old and has a very aloof and impersonal businesslike attitude. The common police robots are under her control and she has the ability to conjure various ice and water spirits (such as waterspouts and trapping suspects in blocks of ice). She too is human, born of European parents. At first Peau is easily disturbed by Tommy's methods of wooing her, yet with time and patience, sometime at the end of volume six. She warms up to the young werewolf and they become friends (the manga has them taking their relationship much further, as Poe has feared being pregnant with Tommy's child by the end of volume eight. In the final volume, they finally get married and have 19 children).
In an important moment towards the end of the manga, Peau comments that without Tommy her heart "would turn to ice." Tommy is responsible for 'melting' her icy exterior.
Voiced by: Yuri Amano
Makoto and Ayami Tachibana
Makoto and Ayami are the husband-and-wife team that run the Lamp (Ranpo) Café. They act as confidants to Natsuki, with Makoto playing the kind, yet concerned businessman and Ayami the sweet generous sister. In the manga, Ayami becomes pregnant around the same time as Sakura, though she doesn't give birth until later on.
Makoto is voiced by Keiji Fujiwara.
Ayami is voiced by Wakana Yamazaki.
Fonne Walkure
Fonne is very different in the manga and anime. She is of European descent and is an officer from the MAD Police Corporation owned by her rich father. In the anime, she is extremely prejudiced against all monsters and is largely an unsympathetic character. She especially goes out of her way to irritate and humiliate the easily provoked Sakura. She comes across as being very cold and cruel in the anime. However, in the manga, she is much more complex. In the anime, at one point Tommy saves her life and as a result, she develops a crush on him, thus, for a short time, competing for his love, with Peau. In the manga, she has a boyfriend named Yoshikawa. And while she is somewhat cold, she is later shown doing charity work at an orphanage for monster children.
She has so far kept her actions within the bounds of the law and carefully watches for one of her "fellow" non-human bounty hunters to cross the line. She pilots an F-Elf class VTOL aircraft. In the anime, she carries, what looks like some sort of truncated lever-action rifle, like a handgun.
Voiced by: Kotono Mitsuishi
Chief Tendo
He is an oni creature with a massive red head that comprises most of his body. He yells, rather than speaks and his whole head bobs up and down when he does so. He works for the Police Company and later the Gray Company in the manga. He likes to cook and knows a lot about preparing fish.
Rai Rai
A character that is only seen in the manga. She appears after the formal formation of the Police company. Initially, she appears to be a catgirl, but she has a short fluffy tail and ears that are larger and droopier then Natsuki's- leading to her possibly being some sort of canine creature. She has platinum blond hair that is very fluffy and sticks out. She has no major skills, but later becomes fast friends with Natsuki- the two of them get their own storyline in volume nine of the manga. She also may be one of the only people who seriously thinks of Natsuki as a superior officer. It is worth noting that an unnamed character who bears a striking resemblance to Rai Rai does make an appearance in episode 23. She has a similar hairstyle, the same ears and even salutes Natsuki as superior officer, as she passes by.
Mao
A cat girl and member of the feline patrol, in episode 19.
Voiced by: Shiho Niiyama
