= Takashi Hibiki =

Japanese scientist (born 1963)

Takashi Hibiki (日引 俊詞, Hibiki Takashi; born 1963) is a Japanese scientist who is a professor emeritus of nuclear engineering at Purdue University and a chair professor of thermal-fluid engineering at City University of Hong Kong.

== Early life and education ==
Hibiki was born in 1963 at Kyoto in Japan. Hibiki graduated from Osaka University in 1985. He obtained his Ph.D. from Department of Chemical Engineering, Osaka University in 1990 under the supervision of Professor Takashi Katayama.

== Career ==
After obtaining his Ph.D., Hibiki became an assistant professor at Research Reactor Institute, Kyoto University in 1990, and was promoted to an associate professor in 1997. He was invited to be a full professor at School of Nuclear Engineering, Purdue University in 2006, and became a professor emeritus in 2018. Hibiki is currently a chair professor of thermal-fluid engineering at City University of Hong Kong. The Hong Kong government granted a Global STEM Professorship to Hibiki.

Hibiki first developed a high-time-resolution neutron radiography technique using a steady thermal neutron beam in 1994. For this achievement he was awarded 1995 Promising Endeavor Award, from Atomic Energy Society of Japan. He published a research article on the basic constitutive equations for predicting mini-channel two-phase fluid dynamics in International Journal of Multiphase Flow. These equations are known as Mishima-Hibiki equations and the paper is ranked No. 1 in citations for all papers published in International Journal of Multiphase Flow since 1974 as of November 1, 2018. He developed the interfacial area transport equation known as Hibiki-Ishii equation, which has been implemented into a commercial computational fluid dynamics code. He also co-authored the book Thermo-Fluid Dynamics of Two-Phase Flow.

== Recognition and awards ==
In 2015, Hibiki was awarded Osaka University Global Alumni Fellow from Osaka University.

1995 - Promising Endeavor Award, Atomic Energy Society of Japan 2001 - Preeminent Monograph Award, Japanese Society for Multiphase Flow 2001 - Young Member Engineering Achievement Award, American Nuclear Society 2005 - Research & Development Award, Japanese Society for Multiphase Flow 2007 - Engineering Achievement Award, Thermal-hydraulics Division, Atomic Energy Society of Japan 2010 - Preeminent Monograph Award, Japanese Society for Multiphase Flow 2011 - Distinguished Service Award, Heat Transfer Society of Japan 2011 - Fellow, American Nuclear Society 2015 - Best Paper Award, Japan Society of Mechanical Engineers 2015 – Osaka University Global Alumni Fellow 2016 - Award for Eminent Achievements in Nuclear Science and Technology, Atomic Energy Society of Japan 2018 - Preeminent Monograph Award, Japanese Society for Multiphase Flow
