= Magical Girl Pretty Sammy =

Japanese OVA (original video animation) series

- Key visual of Magical Girl Pretty Sammy

魔法少女プリティサミ～ (Mahō Shōjo Puriti Samī)
- Genre: Magical girl
- Original video animation
- Directed by: Kazuyuki Hirokawa; Takeshi Aoki; Yasuhito Kikuchi
- Written by: Yōsuke Kuroda; Hideyuki Kurata
- Music by: Seikou Nagaoka
- Studio: AIC
- Licensed by: US: Pioneer
- Released: March 24, 1995 – August 24, 1997
- Runtime: 45 minutes
- Episodes: 3
- Related series
- 1. Magical Project S 2. Sasami: Magical Girls Club

Magical Girl Pretty Sammy (魔法少女プリティサミー, Mahō Shōjo Puriti Samī) is a Japanese original video animation (OVA) series produced by Pioneer LDC and animated by AIC. The series spawned 3 episodes released direct-to-video between 1995 and 1997. It features character Sasami from the Tenchi Muyo! series as a magical girl, and is noted for recasting the Tenchi Muyo! characters in new roles. It has been dubbed into English by Pioneer USA. It also spawned two television series - Magical Project S, and Sasami: Magical Girls Club.

== Background ==
Magical Girl Pretty Sammy originated not in animation but in voice drama, beginning in 1993 with the release of Tenchi Muyo! Ryo-ohki CD Special 1 (Creation of the Universe Journey Across Space-Time). Here, Washu's newest invention, the Dimensional Controller, is glitched by the girls, creating several parallel Tenchi! worlds. Stories from the drama would later be adapted for Tenchi Universe's "Time and Space Adventures" arc (episodes 11-13). A second CD release, Tenchi Muyo! Ryo-ohki's Christmas, incorporated ideas revisited again in the series, drawing on Tsunami as the source of Pretty Sammy's magical powers.

The music video for "Pretty Sammy, the Magical Girl", originally part of the Tenchi Muyo! Soundfile, marked Pretty Sammy's anime debut. After having a kiss between her and Tenchi interrupted by the villainous Kiyone, Sasami must transform into her magical alter-ego to save her love and teach his kidnappers a lesson. Though the Soundfile was never released officially in the U.S., this short can be seen during the end credits of the Mihoshi Special.

The Mihoshi Special OVA was the first time Sammy was ever featured as a full-fledged character in the animated medium, and after her appearance in Episode 12 of Tenchi Universe (Tenchi Muyo! TV: Time and Space Adventures Part 2) in a costume that more resembles Sailor Moon's than her original outfit, the magical girl would go on to star in OVA specials and television series of her own.

== Overview ==
Sasami Kawai is a cute young Japanese girl who is asked by magical queen-to-be Tsunami of Juraihelm to become "Magical Girl Pretty Sammy", a champion of justice. She is constantly harassed by Pixy Misa, an evil, but friendly magical girl created by a rival candidate for queen of the magical world, Ramia. Sasami is unaware that Pixy Misa is actually her best friend, Misao Amano, who herself is unaware of the transformation forced on her via hypnosis by Ramia's brother, Rumiya.

Collectively, the various Pretty Sammy vehicles spoof the magical girl genre of anime (particularly Sailor Moon, with the "champion of justice" theme), using the characters from AIC's popular Tenchi Muyo! series. Ryo-Ohki (who is a male in both of the Pretty Sammy series, but a female in Tenchi Muyo! material) is Pretty Sammy's assistant and plays the same role that Luna (of the Sailor Moon series) has done, including keeping the fact he can talk a secret.

Both the OVAs and the TV series are notable for the quality of the musical tracks. Many of the tracks are parodies of popular karaoke tunes.

The other major characters of Tenchi Muyo! appear in various roles in the OVA. They include: Tenchi, Washu, Mihoshi, Kiyone, Ayeka, and Ryoko.

== Music ==
- Opening: "Chanto Yume o Mimasho!" ("Dream Away"; Japanese version performed by Chisa Yokoyama, English version performed by Sharyn Scott)
- Ending 1 (episode 1): "Baka" ("Idiot") ["Money No More"] (Japanese version performed by Chisa Yokoyama, English version performed by Sharyn Scott)
- Ending 2 (episode 2) and "Insert Song" (episode 1): "Ai no Makeikusa" ("Losing the Fight of Love"; performed by Rika Matsumoto) and replaced in English version with Your Hiroshi, performed by Diane Michelle)
- Ending 3 (episode 3): "Mahô no Tobira" ("Magical Door"; Japanese version performed by Chisa Yokoyama, English version performed by Sharyn Scott)

== Episodes ==
No.	Title	Japanese release date	English release date
1	"Magical Girl Pretty Sammy" "Mahō Shōjo Puriti Samī" (魔法少女プリティサミー)	August 25, 1995	October 24, 1995
Sasami has been chosen by candidate queen Tsunami as champion of justice "Magical Girl Pretty Sammy", with Ryo-Ohki as her guide. Meanwhile, Tsunami's jealous sister Ramia has her brother Rumiya turn Sasami's best friend Misao into the chaotic "Pixy Misa". Pixy's first attack is to intensify a love triangle between Ryoko and Ayeka for Tenchi's affection by turning the two quarrelling girls into love-love monsters. With Tenchi's help, Pretty Sammy is able to dispel the love-love curse from the girls.
2	"Revenge of the Imperial Electronic Brain" "Dennō Teikoku no Gyakushū" (電脳帝国の逆襲)	June 25, 1996	March 25, 1997
Biff Standard, a greedy US entrepreneur, is plotting to expand his business, SynchroniCity, into Japan, aided by Ramia. Pixy spreads the SynchroniCity program into computers all over Sasami's home town. The Standardisation power attracts the moon towards Earth. With Miss Washu's programming, Pretty Sammy is able to put Biff's software offline, cure Biff of his mania, and save the Earth from colliding with the moon.
3	"Super Kiss" "Supā Kissu" (スーパーキッス)	August 24, 1997	April 28, 1998
A comet has landed in Japan, where Tsunami and her family are on vacation. Ramia has gone missing and become an amnesiac. Washu analyses a sentient blob of cosmic slime that was found at the comet crash site. Misao is attacked by a sorcerer, who overwhelms Pretty Sammy the next day. Makoto and the sorcerer are revealed to be transformed cosmic slimes. With Ryo-Ohki and Pixy's help, Pretty Sammy defeats the sorcerer, who restores Ramia's memories.
