= Washu =

Washu can refer to:

- WashU, an abbreviation for Washington University in St. Louis
- Washū, another name for Yamato Province, Japan
- Washu Hakubi, a fictional character the manga series Tenchi Muyo!
