= Mark Laskowski =

American voice actor (born 1968)

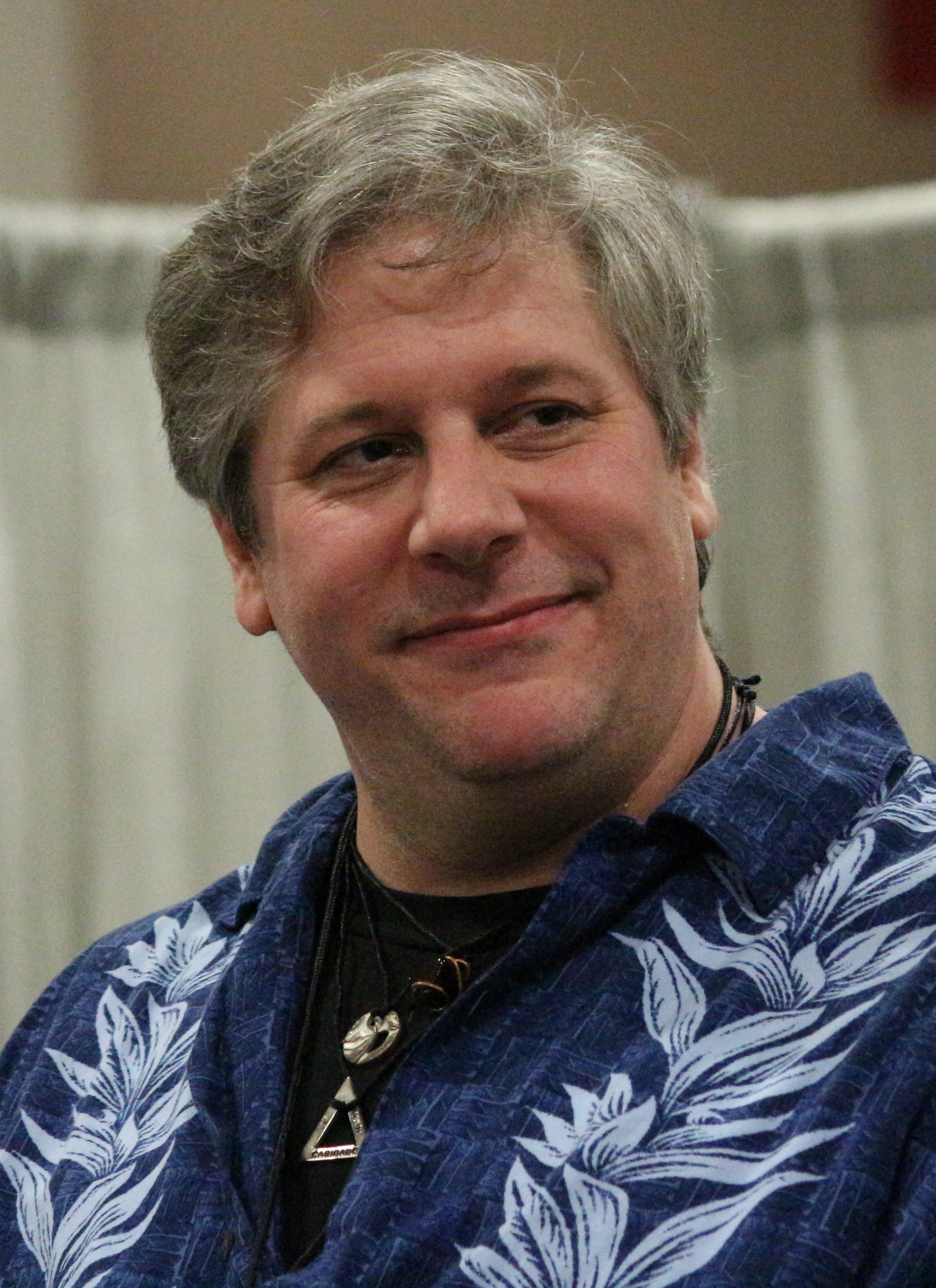
- Laskowski at Animate Miami in 2013
- Born: Mark X. Laskowski; March 15, 1968 (age 58); Parma, Ohio
- Occupation: Voice actor

Mark X. Laskowski (born March 15, 1968, in Parma, Ohio) is an American voice actor. He is known for many roles in anime dubs for ADV Films and Seraphim Digital/Sentai Filmworks, such as Shinpachi Shimura from Gintama the Movie, Kobungo Inuta from Hakkenden, K from Puni Puni Poemi, Flint from the Bodacious Space Pirates movie, and Tweedledim from the Mardock Scramble movies.

== English dubbing roles ==
- Air Gear - Issa "Buccha" Mihotoke
- Akame ga Kill! - Kaku (Ep. 11), Pimp (Ep. 6)
- AKB0048 - Yuka's Father, Additional Voices
- Angel Beats! - Igarashi (Ep. 9), Mysterious Youth (Ep. 12)
- Angelic Layer - Masaharu Ogata
- Area 88 - Bucksy (ADV dub)
- The Book of Bantorra - Relia Bookwat
- Btooom! - Mitsuo Akechi
- Campione! - Toma Amakasu
- Clannad After Story - Tajima, Additional Voices
- Coicent - Yellow Brother
- Comic Party Revolution - Yosshi
- Cyber Team in Akihabara - Mr. Takaido (Ep. 8)
- Diamond Daydreams - Jurouta Toubiki
- Devil Survivor 2: The Animation - Yuzuru Akie
- Dirty Pair OVA - Li
- Excel Saga - Norikuni Iwata
- From the New World - Subaru
- Ghost Hound - Eiichi Ooya, Hiroshi Furusawa
- Gintama: The Movie - Shinpachi Shimura
- Godannar - Morimoto
- The Guin Saga - Duke Bek, Vlon
- Guyver: The Bio-Boosted Armor - Elegen
- Haikyu!! - Akira Kunimi, Isamu Nakashima
- Hakkenden: Eight Dogs of the East - Kobungo Inuta
- Hakuōki - Kodo Yukimura, Misawa
- Halo Legends - Teenage Boy (Homecoming), Marine (The Babysitter)
- Highschool of the Dead - Kohta Hirano
- Horizon in the Middle of Nowhere II - Felipe Segundo, Kobold, Milton, Pedro Valdes
- Intrigue in the Bakumatsu - Irohanihoheto - Kaen Ryu (Ep. 5-6), Tesshu Yamaoka, Tsuginosuke Kawai
- Inu x Boku SS - Yujiro Kouda
- Kiba - Stonos, Xeed, Additional Voices
- Kurau Phantom Memory - Mike (Ep. 1)
- Legends of the Dark King - Juza, Hucker
- Majestic Prince - Degawa, Shinzaburo, Shirato
- Majikoi! - Oh! Samurai Girls - Maro Ayanokoji, Yamato's Father (Ep. 13), Dog (Ep. 2)
- Mardock Scramble: The Second Combustion - Tweedledim
- Martian Successor Nadesico - Jun Aoi
- Mazinkaiser - Boss
- Nerima Daikon Brothers - Korean Boss
- Night Raid 1931 - Senzo Kakinuma (Ep. 0), Seishiro Itagaki (Ep. 7), Additional Voices
- Noir - Rizzo
- Papuwa - Nagoya Willow, Great Man-God, Blue Scat Mouse
- Parasyte - Mamoru Uda
- Problem Children are Coming from Another World, aren't they? - Male Calico Cat
- Pumpkin Scissors - Paulo
- RahXephon - Souichi Yagumo
- Science Ninja Team Gatchaman - Mukashiski (Ep. 38), Additional Voices (ADV Dub)
- Shirobako - Seiichi Kinoshita
- Sister Princess - Minai
- The Ambition of Oda Nobuna - Konoe Sakihisa
- The Super Dimension Fortress Macross - Warera Nantes
- The World God Only Knows - Dokurou Skull (Season 3, OVAs)
- Tsuritama - Duck Leader
- UFO Ultramaiden Valkyrie - Fukami
- Xam'd Lost Memories - Junichiro Nishimura, Minagawa
