= Hakugei: Legend of the Moby Dick =

Japanese anime television series

白鯨伝説 (Hakugei Densetsu)
- Anime television series
- Directed by: Osamu Dezaki
- Produced by: Tetsuo Katayama (1–18); Tsuneyuki Morishima (1–18); Minoru Kubota (19–26); Sumio Udagawa (19–26)
- Written by: Katsuhiko Koike; Kouji Ueda; Eto Mori; Osamu Dezaki
- Music by: Masahiro Andoh; Hirotaka Izumi
- Studio: Studio Annaparu; Studio Junio (1–18); Tezuka Productions (19–26)
- Original run: 1997-04-09 – 1999-05-12
- Episodes: 26

Hakugei: Legend of the Moby Dick or Moby Dick: Great Whale in Space (白鯨伝説, Hakugei Densetsu; lit. 'White Whale Legend') is a Japanese animated television series, based on Herman Melville's 1851 novel Moby-Dick, which aired from 1997 to 1999. However, this adaptation used futuristic outer space as the setting, with "whales" being large abandoned spaceships instead. It aired from 9 April 1997 to 12 May 1999, albeit with a suspension of new episodes from November 1997 to October 1998. The series ran for 26 episodes, which have been released on DVD in the US by ADV Films, spread across six discs, it was then dubbed into Arabic by Venus Center and aired on Space Power from 2008 to 2014, and then from 2016 to 2019, after which it became a segment on Spacetoon.

== Plot ==
In space, space pirates earn their sole income by hunting "whales" — giant robotic spaceships, abandoned and drifting in space, that are rich in resources when successfully captured. Ahab, a pirate captain, is obsessed with capturing a particular white whale, the Moby Dick. Things change after a 14-year-old girl called Lucky joins his motley crew of pirates and refugees.

== Characters ==
=== Main characters ===
Due
Voiced by: Toshihiko Seki (Japanese); Vic Mignogna (English)
He is an android for planet development whose registration number is ESP4678-201.
Ahab
Voiced by: Akio Ōtsuka (Japanese); John Swasey (English)
His real name is Ahab Ishmael Ali. 35 years old. The captain of a spacecraft Lady Whisker.

Ahab has a deep hatred for Moby Dick because it took his left eye and left leg from him, following an attack Ahab led on an unregistered ship (which turned out to be carrying civilians).

Lucky
Voiced by: Yūko Mizutani (Japanese); Kira Vincent-Davis (English)
14-year-old girl who stows away on the Lady Whisker to gain Ahab's assistance in saving her planet Moad from the Federation and their ultimate weapon Moby Dick. Upon being Discovered by the crew Lucky begs to join them as a whale hunter, following a test in which Lucky had to retrieve a coin at the bottom of a well filled with water (which had been filled with a liquid that makes a person sink not float), Lucky was saved by Ahab but managed to retrieve the coin. Having proven herself, Lucky becomes an Apprentice Whale Hunter under Atre's supervision, and soon earns the respect of the other crew members including captain Ahab. Brave and resourceful, Lucky quickly settled into life onboard Lady Whisker, while still hiding the fact that she was a girl. After being found out however she begs Ahab to save her planet from the Federation which Ahab accepts upon learning that Moby Dick is involved.

=== Ahab Whaling Company ===
Atre
Voiced by: Shiho Niiyama (episodes 1–19), Makiko Ōmoto (episodes 20–26) (Japanese); Stephanie Nadolny (English)
11 years old probationer. Atre has a great respect for Ahab and aspires to be like him, this is partly because of his father who served the captain as his right hand for many years before his death. Atre takes Lucky on as an Apprentice Whale Hunter, the two eventually becomes good friends. After finding out that Lucky was a girl, it appears that Atre has a crush on her.
Doc
Voiced by: Keīchi Sonobe (Japanese); David Born (English)
Doc Christiansen. The chief doctor, Ahab's right arm.
Cook
Voiced by: Katsuhisa Hōki (Japanese); Rob Mungle (English)
The chief cook.
Barba
Voiced by: Ryūzaburō Ōtomo (Japanese); George Manley (English)
The progeny of the Tattoo tribe which is the dauntless aborigine of the Daimama star.
Speed King
Voiced by: Naoya Uchida (Japanese); John Gremillion (English)
An able pilot. A former racer.
Mutz
Voiced by: Kiyoyuki Yanada (Japanese); Illich Guardiola (English)
A swordsman.
Academias
Voiced by: Takuma Suzuki (Japanese); Chris Patton (English)
The mechanic supervisor.
Lucy
Voiced by: Takuma Suzuki (Japanese); Monica Rial (English)
The loyal bird of Captain Ahab, it delivers messages to the crew and is usually seen around Lucky and Atre.

=== The Federal Police ===
White Hat
Voiced by: Yoshito Yasuhara (Japanese); Andrew Love (English)
A detective of the First Investigation Division of Federal Police 86th Precinct.

=== Planet Moad ===
Sara
Voiced by: Emi Shinohara (Japanese); Christine Auten (English)
A singer. A woman model android.
Shiro
Voiced by: Tsutomu Kashiwakura (Japanese); Braden Hunt (episodes 5, 10), Blake Shepard (episodes 12–26) (English)
Shiro Tokisada. The leader of resistance group of planet Moad. Lucky's elder brother.
Lisa
Voiced by: Rei Sakuma (Japanese); Luci Christian (English)
The member of the resistance group of Planet Moad.
Garcia
Voiced by: Kiyoshi Kobayashi (Japanese); Marty Fleck (English)
The former worker of the 16th mining area of Planet Moad. 67 years old.
Mika
Voiced by: Rei Sakuma (Japanese); Luci Christian (English)
Mika Michelle Idha. The girl who belongs to planet Moad, resistance.

=== Earth Federation ===
Murato
Voiced by: Tesshō Genda (Japanese); Christopher Ayres (English)
The captain of the Moad garrison. A giant android measuring 3 meters tall.
Ohara
Voiced by: Hiromi Tsuru (Japanese); Kaytha Coker (English)
Jane Ohara. A special adviser of the planet development of the Earth Federation.
General Ho
Voiced by: Yu Mizushima (Japanese); Rick Burford (English)
The commander of the Seventh Fleet of the Earth Federation expeditionary forces. The 14th son of the new president.
Moby Dick
Voiced by: Yūji Mikimoto (Japanese); James Faulkner (English)
Super space battleship of Earth Federales. It was remodeled into the planet extinction weapon later and floats on Moad orbit.

=== Others ===
Marie
Voiced by: Eiko Kudō (Japanese); Jessica Boone (English)
A women's college student of the planet Cape God. She stowed away on Lady Whisker and who is in love with Ahab.
