= John Gremillion =

American voice actor

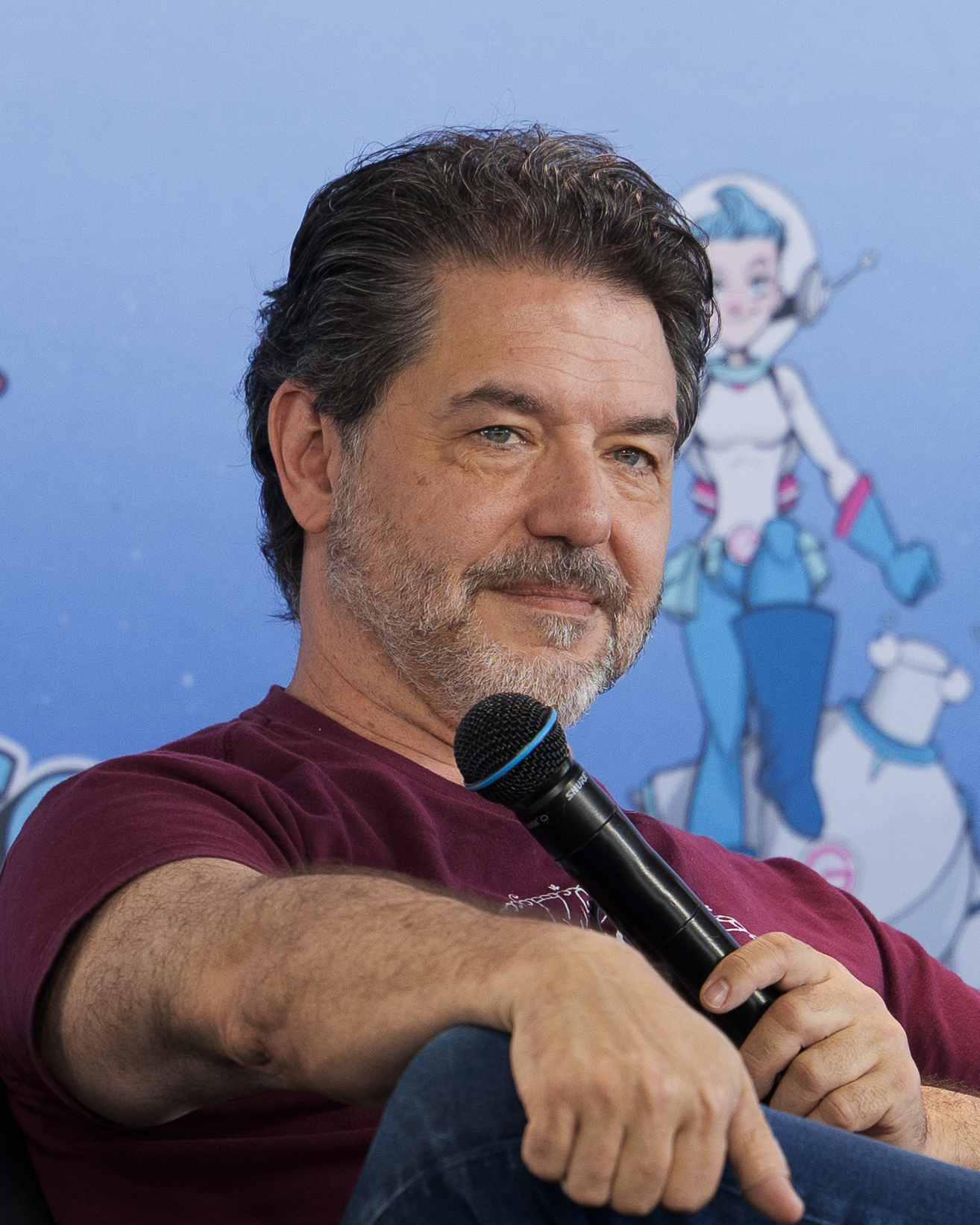
- Gremillon at GalaxyCon Nashville in 2026
- Education: Juilliard School; University of Texas, Austin (BFA)
- Occupation: Voice actor
- Agent: Pastorini-Bosby Talent

John Gremillion is an American stage and voice actor. He has provided voices for a number of English-language versions of Japanese anime series and video games; notable credits include Gentle Criminal from My Hero Academia, Dracule Mihawk from One Piece, Roland Chappelle from Food Wars, Arthur Randall from Black Butler, Go Mutsugi from Area 88, Yamato Hotsuin from Devil Survivor 2: The Animation, Nobuteru Irihata from Haikyū!!, Hakuoro from Utawarerumono, and Takeshi Hirokawa from Parasyte.

He attended the University of Texas at Austin film school and studied drama at the Juilliard School.

== Filmography ==
=== Anime ===
1999

- Bubblegum Crisis Tokyo 2040 - Motoslave, Nigel Kirkland
- Martian Successor Nadesico - Admiral Sadake Munetake, Gekiganger Narrator, Genhachiro Akiyama
- Those Who Hunt Elves - Pierre

2000

- Gasaraki - Tamotsu Hayakawa, Capt. Raiko
- Street Fighter II V - Narrator (ADV dub)

2001

- Princess Nine - Hidehiko Hayakawa, Vice-Principal Kodanuki
- Sorcerous Stabber Orphen - Rox Roe

2002

- Chance Pop Session - Sho Kaibara
- Excel Saga - Kitayama, Aesop (Ep. 11), Additional Voices

2003

- Aura Battler Dunbine - Todd Guinness
- Dirty Pair: Affair of Nolandia - Oran
- Full Metal Panic! - Colonel Estes (Ep. 19), Goddard, Olmos (Ep. 18), Koh
- Magical Shopping Arcade Abenobashi - Kouhei, Masayuki Asahina (Young)
- Martian Successor Nadesico: The Motion Picture - Prince of Darkness - Sadake Munetake, Genharchiro Akiyama
- Noir - Doctor, Guerrilla (Ep. 7)
- Neo Ranga - Kageyama the Reporter, Mr. Aosaka, Unbo the Elder, Fuchizaki (Ep. 41-44)
- Rahxephon - Jin Kunugi
- Rune Soldier - Conrad, Jakinson
- Saint Seiya - Gigas, additional voices
- Saiyuki - Soutou (Ep. 22)
- Super GALS! - Taizo Kotobuki, Fukuroda (Ep. 11), Hideki (Ep. 8), Suganuma (Ep. 16)

2004

- Case Closed - Matthew Kohler (Ep. 113-114)
- Chrono Crusade - Jack Gilliam, Vincent Lerajie
- Cyberteam in Akihabara - Principal Ryugasaki
- D.N.Angel - Kyle, Police Chief Hiwatari
- Fullmetal Alchemist series - Roa (Law), Gartner
- Megazone 23 - Lieutenant Yuichiro Shiratori (Part II)
- Peacemaker Kurogane - Toshimaru Yoshida
- Puni Puni Poemy - Mr. Kitayama
- Slayers Gorgeous - Lord Culvert

2005

- Area 88 - Makoto Shinjou
- Cromartie High School - Yutaka Takenouchi
- Divergence Eve - Luke Walker
- E's Otherwise - Edgar Hanson
- Full Metal Panic? Fumoffu - Takigawa, Mr. Kogure, Jindai
- Gantz - Genju Kannon (Ep. 25), Juzo Togo, Ryuji Kajiura
- Gilgamesh - The Steward
- Godannar - Ken, Lou Roux
- Hakugei: Legend of the Moby Dick - Speed King
- Kodocha - Takeshi Gojo
- Maburaho - Shunji Kamashiro
- Madlax - Charlie
- Mythical Detective Loki Ragnarok - Misao Daidoji, Hideki Takaya
- Samurai Gun - Geki
- Science Ninja Team Gatchaman - Arthur (Ep. 46), Bob Barker (Ep. 74), Captain Francis 7, Koji (Ep. 56), Additional Voices (ADV Dub)
- Tree of Palme - Voice of Soma
- Yumeria - Mister Ishikari

2006

- Bakumatsu Kikansetsu Irohanihoheto - Hijikata Toshizo
- Basilisk: The Kōga Ninja Scrolls - Muroga Hyouma
- Desert Punk - Koji Okawa
- Full Metal Panic! The Second Raid - Alastor, Jun-Gyu, Yang
- Fullmetal Alchemist: The Conqueror of Shamballa - Huskisson
- Guyver: The Bioboosted Armor - Commander Gregole, Detective Vamore (Ep. 2), Misawa, Officer Johnson (Ep. 1), Sin
- Jinki: Extend - Hakuya (Ep. 12), Kokusho, The Chief
- Nerima Daikon Brothers - Yakuza Boss (Ep. 4)
- Shadow Skill - Klack
- Speed Grapher - Otsuka (Ep. 2), Hashimoto (Ep. 9)
- The Super Dimension Fortress Macross - Vrlitwhai Kridanik
- Tactics - Raiko Minamoto
- Trinity Blood - Cardinal Francesco de Medici
- Witchblade - Muraki
- Yugo the Negotiator - Lt. Col. Shekin

2007

- 009-1 - Ivan Godunov (Ep. 1)
- Air - Keisuke Tachibana
- Air Gear - Gonzo, Inuyama, Yasuyoshi Sano
- Best Student Council - Kazuhiro Kinjo
- Le Chevalier D'Eon - Conte di Cagliostro
- Coyote Ragtime Show - Allen, Bruce
- Glass Fleet - Theodoric
- Hell Girl - Takashi Murai (Ep. 21-22)
- Innocent Venus - Steve
- Kurau: Phantom Memory - Dr. Hajime Amami
- One Piece - Dracule "Hawkeye" Mihawk (Funimation dub)
- Pani Poni Dash! - Saotome
- Pumpkin Scissors - Hosslo (Ep. 2)
- SoltyRei - Dale Boyd (Ep.1)
- Tokyo Majin - Morihito Inugami, Doshin Narasaki
- Utawarerumono - Hakuoro, Dii
- The Wallflower - Kinoyama (Ep. 5), Ranmaru's Father (Ep. 14)
- Xenosaga: The Animation - Gaignun Kukai, Albedo Piazzolla

2008

- Appleseed Ex Machina - Dr. Riharuto Kestner
- Darker than Black - Kenneth (Ep. 3-4)
- Devil May Cry: The Animated Series - Michel (Ep. 2)
- The Galaxy Railways - Schwanhelt Bulge
- Moonlight Mile - Lostman

2009

- D.Gray-man - Vittorio (Ep. 16-17)
- Kenichi: The Mightiest Disciple - Hoshino
- Kiba - Kemp
- Nabari no Ou - Hideo Nowake (Ep. 7-8, 21)
- Shigurui: Death Frenzy - Nobumasa Asakura (Ep. 1)

2010

- Eden of the East - Daiju Mononobe
- Ghost Hound - Takashi Nire
- Halo Legends - Fal (The Duel), Arthur (The Package)
- Legends of the Dark King: A Fist of the North Star Story - Dagale
- Tears to Tiara - Creon, Edith, Myrddin, Narrator

2011

- Black Butler - Arthur Randall, Havoc (Ep. 17)
- Coicent - Company President Mama
- Golgo 13 - Various Voices
- Five Numbers! - N35 (Middle-Age Man/Pinch-Hitter)
- Highschool of the Dead - Matsudo
- Night Raid 1931 - Kazura Iha

2012

- The Book of Bantorra - Machia, Vexile
- Horizon in the Middle of Nowhere - Tenzo Crossunite (Season 1), Nenji (Season 1), Noriki (Season 1), Francis Drake (Season 2), Hassan Fullbrush (Season 2)
- Intrigue in the Bakumatsu - Irohanihoheto - Toshizo Hijikata
- Panty & Stocking with Garterbelt - Cocktimis Prime (Ep. 7A)

2013

- Phi Brain: Puzzle of God - Bishop
- Rurouni Kenshin - New Kyoto Arc - Shinomori Aoshi

2014

- Devil Survivor 2: The Animation - Yamato Hotsuin
- Log Horizon - Karashin, Kazuhiko
- Majestic Prince - Giuliano Visconti, Shinjiro

2015

- Akame ga Kill! - Liver
- Dog & Scissors - Toji Nakahara
- Dramatical Murder - Toue
- Parasyte - Takeshi Hirokawa
- Vampire Hunter D - D (Sentai Filmworks dub)

2016

- Hanayamata - Masaru Ofuna
- Re: Hamatora - Shunichi Ishigami

2017

- Food Wars!: Shokugeki no Soma - Roland Chapelle
- Haikyū!! - Nobuteru Irihata
- Is It Wrong to Try to Pick Up Girls in a Dungeon? - Ottarl

2018

- Mr. Tonegawa - Keiichi Ogino

2020

- My Hero Academia - Danjuro Tobita/Gentle Criminal
- Shirobako - Masahiko Inami

2021

- Vinland Saga - The Ear, Halfdan
- The Heike Story - Taira no Shigemori

2022

- Kakegurui ×× - Jomaru, Announcer
- My Isekai Life - Proudwolf
- Reincarnated as a Sword - Elevent

2023

- Dead Mount Death Play
- Farming Life in Another World - Kuro
- Psycho-Pass Providence - Tonami

2024

- Dungeon People - Earth Spirit
- Helck - Chef Moonmi, Raphaed
- I Parry Everything - Dandalg
- I've Somehow Gotten Stronger When I Improved My Farm-Related Skills - Lemuru, Vritra
- The Most Heretical Last Boss Queen - Carl

2025

- Loner Life in Another World - Jock E
- Batman Ninja vs. Yakuza League - Commissioner Gordon
