= Godannar =

Anime series

- North American DVD cover of the first volume by ADV Films

神魂合体ゴーダンナー!! (Shinkon Gattai Godannar!!)
- Genre: Comedy, mecha, romance
- Anime television series
- Directed by: Yasuchika Nagaoka
- Produced by: Takao Asaga; Toshio Hatanaka; Yasushi Shibahara; Tsuneo Takechi; Keiichi Takagi; Kouzou Mizushima
- Written by: Hiroyuki Kawasaki
- Music by: Michiaki Watanabe
- Studio: OLM; AIC A.S.T.A.
- Licensed by: NA: ADV Films (expired) Sentai Filmworks (2013-06-27)
- Original network: AT-X, TV Kanagawa, KBS Kyoto, Tokyo MX
- English network: NA: Anime Network
- Original run: October 1, 2003 – June 29, 2004
- Episodes: 26
- Video game
- Developer: Natsume Co., Ltd.
- Publisher: Bandai
- Genre: Fighting
- Platform: PlayStation 2
- Released: June 24, 2004
- icon

Godannar (神魂合体ゴーダンナー!!, Shinkon Gattai Gōdannā!!; sold as Marriage of God & Soul Godannar!! in North America) is a Japanese anime television series created by Yasuchika Nagaoka, Anime International Company and Project Godannar, which consists of IMAGICA Entertainment, Taki Corporation, KlockWorx, NTT Data Contents Planing, Sojitz and Oriental Light and Magic. The series is produced by AIC and OLM, with Nagaoka serving as director and Hiroyuki Kawasaki as its main scriptwriter. The first season aired in Japan from October 1 to December 24, 2003, on AT-X. A second season later aired from April 5 to June 29, 2004. Both seasons were licensed by ADV Films for North America, but it was then later licensed by Sentai Filmworks in 2013.

== Plot ==
In 2042, alien threats known as the Mimetic Beasts (擬態獣, gitaijū) are defeated during a battle in Japan when robot pilot Goh Saruwatari defeats the alien "boss" with his robot, the Dannar, and saves his future fiancée, Anna Aoi.

The Mimetic Beasts return in 2047 on Goh and Anna's wedding day. Goh and Dannar are called to action, leaving Anna at the altar.

As Goh struggles in his battle against the Mimetic Beasts, Anna stumbles upon a sealed robot called Neo Okusaer. She is able to activate and pilot the Neo Okusaer to save her fiancé by merging it with the Dannar to activate the Godannar's Twin Drive.

Over the course of the series, humanity is threatened by the Insania virus, which is spread by the Mimetic Beasts. All of humanity is infected, but as the virus is stimulated by human hormones, especially those released in great quantities during combat, the virus only adversely affects robot pilots since they come into close contact with the beasts on a regular basis: The virus has the effect of transforming human males into Mimetic Beasts, while females are immune unless they naturally generate large amounts of male hormones.

=== Second season ===
The pilots of Dannar Base struggle to balance the need to fight the Mimetic Beasts with the increasing danger of further infection by the Insania virus. Eventually, it is discovered that Mira, Goh's former combat partner and lover who was trapped inside a Mimetic beast for five years, is the source of the vaccine that humanity needs.

== Characters ==
=== Dannar Base (Japan) ===
Goh Saruwatari (猿渡ゴオ（さるわたり ゴオ）, Saruwatari Gō)
Goh, the male protagonist, initially rescues Anna in a battle with the Mimetic Beasts. Over the course of five years, Goh and Anna developed a deep love for each other and plan to marry. However, when the Mimetic Beasts return, he experiences conflicting emotions towards other women, such as when Mira reawakens and Shizuru is killed. Despite these feelings, when Anna leaves Dannar Base due to her guilt and jealousy towards Mira, Goh chooses to remain loyal to her and sets aside his emotions for Mira. Throughout battles with the Mimetic Beasts, Goh contracts the Insania virus, eventually resulting in his body being encased in a cocoon, waiting to emerge as a Beast. To reverse this transformation, Goh is placed in suspended animation for seven years and is later cured with a vaccine made from Mira and Morimoto's son's DNA.
Voiced by: Takayuki Kondo (Japanese); Brett Weaver (English)
Anna Aoi (葵杏奈（あおい あんな）, Aoi Anna)/Anna Saruwatari (猿渡杏奈（さるわたり あんな）, Saruwatari Anna)
Anna is the female protagonist. An emergency call came from Dannar Base requesting Goh's assistance interrupts their wedding ceremony. She becomes the pilot of Neo Okusaer and later Go Okusaer, GoDannar's original partner. She becomes a surrogate mother to Lou and befriends and mentors Mira before learning of Mira's past with Goh. It is revealed through her conversation with Hidebo that Anna's desire to become a robot pilot came from her childhood. She, Goh, and Lou form the Godannar Triple Drive when Celleblader fuses with Godannar. At the end of the series, Anna and Goh remarry.
Voiced by: Mai Nakahara (Japanese); Hilary Haag (English)
Milla Ackerman (ミラ・アッカーマン, Mira Akkāman)/Miracle "Mira" Ackerman
Mira is the original pilot of Neo Okusaer. She is Goh's former combat partner and lover, as well as Max's ex-girlfriend, until she is apparently killed in battle. Five years later, Mira awakens without her memory. After regaining her full memories, she resumes her old duties as pilot of the Neo Okusaer. She tries to steal Goh from Anna at the end of the series by attempting to kill him to stop his transformation, a discussion with Anna makes her realize that Anna is Goh's true love and partner and she respectfully steps aside. She cannot die from her wounds as her prolonged time in the infected Club Mariner, which caused her DNA to evolve constantly and repair her body from even the worst physical injuries. Her DNA is developed as a cure for the infection caused by the Mimetic Beasts. She reveals at the end that her name is short for Miracle.
Voiced by: Aya Hisakawa (Japanese); Monica Rial (English)
Kiriko Aoi (葵霧子（あおい きりこ）, Aoi Kiriko)
Kiriko is Anna's mother and Goh's boss. She developed the Dannar project with her husband Tatsuya.
Voiced by: Takako Honda (Japanese); Laura Chapman (English)
Shizuru Fujimura (藤村静流（ふじむら しずる）, Fujimura Shizuru)
Shizuru is the pilot of Core Gunner. She is one of Goh's best friends and was secretly in love with him, but is unable to confess these feelings due to his relationship with Mira and later his marriage to Anna. She develops a close friendship with Anna and Goh's younger brother Shinobu. Shizuru is killed by a swarm of Type 19 Mimetic Beasts, but is resurrected by Mira. She becomes the general manager of Dannar Base while Kiriko Aoi and Commander Kagemaru search for a cure to the Insania virus.
Voiced by: Yumi Kakazu (Japanese); Tiffany Grant (English)
Tetsuya Kouji (光司鉄也（こうじ てつや）, Kōji Tetsuya)
Tetsuya is Shizuru's partner and G-Gunner's co-pilot. He spends most of the series recovering from injuries sustained in the battle from the first episode. He leaves Dannar Base to secretly train with Tatsuya. He later returns in the final episodes piloting both the G-Zero Gunner and Club Mariner for the grand battle against the Super Mimetic Beast. At the end of the series he is the vice commander of Dannar Base and still remains a pilot.
Voiced by: Nobuyuki Hiyama (Japanese); Christopher Ayres (English)
Max Junior (マックス・ジュニア, Makkusu Junia)
A Japan Base (later Dannar Base) pilot.
Shinobu Saruwatari (猿渡忍（さるわたり しのぶ）, Saruwatari Shinobu)/Nicchi (忍っち)
Shinobu is Goh's younger brother who lives with Goh and Anna. He becomes the pilot of the Neo Diver.
Voiced by: Junko Minagawa (Japanese); Greg Ayres (English)
Kagemaru (影丸（かげまる）)
Kagemaru is the commander of Danner Base. At the end of the series, he turns down a promotion from the commissioners to become a robot pilot.
Voiced by: Taro Yamaguchi (Japanese); Mike Vance (English)
Tatsuya Aoi (葵竜也（あおい たつや）, Aoi Tatsuya)
Tatsuya is Anna's father. He left his family when Anna was a small child and disguised himself as different people to watch over Anna and Dannar Base. He and Kiriko were the founders of the Dannar project. He appeared during the final episodes to aid Danner Base against the Super Mimetic Beast. He tries to leave again at the end but is interrupted by Kiriko.
Voiced by: Hiroya Ishimaru (Japanese); John Swasey (English)
Konami Sasagure (笹暮小波（ささくれ こなみ）, Sasakure Konami)/Konami (コナミ)
Konami is one of the two operators of the main ship's console. She becomes a pilot of Alpha Tiger at the end of the series alongside Momochi.
Voiced by: Akeno Watanabe (Japanese); Mariela Ortiz (English)
Momoko Momozono (桃園桃子（ももぞの ももこ）, Momozono Momoko)/Momochi (モモチー)
Momoko is one of the two operators of the main ship's console. She becomes a pilot of Alpha Tiger at the end of the series alongside Konami.
Voiced by: Mamiko Noto (Japanese); Brittney Karbowski (English)
Shibakusa (芝草（しばくさ）, Shibakusa)/Pops (おやっさん, Oyassan)
Shibakusa is the widowed head mechanic. He runs a ramen shop with Tonko in the end of the series seven years later until the base is repaired, when they resume their duties.
Voiced by: Jin Horikawa (Japanese); Rob Mungle (English)
Touko Hiiragi (柊冬子（ひいらぎ とうこ）, Hiiragi Tōko)/Tonko (トン子)
A female mechanic.
Nanae Hayashi (林奈々絵（はやし ななえ）, Hayashi Nanae)
Nanae is one of the mechanics at Dannar Base. She becomes infected by the virus after being eaten by a Type 13 Mimetic beast early in the series and becomes a carrier. She has a relationship with Morimoto, another mechanic at the base, and marries him. Her children become second generation carriers, whose DNA has the ability to repair the infected DNA caused by the Insania Virus.
Voiced by: Nanae Katō (Japanese); Cynthia Martinez (English)
Morimoto (森本（もりもと）)
Morimoto is a mechanic at the Dannar base who marries Hayashi and has three children.
Voiced by: Shinji Kawada (Japanese); Mark X. Laskowski (English)
Sugiyama (杉山（すぎやま）)
Sugiyama is the second head mechanic.
Voiced by: Daisuke Ono (Japanese); Andy McAvin (English)
Yanagisawa (柳沢（やなぎさわ）)
A mechanic.
Pinpin (ぴんぴん)
Anna's pet cat.

=== Union Base (England) ===
Knight Valentine (ナイト・ヴァレンタイン, Naito Varentain)
Knight is one of the pilots of the giant British robot Dragliner. According to Ellis, he is not infected by the virus because he has more feminine hormones due to his perverted behavior.
Voiced by: Hikaru Midorikawa (Japanese); Chris Patton (English)
Ellis Valentine (エリス・ヴァレンタイン, Erisu Varentain)
Ellis is the other pilot of Dragliner. Knight and Ellis refer to each other as brother and sister, though they are not related by blood. Ellis is in love with Knight and feels unable to express it due to their sibling connection and so acts jealous and frustrated with his constant skirt chasing. :Voiced by: Yukari Tamura (Japanese); Shannon Emerick (English)

=== Silicon Base (North America) ===
Shadow Dunaway (シャドウ・ダラウェイ, Shadō Darawei)
Shadow is the pilot of the giant American robot Genesister and the partner of Luna, whom she secretly loves. She is the only female to be severely affected by the virus due to her male hormones, but survives after her fight with Rose Type.
Voiced by: Yuko Kaida (Japanese); Christine Auten (English)
Luna (ルナ, Runa)
Luna is the co-pilot of Genesister and the partner of Shadow, whom she loves.
Voiced by: Tomoko Kawakami (Japanese); Sasha Paysinger (English)

=== Dino Base (China) ===
Moukaku (モウカク, Mōkaku)
Moukaku is the pilot of the giant Chinese robot Goddiner. After fighting Type 29 he becomes the second case of a full-blown infection by the Insania virus, like Max, and Knight is forced to kill him.
Voiced by: Jūrōta Kosugi (Japanese); George Manley (English)
Shukuyu (シュクユウ, Shukuyū)
Shukuyu is the co-pilot of the giant Chinese robot Goddiner. She tries to help Moukaku fight the virus, but he ejects her out of Goddiner before Knight destroys him.
Voiced by: Wakana Yamazaki (Japanese); Kelly Manison (English)

=== Vega Base (Russia) ===
Ekaterina (エカテリーナ, Ekaterīna)/Ecaterina
Ekaterina is the wealthy and well-endowed pilot of the giant Russian robot Volspina.
Voiced by: Miho Yamada (Japanese); Marcy Rae (English)
Kukrachyov (ククラチョフ, Kukurachofu)
Kukrachyov is the co-pilot of Volspina.
Voiced by: Shinji Kawada (Japanese); Illich Guardiola (English)

=== Cosmo Base ===
Lowe Roux (ロウ・ルー, Rō Rū)
Lou's father, and a Cosmo Base commander.

=== Menage Zero ===
Lou Roux (ルウ・ルー, Rū Rū)/Lou Lowe
Lou is a young orphan girl taken in by Goh and Anna and the pilot of Cosmo Diver. She was once an operator for the orbital space station that monitors the Earth for the presence of Type 17 Mimetic beasts, and is the lone survivor when the space station is destroyed. She becomes obsessed with becoming a robot pilot to avenge her father's death. At the end of the series, she continues to pilot Celleblader to fight the Mimetic Beasts, becoming a Menage Zero after Ken. She returns for a short while to witness Goh and Anna's wedding.
Voiced by: Kaori Shimizu (Japanese); Kira Vincent-Davis (English)
Ken (剣（けん）)
Ken is the rogue robot pilot of the Blade Gainer who makes it his life mission to defeat the Type 18 Mimetic beasts after his wife's death. He later takes Lou in when she begs Ken to teach her to be a pilot. He becomes infected by the virus, and ejects Lou from the Celleblader out of the Gainer before he dies in his last battle and warns her she will become like him if she fights for revenge. He attacks the Super Mimetic Beast to reveal its weakness to Godannar to finish it off.
Voiced by: Toru Ohkawa (Japanese); John Gremillion (English)
Rosa (ローザ, Rōza)
Rosa is the previous pilot of Celleblader. She saved Ken from a pack of Type 18 Mimetic Beasts several years ago at the cost of her life. She and Celleblader were absorbed into one of the Mimetic Beasts until Ken killed it. Although Celleblader was intact, Rosa was not inside the cockpit when Ken looked inside, suggesting that she was absorbed by the Mimetic Beast during her capture.
Voiced by: Junko Minagawa (Japanese); Carli Mosier (English)

=== Gakazono High School ===
Sakura Takaya (高谷さくら（たかや さくら）)
A 2nd year high school student, and Anna's classmate.
Hina Sugiura (杉浦ひな（すぎうら ひな）)
A 2nd year high school student, and Anna's classmate.
Kei Shino (志野けい（しの けい）)
A 2nd year high school student, and Anna's classmate.
Ikeyamada (池山田（いけやまだ）)
A 2nd year high school male student.
Horii (堀井（ほりい）)
A 2nd year high school male student.
Shimizu (清水（しみず）)
A 2nd year high school male student.
Tsuchida (土田（つちだ）)
A 2nd year high school male student.

== Episodes ==
=== Season one ===
No. overall	No. in season	Title	Original air date	English air date
1	1	"Wedding Bells on the Battlefield"; Transliteration: "Senjō no Uedingu Beru" (Japanese: 戦場のウェディングベル)	October 1, 2003	October 4, 2005
In 2042, while battling Mimetic Beasts, Goh Saruwatari rescues 12 year old Anna Aoi. Five years later, Goh is about to retire and is engaged to Anna. On the day of their wedding, the ceremony is interrupted by a call from Dannar Base when the Mimetic Beasts return. Goh leaves the wedding to pilot the Dannar after his friends and fellow mecha pilots have been defeated by an infected Club Mariner, which was once piloted by his best friend Max. As he struggles in his battle against the seemingly pilot-less robot, Anna stumbles upon a sealed mecha, Neo-Okusaer and accidentally exposes her relationship to the director of Dannar Base, Kiriko Aoi. Dannar and Neo-Okusaer merge to become the mighty robot Godannar and together they defeat the Mimetic Beast and Club Mariner. Kiriko receives a message in which footage of a nude blonde girl is seen falling out of Club Mariner, who is revealed to be Goh's ex-lover Mira in a flashback.
2	2	"Burning Virgin Road"; Transliteration: "Honō no Bājin Rōdo" (Japanese: 炎のバージンロード)	October 8, 2003	October 4, 2005
Kiriko feels that Anna is ready to become Goh's partner in battle and believes that her and Goh were destined to be married and that Goh should accept this, while Goh feels that piloting a robot is too dangerous for Anna. When Anna takes tests for what she believes is training for piloting a mecha, Goh becomes even more reluctant after seeing how tired she has become and rejects her as a pilot. Anna gets into a fight with Goh. Mira is placed in suspended animation. While the mechanics at Dannar Base try to remove the Mimetic Beast's remains from Club Mariner, two mechanics are attacked and Hayashi is absorbed by the monster, who escapes into the nearby town. Anna lures the creature away to her high school gym where she tries to get to a soccer robot. Goh activates Dannar and reaches the school, seemingly late without a trace of Shinobu, Anna or Hayashi and kills the Mimetic Beast in anger.
3	3	"Battle Royal Honeymoon"; Transliteration: "Batoru Roiyaru Hanemūn" (Japanese: バトルロイヤル・ハネムーン)	October 15, 2003	October 4, 2005
Anna, Shinobu and Hayashi did not die from the previous attack. and Anna and Goh have left Shinobu to go to their honeymoon in China. A Mimetic Beast is spotted close by and four bases answer the call. They attack together and seemingly defeat it. While the pilots introduce themselves, Luna dives in her Luna Sister and finds the Mimetic Beast's body is a decoy for the brain, and they must find a way to destroy it without releasing the toxic fluid in its body. The robots go into battle again, leaving Goh and Anna behind. The two free the other robots and merge, but the Beast flees. The other robots intercept and give Goh and Anna an opening, and they destroy it with their combined attacks.
4	4	"Shizuru, Once Again"; Transliteration: "Shizuru, Futatabi" (Japanese: 静流、再び)	October 22, 2003	October 4, 2005
Shizuru reflects upon her life in Dannar Base. A new Mimetic Beast is discovered: Type 16, which can burrow underground and regenerate itself to heal its wounds. It destroyed Oasis Base completely, leaving the few survivors in intensive care. Since Core Gunner is still under repair GoDannar and Neo Okusaer are sent to kill it, Anna leaves her friend Sakura with Shinobu. Goh is impaled on the Beast's retractable spikes and ends up in the medical ward. With Goh still in recovery, Neo Okusaer and Core Gunner are sent into battle with the beast. Anna fails to detonate the bomb she implanted in Type 16, and the Beast's attack renders the Core Gunner's automatic sniper arm useless. Shizuru hits the creature in a vulnerable spot and Anna and Goh merge and defeat it with the Heart Breaker.
5	5	"The Girl From the Sky"; Transliteration: "Sora Kara Kita Shōjo" (Japanese: 空から来た少女)	October 29, 2003	October 4, 2005
A mimetic beast attacks Cosmo Base in space. The base's leader stays behind to defend it and sends his daughter Lou down to earth so she will be safe. When Lou, in Cosmo Diver, and Goh return to the base to keep it from crashing in Earth, they fight the Mimetic Beast.
6	6	"The End of the Dream"; Transliteration: "Yume no Owari" (Japanese: 夢の終わり)	November 5, 2003	November 29, 2005
Goh learns that Max and Mira are alive, but had been in comas. Max steals Mira away, leading to a confrontation with Goh, whom he blames for losing her in the first place. Mira awakes from her coma without memories.
7	7	"Death by Reminiscing"; Transliteration: "Tsuioku ni Shisu" (Japanese: 追憶ニ死ス)	November 12, 2003	November 29, 2005
Max attacks the base in the Core Gunner. Goh confronts him in Godannar. Max blames Goh for Mira's death.
8	8	"The Graceful Shooting Star"; Transliteration: "Kareinaru Gekitsui Ō" (Japanese: 華麗なる撃墜王)	November 19, 2003	November 29, 2005
Repairs are underway at Dannar Base and a Mimetic Beast attacks. Dragliner deploys with Dannar and Neo-Okusaer.
9	9	"The Castaway Survival"; Transliteration: "Nagasarete Sabaibaru" (Japanese: 流されてサバイバル)	November 26, 2003	November 29, 2005
The fighters crash on an island. Go, Anna, Knight, and Ellis inspect the damage to their robots. Okusaer and Dannar can move, but the Jetboys are heavily damaged, so the four of them are stuck there. Rescue teams are sent out to recover the robots. But the Mimetic Beast in the area delays the rescue.
10	10	"Lu Takes Off"; Transliteration: "Rū Shutsugeki" (Japanese: ルウ出撃)	December 3, 2003	January 17, 2006
A mysterious robot fights against a mimetic beast that had been attacking Caucasus 1.
11	11	"A Flawless Departure"; Transliteration: "Yogorenaki Tabidachi" (Japanese: 汚れなき旅立ち)	December 10, 2003	January 17, 2006
Ken comes to Lou's rescue. Goh and Anna realize he is the one who attacked Caucasus 1, and they confront him. Lou decides to join Ken to learn from him.
12	12	"Those Who Have Departed"; Transliteration: "Sari Yuku Mono Tachi" (Japanese: 去り逝く者たち)	December 17, 2003	January 17, 2006
A Mimetic Beast attacks Cosmo Base, but the only one to challenge it is Shizuru in the Core Gunner.
13	13	"Last First-Kiss"; Transliteration: "Rasuto Fāsuto-Kisu" (Japanese: ラスト・ファーストキス)	December 24, 2003	January 17, 2006
Reports come in from across the globe of a large number of Mimetic Beasts, and robots worldwide fight them.

=== Season two ===
No. overall	No. in season	Title	Original air date	English air date
1	14	"The Reviving Soul"; Transliteration: "Yomigaeru Tamashī" (Japanese: 蘇る魂)	April 6, 2004	March 21, 2006
While in a state of limbo, a fallen mech pilot relives the events of the series.
2	15	"The New Confession"; Transliteration: "Arata Naru Kokuhaku" (Japanese: 新たなる告白)	April 13, 2004	March 21, 2006
Anna struggles to make a living. Mira has teamed up with Goh in Neo-Okusaer. Kiriko decides it might be time to bring out Go-Okusaer, a prototype of Neo-Okusaer.
3	16	"Its Name Is Go-Okusaer!"; Transliteration: "Sono Na wa Gō Okusā!" (Japanese: そのなはごーおくさー!)	April 20, 2004	March 21, 2006
Anna returns to the base. Shizuru tests the Go-Okusaer. Mira faints and Kiriko is worried about using her as a pilot.
4	17	"Tonko, My Love" (Japanese: TONKO MY LOVE)	April 27, 2004	March 21, 2006
A female mechanic named Tonko is being pushed into an arranged marriage that she does not want, but a Mimetic Beast destroys the restaurant where the wedding was to take place.
5	18	"Ice Cold Smile"; Transliteration: "Kōri no Bishō" (Japanese: 氷の微笑)	May 4, 2004	May 16, 2006
Anna and Shizuru train in order to be able to control the plasma drive. Ekaterina holds a party, but it gets interrupted when Mimetic Beasts attack and she has to go out to fight them.
6	19	"Genesister Out of Control!"; Transliteration: "Jeneshisutā Bōsō!" (Japanese: ジェネシスター暴走!)	May 11, 2004	May 16, 2006
Kiriko gets Max's data: there have been changes not only to his body, but to his brain as well. Luna gets nervous because it will be her and Shadow's last battle together, and she gets shot down.
7	20	"Sorrowful Song of the Plum Blossoms"; Transliteration: "Tōka Aika" (Japanese: 桃花哀歌)	May 18, 2004	May 16, 2006
The strange plague that killed Max is identified; it is called the Insania Virus. Moukaku gets into a bar fight, and he begins to undergo the same mutation as Max and Shadow.
8	21	"Godannar Ground Order!"; Transliteration: "Gōdannā Shutsudō Kinshi Meirei!" (Japanese: ゴーダンナー出動禁止命令!)	May 25, 2004	July 11, 2006
Goh is carrying the Insania Virus and is ordered to stop piloting the Dannar.
9	22	"Clash! Dannar vs. Gainer"; Transliteration: "Gekitotsu! Dannā VS Gainā" (Japanese: 激突!ダンナーVSガイナー)	June 1, 2004	July 11, 2006
Ken kills a Mimetic Beast before he mutates completely. Goh gets into Godannar to stop Ken.
10	23	"Dannar Base S.O.S."; Transliteration: "Dannā Bēsu SOS" (Japanese: ダンナーベースSOS)	June 8, 2004	July 11, 2006
Mimetic Beasts focus their attacks on the bases and they are able to control the bases' weapons.
11	24	"After the Mortal Combat"; Transliteration: "Shitō no Hate ni" (Japanese: 死闘の果てに)	June 15, 2004	August 29, 2006
The founder of Dannar Base, Tatsuya, resumes control. It is revealed that the Mimetic Beasts have developed the ability to merge and share their abilities, and they combine into a giant Mimetic Beast.
12	25	"The Eternal Couple"; Transliteration: "Eien no Futari" (Japanese: 永遠のふたり)	June 22, 2004	August 29, 2006
Ken has arrived, almost completely under the sway of Insania. He and Goh, slowly succumbing to Insania, attack the Beast, but it tries to absorb Godannar into itself. Mira attacks Godannar before it can cause too much damage and Anna tries to stop her.
13	26	"The Inevitable Tomorrow"; Transliteration: "Kitarubeki Ashita" (Japanese: 来るべき明日)	June 29, 2004	August 29, 2006
The humans win against the Mimetic Beasts, but Goh transforms completely. Seven years later, a cure for the Insania Virus is found, and Goh and Anna get remarried. During their ceremony, the last Mimetic Beasts attack. Goh, Anna, and the rest of the pilots go out to fight them.

== Reception ==
Stig Høgset of T.H.E.M. Anime Reviews praised season one for the animation, but criticized the story in later episodes.The seven volumes of the ADV Films release were graded by Chris Beveridge in his reviews at Mania.com, and ranged from A− for the first two volumes to B for volumes five and six. Theron Martin of Anime News Network gave a generally favorable review of the first volume, though he commented that Hilary Haag "gets a little too shrill at a couple of points". Mike Toole has complimented the director Yasushi Nagaoka and some of the voice actors, including the Japanese and English voices for Goh and Anna.

== Adaptations ==
A series of 4-volume novel was published by Kadokawa under the MF Bunko J imprint:

- Vol. 1 (ISBN 978-4-84011049-5, 2004-03-25)
- Vol. 2 (ISBN 978-4-84011074-7, 2004-04-24)
- Vol. 3 (ISBN 978-4-84011091-4, 2004-05-25)
- Vol. 4 (ISBN 978-4-84011106-5, 2004-06-25)

A series of 2-volume comic was published by Kadokawa under the Dengeki Comics EX imprint, authored by Seta Noriyasu:

- Vol. 1 (ISBN 978-4-84022718-6, 2004-06-10)
- Vol. 2 (ISBN 978-4-84023008-7, 2005-03-10)
