= Intrigue in the Bakumatsu – Irohanihoheto =

Japanese television series

- Promotional poster of Intrigue in the Bakumatsu – Irohanihoheto, featuring Yojiro Akizuki

幕末機関説 いろはにほへと (Bakumatsu Kikansetsu Irohanihoheto)
- Genre: Historical fantasy
- Created by: Hajime Yatate; Ryōsuke Takahashi
- Original net animation
- Directed by: Ryōsuke Takahashi (Note: Credited as Supervising Director (総監督).); Yoshimitsu Ōashi (Note: Credited as Chief Director (チーフディレクター).)
- Produced by: Keiichi Matsumura; Kōji Morimoto
- Written by: Junichi Miyashita (Note: Credited as Chief Writer (チーフライター).)
- Music by: Hideyuki Fukasawa
- Studio: Sunrise
- Licensed by: NA: Sentai Filmworks; (expired)
- Released: October 6, 2006 – April 6, 2007
- Runtime: 24 minutes
- Episodes: 26

Intrigue in the Bakumatsu – Irohanihoheto (Japanese: 幕末機関説 いろはにほへと, Hepburn: Bakumatsu Kikansetsu Irohanihoheto) is a Japanese original net animation (ONA) series, created by Ryōsuke Takahashi and Sunrise, with character designs by Yusuke Kozaki. The series follows Yojiro Akizuki, the bearer of the legendary Moon Tear Sword, who is on a mission to seal a supernatural object known as the Head of the Conqueror, which has now appeared during the Boshin War. Yojiro will not rest until his mission is fulfilled, no matter what or who gets in his way.

== Plot ==
The series is set in the Bakumatsu era, with the Shogunate being in its final years, and war fast approaching. When Yojiro Akizuki, a dark and mysterious mercenary, nears something supernatural with some kind of importance to him, the ornament on the end of his sword hilt waves in its direction, his eyes glow mysteriously, and he is driven to go after it. He comes across a traveling theater group who is out for revenge for the killing of the parents of the group's leader, and whose mysterious playwright likes to secretly help along events of history. Yojiro joins them to lend them his skill against their enemies, while dark conspiracy continues to follow behind him.

== Characters ==
=== Main characters ===
Yojiro Akizuki (秋月耀次郎, Akizuki Yōjirō)
Voiced by: Daisuke Namikawa (Japanese); Houston Hayes (English)
The seventeen-year-old legendary Eternal Assassin (永遠の刺客, Eien no Shikaku), Yojiro is the bearer of the legendary Moon Tear Sword (月涙刀, Getsuruitō), tasked with the quest of utilizing its blade to destroy the Head of the Conqueror (覇者の首, Hasha no Kubi), a supernatural object said to appear during times of unrest and revolution. He was once a close confidante, friend and bodyguard of the late Ryoma, whose assassination he failed to prevent and which continues to haunt him to the current day. During the midst of his quest to destroy the Head of the Conqueror, he visits Yokohama and happens to meet the Yuyama Troupe, an adventuring kabuki group, and its leader Kakunojo. While in the city, Yojiro senses the aura of the Head of the Conqueror within an auction held in the Shanghai Club, soon breaking through its confines in attempting to cut it in half. However, even if its head appeared to have been cut, the spirit of the elusive Head of the Conqueror was not destroyed and still remains, with Yojiro continuing in his quest to find and destroy it. Occasionally, Yojiro acts as the personal bodyguard to the Yuyama Troupe. He is shown to have some feelings of love for Kakunojo.

Kakunojo Yuyama

Kakunojo Yuyama (遊山赫乃丈, Yuyama Kakunojō)
Voiced by: Rina Satō (Japanese); Emily Neves (English)
A young woman and leader of the Yuyama Troupe, Kakunojo's parents, shipping and wholesale merchants, were murdered by Hario, as part of the Ansei Purges for being a staunch supporter for the Emperor, when she was still a young child, and was saved from death in the same incident by the brave actions of her late father's acquaintance Zagashira and apprentice Ebisu. With her home destroyed in the same fire, Kakunojo, along with Zagashira and Ebisu, formed the Yuyama Troupe and visit various regions around the country to seek Hario, in order to exact revenge upon the murder of her parents. Their group was soon joined by Sotetsu, an intelligent playwright, and later by Shiranui and Kakashi, both of whom were attracted to the group's ideals. Her real past is that she was also in the same orphanage as Yojiro but was adopted. Later during the series, she develops strong feelings of love for Yojiro, noting that their destinies are intertwined. Lord Shoten says that the sword that calls to her is the "yang to Yojiro's Moon Tear Sword yin".
Sotetsu Ibaragi (茨木蒼鉄, Ibaragi Sōtetsu)
Voiced by: Kazuhiko Inoue (Japanese); Illich Guardiola (English)
The extremely intelligent and mysterious playwright of the Yuyama Troupe, Sotetsu is respected by each member of the group, who call him Sensei. He works secretly to attain Lord Shoten's Head of the Conqueror, manipulating events behind the scenes, and is in business with the infamous Jubei early on in the story. He later joins Enomoto in rebuilding the republic to further his own plan.

=== Yuyama Troupe ===
Shiranui Kozo (不知火小僧)
Voiced by: Junichi Suwabe (Japanese); David Matranga (English)
An actor of the Yuyama Troupe under the stage name Seijūrō Yuyama, Shiranui joined the group after one of Sotetsu's plays saved him from being executed. He slept with a policeman's wife. The police killed his wife and framed him for murder. He enjoys visiting the red-light district and has feelings for Kotoha.
Ebisu no Zukin (恵比須の頭巾)
Voiced by: Masashi Yabe (Japanese); Greg Ayres (English)
One of the actors of the Yuyama Troupe, Ebisu was an apprentice of Kakunojo's household, who had treated him very well. When the household was being burnt and Kakunojo's parents were murdered before his very eyes by Hario as part of the Ansei Purges, Ebisu attempted to protect Kakunojo, and while doing so, he was burnt by the resulting fire, forced to live the rest of his life with bandages covering his face and body.
Kakashi no Keishin (案山子の恵信)
Voiced by: Kenji Nomura (Japanese); Steve Fenley (English)
The strongman of the Yuyama Troupe, Kakashi is a good-hearted person who joined the group for a similar reason to Shiranui.
Zagashira (座頭)
Voiced by: Takashi Nagasako (Japanese); Carl Masterson (English)
Zagashira simply means the head of the troop. His real name remains unknown. The manager of the Yuyama Troupe, Zagashira looks after the group's accounts. He used to work for Kakunojo's father. Zagashira saved Kakunojo from the fire that destroyed her household.
Kobako (こばこ)
Voiced by: Yuki Matsuoka (Japanese); Brittney Karbowski (English)
One of the child actors of the Yuyama Troupe, Kobako, along with Benimaru, was saved by Yojiro from a near fatal incident, and are both grateful to him for saving their lives.
Benimaru (紅丸)
Voiced by: Etsuko Kozakura (Japanese); Kalin Coates (English)
One of the child actors of the Yuyama Troupe, Benimaru, along with Kobako, was saved by Yojiro from a near fatal incident, and are both grateful to him for saving their lives.

=== Shogunate and Imperial forces ===
Takamori Saigo (西郷隆盛, Saigō Takamori)
Voiced by: Hiromi Sugino (Japanese); Rob Mungle (English)
The chief of staff of the newly formed fully modernized Imperial Army (or the New Government Army) and a samurai from Satsuma. Under the authority of Prince Arisugawa, he was in charge of capturing Edo where the 15th Shogun Tokugawa Yoshinobu resides. Takamori is a firm believer in the privileges of the samurai class.
Kaishu Katsu (勝海舟, Katsu Kaishū)
Voiced by: Shouto Kashii (Japanese); David Wald (English)
The chief of staff of the Shogun's Edo army and a native of Edo city. He was working desperately to avoid bloodshed in Edo. With support from the British and French representatives, he arranged a meeting with Takamori in Edo to negotiate for peace on behalf of the Shogun Tokugawa Yoshinobu. He was formerly the Navy Magistrate of the Shogun's Navy. Katsu was mentor to Ryoma (who initially attempted to kill him, however, instead became his bodyguard).
Ryoma Sakamoto (坂本龍馬, Sakamoto Ryōma)
Voiced by: Kōichi Yamadera (Japanese); Andrew Love (English)
A famous liberal and progressive samurai from Tosa, Ryoma was greatly respected by Yojiro, who was his bodyguard and close confidant. Ryoma negotiated an alliance between Satsuma and Chōshū, two Imperialist clans who had traditionally been bitter rivals towards each other. However, he was later assassinated in a Kyoto inn in 1867.
Tsuginosuke Kawai (河井継之助, Kawai Tsuginosuke)
Voiced by: Takeharu Onishi (Japanese); Mark X. Laskowski (English)
A retainer of the Nagaoka clan in North East Japan, Kawai arrives in Yokohama to purchase two Gatling guns in order to ensure the armed neutrality between the Shogunate and Imperial forces that was maintained by the Nagaoka clan. During the Boshin War, Kawai fled to Aizu after the Nagaoka Province has fallen, but he died in the line of battle just as Enomoto's fleet left Shinagawa to assist in the war.
Tatsugoro Shinmon (新門辰五郎, Shinmon Tatsugoro)
Voiced by: Naoki Bandō (Japanese); Andy McAvin (English)
A dear friend of Katsu and part of the final Tokugawa Shogun who left for Ito in preparation for the Battle of Ueno.
Masujiro Omura (大村益次郎, Ōmura Masujiro)
Voiced by: Hiroshi Kawaguchi (Japanese); Christopher Ayres (English)
The famous tactician who first met with Saigo to discuss the attack on Ueno. He was assassinated a year after the Battle of Ueno was won by the Imperial Army with the use of Armstrong breech-loading cannons.
Ryōsuke Kuroda (黒田了介, Kuroda Ryōsuke)
Voiced by: Minoru Inaba (Japanese); Mark X. Laskowski (English)
Captain of the CSS Stonewall. He attempted to ambush Hijikata by pretending to surrender the CSS Stonewall to the Republic of Ezo. Also, he had to transport Yojiro to Ezo unharmed as a favor from Saigo. Due to the failure in his attempt, he and his men lost in the Battle of Miyako Bay. Yojiro and Hijikata reunite as they return to Hakodate.

=== Jubei's faction ===
Jubei Nakaiya (中居屋重兵衛, Nakaiya Jūbē)
Voiced by: Tetsuo Komura (Japanese); John Swasey (English)
A mysterious Yokohama merchant formerly known as Sennosuke Kuroiwa, Jubei was presumed to be dead after the fire at his company headquarters the Bronze Palace in 1861. Jubei mysteriously reappeared in 1868 in a secret auction inside the Shanghai Club trying to sell the Head of the Conqueror. He sent Hario to protect Kawai and the Gatling guns the latter bought during the same auction. Jubei seemed to know about the Ansei Purges, and was well acquainted with British merchant Glover, from whom he acquires his weapons. His death occurred when the Yuyama Troupe performed at the pier of Fort Shinagawa, while he was chained to a canoe by Ebisu and bombed by the elite British soldiers.
Hario Genba (針尾玄藩)
Voiced by: Hiromi Sugino (Japanese); George Manley (English)
A swordsman who murdered Kakunojo's parents and attempted to kill her, whose face was forever to be remembered by Ebisu. Hario is a bearer of the ancient earth-splitting sword technique, which attempts to create a continuous fissure within the earth's surface as a result of the vertical movement of one's sword, but which is stopped with the application of water within its path. He later serves in Yokohama as Kawai's bodyguard, as ordered by Jubei, and is instantly recognized by Ebisu, who moves to inform the rest of the troupe and later traces him to an underground auction held in the Shanghai Club, where Hario had been accompanying Kawai. After witnessing Yojiro's attempt to destroy the Hasha no Kubi, Hario becomes very intrigued with Yojiro and attempts to find and kill him the next day, to the extent of even ignoring his job to protect Kawai and his Gatling guns. Later, Hario is cornered by Yojiro and the Yuyama Troupe in the midst of a sun-brazen wheat field. When they attempt to kill him, a sniper named Magozo, sent by Jubei, attempts to shoot him, and Hario soon dies.
Magozo Saiga (雑賀孫蔵, Saiga Magozō)
Voiced by: Tomohisa Aso (Japanese); Christopher Ayres (English)
A sniper who worked for Jubei, Magozo was first seen firing a critical shot at Hario, as per Jubei's orders. He was a descendant of the Saiga Ikki warrior clan, who once rebelled against Nobunaga Oda during the Sengoku period. He was stabbed through the chest by Yojiro during a play performed by the Yuyama Troupe at the Stone Crane Mansion.
T.B. Glover (T･B・グラバー, T･B・Gurabā)
Voiced by: Tōru Ōkawa (Japanese); Scotty Fulks (English)
A Scottish arms merchant and industrialist based in Nagasaki. He works closely with Jubei and often supplies him weapons, including Magozo's sniping rifle.
Meifu Hata (覇多冥風, Hata Meifu)
Voiced by: Naoki Bandō (Japanese); Josh Grelle (English)
A sorcerer who worked for Jubei, Meifu was first seen in a dungeon as he uses the Head of the Conqueror to control Kurota, Kaen and Gensai in many attempts to kill Yojiro and obtain the Moon Tear Sword. He is killed by Sotetsu at Sunpu Castle, following a failed attempt to use the Head of the Conqueror to have Saigo and Katsu oppose each other against their will.
Kurota Karasuma (鴉丸九郎太, Karasuma Kurota)
Voiced by: Masahiro Ogata (Japanese); Kalob Martinez (English)
One of three highly-skilled samurais who were summoned by Jubei then controlled by Meifu using the Head of the Conqueror in many attempts to kill Yojiro and obtain the Moon Tear Sword. He is ultimately slashed by Yojiro at the Stone Crane Mansion, but then shot by Kanna when he attempts to reawaken.
Kaen Ryu (劉火袁, Ryu Kaen)
Voiced by: Masahiro Ogata (Japanese); Mark X. Laskowski (English)
One of three highly-skilled samurais who were summoned by Jubei then controlled by Meifu using the Head of the Conqueror in many attempts to kill Yojiro and obtain the Moon Tear Sword. He is ultimately slashed by Yojiro at the Stone Crane Mansion.
Gensai Hachisuka (蜂須賀彦斉, Hachisuka Gensai)
Voiced by: Masahiro Ogata (Japanese); Kalob Martinez (English)
One of three highly-skilled samurais who were summoned by Jubei then controlled by Meifu using the Head of the Conqueror in many attempts to kill Yojiro and obtain the Moon Tear Sword. He is ultimately slashed by Yojiro at the Stone Crane Mansion.

=== Village of Koma ===
Lord Shoten of Koma (高麗の聖天様, Koma no Shōten-sama)
Voiced by: Kousei Yagi (Japanese); John Kaiser (English)
A well-respected high priest of the Village of Koma in modern day Saitama Prefecture. He is a direct descendant of the 3,000 men and women mission led by Xu Fu, the immortal mage to seal and dispose the Head of the Conqueror in Japan. He enjoys good food and simple village life.
Shinzaemon Tatewaki (帯刀新佐衛門, Tatewaki Shinzaemon)
Voiced by: Dai Matsumoto (Japanese); Brett Weaver (English)
Lord Shoten's caretaker and Yojiro's former mentor. He is the first to send Yojiro on a mission to seal the Head of the Conqueror after Yojiro released its spirit while at the Shanghai Club. He also sensed that Sotetsu bought the clay pot for an ulterior motive. He attempted to duel against Sotetsu, but Sotetsu escaped by rowing away in a canoe.

=== Enomoto's fleet ===
Takeaki Enomoto (榎本武揚, Enomoto Takeaki)
Voiced by: Kazuhiro Nakata (Japanese); Mike Yager (English)
Captain of the flagship Kaiyō Maru, and former Shogunate ships Kaiten Maru and Banryū Maru. He is possessed by the soul of Lord Awa inside the clay pot housing the Head of the Conqueror, during a play performed by the Yuyama Troupe taking place at Fort Shinagawa. Under the influence of the Head of the Conqueror, Enomoto establishes the Republic of Ezo after his fleet successfully takes over Hakodate and Goryōkaku.
Jules Brunet (ジュール・ブリュネ, Jūru Buryūne)
Voiced by: Masashi Hirose (Japanese); Christopher Ayres (English)
A French army officer who joined the fleet in support of Sotetsu's ideals of a revolution. Following the birth of the Republic of Ezo, he leaves the fleet when the crowd of people start behaving like a mob.
Ryoun Takamatsu (高松凌雲, Takamatsu Ryoun)
Voiced by: Endou Moriya (Japanese); Kalob Martinez (English)
A resident doctor aboard the fleet who first saved Kakunojo from a traumatic state when Yojiro first confronted Enomoto and she accidentally knocked Yojiro into the sea, though Yojiro later survived that incident. Ryoun later assists Kakunojo and Tetsunosuke at Hakodate Hospital when the fleet took over Hakodate and Goryōkaku.
Toshizo Hijikata (土方 歳三, Hijikata Toshizō)
Voiced by: Nozomi Hiyama (Japanese); John Gremillion (English)
Shinsengumi's vice-commander. In the past, there was friendship with Yojiro in Kyoto, and they meet again during the Battle of Aizu. He joined the fleet after Sotetsu's cunning convincing in order to lead the ranks to take over Japan. Although he showed his success in the Battle of Shinkansen, he was shot to death by Kanna because he turned the banner against the Head of the Conqueror. In historical fact, it is believed he died after striking a stray bullet.
Tetsunosuke Ichimura (市村 鉄之助, Ichimura Tetsunosuke)
Voiced by: Naomi Shindou (Japanese); Connor Leach (English)
Hijikata's teenage page. He was ordered by Hijikata to take care of Kakunojo while at Hakodate Hospital. He escapes from Hakodate heading toward Hino, the hometown of Hijikata to deliver his master's photo and letter.
Keisuke Otori (大鳥圭介, Otori Keisuke)
Voiced by: Minoru Hirano (Japanese); John Swasey (English)
Minister of the Army. He leads an uprising to kill all merchants making money off the republic. He later sends Enomoto's subordinates to attack Okoma at a pier and ambush Shiranui and Kotoha at a restaurant.

=== Elite British soldiers ===
Sakyonosuke Kanna (神無左京之介, Kanna Sakyōnosuke)
Voiced by: Kousuke Toriumi (Japanese); Clint Bickham (English)
Born in London to a British royal Navy vice admiral father and a Japanese mother, formerly a tayū in Yoshiwara, Kanna was tasked with being the bodyguard of Katsu, as part of a request from Parkes, the head of British mission in Yokohama, and is an extremely talented fighter, armed with two guns, each of the Remington New Model Army Conversion type. He seems to harbor passionate and confused feelings for Kakunojo, who reminds him of his beautiful Japanese mother, whose desertion haunts him. He later becomes an elite British soldier, tasked with the dangerous mission to eliminate Enomoto.
Queen (クイーン, Kuin)
Voiced by: Tomoko Kawakami (Japanese); Caitlynn French (English)
One of four original elite British soldiers. She is the orphaned sister of Rook. Her preferred weapon is the crossbow. She was killed when Enomoto convinced Kanna to shoot her during the raid in the dungeon of the Goryōkaku base.
Bishop (ビショップ, Bishoppu)
Voiced by: Dai Matsumoto (Japanese); George Manley (English)
One of four original elite British soldiers. He is the oldest of the group. His preferred weapon is the staff. He was killed by Hijikata during the raid in the dungeon of the Goryōkaku base.
Knight (ナイト, Naito)
Voiced by: Bifu Hitoshi (Japanese); John Kaiser (English)
One of four original elite British soldiers. He is the largest of the group. His preferred weapons are smoke grenades. He was killed by Sotetsu during the raid in the dungeon of the Goryōkaku base.
Rook (ルーク, Rūku)
Voiced by: Masahito Yabe (Japanese); Greg Ayres (English)
One of four original elite British soldiers. He is the orphaned brother of Queen. His preferred weapons are throwing knives. He was killed by two of Enomoto's men during an attack on the Kaiyō Maru.

=== Other characters ===
Kotoha (琴波)
Voiced by: Mie Sonozaki (Japanese); Carli Mosier (English)
A tayū, highest rank of the oiran, who is the most famed and influential of the Sekkakurō, a pleasure house located in the Yukaku, Yokohama's pleasure quarters. She rivals the famous Yokohama oiran of the time, Kiyu from Gankurō. Her influential clientele include Katsu and Parkes. Kotoha is also a staunch supporter of the Yuyama Troupe, and during a discussion with Sotetsu, arranged for the group to perform during a night at the Sekkakurō. She later works as a waitress at Hakodate, much to Shiranui's surprise.
H.S. Parkes (H･S・パークス, H･S・Pākusu)
Voiced by: Tomomichi Nishimura (Japanese); Brett Weaver (English)
The head of the British mission in Yokohama. He arranges for Kanna to be the bodyguard of Katsu first and Jubei later. He then arranges for Kanna to join the elite British soldiers in the dangerous mission to eliminate Enomoto.
Tesshu Yamaoka (山岡鉄舟, Yamaoka Tesshuu)
Voiced by: Tōru Ōkawa (Japanese); Mark X. Laskowski (English)
One of two messengers sent to deliver a secret letter to form an alliance with the emperor, but are halted by Sotetsu on their way to Sunpu Castle. A sudden earthquake caused this letter to be undelivered, thus a stalemate to an era. He, along with Masumitsu, are later sent to deliver a message to not make Edo a battlefield, but they arrive there too late. It is thanks to their desperate action that the meeting between Saigo and Katsu became reality. Yamaoka survived during the Battle of Ueno.
Kyunosuke Masumitsu (山岡鉄舟, Masumitsu Kyuunosuke)
Voiced by: Masato Amada (Japanese); Christopher Ayres (English)
One of two messengers sent to deliver a secret letter to form an alliance with the emperor, but are halted by Sotetsu on their way to Sunpu Castle. A sudden earthquake caused this letter to be undelivered, thus a stalemate to an era. He, along with Yamaoka, are later sent to deliver a message to not make Edo a battlefield, but they arrive there too late. It is thanks to their desperate action that the meeting between Saigo and Katsu became reality. Masumitsu died during the Battle of Ueno.
Oryo (おりょう, Oryou)
Voiced by: Rei Dan (Japanese); Tiffany Grant (English)
Ryoma's lover and Yojiro's friend. She was aware of the Head of the Conqueror always wandering around Ryoma when Yojiro was asked to be Ryoma's bodyguard. At the time that the Yuyama Troupe was disbanded, Oryo crosses paths with Sotetsu while leaving Yokohama. She gives a box of scripts to the troupe, where they resumed their performances in Edo.
Soji Okita (沖田 総司, Okita Sōji)
Voiced by: Takuma Takeyama (Japanese); Leraldo Anzaldua (English)
Shinsengumi's first squad captain. He has a past with meeting Yojiro at the Sato Dojo when they were younger, but in the end he is held in Yojiro's arm due to gradual illness, leaving his will to Hijikata and taking his final breath. In historical fact, Okita leaves the world without knowing the death of Isami Kondō, but in this work he is informed of the fact from Yojiro.
Okoma (お駒)
Voiced by: Maya Okamoto (Japanese); Luci Christian (English)
One of three traveling geishas who encounters Yojiro and Kakunojo at the Utsunomiya Inn, where she secretly gives Yojiro a letter written by Lord Shoten, leading Yojiro to an underground shrine hidden behind a waterfall where the second Moon Tear Sword is guarded by the ghost warriors. Okoma is later seen at a cemetery outside the Goryōkaku base, tasked to deliver a letter to Katsu for Shiranui and Kotoha.

== Anime ==
The series was broadcast between October 6, 2006, and April 6, 2007, on the Japanese Internet streaming channel, GyaO. The opening theme is "Kōya Ruten" (荒野流転; lit. 'The Vicissitudes of Wilderness') by FictionJunction Yuuka while the ending theme is "Ai no Tsurugi" (愛の剣; lit. Swords of Love) by Takako & The Crazy Boys. The anime is licensed by Sentai Filmworks in North America, and they released the series to Blu-ray and DVD on September 4, 2012, for episodes 1-13 and November 27, 2012, for episodes 14–26.

=== Episodes ===
No.	Title	Original release date
1	"A Foul Star in the Sky"; Transliteration: "Kyou Hoshi Hashiru" (Japanese: 凶星奔る)	October 6, 2006
Tesshu Yamaoka and Kyunosuke Masumitsu, messengers sent to deliver a secret letter to form an alliance with the emperor, are halted by Sotetsu Ibaragi on their way to Sunpu Castle. A sudden earthquake caused this letter to be undelivered, thus a stalemate to an era. The Yokohama Foreign Merchant Area opened up to the world in a time of economic expansion in 1853, in which the Japanese lived in the west and the foreigners lived in the east. Yojiro Akizuki breaks up a fight between pairs of gunmen and swordsmen in the streets. He is introduced to the Yuyama Troupe, an adventuring kabuki group, who show appreciation for him rescuing Benimaru and Kobako, the children of the troupe. However, Yojiro leaves them in disinterest. After the Yuyama Troupe advertise their next performance, Jubei Nakaiya assigns Hario Genba as the bodyguard of Tsuginosuke Kawai upon his arrival. After recognizing Hario, Ebisu no Zukin reports to the troupe that Kawai will be at the Shanghai Club. At an underground auction, a bid for two Gatling guns is sold to Kawai. When Jubei tries to sell the Head of the Conqueror, Yojiro cuts it in half, consequently setting the building in flames.
2	"The Earth-Splitting Sword Laughs"; Transliteration: "Jiwari Ken Warau" (Japanese: 地割剣嗤う)	October 13, 2006
Yojiro wakes up in the Yuyama Theater, where he is interrogated by the troupe for his interference, but he leaves in silence. Hario finds and follows Yojiro to a shrine. After realizing that Hario can perform an earth-splitting sword technique, Yojiro uses well water to escape the blow. Yojiro returns to the troupe to request his service as their bodyguard. At night, Hario guards the Gatling guns that are being transported through a forest. Meanwhile, Zagashira explains to Yojiro that Hario took part in the Ansei Purges, committing arson to households, which explains why Zagashira first started an adventuring kabuki group. Yojiro destroys one of the Gatling guns after Hario uses it to shoot down the area. Hario goes after Yojiro into a marsh, rendering the earth-splitting sword technique useless. The rest of the troupe surround Hario, but he is ultimately sniped by Magozo Saiga. Elsewhere, Sotetsu takes Kawai to carry the remaining Gatling gun onto a cargo ship, in order to ensure the armed neutrality between the Shogunate and Imperial forces that was maintained by the Nagaoka clan. Jubei later tells Magozo and T.B. Glover that Sotetsu is the playwright of the Yuyama Troupe.
3	"Ballad of Stone Crane Mansion"; Transliteration: "Sekkakurō Dodoitsu" (Japanese: 石鶴楼都々逸)	October 20, 2006
Yojiro visits the Village of Koma, where he has a friendly duel with Shinzaemon Tatewaki, before reporting to Lord Shoten of Koma. Tatewaki is made aware that Yojiro cut the Head of the Conqueror, but failed to eradicate its spirit. It is now up to Yojiro to seal the Head of the Conqueror. After Kakunojo Yuyama questions Sotetsu concerning their next performance as rather violent, Shiranui Kozo realizes that there is an opposite side of the story, just as Sotetsu mentions. As news of this performance reaches Jubei, he plans to end this performance before any secrets get out. After Kaishu Katsu and Kotoha enjoy a drink of sake together, H.S. Parkes arrives and presents Katsu with Sakyonosuke Kanna as his bodyguard. At night, a parade is held. Kakunojo advertises a play of revenge which will start the next day at the Stone Crane Mansion, while the rest of the troupe hand out flyers. Before Magozo can target Kakunojo in the crowd, Yojiro intercepts and chases after him. When the rest of the troupe catch up, Mogozo is cornered at a riverbank.
4	"Anecdote of an Underhanded Scandal"; Transliteration: "Ura Gigoku Ibun" (Japanese: 裏疑獄異聞)	October 27, 2006
Magozo fires at smoke bombs in order to make his escape. Yojiro departs before Benimaru and Kobako can properly thank him for saving Kakunojo. On the next day, while the troupe give their first performance of when Hario is introduced, Yojiro tells Sotetsu that the troupe are rather stiff with their delivery. At night, Benimaru delivers a letter to Yojiro, requesting him to see Katsu, who is unsure whether or not the earthquake is a good sign during a time of political negotiations. After hearing about the second performance concerning Hario's involvement in the Ansei Purges, Jubei plans to stop the troupe from going any further. On the following day, the troupe prepare for their third performance, where they reveal the scene when Hario was sniped. Yojiro finds Magozo above stage, but Magozo uses a revolver to defend himself and escape backstage. Before Magozo can reach Kakunojo and get a clear shot, the police show up to interrupt the performance. However, as Magozo recklessly charges at Kakunojo, Yojiro stabs Magozo through the chest. When Magozo attempts to fire at smoke bombs that he planted on the ceiling, Kanna ricochets the shot with his own bullet.
5	"Shureiki Unleashed"; Transliteration: "Shureiki Hanataru" (Japanese: 守霊鬼放たる)	November 3, 2006
In a dungeon, Jubei summons Kurota Karasuma, Kaen Ryu and Gensai Hachisuka, while Meifu Hata binds Kurota, Kaen and Gensai in chains and controls them using the Head of the Conqueror. Meanwhile, Katsu visits Kotoha, as they talk about how impressive the troupe's performances have been thus far. Once Kotoha leaves, Katsu tells his men that he wants to solicit the English to help them drive their armed forces back from Edo, which might be blindly leaping them into a viper's nest. Parkes accidentally bumps into a grumpy samurai, but Kotoha manages to dissolve the situation. When the troupe come to give an outstanding performance at the Ushioza, Kakunojo is surprised to learn that Kotoha received an anonymous tip for the venue despite her generous invite. The performance is soon interrupted by Kurota, Kaen and Gensai, who all have a desire to kill. As most of the crowd evacuates, Kakashi no Keishin struggles to fight back, but proves to be too weak. After Yojiro and Sotetsu are surrounded by Kurota, Kaen and Gensai inside the Ushioza, Parkes summons his British soldiers to rehearse a march outside for the crowd, causing Kurota, Kaen and Gensai to retreat from hearing the bagpipes.
6	"The Closing Performance Burns"; Transliteration: "Rakubi Moyu" (Japanese: 楽日燃ゆ)	November 10, 2006
Jubei plans to show something to Kanna, who made an unexpectedly arrival and is eager to shoot. Meanwhile, the troupe advertise and prepare for the last performance of their series. In the dungeon where Meifu continues to chant incantations, Jubei reveals to Kanna that Yojiro possesses the Moon Tear Sword, the only blade capable of sealing the Head of the Conqueror. Tatsugoro Shinmon visits Katsu and Kotoha, who encourage Tatsugoro to watch the upcoming performance, hinting that politics can have an opposite side to a story. Later, while the performance commences in the Stone Crane Mansion, a group of tengu masked samurais confine all the tayūs and customers inside the Ushioza. The tayūs and customers escape when the British soldiers show up to gun down the samurais, who set fire to the Ushioza. The performance unveils that Jubei was presumed dead during the Ansei Purges. Kurota, Kaen and Gensai suddenly appear, causing the crowd to quickly leave. Yojiro slashes Kurota, Kaen and Gensai, while Kanna briefly arrives to shoot Kurota when he attempts to reawaken. In the aftermath, Yamaoka and Masumitsu are sent to deliver a message to not make Edo a battlefield, but they arrive there too late.
7	"Sotetsu Moves"; Transliteration: "Sōtetsu Ugoku" (Japanese: 蒼鉄動く)	November 17, 2006
As the Eastern Army prepares to invade Edo, it is thanks to the desperate action of Yamaoka and Masumitsu that the meeting between Takamori Saigo and Katsu became reality. Although their play of revenge was successful, the troupe become upset with the timing of Kanna during their last performance, especially when they revealed the truth behind Jubei. With Sotetsu at the Village of Koma without the troupe's knowledge, Kakunojo, Shiranui, Ebisu and Zagashira discuss how Sotetsu first helped them reveal the truth through his playwright skills. Meanwhile, Sotetsu purchases a special clay pot and secretly meets with Jubei to discuss matters with the Head of the Conqueror. Tatewaki later finds Sotetsu, interrogating him about the clay pot while they duel with swords. Sotetsu manages to escape by jumping off a bridge and rowing off in a canoe. During the meeting in Sunpu Castle, Katsu convinces Saigo to not enter into war, and they bring out a drink of sake together after reaching an agreement. However, Kanna infiltrates the room and points guns at both Katsu and Saigo. Jubei enters with the Head of the Conqueror and sits in a nearby room, turning Katsu and Saigo against each other.
8	"Satisfactions for Revenge Achieved"; Transliteration: "Katakiuchi Honkai Naru" (Japanese: 仇討本懐なる)	November 24, 2006
The troupe start a large-scale public disturbance, known as the Why Not Phenomenon: Ee ja nai ka, heading towards Sunpu Castle. During this distraction, the troupe make their way inside to search for the room containing Katsu and Saigo, who continue to argue against their will, much to Jubei's amusement. Meanwhile, Sotetsu finds his way in Sunpu Castle inside a distant room, preparing the clay pot for unknown reasons. Once Yojiro finds and fights Kanna, Yojiro makes use of candles and walls from the hallways as an advantage against Kanna. When Yojiro finally pins down Kanna, smoke begins to arise, prompting Yojiro to leave. The Head of the Conqueror influences Katsu and Saigo into a duel with swords, but the smoke engulfs the spirit of the Head of the Conqueror back into the clay pot, reverting Katsu and Saigo back to normal. After the troupe assemble, Sotetsu stabs Meifu before escaping with the clay pot. Jubei is stabbed by Ebisu and shot by Kanna. Before rowing off with the clay pot, Sotetsu releases ghost warriors at Yojiro to protect the Head of the Conqueror from being sealed. Katsu and Saigo agree to not turn Edo into a sea of fire.
9	"The Black Cat Cries"; Transliteration: "Kuroneko naku" (Japanese: 黒猫哭く)	December 1, 2006
In the Ueno Kan'ei Temple, on April 11, fourth year of Keiō, the final Tokugawa Shogun left for Ito. Saigo met with famous tactician Masujiro Omura to discuss the attack on Ueno. Oryo is given a boat ride by Glover to Yokohama, and she seeks shelter in the Yuyama Theater when it begins to rain. Soji Okita is attacked by officers, but Yojiro intervenes and saves Okita from committing seppuku. Yojiro and Okita were once acquaintances in kendo at Sato Dojo in Tama. In Edo, on April 30, fourth year of Keiō, Katsu visits Tatsugoro, who states that there will be bloodshed no matter what happens. Okita recuperates under Yojiro's care at Uekiya Heigoro's home in Sendagaya. Oryo tells Kakunojo and Zagashira about when Yojiro first became the bodyguard of Ryoma Sakamoto. Tatewaki explains to Lord Shoten that Yojiro guarded Ryoma because the presence of the Head of the Conqueror was always nearby. In Ōmiya, on November 15, third year of Keiō, this presence went somewhere else, diverting Yojiro away while Ryoma was killed by an unknown assailant. Before dawn, on May 15, fourth year of Keiō, Yojiro chases after Okita, who is walking straight into a battlefield.
10	"Ueno Falls"; Transliteration: "Ueno Otsu" (Japanese: 上野陥つ)	December 8, 2006
As the Battle of Ueno begins throughout early morning at the Kuro Gate, Omura is confident that a secret weapon will be delivered from Yokohama Port soon. Oryo leaves Yokohama, not long before realizing that Kakunojo has feelings for Yojiro. Meanwhile, Yojiro catches up to Okita, who then draws his sword. However, Yojiro defends himself with his sword and knocks out Okita. Kakunojo officially disbands the troupe, seeing that their revenge is over. At Edo Port, Omura commands the Imperial Army to fire Armstrong breech-loading cannons against the Shougi Army, turning the battle in favor of the Imperial Army. Masumitsu was killed in the battle at just 28 years old, while Omura was assassinated in the following year. Okita asks Yojiro for one final kendo match, but Yojiro steps out to find a doctor when Okita becomes ill again. Just then, the officers arrive to apprehend Okita, but Yojiro comes to the rescue. Okita dies in Yojiro's arms soon after. Oryo crosses paths with Sotetsu, who gives her a box of scripts to deliver to the troupe. This means that the troupe is back in business, and their next stop will be in Edo.
11	"The Troupe at a Provisional Stage Again"; Transliteration: "Ichiza Futatabi Kari Yagura" (Japanese: 一座ふたたび仮櫓)	December 15, 2006
On August, fourth year of Keiō, ten days after, Edo is renamed "Tokyo". The troupe arrive at Edo Port, where they are greeted by Kotoha and Tatsugoro. At Shinagawa, the troupe take a break from constructing a theater. Meanwhile, Sotetsu meets with Takeaki Enomoto on his flagship Kaiyō Maru to join his cause in rebuilding the Tokugawa family. Enomoto takes Sotetsu to see Jubei, who is still alive, and Kanna is there as Jubei's bodyguard. With the theater nearly complete, the troupe find out from the scripts that there is an Eternal Assassin as a role. Meanwhile, Yojiro is attacked by ghost warriors through the fog while he trains outside a shrine, but the sunlight causes them to vanish. Enomoto prepares to set sail for the Nagaoka Province in order to assist Kawai in the ongoing Boshin War. After the troupe rehearse, the ghost warriors reappear. Yojiro arrives to protect the troupe, saying that the ghost warriors are weak against fire and urging the troupe to grab torches. After the ghost warriors vanish, Yojiro says that the ghost warriors are gone, but not killed.
12	"Ryoma's Message"; Transliteration: "Ryōma no Kotodzume" (Japanese: 龍馬之言伝)	December 22, 2006
The troupe begin their first performance inside the theater, revealing that the Moon Tear Sword was forged to seal the Head of the Conqueror. In a flashback, when Yojiro was diverted away from an inn, Ryoma was attacked by Shinta, but Ryoma managed to kill Shinta before passing away himself. Kakunojo tells Yojiro that the Head of the Conqueror has been wandering around Ryoma and waiting to possess him, something that Oryo knew about. Yojiro blames himself for Ryoma's death, which is why he is choosing his own path. On the Kaiyō Maru, Jules Brunet tells Enomoto that he trusts neither Kanna nor Sotetsu. Kawai has now fled to Aizu after the Nagaoka Province has fallen. At the Takanawa Reception Area, Parkes is responsible for Kanna now guarding Jubei. Kanna later finds Sotetsu at Edo Port, where Kanna shoots at Sotetsu when the latter ignores the former. Yojiro shortly arrives and realizes that Sotetsu might be influenced by the Head of the Conqueror. As the ghost warriors return, Kanna protects Kakunojo when she also arrives. Sotetsu lights a match to make the ghost warriors disappear, and he departs to write another script based on how the others acted.
13	"The Head of the Conqueror with a Soul"; Transliteration: "Hasha no Kubi Nyuukon" (Japanese: 覇者の首入魂)	December 29, 2006
The troupe advertise their second performance taking place at night. Meanwhile, Enomoto chooses to wait at sea while the war in the north is still ongoing. Yojiro decides to join the play as the Eternal Assassin, since he is after the Head of the Conqueror. At Fort Shinagawa, Jubei demands Sotetsu to hand over the Head of the Conqueror, while Kanna points a gun at Sotetsu. During the second performance, the troupe debut Yojiro as the Eternal Assassin. Yojiro tears down the upper stage, which leads to the pier of Fort Shinagawa. Yojiro charges at Kanna into the sea, which allows time for Jubei to activate the ghost warriors from the Head of the Conqueror to attack the troupe. Just then, Parkes has Knight, Queen, Rook and Bishop, the elite British soldiers, bomb the pier, prompting Yojiro to protect Kakunojo. Ebisu chains Jubei to a canoe, and both are bombed as a result. At the same time, Kanna reaches for the Head of the Conqueror in the sea, but Yojiro destroys the clay pot. The soul of Lord Awa is released and chooses Enomoto as its new vessel. Enomoto prepares the former Shogunate Fleet to set sail to the north.
14	"To the North"; Transliteration: "Kita e" (Japanese: 北へ)	January 12, 2007
Enomoto tells Brunet and his men that they may face death as they are headed to the north. Kawai died in the line of battle just as Enomoto's fleet left Shinagawa. The troupe hold a funeral for Ebisu, while Yojiro thinks back to when he first told Sotetsu about his mission of sealing the Head of the Conqueror at all costs, not knowing Sotetsu planned for the current events to put into place. Meanwhile, Kanna confronts Parkes, since Parkes had the elite British soldiers attempt to bomb Kanna, who tried to retrieve the Head of Conqueror from the sea. However, Kanna stands down after learning that the order came from the queen of England. Kanna joins the elite British soldiers, who find him oddly different since he prefers guns as his weapons. Kakunojo leaves the troupe to find Yojiro, much to the worry of Kobako and Benimaru. Suspicious that Sotetsu is plotting something, Brunet has his men surround Sotetsu with swords. Sotetsu calmly states that he desires a revolution, something Brunet also desires. Off the coast of Shinagawa, Kanna and the elite British soldiers infiltrate and commandeer a French naval supply ship, as they also head to the north.
15	"The Secret Sword Resonates"; Transliteration: "Hitou Kyoumeisu" (Japanese: 秘刀共鳴す)	January 19, 2007
Kakunojo catches up to Yojiro in a forest, not long before she breaks one of her sandals. Okoma, one of three traveling geishas passing by, lends Kakunojo a replacement sandal before they depart. Yojiro and Kakunojo stay at the Utsunomiya Inn, where they run into the three geishas. The three perform on their shamisens in front of the guests, inviting Kakunojo to participate in dance. Okoma gives Yojiro a letter written by Lord Shoten, urging Yojiro to run off without telling Kakunojo. Under a red shining star at night, Yojiro finds a secret cave hidden inside a waterfall, which leads to an underground shrine where the Head of the Conqueror was once sealed in the past. As Yojiro is outmatched against ghost warriors, Kakunojo finally traces Yojiro to the underground shrine. She becomes drawn to a second Moon Tear Sword left at the altar and grasps it, causing light to emit from Yojiro's sword. This allows Yojiro to cut through the ghost warriors. After Yojiro then destroys the helmet left at the altar, he and Kakunojo make their escape as the shrine is destroyed from the inside. Kakunojo decides to join Yojiro in his path.
16	"Accompaniment of the Four"; Transliteration: "Doukou Yonin" (Japanese: 同行四人)	January 26, 2007
The ongoing Boshin War intensifies as the New Government Army defeats many allied provinces in order to reach the border of Aizu. On August 21, fourth year of Keiō, Toshizo Hijikata arrives at the Bonari Pass during the Battle of Aizu. The former Shogunate Forces withdraw to Aizuwakamatsu Castle due to the New Government Army's fierce attack. Meanwhile, Yojiro takes Kakunojo to a private room to recuperate, following an incident when she fainted in the forest. Yojiro and Kakunojo head to a creek, where they rescue Sonosuke Goto from some New Government Army soldiers. After arriving, Hijikata is told by Yojiro that Okita is now dead. Despite Hijikata saying that Yonezawa is currently controlled by the Satsuma and Chōshū Forces, Sonosuke plans to go there. However, Kakunojo suggests that the four of them should travel together. At Yonezawa, Sonosuke runs off after saying that his sister is married. Yojiro and Hijikata create a distraction by pretending to duel, attracting nearby soldiers to watch. Sonosuke has no more regrets after finally seeing his sister one last time. After the four reunite, Sonosuke chooses to depart and risk his life in the Battle of Aizu.
17	"Unnecessary Deliberation"; Transliteration: "Hakaru Muyou Nari" (Japanese: 議無用なり)	February 2, 2007
In Matsushima, Yojiro and Kakunojo stay at a temple owned by Kazunao Sainen. Enomoto has locked himself inside a room in the Kaiyō Maru. On September 1, fourth year of Keiō, Hijikata attends a council of war at Aoba Castle in Sendai with representatives of the alliance provinces, who are on the verge of dissolution due to the attacks by the New Government Army. Sotetsu is impressed when Hijikata scolds the other representatives for surrendering so easily. Yojiro remembers when Enomoto was first possessed by the soul of Lord Awa after the clay pot was destroyed, but Kakunojo finds him, saying that the scenery outside is beautiful. Although Yojiro believes that Kakunojo should not share his path, Kakunojo believes that they have already been on the same path since their first encounter. A desperate Kakunojo retrieves her sword from the temple and challenges Yojiro to a duel in hopes of reaching an understanding. Meanwhile, the elite British soldiers sneak abroad the Kaiyō Maru, but Enomoto scares them away with cannons. Hijikata confronts Sotetsu during this time when Sotetsu states that Tokugawa will fall, but Hijikata agrees to join the fleet after hearing the cannons in the distance.
18	"Pathetic Destiny"; Transliteration: "Shukumei Aware Nari" (Japanese: 宿命哀れなり)	February 9, 2007
The elite British soldiers stage a comeback onto the Kaiyō Maru, but are unable to defeat Enomoto. Luckily, Kanna arrives to save them, but he is unable to pull the trigger on Enomoto. Yojiro senses the presence of the Head of the Conqueror from afar, while Hijikata signs his name on Sotetsu's unofficial list of fleet members before leaving. On September 15, first year of Meiji, the allied provinces surrender to the New Government Army. Yojiro and Kakunojo cross swords one last time, as they now have reached an understanding in their destiny of sharing the same path. Yojiro and Kakunojo leave the temple, while Hijikata prepares to meet the new recruits, with Yojiro and Kakunojo among them. Kanna and the elite British soldiers attack Enomoto's fleet, but Enomoto commands his men to fight back. After Rook is stabbed in the chest, Kanna orders the rest of the elite British soldiers to retreat. As Yojiro and Kakunojo arrives on the flagship to confront Enomoto, Yojiro is suddenly stabbed by Kakunojo, since her sword prevents the Head of the Conqueror from being sealed. Yojiro falls overboard, Enomoto celebrates his victory and Kakunojo cries in agony.
19	"Bright Inverted Pentagram"; Transliteration: "Kakugyaku no Gobousei" (Japanese: 赫逆の五芒星)	February 16, 2007
While Kakunojo is still left traumatized, Ryoun Takamatsu prepares to give her some medicine to calm down. On October 20, first year of Meiji, Enomoto's fleet lands at Ezo Uchura Bay in Washinoki, dividing into two line squads into Hakodate and Goryōkaku. By the time they reached Hakodate, governor Kinnaru Shimizudani already fled from Goryōkaku. Enomoto's fleet decided to use Goryōkaku as a base to launch a counterattack against the New Government Army. At Hakodate Hospital, Hijikata orders Tetsunosuke Ichimura to take care of Kakunojo, much to Tetsunosuke's dismay. The next day, Kakunojo stops herself from throwing her sword into the sea when Sotetsu tells her that Yojiro is still alive. While Shiranui finds Kotoha working as a waitress at the local restaurant, Kakashi, Zagashira, Kobako and Benimaru travel to Hakodate Port. The four reunite with Sotetsu, who tells them that Kakunojo is in town. Later, members of the Yuguntai show up outside Hakodate Hospital with the intention of ambushing Hijikata, who is currently at the base with Enomoto, Sotetsu and Brunet discussing their plan to attack Matsumae. Kakunojo protects Tetsunosuke from being killed, and the rest of the troupe show up, forcing the Yuguntai to retreat.
20	"There Were Waves"; Transliteration: "Harou Arite" (Japanese: 波浪ありて)	February 23, 2007
Enomoto's fleet travel across the Matsumae Sea on former Shogunate ship Kaiten Maru towards Fukuyama Castle at Matsumae Province. Hijikata's men, who already have traveled on the Banryū Maru to the northern lands, await their next plan of action. Two weeks before the assault on Matsumae, Yojiro is washed up at the shore of Mutsu Iwaji Village in Mutsunokuni, where he is being nurtured by Mitsu and her daughter Riku. Mitsu tells Yojiro that she decided to hate her husband for choosing to fight in the ongoing Boshin War. Yojiro later finds Riku's shoe by the shore, deducing that she fell into the ocean, but Mitsu prevents him from diving into the dangerous waters. Enomoto blasts the cannons at Fukuyama Castle despite the snowy weather, allowing Hijikata's men entry inside Karamete Gate. On November 5, first year of Meiji, Fukuyama Castle falls in the hands of Enomoto's fleet. After Mitsu retrieves Riku from the ocean, Mitsu reveals that the ocean waves are consistent, no matter how much she hates them since childhood. Mitsu's husband returns to the village, where he is tearfully greeted by Mitsu and Riku. On November 15, first year of Meiji, the Republic of Ezo is born.
21	"Crossing Over the Strait"; Transliteration: "Kaikyou wo Wataru" (Japanese: 海峡渡る)	March 2, 2007
On March, second year of Meiji, the New Government Army prepares to send an ironclad warship called the CSS Stonewall after the Republic of Ezo conquered Goryōkaku. Three months earlier, Shiranui, Kakashi and Zagashira are surprised when Kobako and Benimaru find bullets at Hakodate Port, hinting that Ezo might soon turn into a battlefield. At Toukei Castle, Lord Shoten and Tatewaki visit Katsu and Saigo, asking them to have someone take Yojiro to Ezo. During his travels, Yojiro meets Ryōsuke Kuroda, who invites him to join the CSS Stonewall. In the present, Hijikata hears word that Kuroda will surrender the CSS Stonewall. As the officials of the republic believe this to be a trap set by Kuroda, Hijikata takes the risk and sets sail. On March 25, second year of Meiji, Yojiro and Kuroda are onboard the CSS Stonewall at Miyako Bay, as the Kaiten Maru and the Banryū Maru approach them. After Hijikata boards the CSS Stonewall, Kuroda gives the signal for his soldiers to attack in betrayal. During the crossfire, Kuroda remembers when Saigo told him to transport Yojiro to Ezo unharmed. On March 26, second year of Meiji, Yojiro and Hijikata reunite as they return to Hakodate.
22	"An Encounter in the North"; Transliteration: "Kita no Kaikou" (Japanese: 北の邂逅)	March 9, 2007
The failure for the republic to steal the CSS Stonewall was known as the Battle of Miyako Bay, but the true intention of the New Government Army was to use the CSS Stonewall as bait to kidnap Hijikata, who instead put a stop to this plan despite his badly injured comrades. At Hakodate Port, Yojiro parts ways with Hijikata and travels towards Goryōkaku by foot. Meanwhile, Shiranui is surprised when Kotoha is doing business in Ezo. At the north gate in the former Shogunate military fortress, the Yuguntai lead an attack on Goryōkaku. At the base, Enomoto, Hijikata and Brunet lead a counterattack on horseback, while Sotetsu heads to Hakodate Hospital and takes Kakunojo with him to the battlefield. Upon arriving, Yojiro senses the Head of the Conqueror within Enomoto, but Kakunojo blocks Yojiro as they cross swords, scaring away the Yuguntai. Sotetsu entrusts Kakunojo to protect Enomoto in rebuilding the republic, something Yojiro has yet to understand. While Kakunojo gives a performance to express her dedication in rebuilding the republic, Enomoto gives a speech to encourage the crowd to join them in their cause.
23	"Hakodate is Red"; Transliteration: "Hakodate wa Akaku" (Japanese: 函館はあかく)	March 16, 2007
Parkes relieves Kanna, Knight, Queen and Bishop from their current mission, calling them pathetic soldiers and ripping off their embroidered patches. While traveling on a ship with Kanna and the other elite British soldiers, Queen mourns the loss of Rook, revealed to be her brother growing up as orphans. Kanna and the elite British soldiers then decide to go after Enomoto. Meanwhile, Enomoto, Sotetsu and Hijikata go to a secret dungeon under the base, where Sotetsu tells Hijikata that Enomoto has been possessed by the Head of the Conqueror, which will guarantee victory for Goryōkaku. One by one, the elite British soldiers attack Hijikata and Sotetsu, but Queen retreats and both Bishop and Knight are killed. When Kanna shoots his gun at Enomoto, the bullet ricochets to the wall. Queen attempts to use her crossbow, but Enomoto is able to quickly dodge before the arrows reach him. As Queen runs away in fear, Enomoto approaches Kanna, reminding him how his mother abandoned him. Enomoto then tells Kanna to fire a bullet at Queen, who then dies. Kanna cries as the ground rises to the surface, where Kakunojo prevents Kanna from shooting himself in the head, and he kisses her foot in repentance.
24	"Irohanihoheto"; Transliteration: "Iro wa Nioedo" (Japanese: 色は匂へど)	March 23, 2007
At the Tamoto Photograph House, Hijikata requests Yojiro to entrust him with slaying the Head of the Conqueror. On April 9, second year of Meiji, the New Government Army lands at Otobe, splitting into three groups and claiming victory over Kikonai and Matsumae. However, on April 13, second year of Meiji, Hijikata leads an invincible charge at Futamataguchi against the last group. While the rest of the troupe are concerned with Kakunojo's views on rebuilding the republic, Keisuke Otori leads an uprising to kill all merchants making money off the republic. Enomoto's subordinates withdraw when Yojiro shows up to save a girl from being killed outside a burning building. After witnessing Otori's rebellion, Hijikata confronts the Head of the Conqueror within Enomoto, only to be told to leave by Sotetsu and Enomoto. Hijikata gives Tetsunosuke a letter to deliver to Katsu, then Tetsunosuke says farewell to Kakunojo before embarking on his journey. On May 11, second year of Meiji, a battle has begun between the New Government Army and the Yuguntai at Bentenai Pier. Enomoto and Kakunojo transform Goryōkaku into an iron wall fortress. At Ippongi Gate, Hijikata kills many New Government Army soldiers, but Kanna shoots Hijikata to death.
25	"Goryōkaku Emerges"; Transliteration: "Goryōkaku Fujousuru" (Japanese: 五稜郭浮上する)	March 30, 2007
After Hijikata's death, Yojiro challenges Kanna to a duel to the death to settle matters, sending them both off a cliff into the sea below. At night at the base, the sky rains red as Kakunojo gives hope for the crowd. Brunet leaves after realizing that Sotetsu is not planning a revolution anymore, seeing that the crowd is more like a mob. Kanna, who is barely living, sits on a chair next to the stage, while looking at a locket containing a picture of his mother. At a cemetery, Shiranui and Kotoha give a letter to Okoma to deliver to Katsu. As Otori has already taken measures, Okoma is attacked by one of Enomoto's subordinates at a pier, while Shiranui and Kotoha are ambushed by two of Enomoto's subordinates at a restaurant. While Okoma kills her opponent, Kotoha is gravely injured by hers, prompting Shiranui to slaughter them in anger. After the fortress of Shiryōkaku fell, the Yuguntai rallied together and collaborated with the New Government Army, as they closed in on Goryōkaku. However, the five old sorcerers cause destruction upon the land and sea surrounding Goryōkaku.
26	"To Go Towards the Sea"; Transliteration: "Umi no Mukau e" (Japanese: 海の向うへ)	April 6, 2007
The rest of the troupe are relieved that Kotoha will be fine after she gets some rest. Yojiro, who is still alive, enters Goryōkaku, where he faces Kakunojo in a fruitless struggle of a duel, while Sotetsu watches nearby. Meanwhile, Enomoto has an internal battle with the Head of the Conqueror, who wants the Eternal Assassin destroyed. As Kakunojo prepares to stab Yojiro with her sword, he grasp onto it and takes it away, finally undoing their curse and releasing the Head of the Conqueror from Enomoto. However, Sotetsu summons the Head of the Conqueror to be his new vessel. While the five old sorcerers continue wreaking havoc upon the earth, Yojiro fights Sotetsu. After Yojiro stabs Sotetsu, the Head of the Conqueror is released, allowing Yojiro the opportunity to finally seal it. Sotetsu dies after saying that Yojiro is as strong-willed as Ryoma. On May 18, second year of Meiji, Goryōkaku falls and the Boshin War ends. Two months later, Yojiro and Kakunojo leave their Moon Tear Swords inside Lord Shoten's shrine. The Yuyama Troupe resume performing, as Kakunojo says farewell to Yojiro, who is going away on business while thinking about Ryoma's vision of world exploration.
