= Five Numbers! =

Japanese original video animation (OVA) series

- DVD cover of Coicent and Five Numbers!, released by Sentai Filmworks

ノラゲキ！ (Norageki!)
- Genre: Science fiction
- Original video animation
- Directed by: Hiroaki Ando
- Written by: Dai Satō
- Music by: Yasutaka Nakata
- Studio: Sunrise
- Licensed by: AUS: Madman Entertainment; NA: Sentai Filmworks
- Released: April 7, 2011
- Runtime: 25 minutes

Five Numbers! (ノラゲキ！, Norageki!) is a 2011 Japanese anime original video animation release. The OVA was directed by Hiroaki Ando, written by Dai Satō and produced by Sunrise. It is licensed in North America by Sentai Filmworks, it was released alongside another Sunrise OVA, Coicent, on DVD and Blu-ray on November 22, 2011, on the same disc.

== Plot ==
In an isolated prison, there are only four prisoners and a cat. One day, a power outage opens all the locks and all the prisoners are released. However, all the guards are nowhere to be seen and there are no exits. An extraordinary event occurs in response to an old man's strange behavior.

== Characters ==
Young Man (好青年, Kouseinen)
Voiced by: Miyu Irino (Japanese); Greg Ayres (English)
His codename is Pokerface, also identified as N17.
Woman (いい女, Ii Onna)
Voiced by: Takako Honda (Japanese); Tiffany Grant (English)
Her codename is Sting, also identified as R21.
Middle Aged Man (中年男, Chuunen Otoko)
Voiced by: Kazuma Mori (Japanese); John Gremillion (English)
His codename is Pinch-Hitter, also identified as N35.
Girl (オタ女, Ota Onna)
Voiced by: Meg (Japanese); Hilary Haag (English)
Her codename is FlashTradeKiller, also identified as R12.
Old Man (老人, Roujin)
Voiced by: Seizō Katō (Japanese); George Manley (English)
His codename is Enplein, also identified as VO.
Coupier (ノラ猫, Nora Neko)
Voiced by: Mutsumi Tamura (Japanese); Tiffany Grant (English)
The Cat.
