= George Manley =

American actor

- Born: September 17, 1965 (age 60); Sacramento, California, U.S.
- Education: San Jose State University; University of Nevada, Reno
- Occupations: Voice actor, writer
- Years active: 2002–present
- Website: http://www.themanleyvoice.com

George Edmond Manley (born September 17, 1965) is an American voice actor, novelist, and screenwriter. He attended San Jose State University, majoring in theatre arts, University of Nevada, Reno, majoring in journalism and holds his associate of science degree in Computer Information Systems and trained at San Francisco's Voice One Studio and with Braintracks Audio's Nancy Wolfson in commercial and character voiceover. He performed voice work at ADV Films, including Francesco in the second volume of Noir; Impact, the giant robot in Legend of the Mystical Ninja; Hyugi Zeravire from Gravion Zwei; Barba from Hakugei: Legend of The Moby Dick; and the English-language narrator for Science Ninja Team Gatchaman. He wrote a script adaptation for six episodes of Gantz, and is the series writer for the adaptation of Super Dimension Fortress Macross, 009-1, Coyote Ragtime Show, Pumpkin Scissors and Full Metal Panic! The Second Raid. Manley became a voice actor after meeting and receiving encouragement at the 2002 FanimeCon from Amanda Winn-Lee, Tiffany Grant, and Matt Greenfield. Manley is an on-air personality for Houston's Taping for the Blind Radio (now known as Turning Sight into Sound Radio), reading the Houston Chronicle and Sports Illustrated on a weekly basis.

== Filmography ==
=== Anime ===
- 009-1 – Double Gomez, Apollo
- Area 88 – Charlie (OAV), Gustav Tanhelm (TV series)
- Akame ga Kill! – Ogre
- Aura Battler Dunbine – Captain Kawasse, Lord Shotan, Puradon, Kotaro
- Blue Drop – Hasegawa (Mari's Driver)
- Bodacious Space Pirates – Schnitzer
- The Book of Bantorra – Ruweek Hartain, Boramotte, Karune
- Canaan – U.S. President
- Children Who Chase Lost Voices – Commander of Arned Priest
- Chrono Crusade – Viede, Gotti
- Coicent – Blue Brother
- Comic Party Revolution – The Chief, Nagase Chou
- Coyote Ragtime Show – Admiral Malcolm Floyd
- Cromartie High School – Masked Takenouchi
- Devil Survivor 2: The Animation – Byakko
- Dirty Pair: Affair of Nolandia – Yullgis
- Divergence Eve – Doctor Kessler
- Five Numbers! – VO (Old Man/Enplein)
- Fullmetal Alchemist: Brotherhood – Darius
- Full Metal Panic! The Second Raid – Gate's Subordinate
- Gantz – Haruya
- Ghost Stories – Asai, Muffled Doctor
- Gintama: The Movie – Henpeita Takeuchi
- Godannar – Moukaku
- Gravion Zwei – Hyugi Zeravire
- Hakugei: Legend of The Moby Dick – Barba
- Hakkenden: Eight Dogs of the East – Toad Spirit
- Hakuōki – Kai Shimada
- Halo Legends – Berger (The Babysitter)
- Horizon in the Middle of Nowhere – Tadatsugu Sakai
- Intrigue in the Bakumatsu - Irohanihoheto – Genba Hario
- Kaleido Star – Marine Park Owner, Herron
- Kurau Phantom Memory – Frank Zaksman
- Legends of the Dark King – Jadaum
- Legend of the Mystical Ninja – Impact
- Log Horizon – Isaac
- Maburaho – Principal Mori
- Madlax – Lieutenant "Pops" Nyman
- Majestic Prince – Dolgana
- Majikoi! – Oh! Samurai Girls – Cookie (Form II & V)
- Maria Holic – Narrator
- Megazone 23 – Guts, Computer Tech, Alphonse
- Michel – Sitel
- Neon Genesis Evangelion – Man in Suit
- Nerima Daikon Brothers – Buff Pandaikon
- Night Raid 1931 – Director, Kanji Ishihara
- Noir – Francesco, Boss Bertonie
- One Piece (Funimation dub) – Hatchan, Montblanc Cricket
- Papuwa – Isami Kondo
- Parasyte - Hirama
- Problem Children Are Coming from Another World, Aren't They? - Deen, Water God
- Project Blue Earth SOS – Commander Horner
- Pumpkin Scissors – Lance Corporal Mercury, Old Man (episode 6)
- RahXephon – Ulysses Captain, Captain Nomad
- Saint Seiya – Dante (ADV Dub)
- Samurai Gun – Lord Kozan
- Science Ninja Team Gatchaman (ADV dub) – Narrator
- Shining Hearts: Shiawase no Pan – Hank
- Short Peace – Gimlet (A Farewell to Weapons)
- Tears to Tiara – Ladu, Bublux
- The Super Dimension Fortress Macross – Lynn Shaochin
- Those Who Hunt Elves – Villager, Mary the Shepherd, Santa Claus, Sorcerer, Tree Demon
- Xam'd: Lost Memories – Senten Island Commandant
- Yugo the Negotiator – Senior Lieutenant Viktor

=== Live-Action ===
- Meet My Folks – Mailman (episodes 1 and 3)
- Room – Jim
- The Brain Storm – BLT

=== Video games ===
- Kohan II: Kings of War – Jonas Teramun/Sijansur, Xander Kharei, King Agborus, Ord
- Axis & Allies RTS – General George Patton, Field Marshal Konstantin Rokossovski, Field Marshal Bernard Law Montgomery, Vice Admiral Gunichi Mikawa, American Commander, Tutorial Narrator

== Production staff ==
=== ADR Script Adaptation ===
- 009-1
- The Ambition of Nobuna Oda
- Amnesia
- Black Bullet
- Bryhildr: in The Darkness
- Coyote Ragtime Show
- Devil Survivor 2: The Animation
- Dog & Scissors
- Dramatical Murder
- Full Metal Panic! The Second Raid
- Gantz
- Gatchaman Crowds -insight-
- Hakkenden: Eight Dogs of the East (season 1 and 2)
- Hakuoki: The Boisterous Dance of Kyoto
- Hakuoki: The Blue Sky of a Samurai's Spirit
- Hamatora - Season 2
- Hanayamata
- Log Horizon
- Log Horizon 2
- Magical Warfare
- Majestic Prince
- MM!
- Pumpkin Scissors
- Rozen Maiden: Zurückspulen
- Samurai Bride
- Say "I Love You".
- The Super Dimension Fortress Macross
- The World God Only Knows: Goddess Arc
- When Supernatural Battles Became Commonplace
- Upotte!!

=== Spotting ===
- Girls und Panzer der Film
- My Love Story
- Utawarerumono: The False Faces
