= Kurau Phantom Memory =

Japanese anime television series

- Funimation DVD cover.
- Genre: Science fiction, Drama, post-cyberpunk
- Created by: Bones
- Anime television series
- Directed by: Yasuhiro Irie
- Produced by: Maki Horiuchi; Masahiko Minami; Schreck Hedwick; Shirō Sasaki; Toshihiko Nakajima
- Written by: Aya Yoshinaga
- Music by: Yukari Katsuki
- Studio: Bones
- Licensed by: NA: Funimation Entertainment
- Original network: Animax, TV Asahi
- English network: UK: Propeller TV; US: Anime Network
- Original run: June 24, 2004 – December 15, 2004
- Episodes: 24
- Light novel
- Written by: Hiroshi Tominaga
- Illustrated by: Tomomi Ozaki toi8
- Published by: Media Factory
- Imprint: MF Bunko J
- Original run: August 25, 2004 – February 25, 2005
- Volumes: 2
- Manga
- Illustrated by: Itsuki Hoshi
- Published by: Kodansha
- Magazine: Magazine Z
- Original run: 2004 – 2005
- Volumes: 1

Kurau Phantom Memory (stylized as KURAU Phantom Memory) is a Japanese science fiction anime series, produced by Bones and Media Factory, which was broadcast in Japan by the anime television networks Animax and TV Asahi from June to December 2004. Set primarily in the year 2110, it explores themes such as inter-familial relationships and ethics in science. The series was licensed by A.D. Vision for North American localization for $960,000 since the first episode aired, and the first DVD was released on April 10, 2007. In 2008, the series was transferred from A.D. Vision to Funimation Entertainment, along with over 30 other titles.

== Plot ==
In the year 2100, Dr. Amami is a scientist working in the field of alternative energy, who at the beginning of the series is on the verge of a major breakthrough in the area of "Rynax energy". His daughter Kurau accompanies him to the lab on her twelfth birthday, where an experiment goes horribly wrong and she is struck by a bolt of this energy, which disperses her into lights.

When she reforms, it is found that her body has been taken over by two Rynax, who are actually sentient life forms and not just a form of energy. However, one of the Rynax is too weak to awaken. The awakened Rynax takes on Kurau's name and identity, and though her newfound superhuman abilities make her a subject of interest for scientists, Kurau manages to live a relatively normal life. Ten years later, the second Rynax awakens and emerges as a twelve-year-old girl, whom Kurau names Christmas. The two look and interact very much like sisters.

=== Rynax ===
Originally believed to be a form of energy, Rynax are actually binary life forms that exist in Pairs. These beings are made up of pure energy and are channeled from an alternate dimension, and not generated as Dr. Amami believed. This channeling proves very traumatic for the Rynax, and often results in nearly immediate death. A Rynax that has fused with a human is known as a Ryna sapien. However, fusing with a human is often dangerous, and the usual outcome is a slow, agonizing death for both human and Rynax. Kurau proves to be extremely fortunate, as the human and Rynax components of her identity live together in a symbiotic relationship. The Rynax also give her special abilities, such as amazing strength and agility, and the ability to fly, pass through solid objects and generate enough radiation to disintegrate objects instantly.

Other humans who have been merged with Rynax prove to be dangerous and destructive people, resulting in pursuit of the GPO (police force) and termination of both Rynax and human. Kurau and her Pair are pursued by the GPO under the belief that they, too, are a threat to the world. Kurau vows to protect her Pair, while at the same time trying to escape detection and live a peaceful life.

== Characters ==
Kurau Amami – Voiced by: Ayako Kawasumi (Japanese); Monica Rial (English)
A mysterious young woman employed as an "Agent": A freelance operative who takes any job that is potentially too dangerous or illegal to involve normal private eyes or the Global Police Organization (GPO). Although barely in her twenties, Kurau is already one of the best in the business, and the rumor is that there is no job she won't take and nothing she can't do. Few people know her well, however, and her past is a complete mystery. In truth, the Kurau the world sees is actually the result of a freak accident that occurred ten years earlier, in which her body became fused with an energy-being called a Rynax. In the process, their two personalities merged/interwove together into a new composite creature that shares two different pasts. As a result, Kurau has incredible abilities of strength, flight, even on occasion up to full dissipation and/or reforming of her body, but also is somewhat of a loner, not quite comfortable with human society and forced to shun close relationships with other humans, lest they discover her secret. At the same time, she longs to be reunited with her Rynax Pair, whose essence sleeps inside her.
Christmas – Voiced by: Misa Kobayashi (Japanese); Jessica Boone (English)
Kurau's Rynax Pair. She emerges from Kurau's body ten years after the incident which fused her with the Rynax. Christmas is similar in appearance to Kurau at age twelve, albeit decidedly less tomboyish. Unlike Kurau, Christmas initially has no superhuman abilities. Although seemingly innocent and naive, she seems to have an intuitive understanding of others as well as an ability to learn very quickly. For example, she is able to read a cookbook and produce a full dinner on her first day out in the world.
Hajime Amami – Voiced by: Mitsuru Ogata (Japanese); John Gremillion (English)
Kurau's father, a kind, intelligent man and former alternative energy researcher. Wracked by guilt over the accident that changed Kurau, and physically damaged after his own encounter with Rynax force, he is now being forced by the GPO to work on a project that could destroy his own child.
Doug – Voiced by: Tomoyuki Shimura (Japanese); Jason Douglas (English)
A down and out Agent and former officer in the GPO, Doug finds himself trapped in a steadily deteriorating situation when he is assigned to find out the truth about Kurau. Trusting neither the police nor his own shady employers, Doug soon finds himself empathizing with Kurau as she goes on the run.
Wong Shun Yee – Voiced by: Tōru Furusawa (Japanese); Illich Guardiola (English)
A determined but enigmatic investigator who commands a GPO unit tasked with investigating and controlling Ryna sapiens. Soft-spoken and a man of few but precisely-chosen words, Wong seems to know more about what is really going on than his own superiors. He also has suspicions that he is not being told the complete truth about the Rynax situation.
Ayaka Steiger – Voiced by: Yuko Kaida (Japanese); Tiffany Grant (English)
Formerly Doug's subordinate/partner in the GPO, Ayaka is now assigned as a captain in Wong's unit, and is directly in charge of capturing Kurau. She seems to be focused on advancing in rank by any means possible, but in fact her own father was the head of the GPO until he was assassinated. For this reason, Ayaka prefers to be called only by her first name, and one of her real goals is to find out the reasons behind her father's death. She trusts no one with this secret, although she still keeps track of her former partner Doug, and she and Wong appear to develop a relationship based on mutual respect.
Ichise – Voiced by: Nobuo Tobita (Japanese); John Swasey (English)
Although an older scientist than Amami, Ichise began as a subordinate in Amami's lab, but quickly worked his way up to a position in charge by sucking up to the GPO and betraying his former colleagues. A ruthless man, he cares about nothing but advancing his own agenda, no matter what the cost to others might be.
Saito – Voiced by: Minoru Inaba (Japanese); Rick Peeples (English)
Saito is the commissioner of the GPO and the series' main antagonist. Saito is intent on building a military unit out of Rynax soldiers.
Minamida – Voiced by: Fumihiko Tachiki (Japanese); Marty Fleck (English)
A crusty and grizzled old veteran who runs the Agency that Kurau normally works for. He is a tough-talking man who harbors a secret fondness for Kurau, but that won't stop him from sending her on the most dangerous assignments.
Ella – Voiced by: Miyuki Ichijo (Japanese); Melinda DeKay (English)
The Amami family housekeeper, Ella is a kindly older woman who took care of the young Kurau after the death of her mother. World-wise and a keen observer of human nature, Ella understands the relationship between Dr. Amami and his daughter far better than they do themselves.
Ted – Voiced by: Makoto Tsumura/Mamoru Miyano (Japanese); Kira Vincent-Davis (English)
Doug's son, who is being raised by his mother and has become rather spoiled and aloof. He is also growing increasingly disenchanted with his father, who quit his "cool" job in the GPO to become a "boring" low-end private eye.
Frank Zaksman – Voiced by: Akio Nojima (Japanese); George Manley (English)
Frank is Kurau's uncle, who lives with his wife Kleine in Switzerland.
Kleine Zaksman – Voiced by: Sumi Shimamoto (Japanese); Shelley Calene-Black (English)
Kleine is Kurau's aunt, who lives with her husband Frank in Switzerland.
Yvon Tardieu – Voiced by: Miyu Irino (Japanese); Shannon Emerick (English)
Jessica Lundgren – Voiced by: Hiroko Kasahara (Japanese); Larissa Wolcott (English)
Windt Delyus – Voiced by: Yōji Matsuda (Japanese); Greg Ayres (English)
Regel Delyus – Voiced by: Mitsunori Isaki (Japanese); Vic Mignogna (English)

== Theme songs ==
- Opening theme: "Natsukashii Umi" by Akino Arai
- Ending theme: "Moonlight" by Yukari Katsuki (S.E.N.S.)
- Insert songs: "Lilipri Layli" and "Lonely Freedom" by Yukari Katsuki (S.E.N.S.)

== Reception ==
Kurau Phantom Memory received mixed but generally positive reviews from critics. Kevin Gifford of Newtype USA praised the first volume of the series for its "neat take on the Ghost in the Shell-ish 'super-powered ladies in a dystopian future' formula" and said that it had "one of the most memorable first episodes" of any recent anime. Mania.com reviewer Brian Morton said that early on the series was "something of a disappointment," but that later episodes were "engaging, entertaining, and in some ways thought-provoking." He gave the series a B+ rating and called it "well worth watching." Diane Tiu of T.H.E.M. Anime Reviews gave the series five out of five stars, stating that "there is very little to dislike about this series. There are no filler episodes and story moves at a crack pace". She also compared Kurau's movement style to that of Juna Ariyoshi from the anime series Arjuna.

In his review of the final DVD, Theron Martin of Anime News Network praised Kurau for its characters and "emotional appeal," but criticized how it was marketed, saying that too much focus was put on its action elements. In the site's Best of 2007 feature, both reviewers listed the series among the best of the year, describing it as "a combination of understated but convincing world-building, action, and genuine emotion (along with a pair of memorable and adorable leads)". Martin also named Kurau and Christmas "Best Couple," saying that while they are not "a couple in the traditional romantic sense," they "have such a close and loving connection that they put even Keiichi and Belldandy to shame."

Some reviewers were more critical of the series. IGN reviewer Jeffrey Harris gave the first DVD of the series a 6 out of 10 ("Passable") rating, stating that "Kurau starts more on the slow side, but it looks like it could be picking up steam and getting more exciting ... The show needs to be less vague about the Rynax and their origins." Norman Rafferty of The Escapist gave the series a mostly negative review, criticizing it for lack of originality and saying that "After a promising opening, Kurau Phantom Memory quickly becomes melodrama." Otaku USA reviewer C.M. Brendelson said the series failed to make an emotional impact, and that the "story and character flaws, which are numerous and thoroughly aggravating, destroy what is otherwise a beautifully produced show."
