= Coicent =

2011 original video animation

- DVD Cover of Coicent and Five Numbers! released by Sentai Filmworks.

コイ☆セント (Koi☆Sento)
- Genre: Romantic comedy, Science fiction
- Original video animation
- Directed by: Shuhei Morita
- Written by: Shuhei Morita
- Studio: Sunrise
- Licensed by: AUS: Madman Entertainment; NA: Sentai Filmworks
- Released: February 25, 2011
- Runtime: 26 minutes

Coicent (コイ☆セント, Koi☆Sento) is a 2000 (copyright date) Japanese CG anime original video animation release. The OVA was written and directed by Shuhei Morita and produced by Sunrise. This story takes place in 2710, when a boy named Shinichi follows a white deer and meets a strange girl. It is licensed in North America by Sentai Filmworks, and was released alongside another Sunrise produced OVA Five Numbers! on DVD and Blu-ray on November 22, 2011.

== Plot ==
In 2710, a boy named Shinichi is on a school field trip to a rebuilt 21st century version of the city Nara. When he wanders from his class, he spots a talking white deer and it steals his bag. Shinichi follows the deer and sees a strange girl named Toto and falls in love with her. She is being pursued by two brothers and they try to get away from them.

== Characters ==
Shinichi (シンイチ)
Voiced by: Kensho Ono (Japanese); Vic Mignogna (English)
A boy who sees the White Deer and meets Toto.
Toto (トト)
Voiced by: Minako Kotobuki (Japanese); Luci Christian (English)
A mysterious girl who is seen riding the White Deer. She is being chased by the two brothers.
White Deer (白いシカ, Shiroi Shika)
Voiced by: Kappei Yamaguchi (Japanese); Matt Greenfield (English)
A strange talking deer who is white in color. He leads Shinichi to Toto.
Madame President (シャチョウ, Sachou)
Voiced by: Masako Isobe (Japanese); John Gremillion (English)
The president of a large company, she hires the brothers to capture Toto.
Older Brother (アニキ, Aniki), Voiced by: Tetsu Inada (Japanese); George Manley (English)
Younger Brother (オトウト, Otouto), Voiced by: Takehito Koyasu (Japanese); Mark X. Laskowski (English)
Two brothers who were hired to capture Toto. The older brother wears a blue suit and the younger brother wears a yellow suit.
