= Rob Mungle =

American voice actor

- Born: Robert Mungle
- Other names: Robert L. Mungle; Rob Mumgle; Mungle Roberts, The Reverend
- Occupation: Voice actor
- Years active: 1994–present

Robert Mungle is an American voice actor and stand-up comedian, having been known as The Reverend.

== Filmography ==
=== Anime ===
- 009-1 - Odin
- Akame ga Kill! - Headhunter Zanku, Trauma (Ep. 11)
- Angel Beats! - Matsushita the 5th
- Aquarian Age: Sign for Evolution - Naoyuki Kamikurata
- Area 88 - Greg Gates
- Blue Drop - Gen (Mari's Gardener)
- Blue Seed - Daitetsu Kunikida
- The Book of Bantorra - Vizak, Wyzaf
- Broken Blade - General Baldr
- Bubblegum Crisis Tokyo 2040 - Nick Roland
- Canaan - Jin
- Clannad - Gentleman, Oogami
- Cromartie High School - Pootan's Buddy
- Demon King Daimao - Academy Director, Yatagasru (Crow)
- Devil May Cry: The Animated Series - J.D. Morrison
- Devil Survivor 2: The Animation - Berzerker
- Dream Eater Merry - Griccho
- E's Otherwise - Naozumi
- Excel Saga - Pedro
- Fullmetal Alchemist: Brotherhood - Henry Douglas
- Gantz - Hatanaka
- Ghost Hound - Seiichi Suzuki
- Ghost Stories - Amanojaku
- Godannar - Shibakusa
- Golgo 13 - Regan
- The Guin Saga - Archduke Vlad
- Gunsmith Cats - Bill Collins
- Guy: Double Target - Guy
- Guyver: The Bioboosted Armor - Somlum
- Halo Legends - Dutch (The Babysitter), Additional Voices
- Heaven's Memo Pad - Nemo
- Hiiro no Kakera - Drei
- Intrigue in the Bakumatsu - Irohanihoheto - Gensai Hachisuka (Ep. 5–6), Takamori Saigo
- Inu x Boku SS - Joe
- I Parry Everything - Master
- Kamisama Dolls - Yasuyuki Kuga
- Kekko Kamen - Big Toenail of Satan
- Kenichi: The Mightiest Disciple - Sogetsu Ma
- Kiba - Dumas, Hyrum
- La storia della Arcana Famiglia - Mondo
- Le Chevalier D'Eon - Caron de Beaumarchais
- Legends of the Dark King: A Fist of the North Star Story - Uighur
- Log Horizon - Demiquas
- Maburaho - Mr. Miura
- Magikano - Cait Sith
- Majestic Prince - Hideyuki
- Majikoi! - Oh! Samurai Girls - Bandages, Memu
- Mardock Scramble: The First Compression - Flesh the Pike
- Martian Successor Nadesico - Goat Hory
- Moeyo Ken - Kan Kan
- Moonlight Mile - Alan, President Jim McDowell
- Needless - Momiji Teruyama
- Noir - Foster
- One Piece - Igarappoi "Igaram", Tom (Funimation dub)
- Pani Poni Dash! - The Alien Subordinates
- Papuwa - Rod
- Parasyte - Kazuyuki Izumi
- Peacemaker Kurogane - Hajime Saitou
- Princess Resurrection - Poseidon
- Red Garden - Raúl Girardot
- Saint Seiya - Bear Geki, Cancer DeathMask, Additional voices
- Shirobako - Tatsuya Ochiai
- Sorcerer Hunters OVA - Narrator
- Space Pirate Captain Harlock - Yulian
- Spice and Wolf II - Eligin
- Super Milk Chan - The Landlord, Himself (Live-Action Footage)
- Street Fighter II V - Guile (ADV Dub)
- Tactics - Wantanbe
- Tears to Tiara - Delator
- Tokyo Majin - Big Mama, Yoriki Taisen
- The Ambition of Oda Nobuna - Sakuma Nobumori, Shoukakuin Gousei
- The Wallflower - Sunako's Dad
- Un-Go - Komamori Sasa (Ep. 4), Masahiko Kanda (Ep. 1)
- Utawarerumono - Emuro
- Vinland Saga - Ragnar
- Xam'd Lost Memories - Ahm
- Yugo the Negotiator - Rashid

=== Video games ===
- Unlimited Saga - Basil Galeos, Edel
