= Pumpkin Scissors =

Japanese manga series

- First tankōbon volume cover
- Genre: Action; Alternate history; Military
- Manga
- Written by: Ryotaro Iwanaga
- Published by: Kodansha
- English publisher: NA: Del Rey Manga (former); Kodansha USA (current; digital)
- Magazine: Magazine Great (2002–2006); Monthly Shōnen Magazine (2006–present)
- Original run: July 2002 – present
- Volumes: 25
- Manga

Pumpkin Scissors: Power Snips
- Written by: Ryotaro Iwanaga
- Illustrated by: Nobu Ootsuki
- Published by: Kodansha
- Magazine: Monthly Shōnen Magazine+
- Original run: October 20, 2011 – present
- Volumes: 2
- Anime television series
- Directed by: Katsuhito Akiyama
- Written by: Atsuhiro Tomioka
- Music by: Kow Otani
- Studio: Gonzo; AIC
- Licensed by: Crunchyroll (Note: In North America through Crunchyroll, LLC (formerly known as Funimation).); UK: ADV Films (former); MVM Films (current)
- Original network: TVS, tvk, MTV, KBS, SUN, Tokyo MX, CTC
- English network: SEA: Animax Asia
- Original run: October 2, 2006 – March 19, 2007
- Episodes: 24
- icon

Pumpkin Scissors is a Japanese manga series written and illustrated by Ryotaro Iwanaga. The series follows Second Lieutenant Alice L. Malvin, the leader of the Pumpkin Scissors, as she and her platoon go on missions to provide war relief to the public after the Royal Empire signed an armistice against the Republic of Frost.

The series started in Kodansha's shōnen manga magazine Magazine Great in 2002 and moved to Monthly Shōnen Magazine in 2006. Its chapters have been collected in 26 tankōbon volumes as of November 2026. In North America, the manga was published for English release by Del Rey, publishing five volumes before ceasing operations in 2010. It was later licensed by Kodansha USA for a digital release.

A 24-episode television series adaptation, produced by Gonzo and AIC, was broadcast from October 2006 to March 2007. It was first licensed in North America by ADV Films, and later transferred to Funimation.

== Plot ==
Set in a region that strongly resembles Western Europe, the setting is mid-1930s technology at best. Tanks exist, but semi-automatic rifles have just been developed, and the main means of transportation is still by train or car. Planes are seldom used, and wireless communication does not exist, resulting in a dieselpunk setting. After a catastrophic war similar to the Great War, which lasted 11 years in this universe and occurred in the early 20th century, the Royal Empire (culturally similar to the German Empire but with traditions dating back to the Middle Ages) and the Republic of Frost declared a ceasefire. The Empire is plagued by starvation, and pestilence, with former soldiers turning to thievery, banditry and other forms of crime, forming into gangs to survive the post-war period. Three years later, to aid the people of the Empire in the war relief effort, the Imperial Army State Section III, also known as the Pumpkin Scissors unit, is established.

The name for the group was an idea from one of its officers, the Second Lieutenant Alice L. Malvin. According to her, in their war relief effort, they must "face the threat of corrupt people who protect themselves behind lies, power, and money like the rind of a pumpkin", and Section III must act like a pair of scissors cutting through those layers and delivering justice for the people. This is a constant message which ripples throughout the series. The unit is, however, berated constantly, considered a propaganda tool used by the government, and is seen as an insult to the war relief effort by many within the army, as well as the Empire's citizens. Randel Oland, a veteran soldier with a mysterious past, joins their ranks and steadily the Pumpkin Scissors unit begins to be taken more seriously as the plot begins to unravel.

== Characters ==
Second Lieutenant Alice L. Malvin (アリス・L・マルヴィン, Arisu Rei Maruvin)
Voiced by: Shizuka Itou (Japanese); Kaytha Coker (English)
Second-in-command and platoon leader of State Section III, aka Pumpkin Scissors. An inexperienced soldier of noble origin who graduated in the academy just before the ceasefire (the ceasefire was announced literally in the middle of the graduation ceremony for the class of officers she was in at military academy); Alice's hot-tempered and reckless demeanor tends to sometimes put her and her subordinates in danger. She has a strong sense of duty and justice and tries to live up to her family's military traditions, contrary to her father and sisters' belief that she must assume a more feminine behavior. While she is the current heir to her family, she will likely lose this position once her younger brother comes of age.
Contrary to her subordinates who always engage in combat with firearms, Alice's weapon of choice is a short-sword with her family crest engraved on it, but in some occasions she shows her true skills in battle when brandishing her special weapon, a long double-bladed cavalry sword called Mahne. Another curious trait of hers is that sometimes she feels chills on her neck when something very good or very bad is about to happen. Alice is engaged to another noble, Lionel Taylor, who apparently supports her ideals.
Corporal Randel Oland (ランデル・オーランド, Randeru Ōrando)
Voiced by: Kenta Miyake (Japanese); Adam Dudley (English)
A retired soldier who joined Pumpkin Scissors to aid in their war relief effort. He was a former member of the 901st Anti-Tank Troopers (901-ATT), which basically consisted of foot soldiers trained to take down enemy tanks by themselves. This unit, known also as the "Gespenster Jäger" (German for "Ghost Hunter") was part of the Invisible 9, a secret and illegal unit created by the Empire for the war. They are specially trained to ignore pain and fear in order to engage tanks and armored vehicles at point blank range. While the division was secret, all tank crews were warned to be wary of soldiers carrying a blue lantern.
Despite his impressive stature (probably over seven feet), and a body riddled with scars, Randel's nature most of the time is kindhearted and ingenuous. But when he is in trouble he turns on his blue-steel lantern marked "901-ATT", and he becomes a fearless and vicious combatant. He is capable of defeating even heavily armored foes with his 13 mm anti-tank pistol, known as the "Door Knocker" (highly reminiscent of a Thompson/Center Contender pistol), and is later shown to use another weapon, which is a giant pair of shears—flashbacks showed it to be used to rip apart the metal plating armor of tanks to get to the pilot crews.
Due to his reckless style of combat brought on from his conditioning/training to ignore pain and fear, Randel is frequently hospitalized during the series. These hospital stays lead to a running gag about the size of the corporal's penis, and the inability of the hospital nurse to find a urine container that will not break.
Captain Hunks (ハンクス, Hankusu)
Voiced by: Chou (Japanese); Marty Fleck (English)
The commanding officer and administrator of Pumpkin Scissors. He issues mission orders and provides a calm, steadying presence, which balances Lieutenant Malvin's impetuous nature. His personality is relaxed and informal.
Warrant Officer Oreldo (オレルド, Orerudo)
Voiced by: Kousuke Toriumi (Japanese); Gray Haddock (English)
Childhood friend of Martis, Oreldo is a handsome young soldier who fancies himself a ladies' man, yet seems to be something of a player. He is very clever, resourceful and an expert at picking locks. His background has yet to be fully explained, but he seemed to be a street urchin before joining the military.
Warrant Officer Martis (マーチス, Māchisu)
Voiced by: Chihiro Suzuki (Japanese); Blake Shepard (English)
Graduated as one of the top students of the academy, the slight, bespectacled Martis provides the voice of reason and caution when out in the field. It is also hinted from one of the episodes that he knows very good defensive-based martial arts.
Sergeant Major Lili Stecchin (リリ・ステッキン, Riri Sutekkin)
Voiced by: Kana Ueda (Japanese); Monica Passley (English)
She is the longest serving member of the "Pumpkin Scissors" unit. Little is known about her past except that she was a part of the military band in her previous post. She serves as Captain Hunks' aide and is also responsible for taking care of Mercury. She is elated to no end that with the recruitment of Randel into their unit, she finally outranks someone (other than the messenger-dog, Mercury) and has "an underling!" It is also noted in the anime filler episode that she loves children and wants to be a good mother one day.
Private First Class Mercury (マーキュリー号, Mākyurī-gō)
Voiced by: Kazuki Ogawa (Japanese); Smokey DeLange (episodes 1-4), George Manley (episodes 7-24) (English)
Often referred to as "Merc" (マーくん, Mā-kun; "Mer-kun"). The platoon's messenger-dog, who has a bad habit of biting peoples' heads. He was demoted from Corporal to Courier Private First Class for biting an officer in Episode 1. He is very fast, reliable and sensitive to the emotions of his team. Their reaction to a particularly unpleasant officer (Major Connery) lead to the previously mentioned incident. He resembles a Labrador Retriever.
While Merc is normally seen as a friendly dog with the members of State Section III, when events warrant it, he shows himself to be what the commoners referred to as a "military hound," and can even disarm opponents.
First Lieutenant Webner (ウェブナー, Webunā)
Voiced by: Akiko Hiramatsu (Japanese); Laurie Gallardo (English)
The officer in charge of the technology development unit of the Imperial Army Intelligence Center Office.
Lionel Taylor (レオニール・テイラー, Reonīru Teirā)
Voiced by: Shinichiro Miki (Japanese); Brian Jepson (English)
The noble fiancé of Alice. A tall and smooth talking gentleman who is well aware of the corruption and madness that is running through the nobles, as well as Alice's love for the military. He has been known to give State Section III tips on matters, though he seems to have more sinister purposes up his sleeve.
Major Connery (コネリー, Konerī)
Voiced by: Tomoyuki Shimura (Japanese); John Tyson (English)
The commanding officer for State Section I of the Imperial Army Intelligence Center Office. Compared to Captain Hunks, his personality is cold-hearted. However, along with Captain Hunks, he also seems to know about the secrets kept within the army. He often complains to Captain Hunks about State Section III interfering with his operations, but usually backs down eventually.
Wolmarf (ヴォルマルフ, Vorumarufu)
Voiced by: Dai Matsumoto (Japanese); Bill Wise (English)
The first minor antagonist of the series. He was a leader of the 903rd Chemical Tactics Troop (903-CTT), also known as "Krankheit Jäger" (German for "Disease Hunter"), which specialized in chemical warfare and part of the Invisible 9. Oland killed him with his "Door Knocker". As a bandit, he called himself "Grauwolfe" (German for "Grey Wolf") after his unit's code name. It is actually revealed in the manga that the main reason he turned rogue was because, after his captain was killed, he found out that their unit (at the end of the war, thus no longer needed), was considered to be composed of war criminals by the military, since in international treaties already forbade the use of chemical weapons before the war, thus taking all the blame of the military with them.
Hans (ハンス, Hansu)
Voiced by: Junji Majima (Japanese); Vic Mignogna (English)
A member of the 908th High-Temperature Troop (908-HTT), also known as "Alt Schmied Jäger" (German for "Old Smith Hunter" or "One-eyed Cremator", part of the Invisible 9. He is indebted to the secret organization "Silver Wheel". He and his unit members were given a flame thrower and a protective suit. The suit however did not protect against the flames, a fact the Kauplan Institute covered up by filling the suits with a fluid impregnated with analgesics, which kept the men from feeling the harm they did to their body and also prevent the skin to take damage from being in an enclosed environment for weeks, months or even years. After the ceasefire, Hans's fellow soldiers, ignorant of their life-threatening burns, took off their suits and perished. Hans was lost in thought and thus delayed in removing his own. His dying team members told him to keep that suit on, because if he too removed it he would die just like them. Hans spent the years since the ceasefire inside it.

== Media ==
=== Manga ===
Written and illustrated by Ryotaro Iwanaga, Pumpkin Scissors started in Kodansha's shōnen manga magazine Magazine Great in the July 2002 issue. Its last chapter in the magazine was published in the September 2006 issue, and the series later moved to Monthly Shōnen Magazine, starting in the November 2006 issue. Kodansha has collected its chapters into individual tankōbon volumes, with the first one released on June 16, 2004. As of November 6, 2026, 25 volumes have been released. The series entered on hiatus on March 6, 2020, and resumed on April 6, 2024.

In North America, the manga was licensed by Del Rey. The publisher released five volumes from November 27, 2007, to July 25, 2009, before ceasing operations in 2010. Kodansha USA started publishing the manga digitally on August 2, 2016; the 24th volume was published on March 18, 2025.

=== Anime ===
A 24-episode anime television series adaptation, animated by Gonzo and AIC, was broadcast on Teletama and other networks from October 3, 2006, to March 18, 2007. (Note: Teletama listed the air dates for the series on Monday at 26:00, which is effectively Saturday at 2:00 a.m. JST.)

In North America, the series was first licensed by ADV Films. The company released five DVD volumes (first 20 episodes) from October 23, 2007, to July 22, 2008. The title was then acquired by Funimation, who released the sixth and last volume (episodes 21–24) on February 10, 2009, and released a complete DVD set on August 25 of the same year. In Southeast Asia, the series was broadcast on Animax Asia.

== Reception ==
The English edition of the first volume of Pumpkin Scissors was named by the Young Adult Library Services Association as among the best graphic novels for teens for 2007.

The anime adaptation has received a mixed response from Anime News Network and The Escapist. Most of the criticism is directed at the lack of focus the series has for its story arcs and an ending that leaves the series incomplete. Theron Martin from Anime News Network did give some praise when going over the remaining four episodes of the anime, pointing out individual character moments, particularly Alice's duel, but criticized the series overall for dragging out the plot. The Escapist concluded their review by stating that "Had Pumpkin Scissors focused on fully developing at least one aspect of the story, it might have been a good series. As it stands, it feels unfinished with only a few interesting bits to spare from being totally forgettable."

== See also ==
- Armor Hunter Mellowlink, another anime series about an infantry anti-armor unit
