= Illich Guardiola =

Honduran voice actor

- Born: Illich Auyapah Guardiola; July 5, 1972 (age 54)
- Citizenship: Honduras; United States
- Occupation: Voice actor
- Years active: 1995–2014
- Spouses: Kaytha Coker (m. 1996; div. 2003) Undisclosed second wife (m. 2014)

Illich Auyapah Guardiola (born July 5, 1972) is a Honduran-born American former voice actor who provided voice roles for Japanese anime. Some of his major anime roles include Gin in One Piece, Kanba Takakura in Mawaru Penguindrum, Arawn in Tears to Tiara, Nimii in From the New World, Suguru Omi in the Hiro no Kakera series, and Yusuke Yoshino from the Clannad series.

== Personal life and legal issues ==
In April 2014, Guardiola was pulled over by Spring Branch Police and was found to have one of his 16-year-old students with him, who told investigators they were in a sexual relationship. Later that month, Guardiola and the teen traveled to Las Vegas and were married in the presence of the teen's mother. Guardiola was subsequently arrested on May 8, 2014, and charged with sexual assault of a child. On September 5, 2014, the charges were dismissed, since both the teen in question and her parents insisted that the relationship was consensual, refusing to press charges or to cooperate with police investigators.

Guardiola was in a previous relationship with Monica Rial in the 1990s.

== Filmography ==
=== Anime ===
List of dubbing performances in anime
Year	Title	Role	Notes	Source
1998	Those Who Hunt Elves	Chairman		
2000	Gensomaden Saiyuki	Sha Gojyo		
2003	Saint Seiya	Pegasus Seiya	ADV dub	
2010	Legends of the Dark King: A Fist of the North Star Story	Souther		
2012	Gintama: The Movie	Kotaro Katsura		
2012	Hakuōki	Sanosuke Harada		
2012	Un-Go	Myoshin Oono		
		One Piece	Gin	Funimation dub
	Clannad	Yusuke Yoshino	also movie	
	Maria Holic	Toichiro Kanae		
	From the New World	Niimi		
	Hakkenden: Eight Dogs of the East	Keno Inusaka	Season 1, was replaced by Ian Sinclair in Season 2	
	Horizon in the Middle of Nowhere	Muneshige Tachibana		
	Penguindrum	Kanba Takakura		
	Devil Survivor 2: The Animation	The Anguished One		
	Hiro no Kakera	Suguru Omi	also season 2	
	Tears to Tiara	Arawn		
