= Nui! =

Japanese manga series

ぬい!
- Genre: Fantasy comedy
- Manga
- Written by: Natsumi Mukai
- Published by: Jive
- English publisher: NA: Broccoli Books
- Magazine: Comic Rush
- Original run: June 26, 2006 – September 26, 2007
- Volumes: 3

Nui! (ぬい!) is a Japanese manga series written and illustrated by Natsumi Mukai. It was serialized in Jive's Comic Rush magazine from June 2006 to September 2007 and published in three volumes. It follows a girl named Kaya who, on her sixteenth birthday, discovers that her stuffed animal Purple is alive and has been secretly protecting her.

== Plot ==
The plot centers around Kaya and her three stuffed animals: Purple, Gray, and Aqua. Because Kaya loves and cares for her stuffed animals so much they are able to have souls, as long as Kaya keeps loving them their souls will be allowed to live on. As the legend goes, if a stuffed animal experiences a 'High Emotional Moment' they can then do a 'Human Transform' in which they are able to become human for a short period of time. As Kaya and her stuffed animals go on adventures they meet other stuffed animals and their owners. Finding out along the way that although some are nice, there are others who are not so kind, meaning Purple, Gray and Aqua are frequently forced to protect Kaya whilst struggling to keep their secret identities hidden from the rest of the world.

== Characters ==
Kaya Yamase
A girl who just turned sixteen and has discovered her dolls are alive. When she was little she found Purple abandoned on a dirt floor. Assuming that he was "dead" she buried him until an elderly woman claimed that in doing so, the doll would curse her. Apologizing to the doll, she later took Purple in as her first stuffed animal. She has black hair that is tied back and blue eyes.
Purple
Kaya's first stuffed animal. Because he has been with Kaya much longer than the other two stuffed animals Kaya owns, he often shows more determination to protect Kaya from dangers. He is depicted as a cotton purple doll with long, spotted ears and tail. In his human form, he has pale hair and eyes and his spotted ears turn into a cap.
Gray
Another one of Kaya's dolls, he seems to be a wool-made, gray dog. He is very loyal and was made by Kaya's mother. In human form, he has shaggy black hair, dog ears, and a collar around his neck.
Aqua
A blue polyester fish stuffed animal that belongs to Kaya, he was bought at an aquarium. He often longs to swim in the ocean (he can't or else he will get wet) and succeeds in one chapter when he is sealed in a plastic bag. In his human form he has long, pale hair and a fish necklace.
Pink
A pink Pegasus girl stuffed animal made by Kaya. She came alive the time she was born when Kaya had developed feelings for Shinri Harihara. She is the only girl stuffed animal and has a sweet demeanor.
Tetsu Tsuchida
Tetsu is a schoolmate of Kaya and lives and works at a craft shop. He likes Kaya and wants to be friends with her, but he is too timid to approach her at first.
Shinri Harihara
He creates stuffed animals and knows that they have a soul when their creator loves them. Shinri is nice to Kaya, but he wants Purple to be eliminated. He dropped out of middle school to make stuffed animals.
Bianca/Nera
Both the same stuffed animal, he lives with Shinri. When Bianca (in white) turns black, his personality turns aggressive. He has wings and as such is able to fly.

== Publication ==
Written and illustrated by Natsumi Mukai, the series began serialization in Jive's Comic Rush magazine on June 26, 2006. The manga completed its serialization on September 26, 2007.

At San Diego Comic-Con 2007, Broccoli Books announced that they licensed the series for English publication.

=== Volumes ===
No.	Original release date	Original ISBN	English release date	English ISBN
1	December 7, 2006	978-4-86-176362-5	May 28, 2008	978-1-59-741184-4
2	May 7, 2007	978-4-86-176393-9	—	—
3	December 7, 2007	978-4-86-176468-4	—	—

== Reception ==
Katherine Dacey of School Library Journal praised the artwork, characters, and story, though she criticized the use of stalking as a plot device and the fan service. Faustine Lillaz of Planete BD liked the artwork and story, though she felt it had too many similarities to Mukai's previous manga +Anima. A columnist for Manga News felt the story was childish but nevertheless entertaining and; they also described the artwork as "cute".
