= Nerima Daikon Brothers =

Japanese manga and anime series

- Cover artwork from the DVD release featuring (from left to right) Mako, Hideki and Ichiro.

おろしたてミュージカル 練馬大根ブラザーズ (Oroshitate Myūjikaru Nerima Daikon Burazāzu)
- Genre: Comedy, musical
- Manga
- Written by: Takamitsu Kondō
- Published by: Jive
- Magazine: Comic Rush
- Original run: December 2005 – May 2006
- Volumes: 5
- Anime television series
- Directed by: Shinichi Watanabe
- Produced by: Seiji Mitsunobu; Masatoshi Fujimoto
- Written by: Yoshio Urasawa
- Music by: F☆CK
- Studio: Studio Hibari
- Licensed by: NA: Crunchyroll; UK: Anime Limited
- Original network: TV Tokyo
- Original run: 9 January 2006 – 27 March 2006
- Episodes: 12

Nerima Daikon Brothers (おろしたてミュージカル 練馬大根ブラザーズ, Oroshitate Myūjikaru Nerima Daikon Burazāzu; lit. Dress-up Musical Nerima Daikon Brothers) is a Japanese manga and anime comedy series that follows the adventures of two brothers (and their cousin) Hideki, Ichiro, and Mako who form the band, "Nerima Daikon Brothers."

The show uses a musical comedy format, with the characters often breaking out in song to show their emotions or go through a montage scene. The melodies of the songs are sometimes recycled episode after episode with different lyrics substituted for the particular situation. The musical comedy format is rare in Japanese animation and the show's style is heavily influenced by musicals such as The Blues Brothers and Kollywood musicals such as Muthu.

The show was originally licensed by ADV for $124,800 and the first volume was released on DVD in December 2006. In 2008, the show became one of the ADV titles transferred to Funimation Entertainment.

== Plot ==
The trio lives on a stage constructed in Hideki's daikon patch in the Nerima ward of Tokyo. They dream of building a concert dome on the site and performing their musical act to sold-out crowds. They must avoid both an overzealous policewoman who has caught on to their money-making schemes and the desires of powerful people who want to take over the daikon field. The characters are aided in their adventures by the show's director, Shinichi Watanabe, who injects himself (in the form of his Nabeshin character from Excel Saga) into the story as a rental shop owner.

The show parodies many famous people and institutions in Japan including Junichiro Koizumi and his political followers; Michael Jackson; the fortune teller Kazuko Hosoki, Star Wars, Host club entertainers among many others. Nerima Daikon Brothers features off-color sexual humor, as when the first episode depicts a male casting director comically groping Ichiro's crotch, and the series also satirizes news topics of the time such as consumer credit or the success of Korean artists in Japan such as Bae Yong-joon. Such a topical comedy style was formerly uncommon in television anime.

== Characters ==
=== Main cast ===
Hideki (ヒデキ)

- Voiced by: Shigeru Matsuzaki (Japanese); Greg Ayres (English)

The protagonist, Hideki, is a 25-year-old owner of a daikon field in the Nerima ward of Tokyo, a region famous for growing Daikon. As children Hideki, Ichiro, and Mako made a pact to one day perform in a concert in a dome where the Daikon field now sits. One of the running gags in the series is Hideki's crush on Mako, his cousin. He would like to marry her, but he believes that he cannot because of the Japanese constitution. He is even tricked by a lawyer who tells him that he can change the constitution, even though such marriage is indeed permitted.
Ichiro (イチロー, Ichirō)

- Voiced by: Shotaro Morikubo (Japanese); Christopher Patton (English)

The straight man of the group, Ichiro is the soft-spoken head host at "Club Echo da Ekoda", a host club where good looking young men wine and dine older ladies. He saves his tips and salary from his job at the host club in order to fulfill the goal of building the dome and had amassed at least 23,000 yen by episode 10 when it was stolen (by Mako!). Ichiro has some strange habits, such as his love for Pandaikon and his pet aegagropila (that he raises in a glass jar), and, more generally, a fondness for furry animals that borders on zoophilia. His strangest ability is his power to make any person fall in love with him when he slaps them. Mako is usually the one at the receiving end of this, but he also took on a group of Oizumi's riot police before being finally taken down by a water cannon.
Mako (マコ)

- Voiced by: Ayano Matsumoto (Japanese); Luci Christian (English)

The self-styled "former idol," Mako is Ichiro and Hideki's (self-proclaimed) 19-year-old cousin who is originally from Okayama prefecture and still has the distinct Okayama dialect of Japanese (portrayed as a Southern American English in the English dub). She is skillfully able to spend her older cousin's money on her lavish "Dom Perignon" tastes, but often deflects his marriage proposals by saying "the Japanese constitution does not allow it!," despite the fact that it does. She's attracted to Ichiro even though he does not return her affections and fights over him with Yukika.
Pandaikon (パンダイコン)

- Voiced by: Yuriko Togashi (Japanese); Kira Vincent-Davis (English)

A panda who showed up at Hideki's daikon field one day and began eating the crop. Ichiro saved him from the others. He has daikon leaves spouting from his head. A new "member" of the band, he often appears when the group need help getting out of a pinch.
Officer Yukika Karakuri (カラクリユキカ, Karakuri Yukika) a.k.a. Inspector Widgett (in series)

- Voiced by: Marina Inoue (Japanese); Carli Mosier (English)

A bumbling, but sexy policewoman, Yukika was initially suspicious of the Nerima Daikon Brothers after a series of suspicious building collapses that were the results of the Brothers schemes came to her attention. She disguises herself as "Deb Sukerno" a.k.a. "Lady Deb" (a parody of Japanese socialite Dewi Sukarno, a wife of Sukarno.) She eventually becomes an admirer of the group, especially Pandaikon and Ichiro. She uses mechanical gadgets. She also keeps two mechanical pets Karakuri 1 and Karakuri 2. The Japanese public often refers to her as "Lady Dewi," another reference to Dewi Sukarno.
Rental Shop Owner

- Voiced by: Shinichi Watanabe (Japanese); Brett Weaver (English)

As in previous series the show's director, Shinichi Watanabe, injects himself into the show. In Nerima Daikon Brothers he appears as the owner of the Nine-Dragons Rental Shop where he usually appears behind a window in silhouette. The characters come to him when they are in need of something to get out of trouble. The characters "entertain" the director with song and dance (and sometimes a bit of skin.) The items that Watanabe lends often get the characters into more trouble than they are worth, but they always get the character out of the predicament. The characters call him "Oya-san" meaning "Mr. Shop Owner" and he's called "Pops" in the English dub.
Money Man & Bank Dancers

- Voiced by: Sailor King (Japanese); David Devaney, Jr. (English)

When a character in the show, usually Hideki, runs out of money this shadowy character abruptly shows up with a group of playboy-style dancers who sing and dance around an automated teller machine and usually forces the character into making a loan from the Nerima Agricultural Bank. The dancers and their theme song are parodies of the Takefuji Corporation, a consumer credit company. For around a decade, the firm aired commercials of scantily clad women "gyrating through a dynamic routine choreographed for maximum exposure." The commercials were removed from the airwaves after bank president Yasuo Takei was convicted of wiretapping. The commercials were later reinstated with a new cast of dancers.

=== Main antagonists ===
Nabeo Donabesawa

- Voiced by: Tetsu Inada (Japanese); Jim McClellan (English)

One of Oizumi's two henchmen sent to distract the Nerima Daikon Brothers. He's refers to himself as

Donabenabe

Donabenabe the owner of the Nerima Tsuushin a tabloid newspaper that prints fabricated stories about celebrities. In order to obtain the land around the daikon field he published falsehoods in the paper like "daikon carry the plague" or "Piro Piro Bacteria". He also owns a female softball team called the "Nerima Donabes" and he approaches Hideki about building a baseball stadium in the daikon field. He took too long to cement the deal and Oizumi intervened. The character is a parody of "Nabetsune" (Tsuneo Wanatabe 渡邉恒雄) media giant and president of the company that publishes the Yomiuri Shimbun and which owns the Yomiuri Giants. Nabetsune is actively involved in both the newspaper and the baseball team.

Yūkel Hakushon

- Voiced by: Hiro Yuki (Japanese); Mike McFarland (English)

The second of Oizumi's two henchmen sent to distract the Nerima Daikon Brothers. He is a pop-star who is world-famous for plastic surgery and has come to Japan to escape "adults" and turn Hideki's Daikon field into "Nerima-Land." He convinces Mako (who he calls "Wendy") that she will once again become an idol with his help. He's an obvious parody of Michael Jackson. His face resembles a Picasso painting and he dresses in a pink Peter-Pan-style costume. and at one point his nose is knocked off in a fight. The character also references songs from Thriller and Bad and ends every sentence with the interjection "Ow!"

Prime Minister Oizumi

- Voiced by: Kazuki Yao (Japanese); Andy McAvin (English)

The lead antagonist. He is flanked by Madonna Diet Members. In order to privatize Nerima, he send out his subordinates to attempt to acquire the daikon field. He reveals that his true goal for the field is to build a shrine to the daikon in order to hold a yearly festival for veneration of the vegetable. A battle royal ensues between with the Brothers, Yukika, pandas, and dancing girls fighting Oizumi's supporters and the Japan Self-Defense Forces. When all looks lost, Nabeshin shows up with a final weapon—a microphone that lets them sing of their dream. Oizumi likes their song and abruptly changes his mind about taking the daikon field and calls for a retreat.

=== Guest characters ===
The show's producers used both veteran and up-in-coming voice actors to fill in the guest roles for each weekly episode who were usually the characters who swindled the Brothers out of money. This type of casting has been used in other recent productions by Yoshio Urasawa, the series script writer and series coordinator. Roles are listed by episode number.

1. Casting Director Voiced by: Tesshō Genda (Japanese); Leo Allan (English)

A parody of controversial boy-band manager Johnny Kitagawa.

2. Korean Pachinko Parlor Owner Voiced by: Kazuhiko Inoue (Japanese); Mark X. Laskowski (English)

A parody of Bae Yong-joon, a Korean actor popular in Japan.

3. Hospital Director Voiced by: Keiko Yamamoto (Japanese); Deb Haas (English)
3. Chief Doctor Voiced by: Misa Watanabe (Japanese); Sofia Mendez (English)
4. Police Chief Voiced by: Riichi Mishimoto (Japanese); John Swasey (English)
4. Yakuza Boss Voiced by: Daisuke Ono (Japanese); John Gremillion (English)
5. No.1 Voiced by: Chihiro Suzuki (Japanese); Illich Guardiola (English)
5. The Iron-Handed Wife Voiced by: Junko Takeuchi (Japanese); Marcy Rae (English)
6. Madame Gokutsobushi Voiced by: Chika Sakamoto (Japanese); Monica Rial (English)

A parody of Kazuko Hosoki, a Japanese fortune teller and "Iron Chef" judge. The word "tsubushi" means "good-for-nothing" in Japanese.

7. Attorney Kakuhama Voiced by: Tomohiro Nishimura (Japanese); Vic Mignogna (English)

Parody of Kazuya Maruyama, a famous Japanese lawyer and television personality. The word Kakuhama means "beach bum" in Japanese.

7. Miyo-chan Voiced by: Miyu Matsuki (Japanese); Brittney Karbowski (English)
8. Discount Store Owner Voiced by: Mitsuaki Madono (Japanese); David Born (English)

A parody of "Don Quijote" a discount store chain in Japan.

== Political references ==
A parody of a famous Koizumi press photo.

The final episode of the series contains many references and criticisms of politics of Japanese Prime Minister Koizumi.

The episode begins with the cliffhanger from episode 11 where Prime Minister "Oizumi" loudly proclaimed "I will privatize Nerima!" (私は練馬を民営化します!) from the National Diet Building (which is propelled by jet engines high above the city.) Shortly thereafter troops, tanks, aircraft, and even ships begin swarming the (inland) ward forcing the city to privatize. Later he uses a bad pun on the word privatize (民営化, mineika): Everyone in agreement will experience the pleasant feeling of a good mood! (皆で ええ感じに いい気分で 快感を味わう, Minna de ee kanji ni iikibun de kaikan o ajiwau.) This pun mirror's Koizumi's catch-phrase From public to private (官から民へ, kan kara min e) in his goal of privatizing the Japanese postal system.

Shishiro – a character marketed by Koizumi's Liberal Democratic Party.

The episode also plays heavily on the Koizumi's "lion" theme. His face is caricatured with a lion nose and lion whiskers. Koizumi gained the nickname because of his lion-like mane of hair. Koizumi and his party have embraced the nickname. Koizumi himself pens an e-mail column called "Lion Heart." His party also produced and marketed a lion-character with Koizumi's face called "Shishiro". The episode features Koizumi's supporters dressed in lion costumes, very similar to Shishiro, who go after the Brothers.

In addition, this episode makes reference to several happenings of the 2005 general election. Koizumi called the election after bills to privatize Japan Post were voted down in the upper house. In order to defeat those who had voted against the measure, Koizumi employed "a star-studded cast of female candidates..., now ubiquitously referred to in the national media as Koizumi's assassins (shikoku), [whose] mission [was] to take out the prime minister's political enemies in the old boys' network that long held sway over the LDP." Koizumi had also instructed one of the candidates "to pitch herself to voters as 'the Madonna of reform'." Finally there is the term, "Koizumi children", the "83 new LDP Diet members... [who are] basically a cult of personality, these rookies need a manual to know what to say to the media, and applauded ecstatically during the prime minister's 26 Sep policy speech. These things are heavily referenced in the final episode. Oizumi is flanked by a cast of female Diet members who repeat every word he says. He calls Yūkel and Donabe his "children." And when he needs assistance in taking the daikon field he sends his "assassins", dressed in lion suits, to beat up the hold-outs.

== Broadcast and release information ==
=== Manga ===
A manga version was published in Jive's Monthly Comic Rush and was published monthly from December 2005 until May 2006 according to the publisher's website. The manga was drawn by Takamitsu Kondō and conceived by Aniplex and Studio Hibari.

=== Anime ===
The series that aired from 2006, 9 January until 2006, 27 March and was originally broadcast of the TV Tokyo system. Various other regional broadcast systems around Japan re-broadcast the show. Because the 30-minute show contains risqué humor it was broadcast at the 1:30 time slot in Tokyo.

- TV Tokyo 2006, 9 to 2 January, 006, 27 March Sundays 1:30 to 2:00
- TV Aichi 2006, 12 to 2 January, 006, 30 March Wednesdays 1:58 to 2:28
- TV Osaka 2006, 13 to 2 January, 006, 31 March Mondays 2:00 to 2:30
- AT-X 2006, 2 to 2 February, 006, 20 April Wednesdays 10:30 to 11:00

A live-action music video was produced with the three main voice actors performing the introduction song "Ma Ji Ya Ba" for which a single was released. A two DVD set of the show has been released. A full soundtrack CD of the show's songs is currently being produced.

Originally there were 13 episode planned, however, there was only a 12-week slot open for the show on TV Tokyo. The 13th episode was mentioned at the 2006 Tokyo Animation Fair. It was supposed to feature a young venture company president as the target character who tried to acquire the daikon field. (This is reference to Takafumi Horie and his company Livedoor which was in the news with a recent stock scandal.)

==== Episode titles and ratings ====
The show was lauded at first for its novelty as a musical anime and gags on taboo topics. However, the ratings began to dive as the series got repetitive due to the reuse of songs in every episode and the quality of the animation declining.

No.	English title	Japanese title	Week	Rank *	Rating Data
01	Please Touch My Nerima Daikon	俺の練馬大根をおさわりください	1/18	#3	6257 [222.5res/m] (debut)
02	Sa Rang Hey Yo with My Balls	俺のお玉でサランヘヨ	1/15	#1	6543 [218.1res/m] (+286)
03	My Shot Will Crash into Your Backside	俺のお注射お尻にクラッシュ	1/22	#3	5845 [194.8res/m] (−698)
04	My Gadget (Detective) is Huge, Huh?	俺のカラクリ刑事(デカ)いでしょ	1/29	#5	5476 [182.5res/m] (−369)
05	Roll Mine, No.1	俺のを転がせNo.1	2/05	#5	4996 [166.5res/m] (−480)
06	My Backroom Fortune-Telling	俺のウラウラうらない	2/12	#3	5653 [188.4res/m] (+657)
07	Play with Mine! Sue Me!	俺ので奏でて! 訴えて!	2/19	#4	5024 [167.5res/m] (+629)
08	My Dirt-Cheap Rocket is About to Launch!	俺の激安ロケット発射寸前!	2/26	#4	4780 [159.3res/m] (−244)
09	Cook Up an Erection in Mine!	俺のをなべなべおっ立てろ!	3/05	#7	3795 [126.5res/m] (−985)
10	Give My "Bad" a Thrilla-Thriller! ♪	俺のバッドをスリスリらー♪	3/12	n/a	4659 [no data](+864)
11	A Threesome in My Dome?!	俺のドームで3人プレイ!?	3/19	#3	4622 [154.1res/m] (−37)
12	My Finish! Take a Look at This!	俺のフィニッシュ! 見ておくんなま!	3/26	n/a	nodata

- Note: This from a ranking of animated programs in the Tokyo area only.
- Also note: The English titles are not exact translations, however are the actual English titles.

==== Theme songs ====
The three main voice actors perform in the music video of Ma·Ji·Ya·Ba

- Opening theme

The song debuted on the Oricon rating system at 44. Shigeru Matsuzaki last made the charts in 1978 with "The Ballad of the Lie". The Oricon press release for the song mentions that this is likely the first time that an artist has been made an appearance in the top fifty with a gap of 30 years between songs.

"Ma·Ji·Ya·Ba"

Composer: Kaneko Takahiro
Lyrics：Tasuya Ishii
Vocals：Nerima Daikon Brothers (Ayano Matsumoto, Shigeru Matsuzaki, & Shoutarou Morikubo)

- Ending theme

"Very Ma.."

Composer: Takeshi Fujii (composer)
Lyrics: Hiiro Misaki
Vocals：Nerima Daikon Brothers (Ayano Matsumoto, Shigeru Matsuzaki, & Shoutarou Morikubo)

ADV's dub includes English versions of the opening and closing themes as well as all songs in every episode. The only exception is the Prime Minister's theme in the final episodes, which was embedded in the Music and Effects track and could not be dubbed. The OP and ED themes are performed in English by Greg Ayres, Christopher Patton and Luci Christian.

== See also ==
- Nerima—A ward of Tokyo where the show takes place
- Daikon
- Junichiro Koizumi
- Shinichi Watanabe
