= Ozanari Dungeon =

Japanese manga series

- Volume 1 tankōbon cover of Ozanari Dungeon

おざなりダンジョン (Ozanari Danjon)
- Genre: Sword and sorcery
- Manga
- Written by: Motoo Koyama
- Published by: Gakken (before 1998); Biblos (1998–2006); Jive (after 2006)
- Magazine: Monthly Comic Nora
- Original run: November 1987 – November 1996
- Volumes: 17
- Original video animation

Ozanari Dungeon: The Tower of Wind
- Directed by: Hiroshi Aoyama
- Written by: Fumihiko Shimo, Hideki Sonoda
- Studio: Telecom Animation Film
- Released: 27 September 1991 – 20 December 1991
- Runtime: 30 minutes each
- Episodes: 3
- Manga

Nariyuki Dungeon
- Written by: Motoo Koyama
- Published by: Gakken
- Magazine: Monthly Comic Nora
- Original run: 1997 – 1998
- Volumes: 3
- Manga

Naozari Dungeon
- Written by: Motoo Koyama
- Published by: Jive
- Magazine: Comic Rush
- Original run: 2006 – 2010
- Volumes: 8
- Manga

Ozanari Dungeon Special
- Written by: Motoo Koyama
- Published by: Jive
- Published: 2008
- Volumes: 1
- Manga

Ozanari Dungeon Tactics
- Written by: Motoo Koyama
- Published by: Jive
- Magazine: Comic Rush
- Original run: 2010 – 2013
- Volumes: 6
- Manga

Ozanari Dungeon Tactics
- Written by: Motoo Koyama
- Published by: Jive
- Magazine: Comic Rush
- Original run: 2010 – 2013
- Volumes: 6
- Manga

Ozanari Dungeon Cloud Pangea
- Written by: Motoo Koyama
- Published by: Jive
- Published: 2016
- Volumes: 1
- icon

Ozanari Dungeon (Japanese: おざなりダンジョン, Hepburn: Ozanari Danjon) is a comedy fantasy manga series by Motoo Koyama which was serialized in Monthly Comic Nora from November 1987 to November 1996. The manga series was adapted into a three-episode OVA series titled Ozanari Dungeon: The Tower of Wind (おざなりダンジョン 風の塔, Ozanari Danjon: Kaze no Tō) from Toshiba EMI.

== Premise, Setting, Plot ==
Ozanari Dungeon is an adventure manga set in a fantastical Sword and Sorcery world while occasionally showing a few pieces of anachronistic technologies such as missiles and airships.

This manga follows the adventures of a group of mercenaries: the barbarian Mocha (the main character), the rogue Blueman, and the mage Kiriman. Mocha and her gang belong to a mercenary guild. Their main concern is gold, but they will help to save the day even if the troubles don't concern them.

In early phases of the first manga, the stories are self-contained and have little connection with each other. In that phase, the tone and atmosphere tend to the light-hearted and episodic. The art style develops over the course of the manga. The plot becomes much more refined as well. After volume 10 or so, the plot becomes more profound, deep, and heavier on continuity. The scale becomes quite large, with whole nations going to war and dragon(s) which can destroy the world.

== Characters ==
=== Protagonists ===
Mocha (モカ, Moka)
Mocha is a fighter of an indeterminant long-eared race, and she acts as the melee combatant in the Dungeons & Dragons "Fighter-Mage-Thief" party formation. She has great physical strength, yet little intelligence. Despite her very revealing armor, she is very innocent and naive. The first manga shows snippets of her past with her mentor and father figure, a legendary gladiator and adventurer, Salvador. She is named after a coffee type, Mocha.
Blueman (ブルーマン, Burūman)
Blueman is Nekomatango (a cat-like race) rogue and acts as a thief. His full name is Blue Manjaro, a mashup of the coffee types Blue Mountain and Kilimanjaro.
Kilimon (キリマン, Kiriman)
Kilimon is an Inumoarukeba (a dog-like race) magician and acts as a mage. He always "talks" with a written sign. His full name is Kilie Mountain, which, like Blueman, is mashup of the coffee types Blue Mountain and Kilimanjaro.
Esprit (エスプレ, Esupure)
Esprit is a member of Magic Academy and thus an Astral, a transforming spirit who can exist without a physical body. He passes off as a longsword so he can follow and observe Mocha and her gang incognito. He is named after a coffee type, Espresso.

=== Supporting characters ===
- Kain

Kain is a bookish human prince who is smitten with Mocha. In a bid to win Mocha's heart, he trains under Falco and Keaton and starts adventuring.

- Falco

Falco is a master swordsman and veteran adventurer. He is engaged to Azusa.

- Azusa

Azusa is a heiress to a ninja clan. She is engaged to Falco.

- Keaton

Sword Buster Keaton is a veteran adventurer. Though he looks like an expressionless airhead, he is one of the most skilled fighters in the guild
