= Akai Ito (video game) =

2004 video game

- Developer: Success Corporation
- Publishers: Success Corporation; Hamster
- Designer: Hal
- Platforms: PlayStation 2, Microsoft Windows, Nintendo Switch
- Release: PlayStation 2: JP: October 21, 2004; JP: October 27, 2005 (SuperLite 2000 Series); PlayStation Network: JP: October 16, 2013; HD Remastered: WW: May 24, 2023
- Genres: Visual novel, adventure, horror, yuri
- Mode: Single-player

Akai Ito (アカイイト; lit. 'Red Thread') is a Japanese horror adventure game by Success Corporation, released exclusively for the PlayStation 2 in Japan on October 21, 2004. A reduced price "popular edition", included in developer and publisher SUCCESS' SuperLite 2000 Series, was released on October 27, 2005. The title refers to the mythical red string of fate.

A remastered "HD" version for the Nintendo Switch and PC, along with its younger "sister-game" Aoi Shiro, was released on May 24, 2023. It has English language option and was released outside Japan.

== Story ==
After the death of her mother, orphaned high school student Kei Hatō heads for her late father's house in Hemizuka to settle issues with her inheritance. In the train on the way there, Kei has a mysterious dream of a huge tree and a woman who seems to be lost in sadness. In Hemizuka, Kei learns the secret concealed in her own blood through various meeting with an Oni Slayer, a friend of her late mother, a young girl accompanied by a white fox, and even the mysterious girl from her dreams. Throughout the story Kei is antagonized by the twin oni Nozomi and Mikage. Akai Ito's story varies greatly based upon the player's decisions, which not only affect the flow of the story but also the ending the player receives (several of which suggest romantic feelings among the female characters).

== Character ==
Akai Ito's main characters, as depicted in the novel adaptation

- Kei Hatō (羽藤桂) (CV: Miyu Matsuki)

The main character of the story, Kei is a rather careless person, which is quite ironic considering her favorite phrase is "always be prepared".

- Yumei (ユメイ) (CV: Yūko Minaguchi)

The mysterious girl from Kei's dreams.

- Uzuki Senba (千羽烏月) (CV: Akeno Watanabe)

The Oni Slayer Kei meets at the train station, her sword is the bane of the oni.

- Tsuzura Wakasugi (若杉葛) (CV: Rie Kugimiya)

A girl half Kei's age, accompanied by a white fox. Kei meets her in her father's now abandoned house.

- Sakuya Asama (浅間サクヤ) (CV: Asami Sanada)

A friend of Kei's deceased mother. She goes by the nickname "West".

- Nozomi, Mikage (ノゾミ・ミカゲ) (CV: Megumi Kobayashi)

Twin oni and the antagonists of the story.

- Kei (ケイ) (CV: Kazutaka Ishii)

A mysterious male, later known as Kei's brother called Hakuka.

- Mayumi Hatō (羽藤真弓) (CV: Nana Furuhara)
- Yōko Nara (奈良陽子) (CV: Mamiko Noto)
- Rin Tōgo (東郷凛) (CV: Miyuki Sawashiro)

== Staff ==
- Character design / Original picture: HAL
- Script: Tomoyuki Fumotogawa
- Music: MANYO (Little Wing)
- Background: J.C.Staff

== Music ==
- Opening theme song 『 Mawaru Sekai de (廻る世界で) 』 by Haruka Shimotsuki / Riya
- Ending theme song 『 Tabiji no Hate (旅路の果て) 』 by Haruka Shimotsuki / Riya

== Adaptations ==
=== Manga ===
Akai Ito has also received several manga adaptations: a one-shot by Muttri Moony published in the July 2004 issue of Yuri Shimai, by the name "Swear"; and a short manga published in the May and June 2007 issues of Monthly Comic Rush. A special anthology was created for a limited edition, featuring various stories from different artists.

=== Web novel ===
A free web novel of Akai Ito was released on Success' official Akai Ito website, and follows one of the storylines accessible when playing the video game.

=== Drama CD ===
One drama CD has been released. It was first released as a Limited Edition version in October 2005 and later a regular version was released on December 26, 2006.
