= My Dearest Devil Princess =

Japanese manga series

箱入りデビルプリンセス (Hakoiri Debiru Purinsesu)
- Genre: Comedy, Romance, Supernatural
- Manga
- Written by: Makoto Matsumoto
- Illustrated by: Maika Netsu
- Published by: Jive
- Magazine: Comic Rush
- Original run: 2004 – 2007
- Volumes: 9

My Dearest Devil Princess (箱入りデビルプリンセス, lit. Devil Princess in the Box) is a manga series licensed under Broccoli Books, created by Makoto Matsumoto, with Maika Netsu as the artist. It was first serialized in Comic Rush in 2004. Nine volumes have been published so far. The series has been currently discontinued as Comic Rush is no longer publishing.

== Plot synopsis ==
The series follows the life of High School student Keita Kusakabe, who is given a magical box by his friend and fellow student Natsuki Morishima. Keita has obtained the box in hopes that, as per legend, his wishes will be granted. He opens the box and out pops Maki a powerful devil, she at first tells Keita she's a genie that will grant three wishes whatever they may be. At first Keita can't decide what he wants and decides to sleep on it, later the next day Keita accidentally walks in on Maki who has just finished taking a shower. Now that she is without clothes Keita spots Maki's wings and tail, and realizes that she is in fact a devil.

Maki reveals that once Keita has used all three wishes, she will take his soul. Unfortunately for her evil plans, she is inexperienced and doesn't even know how to be evil. She must stay with Keita until she can trick him into making his third wish while also teaching herself to be evil, but matters are complicated further when she starts falling in love with him.

== Characters ==
=== Main ===
Maki
She is a devil princess from the demon world. She grew up sheltered by her parents and doesn't really know how to be evil or any of the common actions, relying all of her information on a book her mother gave that is usually greatly misinformed with perverted suggestions on how to get Keita's soul. Keita accidentally summoned her from a box he was forced to buy from Natsuki. She will grant any wish Keita has, yet will take his soul after the third wish. She is unable to cry due to Keita's accidental first wish, which he begged that she would stop crying, and despite needed for him to wish, will often help him without him doing so. Maki wears a ring on each finger that limits her powers, and is able to summon small spirits to assist her. It is obvious she has fallen in love with Keita, however due to her sheltered life growing up is completely oblivious to this, often wondering why her chest hurts when he is being seduced by another woman or why she is now nervous at the idea of getting naked in front of Keita, despite doing it often before. She was known to be very cute when she was a child. She is one of the candidates to become the next demon queen in her home world.
Keita
He is a human teenager who accidentally summoned Maki. This happened by accident when he opened a box he was forced to by from Natsuki. At first, he thought she was a genie for granting three wishes, until he saw the wings on her back and realized she is a Devil and he will die after his third wish is granted. However, despite the fact that she will take his soul, he genuinely cares for her, even falling in love with her, later admitting he will only give his soul to Maki. At school he is on the track team despite he is a slow runner, as the only memory he has of his mother was how she praised his running. Though Maki has suggested he just use one of his wishes to become the best runner, he turns it down, wishing to get better through his own strength and hard work, feeling as wishing for it wouldn't make it count. He actually does become a faster runner in later chapters, able to outrun Hayami who is one of the fastest runners in the school, as well as getting much faster when it is to help someone he cares for. He later becomes the owner of Miki during a dispute. It is later revealed by Alpha that his mother was an angel, which makes his soul highly sought after. In order to protect Maki from harm, Keita uses his second wish and is now armed with the most powerful weapon from Hell, the Lance of Longinus. However, he is only able to use it if Maki is in danger.

=== Devils ===
Devil Queen
Ruler of all devils and Maki's mother. Despite her dark towering appearance she is a very loving mother to her only daughter, often trying to help her get Keita's soul through the use of a book, however her information is usually very misinformed with sexual seducing techniques that seems to be taken from stereotypical romance story scenes. She also created many treaties between the angels and demons and single handedly stopped the countless wars between the two.
Miki
She is another candidate to be the next demon queen. She tries to get in Maki's way so that Maki will lose and Miki will become Queen instead. She is summoned by an antique incense stand. Through tricking Keita she too becomes contracted to him. She tries to get Keita to make a wish by annoying him and only stopping if he makes a wish.
Pazu
A wind spirit and one of the twelve spirits that Maki can summon with her powers. Resembles a fairy.
Tarot
The spirit of dragons. He was summoned alongside Tarte to save Keita from Sheeta. He wears a tuxedo, top hat, eyepatch, a large snake, and one horn on the side of his head, opposite of Tarte's.
Tarte
The spirit of love, who is also known as Moon Demon Astarte. She was summoned alongside Tarot. She appears to have an attraction to Keita, as she is usually seen around him. Like Tarot, she has a large snake and one horn on the side of her head on the opposite side.
Levi
A Samurai-spirit based upon the biblical creature Leviathan. Levi has a dragon-like tail and travels around as a master-less, wandering samurai. Maki gave Levi to Keita to protect him and her summon box in a dangerous situation. He is so far the only male spirit beside Tarot and completely infatuated with Maki, often latching onto her large breasts.

=== Angels ===
Sheeta
She is an angel determined to remove Maki from the human world and to save Keita's soul. Despite being an angel, she acts nothing of the sort: wanting to kill Keita to save him from his contract, tricking the student council into torturing Maki, and living in Hara's house uninvited. After the failed attempt in "saving" Keita, she has taken the job as his and Maki's homeroom teacher, and despite her vendetta towards the two is actually a well liked teacher in the school, though this due to memory manipulation. She is later recalled back to heaven after failing to complete her mission.
Natsuki
Keita's classmate and childhood friend. Hoping to make some money off her family's old belongings, she sells Keita items that happen to be possessed by supernatural beings. She is later revealed to be an Archangel whose true name is Alpha and sold him the items in her plan to get two Queen Candidates in one location. She seems to be a bit of a sadist, as she enjoyed torturing Sheeta for her failure and regularly wields a whip. Despite all this, she truly seems to love Keita, as she states she only allows Keita to call her Natsuki, and goes out of her way to be the one to get Keita's soul. It is later revealed she did all of this for Keita's mother, so that they would be able to see each other again. She was eventually defeated after Keita uses his second wish. Currently, she has backed off from taking Keita's soul.

=== Classmates ===
Hayami
He is the captain of the track team and the student body president. He also likes Keita, and confesses to him early on in the story, this always causing Keita to flee on sight when Hayami calls out to him. However, it is later revealed in Chapter 16 that this is not a sexual love, but an adoration towards Keita, as Keita reminds Hayami of a dog he used to have when he was a child, even having the same name. So he believes Keita is the reincarnation of his dog, which causes him to want to hold and pet Keita every time he sees him, something Keita doesn't seem to mind after having this all cleared up.
Haru
She is the vice president of the student council. Despite her beauty she is a vain manipulative narcissistic girl who enjoys how she is seen as the beauty of the school, and became extremely jealous at the thought that Maki was trying to take her position away. She has a crush on Hayami, because of this tries to attack or get rid of Maki as she assumed she was trying to steal him away, seeming to be unaware he is actually in love with Keita. Though after discovering this, she now has no resentment towards the demons, and only wishes to bring Hayami back to the "right side". Sheeta now lives with her through an Angel contract, must to her dismay.

=== Other ===
Keita's Dad
Keita's widowed father. He is a kind loving man who instantly takes a liking to Maki and lets her stay in his house, despite knowing that she is a Devil (to the extent of having dinner with Maki's spirits and even feeding Pazu). He sees her always trying her best and a kind sweet girl, practically accepting her as his daughter. He has yet shown any reaction towards Miki now living there, though when she first appeared he was excited to see his son getting the attention of so many girls. Apparently, he already knew that he had married an Angel and commented on why he never mentioned that fact to his son, "You already know how hard it is to date a girl with wings."
Noroi Masuzou
The son of a priest at a local shrine. He is very shy around people and has not attended school for a long period of time. Because Keita has many pretty girls about him, (or for any other reason), he has a habit of using a voodoo-type straw doll with his name on it in order to curse him and cause him pain. Surprisingly, this works on Keita, (most likely due to his half-angel status). However, his curse only works if he has the correct full name of the victim. After meeting with Maki, (and getting her name wrong as well), he seems to have become infatuated with her and has now returned to class.
