= Casshern Sins =

Japanese anime television series

- Cover of the first DVD volume, featuring the titular character Casshern (foreground), and Friender (background).

キャシャーン Sins (Kyashān Shinsu)
- Genre: Post-apocalyptic
- Created by: Tatsuo Yoshida
- Anime television series
- Directed by: Shigeyasu Yamauchi
- Produced by: Hiroyuki Oomori; Yasuhiro Kamima
- Written by: Yasuko Kobayashi
- Music by: Kaoru Wada
- Studio: Madhouse (Note: Animation.); Tatsunoko (Note: Production.)
- Licensed by: AUS: Siren Visual; NA: Crunchyroll; UK: Manga Entertainment
- Original network: TVS, MBS, TVA, CTC, tvk
- English network: US: Funimation Channel, Adult Swim (Toonami)
- Original run: October 1, 2008 – March 15, 2009
- Episodes: 24
- Manga
- Written by: Masaki Takei
- Published by: Jive
- Magazine: Comic Rush
- Original run: October 25, 2008 – July 26, 2009
- Volumes: 1

Casshern Sins (Japanese: キャシャーン Sins, Hepburn: Kyashān Shinsu) is a reboot of the 1973 anime series Casshan, produced by Tatsunoko Productions and animated by Madhouse, it aired from October 2008 to March 2009. The series made its English broadcast premiere on Funimation Channel in December 2010. A manga adaptation was published in Jive's Comic Rush Magazine.

The series discards the continuity presented in the original Casshan anime series, in which Casshern was a cybernetic superhero battling the evil robotic forces of Braiking Boss in a post-apocalyptic Earth. In Casshern Sins, Casshern is presented as a cyborg subordinate of Braiking Boss who was ordered to assassinate the savior of mankind, and has thus doomed the Earth to ruin.

== Plot ==
Casshern Sins tells the story of a world where robots subjugated humanity after becoming self-aware. Their leader, Braiking Boss, ruled over the world with an iron fist. One day, a mysterious girl named Luna was summoned by the people in order to bring the salvation of mankind. Fearing her as a potential threat, Braiking Boss sent three of his most powerful cyborg warriors – Casshern, Dio, and Leda – to dispose of Luna. Casshern, the strongest warrior, managed to track down and kill Luna. However, this triggered "the ruin", a cataclysmic event which set into motion the end of the world. The robots lost their ability to live indefinitely, and began rusting and dying. Hundreds of years later, the world's atmosphere is filled with poison, and, due to the inability of most remaining humans to reproduce, as well as the constant threat posed by the robots, humanity is on the brink of extinction.

Robots fare only slightly better, fearing death as much as humans do: the poisonous environment quickly causes their mechanical bodies to rust and corrode, forcing them to regularly replace their damaged parts, if spare parts in good condition can even be found. In this wretched time and place, Casshern, who had disappeared following the assassination of Luna, returns with no memory of who he is or what he had done. A rumor is spread that any robot who kills and eats Casshern will obtain eternal life, forcing Casshern to fight for his own life. Throughout the story, he seeks the truth about the past and tries to find meaning in the fervent will to live he sees in those around him.

== Characters ==
Casshern, without his combat helmet and facemask, meets with Ringo, a young girl.

=== Main characters ===
Casshern (キャシャーン, Kyashān)
Voiced by: Tōru Furuya (Japanese); Eric Vale (English)

The protagonist of the series. He was originally a subordinate of Braiking Boss and the strongest warrior in his robot army. With an advanced cybernetic body and quick reflexes, he can destroy any opponent he comes across. Casshern was ordered by Braiking Boss to assassinate Luna. However, this act triggered a cataclysmic event and Casshern disappeared. Returning hundreds of years later with no memory of who he was, he somehow holds the ability to painfully regenerate from any injury and goes violently berserk when incited. While he travels to discover what has happened, and to redeem himself, he encounters people who have been affected by the cataclysm. He is also confronted by many others who attempt to kill him in the belief that devouring him will save them from ruination. Saddened by the deaths of Lyuze and Ohji, he returns to Luna once more and reminds her that she is salvation to those wishing to find her, and he is death. Before he leaves to wander the world, he warns her that if she and her followers ever forget death, he will return.

Lyuze (リューズ, Ryūzu)
Voiced by: Nami Miyahara (Japanese); Brina Palencia (English)

A female robot, she pursues Casshern out of revenge for her sister. Before the cataclysm, her sister Liza was injured by Casshern while trying to protect Luna, and eventually died a slow death from corrosion. However, she hesitates when Casshern willingly allows her the chance to kill him, and is unwilling to do so. Instead, she begins to follow and accompany Casshern on his journey, eventually developing feelings for him. She finally finds Luna with the help of Casshern and the others, but loses respect and interest for Luna as soon as she discovers the true meaning of Luna's "salvation". She decides to live with Casshern, Ringo, Ohji, and Friender, to spend her last days with them, dying from the ruination. As she dies, she tells Casshern that she is happy that she was able to find peace with him.

Ringo (リンゴ)
Voiced by: Yūko Minaguchi (Japanese); Monica Rial (English)

A young girl who befriends Casshern, she manages to maintain her innocence despite growing up in a destroyed world. Despite witnessing Casshern mercilessly destroying a robot in order to save her and hurting her feelings, she continues to have faith in him. Being cared for by Ohji, the two come across Casshern regularly, and witness his endeavors. Devastated, Ringo grows up into a young woman, knowing and accepting death, waiting for Casshern's return. It is hinted, in her last encounter with Leda, that she may have been the baby in Leda's womb.

Ohji (オージ, Ōji)
Voiced by: Chō (Japanese); Jerry Russell (English)

A robot technician who spends his time maintaining robots, he is Ringo's guardian. Originally a scientist working under Braiking Boss, he created Casshern, Dio and Leda as an experiment in recreating robotic life in a manner similar to humanity's reproductive method, however Braiking Boss utilized the trio as an advanced strike team and ultimately assigned them the duty of assassinating Luna. Stricken by guilt over what he has caused, he attempts to kill himself, but finds Ringo as a baby and decides to raise her. After finding Casshern, he follows and watches over him. Near the end of the anime, he also loses interest in Luna's "salvation" and decides to live with the others, trying to make Ringo happy with anything he can do, until his ruin comes, devastating Ringo.

Friender (フレンダー, Furendā)

A robot dog who originally stayed with a robot community that peacefully accepted the idea of death. Friender himself does not display any signs of deterioration. After a berserk Casshern destroys the entire community, Friender cautiously follows him, eventually trusting him. He primarily intervenes to stop Casshern whenever he goes berserk.

=== Recurring characters ===
Luna (ルナ, Runa)
Voiced by: Akiko Yajima (Japanese); Trina Nishimura (English)

A mysterious girl summoned by the human race for salvation, Luna was known as "the sun that was named moon," and has been dubbed the "Source of Life" – a living embodiment for the world. Deeming her a threat, Braiking Boss sent Casshern, Dio, and Leda to assassinate her. Casshern successfully does so, triggering the destruction of the world. Amid hints that she continues to exist in some form, Casshern searches for her to find the cause of the state of the world, and the reason behind his apparent immortality. However, when he finds her, she has changed and her dislike of death leads her to kill anyone who reeks of death.
It is discovered that humans had learned the secret of eternal life when their medical technology advanced. Braiking Boss was repulsed by this and began the extermination of humans. Mankind barely managed to survive through Luna. She granted humans normal lifespans because she believed that without death, humans could not live. Braiking Boss sensed that a number of robots began to worship her as well, so he ordered her assassination which unknowingly set into motion the Ruin. After Casshern killed her, she mysteriously became disgusted and terrified of death and dying. She instead granted immortality to both humans and robots that she deemed to not be "reeking of death" or to those not too far into the suffering of the Ruin, as discovered when she refused to heal Dune. Luna sought to create a world free of death until all those dying of the Ruin would perish, leaving those who are immortal.

Braiking Boss (ブライキング・ボス, Buraikingu Bosu)
Voiced by: Kenji Utsumi (Japanese); J. Paul Slavens (English)

Braiking Boss was the leader and commander of the robot army. Having dominated humanity for ages, Luna was summoned to stop him. As the one who ordered Luna's assassination, he was the true cause of the world's destruction. Dismissing the rumors of the effects of devouring Casshern, he spends his time following him from afar, watching his actions. At the end of the anime, he and his army find salvation from Luna. As Casshern returns, destroying his army, Braiking Boss fights hopelessly against Casshern. His last words are an order to kill Luna to atone for his sin of causing the ruination of the world. As he dies, he feels content that he is finally receiving justice for causing the destruction of the world. Braiking Boss believed his death at the hands of his former subordinate was a form of divine retribution.

Dio (ディオ)
Voiced by: Toshiyuki Morikawa (Japanese); Jerry Jewell (English)

A robot built identical to Casshern. He, along with Casshern and Leda, were sent to kill Luna, but Dio failed to reach her before Casshern. Influenced by Leda, he plots to halt the ruination by exposing Casshern's secret and to rule the world, taking the place of Braiking Boss. As such, he attempts to organize a robot army. He holds animosity towards Casshern, as they were both created with identical specifications, but Casshern was slightly ahead of him in reaching Luna. Dio refuses to receive Luna's "salvation" as he discovers his real desire is to defeat Casshern. Unable to deny him, Casshern fights Dio until the latter "wins" (striking him with a blow that would kill him if he could not regenerate). Satisfied by reaching his goal and knowing his time is almost up, Dio wanders off to wait for death by the ruin, but not before asking Casshern to save Leda for him. Later, his body is found by Leda who dies next to him.

Leda (レダ, Reda)
Voiced by: Mami Koyama (Japanese); Shelley Calene-Black (English)

A female robot created alongside Casshern and Dio, she assists Dio in restoring the robot army, and states that she is affectionate toward him. She intervenes and helps Dio retreat, whenever he begins to step over the boundaries of his well being. Aggressively seeking Luna, she reveals that she, not Dio, is the one with ambition. When she finds Luna, however, the blood she takes deforms her. She tries to take revenge on Luna, but when Casshern appears and reveals Dio's last request to save her, she goes to look for him. Finally she finds Dio's body in the wasteland, where she succumbs to the ruin herself deciding to die next to him with a smile on her face.

Dune (ドゥーン, Dūn)
Voiced by: Yuto Nakano (Japanese); Jason Douglas (English)

A heavily deteriorated robot in tattered cloth. He is a powerful robot formerly assigned as Luna's bodyguard labelled the "God of Death". Unable to stop Casshern from killing Luna, he wanders the wasteland solely to find her and seek revenge on Casshern, despite his severe debilitation. After Luna returns, Dune once again resumes his duty as her bodyguard. He is mortally wounded defending against a large force of robots who seek Luna's death; he dies with Casshern, Lyuze, and Ringo by his side.

Sophita (ソフィータ, Sofīta)
Voiced by: Tomoko Akiya (Japanese); Carrie Savage (English)

A humanoid robot girl who only appears in episode 4 that believed fighting was the only way to feel alive, until she met Casshern. Known as the Angel of Ruin, Sophita only wishes to fight and slay her enemies, as it gives her a burning passion in her heart that she adores. She has no real emotions besides her drive to fight and kill. She expresses her love to fight by bringing early ruin to her victims, but she is not quite evil as she is lost and twisted by the ruined planet. Her life revolves around fighting and it is the only thing she cares about, until Casshern, everyone whom she had met she wished to fight to the death with, normally coming out on top with no remorse for the other. Sophita regularly refers to herself in the third person and is a very tall girl with large, spiky pink hair, dark skin and forest green eyes. She wears a gold, sleeveless, open shirt with a matching skirt and a tan undershirt matching with her necklace. After her sole appearance in the fourth episode, she is neither seen or referred to again for the rest of the series.

== Media ==
=== Manga ===
A manga adaptation was announced in the September 26, 2008, issue of Jive's Comic Rush Magazine. It began serialization in the December issue, which was published on October 25, 2008.

=== Anime ===
Casshern Sins was first announced at the Tokyo International Anime Fair 2008, where it was confirmed that Madhouse would be in charge of the animation. It aired from October 1, 2008, to March 15, 2009. Soon after, an official trailer was posted online on its official Japanese website. It was announced at Otakon 2009 that Funimation Entertainment would produce and distribute the series for release in 2010, following a subtitled-only release on their video service in late 2009. Casshern Sins is distributed in Oceania by Siren Entertainment with an Australian distribution by Gryphon Entertainment, and New Zealand distribution is by Vendetta Films. Manga Entertainment distributes Casshern Sins in the United Kingdom. The series made its North American television debut on December 14, 2010, on Funimation Channel. Adult Swim aired the series as part of the newly revived Toonami programming block from May 27 until November 4, 2012.

The show had previously aired on Japan's Chiba TV, TV Aichi, MBS, TV Kanagawa & TV Saitama stations. Casshern Sins had also aired on Singapore's Arts Central channel. According to The Straits Times, the show aired simultaneously with Japan in order to cut down on illegal downloading in Singapore. TV5 airs Casshern Sins in the Philippines.

== Reception ==
Theron Martin of Anime News Network praised the series and gave it an overall ranking of "B+", commending the show's style and excellent sound design, while detracting that the show's "overstretched plot" and grim tone. Another contributor from the same website, Mark Sombillo gave the series a review, writing that "Let's go through what was good. The soundtrack is fantastic. The word "epic" is far too often thrown around today with total disregard to its real meaning and applicability but I'm left with not many other words in order to describe the background music. Essentially it's the kind of orchestral performance that would be at home in a movie about the gods of Mt. Olympus fighting it out with the Titans. The ending credits song is also a first in a while that has struck a chord in me. K∧N∧'s soulful singing perhaps doing more to remind me of how lonely Casshern's world is turning into rather than the story itself. Character design also has a bit of nostalgic feel to it, a light nod to the original series and the era it was re-envisioned from; you can be forgiven for thinking you were watching Battle of the Planets all over again. The fight sequences are also cumbersome to watch where you're more likely to just see swipes of light to represent that an action has occurred before it skips to the scene where the bad guy is falling apart. And just back to the background music, or rather the bits where it doesn't play, there were just too many elongated silent moments often accompanied by cheap zoom-in shots of the characters with nothing happening".

== See also ==
- Casshan – The original 1973 TV series.
- Casshan: Robot Hunter – A four-episode OVA produced in 1993.
- Casshern – A 2004 live-action tokusatsu film adaptation.
