= Straight to Hell (TV series) =

2026 Japanese television series

- Japanese: 地獄に堕ちるわよ
- Literal meaning: You're going to hell
Transcriptions
- Romanization: Jigoku ni ochiru wa yo
- Genre: Biographical drama; Period drama
- Based on: Life of Kazuko Hosoki
- Written by: Monaka Manaka
- Directed by: Tomoyuki Takimoto; Norichika Oba
- Starring: Erika Toda; Sairi Ito; Toko Miura; Tetta Sugimoto; Yasuko Tomita; Toma Ikuta
- Composer: Hibiki Inamoto
- Country of origin: Japan
- Original language: Japanese
- No. of seasons: 1
- No. of episodes: 9

Production
- Executive producer: Makiko Okano (Netflix)
- Producers: Tatsuya Banno; Tomoo Fukatsu; Koji Harada
- Cinematography: Taro Kawazu
- Editors: Masaya Okazaki; Nobuyuki Takahashi
- Running time: 46-65 min
- Production company: Django Film

Original release
- Network: Netflix
- Release: April 27, 2026

Straight to Hell (Japanese: 地獄に堕ちるわよ, Hepburn: Jigoku ni ochiru wa yo) is a 2026 Japanese biographical period drama television series released on Netflix. The series stars Erika Toda as Japanese fortune teller and television personality Kazuko Hosoki, with Sairi Ito as a novelist interviewing her about her life.

== Premise ==
The series follows Kazuko Hosoki's rise from postwar Japan to becoming one of the country's most famous and controversial fortune tellers during the Showa and Heisei eras

== Cast ==
=== Main ===
- Erika Toda as Kazuko Hosoki, a woman who rises from poverty in postwar Japan to become a Ginza club owner and later a nationally famous fortune teller.
- Sairi Ito as Minori Uozumi, a young novelist and single mother hired to write a book about Kazuko's life.

=== People in Kazuko's life ===
- Toma Ikuta as Masaya Hotta, a yakuza figure who becomes Kazuko's lover and business partner.
- Tetta Sugimoto as Sojiro Takiguchi, an underworld figure who exploits Kazuko after her financial downfall.
- Eita Okuno as Hajime Ochiai (episode 1), a bar owner who hires Kazuko as a hostess.
- Kentaro Tamura as Marohiko Mita (episodes 2–3), Kazuko's husband from a wealthy traditional family.
- Ayumu Nakajima as Yutaka Sudo (episodes 3–4), a real estate agent who becomes romantically involved with Kazuko.
- Renji Ishibashi as Masataka Yasunaga (episodes 8–9), a respected scholar of Yangmingism who later becomes connected to Kazuko.

=== Kazuko's family ===
- Yasuko Tomita as Mine Hosoki, Kazuko's mother.
- Gaku Hosokawa as Hisao Hosoki, Kazuko's younger brother and later business associate.
- Erika Shumoto as Akiko Hosoki, Kazuko's sister.
- Miho Kanazawa as Sachiko Hosoki, Kazuko's sister.

=== Business associates ===
- Kazuya Takahashi as Eiichi Nakazono, Kazuko's wealthy backer and business supporter.
- Mio Tanaka as Yazawa, a director at TV station.

=== Other characters ===
- Toko Miura as Chiyoko Shimakura, a singer whose career becomes connected to Kazuko and Hotta.
- Yuko Nakamura as Mirei Sei, a fortune teller who influences Kazuko's later career.
- Shingo Mizusawa as a street vendor (episode 1).
- Hiccorohee as Mai (episode 1).
- Kimiko Yo as Kiyo Mita (episodes 2–3), Marohiko's mother and the head of the Mita household.
- Miwako Ichikawa as Towako Kato (episodes 8–9), Masataka Yasunaga's daughter.
- Show Kasamatsu as Osamu Miyazawa, Minori Uozumi's ex-husband (episode 8).
- Kaho Tsuchimura as a mistress (episodes 8–9).
- Toshie Negishi as Minori Uozumi's mother.
- Nagomu Miyamoto as Nobu Murao.
- Razor Ramon HG as himself

== Episodes ==
Straight to Hell was released on Netflix on April 27, 2026, and consists of nine episodes.

No.	Title	Original release date
1	"Episode 1"	April 27, 2026
In 2005, Kazuko Hosoki is a wealthy and famous Japanese fortune teller known for her blunt television persona. She hires a young novelist, Minori, to write a book about her life. After a tense live interview ends with the interviewer quitting on air, Kazuko begins recounting her past. In 1946, shortly after the war, young Kazuko lives with her mother and three siblings in poverty. When her mother is deceived and left in debt, Kazuko develops a harsh belief that people who are tricked are responsible for their own misfortune. Years later, as Japan rebuilds, her family runs a small oden shop, but continues to struggle financially. Still in high school, Kazuko begins working as a hostess at a bar owned by Ochiai. Initially unable to attract customers, she learns to approach wealthy men outside work and bring them to the club, quickly becoming its top earner. Her success makes the other hostesses resentful. Ochiai exploits the situation, begins a relationship with Kazuko, and attempts to force her into prostitution for clients, revealing it as his usual method. Furious, Kazuko humiliates him and leaves the bar, choosing to control her own future alone, rather than be used by others again.
2	"Episode 2"	April 27, 2026
After a suicide attempt following her experience with Ochiai, Kazuko receives support from Nakazono, a wealthy regular customer at her family’s oden shop. In the present, Minori is shown as a divorced single mother struggling financially while raising her daughter and working part-time at night. Kazuko resumes her account of the past. With Nakazono’s help, she and her sister successfully operate a small takeaway snack shop, which eventually allows Kazuko to open a modest hostess bar in Shinbashi. Her forceful and self-centered management style causes conflict with her sister and mother, but Nakazono recognizes her business talent and later finances a high-class hostess club in Ginza. The club becomes an immediate success, attracting elite clients from Japan’s wealthy and political circles, and Kazuko gains a reputation as the “Queen of Ginza”. Her mother remains uneasy, especially after a fortune teller warns that Kazuko will be consumed by her own greed. Kazuko later meets Mita, a young office worker from a wealthy conservative family. Mita falls in love with her and proposes marriage as he prepares for family succession. Although Kazuko remains uncertain, her mother welcomes the marriage as a chance for stability, respectability, and social advancement in postwar Japan society.
3	"Episode 3"	April 27, 2026
Mita's family is revealed to be highly traditional and controlled by his mother, Kiyo, the household's de facto head. Although Masahiko initially treats Kazuko kindly and suggests she may help manage the family estate, Kiyo denies her any real authority. The servants also look down on Kazuko, whispering that the family only expects her to produce an heir. Kazuko realizes that she is viewed as a gold digger and valued less as Masahiko's partner than as a broodmare. The family's chickens, prized because their fresh eggs symbolize household prosperity, receive more care than she does. Enraged by the humiliation, Kazuko kills the chickens, serves them to the family, and leaves permanently. Returning to Tokyo, she finds her Ginza club increasingly successful and attracting yakuza attention. She convinces Nakazono to finance two additional Ginza clubs, both of which succeed. In the present, Minori compares her own struggles with Kazuko's independence and rejects help from her ex-husband. Kazuko continues by recalling Yutaka Sudo, a young real estate agent who becomes a regular customer. After initially ignoring her, he asks to borrow 500,000 yen for a risky development project, and their mutual attraction begins to surface within her expanding but dangerous Ginza world.
4	"Episode 4"	April 27, 2026
Sudo repays Kazuko with interest and offers to help her whenever needed. At her request, he finds her a luxurious house and admits that his real estate work is tied to racketeering, but promises to cut those connections to win her trust. Kazuko falls in love with him, and Sudo later proposes opening an extravagant cabaret club called Enka, a 200-million-yen project requiring her to invest half. When he demands that she sever ties with Nakazono out of jealousy, Nakazono warns her against trusting him, but Kazuko angrily ends their partnership. She mortgages her Ginza clubs to raise 100 million yen, and Enka initially opens with success. However, Sudo soon disappears after withdrawing the club's cash and leaving numerous contractors, electricians, designers, and stage workers unpaid. As debt collectors harass Kazuko's family, her mother, Mine, dies of heart failure, and her relatives blame Kazuko for the disaster. Overwhelmed, Kazuko attempts suicide, but Takiguchi, a yakuza figure, intervenes and reveals that Sudo was working for him all along. He coerces Kazuko into his control, subjects her to sexual violence, and forces her into a new dependence that destroys her remaining belief in love, safety, independence, and trust for years after her downfall completely thereafter.
5	"Episode 5"	April 27, 2026
In the present, Kazuko holds an expensive seminar for clients who pay large fees for her advice. During the event, she aggressively sells additional household items, leading Minori to question the almost cult-like atmosphere surrounding her business. Kazuko later takes Minori to a male host bar for an extravagant night out, but Minori continues the interview the next morning while neglecting calls from her mother about her daughter. In the past, after the Tokyo Olympics, Takiguchi continues exploiting Kazuko, who remains trapped in debt and depression. At the same time, the yakuza begin investigating Takiguchi for violating their rules by selling drugs. In the present, Minori notices a photograph of Kazuko with Hotta, prompting Kazuko to explain their relationship. Hotta, another yakuza figure, becomes a regular at Enka and challenges Takiguchi to a gambling duel. Takiguchi angrily accepts and loses a large fortune, forcing him to give up Enka as collateral. Hotta returns the club to Kazuko and tells her Takiguchi has been expelled from Tokyo's underworld. Moved by his actions, Kazuko visits Hotta at his home, where they confess their feelings and begin a relationship.
6	"Episode 6"	April 27, 2026
In the present, Minori grows increasingly admiring of Kazuko and tries to spend more time with her daughter, until she discovers archival material about the Chiyoko Shimakura incident. In 1973, the oil crisis hits Japan, forcing the government to ration electricity and causing the economy to stagnate. Kazuko and Hotta's business struggles, and the pressure strains their relationship. After a fortune teller tells Kazuko that her luck will continue if she works hard, Kazuko takes the prediction seriously and redesigns her club as a modern disco, helping the business recover. While she and Hotta are spending time together, Takiguchi shoots Hotta in revenge. Hotta survives, which Kazuko interprets as another sign of the fortune teller's prediction. The couple unofficially marry and take their only photograph together. In the present, Minori asks Kazuko about Shimakura, and Kazuko gives her version of the story. She says she met Shimakura shortly before the singer attempted suicide, calling it fate. Like Kazuko, Shimakura had been deceived by her boyfriend and left with large debts. Kazuko and Hotta become her managers, marking the beginning of their legendary success with her and deepening Minori's doubts about how much of the account is personal truth or myth.
7	"Episode 7"	April 27, 2026
Kazuko tells Minori that she and Hotta paid Shimakura's debts with their own money and managed her finances, allowing the singer to revive her career quickly. She describes their relationship as sister-like. While Kazuko is away on vacation, Minori independently fact-checks the story and interviews people formerly connected to her. Hisao, Kazuko's younger brother and former close business associate, describes Kazuko as ruthless and skilled at using others. He claims Kazuko's version of the Shimakura incident is false. According to him, Shimakura originally contacted Hotta to deal with debt collectors, which Kazuko turned into a business opportunity. Rather than paying the full debt, Kazuko and Hotta used yakuza intimidation to settle only part of it. Their relationship was already deteriorating, held together mainly by money. They then exploited Shimakura's renewed popularity, forcing her into hundreds of performances while paying her only a small allowance, despite her large earnings. Kazuko even lived in Shimakura's apartment. After discovering the arrangement, Shimakura fights with Kazuko, who throws her out of her own home. Shimakura later sleeps with Hotta in revenge, contributing to his break with Kazuko. In the present, Shimakura indirectly confirms the story, but says Kazuko still saved her from hell.
8	"Episode 8"	April 27, 2026
In the present, Minori continues avoiding Kazuko and investigates her past through other sources. She meets Towako Kato, the daughter of Masataka Yasunaga, a respected scholar of Yangmingism admired by Japan's elite. In the past, after breaking up with Hotta, Kazuko retreats to the mountains and encounters a woman involved in an affair. Repeating the fortune-telling advice she once received, Kazuko convinces the woman to change her life and receives a diamond ring in gratitude. She returns to the same fortune teller for guidance and decides to become a fortune teller herself. Although the profession normally requires decades of study, Kazuko achieves success within a few years and becomes increasingly famous. She later becomes a disciple of Yasunaga, who is showing signs of dementia and resents the strict lifestyle imposed by Towako's care. Kazuko exploits his weakness, manipulates him into marrying her, and worsens his health by encouraging smoking and drinking. Towako responds by launching a public media battle against Kazuko. However, the scandal strengthens Kazuko's public image as Yasunaga's wife and disciple. In the present, Minori's ex-husband warns her that Kazuko is using her to protect her reputation from upcoming negative press.
9	"Last Episode"	April 27, 2026
After Yasunaga's death, Kazuko becomes nationally famous and uses television as her main platform. In the present, Minori meets the fortune teller who once advised Kazuko, but the woman dismisses Kazuko as anything but a true fortune teller and expresses resentment toward her. Yanagi, Hotta's former right-hand man, confirms that Hotta died while under Kazuko's care despite their breakup years earlier, and warns Minori not to interfere, implying that he still works for Kazuko. Pressured by her publisher and Kazuko, Minori finally meets Kazuko again and promises to complete the book through her own interpretation, which Kazuko accepts. Over several months, Minori writes while interviewing people connected to Kazuko. Her fans remain devoted, while many television colleagues resent her and regard her as a passing celebrity and fraud. In 2006, Minori finishes the manuscript and lets Kazuko read it first. Kazuko is moved and praises Minori's interpretation, but refuses publication, fearing damage to her reputation. After arguing over the book's purpose, Minori gives up and leaves, though Kazuko keeps the draft. The story ends as Kazuko, searching for her missing dog Tiara, confronts a vision of her younger self, who tells her she will go straight to hell at last.

== Production ==
Netflix announced the series as a 2026 release, with Erika Toda starring as Kazuko Hosoki.

== Release ==
Straight to Hell premiered worldwide on Netflix on April 27, 2026 with all nine episodes.

== Reception ==
The Japan Times discussed the series in relation to Kazuko Hosoki's public image and the dramatization of her life.

Decider reviewed the series and discussed its portrayal of Kazuko Hosoki, Erika Toda's performance, and the show's slow-burn opening.

But Why Tho? described the series as a rags-to-riches drama and highlighted its focus on postwar Japan, ambition, and public image.
