= Aoi Shiro =

2008 video game

- Developer: Success Corporation
- Designer: Hal
- Platforms: PlayStation 2, Microsoft Windows, Nintendo Switch
- Release: PlayStation 2: JP: April 5, 2008; Microsoft Windows: JP: November 21, 2008; HD Remastered: WW: May 24, 2023
- Genres: Visual novel, adventure, horror, yuri
- Mode: Single-player

Aoi Shiro (アオイシロ; 'Blue Castle') is a Japanese horror adventure game by Japanese developer and publisher Success Corporation, released for the PlayStation 2 in Japan on April 5, 2008, and was later ported to Microsoft Windows with extra content. A reduced price "popular edition", included in the SuperLite 2000 Series, was released on April 28, 2009.

A remastered "HD" version for the Nintendo Switch and PC, alongside its older "sister-game" Akai Ito, was released on May 24, 2023. It has English language option and was released outside Japan.

== Plot ==
Aoi Shiro is an adventure game that sets stage in both the modern real world and a mythical world. The game takes place in the same universe as its predecessor, Akai Ito.

The Seijou Girls Academy's Kendo Club is traveling to Shoushinji for summer training camp. Near there is an island, Urashima, where a demon extermination took place long ago. They arrive around the time of a festival which honors a god that is worshipped by the people of Urashima, it celebrates the onitaiji and ensure another year of health for the people. Around the time of the festival, the weather around Urashima worsens and storms will come.

A few days into their training Osanai Syouko finds a girl washed up on the shores near the location of the training camp who can not speak and doesn't seem to know much about herself. Aoi Shiro's story varies greatly based upon the player's decisions, which not only affect the flow of the story but also the ending the player receives, several of which suggest romantic feelings among the female characters.

== Characters ==
Osanai Syouko (小山内 梢子)
Voiced by: Noriko Hidaka
Osanai is the main character of this game and a 2nd year student at Seijou Academy. Her nickname is "Osa". She is the well-liked, ace of the kendo team who takes on the role of captain after the former 3rd year captain retires. Since she is the serious and hardworking type, she often gets teased and is on the receiving end of jokes.
Aizawa Yasumi (相沢 保美)
Voiced by: Yamaguchi Rikako
A first year student at Seijou Academy, Yasumi is delicate girl who is the manager of the kendo team. Although she does not have any particular illness, she has much less stamina than normal people, so she finds it difficult to partake in any strenuous exercise. On the other hand, she is extremely determined and diligent about her job as a manager, and she does her best to contribute to the team's success. Momoko and a few others refer to her endearingly as "Zawacchi" which comes from "zawa" in her last name, Aizawa. She has a crush on Syouko which Momoko often makes fun of.
Nami (ナミ)
Voiced by: Rina Satō
Nami is a young girl who washes up on the shores near the location of the training camp. She looks to be about 10 to 12 years old, but her name and age are all unknown. When she wakes up from after being rescued by Yasumi and Syouko, she is found being unable to speak. Despite this, she makes up for her inability to communicate verbally with animated facial expressions, giving her a cute, childlike appearance. She becomes particularly attached to Syouko and Yasumi.
Kaya (カヤ)
Voiced by: Kaori Shimizu
Former kendo team captain at Seijou Academy and the cousin of Syouko's mother.
Kyan Migiwa (喜屋武 汀)
Voiced by: Ayumi Fujimura
Kyan is a young girl with a light, carefree personality who stays over at Shoushinji, the location of the training camp. She arrives there earlier than Syouko and the others. At first glance, Syouko is captivated by Migiwa's beauty and fashionable clothing, but once Migiwa shows her arrogance, Syouko quickly disbands that thought and categorizes Migiwa as one of those 'hard-to-deal-with' girls.
Kohaku (コハク)
Voiced by: Mizusawa Kei
Kohaku is a person of many mysteries and of a dignified presence. Kohaku's left eye is constantly closed.
Akita Momoko (秋田 百子)
Voiced by: Ookubo Aiko
Friend and roommate of Yasumi, Momoko is an energetic girl who likes to play pranks. Although she only begins kendo in high school, she shows great potential, despite having only trained for less than half a year. Because of her high, natural athletic ability, strong determination, and willpower, many already peg her as the next ace of kendo.
Sakurai Ayashiro (桜井 綾代)
Voiced by: Yoshinari Yuki
Ayashiro is very kind and comes from a wealthy family that have sheltered her in her upbringing. The former kendo team captain gave her the nickname of Hime.

== Development and release ==
Success first announced the production of a new visual novel in August 2006, two years after the release of its previous visual novel Akai Ito. The game was first released for the PlayStation 2 on April 5, 2008, and later for Microsoft Windows on November 21. Aoi Shiro for Windows was the number two top seller in its first week of release in Japanese PC game sales. A reduced price "popular edition", included in developer and publisher Success' SuperLite 2000 Series, was released on April 28, 2009, for PlayStation 2.

== Other media ==
Aoi Shiro has had two manga adaptations. Aoishiro - Waltz of the Blue Castle (アオイシロ-青い城の円舞曲) was written by Fumotogawa Tomoyuki and illustrated by Edoya Pochi. It was first serialized in Comic Yuri Hime in 2008 and later released into one bound volume. The story takes place before the start of the game and focuses on the relationship between Momoko and Yasumi when they first become roommates at Seijou Girls Academy dormitory. A second manga, titled Aoishiro - Kaeishou (アオイシロ -花影抄), was serialized in Comic Rush and was also written by Fumotogawa Tomoyuki and illustrated by Katase Yu. Three bound volumes were released in Japan between January 7 and October 6, 2008, published by Jive. This adaptation follows the video game storyline focusing on Nami's route.

A free Aoi Shiro web novel was released on the game's official website, and follows one of the storylines accessible when playing Yasumi route in the video game. The novel has been unofficially translated into English as of 2008.

An Internet radio show that was used to promote the video game was broadcast from March 1 to October 12, 2008, on Galge Radio Station. The show, which aired bi-weekly, was hosted by Yamaguchi Rikako and Ookubo Aiko, who voiced Yasumi and Momoko in the game, respectively.
