= Tona-Gura! =

Japanese manga and anime series

- (Right to Left) Top Row: Hatsune, Nina; Middle Row: Chihaya and Marie; Bottom Row: Yuuji, Kazuki

となグラ!
- Genre: Romantic comedy
- Manga
- Written by: Hidetaka Kakei
- Published by: Jive
- Magazine: Comic Rush
- Original run: January 2004 – July 2011
- Volumes: 13
- Anime television series
- Directed by: Tatsuya Abe
- Written by: Tatsuya Abe
- Music by: Tomoki Kikuya
- Studio: Daume
- Licensed by: NA: Discotek Media
- Original network: tvk, CTC, TVS, Sun TV, Tokyo MX, TV Aichi, Kids Station, KBS Kyoto
- Original run: July 8, 2006 – September 30, 2006
- Episodes: 13

Tona-Gura! (となグラ!) (Note: The name of the series is an abbreviation of となり暮らし、 グラフティ ("Living next door, graffiti").) is a Japanese romantic comedy manga written and illustrated by Hidetaka Kakei. It is centered on four childhood friends and the romantic relationship between two of them. It was serialized in Comic Rush from 2004 to 2011. An anime television series adaptation was broadcast in 2006.

== Plot ==
Kazuki Arisaka is excited that her childhood crush and next-door neighbor Yuji Kagura and his family are moving back after being away for ten years. However, her dreams of confessing her love for Yuji are shattered, when Yuji turns out to be a huge pervert. With the Arisaka and Kagura parents away overseas, they must deal with living together. Kazuki eventually realizes that Yuji has not really changed that much, but that she had ignored his behavior back then.

== Characters ==
Kazuki Arisaka (有坂香月, Arisaka Kazuki)
Voiced by: Akemi Kanda

A teenage girl who was fond of Yuji Kagura when they were kids, but her idealized image is shattered when she reunites with him and discovers he has become an obnoxiously lewd and perverted boy. She struggles to deal with her conflicted feelings for him over the course of the series. Her activities include being a member of the school's swimming club. She sometimes cooks, but adds ingredients that turn innocuous food into culinary disasters. Eventually she realizes that she still likes him despite his faults.

Yuji Kagura (神楽勇治, Kagura Yūji)
Voiced by: Hiroyuki Yoshino

Kazuki's next-door neighbor who returns at the beginning of the story. He was once a sweet innocent boy whom Kazuki fell in love with ten years ago, but is revealed to be an annoying openly lecherous guy. He regularly finds himself in situations where Kazuki is half-dressed, constantly has lewd fantasies, and sometimes ends up touching girls inappropriately. He is consequently punished by his sister and by Kazuki. Despite this, he exhibits a kind side that makes Kazuki wonder if he is a nice guy after all. It is revealed that he has been like that even as a kid, although Kazuki does not remember that part. It is suggested that he is in love with Kazuki, having directed most of his perverted actions towards her. Later in the story, he aspires to become a professional photographer and works as an intern.

Marie Kagura (神楽まりえ, Kagura Marie)
Voiced by: Erino Hazuki

Yuuji's younger sister. Kazuki described her as being a crybaby when she was younger. Now that she has grown up she isn't quite the crybaby she used to be. Now she can be found pelting her older brother with air guns hidden in her teddy bear and her other puppets when her brother is acting vulgar. Though she shoots him without a moments hesitation, she does greatly care for her older brother and gets lonely without him suggesting she might have a brother complex, with stronger hints later as she becomes jealous of Yuuji's and Kazuki's growing relationship. Marie is mortally afraid of cats and insects. She is able to flee bugs yet is nearly paralyzed by the presence of cats, though they are drawn to her.

Hatsune Arisaka (有坂初音, Arisaka Hatsune)
Voiced by: Sayaka Ohara

Kazuki's older sister, who is constantly trying to get Kazuki and Yūji together and inadvertently (and intentionally) puts them both into embarrassing and lascivious situations. There are some indications that she considers the mishaps (and the arguments following them) funny. Hatsune is good at everything she does, from cooking to sports. She is also considered extremely beautiful, sporting a very curvaceous figure and well-endowed breasts. She likes to tease her sister by showing her how infatuated Yuuji is with her breasts. Hatsune frequently engages in cosplay around the house and can, from time to time, be quite frightening to the people around her. Unlike her younger sister and Marie, Hatsune is perfectly unafraid of insects - or anything else. Although it's implied that Hatsune's true weakness is worrying about her sister's health. When Kazuki fell ill with a cold, Hatsune became comically uncoordinated and unskillful every time she heard Kazuki sneeze. She delights in making her sister think that her affections may be more than sisterly, and in aiding Yuuji, even when he goes too far.

Chihaya Suzuhara (鈴原ちはや, Suzuhara Chihaya)
Voiced by: Misaki Sekiyama

Kazuki's friend who apparently likes to spy on people. She speaks with a Kansai dialect and is much more receptive to Yuuji's bawdy nature than Kazuki, claiming 'all boys are like that'. She also doesn't object to being the object of his attention and even goes so far as to give minor underwear displays. At one point she tells Kazuki if she didn't want Yūji, she would take him instead. She is just joking but it causes Kazuki to get depressed, especially seeing how well the two got along. Chihaya tells Kazuki that she was going to tell her that she wasn't interested in Yūji but that it would be a lie and encourages her to make up with Yūji before he was stolen away.

Nīna Isokawa (磯川ニーナ, Isokawa Niina)
Voiced by: Ayumi Tsuji

Nīna is a blond-haired girl who goes to the same class as Marie. She has an American mother, a Japanese father, and a great deal of energy. She's very busty for her young age and is physically very active and extremely friendly, quickly attaching herself to Marie to the latter's initial displeasure. In the manga she has a crush on Yuji (who is torn between her being underage and her ample bust) and often refers to him as onii-chan.

Kōsuke Machida (町田洸介, Machida Kōsuke)
Voiced by: Shinji Kawada

President of Yūji's class.

Miu Serizawa (芹沢美宇, Serizawa Miu)
Voiced by: Shizuka Itō

Vice-president of Yūji's class. She uses any and all excuses to hit the class president. Even go so low as to hit him between the legs.

== Media ==
=== Manga ===
1. December 13, 2004 — ISBN 978-4-86176-054-9
2. June 13, 2005 — ISBN 978-4-86176-159-1
3. January 15, 2006 — ISBN 978-4-86176-266-6
4. July 15, 2006 — ISBN 978-4-86176-311-3
5. January 15, 2007 — ISBN 978-4-86176-364-9
6. September 15, 2007 — ISBN 978-4-86176-429-5
7. March 15, 2008 — ISBN 978-4-86176-498-1
8. October 13, 2008 — ISBN 978-4-86176-574-2
9. June 14, 2009 — ISBN 978-4-86176-673-2
10. December 13, 2009 — ISBN 978-4-86176-739-5
11. July 15, 2010 — ISBN 978-4-86176-776-0
12. December 13, 2010 — ISBN 978-4-86176-806-4
13. July 15, 2011 — ISBN 978-4-86176-853-8

=== Anime ===
==== Episode list ====
No.	Title	Original release date
1	"A 30 cm Unrequited Love" "30senchi no kataomoi" (30センチの片思い)	July 8, 2006
Kazuki is looking forward to the return of her old friends and neighbours, only to be shocked and dismayed when she sees what they've become in the years since they were last together.
2	"Aloof Kazuki And The Apron Of Temptation" "Tsuntsun Kazuki to Yūwaku epuron" (ツンツン香月と誘惑エプロン)	July 15, 2006
With the parents of both households stuck on a South American island for an indeterminate time, they ask their children to take care of each other. Kazuki refuses to admit the dirty-minded Yuuji into the home, unless he manages to spend the whole day without doing anything indecent, so they have a competition.
3	"Smart Yuuji And Startled Kazuki" "Kiritto Yūji ni dokkiri Kazuki" (キリッと勇治にドッキリ香月)	July 22, 2006
It's the first day at Kazuki's school for both Yuuji and Marie. While Marie is stuck in the same class with the hyperactive and overly friendly Nina, Yuuji manages to gain quite a crowd of girls by putting on his handsome face. Kazuki becomes jealous and sad when she sees Yuuji's popularity, leaving him at school when she goes home. To her surprise, this nets her a complaint from Yuuji, who wanted to walk home with her, not his adoring new classmates.
4	"Nya~" "Nya~" (にゃあ〜)	July 29, 2006
Nina, who considers Marie a good friend, pursues her relentlessly without realizing that this is causing the introverted Marie considerable distress. Only when Nina saves Marie from her worst fear and is set straight by Yuuji does she begin to understand Marie and lay the basis for a relationship that is not as one-sided.
5	"Let's Break Up!!" "Zekko surukara!!" (ゼッコーするからっ!!)	August 5, 2006
Kazuki experiences jealousy and insecurity when it turns out Chihaya and Yuuji share common interests and are becoming close friends. A visit by Chihaya to Kazuki's home turns sour when Yuuji holds a photo shoot and Kazuki feels like a fifth wheel, causing her to lash out in anger at both him and Chihaya, causing Yuuji to respond in kind and leaving their friendship apparently in shambles, to Chihaya's dismay.
6	"Hugging Princess?" "Ohimesama dakko?" (お姫様だっこ?)	August 12, 2006
After Kazuki's and Yuuji's break up they both feel depressed and Chihaya takes it upon herself get them back together.
7	"Strongest☆Invincible My Sister" "Saikyō☆Muteki mai sisutā" (最強☆無敵マイシスター)	August 19, 2006
After yet another pervert attack by Yuuji in the morning with some help by Hatsune, Marie decides she will find out Hatsune's weakness so that she will not be able to stop her from punishing her brother. But it seems that Hatsune doesn't have a weakness. Later, Kazuki finds out that Hatsune has a fever and collapsed. Kazuki thinks it is because she overworked herself in taking care of her and the household, so she decides to take care of Hatsune and the household so that her sister can get well and do what ever would make her happy.
8	"Kazuki x Hatsune Swimming Showdown" "Kazuki x Hatsune suiei taiketsu" (香月×初音水泳対決!)	August 26, 2006
Kazuki breaks her sister's record in swimming, which gets her a challenge from her sister for the upcoming swimming competition. Throughout the episode Hatsune attempts to discourage Kazuki by mentally inflicting damage to Kazuki, although Hatsune's reason for this is because she wants Kazuki to take this seriously. As the episode comes to close the question still remains, 'Who will win the serious race between the loving sisters?'.
9	"Maybe, Jealousy?" "Moshikashite, yakimochi?" (もしかして、ヤキモチ?)	September 2, 2006
Yuuji gets told that Kazuki was popular among guys in middle school and was proposed to by many, but refused all for an unknown love of hers. Yuuji thinks it's the new teacher, who she and Chihaya know, which causes him to start feeling jealous.
10	"It's A Bikini? Let's gather!" "BIKINI dayo? Zenin shugo" (ビキニだよ?全員集合)	September 9, 2006
The Teacher decides to take the group to the beach, where Kazuki uses a double standard to blame Yuuji for mistakes, when they could have easily been blamed on the teacher. Things between Yuuji and Kazuki worsen, as Kazuki keep putting Yuuji down and keeps comparing him with the teacher.
11	"Yukata, Fireworks and A Broken Sandal Strap" "Yukata to hanabi to kireta hanao" (浴衣と花火と切れた鼻緒)	September 16, 2006
The group goes to a festival, where another occurrence happens between Yuuji, Kazuki and the teacher. Is the calm after the storm coming soon or not?
12	"A Letter To Yuuji And Memories From Ten Years Ago" "Yūji e no tegami to jūnen mae no kioku" (勇治への手紙と十年前の記憶)	September 23, 2006
Yuuji stops his raunchy and perverted action towards all women. But doing this caused him to act depressed and tired, while Yuuji's friends try to figure out why he's doing this, Kazuki figures that it may be because of her that Yuuji became like this. Although originally Kazuki liked the 'old' Yuuji back, she remembers that the 'old' Yuuji is more similar to the present Yuuji. So Kazuki tries to remember what she wrote to Yuuji in the letter 10 years ago and finally comes to a conclusion.
13	"The Veranda and a Paper Plane" "VERANDA to kami hikōki" (ベランダと紙ひこーき)	September 30, 2006
Yuuji has to move again. After finding out what Yuuji was really like in the past - and what she herself was like back then - what will Kazuki do?

=== Theme songs ===
- Opening Theme: "DRAMATIC☆GIRLY" by Akemi Kanda, Sayaka Ohara, Erino Hazuki, Misaki Sekiyama & Ayumi Tsuji
- Ending Theme: "Aitai Kimochi Kara~Placid Time~" by Akemi Kanda and Sayaka Ohara (episode 1–12)
  - "Oh My Darling" by Akemi Kanda (episode 13)
