= Shigeru Matsuzaki =

- Born: Shigeyuki Matsuzaki; November 19, 1949 (age 76); Edogawa, Tokyo, Japan
- Other name: Shigeru Brown
- Education: Nihon University
- Occupations: Singer, actor
- Agent: Office Walker
- Musical career
- Genres: J-Pop
- Instruments: Vocals, guitar
- Years active: 1970–present
- Label: AG Label

Shigeyuki Matsuzaki (Japanese: 松崎 茂幸, Hepburn: Matsuzaki Shigeyuki; born November 19, 1949), known professionally as Shigeru Matsuzaki (松崎 しげる, Matsuzaki Shigeru) is a Japanese singer and actor. He is most known in the West for his contributions to the Katamari Damacy soundtracks, performing the theme songs of Nerima Daikon Brothers and acting as its lead character, and voicing the title character in the film adaptation of Space Adventure Cobra.

Matsuzaki is left-handed, as seen whenever he plays bass or guitar, his string instruments are usually tuned with the lower E string at the bottom. He has also collaborated with the popular music group Momoiro Clover Z.

Matsuzaki is also a baseball fan, having sung the theme song of the Saitama Seibu Lions of the NPB that began to be used when they moved to Tokorozawa in 1979. In an interview with Weekly Baseball, he said that he "loved drinking whiskey behind the net at the Seibu Dome."

In Thailand, his song Kimiga ireba sorede ii (君がいればそれでいい), which was used in a Glico almond commercial in 1987, was very well-known and many local singers covered it. However, this song is not well-known in Japan.

== Discography ==
- Yes or No (1991)
- Memories of Love (メモリーズ・オブ・ラブ, Memorīzu obu rabu) (1994)
- Eternal Love (エターナル・ラブ, Etānaru rabu) (2000)
- Old Fashion Love Song (2000)
- Ano hi no shōnen (あの日の少年) (2003)
- My Favorite Songs (2005)
- Yes We Can!! (2009)
- Shigeru Matsuzaki All Time Best "Old & New"～I'm a Singer～ (2011)
- Black on Black (2014)

== Selected filmography ==
- Space Adventure Cobra (1982)
- Ponytail wa Furimukanai (1985)
- Chōshichirō Edo Nikki (1987)
- Bikkuriman 2000 (1999)
- Cromartie High School (2005)
- Fugo Keiji (2005)
- Nerima Daikon Brothers (2006)
- Tokyo Girl (2008)
- Dead Sushi (2012)
