= Listen to Me, Girls. I Am Your Father! =

Japanese light novel series

- First light novel cover, featuring (from left to right) Sora, Miu, and Hina

パパのいうことを聞きなさい！ (Papa no Iu Koto o Kikinasai!)
- Genre: Romantic comedy
- Light novel
- Written by: Tomohiro Matsu
- Illustrated by: Yuka Nakajima
- Published by: Shueisha
- Imprint: Super Dash Bunko
- Original run: December 25, 2009 – March 25, 2015
- Volumes: 18 + 1 extra
Further information
Manga
Written by	Tomohiro Matsu
Illustrated by	Yohei Takemura
Published by	Shueisha
Magazine	Jump Square (2011–2012); Jump SQ.19 (2012)
Original run	August 4, 2011 – October 19, 2012
Volumes	3
Manga
Papa no Iukoto o Kikinasai: Takanashi no Hidamari
Written by	Izumi Kirihara; F4U; Ryu Shinonome; Wadapen; Keiji Watarai
Published by	Shueisha
Magazine	Ultra Jump
Original run	August 19, 2011 – January 19, 2012
Volumes	1
Manga
Papa no Iukoto o Kikinasai: Miu-sama no Iu Tōri!
Written by	Tomoo Katou
Published by	Shueisha
Magazine	Cookie
Original run	August 26, 2011 – February 25, 2012
Volumes	1
Manga
Papa no Iukoto o Kikinasai: Usagi no Mark
Written by	Matsuda98
Published by	Shueisha
Magazine	Cobalt
Original run	October 1, 2011 – February 1, 2012
Volumes	1
Manga
Papa no Iukoto o Kikinasai: Sora-iro no Hibiki
Written by	Tatsuma Ejiri
Published by	Shueisha
Magazine	Super Dash & Go
Original run	October 25, 2011 – December 25, 2012
Volumes	2
Manga
Papa no Iukoto o Kikinasai: Rojō Kansatsu Kenkyū Nisshi
Written by	Miyano Hirotsugu
Published by	Shueisha
Magazine	Weekly Young Jump
Original run	October 27, 2011 – October 11, 2012
Volumes	4
Anime television series
Directed by	Itsuro Kawasaki
Produced by	Shinya Shinozaki; Takahiro Yamanaka; Tomoko Kawasaki
Written by	Naruhisa Arakawa
Music by	Hiroshi Uesugi
Studio	Feel
Licensed by	NA: Sentai Filmworks
Original network	Tokyo MX, tvk, TVS, Chiba TV, MBS, TVA, BS11
English network	US: Anime Network
Original run	January 11, 2012 – March 27, 2012
Episodes	12 + 3 OVAs
Video game
Game Demo Papa no Iu Koto wo Kikinasai!
Developer	Tenky, Banpresto
Publisher	Bandai Namco Entertainment
Genre	Visual novel
Platform	PlayStation Portable
Released	April 26, 2012
- icon

Listen to Me, Girls. I Am Your Father! (Japanese: パパのいうことを聞きなさい!, Hepburn: Papa no Iukoto wo Kikinasai!; lit. 'Listen to What Papa Says!') is a Japanese light novel series written by Tomohiro Matsu and illustrated by Yuka Nakajima. It was published by Shueisha's Super Dash Bunko imprint, with 18 volumes released from December 2009 to March 2015. Following Matsu's death in May 2016, a posthumous volume, subtitled After 1, was released in July of that same year.

The series follows a mature college student who suddenly becomes the guardian of his three nieces in place of his sister and her husband. The couple went overseas on a business trip, but their plane went missing, and all passengers were presumed dead. To prevent the girls from being separated, he defies his family's wishes and takes them in, just as his sister did for him.

A manga adaptation, illustrated by Yohei Takemura, was serialized in Shueisha's shōnen manga magazines Jump Square (August 2011 – March 2012) and Jump SQ.19 (April – October 2012), with its chapters collected in three tankōbon volumes. Five spin-off manga were also released in 2011. A 12-episode anime television series adaptation by Feel was broadcast from January to March 2012, with three additional original video animation (OVA) episodes released. A video game by Bandai Namco Entertainment was released for the PlayStation Portable in April 2012.

== Plot ==
Yuuta Segawa is in his freshman year of college. He and his older sister Yuri were orphaned as children but when their relatives tried to separate and send them to live in different foster homes, Yuri chose to raise him on her own. Now, many years later, Yuri, who has since married, asks Yuuta to babysit her daughter, Hina, and two stepdaughters, Sora and Miu Takanashi, while she and her husband go on a trip. The plane Yuri and her husband are on crashes and they are both reported missing and presumed dead. In order to prevent the girls being separated from each other, Yuuta takes it upon himself to look after them in his small apartment. Thus begins Yuuta's story of sharing his everyday life with his three nieces.

== Characters ==
=== Main characters ===
Yuuta Segawa (瀬川 祐太, Segawa Yūta)
Voiced by: Wataru Hatano
Yuuta is a first-year literature student at Tama University who, after losing his parents in childhood, was raised by his older sister Yuri. When Yuri and her husband disappear, he becomes the guardian of their three daughters to prevent their separation by the Takanashi family. His dependable and caring demeanor earns him the sisters' trust, particularly Sora, who develops deep affection for him. Though drawn to Raika, a fellow university student and club member, he struggles to confess his feelings. Over time, the Takanashi family recognizes his dedication and grants him shared ownership of Yuri’s home in Ikebukuro, enabling him and the girls to relocate from his small apartment. Years later, Yuuta and Sora choose to marry.
Sora Takanashi (小鳥遊 空, Takanashi Sora)
Voiced by: Sumire Uesaka
Sora is the eldest of the three half-sisters, a 14-year-old middle school student with a tsundere personality. Recognizable by a distinctive crescent-shaped curl in her neck-length brown hair, she excels academically but struggles with cooking. She harbors deep feelings for Yuuta, initially calling him oji-san before affectionately switching to onii-chan despite their lack of blood relation. Passionate about singing, she joins the choir club in her first year of junior high. Though envious of Raika’s maturity and closeness with Yuuta, she remains devoted to him. Encouraged by Yuuta and her club president, Kiyomi Okae, she overcomes self-doubt and continues pursuing music, eventually leading the choir in high school. She later marries Yuuta.
Miu Takanashi (小鳥遊 美羽, Takanashi Miu)
Voiced by: Eri Kitamura
Miu is the second-eldest sister, a 10-year-old fifth grader with blonde hair inherited from her Russian mother. She calls Yuuta "Oji-san" and admires mature, masculine men, showing subtle interest in him by often questioning his romantic life. Though she once went on a date with Kouichi, she gradually develops deeper feelings for Yuuta, choosing to stay with him and her sisters when given the chance to leave. By the time she enters junior high, her bond with the family remains strong.
Hina Takanashi (小鳥遊 ひな, Takanashi Hina)
Voiced by: Hiromi Igarashi
Hina is the youngest sister, a cheerful three-year-old who attends daycare. As Yuri's biological daughter, she is Yuuta's only blood relative among the sisters. Outgoing and trusting, she affectionately calls him oi-tan due to her difficulty pronouncing oji-san. She adores the anime Luna Luna Seven and, when mentioning her missing parents, receives gentle support from Yuuta and her sisters until she accepts their absence. She eventually enters second grade and speaks more clearly.

=== Street Observation Research Society ===
Raika Oda (織田 莱香, Oda Raika)
Voiced by: Yui Horie
Raika is a second-year literature student at Tama University and the sole female member of the Street Observation Research Society. Reserved yet striking in appearance, she openly expresses herself only around Yuuta, often teasing him while concealing her emotions from others. Skilled in Japanese cuisine, she wields a paper fan to discipline Sako for his crude behavior. Despite her aloof demeanor, she has a marked fondness for cute things—including Yuuta's nieces—which softens her usual reticence. While Sora resents Raika's closeness with Yuuta, she unwittingly sees her as a maternal figure.
Kouichi Nimura (仁村 浩一, Nimura Kōichi)
Voiced by: Daisuke Ono
A first-year student of Tama University School of Literature. He is a good friend of Yuuta's and a womanizer. He insists that his house is only for entertaining girls. As a result, he almost never stays at his home and instead spends time at Yuuta's apartment, or at one of his affairs' places. He is however a very caring friend and will help out with chores on his own initiative. He also helps Yuuta keep Sako away from his nieces and has a soft spot for Miu.
Shuntarou Sako (佐古 俊太郎, Sako Shuntarō)
Voiced by: Junji Majima
A third-year student of the Tama University School of Literature. He is the President of the Street Observation Research Society. Sako has been a third-year in the university ever since Raika enrolled. He is a lolicon and wears thick glasses. He once told Raika that "Love is justice. Love is the strongest." to justify his lolicon fetishes to which Raika later agrees. Despite this she frequently beats him on with a paper fan when he goes overboard. He has taken a certain interest in Yuuta's nieces, excluding Sora, whom he claims she is too old for him despite being only 14, and usually calls her oba-chan (old lady). Sako actually proves himself to be a reliable friend.

=== Others ===
Yuri Takanashi (小鳥遊 祐理, Takanashi Yuri)
Voiced by: Sayaka Ohara
Yuri is Yuuta's older sister, stepmother to Miu and Sora, and biological mother to Hina. After their parents' death, she raised Yuuta alone to keep the family together, passing down "Twinkle, Twinkle, Little Star" as a cherished family song. She later married Shingo, despite Yuuta's initial anger upon learning Shingo had two children from a previous marriage. Yuuta ultimately accepted the marriage, realizing his sister's happiness mattered most. When Yuri and Shingo's plane disappears, Yuuta takes custody of their children to preserve their family bond. Their spirits are briefly seen supporting Sora and Yuuta.
Shingo Takanashi (小鳥遊 進悟, Takanashi Shingo)
Voiced by: Nobuo Tobita
Yuri's husband. He hails from a wealthy family and is a genuinely kind man. He was previously married twice and each time had one child. Sora's mother died and Miu's mother divorced him. He and Yuri met at an otaku convention: she was cosplaying (a habit she hid from Yuuta) and he was a photographer. Shingo kept a collection of photographs of Yuri and the girls cosplaying.
Kurumi Atarashi (新子 胡桃, Atarashi Kurumi)
Voiced by: Sakura Nakamura
Yuuta's next-door neighbor. She works as a voice actress and previously worked as a villain on Hina's favorite anime series. She plays with Hina and Miu during her spare time.
Sawako Midorikawa (緑川 佐和子, Midorikawa Sawako)
Voiced by: Rina Satō
The landlady is a strict and uncompromising figure who nearly evicts Yuuta and the girls from their apartment before her mother intervenes. A 29-year-old single woman, she displays visible irritation toward young couples but grows fond of Hina over time. The character appears exclusively in the anime adaptation and the Takanashi no Hidamari manga, while the light novels feature a different, unnamed male landlord with minimal involvement.
Shiori Kitahara (北原 栞, Kitahara Shiori)
Voiced by: Yuka Iguchi
Miu's friend and next-door neighbor of the Takanashi's Ikebukuro household. In the manga, she is protective of the sisters and is initially cold towards Yuuta, feeling he is not a worthy guardian. However, after seeing how reliable he actually is, she starts to develop feelings for him.
Yoshiko Sahara (佐原 よし子 (さはら よしこ))
Voiced by: Kyoko Hikami
Yuuta's paternal aunt. She initially allowed him to care for the Takanashi sisters as a pain reliever for the loss of Shingo and Yuri till they found a proper adult to raise all three, and does not see Yuuta as worthy guardian for his nieces. Deep down Yoshiko regretted not having courage to raise little Yuuta. She and Nobuyoshi at least get to witness her nephew improve as a young man and a father-figure, and has come to accept the siblings' closeness to each other.
Nobuyoshi Takanashi (小鳥遊 信好)
Voiced by: Bin Shimada
Shingo's paternal uncle. Unlike Yoshiko, Nobuyoshi is a much more competitor relative of the family; he carries Shingo's past relationships as his own failures. Nobuyoshi does not accept Yuuta as a legitimate guardian for the girls in any regard, but as of now he is okay with just short agreements. In Takanashi no Hidamari manga, Yoshiko persuades Nobuyoshi to see Yuuta and the elder sisters showing parental attendance at Hina's preschool, sensing the silhouettes of Yuri and Shingo, Nobuyoshi redeems and offers Yuuta the deed to the Takanashi's Ikebukuro house.
Sasha Irinichina Gagarina (サーシャ・イリイーニチナ・ガガーリナ)
Voiced by: Akemi Okamura
Sasha is Shingo's ex-wife and Miu's biological mother, a Russian fashion designer whose marriage to Shingo ended due to family difficulties. After leaving Miu in his care, she returned to Russia. Following Shingo and Yuri's disappearance, the Takanashi family prevents Miu from living with Sasha due to the language barrier. Sasha eventually reconciles with Miu and designs formal attire for Yuuta and Sora's wedding.

== Media ==
=== Light novels ===
Written by Tomohiro Matsu, with illustrations by Yuka Nakajima, the first Me, Girls. I Am Your Father! novel was released on December 25, 2009. The series finished with its eighteenth volume, released on March 25, 2015. In May 2016, it was announced that Matsu had died; on the same month, it was announced that a posthumous spin-off novel would be published. Subtitled After 1, it was released on July 22, 2016.

==== Volumes ====
No.	Release date	ISBN
1	December 25, 2009	978-4-08-630526-6
2	February 25, 2010	978-4-08-630533-4
3	May 25, 2010	978-4-08-630547-1
4	September 25, 2010	978-4-08-630569-3
5	November 25, 2010	978-4-08-630582-2
6	January 25, 2011	978-4-08-630588-4
7	May 25, 2011	978-4-08-630611-9
8	September 22, 2011	978-4-08-630635-5
9	January 25, 2012	978-4-08-630658-4
10	May 25, 2012	978-4-08-630678-2
11	October 25, 2012	978-4-08-630704-8
12	February 22, 2013	978-4-08-630719-2
13	June 25, 2013	978-4-08-630733-8
14	October 25, 2013	978-4-08-630756-7
15	February 25, 2014	978-4-08-630771-0
16	June 25, 2014	978-4-08-630787-1
17	January 23, 2015	978-4-08-630805-2
18	March 25, 2015	978-4-08-630807-6
After 1	July 22, 2016	978-4-08-630808-3

=== Manga ===
A manga adaptation, illustrated by Yohei Takemura, was serialized in Shueisha's shōnen manga magazine Jump Square from August 4, 2011, to March 4, 2012. It later moved to Jump SQ.19, where it ran from April 19 to October 19, 2012. (Note: Published from the first to fourth issues of the magazine, released on April 19 and October 19, 2012, respectively.) Shueisha collected its chapters in three tankōbon volumes, released from December 2, 2011, to December 4, 2012.

Five spin-off manga were published as well in different Shueisha manga magazines:

- Takanashi no Hidamari (小鳥遊の陽だまり; lit. 'The Sunshine of the Takanashi Family') by Izumi Kirihara, F4U, Ryu Shinonome, Wadapen, and Keiji Watarai

Serialized in Ultra Jump from August 19, 2011, to January 19, 2012. Its chapters were collected in a single tankōbon volume, released on February 17, 2012. It focuses on the people who encounter the Takanashi family.

- Miu-sama no Iu Tōri! (美羽様のいう通り!; lit. 'Miu-sama is Always Right!') by Tomo Katō

Serialized in Cookie from August 26, 2011, to February 25, 2012. Its chapters were collected in a single tankōbon volume, released on March 23, 2012. It focuses on Miu.

- Usagi no Mark (うさぎのまぁく, Usagi no Māku; lit. 'Mark of the Rabbit') by Matsuda98

Serialized in Cobalt from October 1, 2011, to February 1, 2012. Its chapters were collected in a single tankōbon volume, released on March 23, 2012. It focuses on Hina.

- Sorairo no Hibiki (空色の響き; lit. 'Sora Colored Echo') by Tatsuma Ejiri

Serialized in Super Dash & Go from October 25, 2011, to December 25, 2012. Its chapters were collected in a single tankōbon volume, released on February 19, 2013. It focuses on Sora.

- Rojō Kansatsu Kenkyū Nisshi (路上観察研究日誌; lit. 'Chronicles of Street Observation Research') by Hirotsugu Miyano

Serialized in Weekly Young Jump from October 27, 2011, to October 11, 2012. Its chapters were collected in four tankōbon, released from January 19, 2012, to January 19, 2015. It focuses on the Street Observation Research Society.

=== Anime ===
A 12-episode anime television series adaptation by Feel was broadcast on Tokyo MX, tvk, TVS, Chiba TV, MBS, TVA, and BS11 from January 11 to March 27, 2012. The opening theme is "Happy Girl" by Eri Kitamura, and the ending theme is "Coloring" by Yui Horie. A 13th episode was bundled with the series' regular and limited editions of fifth Blu-ray Disc, released on July 11, 2013. Another additional episode was bundled with the limited edition on the light novel's 13th volume, released on June 25, 2013. A third additional episode was bundled with the limited edition of the light novel's 18th and last volume, released on March 25, 2015.

The series was streamed by Crunchyroll. Sentai Filmworks licensed the series for home video release in North America, and released it on February 25, 2013.

=== Visual novel ===
A visual novel video game was developed by Tenky and Banpresto and published by Namco Bandai Games was released for PlayStation Portable on April 26, 2012.

== See also ==
- Chained Soldier, a manga series also illustrated by Yohei Takemura
