= Natsumi Mukai =

Japanese manga artist

Natsumi Mukai (Japanese: 迎 夏生, Hepburn: Mukai Natsumi) is a Japanese manga artist. She is the creator of the manga series +Anima and Nui!

== Works ==
=== +Anima ===
+Anima is a manga series based around four children with the powers to change into a certain animal to defend themselves. The four children, Cooro, Nana, Husky, and Senri, travel around the country of Astaria looking for other +Anima and a home. They encounter friends and enemies alike as they search for a place to call home.

=== Nui! ===
Nui! is about a girl named Kaya who has just celebrated her sixteenth birthday; on that day, she discovers that her stuffed animal Purple is alive and has been secretly protecting Kaya all her life.
