= Tomohiro Matsu =

Japanese novelist (1972–2016)

- Born: 13 October 1972; Fukuoka Prefecture, Japan
- Died: 2 May 2016 (aged 43); Japan
- Other names: Makoto Matsumoto
- Occupations: Novelist, author, scriptwriter
- Years active: 2008–2016

Tomohiro Matsu (松智洋; 13 October 1972 – 2 May 2016) was a Japanese light novelist, who also authored work in manga and anime. His real name was Takahiro Narimatsu (成松 孝洋). He was married.

== Life and career ==
Born in Fukuoka Prefecture, Matsu was well known as the author of the light novel series Mayoi Neko Overrun! (12 volumes published between 2008 and 2012) and Listen to Me, Girls. I Am Your Father! (18 volumes published between 2009 and 2015). Both of them were adapted into manga and anime series. His last novel series, Hatena Illusion, of which four volumes were released, remained unfinished.

Under the name "Makoto Matsumoto" (松本真), he wrote the manga series My Dearest Devil Princess (2004–2007), which was illustrated by Maika Netsu. Matsu also collaborated as a scriptwriter to the anime series Queen's Blade: The Exiled Virgin and as story concept cooperation for Ixion Saga DT. He was also involved at Comiket, being part of the event's Comic Market Preparatory Committee staff, appearing in various talk events, and also wrote for Comiket's 40th anniversary book.

Matsu died on May 2, 2016, from liver cancer. A memorial service was held on May 8, where special attention was made to acknowledge not only Matsu, but his work as well, including through artwork.

Matsu had completed the draft for his last work titled Märchen Mädchen, and it was published in 2017 with a story finalized by StoryWorks.
