= Misaki Sekiyama =

Japanese voice actress

Misaki Sekiyama 関山 美沙紀
- Born: February 22, 1981 (age 45); Hyogo Prefecture, Japan
- Occupation: Voice actress
- Years active: 2005-present

Misaki Sekiyama (関山美沙紀, Sekiyama Misaki; born February 22) is a Japanese voice actress affiliated with 81 Produce.

== Filmography ==
- Blue Drop: Tenshi-tachi no Gikyoku (TV) as Kangofu
- Chocotto Sister (Takeshi's mother)
- Elizabeth (ep 44); Shin-chan (ep 65)
- Emily of New Moon (Carrie Strang)
- Engage Planet Kiss Dum (others)
- Fighting Beauty Wulong (Chie)
- Gintama (Child; Child B; Girl A; Itou Kamotarou (Young); Little Elizabeth; Shin-chan)
- Glass Mask (Yasuko)
- Hanamaru Kindergarten (TV) as Aoi's mother
- Kobato. (TV) (ep 2)
- Naruto Shippuden (Mabui)
- Nodame Cantabile (Maiko Aizawa)
- Nodame Cantabile: Paris (TV) as Girlfriend (ep 5)
- Tona-Gura! (Chihaya Suzuhara)
- Toaru Kagaku no Railgun (TV) as Children (ep 1)
- Yoku Wakaru Gendai Mahō (TV) as Boy (ep 7); Homeroom teacher (ep 1)

== Drama CDs ==
- EX! (Eriko Izumi)
- NAKED BLACK (Setsuna)
- Chrome Breaker (Kaede)
- Tona-Gura! (Chihaya Suzuhara)
- Tona-Gura!『神楽家SIDE』 (Chihaya Suzuhara)

== Discography ==
- Tona-Gura! kagetsu&chihara
- Tona-Gura! DRAMATIC☆GIRLY
- Tona-Gura! Tonarigurashi Discography!
