= Kazuko Hosoki =

Japanese fortune teller (1938–2021)

- 細木 数子
- Born: 4 April 1938; Shibuya, Tokyo City, Tokyo Prefecture, Empire of Japan
- Died: 8 November 2021 (aged 83); Tokyo, Japan
- Occupations: Fortune teller; Writer
- Years active: 1982–2019
- Family: Yukitomo Hosoki (father); Mitsu Hosoki (mother); Kaori Hosoki; (niece, adopted daughter)

Kazuko Hosoki (細木 数子, Hosoki Kazuko; 4 April 1938 – 8 November 2021) was a Japanese fortune teller and writer. She was an author of over 100 books. In addition to her regular celebrity appearances on Japanese television, she was known for her belief that ancestor worship is central to Japanese identity.

Hosoki was associated with Six-Star Divination, known in Japanese as Rokusei Senjutsu. Religious studies scholar Yoshihide Sakurai wrote that Hosoki published on the system in the early 1980s and "quickly set off a fortune-telling boom". Guinness World Records lists Hosoki as having written 81 fortune-telling books totaling 34 million copies sold. Netflix's media materials for the 2026 drama Straight to Hell also describe Hosoki as famous for Six-Star Divination.

== Biography ==
Hosoki began managing Tokyo clubs and coffee shops while still a teenager, eventually running up debts to Japanese organized crime members. In 1983, she married influential Japanese power broker Masahiro Yasuoka, who died that same year.

== Celebrity ==
Hosoki appeared frequently on the original Iron Chef, where she served as one of the four celebrity judges that would determine the outcome of each match. She was often seen stating her opinions very strongly on Japanese TV shows. Some of her views may be taken as conservative. She had repeatedly made very traditionalist statements on women in the family, stating that a woman's main function should be to support her husband's career. She also endorsed the controversial visits made by Japan’s Prime Minister Junichiro Koizumi to Yasukuni Shrine.

Hosoki's celebrity fans include sumo wrestling yokozuna (grand champion) Asashōryū. They appeared together on TV specials and Asashōryū once rented her white Rolls-Royce. She maintained a residence in Arashiyama, Kyoto City.

== In popular culture ==
Hosoki's life was dramatized in the 2026 Netflix biographical drama series Straight to Hell, in which she was portrayed by Erika Toda. The series depicts Hosoki's rise from postwar poverty to her later career as a celebrity fortune teller and television personality.

== Death ==
Hosoki died in Tokyo on 8 November 2021, at the age of 83.
