= Ayano Niina =

Japanese voice actress

Ayano Matsumoto (松本 彩乃, Matsumoto Ayano; born February 4, 1988 in Aomori Prefecture), known by her stage name Ayano Niina (新名 彩乃, Niina Ayano), is a Japanese voice actress affiliated with Vims.

== Filmography ==
=== Television animation ===
- Oroshitate Musical Nerima Daikon Brothers as Mako
- Otome wa Boku ni Koishiteru as Yukari Kamioka
- Ryusei Sentai Musumet as Kurenai Mishina
- Star Driver: Kagayaki no Takuto as Kanako Watanabe/Todori
- Umineko no Naku Koro ni as Mammon
- 11eyes: Tsumi to Batsu to Aganai no Shōjo as Lisette Weltall; Liselotte Werckmeister
- Go! Princess PreCure as Ayaka Nishimine

=== Video games ===
- Chaos Rings as Vahti
- Azur Lane as USS Downes (DD-375)
