= Märchen Mädchen =

Japanese light novel series and its franchise

- First light novel volume cover featuring the character Hazuki Kagimura

メルヘン・メドヘン (Meruhen Medohen)
- Genre: Fantasy
- Created by: Tomohiro Matsu
- Light novel
- Written by: Tomohiro Matsu; StoryWorks
- Illustrated by: Kantoku
- Published by: Shueisha
- Imprint: Dash X Bunko
- Original run: February 24, 2017 – April 25, 2018
- Volumes: 4
- Manga
- Written by: Takatoshi Nakamura
- Illustrated by: Kiyotsugu Yamagata
- Published by: Shueisha
- Magazine: Jump SQ
- Original run: October 4, 2017 – May 2, 2018
- Volumes: 2
- Anime television series
- Directed by: Hisashi Saitō (Chief); Shigeru Ueda; Takuo Kimura (#11–12)
- Produced by: Kentarō Hattori; Terushige Yoshie; Shinya Shinozaki; Atsushi Aitani; Noritomo Isogai; Toshiyasu Hayashi; Jun Morita
- Written by: Tomohiro Matsu
- Music by: rionos
- Studio: Hoods Entertainment
- Licensed by: Crunchyroll
- Original network: AT-X, Tokyo MX, BS11
- Original run: January 11, 2018 – April 25, 2019
- Episodes: 12

Märchen Mädchen (メルヘン・メドヘン, Meruhen Medohen; German for "Fairy Tale Girls") is a Japanese light novel series written by Tomohiro Matsu and StoryWorks, with illustrations by Kantoku. The series was being worked on by Matsu before his death in May 2016, and he was still credited as the writer. Shueisha published four volumes between February 24, 2017, and April 25, 2018, under their Dash X Bunko imprint. A manga adaptation by Takatoshi Nakamura and Kiyotsugu Yamagata was serialized in Shueisha's Jump SQ magazine between October 4, 2017, and May 2, 2018. An anime television series adaptation by Hoods Entertainment aired from January 11, 2018, to April 25, 2019.

== Plot ==
The series revolves around Hazuki Kagimura, a socially awkward high school girl who loves stories since childhood. Whenever her life with her new family doesn't play the right cards for her, she instead indulges into the stories she borrows from the local library. One day while returning, she finds a book which she doesn't recall borrowing. She later bumps into a strange, hooded woman who she recognises as the mage from her stories.

While following the woman back to the library to return her belongings, she finds her opening a portal into another world, in which Hazuki gets mysteriously sucked into. Waking up, she finds herself in a mysterious school which is unfamiliar to her. The hooded woman reveals herself to be Shizuka Tsuchimikado, who tells Hazuki that she is in a magic school where girls known as 'madchen' are chosen by magical texts from which the world's stories are born. She also tells Hazuki that she herself has been chosen by the book of Cinderella, and has now become a madchen. In order to master her new abilities and become a full-fledged mage, Hazuki must endure grueling tests and get used to the campus. Thus, her new school life, filled with fantasy and magic, begins.

== Characters ==
=== Kuzunoha Girl's Magic Academy ===
Hazuki Kagimura (鍵村 葉月, Kagimura Hazuki)
Voiced by: Tomori Kusunoki
Hazuki is a socially awkward and timid 15-year-old high school student, so she has neither friends nor a love interest. Hazuki is very imaginative and a dedicated fan of fantasy stories. She inherited these traits from her mother, who died when Hazuki was still little. Whenever Hazuki is upset, she immediately finds herself a story book to immerse herself in, a condition Hazuki refers to as "Story Syndrome". One day after school, Hazuki comes across a cloaked figure and decides to follow her to a library. Hazuki is then transported to another world where she is told that she is a Mage, known as a Madchen in that world. Afterwards, Hazuki transfers to Kuzunoha Girl's Magic Academy to become a proper mage. As the story progresses, Hazuki quits being a Madchen and her Origin was sealed.
Hazuki is contracted to the book of Cinderella at first, before revising the title as Cinderella Doesn't Look Back.
Shizuka Tsuchimikado (土御門 静, Tsuchimikado Shizuka)
Voiced by: Rie Suegara
Shizuka is the team leader of Kuzunoha Girl's Magic Academy. She inherited The Tale of Princess Kaguya as a scion of the Tsuchimikado family.
Ariko Kasumi (加澄有子, Kasumi Ariko)
Voiced by: Kaede Hondo
Ariko is Shizuka's childhood friend. The Kasumi family has historically had a servant-master relationship with the Tsuchimikado family. She is contracted to the book of Issun Boshi.
Mai Sadohara (佐渡原 舞, Sadohara Mai)
Voiced by: Hiyori Nitta
Mai is a shy girl who dislikes malice. She has a black belt in karate and knows Krav Maga. She is contracted to the book of The Grateful Crane.
Sachi Hino (日野さち, Hino Sachi)
Voiced by: Azusa Tadokoro
Sachi is an overconfident girl. She is contracted to the book of Shita-kiri Suzume.
Headmaster Sugami (崇神学園長, Sugami Gakuen-chō)
Voiced by: Akemi Okamura
Sugami is the Principal of Kuzunoha Girl's Magic Academy.

=== Coalition (Allied Union) ===
Yumilia Qazan (ユーミリア・カザン, Yūmiria Kazan)
Voiced by: Lynn
Yumilia is the team leader of the Coalition. She is contracted to the book of Shuten douji.
Charles Giovanni
Voiced by: Emi Miyajima
Charles is Yumilia's airheaded friend. She has no sense of direction, and has a habit of telling unconvincing lies. She is contracted to the book of Puss in Boots.
Molly C. Quinn
Voiced by: Sayaka Kaneko
Molly is contracted to the book of Pied Piper of Hamelin.

=== American School ===
Lynne Daves (リン・デイヴス, Rin Deivusu)
Voiced by: Rina Hidaka
Lynne is the leader of the American School. She hides her cruel personality with a cutesy facade; she would use any means necessary to succeed. She is contracted to the book of The Little Match Girl.
Angelina Daves (アンジェリーナ)
Voiced by: Amina Satō
Angelina comes from the same orphanage as Lynne. She is contracted to the book of Santa Claus.

=== Russian School ===
Maria Rasputin (マリア・ラスプーチン, Maria Rasupūchin)
Voiced by: Airi Ōtsu
Maria is the leader of the Russian School who is contracted to the book of The Gigantic Turnip.
Tatiana Boyarskii (タチアナ)
Voiced by: Ari Ozawa
Tatiana is sweet and kind yet naive, making her prone to tricks and manipulation. Her Origins was damaged from an enemy attack. She is contracted to the book of Ivan the Fool.

=== German School ===
Agathe Arier (アガーテ・アーリア, Agāte Āria)
Voiced by: Ai Kakuma
Agathe is the leader of the German School. She is contracted to the book of Der Freischutz.

=== British School ===
Arthur Pendragon (アーサー・ペンドラゴン, Āsā Pendoragon)
Voiced by: Reina Ueda
Arthur is the leader of the British School. She has the ability to bond with animals. She is contracted to the book of The Legend of King Arthur.

=== BRICS ===
Li Xuemei (李雪梅)
Voiced by: Maya Yoshioka
Xuemei is the leader of the Chinese faction of BRICS. She is contracted to the book of The Eight Immortals Depart and Travel to the East.
Mahakali (マハーカーリー, Mahākārī)
Voiced by: Yuna Kamakura
Mahakali is the leader of the Indian faction of BRICS. She loves beautiful things, and has a queenly demeanor. She is contracted to the book of Ramayana.

== Media ==
=== Light novels ===
Märchen Mädchen is written by Tomohiro Matsu and StoryWorks with illustrations by Kantoku. Shueisha published four volumes between February 24, 2017, and April 25, 2018, under their Dash X Bunko imprint.

No.	Release date	ISBN
1	February 24, 2017	978-4-08-631171-7
2	July 25, 2017	978-4-08-631193-9
3	December 22, 2017	978-4-08-631218-9
4	April 25, 2018	978-4-08-631238-7

=== Manga ===
A manga adaptation, written by Takatoshi Nakamura and illustrated by Kiyotsugu Yamagata, was serialized in Shueisha's Jump Square magazine from October 4, 2017 to May 2, 2018 and was collected in two tankōbon volumes.

No.	Release date	ISBN
1	January 4, 2018	978-4-08-881325-7
2	June 4, 2018	978-4-08-881490-2

=== Anime ===
A 12-episode anime television series adaptation produced by Hoods Entertainment aired from January 11 to March 29, 2018, on AT-X, Tokyo MX and BS11. Hisashi Saito is credited as chief director for the series, Shigeru Ueda is directing the series with Matsu credited for writing the scripts and Yuki Morikawa adapting Kantoku's original character design for animation. The opening theme is "Watashi no Tame no Monogatari: My Uncompleted Story" (わたしのための物語 〜My Uncompleted Story〜; A Story for the Sake of Myself: My Uncompleted Story) by Fhána and the ending theme is "Sleepland" by Reina Ueda. Crunchyroll is streaming the series. On March 28, 2018, the series' broadcast was put on hiatus with the fate of final two episodes unknown. Episodes 11 and 12 were originally scheduled to premiere in December 2018, but they aired on AT-X on April 25, 2019.

No.	Title (Note: All English episode titles are taken from Crunchyroll.)	Original release date
1	"Story Syndrome" "Monogatari Shōkōgun" (物語症候群)	January 11, 2018
2	"First Magic" "Hajimete no Mahō" (はじめての魔法)	January 18, 2018
3	"The Hexennacht is Here" "Hekusennahato ga Yattekita" (ヘクセンナハトがやってきた)	January 25, 2018
4	"A Place to Be, a Place to Call Home" "Irubeki Baso, Kaeru Basho" (いるべき場所、帰る場所)	February 1, 2018
5	"Farewell, My Magic" "Sayonara, Watashi no Mahō" (さよなら、私の魔法)	February 8, 2018
6	"Cinderella Doesn't Look Back" "Shinderera wa Furimukanai" (シンデレラは振り向かない)	February 15, 2018
7	"The Allegory of The Honest Man" "Shōjiki-mono no Gūwa" (正直者の寓話)	February 22, 2018
8	"Pull Out a Big Turnip" "Ōkina Kabu o Nuke" (大きなカブを抜け)	March 1, 2018
9	"Companions on a Journey, and Whimsical Traps" "Tabi wa Michizure Wana wa Kimagure" (旅は道連れ罠は気まぐれ)	March 22, 2018
10	"The Moon Flower Blooms Twice" "Tsuki no Hana wa Nido Saku" (月の花は二度咲く)	March 29, 2018
11	"Twilight of Der Freischütz" "Madan no Tasogare" (魔弾の黄昏)	April 25, 2019
12	"Magic of Happy End" "Happī Endo no Mahō" (ハッピーエンドの魔法)	April 25, 2019
