= +Anima =

Japanese manga series by Natsumi Mukai

- First tankōbon volume cover
- Genre: Fantasy; Comedy; Mystery
- Manga
- Written by: Natsumi Mukai
- Published by: MediaWorks
- English publisher: AUS: Madman Entertainment; NA: Tokyopop
- Magazine: Dengeki Comic Gao!
- Original run: December 27, 1999 – January 27, 2005
- Volumes: 10

+Anima (Japanese: プラスアニマ) (stylized as +ANIMA) is a Japanese manga series written and illustrated by Natsumi Mukai. It was serialized in MediaWorks's Shōnen manga magazine Dengeki Comic Gao! from December 1999 to January 2005, with its chapters collected in ten tankōbon volumes. The story focuses on four +Anima—humans who have metamorphic abilities, which has caused them to be shunned by society.

The series was licensed for an English-language release in North America by Tokyopop and in Australia and New Zealand by Madman Entertainment.

== Plot ==
The story follows four +Anima children: Cooro, Husky, Senri, and Nana, who are brought together by their +Anima powers and search for others like themselves and a place to belong. Along the way, they encounter villains and friends as well as other +Anima as they travel from town to town and become involved in local events. Over the course of the story, more is revealed about the characters' pasts and their world.

== Setting ==
The series takes place on an island continent divided between the nations of Astaria and Sailand, which are mostly desert, though Astaria has more varied environments, such as steppes and forests. They are separated by the Moss Mountain range, which is home to the independent Kim-un-kur tribes.

Some humans, known as +Anima, have the ability to transform one or more of their body parts into those of an animal and may possess some of that animal's behavioral characteristics. Some are capable of more drastic changes, such as transforming their entire body. These powers are activated at will, and when inactive, these body parts return to normal. If they lose control of their powers, they risk being consumed by their +Anima, causing them to rampage. +Anima have a black, tattoo-like marking on their body that determines their +Anima. +Anima are not treated kindly by others because their powers make them different from "normal" humans.

+Anima are not born naturally, and the children of +Anima are human. They instead gain their +Anima in times of stress or danger, such as Husky gaining his fish +Anima after nearly drowning. It is unknown if the children of +Anima are more likely to become +Anima themselves or if they will naturally gain the same powers. Senri's brother and father were both bear +Anima, but this is the only instance of a "family" of +Anima in the series.

== Characters ==
- Cooro (クーロ, Kūro) is a crow +Anima who can summon black feathered wings from his back that allow him to fly. He loves apples. Cooro is naive and absent-minded, but remains optimistic and cheerful. In Cooro's hometown, it is said that the souls of the dead are taken to heaven by crows that gather around the body. His mother died in childbirth and, when the crows gathered over her body, he was born with a crow +Anima and tried to follow her soul. Because he was born an +Anima rather than a human who later awakened their powers, he does not know what it is like to be human. Because of his black wings, Cooro is sometimes mistaken for a black angel: a messenger of death. Cooro has the ability to sense +Anima, which Fly exploits to have him locate +Anima so he can steal their +Anima and give them to Blanca, who he claims is an angel +Anima and an artificial lifeform who was found beneath the city. Cooro had promised to give Fly his wings when he was older so that he could fly with Blanca, but regains them after Fly's wings dissolve and he falls to his death along with Blanca. In Mukai's original short story, Cooro was more violent and wielded a hatchet. He also had larger wings and a bird-like tail.
- Husky (ハスキー, Hasukī), real name Myrrha, is a fish +Anima whose legs transform into a fish tail when in water; he also has gills that allow him to breathe underwater. He wields a long staff that he took from the Beehive Manor. He first meets Cooro after he helps him escape from a circus sideshow in which he was performing as a mermaid princess. He is afraid of water because Lady Dylana, a rival queen and Keane's mother, attempted to drown him, which caused him to gain his +Anima. He dislikes girls because he thinks that they are foolish and because he witnessed the Queens of Sailand fighting for the King's affection when he was younger. It is later revealed that his mother is from the North and that he is a wealthy prince who was ridiculed for his effeminate appearance and his "husky" voice. In Mukai's original short story, Husky was more brash and looked older. As well, the belt around the collar of his cape was smaller and his staff had a different design.
- Senri (センリ, Senri), is a bear +Anima who can transform his right arm into that of a bear. He is the strongest member of the group and excels at melee combat, but also wields a falchion-like sword which he uses to cut wood and bones. He is good at cooking, and honey is his favorite food. Senri first meets Cooro and Husky at the village of Abon, where he was protecting its plants from a gang, and joins them after they help him fight them. He carries with him a book in which he keeps various items and flowers, which is later revealed to be the key to his memories. As a result of having to kill his father Riiya after the bear spirit Amurui possessed him, he suffers from trauma and memory loss and does not speak much. He wears an eyepatch to keep his +Anima under control, as without it he transforms into a full body +Anima and goes berserk. In Mukai's original short story, Senri had armor plates on his bear arm and was more talkative.
- Nana (ナナ) is a bat +Anima who can summon bat wings from her back that allow her to fly and can grow her ears, giving her superior hearing that can detect sounds in the ultrasound frequency. She also has uniquely developed vocal cords which allow her to emit ultrasound waves from her mouth, which she uses for navigation or as a form of attack. She is kind and dislikes violence, and as the series progresses, she is shown to have feelings for Husky. She later reveals that her drunken father beat her and her mother and she fled after accidentally stabbing him with her stitching scissors. While hiding, he attempted to kill her, which caused her to become a bat +Anima and defend herself against him. It is implied that he killed her mother, possibly in an attempt to protect her, as she had become an orphan Eventually, she joined a group of all-girl orphans in the city of Octopus, but later fled after thinking she was hated because of her powers; in reality, the leader of the all-girl orphans was jealous of her. In Mukai's original short story, Nana appeared older and had small notches in her ears in her bat form, and dressed differently.

== Publication ==
Written and illustrated by Natsumi Mukai, +Anima was serialized in MediaWorks's Shōnen manga magazine Dengeki Comic Gao!. Its first installment was published in the magazine's February 2000 issue on December 27, 1999. (Note: It started in the magazine's February issue of 2000 (cover date February 1), released on December 27, 1999.) The series finished its final installment in the March 2005 issue of Dengeki Comic Gao!, published on January 27, 2005. (Note: It finished in the magazine's March issue of 2005 (cover date March 1), released on January 27 of that same year.) MediaWorks collected its chapters in ten tankōbon volumes, published from December 16, 2000, to March 26, 2005.

In North America, Tokyopop announced the English language release of the manga series in November 2005. The ten volumes were published between May 9, 2006, and December 12, 2008. The manga is licensed in Australasia by Madman Entertainment, published all ten volumes from October 3, 2006, to October 10, 2009. The manga is also licensed in France by Taifu Comics in 2005, and in 2023 by Ototo Editions, in Germany by Tokyopop Germany, and in Taiwan by Ever Glory Publishing.

=== Volumes ===
No.	Original release date	Original ISBN	English release date	English ISBN
1	December 16, 2000	4-8402-1730-0	May 9, 2006	978-1-59816-347-6
1. "The Black Angel and the Silver Princess" (黒い天使と銀の姫); 2. "Guardian of the Flowers" (花畑の用心棒); 3. "A Colony of Children" (子供たちの群); 4. "A Voice Echoing in Darkness" (闇に響く声); 5. "3 + 1 = ?"
2	May 27, 2001	4-8402-1853-6	September 12, 2006	978-1-4278-0442-6
6. "The Secret of Beehive Manor — Part 1"; 7. "The Secret of Beehive Manor — Part 2"; 8. "Desert Rose"; Special Records; Parallel 1. "Dancing on the Purple Rocks"; Parallel 2. "Dreaming in the Ocean"; Parallel 3. "Shining in the Darkness"
3	November 27, 2001	4-8402-1999-0	January 9, 2007	978-1-59816-349-0
9. "Wings of the Wind — Part 1"; 10. "Wings of the Wind — Part 2"; 11. "Guardian Heart — Part 1"; 12. "Guardian Heart — Part 2"; 13. "Husky's Melancholy"; 14. "Scars"
4	May 27, 2002	4-8402-2123-5	May 8, 2007	978-1-59816-350-6
15. "Maggie Coliseum — Part 1"; 16. "Maggie Coliseum — Part 2"; 17. "Maggie Coliseum — Part 3"; 18. "Maggie Coliseum — Part 4"; 19. "Maggie Coliseum — Part 5"; 20. "Little Flower"
5	November 27, 2002	4-8402-2236-3	September 11, 2007	978-1-59816-351-3
21. "Contract"; 22. "The House of Apples"; 23. "The Boy Who Loved a Mermaid — Part 1"; 24. "The Boy Who Loved a Mermaid — Part 2"; 25. "Teddy Bear"; 26. "Moss Mountain"
6	May 27, 2003	4-8402-2395-5	December 11, 2007	978-1-59816-352-0
27. "That Which Sleeps"; 28. "Memories of Sunbeams Through the Leaves"; 29. "Mad Beast"; 30. "All That Protects You"; 31. "Beyond the Mountains"; 32. "A Story in the Snow"; Extra Story: "A Brief +Anima Interlude"
7	November 27, 2003	4-8402-2535-4	March 11, 2008	978-1-59816-353-7
33. "Dark Tunnel"; 34. "Crystala and Daisy"; 35. "Sailand Law"; 36. "Market"; 37. "Wish"; 38. "Six Years Ago"
8	May 27, 2004	4-8402-2713-6	June 10, 2008	978-1-59816-354-4
39. "Stella"; 40. "The Green Mansion"; 41. "Midnight Confession"; 42. "Royal Palace Mystery Tour"; 43. "Stairway Capture"; 44. "Black Talons"
9	August 27, 2004	4-8402-2816-7	September 13, 2008	978-1-59816-355-1
45. "Where Wishes Go"; 46. "Blue Wings"; 47. "The Angel's Lake — Part 1"; 48. "The Angel's Lake — Part 2"; 49. "Childhood Friends — Part 1"; 50. "Childhood Friends — Part 2"
10	March 26, 2005	4-8402-3010-2	December 12, 2008	978-1-59816-356-8
51. "The White Shadow"; 52. "Opening Pandora's Box"; 53. "My Anima"; 54. "Crystal"; 55. "Goodbye"; 56. "Hill of Fluttering Wings"; Afterword
