= Comic Rush =

Japanese manga magazine

Comic Rush April 2007 issue cover

Monthly Comic Rush (月刊コミックラッシュ, Gekkan Komikku Rasshu) was a Japanese shōnen manga magazine, published by Jive. The first issue was published on January 26, 2004, and the final issue on January 26, 2011. The magazine was sold monthly on the twenty-sixth. Afterwards it switched to an online-only publication until its close of service on March 31, 2014.

== List of serialized titles ==
- Aku no meshitsukai
- Aoi Shiro - Kaeishō
- Busin 0: Wizardry Alternative NEO
- Casshern Sins
- Clannad
- Coyote Ragtime Show
- Crows Yard
- Dream Club Destiny
- Full Contact
- Galaxy Angel 2nd
- Guin Saga
- Happy Seven
- Hatsune Miku: Unofficial Hatsune Mix
- Holy Hearts!
- Howling
- I.B.S.S. Ice Blue Silver Sky
- Kanimiso
- Kaprekar
- Kuwagata Tsumami
- Mitsurugi: The Legend of School Revolution
- My Dearest Devil Princess
- Neppu Kairiku Bushi Road - The Rising
- Nerima Daikon Brothers
- Nui!
- Ojīchan wa Shōnen Tantei
- Orange Delivery
- Ramen No Tori Paco-chan
- Sakura no Neko Hime
- Shinakoi
- Shinyaku Ōkami ga Kuru!
- Silent Blade
- Sora no Kanatano!
- Sotsugyō
- Tona-Gura!
