= Masahiro Yasuoka =

Japanese scholar and educator

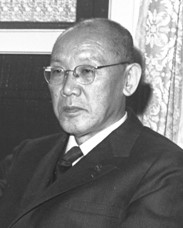
- Born: February 13, 1898; Osaka, Japan
- Died: December 13, 1983
- Occupation: Educator
- Known for: Scholar of yangmingism, teacher of some Japanese prime ministers, audit of the Imperial Surrender Rescript, naming of Heisei era

Masahiro Yasuoka (安岡正篤, Yasuoka Masahiro; February 13, 1898 – December 13, 1983) was a Japanese scholar of yangmingism who, through his philosophy, reportedly exerted considerable influence on many Japanese politicians, including postwar prime ministers of Japan. He has been considered a backroom power broker or eminence grise.

== Early life ==
He was born in Osaka city on February 13, 1898. When he was a child his parents taught him to read the Chinese classics, the Four Books (The Great Learning, Doctrine of the Mean, The Analects of Confucius, and Mencius).

He studied at Tokyo Imperial University and his graduation paper A study of Wang Yangming caught the attention of many intellectuals and politicians of the era. After graduating in 1922, he worked for six months at the Ministry of Education.

He established an institute of Asian studies and insisted on the traditional nationalism of Japan when Taishō democracy was in vogue (1912–1926). While working as an instructor at the Department of Asian Thought, Takushoku University, he wrote books such as Studies on the Japanese Spirit and Studies on Emperors and Government Officials, attracting the attention of some noblemen and military officers. In 1927, he established a private school, Kinkei Gakuen, in the house of Sakai Tadamasa who was a member of the House of Peers (Japan). In 1931, with the help of zaibatsu, Japanese conglomerates, he established a private school in Saitama Prefecture, Nihon Nōshi Gakkō, (or, Japan Farmers' School) to teach Asian thought and his philosophy. In 1932, he founded a right-wing group called Kokuikai. Fumimaro Konoe, Kōki Hirota and other influential figures joined, but the group came to be perceived as an eminence grise, leading to its end after two years.

He was a brilliant student; however, he skipped classes when he was at Tokyo Imperial University in favor of reading books at the library. In the second edition of his study on Wang Yangming in 1960, he wrote of reading many important Western works, but also of returning to Chinese and Japanese works. He said, "I felt that my backbone was strengthened when I read through Records of the Grand Historian and Zizhi Tongjian."

== Influence ==
Yasuoka's philosophy influenced many people. Mitsugi Nishida and Ikki Kita who were associated with the February 26 Incident were reputedly influenced by him, although exactly how is not known. Among others influenced by him, some through his books and others personally, were Isoroku Yamamoto, Masaharu Homma, Yukio Mishima, Yashiro Rokuro, Chiang Kai-shek, sumo grand champion Futabayama, and Eiji Yoshikawa. In 1944, he became an adviser to the Ministry of Greater East Asia.

== After the war ==
The GHQ ordered the dissolution of his previous groups and schools, and Yasuoka himself was purged on the ground of his involvement in the Ministry of Greater East Asia. In 1949 he organized the Shiyukai (Friends of Teacher); this group has continued to this day (2012) and includes a Hokkaido Shiyukai, Kansai Shiyukyokai and Himeji Shiyukai. After the war, he was asked to write the policy speeches of many prime ministers. He also became a spiritual guide and teacher to many prime ministers, including Shigeru Yoshida (who called Yasuoka old teacher in spite of Yoshida's being 20 years senior), Hayato Ikeda, Eisaku Satō, Takeo Fukuda and Masayoshi Ohira. He was reluctant, however, to speak of this.

Yasuoka is known to have edited the Imperial Surrender Rescript in some points. On August 12, 1945, Hisatsune Sakomizu, the chief Secretary of the Cabinet, visited Yasuoka at his house and asked him to audit the Surrender Rescript. Yasuoka made many changes, but on the next day found one of the three points he insisted on remained unchanged. Yasuoka met Hirohito three times after the war, at garden parties. Hirohito thanked Yasuoka for the trouble at the end of the war, and asked Yasuoka if he was studying as before, to which Yasuoka replied "Yes" with delight. After Yasuoka's death Hirohito once attended a round-table discussion at which one of the attendants noted, "Yasuoka had once said that once the emperor said something, nothing could be told in addition." To this, Hirohito nodded.

Due to his knowledge of the history of China, Yasuoka was asked to name various societies: Kōchikai ("Broad Pond Society") is one of them. Also thanks to his Chinese scholarship, he gave the new era its name, Heisei, although he did not outlive the Shōwa era. Heisei was conceived by Yasuoka in 1979, which was communicated to the government. Tatsuro Yamamoto, professor emeritus of Tokyo University, again told the government, as reported in 1995.

== Books ==
=== In English ===
- The Japanese Ethos: A Study of National Character

=== In Japanese ===
- Lectures on the Thoughts in China and Persons, Gen-osha, 1921
- A study of Wang Yangming , Gen-osha, 1922. This book surprised many people.
- A study of Japanese spirit Gen-osha, 1924
- Shigaku-Ronko Japan Navy Academy, 1924
- Generals of Asian Ethics Gen-osha, 1929
- Phylosophy of Asian Politics Gen-osha, 1932
- Doshin Zanhitsu Zenkoku Shiyukyokai, 1936
- Japanese Spirits Nihon Seinenkan, 1936
- Chinese Poems Nihon Hyoronsha, 1936
- A Revised Version of Japanese Spirit Gen-osha, 1937
- Keisei Sagen Tooe Shoin, 1940
- World Travel Daiichi Shobo, 1942
- Keisei Sagen Zen Obunsha, 1944
- The Philosophy of Lao-tze and Zhuangzi (book) Fukumura Shuppan, 1946
- Politicians and Pragmatism Fukumura Shuppan, 1948
- To Japanese Parents Fukumura Shuppan, 1952
- Shinpen Hyakuchoushuu Fukumura Shuppan, 1952
- At critical time, New version of Keisei Sagen Fukumura Shuppan, 1953
- Japan's destiny Meitoku Shuppansha 1955
- The academic source of Kawai Soryukutsu, Gosonsha, 1936,
- Hyakuchoushuu, Fukumura Shuppan, 1946
- Fukurongo, Myotoku Shuppansha, 1956
- Laozi and BodhidharmaMyotoku Shuppansha, 1956
- Heroes and Learning Myotoku Shuppansha, 1956
- Morning Analects Myotoku Shuppansha, 1962
- Youngsters are like that Zenkoku Shiyu Kyokai, 1964
- Katsugaku Kansai Shiyukyokai, 1965
- Lushi Chunqiu Kansai Shiyukyokai, 1967
- Ups and Downs of Japan Zenkoku Shiyukyokai, 1968
- Great Dialogue- Persons, Enterprizes and Management Kinki Nippon Tetsudo, 1969
- Youngsters becoming Complete Zenkoku Shiyukyokai, 1971
- Asking the Way Aichiken Shiyukyokai, 1971
- Katsugaku No.2 Kansai Shiyukyokai, 1972
- The Present Time and Science Kinki Nihon Tetsudo, 1976
- Selected Poems Myotoku Shuppansha, 1955
- Present-day Purposes Myotoku Shuppansha, 1956
- Secret Stories of Ups and Downs Myotoku Shuppansha, 1958
- Asian Thoughts and Phylosophers Myotoku Shuppansha, 1959
- An Introduction to I Ching Myotoku Shuppansha, 1960
- Yamato - Nature and Persons Nihon Tsuun, 1961
- Yuurakushi Myotoku Shuppansha, 1961
- Asian Science Reimei Shobo, 1961
- Seisuiki Myootku Shuppansha, 1963
- Toyoteki Gakufu Zenkoku Shiyukyokai, 1970
- Yuraku Hicho Zenkoku Shiyukyokai, 1973
- Denshuroku Myotoku Shuppansha, 1973
- 10 Lectures of Asian Thoughts Zenkoku Shiyukyokai, 1977
- Destiny and Spiritual Peace and Enlightenment - A Study of Intouroku Kansai Shiyukyokai, 1978
- I Ching and life phylosophy Kansai Shiyukyokai, 1979
- Records of Three Kingdoms and Human Science Zenkoku Shiyukyokai, 1979
- Katsugaku part 3 Kansai Shiyukyokai, 1982

=== Published posthumously ===
- Opened eyes - Katsugaku PHP Institute, 1985
- Creating a destiny President sha, 1985
- Nurturing a personality Chichi Publishing Company, 1986
- Opening a destiny President sha, 1986
- Shoshin Goroku Kansai Shiyukyokai, 1987
- Recommendation of Human Science Fukumura Shuppan, 1987
- Practice of Analects President sha, 1987
- Lectures of phylosophys Chichi Publishing Company, 1988
- Polishing human Nisshin Hodo, 1988
- Tenchi Ujo Reimei Shobo, 1988
- Creating human President sha, 1988
- A Study of Premiers in Asia Fukumura Shuppan, 1988
- The Heart of Lao-tze and Zhuangzi (book) Fukumura Shuppan, 1988
- A New Version of Chinese CharactersFukumura Shuppan, 1989
- Reading Shigingo Chichi Publishing Company, 1989 ISBN 978-4-88474-173-0
- Reading Classics Myotoku Shuppansha, 1989
- Active Use of Sexagenary cycle President sha, 1989
- Knowing a life span and spiritual peace and enlightenment President sha, 1991
- Lectures at Gouken Gougaku Kenshusho, 1991
- Human Science of Asia Chichi Publishing Company, 1993
- How to live a human life Reimei Shobou, 1993
