= Jive (publisher) =

Japanese publishing company

Jive Ltd. ジャイブ株式会社
- Type: Book publisher
- Industry: Books
- Founded: May 12, 2003
- Defunct: 4 March 2026
- Headquarters: Shinjuku, Tokyo, Japan
- Website: jive-ltd.co.jp

Jive Ltd. (ジャイブ株式会社, Jaibu Kabushiki-gaisha) is a Japanese publishing company in Shinjuku, Tokyo Prefecture, Japan and was established on May 12, 2003. In 2004, the company sold its stock to Poplar Publishing; in 2019 Jive's stocks were acquired by Media Do Holdings.

== Magazines published ==
- Comic Rush
- Kurimoto Kaoru The Comic
- Hint?
- Langkose

== Publishing labels ==
- CR Comics
- Jive TRPG Series
- Colorful Bunko
- Purefull Bunko
