= Super Robot Wars Original Generation: Divine Wars =

2007 television anime

- Super Robot Wars OG: Divine Wars
- Official DVD cover OF SRW OG: Divine Wars in North America

スーパーロボット大戦OG -ディバイン・ウォーズ (Sūpā Robotto Taisen Ōjī Dibain Wōzu)
- Genre: Mecha
- Manga

Super Robot Wars Original Generation: Divine Wars
- Written by: Akihiro Himuro
- Published by: ASCII Media Works
- Magazine: Dengeki Daioh
- Original run: August 27, 2006 – July 27, 2009
- Volumes: 6
- Anime television series
- Directed by: Hiroyuki Kakudō
- Produced by: Kōji Morimoto; Fukashi Azuma; Nobuhiro Ōsawa
- Written by: Takanobu Terada
- Music by: Takuya Hanaoka; Yoshihisa Hirano; Naofumi Tsuruyama
- Studio: OLM Team Iwasa
- Licensed by: NA: Media Blasters
- Original network: TV Tokyo
- English network: US: Toku
- Original run: October 4, 2006 – March 29. 2007
- Episodes: 25 + 1 DVD only
- Manga

Super Robot Wars Original Generation: Divine Wars - Record of ATX
- Written by: Tatsunosuke Yatsufusa
- Published by: ASCII Media Works
- Magazine: Dengeki Hobby Magazine
- Original run: October 25, 2007 – September 25, 2009
- Volumes: 5

Super Robot Wars Original Generation: Divine Wars (スーパーロボット大戦OG -ディバイン・ウォーズ-, Sūpā Robotto Taisen Ōjī Dibain Wōzu) is a Japanese anime series, that retells the events from the Super Robot Taisen: Original Generation game, a game featuring only original characters and mechs created by Banpresto for the Super Robot Wars franchise. A sequel titled Super Robot Wars OG: The Inspector (スーパーロボット大戦OG ジ・インスペクター, Sūpā Robotto Taisen Ōjī Jī Insupektā) began airing on October 1, 2010.

== Summary ==
The anime is not a direct adaptation of the original video game, it includes several changes to the plot. While the original game allows the player to decide which of the two protagonists' stories they will follow, the animated series focuses on Ryusei Date's side of the story, with all the other characters already introduced.

== Plot ==
It is two hundred years after the beginning of the Space Era, when human civilization on Earth began expanding into space. However, by the start of the 21st century, two meteors struck the planet, sending humanity into chaos. By the year 179 of the Space Era, secret technology, dubbed Extra-Over Technology, or EOT, was discovered by the Earth Federal Government within a third meteor that hit Earth in the Marquesas Islands of the South Pacific. Dr. Bian Zoldark, head of the EOTI Institute (Extra-Over Technological Investigative Institute), had evidence the creators of the EOT were heading to Earth, in order to reclaim it...or worse, invade the planet. In order to defend humanity from extraterrestrial threats, the government begins to research and develop humanoid mecha called Personal Troopers.

The alien race that created the EOT, the Aerogaters, attacked an Earth ship sent out to investigate their presence in the far reaches of the Solar System. This skirmish ends in a defeat for the Aerogaters, prompting the Earth government to negotiate with them. Talks are arranged to take place at a secret facility in Antarctica, but the event is targeted by a rogue faction called the Divine Crusaders. The Divine Crusaders destroy the Aerogater delegation, then turn on the Earth forces. Bian Zoldark, the faction's leader, uses this opportunity to rebel against the Earth government, in hopes of establishing a viable defense for Earth from the Aerogaters and future invaders.

== Characters ==
=== Main characters ===
Ryuusei Date (リュウセイ・ダテ, Ryuusei Date)
Voiced by: Shinichiro Miki
A mecha otaku and finalist for the Burning PT Tournament, he is the protagonist of Divine Wars, drafted by the Earth Federation Army for their secret SRX Development Project.
Raidiese F. Branstein (ライディース・F・ブランシュタイン, Raidīsu F. Buranshutain)
Voiced by: Ryotaro Okiayu
A stalwart test pilot for the Earth Federation Army, he is the next person to be part of the SRX Development Project.
Aya Kobayashi (アヤ・コバヤシ, Aya Kobayashi)
Voiced by: Yumi Touma
A relatively new and inexperienced member of the military, she is the third person to be part of the SRX Development Project.
Ingram Prisken (イングラム・プリスケン, Inguramu Purisuken)
Voiced by: Tōru Furusawa
A mysterious, yet influential military instructor, currently in charge of the SRX Development Project.

=== Supporting characters ===
Latooni Subouta (ラトゥーニ・スゥボータ, Ratūni Suubōta)
Voiced by: Riko Hirai
A quiet young girl who was the part of an experimental project to create Personal Trooper pilots. She begins to open up more after befriending Ryusei and develops a crush on him.
Kyousuke Nanbu (キョウスケ・ナンブ, Kyousuke Nanbu)
Voiced by: Toshiyuki Morikawa
A serious, stoic test pilot of the ATX Team, who has a habit with gambling.
Excellen Browning (エクセレン・ブロウニング, Ekuseren Burouningu)
Voiced by: Yuko Mizutani
A fun-loving, somewhat ditzy pilot of the ATX Team and Kyosuke's girlfriend, she makes men uncomfortable with her flirting and jokes.
Brooklyn 'Bullet' Luckfield (ブルックリン・ラックフィールド, Burukkurin Rakkufīrudo)
Voiced by: Tomokazu Sugita
A rookie pilot from the ATX Team, with extensive training and abilities, he insists that others address him as Bullet.
Sanger Zonvolt (ゼンガー・ゾンボルト, Zengā Zonboruto)
Voiced by: Kenichi Ono
The leader of the ATX Team, he fights with the skills and demeanor of an ancient Samurai.
Kusuha Mizuha (クスハ・ミズハ, Kusuha Mizuha)
Voiced by: Mikako Takahashi
A kind-hearted childhood friend of Ryusei, she enlists into the Earth Federation Army as a nurse.
Masaki Andoh (マサキ・アンドー, Masaki Andō)
Voiced by: Hikaru Midorikawa
A rash, young pilot of the mysterious Cybuster, he pursues his nemesis, Shu Shirakawa, with the help of his familiar cats, Kuro and Shiro, in order to settle old scores.
Shu Shirakawa (シュウ・シラカワ, Shuu Shirakawa)
Voiced by: Takehito Koyasu
A brilliant scientist, who is familiar with Masaki Andoh, he helps Bian Zoldark establish the Divine Crusaders and revolt against the Earth government.
Elzam V. Branstein (エルザム・V・ブランシュタイン, Eruzamu V. Buranshutain)
Voiced by: Tetsu Inada
The older brother of Raidiese, he and his father, Maier V. Branstein, forge an alliance with Bian Zoldark's Divine Crusaders.
Bian Zoldark (ビアン・ゾルダーク, Bian Zorudāku)
Voiced by: Shōzō Iizuka
The founder of the EOTI Institute and leader of the Divine Crusaders, he wages war against the Earth government, in order to make humanity realize the incoming threat of alien invasions.
Lune Zoldark (リューネ・ゾルダーク, Ryune Zoldark)
Voiced by: Narumi Hikada
Daughter of Bian Zoldark, founder of the Divine Crusaders. Lune's an outspoken tomboy with torn jeans and a high aptitude for mecha piloting. She was a member of the DC, but spent most of the time physically training in Jupiter. About her mecha, she was supposedly given a customized Valsion, but she didn't like how it looked... so Bian modified its look to resemble a giant, walking robot version of herself, the Valsione, complete with hair and an emotion copy system (its face changes according to Lune's current expression).
Yuuki Jaggar (ユウキ・ジェグナン, Yuuki Jegunan)
Voiced by: Mitsuaki Madono
Is a calm, loyal, clear-headed man with a pleasant attitude, akin to that of a gentleman.
He has a strong sense of justice, often disliking to see the weak being bullied or hurt by those with power.
Ricarla "Carla" Borgnine (リルカーラ・ボーグナイン, Rirukāra Bogunain)
Voiced by: Rica Matsumoto
A passionate, 18-year-old girl, Ricarla "Carla" Borgnine is extremely nice and caring to her companions and comrades, usually helping them with their problems, regardless of how minuscule they may be. Carla looks optimistically to the future, though her past is what troubles her the most.

=== Divine Crusaders ===
Adler Koch (アードラー・コッホ, Ādorā Kohho)
Voiced by: Keisuke Yamashita
Tempest Hawker (テンペスト・ホーカー, Tenpesuto Hōkā)
Voiced by: Hiroshi Naka
Thomas Platt (トーマス・プラット, Tōmasu Puratto)
Voiced by: Hidenari Ugaki
Tenzan Nakajima (テンザン・ナカジマ, Tenzan Nakajima)
Voiced by: Yasuhiko Kawazu
Ibis Douglas (アイビス・ダグラス, Aibisu Dagurasu)
Voiced by: Akeno Watanabe
Sleigh Presty (スレイ・プレスティ, Surei Puresuti)
Voiced by: Miki Nagasawa
Tsugumi Takakura (ツグミ・タカクラ, Tsugumi Takakura)
Voiced by: Tomoko Hasegawa

=== United Colony Corps ===
Maier V. Branstein (マイヤー・V・ブランシュタイン, Maiyā V. Buranshutain)
Voiced by: Norio Wakamoto
Lily Junkers (リリー・ユンカース, Rirī Yunkāsu)
Voiced by: Miho Yoshida
Julia Heinkel (ユーリア・ハインケル, Yūria Hainkeru)
Voiced by: Chiharu Tezuka
Leona Garstein (レオナ・ガーシュタイン, Reona Gāshutain)
Voiced by: Yui Sakakibara

=== Aerogators ===
Levi Tolar (レビ・トーラー, Rebi Tōrā)
Voiced by: Ai Orikasa
Atad Shamran (アタッド・シャムラン, Ataddo Shamuran)
Voiced by: Yayoi Nakazawa
Viletta Vadim (ヴィレッタ・バディム, Viretta Badimu)
Voiced by: Atsuko Tanaka

=== Principality of Ricsent ===
Shine Hausen (シャイン・ハウゼン, Shain Hauzen)
Voiced by: Reina Kaihara
Joyce Rudall (ジョイス・ルダール, Joisu Rudāru)
Voiced by: Toshitaka Hirano

=== Earth Federal Government ===
Karl Stresemann (カール・シュトレーゼマン, Kāru Shutorēzeman)
Voiced by: Saburo Kamei
Albert Grey (アルバート・グレイ, Arubāto Gurei)
Voiced by: Manzo Wowari
Nibhal Mubhal (ニブハル・ムブハル, Nibuharu Mubuharu)
Voiced by: Koji Ishii

=== Earth Federation Army ===
Laker Randolph (レイカー・ランドルフ, Reikā Randorufu)
Voiced by: Motomu Kiyokawa
Sakae Takanaka (サカエ・タカナカ, Sakae Takanaka)
Voiced by: Takuma Suzuki
Hans Weber (ハンス・ヴィーパー, Hansu Vīpā)
Voiced by: Yutaka Masutani
Kai Kitamura (カイ・キタムラ, Kai Kitamura)
Voiced by: Tadahisa Saizen
Haruma Kido (ハルマ・キド, Haruma Kido)
Voiced by: Kazuhiro Nakata
Kirk Hamill (カーク・ハミル, Kāku Hamiru)
Voiced by: Yuto Kazama
Robert Hajime Oomiya (ロバート・ハジメ・オオミヤ, Robāto Hajime Ōmiya)
Voiced by: Takuya Kirimoto
Kenzou Kobayashi (ケンゾウ・コバヤシ, Kenzō Kobayashi)
Voiced by: Mugihito
Norman Slay (ノーマン・スレイ, Nōman Surei)
Voiced by: Ryusuke Obayashi

=== Mao Industry ===
Radha Bairaban (ラーダ・バイラバン, Rāda Bairaban)
Voiced by: Rei Sakuma

=== Other characters ===
Sophia Nate (ソフィア・ネート, Sofia Nēto)
Voiced by: Mika Doi
Yukiko Date (ユキコ・ダテ, Yukiko Date)
Voiced by: Rei Sakuma
Cobray Gordon (クォヴレー・ゴードン, Kuovurē Gōdon)
Voiced by: Yuki Tai
Masked man (仮面の男, Kamen no Otoko) / Euzeth Gozzo (ユーゼス・ゴッツォ, Yūzesu Gottso)
Voiced by: Kenji Nomura

== Media ==
=== Anime ===
The anime was produced by Oriental Light and Magic with Hiroyuki Kakudō as director and Super Robot Wars series producer, Takanobu Terada acting in the role of Series Composition. The show first aired on October 4, 2006, on TV Tokyo with the 25th episode being aired on March 29, 2007. The anime aired for a total of 25 episodes, but the 26th episode was released on DVD only. The show featured the use of 3DCG to animate the mecha within the show.

Four pieces of theme music are used within the show, two opening songs and two ending songs. The first opening theme is Break Out by JAM Project while the first ending song is Yell!! by Minami Kuribayashi. At episode 18 the opening changes to RISING FORCE by JAM Project while at episode 14 the ending changes to "Mou Ai Shika Iranai" (もう愛しかいらない) by Aki Misato.

Bandai Visual USA had licensed the show in North America. The show was released across 9 different volumes. It was re-licensed by Media Blasters, which was released on May 17, 2014. The series premiered on Toku in the United States on December 31, 2015.

=== Manga ===
The anime has two manga adaptations, Super Robot Wars Divine Wars (スーパーロボット大戦OG ディバイン・ウォーズ) by Akihiro Kimura tells the story of the anime over 6 volumes published from 2006 to 2009. Meanwhile, Super Robot Wars Divine Wars - Record of ATX (スーパーロボット大戦OG ディバイン・ウォーズ Record of ATX) is manga series by Tatsunosuke Yatsufusa, published from 2007 to 2009, that tells a similar story but from the ATX Team's perspective, complete in 5 volumes.

=== Net Radio ===
With the launch of the anime, SRWOG Net Radio - Umasugi Wave (スパロボOGネットラジオ うますぎWAVE) began to air online. The show has been airing since January 2007 with four regular hosts, Tomokazu Sugita, Masaaki Endoh, Mai Aizawa and Rie Saitou. The show often features series' producer Takanobu Terada as a special guest. After Divine Wars ended, the show carried on and is often used to regularly feature and promote up and coming video game titles.

== Production ==
- Director: Hiroyuki Kakudō
- Series Composition: Takanobu Terada
- Mechanical Design: Hajime Katoki, Kunio Okawara, Kazutaka Miyatake, Seiji Ono, Junichi Moriya, Hitoshi Kamemaru, Toshiaki Sugiura, Kazue Saito
- Music: Takuya Hanaoka, Yoshihisa Hirano, Naofumi Tsuruyama
- CG Supervisor: Ichiro Itano
- Character Design: Yuji Ikeda
- Animation Production: OLM, Inc.
- Production: SRWOG PROJECT, Genco
