= List of Kimi ni Todoke characters =

This is a list of characters of the manga series Kimi ni Todoke and its spinoff series, titled Kimi ni Todoke: From Me to You: Soulmate (君に届け 番外編～運命の人～, Kimi ni Todoke Bangaihen: Unmei no Hito) (which is also a sequel spin-off of the creator's other manga Crazy for You), written and illustrated by Karuho Shiina. The main series was published by Shueisha from December 2005 to November 2017 and collected in 30 tankōbon volumes. It follows the lives of Sawako Kuronuma, a modest and introverted 15-year-old girl beginning high school, who hopes to shed the mistaken reputation she formed due her resemblance to horror film character Sadako Yamamura and make new friends, Shōta Kazehaya, a friendly and popular boy at Sawako's high school whom she initially looks towards as a role model, and Sawako's eventual friends in high school.

== Main characters ==
Sawako Kuronuma (黒沼 爽子, Kuronuma Sawako)
Voiced by: Mamiko Noto (Japanese); Xanthe Huynh (English)
Portrayed by: Mikako Tabe (film), Sara Minami (TV series)
Sawako, the main protagonist, is a high school girl in search of friendship, but her resemblance to the horror film character Sadako Yamamura made this difficult. Her unhealthy levels of modesty and ineffective communication skills has prevented her from correcting misconceptions. As a result, she was tragically ostracized by everyone she met, and has forgotten how to understand others and express herself. Despite these obstacles, she remains a pure, positive, and caring person who works hard in everything she does.
On the day of the entrance ceremony at Kitahoro High School, Sawako meets Shōta under cherry blossoms by chance and helps him find his way. Due to his friendly and broad-minded nature, he is the first person she is able to smile genuinely and get through as herself. Her world begins to change as she learns to communicate her feelings and form closer friendships with fellow human beings, especially Chizuru Yoshida and Ayane Yano, for the first time.
She is rather petite – a characteristic inherited from her father, who is only 160 cm tall (however, by the end of the series, she is taller than him) – but is surprisingly fast, to the point some people believe she has teleportation powers. She takes everything people say so very seriously and tends to over-analyze situations. When she is deep in thought, her dark appearance terrifies her peers. With her pacifist nature and protectiveness nature, she sacrifices herself for others, when she avoided Ayane, Chizuru, and even Shōta, to protect their reputations. Though on top of academics, Sawako is oblivious and socially awkward, often scolded by Shōta and Chizuru for putting herself down and avoiding others.
Sawako is forever grateful to Shōta for giving her the opportunities to make friends and initially idolizes him. Thanks to her rival Ume Kurumizawa and Ryu Sanada explaining what the feelings of romantic love are, she realizes she is actually in love with him. Working through various misunderstandings, she eventually finds the courage to confess to him during the school festival during her second year, and they finally become a couple. Later in the same year when Shōta acts distant towards her for months due to his own insecurities, Sawako openly questions their relationship and cries and yells at him for neglecting her. This snaps him back to his senses, and they get their relationship back on track.
During her third and final year, Sawako begins to ponder for the first time what she wants to do in the future. With the help of her homeroom teacher Pin Arai, Sawako discovers her wish to pursue her innate ability of teaching, particularly in Japanese Language (the reason is because it is her worst subject, but challenges her to improve her communication skills). Ultimately, she decides to leave her hometown and attend a Sapporo Educational University along with Ume, who becomes her best friend. By the end of high school, Sawako finally is able to clear up the misconceptions of her as "Sadako" by her class, graduating with a positive note. Bidding Ayane and Chizuru heartfelt farewell, and retaining a strong long-distance relationship with Shōta, she receives a ring from him on her 18th birthday and a letter the day she leaves with promises for the future.
Some time later, Sawako returns to her hometown after graduating from university, and reunites with and hugs Shōta at the place where they first met.
Shōta Kazehaya (風早 翔太, Kazehaya Shōta)
Voiced by: Daisuke Namikawa (Japanese); Khoi Dao (English)
Portrayed by: Haruma Miura (film), Ouji Suzuka (TV series)
Shōta is Sawako's friendly classmate, and initially her idol. His popularity is so widespread regardless of gender because of his refreshing exterior. However, Shōta himself does not believe he is refreshing. With a serious, honest personality and his father's inherited stubbornness and temper, Shōta follows his own inflexible ideals and does not mindlessly follow the crowd. Though he treats everyone equally and without any bias, this is because he keeps a certain distance between himself and others, excluding those who he regards as familiar and trustworthy. In Sawako's case, he regarded her existence as special to him from the beginning.
Shōta's family owns a sportswear store, and his father is a baseball coach. He has known his best friend Ryu Sanada and Chizuru Yoshida since elementary school. Ever since he was a young boy, Shōta was on his father's baseball league team, and played along with Ryu on the middle school baseball team. However, due to his strained relationship with his father, and his mother's failing health, Shōta quit playing baseball in High School "before he could hate it", a decision that disappointed his homeroom teacher Pin, and angered his father. Thus, he does not belong to any club in high school, though still attends Pin's morning practices.
When he sees Sawako smile on the day of the entrance ceremony, Shōta immediately feels a need to get to know her better. Willing to look past false rumors about her, Kazehaya is able to see who Sawako truly is, and feels a deep admiration for her strength, optimism and kindness. Early on he recognizes these are feelings of romantic love, though is unaware she feels the same way. Despite her gratefulness towards him, Shōta is unassuming about the impact he has on her, believing Sawako is able to stand up and make everything possible with her own willpower, regardless of the circumstances, the very thing he had always wanted to be able to do.
During his second year, Shōta begins to feel depressed when Sawako does not give him chocolates on Valentine's Day, unaware she had been too nervous to give him any. Attempting to work through the misunderstandings plaguing them, he eventually confesses to her during the school festival, promising to always take care of her. After, she confesses her own feelings, and they become a couple. Later, Shōta begins to avoid Sawako for many months because of his own fear of not being the refreshing persona he believes Sawako is in love with, unconsciously causing a rift in their relationship. It is only after Sawako deems him a liar for ignoring her, does he realizes not facing his fear was his mistake, and they get their relationship back on track.
Shōta's relationship with his father throughout the series is sour, as he believes Shōta is irresponsible and dependent on others. As a result, Shōta is constantly trying to prove to his father he can be independent. Although initially deciding to succeed his family's store, Shōta thinks again about what he wants to do, and decides to return to baseball as a sports trainer and inherit the store at the same time. He ends up taking the entrance examination of the department of sports science at a local university. With the final full confidence, he is able to make his own decisions, and he makes amends with his father.
Some time later, Shōta returns to the place where he first met Sawako after graduating from university, and reunites with and hugs Sawako at the place where they first met.
Ayane Yano (矢野 あやね, Yano Ayane)
Voiced by: Miyuki Sawashiro (Japanese); Erica Mendez (English)
Portrayed by: Natsuna Watanabe (film), Rinka Kumada (TV series)
Ayane is a close friend of Sawako's and part of Kitahoro's advanced school program. She is fashionable and noted to look mature for her age. An intelligent tactician, Ayane is easily able to decipher people's intentions and use them to her advantage. On the other hand, she gives just enough information to leave enemies and friends alike wondering and thus, force them forward. Generally, Ayane is strong-willed and caring, but also calculating and cold. Though appearing to be a self-assured individual, Ayane is actually quite shy. She suffers from an aversion to taking risks and striving towards her dreams like her friends. For this reason, she envies them and has severe lack of self-esteem, thinking of herself as a cruel coward. However, Pin affirms she is nice, surprising her.
From a young age, Ayane was cautious academically and socially, easily giving up and never striving beyond her abilities. Retaining an aloof demeanor, she was a social recluse who hated being around others. Though once the captain and setter of her middle school volleyball team, after a sticky incident where she was shunned by her team, she quit before the last tournament and moved to a different high school (Kitahoro).
During freshman year, she makes her first true friends, Chizuru Yoshida and Sawako Kuronuma. Admittedly, they are the only people she has ever extended a hand to outside her immediate family, for they were the first to inspire her with their sincerity and courage. Fiercely loyal to them, she often takes up the role of an elder sister who supports and advises them. However, even with them, Ayane does not confide her own worries or intimate details, preferring to not make them worry about her. During her second year, a schoolmate named Mogi confesses to her, and she agrees to date him, but their relationship instantly falls apart when she realizes he was just using her. Despite her many romances, Ayane has never actually fallen in love. Kento Miura comforts and forms a crush on her, and though Ayane is not in love with him, she is moved by his sincerity and agrees to date him. Throughout her senior year, Ayane struggles with what she wants to do when she graduates, and it is ultimately Pin who drives and encourages her, personally believing in her potential to become tremendously successful. As they spend more time together and he sheds his usual rambunctious image to seriously advise Ayane, she realizes he saw through her from the beginning. Ayane begins to admire him as a teacher and an individual, cherishing every piece of advice and encouragement he had ever given her.
Ayane's longtime dream has been to get into a prestigious university in Tokyo and eventually go overseas, but Kento expresses his disapproval and wishes for her to attend a university in Sapporo with him. Though Kento is the first boyfriend who truly cared for her, Ayane is unable to fall in love with him in the long run. Eventually Ayane realizes she will never get anywhere if she does not take responsibility for her own actions. No longer wishing to take the easy path, she decides she wants to challenge herself by pursuing her dream, and breaks up with Kento on mutual terms, though they remain good friends.
While studying for the university exams, Ayane finally realizes she is in love for the first time, with none other than Pin. Due to their nearly 10-year age gap and roles as teacher and student, she does not expect him to return her feelings, or ever see him again after graduating. Still, thanks to Sawako and Chizuru's encouragement, she summons the courage to confess her feelings and passing university result to him on Valentine's Day. As expected, he rejects her confession as "10 years too early", but praises her as a kind person. Applauding not only her academic efforts, but her growth as a person, Pin lets Ayane know he believes in her future and encourages her to have more self-confidence. Tearfully smiling, Ayane thanks Pin for everything he has done for her and aspires to become an amazing adult who does not shame him in 10 years.
On the day she leaves for Tokyo, she meets Sawako and Chizuru for the last time at the train station and exchanges heartfelt farewells with them, thanking them for always supporting her and vowing to remember them anytime she felt like giving up and do her best. By the finale, Ayane is shown to have gained self-confidence, beaming when a few of her university classmates compliment her as "kind".
Chizuru Yoshida (吉田 千鶴, Yoshida Chizuru)
Voiced by: Yuko Sanpei (Japanese); Morgan Berry (English)
Portrayed by: Misako Renbutsu (film), Riho Nakamura (TV series)
Chizuru is another close friend of Sawako and Ayane and in Kitahoro's basic school program. Her nickname is "Chizu". Out of the 4 heroines, she is the tallest and most athletic, boasting a streak of 99 victories wrestling guys in middle school. Though not very feminine, she likes wearing miniskirts and sports shorts to accent her legs. Because of her tomboyish appearance, she has often been mistaken for a former Yankee since childhood. Her personality is fearless and hot-blooded, with a strong sense of duty and justice. Unlike Sawako and Ayane, Chizuru is extremely loud, brash, and talkative, always ready to speak her mind. She is cheerful with a large amount of fortitude enabling her to show courage in the face of adversity. Despite her intimidating nature, Chizuru has an unexpected sentimental side, often crying out of fear, frustration, anger, humiliation, or even comical effect. Not one of the brightest students, a running gag throughout the series and she is constantly having classes during school breaks to make up her failed academic assignments. Additionally, she is often oblivious to her surroundings and insensitive to the feelings of others. Chizuru is a big fan of ramen, as shown when she wrote she would like to study it in her career questionnaire, and Ayane once joked about Chizuru was ramen in a previous life. Her favorite ramen shop is "Tetsuryuken", run by her childhood friend and neighbor Ryu Sanada's father, and she eventually ends up working there.
At the freshman entrance ceremony, Chizuru first meets Ayane Yano, and later on in the year Sawako Kuronuma. Although her relationship with the two starts off rocky, after understanding both, she takes a strong liking to them. The two become close friends to Chizuru to the point where she threatens Kurumizawa Ume to "say whatever you want about me, but don't talk about them like you know them!"
Before high school, her only friends were boys, particularly Ryu Sanada and Shōta Kazehaya, who she went to the same middle school with. From a young age, she was in love with Ryu's older brother Tōru Sanada, although he had only ever seen her as a little sister. Near the end of the year, Tōru returns from Sapporo with a new fiancée named Haruka Katayama. Chizuru goes through her first heartbreak. This leads to her having a conflict with Ryu on his birthday, who wanted her to realize her love was futile from the beginning. However, after Chizuru and Ryu are able to resolve their differences on the issue, their friendship is strengthened.
Chizuru was clueless to Ryu's own romantic affections for her, only seeing him as a little brother. As their parents are close, Chizuru's relationship with Ryu goes back to the time they were toddlers. While they were in 3rd grade, Ryu's mother Tetsuko Sanada tragically died in a car accident and Tōru had to leave Ryu and his father for college in Sapporo. Chizuru comforted Ryu and vowed to be by his side forever as his sister. It would be upon this promise their relationship akin to siblings would be founded until Ryu confessed his romantic feelings to the horrified 17-year-old Chizuru. During her second year, Chizuru suddenly finds the nature of her relationship with Ryu tested. While on a school trip to Okinawa, she hears from Joe Sōichi Ryu rejected a girl because he is in love with another girl. Chizuru begins to feel jealous Ryu never told her who he liked, and starts questioning his trustworthiness. When the girl who was rejected confronts Chizuru and tells her to stay away from Ryu if they are not in a romantic relationship, Chizuru becomes furious and yells at her to mind her own business. This fight leaves Chizuru visibly shaken and feeling anger and awkwardness towards Ryu. During the trip, Ryu finally confronts her about his romantic feelings. Chizuru is horrified and rejects him on the spot. From this moment on, she finds herself unable to see Ryu as her brother, and can only see him as a distant stranger. Both aware they can no longer go back to the way they were in the past, they end their long and treasured friendship. The anguished Chizuru finally breaks down in tears when the class returns to Hokkaido, wondering if their friendship was only built out of Ryu's feelings and never existed from the beginning.
Throughout the year, Chizuru does not interact with Ryu, but shows uncomfortable emotional outbursts whenever he is mentioned. When Christmas arrives, both Chizuru and Ryu attend their class party and talk to each other again after a long while. Chizuru awkwardly gives him a baseball wristband as a present. Ryu gives her a pink rose, something he says reminds him of her. Chizuru is left confused over her feelings for Ryu. During senior year, Chizuru starts thinking about what she wants to do in the future and decides to work part-time at Tetsuryuken. Unexpectedly, Ryu reveals to her on Valentine's Day he plans to leave their town to pursue his dream of playing baseball at a Sapporo university. The two become even more distant. Deeply saddened, Chizuru realizes she has begun to see Ryu as a man and does not want him out of her life. On her 18th birthday, Ryu thanks Chizuru for always supporting him from childhood, and promises her he will succeed in baseball. At this, Chizuru bursts into tears and asks him not to go, confessing her realized romantic feelings for Ryu. As they sort out the issue together as a couple, Chizuru begins to understand her bond with Ryu will never die no matter where he goes. Eventually, she finds the strength to support his dreams again.
After graduating from high school, Chizuru bids Sawako and Ayane heartfelt farewell. She decides to work full-time at Tetsuryuken, and she and Ryu make a promise to marry and run it together after he returns from university one day.
Ryu Sanada (真田 龍, Sanada Ryū)
Voiced by: Yuichi Nakamura (Japanese); Ray Chase (English)
Portrayed by: Haru Aoyama (film), Kaito Sakurai (TV series)
Ryu is also member of Sawako's group of friends. He is the son of the ramen shop owner of Chizuru Yoshida's favorite ramen shop. He is quiet most of the time and rarely talks, but still can communicate well with Sawako, as they both do not talk much anyway. Ryu and Kazehaya became friends when they were on the baseball team during middle school. He later confirms his love when he confesses that he likes Chizuru to Sawako.^{Ch. 14} While his love is one-sided, he is very patient with Chizuru realizing that Chizuru probably will not like him in a romantic sense, at least not right away. He's more than willing to comfort Chizuru if she's depressed, though he would rather have her mad at him as he knows Chizuru can vent out her emotions better. Ryu also seems to like animals a lot; when Shōta was going to walk "Maru", his adopted puppy, home with Sawako, Chizuru pulled Ryu away telling him he's going to walk with Ayane and her instead. While being pulled away from Shōta's puppy, he cried out for it. A running gag in the series is that he has a very hard time remembering a person's name (with the exception of Kazehaya and Chizuru as he's known them for a long time, and after some time later Sawako and Ayane). In chapter 43, he casually tells Chizuru that he loves her and she is totally shocked.^{Ch. 43} However, in chapter 59, he truly confesses his love for her, but she replies saying, "I have never looked at you in that way". In response, he smiles and says, "I know". After graduating from high school, he attends a university in Sapporo to play baseball and made a promise with Chizuru to marry and run Tetsuryuken together after returning from university one day.

== Secondary characters ==
Kazuichi "Pin" Arai (荒井 一市, Arai Kazuichi)
Voiced by: Yūki Ono (Japanese); Keith Silverstein (English)
Portrayed by: Arata (film), Shohei Miura (TV series)
Arai is the temporary homeroom teacher for Sawako's class, taking over when the previous homeroom teacher became sick during the summer holidays while Sawako was helping him. Sawako, being formal, always refers to him as "Arai-sensei", while almost everyone else refers to him by his nickname, "Pin". Pin is a great fan of baseball as well as the school baseball team's coach. He used to be part of Kazehaya's father's league team, so he has known Shōta since when he was young. Although he had potential to become a career athlete, he chose to become a teacher because he wanted to help young people grow and change into adults they would be proud to become. A loud and eccentric man prone to believing the silliest things, Pin apparently enjoys interrupting people. He nicknames the puppy that Sawako and Kazehaya find by the river "Pedro Martínez" after the legendary baseball pitcher, which Sawako suggests be shortened to "Maru". A running gag through the series, despite being a teacher he is prone to actions that are more suited to a teenager, such as eagerly running to the bathroom when he heard about a fight yet became depressed when Sawako and her friends were making up rather than fighting.^{Ch. 7} He and Ayane tend to run into each other a lot, often bickering loudly as they walk away, though on rare occasions he will give her advice (though it comically ends in his ruining the moment to praise himself). He also has a false impression that Sawako is an exorcist.^{Vol. 2} But for how he acts, Arai is rather insightful and is very helpful when it comes to his students, especially when he was suggesting career paths for Sawako, Ayane and Chizuru that best suit their talents and abilities. Pin also has a habit of believing girls in Sawako's year fancy him and often turns them down when they speak to him, stating that he's just too old for them.
Ume "Kurumi" Kurumizawa (胡桃沢 梅, Kurumisawa Ume)
Voiced by: Aya Hirano (Japanese); Kayli Mills (English)
Portrayed by: Mirei Kiritani
A girl who appears friendly and sweet to everyone around her, she has had a huge crush on Kazehaya since their first year of middle school; as a result, she understands his personality well, despite the fact they were never close friends. From when she was first seen, for many chapters she was known only as "Kurumi", which Sawako mistook to be her given name. She dislikes her given name, Ume, because it sounds old-fashioned and prefers to be called her nickname, "Kurumi".^{Ch. 11} Kurumi is extremely jealous of Sawako, which led her to spread fake rumors of Sawako's only friends at the time, Yoshida and Yano, using Sawako's name.^{Vol. 4} Kurumi does not attend the same class as Sawako or Kazehaya. During the next series of events it comes out that the middle school "Kazehaya is Everyone's" alliance had been Kurumi's idea, in order to preserve her own chances with Kazehaya.^{Ch. 11} She eventually confesses her love to Kazehaya, but receives an expected rejection.^{Ch. 17} Because she is always surprised with Sawako's naiveté, Kurumi, in her own words, "You just don't get it, do you?! Sawako-chan, when I'm talking to you ... I get irritated and say what I really mean...",^{Ch. 12} and regards her as a rival for Kazehaya's affection.^{Ch. 17} Following Kazehaya's rejection, she becomes colder to her classmates, but is able to finally express her feelings and personality. When Sawako hesitates on expressing her feelings, Kurumi tells Sawako that Sawako is not worthy of being a rival, but changes her mind after hearing that Sawako and Shōta have become a couple.^{Ch. 43} She even defends Sawako against some other jealous girls, and got angry at Kento Miura for saying unnecessary things to Sawako that had caused a rift between Sawako and Shōta.^{Ch. 43} Despite Kurumi's harsh personality, she is deep down, a stubborn, clear minded young woman who had stooped to unfair tricks to win a person's heart but has since learned better. During their final year of high school, Kurumi and Sawako begin studying together for university entrance exams, as they share a common goal of attending the same university in Sapporo to become teachers. Kurumi admits her deep regret for her previous actions against Sawako and apologizes to her, opening the way for them to become true friends.
Kento Miura (三浦 健人, Miura Kento)
Voiced by: Mamoru Miyano (Japanese); Landon McDonald (English)
Played by: Jin Suzuki (TV Series)
A student who sits next to Sawako at the beginning of their second year.^{Ch. 29} Miura considers himself fairly popular among the girls, but he immediately expresses an interest in Sawako, which causes Kazehaya to become a little jealous.^{Ch. 29} Miura assumes Kazehaya likes Sawako because out of pity, and tries to persuade Kazehaya to not be as involved in Sawako's life.^{Ch. 31} His interference with Sawako and Kazehaya's developing relationship irritates Ayane.^{Ch.??} He expresses gratitude over the fact that the two began dating before he fell in love with her.^{Ch. 51} Kento tends to help girls with broken relationships, and later develops a sort of attraction for Ayane and helps her through some difficult times.^{Ch.??} While his feelings towards Ayane grow, she avoids him, leading Kento to seek advice from Sawako and Kazehaya.^{Ch.??} It is from Kazehaya that Kento finds out that Ayane has been slapped by one of her ex-boyfriends.^{Ch.??} After seeing Kento defend her against her ex-boyfriend Mogi's insensitive behavior, Ayane agrees to give Kento a chance and they date. While she deeply appreciates his considerate nature, Ayane is unable to fully reciprocate his feelings. They break up amicably after Ayane admits that she wants to take responsibility for changing herself and she is grateful for his kindness, while Kento asks her never to forget how much he cared about her.
Eiji Akahoshi (赤星 栄治, Akahoshi Eiji)
Voiced by: Takahiro Sakurai (Crazy for You drama CD)
Sawako's cousin, the son of the older sister of Sawako's father. He was one of the main characters of Karuho Shiina's previous work, Crazy for You. Eiji is briefly mentioned by Sawako as the older cousin who would call her a zashiki-warashi and their families used to spend Obon and New Year's Eve together.^{Ch. 27} As only children in their respective families, Eiji and Sawako developed a sibling-like relationship. Eiji also appears in an extra chapter in the Kimi ni Todoke fanbook, where he visits Sawako's house shortly after her first date with Kazehaya and he takes note of how much she has changed since they last met and asks if she has been enjoying her time in high school. He is introduced as one of the main characters of the spinoff series Kimi ni Todoke: Soulmate, where he is a 20-year-old third year university student, attending school in Sapporo where Sawako and Ume Kurumizawa are also attending a university. Despite his abrasive personality, he is socially astute, reliable, and kindhearted. Seeing that Ume has shared a similar experience of being heartbroken due to unrequited love, Eiji is drawn to her and suggests that they try dating each other. Genuine feelings develop between Ume and Eiji, though their blossoming romantic relationship is complicated by Ume's guarded personality and insecurities towards her past behavior and experiences with love.

== Minor characters ==
Tomomi "Tomo" Endo (遠藤 朋実, Endō Tomomi) and Eriko "Ekko" Hirano (平野 依里子, Hirano Eriko)
Voiced by: Miho Miyagawa (Tomo), Mayuki Makiguchi (Ekko) (Japanese); Madeline Dorroh (Tomo), Jackie Lastra (Ekko) (English)
Endou and Hirano are classmates of Sawako, and also members of her study group. After Sawako begins to open up, Endou and Hirano become some of her first friends and try to find ways to encourage her to be less formal around them. They both become close friends of Sawako, who shows her appreciation of their friendship by making them Christmas gifts in addition to those she makes for her parents, Ayane, Chizuru, and Kazehaya.^{Vol. 6}
Soichi "Joe" Jonouchi (城ノ内 宗一, Jōnouchi Sōichi)
Voiced by: Masahiro Yamanaka (Japanese); Caleb Yen (English)
One of Sawako's classmates, easily swayed by other people. He generally appears in the background. Jounouchi is very attached to Kazehaya, which usually results in him unwittingly interrupting conversations between Sawako and Kazehaya. At one point, he is rejected after confessing to a girl he liked and is comforted by Kazehaya. After hearing about how Yano broke up with her boyfriend, he sets his attention on her though she is not interested in him.^{Vol. 6} It appears Joe is a character used for comedic value, often blundering with simple tasks or interrupting serious moments.^{Ch. 39} He does not seem to take hints nor does he often realize his mistakes when they are pointed out.
Sawako's parents
Voiced by: Takashi Matsuyama (Kitao), Sakurako Kishiro (Yōko) (Japanese); Joe Hernandez (Kitao), Julie Maddalena (Yōko) (English)
Kitao Kuronuma (黒沼 喜多夫, Kuronuma Kitao) and Yōko Kuronuma (黒沼 陽子, Kuronuma Yōko) are Sawako's father and mother. Kitao is a salaryman, while Yōko is a housewife. They have a close relationship with Sawako, who is their only child, and are happy to see that she is making friends in high school. Kitao is overprotective of Sawako, particularly when he meets her new friends and her boyfriend, but understands that his daughter is growing up and that her friends and Shōta genuinely make Sawako happy. Yōko is kind and welcoming, immediately perceiving that Sawako is growing more independent, and provides Sawako opportunities to pursue her own wishes, such giving permission to for Sawako to see her friends and boyfriend, even at the risk of them growing apart, and letting Sawako know their family has the means for Sawako to attend a national university in Sapporo if that is the path she wants to follow.
Shōta's family
Voiced by: Issei Futamata (Shōichirō Kazehaya), Miina Tominaga (Tokie), Miho Miyagawa (Tōta) (Japanese); Ryan Bartley (Tōta, episode 7), Cristina Valenzuela (Tōta, episode 24) (English) (English)
Shōichirō Kazehaya (風早 勝一郎, Kazehaya Shōichirō), Tokie Kazehaya (風早 時枝, Kazehaya Tokie), and Tōta Kazehaya (風早 透太, Kazehaya Tōta) are Shōta's father, mother, and younger brother respectively. The family owns a sportswear store, and Shōichirō is a local baseball coach. Shōichirō is very strict, loud, and stubborn, and is not good at listening to others. As a result, Shōta and his father have a strained relationship, where his father believes that Shōta is irresponsible and dependent on others, while Shōta tries prove to his father that he can be responsible. Tokie often suffers from health issues, which causes more tension between Shōta and his father. She is often frustrated with mediating between her husband and elder son, but sensitive to Shōta's efforts to make his own decisions regarding his future. Seeing Shōta struggling to understand his father, she helps him understand that Shōichirō wants Shōta to become independent and that his father is more sentimental than he realizes. Shōta's brother Tōta is mischievous and generally enjoys seeing his brother and father fight, much to the chagrin of his mother. Shortly after meeting Sawako, he immediately deduces that she is Shōta's girlfriend, much to Shōta and Sawako's embarrassment.
Toru Sanada (真田 徹, Sanada Tōru)
Voiced by: Wataru Hatano (Japanese); Nazeeh Tarsha (English), Atsuhiro Inukai (TV series)
Tōru is Ryu's older brother by eight years and Chizuru's crush since she was young.^{Ch. 19} Although he is Ryu's brother and they resemble one another, their personalities are nearly opposite.^{Ch. 20} Tōru resembles Kazehaya personality-wise and looks extremely refreshing, except much more mature. He and Pin are old friends, and Pin often laments Tōru's absence as the reason why he cannot attract women, while Tōru usually advises Pin just to change his hairstyle to succeed. Tōru lives three hours away from his parents' house and works in Sapporo. Much to Chizuru's surprise, on his visit with the family, he introduces his fiancee, Haruka Katayama (片山 はるか, Katayama Haruka).^{Ch. 20} He cares about Ryu and Chizuru a lot, and eventually tells Chizuru he loves her like a little sister.^{Ch. 23} He calls Chizuru by the nickname "Chii" because a person has to smile when saying it, and he wanted to cheer her up.^{Ch. 23} After he and Haruka marry, they later have a baby girl named Ayu (あゆ).
Yoshiyuki "Zen" Arai (荒井 善行, Arai Yoshiyuki)
Voiced by: Takuma Suzuki (Japanese); Brian Beacock (English)
The original homeroom teacher of Sawako's class. He and Pin have the same surname, but are not related. To distinguish between the two teachers Yoshiyuki Arai is nicknamed "Zen", which is an alternate reading of the kanji for "Yoshi". Both he and Pin started as teachers at the same time and are good friends.^{Ch. 25} He seems to be afraid of Sawako and the rumors surrounding her as "Sadako", though Sawako likes him as a teacher because she finds he resembles her father. Early in the series, he falls ill and has to take a leave of absence from school; because of that, students often believe that Sawako has cursed him. Arai is newly-wed and eventually retires from teaching in order to help his wife's family business (a sake brewery), resulting in Pin taking over his class permanently.^{Ch. 25}
Shino (詩乃)
Voiced by: Kanae Oki (Japanese); Cristina Valenzuela (English)
The only link to Sawako's past, Shino was her elementary school classmate and the only person who Sawako can openly speak to as the series begins. According to Shiina, Shino was an unnamed character in the manga, but was named by the staff for the anime. In Kindergarten, Shino thought Sawako looked angry, and accidentally called her "Sadako", becoming the source of the many rumors surrounding her. Because of this, Shino feels guilty and personally responsible for Sawako's problems, and her appearances often consist of her worrying over Sawako and occasionally checking up on whether she is fitting into high school. Shino is in a different class and regrets that she does not get to see Sawako very much. She is a cipher, appearing only occasionally as a catalyst for Sawako's interactions with other people. When Sawako finishes her university examinations, Shino checks up on her one more time with an apology and congratulates her on becoming more cheerful and sociable.
Chigusa Takahashi (高橋 千草, Takahashi Chigusa)
Voiced by: Yurin (Japanese); Lily Ki (English)
A classmate of Sawako, Takahashi sits behind Sawako after the seating arrangements change for the third term of first year. She enjoys teasing Sawako and Ayane remarks that Takahashi is eccentric. She enjoys drawing, taking photos, and winds up creating a comic based on Sawako titled "The Legend of Sadako." According to Shiina, she was just Takahashi-san in the manga, but has the given name Chigusa in the anime show and from volume 10 onwards.^{Vol. 10}
Yagi (八木)
A classmate of Sawako who sits next to her after the seating arrangements change during the third term of first year. He often consults her on supposedly spiritual or occult concerns.
Mogi (茂木)
Voiced by: Ryōsuke Morita
Mogi is a boy from Class 2-B. Shortly before the class trip to Okinawa in Sawako's second year of high school, he asks Ayane to date him, to which she immediately agrees.^{Ch. 54} Sawako and Chizuru are both surprised that Ayane agreed to date Mogi without knowing him very well, though Ayane responds that she and Mogi can learn more about each other during the school trip. However, she overhears him talking with his friends and discovers that he was only dating her under false pretenses. Ayane breaks up with him soon afterwards.^{Ch. 59}

== Notes on works cited ==
- "Ch." and "Vol." are the shortened forms for chapter and volume and refer to a chapter or volume number of the Kimi ni Todoke manga by Karuho Shiina. The original Japanese version is published by Shueisha and the English translation is published by Viz Media.

== See also ==
- List of Kimi ni Todoke chapters
