= Steam Detectives =

Japanese manga series

- Steam Detectives Japanese volume 2 from Shueisha's Jump Comics line.

快傑蒸気探偵団 (Kaiketsu Jouki Tanteidan)
- Manga
- Written by: Kia Asamiya
- Published by: Shueisha
- English publisher: NA: Viz Media
- Imprint: Jump Comics
- Magazine: Monthly Shōnen Jump; (1994–1996); Ultra Jump; (1996–2000)
- English magazine: NA: Manga Vizion, Animerica Extra
- Original run: 1994 – 2000
- Volumes: 8
- Anime television series
- Directed by: Nobuyoshi Habara
- Studio: Xebec
- Licensed by: NA: ADV Films
- Original network: TV Tokyo
- English network: NA: Anime Network
- Original run: October 7, 1998 – March 31, 1999
- Episodes: 26
- Light novel
- Written by: Satoruya Asaso
- Illustrated by: Kia Asamiya
- Published by: Shueisha
- Imprint: Super Dash Bunko
- Original run: September 2000 – September 2001
- Volumes: 2

Steam Detectives (Japanese: 快傑蒸気探偵団, Hepburn: Kaiketsu Jōki Tanteidan) is a Japanese manga series written and illustrated by Kia Asamiya. The manga was originally serialized in Monthly Shōnen Jump and later moved to Ultra Jump at the magazines start. It was later adapted into a 26-episode anime television series which ran from October 1998 to March 1999 on TV Tokyo. In North America, the anime is licensed by ADV Films and the manga by Viz Media.

== Plot ==
Steam City is a place where the only fuel source is coal, and the only means to produce energy is the steam engine. As the only source of energy, the steam engine has been the focus of technological advancement to the point where it can be substituted for any other form of power in modern technology. These same advancements also have given rise to Megamatons, large steam-powered robots. With the air of Steam City thick with fog and white smoke, thieves and criminals flourish with Megamatons as a common tool in their nefarious plans. It is here that the reader and/or viewer finds Narutaki, a young detective fighting for the peace of the city.

== Episode summaries ==
1. Go steam detectives: In steam city, the narutaki detective agency helps steam city police department to catch a megamaton, giant steam powered robots, aiding unknown crooks to rob banks. At the end, the sole person controlling these robots reveals himself as knight phantom, a known arch-enemy to narutaki, who is still out there to cause unknown amount of menace to society.

2. Challenge of the Crimson Scorpion: Gina, daughter to a scientist researching on literally clean, is kidnapped. Narutaki, the detective, finds out the culprit is actually the home tutor, and pursues her through a tracker planted on gina. There the kidnapper reveals herself as crimson scorpion and fights Narutaki's robot Goriki, with her own giant snake-sized robot. In the resultant scuffle, the meteorite crystal, source of the potential of clean energy is destroyed and the crimson scorion villainess escapes.

3. Machine baron's abnormal love: A mecha maniac, self-titled as machine baron, falls in love with the overall design of narutaki's megamaton, Goriki and becomes resolute in his desire to acquire through any means necessary.

4. Le bled, the rival: After six months, le bled, self-proclaimed rival to narutaki, returns to steam city, to succeed in the heist he could not because of narutaki. Narutaki must run against the clock to thwart him again and save his present assistant, ling ling's life.

5. Shadowbelt: A number of scientists who were to participate in a science conference to be held a few days in the future are mysteriously murdered. The remaining one's are Dr. Maynard and Dr. von Halt, of whom Dr. Maynard is attacked by a metaton, but is saved by narutaki who was staking out their place. On the day of the conference, another attack takes place, along with the reveal of the attacker, who turns out to be Dr. von Halt. Proclaiming himself as Dr. Guilty and revealing his intent, he attacks with metaton, shadowbelt but is thwarted and then he flees.

6. Seven transformation of crimson squad: Crimson Scorpion is going to steal the mermaid tear necklace from a princess's wedding and it is up to Narutaki stop her from doing it.

7. Arrest Goriki: A Goriki look-alike megamaton has been spotted robbing a gold bank and Narutaki becomes the prime suspect. In the end, it is revealed that machine baron was the behind all this, so he could take Goriki for himself as a collective.

8. For whom do you run?: Le Bled is back with a deceiving proposal, which Narutaki has to accept if he wants save the people of steam city.

9. The vengeful phantom: The vengeful archnemesis figure to Narutaki, called knight phantom is back, with a spree of kidnappings targeting scientists. It is up to Narutaki to foil his scheme.

10. The big capital tornado: Dr. Guilty has started his plan to destroy the steam city by using the very coal the city needs, to power a destructive megamaton. Narutaki and officers went to the coal mines to investigate, but was trapped under falling debris. After waiting laboriously for rescue through Goriki's efforts, they quickly exited to stop Dr. Guilty's megamaton. Although ultimately successful, the strain from the mine and the following fight caused Goriki to break down and fall into a nearby river.

11. Steam Fantasy: A giant dragon seems to be robbing jewelry shops throughout steam city in the nocturnal fog. Narutaki gets in on this and finds out that Crimson Scorpion did this through a stolen dragon shaped prop. Eventually there is a showdown between her megamaton and a repaired Goriki, resulting in her fleeing again.

12. Machine baron's fatal mistake: Again in a plot to take Goriki, Narutaki's magamaton for himself, machine baron threatens the entire city with a gigantic megamaton, but its mobility parts fall from the airship carrying the megamaton, which is picked up by Ling Ling who uses it for steam baths. But eventually the baron finds it back and essentially kidnaps Ling Ling. But before the baron could take Goriki, Ling Ling destroys the inner workings of the device, even though she could die and the rest is taken care of by Goriki. After which, the baron escapes.

13. Narutaki vs Ling Ling: A whole episode of the two mentioned not talking to each other and failing to make up over a badly done coffee cup, while Goriki helps out at the bakery. P.S. almost no dialogue in this episode.

14. The horrific king steam: A dual personality case where the lone childhood of a horror novelist manifested as a destructive personality the writer created himself as a character, wreaking havoc in the city. After Narutaki and Ling Ling faced him, the writer personality dominated over the stem king one and noticing his threat form himself, jumped to his death off his cliffside mansion.

P.S. after that Ling Ling never grew back her hair.

15. Target: Detective Onigawara: Detective Onigawara is being tasked with keeping a black diamond-laid teddy bear safe during its exhibition in steam city. At that time, the crimson scorpion takes it upon herself to seduce the detective to obtain the safe's code from him, but at the same time she becomes a bit too obsessed with him. In the end, she fails and the detective's reputation is saved.

16. Tears of a black angel: Ling Ling's sister, Lang Lang, assistant to Le Bled, decides to take a critically sick girl to a place she always wanted to visit, the beach, right before her surgery with 1% success rate. But what she doesn't know that after seeing something so spectacular as sunrise from beachside, she yearned more than ever to live, but alas, only moments after her frail body gave up and went to the heavens.

17. Submarine X: Knight Phantom has stolen a top-secret government funded submarine belonging to steam navy. Narutaki tries to engage with his own submarine variant but fails and barely survives. Next day there is no news of it the government are trying to censor details about the incident, but Narutaki receives news from other sources that upon the navy trying to catch the submarine, the phantom wrecked it and fled with the engine containing demon water, a banned fuel, away from others.

18. 36 pages in a detective's pocketbook: A recap episode recounting cases that impacted Narutaki and Ling Ling the most.

19. Pale crimson memories: Crimson scorpion has stolen an artifact that she intends to restore to a place it used to be, her old/childhood hometown.

20. Goodbye young detective: Amid a string of detective-kidnappings and Narutaki being attacked, the police assign officer Anna to Narutaki for his protection. But, at night, he is still attacked. As recompense, she takes Narutaki to the beach, where they have a heart to heart talk. But then her car explodes and she is injured. So, at night, Narutaki finally faces this figure named Justice. It turns out Anna was the one doing all this because of childhood incident involving a shady detective destroying her family. Eventually she is caught and sent to the police.

21. Le Bled's invitation: The thrill-loving menace Le Bled seeing his life to be nearing his end, invites Narutaki for one final confrontation to an opera theatre.

22. Eternal Rivals: Strapping Narutaki to a machine gun pointed seat, le bled starts his show of reliving his transformation from a sickly child to a criminal mastermind and eventually finding a thrilling rival relationship in Narutaki, all the while testing Narutaki with snippets from their shared experience through throwing traps at him. At the end of the show, he faints from oversickness and the police surround him. But it was all a ruse, by the old opera artist Grumman himself so he could, through their rivalry relive his rivalry he had with another opera fellow, Oskar. Le Bled still lived, to continue their rivalry.

23. Final Plan: After a wounded Dr. Guilty takes Ling Ling hostage, Narutaki and the others try to rescue her. They barely escape with her before the and doctor self-destructs his own base. Narutaki and the others think he's dead, but apparently there started reports of a bandaged man hanging around the city. He later remotely signals an amplified shadowbolt mark 1 to his location. Narutaki and the others think that is dr. guilty. But behind the mask it is Ling Ling, or in actuality, the doctor returns in the flesh of Ling Ling, for a temporary period. She (he) fires a rocket to completely destroy steam city but goriki tanks it. Later evn though Ling Ling becomes her old self again, Narutaki is horrified at the prospects of repairing a nearly goriki.

24. The approaching demon's shadow: Knight Phantom starts calculatingly the final plan of wounding each and every one of Narutaki's allies and loved ones, at the worst time. He wounds and kidnaps Ling Ling and destroys the repairman's shop where Goriki was supposed to receive crucial repair parts. Then dr. kitman finds out a terrifying revelation, the phantom has acquired isgnificant portion of dark water fuel and supposedly he is going to destroy the city with it, then his house is also attacked. Chasing clues Narutaki finally faces the phantom and recovers a near comatose body of Ling Ling.

25. And then, there were none: Knight Phantom has planted multiple destructive bombs in various places around the city. If Narutaki wants to save the city, he has to come to the grave of the phantom's father who was killed by Narutaki's parents. There he starts torturing her and is right about to kill her. But le bled swoops in with his flyer and saved him. Then he goes after the phantom's bomb-signal distributing megamaton, leaving a completely distraught to think about this whole ordeal.

26. The Imperial Capital waits: In an evacuated steam city everyone that Narutaki knows is trying to stop the knight phantom's bombs. Le bled is trying to deter the signal-spreading robot, Crimson Scorpion is trying to defuse the bombs, the police are trying to jam the signal and dr. maynard is trying to make bullets that would disable engines that run on demon water. Ling Ling after being healed by her sister, decided to go to her old base, there the listening device on person gives out the details of the bullets to the phantom who immediately launches missiles at them. But thankfully she survives and takes the bullets to Narutaki. Narutaki was facing off with the phantom's ultimate megamaton, Satan. With Goriki's help-after receiving a necessary repair job from the machine baron himself- and Ling Ling shooting down the megamaton's engine, Narutaki headed to where the phantom is to face him off for the last time. There Ling Ling also comes for some reason and again the phantom wounds her and then pressing her injured spot to further anger Narutaki. Narutaki to finally finish him off, jumps with him to the nearby lava pool and essentially sacrifices himself. Ling Ling, after being saved by, Goriki, wakes up to a new day where everyone is recovering, except for le bled who's dead. And just when the two sisters are quietly mourning their adored one's overlooking the slowly recovering city, a familiar footstep surprises both of them. All too familiar to Ling Ling.

== Characters ==
Narutaki (鳴滝, Narutaki)
Voiced by: Soichiro Hoshi (Japanese); Josh Meyer (English)
Son of the greatest detective in Steam City, Narutaki takes up the mantle after his parents' death. He is considered by some a child genius, but an annoyance by others. He is compassionate, and sometimes naive in his attitude towards both his citizen charges and the villains he pursues. Narutaki loves Steam City and vows to protect it from danger. His investigation style is similar to Sherlock Holmes. He uses a multi-purpose gun and various tools to aid his investigations. Despite his young age, he drinks tea and has an eye for pretty ladies. He also has a passion for toy models, and is described as "precocious" by Ling Ling.
Hsu Ling Ling (周鈴々, Shū Rinrin)
Voiced by: Hiroko Taguchi (Japanese); Meg Bauman (English)
Ling Ling is the youngest daughter of Dr. Hsu and the writer Feifer. A young nurse who owns the Megamaton, Goriki. She and Goriki become assistants of Narutaki after being tricked into helping Night Phantom. Much of her past is a mystery. She helps Narutaki in his investigations and looks after his health. Ling Ling is sensitive and caring to others but she can rise to the occasion. Her overly sentimental nature does put her in danger when she throws herself into things. She volunteers at the local hospitals since they are often understaffed. It is hinted in the manga that she may have feelings for Narutaki.
Kawakubo (川久保, Kawakubo)
Voiced by: Yūichi Nagashima (Japanese); Robert Rudie (English)
The Narutaki family butler and mechanic, he is the primary caretaker of Narutaki. Kawakubo also repairs Goriki. Kawakubo was the butler for Narutaki's father and is familiar with the older cases. He assists Narutaki in his lab work and research. He also manages Narutaki's affairs and looks after the house and its occupants.
Goriki (強力, Gōriki)
Voiced by: Takuma Suzuki (Japanese); Atreidies McNee (English)
The last Megamaton built by Dr. Hsu, Goriki means "great strength". According to the last wishes of the doctor, Dr. Hsu's brain is implanted inside Goriki's body. Unlike most Megamatons, Goriki does not need to be remote controlled. He provides the brunt of Narutaki Detective Agency's strength. He is capable of understanding speech and appears to respond to Ling Ling's emotions. Goriki is always ready to battle despite the reluctance of Ling Ling.
Dr. Guilty (Dr. ギルティ, Dr. Giruti)
Voiced by: Tomomichi Nishimura (Japanese); Edwin Neal (English)
His true identity is Dr. Hart, a rival scientist of Dr. Hsu. He considers Dr. Hsu his enemy, and wishes to prove himself as the best. The pair disagreed on how Megamaton technology should be used. He often attacks Steam City with advanced Megamatons. He aims to rule the world with the aid of his Megamatons.
Onigawara (鬼瓦, Onigawara)
Voiced by: Nobuo Tobita (Japanese); Martin Blacker (English)
A detective with the Steam City Police Department, he is a good detective but can be a little over the top. He resents Narutaki's involvement in the cases. He is also very open about his love for Ling Ling, which is not returned.
Yagami (八神)
Voiced by: Takashi Nagasako
Chief Inspector Yagami is Narutaki's most trusted friend in the police force. He is not afraid of asking help from Narutaki, he also provides Narutaki with information pertaining to cases. He likes to think things through when solving a case.
Night Phantom (ナイト・オブ・ファンタム, Naito Obu Fantomu)
Voiced by: Akio Ōtsuka (Japanese); Brian Jepson (English)
"Phantom Knight" in the manga. A mysterious villain who has a past and a grudge with Narutaki and Narutaki's father. His father, the previous Phantom Knight, killed Narutaki's parents. He hates Steam City and vows to destroy it so he can avenge his father. Unlike most villains, he often creates elaborate plans to trick and kill Narutaki. His design and personality draw parallels to Batman.
Crimson Scorpion (紅サソリ, Benisasori)
Voiced by: Chisa Yokoyama (Japanese); Laurie Gallardo (English)
A female thief who loves precious gems and jewellery. She often uses trickery and illusion to steal her prizes. She is very adept at disguising herself, which is a useful skill used for cat burglary. She also dislikes being called 'old'.
Machine Baron (機械男爵, Kikai Danshaku)
Voiced by: Norio Wakamoto
A mechanic otaku, he steals items that are mechanical in nature. He is obsessed with Goriki and comes across more as comic relief or as a sweet loser rather than a true villain. He wears a metal mask with only his left eye exposed and has an army of mechanical henchmen who do not always follow orders.
Le Bled (ル・ブレッド, Ru Bureddo)
Voiced by: Takeshi Kusao (Japanese); Gray G. Haddock (English)
A criminal mastermind whose intelligence is equal to Narutaki, he often sets up cat-and-mouse games against the young detective and the Steam City police. Le Bled steals priceless and rare items in the belief that he is the only one to appreciate them. It is later revealed that he suffers from an incurable terminal illness and steals to live life to the fullest. Although he is a thief, he has a sense of honor. Le Bled bears a scar from a confrontation with Narutaki. He resides in a castle far away from Steam City and seems to be quite rich.
Hsu Lang Lang (周蘭々, Shū Ranran)
Voiced by: Miki Nagasawa (Japanese); Larissa Wolcott (English)
Ling Ling's older sister, she is the partner and lover of Le Bled. Unlike Ling Ling, she seems to have a disdain for helping the sick. She wears black as a sign of mourning for the patients that she has killed to end their suffering. Lang Lang looks after Le Bled and helps in his thefts. She worries that Le Bled is pushing himself too far and cares for him to the best of her ability. She inherited the design for Dr. Hsu's last Megamaton Hiroh, which she had built for Le Bled.

=== Minor characters ===
Pasta (パスタ, Pasuta) and Doria (ドリア, Doria)
Voiced by: Takuma Suzuki (Pasta) and Akio Suyama (Doria) (Japanese); Doug Smith (Pasta and Doria) (English)
Crimson Scorpion's henchmen, they are more cautious than their boss but follow her orders without question.
Anna Highend (アンナ・ハイエンド, Anna Haiendo)
A police officer who transferred from Electrical City so she could meet Narutaki. She is tall and good looking.
Dr. Mayerd (マイヤード博士, Maiyādo Hakase)
Voiced by: Hiroshi Naka (Japanese); Judson L. Jones (English)
A scientist in energy technology, he repairs and maintains Goriki at his factory.
Soichiro Narutaki (鳴滝宗一郎, Narutaki Sōichirō)
Voiced by: Tesshō Genda (Drama-CD) (Japanese)
Narutaki's father, and the previous owner of Narutaki Detective Agency. He is Narutaki's role model and was considered the best detective in Steam City. He and his wife lost their lives during an encounter with the original Night Phantom.
Wolf (ウォルフ, Uorufu) and Carlos (カルロス, Karurosu)
Two criminals from Techland that sometimes appear in Steam City to steal blueprints of new technologies to advance Techland's own power. Their well thought-out plans are generally ruined either by Narutaki or at times by their own carelessness.
Teng Shing (点心, Tenshin)
A giant hamster that Ling Ling brought home one day. It understands human speech and is adept at overpowering humans.
