= List of Kimi ni Todoke chapters =

Kimi ni Todoke: From Me to You is a Japanese manga series written and illustrated by Karuho Shiina. It was published by Shueisha in Bessatsu Margaret and ran from December 13, 2005, to November 13, 2017. In 2008, it won the Best Shōjo Manga award in the 32nd Annual Kodansha Manga Award. The series was also nominated for the first Manga Taisho awards in 2008.

The manga was first published as a one-shot in Shueisha's shōjo manga magazine Bessatsu Margaret on August 11, 2005, and planned to be compiled in her previous work, Crazy For You. Shiina decided to expand the story and make it into a full series.^{[ch. 1:author's note]} The manga started in the January 2006 issue of Bessatsu Margaret, released on December 13, 2005. The manga was put on hiatus in February 2009, due to Shiina's childbirth, and resumed in September of that same year. The manga finished on November 13, 2017. Shueisha collected its chapters in 30 tankōbon volumes, released from May 25, 2006, to March 23, 2018.

An irregularly published sequel spin-off manga series, titled Kimi ni Todoke: From Me to You: Soulmate (君に届け 番外編～運命の人～, Kimi ni Todoke Bangaihen: Unmei no Hito) (which is also a sequel spin-off of Shiina's other manga Crazy for You), was serialized in Bessatsu Margaret from April 13, 2018, to May 13, 2022, and collected into three volumes.

The series was licensed by Viz Media for an English-language North American release. The sequel spin-off manga was also licensed by Viz Media.

== Volumes ==
=== Manga ===
==== Kimi ni Todoke: From Me to You ====
No.	Original release date	Original ISBN	North American release date	North American ISBN
1	May 25, 2006	4-08-846061-8	August 4, 2009	1-4215-2755-3
0. "Prologue"; 1. "Seat Change"; 2. "After School"; 3. "Smile"
Sawako Kuronuma is a 15-year-old high school freshman who has always been ostracized by her peers due to her frightening resemblance to the horror movie character Sadako. But underneath her frightening exterior is a kind, gentle girl in search of friendship. Naturally drawn to the most popular boy in her grade, Shouta Kazehaya, who she met under a road of cherry blossoms, Sawako considers him the "100% refreshing" role model whom she can only admire from afar. But when he suddenly begins talking to her, Sawako's world is turned upside down as she learns to communicate and form relationships with other human beings for the first time in her life.
2	September 25, 2006	4-08-846094-4	October 6, 2009	978-1-4215-2756-7
4. "Rumors"; 5. "True Intention"; 6. "Resolution"; 7. "Friends"
Sawako's dream to make friends shows hope of coming true with newfound friends Ayane Yano and Chizuru Yoshida, but her chances take a dark turn when strange rumors begin spreading throughout school Ayane is a slut and Chizuru is a former gang member. When Sawako herself is wrongly accused of being the culprit of these rumors by her peers, she is deeply saddened and retreats to her former isolation in order to protect her friends. This causes tensions between the three as they all begin second-guessing their friendship. When confronted by nasty bullies, Sawako is finally driven to step up to the plate and defend her friends. With clear, direct communication, Sawako is able to convey her feelings of love for Ayane and Chizuru, and clear up the misunderstanding regarding her as the culprit. The three girls officially become best friends.
3	January 25, 2007	978-4-08-846134-2	February 2, 2010	978-1-4215-2757-4
8. "Saturday Night"; 9. "Practicing on My Own"; 10. "A New Friend"; 11. "Support"
Sawako finally begins to open up socially with and connect with her classmates instead of scaring them off. Strangely, even the prettiest and most popular girl in her grade, Ume "Kurumi" Kurumizawa, is suddenly eager to be her best friend. But appearances are misleading, and when Sawako and Ume become friends, Ume immediately reveals she has a crush on Shouta (due to him being the only sincere person she knew in middle school) and asks Sawako to support her. Sawako is suddenly forced to take a deep look into the nature of her feelings for Shouta.
4	May 25, 2007	978-4-08-846174-8	May 4, 2010	978-1-4215-2786-4
12. "Special?"; 13. "I Want to Know"; 14. "To Love Someone"; 15. "Crush"; 16. "Kurumi"
Sawako finds herself unable to support Ume but cannot understand why. Ume is angered and hypothesizes Sawako herself may have a crush on Shouta. Sawako begins to wonder what romantic love is, and asks Chizuru's childhood friend, Ryu Sanada, to explain it to her. Ryu explains romantic love is a love where the person in question is special to you, and reveals to Sawako he is in love with Chizuru. Sawako realizes she is in love with Shouta. Ayane uncovers evidence Ume was the actual culprit behind the rumors and wanted to ostracize Sawako from Shouta, Ayane, and Chizuru due her jealousy. Ume's plans are thwarted when Shouta is mistakenly led to believe Ume was in an unrequited love with Pin, the P.E. coach and the group's homeroom teacher. Upset, Ume reveals herself to be a dishonest, manipulative individual to Sawako. Sawako is saddened, but let Ume know she is also in love with Shouta. Ume feels like giving up on clearing up the misunderstanding made between her and Shouta, but Sawako advises her to just tell him the truth.
5	November 22, 2007	978-4-08-846237-0	August 3, 2010	978-1-4215-2787-1
17. "Rival"; 18. "Weekend"; 19. "Chizuru's Crush"; 20. "Big Brother's Homecoming"
The disheartened Ume encounters Shouta, who comforts her on being "rejected" by Pin. Ume remembers Sawako's words, and finds the courage to clear up the misunderstanding by confessing her romantic feelings to Shouta. Shouta cannot accept her feelings, as he has fallen in love with Sawako, and respectfully rejects Ume. Ume is saddened, but happy she was able to genuinely express herself instead keeping things misunderstood. After the rejection, Ume becomes more honest and open with her harsh personality, and declares Sawako as a worthy rival in love. From this experience, Sawako begins to learn to live with her romantic feelings for Shouta. Ayane breaks up with her college boyfriend after he slaps her face. On the other hand, Chizuru is excited to learn her longtime crush and Ryu's older brother Toru Sanada is returning to their town, but she is left heartbroken when she learns he is getting married.
6	March 25, 2008	978-4-08-846278-3	November 2, 2010	978-1-4215-2788-8
21. "Dream"; 22. "Miniskirt"; 23. "First Snow"; 24. "Christmas"
Chizuru gets into a fight with Ryu during his birthday when he tells her love was futile, and he wished she had given up sooner. Sawako and Ayane are saddened when they realize they cannot do anything to fix the situation, but Shouta assures them Chizuru will be fine as long as they are there for her. Ryu calls Toru to talk to Chizuru one last time before getting married, and Chizuru finds the strength to finally confess her feelings to Toru. Toru assures Chizuru he will always see her as a little sister. Chizuru begins to accept their relationship will never change, and congratulates Toru on his engagement. Ryu comforts the heartbroken Chizuru, and they reconcile.
7	July 25, 2008	978-4-08-846313-1	February 1, 2011	978-1-4215-3175-5
25. "Couple"; 26. "Birthday"; 27. "New Year's"; 28. "Valentine's Day"
The Christmas holidays arrive, and freshman year is coming to a close. Sawako wants to attend her class Christmas party along with her friends, but she has already promised to celebrate with her parents. With the help of her friends, Sawako finds courage to ask her parents to attend. Realizing their daughter is beginning to grow up, they allow her to attend and gift her with her first cell phone. On New Year's Eve (which also happens to be Sawako's 16th birthday!), Chizuru and Ayane invite Sawako to join them in visiting a local shrine. As a birthday surprise, they get her to go alone on a "date" with Shouta. Sawako and Shouta are initially nervous, but eventually become comfortable as they learn more about each other's childhoods. Once they get their fortunes, Sawako and Shouta exchange phone emails. They walk together and part at the same path where they met, eager and anxious about the future of their relationship. Near the end of freshman year on Valentine's Day, Sawako intends to give Shouta Honmei chocolates along with her friends, but Ume spitefully discourages her by making it appear Shouta will only accept Giri ones. Sawako ultimately chickens out, as her chocolates are too serious to be considered Giri chocolates, but she is afraid to risk Shouta's rejection. Shouta, on the other hand, is disheartened when he discovers Sawako has given everyone chocolates except him, and begins to wonder if this is a clue she is romantically rejecting him.
8	November 25, 2008	978-4-08-846356-8	May 3, 2011	978-1-4215-3176-2
29. "Junior Year"; 30. "Forget About That"; 31. "Apart"; 32. "You Don't Understand Her"; 33. "Run"; KimiTodo Friend Notebook
As she begins her second year of high school, Sawako is glad that she shares the same homeroom as Chizuru, Ayane, Kazehaya, and Ryu again. With her reputation changing and classmates becoming receptive to her true personality, she feels lonely now that Kazehaya no longer sits next to her. After Valentine's Day incident, their relationship is strained as Sawako feels self-conscious and ashamed for favouring Kazehaya and wanting to be more than friends. A new classmate, Kento Miura, notices Sawako's dilemma and befriends her out of pity, which causes Kazehaya to be jealous. While Kazehaya would prefer not to let others interfere with his relationship with Sawako, he worries that he will trouble her with his feelings but his inaction will lead to others snatching her away. As midterms approach, Kento announces to the class that Sawako is holding a study group after school, which Kazehaya encourages a lot of students to attend. The sessions are a success, with everyone praising Sawako for being a great teacher. Kento confronts Kazehaya, believing Kazehaya befriended Sawako because he pitied her as an outcast, and tells Kazehaya is no longer necessary in Sawako's life now. Kazehaya rejects Kento's offer to help him when Kazehaya admits that he likes someone, but loses confidence in how Sawako perceives him. When he confides in Chizuru about his insecurity, Chizuru, unaware that he likes Sawako, thoughtlessly says that Kazehaya is the most distant person to Sawako due to their differences. Although they attempt to communicate how they feel, various misunderstandings prevent Sawako and Shouta from understanding each other. They begin to avoid each other.
9	September 11, 2009	978-4-08-846440-4	July 5, 2011	978-1-4215-3688-0
34. "Someone He Likes"; 35. "Kindness and Causing Trouble"; 36. "Haven't You Been Paying Attention?"; 37. "Give Her Up"; 38. "Reach Him"
Sawako's class focuses on their summer school festival exhibition event and parade. Ayane separately advises Sawako and Shouta each to stop avoiding each other and act. Chizuru attends Toru's wedding and solidifies her sibling-like relationship with Toru. Feeling guilty about what she said to Shouta after realizing he likes Sawako, Chizuru convinces Ryu to follow-up with Shouta. Ryu and Pin push Shouta to confess to Sawako, but Kento interferes, causing further misunderstandings between Shouta and Sawako. Although Shouta confesses his feelings, Sawako believes his feelings are only friendship and they both think the other has rejected them. With her self-esteem crushed, Sawako deems herself conceited to Ayane and Chizuru and thinks she has inconvenienced Shouta the entire time with her feelings. Her friends are upset at Sawako's lack of self-confidence, but believe she will be able to fix the problem herself. Kurumi furiously declares Sawako unworthy as a rival for failing to see Shouta never pitied Sawako and for not even trying to fight for him. Pin scolds Shouta for leading Sawako on and rejecting her, but learns Shouta believes Sawako rejected him. Seeing that Shouta is only thinking about himself instead trying to understand Sawako, Pin tell him to give up on Sawako, leaving Shouta to realize he has always been self-involved. Ayane and Chizuru confront Kento and Kurumi for interfering with Sawako and Shouta, resulting in Kurumi admitting in frustration she thought Sawako would fight back, while Ayane blames Kento for only helping Sawako to satisfy his own narcissism. At the school festival, Sawako takes her friends' words to heart and realizes that she initially looked up to Shouta as a divine role model, but the person she fell in love with is an ordinary boy. With this conclusion, Sawako no longer cares who Shouta likes or if she will be rejected, and is spurred to take on action by finally letting her feelings out.
10	January 13, 2010	978-4-08-846481-7	September 6, 2011	978-1-4215-3822-8
39. "The Confession"; 40. "Right Now"; 41. "After the Festival"; 42. "Sawako and Kurumi"
Shouta apologizes to Sawako for troubling her with his selfish thoughts, and promises to properly listen to what she has to say. Sawako tells Shouta she used to always receive frightened apologies whenever she tried to help others, but Shouta smiled and thanked her when they first met as if she were like everyone else, which made her really happy. Sawako thanks him for changing her world, and confesses her romantic love to him. All misunderstandings are cleared, and Shouta realizes Sawako feels the same way he does, but Sawako run off when they're interrupted, leaving Shouta to mull over her confession. Sawako worries about having "impure hopes" when she looks at Shouta, but is assured by Pin that everyone has a heart and it's natural to have such thoughts, inspiring Sawako's confidence in seeing Shouta again. When she and Shouta meet again, they are both able to clearly express their feelings for one another, and make their new relationship clear to their entire class to avoid future misunderstandings. The next day, Sawako learns that other girls at school are upset that Shouta is now her boyfriend, and her thoughts turn to Kurumi. Meanwhile, Kurumi confronts the girls who once tried to bully Sawako, acknowledging she used them before to isolate Sawako from Kazehaya. When the girls accuse Kurumi of being the same as they are, she agrees and adds the only girl who is different is Sawako, who has arrived to hear Kurumi defending her.
11	June 11, 2010	978-4-08-846539-5	November 1, 2011	978-1-4215-3922-5
43. "Because of You"; 44. "At That Time"; 45. "Almost Summer Break"; 46. "Date"
The girls refuse to believe that Sawako and Kazehaya are truly a couple, but Kurumi tells them to respect Kazehaya's decision and points out how he won't forgive them for hurting Sawako. When the girls turn on Kurumi, Sawako declares that she is Kurumi's rival and Ayane and Chizuru tell the girls to get over their unrequited feelings. Shouta thanks Ryu for listening to his troubles and Pin for advising him. Sawako informs Kurumi that she is dating Kazehaya, but neither asks for thanks or apologizes to her. Kurumi tells that Sawako was the reason why she had the courage to confess to Kazehaya and was glad Sawako was her rival. Kurumi admits to Kento and Ayane it would have impossible for her to have a romantic relationship with Kazehaya because she was dishonest and manipulative, and she is relieved it is over. Sawako thinks about Kurumi's heartbreak, but realizes there's nothing she can do and vows to always treasure Shouta to honour her. Shouta recalls meeting Sawako; he noticed how he never saw her smile after their first meeting but gradually connected with her and fell in love. As summer break begins, Sawako learns that she missed Shouta's birthday back in May and wonders how to make it up to him. Ayane comments to Pin that she is a cruel, calculating coward, and completely unlike Sawako and Chizuru, but Pin astonishes Ayane by telling her she's a kind girl. Chizuru visits Ryu, who gives her a family photo taken at Toru's wedding, and asks her to state his good qualities. After Chizuru says he is kind, honest, and caring, Ryu smiles and replies he is patient. Sawako goes on her first official date with Shouta to a planetarium and finally gives him the gifts she originally couldn't give to him. When she admits she doesn't know how to be a proper girlfriend and wants their relationship to feel normal, Shouta assures her to just be herself and they should not waste their time together after thinking their respective loves were unrequited.
12	September 24, 2010	978-4-08-846568-5	January 3, 2012	978-1-4215-4023-8
47. "Just a Little Bit"; 48. "Do I Look Normal?"; 49. "There's No Way I Would Hate You"; 50. "You're Too Loud"
Due to her failing grades, Chizuru has to attend summer school. Although their grades are well off, Sawako and Ayane decide to keep her company and study. Afterwards, the three best friends walk home together and discuss many topics, including Sawako's date with Shouta and how Ayane and Chizuru were bitter rivals before they became best friends. As Sawako is still trying to feel natural about being in a relationship with Shouta, she is at a loss of what to tell her parents. Sawako's mother, Youko Kuronuma, suddenly discovers them while they are on a date. Shouta politely introduces himself, and Youko invites Shouta to have dinner with them. Sawako lets her father, Kitao Kuronuma, know that she is now dating Shouta, and he is shaken. Although their meeting initially starts off rocky, mostly due to Sawako's father's overprotectiveness and distrustfulness, Shouta and Kitao eventually hit it off after he realizes that Shouta is worthy of his daughter. Shouta assures Sawako that he will never hate her, and promises Kitao that he will date her seriously. Kitao and Youko thank Shouta for influencing Sawako to become more sociable and confident.
13	March 11, 2011	978-4-08-846635-4	March 6, 2012	978-1-4215-4120-4
51. "Summer and the Beach"; 52. "The Kazehaya Family"; 53. "First Name"; 54. "Encounter"; 55. "School Trip"
Chizuru badly needs a vacation from summer school, so she and the gang go to a local beach to relax. But there, while waging arm-wrestling matches with tourists who want to spend time with her, Ryu suddenly wins her hand, and Chizuru finds herself strangely uncomfortable and flustered. Kento finds himself saddened that Sawako and Shouta got together, as he had fallen in love with Sawako. Ayane comforts him. Shouta later invites Sawako to his place to study and meet his family: first his lookalike mother, who has health issues, his mischievous little brother Touta, and strict father Shouichirou, a baseball coach. While studying together, Sawako and Shouta pluck up the courage to call each other by their first names for the first time. Summer school eventually ends, and the second semester begins. Everyone is excited when a school field trip to tropical Okinawa is announced, but then a boy named Mogi suddenly confesses to Ayane. Ayane agrees to date him and get to know him over the trip.
14	September 13, 2011	978-4-08-846635-4	June 5, 2012	978-1-4215-4266-9
56. "From Morning to Night"; 57. "Kiss"; 58. "How to Act"; 59. "Free Time"
The second year students arrive in Okinawa for their school trip. When Sawako asks Ayane when she started to like Mogi, Chizuru remarks that Ayane never talks about her own love affairs, which surprises Ayane, who replies that she had never thought about such things. Shouta becomes self-conscious when the class teases him over his relationship with Sawako. Returning from a date with Mogi, Ayane runs into Pin and asks if he's ever truly loved anyone. She is taken aback when Pin replies "of course!", and realizes that she has never loved anyone. Chizuru becomes jealous when she learns that Ryu rejected a girl from Class C because he likes another girl but kept the information to himself, and tells the rejected girl to mind her own business when the girl demands that Chizuru stay away from Ryu if they aren't romantically involved. After wondering if she and Ryu will become distant being only childhood friends instead of lovers, Ryu confesses to her; a horrified Chizuru rejects him on the spot. Sawako and Shouta meet up during the evening, but things become awkward after they end up nearly kissing. During a date with Mogi, Ayane overhears him telling his friends that he was only dating her under false pretenses; Ayane breaks up with him. After some time, Kento finds Ayane sitting alone. Realizing that all this time, she has never been in a proper relationship, Ayane begins to cry, and Kento hugs her. As everyone returns to Hokkaido, they find themselves troubled and distant from one another.
15	January 25, 2012	978-4-08-846738-2	November 6, 2012	978-1-4215-4919-4
60. "It's Over"; 61. "That's Not True"; 62. "And Now"; 63. "Let's End It"
Fall has arrived. Sawako and Shouta have become distant ever since the almost-kiss incident in Okinawa. Kento has developed a new interest in Ayane, but Ayane avoids him out of embarrassment. Chizuru has been depressed since Ryu's confession and stays away from everyone, until her friends find her brooding by the harbour. She reveals that she and Ryu have been friends since they were toddlers. After Ryu's mother Tetsuko died in a car accident, Ryu was depressed for many months. Realizing that Ryu was suffering, Chizuru persisting in leaving his favourite food, onigiri, at his doorstep. Ryu eventually emerged, finding the onigiri and Chizuru, and broke down crying for the first time since his mother's death. The same year, Toru left Ryu and his father for college and asked Chizuru to look after Ryu. The evening Toru left, Chizuru vowed to Ryu at the harbor that she would be by his side forever as his sister. In the present, Chizuru realizes that she still wants to salvage her friendship with Ryu, and brings him onigiri as an early birthday present. Ryu looks at her with gratitude, and Chizuru immediately becomes uncomfortable and yells that his confession is ruining their friendship. Ryu responds that he had been waiting for it to end, and that it is impossible to salvage it. He eats the onigiri and leaves Chizuru devastated.
16	May 11, 2012	978-4-08-846772-6	April 2, 2013	9781421551616
64. "Girlfriend and Boyfriend"; 65. "Is Something Bothering You?"; 66. "Important"; 67. "Christmas Party"; Kimi ni Todoke Tribute
Chizuru continues to be awkward around Ryu, though he continues to act the same around her. Ayane insists that Sawako needs to convince her parents to let her attend the class Christmas party this year because Sawako and Shouta are now dating, but Sawako is surprised when her father gives permission before she asks. When she tries asking Shouta to spend Christmas together with her, he acts distant. Ayane turns down Kento's request to go out with him on Christmas and dismisses him. Shouta runs into Sawako's father while shopping for a Christmas gift and admits that the only plans he and Sawako have are to attend the class party. Kento asks for Shouta's advice on how to reach out to Ayane since she keeps rejecting him, and notices that Shouta and Sawako are more alike than they realize. Ayane confides to Sawako that she struggles with forming genuine relationships and that Sawako and Chizuru are the first friends she's truly liked. The class Christmas party begins.
17	September 25, 2012	978-4-08-846829-7	August 6, 2013	9781421554785
68. "Christmas Gift"; 69. "To Protect Something"; 70. "Let Me Care About You"; 71. "Holy Night"
Shouta avoids Sawako at the Christmas party by keeping busy. Chizuru becomes flustered during a gift exchange game when her contribution doesn't end up with Ryu and runs out with the present. When Ryu goes after her, she admits she chose a gift hoping it would end up with him; they exchange gifts and Ryu asks to spend time with her alone. Sawako runs into Pin and she confesses that she worries that she is selfish for thinking about herself instead of Shouta's burdens. He tells her that she can't help others unless she takes care of herself first and that he reviewed her career plans and believes she can be more ambitious about her future. Pin surprises Sawako with his insights on all her friends. Kento runs into Ayane's ex-boyfriend Mogi and punches him for being insensitive to Ayane's feelings. When Ayane arrives, Mogi apologizes sincerely to Ayane for his behavior on Okinawa. Kento confesses his feelings to Ayane again and asks her to give him a chance, and she agrees. Shouta thinks about how he has been keeping his distance from Sawako out of fear that his overwhelming feelings for her will hurt her. When Sawako admits to how upset she is that he's been staying away from her, they end up kissing for the first time.
18	January 25, 2013	978-4-08-846881-5	January 7, 2014	978-1421559179
72. "Forty-Five Minutes"; 73. "Paying Attention"; 74. "Girl Talk"; 75. "Happy Moment"
Sawako's father gives her and Shouta forty-five minutes to talk. Shouta admits that he hasn't been confident that he can make Sawako happy and that his feelings will hurt her future. Sawako tells him that she wants to be with him even if they end up fighting and sometimes she's jealous of his other friends. They reconcile and exchange Christmas gifts. On Christmas Day, the girls talk about their Christmas presents at Sawako's house. Sawako's mother invites Ayane and Chizuru to stay for dinner, and then extends the invitation to the rest of Sawako's friends – Shouta, Ryu, and Kento. Sawako turns down the invitation to go with her friends to the shrine on New Year's Eve because she wants to spend her birthday with her family. After Sawako's father notices how much his daughter has grown and how she has found people she belongs with, her parents think about how Sawako might move away after high school and hope to cherish their time with her.
19	June 25, 2013	978-4-08-845059-9	June 3, 2014	978-1421567808
76. "New Year's Eve"; 77. "Homework"; 78. "Choices"; 79. "Deep Inside Me"
Sawako looks forward to spending New Year's Eve with her family. Ayane and Chizuru visit with their birthday presents for Sawako, and Chizuru reveals how strict Shouta's father is. Ayane runs into Kento, who tells his fan club that he wants to spend time exclusively with Ayane, who is touched by his considerate nature. Shouta arrives shortly before midnight to wish Sawako a happy birthday. They visit the shrine the next day to get their fortunes, but receive a request for help from Chizuru to deal with Pin, who fell asleep at the Sanadas' ramen restaurant. They learn from Ryu's brother Toru that Pin had a promising baseball career, but apparently turned down all offers to become a professional athlete. After asking how things are going between her and Ryu, Toru remarks to Chizuru that being together with Ryu forever would be difficult if she doesn't see Ryu romantically. Pin assigns Sawako homework for the break – he wants her to brainstorm a list of options for her future. Ayane asks Pin if he became a teacher because he chose the safer option out of fear of failure, but he alludes that his reasons were to continue being part of high school baseball. When they return to school and start their third year of high school, Pin begins reviewing their post-graduation plans and tells them to seriously consider want they want for their futures. Sawako contemplates her own wishes against the possibility of separating from Shouta.
20	October 25, 2013	978-4-08-845114-5	December 2, 2014	978-1421573359
80. "Do Whatever You Want"; 81. "Just A Thought"; 82. "Different Valentine's Days"; 83. "A Smile Like That"
Sawako witnesses Shouta's father and Shouta following an altercation during a parent-teacher meeting, after which Shouta reveals his strained relationship with his father. Sawako tells him to try expressing himself honestly to his father like Shouta has been with her, and then tells Shouta that she is thinking of becoming a teacher. Despite his efforts, Shouta and his father end up arguing. Pin approves of Sawako's plan to become a teacher. Ryu's father offers Chizuru a job at the ramen restaurant since Ryu is focusing on training, and Chizuru realizes that their last year of high school may be Ryu's last chance to play baseball. While Pin points out Ayane's plans to attend university are reasonable, he notes that she has chosen safe options when she can afford to take risks. On Valentine's Day, Sawako tries to give Shouta Honmei chocolates, but is constantly derailed by her duties as the class helper. After hearing from Kento how much courage it takes for girls to give chocolates to boys, Shouta reluctantly accepts them from other girls. Ayane wonders if she can really love Kento. Ryu reveals to Chizuru that he intends to leave town to attend college to continue playing baseball. Kurumi offers some backhanded encouragement to Sawako, who goes to Shouta's house to properly give him her Valentine's Day chocolates. She admits that she was jealous that he received chocolates from other girls, and Shouta is happy to receive chocolates from Sawako.
21	March 25, 2014	978-4-08-845181-7	June 2, 2015	978-1421578705
84. "White Day"; 85. "Final Year"; 86. "Exam Preparation"; 87. "Desired Path"
The girls receive White Day presents from the boys and discuss future plans. Chizuru tells Sawako and Ayane that Ryu plans to go to college to play baseball and Ayane reveals that she's been going to the same cram school as Kento and Kurumi. Sawako celebrates Shouta's birthday with him. During her next meeting with Pin, he advises Sawako that she can be more aggressive with her university plans and recommends applying for a national university specializing in education in Sapporo. Sawako learns that Kurumi is also studying to become a teacher and intends to apply for the same university that Pin suggested to Sawako. With encouragement from everyone she loves, Sawako no longer hesitates with her plans and joins Ayane's cram school. Ayane seriously considers Pin's opinion that she has potential to grow against Kento's hopes for them to stay together. She contemplates her ambition of attending a university in Tokyo and going abroad one day.
22	September 12, 2014	978-4-08-845261-6	September 1, 2015	978-1421580838
88. "Don't Go"; 89. "Proud of Myself"; 90. "A Mistake"; 91. "That's Where We Met"; 45° Eyebrows
Chizuru and Sawako confide in each other their feelings about being separated from Ryu and Shouta respectively. When Chizuru asks Ryu not to leave for college, she confesses it's because she likes him romantically. Seeing Kurumi stressed from studying, Sawako helps her and they decide to become study buddies. Ayane envies Sawako and Kurumi for having clear goals, and later admits to Kento that she's been thinking about attending university in Tokyo. Kento tells Shouta about Ayane's plans and asks him how he'd feel if Sawako's plans would mean separating from him. Unable to spend time together now that they're studying for exams, Sawako and Shouta begin meeting before class in the morning. The girls eat lunch together and Chizuru tells them how she wants to support Ryu's dreams, but finds she cannot cheer him because she doesn't want to be apart from him if he succeeds and fears she is holding him back.
23	January 23, 2015	978-4-08-845331-6	January 5, 2016	978-1-42-158265-8
92. "True Feelings"; 93. "Regret"; 94. "Myself"; 95. "Thank You"
The third year class plans for their final school festival. Kento asks Ayane why she wanted to attend a university in Tokyo and learns about her wish to study abroad. When he asks her not to go and stay with him and asks if she cared for him like he cares for her, she rejects him and runs away. She encounters Pin and admits that she regrets dating Kento only to reject him, and Pin chides her, telling her life will be full of regrets and not to spend them on a single mistake. Sawako and Chizuru bring Ayane to Sawako's house, where Ayane tells them that she is coldhearted and unable to care for others, but they help her realize that she is kinder than she thinks and how much she cares for them as her friends. Kento expresses his feelings to Sawako and Chizuru, while Ayane tells Shouta that she wants to take responsibility over her life. Ayane asks Kento to break up, while he asks to try again. After Ayane tells him that she hated herself and now wants to change on her own and that she was happy being his girlfriend, Kento agrees to break up with her and tells Ayane that he realized she was holding herself back out of kindness for him and asks her never to forget how much he liked her. With confidence, Ayane tells Pin she won't take the recommendation for a university in Sapporo and that she's going to study for the entrance exam for a university in Tokyo.
24	July 24, 2015	978-4-08-845418-4	May 3, 2016	978-1-42-158586-4
96. "Present, Past and Future"; 97. "School Festival"; 98. "Forever"; 99. "Not A Dream"
Everyone continues studying while as their last school festival begins. When Sawako unwittingly says that she and Kurumi will reach their goal attending university together, Sawako has to correct herself to say she intends to attend a local college instead of the school of education in Sapporo. Sawako and Shouta think about how they've been dating for a year. While running their class haunted house, Shouta is overwhelmed at the thought of separating from Sawako and overexerts himself. Ryu reveals to Chizuru that the baseball team has reached the semi-finals, but she can't bring herself to cheer for him. The class celebrates the end of the school festival and elect Sawako as their MVP in recognition of all her efforts and she thanks everyone for giving her a role to fulfill with them. When Sawako asks Shouta to end their early morning meetings, he agrees without hearing her explanation that she doesn't want him to exhaust himself anymore, because he believes she wants focus on studying for the entrance exam for the university in Sapporo and that they will be separated eventually.
25	December 25, 2015	978-4-08-845498-6	September 6, 2016	978-1-42-158853-7
100. "Do Your Best"; 101. "Good Luck"; 102. "Connection"; 103. "Fight"
Everyone goes to watch Ryu's baseball game, but Chizuru runs away when his team is losing, unable to continue watching. She encounters Shouta and she asks if he could support Sawako even if they were apart, which he affirms. When Shouta mentions how Ryu would always hear Chizuru cheer for him even when he was focused on nothing but the game, she remembers encouraging Ryu never to give up after losing games in the past. Realizing this is the time he needs her support most, she finally cheers Ryu on; Ryu manages to rally the team for a comeback, but they ultimately lose. Afterwards, Chizuru tells Ryu to leave for college and continue playing baseball and he promises to return one day to take over the ramen restaurant together with her as a family. Sawako and Shouta have avoided talking about their future, but wind up having their first fight over his assumptions about what Sawako wants.
26	May 25, 2016	978-4-08-845576-1	March 7, 2017	978-1-42-159163-6
104. "Relying On You"; 105. "Admiration"; 106. "You Can Forget"; 107. "First Love"
Summer vacation begins while Sawako and Shouta are still in the middle of their fight. Shouta realizes that he's ignored Sawako's feelings, confessing that he wants to stay with her but doesn't want to hold her back and he admires her determination. Seeing that Shouta likely noticed her wish to attend the school of education in Sapporo, Sawako and Shouta make up. Kurumi and Sawako have an sleepover study session at Sawako's house. Overcome with guilt, Kurumi sincerely apologizes for her past actions against Sawako, who admits she was insensitive to Kurumi's feelings. Now able to acknowledge their friendship, Kurumi and Sawako promise to attend the school of education together. Sawako, Chizuru, and Ayane catch up after time apart, and Ayane considers she might have feelings for Pin. On her way home, she runs into Pin, who notices her awkwardness around him, but tells her that she will be fine when she asks for his reassurance.
27	September 23, 2016	978-4-08-845636-2	September 5, 2017	978-1-42-159504-7
108. "I Told Him"; 109. "Shōta"; 110. "Always"; 111. "Spilled"
When Shouta calls Sawako for help after his mother Tokie is hospitalized, his father Shouichirou criticizes Shouta for always relying on others. With Sawako's encouragement, Shouta asks his father to truly listen to his plans to attend a local university to become a sports trainer, while helping with the family shop and caring for his mother. Tokie reveals to Shouta that his father has trouble expressing his feelings, but he wants Shouta to be independent. Shouichirou accepts Shouta's future plans, but wants him to learn to take care of himself without help, which Shouta agrees to. Sawako and Shouta enjoy a day together by themselves, with Sawako finally telling Shouta she has decided to attend the educational university in Sapporo. Ryu and Kento receive early acceptance for their colleges of choice based on recommendations, but everyone else has to continue studying as Christmas approaches. Ayane is distracted by her crush on Pin; when Sawako asks if she likes Pin, Ayane breaks down in tears, with Sawako and Chizuru comforting her.
28	February 24, 2017	978-4-08-845718-5	January 2, 2018	978-1-42-159690-7
112. "Realization"; 113. "Snowstorm"; 114. "Promise"; 115. "Wish"
Sawako and Shouta have a date on Christmas, during which Sawako happily thinks about how her wishes for high school have come true and Shouta asks to go to the shrine with her on New Year's Eve. Chizuru spends Christmas with Ryu. Needing motivation after cram school, Ayane goes shopping and runs into Pin, who is annoyed he can't find a date on Christmas. Ayane has a nice time hanging out with Pin and feels saddened she won't see him again after graduation. On New Year's Eve, Chizuru visits Ryu's family, meeting Ryu's baby niece Ayu and telling Toru that she and Ryu are a couple. Sawako tries to meet Shouta at the shrine, but a heavy snowstorm results in them going to Shouta's house, where his mother tells her to stay overnight. For Sawako's birthday, Shouta gives her a ring and promises one day to give her a proper ring to wear for the rest of her life. On New Year's Day, the entire class visits the shrine. While everyone takes advantage of Pin's generosity, Ayane asks Pin to give her an eraser if she passes her entrance exam. Sawako, Chizuru, and Ayane reminisce about their time together and Sawako thinks about how university entrance exams are imminent.
29	July 25, 2017	978-4-08-845788-8	May 1, 2018	978-1-42-159950-2
116. "Accept It"; 117. "All Right"; 118. "Treasure"; 119. "Graduation"
Ayane discovers she's passed her entrance exam for her first choice college on Valentine's Day, but is afraid to tell Pin her results in case he notices her feelings. With encouragement from Kento, Chizuru, and Sawako, she decides to confess to Pin because she wants him to be the first person to break her heart. After learning how he worried all day about her exam results, Ayane finally tells Pin that she passed and confesses her feelings. As she expected, he rejects her, but he gives her the eraser she asked for. Pin praises how hard she worked towards her goals and assures her that she will be alright in the future. After finishing their entrance exams, Sawako and Kurumi promise to see their results together. Sawako runs into her old friend Shino, who apologizes for nicknaming her Sadako and notes how much happier Sawako is now. At the school graduation ceremony, Sawako gives a speech about how much she appreciated her time in high school and no longer cares about being nicknamed Sadako. Everyone celebrates being together one last time.
30	March 23, 2018	978-4-08-844007-1	December 4, 2018	978-1-97-470380-7
120. "Departure"; 121. "New Life"; 122. "The Same Feeling"; 123. "From Me To You"
Sawako, Kurumi, and Shouta learn they passed their entrance exams and Chizuru holds a party for everyone to celebrate. They all begin preparing for their departures. Ryu promises to marry Chizuru after he graduates. Ayane tries to leave for Tokyo without telling Chizuru and Sawako, but they find out and see her off. Sawako goes to help Shouta settle into the apartment where he'll live while attending college. Finding their time together is passing by too quickly, she decides to stay with Shouta for the night and thinks about how happy she has been with him. On Sawako's departure day, Chizuru and Shouta see her off; Sawako and Chizuru confirm their friendship and Shouta gives Sawako a letter expressing his faith that they'll be together again. Some time in the future, Sawako returns to the place where she first met Shouta, who is waiting there to welcome her home.

==== Kimi ni Todoke: From Me to You: Soulmate ====
No.	Original release date	Original ISBN	North American release date	North American ISBN
1	September 25, 2019	978-4-08-844248-8	April 2, 2024	978-1-9747-4374-2
Episode 1; Episode 2; Episode 3; Episode 4
Ume Kurumizawa thinks she's found her soulmate in Sawako Kuronuma, her former rival turned best friend with whom she attends university, but seeing Sawako's romantic relationship with Shouta Kazehaya continuing to flourish, Ume wonders if there's someone else out there for her. When an opportunity to attend a mixer comes up, Ume persuades Sawako to attend with her, only to draw unwanted attention from a persistent attendee, who begins to stalk the girls. They're rescued by Sawako's cousin, Eiji Akahoshi, and a mutual interest begins to form between Ume and Eiji, who suggests they date. As they spend more time together, Ume finds herself overwhelmed by her growing feelings for Eiji but is unsure why he would like her. When the stalker returns and sets his sights on Ume, Eiji arrives to drive him off and a relieved Ume asks him to stay with her for the night.
2	July 21, 2021	978-4-08-844506-9	July 2, 2024	978-1-9747-4609-5
Episode 5; Episode 6; Episode 7; Episode 8
After surviving a frightening encounter with a stalker, Ume finds Eiji supporting her in all the ways she needs, but begins worrying that she's depending on him too much. After his previous experiences with unrequited love, Eiji wonders if Ume, the girl he likes, will feel the same way he does for her. When Eiji accidentally kisses Ume while he is half-asleep, Ume believes that Eiji still has feelings for a past love and begins distancing herself from him. After Ume learns that Eiji will be going to a party with his old friends from high school, she decides to secretly attend with Sawako in hopes of learning more about the girl he had a crush on. She and Sawako are caught spying and are invited join the group, where they meet Sachi Takamura, who rejected Eiji because she loved his friend Yuki instead. Eiji apologizes to Ume for kissing her before she was sure of her feelings and confesses that he likes her and would like her to return his feelings, but they end up fighting because she doubts that he would like someone like her.
3	July 25, 2022	978-4-08-844668-4	October 1, 2024	978-1-9747-4901-0
Episode 9; Episode 10; Episode 11; Final Episode; Bonus Episode
Ume runs away from the gathering, believing herself to be too awful for Eiji to genuinely like; Sawako orders Eiji to give Ume space. As Ume admits that she likes Eiji to Sawako and how she wanted to find the right away to tell her best friend, Sawako tells her that she's been waiting for Ume to confide in her. While she consoles Ume, Sawako tells Ume that instead of worrying over details, she should try to focus on what is important to her. Eiji tells Yuki that since meeting Ume, he's started to become comfortable with remembering his past instead of avoiding it. Ume and Eiji reconcile, admitting their feelings for one another, and become a couple. Though Ume wonders if Sawako and Eiji are her soulmates, she finds happiness in being able to spend time with people she loves.

=== Light novels ===
Kimi ni Todoke has been adapted into two series of light novels in Japan released by Shueisha, one under their Cobalt imprint and one under their newer Mirai Bunko imprint. Sixteen volumes have been released in the Cobalt imprint series; the first was released on August 1, 2007, and the last on December 25, 2015. They were written by Kanae Shimokawa, who also novelized the Nana movie and Yūkan Club.^{[ch. 26:author note#2]} Thirteen volumes of the Mirai Bunko version have been released; the first on March 1, 2011, and the last on June 5, 2015. They were written by Kanako Shirai. Both series were illustrated by the author of the original, Karuho Shiina.

A separate volume, Kimi ni Todoke: Ashita ni Nareba (君に届け ~明日になれば~, Kimi ni Todoke: When Tomorrow Comes), also by Kanae Shimokawa, was released on September 11, 2009. The volume took the place of the manga serialization in Bessatsu Margaret magazine while Karuho Shiina took a break due to her pregnancy in 2009; it contains the story of Kazehaya and Sawako's first meeting, before the events of the manga.

==== Cobalt imprint ====
No.	Japanese release date	Japanese ISBN
1	August 1, 2007	978-4-08-601059-7
2	November 1, 2007	978-4-08-601096-2
3	April 25, 2008	978-4-08-601165-5
4	November 28, 2008	978-4-08-601242-3
5	October 2, 2009	978-4-08-601342-0
6	January 29, 2010	978-4-08-601381-9
7	July 1, 2010	978-4-08-601424-3
8	October 30, 2010	978-4-08-601461-8
9	April 1, 2011	978-4-08-601519-6
10	September 30, 2011	978-4-08-601573-8
11	March 1, 2012	978-4-08-601619-3
12	June 30, 2012	978-4-08-601654-4
13	June 29, 2013	978-4-08-601741-1
14	April 1, 2014	978-4-08-601801-2
15	January 30, 2015	978-4-08-601849-4
16	December 25, 2015	978-4-08-601887-6

==== Mirai Bunko imprint ====
No.	Japanese release date	Japanese ISBN
1	March 1, 2011	978-4-08-321003-7
2	April 5, 2011	978-4-08-321012-9
3	July 5, 2011	978-4-08-321028-0
4	October 5, 2011	978-4-08-321046-4
5	February 3, 2012	978-4-08-321069-3
6	May 2, 2012	978-4-08-321089-1
7	October 5, 2012	978-4-08-321115-7
8	January 4, 2013	978-4-08-321133-1
9	May 2, 2013	978-4-08-321151-5
10	September 5, 2013	978-4-08-321170-6
11	May 2, 2014	978-4-08-321210-9
12	October 3, 2014	978-4-08-321234-5
13	June 5, 2015	978-4-08-321264-2

== See also ==
- List of Kimi ni Todoke characters
