= Manzō Wowari =

Japanese Actor

- Born: January 9, 1948 (age 78); Aichi Prefecture, Japan
- Occupations: Actor, voice actor

Manzō Wowari (をはり 万造, Wowari Manzō; born January 9, 1948) is a Japanese actor and voice actor from Aichi Prefecture.

== Filmography ==
=== Television drama ===
- Shishi no Jidai (1980)
- Tōge no Gunzō (1982), Samurai
- Nobunaga: King of Zipangu (1992)
- Aibō (2006)

=== Television animation ===
- Yakitate!! Japan (2005), Uncle
- Super Robot Taisen OG: Divine Wars (2006), Albert Grey
- Golgo 13 (2008), Senator Wilson
- Himitsu ~The Revelation~ (2008), Hige Guy
- Sōten Kōro (2009), Prisoner

=== Theatrical animation ===
- Kouchuu Ouja Mushiking: Greatest Champion e no Michi (2005)

=== Dubbing ===
==== Live-action ====
- 11.22.63, Al Templeton (Chris Cooper)
- Alphas, Dr. Lee Rosen (David Strathairn)
- Captain America: The First Avenger, Senator Brandt (Michael Brandon)
- Cinderella, Farmer (Paul Hunter)
- ER, Rizzo (Glenn Taranto)
- The Good Wife, Judge Richard Cuesta (David Paymer)
- Harper's Island, Doctor Ike Campbell (Jay Brazeau)
- Hemingway & Gellhorn, John Dos Passos (David Strathairn)
- Iron Man 3, President Matthew Ellis (William Sadler)
- The King's Speech, Prime Minister Neville Chamberlain (Roger Parrott)
- The Lone Ranger, Habberman (Stephen Root)
- Medium, Mr. Dubois (Bruce Gray)
- My Führer – The Really Truest Truth about Adolf Hitler, Adolf Grünbaum (Ulrich Mühe)
- Neruda, Arturo Alessandri (Jaime Vadell)
- Prison Break, Warden Henry Pope (Stacy Keach)
- Rebecca (PDDVD edition), Beatrice's Husband (Nigel Bruce)
- Terminator 2: Judgment Day (2006 Extreme edition), Doctor Peter Silberman (Earl Boen)

==== Animation ====
- Avatar: The Last Airbender (Iroh)
- The Batman (Hugo Strange)
