= Brian Jepson =

American actor

- Born: August 27, 1970 (age 56); Houston, Texas
- Occupations: Voice actor, musician, illustrator
- Notable credits: Guyver: The Bio-Boosted Armor as Agito Makishima/Guyver III; Kagaku Ninja Tai Gatchaman as Joe the Condor/G2; Steam Detectives as Knight Phantom; Wedding Peach as Kazuya Yanagiba/Limone
- Spouse: Courtney

Brian Jepson (born August 27, 1970) is an American voice actor and YouTuber who works for Elephant Productions. He has done voice over work for Tx DOT, PBS, The Lance Armstrong Foundation, ADV Films, Sony Entertainment Online, and Retro Studios. Jepson is a singer/guitar player, graphic designer and stage actor.

== Biography ==
Jepson was born in Houston, Texas.

Jepson attended Sharpstown High School and then The University of Texas at Austin.

Jepson was a member of Austin's Beatles Tribute Band, the Eggmen, for 10 years. The Eggmen won the Austin Chronicle's Music Award for 'Best Cover Band' seven times from 2000 through 2009.

Jepson is a founding member of the Rutles tribute band OUCH!

Jepson is also a member of The Nairobi Trio, an Austin-based band whose original music and stage show is planted firmly between Liverpool and Luckenbach, musically.

Jepson is a graphic designer as well as a veteran stage performer. He is a member of the Austin, TX theater company Onstage Theatre Co.

Jepson is married and lives with his wife and their sons in Austin, in Texas.

Jepson has a wet shaving related YouTube account that goes under the name of SinatraLennon.

== Filmography ==
=== Live Action ===
- Red Winds - Television Narrator

=== Anime ===
- Blade of the Phantom Master - Yuite
- Comic Party Revolution - Manga Artist (ep.12)
- Eden's Bowy - Witto
- Final Fantasy: Unlimited - Oscha
- Gatchaman - Joe The Condor, Capone, Commander Chokula, Dave, Demon 5 Drums, Insect Commander (ep.17), Co-Pilot (ep.47), Goat-Bearded Minion (ep.50), Governor (ep.64), Waiter (ep.96)
- Gatchaman (OVA) - Joe The Condor
- Gatchaman (film) - Joe The Condor
- Getbackers - Sakai
- Guyver: The Bioboosted Armor - Agito Makishima/Guyver III, Purg'Stall, Torii
- Mazinkaiser - Tetsuya Tsurugi
- Project Blue Earth SOS - Prof. Thomas Steamson, Robert
- Pumpkin Scissors - Lionel Taylor, Snubnose, Thin Hoodlum (ep.13)
- Steam Detectives - Knight Phantom
- Wedding Peach - Kazuya Yanagiba/Limone
- Wedding Peach DX - Kazuya Yanagiba/Limone, Golden Mask, Belphegor

=== Video games ===
- DC Universe Online - Felix Faust, Sentinels of Magic/Cultist, Ultra-Humanite, Parallax, Servo, Additional Voices
- Metroid Prime 3: Corruption - Additional Voices
- Wizard 101 - Cyrus Drake, Additional Voices
- Wii Swords - Knight, Pirate
- Pirate101 - Captain Avery, Kobe Yojimbo, Napoleguin, Additional Voices
