= Guyver: The Bioboosted Armor =

Japanese anime television series

強殖装甲ガイバー (Kyōshoku Sōkō Gaibā)
- Genre: Adventure, science fiction
- Anime television series
- Directed by: Katsuhito Akiyama
- Written by: Junki Takegami
- Music by: Hayato Matsuo
- Studio: OLM
- Licensed by: Crunchyroll
- Original network: WOWOW
- English network: NA: Anime Network; UK: Propeller TV; US: Funimation Channel
- Original run: August 6, 2005 – February 18, 2006
- Episodes: 26

Guyver: The Bioboosted Armor (Japanese: 強殖装甲ガイバー, Hepburn: Kyōshoku Sōkō Gaibā) is a Japanese anime series based on the long-running manga series Bio Booster Armor Guyver written by Yoshiki Takaya. It adapts chapters 1-60 (volumes 1–10) of the manga. The production was done in association with ADV Films and Kadokawa Shoten. It is a remake of The Guyver: Bio-Booster Armor, a 12-part OVA that aired in Japan from 1989 until its discontinuation in 1992, having adapted volumes 1–4 and 3/4 of volume 5. The remake is a closer adaptation of the manga and aired from August 6, 2005, to February 18, 2006.

The series aired in North America on December 20, 2010, on the FUNimation Channel.

== Plot ==
The Chronos Corporation has secret plans for the world and have biologically engineered employees and soldiers who are able to transform themselves into powerful monsters at will, beings called Zoanoids. A test type Zoanoid, disguised as a normal man, escapes after stealing a bag containing three items Chronos was studying, known as the Guyver units. Chronos soldiers attempt to recover the units from the test-type but he activates a grenade, killing himself and scattering the Guyver units. One of the lost units is discovered by two high school students, Shō Fukamachi and Tetsurō Segawa. Shō accidentally activates the unit and it merges him with the biological armor, increasing all his physical abilities and arming him with deadly weaponry. He is now a Guyver, later specifically designated "Guyver I."

Determined to recruit Shō or recover the Guyver armor from his body (even if removing it proves fatal,) the Chronos Corporation begins sending Zoanoids after the teenager and his friend Tetsurō. Also at risk is Tetsurō's sister Mizuki, whom Shō loves. The Zoanoid attacks lead to escalating battles that result in Shō learning to be a deadlier warrior while uncovering more of his armor's abilities. Thanks to their influence in politics and new media, the general public is kept unaware of the secret war between the Chronos Corporation and Guyver I. Eventually, Shō meets other Guyver users and uncovers the secrets behind the origins of their units, the Zoanoids, and the Chronos Corporation.

== Characters ==
Most, if not all, of the characters from the original Guyver manga series appear in the new Guyver anime series. Several characters in the new anime series have undergone a slight change of design from their previous looks from the past animated OVA (The Guyver: Bio-Booster Armor) and manga series. For instance, Shō has a different style, brown hair rather than his original black hair. Mizuki now has black hair in the 2005 series instead of her brown hair from the previous series.

=== Main characters ===
Sho Fukamachi (深町 晶, Fukamachi Shō)
Voiced by: Kenji Nojima (Japanese); Chris Patton (English)
The series protagonist. Age 17. Sho was a second-year student at a Tokyo-area high school when he and his best friend, Tetsuro Segawa, stumbled upon one of the missing G-units. Sho inadvertently activates the unit and merges with the bio-boosted armor. Labeled "Guyver I" by the Cronos Corporation, Sho must fend off the advancing swarms of Zoanoids dispatched by the corporation trying to recover the G-unit, while also protecting those close to him.
Tetsurō Segawa (瀬川 哲郎, Segawa Tetsurō)
Voiced by: Kōsuke Takeuchi (Japanese); Lowell Bartholomee (English)
Sho's closest friend. A third-year student attending the same school as Sho. Tetsuro is a science fiction fan and the president of the school's Sci-Fi society club, which gives him some knowledge to make quite a few assumptions about the things involving the Guyver.
Mizuki Segawa (瀬川 瑞紀, Segawa Mizuki)
Voiced by: Nana Mizuki (Japanese); Luci Christian (English)
Sho's romantic interest and Tetsuro's younger sister. She is an average high school girl attending the same school as Shō and her brother. Initially infatuated with Agito Makishima, Mizuki starts to develop feelings for Shō after realizing she can't compete with Shizu's loyalty and devotion to Agito, and knowing the truth behind the Guyvers. By the later episodes of the anime, her affections have completely shifted towards him.
Agito Makishima (巻島 顎人, Makishima Agito)
Voiced by: Katsuyuki Konishi (Japanese); Brian Jepson (English)
Agito is a third-year student at the same high school the others attend. He almost never allows sentiment to stand in his way. He does not even show much expression in his face, but acts quite friendly at school. He finds a Guyver unit and merges with it to become "Guyver III." Agito also seems to have extensive knowledge on the Guyver and its abilities and exhibits them quite well. Agito seems to have his own agenda when it comes to dealing with Chronos. He is an excellent example of an anti-hero. His loyal childhood friend is Shizu.

Guyver The Bioboosted Armor Commercial Banner

Natsuki Taga (多賀なつき, Taga Natsuki)
Voiced by: Tomo Adachi (Japanese); Kira Vincent-Davis (English)
A high school girl that attends the same school as Shō and his friends. She is also a close friend to Shō and the Segawa siblings. She becomes of great help to them later when they are forced into hiding after the apparent deaths of Sho, Agito, and Masaki.
Richart Guyot (リヒャルト・ギュオー, Riharuto Gyuō)
Voiced by: Kinryu Arimoto (Japanese); Bill Wise (English)
Guyot is tall, powerfully built man. In the beginning of the series, he acted as the commander of Chronos Japan branch after Agito Makishima's foster father, Genzo Makishima, failed to retrieve the Guyver units. He has an immensely commanding presence.
Masaki Murakami (村上征樹, Murakami Masaki)
Voiced by: Mitsuaki Madono (Japanese); Andrew Love (English)
Masaki was a freelance journalist captured by Cronos and used as a guinea pig in the Zoalord development program. He is a tall, thin young man with shoulder-length hair, and normally wears sunglasses, even at night. He joins with Shō to fight Cronos, having his own revenge in mind. He does not quite trust Agito at first because of Guyver III's earlier connections with Chronos.

=== Other characters ===
Fumio Fukamachi
Voiced by: Hironori Miyata (Japanese); John Swasey (English)
Shō Fukamachi's Father, aged 47.
Genzo Makishima
Voiced by: Kenichi Ogata (Japanese); Brando Austin (English)
Agito Makishima's foster father and ex-Head of Chronos Japan, who becomes the first Enzyme.
Oswald A. Lisker
Voiced by: Unshō Ishizuka (Japanese); Jason Douglas (English)
An inspector from Chronos Headquarters. He is "Guyver II."
Aptom
Voiced by: Tetsu Inada (Japanese); Robert Kraft (English)
One of the Chronos "Lost Number Commandos" an elite group of Zoanoids that failed the Zoanoid optimization process. The Lost Numbers are used as expendable guinea pigs for Chronos genetic research. Aptom has the unique ability of mimicry, allowing him to recreate the abilities of other Zoanoids. As the series progresses, he receives an upgrade to his ability allowing him to enhance and combine zoanoids into more powerful hybrid creatures. The penalty (or perhaps benefit) of this process is that it renders him immune to the mental domination of the Chronos leaders.
Toshiaki Hayami/Bio-Freezer
Voiced by: Takeharu Onishi (Japanese); Illich Guardiola (English)
Hamilcar Barcas
Voiced by: Saburo Kamei (Japanese); Charles C. Campbell (English)
Archanfel
Voiced by: Yasunori Matsumoto (Japanese); Gray Haddock (English)
Sin Rubeo Amniculus
Voiced by: Dai Matsumoto (Japanese); John Gremillion (English)
Fried'rich von Purg'stall
Voiced by: Hiroshi Tsuchida (Japanese); Brian Jepson (English)
Luggnagg de Krumeggnic
Voiced by: Tomohisa Asō (Japanese); Romulus Venicito (English)
Jabir Ibn Hayyan, Gregole
Voiced by: Yoshinori Sonobe (Japanese); John Gremillion (English)
Gaster
Voiced by: Yoshinori Sonobe (Japanese); Josh Grelle (English)
Lǐ Yǎn-Tuí, Derzerb, Enzyme II
Voiced by: Go Shinomiya (Japanese); Rhelik Shadowbriar (English)
Zerbebuth
Voiced by: Kenta Miyake (Japanese); Jim McClellan (English)
Elegan
Voiced by: Kōichi Tōchika (Japanese); Mark X. Laskowski (English)
ZX-Tole
Voiced by: Tomoyuki Shimura (Japanese); Adam Dudley (English)
Test Type
Voiced by: Yoshitaka Hirano (Japanese); John Swasey (English)
Kawada
Voiced by: Aamir Hydrai
Kobashi
Voiced by: Blake Shepard
Misuzawa
Voiced by: Mariela Ortiz
Dyme
Voiced by: Wendel Calvert
One of the Chronos "Lost Number Commandos" an elite group of Zoanoids that failed the Zoanoid optimization process. Dyme has the unique ability to bond with the surrounding elements, allowing him to control the battlefield during an encounter.

== Theme songs ==
- Opening THEME - "Waiting for" - Reiri (Líng-Lì Yáng)
- Ending THEME - "Cotton Candy" - Bonnie Pink
