= Saburo Kamei =

Japanese voice actor

- Born: April 3, 1938
- Died: September 9, 2013 (aged 75)
- Occupation: Voice actor

Saburo Kamei (亀井 三郎, Kamei Saburō; April 3, 1938 – September 9, 2013) was a Japanese voice actor who worked for 81 Produce.

== Voice roles ==
- Batman: The Animated Series (Rupert Thorne)
- City Hunter (Mohammed (ep.2))
- Detective Conan: Crossroad in the Ancient Capital (Seizo Sakura)
- Fist of the North Star (Dragon, Katoujutsu Commander)
- Guyver: The Bioboosted Armor (Hamilcar Barcas)
- Legend of the Galactic Heroes (Glaeser (ep. 44))
- Mobile Fighter G Gundam (Keiun)
- Planetes (managing director (ep.8))
- Starship Operators (Truman (ep.13))
- Texhnolyze (Keitarou Mizuno)
