= Takuma Suzuki =

Japanese voice actor (born 1961)

- Born: December 7, 1961 (age 64); Tokyo, Japan
- Occupation: Voice actor
- Years active: 1990-present
- Height: 171 cm (5 ft 7 in)

Takuma Suzuki (鈴木 琢磨, Suzuki Takuma; born December 7, 1961 in Tokyo) is a Japanese voice actor who is affiliated with 81 Produce.

== Selected voice roles ==
- Major Leads are in **Bold**.

=== Anime television series ===
- Daa! Daa! Daa! – **Yuu Kouzuki**
- Cromartie High School – Shinjiro Hayashida
- Digimon Adventure – Vadermon
- Guyver: The Bioboosted Armor – Officer Tanaka
- Hyper Police – Fukusuke (episode 9), Lizard C (episode 5), Mogura Otoko, Monster (episode 7), Nupu, Skeleton (episode 6), Tako Otoko (episode 12)
- I Love Bubu Chacha – **Dad**
- Inuyasha – Tsukuyomaru (Episode 74)
- Kimi ni Todoke – Yoshiyuki "Zen" Arai
- MegaMan NT Warrior – Seiji Hikawa; Sharkman
- Miru: Paths to My Future – Sato
- Gensomaden Saiyuki – Fake Sanzo
- Naruto – Dan Kato
- Naruto Shippuden – Tofu, Dan Kato
- One Piece – Hockera (episodes 326–335), **Minchey** (episodes 136–138)
- One-Punch Man – Fukegao (Episode 1)
- Pokémon – Hirata (Episode 62)
- X – Fisherman (Episode 10)
- Parasyte – Mamoru Uda, Hirama
- Hunter × Hunter – Assassin B, Bombardier Beetle, Centipede, Coburn, Dwun, Ginta, Hishita, Kattsuo, Katzo, arcos, Saccho Kobayakawa, Squala, Togari
- Delicious Party Pretty Cure - CooKing

=== Anime OVA ===
- Gestalt
- Kikaider – **Blue Hakaider**

=== Drama CD ===
- Weiß kreuz Wish A Dream Collection II A four-leaf clover – Ito

=== Games ===
- Final Fantasy X – High Summoner Braska, Maechen
- Final Fantasy X-2 – Maechen

=== Dubbing roles ===
==== Live-action films ====
- Back to the Future (2014 BS Tokyo edition) – Sam Baines (George DiCenzo)
- Flipper
- Hellboy – Trevor Bruttenholm (Ian McShane)
- Jungle Cruise – Sir James Hobbs-Coddington (Andy Nyman)
- North Face (2020 BS Tokyo edition) – Willy Angerer (Simon Schwarz)

==== Live-action television ====
- Barney & Friends – **Barney the Dinosaur** (replacing Bob West's voice)
- Murdoch Mysteries
- Snow Fox – Chén Jiāluò
- The Pacific – Stern medic

==== Television animation ====
- Biker Mice from Mars – Suite, George
- Bob the Builder – **Bob the Builder**
- Donkey Kong Country – Cutlass
- Insektors
- Teenage Mutant Ninja Turtles – Zach, Walt, Fietz (TV Tokyo Edition)
- The Catillac Cats – Wordsworth
- X-Men – Multiple Man (TV Tokyo Edition)

==== Tokusatsu ====
- B-Robo Kabutack (1997) - Star Mind S (ep. 1–2)
- Denji Sentai Megaranger (1997) - Bee Nezire (ep. 7)
