= List of Pani Poni Dash! episodes =

This article lists the episodes from the anime series Pani Poni Dash! which aired in Japan on TV Tokyo between July 4, 2005, and December 26, 2005. It mainly follows child prodigy Rebecca Miyamoto, an MIT graduate newly hired as a homeroom teacher at Peach Moon Academy, where she deals with the antics of the Class 1-C students during everyday school life. Each episode ends with a still image drawn by Japanese illustrators of anime, manga, and visual novels; these are listed below as endcards. The anime has since been licensed by United States based company Funimation in North America and ADV Films in the United Kingdom. King Records subsidiary Starchild has the video and music rights for the anime. A special OVA was released with DVD box set containing the anime series, on April 15, 2009. Funimation released a complete DVD box set on March 10, 2009. On October 26, 2010, Funimation re-released the complete series as a part of their Super Amazing Value Edition line-up.

The series was directed by Akiyuki Shinbo and Shin Oonuma at Shaft. Kenichi Kanemaki was the series composition writer, Kei Haneoka composed the music, and Kazuhiro Oota designed the characters and acted as chief animation director. A number of episodes were outsourced outside of Shaft: episodes 2, 5, 9, 13, 17, and 21 to Chaos Project; episodes 3 and 11 to No Side; episodes 4, 10, 15, 20, and 25 to Studio Pastoral; episodes 7 and 12 to Studio Tama; and episodes 18 and 23 to Mushi Production. (Note: All outsourcing studios credited as Production Assistance (制作協力) in the credits to their respective episodes.)

== Episode list ==
| No. | Title | Directed by (Note: Information is taken from the ending credits of each episode.) | Written by | Storyboarded by | Original release date |
|---|---|---|---|---|---|
| 1 | "Summerwear in the Coldest Season, Winterwear in the Hottest Season"; Transliteration: "Kan ni Katabira, Doyō ni Nunoko" (Japanese: 寒に帷子 土用に布子) | Shin Oonuma | Kenichi Kanemaki | Michio Fukuda | July 4, 2005 |
When the Class 1-C teacher unexpectedly quits, Class 1-D teacher Old Geezer informs the Class 1-C students that a replacement has been found. Meanwhile, eleven-year-old MIT graduate Rebecca Miyamoto runs late for her first day as the new homeroom teacher, traveling to Peach Moon Academy with her bunny companion Mesousa. Mature student Rei Tachibana struggles with what Rebecca should be nicknamed, especially since her classmates are not helpful. When Rebecca finally arrives at the school, the Class 1-C students unanimously decide to call her "Becky". After being bombarded with random questions, Rebecca is eventually humiliated by Rei, causing Rebecca to crouch behind a curtain. Feeling stressed out, Rebecca winds down at the school rooftop before returning to the classroom. After energetic student Himeko Katagiri is glad that Rebecca plans to stay, Rebecca quickly does roll call. Having been ignored by everyone, Mesousa hides out in a rabbit hutch, but he is satisfied when class representative Ichijō gives him sweet rice dumplings.
| 2 | "A Safflower Stands Out in Any Garden"; Transliteration: "Kurenai wa Sonō ni Haete mo Kakure-nashi" (Japanese: 紅は園生に映えても隠れなし) | Yuji Moriyama | Kenichi Kanemaki | Yuji Moriyama | July 11, 2005 |
Rebecca has trouble memorizing the names of the Class 1-C students, so she refers to them by derogatory nicknames, such as "Bookworm" for Miyako Uehara or "Cowlick" for Himeko. Mesousa finds the mysterious Lord Cat inside a vending machine. In the faculty room, Rebecca talks with Class 1-A teacher Miyuki Igarashi and Class 1-B teacher Saotome. After being described as boring, Kurumi Momose falls into depression and hides out in the rabbit hutch. In the drama club annex costume storage room, Ichijō requests help from identical twins Yūma and Yūna Kashiwagi. Despite apologizing to Kurumi for calling her a boring girl, Rebecca is unable to call Kurumi by her real name. Ichijō suddenly brings in Mesousa, who is dressed like Kurumi. In Class 1-D, Misao Nanjō brings in various pets, though Old Geezer tries to ignore this disruptive environment. A female robot named Roboko enrolls as a transfer student in Class 1-C, though she turns out to be Akane Serizawa in a robot costume. Kurumi has a newfound hope when Rebecca calls her by her real name, but it is short-lived when Kurumi overhears Rebecca, Miyuki and Saotome in the faculty room.
| 3 | "It's Always Harder On the Ones Who Have to Watch"; Transliteration: "Yamu Mi Yori Miru Me" (Japanese: 病む身より見る目) | Yoshihisa Matsumoto | Kenichi Kanemaki | Yoshihisa Matsumoto | July 18, 2005 |
Introduced as a member of the intelligence department of the student council, Hibiki Watanuki goes undercover behind the chalkboard in order to find the latest scoop about Rebecca. Himeko is overjoyed when Rebecca arrives in the classroom with a cowlick of her own. Annoyed by Himeko's overactive nature, Rebecca rips off Himeko's cowlick, depleting Himeko of her energy. In the faculty room, Miyuki is revealed to be alcoholic as she fixes Rebecca's hair, while Saotome stores Himeko's cowlick inside Rebecca's desk drawer. Himeko's cowlick is transported onto the spaceship of the Aliens, who then lose track of it. Rebecca notices Himeko acting sluggish during Saotome's physical education class. Later on, Rei and Sayaka Suzuki realize that Rebecca misplaced Himeko's cowlick. Rebecca decides to create an artificial cowlick behind closed doors. Suzune Shiratori pokes fun at the short stature of her best friend Otome Akiyama. After failing to get a beverage from the vending machine, Mesousa is briefly bullied by Yankee before Rebecca finds him outside on a tree. Rebecca uses Mesousa as a guinea pig to test samples of the artificial cowlick. The next day, Rebecca gives Himeko a working artificial cowlick, which restores Himeko's energy.
| 4 | "Don't Count Your Chickens Before They Hatch"; Transliteration: "Seiten o Homeru ni wa Nichibotsu o Mate" (Japanese: 晴天をほめるには日没を待て) | Yasuo Ejima | Katsuhiko Takayama | Osamu Tadokoro | July 25, 2005 |
At the end of class, Rebecca announces that the Class 1-C students will have a test tomorrow, while Miyuki announces the same thing for the Class 1-A students. Miyako is the only student who perpetually studies. Rebecca decides to chaperone the Class 1-C students for a study session in the nearby school lodge clubroom, but they treat it like a slumber party. Yuzuko Kurusu, Yūma and Yūna invite themselves as well. Rei advises Himeko to think of studying like manga. Kurumi shows long dice made from pencils, but there are many flaws of using them to cheat on a test. Rebecca informs that animal figurines, including that of the Brazilian horned frog, were painted in China. The girls decide to cool off at the spa and sauna, where Kurumi admires Rei's curvy figure. Before going to bed, Ichijō advises Rei to cuddle Mesousa since Rei cannot sleep without a stuffed animal. The next morning, Miyako is upset that she could not study for the test. She is further irritated when Ichijō gives the other girls a pair of eyeglasses to look like Miyako.
| 5 | "It is a Treasure If It Is Fulfilling"; Transliteration: "Yō ni Kanae ba Takara nari" (Japanese: 用に叶えば宝なり) | Tooru Yoshida | Kenichi Kanemaki | Katsumi Terahigashi | August 1, 2005 |
The freshman students and teachers from the four classes go on a field trip to a campsite. Although she organized a raffle to split the others into smaller groups, Kurumi forgot to include herself in the raffle. Kurumi ends up joining a group with Rebecca and Mesousa, while Ichijō brings in the gloomy Giant Salamander as a fourth member. Misao helps Tsurugi Inugami catch a fish at the river, but they only reel in Akane wearing a kappa costume. While Rei prepares to cook Chinese cuisine, she sends Miyako to collect firewood. Miyako is startled when a missile launches from the forest into outer space, where it nearly hits the spaceship of the Aliens. Rebecca, Kurumi, Mesousa and Giant Salamander end up collecting firewood for Rei. Yuzuko and Akira Miyata are caught between finding a missile for Miyako and a kappa for Akane. Instead, Ichijō brings them deeper in the forest, where a group of kappas are polishing a missile. During dinnertime, Rei showcases a new dish, implied to be made from the meat of Giant Salamander. At night, everyone gathers around a bonfire.
| 6 | "Poking a Bush Only Lures Snakes"; Transliteration: "Yabu o Tsutsuite Hebi o Dasu" (Japanese: 藪をつついて蛇を出す) | Tatsuya Oishi | Kenichi Kanemaki | Tatsuya Oishi | August 8, 2005 |
Rebecca is granted a vacant space that will be renovated as a research room used as a hideout. Lord Cat is transported to the spaceship of the Aliens. While dressed as Suzune, Mesousa performs poorly during Saotome's physical education class. As it begins to rain, Rebecca and the Class 1-C students enter the old school building in order to visit the vacant space, but they are forced to nail shut a mysterious ceiling door. While playing dodgeball, Suzume teases Otome by aiming a ball at her even though they are on the same team. The Alien Subordinate shockingly sees a hand rotate Earth, but the Alien Captain is in disbelief. One week later, Rebecca finishes renovating the research room. Ichijō and Kurumi treat it like a counseling room because Rei wrote a sign on the door. Giant Salamander stands in for Hibiki during class, while Hibiki investigates the ceiling door in the research room. Yūna and Akira each share their insignificant problems to Rebecca. Rei, Himeko and Miyako later come by to hang out with Rebecca in the research room.
| 7 | "Good and Bad Luck Are Decided by the Person, Not the Calendar"; Transliteration: "Kikkyō wa Hito ni Yori te Hi ni Yorazu" (Japanese: 吉凶は人によりて日によらず) | Takuji Kimura | Kenichi Kanemaki | Shin Oonuma | August 15, 2005 |
After losing at rock paper scissors against Miyuki, Saotome and Old Geezer, Rebecca is forced to have the Class 1-C students clean the school swimming pool, but the Class 1-C students punish Rebecca for not helping them. Tsurugi encounters Ichijō's little sister wandering around, so Tsurugi prepares to look for Ichijō. However, Tsuguri and Ichijō's little sister are interrupted by Misao showcasing more of her pets. When Akane, Behoimi and Akira put on a show respectively as a moss monster, a magical girl and an assistant, they end up cleaning the school swimming pool instead. Two minutes ago, the Aliens transported Ichijō's little sister on their spaceship, but they return her to Earth as a giantess. In the present, Ichijō encourages Mesousa to figure out a way to revert Ichijō's little sister to normal size. Instead, the Aliens manage to fix the issue by erasing the event from the timeline. Ichijō's little sister draws interpretive yet offensive portraits of Rebecca, Kurumi and Himeko. After the school swimming pool is cleaned, Misao's pet alligator saves Rebecca from drowning. Mesousa encounters Lord Cat, who returned from outer space in a vending machine.
| 8 | "Bear with Sanshō Spice Is Like Carp with Pepper"; Transliteration: "Kuma ni Sanshō, Koi ni Koshō" (Japanese: 熊に山椒 鯉に胡椒) | Shin Oonuma | Kenichi Kanemaki | Osamu Tadokoro | August 22, 2005 |
Feeling that her persona as a magical girl is no longer unique, Behoimi puts on a fashion show, but Mesousa along with Yūma and Yūna disagree with Behoimi's new costume ideas. Behoimi uses various gadgets to equip her in finding lost items for the other students, but the gadgets are not really useful. Later on, Rebecca notices that Behoimi never uses real magic due to the fear of returning to a magical kingdom. The Class 1-C students decide to draw a magic circle in hopes of summoning real magic to Behoimi's magic wand, but it goes out of control due to Mesousa's bad luck. The next day, Lord Cat and Yankee leave a used cigarette in the rabbit hutch, which accidentally starts a fire. After Saotome rescues a litter of baby rabbits from the burning rabbit hutch, he informs that Giant Salamander is still trapped inside. Behoimi rushes in to save Giant Salamander as rain magically falls from the sky, though Ichijō actually performed a rain dance. A rainbow appears in the sky as false proof that Behoimi's magic exists. Behoimi starts going to school in a schoolgirl outfit rather than a magical girl costume.
| 9 | "There Are Eight-Year-Old Sages and 100-Year-Old Kids"; Transliteration: "Hassai no Okina, Hyaku-sai no Warabe" (Japanese: 八歳の翁 百歳の童) | HIroshi Ishiodori | Kenichi Kanemaki | Yukihiro Matsushita (Note: Credited as Yukihiro.) | August 29, 2005 |
During summer vacation, Rebecca is escorted by Media, the assistant of the Professor, to Okinodoku Island, where an archaeological excavation will be conducted. Surprisingly, the Class 1-C students were invited as well. Media takes Rebecca and the Class 1-C students to a tree, where several clones of Mesousa are seen. Tasked with determining which clone of Mesousa is the genuine article, Rebecca settles for a bunny with the red scarf that obviously stands out from the rest of the clones. Rebecca and the Class 1-C students are brought inside a cave, where they fall into a bottomless swamp that somehow takes them to Brazil. Back inside the cave, Rebecca and the Class 1-C students eat mammoth meat with the Professor and Media. According to a photo album of when Rebecca studied at MIT, she was introverted and emotionless until the Professor told her a story about a rich elephant advising a poor mouse to work hard. At the end of the archaeological excavation, the Professor believes that Rebecca made the right choice of becoming a high school teacher. As the second semester begins, Media enrolls as a transfer student in Class 1-D, which Behoimi seems to dislike.
| 10 | "Even a Thoroughbred Has Its Habits"; Transliteration: "Meiba ni Kuse ari" (Japanese: 名馬に癖あり) | Yasuo Ejima | Katsuhiko Takayama | Michio Fukuda | September 5, 2005 |
The bunny with the red scarf reverts back to Mesousa after Rebecca throws him into the rabbit hutch. The Class 1-C students individually present their summer projects. Kurumi kept a boring growth record of morning glories, while Ichijō made a creepy friend out of a soda can. Meanwhile, Behoimi and Media set aside their checkered past before locating and collecting several pipe bombs inside a storage room. Sayaka kept a journal about the short life of a pink chick. Behoimi and Media have trouble disarming the pipe bombs. In Class 1-A, Yūma and Yūna showcase the latest fall fashion, though they drag Behoimi into wearing her magical girl costume. Miyako presents a flashy scale model of Kinkaku-ji. While in a robot costume, Akane realizes that Ichijō is a cyborg. Himeko has Giant Salamander present an eco-friendly scale model of the Kawanishi H8K. Thanks to a night-vision device, Behoimi and Media have one more pipe bomb to disarm, but Rebecca barges into the storage room and haphazardly picks up the pipe bomb, accidentally activating it. When Rebecca needs to use the restroom, she gives the pipe bomb to Mesousa, though Behoimi and Media never actually disarm it.
| 11 | "Inscrutable Are the Ways of Heaven"; Transliteration: "Ningen Banji, Saiō ga Uma" (Japanese: 人間万事 塞翁が馬) | Takuo Suzuki | Kenichi Kanemaki | Michio Fukuda | September 12, 2005 |
Himeko, Rei, Ichijō and Kurumi play badminton together outside, though the fun ends when Ichijō erects a tornado that creates a large pit. Rebecca notices Sayaka running small errands for the other girls, including a crossword puzzle for Himeko, an eraser for Kurumi, some flashcards for Rei and cup of miso soup for Ichijō. After spotting Sayaka in a British racing green MG Midget convertible with an unknown figure, Media informs Himeko, Rei, Ichijō, Miyako, Kurumi and even Misao about it on the following day. Sayaka neither confirms nor denies that she has a boyfriend. After a disruptive class, Rebecca summons Himeko, Rei, Ichijō, Miyako and Kurumi to the research room, where Rebecca learns that Sayaka might be in love with someone. When Rei theorizes that the convertible belongs to a teacher, Rebecca soon learns that it might belong to Old Geezer. Rebecca later endures a wild ride as Old Geezer drives the convertible, though it is revealed that the convertible actually belongs to Miyuki. Sayaka clears up the misunderstanding by saying that she just admires Miyuki.
| 12 | "There Are No Classes Among Humans, But There Are In Humans' Hearts"; Transliteration: "Hito ni Kōge Nashi, Kokoro ni Kōge Ari" (Japanese: 人に高下なし, 心に高下あり) | Hiroaki Nishimura | Katsuhiko Takayama | Shouji Saeki | September 19, 2005 |
Old Geezer catches Akira sleep-talking in Class 1-D, while Rebecca catches Himeko sleep-talking in Class 1-C. The Class 1-C students bring up dreams as the topic of discussion after it is discovered that Rebecca does not have any dreams. Meanwhile, the Aliens acquire a rather invasive mind-reading device. They aim the mind-reading device at Rebecca, but it backfires when it targets Himeko instead. Rebecca, Rei, Ichijō, Miyako, Kurumi, Sayaka and Mesousa find themselves inside Himeko's dream world. They come across the self-proclaimed archangel Michael, who challenges them to a battle of wits in order for them to gain access behind a closed door if they win. After they lose, they chance upon a restaurant, where Kurumi's twin brother Shū Momose serves them imitation crab meat. Upon finding the closed door, they find out that Himeko retains a childlike heart before a bothersome Michael shows up again. Moreover, it is realized that they can manifest their impossible wishes, allowing them to finally defeat Michael. At sunset, they return to reality after managing to wake up Himeko by pinching her face. Rebecca concludes that she does not need to have a dream if her everyday life is rewarding.
| 13 | "The Wages of Sin Come Like the Tip of a Needle"; Transliteration: "Aku no Mukui wa Hari no Saki" (Japanese: 悪の報いは針の尖) | Yuji Moriyama | Kenichi Kanemaki | Yuji Moriyama | September 26, 2005 |
On the day of a supplementary class deep into the fall season, Rebecca is unexpectedly challenged by the All Japan Banchō Association to a fight. To make matters worse, Ichijō fails to convince the guardian god Ichiban Fujiyama to withdraw, while Akane fails to smooth things over after she is forcefully sent out as a cow ambassador. The young female ninja Ogin and the animal commander Hirosuke both raid the school, but the students manage to evade them. At the base of operations of the intelligence department, Hibiki informs Rebecca and Rei that Hirosuke is fond of Suzune. In the school hallway, Suzune defeats Hiroshi while Ichijō subdues Ogin, but Ogin activates Ichiban, who begins destroying the school. Rebecca and the students are suddenly transported to the principal's underground lair, where Rebecca receives a key to a mecha that bears a resemblance to the Aliens and is capable of bringing Ichiban to the ground. The next day, the school is restored. Rei and Miyako belittle Kurumi when she dresses like a detective from a tokusatsu film, causing Kurumi to hide out in the rabbit hutch. The supplementary class resumes, but Ichijō treats Ogin as her lackey.
| 14 | "Hugging a Stone and Jumping into an Abyss"; Transliteration: "Ishi o Daite Fuchi ni Hairu" (Japanese: 石を抱いて淵に入る) | Hiroto Katou | Kenichi Kanemaki | Kazuki Tsunoda | October 3, 2005 |
Rebecca is dismayed upon learning that both the principal and the cafeteria chef are out of town on business. After managing to receive some food from the Class 1-C students, Rebecca realizes that Shū makes Kurumi's packed lunch everyday. On the school rooftop, Shū kindly gives an extra packed lunch to Tsurugi. Kurumi brings Rebecca to the school rooftop, where Rebecca orders Shū to make her packed lunches. The next day, Shū cooks a special lunch for Rebecca. Ichijō captures the cute Raccoon Dog for a potential meal as a supposed source of collagen. The Raccoon Dog is liberated when she has the ability to talk. She also demonstrates her ability to partially transform though retain her face, using Kurumi as an example. The following day, Rei encourages Shū to skip class, forcing Rebecca to make her own lunch while the Class 1-C students watch nearby. Surprisingly, the Raccoon Dog is only able to fully transform into Behoimi. As Rebecca struggles in the kitchen, Rei has a change of heart and offers to help after previously refusing to do so. Himeko, Ichijō, Miyako, Kurumi and Sayaka then contribute to preparing a special lunch for Rebecca.
| 15 | "Endure Patiently and You Will Not Wilt"; Transliteration: "Kennin Fubatsu" (Japanese: 堅忍不抜) | Yasuo Ejima | Sumio Uetake | Yasuo Ejima | October 10, 2005 |
The freshman students and teachers from the four classes go on a school excursion, but life hangs in the balance as the Class 1-C bus ends up suspended from the edge of a cliff. The Aliens recall that the Class 1-C bus was taken hostage by a hijacker, though Rebecca scolded him and Ichijō captured him. A parody of various retro video games illustrates the current predicament of the Class 1-C bus. As the other classes return from the school excursion, Mesousa hears from Old Geezer that the Class 1-C bus has not returned yet. Rebecca remotely summons a robot rabbit to come to her aid, but it ultimately runs around in circles. Miyako's forehead causes a fire, but it is somehow stopped by Ichijō. When Himeko gets hungry, Ichijō tosses a treat in Himeko's direction three times, but it gets taken by Rei, Miyako and Sayaka. The Aliens observe as they allow Ichijō's little sister to ward off a giant crab. As Rebecca urges the Class 1-C students to hang in there and keep their hopes up, the Class 1-C bus eventually drops into the sea below, though Rebecca notes that everyone was rescued afterwards.
| 16 | "Adversity Makes a Man Wise"; Transliteration: "Hisoka naru Yori Akiraka naru wa Nashi" (Japanese: 微かなるより顕かなるはなし) | Shin Oonuma | Kenichi Kanemaki | Michio Fukuda | October 17, 2005 |
After school in the research room, Rebecca informs Himeko, Rei, Miyako, Kurumi and Sayaka that Ichijō has been doing strange things for the past few days. Hibiki, Yuzuko and Akira witnessed Ichijō shedding tears as she went window shopping for a wedding dress, assumably allured by forbidden love. During a stakeout, Yuzuko and Akira are scared off by Ichijō, who ultimately finds out that she was being spied on. In the style of a gal game, Rebecca, Himeko, Rei, Miyako, Kurumi and Sayaka split up in pursuit, but Ichijō sets up various traps to mislead them. When Ichijō ends up cornered, she is picked up by the Alien Captain disguised as an MIB agent named Bruce in a limo. Riding in a black helicopter, Rebecca, Himeko, Rei, Miyako, Kurumi, Sayaka, Mesousa and Giant Salamander chase after the limo, which seemingly explodes after driving off a cliff. Ichijō and the Alien Captain are recovered onto the spaceship in a simulated field of lilacs, where they say their farewells before she gives him a dried herring as a parting gift. Ichijō returns to Earth, having survived from the wreckage. She secretly gains closure as she looks out to sea.
| 17 | "The Way to Heaven Does Not Favor Anyone"; Transliteration: "Tendō wa Shin Nashi" (Japanese: 天道は親なし) | Tooru Yoshida | Katsuhiko Takayama | Osamu Tadokoro | October 24, 2005 |
With the school festival taking place in one week, Rebecca and the Class 1-C students brainstorm the theme of their classroom. In an effort to lower costs and increase profits for a potential food stand, Rei showcases her homemade cake samples and spray-painted male chicks. On the day of the school festival, Rebecca and the Class 1-C students dress up in maid outfits as the theme of their classroom is a maid café, which turns out to be a huge success. Originally having misgivings about the school festival, Rebecca decides to inspect the other classrooms. The Class 1-B classroom is a haunted house, while the Class 1-D classroom is a jungle. The Aliens are surprised when Zula dresses up in their likeness, while Ichijō's little sister is also aware of what they look like. Rebecca visits other classrooms with various themes. The Class 1-C students are dismayed upon learning from Miyuki and Saotome that all profits are donated to charity. Rebecca admits to the Class 1-C students that she had a blast during the school festival.
| 18 | "Good Things Come to He Who Waits"; Transliteration: "Kahō wa Nete Mate" (Japanese: 果報は寝て待て) | Otoko Odawara | Kenichi Kanemaki | Hiroaki Nishimura | October 31, 2005 |
At a playground, a jinx trainee named Taeko begs Mesousa to become unhappy. In the research room, Rebecca, Behoimi and Media later learn that Mesousa has a time bomb shaped like an analog clock implanted on his forehead, originally set to detonate in seven days until Media somehow reduces the time to three hours. Media flings Mesousa into the sky, a spectacle witnessed by Himeko and Miyako. Mesousa lands in a river, where he unintentionally scares off Hibiki, Yuzuko and Akira. Upon realizing that Taeko attached the time bomb on his forehead, Mesousa searches for her across town. He encounters Misao walking her pet iguana on a leash and Rei wearing her Chinese restaurant delivery attire. Mesousa receives no help from Ichijō and is ignored by Suzune and Otome. After being ridiculed by Yūma and Yūna, Mesousa finally finds Taeko in a coffee shop, thanks to Kurumi and Sayaka. Rebecca, Behoimi and Media eventually figure out how to disarm the time bomb after using Akane in a bunny costume as a guinea pig. Despite the celebration, the time bomb is never actually disarmed, and it is revealed that Lord Cat gave the time bomb to Taeko in the first place.
| 19 | "Art Causes Harm to the Body"; Transliteration: "Gei ga Mi no Ada" (Japanese: 芸が身の仇) | Takuji Kimura | Sumio Uetake | Michio Fukuda | November 7, 2005 |
Rebecca informs the Class 1-D students that the Class 1-C students have been quarantined and isolated in an undisclosed location after being infected with a virus. Since none of the Class 1-D students have been infected, Rebecca scrambles to find a solution upon learning that the virus might be undetectable and can reproduce itself by eating endorphins. The Class 1-C students hope that Rebecca will show up with a vaccine, but they are shocked when Old Geezer is also infected with the virus. After believing that animals can transmit the virus, Rebecca detains Misao's pet green chick. The Raccoon Dog partially transforms into Akane when the latter suspects the former of being the virus carrier. Akira feels targeted when Rebecca points out that the virus carrier might be the most innocent person in the classroom. An argument sparks between the sanitation of Akane's costumes and Misao's pets. The Class 1-D students speculate that Rebecca might be the virus carrier until a tied up Mesousa ceases the ruckus. The Class 1-C students return to school the next day, though the virus carrier is revealed to be Ichijō, unbeknownst to the others.
| 20 | "A Wise Man Will Know When to Approach Danger"; Transliteration: "Kunshi Ayauki ni Chikayorazu" (Japanese: 君子危うきに近よらず) | Yasuo Ejima | Kenichi Kanemaki | Kazuki Tsunoda | November 14, 2005 |
Akane and Yuzuko, the respective members of the drama club and the film club, find themselves entangled in an ongoing war. Himeko detects the smell of crab fried rice on Rei's body, but Ichijō uses a robotic hand to electrocute Himeko, who is consequently sent to the school infirmary. Since her quarantine and isolation during the previous week, Himeko's cowlick has been replaced with a mushroom. Himeko exhibits the fear of children upon seeing Rebecca in a cat costume. It is believed that Himeko's personality has altered. In the school hallway, Ichijō has Rebecca sit on top of Misao's pet elephant, while Tsurugi anticipates the narrow space. On the school rooftop, Himeko later plans to achieve world domination. In the school cafeteria, Rei, Miyako, Kurumi and Sayaka confirm that the mushroom is an invading extraterrestrial parasite. After Himeko is captured by her classmates, the mushroom prepares to release its spores. Rebecca uses Ichijō's robotic hand to electrocute Himeko, causing the mushroom to detach from Himeko's head. The Aliens send a wayward blast towards the school and destroy the mushroom, thereby saving Earth. Himeko thankfully returns to normal, though Ichijō's little sister is terrified upon seeing Mesousa covered in various mushrooms.
| 21 | "A Demon Wearing Clothes"; Transliteration: "Oni ni Koromo" (Japanese: 鬼に衣) | Yuji Moriyama | Kenichi Kanemaki; Sumio Uetake | Yuji Moriyama | November 21, 2005 |
Suzune, Otome, Behoimi and Media capture Akane in the midst of a battle against Yuzuko. Akane finds herself held captive in the research room by the Class 1-C students dressed as Rebecca. The Class 1-C students explain that Rebecca has gone missing just as the parent–teacher association is scheduled for an inspection. With help from Yūma and Yūna, the Class 1-C students recruit Akane to be Rebecca's double despite her plea, but Rei manages to convince Akane with reverse psychology. The Class 1-C students educate Akane on Rebecca's personality and mannerisms, but Akane struggles to maintain character. As the parent–teacher association arrives for the inspection, the Class 1-C students give visual cues to keep Akane in check. Akane becomes distracted when her classmates as well as Old Geezer start spying on her. When the parent–teacher association believes that Akane is not qualified as a teacher, Akane stands up for herself, causing the parent–teacher association to fall back. At the end of class, it is revealed that Rebecca was Sayaka's double in order to monitor Akane and the Class 1-C students without being noticed.
| 22 | "Today a Man, Tomorrow a Mouse"; Transliteration: "Kinka Ichijitsu no Ei" (Japanese: 槿花一日の栄) | Shin Oonuma | Katsuhiko Takayama | Michio Fukuda | November 28, 2005 |
Showing up late for class, Himeko informs Rebecca that a television crew from a late-night variety show will be interviewing teachers and students. The Class 1-C students discuss the possibilities of becoming famous, though Rei realizes that her classmates are not suited for television. Although the Class 1-C students believe that Rebecca is the most unique among them, Rebecca refuses to be on television. The next day, the Class 1-C students get worried when Rebecca does not show up to class. The Class 1-A students make snide remarks about Miyuki during the interview. Meanwhile, the Class 1-C students find Rebecca in the research room. Media tries to convince Behoimi to change into her magical girl costume, while Tsuguri wonders why Misao did not bring any rare pets. Due to their antics, the Class 1-C students are kicked out of the research room one by one. Media soon tells the Class 1-C students that Rebecca isolated herself because she is a child prodigy. The Class 1-C students return to their classroom upon realizing that Rebecca has a change of heart, but Lord Cat and Giant Salamander accidentally release a scary mask from the ceiling, causing the television crew to run away.
| 23 | "Misfortunes Never Come One by One"; Transliteration: "Yowarime ni Tatarime" (Japanese: 弱り目に祟り目) | Taiki Nishimura | Kenichi Kanemaki | Osamu Tadokoro | December 5, 2005 |
The weather gets unseasonably cold towards the end of the school year, which concerns Rebecca and the Class 1-C students. Miyako, Sayaka and Kurumi want to visit a hot spring, but their dream is ruined by Ichijō. Himeko is upset when Rei warms up by wearing a tracksuit. After taking up puppetry as a hobby, Suzune gradually starts a puppet theater troupe with Akane, Rebecca and Yuzuko. A series of unfortunate events occur within the school, including when Misao's hair thwacks Tsuguri through a top floor window in the school hallway. Himeko tells a fictional origin story about noodles and pasta, but Rei and Miyako already see a plot hole. An orchestra is collectively shown with Kurumi on piano, Himeko on bassoon, Ichijō on violin, Behoimi on cello, Mesousa on oboe, Yuzuko on harp, Akane on guitar, Rei on trumpet, Media on percussion, Sayaka on saxophone, Miyako on viola and Rebecca as the conductor. Rebecca and the Class 1-C students have a case of bad luck in unique ways. Suddenly, a blizzard appears, trapping all the students and teachers inside the school. To make matters worse, an impact event becomes imminent when a giant comet approaches Earth.
| 24 | "You Are Responsible for Your Own Death"; Transliteration: "Shi shite Shikabane Hirou Mono Nashi" (Japanese: 死して屍拾う者なし) | Tatsuya Oishi | Kenichi Kanemaki | Tatsuya Oishi | December 12, 2005 |
In a side story set during the Edo period, Rebecca imposed a new tax which fines anyone who weeps in public, while Yankee and Zula are assigned as officers. Akira, Tsuguri and Otome are each arrested for defying the weeping tax. After finding Miyuki in a holding cell, Akane hires the Class 1-C students to overthrow the government for just fifty yen. Hibiki informs the Class 1-C students that Yuzuko, Shū and Lord Cat were also arrested. At night, Himeko, Rei, Ichijō, Miyako and Sayaka infiltrate the palace while leaving Kurumi behind. Rebecca manages to repeatedly evade them while Mesousa gets caught each time. However, Rei eventually defeats Rebecca and abolishes the weeping tax.
| 25 | "A Time of Crisis"; Transliteration: "Kikyū Sonbō no Toki" (Japanese: 危急存亡の秋) | Yasuo Ejima | Katsuhiko Takayama | Michio Fukuda | December 19, 2005 |
Giant Salamander, revealed to be the principal's pet, dispatches Rebecca and the Class 1-C students to defend Earth, though they are not too ecstatic about it until Giant Salamander rewards them with cafeteria vouchers. Akane, Hibiki, Akira and Yuzuko report several anomalies that occur as a result of the approaching giant comet. Rebecca and the Class 1-C students deploy in the mecha. Michael makes an unexpectedly appearance, delivering a message from the giant comet. It turns out that the giant comet is actually the Ichijō Festival, a mysterious cardboard box first seen during the school festival before the Aliens somehow obtained and discarded it in outer space. After launching an all-out attack, Rebecca and the Class 1-C students end up getting sucked inside the Ichijō Festival, where the remains of other space civilizations were also collected. Tasked with destroying the shrine found at the core of the Ichijō Festival, the Class 1-C students each start hallucinating their fantasy worlds, though Rebecca rallies them together and motivates them to protect the school. Mesousa is sent to evict Lord Cat from the shrine before Rebecca destroys it, thus restoring the weather on Earth.
| 26 | "No One Knows What May Happen Tomorrow"; Transliteration: "Issun Saki wa Yami" (Japanese: 一寸先は闇) | Shin Oonuma | Kenichi Kanemaki | Michio Fukuda | December 26, 2005 |
Despite the recent blizzard, all the teachers and students suffer from a heat wave in various ways. Later on, Rebecca and the Class 1-C students witness a water park emerging from the school grounds, where the principal cancels afternoon classes as announced by the Raccoon Dog. Everyone has some fun under the sun at the water park, and hilarity ensues amongst the characters. A picture is shown of all the main and supporting characters of the series. The Aliens, appearing as characters from Star Trek: The Next Generation, conclude that Earth is a threat because Rebecca is a genius, though Rebecca jumps her cue on the scene. The next morning, Rebecca quickly does roll call for the Class 1-C students. The Alien Captain brings Mesousa onto the spaceship, while considering that Earth is no longer a threat.
| OVA | "As Long as You Act Decisively, Even the Demons and Gods Won't Stand in Your Way"; Transliteration: "Danjite Okonaeba Kishin mo Kore wo Saku" (Japanese: 断じて行えば鬼神もこれを避く) | Kazuhiro Oota | Katsuhiko Takayama | Kazuhiro Oota | April 15, 2009 |
Yūna, Himeko, Rei, Akane, Otome, Kurumi and Miyako have failed the year-end exam and must take the resit exam, but whoever wins in an upcoming kick the can competition organized by the student council will be exempt from the resit exam. With the playing field being the school grounds, Rebecca leads the defending team, composed of Misao, Tsuguri, Suzune, Shū, Ichijō, Sayaka, Yuzuko, Yūma, Akira, Behoimi and Media, against the seven failing students as the attacking team. Meanwhile, the Aliens converse about Galaxy Rider trading cards. Rebecca's plan of doing a thorough search is set into motion. Shū captures Kurumi in the bushes, Suzune captures Otome in a gym locker and Shū also captures Miyako in the gym equipment room. Both Akane and Rei manage to outsmart the defending team, though Himeko and Yūna ends up captured by Yūma. With only five minutes left, Akane disguised as Rebecca is tricked by Rebecca disguised as Rei, while Rei is captured by Behoimi and Media. At the last second, the attacking team wins when Ichijō betrays Rebecca by kicking the can in the direction of the spaceship.
