= List of Pani Poni characters =

The main characters of Pani Poni (from left to right): Himeko Katagiri, Ichijō, Miyako Uehara, Rebecca Miyamoto, Rei Tachibana, Mesousa, Kurumi Momose, Behoimi, and Sayaka Suzuki (No. 6).

This is a list of characters in Pani Poni.

== Momotsuki High School ==
=== Main characters (Class 1-C) ===
Rebecca Miyamoto (レベッカ 宮本, Rebekka Miyamoto)
Voiced by: Chiwa Saitō (Japanese); Hilary Haag (English)
Rebecca, also referred to as "Becky" by her class, is the 11-year-old homeroom teacher of class 1-C. In the manga, she was born to an American mother and a Japanese father. In the anime, she was born to an American father and a Japanese mother, although she keeps her mother's last name. (Note: In one instance, Becky said she reverses her parental lineage and says she was born to an American mother and Japanese father. In the anime, the Aliens say she is the "second daughter of the Miyamoto family", and she has mentioned that she has a sister, although her sister does not make an appearance.) After graduating from MIT at the age of ten, (Note: Becky enrolled at MIT at the age of nine, and graduated at ten with a triple major.) she becomes a mathematics teacher at Momotsuki High. Normally lethargic and halfhearted, she dons a cool face to keep her genius reputation. However, when confronted with a frightening or uncomfortable situation, she hides behind a curtain where she whimpers "hau hau (はうはう)".
After she gets permission to create a personal research lab in the school, she finds much to her surprise that students start coming to her with their problems, looking for counseling. Even after discovering what began this turn of events - a sign posted on the door saying to the effect that she was offering counseling - and taking off the sign, students still come back several times in the series for help. Her room is also used as a somewhat "home base" for class 1-C beside their own classroom. In each episode both in the anime and manga, she dons a different outfit which would seem too "cute" for a teacher but usually fits the style of clothing for a girl her age. Often she is displayed as especially childish, such as wearing pajamas designed to make the wearer look like a cat.
Rebecca also displays a very protective side. Examples of this include her confronting the hijacker in the field trip episode, as well as the Matango alien which had possessed Himeko. She seems perfectly willing to lay aside her own safety for the safety of her students. At one point in the manga storyline, she is temporarily dismissed by Momotsuki High and enrolls in the class 5-2 of Momotsuki Third Elementary, where she becomes a close friend with Nozomi Ichijō, Ichijō's younger sister, and Miyabi Inugami, Inugami's younger sister.
Himeko Katagiri (片桐 姫子, Katagiri Himeko)
Voiced by: Fumiko Orikasa (Japanese); Brittney Karbowski (English)
Himeko is a wastefully energetic girl who usually calls out "maho" ("マホ") - a nonsensical catchphrase that has no particular meaning. She frequently annoys the other students with her antics and her inability to carry a straight train of thought. In the anime, her cowlick (the lock of hair on her head) contains a mysterious power that gives Himeko her limitless energy and is capable of movement on its own accord. After the mushroom incident of the anime, her cowlick shrinks and in order to appear as if nothing has changed, she wears a wig to mask it. Whenever this wig is pulled off, she again loses her energy, though it is returned once the wig is returned to her head. At one point in the manga storyline, Himeko is transferred to Class D after voluntarily becoming a 'free agent'.
Another of Himeko's catchphrases is saying that a particular thing is "Omega" (for example, "Omega cute!"). Himeko possesses the ability to eat as much as she pleases without ever becoming fat, and is particularly fond of crabs, albeit the imitation kind. Out of all of the girls, Himeko is by far Becky's biggest fan, much to Becky's chagrin.
Rei Tachibana (橘 玲, Tachibana Rei)
Voiced by: Satsuki Yukino (Japanese); Carlee Gabrisch (English)
Rei is a girl with a heart and appearance as cold as ice. Of the girls in the class 1-C, Rei is the most mature one. Threatening bodily harm is Rei's way of enforcing order in the classroom with Himeko being her usual target (Often her threat is she will pull out Himeko's cowlick). She is the one to put Becky in her place when she gets out of hand and also the one to lure Becky out from behind the curtain with candy after she has put the fear of God into her. Rei has the second highest GPA in the entire school and works four days per week at a Chinese restaurant. However, Rei is shown to have no artistic talent. Despite her apparent coldness, Rei is often the one to teach Becky important moral lessons. She is like a big sister to Becky. She has also shown herself to have a greedy streak as when during the school festival she purposely made it so their classroom was the most popular so that she could reap the profits later, something she was unable to do since all profits went to charity. Her reason for wearing glasses appear to be contradictory in the manga. In one instance, it suggests she is nearly blind without them. In another instance, she indicates she only wears them as a disguise since students at her school are not meant to have part time jobs.
Ichijō (一条, Ichijō)
Voiced by: Ai Nonaka (Japanese); Maggie Flecknoe (English)
Ichijō is class 1-C's mysterious class representative whose given name is unknown, and frequently shown drinking green tea. She is always calm about everything and uses honorific speech, but is prone to erratic, questionable behavior. Her activities, at least near the beginning of the anime series, are normally limited to standing up, sitting down, and announcing that she is "the class representative, Ichijō". In later episodes in anime series, she often does the seemingly impossible without ever saying more than a word or two about it, including successfully performing an effective rain prayer twice. In others she is strongly implied to be attempting to kill the rest of the cast including trying to poison Rebecca (and successfully poisoning Mesousa), poisoning Hibiki Watanuki, and implicitly poisoning the school water supply. She has two younger sisters in the manga, the youngest one also appears in the anime episodes mysteriously; she relies on drawing on a sketchpad to communicate as she is too young to converse. In the anime series, aside from Ichijō and her sister, no one else is aware of the Aliens keeping watch over Becky.
Miyako Uehara (上原 都, Uehara Miyako)
Voiced by: Yui Horie (Japanese); Natalie Nassar (English)
Miyako is known as a "bookworm", a name which she earned through her perpetual studying and which she detests, though her score is almost average. Among her class, Miyako is the one with the most realistic attitude. She will often get mad if she is unable to study due to the crazy antics that she often gets put into, which are also often against her will.
She also has a very large and very shiny forehead which gets more extreme with each episode. It starts off with a simple sheen in the first episode; in the second episode, it becomes a blinding flash; by the third episode, others are actually able to style their hair in the reflection on her forehead. In a later episode, her forehead becomes so bright that the other characters are forced to don welding masks to be able to look at her. Also, she apparently possesses ESP. In some of the more strenuous events in the series, she always tries to keep a level head, though is not always able to accomplish this with sheer will power alone. In the manga storyline, she often studies abroad under the guidance of "The Professor", who also appears in the anime. She is not always seen wearing glasses as she does have contact lenses as well. After she returned from the abroad study, due to large amount of time that she missed from classes, she has earned a new nickname of Banchō (番長) or 'the leader'. She explained both in anime and manga that after long hours of studying, it is much easier on her eyes to wear glasses than contacts.
Kurumi Momose (桃瀬 くるみ, Momose Kurumi)
Voiced by: Kana Ueda (Japanese); Melissa Davis (English)
Kurumi is a girl who is above average in appearance, athletics, and academics, but who nonetheless suffers from being called plain/boring all the time. If there is even a hint that somebody has called her plain/boring, she goes off to sulk alone, often in the rabbit cage with Mesousa. She has been known to fade almost completely out of existence altogether when she gets called plain/boring or ignored too much. Kurumi is a very fast sprinter, and also played varsity basketball. She is the twin sister of Shū Momose of class 1-A who is known for his cooking skills, something that she herself does not possess.
Unlike in most anime and manga where the younger sister will call her brother Onii-chan (お兄ちゃん), Kurumi refers to her brother as Aniki (兄貴), which is a much more masculine way of addressing an older brother. It might be due to this that, due to her reactions as seen in the anime, she has a fascination with how some girls in Japan are now using the pronoun boku (僕), meaning "I", which is usually only said by Japanese males. It is never explained why she enjoyed this so much. From the anime episode eleven on, she is shown with her hair grown longer. Additionally, from episode nineteen on, she ties her hair in twin braids. She cuts her hair back to its original length for episode twenty-six and it magically grows throughout its progression. In the manga, she is also shown with her hair grown longer from some episodes, sometimes ties it in twin braids, but she does not cut her hair back.
In later anime episodes, after experiencing much of the unrealistic events in the first half of the series, she starts to see reality in a whole new light and starts little by little to accept giant fighting robots and small talking animals to be normal occurrences in everyday life. Despite this new outlook at how crazy her life really is, the others always seem to overlook her estranged claims. When not in school, she also has a part time job at a moe café named "Étoile" though due to her not being considered moe, business is not as good as the owner would want it to be, as illustrated in the author's other manga, Maro-Mayu (まろまゆ).
Sayaka Suzuki (鈴木 さやか, Suzuki Sayaka)
Voiced by: Kayo Sakata (Japanese); Monica Rial (English)
Sayaka is considered the "good girl" of the class, who usually gets taken advantage of because of her giving and devoted personality. Though her classmates often send her on errands and menial tasks, she says she does not mind it. In one episode where she is happily riding with a person in a convertible, the 1-C girls assume that she has a boyfriend, but it turns out to be Miss Igarashi, the teacher of class 1-A, whom she admires.
Sayaka's nickname is Number Six (6号, Roku-gō). In the anime, the Aliens postulate that it was given to her by her drunken father because she was the sixth-born child in her family. The manga explains the origin of her nickname to be from Igarashi as Sayaka was the sixth Suzuki to attend the school. Sometimes Becky refers to Sayaka as "big ribbon" or "oversized" due to her hairstyle - giant pigtails tied with two large white ribbons. In the anime, she has a catchphrase where she calls someone or something "the ~~ of the year", for example, "Miss Miyamoto, you're the teacher of the year", or "Miss Miyamoto, you're the walking encyclopedia of the year".
Mesousa (メソウサ)
Voiced by: Vanilla Yamazaki (Japanese); Christine Auten (English)
Mesousa is a parody of the "cute mascot" type characters often seen in anime, with one huge difference: Mesousa has a severe case of depression. His lack of thumbs makes everyday tasks almost impossible, further deepening his depression. Practically useless in every way, Mesousa serves as the slapstick of the series, being blown up in one episode and having his legs broken in another, all without complaint. He also appears to be somewhat infatuated with Ichijō. Mesousa is not Becky's pet, but rather her companion who tries to help her in class such as getting and holding the footstool for her while she stands on it to write on the blackboard. His name derives from the combination of "meso meso," a Japanese phonomime for whimpering, and "usagi" (兎), which is Japanese for "rabbit".

=== Supporting characters (Class 1-A) ===
Miyuki Igarashi (五十嵐 美由紀, Igarashi Miyuki)
Voiced by: Sayaka Ohara (Japanese); Shelley Calene-Black (English)
Ms. Igarashi is the homeroom teacher of class 1-A, and has a reputation for being a hard drinker. She is frequently tardy or daydreaming in class, either because she is suffering from a hangover or because she is simply bored with teaching. Miyuki is known by her students to never dress up, nor wear makeup and to almost always reek of alcohol. She frequently stares out the window of her classroom and says that she wishes she was a cloud; a wish that often is only heard by Shū. Often, the empty seats in her class are replaced with Japanese-style scarecrows in the anime episodes.
In the anime episodes, she owns a right-hand-driving MG Midget in British Racing Green of which she is quite protective. After Old Geezer did her the favor of asking the headmaster to allow her to park it on campus, she lets him drive it whenever he likes. Despite him being a reckless driver, however, he always brings it back without a scratch on it. In the manga episodes, she sometimes comes to school on a full-cowled, racer-replica style motorcycle.
Shū Momose (桃瀬 修, Momose Shū)
Voiced by: Takahiro Sakurai (Japanese); Brandon Hearnsberger (English)
Shū is the older twin brother of Kurumi Momose, however, even he cannot resist calling Kurumi "plain" from time to time. Shū is a laid-back character and a skilled cook. He helps his often drunk and irresponsible homeroom teacher, Miyuki Igarashi, take care of class 1-A. Also, he can be easily persuaded into doing things, like when asked to prepare Becky's lunch for her every day or when during that time be persuaded to take a day off. This can make him seem like a guy that also succumbs to pressure, especially that of a group, as in episode 4 when he was told to prepare a bath for all of the girls and did not even complain about it.
Yūma Kashiwagi (柏木 優麻, Kashiwagi Yūma) and Yūna Kashiwagi (柏木 優奈, Kashiwagi Yūna)
Voiced by: Sawa Ishige (Japanese); Serena Varghese (English)
Yūma and Yūna Kashiwagi are identical twins, but Yūma has the more outgoing personality. When the twins are called together, Yuma is almost always the one to speak up first that they are indeed separate people and should be called on differently. Despite this, Miyuki and Rei do not see why they should try to tell them apart which further angers Yūma. She and her twin are interested in fashion and dressing up, but when her twin auditions or performs for anything, Yūma enjoys secretly using her pen to write large and clearly visible characters on Yūna's forehead for good luck. Often Yūna is disqualified from whatever she was auditioning for because of this. Yūma defends that this is not done in spite but in love though it takes some persuading of Yūna to make her believe it. Whatever her intentions may be, it is never clearly explained, at least in the anime, which it is. Yūma always ties her hair on the left side of her head with a blue ribbon and wears knee socks of the same color. Both she and her sister are in the Drama Club and are in charge of making most of the costumes, some of which they wear to class in some episodes.
Yūna is the second Kashiwagi twin and, in sharp contrast to her sister, is very introverted and soft-spoken. She is often the victim of Yūma's pranks and usually goes along with all of her plans. However, due to her personality and penchant to be easily embarrassed, she does not always do what Yūma requests of her, like in one episode where she was to model some new clothes along with Yūma but would not, saying it was too embarrassing. They both get annoyed when Miyuki calls on either of them as "Kashiwagi twins" as if they are one person, though it is usually her sister that speaks up on their behalf. Yūna ties her hair tied on the right side of her head with a red ribbon and wears similarly colored stockings.
In Hikawa's manga, Momo-Gumi!! (桃組っ!!), Yūna is treated as one of the heroines who belong to the Japanese idol group "Momo-Gumi!!".
Yuzuko Kurusu (来栖 柚子, Kurusu Yuzuko)
Voiced by: Asuka Nakase (Japanese); Kim-Ly Nguyen (English)
Yuzuko is initially seen donning costumes left and right, most notably the rooster costume that makes appearances in the earlier anime episodes. She is a member of the Intelligence Club, the president of which is a black cat. She is number 003 in the Intelligence Club.
Along with the two other members of the Intelligence Club, Hibiki and Akira, she randomly follows other students. The only person who uses the club's talents seems to be Rebecca. In later anime episodes and manga chapters, Yuzuko is best known for her membership in the Film Club and for her frequent encounters with Akane Serizawa of the Drama Club. When they are dressed up in costumes from their respective clubs, they fight, since the Film Club and the Drama Club are apparently natural enemies. However, when not in costume, they are very good friends and like to hang out together, both unaware of the clubs each is in.
Hikaru Nikaidō (二階堂 ヒカル, Nikaidō Hikaru)
Hikaru is a girl with glasses, and sometimes adhesive tapes. Though she makes only brief appearances in the manga episodes, she is a heroine in Hikawa's manga, TG Angel Gyaiko-chan (TG天使ジャイ子ちゃん, TG Tenshi Jaiko-chan). As her conditions and personality are linked to the author's, she is so weak, sloppy and hysteric.

=== Supporting characters (Class 1-B) ===
Saotome (早乙女, Saotome)
Voiced by: Eiji Hanawa (Japanese); John Gremillion (English)
Mr. Saotome is the homeroom teacher for class 1-B and is also the physical education teacher. He is often highly energetic and enthusiastic, but due to this he also often makes a scene in front of his students. He is almost never seen without his jersey. Rebecca once teases him about the fact that "it must be great to be a PE teacher and see high school girls in their gym uniforms all the time", where she implies that Saotome masks another personality, though this is never confirmed.
Hibiki Watanuki (綿貫 響, Watanuki Hibiki)
Voiced by: Chieko Higuchi (Japanese); Lesley Tesh (English)
Hibiki is a member of the school council Intelligence Club and is constantly assuming undercover activities. She always carries a camcorder to record school events with her two subordinates Akira and Yuzuko in the anime episodes, especially those concerning Becky. When doing this, she will often change her mind about what to report on, always wanting to find a better "scoop". She considers Rei to be her rival. Her investigations often end with her (implied) death, though she is always alive and well in the next episode.
Suzune Shiratori (白鳥 鈴音, Shiratori Suzune)
Voiced by: Ryō Hirohashi (Japanese); Kira Vincent-Davis (English)
Suzune is a tall, athletic girl and the best friend of Otome Akiyama. Suzune's favorite hobby is to put Otome in a hold and press on a spot on her head, saying that this will keep Otome, who is very sensitive about her short stature, from growing taller, though instead of hitting the pressure point to stunt her growth, always hits the pressure point to induce diarrhea. Though always smiling, she has a habit of using violence to compel anyone, who does not seem to agree with her, into submission. In the anime, one of her attack is shown to be enlarging her hand mysteriously and letting loose a devastating "chop" on an unsuspecting character who is always left incapacitated afterward. This furthers the fact that she is a very strong girl even though it does not look it at first. Later in the anime series, when Hibiki rescues her, she shows a talent for making hand puppets depicting chibi forms of some of the characters, herself included.
Otome Akiyama (秋山 乙女, Akiyama Otome)
Voiced by: Tsugumi Higasayama (Japanese); Cynthia Martinez (English)
Otome is very athletic, especially known for her track and field abilities. Her short height becomes a running joke in the series but Suzune is the one that teases her about it most of the time. In fact, she has not grown an inch since she was in junior high school, which when she makes this comment, would have been about nine months. She even comes to Becky late in the series asking for help in this field, but Becky cannot help her. Also, she is often disrespectful to her superiors, especially Saotome, refusing to refer to him as "sensei" (先生; meaning "teacher").
Yankee (ヤンキー, Yankī)
Voiced by: Eiji Hanawa (Japanese); Andrew Love (English)
Yankee usually makes very brief appearances, portrayed as a nerdy, fat character. He hates physical education class and frequently skips that class. He also frequently adds "dot com" to everything he says (for example, "He's totally lost it, dot com.") "Yankee" in Japanese slang refers to rebellious high school / junior high school students known for dying their hair and engaging in anti-social behavior. In a few episodes both in anime and manga, he is shown with a strange purple snake coming out of his mouth which even speaks in some episodes. This purple snake is known to scare Hibiki.
Zula (ズーラ, Zūra)
Voiced by: Mugihito (Japanese); Eve Jones (English)
According to the "Official Guidebook"s sold in Japan, Zula is a girl, though she looks like a guy. Because she is from some foreign country, her Japanese is not so fluent and polite. In the anime episodes, she sometimes appears with a curious bird-like costume inspired from the classic manga of Yasuji Tanioka, saying "Asa nanoyo" (朝ナノヨ!; literally meaning, "The morning has come!").
Itō (伊藤)
Not much is known or revealed about this character in the animated series. She wears the standard Peach Moon uniform and her face is drawn differently from the other characters in that she has a bulbous nose, fat lips and pitch black eyes. Multiple Itō's are often used to represent crowds of people or the other members of class 1-B in the anime episodes. It is shown in one scene in the anime where she possibly died and was reborn after several cats started to feast on her corpse, not unlike that of Catwoman.
Hiroshi Kanbara (神原 宙, Kanbara Hiroshi)
Hiroshi is a newcomer of the school council Intelligence Club. He wears black sunglasses. He assists Hibiki with the intelligence gathering activities. However, his true identity turns out to be a subordinate of the Aliens, whose purpose is to gather information about the Earth.

=== Supporting characters (Class 1-D) ===
Old Geezer (ジジイ, Jijii; "Old Man") (Note: "Jijii" (爺) is used to address a grandfather or an old man in Japanese.)
Voiced by: Hiroshi Ōtake (Japanese); Andy McAvin (English)
Old Geezer is the homeroom teacher of class 1-D. He wears an armband on his left arm that displays different messages every time it is shown. He is surprisingly lively for his old age and is seen as strange by his students, but the feeling is actually mutual. To keep his class in order, he uses different scare tactics, one of which was to haunt his students after he died if they left in the middle of class.
Behoimi (ベホイミ)
Voiced by: Mai Kadowaki (Japanese); Rozie Curtis (English)
Behoimi describes herself as a healing or soothing-type magical girl, and wears an eye-grabbing pink costume to prove it. Her name is a reference to a moderate healing spell in the Dragon Quest RPG series. Although she claims to be a magical girl, she never displays any magic powers, since if she were observed using magical powers, she would have to return to the land of magic. In the meantime, she dons a typical magical girl outfit and has an energetic personality, and is only seen down in spirits in the anime.
After coming to terms that she cannot continue with her magical girl persona, she completely changes her appearance by donning glasses, dying her hair black, tying it in pigtails, and dressing normally. Her personality becomes much more reserved and serious. She still desires to help people, although there is not much she can do as a normal student. (Note: After dressing up as a normal student, Behoimi is sometimes seen with a magical girl costume, although it is usually against her will, for instance, in episode 10, the twins catch her in the hallway and dress her up as one.)
Prior to the series, Behoimi and Media have worked together. When Media becomes a student at her school, Behoimi helps her disarm a number of bombs.
Behoimi is featured in the author's spinoff work, The Alternative Cure Magical Girl Behoimi-chan (新感覚癒し系魔法少女ベホイミちゃん, Shin Kankaku Iyashikei Mahō Shōjo Behoimi-chan), where she is a heroine with quasi-magical powers given by the Aliens, and fights against the invaders from other planets.
Tsurugi Inugami (犬神 つるぎ, Inugami Tsurugi)
Voiced by: Hiroshi Kamiya (Japanese); Chris Patton (English)
Tsurugi often helps Misao find her lost pets. He has a serious, conservative demeanor and gets top grades in his class. His "caring for lost children" stat in the image refers to episode seven, in which he returns Ichijo's missing little sister. He has a German mother in the manga, and a German grandfather in the anime. Tsurugi often criticizes Misao for her odd like in animals though ends up helping her nonetheless.
Akane Serizawa (芹沢 茜, Serizawa Akane)
Voiced by: Miyuki Sawashiro (Japanese); Luci Christian (English)
Akane is an enthused student who likes to over-dramatize things. She is a member of the drama club and enjoys donning costumes and tricking her more slow-witted schoolmates, such as Himeko. The sharper characters, usually Rei or Miyako, see through her schemes easily but usually allow her to continue for a while for entertainment. She is notable for her nekomimi (cat ear) hair (she has a normal set of ears hidden under her hair) and her vicious humour — she frequently imitates Jason Voorhees and wears a hand puppet of him to scare the others. The costume of hers that reoccurs the most in the anime is a robot named Roboko, literally meaning "Robot girl".
One notable episode shows her in a dramatic fight against Yuzuko Kurusu of the Movie Club as Godzilla VS. Robot. Akane and Yuzuko are a canon "yuri" pair in the manga, and the anime gives a small indication of their developing relationship. Serizawa is also considered a pseudo-main character; she has so much interaction with the main cast from class 1-C that she often appears with them or being included in the production of official merchandise such as figurines that do not include the other main characters.
The students of class 1-C (Rei in particular) tend to utilize Serizawa's acting talent on occasion, such as trying to provide a distraction for the bull man by first dressing up as a heifer, and then as Suzune, resulting in being attacked with a bazooka both times. She was also used in the PTA episode as a stand in for Becky (Successfully in this case.) Her disguises are always obvious to the viewer of course, as her neko-mimi hair always stands out. Miyuki Sawashiro, her Japanese voice actress, also plays another blue-haired, four-eared, costume-loving girl with a wicked sense of humour in the Galaxy Angel series as Mint Blancmanche.
Misao Nanjō (南条 操, Nanjō Misao)
Voiced by: Hitomi Nabatame (Japanese); Sasha Paysinger (English)
Misao is an energetic girl who loves animals and regularly brings them to school. Her pet collection is extensive and includes exotic animals such as snakes and alligators. Her idiosyncrasy is giving her pets bland names, frequently simple wordplays on the pet's natural name. She frequently enlists Tsurugi Inugami's help in finding her pets when she loses any of them. Additionally, her pets are used to fill in all the other empty seats in class 1-D, so in effect, this classroom takes on the feel more like a zoo than a classroom, something that is noted later in the anime series.
Akira Miyata (宮田 晶, Miyata Akira)
Voiced by: Ryōko Shintani (Japanese); Jessica Boone (English)
Akira has a reputation for being clumsy because she frequently trips and falls. She is very sensitive about her clumsiness, but she is, ironically, also a member of the Intelligence Club in the anime series. Her number is 002. Her only redeeming characteristic is her razor buzz haircut. Due to her clumsiness, Akira is frequently referred to by Inugami as "dojikko (ドジっ子)", which usually translates to a stereotypical clumsy girl. At the school festival, Akira talks about her aptly named FALL (Funny Anecdotes and Laughable Lore) Club.
Media (メディア)
Voiced by: Miyu Matsuki (Japanese); Kara Greenberg (English)
Media first appears in episode 9 as The Professor's assistant, and enrolls in Momotsuki High to keep an eye on Becky. She possesses superhuman strength and is always cheerful. She resembles Ichijō in that she does the seemingly impossible, but she does this much less frequently than Ichijō. She and Behoimi have a past together that they vaguely allude to but never explain fully. Media is nearly always smiling and never "opens" her eyes, except for one instance in episode 9. Also, she is almost never seen without wearing her trademark maid outfit in the anime. In later episodes, she attempts to persuade Behoimi to take on her role as the "healing magical girl" once more, even in one episode putting a smaller version of her magic wand in her hand, trying to invoke a response, but Behoimi does not fall victim to her suggestions. Apparently, she and Behoimi once fought. Similarly to her, her name is a reference to a moderate healing spell from the Megami Tensei series.

=== Supporting characters (11th and 12th graders) ===
Most of the 11th and 12th graders appear only in manga or drama CD episodes. But, some make brief appearances in the anime.

==== Drama Club ====
Madoka Fujimiya (藤宮 円, Fujimiya Madoka)
Voiced by: Tomoko Kaneda
Though Madoka (3-D) is as short as Becky, and looks quite childish, she manages the drama club. She one-sidedly hates the movie club, especially its president, Maria.
Haruka Takamizawa (高見沢 ハルカ, Takamizawa Haruka)
Haruka (3-A) is another member of the drama club. She has an excellent talent in writing scenarios, so most of the plays by the drama club feature scenarios written by her. And she has a grandfather named Toujiro (遠次郎, Toujiro), who is the president of a toy manufacturing company. She has a habit of reciting monologue with strange imaginations, which often makes others uncomfortable.
Kazuya Takase (高瀬 和也, Takase Kazuya)
Voiced by: Daisuke Hirakawa
Kazuya (2-A) is a member of the drama club too. Though he often gets flung out by Madoka, he sometimes seems to enjoy the atmosphere.

==== Movie Club ====
The Movie Club's activities mainly consist of creating amateur movies and watching various films. They are well known for creating movies with novel approach.

Maria Asō (麻生 真里亜, Asō Maria)
Maria (3-C) is the president of the movie club. Though she had no dialogues, she made brief appearance on the anime, too. Though Madoka, the manager of the drama club, is exclusively chilly to her, she does not care at all. Mahiro Asō, the homeroom teacher of the class 5-2, Momotsuki Third elementary school, is her older sister.
Tetsuya Ōtaki (大滝 鉄矢, Ōtaki Tetsuya)
Tetsuya (3-A) is a member of the movie club, too. He used to belong to the judo club.
Masato Shinohara (篠原 雅人, Shinohara Masato)
Masato (2-A) is another member of the movie club. He used to be a member of the photo club, and now he takes charge of camera works in the movie club. He is acquainted with Drama Club's Haruka Takamizawa.

==== Committee of the Class Representatives ====
Yukie Sena (瀬奈 雪絵, Sena Yukie)
Yukie is the class representative of Class 2-B. She wears glasses and has a cowlick.
Minori Ōmori (大森 みのり, Ōmori Minori)
Minori is the class representative of Class 3-D. She is a member of literature club. Although she is seen wearing glasses, she has a bad sight even with the glasses on, giving her airhead personality. She has trouble remembering people's faces.
Eriko Asahina (朝比奈 英理子, Asahina Eriko)
Eriko is the class representative of Class 2-A. She is the head of the discipline committee. She has a long braided hair and a large bust.

==== Other 11th and 12th Graders ====
The President of the Intelligence Club (諜報部部長, Chōhōbu Buchō)
Almost all the information about this character is unknown except that he/she uses animal puppets when he/she wants to talk with Hibiki and/or other club members, keeping his/her shape covered with something.
Makoto Okamoto (岡本 誠, Okamoto Makoto)
Makoto (3-A) is the president of the model building club. As he prides of the club's effort to make a huge diorama of the whole city, he is crashed out because the diorama is "crushed" by Yuzuko (1-A) and Akane (1-D) battling with the robot/godzilla suits on.
Takashi Kitagawa (北川 高志, Kitagawa Takashi)
Takashi (3-C) was the president of the comedy club, that ceased to exist because of the total lack of the numbers of the members. Later, he entered Kitakantō Tsuppari Union (北関東ツッパリ連合, Kitakantō Tsuppari Rengō), a fictional group of "Yankee"s in northern Kantō region in Japan, but the reason is not officially described yet.
Mikiko Tendō (天堂 美貴子, Tendō Mikiko)
Mikiko (2-A) is the president of the cheerleading club, the member of which is herself only. Sometimes Miyako (1-C) and Sayaka (1-C) are called by her to help practicing cheerleading.
Karin Shiroyama (白山かりん, Shiroyama Karin)
Karin (2-C) is a member of the game club. Her first appearance on the series was on School Megane (スクールメガネ), the bonus booklet of manga volume nine, as a producer of the fictitious PC game Chase Cruiser Glassty, which the game club released. She persists in glasses abnormally so that every character in the game of her produce wears the glasses, along with that she herself wears them, too.

== Pani Poni Dash! characters ==
The following characters had major or supporting roles in the Pani Poni Dash! anime.

The Aliens (宇宙人, Uchūjin)
Alien Captain Voiced by: Mugihito (Japanese); Mike MacRae (Ep. 1-14), Andrew Love (Ep. 15-26) (English)
Alien Subordinate Voiced by: Tomokazu Sugita (Japanese); Rob Mungle (English)
The Aliens are a group of aliens who observe Becky from orbit of the Earth. They are often involved in numerous silly antics, but seem to be adhere to a code of non-interference with the humans. Ichijō and her sister are the only ones who know about them. Their ship looks almost exactly like an upside down Musai from Mobile Suit Gundam (whose design was derived from an upside-down USS Enterprise (NCC-1701)), and in the final episodes they resemble (or have their reflections in the ship turn into) characters from Star Trek: The Next Generation, specifically Captain Jean-Luc Picard, William Riker, and Geordi La Forge. This is a reference to the fact that Mugihito voiced Picard in the Japanese dub of Star Trek: The Next Generation.
At points, the bridge of their ship is an exact replica of the Enterprise-D's. For a time, Ichijō was involved romantically with the captain, but eventually their code of non-interference forced them to end their relationship. The Aliens seem to be modeled slightly after Zeon's mobile suits, a trait that is further shown by the command antenna on the captain's head.
Lord Cat (ネコ神様, Neko-gami-sama; "Cat God")
Voiced by: Hiroshi Kamiya (Japanese); Tommy Drake (English)
Lord Cat is a cat-like creature that often stays inside vending machines to warm the drinks to "body temperature". He sometimes uses mysterious powers to play tricks on Mesousa, such as dropping him into a hole appearing out of nowhere. Lord Cat almost always ends his sentences with the phrase "-desu nya". (Note: "Nya" is a Japanese onomatopoeia for the sound a cat makes (hence he actually says "Meow" in the English translation).) In each episode he appears with a different fur color, and in the final episode, there is a scene where he is constantly changing colors. When he is unable to watch the vending machines, he will ask others such as Mesousa to step in for him until his return. Lord Cat has a younger brother that looks nearly identical to him and who appears once late in the anime series.
Giant Salamander (オオサンショウウオ, Ōsanshōuo)
Voiced by: Sayaka Ohara, Asuka Nakase, Ai Nonaka, Sawa Ishige, Ryoko Shintani, Chieko Higuchi and Chiwa Saitō (Japanese);
Mariela Ortiz, Christine Auten, Monica Rial, Andy McAvin, Chris Issacs and Jason Moore (English)
Giant Salamander first appears in episode five; he is caught by Ichijō and fills in a spot for a camp member. When he speaks, his words appear above his head, and he ends his sentences with "-kero". When he disappears from the episode (usually by being eaten) and comes back, he usually has a new voice actor and body color.
Ichijō's Little Sister
Voiced by: Ai Nonaka (Japanese); Kira Vincent-Davis (English)
She debuts as a quiet, chibi version of Ichijō in episode 7 where she looks for her older sister. Afterwards, she appears mysteriously at random locations. She relies on drawing on a sketchpad to communicate, and likes to draw the girls as she sees their personalities. In the anime series, she and Ichijō are aware of the Aliens that monitor Becky and occasionally wave hello to them.
Raccoon Dog (タヌキ, Tanuki)
Voiced by: Natsuko Kuwatani (Japanese); Kira Vincent-Davis (Ep. 14), Allison Ashley (Ep. 16) and Kara Greenberg (Ep. 17, 18, 19 and 26) (English)
Based on the legendary raccoon dog creature, Raccoon is introduced in episode 14 as a potential meal caught by Ichijō. She can speak and also transform (Note: According to Japanese legends, raccoon dogs are said to be able to transform into humans by hiding their true face behind a leaf, and cheat people.) into students of Peach Moon academy. However, her transformation is not complete as she retains her raccoon dog face, to the amusement and annoyance of the students. However, there was one instance where she transforms into Behoimi as a braided, glasses-wearing girl, and successfully changes her face. Later, she joins the Intelligence Club as "004" and helps them complete their mission of finding Mesousa. When she speaks, she ends her sentences with "yansu".

== Other supporting characters ==
The Professor (教授, Kyōju)
Voiced by: Chō (Japanese); John Swasey (English)
Becky's professor at MIT. According to Becky's dialogues in manga, he covers linguistics, archaeology and mythology. In the anime, he made Becky and other 1-C members to attend on a field research in Okinodoku-shima (沖之毒島, Okinodoku Shima) with his assistant, Media. In some manga episodes, he took Miyako Uehara (1-C), whose mother has an acquaintance with him, to the research fields all over the world.
Michael (ミカエル, Mikaeru)
Voiced by: Takahiro Sakurai (Japanese); John Swasey (English)
Michael is a fat man in armor resembling "Sub-zero (Professor Tanaka)" from The Running Man. He calls himself an archangel and lives in Himeko's dream. In the anime, he attacked Momotsuki High students wandering in Himeko's dream. He appeared again in episode twenty-five as a messenger from "Ichijō-Matsuri". In manga, he also appeared in Rei's dream but he could not beat her like Himeko.
Yūki Akiyama (秋山 勇気, Akiyama Yūki)
Yūki is a younger brother of Otome Akiyama (1-B), and is a 9th grader of Inaba Junior High School (因幡中学校, Inaba Chūgakkō). He learns Kendo in a dojo that Tsurugi Inugami (1-D) once belonged to. He seems to be fallen in love with Media (1-D) at a first sight.
Kong (コング, Kongu)
Kong appeared in Himeko's excuse for being late for the class as a member of Becky's destroying Oni team, (Note: In a Japanese folklore Momotarō, a boy born from a peach beats the marauding Oni (demons or devils), accompanied with talking dog, monkey, and pheasant.) instead of the monkey. He resembles to B. A. Baracus (Mr. T) from The A-Team, and hates boarding airplanes.

=== Momotsuki Third Elementary School ===
The following characters appeared in the manga chapters and volumes during Becky's stay at the elementary school. Some of the characters were given voices in the drama CD.

Nozomi Ichijō (一条 望, Ichijō Nozomi)
Voiced by: Ai Nonaka
Ichijō's younger sister, who is more talkative and outgoing than her older sister. Though sometimes mischievous, she easily becomes Rebecca's first friend in Momotsuki elementary school.
Miyabi Inugami (犬神 雅, Inugami Miyabi)
Voiced by: Sawa Ishige
Tsurugi Inugami's younger sister, who has a shy personality, which is quite opposite of that of Nozomi Ichijō. She keeps her brother's photo with her.
Mahiro Asō (麻生 真尋, Asō Mahiro)
Voiced by: Ryōko Nagata
Mahiro is the homeroom teacher of Class 5-2. Although Mahiro is gentle towards her students, she is quite well known for her immature behaviors. And she sometimes disguises herself as her younger sister Maria to sneak into Momotsuki High.

== Spin-offs ==
=== Maro-Mayu ===
Maro-Mayu is a spin-off series from Pani Poni. Its storyline centers on Étoile, a café where Kurumi Momose works as a part-time waitress. The following characters are featured in Maro-Mayu and some of them make a brief appearance in episode eighteen of the anime series.

==== Café Étoile ====
The Shop Owner (店長, Tenchō)
Voiced by: Katsuyuki Konishi (Japanese); Eden Barrera (English)
The owner of Étoile is a male otaku in his 20-30s, who succeeded the café from his parents and willing to make it a moe café, but his attempt is not rewarded right now.
Magical Girly Cat (魔法少女猫, Majikaru Nyan Nyan)
Voiced by: Mika Kanai
A cat-like mysterious creature that resides in Étoile. It has many nicknames such as Nekomimi Maid Robot, Baka Neko, Meso Neko, etc.
Taeko (妙子, Taeko)
Voiced by: Hisayo Mochizuki (Japanese); Luci Christian (English)
Taeko is a little girl, who is an apprentice to a goddess of jinx. She has a black hair and wears a black robe. Kurumi and the owner of Étoile find her irresistibly cute or moe. Whenever she meets someone, she politely asks whether it is okay to put a jinx on the person.
Sasuke (サスケ, Sasuke)
He is a ninja character, who also appears in Ryoichi Koga's work Ninja Nonsense. He temporarily works for Café Étoile as a substitute for Kurumi. He has a serious work attitude.

==== Neighborhoods from Momotsuki Street ====
Master Carpenter (棟梁, Tōryō)
He is an Edokko, who is always in search of moe. He is a regular customer of Étoile, though the place seems to lack any traits of moe. He seems to loaf around all day.
The Owner of the Chinese Restaurant (中華屋の店長, Chūkaya no Tenchō)
The owner of the Chinese Restaurant in Momotsuki street, where Kurumi's classmate, Rei Tachibana, works as a part-time waitress in a mandarin gown. The owner is speculated to be an Overseas Chinese/Taiwanese as he speaks Japanese with a heavy Mandarin accent.
The Monster Family (妖怪家族, Yōkai Kazoku)
The Monster Family consists of Pem, Perra, and Pero. They are actually triplets as they were divided from a single cell. They have once kidnapped Kurumi in a cave. Of course they are a parody of Yōkai Ningen Bem.
Yamada (山田)
Yamada is an old man who calls himself a Toothless Alchemist (歯がねえの錬金術師, Hagane no Renkinjutsushi), a pun of Fullmetal Alchemist (鋼の錬金術師, Hagane no Renkinjutsushi). His grandson is a member of Kitakanto Tsuppari Union.
Kappa (カッパ)
Kappa seems to randomly appear out of nowhere. The plate on top of his head can be used to various purposes such as an ashtray.
The Salaryman (サラリーマン, Sararīman)
The Salaryman is always found in a public park. As he always seems to be depressed, he is speculated to be dismissed from his company.

=== Momo-Gumi!! ===
The following characters are featured in Momo-Gumi!!, a spin-off manga of Pani Poni series. It evolves around an idol group "Momo-Gumi", which consist of three high school girls: Yuna, Tsubasa, and Makapon. The group's keyword is "Aim for the Ace!!". While Yuna is regularly featured in Pani Poni story line, the rest makes a brief appearance in the episode six of Pani Poni Dash! anime series.

Yuna (ユナ)
She is Yūna Kashiwagi from Class 1-A.
Tsubasa (ツバサ)
She is de facto leader of Momo-Gumi!!. She has an appearance of a typical Japanese idol. Although she initially expresses much dislikes at Makapon, she eventually decides to just get over with her. Her real name has not been revealed.
Makapon (マカポン)
There is a big gap between her actual face and those in the published photographs, leading to an assumption that her face is always heavily edited in printed materials. She always seems to carry around some kind of explosives. Her real name is Kana Marume (丸目加奈, Marume Kana).

=== The Alternative Cure Magical Girl Behoimi-chan ===
Yamagishi (山岸, Yamagishi)
Yamagishi is the head of an event program company. He orders Behoimi to wear a Skull Mask costume.
Skull Mask (ドクロ仮面, Dokuro Kamen)
The Skull Mask is a villain character from a fictional tokusatsu television program Ultra Galactic War Excellion (超星戦騎エクセリオン, Chōseisenki Ekuserion). Behoimi fights as a magical girl with his costume.
Mirai Suzuhara (鈴原未来, Suzuhara Mirai)
She belongs to the class 5-2, Momotsuki Third Elementary School, the very class that once Becky belonged to, and she can transform into "the Magical Girl Behoimi", which is actually a different magical girl from the original Behoimi.
Salamander (サラマンダー, Saramandā)
Salamander is a Mirai's familiar spirit, who came down from a spirit world to help Mirai to fight against the evil in the name of the Magical Girl Behoimi. He has a strong resemblance to the Giant Salamander in Pani Poni.
Mermaid Princess (マーメイドプリンセス, Māmeido Purinsesu)
A small snake-like extraterrestrial creature that was rescued by Behoimi from a secret government laboratory. The creature lives in Behoimi's house and it speaks in an aristocratic tone. She can fuse with a human body in order to use its hidden power. Her favorite food is ice cream.
