= Coyote Ragtime Show =

Japanese anime television series

- Logo

コヨーテ ラグタイムショー (Koyōte Ragutaimu Shō)
- Genre: Adventure, girls with guns, science fiction
- Anime television series
- Directed by: Takuya Nonaka
- Studio: ufotable
- Licensed by: AUS: Madman Entertainment; NA: Crunchyroll
- Original network: Chiba TV
- English network: NA: Anime Network; UK: Propeller TV
- Original run: July 3, 2006 – September 18, 2006
- Episodes: 12
- Manga
- Written by: Tartan Check Team Coyote
- Published by: Jive
- English publisher: NA: Broccoli Books
- Magazine: Comic Rush
- Original run: 2006 – February 7, 2007
- Volumes: 3
- icon

Coyote Ragtime Show (コヨーテ ラグタイムショー, Koyōte Ragutaimu Shō) is a Japanese anime television series directed by Takuya Nonaka and produced by ufotable, which first aired in Japan on July 3, 2006. The storyline consists of the adventures of a group of space-faring fugitives in search of a treasure.

ADV Films acquired the North American rights to the anime Coyote Ragtime Show for $224,000 and has released all twelve episodes in this series on 3 DVDs. In 2008, the anime became one of over 30 ADV titles transferred to Funimation. In Australia and New Zealand, the series is distributed by Madman Entertainment. The manga was picked up by Broccoli Books, which managed to release two of its three volumes before closing its doors; the third volume was still listed on the Broccoli website as TBA. The future of the manga's English translation remains unknown.

== Story ==
The legendary Pirate King Bruce has been killed by Madame Marciano, the boss of the galactic criminal guild. His bequest to his young daughter Franca is ten billion space dollars hidden in a complex custom vault somewhere on the planet Graceland. However, Graceland is now in such a state of civil war that the president of the Milky Way Federation threatens to blow up the planet in a week. Mister, a notorious space pirate, his sidekicks Bishop and Katana, and his longtime rival Swamp must help Franca get to her inheritance before either Madame Marciano and her twelve android Assassins or detective Angelica Burns gets to them.

== Characters ==
=== Crew of the Coyote ===
Franca Dockley (フランカ・ドックリー, Furanka Dokkurî)
Voiced by: Ryō Hirohashi (Japanese); Brittney Karbowski (English)
Daughter of the Pirate King Bruce, she witnessed his death at the hands of Madame Marciano three years prior to the story. Despite her young age, she is a competent cook, runs the Pirate bar in Mister's absence and breaks up fights quickly and effectively. The cynical girl feels that Mister and the others are only using her because she knows where Bruce's treasure is buried. She carries a pendant given to her by Bruce that will lead her to the treasure.
Mister (ミスター, Misutâ)
Voiced by: Akio Ōtsuka (Japanese); John Swasey (English)
A criminal mastermind with so many aliases that he is simply called "Mister". He is proprietor of a bar called "Pirate" and captain of the starship "Coyote", named for his distinction as a coyote among space pirates. A jovial man even under pressure, his catch phrase is "Let's get this party started!" Still, he knows the gravity of the situation and is chasing Bruce' treasure not just for the fun of it, but to honour Bruce and keep a promise to Franca. The definition of a coyote is very important to Mister; it's more than not returning things you borrow, it's not giving up on friends and family.
Bruce Dockley (ブルース・ドックリー, Burûsu Dokkurî)
Voiced by: Hōchu Otsuka (Japanese); John Gremillion (English)
Transliterated as Blues by Broccoli (and this is most likely the intended spelling) but as Bruce by ADV. Bruce is the legendary "Pirate King" who stole ten billion space dollars from the impassable Central Bank. At the time, he had an incredibly high-paying job, which suggests that no matter how much work it was, he was a pirate for the thrill of it. Bruce cared a lot for his daughter Franca, and though his constant sidekick was Swamp, Mister seems to have known him the best, which is why he entrusted him with Franca's care. Bruce had an artificial eye that recorded all that he saw. He was killed three years ago by Madame Marciano.
Bishop (ビショップ, Bisshoppu)
Voiced by: Kenyū Horiuchi (Japanese); Lowell Bartholomee (English)
Part of Mister's group, also aboard the "Coyote." Bishop is a narcissist who does not take well to criticism, always getting in fights with Katana and Swamp. He also complains when his plans don't work or when he gets stuck with duties he doesn't like. Still, he's a reliable genius, even if a bit of a grouch, and he works well with his crewmates despite the fact that he can't get along with them.
Katana (カタナ)
Voiced by: Tomokazu Seki (Japanese); Chris Patton (English)
The young pilot and engineer of the "Coyote". Katana is known for reckless driving, having been arrested for undue care and attention at least fifty times. He doesn't take many things seriously, which annoys Franca and Bishop, but when he takes on a job, he'll carry it through to the end.
Swamp Gordon (スワンプ・ゴードン, Suwanpu Gôdon)
Voiced by: Katsuhisa Hōki (Japanese); Andrew Love (English)
This afro-wearing coyote was once called Pirate King Bruce's "right-hand man" (literally "right arm"). Because of this, he holds a grudge against Mister and does not understand why Bruce chose Mister instead of himself to take care of Franca. Since Bruce's death, Swamp has become a preacher and is loved by his community. He leaves home to join the crew of the Coyote in order to judge for himself whether Mister is worthy. Swamp notably does not appear in the opening or ending sequences, sometimes with noticeable gaps where he would logically be shown, but the reason for this is unclear.

=== The Milky Way Federation ===
Angelica Burns (アンジェリカ・バーンズ, Anjierika Bânzu)
Voiced by: Atsuko Yuya (Japanese); Christine Auten (English)
A private investigator from the Federation Bureau, Angelica is well aware of the government's corruption by the Criminal Guild. She has been chasing Mister for the past four years and has been fascinated with him since her early days as a traffic cop. It is only revealed much later in the series that she is actually in love with him, and it has partially served as a drive to continuously pursue and "arrest" him. Angelica is a notorious glutton with an apparently superhuman metabolic rate, although she may just be hypoglycemic.

Chelsea Moore (チェルシィ・ムーア, Cherushî Mûa)
Voiced by: Noriko Shitaya (Japanese); Monica Rial (English)
A young police detective sent to escort Angelica Burns through the planet of Sandvil. Once she learns of the corruption in the force, she quits her job and becomes Angelica's partner. Chelsea is somewhat of a dumb blonde, although she has an amazing memory and good connections mostly due to her looks. Chelsea appears to have dyslexia.
The President
Voiced by: Rokurō Naya (Japanese); Mark Laskowski (English)
The President of the Milky Way Federation, though a minor character, is important to the story in that he holds the fate of Graceland. He is as corrupt as his subordinates and answers to Madame Marciano, though he would never admit it publicly.

=== Criminal Guild ===
Madame Marciano (マルチアーノ, Maruchiâno)
Voiced by: Yōko Sōmi (Japanese); Kira Vincent-Davis (English)
Madame Marciano is a high-ranking official of the Syndicate "Guild" that operates above the law, but overthrew it, betraying the others, when her motives were questioned by "Guild" members. Untouched by investigators, she commands the 12 Sisters, a squad of hitwomen made up of her robotic "daughters." Marciano is a cold woman that does not seem to care for the Sisters' well-being. She is also the one responsible for the death of the "pirate king" Bruce 3 years before the story took place.
It is revealed in the last episode that Marciano is a cyborg and lost her ability to bear children because of this, which led to Nilsen's creation of the 12 Sisters. She seems to have had past relations with Bruce, or at least might regret having him killed, despite her denying this. She despises coyotes, believing that they robbed her of her dreams; in the final episode, Mister says that she was a coyote, but it is up for debate whether this means she was one in the past or whether he was saying that she was metaphorically the same as him.

Nilsen (ニルソン, Niruson)
Voiced by: Masakazu Itō (Japanese); Mike Vance (English)
This man is a scientist working for Marciano. He created the 12 Sisters and knows Marciano well, wondering if she regrets having Bruce killed. Nielsen gave the Sisters their clothes and always affirms Marciano's decisions.
Marciano's 12 Sisters (マルチアーノ12姉妹, Maruchiâno juuni shimai)
These "daughters" of Marciano are a robotic hit squad. They are named for the months of the Gregorian Calendar. The technological generations in which they were built are reflected by their apparent ages.
January (ジャニアリー, Zyaniarî)
Voiced by: Satomi Hanamura (Japanese); Luci Christian (English)
First generation. The most temperamental of the Sisters, January begins to disobey orders later in the series in favor of settling a personal grudge with the coyotes. She is, compared to the others, a horrible shot, even worse when she gets angry. In episode six, April has to keep her in line to make sure she doesn't kill anybody. Her weapons are dual FN P90 guns.
February (フェブラリー, Feburarî)
Voiced by: Rina Satō (Japanese); Cynthia Martinez (English)
Second generation. She has no weapon, as she was designed for information processing, battle plans, and direct communication with Marciano. She wears glasses.
March (マーチ, Mâchi)
Voiced by: Satomi Arai (Japanese); Natalie Nassar (English)
Second generation. March wields an FN Minimi and does not speak much, but appears often in the anime.
April (エイプリル, Eipuriru)
Voiced by: Hitomi Nabatame (Japanese); Sofia Mendez (English)
First generation, and the leader of the Sisters. She reports directly to Marciano. April cares deeply about her sisters but does not want to disappoint Marciano, whom she genuinely sees as a good mother. She appears calm and responsible most of the time, but can lose her temper as badly as January. With her gold-plated Luger pistol, she is an excellent shot.
May (メイ, Mei)
Voiced by: Yukiko Tamaki (Japanese); Allison Keith (English)
First generation. May is at first the cruelest of the Sisters, terrorizing humans with even less thought to their well-being than the others. However, when a shot from Mister beheads her and her still-working head is picked up by Angelica, May gives her information on where Mister is going in exchange for being returned to Marciano. Before she is retrieved, May turns to the side of good and helps Angelica and Chelsea. Her weapon, used once, is a Franchi SPAS-12.
June (ジューン, Jûn)
Voiced by: Chie Matsuura (Japanese); Allison Sumrall (English)
Second generation. A quiet and inexpressive girl wearing men's clothing, June was built for speed and specializes in close combat. She uses throwing knives and, on occasion, a machete.
July (ジュライ, Jurai)
Voiced by: Akiko Kawase (Japanese); Nancy Novotny (English)
Second generation. She appears sweet and harmless, and never stops smiling. In fact, she is the strongest of the sisters and perhaps, taking into account her perpetual smile, the most dangerous. She wields a katana.
August (オーガスト, Ôgasuto)
Voiced by: Kokoro Kikuchi (Japanese); Sasha Paysinger (English)
Third generation. A cute little girl, and very childish. She has a habit of drawing little hearts and wings on her Model 24 grenades.
September (セプ, Sepu)
Voiced by: Satomi Arai (Japanese); Melissa Pritchett (English)
First generation. Her efficiency in combat is average, but she excels at aim, even more so than April. Therefore, she uses an M14 rifle with M7 bayonet and acts as the group's sniper. September dresses as a French maid. She may be the first to recognize that Marciano isn't looking out for her robots' best interest, but in episode three, she meets an early end at the hands of Mister and Swamp.
October, November, December (オクト、ノヴェ、ディッセ, Okuto, Nove, D'isse)
Voiced by: Eriko Kigawa (Japanese); Jessica Boone (English)
Third generation. These three are identical triplets that appear to be five years old. Their weapons are Heckler & Koch MP5Ks, but they use their super strength more often. October, November, and December are very immature and, like August, always seem to be having fun. They think that their morbid job is a game, and are fixated on childish concerns. December has a habit of sleeping on the job.

== Media ==
=== Anime ===
The opening theme is "COYOTE" by Naoki ft. Power Sound while the ending theme is "Usuragu Kioku"|薄らぐ記憶|lit. "Fading Memories" by Sana.

| No. | Title | Original release date |
|---|---|---|
| 1 | "Prison Break"; Transliteration: "Datsugoku" (Japanese: 脱獄) | July 3, 2006 |
Federal Investigator Angelica Burns arrives on a distant planet searching for the criminal mastermind known as "Mister". Some information suggests that he is serving time in a local prison for a traffic violation. Arriving at the prison, she gets more than she bargained for, particularly when she learns that Marciano has sent her 12 Sisters after Mister, too.
| 2 | "The Girl from the Pirate Hideout"; Transliteration: "Kaizoku tei no Shoujo" (Japanese: 海賊亭の少女) | July 10, 2006 |
Mister, Bishop and Katana go to Mister's bar, "Pirate", and meet a young girl named Franca, daughter of the Pirate King Bruce, who has been taking care of it in his absence. Angelica and Chelsea meet a DJ that clues them in to Mister's location, while Marciano faces down her own Criminal Guild. Franca joins the crew of the ship "Coyote" with Mister and company.
| 3 | "The One They Called His 'Right-Hand Man'"; Transliteration: "Migiude to yobare ta otoko" (Japanese: 右腕と呼ばれた男) | July 17, 2006 |
The Coyote crew visit the "right arm" (think "right hand man") of Bruce, named Swamp Gordon. Swamp, an old rival of Bishop that also holds a grudge against Mister, has taken up a new occupation as preacher and pastor to a rural community. Mister tries to convince Swamp to join them, but Swamp has doubts. Angelica interrogates May, whose head she stole at Sandvil. Swamp joins the crew and kills September.
| 4 | "Bygone Days"; Transliteration: "Sugisarishi hibi" (Japanese: 過ぎ去りし日々) | July 24, 2006 |
May reveals to Angelica that both Marciano and Mister are headed to Graceland to get Bruce's treasure. The Coyotes watch a recording that Bruce made of the great robbery he and Swamp pulled off to get that treasure.
| 5 | "Never Change" (Japanese: ネバーチェンジ) | July 31, 2006 |
The Coyotes must get to the "Big Pink" gate at the Jupiter station to get to Graceland on time. They put on disguises to get past security check, and Angelica passes right by them. Franca feels unloved, but Mister promises her that after securing Bruce's treasure, they will go on vacation like a family. Just when the warp gate opens, Marciano attacks.
| 6 | "Fierce Fight"; Transliteration: "Gekitou" (Japanese: 激闘) | August 7, 2006 |
All three groups struggle to get through Big Pink on time. April is ordered to capture Mister alive, but January accompanies her in defiance of Marciano and tries to kill him. July kidnaps Franca, and Marciano takes her pendant with Bruce's recording inside. Angelica corners Mister, but lets him go to save Franca. Once he has done so, he collapses inside the Coyote from gunshot wounds as Katana races to escape Marciano's fire.
| 7 | "Marciano, the Traitor"; Transliteration: "Hangyaku no MARCIANO" (Japanese: 反逆のマルチアーノ) | August 14, 2006 |
The crew attends to Mister's wound, but Marciano destroys the Big Pink gate. Still, all three groups are confident that they can make it to Graceland. The Criminal Guild's assassin, Hunter Bennett, plans to impeach Marciano, but she blows up his entire fleet.
| 8 | "The Road to Gigabanks"; Transliteration: "GIGABANKS e tsuzuku michi" (Japanese: ギガバンクスへ続く道) | August 21, 2006 |
24 hours until the bomb on Graceland explodes with Bruce's treasure on it. Nielsen asks Marciano if she regrets killing Bruce. Angelica and Marciano both make it to Graceland, and Marciano sends the Sisters to find the treasure. Mister sends Bishop and Swamp to the peace negotiation that may keep Graceland from exploding. Swamp gives Mister a compass that leads the way to the treasure.
| 9 | "Jupiter" (Japanese: ジュピター) | August 28, 2006 |
Bishop and Swamp return to Jupiter and infiltrate the negotiations, where they learn that the real bomb is buried right next to the treasure. April and the triplets destroy the fake bomb, so the residents of Graceland believe that there is no threat. Mister, Katana and Franca arrive at Graceland, with Bishop and Swamp following. March captures Angelica, Chelsea and May.
| 10 | "Angelica Burns" (Japanese: アンジェリカ・バーンズ) | September 4, 2006 |
Bishop contacts Mister and tells him where the real bomb is. May gets a new body and Angelica and Chelsea are captured. Mister, Katana and Franca arrive where the treasure is buried, and now they just have to find it. Angelica breaks herself and Chelsea out of their cell and escapes with the help of May. Mister saves the detectives and tells Angelica that the bomb still exists, but she refuses to leave.
| 11 | "Fading Memories"; Transliteration: "Usuragu kioku" (Japanese: 薄らぐ記憶) | September 11, 2006 |
Mister and Franca enter Bruce's vault and find the treasure; there's a lot of money, to be sure, but the real treasure is heartwarming home videos of Bruce and Franca. Katana fights June while the rest of the Sisters and Marciano find their way to the treasure. Angelica realizes that she is in love with Mister.
| 12 | "Coyote" | September 18, 2006 |
The cavalry arrives just in time to cause a cave-in on the Sisters while Marciano and Mister fight to the death. Marciano reveals that she is a cyborg and used to be a Coyote, but felt betrayed by Mister and Bruce. Angelica blackmails the President for the code to deactivate the bomb, and sends the code to Mister, who saves the planet with seconds to go. Marciano is killed in a one-round ship battle with Mister.

== Reception ==
Jason Thompson, in his appendix to Manga: The Complete Guide, regards the manga as "one of the worst manga I've ever read".
