= Richard Haydock =

English physician

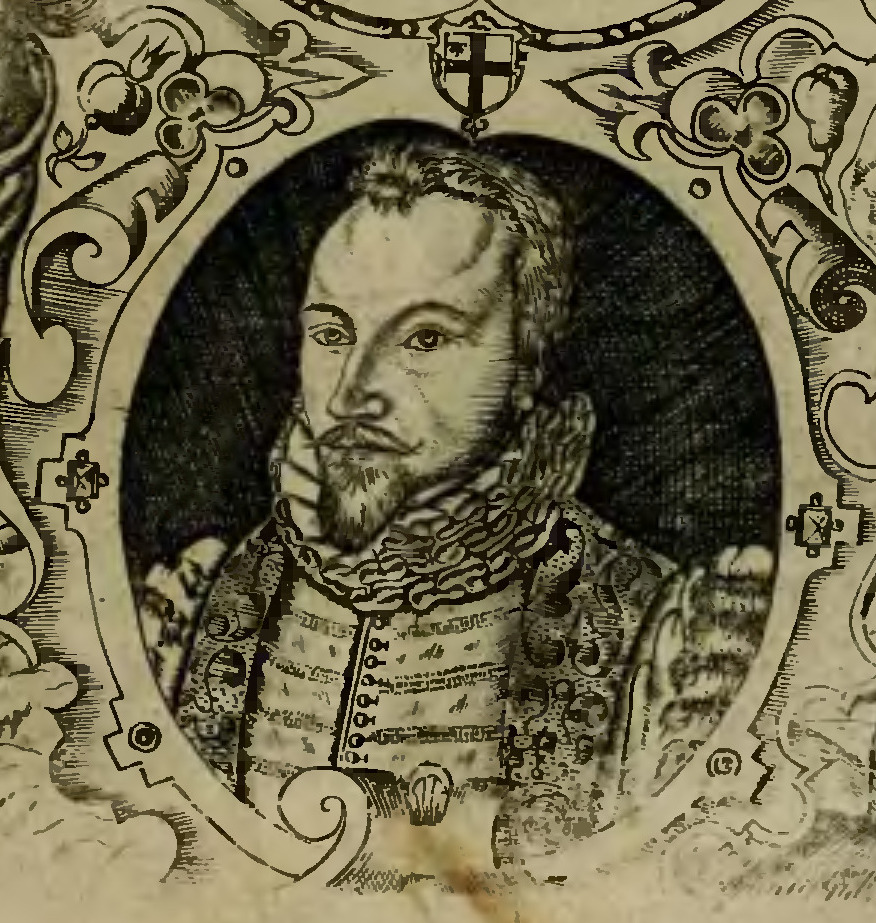
- Occupation: Physician

Richard Haydock (fl. 1605) was an English physician. He had the first recorded use of the term "cowlick" when he used it in his translation of Gian Paolo Lomazzo: "The lockes or plaine feakes of haire called cow-lickes, are made turning upwards."

== Biography ==
Haydock was born at Grewel in Hampshire. He was educated at Winchester College, and on 12 July 1588 matriculated at New College, Oxford, of which he was elected a fellow in 1590; he graduated B.A. 16 January 1592, proceeded M.A. 31 October 1595, and M.B. 14 June 1601 (Oxford Univ. Reg. vol. ii. pt. ii. p. 165, pt. iii. p. 169, Oxford Hist. Soc.) He travelled for some time on the continent, whence he returned to Oxford to study physic. In 1605 he left the university and settled in Salisbury, where he practised as a physician for many years. Arthur Wilson (Hist. of Great Britain, ed. 1653, p. 111) says that Haydock used to see visions in the night; that he would select a text in his sleep, and discourse on it in spite of pinchings, generally denouncing the pope and high church practices. He was summoned to court to exhibit his powers before the king, when he acknowledged himself an impostor, and, after a public recantation, was pardoned by the king, who offered him preferment in the church. Haydock did not, however, take orders, ‘but lived always a physician of good repute at Salisbury, and, retiring for a time to London, died, and was buried there, a little before the grand rebellion broke out’ (Wood).

Haydock's only publication is ‘A Tracte containing the Artes of curious Paintinge, Carvinge, and Buildinge, written first in Italian by Gian Paolo Lomazzo, painter of Milan, and Englished by R. H., student in Physik,’ Oxford, 1598, fol. It is dedicated to Thomas Bodley, esq., the founder of Oxford's ‘Pambiblion, or Temple to all the Muses.’
