= Cowlick =

Shape in human hair

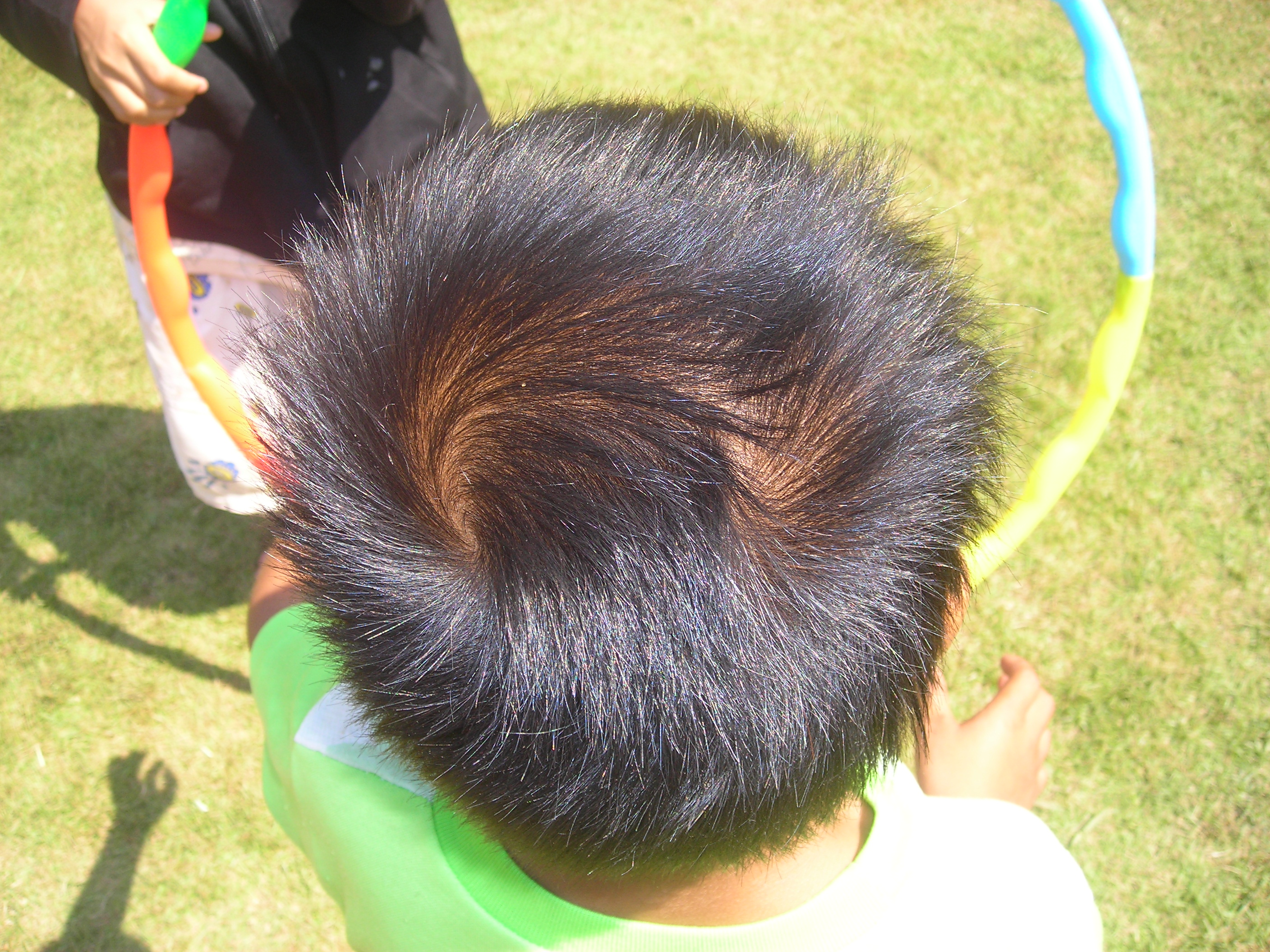
A child with a double crown

A cowlick is a section of human hair that stands straight up or lies at an angle at odds with the style in which the rest of an individual's hair is worn.

The most common site of a human cowlick is in the crown, but they can appear anywhere on the head. They also sometimes occur in the front and back of the head.

The term "cowlick" dates from the late 16th century, when physician Richard Haydock used it in his translation of Gian Paolo Lomazzo: "The lockes or plaine feakes of haire called cow-lickes, are made turning upwards." A less-used term with the same meaning is calf-lick.

== Management ==
Cowlicks are typically managed through hairstyling techniques, such as adjusting hair length, changing the direction of combing, or using styling products to reduce their appearance. In rare cases, permanent cosmetic procedures have been proposed to alter the direction of hair growth or the appearance of a cowlick. These include electrolysis, waxing, and cosmetic surgery, although such interventions are uncommon and their effectiveness for treating cowlicks has not been well established.

== See also ==
- Ahoge
- Hair whorl
- Hairy ball theorem
