= Natalie Nassar =

American actress

- Born: November 30, 1981 (age 44); Houston, TX, United States
- Occupation: Voice Actress

Natalie Nassar (born November 30, 1981) is an American voice actress for ADV Films. As such, she has been known in Pani Poni Dash! as the brainy student Miyako Uehara and in Coyote Ragtime Show for voicing the Criminal Guild assassin, March.

== Anime roles ==
- Coyote Ragtime Show - March
- Pani Poni Dash! - Miyako Uehara
