= List of Cardcaptor Sakura characters =

This article covers the major characters of Clamp's manga Cardcaptor Sakura and its respective anime and movies. The manga and anime focused on Japanese schoolgirl Sakura Kinomoto who finds the magical Clow Book in her father's basement study, accidentally unleashing the magical Clow Cards loose across her hometown Tomoeda. Dubbed the Cardcaptor by the cards' guardian Cerberus (better known as Kero-chan), Sakura must wield the Clow Staff to capture the card spirits and turn them back into cards for her use. Sakura is aided by her best friend and cousin Tomoyo Daidouji, who creates battle costumes for her as well as videotaping her ventures as Cardcaptor; and later by Syaoran Li, a Chinese boy who is a descendant of the Clow Cards' creator Clow Reed. The anime also introduced a fourth companion, Meiling Li (sometimes spelled as Meilin Li), Syaoran's cousin. The rest of the characters are mostly oblivious to Sakura's magical life, aside from her brother Toya who has his own magical powers, and later Eriol Hiiragizawa, who is a reincarnated Clow Reed.

The anime was dubbed into English by Nelvana under the title of Cardcaptors, with most of the character names changed to English ones with the exception of Sakura, Meilin, Kero, Mr. Terada, Wang Wei, Ruby Moon, Yue, and Clow Reed.

A large number of the characters reappear as alternate selves in Clamp's other series, Tsubasa: Reservoir Chronicle and xxxHolic.

== Main characters ==
=== Sakura Kinomoto ===
Voiced by: Sakura Tange

Sakura Kinomoto (木之本 桜, Kinomoto Sakura) is the heroine of Cardcaptor Sakura, named after the Japanese word for "cherry blossom". Her most defining character traits are her unyielding determination, caring nature and loyalty to her friends. Sakura is portrayed as a perceptively sweet, extremely energetic and cheerful character who is well-loved, pretty, cheerful, cute and at times naïve, clumsy, and clueless. Sakura is athletically gifted and skilled in sports at school, being an excellent runner and called the "best baton twirler in school" by her friends. She hates math and is openly phasmophobic. Sakura maintains a crush on Yukito Tsukishiro for most of the manga and anime, but when she finally confesses to Yukito, she is gently rejected by him. Then, when asked by Sakura, he reveals he has feelings for her big brother, Touya. Eventually, Sakura realizes she is actually in love with Syaoran, but doesn't realize her feelings until he first confesses his love for her. Although she fails to admit her feelings in the final episode, Sakura later manages to finally confess her love to Syaoran when he and Meiling return to visit in the series movie, Cardcaptor Sakura Movie 2: The Sealed Card.

The manga version of the events leading to Sakura and Syaoran's confessions is quite different. Following the duel with Eriol, Syaoran reveals to Sakura his feelings to her one afternoon after school; telling Sakura that he loves her and that she is the one he loves most of all. Taking in Syaoran's words, Sakura struggles to understand her own feelings for Syaoran before realizing that she feels the same way about him. Before he leaves for Hong Kong, Sakura gives Syaoran a teddy bear she makes for him and tells him that he is her Number One; the person she loves the most. Now knowing that Sakura feels the same way about him, Syaoran promises to return once he's finished his business in Hong Kong and desperately asks Sakura if she will wait for him, and she promises that she will. Over the next few years Sakura and Syaoran maintain a long-distance relationship (which was the focus of a bonus one-shot Clear Card manga story released only in Japan called "Until We Meet Again"); writing letters and making phone calls. However, he reunites with Sakura when she starts Middle School and reveals to her joy that he is back in Tomoeda for good. The two happily embrace, with a tearful Sakura proclaiming that from now on, they'll be together forever.

Sakura becomes the titular Cardcaptor by guardian beast Cerberus after accidentally opening and releasing the Clow Cards from the Clow Book. Aided by Cerberus, her best friend and cousin Tomoyo Daidouji, and later Syaoran, Sakura successfully captures all the cards and is named the new Clow Mistress by the cards' second guardian Yue (Yukito's true form). In the second half of the manga and anime, Sakura must use the power of her own star to transform the Clow Cards into Sakura Cards, or else the cards would lose their powers. In the beginning of the Clear Card arc, all the Sakura cards suddenly turn blank, losing their powers and while looking for a way to restore them, Sakura must capture new cards of an unknown origin that started appearing around town. She later learns that Syaoran was responsible for the Sakura cards' disappearance in a move to protect her, as her own power had grown too strong for her to control, leading to the creation of the Clear cards.

For all Japanese-language productions of the anime (including movies, audio CDs, and video games), Sakura is voiced by Sakura Tange. In the Animax English dub, she is voiced by Andrea Kwan. In the English dub of the second movie, she is voiced by Kari Wahlgren. In the English dub of the Clear Card arc, she is voiced by Monica Rial, who reprised her role as Sakura from Tsubasa: Reservoir Chronicle.

In the Nelvana English dub Cardcaptors, she is known as Sakura Avalon, though her given name is repronounced as "Sa-KU-ra" instead of "SA-ku-ra". She is voiced by Carly McKillip. In this version, she is portrayed as a more thick-skinned character than in the original anime, her initial romantic feelings for Yukito and fear of ghosts are removed, and later in the series she and Syaoran never developed their romance as it was heavily edited out.

The decision to have Sakura and Syaoran become a couple at the end of the series was popular amongst fans, with Nanase Ohkawa noting in a February 2001 interview that she was glad that the readers were happy that Sakura and Syaoran got together.

During a CLAMP Twitter Space discussion in April 2024, which took place a month after a special chapter of Clear Card was published in Japan (which was the last story reprinted in the final volume of Clear Card), CLAMP were asked if they had plans for another story arc, perhaps one about Sakura and Syaoran's wedding. Responding to the question, Nanase Ohkawa expressed her view that "it'd be best for everyone to imagine Sakura and Syaoran's wedding in their own hearts," but did not rule out a continuation of the story after the final volume of Clear Card.

=== Cerberus ===
Voiced by: Aya Hisakawa (temporary form), Masaya Onosaka (true form)

Cerberus (/ˈsɜːrbərəs/) (ケルベロス, Keruberosu) (Ancient Greek: Κέρβερος Kérberos [kerberos]), nicknamed Kero by Sakura; is the appointed guardian of the book which holds the Clow Cards, as well as the series' provider of comic relief. He is one of two magical creatures created by Clow Reed along with the Clow Cards. Before his death, Clow appointed Kero as the one to select the potential candidate to be the next master of the cards, Cerberus himself, and his "brother" and fellow guardian, Yue. After Sakura accidentally releases the cards, Cerberus chooses her to be the candidate and teaches her the basics of capturing the cards. Throughout the series, he displays an extensive knowledge of mysticism. After Sakura passes the Final Judgment to become the Clow Cards master, Cerberus remains with her as a friend, companion, adviser, and protector when new threats appear.

Having spent a lengthy amount of time in the book while it was in Osaka, Cerberus speaks with a pointed Osakan-accent. He tends to be bossy, demanding, egotistical and gluttonous, but clearly displays his affection for Sakura, especially if she is hurt or in danger. He becomes very fond of video games, and is addicted to sweets. Cerberus spends most of his time in a "temporary" or "false form": a small figure resembling an orange stuffed animal with wings. Unlike Yue, Cerberus' magical powers are like the sun, and thus largely self-sustaining, and he is subsequently not as dependent on his master's power to support his life as is Yue. However, his master must have control of the Firey and Earthy cards in order to power his true form, a large-winged mountain lion. In the anime adaptation, the Light card is changed to the Earthy card to delay his obtaining his true form. Cerberus' name is taken from the Greek mythological figure, Cerberus, a large three-headed dog who was assigned to guard the gates of the Greek underworld. In the bilingual Kodansha version of the manga, the name for Cerberus' borrowed form is Cero.

In the anime adaptation, his false form is voiced by Aya Hisakawa, while his hidden form is voiced by Masaya Onosaka. In the Animax dub, his false form is voiced by Sarah Hauser, whereas his true form is voiced by Darren Pleavin. In the Cardcaptors dub, his name is spelled Keroberos (based on the Japanese pronunciation of his name), and "Kero" was repronounced as "kirō" instead of "kerō". In this dub, his false form is voiced by Matt Hill with a New York accent, and Richard Newman voices his true form, though the accent is not as distinct. In the second film, he is voiced by Wendee Lee and Dave Wittenberg, in his respective forms. In the English dub of the Clear Card arc, Kero's false form is voiced by Mikaela Krantz and Kero's true form is voiced by Christopher Sabat.

Cerberus appears in Episode 44 of Tsubasa: Reservoir Chronicle in his borrowed form, although in the parallel world he dwells in it appears to be his singular body. Cerberus (using "Kero" as a nickname) guards the Country of Kero, and has a prophetic dream of Syaoran, Sakura, Fai, Kurogane and Mokona, the protagonists of Tsubasa, arriving in his world and recruits Mokona to climb up a mountain to retrieve one of Sakura's memory feathers which shrinks down the protagonists in size. Aya Hisakawa reprised her role as Cerberus for this character appearance, while Chris Cason provided his English voice.

=== Tomoyo Daidouji ===
Voiced by: Junko Iwao

Tomoyo Daidouji (大道寺 知世, Daidōji Tomoyo) is the best friend and primary assistant of Sakura Kinomoto, and her second cousin on their mother's sides. The daughter of the president of Daidouji Toy Company, Sonomi Daidouji (Sakura's aunt), Tomoyo is a person of good breeding and dignified bearing. She is svelte, sophisticated, and ladylike, and lives a life of wealth, watched over by a team of female maids and bodyguards. She has access to a variety of state of the art prototype technological gadgets from her mother's company, and supplies Sakura and Cerberus with different mobile devices throughout the series. Her most defining character traits include her attentiveness, integrity and selflessness towards Sakura's welfare, and her love of spoiling her friends.

Tomoyo initially comes off as a stereotypical "Ojou-san": a demure, wealthy, upwardly-mobile high-class female stock character, especially one with ancestry in the nobility or gentry. However, she is depicted as having exceptional emotional maturity. Tomoyo is hard-working, highly motivated, compassionate, intelligent, meticulous, giving her a unique air of cultured politeness, deportment, refinement, and etiquette amongst the cast. Tomoyo regularly speaks using more formal verb conjugations and expressions than normally seen among elementary students. She uses "watakushi" (わたくし), a first-person pronoun which, when used outside of formal situations, makes a character seem either "prim and proper," "cultured," or "snobby." Tomoyo is artistically gifted, having displayed talents as an amateur fashion designer, beautician, cinematographer, seamstress, choreographer, pianists and vocalist. Tomoyo is shown announcing, performing, or costume designing in various school events. In the anime, her musical ability causes her to be targeted by both the Voice and Song cards. When needed, Tomoyo can exhibit considerable perceptiveness, cunning and resourcefulness, most prominently displayed in The Sealed Card film.

Because Tomoyo lacks magical powers and athletic abilities, Sakura takes on a proactive protective responsibility most times when capturing or transforming cards. If Tomoyo is ever in danger (or missing), Sakura will be the one concerned for her most, and her focus changes from that of the Card at hand to prioritize Tomoyo's safety. Fortunately, Sakura has always succeeded, and hugs Tomoyo warmly whenever they reunite. Tomoyo states that she has absolute trust in her friend and faith in Sakura's "invincible spell", so she never feels distressed. Starting in Cardcaptor Sakura: Clear Card, Tomoyo began using a small camera-equipped drone to remove herself from unnecessary danger while documenting Sakura's exploits, so as not to worry Sakura.

Tomoyo is notable for her "fangirling", crafty streak, and obsession of documenting every single detail of Sakura's adventures and personal life on video as much as possible, much to Sakura's discomfort. When she learns of Sakura's new role as a Cardcaptor, she becomes her personal cheerleader, insists that Sakura must wear "special outfits", is responsible for choreographing Sakura's new action poses, and begins providing Sakura with the various "magical girl" protective costumes she wears during her captures, as well as accompanying her on magical (and non-magical) endeavors to record the events with her video camera. This "art project" seems to serve Tomoyo's personal benefit and enjoyment rather than improving Sakura's performance. However, she doesn't let her own desires supersede Sakura's needs and wants; she just wants to help Sakura and see her be happy. Tomoyo faithfully assists Sakura, keeps her new identity secret, and often covers for her in times of need.

In both the manga and anime adaptations, Tomoyo admits that she loves Sakura, but Sakura replies innocently, "I love you, too," in the platonic sense. This is emphasized using manga conventions: Tomoyo declares her love against a romantic background of language of flowers, while Sakura replies against a blank white background. In the manga, some scenes give the appearance that Tomoyo has a crush on Sakura's brother Toya; however, according to Volume 1 of Clamp no Kiseki: The Ultimate Collection, and an interview in the Cardcaptor Sakura Memorial Book, this was an error caused by one of the finishing artists not being aware that CLAMP intended for Tomoyo to have romantic feelings for Sakura. Later scenes show that Tomoyo recognizes that Toya and Sakura, being brother and sister, have the same ears, and that Tomoyo secretly blushed over Toya because his ears reminded her of Sakura. Although she loves Sakura, she encourages Sakura's love of Yukito, and later becomes Syaoran's confidante and wingman when he begins to fall in love with Sakura.

CLAMP stated that the reason that Sakura does not return her friend Tomoyo's feelings is not because Tomoyo is another girl, as Sakura does not consider sex or gender a barrier for her romantic attraction. She simply does not have romantic feelings for Tomoyo in particular.

Although not the actual character, two of Tomoyo's alternate forms make appearances in Cardcaptor Sakura's spiritual successor Tsubasa: Reservoir Chronicle, and three in the animated version.

In the anime adaptation, the character is voiced by Junko Iwao. In the Animax dub, she is voiced by Sarah Hauser for the first season, and later by Claudia Thompson. In the English dub of Cardcaptor Sakura Movie 2: The Sealed Card, her voice is supplied by Michelle Ruff. In the English dub of the Clear Card arc, Tomoyo is voiced by Natalie Hoover.

In the English adaptation Cardcaptors, Tomoyo is renamed Madison Taylor; she is voiced by Maggie Blue O'Hara, and her elegant speech is replaced with valley girl speech, similar to O'Hara's portrayal of Kitty Pryde in X-Men: Evolution. J.D. Considine of The New York Times called Tomoyo "creepy" and said it was "no wonder" that she had been changed so heavily in the adaptation.

=== Touya Kinomoto ===
Voiced by: Seki Tomokazu

Touya Kinomoto (木之本 桃矢, Kinomoto Tōya) is Sakura's older brother. His birthday is February 29. Though he teases her frequently, he cares a great deal for her and works to protect her. He is fully aware of what she is doing as a Cardcaptor, and regularly takes on several part-time jobs that put him in a position to be nearby when she is working on capturing a card. He is also known for being a chick magnet, a status only reinforced by the fact that he never dates or actively shows romantic interest in anyone. He disliked Syaoran and often holds a grudge against him, but deep down he thought to himself that if there was someone Sakura should be with it would be Syaoran. Touya possesses several magical powers, including the ability to see ghosts and other non-humans, the ability to sense when Sakura is in danger, and mild precognition. He has an extremely close relationship with and love for his best friend Yukito; as the series progresses, it becomes increasingly clear that he is aware that Yukito is Yue's alter ego. To save both Yukito and Yue, Touya becomes a normal human being after he gives all of his magical powers to Yue, making him promise to protect Sakura in his stead as well as himself (and, by extension, Yukito). It is also hinted in the Clear Card arc that Touya and Yukito are now in a relationship, which was confirmed by a member of CLAMP in 2022.

In the Japanese anime adaptation, Touya is voiced by Seki Tomokazu. In the English manga his name is spelled "Toya". In the Animax dub, he is voiced by Darren Pleavin for the first season. In the English adaptation Cardcaptors, his name is changed to Tori Avalon and he is voiced by Tony Sampson. In the English dub of the second film, Kirk Thornton takes over the voicing role. In the English dub of the Clear Card arc, Touya is voiced by Clifford Chapin.

=== Yukito Tsukishiro / Yue ===
Voiced by: Megumi Ogata

Yue/Yukito are an independent dissociative personality: Yukito is a "false" persona created to mask Yue's "true" identity. For most of the series, Yue remained in a "state of hibernation"; Yukito is unaware of Yue's existence, though he maintains an enormous appetite for food in an unconscious attempt to give Yue power. Yue's existence is revealed to the other characters after all of the Clow Cards are collected, and Toya states he knew of Yue's existence all along and was just waiting for Yukito to tell him himself.

Yukito Tsukishiro (月城 雪兎, Tsukishiro Yukito; nicknamed 'Yuki' by Toya, and 'Yuki-usagi' by Kerberus) is the best friend and later boyfriend of Sakura's older brother, Touya, and the human alter-ego of the Clow Card guardian, Yue. Though he is certainly Yue's "temporary form", he is referenced several times by other characters (including Eriol and Yue himself) as being simultaneously a completely separate "heart" from Yue's "true form". As Yukito, he displays a kind and gentle nature, vaguely feminine, yet with a clearly masculine stature, and at the start of the series, Sakura develops a strong limerence towards him. When she confessed her feelings, he gently rejects her, shortly revealing he has feelings for Touya, her brother.
Once Sakura collects all of the cards, Yue begins needing greater power as her magic isn't strong enough to sustain him. Subconsciously, Yukito begins eating even more to try to compensate, but it is not enough and he starts sleeping constantly, even while standing, and eventually finds his body fading away altogether. Once Touya gives his magical energy to Yue to sustain them, Yukito begins to grow aware of Yue's existence; the grandparents with whom Yukito thought he lived were a false memory and thus did not exist. It is suggested that he came into existence shortly before he met Touya, to be near the future new guardian of the Clow Cards. Eriol tells Yue that he (and Clow) did know Sakura was predestined to be the future master of the cards, and had predicted that Sakura and Yue would be romantically involved with each other; however, Yukito had deviated from this prophetic vision by falling in love with Touya.
In Clear Card, it is hinted that Toya and Yukito are in a relationship, but this is never actually confirmed in the story. In 2022 however, CLAMP member Satsuki Igarashi confirmed that Toya and Yukito are now a couple in the sequel.
Yue (月; Chinese Pinyin: Yuè) is the one of two Guardians of the Clow Cards, along with Cerberus. His name, which is written in kanji rather than hiragana is the Mandarin Chinese word for "moon". Whereas Cerberus is the elector of the new Clow Card Master, Yue is the judge who is allowed to test the candidate for their worthiness. He spends most of the series in his temporary form, Yukito Tsukishiro, who initially has no memory or knowledge of his other self. Unlike Cerberus, Yue's powers are heavily dependent on the power of his master. Sakura's power is not yet strong enough to sustain him after he awakens, particularly after she begins transforming the Clow Cards into Sakura Cards. Yue's growing need for power is reflected in Yukito's ravenous appetite and later constant sleeping. Similarly, the deficit affects Yue himself in instances such as the blatant failure of his magic which causes Sakura and him to fall out of the sky during one of Eriol's synthesized 'situations'. Eventually, Sakura's brother Toya reveals that he knows Yue and Yukito are not human and gives his power to Yue to sustain his existence so he does not lose Yukito.
As with Ruby Moon, Yue's "true form" has no biological sex or gender; though not "human or male", Yue has the appearance of a beautiful "angelic-bishōnen" young man with long, silver, braided hair, silver-purple feline eyes, and a pair of white angel wings which he uses for flight. Yue sports a white suit and spats-like coverings on his feet. His personality is depicted as serious and aloof in contrast to both Kerberos's and Yukito's, and while those two are very fond of Sakura, Yue is reluctant to accept her. Similarly, Yue displays no hint of Yukito's fondness for Li or his love for Touya. As the series progress, he comes to respond to Sakura's request that rather than being his master, she wants to be his friend. Yue has jurisdiction over the elements wind and water, as well as any cards that can be said to have a connection to the moon, wind or water. This includes the Wood, Time and Dark cards.
Unlike Kerberos, Yukito and Yue are usually voiced by the same actor, albeit with slightly modified performances. In the Japanese anime adaptation Yukito/Yue is voiced by Megumi Ogata. In the Animax dub, Yukito/Yue is voiced by Candice Moore. In Cardcaptors, Yukito's name is changed to Julian Star, his love for Touya is removed, and he is voiced by Samuel Vincent. In the English dub of the second movie, he is voiced by Steve Staley. In the English dub of the Clear Card arc, Yukito/Yue is voiced by Justin Briner.

=== Syaoran Li ===
Voiced by: Motoko Kumai

Syaoran Li, sometimes spelled as Shaoran Li or originally as Xiaolang Li (李小狼 Lǐ Xiǎoláng; リ・シャオラン Ri Syaoran, or Ri Syaoran (Kunrei); Cantonese Jyutping: lei5 siu2 long4), is the love interest of the Japanese manga series Cardcaptor Sakura, created by CLAMP.

A member of the Li clan of sorcerers from Hong Kong, whom are distant relatives of Clow Reed, the creator of the Clow Cards, he initially rivals against Sakura because he believes that he should be the one to inherit the Clow Cards and tries to capture the cards for himself. As the series progresses, however, Syaoran comes to respect Sakura and becomes her friend and ally. He eventually falls in love with her, though she is slow to realize it due to her own feelings for Yukito.

Originally, Syaoran appeared smitten with Yukito, but later revealed that the attraction was due to high moon power inside of Yukito. Eventually, in the beginning of the third season, Syaoran finally begins to realize he has deeply fallen in love with Sakura, as he constantly blushes whenever he is around her. In the manga, Syaoran begins to develop feelings for Sakura around the time of the Erase Card's capture. Once Syaoran realizes his feelings, he tries to admit his love for Sakura several times, but is both too nervous to confess his feelings while also being constantly interrupted. Syaoran also becomes extremely jealous whenever he sees Sakura spending time with Eriol, believing he harbours romantic feelings for Sakura and considers him a rival. Syaoran's love for Sakura is proven to be really strong as he thinks strongly of her well-being and needs before his own as shown when after Yukito rejects Sakura's feelings, Syaoran comforts her even though Sakura is still unaware about his own romantic feelings towards her. Nearing the end of the series, Syaoran finally confesses his feelings to Sakura, but decides to return to Hong Kong, since Sakura has now become the new master of the cards.

In the series movie, Cardcaptor Sakura Movie 2: The Sealed Card, he and Meiling return from Hong Kong a few months later to visit. Throughout the movie, Syaoran waits for Sakura to reply to his confession, but as Sakura constantly keeps trying to tell him how she feels, they are repeatedly interrupted. Syaoran and Sakura work together to defeat the Nothing Card that has been secretly stealing the Sakura cards while making parts of Tomoeda disappear. Eventually at the end of the movie, they manage to defeat the Nothing Card, which becomes the Hope Card and Sakura finally confesses her love for Syaoran and jumps into his arms.

Two years later, Syaoran returns to Tomoeda and enrols at the same middle school as Sakura and most of her friends. However, part of his reason for returning is to watch over Sakura and help her with the mystery surrounding the Clear Cards. He also keeps contact with Eriol, who instructs him to not interfere until the time is right. Later he reveals to Sakura that he was the one who took away the spirits contained within the Sakura Cards in order to protect herself from her own power, which is growing out of control, thus leading to the creation of the Clear Cards. Sakura is deeply upset at learning this, due to the fact that Syaoran risked his own life by doing this, and breaks down at the thought of something bad happening to him. She also sadly thinks that this was the reason he came back to Japan sooner than he said he would in a previous letter to Sakura; indirectly saying to Syaoran that she thinks he returned out of a sense of duty and not out of love and wanting to be with her. Knowing what Sakura is implying, Syaoran is taken aback and says to Sakura that his mission was only part of the reason he came back so soon, he just wanted to see her again as soon as possible; leaving Sakura happy and reassured about Syaoran's love for and desire to be with her. Syaoran also intends to reveal the truth about Kaito to Sakura, but he becomes unable to tell her anything about Akiho or Kaito's involvement due to a spell Kaito places on him.

Syaoran manages to catch several cards by playing a major role in helping Sakura seal them. He is allowed to attempt the final judgment but fails. Syaoran is shown to have similar powers to Sakura, such as sensing Clow Cards and magical auras, is a skilled martial artist, and wields a sword which he can use to cast spells when equipped with incantation papers. He can also use a device (dubbed a "lasenboard" in the Cardcaptors anime dub), which can detect and direct him to magical entities. A running gag is Kero calling him "kid".

Syaoran is voiced by Motoko Kumai in the Japanese version. In the Animax English dub, he is voiced by Candice Moore. In the Nelvana English dub, he is voiced by Mona Marshall in the second feature film. In Funimation's English dub of Clear Card, he is voiced by Jason Liebrecht, who reprises his role as Syaoran from Tsubasa: Reservoir Chronicle.

In Cardcaptors, Syaoran's name is listed as Li Showron, and he is voiced by Rhys Huber during the Clow Cards arc and the first movie, and Jordan Kilik in the Sakura Cards arc. He is introduced as the male lead in the first episode of the dub (episode 8 of the original anime), and is considered a rival Cardcaptor. He is more abrasive and blunt than in the original anime version. Instead of being infatuated with Yukito, he is shy. He also does not develop a romantic interest in Sakura and is not close to telling her his feelings like he does in episode 69, one episode before the finale.

=== Meiling Li ===
Voiced by: Yukana

Meiling Li (李莓鈴 Lǐ Méilíng, リ・メイリン Ri Meirin, Cantonese Jyutping: lei5 mui4 ling4), sometimes spelled as Meilin Li, is Syaoran Li's cousin and fiancée, and only appears in the anime adaptation of Cardcaptor Sakura. Introduced towards the end of episode 19, she is a very pretty, straightforward, clingy, and confident girl. As children living in Hong Kong, Meiling and Syaoran trained in martial arts under the tutelage of Wang Wei. One night her pet bird escaped from its cage, and the normally quiet and withdrawn Syaoran told her not to cry, then left. After spending hours in the rain, he returned with the bird and Meiling was both grateful and touched. From that day, she devoted herself to him, eventually declaring that she liked Syaoran above all others and, reasoning that he liked her as well, she declared them to be engaged, much to Syaoran's chagrin. At the same time, she promised that if he found someone he liked more than her, he would tell her and she would release him from the promise.

In coming to Tokyo, Meiling intends to help Syaoran find and gather the Clow Cards, and actively dislikes Sakura. As the series progresses, Meiling develops a grudging respect for Sakura that turns into a good friendship by the time Meiling returns to Hong Kong in episode 43 by her mother for unknown reasons. During her initial visit, Meiling seemed to recognize that Syaoran was falling in love with Sakura, but it wasn't until she briefly returned in episode 60 that she acknowledges and accepts Sakura as the person Syaoran loves. Wanting to keep her promise, Syaoran attempts to tell her that he loves Sakura, but Meiling interrupts and tells him that she knows because he is now calling Sakura by her first name, something he only does for his sisters and her. She releases Syaoran from their promise, then quickly leaves. Meiling spends the night at Tomoyo Daidōji's house and releases all of her frustration by crying without burdening Syaoran. At the end of the episode, Meiling returns home and is not seen again in the main series. She returns in the second movie, with Syaoran, to see her old friends, but actually secretly came back to help Sakura finally confess her love to Syaoran. Meiling also occasionally appears in the anime adaptation of Clear Card, talking to Sakura on the phone and giving her hints at developing her relationship with Syaoran. A running gag is Kero calling her "brat."

Along with her temporary stay in Tomoeda and being supportive of Syaoran, Meiling also plays a limited role in the story because, unlike Syaoran, she has no magical abilities, relying solely on her physical fighting abilities and a healthy dose of pride. Her lack of powers and tendency to leap before thinking, however, results in her hindering more than helping Syaoran in most battles against the cards. She challenges The Fight card in episode 20, and was nearly badly wounded and had to be rescued by Syaoran. Recognizing that she was being a burden, Meiling grew upset and lashed out at Syaoran. However, she was then able to be an aid to him while fighting The Twin card, as their years of practicing martial arts together enables them to match the card's synchronized fighting style.

In Clear Card episode 13, Meiling matured and is much less of a brat than she used to be. Even Sakura is amazed to see Meiling speak so politely to Fujitaka, to which Meiling responds, "It's just good manners,"

Meiling's signature hairstyle is the Chinese niújiǎotóu (牛角头).

In the Japanese version of the anime adaptation, Meiling is voiced by Yukana. In the Animax English dub, she is voiced by Sarah Hauser. In the English dub of the second movie, she is voiced by Julie Maddalena. In the English dub of the Clear Card arc, she is voiced by Trina Nishimura.

In the English adaptation Cardcaptors, she is known as Meilin Rae and is voiced by Nicole Oliver. Her unrequited engagement with Syaoran was omitted along with the fact that she and Syaoran were cousins. Rather she is portrayed as a long time friend of Syaoran and her romantic feelings toward him were watered down but still evident.

== Recurring characters in manga ==
=== Clow Reed ===
Voiced by: Kazuo Hayashi

Clow Reed (クロウ・リード, Kurō Rīdo) is the sorcerer who originally created the Clow Cards, and their magical guardians Cerberus and Yue. Along with Kohaku of Wish, and Yuuko of xxxHolic, he is one of the few Clamp-created characters to appear in more than one work.

Born of an English father and a Chinese mother, Clow created a new type of magic that blended both Eastern and Western magical elements. His plan was to hand down the magic to people who would use and protect it while meeting all of the qualifications. However, few people could learn his brand of magic. The character of Clow is only seen in flashbacks, as he has long been dead before the series starts. Few details are revealed about his character, personality, or life, though multiple characters comment on his eccentricity. He displays a gentle and affable personality in his interactions with his creations.

When Clow knew he was about to die, he chose his then-unborn descendant Sakura Kinomoto to become the new guardian of the cards and the new master of Yue and Cerberus. Clow's magical ability allowed him to foresee most of the future and plan many of the situations that would enable Sakura to succeed in taking full possession of the Clow Cards. Likewise, he deliberately made the sealing wand pink, reflecting that its future user would be a young girl. He also split his soul into two reincarnations: Eriol Hiiragizawa, who had all of his memories and magic, and Fujitaka Kinomoto, Sakura's father. In the anime adaptation, Clow does not split his soul, instead passing on his memories, soul and powers to Eriol exclusively. Syaoran Li is also an indirect descendant of Clow's Chinese lineage.

In the anime adaptation and the film, he is voiced by Kazuo Hayashi. In the Animax English dub, he is voiced by Darren Pleavin. In Nelvana's English adaptation, Cardcaptors, his given name is repronounced as "klau̇" instead of "klō", and is voiced by Dale Wilson. Clow Reed also appears in two additional CLAMP works, Tsubasa: Reservoir Chronicle and xxxHolic, where he has another descendant named Fei-Wang Reed and worked with the Dimensional Witch Yūko Ichihara in arranging the series of events in the former series.

=== Fujitaka Kinomoto ===
Voiced by: Hideyuki Tanaka

Fujitaka Kinomoto (木之本 藤隆, Kinomoto Fujitaka) is the father of titular character Sakura Kinomoto and her brother Touya Kinomoto. A busy professor of archaeology at Towa University, Fujitaka is a kind and caring father. He met his late wife Nadeshiko while doing his first year as a teacher at her high school. Nadeshiko had climbed a tree to return a baby bird to its nest, but fell out of the tree, landing on Fujitaka. Upon seeing her, he stated that "an angel has fallen from the sky." They fell in love and married when she was sixteen. Though Nadeshiko died seven years before the start of the series, Fujitaka is shown to still be very much in love with her and devoted to her memory. He keeps a picture of her in the dining room, changing it each morning.

Little is initially said about Fujitaka's family or past. During the second half of the series, it is revealed that when Clow Reed divided his soul (seeking to no longer be the most powerful magician in the world), he split it into two halves. One of these halves became Eriol Hiiragizawa, holding all of Clow's magic and memories, and the other being Fujitaka, who has no magic of his own, but fathered the one who would inherit the cards. It is stated that Fujitaka has no magical powers of his own, but he is also unaffected by other Clow's magic, such as the Eriol's sleep spell. At the end of the series, Eriol gives half of his magic to Fujitaka. This enables Fujitaka to finally see the spirit of Nadeshiko, who has been watching over her family since her death.

In the anime adaptation, Fujitaka's role as the other half of Clow Reed's reincarnation is completely removed as is his immunity to Eriol's magic and he is never able to see Nadeshiko's spirit. He is voiced by Hideyuki Tanaka. In the Cardcaptors dub, his name is changed to Aiden Avalon and he is voiced by Brian Drummond. In the Animax dub, he is voiced by Scott Evans. In the English dub of the second movie, he is voiced by Michael McConnohie. In the English dub of the Clear Card arc, Fujitaka is voiced by Jason Douglas.

=== Sonomi Daidouji ===
Voiced by: Miki Itō

Sonomi Daidouji (大道寺 園美, Daidōji Sonomi) is the mother of titular character Sakura's best friend and cousin Tomoyo Daidouji, the first cousin of Sakura's late mother Nadeshiko Kinomoto and Sakura's aunt. She is rarely seen in the series, but is said to be an extremely wealthy career woman and the President of a large toy corporation. Sonomi's childhood relationships mirrors her daughters': she was inseparable and greatly loved her cousin Nadeshiko, and disapproved of her marriage to Fujitaka, later blaming Fujitaka for Nadeshiko's death at a young age. During the marriage, it is implied that Nadeshiko was at least partially disowned and cut off from her family. Sonomi maintains a pixie cut, a hairstyle Nadeshiko loved giving her when they were kids; and has Tomoyo keep her hair long because it reminds her of Nadeshiko's beautiful bright gray-lavender hair.

After meeting Sakura for the first time, Sonomi realizes that Nadeshiko had lived a happy life and is able to come to terms with the marriage. At times, she still treats Fujitaka as a "romantic rival" competing to love Nadeshiko's affections, but she also helps him pass on gifts from Sakura to her grandfather and to arrange for Sakura to meet her great-grandfather while on a family vacation. Sonomi shows great affection for Sakura–treating her like her own daughter–and often clears her busy work schedule to join her and Tomoyo whenever Sakura comes over to visit.

In the Cardcaptors English adaptation, her name is changed to Samantha Taylor and her declaration of love for Nadeshiko is modified to a purely familial love rather than a romantic love.

Sonomi is voiced by Miki Itō in anime series. In the Animax English dub, she is voiced by Claudia Thompson for the first season. She is voiced by Venus Terzo in the Cardcaptors dub and by Wendee Lee in the English dub of the second movie. In the English dub of the Clear Card arc, she is voiced by Michelle Rojas.

=== Nadeshiko Kinomoto ===
Voiced by: Yūko Minaguchi

Nadeshiko Kinomoto (木之本 撫子, Kinomoto Nadeshiko) is Sakura and Toya's mother, Fujitaka's late wife, and the first cousin of Sonomi Daidouji. She worked as a model from her teens up until her death. She was sixteen when she met Fujitaka when he worked as a student teacher at her high school. She met Fujitaka when she climbed a tree to rescue a bird nest and accidentally fell, and landed on him as he saved her from getting hurt. He then remarked, "l had thought an angel fell from the sky". With those words, she fell in love with him. Soon after, against the wishes of her family, they got married despite their nine-year age gap (he was 25, she was 16). She died from an unnamed illness when Sakura was three. Because she was 27 when she died and Sakura was three and Toya was ten, it is likely that she gave birth to Toya at 17. Although she has died, she is still very much remembered and loved by her family; Fujitaka keeps her picture in the family room and Sakura never fails to greet her photo every morning. She appears occasionally as a spirit and is seen only by Toya, Eriol, and Sakura (beginning with volume 4 of the Clear Card arc).

Nadeshiko is voiced by Yūko Minaguchi in the anime series. In the Animax English dub, she is voiced by Candice Moore. In the Cardcaptors English adaption, her name is changed to Natasha Avalon and she is voiced by Janyse Jaud. In the English dub of the Clear Card arc, she is voiced by Megan Shipman.

=== Yoshiyuki Terada ===
Voiced by: Tōru Furusawa (season 1), Katsuyuki Konishi (season 2-3)

Yoshiyuki Terada (寺田 良幸, Terada Yoshiyuki) is a teacher at Tomoeda Elementary School. During the series, as the main characters go through fourth grade, and enter the fifth grade, he acts as their home room teacher. He is also shown teaching in other classes, including the physical education classes, and he acts as the chaperone on several school field trips. As the series progresses, it is revealed that he is having a romantic relationship with his student Rika Sasaki. In the manga, they become engaged when he gives her a ring, noting that he hopes it will one day become her wedding ring. Rika gives him a teddy bear she made and named after herself, which legends says will allow them to remain in love forever. Towards the end of the series, when Sakura is unsure of her feelings about Syaoran, the couple is shown having a picnic at a park, with Terada slipping away so Sakura doesn't notice him. During the series, none of the other characters appear to know about the relationship, though when Rika is taken over by the Sword card, Sakura hears her call out "Sensei" (teacher) when she uses the Illusion card to show Rika her most beloved.

In the anime adaptation, their relationship is not shown in the same light. Their engagement and more romantic scenes between them are removed, and Rika notes that Terada reminds her of her absentee father. Terada is also shown accepting cakes made by Rika and in accepting the bear and naming it after his "hardest working student." In the Cardcaptors English dub, he is simply called Mr. Terada, and all aspects of the romantic relationship between Terada and Rika are completely removed, with Rika's shyness and reactions to him made to appear to be more of a general fear of men than romantic feelings.

In the anime series, he is voiced by Tōru Furusawa for the first season and first movie, and by Katsuyuki Konishi for the second and third seasons and the second film. In the Cardcaptors dub, he is voiced by Brian Drummond. He is voiced by Steven Blum in the English dub of the second movie. In the English dub of the Clear Card arc, he is voiced by Zach Bolton.

=== Rika Sasaki ===
Rika Sasaki (佐々木 利佳, Sasaki Rika) is a classmate and friend of titular character Sakura Kinomoto. She is considered to be very elegant and mature for her age, though she can also be shy. During the series, she is also shown to be a skilled cook and very good at crafts. During the series, Rika is affected by the Clow Cards several times. Early in the series, she buys a brooch that is actually The Sword card. The card takes her over and causes her to attack Sakura. Sakura is able to stop Rika by using The Illusion card to show her an image of her beloved (or greatest fear in the English dub), allowing Sakura to capture the card. During the second half of the series, she is nearly drowned during a magical trial Eriol Hiiragizawa created to cause Sakura to convert a Clow Card to Sakura Card.

During the series, Rika is shown to be in a romantic relationship with her teacher Yoshiyuki Terada. In the manga series, they are engaged to be married when she is old enough, and they frequently spend time alone together on "dates." In the anime adaptation, the engagement is removed as are many of their dates, however they are still shown to have affection for one another (it's implied that he reminds her of her father, who's oft busy on overseas business). Rika gives Terada the hand-made teddy bear she made, and he names it after her. In both the manga and anime, when Sakura uses the Illusion card to stop Rika's attacks induced by the Sword card, she calls the image "Sensei" which means "teacher" in Japanese. During the final judgment when Yue shows Sakura a world where everyone has lost their feelings for the one they love the most, Rika is shown handing Terada a paper without her usual blush and shy look.

After graduating from Elementary School, Rika is the only among Sakura's friends who enrolled in a different Junior High School, and thus is not seen with them in Clear Card, although they usually keep in touch.

In the Cardcaptors English adaptation, Rika's name is translated as Rita and all hints of her relationship with Terada are removed. Instead of being a good student, she is depicted as having trouble with her school work and her blushing around Terada is explained away as being embarrassed at having to stay after school so often and that she is afraid of him.

In the original anime series, she is voiced by Tomoko Kawakami. In the Clear Card arc, she is voiced by Saki Fujita. In the English Cardcaptors dub and the second film, she is voiced by Dina Sherman. In the English dub of the Clear Card arc, she is voiced by Alex Moore.

=== Takashi Yamazaki ===
Takashi Yamazaki (山崎 貴史, Yamazaki Takashi) is a classmate and friend of Sakura Kinomoto and Syaoran Li. He is infamously known for fabricating highly detailed stories on the supposed history of practically any subject, usually whatever Sakura and her friends happening to be discussing. Sakura and Syaoran are often gullible enough to believe the stories, which often provide an element of humour in the series. His stories are primarily interrupted by Chiharu, who physically disciplines him by strangling him until he stops talking and will resort to dragging him away when she proves to be unsuccessful. His storytelling is later supplemented by Eriol, who helps to reinforce the false validity of his stories and whose presence prevents Chiharu from stopping Yamazaki's lies. Notably, Yamazaki's eyes are almost never open, causing Meiling to hypothesize that he only opens his eyes when telling the truth, a hypothesis that is later proven false.

While generally viewed as lighthearted and energetic, Yamazaki can also be sensitive and serious. In the last volume of the manga, when Sakura was down, he leaves the scene in order for Chiharu to talk to Sakura. Chiharu adds that he understands that Sakura needs her guidance and counseling, which is why he left so they could talk rather than stay to tell stories.

Yamazaki is also in a relationship with his childhood friend Chiharu, which he speaks openly about in Clear Card during a conversation with Syaoran in the second of two Drama CDs that were released in Japan. Feeling guilty about the fact that he is keeping secret from Sakura her growing powers (which she has not learnt how to control yet) and the fact that he stole the Sakura Cards from her, Syaoran asks Yamazaki awkwardly if there is anything that he couldn't say to Chiharu until now, even though they've known each other since they were little. Yamazaki tells Syaoran that there are things he cannot tell her and things he wants to hide from her, no matter how long they've been dating, but thinks that's unavoidable, adding that not matter how much he loves Chiharu neither of them are the same person, but because they aren't the same person, he can notice things she wouldn't, and she lets Yamazaki notices things too, and he can get help from her with things she can't do and he can help her too in return. This is something that makes Yamazaki happy, and asks Syaoran if it's the same for him. Syaoran says he thinks so too, but it is clear that he still feels guilty about keeping secrets from Sakura.

Yamazaki is named after film director, Takashi Yamazaki, who is a friend of CLAMP. He is known as Zachary Marker in the English adaptation Cardcaptors and his relationship with Chiharu is written so that they are cousins and her acts of strangling are the result of sibling rivalry. Yamazaki also makes an appearance in Clamp's manga series, Tsubasa: Reservoir Chronicle in Piffle Country as an announcer, where he retains his tendency to fabricate elaborate stories.

In the Japanese version, he is voiced by Issei Miyazaki. He is voiced by Philip Pacaud in the English Cardcaptors dub, and by Joshua Seth in the second movie. In the English dub of the Clear Card arc, Takashi is voiced by Alejandro Saab.

=== Chiharu Mihara ===
Chiharu Mihara (三原 千春, Mihara Chiharu) is one of Sakura Kinomoto's friends and classmates in school. Along with Rika Sasaki and Naoko Yanagisawa, Chiharu often appears alongside Sakura at school and during school events. She is also on the school's cheerleading squad with Sakura. Chiharu's most notable trait is her relationship with Takashi Yamazaki, whom she has known since kindergarten. She is never fooled by his rampant storytelling and is usually driven silence him by comically strangling him, which usually does not prevent him from continuing. Despite the rough-handling, she and Yamazaki actually share a close relationship and it is implied that they care for one another in a more affectionate manner. In Chapter 48 of the manga, Chiharu reveals to Sakura that she and Yamazaki are a couple when Sakura turns to her for advice on love and true feelings as Sakura reflects on her own relationship with Syaoran. She and Yamazaki call Sakura over when they notice her looking unwell (due to Sakura's guilt about encouraging Syaoran to ask the girl out that he likes, believing that she made him feel awkward due to the fact that she was that girl and was unaware at the time that Syaoran loves her) and Yamazaki leaves Chiharu and Sakura alone to talk. Chiharu explains to Sakura that Yamazaki thought she should listen to Sakura if Sakura wanted to talk. Sakura is amazed that she knew what Yamazaki thought just because of a look, and its here that Chiharu happily reveals that the two of them have been together a long time. Sakura asks Chiharu what she would do if she said something bad to Yamazaki, and she says she would apologise. Chiharu notes that she's the type to speak her mind and sometimes say bad things, but apologises to Yamazaki when she does so as she really does love him and wants them to stay together. Chiharu explains that she doesn't think through or mean in a bad way a lot of the things she says to Yamazaki, and its then that she apologises when she realises how much she hurt him. Chiharu also knows that Yamazaki will tell her its okay, something which she says to him too when Yamazaki does something bad and apologises. When Yamazaki quickly returns with drinks and startles Sakura, Chiharu thinks about how bad his timing is and shakes and tells Yamazaki off. Yamazaki laughs, and the two happily smile at each other, while Sakura smiles at them both.

Chiharu and Yamazaki's relationship is also referenced a few times in the Clear Card arc. In the second Clear Card CD drama, which takes place before the events of Chapter 31 (when Syaoran reveals to Sakura the truth about him taking the Clear Cards from her), Yamazaki discusses his relationship with Chiharu and his deep love for her with Syaoran.

In the Cardcaptors dub, she is known as Chelsea and Yamazaki is written as her cousin to justify the random acts of strangling as sibling rivalry.

In the Japanese version, she is voiced by Miwa Matsumoto. She is voiced by Jocelyne Loewen in the Cardcaptors dub, and by Dorothy Elias-Fahn in the second movie. In the English dub of the Clear Card arc, she is voiced by Jill Harris.

=== Naoko Yanagisawa ===
Naoko Yanagisawa (柳沢 奈緒子, Yanagisawa Naoko) is one of Sakura Kinomoto's classmates and friends in school and often appears at school events with Sakura's other friends, Chiharu and Rika. Despite being bad at gymnastics, she is also a member of the school's cheerleading squad alongside Sakura.

Naoko loves reading various types of stories, especially fantasy stories and ghost stories. While Sakura reacts to scary situations with utmost fear, Naoko reacts with fascination and a brave willingness to explore these mysterious situations further, oblivious to or willingly ignoring Sakura's fear. In the anime, Naoko's love of stories causes trouble when she finds The Create card in the form of a notebook and writes a fantastic story within it, forcing Sakura to defeat Naoko's creations before recovering The Create. When Naoko wakes up the next morning to find her book suddenly missing, she believes she just had a supernatural experience.

She is known as Nikki in the English adaptation Cardcaptors. She is voiced by Emi Motoi in the Japanese anime, Kelly Sheridan in Cardcaptors, and by Sherry Lynn in the second movie. In the English dub of the Clear Card arc, Naoko is voiced by Dani Chambers.

=== Masaki Amamiya ===
Masaki Amamiya (雨宮 真嬉, Amamiya Masaki) is the great-grandfather of Sakura Kinomoto, Toya Kinomoto and Tomoyo Daidouji on her mother's side. Initially objecting to Nadeshiko's marriage to Fujitaka Kinomoto, he became more accepting upon meeting Sakura and later receiving a gift from her as a form of peace between family members. In the episode, Sakura and the Rainbow of Memories, Sakura doesn't know who he was and they spent a good time together, playing tennis, having tea, Sakura giving him cookies and Masaki giving Sakura the dress her mother wore. Just before leaving, Sakura used the Rain card to make a rainbow for Masaki, prompting him to remember when Nadeshiko had first pointed out a rainbow to him. Sakura discovers the present Masaki left her was the dress she wore at his summer house, although she does not seem to realizes who he actually is despite Cerberus pointing out its origins.

Masaki later appears in Clear Card, inviting Sakura and Syaoran for another visit to his summer house. In the occasion, he presents Sakura with a mysterious key that once belonged to her mother, and later states that he intends is to have Sakura inherit the summer house itself after he passes away.

In the anime series, Masaki is voiced by Osamu Saka. In the English dub, Mr. Avalon was portrayed instead as the father of Natasha Avalon, making him the grandfather of Sakura instead of her great-grandfather. In the English dub of the Clear Card arc, Masaki is voiced by Charlie Campbell.

=== Kaho Mizuki ===
Kaho Mizuki (観月 歌帆, Mizuki Kaho) is a shrine maiden and the daughter of the priest at the Tsukimine Shrine. She first appears in the series as a new substitute teacher at Tomoeda Elementary School for the math class of Sakura Kinomoto and Syaoran Li. While Sakura instantly crushes on the female teacher (brought on by her magical energy) and feels a connection with her, Syaoran is distrustful and believes she is up to no good.

When Sakura, Syaoran, Meiling and Tomoyo are trapped by the Maze card, Kaho uses a mysterious bell to break through Maze's walls allowing Sakura to capture it. After this incident, the readers learn that Sakura's older brother Toya dated Kaho when she was his junior high school teacher and that they broke up when Kaho left to study in England. Before she left, she told them that when they met again, they would be in love with different people which he acknowledges is now true.

After meeting her, Cerberus incorrectly believes that Kaho is the false form of his fellow guardian Yue, which is later shown to actually be Yukito Tsukishiro. Kaho's role is to use the bell left at her family's shrine to give Sakura another chance when she is unable to defeat Yue out of fear of hurting him. The bell changes Sakura's staff into a new staff containing her own power of the stars and gives her the power to use the cards to defeat Yue. After fulfilling this duty, she returns to England. During the third season of the series, she is primarily "seen" through providing a steady, but oftentimes enigmatic exchange of letters with Sakura over the mysterious attacks. After Eriol Hiiragizawa reveals the truth behind the attacks, they learn that Kaho had met Eriol three years before Sakura discovered the Book of the Clow. As they leave for England, Kaho and Eriol confirm their feelings for one another and vow to remain together. She is later seen beside Eriol on a few occasions in both the second movie and the Clear Card arc.

In the anime series, Kaho is voiced by Emi Shinohara. In the English adaptation Cardcaptors, her name is changed to Layla MacKenzie and she is voiced by Linda Rae Jurgens. She is voiced by Philece Sampler in the English adaptation of the second movie. In the English dub of the Clear Card arc, Kaho is voiced by Morgan Garrett.

=== Eriol Hiragizawa ===
Eriol Hiragizawa (柊沢 エリオル, Hīragizawa Erioru) is the main antagonist in the second half of the series, commonly called the Master of the Clow arc. The reincarnation of Clow Reed, Eriol has both Clow's memories and all of his magic power. He has a magical staff similar to Clow Reed's, can restrain Clow's creations Yue and Cerberus, and has created his own similar pair of guardians: Ruby Moon and Spinel Sun. He moves from England to transfer to Tomoeda Elementary school after Sakura Kinomoto passed the Last Judgement and became the official master of the cards. He is depicted as a quiet, mature boy while at school, though he also shows a mischievous side when he regularly joins classmate Takashi Yamazaki in weaving complex lies about the history of objects, places, and events. While seeming a normal student to Sakura, Syaoran Li is suspicious of him, mainly due to that Eriol is overly nice to Sakura which makes Syaoran jealous. It is soon shown that Yue and Cerberus are able to detect his magical signature as being Clow's, and Eriol must erase Yue's memories of encountering him after he is accidentally seen by him.

Eriol came to Japan in order to aid Sakura and force her to use her own magical powers to convert the Clow Cards into Sakura cards. This is necessary as the cards take their magical energy from their master, but until Sakura converted them, they could not use her magic and were slowly dying. The guardian Yue also was suffering the same fate, forcing Sakura's brother to "feed" him all of his magical power to prevent Yue, and his false form Yukito, from dying.

Sakura does not become aware that Eriol is causing all of the magical disasters that are forcing her to convert the cards until near the end of the series when Eriol reveals himself to her. He puts the city to sleep and challenges Sakura to convert the last two cards, the Dark and the Light, which must be changed together. After Sakura successfully does so, he then tells her that she is now more powerful than Clow Reed and asks her to perform one final task for him: to divide his own magical power between himself and her father Fujitaka—the other reincarnation of Clow Reed—so that Eriol will no longer be the most powerful magician in the world. He then takes Sakura, Syaoran, Tomoyo, Yue, and Cerberus to his home where he explains why he had to give her a reason to convert the cards, as her doing so without a need could have been dangerous for Sakura.

Eriol's true age is unknown, as he used his magic to halt his aging process to remain the same physical age as Sakura. He is romantically involved with Kaho Mizuki, whom he originally sent from England to aid Sakura in the Final Judgment and who offers Sakura support through letters during the second arc. At the end of the manga series, she returns with him to England, and in the second anime movie, they are shown together when Sakura calls for advice, though their love is never confessed like in the manga, only hinted at indirectly. In the Clear Card arc. Eriol ceases all contact with Sakura after the Sakura cards turn blank, but keeps in touch with Syaoran who informs him about everything that happens around her. While questioned about his reasons, Eriol claims that he is waiting for the right time to interfere, and thus forbids both Syaoran and his companions in England from taking action until then.

In the anime series, Eriol is the sole reincarnation of Clow Reed, with all of the elements from the manga regarding Fujitaka's relation to Clow and inheriting of half of his powers removed. The final explanation at Eriol's house is also shifted slightly so it takes place the day after the final battle, rather than immediately after, and it is done because Sakura seeks him out rather than him giving an invitation.

The character of Eriol is voiced by Nozomu Sasaki. In the Cardcaptors English adaptation, his name is changed to Eli Moon and he is voiced by Bill Switzer. In the English dub of the second film, his voice is supplied by Johnny Yong Bosch. In the English dub of the Clear Card arc, Eriol is voiced by Micah Solusod.

=== Spinel Sun ===
Spinel Sun (スピネル・サン, Supineru San) is the cat-like magical guardian created by Eriol Hiiragizawa. The counterpart to Clow Reed's original guardian Cerberus. Spinel Sun's true form is a butterfly-winged black panther with cat-like ears and ruffs of fur on the side of his head, while his false form is similar to a small winged cat with the same wing type as his true form. Nicknamed Suppi by Ruby Moon, Spinel Sun spends most of his time reading and projects a calm demeanor. Ruby Moon often teases him that he needs to have more fun. During the series, he mostly remains out of sight of the main characters, except when he once runs into Cerberus in his false form (though this encounter is exclusive to the anime). Fortunately for him, Cerberus doesn't suspect anything and instead declares Spinel Sun a monster and feeds him, sweets, not realizing that the sweets would turn him into a hyperactive eating machine. Cerberus does not learn his true identity until just before the final battle when the two cats face one another. Initially, Spinel Sun appears to have the upper hand, however, Cerberus' greater determination to protect Sakura enables him to defeat him.

In the anime adaptation, he is voiced by Katsuyuki Konishi in his true form, and by Yumi Tōma in his false form. In the second Cardcaptor Sakura movie, his false form briefly appears and is voiced by Philece Sampler. In the English adaptation Cardcaptors, his name is changed to Spinner Sun and both forms are voiced by Colin Murdock. In the Clear Card arc, Spinel's false form is voiced by Apphia Yu.

=== Nakuru Akizuki / Ruby Moon ===
Ruby Moon (ルビー・ムーン, Rubī Mūn) is one of two magical guardians created by Eriol Hiiragizawa. The counterpart to Clow Reed's original guardian Yue. When Eriol transfers from England to Tomoeda Elementary, Japan, Ruby Moon created a false form named Nakuru Akizuki (秋月 奈久留, Akizuki Nakuru) and enrolls in Seijou High School out of sheer boredom, entering the same class as Toya Kinomoto, Sakura's brother, and Yukito Tsukishiro, the false form of Yue who is unaware of his true nature. Ruby Moon has a friendly brother/sister relationship with Eriol's other guardian, Spinel Sun; she teases him constantly and gives him a nickname "Suppi-chan", and is granted free-rein by Eriol to do as she pleases, which contrasts with Spinel's serious demeanor and reluctance to leave his master's side.

Her true form resembles a human-sized fairy dressed long dark red and black gown, with black and pink butterfly wings that performs ruby-based attacks. As with Yue, Ruby Moon also takes her energy from the Moon, and both are rivals in power and ability. Ruby Moon is sexless / non-binary and has no biological sex, but prefers feminine pronouns; her "human sex" is unspecified, not being of either gender and having no figure like Yukito/Yue, being referred to as "she" throughout the series. Akizuki describes herself as genderless and has stated a preference for women's clothing and enjoys "being cute".

Unlike the Yue/Yukito relationship, both Ruby/Nakuru forms are fully aware and display no dissociative personality; they share memories and thoughts as one being. Nakuru's family name, Akizuki, means "autumn moon". Ruby Moon uses the false form to conserve Eriol's magical energy and to hide her aura. As the alias, Nakuru Akizuki, she acts as cheerful, out-going, hyper-active, general annoyance. She is athletic, having beaten the entire boys basketball team in a game for fun. Her many female friends in Seijou High admire her for her abilities. She deliberately interferes whenever Toya tries to talk to Yukito about the latter's dwindling energy. She claims a desire to consume Toya's energy herself, though it is never stated that she actually has a need for it nor why she couldn't simply steal it. When Toya is finally able to speak with Yue and give him all of his magical energy to sustain Yue's life, Akizuki gives up her pursuit. In the final battle, Ruby Moon battles Yue and initially appears to be winning. However, Yue is able to get past her due to Yue's greater determination and desire to protect Sakura.

In Clear Card, Ruby/Nakuru and Spinel return to Japan under Eriol's instructions to share their magic with Yue and Yukito to help them.

In the anime adaptation, Ruby Moon is voiced by Ryōka Yuzuki. In the English adaptation, Cardcaptors, both her true form and false form are called Ruby Moon and she is voiced by Willow Johnson. In the Clear Card arc, she is voiced by Alexis Tipton.

=== Ms. Morita ===
Ms. Morita is Sakura's middle school teacher. She is voiced by Yuri Yokoyama in Japanese and Caitlin Glass in English.

=== Akiho Shinomoto ===
Akiho Shinomoto (詩之本 秋穂, Shinomoto Akiho) first appears in Cardcaptor Sakura: Clear Card. She is a young girl who bears a strong resemblance to Sakura, being around the same age and height. Akiho is rarely seen without her stuffed rabbit Momo, which she has owned since she was a small child.

Akiho makes her first appearance in chapter 7 of the Clear Card arc as a transfer student in Sakura and Tomoyo's class. Akiho used to live in France, Germany, Italy, England, and Hong Kong before moving to Japan, and is initially shy around her classmates due to her nervousness about speaking Japanese. Akiho is gifted at singing and, with Tomoyo and Sakura's encouragement, joins the school choir club.

Akiho lives with her caretaker Yuna D. Kaito in Eriol's old house. She tells Sakura that Yuna has cared for her since she was very young, and suggests that she is distant from her blood relatives. Many of Akiho's relatives are avid book collectors who travel the world in search of rare books. Akiho's family installed its massive library of books in her house, among them one of her most prized possessions, a novel titled "Alice in Clockland" written in a foreign script only she can read. Akiho states that she has moved from country to country for most of her life in search of a particular book.

Later is revealed that Akiho is part of the "D" magician clan, but despite having born from the two most powerful magicians of the clan at the time, she has no magic power at all, thus the clan decides to use her to create the ultimate magic tool by implanting many spells in her body, despite knowing that it would destroy her soul, until Kaito takes her with him.

In the anime adaptation, Akiho Shinomoto is voiced by Minori Suzuki in Japanese and AmaLee in English.

=== Yuna D. Kaito ===
Yuna D. Kaito (ユナ·D·海渡, Yuna Dī Kaito) first appears in Cardcaptor Sakura: Clear Card as the main antagonist in the entire manga series. He has served as Akiho Shinomoto's legal guardian and caretaker since she was young. Yuna is a tall, dark-haired young man who appears dressed in full formal uniform, including an unusual pocket watch which he holds dear. He is professional and polite in his interactions with others, and is skilled at various domestic tasks including baking and sewing.

Syaoran senses that Yuna possesses strong moon magic, and Eriol confirms that the "D." in Yuna's name is a title from a notorious English wizarding society. Yuna appears to be aware of both the existence of the Clear Cards and the fact that Sakura is a magician. Thus-far, it has been hinted that he's after the Clear Cards as a means of powering a certain spell, possibly connected to a magical object, a magical time-controlling pocket watch (mentioned above), which he had stolen from the society of sorcerers he was formerly a part of, and that he's using both Sakura and Akiho to get them (having some-how created a connection between then before they had even met, which is evident by them sharing the same reoccurring dreams but are completely oblivious that they have been seeing one another), but that the ones that Sakura has created so far are not yet enough for his purpose to activate the Alice in Clockland relic he stole from the magic association from which he was excommunicated.

Although this is not stated in the actual story, it was revealed by CLAMP during a podcast in December 2024 that Kaito's magic (like Eriol's) makes him appear different to his actual, unknown age.

In the anime adaptation, Yuna D. Kaito is voiced by Natsuki Hanae and Brandon McInnis in English.

=== Momo ===
Momo (モモ) first appears in Cardcaptor Sakura: Clear Card, the time-themed magical guardian of a relic known as Alice in Clockland which Kaito stole and gave to Akiho for his plans. While her true form is humanoid like Yue and Ruby Moon, Momo takes after Kero and Spinel Sun in her borrowed form being a rabbit-like plushie. Momo concealed her existence for most of the storyline with Kaito the only one she speaks to, the two both needing to watch over Akiho.

In the anime adaptation, Momo is voiced by Minako Kotobuki and Jad Saxton in English.

== Recurring characters in the anime ==
These characters only appears in the animated films and television series adaptations. These are character that appears only in the anime adaptation of Cardcaptor Sakura.

=== Wang Wei ===
Wang Wei (偉望, Wěi Wàng) is a character that appears only in the Cardcaptor Sakura anime adaptation. Wang is employed as a butler in the Li household, and currently acts as legal guardian to Syaoran and Meiling Li during their extended stay in Tomoeda, Japan. Wei is very polite and well-mannered, referring to Syaoran and Meiling as "Syaoran-sama" and "Meiling-sama", and has good manners when in the company of others like Sakura Kinomoto and Tomoyo Daidōji who becomes good friends with Wang and his quarry.

In the anime series, Wang is voiced by Motomu Kiyokawa, Ron Halder in the Cardcaptors dub, Darren Pleavin in the Animax dub, and Francis Henry in the English dub of Clear Card.

=== Maki Matsumoto ===
Maki Matsumoto (松本 真樹, Matsumoto Maki) is a character that appears only in the Cardcaptor Sakura anime adaptation. She first appears in the fifth episode, opening a new gift shop in Tomoeda called Twin Bells following her husband's recent demise and a string of misfortunes. Sakura sees her setting up shop and helps her clean up after some boxes fall over. After the shop opens, Maki has trouble a mysterious stuffed animal that keeps returning to her shop every time someone buys it, resulting in accusations that Maki is stealing it back. Sakura discovers that the stuffed animal is The Jump card and seals it. Maki later introduces a line of "enchanted cards", which resemble Clow Cards, that grant their owners good luck in certain areas, (i.e. cooking, sports etc.). The Shot is among the cards in the rack, eventually being purchased by Meiling who accidentally causes it to attack Syaoran. Sakura and her classmates shop at Twin Bells regularly. Maki appears throughout the first season of the series and in both films.

In the anime series, Maki is voiced by Kotono Mitsuishi. In the English dub Cardcaptors, her name is changed to Maggie and voiced by Nicole Oliver. In the Animax dub she was voiced by Candice Moore.

=== Syaoran Li's family ===
Syaoran Li's family first appear in Cardcaptor Sakura: The Movie. His mother, Yelan Li (李 夜蘭, Lǐ Yèlán)", is an extremely serious and strict person; deeply respected by her children, especially Syaoran. However, she demonstrates kindness and sympathetic, as seen when she helped Sakura Kinomoto to discover that an evil entity was the true reason behind her visit to Hong Kong. Syaoran's sisters are mentioned in Clear Card but don't appear in the manga, but Yelan makes various appearances in both the manga series and in a one-shot story released only in Japan with a special edition of Clear Card Volume 10 that focuses on the long-distance relationship that Sakura and Syaoran maintained when he was back in Hong Kong.

== Film characters ==
=== Madoushi ===
Madoushi (魔導師, Madōshi, literally Sorceress), the spirit of a woman who had fought bitterly with Clow Reed about the appropriate use of magic, is introduced in Cardcaptor Sakura: The Movie (she was renamed Su Yung in the English Cardcaptors dub of the film) as a minor antagonist. She resembles a young, 20/30-something woman, dressed in an old-fashioned Ruqun Hanfu. Even after her death, she attempted to continue the feud by embedding her spirit in a book and waiting for Clow Reed. After Sakura accidentally releases her, the sorceress refuses to believe Clow Reed is dead and attacks Sakura and her friends for trying to trick her. When Sakura is able to convince her that Clow Reed has gone, the spirit realizes that she had truly loved Clow Reed rather than hating him as she believed, and peacefully passes on.
