= Sakura Kinomoto =

Fictional character from Cardcaptor Sakura

- Cardcaptor Sakura character
- Sakura in her elementary school uniform, illustration by Clamp
- First appearance: Chapter 1 (manga)
- Created by: Clamp
- Voiced by: Japanese; Sakura Tange; English; Carly McKillip (Nelvana dub); Andrea Kwan (Animax dub); Kari Wahlgren (2nd film); Monica Rial (Clear Card arc)

In-universe information
- Aliases: Cardcaptor Sakura; Sakura Avalon
- Weapon: Wand; Cards; Book
- Family: Fujitaka Kinomoto (father); Nadeshiko Kinomoto (late mother); Toya Kinomoto (older brother); Tomoyo Daidouji (maternal second cousin; best friend); Sonomi Daidouji (maternal cousin once removed); Masaki Amamiya (maternal great-grandfather)
- Significant other: Syaoran Li (boyfriend)

Sakura Kinomoto (Japanese: 木之本 桜, Hepburn: Kinomoto Sakura) is the main protagonist and title character of Clamp's manga series Cardcaptor Sakura. In the English anime adaptation by Nelvana of the series, Cardcaptors, she is known as Sakura Avalon, though her surname was changed back in the second film's dub by Bang Zoom! Entertainment.

A student in the town of Tomoeda, Japan, Sakura Kinomoto was originally nine years old when she began her journey as the Cardcaptor, an unintentional student of the mystical deceased magus Clow. Breaking the seal on his spellbook, she released several powerful spirits from their prison in the form of tarot cards, which then went out to cause chaos and havoc in her hometown. Working alongside the two familiars of the book, Cerberus and Yue, Sakura set out to capture each of the cards and restore their seals, gaining their abilities for her own use in the process. It took four years, but Sakura succeeded in capturing, and sealing, each of the Clow Cards, as well as transforming them into her own creation, Sakura Cards, further increasing her abilities with them.

For all Japanese-language productions of the anime (including films, audio CDs, and video games), Sakura is voiced by Sakura Tange. For the Nelvana English-language dub production, she is voiced by Carly McKillip through Cardcaptors and the first film. In the Animax English-language dub production, which is much closer to the Japanese original than the Nelvana version (in terms of scenes cut), she is voiced by Andrea Kwan. She is voiced in the second film by Kari Wahlgren. For the English-language dub of the Clear Card series, she is voiced by Monica Rial, who also does the voice of her counterpart in Tsubasa Reservoir Chronicle.

== Creation and conception ==
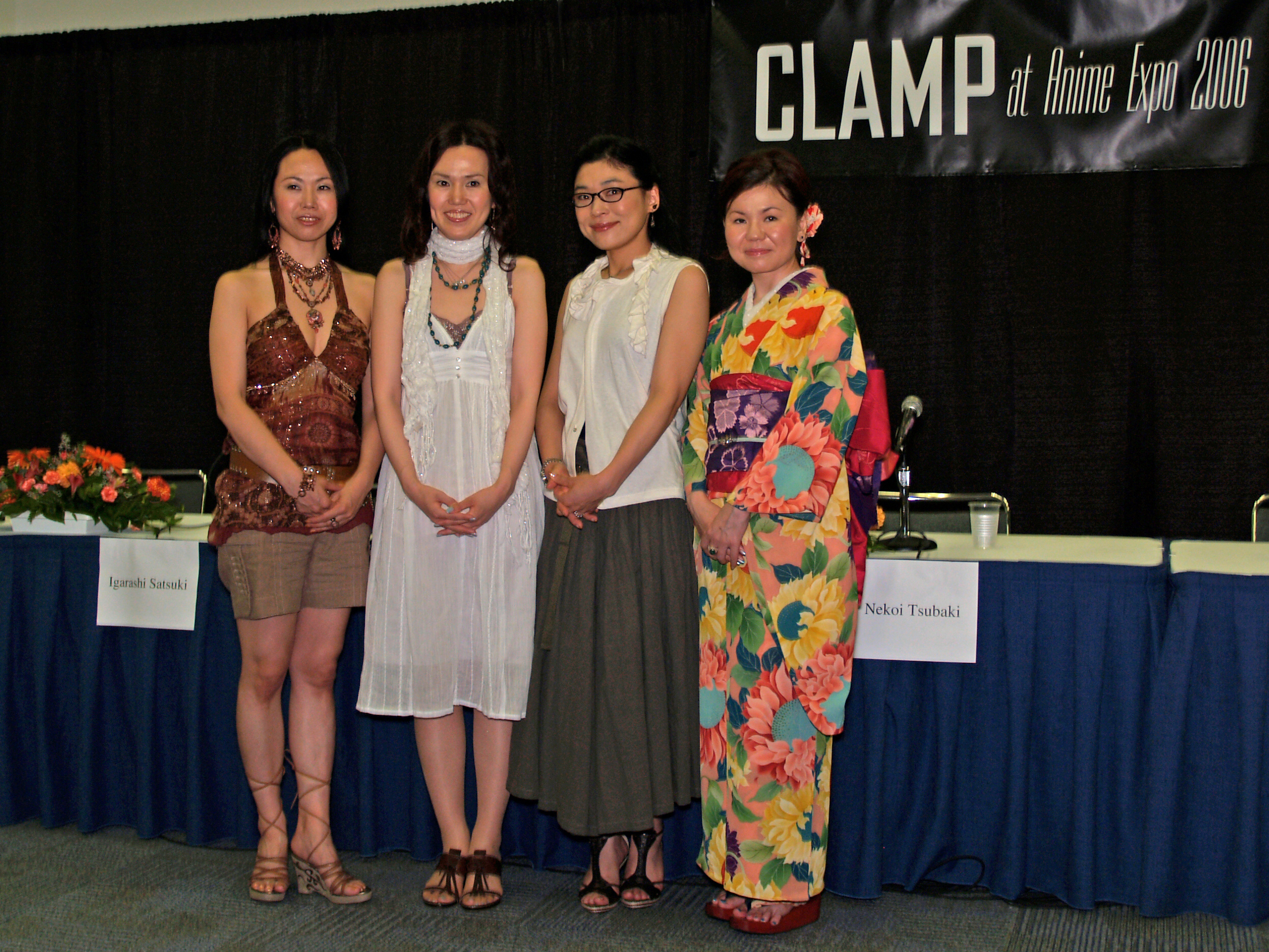
The four Clamp artists (from left to right): Satsuki Igarashi, Nanase Ohkawa, Mick Nekoi, and Mokona Apapa created Sakura

Clamp writer Nanase Ohkawa's first impulse was to create a magical girl series, despite not being well-versed in the genre. Ohkawa wanted the heroine Sakura to be in the same age group as the majority of Nakayoshi's readers so that fans could relate to her. While Ohkawa planned out Cardcaptor Sakura from beginning to end, she never consulted the plot with the other members, instead giving them the script one chapter at a time. Mokona initially drew Tomoyo so it would look like she was in love with Toya, which led to her surprise when she received the script for the chapter which reveals Tomoyo loves Sakura. The story was planned to have the theme of "if you try your best, it'll work out", but Ohkawa did not start out with Sakura's "It'll definitely be okay" mindset. Ohkawa wanted to write a story that "minorities would feel comfortable with." The series' main theme is expressed through Sakura, a main character designed to be open-minded about different family structures and kinds of love. Ohkawa addressed the relationships featured in the series by using Tomoyo and Sakura as an example. She explained that the reason Tomoyo and Sakura did not end up together was not because Tomoyo is a girl, but rather because Sakura did not love Tomoyo in a romantic way.

Sakura's character design for the manga was originally developed by Mokona of Clamp. She was designed to capture the image of Mokona's then two-year-old niece Kawaji. The original character's facial expression changed considerably until the manga started. Her many magical costumes were introduced as CLAMP felt it was "sad" for a girl to wear the same magical costume all the time influenced by the manga series Sailor Moon. Between the manga and the anime adaptation, nearly 300 costumes were made with most of them being created specifically for Sakura. As the series' main theme is "love", Clamp focused on the multiple relationships Sakura has. Both Syaoran Li and Tomoyo Daidoji were found as popular characters for often comforting the main character based on how the readers related themselves with their feelings for Sakura.

Picking a Japanese actress to voice Sakura was difficult. Neither Ohkawa nor anime director Morio Asaka was satisfied with any of the voice actresses who auditioned for the role. In the end, Sakura Tange was selected for the role, with sound director Masafumi Mima believing her to fit the character thanks to her quiet and strong voice.

There are fictional magical cards used in the manga and anime series Cardcaptor Sakura. They serve as magical items for the protagonist to use for various means. The deck consists of nineteen cards in the manga and fifty-three in the anime. The popularity and success of Cardcaptor Sakura led to the creation of several toys of the Clow Cards, including a set of toy cards released by the Nakayoshi magazine to celebrate its sixtieth anniversary.

In Nelvana's English adaptation titled "Cardcaptors", Sakura was originally going to be called Nikki, but they later decided to keep her first original given name because of the reception of the Cardcaptors adaptation plus the difficulty and expense of editing out numerous appearances of her name in rōmaji in the anime series. However, her family name was changed to "Avalon".

== Characterization ==
Sakura is portrayed as a young girl with magical powers she inherited from Clow Reed. Her first power is the oneiromancy and precognition ability to see the future through her dreams which serves as an ideal protection for the protagonist. In some of her dreams, Sakura sees the boy she has a crush on, Yukito Tsukishiro, and often interacts with him as her brother, Toya, is a classmate of him. Despite not knowing her late mother due to being too young when she died, Sakura still cares for her based on what her father, Fujitaka, used to tell her. Sakura is unaware Toya also possesses magic powers but she keeps it a secret though Toya is clearly able to tell when her sister is making magic. Sakura goes through a character arc when Toya is hurt by the spirit of the magic card Mirror. As a result, Sakura goes from a passive to a more active characterization in regard to her journey of finding all Clow Cards.

=== Relationships ===
In contrast to the distant Syaoran Li, who keeps off his distance from people related to magic, Sakura becomes attached to her math teacher Kaho Mizuki. Although Sakura cares about her journey, she is oblivious to what type of disaster the Clow Cards might cause. Through her talks with Kerberos, Sakura becomes afraid that such a disaster would be her loss of memories. Sakura is also unaware that Syaoran develops feelings for her rather but they become close when he aids her whenever she becomes concerned about how to solve her issues. Sakura herself also develops romantic feelings towards Syaoran but her naivety makes her not understand her own feelings. However, the evolution of Sakura's magic and the improvement of her staff solves as a symbol of Sakura's growth. Another major impact in her journey is how Sakura gains allies, most notably Yue, the true form of Clow's servant who had developed a human form, Yukito. Although Yue is devoted to Clow Reed, Sakura's kind heart causes him to choose her as his second master.

In the last chapters of the series, Sakura confesses her feelings towards Yukito. As Yukito was always aware of the young girl's feelings, he tries to help her, but this gives her depression. However, Syaoran comforts Sakura in regard to her feelings, which she does not understand. Eriol, the reincarnation of Clow Reed, tests Sakura both in terms of magic and emotions. During the climax, Eriol performs his test by attacking Syaoran which causes a more aggressive feeling in Sakura not seen before. This helps Sakura to realize that Syaoran is important in her life (in contrast to their initial bad relationship) and is the person she loves the most. The decision to have Sakura and Syaoran become a couple was popular amongst fans, with Nanase Ohkawa noting this in a February 2001 interview; saying that she was glad that the readers were happy that Sakura and Syaoran got together. However, Ohkawa dismissed potential concerns that this ending was chosen for heteronormative reasons, outright stating that Sakura loves him as a person in the first place and would still have fallen in love with him under different circumstances like greater difference in age or even the same gender. In the same interview she said that Sakura loves Tomoyo but not the same way she feels about Syaoran.

Sakura's relationship with Syaoran highly stands out among other love interests in Clamp's works because the manga is aimed towards a younger demographic in contrast to darker stories. Writer Kiyoshi Saiga comments that the focus on multiple types of relationships is Clamp's signature style of writing and Cardcaptor Sakura heavily focuses on these ideas rather than the search for magic cards. The handling of unconditional love is portrayed early through Tomoyo, who is in love with Sakura, but, as she can tell, Sakura does not share such feelings. Her dream is that Sakura meets the person she loves and thus can achieve happiness. Saiga further comments that Sakura is an audience surrogate as across the narrative, both the reader and Sakura mature and explore the concept what is the love they seek. Still, Sakura also stands out within magical girls as, rather than changing like other superheroes, Sakura's optimistic feelings remain the same in the manga.

In November 2016, Ohkawa added that Sakura is someone who believes that "those around her will be there to catch her."

During a CLAMP Twitter Space discussion in April 2024, Nanase Ohkawa indirectly revealed that Sakura will one day marry Syaoran, but expressed doubts at the time about their wedding ever being shown, expressing the view that "it'd be best for everyone to imagine Sakura and Syaoran's wedding in their own hearts", but did not rule out the story of Cardcaptor Sakura continuing at some point after the publication of the final volume of Cardcaptor Sakura: Clear Card.

=== Abilities ===
The Clow Book is a book containing a collection of mysterious and powerful magic cards titled "Clow Cards", originally owned by Clow Reed. It eventually becomes the Sakura Book. Sakura's main weapon, The Sealing Staff, grants her access to all of her abilities. It is capable of sealing ghostly spirits into special magic cards, which she can use again at will. The Staff also serves as a conduit for her abilities, changing shape as necessary depending on the skill. When not in use, the staff is a small pendant she wears around her neck. Despite her variety and massive strengths, Sakura still has limited control over the Sakura/Clear Cards, and cannot use them to their fullest extent; using the stronger cards can exhaust her quickly, and are often too dangerous for her to control safely. In addition, without her cards, or even her staff, Sakura lacks physical or magical abilities, not even having basic self-defense techniques.

==== The Cards ====
Sakura has a differing amount of usable cards depending on the source material: 19 in the original manga and 53 in the expanded anime and film series. However, all of the cards fit in some way under the Six Major Cards, which grant Sakura their respective abilities. In the second film, three special cards also exist; The Nothing (Strong as all other cards combined), The Nameless Card (A personification of romantic love), and The Hope (Complete counter to The Nothing).

The Clear Cards are new cards that started to appear after the Sakura Cards had turned blank and clear. It was revealed, in Chapter 23, that new cards were created by Sakura herself without realizing it, due to the growth of her magical powers. Unlike either the Clow Cards or Sakura Cards, they do not begin with "The" before the name of the card. In addition, the Clear Cards have two kanji in their Chinese/Japanese name, as opposed to one in the Clow Cards and Sakura Cards (with the exception of The Hope, which also has two kanji).

- The Fiery: Grants Sakura the ability to use pyromancy, as well as giving her abilities tied to physical power. Cards under the Fiery are: The Arrow (Enables archery mastery and conjures a bow), The Fight (Martial arts expertise), The Power (Physical strength increase), The Shot (Self-aiming projectile attack, endless until commanded otherwise), The Sword (blade mastery and conjures a fencing sword), The Through (Passage through otherwise solid objects), The Thunder (Control over lightning), and The Twin (Duplicate any target).
- The Watery: Grants Sakura the ability to use water to slow and assault her enemies, as well as some control over weather phenomena. Cards under the Watery are: The Wave (Weaker version of Watery), The Rain (Creates rain), The Bubbles (Creates soap bubbles), The Cloud (Creates clouds in the sky), The Mist (Covering fog and acidic mist), The Freeze (Cryomancy), The Snow (Creates snowfall), The Wood (Control of trees, vines, and branches, spontaneous growth).
- The Earthy: Grants Sakura the ability to manipulate stone and earth as she desires. Cards under the Earthy are: The Flower (Creates any flower or blossom in an infinite amount), The Libra (Truth-telling spirit), The Lock (Seal any door, room, or area, psychokinetic defense), The Loop (Bend time/space to create an infinite loop), The Maze (Generate a maze that must be navigated to escape, can be destroyed), The Mirror (Copy and become reflected individuals, reflect abilities), The Sand (Manipulate sand), The Shield (Near-perfect defense against any attack or ability, can be circumvented/broken).
- The Windy: Grants Sakura the ability to control wind currents and create bindings. Cards under The Windy are: The Dash (Supernatural speed), The Float (Ability to hover/float in midair), The Fly (Indefinite flight), The Jump (Enhanced jumping abilities), The Move (Teleportation of small objects), The Song (Copies and can sing any song), The Storm (Summon rainstorms and tornadoes), The Voice (Steal voices).
- The Light: Grants Sakura the ability to control light and force the sun to rise. One of the strongest cards in the deck (Its counterpart being The Dark). Cards under the Light are: The Big (Massive size increase), The Create (Conjures a book that can write anything into existence), The Glow (Create glowing orbs), The Little (Shrink something, reduce magical abilities), The Return (Travel into the past, cannot interact with the past), The Shadow (Control shadows), The Sweet (Turn objects into candy/sweets).
- The Dark: Grants Sakura the ability to control darkness, as well as nullify opponents' magic. One of the strongest cards in the deck (Its counterpart being The Light). Cards under the Dark are: The Change (Swap bodies/minds once per day), the Dream (Create dreams/prophecies), The Erase (Remove something from existence), The Illusion (Create an illusion from any perspective), The Silent (Stifle all sound, limited kinetic control over noise-generating sources), The Sleep (Put anyone, or a group, of people to sleep), The Time (Freely control the passage of time).

== Appearances ==
=== In Cardcaptor Sakura ===
Sakura Kinomoto is introduced as a nine-year-old girl who lives in the town of Tomoeda in Japan, where she attends Tomoeda Elementary School. During the Clow Card Arc and Sakura Card Arc storylines, she canonically ages to be twelve years at the series end, in both the anime and manga versions. Sakura has short, honey-blonde hair, fair skin, and emerald green eyes. As a descendant of the sorcerer Clow Reed, Sakura inherited magical powers and spends the series searching for the Clow Cards (クロウカード, Kurō Kādo) she accidentally lost. Yukito is Sakura's first crush. He is seven years older than her, but it never bothers her. Due to him being her brother's best friend, she tries to get him to come over to her house and commutes to school with her brother to see Yukito every morning. Although heartbroken, she learns to accept that he loves her brother and maintains a deep friendship with Yukito. One of Sakura's most notable traits is her "invincible spell", "Everything will be alright" (絶対大丈夫だよ, "Zettai daijōbu dayo"), which has carried her through innumerable trials and obstacles as she masters her magical skills.

Sakura's outfits number in the hundreds, which change frequently throughout the series. Unlike other anime magical girls, whose costumes seemingly form out of magical energy, Sakura's battle outfits are hand-sewn by her best friend and cousin Tomoyo. Her most commonly worn iconic everyday outfit is her school uniform, which doubles as her battle uniform. It changes depending on the season. Her winter school uniform is a black long-sleeved shirt with red and white sleeve cuffs, a white neckerchief with a red stripe, and a white pleated miniskirt with a frilly white knee-length petticoat. On particularly cold days, she wears a thick black coat with her school insignia on the back. Her summer uniform is a white half-sleeved shirt with a red neckerchief and a black pleated miniskirt. All year round, black Mary Jane shoes are worn along with white socks and a white sailor hat with a black trim. Her common outfit at home has two double transparent red sometimes green (episode 26 original series) beaded scrunchie to keep her hair on the sides popping out.

After the Final Judgement, a vision of the spirit of Clow Reed tells her that her magic is not drawn from the sun nor from the moon, but from her own star, which may start small, but is ever-shining with its own brilliant light. However, like Clow Reed's magic, Sakura's is a balance of sun and moon magic. Eriol gave half of his powers to Sakura's father, the other half of Clow's incarnation. This made Sakura the most powerful magician in the world, even surpassing her predecessor Clow Reed.

=== In Cardcaptor Sakura: Clear Card ===
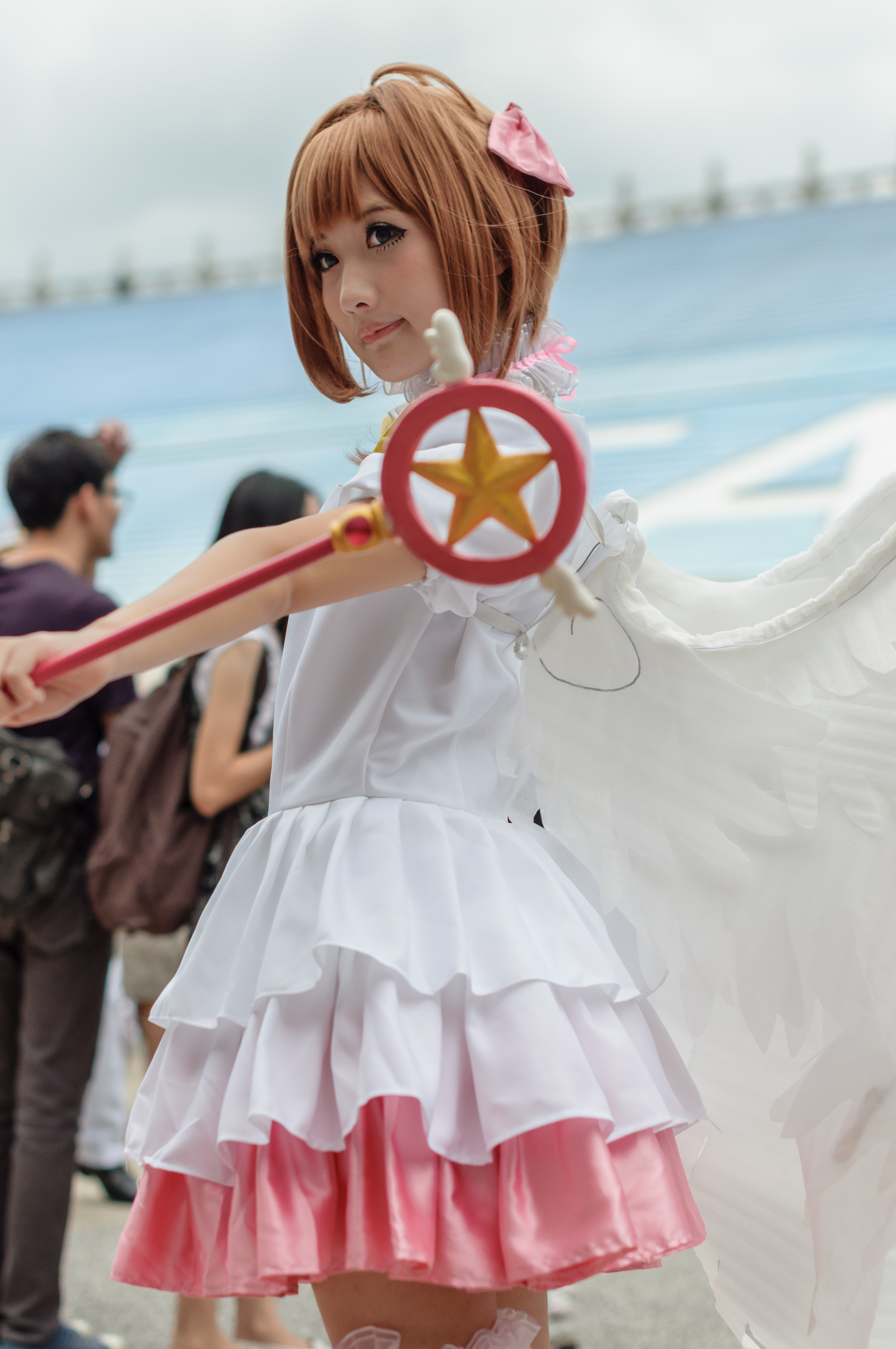
A Sakura Kinomoto cosplayer

In the Clear Card arc, her innate magical powers have developed further and increased drastically to the point that she can effectively create entirely new cards subconsciously which embody her various magic. It is a means as to "not being able to control her powers", according to Eriol. As such, she has the very powerful and rare ability to freely see into the past, even with the "Record" card or without her knowledge.

=== Appearances in other media ===
In Cardcaptor Sakura: The Movie, Sakura wins a trip to Hong Kong, where she meets Syaoran's family and encounters the spirit of a woman angry at Clow Reed who mistakenly calls Sakura to her because of her being the holder of the Clow Cards. In Cardcaptor Sakura Movie 2: The Sealed Card, she learns that there is a fifty-third Clow Card, The Nothing, which acts as a balance to the positive magic of the others.

Sakura is a playable character in eight of the Cardcaptor Sakura video games, and her character design is featured in the series' version of Tetris. The character design of Sakura Kinomoto is reused in the Clamp series Tsubasa: Reservoir Chronicle, which presents an alternate world story that also uses characters from many of the group's previous series. In Tsubasa the design is used for several characters named Sakura, including the central character named Princess Sakura (Sakura-hime). Sakura also plays an important role during the last arc of Tsubasa: Reservoir Chronicle, in a dream of Clone Sakura's; who is now married to Clone Syaoran (one of Syaoan's counterparts in Tsubasa: Reservoir Chronicle), by this time. During this vision, Sakura gives her alternate self the Star Wand and assures her that "everything will be all right." A replica of the wand is later seen in Yuuko Ichihara's shop.

Sakura also appeared in the OVA Tsubasa Tokyo Revelations as a spirit or vision that Princess Sakura sees, which guides her back to where she came from, the Tocho (government building) when she gets lost. She disappears when Princess Sakura sees the building.

In the short anime film Shiritsu Horitsuba Gakuen Bangai-hen: Tenkōsei ni Dokkidoki Sakura appears as a student from the anime's titular school and the younger cousin from Tsubasa's Sakura.

== Reception ==
In both 1999 and 2000, Sakura won the Animage Grand Prix for "Best Female Character". In 2001 Sakura Kinomoto won the "Cutest Anime Girl of the Year" award from All Anime World. In a Newtype poll from August 2001, Sakura was voted as the fourth most popular female anime character, and in a March 2010 poll, she was voted as the fourth "Most Popular Female Anime Character" from the 1990s. She also won the Anime Saimoe Tournament 2002, an online popularity contest for the "Most Moe Anime Character of the Year".

On April 1, 2016, as part of her 20th anniversary, eight "Card Captor Sakura"-themed × Animate Cafe national stores opened.

The Mori Art Center Gallery, located in Tokyo, Japan, featured a Cardcaptor Sakura Exhibition -The Enchanted Art Museum- gallery dedicated to Sakura and her story. The exhibition, which opened in October 2018, is the single largest gathering of Cardcaptor Sakura art ever amassed. The exhibition has an entire section set up as "Tomoyo's Sewing Room", with a number of real-world replicas of Sakura's fashions. Concurrent with the exhibition is the adjacent Sakura Cafe & Parlor, a Cardcaptor Sakura restaurant and gift shop.

Clamp's editor Editor Kiichiro Sugawara commented that when Tsubasa: Reservoir Chronicle started, most of his colleagues kept mentioning the series was interesting for having an alternate version of Sakura Kinomoto as he found that the original Syaoran Li was not popular within Cardcaptor Sakura. As a result, Sugawara wanted Syaoran to also become popular among readers of the series.
