= Cardcaptor Sakura Movie 2: The Sealed Card =

2000 film by Morio Asaka

- DVD cover
- Japanese: 劇場版カードキャプターさくら封印されたカード
- Literal meaning: Cardcaptor Sakura the Movie: The Sealed Card
- Revised Hepburn: Gekijō-ban Kādokyaputā Sakura Fūin Sareta Kādo
- Directed by: Morio Asaka
- Screenplay by: Nanase Ohkawa
- Based on: Cardcaptor Sakura by Clamp
- Produced by: Kazuhiko Ikeguchi; Kouichi Tsurunari; Shinji Komori; Tatsuya Ono; Tsuyoshi Yoshida
- Starring: Sakura Tange; Aya Hisakawa; Masaya Onosaka; Motoko Kumai; Junko Iwao; Tomokazu Seki; Megumi Ogata; Yukana Nogami; Nozomu Sasaki; Maaya Sakamoto
- Edited by: Harutoshi Ogata
- Music by: Takayuki Negishi
- Production company: Madhouse
- Distributed by: Shochiku Co., Ltd.; Bandai Visual
- Release date: July 15, 2000
- Running time: 82 minutes; 10 minutes (Leave It to Kero-chan!); 92 minutes (total)
- Country: Japan
- Language: Japanese

Cardcaptor Sakura Movie 2: The Sealed Card (Note: Also known as Cardcaptor Sakura the Movie: The Sealed Card (Japanese: 劇場版カードキャプターさくら封印されたカード, Hepburn: Gekijō-ban Kādokyaputā Sakura Fūin Sareta Kādo) in Japan) is a 2000 Japanese animated romance fantasy film directed by Morio Asaka and written by Nanase Ohkawa; the film is based on the Cardcaptor Sakura manga series by manga artist group Clamp. Produced by Madhouse and co-distributed by Shochiku and Bandai Visual, The Sealed Card serves as a finale to the anime television series, and is the second feature-length film following the 1999 film. The film follows Sakura Kinomoto as she faces the final Clow Card alongside her friends and allies, and comes to terms with her romantic feelings for Syaoran Li. The film stars the voices of Sakura Tange, Junko Iwao, Aya Hisakawa, Masaya Onosaka, Tomokazu Seki, Megumi Ogata, Motoko Kumai, Yukana Nogami, Nozomi Sasaki and Maaya Sakamoto. The Sealed Card was released in Japan on July 15, 2000, alongside Leave It to Kero-chan! short film.

The film won the Feature Film Award at the 2000 Animation Kobe. It was released on DVD in 2003. It received a limited theatrical release for the first time in the US on January 31, 2018. Discotek Media released the film for the first time on high definition Blu-ray in North America on July 31, 2018. It was followed by Cardcaptor Sakura: Clear Card in 2018.

== Plot ==
Eriol Hiiragizawa's house is demolished to make way for a new amusement park in Tomoeda, activating a Clow Card, the Nothing, hidden underneath the house. After the park is built, she hides in its clock tower and begins secretly stealing the Sakura Cards from Sakura Kinomoto. Sakura faces her own challenges, having the leading role in a play her school is putting on as part of Tomoeda's annual festival, and her own feelings towards her friend Syaoran Li, who confessed to her before returning to Hong Kong. Sakura and her best friend Tomoyo Daidoji visit the amusement park, where Sakura senses a magical aura. Running into the park, she bumps into Syaoran and Meiling Li, returning for a visit planned by Tomoyo and Meiling to get Sakura to confess to Syaoran.

Over the next few days, Sakura and her friends rehearse the play, and although Sakura repeatedly attempts to confess to Syaoran, she is interrupted each time. At the same time, they also notice that several locations and items in Tomoeda are disappearing. While out at an amusement park, Sakura and Syaoran witness one of the Sakura Cards vanishing and chase it to a hall of mirrors, where they encounter the Nothing, who steals several more of Sakura's cards.

Sakura and Kero are contacted by Eriol from England, who explains the Nothing was created to balance the positive magic of the Clow Cards with Sakura's own negative magic. The Nothing was released due to Sakura changing the cards' power from Clow Reed's to her own, resulting in a part of Tomoeda being erased every time the Nothing steals a card. Eriol warns Sakura that when she seals the Nothing card, her greatest feeling at the time, namely her love for Syaoran, will be erased as payment. Sakura informs Syaoran, but he concludes the sacrifice is their only option. Sakura runs off in tears but is consoled by Yue, the second guardian of the cards and Yukito's true form. During another rehearsal, the Nothing attacks the school, injuring Takashi Yamazaki who was to play the lead role opposite Sakura, so Syaoran steps in.

During the play, the Nothing's power spreads and erases many of Sakura's friends and family. Sakura, Syaoran, Kero, and Yue go to the amusement park and battle the Nothing, who erases Kero and Yue. Syaoran attacks her on the Ferris wheel but is caught in her destructive spheres and vanishes. Sakura pursues the Nothing to the clock tower, where she is stripped of her last cards apart from the Love card she created with her own magic after Syaoran left for Hong Kong. Sakura learns that the Nothing collected the cards so she would not be alone anymore, but Sakura promises that she will never be isolated again and seals the Nothing. However, the required toll instead comes from Syaoran who tells Sakura he will fall in love with her all over again.

The Nothing and the Love card fuse into one, becoming the Hope Card as Sakura tearfully confesses to Syaoran. She is shocked when he replies that he feels the same, discovering that the fusion averted the toll. The Nothing's powers are then reversed, reviving Tomoeda and its inhabitants. Sakura springs across the reforming clock tower to Syaoran's arms, together at last.

== Cast ==
Character	Japanese	English
Sakura Kinomoto	Sakura Tange	Kari Wahlgren
Syaoran Li	Motoko Kumai	Mona Marshall
Tomoyo Daidoji	Junko Iwao	Michelle Ruff
Kero	Aya Hisakawa; Masaya Onosaka (True form)	Wendee Lee; Dave Wittenberg (True form)
Meiling Li	Yukana Nogami	Julie Maddalena
Toya Kinomoto	Tomokazu Seki	Kirk Thornton
Yukito Tsukishiro / Yue	Megumi Ogata	Steve Staley
Fujitaka Kinomoto	Hideyuki Tanaka	Michael McConnohie
Eriol Hiiragizawa	Sasaki Nozomu	Johnny Yong Bosch
Kaho Mizuki	Emi Shinohara	Philece Sampler
Spinel Sun	Yumi Tōma	Philece Sampler
Rika Sasaki	Tomoko Kawakami	Stevie Bloch
Naoko Yanagisawa	Emi Motoi	Sherry Lynn
Chiharu Mihara	Miwa Matsumoto	Dorothy Elias-Fahn
Takashi Yamazaki	Issei Miyazaki	Joshua Seth
Sonomi Daidouji	Miki Itō	Wendee Lee
Yoshiyuki Terada	Toru Furusawa	Steven Blum
The Nothing Card	Maaya Sakamoto	Lia Sargent

== Soundtrack ==
Containing 32 tracks of background instrumental songs and vocal tracks used within the movie, Cardcaptor Sakura Movie 2: The Sealed Card Original Soundtrack was released in Japan on August 2, 2000, by Victor Entertainment.

The film's theme song is "Ashita e no Melody" (明日へのメロディー; lit. "Melody to Tomorrow") by Chaka. The song was released as a single on July 12, 2000, and peaked at #43 on the Oricon Weekly Singles Chart.

== Bonus art ==
Madhouse also brought out several pieces of high quality artwork, postcards and illustrated poster art (including the final scene bonus poster). The Special Edition DVD featured a separate art gallery section along with a booklet and pencil boards. CLAMP also brought out an artbook titled "The complete book of the animated movie Cardcaptor Sakura - The Sealed Card" in October 2000 which also featured interviews with CLAMP and the voice actors for the Cardcaptor Sakura series.

== Reception ==
Ridwan Khan noted that understanding the film required knowledge of Cardcaptor Sakura's second season. Chris Beveridge called the movie though "a lot of fun" praising its closure even though saying that at times the plot was repetitive. Beveridge also felt the Kero-Chan Theatrical Event special was the best extra. Allen Divers of Anime News Network noted that the English dub was closer to the Japanese than previous English dubs, even with Sakura's trademark expression "Hoe!", and that the voice actors did a great job of matching the emotions of the original Japanese ones. He felt the movie was a satisfying conclusion to the series. Carlos Ross of THEM Anime Reviews felt that the plot of the film was more substantial than the plot for the first film, and enjoyed the two storylines of Sakura's emotions and the final card. The second Cardcaptor Sakura movie also won the Feature Film Award at the 2000 Animation Kobe.
