= Emi Motoi =

Japanese actress and voice actress (born 1971)

Emi Motoi (本井 えみ, Motoi Emi; born October 11, 1971 in Kanagawa) is a Japanese actress and voice actress affiliated with Production Baobab.

== Filmography ==
=== Television animation ===
- Yumi Kusaka (First), Tomochan, Cameraman in Crayon Shin-chan (1995)
- Saaya Hanazono in Mama Loves the Poyopoyo-Saurus (1995)
- Himeko Jougasaki, Shōta Yamada in Chibi Maruko-chan (1995)
- Maid in Fushigi Yûgi (1995)
- Girl in Romeo's Blue Skies (1995)
- Chisato/Mrs. Roku in Magical Girl Pretty Sammy (1996)
- Mikako Sato in Martian Successor Nadesico (1996)
- Yuko Ohse in Revolutionary Girl Utena (1997)
- Naoko Yanagisawa in Cardcaptor Sakura (1998)
- Jessica in Trigun (1998)
- Goro's Mother in Angel Tales (2001)
- Shimizu Mother Major (2005)
- Sister in Atashin'chi (2002)
- Young Kouya in The Twelve Kingdoms (2002)
- Kyabetsu in Croquette! (2003)
- Kaoru Ichinose in Detective Academy Q (2003)
- Kyabetsu in Human Crossing (2003)
- Marine in Fullmetal Alchemist (2003)
- Chappu in MÄR (2005)
- Etsuko Ichikawa in Darker than Black (2007)
- Carine ne Britannia in Code Geass (2008)
- Chouun, Shiryuu (Sei) in Koihime Musou (2008)
- Manager in Captain Earth (2014)

=== Theatrical animation ===
- Naoko Yanagisawa in Cardcaptor Sakura Movie 2: The Sealed Card (2000)
- Ai in Inuyasha the Movie: Fire on the Mystic Island (2004)

=== OVA ===
- Kumiko Nagashima in Dokyusei 2 (1996)
- Chouun, Shiryuu (Sei) in Koihime Musou OVA (2009)

=== Video games ===
- Amy Rose in Sonic Shuffle (2000)
- Arle Nadja and Doppelganger Arle in Puyo Puyon (1999)
- Chouun, Shiryuu (Sei) in Koihime Musou (2007)
- Chouun, Shiryuu (Sei) in Shin Koihime Musou (2008)
- Kyoko Morimura in First Kiss Story (1998)
- Maria in Private Nurse (2002)
- Moeko Itou in Shiny Days (2012)
- Moeko Itou in Strip Battle Days 2 (2016)
- Sumire Nosaki in Tokimeki Memorial 2 (1999)
- Shizuku Mizumo in Yume no Tsubasa (2000)
- Yuko in Kisetsu wo Dakishimete (1998)
- Yuuko Kouzuki in Muv-Luv (2003)
