= Cardcaptor Sakura: The Movie =

1999 film by Morio Asaka

- Theatrical release poster
- Japanese: 劇場版カードキャプターさくら
- Revised Hepburn: Gekijō-ban Kādokyaputā Sakura
- Directed by: Morio Asaka
- Screenplay by: Nanase Ohkawa
- Based on: Cardcaptor Sakura by Clamp
- Produced by: Kazuhiko Ikeguchi; Tatsuya Ono
- Starring: Sakura Tange; Junko Iwao; Aya Hisakawa; Tomokazu Seki; Megumi Ogata; Hideyuki Tanaka; Motoko Kumai; Yukana Nogami; Megumi Hayashibara
- Cinematography: Hisao Shirai
- Edited by: Harutoshi Ogata
- Music by: Takayuki Negishi
- Production company: Madhouse
- Distributed by: Shochiku
- Release date: August 21, 1999
- Running time: 83 minutes
- Country: Japan
- Language: Japanese

Cardcaptor Sakura: The Movie (Japanese: 劇場版カードキャプターさくら, Hepburn: Gekijō-ban Kādokyaputā Sakura) is a 1999 Japanese animated fantasy film directed by Morio Asaka and written by Nanase Ohkawa; the film is based on the manga series of the same name by manga artist group Clamp. Produced by Madhouse and co-distributed by Shochiku and Bandai Visual, the story is set between the first and second seasons of the television series; Sakura Kinomoto and her friends as they travel to Hong Kong and encounter a vengeful spirit who was hurt by Clow Reed in the past. The film stars the voices of Sakura Tange, Junko Iwao, Aya Hisakawa, Tomokazu Seki, Megumi Ogata, Hideyuki Tanaka, Motoko Kumai, Yukana Nogami and Megumi Hayashibara. It was released in Japan on August 21, 1999, and won the Feature Film Award at the 1999 Animation Kobe. A second film, Cardcaptor Sakura Movie 2: The Sealed Card, was released in 2000.

== Plot ==
Sakura Kinomoto, Cardcaptor of the Clow Cards, successfully seals the Arrow Card with help from her friends Syaoran Li, Kero, Tomoyo Daidoji, and Meiling Li. That night, Sakura experiences a strange dream where two pieces of cloth pull her underwater. After school ends for spring break, Sakura and Tomoyo visit the "Twin Bells" shop where Sakura participates in a lottery to win a vacation to Hong Kong. As Sakura reaches for a lottery ball, one magically flies into her hand, the winning ball for the vacation. Sakura goes with Tomoyo, Kero, her big brother Toya and his best friend Yukito Tsukishiro, who Sakura has a crush on.

As the group tour the city, Sakura experiences the dream again, this time including two malevolent birds and a mysterious woman wearing the floating clothes. During a tour of the Yuen Po Street Bird Garden (also referred to as "Bird Street"), Sakura spots the two birds and pursues them across the city, finding an old water well where the clothes emerge and hypnotize her. As Sakura is drawn towards the well, Syaoran appears and scares the birds away. Reuniting with the others including Meiling, Sakura is taken to the Li family estate, where she meets Syaoran's four eccentric older sisters and his mother, Yelan, a powerful sorceress who senses Sakura is in danger. Staying for the night, Sakura experiences the dream again where the woman attacks her. Yelan takes Sakura outside and warns her that the woman is extremely powerful and is deliberately contacting Sakura. The next day, Syaoran and Meiling are forced to accompany Sakura and the group around Hong Kong to aid them if something should happen.

Sakura spots the birds again and pursues them with Kero. They chase them down to an antique store, where they come across an old book that has a picture of the woman on the cover. Sakura is hypnotised again and opens the book before her friends, flooding the shop and transporting the group to another dimension where the woman dwells. The birds are revealed to be her clothes. The woman, actually a sorceress named Madoushi, attacks Sakura in rage, believing she had summoned Clow Reed, creator of the Clow Cards. Sakura discovers that her friends, except for Syaoran, have been taken prisoner, and Madoushi demands Clow come in exchange for their freedom. Syaoran attempts to distract Madoushi so Sakura can rescue Tomoyo, but is captured as well. Sakura escapes with Kero and Tomoyo back to the antique store, but find the book has vanished. Kero realizes he knows Madoushi, and explains that she was a fortune teller who was unintentionally put out of business by Clow when his predictions turned out to be more accurate than hers. Madoushi challenged him to one fight after another and her hatred bound her to another dimension, but is likely unaware she is a spirit. Sakura realizes the well appeared on the book cover and that it is another entrance to Madoushi's prison.

Sakura goes to the well where she encounters Yelan, who breaks the shield surrounding the well to allow Sakura and Kero to enter. Sakura confronts Madoushi, who uses the magic of Sakura's friends to escape her prison, but is shocked by Hong Kong's modern-day appearance. Sakura and Kero follow, but Madoushi captures Sakura and holds her prisoner. When Sakura tells her of Clow's passing, Madoushi angrily tries to drown Sakura by trapping her in a flooded skyscraper with her clothes. Sakura uses the Arrow Card to escape and she confronts Madoushi, sympathizing with the sorceress and confirms Clow is dead. Madoushi dissolves into water, passing on, but releases Sakura's friends. While Toya and Yukito have no memory of what happened, Sakura tells Tomoyo and Kero they may have to visit Hong Kong again in the future.

== Voice cast ==
Character	Japanese	English
Sakura Kinomoto / Sakura Avalon	Sakura Tange	Carly McKillip
Tomoyo Daidoji / Madison Taylor	Junko Iwao	Maggie Blue O'Hara
Syaoran Li / Li Showron	Motoko Kumai	Rhys Huber
Kero	Aya Hisakawa	Matt Hill
Meiling Li / Meilin Rae	Yukana Nogami	Nicole Oliver
Toya Kinomoto / Tori Avalon	Tomokazu Seki	Tony Sampson
Yukito Tsukishiro / Julian Star	Megumi Ogata	Samuel Vincent
Fujitaka Kinomoto / Aiden Avalon	Hideyuki Tanaka	Brian Drummond
Clow Reed	Kazuo Hayashi	Dale Wilson
Yelan Li	Kikuko Inoue	Stevie Vallance
Madoushi / Su Yung	Megumi Hayashibara	Nicole Oliver
Fudie Li	Yuriko Yamaguchi	–
Shiefa Li	Chiyako Shibahara	–
Fanren Li	Rika Wakusawa	–
Feimei Li	Sachiko Sugawara	–
Yoshiyuki Terada / Mr. Terada	Toru Furusawa	Brian Drummond
Maki Matsumoto / Maggie	Kotono Mitsuishi	Nicole Oliver

== Production ==
The same production staff that produced the anime television series adaptation of Cardcaptor Sakura also produced Cardcaptor Sakura: The Movie. The film was animated by Madhouse, produced by Bandai Visual, directed by Morio Asaka, written by Nanase Ohkawa of Clamp, and featured character designs by Kumiko Takahashi, who based the designs on Clamp's original illustrations. The art director for the film was Katsufumi Hariu, and there were three animation directors: Hitoshi Ueda, Kumiko Takahashi and Kunihiko Sakurai. The music was produced by Takayuki Negishi, with Masafumi Mima as the sound director.

== Media releases ==
Cardcaptor Sakura: The Movie was released on VHS, LD and DVD in Japan by Bandai Visual on February 25, 2000. The film was re-released on November 25, 2000, on VHS, May 25, 2007, on DVD in a two-disc set with Cardcaptor Sakura Movie 2: The Sealed Card, and on December 22, 2009, on DVD. Nelvana confirmed plans to release a Cardcaptors film on their website in December 2000, and followed up with a press release saying it was planned for Q4 2001. The company ultimately released an English dubbed version of this film with Voicebox productions retaining the same name and story changes as its main Cardcaptors dub, although it was dubbed visually uncut and released in both edited and uncut editions. This version first aired on Teletoon in its native Canada on April 6, 2002. As with the television series, Pioneer Entertainment also released the film on home video with the original Japanese audio and English subtitles. Both the edited and unedited versions were released on VHS and DVD on March 26, 2002. Discotek Media released the film on Blu-ray Disc and DVD on September 30, 2014, in North America. The film was screened in theaters again on January 21, 2017, in Japan to celebrate the 20th anniversary of the manga.

The theme song for the film is "Tōi Kono Machi de" (遠いこの街で; "In This Distant City") by Naomi Kaitani. The single containing the song was released on August 11, 1999, by Victor Entertainment. The film's original soundtrack was released on August 25, 1999, by Victor Entertainment containing one disc and 30 tracks.
