= Sakura Tange =

Japanese voice actress (born 1973)

- 丹下 桜
- Born: March 24, 1973 (age 53); Ichinomiya, Aichi, Japan
- Occupations: Voice actress; singer; writer
- Years active: 1994–2000, 2005, 2009–present
- Notable work: Cardcaptor Sakura as Sakura Kinomoto; Money Puzzle Exchanger as Sakura Mitsukoshi; Loveplus as Kobayakawa Rinko; Anyamaru Tantei Kiruminzuu as Hatori Kanon; Fate/Extra as Saber/Nero Claudius; Girl Friend Beta as Chloe Lemaire; You're Under Arrest as Saori Saga; Granblue Fantasy as Cagliostro
- Musical career
- Genres: J-Pop; Anison
- Instrument: Vocals
- Years active: 1997–present
- Labels: Konami; Wonder Factory
- Website: sakura-alamode.com

Sakura Tange (丹下 桜, Tange Sakura; born March 24, 1973) is a Japanese voice actress, singer and writer who was born in Ichinomiya, Aichi. She is best known for providing the voice of Sakura Kinomoto in the anime series Cardcaptor Sakura and before that, she voiced some of SNK's characters, such as Yuri Sakazaki in drama CD adaptation of The King of Fighters '94, Cham Cham in drama CD adaptation of Samurai Shodown II and Sakura Mitsukoshi in the Neo Geo puzzle game Money Puzzle Exchanger.

Tange has done voice acting for anime, radio shows, computer games and live events. She worked for Aoni Production and Konami, and had retired from voice acting for a period since 2000, but announced her return to being an anime voice actress in September 2009. She has released music under several artist names, including Little Seraph, Angelic Alice, Angel, and Sakura.

== Filmography ==
=== Anime series ===
1994

- Nintama Rantarou (season 2), Yuki
- Marmalade Boy, Suzu Sakuma

1995

- Sailor Moon SuperS, Miharu Akiyama (Ep.139)

1996

- You're Under Arrest (season 1), Saga Saori

1997

- Android Announcer Maico 2010, MAICO
- Burn Up Excess, Lilica Ebett
- Maze, Mill
- Anime Ganbare Goemon, Omitsu

1998

- Gasaraki, Sunao Murai
- Cardcaptor Sakura, Sakura Kinomoto

1999

- Infinite Ryvius, Kozue Izumi
- Trouble Chocolate, Hinano
- I'm Gonna Be An Angel!, Muse

2009

- Anyamaru Tantei Kiruminzuu, Kanon Hatori

2010

- The World God Only Knows, Yotsuba Sugimoto

2011

- Dog Days, Violet Amaretto

2012

- Aquarion Evol, Crea Dolosera
- Detective Conan, Yonehara Sakurako
- Dog Days, Violet Amaretto

2014

- The Irregular at Magic High School, Haruka Ono
- If Her Flag Breaks, Mei Daimyouzamurai
- Girl Friend Beta, Chloe Lemaire
- Chaika – The Coffin Princess: Avenging Battle, Chaika Kamaz

2015

- Dog Days, Violet Amaretto

2016

- Detective Conan, Yonehara Sakurako (Ep.814–815)

2017

- Fate/Apocrypha, Assassin of Black/Jack the Ripper
- Hozuki's Coolheadedness, Chun

2018

- Cardcaptor Sakura: Clear Card, Sakura Kinomoto
- Fate/Extra Last Encore, Saber/Nero Claudius
- Sword Art Online: Alicization, Cardinal

2019

- The Rising of the Shield Hero, Fitoria

2020

- Bofuri, Drazō
- Princess Connect! Re:Dive, Illya / Illya Ornstein
- Auto Boy - Carl from Mobile Land, Purin-chan

2022

- Princess Connect! Re:Dive Season 2, Illya / Illya Ornstein
- The Rising of the Shield Hero Season 2, Fitoria

2025

- #Compass 2.0: Combat Providence Analysis System, Voidoll/Bugdoll
- The Banished Court Magician Aims to Become the Strongest, Rosa Alhatia

=== Original video animation ===
- Astarotte no Omocha! EX (2011), Fii
- Miyuki-chan in Wonderland (1995), Yuri
- Fire Emblem (1996), Shiida
- Burn Up W (1996), Lilica Ebett
- Voogie's Angel (1997–1998), Midi
- Melty Lancer (1999), Angela
- Carnival Phantasm (2011–2012), Saber Extra
- Granblue Fantasy The Animation: Kabocha no Lantern (2017), Cagliostro

=== Anime films ===
- A Dog of Flanders (1997), Alois
- Cardcaptor Sakura: The Movie (1999), Sakura Kinomoto
- Cardcaptor Sakura Movie 2: The Sealed Card (2000), Sakura Kinomoto

=== Video games ===
- Tokimeki Memorial (1994), Akiho Minori
- Dead or Alive (1996), Kasumi
- Money Idol Exchanger (1997), Mitsukoshi Sakura/Exchanger
- Princess Quest (1998), Custard
- Ayakashi Ninden Kunoichiban (PlayStation) (1998), Tsukiha Hisano
- Dead or Alive 2 (1999), Kasumi
- Loveplus (2009), Kobayakawa Rinko
- Fate/Extra (2010), Saber/Nero Claudius
- Dead or Alive: Dimensions (2011), Kasumi Alpha, Alpha-152
- Rune Factory Oceans (2011), Electra
- Granblue Fantasy (2014), Cagliostro, Macula Marius
- Fate/Grand Order (2015), Nero Claudius, Jack the Ripper, Sodom's Beast/Draco
- Fate/Extella: The Umbral Star (2016), Nero Claudius
- Mobius Final Fantasy (2015), Echo
- Tokyo Necro (2016), Sub-Con
- Honkai Impact 3rd (2017), Sirin
- Magia Record (2017), Kazumi Subaru
- Azur Lane (2017), Kitakaze, I-168
- Dragalia Lost (2018), Mitsuhide
- Princess Connect! Re:Dive (2018), Illya / Illya Ornstein
- Grimms Notes Repage (2019), Aesop
- 100% Orange Juice (2020), Alicianrone
- Granblue Fantasy Versus (2020), Cagliostro
- Girls' Frontline (2020), V-pm5, KH2002
- Mahjong Soul (2020), Elisa, Ayako Morikawa
- Blue Archive (2021–2024), Renkawa Cherino
- Fate/Grand Order Arcade (2021), Draco/Beast VI/S
- Fire Emblem Heroes (2022), Embla
- Sword Art Online: Last Recollection (2023), Cardinal
- Umamusume: Pretty Derby (2025), Haiseiko
- Fate/Extra Record (2027), Saber

=== Drama CDs ===
- The King of Fighters '94 (1995), Yuri Sakazaki
- Samurai Shodown II (1995), Cham Cham
- Money Idol Exchanger (1997), Mitsukoshi Sakura/Exchanger
- D.N.Angel Wink (1999), Risa Harada
- KOHA✩TALK (????), Nero Claudius

=== Dubbing ===
- Thomas the Tank Engine and Friends, Nancy
- Magic Adventures of Mumfie, Pinkey

== Discography ==
=== CD singles ===
Year	Song	Number
1997	Anata no Yarikata de Dakishimete	KIDA-7620
1997	Make You Smile	KIDA-7626
1997	Tune My Love	KIDA-7628
1997	2 Shoku dake no Palette	KIDA-7630
1998	Catch Up Dream	KIDA-7640
1998	Free	KIDA-7647
1998	Stand By Me	KIDA-7649
1999	Wonder Network/Private Link	KIDA-7652
1999	Bright Shine on Time	KMDS-1
1999	To Love	KMDS-2
1999	C.H.O.C.O.	AVDA-14006
2000	Mirai Kara no Air Mail	KMCS-7
2000	Anata ni Aitakute～Missing You～Millennium Dance Version	AVDA-14015

==== Singles as Little Seraph ====
Year	Song	Number
2000	AIR COMMUNICATION	WFCC-2001
2001	Kiseki no Kaze	WFCC-2002
2001	SUN SPLASH	WFCC-2005
2002	HOLY LOVE	WFCC-2009

==== Singles as Angel ====
- ANGEL
- SMILE
- CHEER
- HAPPY
- SWEET
- PEACE
- HEALING

==== Singles as Sakura ====
Year	Song	Number
2004	Cherry A La Mode～Hajimemashite～	WYCC-4000
2004	Cherry A La Mode～Ogenki desu ka?～	WYCC-4001
2004	Cherry A La Mode～Takaramono～	WYCC-4002
2004	Cherry A La Mode～Arigatou～	WYCC-4003
2005	Cherry A La Mode～Koko ni iru yo～	WYCC-4005
2005	Cherry A La Mode～Ohayou～	WYCC-4006
2005	Cherry A La Mode～Oyasumi～	WYCC-4007

==== Singles as Nero Claudius ====
- 2015: Grand

==== Singles as Cagliostro ====
- 2016: Nanokakan Kakete Sekai wo Tsukuru yori Kawaii Onnanoko Hitori Tsukutta Hou ga Ii ~GRANBLUE FANTASY~ 2016 (SVWC-70199)

=== CD albums ===
Year	Album	Number
1995	Love Stories	TKCA-70769
1996	Be Myself	KICA-7726
1997	MAKE YOU SMILE	KICA-7802
1998	New Frontier	KICA-789
1999	Alice	KICA-7956
1999	Neo-Generation	KMCS-4
2000	SAKURA	KMCS-8
2000	MARINE	KMCS-9
2001	SPUR	KMCS-19
2009	Sakura Kimi ni Sakimasu You ni - mini-album	WYCC-4013

==== Albums as Little Seraph ====
Year	Album	Number
2001	WONDER MUSEUM	WFCC-2006
2003	WONDER MUSEUM 2	WFCC-2014
2004	FULL VOICE (mini-album)	WFCC-2020

==== Albums as Angel ====
- Cherish
- 2003: Rainbow

==== Albums as Sakura ====
Year	Album	Number
2005	Cherry A La Mode Collection 1	WYCC-4004
2005	Cherry A La Mode Collection 2	WYCC-4008
2006	Sora to Kaze to Kimi to Boku	WYCC-4009
2007	10th Anniversary Best～ Sakura Selection	WYCC-4010
2007	venusnote	WYCC-4012

==== Albums as Tange Sakura ====
- 2009: 桜きみに咲きますように…
- 2010: Musees de Sakura
