= Morio Asaka =

Japanese storyboard artist and director

- 浅香 守生
- Born: March 11, 1967 (age 59); Nishinomiya, Japan
- Education: Osaka Designers' College
- Occupations: Storyboard artist, director
- Years active: 1987-present
- Known for: Cardcaptor Sakura; Chobits; Gunslinger Girl; Nana; Chihayafuru; My Love Story!!

Morio Asaka (浅香 守生, Asaka Morio; born March 11, 1967) is a Japanese storyboard artist and director.

After graduating Osaka Designers' College, Asaka entered Madhouse. He was inspired to become a director by Phoenix: Yamato Chapter and made his debut as an episode director in episode 40 of Yawara!. He made his chief directorial debut with the 1993 OVA POPS. His noted works include, among others, Cardcaptor Sakura (his directorial anime television series debut), Chobits, Gunslinger Girl, Nana, Chihayafuru, and My Love Story!!. In 1999, he won the Theatrical Film Award in the Animation Kobe awards.

== Filmography ==
=== TV series ===
- Cardcaptor Sakura (1998–2000) - Director
- Galaxy Angel (2001) - Director
- Galaxy Angel Z (2002) - Director
- Chobits (2002) - Director
- Gunslinger Girl (2003–2004) - Director
- Nana (2006–2007) - Director
- No Longer Human (2009) - Director
- Chihayafuru (2011–2012) - Director
- Chihayafuru 2 (2013) - Director
- My Love Story!! (2015) - Director
- Cardcaptor Sakura: Clear Card (2018) - Director
- Chihayafuru 3 (2019) - Director
- My Love Story with Yamada-kun at Lv999 (2023) - Director
- Scenes from Awajima (2026) - Director

=== TV specials ===
- Yawara! Special: Zutto Kimi no Koto ga... (1996) - Director

=== Films ===
- Cardcaptor Sakura: The Movie (1999) - Director
- Cardcaptor Sakura Movie 2: The Sealed Card (2000) - Director
- Leave It To Kero! Movie (2000) - Story composition

=== OVAs ===
- POPS (1993; director)

=== Other works ===
- Attack! Future's Challenge! J League (1996; artbook)

Tankōbon: Shiobunsha, art: Akihiko Tanaka, ISBN 4-8113-0299-0

- Noel (1996; game, storyboards)

PlayStation game.

- Ryūjin Numa (2001; storyboards)

Special anime museum screening by Shotaro Ishinomori.

- Last Order: Final Fantasy VII (2005; director, storyboards)

Limited-edition special DVD production included in Final Fantasy VII: Advent Children.
