= Nozomi Sasaki =

Nozomi Sasaki may refer to:

- Nozomi Sasaki (model) (born 1988), Japanese model
- Nozomi Sasaki (voice actress) (born 1983), Japanese voice actress
