= Linda Rae Jurgens =

American television and film actress

Linda Rae Jurgens is an American television and film actress.

== Biography ==
Jurgens was part of the cast of Top Gun (1986), in which she played the wife of Naval aviator Mike 'Viper' Metcalf played by Tom Skerritt.

== Filmography ==
Year	Title	Role	Notes
1986	Top Gun	Mrs. Metcalf	
1998	Jerome	Amy, the Waitress	
2018	Warning: No Trespassing	Reporter 2	
2018	Mister Sadpants	Gloria Mckinley	
