= Daidōji family =

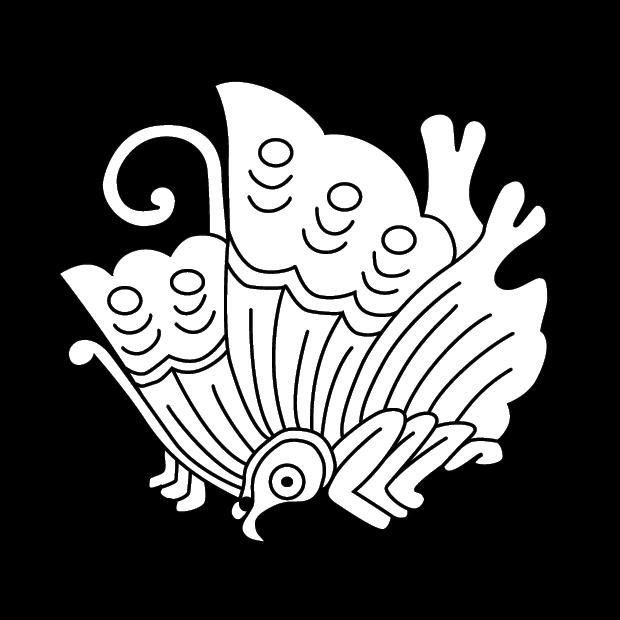
Crest of Taira family

The Daidōji clan (大道寺氏) were a Japanese samurai kin group in the Kamakura period.

== History ==
The Daidōji were descendants of the Taira.

Daidōji Masashige was the governor of Suruga Province with an annual income of 180,000 koku. In 1590, his forces were defeated by Maeda Toshiie. In 1591, Masahige killed himself (harakiri).

The Daidoji clan is one of the Japanese clans.

Its origin is considered to be Daido-ji Temple of present Ujitawara-cho, Tsuzuki County, Kyoto Prefecture. The Daidoji family was believed to have moved to Senbon Shaka-do Temple of Kyoto.

The Daidoji clan who had served the Owari domain was originally a vassal of the Gohojo clan. After the fall of the Hojo clan, Daidoji Shigenao, the second son of Daidōji Masashige who worked as the top at Kawagoe-jo Castle and governed 180 thousand koku crop yields, served the Maeda clan of Kaga Province and then began to serve Matsudaira Tadayoshi with two thousand Goku crop yields. Matsudaira Tadayoshi was the fourth son of Tokugawa Ieyasu and had been given 490 thousand koku crop yields in Owari Province. When Shigenao served Tadayoshi, he lived in the castle in Kiyosu, and in the vicinity of the site of his residence is still called Aza Daidoji, Kiyosu-machi, Kiyosu City, Aichi Prefecture.

After Tadayoshi's death, although Owari was given to Ieyasu's ninth son Tokugawa Yoshinao, Shigenao continuously served Yoshinao. After the Siege of Osaka, 500 koku crop yields were added, and he had 2500 koku in all.

== Notable clan leaders ==
- Daidōji Shigeoki
- Daidōji Masashige
