= Cardcaptor Sakura: Clear Card =

Manga series

- Cover of the first manga volume

カードキャプターさくら クリアカード編 (Kādokyaputā Sakura Kuria Kādo-hen)
- Genre: Magical girl; romance
- Manga
- Written by: Clamp
- Published by: Kodansha
- English publisher: NA: Kodansha Comics
- Magazine: Nakayoshi
- Original run: July 2016 – January 2024
- Volumes: 16
- Original video animation
- Directed by: Morio Asaka
- Produced by: Chiyo Kawazoe
- Written by: Nanase Okawa
- Music by: Takayuki Negishi
- Studio: Madhouse
- Licensed by: Crunchyroll
- Released: September 13, 2017
- Runtime: 27 minutes
- Anime television series
- Directed by: Morio Asaka
- Written by: Nanase Ohkawa
- Music by: Takayuki Negishi
- Studio: Madhouse
- Licensed by: Crunchyroll; SEA: Medialink
- Original network: NHK BS Premium
- Original run: January 7, 2018 – June 10, 2018
- Episodes: 22
- icon

Cardcaptor Sakura: Clear Card (Japanese: カードキャプターさくら クリアカード編, Hepburn: Kādokyaputā Sakura Kuria Kādo-hen; lit. "Cardcaptor Sakura Clear Card Saga") is a Japanese shōjo manga series written and illustrated by the manga group Clamp. It is a sequel to Clamp's manga Cardcaptor Sakura and focuses on Sakura Kinomoto in junior high school. The manga was serialized in Kodansha's Nakayoshi magazine between the July 2016 and January 2024 issues, with the chapters collected in 16 tankōbon volumes. A 22-episode anime television series adaptation produced by Madhouse, featuring the cast and staff from the original series, aired from January to June 2018, which loosely adapts the first 24 chapters.

== Plot ==
Sakura Kinomoto is starting junior high school alongside her friends and her boyfriend Syaoran Li, who has just returned to Tomoeda, and the two start dating after having been in a long-distance relationship since Syaoran's return to Hong Kong a few years earlier. During her first year in junior high school, Sakura encounters several magical incidents in Tomoeda, similar to what she experienced in Elementary School. After having a prophetic dream, the Sakura Cards turn blank and are rendered powerless, thus starting Sakura's quest to find out what is wrong. In the process, Sakura captures new cards; using the new and much stronger mystical dream key. Sakura befriends a transfer student named Akiho Shinomoto, who lives with her butler and guardian Yuna D. Kaito. The daughter of two powerful magicians, Akiho was left orphaned after her parents died in an accident, and later placed under Kaito's care. Akiho treasures Momo; what she believes to be a stuffed toy but is actually the guardian of a magical book.

Due to her growing powers, Sakura gains the ability to create new cards, and Syaoran's mother Yelan tells him of a prophecy that if Sakura's growing powers are left unchecked they could bring her disaster. Working with Eriol and the Sakura Cards, Syaoran takes possession of them for Sakura's safety and eventually reveals all to her. Learning that Kaito (whose magic makes him appear different to his actual, unknown age) is a sorcerer, Syaoran tries to reveal this as well to Sakura, but Kaito places a spell on Syaoran to prevent him from doing so, which Sakura later breaks. Kaito knows about Sakura's ability to create new cards, and has been causing the magical incidents so that Sakura can create a card that he needs for an unknown purpose.

Kaito is revealed to have been an orphan who became part of a secret magic society; one that collaborates with a clan of European magicians that seeks to bring all of the world's magic under their command (an agenda that Akiho's mother, their most powerful member, did not share). After Akiho's birth, members of her clan learnt that Akiho has no magic of her own, and both they and Kaito's society decide to use her as a tool for their agenda; implanting her with various spells that Kaito knows will cause Akiho to lose her soul. Akiho is entrusted into Kaito's care so that she can travel the world and acquire new magical knowledge. Going against both Akiho's clan and his own society, he hatches a plan to make Sakura create a card that he can use to not only absorb Akiho's magic into his body, but alter everyone's memories into making them believe that Sakura and Akiho are sisters. Kaito believes that Sakura and her family would keep her safe and happy. Kaito succeeds, but by misusing the magic inside of Akiho a seal that was placed on Kaito is activated; trapping him in a magical prison and wiping out the memories that everyone had of him.

Sakura believes Akiho to be her sister, but with the help of Momo and Akiho's late mother (who travels through time to reveal the truth to her) she learns how both her life and memories were rewritten, and finds and frees Kaito from his magical prison. Sakura uses her magic to ensure that most people will have their memories of Kaito and Akiho erased; thereby keeping them safe from their respective organisations. All but one of the Clear Cards become part of Momo's magical book, with the remaining card (Flight) staying with Sakura.

Due to circumstances, time stops still for Kaito, and he and Akiho leave Japan to find a cure for his condition. Kaito tells Syaoran that he will teach him time magic if he wishes; knowing that Syaoran would never misuse it. Akiho befriends Eriol while Tomoyo devotes herself to developing her sewing skills; looking forward to designing a wedding dress for Sakura for when Sakura and Syaoran one day get married. Moving to Germany, Kaito and Akiho stay in contact with Sakura and Syaoran, who are about to start their third and final year of junior high school. Momo is no longer with Akiho and Kaito, but assures Sakura when visiting her one day that Akiho will see her again.

Clear Card ends with Sakura vowing to continue moving forward and spending each precious day with the special people in her life, and meeting up with Syaoran to walk to school with him one morning; on her birthday. Syaoran surprises Sakura with a gift; telling Sakura that her birthday is the most special day to him. A touched Sakura pulls his hand close to her heart; telling him that he will always be the most special to her before hugging Syaoran while the cherry blossoms from the trees fall around them.

== Media ==
=== Manga ===
Cardcaptor Sakura: Clear Card is written and illustrated by the manga artist group Clamp. It was serialized in monthly shōjo (aimed at young girls) manga magazine Nakayoshi from the July 2016 issue sold on June 3 to the January 2024 issue sold on December 1, 2023. A bonus chapter was released in March 2024. The chapters were released in a collection of 16 tankōbon volumes by Kodansha between December 2017 and April 2024. Kodansha Comics released the series in English both digitally and in print.

=== Anime ===
A 22-episode anime television series adaptation aired from January 7 to June 10, 2018, with Morio Asaka, Nanase Ohkawa and Madhouse returning from the original anime series to direct, write and produce the new adaptation, respectively, loosely adapted from the first twenty-eight chapters of the manga. Kunihiko Hamada replaced Kumiko Takahashi as the character designer from the original series. The main cast from the original anime also returns to reprise their roles. An original video animation prequel titled Sakura and the Two Bears, which bridges the stories of the "Sakura Card Arc" and the "Clear Card Arc", had its world premiere at Anime Expo on July 1, 2017, and shipped in Japan as a DVD bundled with the special edition of volume 3 of the manga on September 13, 2017.

The first opening theme for the series is "Clear" by Maaya Sakamoto, while the first ending theme is "Jewelry" by Saori Hayami. Funimation premiered the simuldub on January 24, 2018. The second opening theme is "Rocket Beat" by Kiyono Yasuno while the second ending theme is "Rewind" by Minori Suzuki. The series was released in Japan on Blu-ray and DVD in eight volumes from May to November 2018. In 2019, Funimation released the series in two Blu-ray sets of 11 episodes each in North America on February 5 and July 2. Funimation released the complete series in one Blu-ray volume on August 11, 2020.

A sequel was announced at the Sakura Fes event on April 1, 2023, and will adapt the remaining story until its conclusion.

=== Other ===
Bushiroad and Monster Lab created a mobile game for iOS and Android titled Cardcaptor Sakura: Clear Card Happiness Memories and launched it on October 3, 2019. The game's theme song is "Flash" by Maaya Sakamoto. In May 2020, Bushiroad and Monster Lab announced they were ending services for the game on June 30, 2020, due to the "state of the game" and "current operations situation."

To date, two Clear Card drama CDs and two bonus manga stories have been released in Japan. Both drama CDs were released with special editions of Clear Card volumes 7 and 8, respectively. The first bonus manga story, which is about Sakura and Syaoran going on a date, was released with volume 8 of the Blu-ray release of the Clear Card anime. The second, titled "Until We Meet Again", which focused on the long-distance relationship Sakura and Syaoran entered into and maintained during his time back in Hong Kong, was released with a special edition of Clear Card volume 10. This special edition also came with a CD containing a song called "Letters Between The Stars;" a duet of Sakura and Syaoran singing about their love for each other.

== Reception ==
It was reported in April 2017 that over 1 million copies of the manga were in print in Japan. In reviewing volumes 1 and 2 of the manga, Erica Friedman, founder of Yuricon called the sequel "honest-to-goodness", and said that those who enjoy the original series will enjoy this manga, and said she was happy with "this kiddy ride full of pretty art and nice kids", but gave low-ratings for yuri themes.

The anime adaptation received mixed reviews. Miranda Sanchez of IGN reviewed the first two episodes of the series, praising the storytelling, and animation style, but was critical of the second episode, calling it "mundane". Geordi Demorest of Anime Feminist criticized the series, arguing that while the original Cardcaptor Sakura is beloved for its "LGBTQ-inclusiveness," this sequel seems "less actively progressive" and is missing the original focus on "explicitly representing LGBTQ characters". Lynzee Loveridge of Anime News Network wrote that she was unsure whether the series added "anything worthwhile to characters' stories" and argued that it is a "facsimile of the previous series", with no traditional villains.

Timothy Donohoo of CBR claimed that the series was "largely forgotten" by fans and the anime industry because it was a "disappointing affair for many" because it ran for 22 episodes and called it a "mediocre rehash" of the original and "painfully mediocre". Charles Solomon of Animation Scoop praised the series for its animation quality, but said that the series "faltered" by copying the original series "too closely", had an ending that was too abrupt, and stated that elements like Tomoyo's love for Sakura "fell by the wayside." Jack Eaton of Gamerant noted that the series did not receive "the same critical and commercial success" as the original, and called for a "a second chance at a sequel" which is more fitting than this series, or a remastering of the original. Shamus Kelley, in his review of the final three episodes of the series for Den of Geek, criticizing the ending as a "convoluted mess", called the plot "heavy-handed", noted the series focus on Tomoyo's "endless obsession with Sakura", and praised the series as "really fun" but fighting "against itself." In reviews of other episodes within the series, Kelley criticized the plot as "fairly lackluster", not expanding on possible queer themes, "lazily aping" the original series, and described the plot as creepy in relation to interactions between Kaito and Akiho. Tim Jones and Stig Høgset of THEM Anime Reviews gave the series a more positive review. Jones said he had some hesitation to start the series, as it was three years after Sailor Moon Crystal, while Høgset called the show like "a fun family reunion" and praised the background art for the series.
