= Moon magic =

Rituals at the phases of the Moon

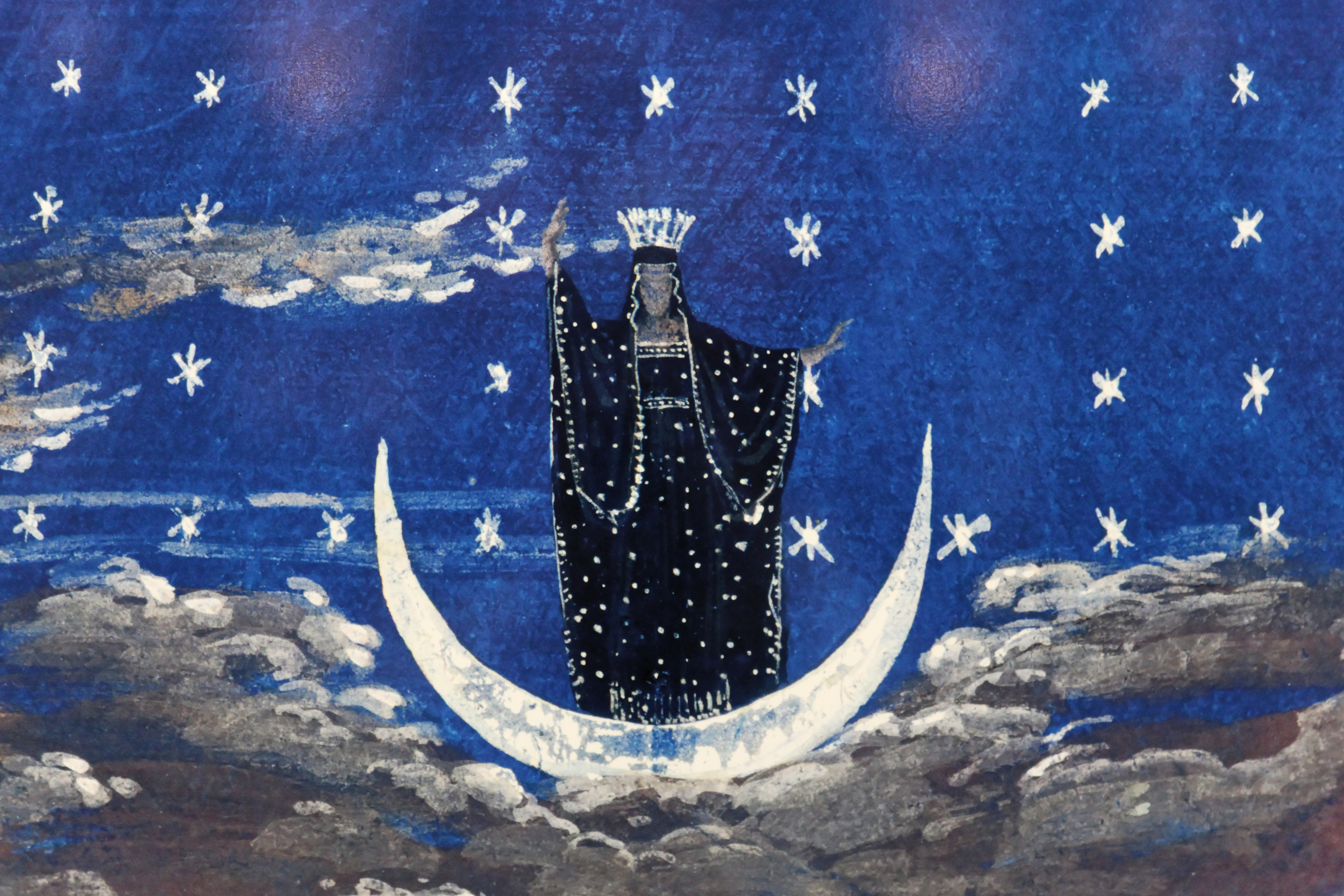
The Queen of the Night in The Magic Flute

There is a belief common to many cultures that rituals at the time of different phases of the moon can bring about physical or psychological change or transformation. These rituals have historically occurred on or around the full moon and to a lesser extent the new moon. Such practices are common amongst adherents of neopagan and witchcraft systems such as Wicca.

== New age interpretations ==
Moon Magic is the title of a number of neopagan books:

- Fortune, Dion (1979) Moon Magic. Boston: Weiser Books. ISBN 0-87728-423-7. A novel by esoteric author Dion Fortune which is a sequel to The Sea Priestess.
- Jaffer, Hassan (2005) Moon Magic. Willowdale: Astrograph Inc. An annually published astrological self-help guide by astrologer Hassan Jaffer, using lunar cycles.
- Reid, Lori (1998) Moon Magic: How to Use the Moon's Phases to Inspire and Influence Your Relationships, Home Life, and Business. New York, NY: Three Rivers Press. ISBN 0-609-80347-6. A self-help guide using the Moon's cycles by astrologer Lori Reid.

== See also ==
- Esbat
- Magic (supernatural)
- Magic and religion
- Modern paganism and New Age
- Wicca
- Witchcraft
