= Alice, I Think =

Alice, I Think may refer to:

- Alice, I Think (novel), a 2000 novel by Susan Juby
- Alice, I Think (TV series), a Canadian television series based on the novel
