= Britt McKillip =

Canadian actress

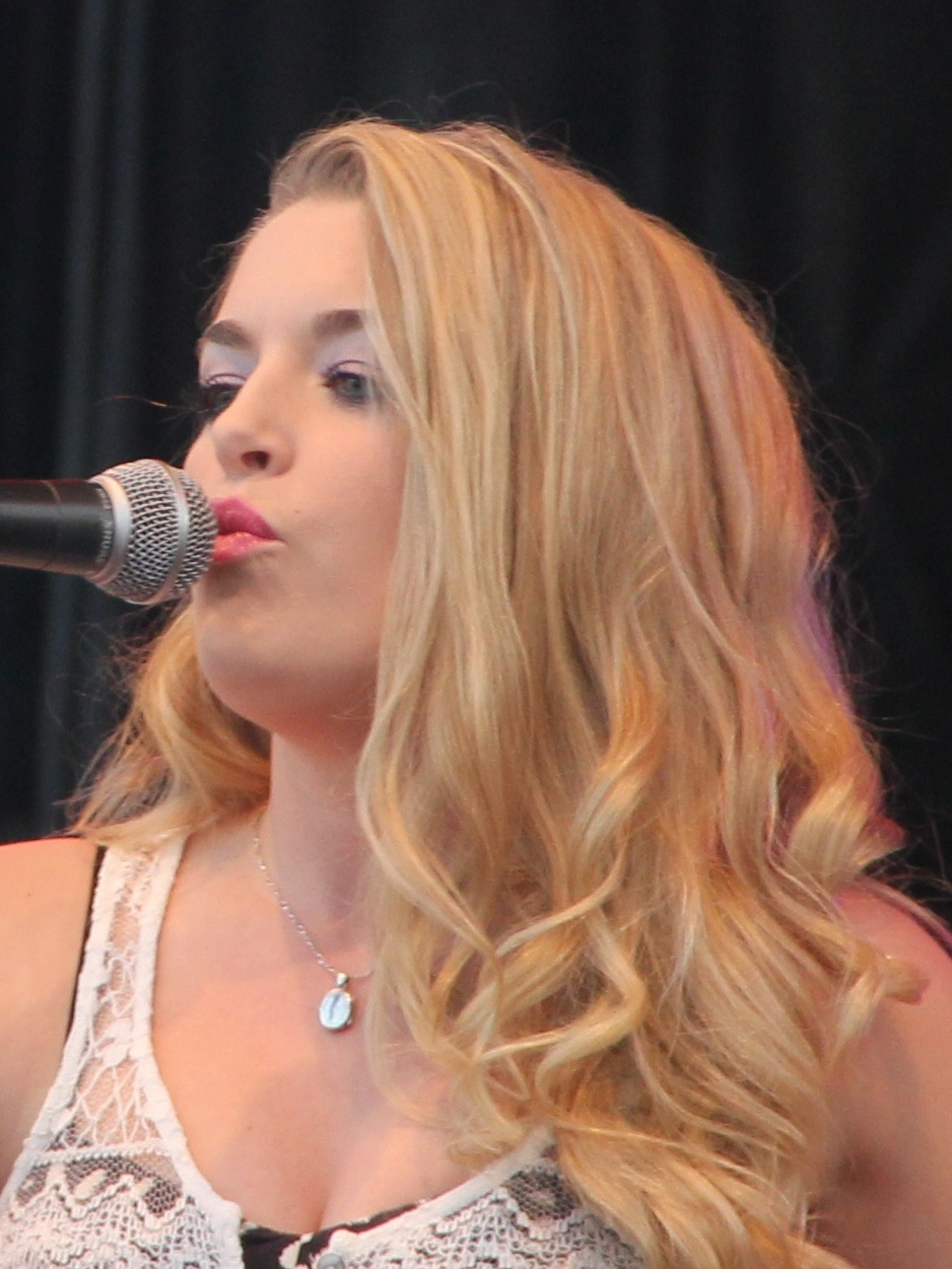
- McKillip in 2012
- Occupations: Actress; singer
- Years active: 1996–present
- Relatives: Carly McKillip (sister)

Britt McKillip is a Canadian actress and singer. Her credits include the film Scary Godmother: Halloween Spooktacular and its sequel Scary Godmother: The Revenge of Jimmy, and her role as Reggie Lass in the television series Dead Like Me, the film Dead Like Me: Life After Death (based on the series), and her voiceover roles as Lola Bunny in Baby Looney Tunes, Sabrina Spellman in Sabrina's Secret Life, Amethyst van der Troll in Trollz, Cloe in Bratz, Blueberry Muffin in Strawberry Shortcake's Berry Bitty Adventures, Princess Cadance in My Little Pony: Friendship Is Magic, and Princess Harumi in Ninjago.

== Biography ==
Her father is the producer Tom McKillip, and her mother is the songwriter Lynda McKillip. She has an older sister, Carly McKillip, who is also an actress. Britt performed together with Carly in the country group One More Girl. Their debut album, Big Sky, was released in October 2009. The group released a new single "The Hard Way" in 2014.

== Filmography ==
=== Film ===
Year	Title	Role	Notes
2000	Mission to Mars	Child at Party	
2001	Barbie in the Nutcracker	Peppermint Girl	Voice role; direct-to-video
2002	Barbie as Rapunzel	Melody	Voice role; direct-to-video film
2003	Baby Looney Tunes: Eggs-traordinary Adventure	Baby Lola	Voice role; direct-to-video film
2005	Madeline in Tahiti	Nicole	Voice role
2005	Candy Land: The Great Lollipop Adventure	Princess Lolly	Voice role; direct-to-video film
2005	Barbie: Fairytopia	Pixie No. 1	Voice role; direct-to-video film
2005	Bob the Butler	Alex	
2006	My Little Pony: The Princess Promenade	Tra La La	Voice role; direct-to-video film
2006	My Little Pony: Greetings from Unicornia	Tra La La	Voice role; direct-to-video film
2006	My Little Pony Crystal Princess: The Runaway Rainbow	Tra La La	Voice role; direct-to-video film
2006	Bratz Babyz: the Movie	Cloe / Nita	Voice role; direct-to-video film
2006	Barbie in the 12 Dancing Princesses	Janessa	Voice role; direct-to-video film
2007	Barbie as the Island Princess	Rita	Voice role; direct-to-video film
2007	My Little Pony: A Very Pony Place	Tra La La	Voice role; direct-to-video film
2007	Trick 'r Treat	Macy	
2008	Ace of Hearts	Julia Harding	
2008	My Little Pony Live: The World's Biggest Tea Party	Tra La La	Voice role; direct-to-video film
2008	Bratz Babyz Save Christmas	Cloe	Voice role; direct-to-video film
2009	Dead Like Me: Life After Death	Reggie Lass	Direct-to-video film
2010	Strawberry Shortcake: The Berryfest Princess	Blueberry Muffin / Berrykin No. 4	Voice role; direct-to-video film
2010	Bratz: Pampered Petz	Cloe	Voice role; direct-to-video film
2012	Bratz: Desert Jewelz	Cloe	Voice role
2013	My Little Pony: Equestria Girls	Princess Cadance	Voice role
2013	Coming Home for Christmas	Melanie	Direct-to-video film
2015	My Little Pony: Equestria Girls – Friendship Games	Dean Cadance	Voice role
2017	My Little Pony: The Movie	Princess Cadance	Voice role
2018	Daddy's Girl	Jennifer	

=== Television ===
Year	Title	Role	Notes
1998	In the Doghouse	Sophie Wagner	Television film
1998	You, Me and the Kids	Lost girl at supermarket	Episode: "Street Smarts"
1998	Don't Look Down	Young Rachel	Television film
1998	Honey, I Shrunk the Kids: The TV Show	Little Mrs. McGann	Episode: "Honey, We're Young at Heart"
1998	The Outer Limits	Brook Bouton	Episode: "Mary 25"
1999	The Outer Limits	Sara Kohler	Episode: "The Grell"
2000	Ratz	Young Jennifer	Television film
2000	Special Delivery	Blair	Television film
2001	Night Visions	Kyra Martindelli	Episode: "Neighborhood Watch"
2001–2005	Dragon Tales	Goldilocks / Light-Yellow Dragon Scout	Recurring voice role
2002	Brother's Keeper	Young Lucinda / Marcie	Television film
2002	Breaking News	Meigan Sloan	Episode: "Pilot"
2002	Make Way for Noddy	Tessie Bear	US re-dub
2002	Sabrina: Friends Forever	Sabrina Spellman	Lead voice role; television film
2002–2005	Baby Looney Tunes	Baby Lola	Main voice role
2003	Scary Godmother: Halloween Spooktakular	Hannah Marie	Main voice role; television film
2003–2004	Sabrina's Secret Life	Sabrina Spellman	Lead voice role
2003–2004	Dead Like Me	Regina 'Reggie' Lass	Recurring role
2005	Scary Godmother: The Revenge of Jimmy	Hannah Marie	Voice role; television film
2005	FBI: Negotiator	Annie Moss	Television film
2005-2006	Firehouse Tales	Additional Voices	
2005	Trollz	Amethyst	Main voice role
2005–2006	Coconut Fred's Fruit Salad Island!	Bingo Cherry, Blueberry Kid, Baby	Main voice role
2006	Class of the Titans	Hope	Voice role; episode: "Little Box of Horrors"
2006	Holiday Wishes	Britney King	Television film
2006–2008	ToddWorld	Stella	Main voice role (season 2)
2007	Bratz: Super Babyz	Cloe	Voice role; video game
2008	Bratz	Cloe	Main voice role
2008	Desperate Hours: An Amber Alert	Katie	Television film
2009	Zixx	Amy	Voice role; 3 episodes
2010–2015	Strawberry Shortcake's Berry Bitty Adventures	Blueberry Muffin	Main voice role
2012	R.L. Stine's The Haunting Hour	Michelle	Episode: "Stage Fright"
2012–2019	My Little Pony: Friendship Is Magic	Princess Cadance / Peach Fuzz / Lyra Heartstrings / Cadance (Young)	Recurring voice role; 21 episodes
2016	Beat Bugs	Katter	Recurring voice role
2016–2017	Frequency	Young Meghan	Recurring role; 5 episodes
2017–2020	Super Monsters	Esmie	Main voice role
2018–2022	Ninjago	Princess Harumi	Main voice role
2018	Lego Jurassic World: The Secret Exhibit	Claire Dearing	Main voice role
2018	My Little Pony: Best Gift Ever	Princess Cadance	Voice role; television film
2018	Best Friend’s Betrayal	Anna	Television film
2019–2020	Lego Jurassic World: Legend of Isla Nublar	Claire Dearing / Park Worker #2 (1) / Kid #1 / Spa Worker	Main voice role
2021	My Little Pony: Pony Life	Princess Cadance	Episode: "What Goes Updo"
2024	Dead Dead Demon's Dededede Destruction	Oran Nakagawa	English dub
