= Coming Home for Christmas (film) =

- Film poster
- Written by: Kyle McGlohon; Bruce Spiegelman
- Directed by: Vanessa Parise
- Starring: Carly McKillip; Britt McKillip; Amy Jo Johnson; George Canyon
- Music by: Patric Caird
- Country of origin: Canada
- Original language: English

Production
- Running time: 87 minutes
- Production company: NGN

Original release
- Release: October 29, 2013

Coming Home For Christmas is a 2013 Canadian Christmas television film written by Kyle McGlohon and Bruce Spiegelman and directed by Vanessa Parise. It stars Ben Hollingsworth, Amy Jo Johnson, Carly McKillip and Britt McKillip.

== Plot ==
The story begins showing two sisters, Kate and Melanie (played by real life sisters Carly and Britt McKillip), growing up as very different girls in an otherwise close family. Their relationship is finally severed by Kate walking out on Melanie's wedding day due to her objection to the man that Melanie is marrying, whom Kate believes doesn't really care about her sister.

Five years later, Kate is jaded about family and romantic relationships but is working as an editor at a publishing house, which she considers her "dream job". Melanie is now alone in her house, pretending to friends and family that she is still living the life of a pampered wife. Their parents have had their house repossessed due to financial struggles and have moved into a townhouse where their mother, Wendy, helps make ends meet by hosting a preschool.

Wendy is especially hard hit when the bank sells their old home to a new owner, ending her wish that they may yet sufficiently recover to buy it back from the bank. Her depression leads to a separation from her husband.

Kate is driven by the separation of her parents to visit their old house where she is caught trespassing by the new owner, Mike, a handsome young war veteran who moved to the town to open up a woodworking shop. Wanting to reset their relationship, Kate visits the shop to see if Mike can repair her parents’ broken clock. She meets Ryan, the son of Mike's dead war buddy, whom Mike has taken under his wing as a helper in his shop.

Kate resolves to patch things up with her sister and enlist her in a plan to reunite their family to celebrate Christmas together for the first time since Kate walked out on Melanie's wedding.

The sisters rediscover their bond while Kate and Mike begin to form their own bond. Together, they all agree to set up a family Christmas celebration at Mike's house. They gather for Christmas at Mike's home for a nostalgic evening but persistent family issues spoil the celebration, including an accusation by Melanie that Mike is not really in love with Kate based on Melanie having overseen a tender moment with Mike and his old buddy's wife when she comes to pick up her son.

Kate, questioning her instincts about the inherent dysfunction of families, goes back to her sister to ask her forgiveness for walking out on her wedding. After they reconcile, Kate then goes to Mike for his side of the story, then asks his forgiveness for assuming the worst.

The family comes back together after Christmas to the old house to finish their celebration. Kate takes Mike outside to the mistletoe for their first kiss.

== Cast ==
- Ben Hollingsworth as Mike
- Amy Jo Johnson as Wendy
- Carly McKillip as Kate
- Britt McKillip as Melanie
- George Canyon as Al
- Jordan McIntosh as Ryan
