= Barbie: A Fairy Secret =

- DVD cover
- Directed by: William Lau
- Written by: Elise Allen
- Produced by: Tiffany J. Shuttleworth
- Starring: Diana Kaarina; Britt Irvin; Adrian Petriw; Cassandra Morris; Kate Higgins; Alexandra Carter; Brittney Wilson; Sergio Pollio
- Edited by: Sylvain Blais
- Music by: BC Smiths
- Production companies: Barbie Entertainment; Rainmaker Entertainment
- Distributed by: Universal Studios Home Entertainment; Kidtoon Films (limited theatrical)
- Release date: March 15, 2011 (DVD release)
- Running time: 72 minutes
- Country: United States
- Language: English

Barbie: A Fairy Secret is a 2011 animated fantasy film directed by William Lau and written by Elise Allen. Produced by Rainmaker Entertainment, it is the second film produced by Mattel Entertainment under the sales mark name of Barbie Entertainment. It was first released on DVD on March 15, 2011, and made its television premiere on Nickelodeon on April 17, 2011. The 19th entry in the Barbie film series, it features the voices of Diana Kaarina, who reprised her role as Barbie, and Adrian Petriw as Ken. The plot has a shared universe with Barbie: A Fashion Fairytale, where Barbie must team up with her frenemy Raquelle to save Ken from marrying a fairy princess and being trapped in a fairy world forever.

== Official description ==
"Get ready for Barbie A Fairy Secret, an amazing adventure with Barbie where she discovers there are fairies living secretly all around us! When Ken is suddenly whisked away by a group of fairies, Barbie's two fashion stylist friends reveal they are actually fairies and that Ken has been taken to a magical secret fairy world not far away! Barbie and her rival Raquelle take off with the fairy friends on an action-packed journey to bring him back. Along the way they must stick together and learn that the real magic lies not just in the fairy world itself, but in the power of friendship."

== Plot ==
Some time after the events of A Fashion Fairytale, Barbie is at the premiere of her latest movie along with her actor boyfriend Ken, when her rival and co-star, Raquelle, steps on her dress, ripping it. Her stylists, Carrie and Taylor, who are secretly fairies, use magic to mend it. Crystal, a photographer, greets Carrie and Taylor and, taking one last picture of Ken, leaves to go back to Gloss Angeles, a realm with fairies and winged creatures. Crystal shows Princess Graciella the pictures she took at the premiere. She gives the Princess some tea in which she secretly mixed with a love potion. Crystal then shows the Princess the picture of Ken she took, and Graciella falls in love with him almost instantly.

The next day at Wally's restaurant, Barbie confronts Raquelle about the dress-stepping incident. During the fracas, Princess Graciella, Crystal, and two assistant fairies unexpectedly show up and kidnap Ken. Carrie and Taylor sprout their wings and attempt to stop the Princess from taking Ken, but the portal to Gloss Angeles closes before they can enter it. The stylists attempt to dissuade Raquelle and Barbie of the fact that they just saw fairies, but finally admit their existence. They explain that Ken is in trouble because, if a human marries a fairy, the human has to stay in Gloss Angeles forever. Meanwhile, in Gloss Angeles, Ken and the Princess arrive in the royal palace, where they meet Zane, Graciella's boyfriend. Zane is outraged at Graciella's new love interest and challenges Ken to three consecutive duels.

Barbie, Raquelle, and the fairies go to a clothing store, where they enter a Fairy Flyway (a fairy method of transport), which leads them to the top of the Eiffel Tower in Paris. The fairies reveal that Lilianna Roxelle, a world-famous fashion critic, is the oldest and wisest fairy living on Earth. After they arrive at Lilianna's home, she informs them that Princess Graciella is under a love potion spell. She gives Barbie an antidote that will turn the Princess back to normal if it rains down on her. It is also revealed that Taylor and Carrie were banished from Gloss Angeles earlier due to some personal reasons. The girls then take Liliana's portal to continue their journey.

Barbie, Raquelle, Taylor, and Carrie make it to Gloss Angeles and they make a stop at Wings and Things in order to get fake wings for Barbie and Raquelle where they run into the human owner named Reena and her fairy husband Graylon. They then disguise themselves as cooks to try to reveal Princess Graciella about Crystal's love potion; however, Crystal reveals Taylor and Carrie by recognizing Taylor's shoes, and the princess locks the four in furyspheres. Barbie and Raquelle talk and finally figure out their misunderstanding. The reason Raquelle has always been so mean to Barbie is that she never got the chance to be Barbie's friend. They apologize to each other and become friends. Their reconciliation breaks the furyspheres and their wings become real, and they now realize that forgiveness lets them fly. The two then go to stop the wedding between Graciella and Ken, holding off the attendants and the princess. Finally, Barbie pours the antidote over Graciella, curing her of the love potion. Graciella realizes that it was Crystal who gave her the love potion and apologizes for the misunderstanding. She also explains that the reason she banished Taylor and Carrie is that the three of them were once friends but Taylor and Carrie started spending so much time together that she felt left out and betrayed. At the urging of Barbie and Raquelle, she lifts Taylor and Carrie's ban, and the three fairies forgive each other. Graciella then punishes Crystal by having her clean up after the ceremony and goes to marry Zane.

After the wedding, Graciella tells Barbie and Raquelle that their wings will disappear when they and Ken go back to the human world and then reappear when they return to Gloss Angeles. She also tells them that their memories of their adventures here will be erased since Raquelle cannot keep a secret. Graciella sends them back to Earth with magical dust. The next morning, Barbie wakes up with no recollection of Gloss Angeles or the fairies, thinking it was a dream. However, she and Raquelle are now friends. Back at Wally's, Carrie and Taylor tell the two and Ken that they reconnected with an old friend (Princess Graciella) and are going back to their hometown (Gloss Angeles). In the last scene, Carrie and Taylor turn into fairies out of sight, and fly back through the portal.

== Cast ==
- Diana Kaarina as Barbie
- Adrian Petriw as Ken
- Britt Irvin as Raquelle
- Cassandra Morris as Carrie, a purse fairy stylist who wears purple
- Kate Higgins as Taylor, a British shoe fairy stylist who wears pink
- Alexandra Carter as Princess Graciella, the princess of Gloss Angeles
- Brittney Wilson as Crystal, the lovesick villain who hypnotized Graciella
- Silvio Pollio as Zane, Graciella's violent Italian husband
- Nicole Oliver as Liliana Roxelle, a French fairy fashion designer who appeared in Fashion Fairytale
- Laura Bailey as Additional Voices

== See also ==
- List of Barbie films
