= One More Girl =

Canadian country music duo

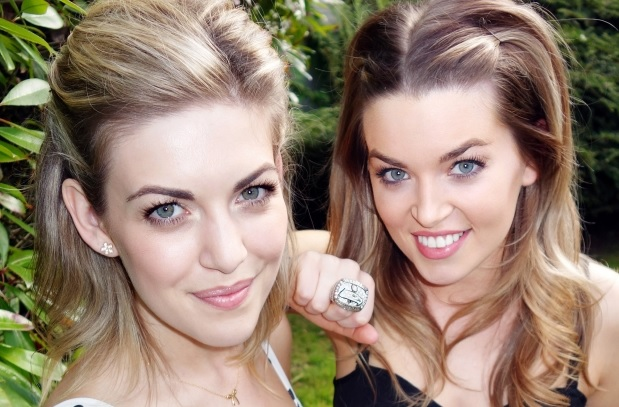
- One More Girl in 2014

Background information
- Also known as: Saving Grace
- Origin: Maple Ridge, British Columbia Canada
- Genres: Country
- Years active: 2008–2015
- Labels: EMI Music Canada, Interscope, Open Road Recordings
- Members: Britt McKillip; Carly McKillip
- Website: onemoregirlmusic.com

One More Girl was a Canadian country music duo composed of actress-singers Carly and Britt McKillip, who are sisters. The duo signed to EMI Canada in 2008 and released their debut album, Big Sky, in 2009. In 2010, they won the Rising Star award at the Canadian Country Music Association Awards. In August 2011, the duo signed with American pop music label Interscope Records.

== History ==
In December 2008, One More Girl signed with EMI Music Canada and released their debut single, "I Can Love Anyone", to Canadian country radio shortly after. EMI released the duo's debut album, Big Sky, on October 6, 2009. Another single for EMI, "Fall Like That", was released in early 2011 as the first single from the duo's second album.

In August 2011, the duo signed with Interscope Records, an American pop music label.

The duo released an extended play, The Hard Way, in February 2014 via Open Road Recordings.

Both sisters are also actresses, with Carly known for her role in the series Alice, I Think, while Britt is known for co-starring in the US cable television series Dead Like Me and also providing the voice of Princess Cadance for My Little Pony: Friendship Is Magic. By 2023, the group had already disbanded.

== Discography ==
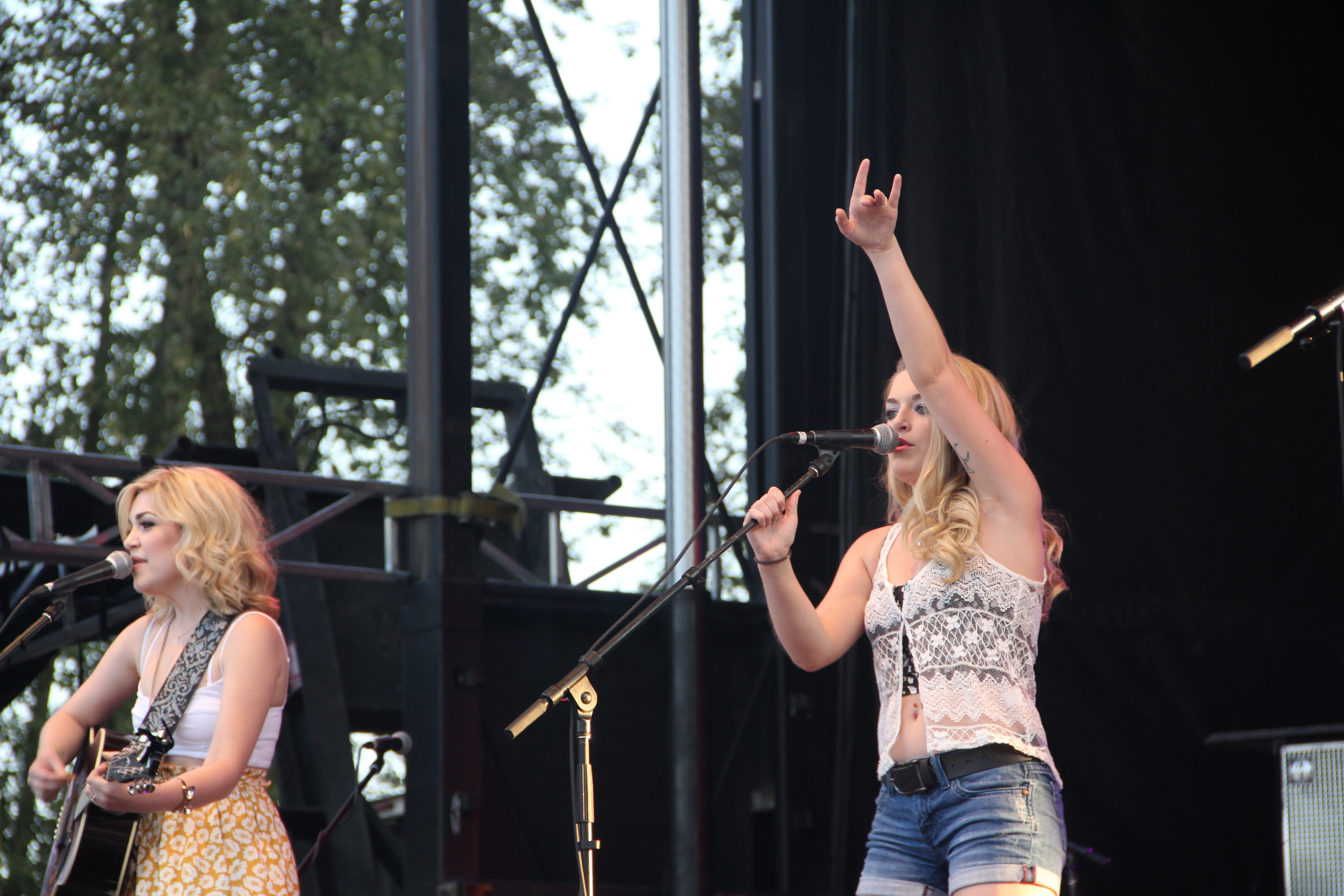
One More Girl performing in 2012

=== Albums ===
Title	Details
Big Sky	Release date: October 6, 2009; Label: EMI Music Canada

=== Extended plays ===
Title	Details
One More Girl for Christmas	Release date: November 22, 2013; Label: One More Girl Music
The Hard Way	Release date: February 4, 2014; Label: Open Road Recordings

=== Singles ===
Year	Single	Peak positions		Album
Year	Single	CAN Country	CAN	Album
2008	"I Can Love Anyone"	18	—	Big Sky
2009	"Misery Loves Company"	30	—	Big Sky
2009	"When It Ain't Rainin'"	7	86	Big Sky
2009	"Tumblin' Tears"	10	—	Big Sky
2010	"The Day I Fall"	27	—	Big Sky
2011	"Fall Like That"	31	—	—N/a
2012	"Maybe"	18	—	—N/a
2013	"Run Run Run"	36	—	—N/a
2013	"Love Like Mine"	26	—	The Hard Way (EP)
2014	"Drunk Heart"	38	—	The Hard Way (EP)
"—" denotes releases that did not chart

=== Music videos ===
Year	Video	Director
2008	"I Can Love Anyone"	Kathi Prosser
2009	"Misery Loves Company"	Margaret Malandruccolo
2009	"When It Ain't Rainin'"	Margaret Malandruccolo
2010	"Tumblin' Tears"	Margaret Malandruccolo
2010	"The Day I Fall"	Margaret Malandruccolo
2012	"Maybe"	Margaret Malandruccolo
2013	"Run Run Run"	Margaret Malandruccolo
2013	"Love Like Mine"	Wes Mack
2013	"Home for Christmas" (with George Canyon, Aaron Pritchett and Jordan McIntosh)	Stephen Lubig
2014	"Drunk Heart"	

== Awards and nominations ==
=== Canadian Country Music Association Awards ===
Year	Category	Result
2010	Group or Duo of the Year	Nominated
2010	Rising Star	Won

=== Other awards ===
- 2005–2007 British Columbia Country Music Association "Group of the Year"- 3 Nominations
- 2009 British Columbia Country Music Association "Horizon Award"
- 2010 Canadian Radio Music "Best New Country Artist"
- 2010 British Columbia Country Music Association "Single of the Year", "Group or Duo", "Album of the Year", "Entertainer of the Year"
