= Carly McKillip =

Canadian actress (born 1989)

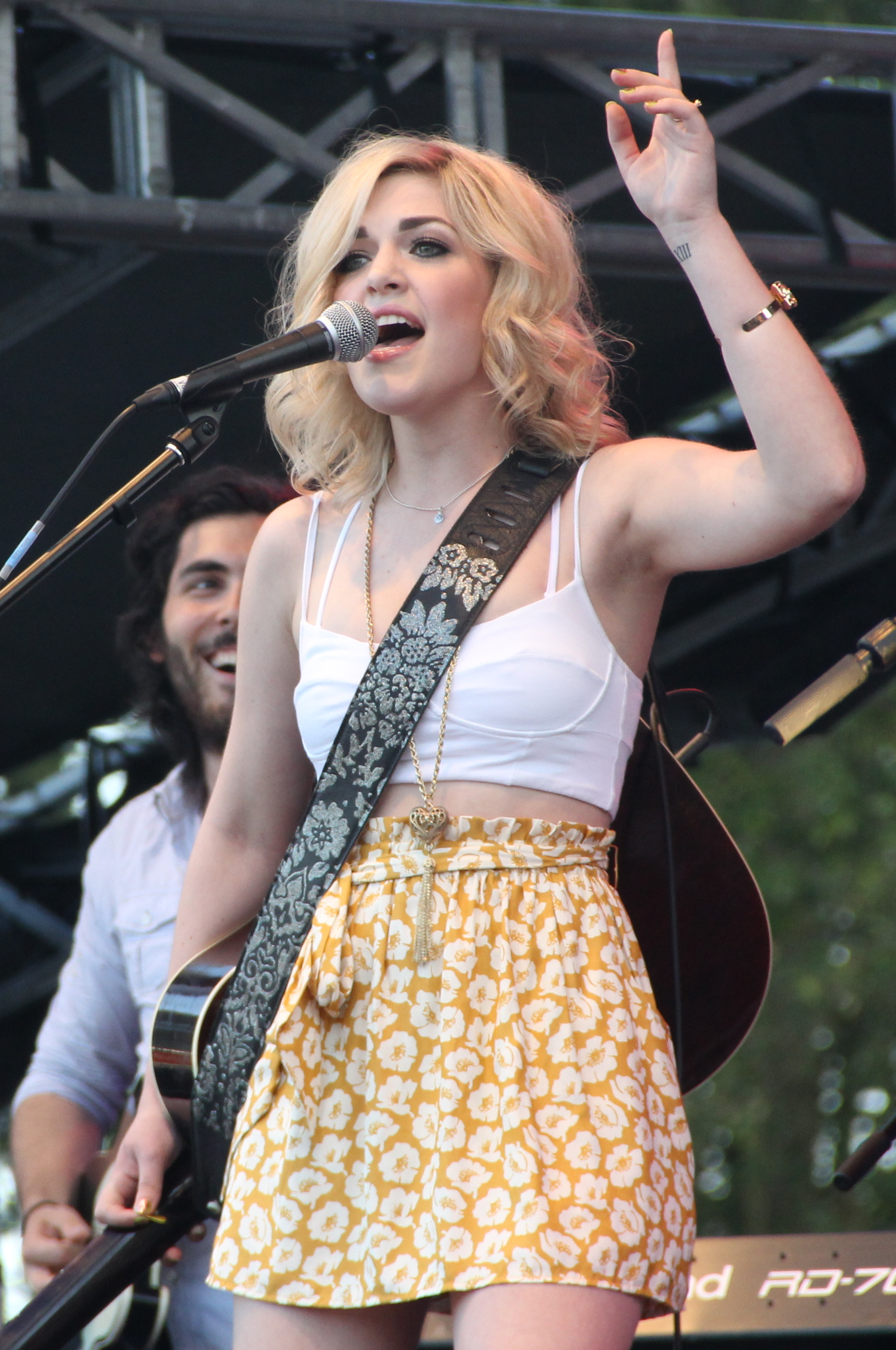
- McKillip performing with One More Girl in 2012
- Born: Carly Maria McKillip; February 13, 1989 (age 37); Vancouver, British Columbia, Canada
- Occupations: Actress; singer
- Years active: 1995–present
- Spouse: Darren Savard (m. 2015)
- Children: 3
- Relatives: Britt McKillip (sister)

Carly Maria McKillip (born February 13, 1989) is a Canadian actress and singer. She is known for her title role in the television series Alice, I Think. She also provided the voice of Sakura Avalon, the title character of the Nelvana-dubbed anime television series Cardcaptors. She was occasionally miscredited as Carly McKillup.

== Biography ==
McKillip was born in Vancouver, British Columbia. Her father, Tom McKillip, is a record producer, and her mother, Lynda McKillip, is a songwriter. She has a younger sister named Britt McKillip, who is also an actress. She married Darren Savard, lead guitarist for Dallas Smith, on May 9, 2015. They have a son born on June 29, 2019. Their second son was born a few years later.

McKillip played the title role in Alice, I Think, a Canadian television series that aired 2006 on The Comedy Network and CTV. She is also the former lead vocalist in the Vancouver band Borderline, and performed together with her sister Britt in the country group One More Girl. Their debut album, Big Sky, was released in October 2009. In addition to this, the country duo came out with a new single called "The Hard Way" in 2014.

== Filmography ==
=== Film ===
Year	Title	Role	Notes
1999	Cardcaptors: The Movie	Sakura Avalon (voice)	English dub
2001	Saving Silverman	Cute Girl	
2007	Hot Rod	Highschool Girl	
2007	Barbie as the Island Princess	Gina (voice)	Direct-to-video
2008	Bratz Girlz Really Rock	Anna (voice)	
2010	Triple Dog	Nina	

=== Television ===
Year	Title	Role	Notes
1995	The Marshal	Molly MacBride	15 episodes
1996	She Woke Up Pregnant	Jessica	Television film
1996	The Limbic Region	Jennifer Lucca - Age 5 Years	Television film
1996	For Hope	Laura Altman	Television film
1996	The X-Files	Caitlin Ross	Episode: "Paper Hearts"
1997	Jitters	Kristen	Television film
1998	The Hunted	Little Girl	Television film
1998	Floating Away	Singing Girl	Television film
1998	Stranger in Town	Kim	Television film
1998	Don't Look Down	Young Carla	Television film
2000–01	Cardcaptors	Sakura Avalon (voice)	English dub
2000–02	What About Mimi?	Sincerity Travers (voice)	40 episodes
2002	Sabrina: Friends Forever	Portia (voice)	Television film
2004	Jack	Jenny	Television film
2005	School of Life	Devon	Television film
2007, 2010	Cyberchase	PJ's assistant, Additional Voices (voices)	Episodes: "When Penguins Fly" and "Faceoff"
2007	Bionic Woman	Vivian	Episode: "Paradise Lost"
2013	Coming Home for Christmas	Kate O'Brien	Television film

== Discography ==
=== Music videos ===
Year	Video
2013	"Duet" (with Wes Mack)

== Awards and nominations ==
Year	Association	Category	Result
2014	Canadian Country Music Association	CMT Video of the Year – "Duet"	Nominated
2014	Canadian Country Music Association	All Star Band – Keyboards	Nominated
