= Edge of the Storm =

Studio album by Wes Mack
- Released: September 4, 2015
- Genre: Country
- Length: 40:41
- Label: Universal Music Canada

Wes Mack chronology
Wes Mack (2015)	Edge of the Storm (2015)	Soul (2019)

Singles from Edge of the Storm
- 1. "Duet" Released: June 17, 2013; 2. "Our Soundtrack" Released: November 7, 2013; 3. "Before You Drive Me Crazy" Released: January 6, 2015; 4. "The Way You Let Me Down" Released: May 2015; 5. "I Lost Count" Released: October 2015; 6. "Listen to Me" Released: May 24, 2016

Edge of the Storm is the debut album by Canadian country music artist Wes Mack. It was released on September 4, 2015, via Universal Music Canada. It includes the top 20 singles "Duet", "Our Soundtrack", "Before You Drive Me Crazy" and "The Way You Let Me Down".

== Track listing ==
No.	Title	Writer(s)	Length
1.	"Before You Drive Me Crazy"	Rick Ferrell, Wesley MacInnes, Micah Wilshire	3:09
2.	"Duet" (featuring Carly McKillip)	Jeffrey Johnson, MacInnes	3:14
3.	"The Way You Let Me Down"	Todd Clark, Gavin Slate, Donovan Woods	3:18
4.	"Listen to Me"	MacInnes, Jason Massey, Matt Rogers	3:21
5.	"Edge of the Storm"	MacInnes, Bruce Wallace	3:33
6.	"Broke"	MacInnes, Massey, Wallace	3:16
7.	"I Lost Count"	Nathan Champan, Adam Hambrick, Jeremy Stover	3:05
8.	"Heart Back Home"	Johnson, MacInnes	4:01
9.	"Fairground Friday Night"	Johnson, MacInnes, Jordan Oorebeek	3:21
10.	"Our Soundtrack"	Adam Craig, Bob Regan, Rogers	3:16
11.	"Free Fall"	MacInnes, Carly McKillip, Lynda McKillip	3:55
12.	"No Lookin' Back"	MacInnes, Deric Ruttan, Jonathan Singleton	3:12
Total length:			40:41

== Chart performance ==
=== Singles ===
Year	Single	Peak chart positions	
Year	Single	CAN Country	CAN
2013	"Duet"	9	89
2013	"Our Soundtrack"	20	—
2015	"Before You Drive Me Crazy"	6	98
2015	"The Way You Let Me Down"	12	100
2015	"I Lost Count"	29	—
2016	"Listen to Me"		
"—" denotes releases that did not chart
