= Heather Longstaffe =

- Occupation(s): Singer, songwriter
- Instrument(s): Vocals, singer-songwriter, guitar

Heather Longstaffe is a Canadian singer-songwriter from Winnipeg, Manitoba, currently based in Los Angeles, California.

In 2011 she won the Radio Star National Songwriting Competition and signed with EMI Music Publishing. Heather Longstaffe performed at the Canadian Country Music Association Songwriters' Series in 2012 and 2014.

After years writing songs for artists such as Jordan McIntosh, and Madeline Merlo. 2015 saw Longstaffe release music under her own name with TTA Music, and "Slingshot" was subsequently nominated for a Manitoba Country Music Association Award. After performing with Dallas Smith and touring with Emerson Drive, her songs "Jack Daniels" and "Rooftops" broke through on Canadian radio and SiriusXM, repeatedly winning listener opinion polls.

Longstaffe has been a volunteer with Musicians On Call, bringing live music to the bedsides of patients in healthcare facilities.
