= Barbie as the Island Princess =

2007 animated film

- DVD cover
- Directed by: Greg Richardson
- Written by: Elana Lesser; Cliff Ruby
- Produced by: Jesyca C. Durchin; Jennifer Twinner McCaron; Shea Wageman
- Starring: Kelly Sheridan; Christopher Gaze; Susan Roman; Brian Drummond; Steve Marvel; Alessandro Juliani; Andrea Martin
- Edited by: Colin Adams
- Music by: Arnie Roth; Megan Cavallari
- Production companies: Mattel Entertainment; Rainmaker Animation
- Distributed by: Universal Studios Home Entertainment (Note: Released under Entertainment Rights/Classic Media outside North America, with Right Entertainment distributing in the United Kingdom)
- Release date: September 18, 2007
- Running time: 85 minutes
- Countries: Canada; United States
- Language: English

Barbie as the Island Princess is a 2007 CGI-animated musical film and the eleventh installment in the film series based on Mattel's Barbie toyline. The only entry animated by Mainframe Studios as Rainmaker Animation, the film stars the voice of Kelly Sheridan.

The score was composed by Arnie Roth, with songs written by Megan Cavallari, Amy Powers, and executive producer Rob Hudnut. It was released direct-to-DVD on September 18, 2007, with a television premiere five days later on Nickelodeon.

== Plot ==
Sagi, a red panda, and Azul, an Indian peacock, live on a tropical island in the South Seas. One day, they discover a young girl washed up on shore after a storm and take her in. A chest among the debris washed up with her has the letters "R-O" on its broken nameplate; the animals name the girl Ro, and she grows up playing with them and the Asian elephant Tika. However, she has no memory of her past aside from a lullaby she heard when she was an infant.

Ten years later, Prince Antonio of Apollonia is out exploring the South Seas, and finds himself on Ro's island. Ro, now a young woman able to communicate with animals, saves him from crocodiles. Antonio invites her to come to Apollonia so she can research her past. Ro agrees, bringing her animal friends with her. During the journey, Ro and Antonio begin to fall in love.

Antonio's parents, Peter and Danielle, are shocked by Ro's arrival. While Antonio had been away, Peter arranged a marriage for him to force him to settle down and stop adventuring. Peter immediately dislikes Ro for disrupting his plans; however, Antonio's sisters Rita, Sofia, and Gina, and Danielle's rhesus monkey Tallulah befriend Ro.

Antonio's betrothed, Princess Luciana, arrives in Apollonia with her mother Ariana so that Antonio can meet them. Unbeknownst to everyone present, Ariana is secretly the daughter of nobles whom Peter demoted to be swineherds after they committed treason. Ariana had moved abroad, married an elderly king to become queen, and has returned to enact revenge. Sensing that Ro may be a threat, she sabotages Ro's attempts to fit in; however, Antonio only falls deeper in love with Ro, and Luciana comes to feel sorry for her.

Ro, demoralized by her failures, considers returning to her island. The animals cheer her up and help her get dressed for the royal engagement ball. At the ball, everyone is impressed by Ro's beauty and grace, and Antonio privately proposes to her. Ro declines, unwilling to defy Peter. Later, Sagi spots a carriage flying a flag resembling a banner that washed ashore with Ro; the carriage horse reveals the flag is that of the kingdom of Paladia.

Antonio argues with Peter and abdicates the throne to Rita. He leaves a note for Ro, saying he will run away with her. Tika overhears and hides the note, fearing she may lose Ro. Meanwhile, Ariana sends her pet rats to spread a poisonous herb that causes all animals who ingest it to fall into a coma, including Tallulah and Azul. Peter imprisons Ro and her animals, believing they brought the "disease" to Apollonia.

Peter strikes a bargain with Antonio – Ro and the animals will be freed if Antonio marries Luciana. Antonio reluctantly agrees. Shortly after, Ro and her animals are sent away on a ship. Tika realizes her mistake and apologizes for hiding the note, and Ro forgives her. A sailor in Ariana's pay knocks them all overboard; falling into the sea causes Ro to remember her full name, Rosella.

Returning to Apollonia with the aid of a pod of dolphins, Ro learns from a bird that Ariana had put the herb in the wedding cake to kill Peter and Antonio. Ro makes an antidote for the sunset herb, but is stopped by guards. Tika disrupts the wedding and gets Antonio to rescue Ro, while Sagi takes the antidote to Tallulah, waking her. Ro accuses Ariana to a skeptical Peter, and Luciana backs her up, revealing that her mother had forbidden her to eat the wedding cake because it was "bad luck". Ariana attempts to flee in a carriage, but is flung into a pigsty.

Antonio proposes to Ro, who is welcomed into the family. When Ro reveals her full name, one of the wedding guests, Queen Marissa of Paladia, comes forward and says that her daughter, Princess Rosella, had gone overboard in a shipwreck many years ago. Ro's memory returns as she and Marissa sing the lullaby from her childhood together, proving they are related. Ro and Antonio are married, and sail off with Tika, Sagi, Azul, and Tallulah in tow.

== Cast ==
Cast as per the closing credits:

- Kelly Sheridan as "Ro"/Princess Rosella of Paladia, Queen Marissa's long-lost daughter (played by Barbie)
  - Melissa Lyons as Singing Voice of Ro
- Alessandro Juliani as Prince Antonio of Apollonia (played by Ken), Luciana's betrothed.
- Christopher Gaze as Sagi, a wise and kindly red panda who takes Ro in after the wreck and acts as a father figure.
- Steve Marvel as
  - Azul, a flamboyant and self-important Indian peacock.
  - Minister
- Susan Roman as Tika, a young Asian elephant who looks up to Ro as an older sister, and is jealous of Antonio.
- Garry Chalk as
  - Frazer, Antonio's traveling companion/friend/manservant.
  - Calvin
- Russell Roberts as King Peter, Antonio's father and Danielle's husband, who disapproves of his son's adventuring.
- Patricia Drake as
  - Queen Danielle, Antonio's mother, Peter's wife, and the doting owner of Tallulah.
  - The Mama Pig
- Bets Malone as Tallulah, Queen Danielle's friendly but somewhat spoiled rhesus monkey who was orphaned on a South Seas island, and discovered and brought back as a pet for Antonio's mother.
- Britt McKillip as Princess Rita (played by Chelsie), Antonio's little sister.
- Carly McKillip as Princess Gina (played by Becky), Antonio's other little sister.
- Chantal Strand as Princess Sofia (played by Kelly), Antonio's other little sister.
- Andrea Martin as Queen Ariana, a woman who plots to get her revenge on King Peter by having her daughter, Luciana, marry Prince Antonio.
- Candice Nicole as Princess Luciana (played by Summer), Arianna's kindhearted and friendly daughter, and Antonio's betrothed.
- Kate Fisher as Queen Marissa of Paladia, Ro's long-lost mother.
- Brian Drummond as Lorenzo, the vet.
- Terry Klassen as
  - Butler
  - Guard
  - Horse
- David Kaye as Guard
- Kathleen Barr as Tiny, a bluebird.
- Scott Page-Pagter as Nat, one of Ariana's pet rats.
- Ian James Corlett as Pat, one of Ariana's pet rats.

As a gag credit, Matt, the mime rat, is credited as being voiced by himself.

== Songs ==
The songs are written by Megan Cavallari and Amy Powers, with executive producer Rob Hudnut.

1. "Here on My Island" – Melissa Lyons, Steve Marvel, Christopher Gaze and Susan Roman
2. "Right Here in My Arms" – Melissa Lyons
3. "A Brand New Shore" – Alessandro Juliani, Susan Roman, Christopher Gaze, Steve Marvel and Melissa Lyons
4. "I Need to Know" – Melissa Lyons and Alessandro Juliani
5. "Love Is for Peasants" – Andrea Martin and Candice Nicole
6. "Right Here in My Arms" (Greenhouse) – Melissa Lyons
7. "At the Ball" – Bets Malone, Christopher Gaze, Melissa Lyons, Susan Roman and Steve Marvel
8. "The Rat Song" – Martin, Scott Page-Pagter and Ian James Corlett
9. "Always More" – Melissa Lyons
10. "Right Here in My Arms" (Reunion) – Melissa Lyons and Kate Fisher
11. "When We Have Love" – Candice Nicole, Kate Fisher, Bets Malone, Steve Marvel, Susan Roman, Christopher Gaze, Melissa Lyons and Alessandro Juliani
12. "I Need to Know" (pop version) – Cassidy Ladden

== Reception ==
Paul Mavis of DVD Talk wrote, "Barbie as The Island Princess is a well-executed CGI-animated fantasy with a sweet, tender, believable approach to its love story that will no doubt make little girls sigh with delight." Catherine Dawson March of The Globe and Mail called the film "enchanting" and considered its songs to be "on par with Barbie as the Princess and the Pauper".

Common Sense Media's Nancy Davis Kho wrote of the film, "parents can rest assured that the subject matter is entertaining and kid-appropriate, and put their energies toward worrying about all the commercialism surrounding it." Kho praised the animation and "lush original score", and wrote that Ro and Luciana are positive role models.

== Video game ==
Barbie as the Island Princess
- Barbie as the Island Princess cover art (North American Wii version)
- Developer: Ivolgamus
- Publisher: Activision
- Director: Greg Richardson
- Platforms: PlayStation 2, Microsoft Windows, Wii, Nintendo DS, Game Boy Advance
- Release: NA: October 30, 2007; EU: December 7, 2007; AU: December 19, 2007
- Genre: Platform
- Modes: Single-player; Multiplayer

Barbie as the Island Princess is a 2007 platform video game based on the movie for PlayStation 2, Microsoft Windows, Wii, Nintendo DS, and Game Boy Advance. Developed by Lithuanian video game company Ivolgamus and published by Activision, most of the versions were a collection of 28 different mini-games. The Nintendo DS version featured only 12 minigames, which IGN's Lucas Thomas noted was far too short of an experience and could be completed "within a couple of car rides."

== See also ==
- List of Barbie films
