= Cardcaptor Sakura =

Japanese manga series by Clamp

- The first volume of Cardcaptor Sakura featuring Sakura Kinomoto

カードキャプターさくら (Kādokyaputā Sakura)
- Genre: Magical girl; Romance
- Manga
- Written by: Clamp
- Published by: Kodansha
- English publisher: AUS: Madman Entertainment; JP: Kodansha (bilingual); NA: Kodansha Comics
- Magazine: Nakayoshi
- Original run: June 1996 – August 2000
- Volumes: 12
- Anime television series
- Directed by: Morio Asaka
- Produced by: Eizo Kondo
- Written by: Nanase Ohkawa
- Music by: Takayuki Negishi
- Studio: Madhouse
- Licensed by: AUS: Madman Entertainment; BI: Anime Limited; CA: Nelvana; NA: NIS America; SEA: Medialink
- Original network: NHK BS2
- English network: AU: Network Ten, Toonami; CA: Teletoon; IE: RTÉ2; SEA: Animax Asia; UK: Nickelodeon, Nicktoons, CITV, Channel 4; US: Kids' WB, Cartoon Network (Toonami)
- Original run: April 7, 1998 – March 21, 2000
- Episodes: 70
- Other
- Cardcaptor Sakura: The Movie; Cardcaptor Sakura Movie 2: The Sealed Card; Cardcaptor Sakura: Clear Card
- icon

Cardcaptor Sakura (Japanese: カードキャプターさくら, Hepburn: Kādokyaputā Sakura), abbreviated as CCS, is a Japanese manga series written and illustrated by the manga group Clamp. Serialized monthly in the shōjo manga magazine Nakayoshi from the June 1996 to August 2000 issues, it was also published in 12 tankōbon volumes by Kodansha between November 1996 and July 2000. The story centers on Sakura Kinomoto, an elementary school student who discovers magical powers after accidentally freeing a set of magical cards into the world; she must retrieve the cards to prevent catastrophe. Each of these cards grants different magical powers, and can only be activated by someone with inherent magical abilities. A sequel by Clamp, Cardcaptor Sakura: Clear Card, focusing on Sakura in junior high school, was serialized in Nakayoshi from the July 2016 to January 2024 issues.

The manga was adapted into a 70-episode anime television series by Madhouse that aired on Japan's satellite television channel NHK BS2 from April 1998 to March 2000. Additional media include two anime films, video games, art books, picture books, and film comics. Tokyopop released the manga in English in North America from March 2000 to August 2003. After Tokyopop's license expired, Dark Horse Manga released the series in omnibus editions from October 2010 to September 2012. The anime was dubbed in English by Hong Kong's Omni Productions, and was aired in Southeast Asia and South Asia on the channel Animax Asia.

Nelvana licensed the TV series and first film for North America under the English title Cardcaptors, which first aired on Kids' WB from June 2000 to December 2001. All 70 episodes were dubbed; while other English-speaking territories received the full run, the version aired on American television was heavily edited into 39 episodes. Cardcaptors also aired on Cartoon Network (Toonami), Teletoon, Nickelodeon, Network Ten, and RTÉ2. The TV series and films were sub-licensed by Geneon, which released them unedited with English subtitles. The TV series was also released by Madman Entertainment in Australia and New Zealand.

Cardcaptor Sakura was critically well received. Critics praised the manga for its creativity and described it as a quintessential shōjo manga, as well as a critical work for manga in general. The manga series was awarded the Seiun Award for Best Manga in 2001. The television series was praised for transcending its target audience of young children and being enjoyable to older viewers, and for its artwork, humor, characterization, and animation; it won the Animage Grand Prix award for Best Anime in 1999. The American edit of Cardcaptors, however, was criticized for removing elements essential to the plot.

== Plot ==
Cardcaptor Sakura takes place in the fictional town of Tomoeda, which is located somewhere near the Japanese capital of Tokyo. Ten-year-old Sakura Kinomoto accidentally releases a set of magical cards known as Clow Cards from a book in her basement created by and named after the sorcerer Clow Reed. Each card has its own unique ability and can assume an alternate form when activated. The guardian of the cards, Cerberus (nicknamed Kero), emerges from the book and explains that only a person with magical powers could open the seal of the book, revealing to Sakura that she can do magic. Kero chooses Sakura to retrieve the missing cards. As she finds each card, she battles its magical personification and defeats it by sealing it away. Cerberus acts as her guide, while her best friend and second cousin, Tomoyo Daidouji, films her exploits and provides her with both battle costumes and moral support. Sakura's older brother Toya Kinomoto watches over her, while pretending that he is unaware of what is going on.

Syaoran Li, a boy of Sakura's age and an indirect descendent of Clow Reed, arrives from Hong Kong to recapture the cards himself. While initially antagonistic, he comes to respect Sakura and begins aiding her in capturing the cards. Once Sakura captures all of the cards, she is tested by Yue, the cards' second guardian, to determine if she is worthy of becoming the cards' true master; Yue is also the true form of Yukito Tsukishiro, Toya's best friend whom Sakura has a crush on. Aided by her school teacher Kaho Mizuki, Sakura passes the test and becomes the new master of the Clow Cards.

Afterwards, Eriol Hiiragizawa, a transfer student from England and later confirmed as the reincarnation of Clow Reed (albeit one who holds only Clow Reed's memories and is not the sorcerer himself), arrives in Tomoeda and begins causing disturbances with two guardian-like creatures, Spinel Sun and Ruby Moon; the latter of whom takes on a human persona (Nakuru) and goes to the same school as Sakura's brother Toya. While under the guise of a female student Ruby Moon develops a strong crush on Toya while seeing Yukito as a love rival. At some point Yukito reveals to Sakura that he loves Toya, who later reveals indirectly to Yukito (while recovering after giving his magic to Yue to save both their lives) that he loves him in return. Sakura finds herself suddenly unable to use the Clow Cards and transforms her wand, beginning the process of evolving the cards into Sakura Cards as Eriol causes strange occurrences that forces her to use and thus transform certain cards. Once all the cards have been transformed, Eriol tells Sakura that he aided her in converting the cards so they would not lose their magic powers, while Spinel reveals to Sakura that Eriol stopped himself from ageing long ago so that he could go to class and befriend and help her. Syaoran later confesses his love to Sakura, who comes to realize she also loves him. Sakura reveals to Syaoran that she loves him back; telling him that he is her "Number One" (the person she loves the most). Syaoran reluctantly returns to Hong Kong but now knowing that Sakura loves him the same way he promises her that he will come back when he's finished with some business he needs to attend to there. He desperately asks Sakura if she will wait for him, and vows that she will. Over the next two years, Sakura and Syaoran maintain a long-distance relationship; making phone calls and writing letters to each other. On Sakura's first day of middle school, Syaoran moves back to Tomoeda permanently, and happily reunites with Sakura.

The plot of the anime series is extended, featuring 52 Clow Cards from the manga's original 19, and certain scenes are stretched and delayed, such as Cerberus' true form not being revealed until just before Yue's appearance. Sakura creates a 53rd card, Hope, a talent she is not shown to have in the manga. Some of the circumstances around the capturing of the cards is changed, such as Syaoran capturing several cards himself and being tested by Yue in the Final Judgment. Syaoran's cousin and fiancée Meiling Li is introduced in the anime, who positions herself as a jealous and romantic rival for Sakura and later becomes a friend until she returns to Hong Kong. The television series leaves the relationship between Sakura and Syaoran unresolved, but Sakura confesses her love to Syaoran at the end of the second anime film.

== Production ==
Cardcaptor Sakura was first conceived shortly before the conclusion of Clamp's Magic Knight Rayearth, which was serialized in Nakayoshi. Clamp's head editor Yamonouchi asked them to do another series in Nakayoshi, and Clamp decided to make a "Nakayoshi-esque" series, as opposed to Rayearth, which Clamp described as unlike anything they had done before. Head Clamp writer Nanase Ohkawa's first impulse was to create a magical girl series, despite not being well-versed in the genre. Ohkawa wanted the heroine Sakura to be in the same age group as the majority of Nakayoshi's readers so that fans could relate to her. Due to it being different from how Clamp normally conceived characters, Ohkawa designed the other characters such as Tomoyo and Cerberus to be more like Clamp's previous creations. Once Ohkawa had enough information on the characters, she had the three artists in Clamp—Mokona, Tsubaki Nekoi and Satsuki Igarashi—design them based on her descriptions. When designing Cerberus, Ohkawa wanted a mascot-type companion for Sakura, but Nekoi tried various forms, including dogs and squirrels, before designing the final version. Syaoran and Toya were conceived to be a common type of character featured in Clamp's works.

Various other titles were suggested for the series such as Cardcaster Sakura and Card Character Sakura before Nekoi suggested Cardcaptor Sakura. While Ohkawa planned out Cardcaptor Sakura from beginning to end, she never consulted the plot with the other members, instead giving them the script one chapter at a time. Mokona initially drew Tomoyo so it would look like she was in love with Toya, which led to her surprise when she received the script for the chapter which reveals Tomoyo loves Sakura. The story was planned to have the theme of "if you try your best, it'll work out", but Ohkawa did not start out with Sakura's "It'll definitely be okay" mindset. Ohkawa addressed the relationships featured in the series by using Tomoyo and Sakura as an example. She explained that the reason Tomoyo and Sakura did not end up together was because Sakura did not love Tomoyo in a romantic way.

The central theme of Cardcaptor Sakura is love and human relationships. Throughout the series, many forms of love are showcased, including "sibling love, childhood crushes, unrequited love, [and] true love." At times, Clamp even ignores the Clow Cards for several chapters to focus more on the relationships of Sakura and those around her. Each of these relationships are presented nonjudgmentally and without commentary on the correctness of the relationships. In particular, the romantic relationship between elementary student Rika Sasaki and her teacher Yoshiyuki Terada is presented in such a way that it can be seen as a sweet and innocent tale of "wish fulfillment", or if examined more seriously, as a mildly disturbing story of pedophilic love.

The artists, especially Mokona, were told by Ohkawa to use thin lines and to try to express things through curved lines as opposed to straight lines. The style of artwork was decided at the beginning to unify the world view of Cardcaptor Sakura. Ohkawa wanted the series to have a "soft, cute-like" feel, so she asked the artists to not use a lot of ink and to make the pages light. For the multitude of flower imagery used in the manga, Nekoi looked through various books to find appropriate flowers, and tried to avoid using the same flower more than once in one chapter. Igarashi remarked that they "never had to draw so many flowers for one series," but they made a point to not use roses. Clamp wanted to incorporate transformation scenes into Cardcaptor Sakura, but because many magical girl manga have the girls wearing the same outfit, they wanted Sakura to wear different costumes. They felt that "it's pretty sad for a girl to wear the same outfit all the time."

== Media ==
=== Manga ===
Logo of the Cardcaptor Sakura manga series

Cardcaptor Sakura began as a manga series written and illustrated by the manga artist group Clamp. It was serialized in the monthly shōjo (aimed at young girls) manga magazine Nakayoshi from the June 1996 to August 2000 issues. The individual chapters were collected and published in 12 tankōbon volumes by Kodansha from November 1996 to July 2000. Kodansha released the first six volumes in bilingual editions that included both Japanese and English from May 2000 to July 2001. The bilingual volumes were part of an experimental line for helping Japanese children learn English. Kodansha stopped releasing the bilingual editions after the series was licensed in English for distribution in North America by Tokyopop.

In addition to the regular 50 chapters of the manga series, Clamp also wrote and drew two special chapters that were released in Japan as part of two volumes of a collection of artbooks titled Cardcaptor Sakura: Illustrated Collection. The first special chapter, which was published in the first volume, focuses on Toya and Sakura's relationship, with Toya caring for her while she has a cold. The second special chapter, which focuses on Sakura's (at that time unrealized) love for Syaoran, has a similar premise, but with Syaoran catching a cold and Sakura caring for him while he is unwell.

Tokyopop released the volumes of Cardcaptor Sakura from March 2000 to August 2003. Tokyopop initially released the first six volumes with the book "flipped" from the original Japanese orientation, in which the book is read from right-to-left, to the Western format with text oriented from left-to-right. These volumes were later re-released with the original orientation in two box sets, each containing three volumes. Volumes seven through twelve were released in the original orientation with the subtitle Master of the Clow. Madman Entertainment used Tokyopop's English translation to release the series in Australia and New Zealand. Dark Horse Manga published an English edition of the series in four omnibus volumes containing three of the original volumes each from October 2010 and September 2012. After Dark Horse Comics' license expired, Kodansha Comics licensed it and began releasing the series in hardcover Collector's Edition volumes in 2019. The manga series is licensed for additional regional language releases by Pika Édition in France, Star Comics in Italy, Egmont Manga & Anime in Germany, Editora JBC in Brazil, Ever Glory Publishing in Taiwan, Ediciones Glénat in Spain, Editorial Ivrea in Argentina, and Editorial Toukan and later Editorial Kamite in Mexico.

=== Anime ===
Logo of the Cardcaptor Sakura anime series

A 70-episode anime television series adaptation produced by the animation studio Madhouse aired in Japan on the NHK television network spread over three seasons. The first season, consisting of 35 episodes, aired between April 7 and December 29, 1998. The second season, with 11 episodes, aired between April 6 and June 22, 1999. The third season, containing 24 episodes, aired between September 7, 1999, and March 21, 2000. Directed by Morio Asaka, Clamp was fully involved in the project, with head writer Nanase Ohkawa writing and composing the screenplay and Mokona overseeing the costumes and card designs. The series was later released by Bandai Visual to 18 VHS, LD and DVD compilation volumes from September 1998 to May 2000.

Two Blu-ray Disc box set volumes were released by Geneon in 2009. An upgraded 4K remaster was released in December 2017 as an 11-disc set in both DVD and Blu-ray Disc box sets.

Nelvana announced they had licensed Cardcaptor Sakura in North America in August 1999. Shortly after the announcement and correspondence between the company and a fan, a petition for a subtitled VHS and DVD release began. Nelvana dubbed the series into English with Ocean Studios featuring Carly McKillip as Sakura, and released it under the name Cardcaptors. This version was heavily edited from the original Japanese version, and Nelvana spent roughly $100,000 on each episode to incorporate new music, scripts, and vocal tracks. The initial version of the dub covered all 70 episodes, although character names were changed, some Japanese text was changed to English, and subjects considered controversial at the time, such as same-sex relationships, were edited out. One of the censored themes was that of homosexual characters, including Tomoyo, who was changed from having a crush to being just a friend, and the gay relationship between Toya and Yukito, which was also portrayed as just friends. The musical score was completely replaced with new music and some of the sound effects were replaced when they could not be separated into separate tracks, although the original opening and ending themes were dubbed into English. This version aired in Australia on Network Ten and Cartoon Network, in Ireland on RTÉ2, in the UK on CITV and Nickelodeon, and in Canada on Teletoon (which also aired the episodes with a French dub). An alternative English dub of the series was produced by Omni Productions in Hong Kong to air on Animax Asia and it has been shown entirely unedited and uncut making it very faithfully closer to the original Japanese version, which it broadcast on its English-language networks in Southeast Asia and South Asia.

Cardcaptors first aired in the United States on Kids' WB between June 17, 2000, and December 14, 2001. The version that aired on Kids' WB was an alternate version of the Nelvana dub that was heavily edited even further with episodes re-ordered and some left out completely. The editing to the original Nelvana dub was done to refocus the series to be more action oriented for the appeal of male viewers, as they were seen as the largest audience of animation at the time. The first episode aired in Kids' WB's version was "Sakura's Rival", the eighth episode of the series, having removed episodes focusing on Sakura and to have the show start with Syaoran's arrival. The series ran for 39 episodes, changing the original episode order but finishing with the show's actual final episode. Rather than using the English versions of the original opening and ending themes like in Australia, the North American runs of the series used a new opening theme produced for the dub.

Pioneer Entertainment released the first 27 US Cardcaptors episodes to nine VHS and DVD compilation volumes from November 2000 to July 2002; a planned tenth volume was cancelled in June 2002. They also released the unedited Cardcaptor Sakura series with the original Japanese audio tracks and English subtitles, to 18 DVDs from November 2000 to November 2003; the first 11 volumes were also released in VHS. The Cardcaptor Sakura TV series DVDs went out-of-print at the end of 2006 when the license expired. NIS America has licensed the Cardcaptor Sakura TV series and re-released the entire series with Japanese and an unedited English audio track (Animax Asia's dub) on DVD and Blu-ray on August 5, 2014.

Madman Entertainment licensed the original Cardcaptor Sakura episodes in its uncut form with Japanese audio and English subtitles in Australia and New Zealand, and later released the series in two DVD box collections, one consisting of season one and the other consisting of seasons two and three. Each DVD box set contained the textless openings and endings of the series; the second DVD box set also contained an exclusive interview with Sakura Tange, Sakura Kinomoto's Japanese voice actress. The first DVD box collection was released in September 2012, and the second DVD box collection was released in November 2012.

Anime Limited licensed Cardcaptor Sakura in its original, uncut form in the United Kingdom and Ireland, and made the first season of the series available on Channel 4 via All 4. Pre-orders for a Blu-ray release of the series became available in December 2021. The collection includes all 70 episodes across 10 discs, uses the 2017 remaster of the series in 4K resolution, the Pioneer subtitles, and a 16-page collector's booklet. It does not use the Cardcaptors dub, but the dub aired on Animax Asia. From November 2022 to January 2024, the Animax Asia dub of the series streamed on ITV Hub, along with its successor, ITVX.

=== Films ===
Madhouse produced two, 82-minute anime films as an extension to the anime television series. The first, Cardcaptor Sakura: The Movie, was released on August 21, 1999. Set between the first and second seasons of the TV series, the film shows Sakura and her friends going to Hong Kong, where they encounter a vengeful spirit who was hurt by Clow Reed in the past. It was released to VHS, LD and DVD in Japan by Bandai Visual in February 2000. Nelvana released an English dubbed version of the film, retaining the same name and story changes as its main Cardcaptors dub, although it was dubbed with no visual edits and was released in cut and uncut versions. As with the TV series, Pioneer Entertainment also released the film with the original Japanese audio and English subtitles, and also released a bilingual DVD containing both audio tracks. Both the edited and unedited versions were released on VHS and DVD in March 2002. Discotek Media released the first film on Blu-ray Disc and DVD on September 30, 2014, in North America.

The second film, Cardcaptor Sakura Movie 2: The Sealed Card, was released in Japan on July 15, 2000. It provided a conclusion to the TV series, in which Syaoran returns to Tokyo in hopes of getting Sakura's answer to his love confession, but her own confession is interrupted by the appearance of a 53rd Clow Card. It was released to LD (as a limited edition) and DVD in January 2001, and to VHS in July 2001. It was released in North America to DVD by Pioneer in November 2003 and featured an English dub by Bang Zoom! Entertainment instead of Nelvana and Ocean Studios, now with Kari Wahlgren as Sakura, and this time retaining the original character names and the content unedited and uncut. The films as released by Pioneer (later renamed Geneon) remained in print in North America until late 2007. A bonus short film titled Leave it to Kero! was played with the theatrical screening of the second film.

=== Audio CDs ===
As a preview to the anime series, Kodansha released a tankōbon-sized CD volume titled CD Comic Cardcaptor Sakura in August 1997 containing two character songs sung by the voice actors of Sakura and Tomoyo and drama tracks. Two drama CDs were released for the series. The first, Sakura to Okaa-san no Organ, was released in July 1998 featuring a script written by Clamp author Nanase Ohkawa. It depicts Sakura having a dream about her mother playing an organ and choosing to write about her the following day for a school project. The second CD, Sweet Valentine Stories, was released in February 1999 and depicts a single day in the life of the girls in Sakura's class, including Sakura herself. Four original soundtrack CD albums were released for the anime television series from July 1998 to March 2000. The soundtracks included instrumental background music and the vocal theme songs. Two soundtracks were produced for the films: the first film's soundtrack was released in August 1999, followed by the second film's soundtrack in August 2000.

Nine singles were released; six for its television series and three for its films. Opening themes include "Catch You Catch Me" by Gumi in April 1998, "Tobira o Akete" by Anza in April 1999, and "Platinum" by Maaya Sakamoto in October 1999. Ending themes included "Groovy!" by Kohmi Hirose in September 1998, "Honey" by Chihiro in May 1999, and "Fruits Candy" by Megumi Kojima in November 1999. Two of the ending themes for its films include "Tōi Kono Machi de" by Naomi Kaitani in August 1999 for the first film, and "Ashita e no Melody" by Chaka in July 2000 for the second film. The theme song for its short film Leave It To Kero! shown with the second film, "Okashi no Uta", was released in July 2000.

Six character song singles sung by the voice actors of Sakura, Toya, Cerberus, Tomoyo, Yukito and Syaoran released in June 1998; each single also contained a short drama track. A character song album titled Cardcaptor Sakura Character Songbook was released in January 1999 containing tracks from the previously released character song singles as well as new tracks sung by the various voice actors. An album titled Tomoeda Elementary Choir Club Christmas Concert, released in December 1999, contains seven tracks by a children's choir, including five where they are joined by Junko Iwao, the voice actress for Tomoyo. A four-CD compilation set, Complete Vocal Collection, was released in February 2001 compiling the series' theme songs, tracks from the character song singles, remixes of previously released songs, and new music. An album containing music from the entire series and films titled Cardcaptor Sakura Theme Song Collection was released in December 2001. Victor Entertainment released the albums and singles for Cardcaptor Sakura. For Western releases, there is an original soundtrack for Cardcaptors titled Cardcaptors: Songs from the Hit TV Series that was released in September 2001 by Rhino Entertainment.

=== Video games ===
Ten video games have been produced based on the series and released on a variety of video game and handheld consoles. They feature various genres, such as adventure and role-playing video games.

Title	Release date	Producer(s)	Platform
Cardcaptor Sakura: Itsumo Sakura-chan to Issho! (カードキャプターさくら ～いつもさくらちゃんといっしょ～, Cardcaptor Sakura: Forever with Sakura-chan)	JP: May 15, 1999	Published by MTO	Game Boy Color
Animetic Story Game 1: Cardcaptor Sakura (アニメチックストーリーゲーム (1) カードキャプターさくら)	JP: August 5, 1999	Published and developed by Arika	PlayStation
Cardcaptor Sakura: Sakura to Fushigi na Clow Cards (カードキャプターさくら ～さくらとふしぎなクロウカード～, Cardcaptor Sakura: Sakura and the Mysterious Clow Card)	JP: December 2, 1999	Published by Bandai and developed by Sims	WonderSwan
Cardcaptor Sakura: Tomoyo no Video Daisakusen (カードキャプターさくら 知世のビデオ大作戦, Cardcaptor Sakura: Tomoyo's Video Battle)	JP: December 28, 2000	Published by Sega and developed by Sega Rosso	Dreamcast
Cardcaptor Sakura: Clow Card Magic (カードキャプターさくら クロウカードマジック)	JP: January 27, 2000	Published and developed by Arika	PlayStation
Tetris with Cardcaptor Sakura: Eternal Heart (TETRiS with カードキャプターさくら エターナルハート)	JP: August 10, 2000	Published and developed by Arika	PlayStation
Cardcaptor Sakura: Tomoe Shōgakkō Daiundōkai (カードキャプターさくら ～友枝小学校大運動会～, Cardcaptor Sakura: Tomoe Elementary School Battle Athletes)	JP: October 6, 2000	Published by MTO	Game Boy Color
Cardcaptor Sakura: Sakura Card de Mini-Game (カードキャプターさくら ～さくらカードdeミニゲーム～)	JP: December 12, 2003	Published and developed by TDK Core	Game Boy Advance
Cardcaptor Sakura: Sakura Card-hen Sakura Card to Tomodachi (カードキャプターさくら <さくらカード編> ~さくらとカードとおともだち~, Cardcaptor Sakura: Sakura Card Edition: Sakura Card and Friend)	JP: April 23, 2004	Published by MTO	Game Boy Advance
Cardcaptor Sakura: Sakura-chan to Asobo! (カードキャプターさくら 「さくらちゃんとあそぼ!」, Cardcaptor Sakura: Play with Sakura-chan)	JP: December 2, 2004	Published by NHK Software	PlayStation 2

=== Other media ===
Kodansha published three art books for the manga series and three art books from for the anime television series featuring art by character designer Kumiko Takahashi. The three books for the manga titled Cardcaptor Sakura Illustration Collection were released from July 1998 to December 2000. The three for the TV series titled Cheerio! were released from April 1999 to September 2000. A set of the 52 Clow Cards featured in the TV series was released in August 1999 and a Clow Card Fortune Book, which contains information on how to use the Clow Card replica set as tarot cards, was released in March 2000.

A fan book for the manga titled Cardcaptor Sakura Memorial Book was published on February 27, 2001, containing various illustrations from the series, as well as information on branded merchandise based on the series and interviews. Four fan books under the title Complete Book were released for the TV series and films. The first two for the TV series were labeled Clow Card-hen (クロウカード編, Clow Card Arc) and Sakura Card-hen (さくらカード編, Sakura Card Arc) and were released in July 1999 and June 2000, respectively. The latter two for the films were released in October 1999 and October 2000, respectively. A poster box containing several posters and a T-shirt was released on August 22, 2001.

Ten volumes of a film comic sharing the same name as the manga and anime series were published from August 1998 to November 2000 covering the first two anime seasons, though some episodes were skipped. Three more were published under the subtitle, Sakura Card-hen from March 2001 to February 2002 covering up to episode 59, though again some episodes were skipped. Four picture books were released for the TV series from September 1998 to November 2000. Four sticker books were released for the TV series from August 1999 to March 2004.

Between February and July 2018, three Cardcaptor Sakura-themed cafés opened in Tokyo, Osaka and Sapporo. The restaurants featured decorations of artwork from the series, and served menu items connected to Cardcaptor Sakura characters or items.

== Reception ==
=== Manga ===
The manga has over 17 million copies in print by April 2018. Cardcaptor Sakura was popular with Japanese readers, ranking among the top five sellers during its release. The manga series was awarded the Seiun Award for Best Manga in 2001. Shaenon Garrity of The Comics Journal described the series as a quintessential shōjo manga, which is praised for its mature direction in the second half. Cardcaptor Sakura has been described as a "critical work" of manga by Christopher Butcher of Comics212. In a review by Lisa Anderson of Manga Life, the subplots in the series related to the interactions between characters were noted to be of special interest. Anderson praised how the manga, while at the onset begins with a costumed Sakura chasing after a Clow Card, takes a "rather big leap in another direction" when focusing on the characters. The manga is further lauded for its depth. Anime News Network (ANN) reviewer Robert Nguyen felt Cardcaptor Sakura is an "atypical shōjo" manga, which puts an "emphasis on the emotions of the character."

In Manga: The Complete Guide, Mason Templar states that the series is not "just one of the best kids' manga in translation, it's one of the very best manga available in English, period." He praises Clamp for their creativity and shrewd business sense, in being able to create a series that "clearly has merchandising in line" and an "utterly forgettable premise" into a story that is "brimming with warmth and joy and wonder" and is "much more than the sum of its parts." The manga is cited as being cute by critics, and in some cases too cute; however, Anderson stated that "much like Magic Knight Rayearth, even a cute story will have its depth and drama." The artwork of the manga is praised for being detailed and having "beautifully drawn pictures of the Clow Cards themselves." The cards are described as having "an artful blend of magical fantasy and reality."

=== Anime ===
The anime adaptation was popular with viewers in Japan, despite having a timeslot that normally has low viewership. The Cardcaptor Sakura anime adaptation won the Animage Grand Prix award for best anime in 1999. In May 2000, volumes 8 and 17 of the anime LD release were among the top selling titles, with volume 17 being in first place. The 18th DVD volume was the eighth best selling anime DVD in Japan in June 2000. Animerica contributor Kevin Lew felt the series had a "sophisticated design sense" that allowed the series to transcend its target audience of young children and be enjoyable to older viewers as well. Fellow contributor Takashi Oshiguichi found the character Sakura to be appealing and praised the series art work. He felt that while it was "very calculated" to attract male readers, the series was attractive to fans due to Clamp's "unique entertainment style" that incorporates "perfectly time[d] appearances of "fascinating villains" and the unusual element of having the main character change costume for every capture. The magazine's Winnie Chow felt the series' animation was "far above average for a TV series", and compliments Sakura's magic-casting scenes for being nearly unique due to the regular costume changes. In TV Asahi's poll of the Top 100 Anime, Cardcaptor Sakura came in 87th.

Zac Bertschy of ANN praised Cardcaptor Sakura for taking an "incredibly stale and repetitive" magical girl genre and "providing something fun, clever, beautifully animated, touching and exciting all at once;" Bertschy goes on to call the series "the best magical girl show ever produced." The animation was described as being "incredibly fluid" with the character designs "maintain[ing] a consistent and impressive level of detail, even during action scenes." The series has been described as formulaic, but this is not said to detract from the show's enjoyment. While Cardcaptor Sakura is normally intended for an audience of young girls, the anime is lauded for containing "elements that can be enjoyed by anyone, regardless of age or gender, providing they are open-minded enough." In 2001, the anime ranked 46th on Wizard's Anime Magazine's "Top 50 Anime released in North America" ranking. Cat Dennis of Screen Rant praised Sakura for maintaining a "conventionally feminine persona" rather than adopting male characteristics, with her power stemming from her outfits, heart, and love, meaning that the show "explores the complexities of love, both platonic and romantic." Hannah Collins of The Mary Sue called the series an anime "filled with genuine warmth, tenderness, and a strong, underlying message of acceptance,".

The Nelvana version of the Cardcaptors dub was panned by critics. Jake Godek of THEM Anime Reviews called it "the worst thing that has ever happened to anime that had a good Japanese name," with the dubbing being "one of the worst if not the worst dubbing done for a program." He also criticized the editing, saying that it had "demolished the plot" and noting that it cut out vital character backgrounds needed in order to understand the show. Adam Arnold of Animefringe, reviewing the first Cardcaptors DVD, said it was "nothing more than an attempt to dilute a fan favorite anime," with the dubbed voices described as "not up-to-par with the originals." The ordering of the episodes on the DVD was also criticized, noting that starting with episode eight meant that the cast are "left without their backgrounds fleshed out." However, he also approved of the episode stories being left intact, and praised the voices of Carly McKillip as Sakura Avalon and Rhys Huber as Syaoran Li, stating that they were the "only voices that really shine above the rest."

In January 2002, the restaurant chain Taco Bell began a month-long promotion in which four Cardcaptors toys were available in their kids' meals and the company expected to distribute up to 7 million of the toys during the month. The "conservative Christian political orientation" American Family Association complained about the promotion as the organization felt the Clow Cards in the series were too similar to tarot cards and Eastern mythology. However, the organization's complaints did not begin until the promotion was already scheduled to end, so it is unclear whether the complaints had any actual effect.
