= Sabrina: Friends Forever =

2002 American TV film or program

- DVD cover
- Based on: Sabrina the Teenage Witch by: Dan DeCarlo; George Gladir
- Written by: Pamela Pettler; Carter Crocker
- Directed by: Scott Heming
- Starring: Britt McKillip; Jay Brazeau; Tina Bush; Alexandra Carter; Garry Chalk; Marilyn Gann; Louis Chirillo; Andrew Kavadas; Carly McKillip; Vanessa Morley; Jane Mortifee; Teryl Rothery; Moneca Stori; Samuel Vincent; Dale Wilson
- Country of origin: United States
- Original language: English

Production
- Producer: Charles W. Grimes
- Running time: 74 minutes
- Production companies: Archie Entertainment; DIC Entertainment

Original release
- Network: Nickelodeon
- Release: October 6, 2002

Related
- Sabrina: The Animated Series (1999); Sabrina's Secret Life (2003–2004)

Sabrina: Friends Forever (also known as Sabrina the Teenage Witch: Friends Forever!) is a 2002 American animated television film produced by DIC Entertainment as part of their DIC Movie Toons series of movies. It originally aired on October 6, 2002, on Nickelodeon in the United States and was later released onto VHS and DVD by MGM Home Entertainment, followed on with international airings on Disney Channel and Toon Disney. It is a continuation of the animated television series Sabrina: The Animated Series and was followed by another television series, Sabrina's Secret Life.

== Plot ==
The film shows Sabrina Spellman turning 13 years old and receiving her first magic wand from Enchantra. As custom for all witchlings, she enrolls in the Witch Academy to learn the three principles of witchdom (to use magic wisely, be true to one's friends, and be true to oneself). Feeling inferior because she's only a half-witch, Sabrina conceals her mixed heritage and manages to become popular. Sabrina joins her new friends in making fun of Nicole Candler, a "bookworm" who doesn't fit in. When Sabrina discovers that Nicole is a half-witch like herself, the pair become good friends. Sabrina's other friends' figure something is going on between Sabrina and Nicole and set out to prove that Nicole is a half-witch. They accomplish this by levitating up to a tree outside and find the half star on her hand. Sabrina visits Nicole in her dorm room and together, they begin a journey to the witches' realm in hopes of becoming full witches.

Entering the witches' realm, Sabrina and Nicole meet a witch who shows them three doors leading to three fantasy worlds. Both girls enter the first door and become mermaids. Making their way back to the realm, they try the second door and become figure skaters. After skating into a hockey net, a hockey player appears on the ice and shoots pucks into the net where both girls are. The girls throw a few pucks at the hockey player in frustration and a hockey brawl takes place. Sabrina and Nicole escape from the pile-up and exit back into the realm. They go into the third and final door where they become princesses meet two princes and begin to dance. Enchantra finds out from the witch academy the two girls are in the realm and sends two of her minions to get them.

Sabrina and Nicole reach the wish-granting wisdom tree in the witches' realm. Sabrina steps forward first to make her wish and asks to be a full witch. Her wish is granted; by taking Nicole's half-witch powers. This makes Nicole a mortal and consequently turns her to stone since a mortal can't be in the witches' realm. Sabrina asks the tree to change her back, but it is too late. Distraught and enraged, she is about to turn herself into stone when she is stopped by Enchantra, who is touched by her unselfish action and breaks the spell on Nicole, returning both girls to half-witches in the process.

At the graduation ceremony, Sabrina receives the Golden Wand from Enchantra. Afterwards she tells the truth to the students for making fun of Nicole because of her heritage and reveals that she is also a half-witch. Sabrina decides to give half of the Golden Wand to Nicole to prove that they are good friends.

== Voice cast ==
- Britt McKillip - Sabrina Spellman
- Tina Bush - Zelda Spellman
- Moneca Stori - Hilda Spellman
- Louis Chirillo - Salem Saberhagen
- Alexandra Carter - Nicole Candler
- Jay Brazeau - Uncle Eustace
- Garry Chalk - Warlock #1, Cringe
- Marilyn Gann - Miss Hag
- Andrew Kavadas - Flat Ears
- Carly McKillip - Portia
- Vanessa Morley - Bree
- Jane Mortifee - Enchantra
- Teryl Rothery - Miss Fetid
- Samuel Vincent - Craven
- Dale Wilson - Mr. Rancid
- Colin Murdock - Hockey Player
- Alistair Abell - Hockey Player
- Brent Miller - Hockey Player

== See also ==
- List of films about witchcraft
