= Susan Juby =

Canadian writer (born 1969)

- Born: March 30, 1969 (age 57); Ponoka, Alberta
- Occupation: Novelist
- Spouse: James Waring
- Writing career
- Genre: Comedic
- Notable works: Alice, I Think, Republic of Dirt, Mindful of Murder
- Website: susanjuby.com

Susan Juby (born March 30, 1969) is a Canadian writer. She is currently residing in Nanaimo, British Columbia, where she is a professor of creative writing at Vancouver Island University.

Juby is known for her comedic writing. Her first series started with Alice, I Think (2000), which was adapted into the television series Alice, I Think by The Comedy Network.

== Background ==
Juby was born in Ponoka, Alberta, and later moved to Smithers, British Columbia at the age of six.

Juby initially attended fashion design school, but dropped out after several months. She subsequently started a degree in English literature at the University of Toronto, transferring to the University of British Columbia after two years. After graduating she became an editor at a book publishing company called Hartley and Marks.

== Career ==
Juby began her first book as a journal which she wrote on the bus on the way to work and at a local coffee shop. Thistledown published her first book Alice, I Think in 2000. The book was named one of the essential 40 young adult novels by Rolling Stone Magazine.

Juby completed a master's degree in publishing (MPub) from Simon Fraser University in 2002. After publishing Alice, I Think (2000), HarperCollins offered her a contract for three books. Her second book Miss Smithers was published in 2004. To complete the trilogy of Alice, I Think all under one publisher, the original book was bought by HarperCollins. Her third book under this contact was Alice McLeod: Realist at Last, published in 2005. The Comedy Network developed Alice, I Think, a television sitcom based on the novel of the same name. The first episode aired in 2006.

Juby went on to write Another Kind of Cowboy (2007) and a young adult detective novel, Getting the Girl (2008). In 2010, Viking Canada published Nice Recovery, Juby's memoir tracing the time between her experience with teenage alcoholism until her sobriety at age 20.

HarperCollins published Juby's next book in 2011, Home to Woefield (also known as The Woefield Poultry Collective in Canada). This was her first book aimed at an adult audience. She would later write a sequel, Republic of Dirt (2015). In 2016, Republic of Dirt won the Stephen Leacock Award.

Other books by Juby include the dystopian young adult novel Bright's Light (2012), as well as The Truth Commission (2015), and The Fashion Committee (2017), a pair of young adult novels set in an art high school. Her first novel for middle grade readers is called Me Three (2022). Her first mystery novel for adults is called Mindful of Murder. The book features Helen Thorpe, a former buddhist nun turned butler, who finds herself embroiled in the mystery of who killed her former employer. Mindful of Murder debuted at #1 in Canada's independent bookstores list of bestsellers.

Juby was inducted into the Royal Society of Canada's College of New Scholars, Artists, and Scientists in 2014.

On February 22, 2020, Juby read excerpts from two as-yet-unpublished works at the Vancouver Island Regional Library's Nanaimo Harbourfront branch. Mindful of Murder is Juby's first crime novel for adults. Me 3 is a middle-grade novel that addresses the #MeToo movement from a child's perspective.

== Personal life ==
Juby is an environmental rights activist in her community. She is a creative writing professor at Vancouver Island University, in Nanaimo, British Columbia.

== Published works ==
- Alice, I Think (2000)
- I'm Alice (Beauty Queen?) (2004) (Published as Miss Smithers in the United States)
- Alice Macleod: Realist at Last (2005)
- Another Kind of Cowboy (2007)
- Getting the Girl: A Guide to Private Investigation, Surveillance and Cookery (2008)
- Nice Recovery (2010)
- The Woefield Poultry Collective (2011) (Published as Home to Woefield in the United States)
- Bright's Light (2012)
- Republic of Dirt (2015)
- The Truth Commission (2015)
- The Fashion Committee (2017)
- Mindful of Murder (2022)
- Me Three (2022)
- A Meditation On Murder (2024)
