= Alexandra Carter =

Canadian voice actress

- Occupation: Voice actress
- Years active: 2001–2012

Alexandra Carter is a Canadian former actress who worked with Ocean Productions of Vancouver, British Columbia. Best known for her cute and nerdy characters, she was usually cast in the roles of children. Her last credited role was in 2012, doing a voice for the video game Sins of a Solar Empire: Rebellion. By 2013, if not earlier, she was working as a physician assistant in Albuquerque, New Mexico.

Her roles include Aoi Housen in Infinite Ryvius, Sapphire in Trollz, Magma in X-Men: Evolution, Princess Graciella in Barbie: A Fairy Secret, Rosy in Hamtaro, Nana in Meltylancer, Nicole Candler in Sabrina: Friends Forever, Yagami in Maison Ikkoku, Paradice in Ōban Star-Racers, Momiji the Red Priestess in InuYasha, and Twist in My Little Pony: Friendship Is Magic.

She graduated in 2005, as class valedictorian, in H.J. Cambie Secondary School in Richmond. Her sister, Adrienne Carter, is also an actress.

== Filmography ==
=== Film ===
Year	Title	Role	Notes
2006	A Very Fairy Christmas	Courtney Reynolds (voice)	Direct-to-video
2011	Barbie: A Fairy Secret	Princess Graciella (voice)	Direct-to-video

=== Television ===
Year	Title	Role	Notes
2001-2003	X-Men: Evolution	Amara Aquilla / Magma (voice)	Recurring role
2002	Inuyasha	Momiji (voice)	English dub; 2 episodes
2002	Sabrina: Friends Forever	Nicole Candler (voice)	Television film
2003	Meltylancer: The Animation	Nany Neinhalten (voice)	English dub
2003	Infinite Ryvius	Aoi Housen (voice)	English dub
2004	Master Keaton	Young Sachiko Shiratori (voice)	English dub
2005	Hikaru no Go	Asumi Nase (voice)	English dub
2006	Class of the Titans	Gold (voice)	Episode: "Sibling Rivalry"
2011	My Little Pony: Friendship Is Magic	Twist (voice)	2 episodes

=== Video games ===
Year	Title	Role	Notes
2003	Mobile Suit Gundam: Encounters in Space	Fraw Bow	
