= Wes Mack =

Canadian musician, actor, and director

Wesley MacInnes
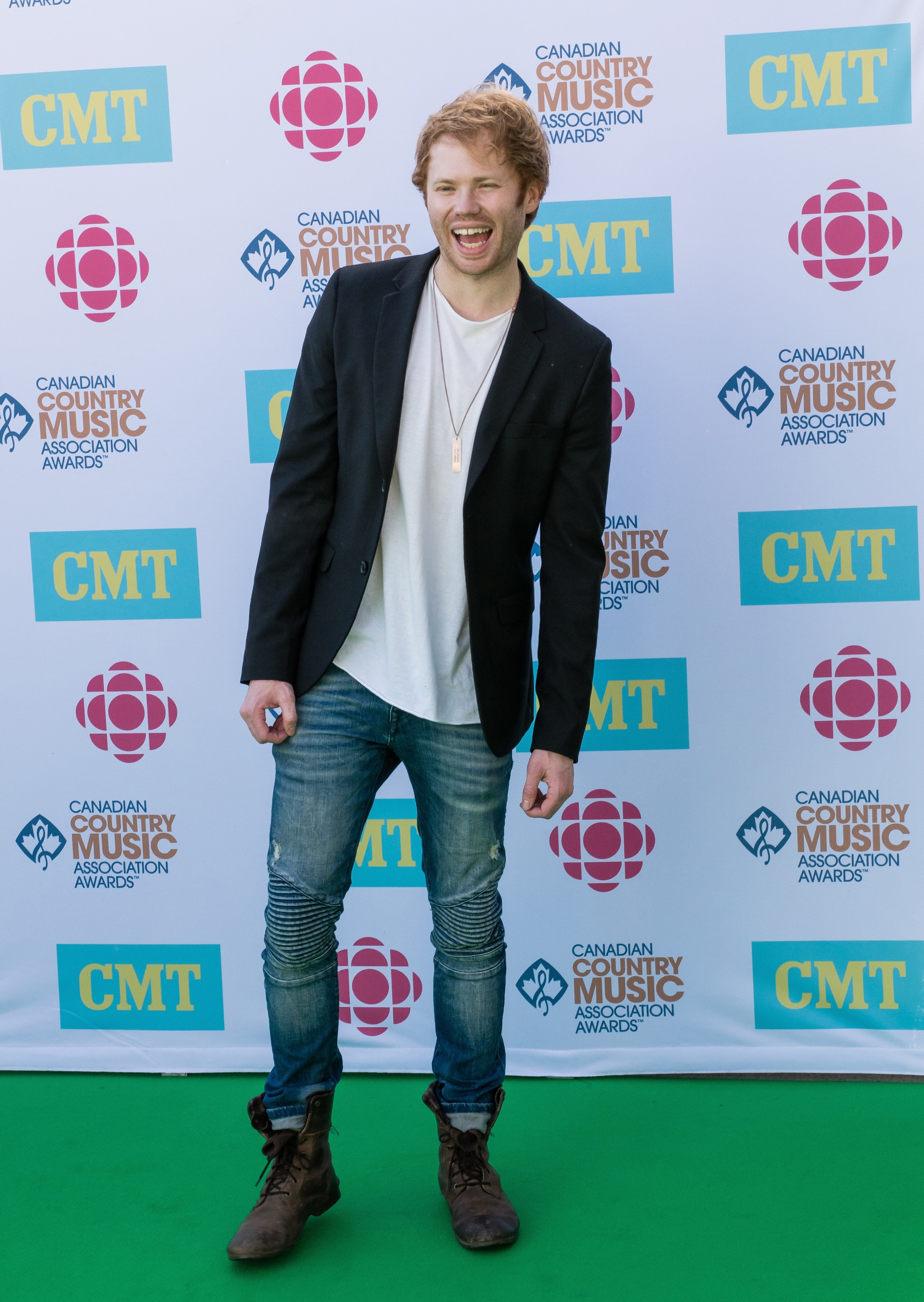
- Wes Mack in 2016
- Born: Calgary, Alberta, Canada
- Other names: Wes Mack
- Occupations: Actor, musician
- Known for: Icicle in Smallville; Austin Mars in Heartland
- Website: wesleymacinnes.com

Wesley MacInnes is a Canadian country musician who performs under the stage name Wes Mack. He is also an actor and a director.

== Early life ==
MacInnes was born in Calgary, Alberta. He lives in Vancouver, British Columbia.

== Music career ==
MacInnes performs as a country musician under the name Wes Mack. In June 2013, Mack released his debut single, "Duet" (featuring Carly McKillip of Canadian country duo One More Girl) to Canadian country radio. The song, mixed by producer Joey Moi, peaked at number 9 on the Country Billboard Chart and also landed Mack the overall grand prize in the International Unsigned Only Music competition.

In September 2013, Mack received a Canadian Country Music Association award.

He released a second independent single in late 2013, shortly before announcing his signing a record deal with Big Machine and Universal Music (in a joint venture). He was nominated for three Canadian country music awards: Video of the year (Duet), rising star, and video director of the year (for One More Girl's Love Like Mine).

In January 2015, Mack released his debut major label single, Before You Drive Me Crazy. The song peaked at #6 on the Canadian Country Billboard chart. In June 2015 Mack released his second major label single, The Way You Let Me Down (which peaked at number 11 on the Canadian Country Billboard chart) and began the first leg of Shania Twain's Rock This Country farewell tour serving as the only opening act. After completing the first leg, Mack was asked by Twain to return for a number of additional performances in Canada in the fall. In September 2015, Mack performed on the CCMA Awards show and was nominated for two awards (Music video director of the year and songwriter of the year).

In 2016, Mack released a new single titled Listen To Me, and once again directed the music video, which featured a mixture of current footage, clips from Mack's childhood, sections from his teenage years as well as footage from his tour with Shania Twain. His album Edge of the Storm was nominated for Album of the Year at the 2016 CCMA Awards, where he was also nominated for Interactive Artist of the Year.

== Acting career ==
From 2009 to 2010, MacInnes appeared in two CW shows, The Vampire Diaries and Smallville (where he played the supervillain Icicle in the two-hour TV movie Smallville: Absolute Justice). He also portrayed a young Bruce Greenwood, in the Hallmark Hall of Fame film A Dog Named Christmas.

In 2011, MacInnes was cast in a recurring role on CBC's Heartland as country musician Austin Mars - the romantic interest of series lead Mallory Wells. He also appeared in the Lifetime Network biopic Magic Beyond Words: The JK Rowling Story (starring Poppy Montgomery) playing the character Sean Harris – the real life inspiration for the Ron Weasley character in the literary and film franchise, Harry Potter.

In 2019, MacInnes appeared opposite Oscar-nominated actor Liam Neeson in the action thriller film, Cold Pursuit. MacInnes portrayed the character Dante.

== Filmography ==
Year	Title	Role
2009	The Vampire Diaries	Peeing Guy #1
2009	A Dog Named Christmas	George - Age 20
2010	Smallville	Icicle
2011	Magic Beyond Words: The JK Rowling Story	Sean Harris
2011–12	Heartland	Austin Mars
2012	The Phantoms	Kevin O Neill
2012	Continuum	Hoyt Gerber
2014	Supernatural	Thaddeus/Corey
2014	The 100	Derek
2014	Girl House	Alex
2015	Motive	Theo
2016	iZombie	Hunter
2016	Warcraft	Gate Guard
2017	Power Rangers	Colt Wallace (credited as "Bully")
2019	Cold Pursuit	Dante

== Discography ==
=== Studio albums ===
Title	Album details
Edge of the Storm	Release date: September 4, 2015; Label: Universal Music Canada
Soul	Release date: October 25, 2019; Label: Creator Brand Label Co.
Hummingbird	Release date: October 20, 2023; Label: Wes Mack

=== EPs ===
Title	Album details
Wes Mack	Release date: June 2, 2015; Label: Universal Music Canada

=== Singles ===
Year	Title	Peak chart positions	
Year	Title	CAN	CAN Country
2013	"Duet"	89	9
2013	"Our Soundtrack"	—	20
2015	"Before You Drive Me Crazy"	98	6
2015	"The Way You Let Me Down"	100	12
2015	"I Lost Count"	—	29
2016	"Listen to Me"	—	—
2025	"Where the Lost Get Found"	—	58
"—" denotes releases that did not chart

== Music videos ==
Year	Video	Director	Album
2013	"Duet" (with Carly McKillip)	Wes Mack	Edge of the Storm
2013	"Our Soundtrack"	Wes Mack	Edge of the Storm
2015	"Before You Drive Me Crazy"	Wes Mack	Edge of the Storm
2015	"The Way You Let Me Down"	Andy Hines	Edge of the Storm
2015	"I Lost Count"	Emma Higgins/Jack Chen	Edge of the Storm
2016	"Listen to Me"	Wes Mack	Edge of the Storm
2018	"House on Fire"	Wes Mack	Soul
2018	"PBR State of Mind"	Wes Mack	Soul
2019	"Never Have I Ever" (ft. Sons of Daughters)	Wes Mack	Soul
2019	"Best Hangover" (ft. Maddie Storvold)	Wes Mack	Soul

== Awards and nominations ==
Year	Association	Category	Result
2014	Canadian Country Music Association	Rising Star	Nominated
2014	Canadian Country Music Association	CMT Video of the Year – "Duet"	Nominated
2014	Canadian Country Music Association	Video Director of the Year	Nominated
2015	Canadian Country Music Association	Songwriter of the Year – "Before You Drive Me Crazy"	Nominated
2015	Canadian Country Music Association	Video Director of the Year	Nominated
2016	Canadian Country Music Association	Album of the Year - Edge Of The Storm	Nominated
2016	Canadian Country Music Association	Interactive Artist of the Year	Nominated
2024	Canadian Country Music Association	Songwriter(s) of the Year - "Whiskey in Colorado"	Nominated
