= Trollz (TV series) =

American animated television series

- The main characters (left to right): Sapphire, Topaz, Amethyst, Ruby, and Onyx
- Genre: Fantasy; Comedy; Action; Adventure
- Created by: Andy Heyward
- Based on: Troll doll by Thomas Dam
- Developed by: Eric Lewald; John Loy
- Directed by: Karen Hyden
- Starring: Britt McKillip; Chiara Zanni; Alexandra Carter; Leah Juel; Anna Van Hooft; Samuel Vincent; Reece Thompson; Jesse Moss; Matt Hill
- Theme music composer: Ron Wasserman
- Opening theme: "It's a Hair Thing" by Valli Girls
- Ending theme: "It's a Hair Thing" (reprise)
- Composers: Jean-Michel Guirao; L.A. Piccirillo; Ron Wasserman
- Country of origin: United States
- Original language: English
- No. of seasons: 1
- No. of episodes: 27

Production
- Executive producers: Andy Heyward; Michael Maliani
- Running time: 21–22 minutes
- Production companies: Studio DAM; DIC Entertainment (Note: Animation outsourced to Hong Ying Universe Company, Ltd.); Melusine Productions

Original release
- Network: Syndication (DIC Kids Network)
- Release: October 3 – November 8, 2005

Trollz is an American children's animated series produced by DIC Entertainment. The trolls were based on the troll doll created by Thomas Dam in the 1950s. A single season was produced with a total of 27 episodes. A second season was planned, but was later cancelled.

== Premise ==
The show centers the adventures of five teenaged female trolls (with gems on their belly buttons), who call themselves the Best Friends For Life, who use magic every day to help them with their everyday life as well as battling whatever magical creatures and issues they may find themselves up against in their everyday lives.

== Characters ==
=== Main ===
The main characters in the series are collectively known as the "Best Friends For Life".

- Amethyst van der Troll (voiced by Britt McKillip) is the leader of the BFFL. She is a young and naive girl who loves her friends and would do anything for them. Amethyst is also considerate and gives good advice to her friends. Her gem is a pinkish-purple heart.
- Ruby Trollman (voiced by Chiara Zanni) is the bossy girl and second-in-command of the BFFL, and, as such, is really pushy and passionately cares about her looks. If she really wants something, she will do anything to get it. Her gem is a red star.
- Sapphire Trollzawa (voiced by Alexandra Carter) is the smartest girl of the BFFL. When the friends have slumber parties, Sapphire just wants to study. Her gem is a blue flower.
- Topaz Trollhopper (voiced by Leah Juel) is a troll who is a bit of an airhead with a big heart. She loves shopping, is a fashion expert. Her gem is a yellow diamond.
- Onyx Von Trollenberg (voiced by Anna Van Hooft) is a goth girl and has a liking for poetry. She acts aloof but she cares deeply about her friends. She may not be the toughest member of the BFFL, but she is confirmed as the heart of the BFFL. Her gem is a purplish-black moon.

=== Villains ===
- Simon (voiced by Reece Thompson) is a gremlin and the main antagonist of the series. His primary goal is to take over Trollzopolis and get revenge against the Best Friends For Life.
- Snarf (voiced by Janyse Jaud) is a dog-like creature and Simon's loyal henchman who sticks by his side despite enduring endless abuse. He is able to change from a cute-looking puppy to a larger bestial form at will.

=== Supporting ===
==== Boys ====
- Coal Trollwell (voiced by Jesse Moss) is Amethyst's boyfriend. He is a very clumsy troll who often gets into trouble.
- Rock Trollhammer (voiced by Matt Hill) is a muscular troll and Ruby's boyfriend. He is very dimwitted and forgetful.
- Alabaster Trollington III (voiced by Samuel Vincent) is a mild-mannered troll and Sapphire's boyfriend. He is a multi-millionaire whose father owns many of the companies in Trollzopolis.
- Jasper Trollhound (voiced by Armen Weitzman) is Topaz's boyfriend. He accidentally lost his hair to a spell cast by Amethyst, but becomes used to his new appearance and comes to not mind.
- Flint Trollentino (voiced by Mike Antonakos) is Onyx's boyfriend. He is in a rock band, and loves writing poetry.

==== Ancients ====
- Grandma Van Der Troll is Amethyst's grandmother.
- Obsidian is the owner of Obsidian's Spell Shop.
- Mr. Slate Trollheimer (voiced by Jason Connery) is the girls' teacher.
- Zirconia (voiced by Jane Mortifee) is Spinell's wife. She was transformed into a tree by Simon 3,000 years prior before being restored to normal in the present.
- Spinell is Zirconia's husband. 3,000 years prior, he was transformed into a dragon by Simon and forced to serve him. In the present day, Spinell is restored to normal.

==== Rivals ====
- Coral Trollarwise (voiced by Ashleigh Ball) is the senior captain of the cheerleaders. She is in constant rivalry with Ruby, usually for a cute boy's attention. Her gem is a maroon ace of spades.
- Opal Trollangel is Coral's friend. She has light pink hair and an oval gem.
- Jade Trollcroft is Coral's friend. She has spiky lime green hair and a diamond gem.

=== Other ===
- Kaboom is a dim-witted but friendly volunteer at Obsidian's shop who tends to be the subject of spell experiments.

=== Additional voices ===
- Mike Antonakos
- Ashleigh Ball
- Molly Bolt
- Maria Dimon
- Ben Einstein
- Brian George
- Michael Heyward
- Matt Hill
- Janyse Jaud
- Ellen Kennedy
- Connor Lee McGuire
- Vincent Maliani
- Blu Mankuma
- Christine Moore
- Jane Mortifee
- Jesse Moss
- Richard Newman
- Christina Pazsitzky
- Alan Young
- Ellie Stenehjem
- Alexandra Thompoulos
- Reece Thompson
- Lee Tockar
- Stevie Vallance
- Samuel Vincent
- Lizzy Walker
- Janet Wells
- Dale Wilson

== Episodes ==
Episode no.	Episode title	Written by	Air date	Description	Story arc
1	Best Friends for Life	Eric Lewald; John Loy	October 3, 2005	Amethyst returns from a summer away to find that she can now cast spells. When crew "leader" Ruby is upstaged by Amethyst, she gets angry and gives Amethyst the boot from the group. The remaining BFFL take it upon themselves to scare the feuding friends back together by transforming Topaz into an ogre.	Best Friends for Life
2	Five Spells Trouble	John Loy	October 4, 2005	When the five Trollz try casting a spell together to make Coal less of a klutz, they accidentally freeze Coal in ice and cause an earthquake to hit Trollzopolis. The girls meet the mysterious Obsidian, who introduces them to the lore of the Trolls. Obsidian takes them to the Ancient World, where the girls overcome obstacles and set things right in the world above.	Best Friends for Life
3	First Day of School	Carter Crocker	October 5, 2005	In an effort to solve their own problems, without asking for assistance, the girls perform a spell that has disastrous results. Evil Snarf is released from the Ancient World and the girls do not know how to return him. Mr. Slate and wise Obsidian come to their aid just in time to save the crew from Snarf.	Best Friends for Life
4	Onyx's Gem	Cliff MacGillivray; Kelly Ward	October 6, 2005	The BFFL girls discover that their Gems are dimming. A quick fix they try is revealed to be a trick by Snarf, who lures them into the Shadow World to free his master Simon. Only by working together can the girls escape Simon and bring the glow back to their gems.	The Magic of the Five
5	Topaz Possessed	Len Uhley	October 7, 2005	Simon takes advantage of Topaz's weak will and possesses her body.	The Magic of the Five
6	The Big Test	Sean Roche	October 10, 2005	The girls try to use a list of chemistry ingredients to send Simon back to the Shadow World.	The Magic of the Five
7	Troll Fast, Troll Furious	Paul Diamond	October 11, 2005	Sapphire falls for a skootz-racing senior, who is using her to build a superskoot.	Hair Over Heels
8	The Great Race	Jim Fisher; Jim Staahl	October 12, 2005	Mica returns and challenges Onyx to a skootz race rematch.	Hair Over Heels
9	Into the Woodz	Jan Strnad	October 13, 2005	The BFFL fight past mud monsters and stone ogres in the Haunted Woodz.	Hair Over Heels
10	The Dating Game	Martha Moran	October 14, 2005	Topaz wants to use spells to change herself but accidentally turns Jasper into a sneaky geek.	You Glow Girls
11	Mirror, Mirror	Michael Edens	October 17, 2005	Sapphire buys a magic mirror pendant, which elevates her ego.	You Glow Girls
12	Ruby's Rules of Partying	Phil Harnage (story); Brian Swenlin (script)	October 18, 2005	Disguised as a cute troll, Snarf makes a guest appearance at Jasper's party.	You Glow Girls
13	Forever Amber	Carter Crocker	October 19, 2005	Ruby loses an ancient ring that belonged to Amethyst's grandma.	A Hair A-Faire
14	Not-So-Good Old Days	Sean Roche	October 20, 2005	Simon casts Trollzopolis back into the Middle Ages.	A Hair A-Faire
15	Simply Simon	Brooks Wachtel	October 21, 2005	The girls come upon a way to sneak into King Simon's castle to stop Simon from sucking the magic out of Olde Worlde Trollzopolis.	A Hair A-Faire
16	The Tree and the Dragon	Cliff MacGillvray; Kelly Ward	October 24, 2005	Onyx and Topaz go on a midnight mission to unmask the mysterious missing Ancients.	Spellbound
17	Homecoming	Jay Abramowitz	October 25, 2005	Simon almost ruins homecoming.	Spellbound
18	A Dragon's Tale	John Ludin (story); John Loy (script)	October 26, 2005	Onyx returns to the Haunted Woodz, where she falls into Simon's hands and is transformed into a tree.	Spellbound
19	Field Trip	Len Uhley	October 27, 2005	Rock's jealousy of the girls' magic starts a foolish fight that strands the Trollz in the woods.	Boys Spell Trouble
20	The Day the Magic Died	Michael Edens	October 28, 2005	The guys sneak into the Amber Caves to acquire magic amber for themselves, but it is a trap set by Simon.	Boys Spell Trouble
21	Bringing Back the Magic	Richard Stanley	October 31, 2005	The Trollz must replace the Sacred Altar in order to restore their lost magic.	Boys Spell Trouble
22	New Girl in Town	Carter Crocker	November 1, 2005	There is a new girl on the block who tries to break up friendships.	Fuzzy Logic
23	When Good Girlz Go Bad	Carlos Aragon	November 2, 2005	Ruby wants to know why the Trollz are behaving so badly.	Fuzzy Logic
24	Boyz and Girlz Together	Don Gillies	November 3, 2005	Ruby travels to Simon's home to defeat him.	Fuzzy Logic
25	Where the Trollz Are	Craig Miller	November 4, 2005	Simon follows the Trollz to a tropical island.	Surfin' BFFL
26	Surf Monster a Go Go	John Loy	November 7, 2005	Sapphire has to confront her fears.	Surfin' BFFL
27	Krakatrolla Needs Some Java	Julia Lewald	November 8, 2005	The girls lose control of their tempers, causing Mt. Krakatrolla to erupt.	Surfin' BFFL

== Development and merchandising ==
During development of the property, DIC announced that the series would mostly see "tech"-related products to match the theme of the show. Fifty-two episodes were originally planned for the series.

In November 2004, DIC appointed BBC Worldwide as the UK license holder for the property.

== Broadcast ==
=== United States ===
The "Best Friends for Life" movie originally premiered on Disney Channel on August 27, 2005 (later reairing on Toon Disney in the next month) and then began its regular series run on the syndicated DIC Kids Network block in 2005.

The series later re-aired on the KOL Secret Slumber Party block on CBS beginning on September 16, 2006, and also aired on the KEWLopolis block for a short time until October 27, 2007. The series returned to CBS along with Horseland on February 5, 2011 as part of the Cookie Jar TV block until September 10, the same year. All references to DIC were replaced with Cookie Jar.

As of 2022, the series is currently streaming on Tubi.

=== International ===
In 2004, CBBC and TF1 acquired broadcast rights to the series for the United Kingdom and France, respectively, and also served as the local consumer products agents for the property.

In 2005, Nickelodeon acquired the exclusive cable, satellite and pay TV rights to the series in sixty-nine territories. The series aired on Nickelodeon channels in countries such as Spain, Holland, Belgium, Scandivania (including Denmark) Israel, Latin America, Asian territories (including Japan), India, Australia and New Zealand. The TV rights were picked up by Mediaset (Italy), RTVE (Spain), RTL Club (Belgium), Alter Channel (Greece), Televisa (Mexico), Saran (Turkey), RTÉ (Ireland), TVI (Poland) and TVNZ (New Zealand).

In Canada, YTV aired the "Best Friends for Life" film on September 4, 2005, but they did not air any other episodes.

In Ireland, the series aired on RTÉ Two from 28 September 2005 to 2006.

In the UK, the series re-aired on Pop Girl.

== Home media and streaming ==
In 2004, DIC signed a deal with Warner Home Video for the series in North America, where the episodes were combined into nine feature-length films. The deal with Warner Home Video was later extended to all major territories across the world under a five-year deal, except for the United Kingdom, France, and Portugal, where the series was released by BBC DVD, TF1 Video and LNK respectively.

These story-arc versions of the Trollz episodes were later released on Netflix, including the rest of the scrapped ones.

=== North America ===
The first two releases - "Best Friends for Life - The Movie" and "The Magic of the Five", were released in North America on September 6, 2005. Each film combined the story arcs of Episodes 1-3 and 4-6 respectively in a feature-length format, with additional footage not seen on the TV airings and replaced by "Spell Moments".

Two additional releases - "Hair Over Heels - The Movie" and "You Glow Girls - The Movie", which combined the arcs of Episodes 7-9 and 10-12 respectively, were planned for a Spring 2006 release but no such release occurred.

In 2007, NCircle Entertainment, who already held a then-new home video with DIC, had obtained the rights to release Trollz DVDs and reissued "Best Friends for Life - The Movie" and "The Magic of the Five - The Movie" on August 14 of the same year. Later in December, the previously-canceled third DVD release, "Hair Over Heels - The Movie", was finally released. NCircle planned to release "Hair Over Heels - The Movie" and "A Hair A-Fair - The Movie" in June 2008, the latter containing the story arcs of episodes 13-15, but both DVDs were never released.

=== International ===
Warner Home Video released "Best Friends for Life - The Movie" and "The Magic of the Five - The Movie" across the world in various regions beginning in 2006.

BBC DVD released "Best Friends for Life - The Movie" on DVD on February 6, 2006.

In France, TF1 Video released "La Magie des Cinq" in October 2009 through their TFOU Video label, which contained both "Best Friends for Life" and "The Magic of the Five" on one disc. The company IDP later released a 5-disc boxset containing all 27 episodes in November 2015.

== Lawsuit ==
In October 2007, DIC filed a $20 million lawsuit against DAM, stating that they had alleged claims of fraud in the inducement and negligent misrepresentation of the Trollz property and their licensing deal with the original troll dolls. DIC also claimed that DAM had failed to halt sales of counterfeit Troll Dolls appearing in the market. Shortly thereafter, DAM counter-sued DIC, claiming that DIC Entertainment financially misrepresented its ability to create and market a modern troll doll toy campaign and destroyed the image and goodwill of the doll.
