= Power of friendship =

Trope in media

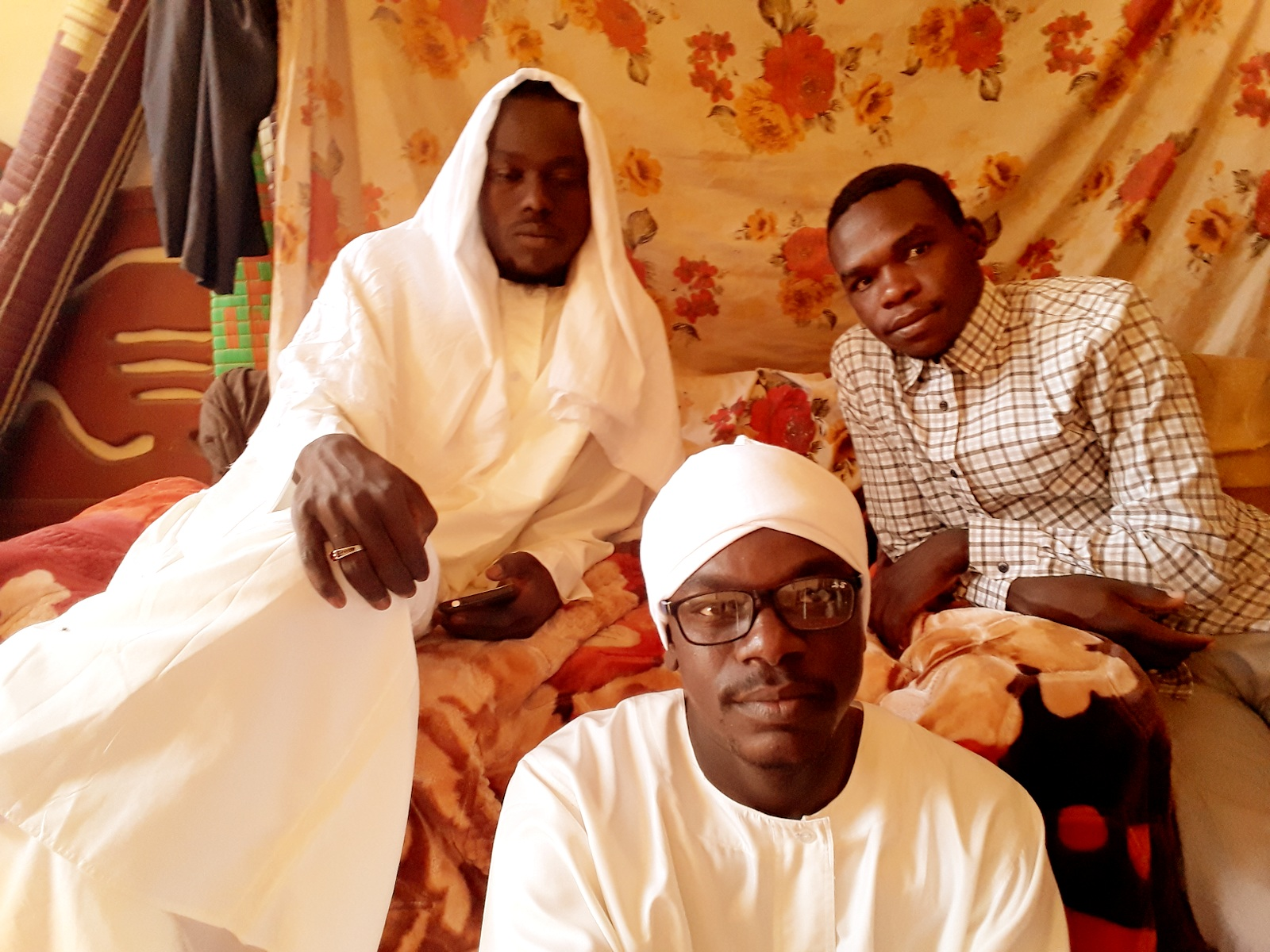
Friends spending time together

The power of friendship is a trope used in fiction to emphasize the importance of friendships. Its usage generally involves a group of friends pulling through a conflict through their shared bond. The power of friendship appears in multiple media, including My Little Pony and Lego Friends. The power of friendship is a prevalent narrative trope in television and other storytelling mediums, highlighting the transformative and redemptive potential of deep, interpersonal bonds. Central to this trope is the theme that the camaraderie, loyalty, and emotional support among friends can overcome seemingly insurmountable obstacles, catalyze personal growth, and foster collective strength. Frequently featured in genres such as fantasy, adventure, and drama, this motif serves as a poignant reminder of the intrinsic value of human connections. The trope often manifests through plotlines where protagonists, despite individual limitations, achieve remarkable feats by relying on their friends, or 'power'. Additionally, antagonistic characters are sometimes redeemed through the influence of newfound friendships, underscoring the profound impact of solidarity and mutual understanding.

== Examples ==
This trope may involve the usage of friendship as a magical force to drive away evil or some other force. It is a versatile storytelling device that enhances narratives by highlighting the transformative and redemptive potential of deep interpersonal bonds. It can be used to catalyze character development, resolve conflicts, drive plot progression, and evoke strong emotional reactions from audiences. This trope often conveys universal themes of love, loyalty, and solidarity, emphasizing the importance of human connections and the strength that comes from unity. Additionally, friendships provide humor and lighthearted moments, serving as comic relief and endearing characters to the audience. The trope can also contrast the benefits of friendship with the consequences of isolation, symbolizing larger societal or philosophical concepts and adding depth to the narrative. By incorporating the power of friendship, creators can craft compelling and emotionally resonant stories that celebrate the significance of human connections.

== Usage in media ==
- In the Disney animated film Bolt, Rhino the hamster fully believes in the power of friendship.
- Friendship is a major theme of the animated series Lego Friends: The Power of Friendship.
- Used in the animated series My Little Pony: Friendship is Magic, friendship is a magical force that is central to the plot.
- In the medical drama Grey's Anatomy the relationships among the doctors at Grey Sloan Memorial Hospital highlight how friendships can help individuals navigate personal and professional challenges, fostering resilience and growth.
