= Jordan McIntosh =

Canadian singer-songwriter

- Born: Jordan James McIntosh; December 20, 1995 (age 30); Ottawa, Ontario, Canada
- Origin: Carleton Place
- Genre: Country
- Occupation: Singer-songwriter
- Instrument: Guitar
- Years active: 2012–2017
- Labels: IROC, Big Star
- Website: https://www.jordanmcintosh.com

Jordan James McIntosh (born December 20, 1995) is a Canadian country singer-songwriter from Ottawa, Ontario. He has released a number of singles.

== Career ==
He was born to Greg and Julie McIntosh in Ottawa, Ontario. He has an older sister Melissa. He is presently based in Carleton Place.

McIntosh's first single, "Walk Away", was released in August 2012, followed by "Let Me Love You", "Grew Up in a Country Song", "That Girl" and "Story of My Life" which featured George Canyon. He also was featured on Canyon's Christmas song "Home for Christmas", which also included Aaron Pritchett and One More Girl.

McIntosh won Ottawa Idol (formerly called Kiwanis Idol) in 2011. McIntosh won the 2014 Country Music Association of Ontario award for Rising Star. He was a finalist in the Emerging Artist Showcase presented by SiriusXM Canada at the Boots and Hearts Music Festival.

== Discography ==
=== Studio albums ===
Title	Details
Steal Your Heart	Release date: April 15, 2016; Label: Big Star Recordings

=== Singles ===
Year	Single	Peak positions	Album	Writers
Year	Single	CAN Country	Album	Writers
2012	"Walk Away"	—	—N/a	
2013	"Let Me Love You"	47	Steal Your Heart	Heather Longstaffe, Georgia Thomas
2013	"Grew Up in a Country Song"	—	Steal Your Heart	Heather Longstaffe, Johnny Gates, Jordan McIntosh
2014	"That Girl"	—	Steal Your Heart	Maks Gabriel, Heather Longstaffe, Jordan McIntosh
2014	"Story of My Life" (featuring George Canyon)	—	Steal Your Heart	Julian Bunetta, Niall Horan, Zain Javadd Malik, Jamie Needle Liam Payne, John Henry Ryan, Harry Styles, Louis Tomlinson
2015	"All About the Girl"	—	Steal Your Heart	Victoria Banks, Forest Miller, Lindsay Rimes
2016	"Steal Your Heart"	—	Steal Your Heart	Danick Dupelle, Jordan McIntosh, Dave Thomson
2016	"Sunroof"	—	Steal Your Heart	Nathan Chapman, Sam Ellis
"—" denotes releases that did not chart

=== Music videos ===
Year	Single	Director
2012	"Walk Away"	
2013	"Grew Up in a Country Song"	Adrian Langley
2013	"Home for Christmas" (with George Canyon, Aaron Pritchett and One More Girl)	Stephen Lubig
2014	"That Girl"	
2014	"Story of My Life" (featuring George Canyon)	
2016	"Steal Your Heart"	

== Awards and nominations ==
Year	Association	Category	Result
2014	Country Music Association of Ontario	Rising Star	Won
2015	Canadian Country Music Association	Rising Star	Nominated
