= Alice, I Think (novel) =

2000 novel by Susan Juby

- First edition cover
- Author: Susan Juby
- Language: English
- Series: Alice Macleod
- Genre: Bildungsroman; Comic novel Young adult fiction
- Publisher: Thistledown Press
- Publication date: 28 April 2000
- Publication place: Canada
- Media type: Print
- Pages: 224 pp
- ISBN: 1-894345-12-6
- Followed by: Miss Smithers; Alice Macleod, Realist at Last

Alice, I Think is the first in a trilogy of comic novels written by Susan Juby. It was first published in 2000. It is set in Smithers, British Columbia and describes the struggle of a young woman, Alice Macleod, as she matures.

Alice, I Think was nominated for the Amazon/Books in Canada First Novel Award, and shortlisted for the Canadian Library Association Best Young Adult Novel Award.

The second and third volumes in the series are Miss Smithers and Alice MacLeod, Realist at Last. The series follows Alice as she moves from home schooling into near-mainstream high school and develops friendships and her sense of self. The series was made into a television series of the same name.

== See also ==
- Smithers, British Columbia
