= Alice, I Think (TV series) =

Canadian television sitcom

- Intertitle
- Starring: Carly McKillip; Rebecca Northan; Dan Payne; Connor Price; Lori Ann Triolo
- Country of origin: Canada
- No. of seasons: 1
- No. of episodes: 13

Production
- Production location: Langley, British Columbia
- Running time: 22 minutes

Original release
- Network: Comedy Network
- Release: May 26 – September 3, 2006

Alice, I Think is a Canadian television sitcom based on the 2000 Susan Juby book of the same name. Fifteen-year-old Alice is played by Carly McKillip. Alice's brother, MacGregor, is played by Connor Price. Alice's father, John, is played by Dan Payne, and her mother, Diane, is played by Rebecca Northan. Other characters include Marcus, Aubrey, Bob, Finn, Linda, Becky, Karen, Violet, Rosie and Geraldine. The show takes place in Smithers, British Columbia.

The show first aired on The Comedy Network on May 26, 2006. It formerly aired Fridays at 8pm ET/PT and Saturdays at 8:30pm ET/PT on The Comedy Network and aired on A-Channel on Mondays at 8:30pm ET/PT.
