= Don't Look Down (1998 film) =

- DVD cover
- Genre: Horror
- Written by: Gregory Goodell
- Directed by: Larry Shaw
- Starring: Megan Ward; Billy Burke
- Music by: J. Peter Robinson
- Country of origin: United States
- Original language: English

Production
- Producers: Ted Babcock; Wes Craven; Richard Fischoff; Marianne Maddalena; Ron McGee; Peter Sadowski; Robert M. Sertner; Erik Storey; Randy Sutter; Frank von Zerneck
- Cinematography: David Geddes
- Editor: Michael D. Ornstein
- Running time: 90 minutes
- Production companies: Craven-Maddalena Films; Von Zerneck Sertner Films

Original release
- Network: ABC
- Release: October 29, 1998

Don't Look Down is a 1998 American horror television film directed by Larry Shaw and produced by Wes Craven. It originally aired on October 29, 1998, on ABC. The film is about a woman who is struggling to cope with the death of her sister and joins a group for sufferers of acrophobia. However, it appears her problems may only be starting.

== Production ==
The film used locations in Vancouver and at the University of Northern British Columbia, Prince George in Canada.

== Plot ==
The film starts with Carla, her sister and her husband on a road trip in the cliffs. After a freak accident when Carla's sister falls from a cliff, Carla develops a fear of heights. In an effort to overcome her phobia she joins a support group, but when the other members of the group begin dying one by one, Carla begins to suspect she was the real target of the accident.

== Cast ==
- Megan Ward as Carla Engel
- Billy Burke as Mark Engel
- Terry Kinney as Dr. Paul Sadowski
