= Big Sky (One More Girl album) =

2009 studio album by One More Girl

Studio album by One More Girl
- Released: 6 October 2009
- Length: 44:52
- Label: EMI Music Canada
- Producer: Tom McKillip

Singles from Big Sky
- 1. "I Can Love Anyone" Released: October 20, 2008; 2. "Misery Loves Company" Released: March 16, 2009; 3. "When It Ain't Raining" Released: July 27, 2009; 4. "Tumblin' Tears" Released: December 7, 2009; 5. "The Day I Fall" Released: May 17, 2010

Big Sky is the debut studio album by Canadian country music group One More Girl. It was released on October 6, 2009 by EMI Music Canada. The album features songs written by Matraca Berg, Gretchen Wilson and Victoria Banks.

== Track listing ==
No.	Title	Writer(s)	Length
1.	"Big Sky"	Jim Marr, Wendy Page, Charlie Midnight	4:02
2.	"Tumblin' Tears"	Bruce Wallace, Rachel Proctor	3:39
3.	"When It Ain't Raining"	Victoria Banks, Gretchen Wilson	3:43
4.	"I Can Love Anyone"	Robin Lee Bruce, Trey Bruce, Joanna Janét	3:51
5.	"The Day I Fall"	Lisa Brokop, Patricia Conroy, Steve Fox	3:05
6.	"Misery Loves Company"	Matraca Berg, Sonny Tillis	3:20
7.	"Cry to Me"	Martin Sutton, Lulu, Billy Lawrie	4:44
8.	"I Wanna Know"	Angelo, Holly Lamar, Hillary Lindsey	2:56
9.	"Once Upon a Time"	Britt McKillip, Carly McKillip	3:24
10.	"Hold On to Me"	Ed Hill, Rissi Palmer, Shaye Smith	4:04
11.	"You Don't Know Me"	Banks	4:00
12.	"Angels" (featuring Aaron Pritchett)	Robbie Williams, Guy Chambers	4:03
Total length:			44:52

== Charts ==
=== Singles ===
Year	Single	Chart positions
Year	Single	CAN
2008	"I Can Love Anyone"	—
2009	"Misery Loves Company"	—
2009	"When It Ain't Rainin'"	86
2009	"Tumblin' Tears"	—
2010	"The Day I Fall"	—
"—" denotes releases that did not chart
