= Merry (surname) =

Merry is a surname. Notable persons with that surname include:

- Abdelkrim Merry (born 1955), Moroccan footballer
- Ann Brunton Merry (1769–1808), English actress
- Anthony Merry (1756–1835), British diplomat
- Arlette Merry (1918–2015), French actress and singer
- Cyril Merry (1911–1964), West Indies cricketer
- David Merry (cricketer) (1923–1944), Tobagonian cricketer and Royal Air Force officer
- David Merry (born 1945), British ambassador
- Diana Merry (fl.1970s–80s), American computer programmer
- Eleanor Merry (1873–1956), English poet, artist, musician and anthroposophist
- Emma Merry (born 1974), English discus thrower
- Frederick Carles Merry (1837–1900), American architect
- George Merry (disambiguation), several people
- Gus Merry (c.1888–1942), Welsh dual-code international rugby player
- Isabelle Merry (1907–2000), Australian Congregational minister and chaplain
- James Merry (Scottish politician) (1805–1877), MP for Falkirk Burghs 1859–74
- James R. Merry (1927–2001), Republican member of the Pennsylvania House of Representatives
- Katharine Merry (born 1974), English sprinter
- Mustafa Merry (born 1958), Moroccan footballer
- Nick Merry (born 1961/2), British businessman ad football club chairman
- Olivia Merry (born 1992), New Zealand field hockey player
- Peter Merry (born 1969), American author and public speaker
- Robert Merry (1755–1798), English poet and dilettante
- Robert W. Merry (born 1946), American journalist and author
- Sally Engle Merry (1944–2020), American anthropologist
- Thomas Merry (c.1605–1682), English landowner, mathematician and politician
- William Merry (disambiguation), several people

== See also ==
- Merry (disambiguation)
- Mery (disambiguation)
