= Mari =

Mari may refer to:

== Places ==
- Mari, Syria, an ancient Semitic city-state
- Mari, Paraíba, Brazil, a city
- Mari, Cyprus, a village
- Mari, Greece, a village, site of Marius, an ancient Greek town
- Mari, Iran (disambiguation)
- Mari, Punjab, Pakistan, a village and union council
- Mari, Abbottabad, Pakistan, a village
- Mari Autonomous Soviet Socialist Republic (1936–1990), an administrative division of the Soviet Union
- Mari Autonomous Oblast (1920–1936), an administrative division of the Soviet Union
- Mari (crater), an impact crater on Mars

== People and fictional characters ==
- Mari (given name), including a list of people and fictional characters with the name
- Mari (surname), a list of people
- Mari people, a Volga-Finnic people
- Abba Mari (c. 1250–c. 1306), Provençal rabbi
- Mari, Japanese novelist Mori Mari (1903–1987)
- Mari (musician), stage name of American Christian musician Mari Burelle-Valencia (born 1985)
- La Mari, stage name of Spanish singer María del Mar Rodríguez Carnero (born 1975)
- Marianne Steinbrecher (born 1983), Brazilian volleyball player known as Mari
- Annu Mari (born 1948), Indo–Japanese actress born Vasanthidevi Sheth
- Ayuki Mari, a supporting character in Kashimashi: Girl Meets Girl
- MARI, a character in the 2020 role-playing video game Omori

== Religion ==
- Mari (goddess), a Basque goddess
- Māri or Mariamman, a Hindu goddess in India
- Mari, an epithet for Korravai, a form of the Hindu goddess Durga
- Mari religion, the ethnic religion of the Mari people

== Other uses ==
- Mari language (disambiguation)
- Battle of Mari, a battle between the Mamluks of Egypt and the Armenians of Cilician Armenia in 1266
- Mari Petroleum, a Pakistani petroleum exploration and production company
- Mari (Noh play)
- Mari, a 2019 album by classical violinist Mari Samuelsen
- Mari, a 3D painting and texturing software by The Foundry Visionmongers
- Mari Lwyd, a Christmas folk custom in South Wales

== See also ==
- Mari Letters, or Mari tablets, ancient texts excavated at Mari, Syria
- Mari El, a republic in Russia
- Mary (disambiguation)
- Marri (disambiguation)
- Maari (disambiguation)
