= Meri =

Meri may refer to:

== Places ==
- Merì, town in Italy
- Meri, Cameroon, commune in Extrême-Nord region
- Meri, Iran (disambiguation)
- Meri, a village in Drăgăneşti Commune, Prahova County, Romania
- Meri, a village in Vedea Commune, Teleorman County, Romania

== Media ==
- Meri, term in shakuhachi music
- The Meri, novel by Maya Kaathryn Bohnhoff
- Meri, release title of La Mer (film) in Finland
- Meri (mythology), folk hero in Bororo mythology

== Names ==
- Meri (name)
- Mery (ancient Egyptian name), also spelled "Meri"

== Other uses ==
- Meri (political party), now-defunct political party in Israel
- Meri (spider), a genus of spiders in the family Sparassidae
- Merri (disambiguation)
- Merrie
- Mery (disambiguation)
- Merry (disambiguation)
