= Mariko (given name) =

- Pronunciation: Má-rí-ko
- Gender: Female

Origin
- Origin: Japanese
- Meaning: multiple different meanings depending on the kanji used
- Region of origin: Japan

Other names
- Related names: Mari; Marié

Mariko (まりこ, マリコ, 茉莉子, 真理子, 万里子, 眞里子, 万利子) is a feminine Japanese given name.

== Written forms in Japanese ==
The name Mariko can be written using various kanji characters, each of which has a different meaning, such as the following:

- 鞠子, "ball" + "child"
- 真理子, "truth" + "child"
- 万里子, "long distance" + "child"
- 茉莉子, "jasmine" + "child"
- 麻里子, "hemp" + "village (country house)" + "child"

The name can also be written in hiragana or katakana:

- まりこ (hiragana)
- マリコ (katakana)

== People ==
Notable people with the given name Mariko include:

- Mariko Adachi (足立 真梨子; born 1983), Japanese triathlete
- Mariko Asabuki (朝吹 真理子; born 1984), Japanese writer
- Mariko Bando (坂東 眞理子; born 1946), Japanese writer, critic, and former bureaucrat
- Mariko Daouda (born 1981), Ivorian football player
- Mariko Ebralidze (მარიკო ებრალიძე), a Georgian jazz singer
- Mariko Gotō (後藤 まりこ; born 1982), Japanese singer, lyricist, composer and actress
- Mariko Hasegawa (長谷川 眞理子; born 1952), Japanese zoologist and anthropologist
- Mariko Hayashi (林 真理子; born 1954), Japanese writer
- Mariko Hill (born 1995) Hong Kong cricketer
- Mariko Honda (本多 真梨子), Japanese voice actress
- Mariko Iwadate (岩館 真理子; born 1957), Japanese manga artist
- Mariko Kaga (加賀 まりこ; born 1943), Japanese actress
- Mariko Kawana (川奈 まり子; born 1967), Japanese AV idol and pink film actress
- Mariko Kihara (木原 万莉子; born 1997), Japanese figure skater
- Mariko Koike (小池 真理子; born 1952), Japanese novelist
- Mariko Kouda (國府田 マリ子; born 1969), Japanese actress, voice actress, J-pop singer and radio personality
- Mariko Kusumoto (born 1967), Japanese artist
- Mariko Masubuchi (増淵 まり子; born 1980), Japanese softball player
- Mariko Miyagi (宮城 まり子; 1927–2020), Japanese actress, singer, and advocate for children with disabilities
- Mariko Mori (森 万里子; born 1967), Japanese video and photographic artist
- Mariko Mori (volleyball) (森 万里子; born 1981), Japanese volleyball player
- Mariko Morimoto (森本 麻里子; born 1995), Japanese triple jumper
- Mariko Nagai (born 1974), Japanese-born poet and writer who writes in English
- Mariko Nanba, (真理子), a Japanese video game composer
- Mariko Ōhara (大原 まり子; born 1959), Japanese science fiction writer
- Mariko Oi (大井 真理子; born 1981), Japanese bilingual journalist
- Mariko Okada (岡田 茉莉子; born 1933), Japanese stage and film actress
- Mariko Okamoto (岡本 眞理子; born 1951), Japanese volleyball player and Olympic champion
- Mariko Okubo (大久保 麻梨子; born 1984), Japanese model and actress
- Mariko Ooe (大江 麻理子; born 1978), Japanese newsroom announcer
- Mariko Peters (born 1969) Dutch politician and civil servant as well as lawyer
- Mariko Sakai (酒井 麻里子; born 1990), Japanese synchronized swimmer
- Mariko Sanjo (三条 万里子; born 1933), Japanese modern dancer, choreographer and director
- Mariko Seyama (脊山 麻理子; born 1980), Japanese announcer and former model
- Mariko Shiga (志賀 真理子; 1969–1989), Japanese idol star and voice actress
- Mariko Shimizu (マリコ), a Japanese novelist
- Mariko Shinoda (篠田 麻里子; born 1986), Japanese singer, actress and fashion model
- Mariko Silver, American president and CEO of Lincoln Center for the Performing Arts
- Mariko Suga (菅 真理子; born 1953), Japanese wife of the former Prime Minister of Japan, Yoshihide Suga
- Mariko Suzuki (鈴木 麻里子; born 1970), Japanese voice actress
- Mariko Takahashi (singer) (高橋 真梨子; born 1949), Japanese singer
- Mariko Takahashi (model and actress) (高橋 マリ子; born 1984), Japanese model and actress
- Mariko Takahashi (gymnast) (高橋 麻理子; born 1988), Japanese gymnast
- Mariko Takamura (高村 真理子; 1958–2006), Japanese cultural icon for the deaf and hard of hearing
- Mariko Tamaki (born 1975), Canadian artist and writer
- Mariko Tanaka (田中 真理子; born 1993), Japanese professional footballer
- Mariko Tone (刀根 麻理子; born 1962), Japanese singer, actor and essayist
- Mariko Tsutsui (筒井 真理子; born 1960), Japanese actress
- Mariko Umeda (梅田 麻里子; 1967–1997), Japanese female professional wrestler
- Mariko Yamada (山田 真理子; born 1950), Japanese-American social worker
- Mariko Yamamoto (山本 万里子; born 1983), Japanese former cricketer
- Mariko Yoshida (吉田 万里子; born 1970), Japanese retired professional wrestler
- Mariko Yoshida (volleyball) (吉田 真理子; born 1954), Japanese volleyball player and Olympic champion
- Mariko Yoshikawa (吉川 真理子; born 1951), Japanese fencer
- Tetsuya Mariko (真利子 哲也; born 1981), Japanese filmmaker

== Fictional characters ==
Notable fictional characters with the given name Mariko include:

- Mariko, a character in the newspaper and webcomic strip Piled Higher and Deeper
- Mariko Konjo, a character in the anime and manga series Ranma ½
- Mariko Kurama, a supporting character of the anime series Elfen Lied
- Mariko "Marie" Kusumi, a supporting character in Persona 4
- Mariko Shinobu, a character in the anime and manga series Onii-sama e...
- Mariko Takeda, a fictional character from the comic book series W.I.T.C.H
- Mariko Tanaka, a character in the video game Wing Commander II: Vengeance of the Kilrathi
- Mariko Toda, a character in the novel Shōgun
- Mariko Uehara, a character from the television drama Nobuta wo Produce
- Mariko Uki, a character in the Japanese horror movie Ju-on: The Grudge
- Mariko Yashida, a character that appears in various comic books published by Marvel Comics
