= Maari =

Maari may refer to:

- Maari (film), a 2015 Indian Tamil-language action-comedy film by Balaji Mohan
  - Maari (soundtrack), the soundtrack album for the 2015 film
  - Maari 2, its 2018 sequel
- Maari (TV series), a 2022 Indian Tamil-language television series
- Määri, a village in northeastern Estonia

== See also ==
- Mari (disambiguation)
