= Tenchi the Movie 2: The Daughter of Darkness =

- North American release cover
- Directed by: Tetsu Kimura
- Written by: Nahoko Hasegawa
- Based on: Tenchi Muyo! by Masaki Kajishima
- Starring: Masami Kikuchi; Ai Orikasa; Yumi Takada; Chisa Yokoyama; Yuko Mizutani; Yuri Amano; Yuko Kobayashi; Junko Iwao; Yō Inoue
- Edited by: Masashi Furukawa
- Music by: Kow Otani
- Production companies: Anime International Company; Pioneer LDC
- Distributed by: Toei Company (Japan); Funimation (North America); Madman Entertainment (Australia & New Zealand); MVM Films (United Kingdom)
- Release date: August 2, 1997
- Running time: 65 minutes
- Country: Japan
- Language: Japanese

Tenchi the Movie 2: Daughter of Darkness, known in Japan as Tenchi Muyō! Midsummer's Eve (天地無用!真夏のイヴ, Tenchi Muyō! Manatsu no Ibu) in Japan is the second of three films set in the Tenchi Muyo! multi-verse directed by Tetsu Kimura and written by Nahoko Hasegawa. The film was released in Japan on August 2, 1997, as a double feature, along with Slayers Great. The film was later released in North America on Laserdisc on 31 March 1998 and DVD on August 8, 1998. Tenchi Muyo! Daughter of Darkness was later re-released along with Tenchi the Movie: Tenchi Muyo in Love and Tenchi Forever! The Movie in a collectors' pack. Funimation announced distribution of the film, along with several other Tenchi properties, on July 2, 2010, at Anime Expo.

== Plot ==
Long ago, a young Prince Yosho met a young demon girl, named Yuzuha. Attracted to Yosho, two agreed to meet to play together during the annual Startica celebration on Jurai; she was driven away by the palace guards and she hated Yosho for it. 700 years later, Yuzuha wakes up within the underworld and discovers that Yosho is alive and on Earth, celebrating Christmas with the family and the ladies that had gathered around Tenchi. She believes Tenchi Masaki is a charmer due to the fact he is surrounded by so many girls; she decides to send Tenchi a present. She obtains a lock of Tenchi's hair and takes a piece of her own to create a girl that's part human, Juraian and demon to entertain her mischievous nature.

Six months later during summer, while walking down the steps of the shrine, Tenchi meets a teenage girl named Mayuka, who calls him daddy. Tenchi takes the girl back to the house where she introduces herself as Tenchi's daughter, shocking everyone within the household. Ryoko felt threatened by Mayuka and denied her paternity to Tenchi. She attacks Mayuka and demands real answers by threatening her with an energy sword, but Mayuka defends herself by summoning a faux-Lighthawk Sword; the situation was stopped by Katsuhito. In the midst of the confusion, Washu took a sample of her hair to confirm half her DNA belongs to Tenchi; Mayuka is genetically Tenchi's daughter.

The Masaki household tries to make sense of how Mayuka came to be and the most popular theory is that she's from the future. Unknown to the rest of group, Mayuka was secretly being manipulated by Yuzuha for her own enjoyment. Whenever the crew was too preoccupied to notice Tenchi or Mayuka, Yuzuha uses those moments to control Mayuka and have her do things that makes her questionable. At one point, Mayuka takes Tenchi away from the gang and tries to transport him to Yuzuha. Before she is able to, Ryoko breaks the trance and carries Mayuka away. Katsuhito finds Mayuka and brings her back to the house, where she once again tries to bring Tenchi to Yuzuha; Katsuhito and Washu interfered and Mayuka runs off into the forest.

Taking Mayuka back to the underworld, Yuzuha erases Mayuka's memories and takes Sasami hostage, which leads Tenchi and Ryoko enter Yuzuha's world to save them; Tenchi was warned he can't use his Juraian powers there, giving Yuzuha the advantage. Losing all sense of who she was and turned into a monster, Mayuka attacks Ryoko and injures her; she then attacks Tenchi but after hearing Sasami telling her that the whole group loves her, she breaks free of Yuzuha's control and assaults her. Yuzuha kills Mayuka for her betrayal and transforms into a giant dark creature, but Ayeka appears and gives Tenchi a branch from the Tree of Light to utilize his Juraian powers. He defeats Yuzuha and they returned home with the remains of Mayuka, a red crystal. Washu is able to resurrect Mayuka, but she wanted everyone's consent to forward the project. Although Ryoko was against Mayuka, she also welcomed the idea and promise to train her in her ways. It is seen at the ending of the story, Mayuka's crystal was used to bring her back and by next Christmas, Mayuka is returned to the crew as an infant and to be raised by the Masaki family.

== Cast ==
Role	Japanese actor	American actor
Tenchi Masaki	Masami Kikuchi	Matt K. Miller
Ryoko	Ai Orikasa	Petrea Burchard
Ayeka	Yumi Takada	Jennifer Darling
Sasami	Chisa Yokoyama	Sherry Lynn
Mihoshi	Yūko Mizutani	Rebecca Forstadt
Kiyone	Yuri Amano	Wendee Lee
Washu	Yuko Kobayashi	Kate T. Vogt
Katsuhito Masaki and Nobuyuki Masaki	Takeshi Aono	Bob Papenbrook
Mayuka	Junko Iwao	Julie Maddalena
Yuzuha	Yō Inoue	Barbara Goodson

== Reception ==
Jared Wietbrock of Mania reviewed the film. While saying that Daughter of Darkness was a "fun movie", he commented on the film being "too short" and "rushed". He also said he still didn't know what Yuzuha's problem was claiming "for all I know she was just bored and picked Tenchi out of the blue to be her entertainment". Despite this Wietbrock gave the film an A and called the film a keeper and said no Tenchi fan should be without it. Marc of Akemi's Anime World said the film was "[...] another confusing addition to the scattershot mess that passes for continuity in the series". He also said "[...] has the usual combination of touching sentiment, silly comedy, wild plot, and plenty of action". Marc praised both of Mayuka's voice actors, "[...] she sounds as sweet and naive as she looks, and you just can't help but like her".

== Music ==
The music for the film was composed by Kow Otani and theme song of the movie is "Manatsu no Eve" (真夏のイヴ, Midsummer's Eve), which is performed by Mariko Nagai. In Japan, the soundtrack was released a few weeks before the film's release; however, it failed to chart on the Oricon.
