= Mery =

Mery or Méry may refer to:

== Places ==
- Méry, section of town Esneux, Belgium
- Méry, Chambéry, Savoie department, Auvergne-Rhône-Alpes region, France
- Méry-la-Bataille, Oise department, France
- Méry-Bissières-en-Auge, Calvados department, Normandy region, France
- Méry-Corbon, Calvados department, Normandy region, France
- Méry-sur-Cher, Cher department, Centre-Val de Loire region, France
- Méry-sur-Marne, Seine-et-Marne department, Île-de-France region, France
- Méry-sur-Oise, Val-d'Oise department, Île-de-France, France
- Méry-sur-Seine, Aube department, France
- Méry-Prémecy, Marne department, France
- Saint-Méry, Seine-et-Marne department, Île-de-France region, France

== People with the name Mery ==
- Mery (ancient Egyptian name)
- Mery (High Priest of Amun) from the time of Amenhotep II (18th Dynasty)
- Mery Andrade (born 1975), American basketball player and coach
- Mery Godigna Collet (born 1959), Venezuelan artist, writer, philanthropist and environmental advocate
- Mery Valencia de Ortiz (born 1953), also known as "La Señora", former Colombian drug trafficker
- Mery Zamora (born 1972), Ecuadorian syndicalist leader, teacher, and politician

== People with the name Méry ==
=== Given name ===
- Méry Laurent (Anne Rose Suzanne Louviot, 1849-1900), courtesan and muse of several Parisian artists

=== Surname ===
- Andrée Méry (1876–1968), French actress, playwright and translator
- Gaston Méry (1866–1909), French author, translator and journalist
- Gaston Méry (explorer) (1844–1897), French explorer
- Hubert Beuve-Méry (1902–1989), collaborator with Vichy regime at the beginning of World War II
- Huon de Méry (fl. 1200–1250), author of Li Tournoiemenz Anticrit
- Jean Méry (1645–1722), French anatomist and surgeon
- Jean-Claude Méry (1942–1999), French politician
- Joseph Méry (1797–1866), French writer
- Rita Méry (born 1984), Hungarian football striker currently playing in the Hungarian First Division for MTK Hungária
- Tomáš Méry (born 1990), Slovak professional ice hockey player

== See also ==
- Turcat-Méry, a French motor manufacturer 1899–1928
- Mary (disambiguation)
- Meri (disambiguation)
- Merri (disambiguation)
- Merrie
- Merry (disambiguation)
