= Junko Iwao =

Japanese voice actress and singer (born 1970)

- 岩男 潤子
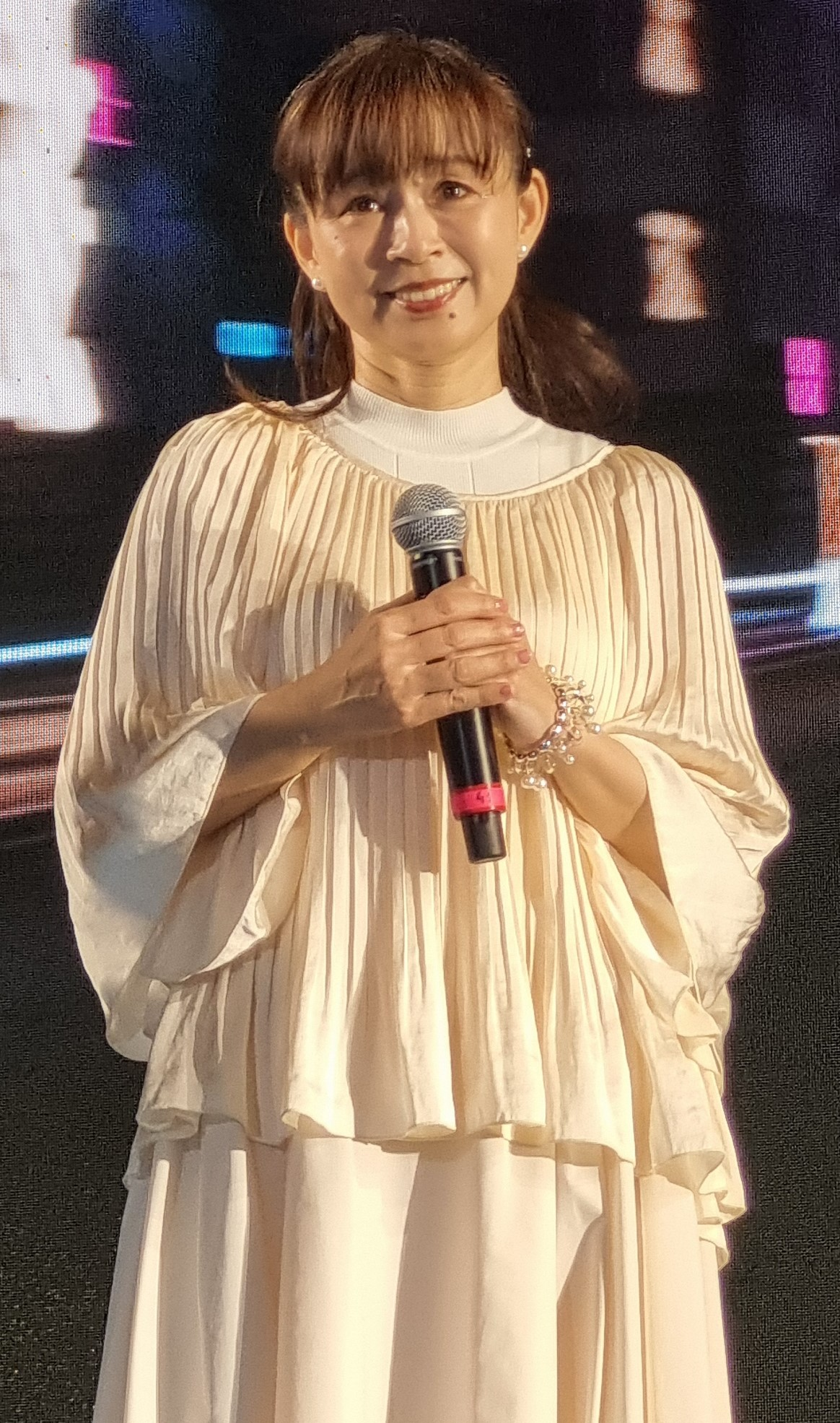
- Junko Iwao at Anime Summit 2024 in Brasília, Brazil
- Born: February 18, 1970 (age 56); Beppu, Ōita Prefecture, Japan
- Occupations: Voice actress; singer
- Years active: 1994–present
- Agent: J. Island
- Notable work: Cardcaptor Sakura as Tomoyo Daidouji; Ceres, Celestial Legend as Ceres; Perfect Blue as Mima Kirigoe
- Spouse: Harukichi Yamamoto (1998–2007)

Japanese name
- Kanji: 岩男 潤子
- Hiragana: いわお じゅんこ
- Katakana: イワオ ジュンコ
Transcriptions
- Romanization: Iwao Junko
- Website: www.iwaojunko.com

Junko Iwao (岩男 潤子, Iwao Junko; born February 18, 1970 in Beppu, Ōita) is a Japanese voice actress and singer. Her most notable role is in Cardcaptor Sakura, providing the voice to Sakura's best friend and cousin, Tomoyo Daidōji. She also voiced lead character Mima Kirigoe in Perfect Blue, Ceres in Ceres, Celestial Legend, and Kikyo in Hunter x Hunter. In video games, she voiced Pai Chan in Virtua Fighter, Carole Pepper in Honkai Impact 3rd, Mint in Tales of Phantasia and Serika in To Heart.

== Filmography ==
=== Anime ===
Year	Series	Role	Notes	Source
1994	Montana Jones	Melissa	Debut role	
1994	Goal FH	Minako Honjo		
1994–95	New Cutey Honey	Natsuko	OVA	
1994	Chō Kuse ni Narisō	Chitose Morino		
1994	Macross 7	Sally Saint Ford		
1994	Captain Tsubasa J	Aoba Yayoi, Mori		
1994	Key the Metal Idol	Tokiko "Key" Mima		
1995	Chibi Maruko-chan	Kenta Hasegawa		
1995–96	Macross 7 Plus	Hennessy, Sally Saint Ford	OAV	
1995	Elementalors	Kana	OVA	
1995	Wedding Peach	Manami	Ep. 21	
1995	Mojacko	Miki Kawano/Kouno		
1995	Neon Genesis Evangelion	Hikari Horaki		
1995	Saint Tail	Kyoko		
1995	Super Atragon	Annette	OAV	
1995	Macross 7 Encore	Sally Saint Ford	OAV	
1995	Golden Boy	Employee B		
1996	Magic User's Club	Akane Aikawa	OVA	
1996	X	Kotori Monō		
1996	Harley Spiny	Risuko		
1996	Garzey's Wing	Rumiko		
1996–97	Variable Geo	Chiho Masuda	OAV	
1997	Perfect Blue	Mima Kirigoe		
1997	Hyper Speed GranDoll	Hikaru Amagi	OVA	
1997	Haunted Junction	Reiko		
1997	Shinkai Densetsu Meremanoid	Laila		
1997	Vampire Princess Miyu	Riri Sone	TV series, Ep. 20	
1998–2000	Cardcaptor Sakura	Tomoyo Daidouji	Also movies	
1998	Ojarumaru	Kabiko, Keeko		
1998	Devil Lady	Jun Fudo, Devil Lady		
1999	Samurai X: Trust & Betrayal	Tomoe Yukishiro, Ikuko Katsu		
1999	Betterman	Sakura		
1999	To Heart	Serika Kurusugawa, Ayaka Kurusugawa		
1999	Magic User's Club	Akane Aikawa	TV series	
1999	Melty Lancer	Sakuya Lansaihe		
2000	Mon Colle Knights	Mori wo itsukushimu tenshi	Ep. 34, 50-51	
2000	Gate Keepers	Francine Allumage		
2000	Ceres, Celestial Legend	Ceres		
2004	My-HiME	Akane Higurashi		
2004	To Heart Remember My Memories	Serika Kurusugawa		
2004	Blue Seed	Valencia Tachibana	OAV	
2004	Tales of Phantasia	Mint Adnade		
2005	Majime ni Fumajime: Kaiketsu Zorori	Najo		
2005	Princess Minerva	Tua		
2005	My-Otome	Akane Soire		
2005	Mushishi	Setsu	Ep. 14	
2006	Yoshimune	Hime		
2006	Super Robot Wars Original Generation: Divine Wars	Refina		
2006–7	Jigoku Shōjo Futakomori	Honami Senwaki		
2011	Puella Magi Madoka Magica	Kazuko Saotome		
2011	Katte ni Kaizō	Yoshiko-sensei, Kaizō (young)	OVA	
2011	Working'!!	Haruna Otoo		
2011	Hunter x Hunter	Kikyo Zoldyck		
2012	Place to Place	Kikue Sakuragawa		
2013	Tamako Market	Sayuri Yumoto		
2013	Love, Chunibyo & Other Delusions -Heart Throb-	Rikka's mother		
	Anpanman	Yakisobakasu, Waffle-chan		
	Case Closed	Noriko Imai	Ep. 383	
2015	Working!!!	Haruna Otoo		
2016	Maho Girls PreCure!	Lilia		
2017	Onihei Hankachō	Hisae Hasegawa		
2018	Cardcaptor Sakura: Clear Card	Tomoyo Daidouji		

=== Film ===
Year	Series	Role	Notes	Source
1997	Evangelion: Death and Rebirth	Hikari Horaki		
1997	Tenchi the Movie 2: The Daughter of Darkness	Mayuka		
2018	Love, Chunibyo & Other Delusions! Take on Me	Rikka's Mother		

=== Overseas dubbing ===
Year	Series	Role	Notes	Source
	The Brave Little Toaster	Chris		
	Teenage Mutant Ninja Turtles	Princess Mallory		

=== Video games ===
Year	Series	Role	Notes	Source
1991	Langrisser IV	Schelfaniel		
1993	Samurai Shodown	Tokihime-Tenhime		
1993	Virtua Fighter series	Pai Chan		
1995	Tales series	Mint Adnade	Phantasia, Abyss	
1995	Eve Burst Error	Marina Hojo	Sega Saturn; Also Eve The Lost One	
1995	Galaxy Fraulein Yuna 2	Rui Maria Marcie		
1996	Neon Genesis Evangelion video games	Hikari Horaki		
1996	Lightning Legend: Daigo no Daibouken	Mayu Usaka		
1996	Meltylancer	Sakuya	Multiple platforms	
1996	NOeL	Emi Sanokura	Also Noel 3	
1996	True Love Story 2	Kodachi Kazama		
1997	To Heart	Serika Kurusugawa, Ayaka Kurusugawa		
1997	Galaxy Fraulein Yuna 3: Lightning Angel	Rui Maria Marcie		
1997	Hyper Speed GranDoll	Hikaru Tenju		
1997	Power Dolls 2: Detachment of Limited Line Service	Alice Knox	PlayStation	
1998	Blaze and Blade: Eternal Quest	Female warrior, thief		
1998	Mitsumete Knight	Lesley Lopicana	Also R	
1998	Dragon Force II	Tilis	Sega Saturn	
1998	Princess Quest	Peppy		
1998	Sequence Palladium	Elemi	Windows version	
1999	Cardcaptor Sakura video games	Tomoyo Daidouji		
1999	Gate Keepers	Francine Allumage		
2000	Armored Core 2	Nell Aulter		
2000	Grandia II	Tio		
2003	Lineage II	Tutorial voice		
2005	Mai-HiME: Unmei no Keitōju	Akane Higurashi		
2006	Summon Night 4	Coral		
2007	Super Robot Wars: Original Generations series	Lefina Enfield		
2012	Puella Magi Madoka Magica Portable	Kazuko Saotome	PSP	
	My-Otome series	Akane Sowaru		
2020	Honkai Impact 3	Carole	Multiple Platform	
	Post-Houkai Odyssey DLC	Carole Pepper		

=== Drama CDs ===
Year	Series	Role	Notes	Source

- Boxer Wa Inu Ni Naru series 2: Doctor Wa Inu wo Kau (Mihou)

== Discography ==
=== Albums ===
List of albums, with selected chart positions
Release date	Title	Catalogue number (Japan)	Oricon	
Release date	Title	Catalogue number (Japan)	Peak position	Weeks charted
1995-04-05	Hajimemashite (はじめまして, Nice to meet you)	PCCG-00335		
1995-11-01	18-Ban machi no kiseki (18番街の奇跡, 18th Street Miracle)	PCCG-00349		
1996-07-19	Entrance	PCCA-00978		
1997-07-07	Alive	PCCG-00496		
1997-09-19	Kimochi	PCCG-00417		
1999-03-03	Favorite Songs	PCCG-00472		
1998-02-18	Iwao Junko Concert Kimochi in Tokyo International Forum (岩男潤子コンサート kimochi in 東京国際フォーラム)	PCCG-00442		
1999-11-07	Appear	PCCA-01390		
2000-12-06	Canary	PCCA-01485		
2011-10-26	Anison Acoustics	JICD-008	208	1
2013-01-23	Anison A to Z	JICD-009	133	1
2013-07-07	Yasashi-sa no Tane (やさしさの種子)	JICD-010	161	2
2014-07-23	Voice	JICD-011	280	1
