= Marie (Japanese given name) =

- Pronunciation: Japanese: [maɾie]
- Gender: Female

Origin
- Origin: Japanese
- Meaning: different meanings depending on the kanji
- Region of origin: Japanese

Other names
- Related names: Mari; Mariko

Marie or Marié (まりえ、マリエ) is a feminine Japanese given name. Occasionally the "e" is written with an acute accent or other diacritic to signify that it is pronounced, and to distinguish it from the etymologically unrelated French and English name Marie.

== Written forms ==
Marie can be written using different kanji characters, among others:

- 真理恵, "truth, blessing"
- 万里江, "long distance, big river"
- 真理絵, "truth, picture"
- 万里絵, "long distance, picture"
- 麻理恵, "hemp, reason, blessing"

The name can also be written partially or fully in hiragana or katakana.

== People ==
- Marie Arai (荒井 万里絵; born 1981), Japanese figure skater
- Marié Digby (born 1983), American musician, singer, and songwriter
- Marie Helvin (born 1952), Japanese–American model
- Marie Iitoyo (飯豊 万理江; born 1998), Japanese model and actress
- Marie Kai (甲斐 まり恵; born 1980), Japanese actress
- Marie Kondo (近藤 麻理恵; born 1985), Japanese author, organizing consultant, and television presenter
- Marie Miyake (三宅 麻理恵; born 1985), Japanese voice actress
- Marie Mizuno (水野 麻里絵), Japanese voice actress
- Marie Yamaguchi (山口 真理恵; born 1989), Japanese rugby sevens player
- Marie Ueda (植田 真梨恵; born 1990), Japanese singer and songwriter

== Fictional characters ==
- Marie Yamano (山野 真理絵), mother of Van Yamano, a character in the game and anime series Little Battlers Experience
