= Julie Maddalena =

American voice actress

- Occupation: Voice actress
- Years active: 1984–present

Julia Maddalena is an American voice actress who has worked on dubs of Japanese anime, cartoons, and video games.

== Career ==
Some of her major voice roles are Silvia Maruyama from Ground Defense Force! Mao-chan, Arusu from Tweeny Witches, Hikaru Shidou from Magic Knight Rayearth, Tamaki Nakamura from Samurai Girl: Real Bout High School, Sakuya Kumashiro from Tenchi in Tokyo, and Cotton from the anime film Oblivion Island: Haruka and the Magic Mirror. Early in her acting career, she portrayed Rachel in the 1984 movie adaptation of Children of the Corn.

== Filmography ==
=== Anime ===
- 3×3 Eyes – Ken-Ken (Streamline Dub)
- Battle Athletes Victory – Tanya Natdhipytadd
- Black Jack – Pinoko (Ep. 1–6)
- Cardcaptor Sakura Movie 2: The Sealed Card – Meiling Li
- Chobits – Yumi Omura
- Crayon Shin-chan – Mitsy Nohara (Phuuz dub)
- Cowboy Bebop – Hologram
- Digimon Adventure/Digimon Adventure 02 – Satoe Tachikawa
- El-Hazard series – Ura
- Fight! Iczer 1 – Mami
- Figure 17 – Sakura Ibaragi
- Fushigi Yûgi – Yurein, Shoka (Eikoden)
- Gate Keepers – Kazu
- Ghost in the Shell: Stand Alone Complex – Tachikoma
- Giant Robo – Sunny the Magician (Animaze dub)
- Immortal Grand Prix – Himawari Aoi/Jesse Martin (microseries & TV series), Luca (microseries)
- Kurogane Communication – Haruka
- Kuromukuro – Elizabeth Butler
- Lily C.A.T. – Nancy
- Love Hina – Sarah McDougall
- Magic Knight Rayearth - Hikaru Shidou
- Mao-chan – Silvia
- Mobile Suit Gundam F91 – Reese Arno
- Oblivion Island: Haruka and the Magic Mirror – Cotton
- Overman King Gainer – Cona Madaya
- Please Twins! – Yuka Yashiro
- Phantom Quest Corp. – Makiko Mizuno
- Saber Marionette J Again – Lime
- Saint Tail – Sayaka Shinomiya
- Samurai Girl Real Bout High School – Tamaki Nakamura
- Someday's Dreamers – Runa
- Super Pig – Super Pig/Kassie Carlen
- Teknoman – Tina Corman
- Tenchi in Tokyo – Sakuya Kumashiro, Matori
- Tenchi Muyo! GXP – Hakuren, Mrs. Yamada
- Tenchi the Movie 2: The Daughter of Darkness – Mayuka
- Trigun – Jessica
- Tweeny Witches – Arusu
- Vandread – Dita Liebely
- WXIII: Patlabor the Movie 3 – Hitomi Misaki
- Wild Arms – Mirabelle Graceland
- Witch Hunter Robin – Methuselah (Young)
- Wolf's Rain – Mew
- Ys – Lilia
- The Adventures of Pinocchio – Pinocchio

=== Animation ===
- Ever After High – Blondie Lockes, Cheshire Cat, Jillian Beanstalk
- Deer Squad – Professor Scratch
- Secret Millionaires Club – Elena
- Monster High – Venus McFlytrap, Robecca Steam
- The Toy Warrior – Princess Sherbet
- The Power of Animals – Emma
- The Twilight Fairies – Sabrina Cox, additional voices
- LeapFrog – Tad (2 DVDs)

=== Live action ===
- Adventures in Voice Acting – Herself
- Masked Rider – Fact (voice)
- Mighty Morphin Power Rangers – Arachnofiend (voice, uncredited)
- Power Rangers in Space, Power Rangers Lost Galaxy – D.E.C.A. (voice, credited as Julie Kliewer in PRiS)
- Children of the Corn – Rachel Colby (debut role)

=== Film ===
- NiNoKuni – Dandy (Netflix dub)

=== Video games ===
- .hack series – Ryoko Terajima
- Akiba's Trip: Hellbound & Debriefed – Additional voices
- Galerians – Lilia Pascalle
- Ghost in the Shell – Fuchikoma
- Nier: Automata – Additional voices
- Pac-Man and the Ghostly Adventures – Pinky
- Star Ocean: First Departure – Ilia Silvestri
