= Merri =

Merri may refer to:

== People ==
- Merri Sue Carter (born 1964), American astronomer
- Merri Dee (1936–2022), American journalist and philanthropist
- Merri Franquin (1848–1934), French trumpeter
- Merri Rose (born 1955), Australian politician

== Places ==
- Merri, Orne, France
- Merri Creek, Australia
- Merri railway station, Victoria, Australia
- Merri River, Australia
- Saint-Merri, Paris, France

== Other ==
- Merri Merri, Albanian song

== See also ==
- Meri (disambiguation)
- Merri (disambiguation)
- Merrie
- Mery (disambiguation)
- Merry (disambiguation)
