= Mobile disc jockey =

Disc jockeys that tour with portable sound, lighting, and video systems

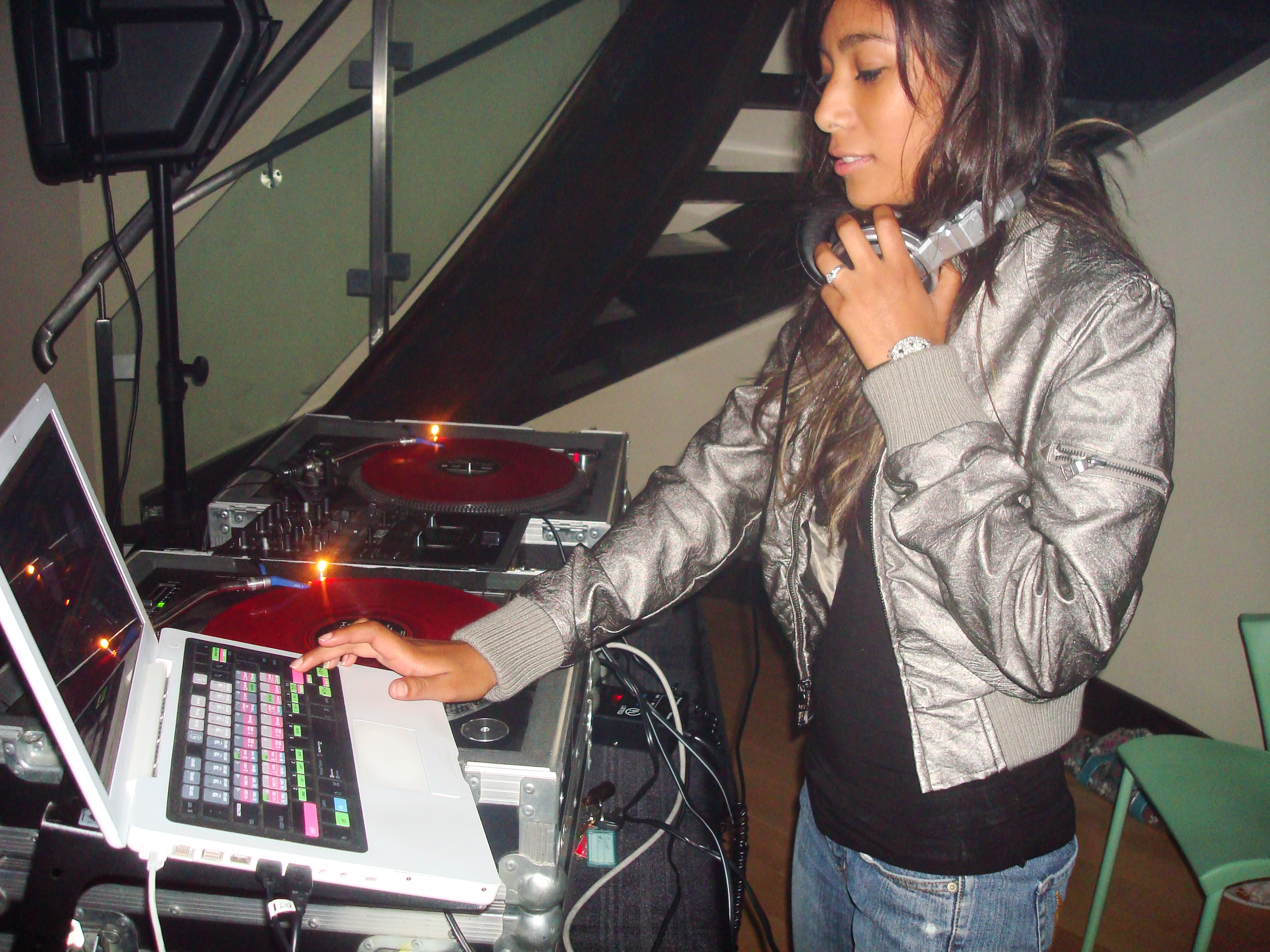
Mobile disc jockey

Mobile disc jockeys (also known as mobile DJs or mobile discos) are disc jockeys that tour with portable sound, lighting, and video systems. They play music for a targeted audience from a collection of pre-recorded music using vinyl records, cassettes, CDs, or digital music formats such as USB flash drives or laptop computers.

Mobile DJs perform at a variety of events including wedding receptions, Bar and Bat Mitzvah receptions, company parties, school dances, anniversaries, and birthday parties. They also perform in public at taverns, nightclubs, and block parties.

Business models for mobile disc jockeys include full-time, part-time, multi-operator, and single-operator companies. The first mobile DJ was in Boston Lincolnshire in the UK when Ron Diggins, a radio engineer created a twin 78rpm turntable console he called the 'Diggola' to entertain Land Army girls at local village hall dances in 1947. https://www.bbc.co.uk/news/articles/c05nnq83000o

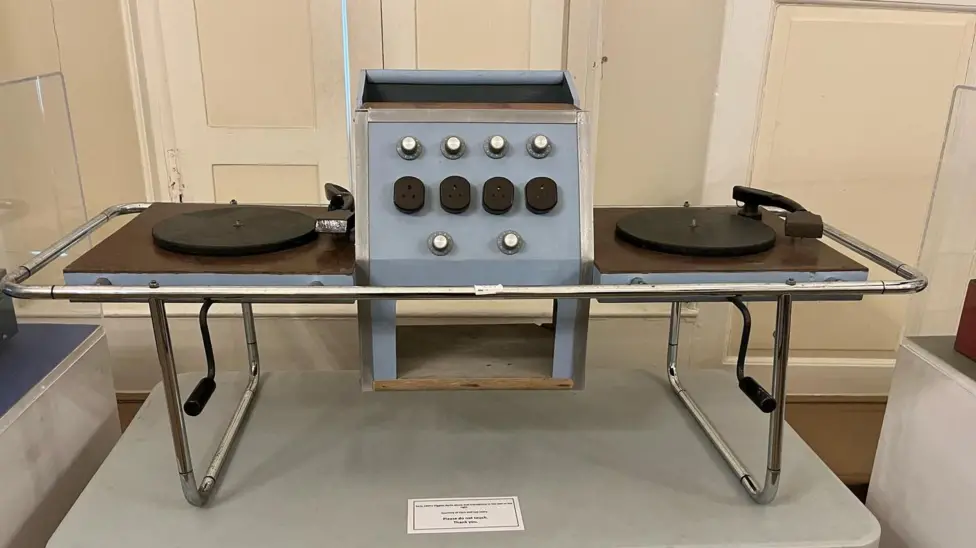

In all, he created 6 Art Deco  styled 'Diggolas'running concurrently in the 1950s, his first method of transport being his Hillman Minx car. https://www.lincolnshireworld.com/news/rons-famous-diggola-goes-on-display-718438 https://www.bbc.co.uk/sounds/play/p0l3xwtc?partner=uk.co.bbc&origin=share-mobile

== History ==
The first entertainment company (in the world) to invent the term, "Mobile Discotheque" was based in the United Kingdom and it was launched by a young man called Roger Squire. The word "discotheque" is a modification of the French word "bibliotheque" which means (in French), library of books. A club in Paris in the 1950s with twin turntables playing only records modified this word converting it to "discotheque" (then meaning library of records).

It was not until the mid 1960s that one or two London based clubs discovered and borrowed the term "discotheque" to describe their music format. By early 1966, Roger Squire saw a big marketing opportunity to add the word "mobile" before the word "discotheque" in order to launch a new style DJ based mobile entertainment service. He was the first person in the world to launch such a service using the banner Roger Squire's Mobile Discotheques. His new service was launched in London in June 1966 and it quickly became hugely successful.

Within two years, Squire had fifteen mobile discothèques performing approximately sixty functions every week. He performed at events attended by celebrities and royalty, at countless college dances, wedding receptions, and all kinds of social events. Over the next few years, many copycat "Mobile Discos" started to emulate his successful formula. During this period, London got it Swinging London reputation. Squire later set up a disco equipment supply service called Squire Light & Sound that sold disco sound and lighting systems to budding DJs, both in the United Kingdom and abroad.

The Squire's Company became the biggest name in UK DJ entertainment in the 60s, 70s and 80s before Roger retired from the business 1988. Roger later took up writing DJ advice articles in DJ magazines and the magazine Pro Mobile, later awarded Roger Squire a Lifetime Achievement Award in March 2015.

In the 1980s and 1990s, mobile DJs began to form associations and create professional business networks that evolved into annual trade shows and internet discussion forums. The early 1990s saw the emergence of organized professional trade shows such as the "Mobile Beat Show" in Las Vegas, Nevada, and the "DJ Times Expo" in Atlantic City, New Jersey. Seminars by numerous respected DJs such as John Rozz, Ray "Ray Mar" Martinez, Stacy Zemon, Mark Ferrell, Peter Merry, Randy Bartlett, and Steve Moody have helped DJs to better understand their profession, how to be more professional and to treat being a DJ as a business operation.

1991 saw the publication of Mobile Beat, a magazine geared specifically toward mobile DJs. In 1992, the Moving Picture Experts Group (MPEG), released The MPEG-1 file standard, designed to produce reasonable sound from a digital file using minimal storage. The lossy compression scheme MPEG-1 Layer-3, popularly known as MP3, later revolutionized the digital music domain.

In 1998, Final Scratch debuted at the BE Developer Conference, marking the first digital DJ system to give DJs control of MP3 files through special time-coded vinyl records or CDs. While it would take some time for this novel concept to catch on with the "die hard" vinyl-oriented DJs, it was the first step in the new digital DJ revolution. Manufacturers joined with computer DJ pioneers to offer professional endorsements, the first being "Professor Jam", also known as William P. Rader, who went on to develop the industry's first dedicated computer DJ convention and learning program, the "Computerized Performance System" (CPS) known as "DJ Summit", which helped spread the word about the advantages of this emerging technology.

The American Disc Jockey Awards Show was established, and its first edition was held in Las Vegas, Nevada in 1998. Since then, thirteen mobile DJs have been elected to the American Disc Jockey Hall of Fame. The thirteen members include John Rozz, Al Lampkin, Joe Martin, Robert A. Lindquist, Jon Michaels, Mike Buonaccorso, Sid Vanderpool, Bobby Morganstein, John Roberts, Ken Knotts, Ray "Ray Mar" Martinez, Cesar Cosio, and Bernie Howard-Fryman.

The American Disc Jockey Awards Show annually recognized and honored individuals who had given of themselves to benefit their community or a charitable cause in the name of the ADJA or the DJ Trade as a whole.It is currently in hiatus since 2013.

The "DJ of the Year" winners at the DJ Times Expo include three-time winner Marcello Pedalino, Roxanne Greene, K.C. KoKoruz, Shawn "Big Daddy" McKee, Marz Lawhorn, Gerry Siracusa, Adam Weitz, Steve Moody and Pascal Levesque who, in 2013, was the first Canadian to take part in the competition. Pascal Levesque from Québec, Canada, was named "DJ of the Year Runner-Up" and won the "Best Dance" award. On May 10, 2020, John Walter, The Chief Tabulator of votes for The DJ of The Year Award died from complications with COVID-19.

== Developments ==
A number of books have been written about the business, and by furthering their education at trade shows and seminars, mobile DJs have gained a positive public perception. In the 1970s Mobile DJs were averaging $350–500 per four-hour event; now a wedding reception can cost between $800–2,500 per event, with the national average being around $1,038.

While many club disc jockeys still use traditional vinyl records, many mobile DJs also currently use compact discs, computer-based files (such as MP3s), or a combination of sources. In addition, professional-grade equipment created by a variety of companies expressly for the mobile DJ industry has allowed for faster set-up and break down times and improved quality of performance.

With the advance of in-home sound systems, the audience expectation level of sound and lighting shows for concerts, conventions, and weddings has increased. LED technology is the most recent light show technology incorporated by the trade. A large selection of music, professional-grade equipment, good organizational skills, vocal talent as a Master of Ceremonies, mixing skills, quality lighting, insurance for liability, and on-site back-up equipment are typical of the expectations customers have when hiring a mobile DJ. Suggestions for hiring mobile disc jockeys include requests for referrals, approximate age of equipment, level of insurance, contract terms and fees, and provision of electrical sources.

Many mobile DJs also promote themselves as event planners, organizers, and master of ceremonies (MC). They work closely with their customers, guests, and the event's other vendors (e.g. venue staff and photographers/videographers) to provide quality entertainment that fits the event in terms of style and performance.

This increased role in event planning has been facilitated by the emergence of sweet sixteens, popularized by the MTV reality show, My Super Sweet 16. Today's mobile DJs are tasked with putting together major productions for these events, which require customization in every element of “her big night”. As huge as the demand for qualified teen-event DJs is, the equipment list to bring a full production on the road for a successful event is more than most can afford. With large-screen video, fog, light up dance floors, glow lights, lasers, high end dance lighting, and booming sound, today's Sweet Sixteens are setting the bar high for future generations.
