= Marri =

Marri may refer to

== Species ==
- Corymbia calophylla, marri, common name of a tree (syn. Eucalyptus calophylla)
- Pterocaesio marri, a ray-finned fish

== Places ==
=== Pakistan ===
- Marri (Rajanpur), a village in Punjab, Pakistan
- Marri-Bugti Country, a tribal region during the British occupation of Baluchistan
- Gul Beg Marri railway station
- Jalal Marri railway station

=== Elsewhere ===
- Marri, Iran (disambiguation), several villages
- Marri, Tibet, a village

== Other ==
- Marri (name)
- Marri (tribe) in Balochistan
- Marri Ngarr, an indigenous Australian people of the Northern Territory
- Al-Marri v. Spagone, a 2009 American court case

== See also ==
- Marris, a surname
