= Secret Millionaires Club =

Animated series

- Genre: Educational
- Developed by: A Squared Entertainment
- Written by: Various
- Directed by: David Elvin; Panlin Qiu
- Voices of: Warren Buffett; Chris Jai Alex; Ogie Banks; Julie Maddalena; Stephanie Sheh; Steve Staley
- Theme music composer: Ron Wasserman
- Opening theme: "Secret Millionaires Club Theme"
- Ending theme: "Secret Millionaires Club Theme" (instrumental)
- Composer: Ron Wasserman
- Countries of origin: China; United States
- Original language: English
- No. of seasons: 1
- No. of episodes: 26

Production
- Executive producers: Amy Moynihan Heyward; Andy Heyward; Lifeng Wang
- Production location: New York City
- Running time: 30 minutes
- Production companies: Berkshire Hathaway; Bang Zoom! Entertainment; Xing Xing Animation

Original release
- Network: The Hub / Hub Network
- Release: October 23, 2011 – January 11, 2017 (Qubo broadcast only)

Secret Millionaires Club is a children's educational animated TV series that aired on The Hub / Hub Network from October 23, 2011 to January 11, 2017. Qubo would later air reruns of the series from 2016 until its closure in 2021. The series focuses on a famous investor Warren Buffett as a secret mentor to a group of kids who learn practical life lessons during their adventures in business.

The show was originally a short-length webseries for AOL Kids in 2010.

== Plot ==
The series follows the business adventures of racially-diverse kids: Radley, Elena, Jones, Lisa, along their robot Starty, and Warren Buffett as their mentor. Every episode focuses on a different business situation that kids might encounter in their day-to-day lives like having to raise money for something they want, or helping a local shop owner understand why their business isn't working. The kids are smart and enterprising, and come to realize that the best investment they can make is an investment in themselves.

== Characters ==
- Warren Buffett (voiced by himself and Kevin Brief (later credited as Guy Pinkham); varies in different episodes) is a millionaire who serves as the mentor of Elena, Jones, Radley, and Lisa.
- Radley Hemming (voiced by Ogie Banks) is the African-American intellectual of the group. Conservative in nature, he balances emotions with a practical and well thought out approach to life. He also serves as the love interest to Elena in some episodes.
  - Starty (voiced by Chris Jai Alex) is Radley's robot.
  - D.E.B. (voiced by Debbie Bosanek) is an application that is on Radley's tablet computer. Radley often consults D.E.B. about the definition of certain words.
- Elena Ramirez (voiced by Julie Maddalena) is a clever Latina optimist with an upbeat personality. She tends to mediate for Jones and Radley when neither can see the others' point of view. Her biggest goal is working for the United Nations.
- David Alan Jones (voiced by Steve Staley) is the comedic kid and is the daredevil of the group. He is a risk-taker and whose impulsiveness often gets him into trouble.
- Hou "Lisa" Lihua (voiced by Stephanie Sheh) is a Chinese exchange student who never leaves home without her fancy purse and has a likeness for fashion.
- Jay-Z, Nick Cannon, Shaquille O'Neal and Bill Gates voiced as themselves

== Episodes ==
| No. | Title | Directed by | Written by | Original release date | Prod. code |
|---|---|---|---|---|---|
| 1 | "Be Cool to Your School" | David Elvin and Panlin Qiu | Ann Austen | October 23, 2011 | 101 |
Following Warren Buffett's visit to their school, four students Elena, Jones, Radley, and Lisa hear from the principal that the school trip to New York and some other school activities have been canceled. The kids plan to raise money to get the trip to New York working again. When the kids fail to raise money for an important school field trip, Warren shows them that in business, and in life, there are no failures. He encourages them to learn from their mistakes and even embrace them. They discard their ideas that did not work, focus on what they did and not only raise enough money to save the field trip, but decide to form a club, the Secret Millionaires Club, and help others solve their money problems. During their trip to New York, the kids meet one of Warren Buffett's friends who happens to be Jay-Z as he encourages the kids to always follow their dreams. Note: The song "Empire State of Mind" was heard in this episode, but removed in later TV airings.
| 2 | "Neither a Borrower Nor a Lender Be, Dude" | David Elvin and Panlin Qiu | Andy Heyward | April 28, 2012 | 102 |
While the SMC sets out to save their local newspaper by bringing it to the Internet, Jones borrows Lisa's carefully saved money for a tournament and then cannot pay it back when he loses to a female skateboarder in the finals. Tensions escalate as both learn a high-priced lesson.
| 3 | "When Pigs Fly" | David Elvin and Panlin Qiu | Mark Zaslove | September 22, 2012 | 103 |
Elena has to raise a piglet named Truffles for a school project and learns what she has to do to pull this off from Warren Buffett. The SMC help a friend named Pete Jr. who has been left in charge of a pet store that was run by his father who has fallen ill.
| 4 | "The Cost of Giving" | David Elvin and Panlin Qiu | Mark Zaslove | December 16, 2012 | 104 |
Lisa faces a potential burnout and important lesson on life-balance. The Secret Millionaires Club come to the aid of Enzo, the owner of the restaurant Pastapolis to help increase customer awareness to his business.
| 5 | "Elena's Shaqtastic Adventure" | David Elvin and Panlin Qiu | Mark Zaslove | January 20, 2013 | 105 |
Warren Buffett invites Shaquille O'Neal to help Elena make the right decision of going to an elite sports camp or jeopardizing her education.
| 6 | "Avast Ye Downloads!" | David Elvin and Panlin Qiu | Mark Zaslove | February 11, 2013 | 106 |
When the Secret Millionaires Club travels to London, Europe, they learn a lesson about the illegal downloading of music when their music video is pirated by their fans. At the same time, they help to look for a solution to help their friend Millie save a record store that is owned by Millie's family while getting advice from Warren Buffett and Nick Cannon.
| 7 | "Down and Out in Beijing" | David Elvin and Panlin Qiu | Mark Zaslove | March 10, 2013 | 107 |
The Secret Millionaires Club visits Beijing where they meet Lisa's cousin Bohai who bites off more than he can chew. Together they learn that having a plan is fundamental to traveling and running a successful business.
| 8 | "Listen to the Music" | David Elvin and Panlin Qiu | Kevin O'Donnell | April 14, 2013 | 108 |
In order to help a musical superstar and her opening act, the Secret Millionaires Club must take on a greedy manager who is exploiting the talent.
| 9 | "Paranormally, We Don't Do This Kind of Thing" | David Elvin and Panlin Qiu | Ron Nelson & Mark Steen | May 19, 2013 | 109 |
The Secret Millionaires Club goes to Scotland where Radley plans to go to MacAlistair Castle (the location of MacAlistair Bed and Breakfast owned by the Graham Family) to prove that ghosts don't exist when it is said to be haunted by the Ghost of Old Lady MacAllistair and her dog Seamus which have been scaring away customers. The Secret Millionaires Club must find a way to dispel the rumors and attract new customers. Meanwhile, Elena plans to tutor Jones in math in order to get him a good grade.
| 10 | "A Gift Shop Too Far" | David Elvin and Panlin Qiu | Mark Zaslove | June 30, 2013 | 110 |
The Secret Millionaires Club goes to Indonesia to save an orangutan rehabilitation sanctuary. They discover the pitfalls of getting involved in businesses that they don't understand.
| 11 12 13 | "A Midwestern Yankee in King Arthur's Court" | David Elvin and Panlin Qiu | Mark Zaslove Kevin O'Donnell | September 22, 2013 | 111 112 113 |
Part 1: Warren, Starty and the Secret Millionaires Club are transported back into time to Camelot by Merlin where they embark on a quest to Camelot for Six Golden Rules that will save young King Arthur's kingdom (which has fallen into debt) at the same time when Guinevere is abducted by a dragon. While King Arthur is heading up a quest to learn the Six Golden Rules, King Arthur's cousin Morgan le Fay schemes to win Camelot in the auction and will try various methods to make sure that King Arthur fails. Part 2: With two of the Six Golden Rules memorized, King Arthur works to find a jousting champion to go up against Morgan le Fay's Dark and Stormy Knight. Meanwhile, Warren and Merlin search for the Merlin's former servant Knives Knasty (who Merlin fired for stealing the castle silverware) when Merlin's Book of Spells was stolen. Part 3: With four of the Six Golden Rules memorized and the jousting tournament is won by Squire Terrance Topples (who represented King Arthur in the tournament), the SMC and King Arthur's group continue their quest for the remaining two parts of the Six Golden Rules while finding a way to rescue Guinevere from the dragon. Meanwhile, Warren and Merlin arrive at the auction house at Ye Bay to keep the Book of Spells from falling into Morgan le Fay's hands.
| 14 | "The Final Financial Frontier" | David Elvin and Panlin Qiu | Mark Zaslove | October 19, 2013 | 114 |
At the time when Radley imagines himself going into outer space, the Secret Millionaires Club helps to solve the financial crisis of Zack Zachary's company called Rocket Incorporated which planned to give people a tour in space. When none of the ideas to improve the company work, the SMC turns to Warren Buffett and the astronauts John D. Olivas and Liu Yang for advice.
| 15 | "The Gift" | David Elvin and Panlin Qiu | Michael Maurer | November 24, 2013 | 115 |
The Secret Millionaires Club visits an African village where they must bring electricity to the village as part of their challenge from Bill Gates. They meet Adisu and village elder Kwende's daughter Ateefah. The SMC then plan to make a water wheel to supply electricity to the village. When Radley and Adisu end up arguing about the waterwheel designs, Elena ends up getting advice from Warren Buffett and Bill Gates on how to get them to work together.
| 16 | "Just Say Snow!" | David Elvin and Panlin Qiu | Mark Zaslove | December 22, 2013 | 116 |
The Secret Millionaires Club are on winter break where they find that the owner of Snowy Lodge named Jerry Crenshaw had retired and a new owner from Switzerland named Lucas has redecorated the hotel to make it feel like home. With no visitors to the lodge and no available part-time jobs due to lack of visitors, Jones gets a job to be a poster boy for the lodge's advertisement and meets Lucas' son Phillipe who secretly doesn't know how to ski.
| 17 | "To Herring is Human" | David Elvin and Panlin Qiu | Mark Zaslove | January 26, 2014 | 117 |
While in Stockholm, Sweden during the Herring Festival, the Secret Millionaires Club drums up business for a small herring eatery called Dahlquist's which is run by Isak Dahlquist's family. The SMC discover that Dahlquist's faces stiff competition from a fast-food restaurant called the Happy Herring which is owned by Arnie Sr. Meanwhile, Jones and Radley learns about Bandy from Isak as they learn how do Bandy against Arnie Jr.'s team.
| 18 | "Goooooal!" | David Elvin and Panlin Qiu | Kevin O'Donnell | February 16, 2014 | 118 |
The Secret Millionaires Club are in a race against the clock to save a local soccer team called the Swans from being sold. While improving the gameplay and the services at the arena, they receive help from one of Warren Buffett's friends named David Beeks who is a soccer player.
| 19 | "Get a Clue, Dude" | David Elvin and Panlin Qiu | Mark Zaslove | March 16, 2014 | 119 |
The Secret Millionaires Club help a robotics museum called the Robosity Museum to attract more visitors. At the same time, items mysteriously disappear where Starty is behind this due to Radley constructing a self-repair unit in him. After Starty comes in contact with the display of the robot Arty (who was built by the scientist Professor Otto von Otto), this causes a chain of events that activates all the robots in the museum who start helping Arty to repair Starty by claiming different items.
| 20 | "Fashion Bot Fiasco" | David Elvin and Panlin Qiu | Kevin O'Donnell | April 27, 2014 | 120 |
Lisa and Radley create a Fashion Bot which sparks interest from a national toy chain, but the kids focus their attention on a local store and a science fair.
| 21 | "Sing Between the Lines" | David Elvin and Panlin Qiu | Mark Zaslove | September 21, 2014 | 121 |
The Secret Millionaires Club search for a young singer named Lucinda who hides following a great audition at a performing arts school established by Kelly Rowland. They must try to persuade her to confront her biggest fear. Meanwhile, Radley tries to help Elena ace her chemistry assignment.
| 22 | "Sweeet'" | David Elvin and Panlin Qiu | Mark Zaslove | October 12, 2014 | 122 |
An up-and-coming chocolate maker named Julian starts a new business, but he neglects to tell the Secret Millionaires Club something crucial. Now they must act quickly in order to get Julian's business on the right track and obtain money to pay for the wedding of Julian and his fiancé Zoe.
| 23 | "Far Out Future" | David Elvin and Panlin Qiu | Kevin O'Donnell | January 10, 2017 | 123 |
The Secret Millionaires Club travels to the future to help save the world's first Time Machine company but they find they may not even have time to save themselves.
| 24 | "For Pete's Pets Sake" | David Elvin and Panlin Qiu | Douglas Wood | January 10, 2017 | 124 |
When puppies who have escaped from a local pet shop suddenly show up on the doorstep of the Secret Millionaires Club's headquarters, the kids help the overwhelmed pet shop owner regain control of his business, and in the process also help a disabled reporter discover the value of adding a dog to her life.
| 25 | "Big Things Come in Micro Packages" | David Elvin and Panlin Qiu | Mark Zaslove | January 11, 2017 | 125 |
The Secret Millionaires Club must fight for Girl Empowerment while in Africa with Oprah Winfrey and aid a struggling all woman family banana business who the banks won't give a loan to due to there being no "man of the house".
| 26 | "Camp Big Foot" | David Elvin and Panlin Qiu | Mark Zaslove | January 11, 2017 | 126 |
At Camp Big Foot, the Secret Millionaires Club kids search for Bigfoot to raise money for the camp, only to get trapped on an island with two counselors that won't stop squabbling.
