= Merry =

Merry may refer to: A happy person with a jolly personality.

== People ==
- Merry (given name)
- Merry (surname)

== Music ==
- Merry (band), a Japanese rock band
- Merry (EP), an EP by Gregory Douglass
- "Merry" (song), by American power pop band Magnapop

== Places ==
- Merry Township, Thurston County, Nebraska

== See also ==
- Meri (disambiguation)
- Merri (disambiguation)
- Merrie
- Mery (disambiguation)
