= Vedalam (soundtrack) =

Soundtrack album by Anirudh Ravichander
- Released: 21 October 2015
- Recorded: 2015
- Genre: Feature film soundtrack
- Length: 18:33
- Language: Tamil
- Label: Sony Music India
- Producer: Anirudh Ravichander

Anirudh Ravichander chronology
Naanum Rowdy Dhaan (2015)	Vedalam (2015)	Thanga Magan (2015)

Vedalam is the soundtrack album composed by Anirudh Ravichander for the 2015 Tamil film of the same name, written and directed by Siva starring Ajith Kumar in the titular lead role. The film marks Anirudh's first collaboration with Ajith and Siva. The album featured five songs (including a theme track) and lyrics were written by Madhan Karky, Rokesh, Viveka and Siva. The soundtrack album was released on 21 October 2015 through the Sony Music India record label.

== Development ==
On 19 March 2015, Anirudh Ravichander was announced to compose music for Vedalam and was officially confirmed his inclusion for the project. He started working for the film's music during mid-April 2015.

On 1 May 2015, coinciding with Ajith's birthday, Anirudh reported to social media, that the introduction song and theme music for the film has been completed. "Veera Vinayaka", the introductory number is based on the Vinayagar Chathurthi celebrations, similar to "Maha Ganapathi" from Amarkkalam (1999) and "Pillayarpatti Hero" from Vaanmathi (1996). The theme track of the film is rumoured to be titled "Verithanam" which was proved untrue. Lyricist Rokesh in an interview to The Hindu, said that "Aaluma Doluma" means a 'sneaky troublemaker' in colloquial Tamil-language in North Chennai. He saw few women fight for water in his locality, which made him to write the song. Anirudh roped in Punjabi-rapper Badshah, in his first Tamil song for the track "Aaluma Doluma".

Anirudh recalled in 2021 at the Super Singer reality show, saying that he was not impressed with the tune he came for "Aaluma Doluma". He called Siva not to shoot for the song and convinced him that he would give another song for the situation. The following day, when Anirudh called Siva, saying that he had liked the track and had finished shooting for the song. He later added that the track became a viral hit and was convinced with the success of the song.

== Release ==
The marketing rights for the musical album were purchased by Sony Music India. The film's incomplete track list featuring the song titles, was released through Anirudh's Twitter handle on 12 October 2015, and the official track list was unveiled shortly after two days. It was reported that the soundtrack album will be released during the composer's birthday on 16 October 2015. But the album was eventually released on 21 October 2015, coinciding with Dusshera. Shortly after the audio release, the song teasers of "Aaluma Doluma" and "Veera Vinayaka" were released on 25 and 30 October. Within 12 hours, the former garnered over 4 million views on YouTube. An extended version of the track featuring Anirudh and rapper Badshah was released on 31 October.

== Reception ==
The album received mixed response from critics. Reviewing for The Times of India, Sharanya CR wrote "After giving a hit album like Naanum Rowdy Dhaan, Anirudh effortlessly changes his game in this mass album." Milliblog reviewed it as a "punchy" and "likeable commercial soundtrack." Despite the mixed response, the song "Aaluma Doluma" became a viral hit upon release. India Today chose the track as one of the "top 15 Tamil songs of 2015". The Times of India called it as "one of the best dance numbers of the decade", as was DT Next which published the special edition of "10 iconic dance numbers in Tamil cinema" on the International Dance Day (29 April 2021), included the song in the list.

== Track listing ==
No.	Title	Writer(s)	Singer(s)	Length
1.	"Veera Vinayaka"	Viveka	Anirudh Ravichander, Vishal Dadlani	4:22
2.	"Don't You Mess With Me"	Madhan Karky	Shruti Haasan, Shakthisree Gopalan	4:56
3.	"Uyir Nadhi Kalangudhey"	Viveka	Ravi Shankar	3:03
4.	"The Theri Theme"	Siva	Anirudh Ravichander	1:52
5.	"Aaluma Doluma"	Rokesh	Anirudh Ravichander, Badshah	4:18
Total length:				18:33
