= Mari (given name) =

- Pronunciation: Mah-ree
- Gender: Female
- Languages: Japanese, Latin

Origin
- Origin: Japanese
- Meaning: Different depending on the kanji
- Region of origin: Japanese, Norwegian, Swedish, Hungarian, Estonian, Armenian

Other names
- Related names: Mariko; Mary

Mari is a feminine given name in the Breton, Korean, Japanese, Syriac-Aramaic language, Armenian, Estonian, Georgian, Hungarian, Finnish, Welsh, Swedish and Norwegian languages. It is also a devotional given name in Tamil. It can be seen as a cognate of Mary in Danish, Finnish, Norwegian or Swedish. In Estonian, it is a shortened variety of proper names like Marianne; in Estonian it is often perceived as a derivation of "mari" (berry). In the countries of Georgia and Armenia, Mari is a shortened version of the name Mariam. In Armenia, Mari (Մարի) was the 2nd-most-common female given name of 2013. In Syriac-Aramaic this is the name of a male saint.

In Japanese it appears as Mari (まり, マリ), or can be written using different kanji characters so that it means, respectively:

- 真理, "truth"
- 万里, "long distance"
- 茉莉, "jasmine"
- 麻里, "hemp, village"
- 麻莉, "hemp, white jasmine"
- 愛莉, "love, white jasmine" (This kanji can also be read as Airi.)

The name can also be written in hiragana or katakana.

== People ==
- Saint Mari, a 1st-century saint of the Church of the East and several other denominations
- Mari of Seleucia-Ctesiphon, Patriarch of the Church of the East (987–999)
- Mari ibn Suleiman (12th century), historian
- Mari Abel (born 1975), Estonian actress
- Mari Akasaka (真理, born 1964), Japanese novelist
- Mari Alkatiri (born 1949), Prime Minister of East Timor from 2002 to 2006
- Mari Amachi (真理, born 1951), Japanese singer and actress
- Mari Blanchard (1923–1970), American actress
- Mari Boya (born 2004), Spanish racing driver
- Mari Ellis (1913–2015), Welsh writer and women's rights activist
- Mari Evans (1919–2017), American poet
- Mari Hamada (麻里, born 1962), Japanese rock singer
- Mari Hamada (actress) (マリ, born 1968), Japanese singer and actress
- Mari Hanafusa (まり, born 1974), Japanese actress in Takarazuka Revue
- Mari Henmi (マリ, born 1950), Japanese singer and actress
- Mari Ruef Hofer (1858/59-1929), American composer, lecturer, teacher, writer
- Mari Horikawa|堀川 真理||born 1992}}, Japanese volleyball player
- Mari Hoshino (真里, born 1981), Japanese actress
- Mari Hulman George (1934–2018), American auto racing executive
- Mari Iijima (真理, born 1963), Japanese singer-songwriter
- Mari Jászai (1850–1926), Hungarian actress
- Mari Kalkun (born 1986), Estonian singer and musician
- Mari Kimura (木村 まり, born 1962), Japanese violinist and composer
- Mari Kinsigo (1946–2014), Estonian chess Woman FIDE Master
- Mari Kiviniemi (born 1968), Finnish politician and former Prime Minister of Finland
- Mari Klaup (born 1990), Estonian heptathlete
- Mari Kodama (麻里, born 1967), Japanese pianist
- Mari Kotani (真理, born 1958), Japanese science fiction critic
- Mari Kurismaa (born 1956), Estonian artist and architect
- Mari Lill (born 1945), Estonian actress
- Mari Mahr (born 1941), Hungarian-British photographer
- Mari Mashiba (摩利, born 1959), Japanese voice actress
- Mari Matsuda (born 1956), American lawyer, activist, and law professor
- Mari Mori (茉莉, 1903–1987), Japanese author, daughter of novelist Mori Ōgai
- Mari Motohashi (麻里, born 1986), Japanese curler
- Mari Must (1920–2008), Estonian linguist
- Mari Natsuki (マリ, born 1952), Japanese singer, dancer, and actress
- Mari Ness (born c 1971) is an American poet and author
- Mari Ozaki (まり, born 1975), Japanese long-distance runner
- Mari Ozawa (真理), Japanese manga artist
- Mari J. Patterson (born 1980), American Filmmaker
- Mari Possa (born 1980), Salvadoran actress
- Mari Saat (born 1947), Estonian writer
- Mari Shimizu (マリ, born 1936), Japanese voice actress
- Mari Shiraki (白木 万理; born 1937), Japanese actress
- Mari Shirato (真理, born 1958), Japanese actress
- Mari Sono (園まり; 1944–2024), Japanese singer and actress
- Mari Tarand (1941–2020), Estonian journalist and radio personality
- Mari Törőcsik (1935–2021), Hungarian stage and film actress
- Mari Trini (1947–2009), Spanish singer songwriter
- Mari Jose Urruzola (1940–2006), Spanish educator, feminist, and writer
- Mari Wilson (born 1954), English pop and jazz singer
- Mari Yaguchi (真里, born 1983), former member of the Japanese idol group Morning Musume
- Mari Yonehara (万里, 1950–2006), Japanese translator, essayist, non-fiction writer and novelist

== Fictional characters ==
- Mari Ibarra, in the television series Yellowjackets
- Mari Iyagi, in My Beautiful Girl, Mari
- Mari Katsuki (勝生 真利), in the anime series Yuri!!! on Ice
- Mari Kurihara (栗原 万里), in the manga and anime series Prison School
- Mari Jiwe McCabe, also known as Vixen, a DC Comics character
- Mari Illustrious Makinami (真希波・マリ・イラストリアス), in the Japanese animated film series Rebuild of Evangelion
- Mari Ohara (小原 鞠莉), in the anime series Love Live! Sunshine!!
- Mari Sonoda (園田 真理), in the tokusatsu television series Kamen Rider 555
- Mari Tamaki (玉木 マリ), in the anime series A Place Further than the Universe
- Mari Tsutsui (筒井 真理), in the manga and anime series Whisper Me a Love Song
- Mari Tsutui (筒井 まり), in the manga and anime series Rainbow Days
- Mari Watanabe (渡辺 摩利), in the light novel series The Irregular at Magic High School
- Mari Yamamoto (山本 麻里), in the tokusatsu television series Kamen Rider Fourze
- Mari Yamashita (山下 マリ), in the manga series Inubaka: Crazy for Dogs
- Maari, in the Tamil action comedy Maari
- MARI, in the psychological horror game Omori
- Mari, in the side-scrolling MMORPG Grand Chase
- Iochi Mari (伊落マリー), in the mobile gacha game Blue Archive

== See also ==
- Mari (disambiguation)
- Temari (toy), "hand ball" in Japanese
- Maari (film)
