= Hyper Speed GranDoll =

Original video animation

超光速グランドール (Chō Kōsoku Gurandōru)
- Genre: Science fiction
- Original video animation
- Directed by: Hideki Tonokatsu
- Produced by: Motoki Ueda; Atsushi Sugita; Hiroaki Takaoka; Jinichiro Koyama
- Written by: Yuko Nakada
- Music by: Toshiro Yabuki
- Studio: Zero-G Room
- Licensed by: NA: Central Park Media (expired)
- Released: 25 August 1997 – 18 December 1997
- Runtime: 30 minutes (each)
- Episodes: 3
- Video game
- Developer: Kid
- Publisher: Emotion Digital Software
- Genre: Side-scrolling platform game
- Platform: PlayStation
- Released: 24 July 1997

Hyper Speed GranDoll (超光速グランドール, Chō Kōsoku Gurandōru) is an anime OVA about a high school girl who discovers that she is really part of a royal lineage of aliens from a distant planet. The anime was released in the United States by Central Park Media.

== Plot ==
While Koichi Amagi is making a marriage proposal to his beloved Miki, a space ship fell right in front of them. Inside the space ship there was a little girl who they adopted and named Hikaru. Years are passing by normally while Hikaru is living her life as a normal girl, with a mad scientist as her father. Someday aliens are appearing to retrieve Hikaru back from Earth as she is an Alien and is the last member of a royal familyline of a planet far away.

== Video game ==
A game based on this OVA was released for the PlayStation in Japan which is an action sidescrolling platformer similar to Metroid and Mega Man.

The game's plot closely follows the OVA's storyline, except for a few minor differences. Unlike the anime where Hikaru only fights in her standard armor, in the game she gets multiple different styles of armor upgrades after defeating a boss, similar to Mega Man ZX's Bio Metal System.

== Episodes ==
There are 3 episodes:

1. An Eventful Double Date (愛と爆発のグループ交際、Ai to bakuhatsu no gurūpu kōsai)
2. A Heroic Transfer Student (転校生は素敵なヒロイン、Tenkōsei wa sutekina hiroin)
3. Give Me Courage (告白...勇気をください...、Kokuhaku… yūki o kudasai…)

== Music ==
Ending theme
"The Moment When You Softly Swear" (そっと誓う瞬間-とき-、Sotto Chikau Chunkan Toki) by Junko Iwao

== Reception ==
Bamboo Dong of Anime News Network described Hyper Speed GranDoll as being very predictable, comparing it to a "color by numbers" book. However, said that it was still entertaining enough to warrant a rental. Chris Beveridge of Mania.com expressed similar sentiments, calling the anime "fun" but also "by the numbers".
