= Mari (surname) =

Mari or Marí is a surname. Notable people with the surname include:

- Audra Mari (born 1994), American model, television host, and beauty pageant titleholder
- Enzo Mari (1932–2020), Italian modernist artist and furniture designer
- Franco Mari (1947–2025), Italian actor and comedian
- Giacomo Mari (1924–1991), Italian footballer
- Iela Mari (1931–2014), Italian illustrator and children's book author
- José Mari (disambiguation)
- Julien Mari (born 1990) French rapper
- Lamberto Mari (born 1933), Italian diver who competed in two Olympic Games
- Michele Mari (born 1955), Italian novelist, short story writer, critic and poet, son of Enzo Mari
- Miguel Marí (born 1997), Spanish footballer
- Mufid Mari (born 1959), Israeli Druze politician
- Pablo Marí (born 1993), Spanish footballer
