= Mary =

Mary may refer to:

== People ==
- Mary (name), a female given name
  - List of people with given name Mary, for a list of people with the given name

=== Religion ===
- New Testament people named Mary, overview article linking to many of those below
- Mary, mother of Jesus, also called the Blessed Virgin Mary
- Mary Magdalene, devoted follower of Jesus
- Mary of Bethany, follower of Jesus, considered by Western medieval tradition to be the same person as Mary Magdalene
- Mary, mother of James
- Mary of Clopas, follower of Jesus
- Mary, mother of John Mark
- Mary of Egypt, patron saint of penitents
- Mary of Rome, a New Testament woman
- Mary the Jewess, one of the reputed founders of alchemy, referred to by Zosimus

=== Royalty ===
- Mary, Countess of Blois (1200–1241), daughter of Walter of Avesnes and Margaret of Blois
- Mary of Burgundy (1457–1482), daughter of Charles the Bold, Duke of Burgundy
- Queen Mary of Denmark (born 1972), wife of King Frederik X of Denmark, queen consort since 2024
- Mary I (1516–1558), aka "Bloody Mary", Queen of England and Ireland
- Mary II (1662–1694), Queen of England, Scotland, and Ireland
- Mary of Guelders (c. 1434–1463), daughter of Arnold, Duke of Guelders
- Mary of Guise (1515–1560), Queen Consort of James V of Scotland and mother of Mary, Queen of Scots
- Mary, Queen of Hungary (1371–1395), daughter of Louis I the Great of Hungary
- Mary of Modena (1658–1718), Queen Consort of King James II of England and VII of Scotland
- Mary I of Portugal (1734–1816), daughter of King Joseph I of Portugal
- Mary II of Portugal (1819–1853), daughter of the future King Pedro IV
- Mary, Queen of Scots (1542–1587), mother of James VI and I of Scotland and England
- Mary of Teck (1867–1953), Queen Consort of King George V of the UK
- Mary of Waltham (1344–1362), daughter of King Edward III of England
- Mary of Woodstock (1278–1332), daughter of King Edward I of England
- Mary, Princess Royal and Countess of Harewood (1897–1965), daughter of King George V and Mary of Teck
- Princess Mary, Duchess of Gloucester and Edinburgh (1776–1857), daughter of King George III and Charlotte of Mecklenburg-Strelitz

=== Other people ===
- Mary (slave) (c. 1824 – 1838), American slave executed for murder
- Rosie Attard (2000–2000), British conjoined twin subject to legal case whose pseudonym was Mary
- Parvati Melton (fl. 2004–2013), American model also known as Mary

== Arts and entertainment ==
=== Fictional characters ===
- Mary, a character in Total Drama Presents: The Ridonculous Race
- Mary Conner, a character in Roseanne
- Mary Dean, a character in Love's Old Sweet Song
- Mary Harris, a character in He's Just Not That Into You
- Mary Hartman, the titular character of Mary Hartman, Mary Hartman
- Mary Hendon, a character in A Sinless Sinner
- Mary Jensen, the protagonist of There's Something About Mary
- Mary Lennox, the protagonist of The Secret Garden
- Dr. Mary Malone, a character in the His Dark Materials trilogy
- Mary Marvel, a superheroine and member of the Marvel Family
- Mary Melody, a character in Tiny Toon Adventures
- Mary Poppins (character), a nanny with magical powers
- Lady Mary Crawley, a character in Downton Abbey
- Mary Test, a character in Johnny Test

=== Film ===
- Mary (1931 film), a British-German thriller
- Mary (1994 film), an Australian documentary
- Mary (2005 film), an Italian thriller
- Mary (2019 film), an American horror film
- Mary (2024 film), an American-British biblical film

=== Music ===
==== Albums ====
- Mary (Mary Travers album), 1971
- Mary (Mary J. Blige album), 1999
- Mary (Sarkodie album), 2015

==== Songs ====
- "Mary", by Alexander Egorovich Varlamov (1801–1848)
- "Mary (I'm in Love with You)", by J. Fred Coots and Ozzie Nelson, 1931
- "Mary", by Buffy Sainte-Marie from Illuminations, 1969
- "Mary", by Robert Fripp from Exposure, 1979
- "Mary", by Pete Townshend from Scoop, 1983
- "Mary", by The 4 of Us from the album Songs for the Tempted, 1989
- "Mary" (Tori Amos song), 1992
- "Mary", by Sarah McLachlan from Fumbling Towards Ecstasy, 1993
- "Mary", by Oingo Boingo from Boingo, 1994
- "Mary", by Sublime from Robbin' the Hood, 1994
- "Mary" (Monique Brumby song), from the album Thylacine, 1996
- "Mary" (Supergrass song), from their eponymous album, 1999
- "Mary" (Gemelli DiVersi song), from the album Fuego, 2003
- "Mary" (Scissor Sisters song), from their eponymous album, 2004
- "Mary", by Sarah Slean from Day One, 2004
- "Mary", by The Subways from Young for Eternity, 2005
- "Mary", by Kings of Leon from Come Around Sundown, 2010
- "Mary", by John Cale from Shifty Adventures in Nookie Wood, 2012
- "Mary", by Alex G from Trick, 2012
- "Mary", by Big Thief from Capacity, 2017
- "Mary", by Dune Rats from The Kids Will Know It's Bullshit, 2017

=== Novels ===
- Mary: A Fiction, a 1788 novel by Mary Wollstonecraft
- Mary (Nabokov novel), 1926

=== Television ===
- Mary (1978 TV series), a variety show
- Mary (1985 TV series), a sitcom

=== Theater ===
- Mary (musical), a 1920 comedy by Otto Harbach and Frank Mandel

== Places ==
- Mary River (disambiguation), various rivers
- Mary, Saône-et-Loire, France
- Mary Region, Turkmenistan
  - Mary, Turkmenistan, capital of Mary Region
  - Mary District, in Mary Region

== Ships ==
- Mary, a Hudson's Bay Company vessel in operation from 1737 to 1749
- USS Mary (SP-462), the proposed designation for a motorboat never acquired by the US Navy

== Other uses ==
- List of storms named Mary, various tropical cyclones
- Mary (crater), an impact crater on the Moon
- Mary (elephant), performed in the Sparks World Famous Shows circus
- Mary (programming language)

== See also ==
- Bloody Mary (disambiguation)
- Islas Marías (Spanish: "Mary Islands"), Mexico
- Maree (disambiguation)
- Mari (disambiguation)
- Maria (disambiguation)
- Marie (disambiguation)
- Marius (disambiguation)
- Mary 2.0, a Roman Catholic women's movement
- "Mary Had a Little Lamb", a nursery rhyme by Sarah Josepha Hale, 1830
- "Mary Is a Grand Old Name", a song by George M. Cohan from Forty-five Minutes from Broadway, 1906
- "Mary, Mary, Quite Contrary", an English nursery rhyme, c. 1744
- Mary's Point, New Brunswick, Canada
- Maryam (surah) (Arabic cognate of "Mary"), the 19th chapter of the Qur'an
- Maury (disambiguation)
- Mery (disambiguation)
- Miriai (c. 1st century CE), a figure in the Mandean Book of John
- Miss Mary (disambiguation)
- William and Mary (disambiguation)
