= Werner Zoege von Manteuffel =

Baltic German surgeon (1857–1926)

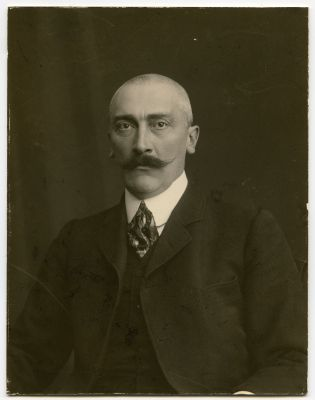
- Werner Zoege von Manteuffel
- Born: 13 July 1857; Määri, Governorate of Estonia, Russian Empire
- Died: 14 March 1926 (aged 68); Tallinn, Estonia
- Education: Imperial University of Dorpat
- Scientific career
- Fields: Surgery, Biology

Werner Maximilian Friedrich Zoege von Manteuffel (13 July 1857, in Määri, Estonia – 14 March 1926, in Tallinn, Estonia) was a Baltic German medical surgeon. He was the earliest advocate of sterilised gloves.

He studied at the Imperial University of Dorpat (Tartu) and became a doctor in 1886.

He published an article in 1897 recommending surgeons use rubber gloves and boil them in water before wearing them. At the time most doctors operated with their bare hands, or wore gloves of cotton, leather, or other absorbent materials.

He was the personal physician of the Russian Emperor Nicholas II. In this position, he also treated the Tsar's son Alexei for several years, who suffered from a hereditary bleeding disorder (hemophilia B).

From 1908, he ran a private clinic in Riga. In 1918, he moved to Reval (Tallinn). In 1918, he became the dean of the Faculty of Medicine of the University of Dorpat. During the Estonian War of Independence (1918–1920), he served as a volunteer military doctor in the Tallinn Hospital.

His maternal grandfather was naturalist, explorer, and mountaineer Friedrich Parrot.
