= Naanum Rowdy Dhaan (soundtrack) =

2015 album by Anirudh Ravichander

Soundtrack album by Anirudh Ravichander
- Released: 7 October 2015
- Recorded: 2015
- Studios: Albuquerque Studios, Chennai
- Genre: Feature film soundtrack
- Length: 24:46
- Language: Tamil
- Labels: Wunderbar Studios; Divo
- Producer: Anirudh Ravichander

Anirudh Ravichander chronology
Maari (2015)	Naanum Rowdy Dhaan (2015)	Vedalam (2015)

Naanum Rowdy Dhaan is the soundtrack to the 2015 film of the same name directed by Vignesh Shivan and produced by Dhanush's Wunderbar Films, starring Vijay Sethupathi and Nayanthara. The soundtrack featured six songs composed by Anirudh Ravichander and were primarily written by Vignesh himself, with the exception of one song by Thamarai, with Anirudh, Neeti Mohan, Benny Dayal, Sid Sriram, and Sean Roldan recording the vocals for the album. All the songs in the film were released as a singles and were well received by critics and listeners.

== Development ==
Naanum Rowdy Dhaan is Vignesh and Anirudh's maiden collaboration as composer-director after Vignesh had worked with Dharan Kumar on his debut film, Podaa Podi (2012), and had earlier collaborated with Anirudh as a lyricist penning one of the songs from Vanakkam Chennai (2013) and the independent single "Chance-ey Illa". Anirudh described it as a "romantic album" being "close to his heart" as the script underlined the romance between the lead pair while also being set as an action comedy. He composed the tunes first for which Vignesh had written the lyrics. By August 2015, Anirudh had completed recording music for most of the songs. Singer Chinmayi had initially recorded the song "Neeyum Naanum", however she was later replaced by Neeti Mohan.

== Marketing and release ==
As a unique promotional strategy, Anirudh planned to release all the songs from the album as individual singles, instead of opting for an audio launch. The first to be released from the album was "Thangamey" recorded by Anirudh and was unveiled on 23 September 2015. It was then followed by "Neeyum Naanum" on 27 September, the title track on 30 September, "Yennai Maatrum Kadhale" on 3 October, "Kannaana Kanne" on 6 October, and "Varavaa Varavaa" was released the following day along with the album. Within its individual release, all the songs topped the ITunes charts in India occupying the first five positions during early October 2015, and played on air at several radio stations.

== Reception ==
Writing for The Times of India, Sharanya CR gave the album four out of five stars and wrote, "Anirudh is totally upping his game through this album, which sounds fresh, unlike his last few albums". Karthik Srinivasan of Milliblog reviewed it with the words "After a series of so-so soundtracks, Anirudh comes back with a bang in Naanum Rowdy Dhaan"

Malini Mannath of The New Indian Express stated that the music and background score "effectively captures the feel", and S. Saraswathi of Rediff.com complimented the music being the "biggest strengths of the film". Manoj Kumar R. of The Indian Express stated that Anirudh's "lively background score coupled with chartbuster songs aids the director in achieving a farcical film about revenge".

== Track listing ==
No.	Title	Lyrics	Singer(s)	Length
1.	"Thangamey"	Vignesh Shivan	Anirudh Ravichander	04:22
2.	"Neeyum Naanum"	Thamarai	Anirudh Ravichander, Neeti Mohan	05:02
3.	"Naanum Rowdy Dhaan"	Vignesh Shivan	Benny Dayal	02:57
4.	"Yennai Maatrum Kadhale"	Vignesh Shivan	Sid Sriram, Anirudh Ravichander	04:34
5.	"Kannaana Kanne"	Vignesh Shivan	Sean Roldan	04:27
6.	"Varavaa Varavaa"	Vignesh Shivan	Anirudh Ravichander, Vignesh Shivan	03:22
Total length:				24:46
