= Miss Mary =

Miss Mary may refer to:

- Miss Mary (1957 film), an Indian comedy film
- Miss Mary (1972 film), an Indian film
- Miss Mary (1986 film), an Argentine-American drama film
- "Miss Mary", a song by Zucchero from Miserere, 1992

== See also ==
- Hamilton v. Alabama (1964), also known as the Miss Mary case
- Mary (disambiguation)
