= Marris =

Marris is a surname. Notable people with the surname include:

- Charles Allan Marris (1876–1947), New Zealand journalist and editor
- Emma Marris (born 1979), American non-fiction writer
- Georgia Marris (born 1996), New Zealand swimmer
- Rob Marris (born 1955), British politician
- William Sinclair Marris (1873–1945), British civil servant, colonial administrator, and classical scholar

== See also ==
- Maris (disambiguation)
- Marri (disambiguation)
