= George Merry =

George Merry may refer to:

- George Merry (skier) (1929–2000), Canadian alpine skier
- George S. Merry (1863–1935), member of the South Dakota House of Representatives
- George Merry (rugby union) (1869–1917), South African rugby union player
