= Meri (name) =

Female given name and family name

Meri is both an Estonian and Finnish surname meaning "sea" and a feminine given name. Notable people with the name include:

Surname

- Arnold Meri (1919–2009), Soviet World War II veteran and Soviet Estonian politician
- Enn Meri (born 1942), Estonian politician
- Georg Meri (1900–1983), Estonian diplomat, writer and translator
- Helle Meri (1949–2024), Estonian actress, First Lady of Estonia 1992–2001, wife of President Lennart Meri
- Hindrek Meri (1934–2009), Estonian statesman
- Lennart Meri (1929–2006), Estonian politician and writer, President of Estonia 1992–2001
- Veijo Meri (1928–2015), Finnish writer

Given name

- Meri Cetinić, Croatian pop singer
- Meri St. Mary, American punk poet
- Meri Utrio, Finnish writer
- Meri Wilson, American singer
- Meri von KleinSmid, American composer and sound artist
