= George Merry (rugby union) =

South African rugby union player

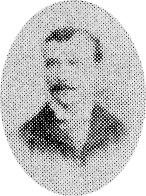
- Born: George Alexander Merry; 3 March 1869 Govan, Scotland, United Kingdom
- Died: 2 May 1917 (aged 48) Hertfordshire, England

Rugby union career
- Position: Forward
Provincial / State sides
Years	Team	Apps	(Points)
	Eastern Province	0	(0)
International career
Years	Team	Apps	(Points)
1891	South Africa	1	(0)

George Alexander Merry (3 March 1869 – 2 May 1917) was a South African international rugby union player who played as a forward.

== Biography ==
Merry was born in Scotland and a captain in the mounted police. He made his only international appearance for South Africa in their first ever Test—against Great Britain at the Crusader's Ground, Port Elizabeth as the first player from Eastern Province to represent South Africa.

=== Test history ===
No.	Opponents	Results(SA 1st)	Position	Tries	Date	Venue
1.	(United Kingdom) British Isles	0–4	Forward		30 Jul 1891	Crusaders Ground, Port Elizabeth

== See also ==
- List of South Africa national rugby union players – Springbok no. 14
