= Mariko Sanjo =

Dancer and choreographer

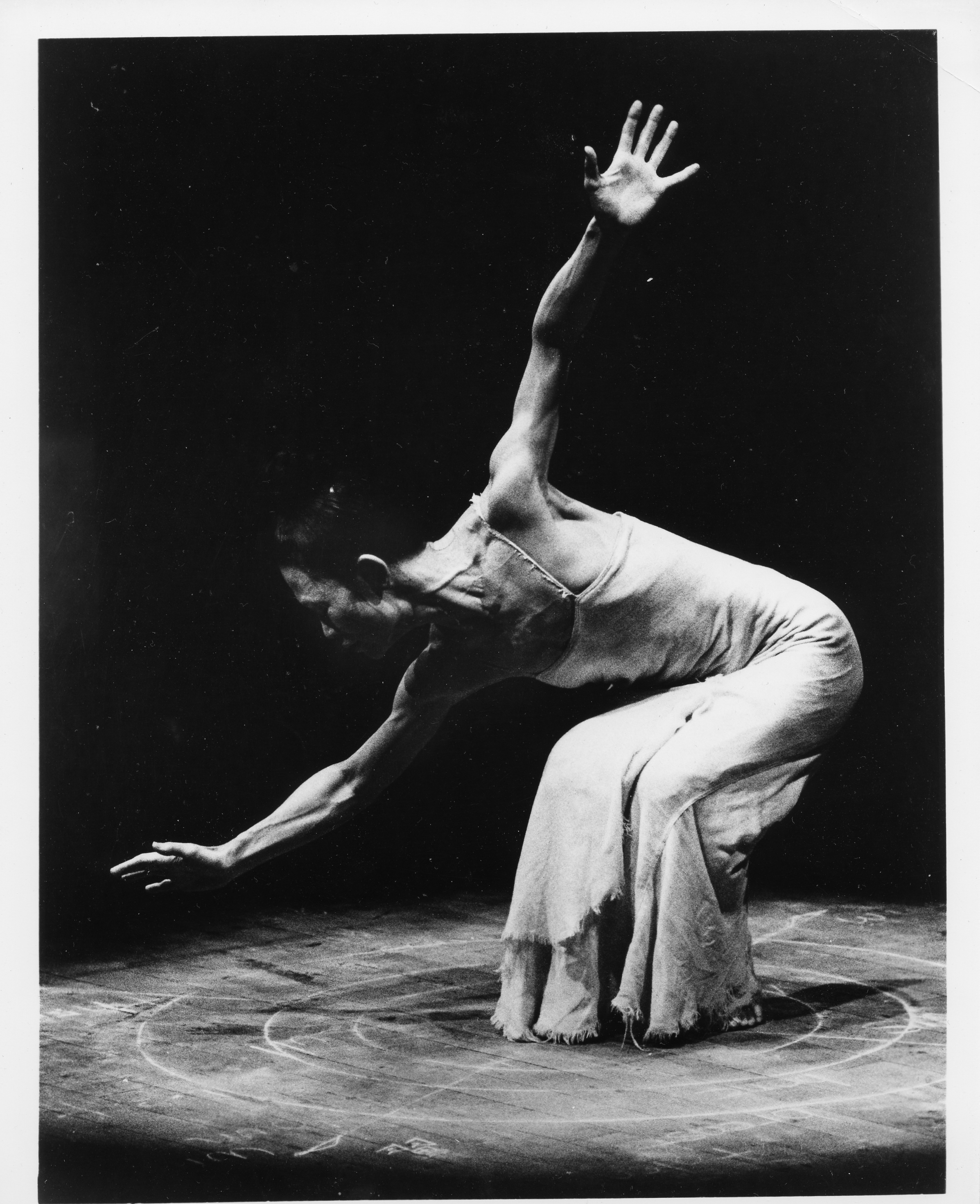
- Born: 12 June 1933 (age 93); Hachiōji, Tokyo, Japan
- Occupation: Dancer

Mariko Sanjo (Japanese: 三条万里子 born June 12, 1933) is a Japanese modern dancer, choreographer, director based in New York City and Japan.

== Biography ==
Mariko was born in 1933 in Tokyo, Japan. She started dancing at the age of three, trained by Hiroshi Ohno who is a disciple of Baku Ishii, a pioneer of modern dance in Japan, and by Takaya Eguchi, another master teacher who studied with Mary Wigman. She established her own dance studio in 1952.

In 1962, she was invited from Alvin Ailey to study with him in the United States. She also studied with Martha Graham, Donald McKayle, Jose Limon and Louis Horst. She appeared as a protagonist in McKayle's Legendary Landscape, and premiered Ailey's Labyrinth and Suspension at the Brooklyn Academy of Music in the spring of 1963.

Mariko had choreographed multiple pieces and has performed in New York City; her works that have been reviewed by The New York Times include Dance Opinion in 1968, Bird in 1976, and Voice VI in 1985. She has also performed in Tel Aviv, and Japan.

== Awards ==
In 1966, Mariko was awarded by the Japan Ballet and Music Critics Association, the first woman and first dancer to receive this honor, and received a Fulbright scholarship to study in the United States With Martha Graham. In 1968, she was awarded the Art Encouragement Prize at the Agency for Cultural Affairs (ACA) National Arts Festival in Japan. In the same year, she was awarded the best performing artist in modern dance by the Ongaku Shinbun Newspaper, and the 10th Annual Dance Award from Dance Critics Club in Japan.
