= Mariko Kusumoto =

Japanese designer

- Born: 1967; Kumamoto, Japan
- Known for: textile art, metal art
- Website: marikokusumoto.com

Mariko Kusumoto (b. 1967, Kumamoto, Japan) is an artist known for textile art and metal art. She studied at the Musashino Art University in Tokyo. She relocated to the United States where she studied at the Academy of Art University in San Francisco. She is based in Massachusetts. In 2010 her work was the subject of a solo exhibition entitled Mariko Kusumoto: Unfolding Stories which toured the United States at the Fuller Craft Museum, the Racine Art Museum, the Society for Contemporary Craft, and the Morikami Museum. In 2019 she exhibited at the Museum of Arts and Design.

Kusumoto's work is in the collection of the Victoria and Albert Museum, and the Los Angeles County Museum of Art.

Her work, Seascape 1, was acquired by the Smithsonian American Art Museum as part of the Renwick Gallery's 50th Anniversary Campaign.
