= Méry-la-Bataille =

- Commune
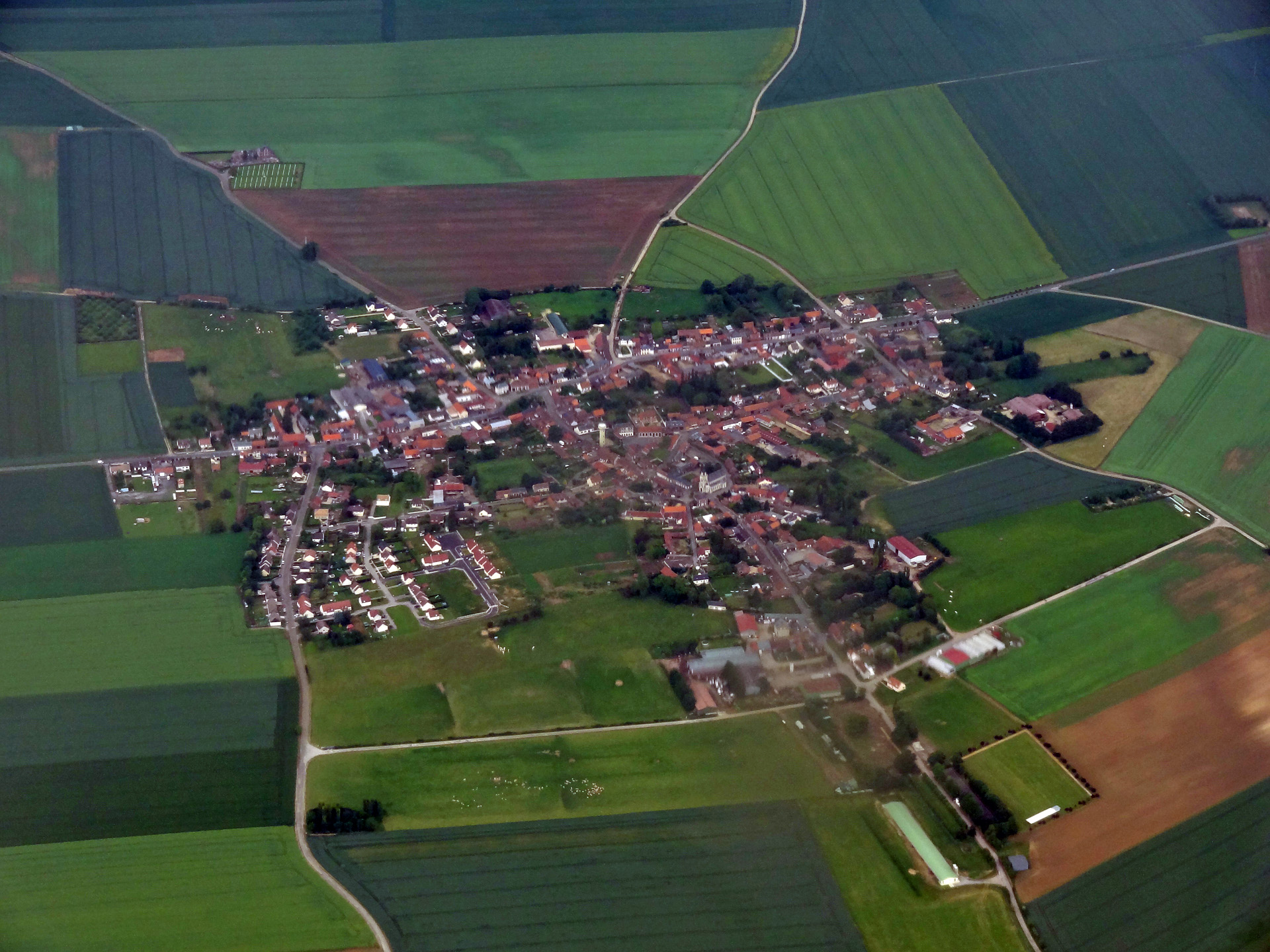
- An aerial view of Méry-la-Bataille

- Coat of arms
- Location of Méry-la-Bataille
- Location within France Location within Hauts-de-France
- Coordinates: 49°32′47″N 2°37′48″E
- Country: France
- Region: Hauts-de-France
- Department: Oise
- Arrondissement: Clermont
- Canton: Estrées-Saint-Denis
- Intercommunality: Plateau Picard

Government
  - Mayor (2020–2026): Isabelle Da Silva-Graczyk
- Area^{1}: 11.26 km^{2} (4.35 sq mi)
- Elevation: 134 m (440 ft)
- Highest elevation: 129 m (423 ft)
- Lowest elevation: 72 m (236 ft)
- Population (2023): 604
  - Density: 53.6/km^{2} (139/sq mi)
- Time zone: UTC+01:00 (CET)
  - Summer (DST): UTC+02:00 (CEST)
- INSEE/Postal code: 60396 /60420
- ^{1} French Land Register data, which excludes lakes, ponds, glaciers > 1 km^{2} (0.386 sq mi or 247 acres) and river estuaries.

Méry-la-Bataille (French pronunciation: [meʁi la bataj]) is a commune in the Oise department in northern France.

== History ==
Méry took the name of Méry-la-Bataille in 1932. The name of Méry is on the statue of general Mangin near the church Saint-François-Xavier in Paris.

== See also ==
- Communes of the Oise department
