= Maari (soundtrack) =

2015 soundtrack album by Anirudh Ravichander

- Maari album cover

Soundtrack album by Anirudh Ravichander
- Released: 7 June 2015
- Recorded: 2015
- Genre: Feature film soundtrack
- Length: 15:15
- Language: Tamil
- Label: Sony Music India
- Producer: Anirudh Ravichander

Anirudh Ravichander chronology
| Kaaki Sattai (2014) | Maari (2015) | Naanum Rowdy Dhaan (2015) |

Maari is the soundtrack album for the 2015 Tamil film of the same name, starring Dhanush and Kajal Aggarwal in the lead roles, directed by Balaji Mohan. The soundtrack album was composed by Anirudh Ravichander, with three songs written by Dhanush, and the rest of the songs written by Vignesh Shivan and G. Rokesh. The film marks the third collaboration between Dhanush and Anirudh Ravichander. The audio rights were purchased by Sony Music India and the soundtrack album was released on 7 June 2015, receiving positive reception.

== Background ==
Maari's soundtrack and score is composed by Anirudh Ravichander in his third collaboration with Dhanush after 3 (2012) and Velaiilla Pattadhari (2014), and first with Mohan; previously Anirudh was supposed to collaborate with Mohan for Vaayai Moodi Pesavum before he had opted out of the project. Anirudh began composing the film's music by March 2015. The recording of the songs progressed for two months, with folk and dappankuthu numbers were prioritised owing to the rustic setting. Anirudh also composed mass themes based on the character's image. In mid-May, Dhanush revealed the lyrics of the titular track which had significance to the pigeon racing themes. He had written three songs for the album, while the rest of the songs were written by Vignesh Shivan and Rokesh. Malayalam actor-singer Vineeth Srinivasan has also sung a number "Oru Vidha Aasai" which was not included in the film.

== Release ==
The film's music rights were purchased by Sony Music India. Initially, the film's audio was scheduled to be launched on 25 May 2015, but the album was eventually launched on the midnight of 7 June 2015. A teaser from one of the songs and the theme music were unveiled closer to the film's theatrical release.

== Reception ==
Sharanya CR of The Times of India claimed that "the album sounds less Anirudh and more local". Vipin Nair of Music Aloud rated the album 7 out of 10, and stated that "Out-and-out dancy soundtrack from Anirudh. And an engaging one at that." Karthik Srinivasan of Milliblog called it a "so-so" album, except for the two songs "Don'u Don'u Don'u" and "Oru Vidha Aasai" which he considered the best from the album; he reviewed the former as a "captivating call-and-response duet featuring Anirudh and Alisha Thomas" and the latter as "a wonderfully articulated 80s swagger".

Sify rated the album 3 out of 5, and stated that "Although the album sticks to the genre it promised, the tunes coupled with jarring arrangements make this album sound monotonous. Tracks like 'Maari Thara Local' & 'Donu Donu' work like typical Anirudh tracks but the catchiness is missing in the remaining tracks. One hopes that the album grows among listeners with repeated listening. Would probably go down as Anirudh's weakest album till date." Lakshmikanth Jaganmohan of Rediff.com stated that "the album will appeal to Gen Y [youngsters]". Aditya Iyer of Hindustan Times wrote "Apart from Oru Vidhu Aasai, Maari's soundtrack doesn't hold any surprises for those familiar with Anirudh's signature Thara Local sound. It is, nonetheless, fun and peppy. If the film is anything like its music, it promises to be an entertaining ride."

== Track listing ==
| No. | Title | Lyrics | Singer(s) | Length |
|---|---|---|---|---|
| 1. | "Maari Thara Local" | Dhanush | Dhanush, Anirudh Ravichander | 3:50 |
| 2. | "Oru Vidha Aasai" | Dhanush | Vineeth Sreenivasan | 3:11 |
| 3. | "Don'u Donu'u Don'u" | Dhanush | Anirudh Ravichander, Alisha Thomas | 3:15 |
| 4. | "Bagulu Odayam Dagulu Mari" | Rokesh | Dhanush | 1:06 |
| 5. | "The Maari Swag" | — | Instrumental | 0:30 |
| 6. | "Thappa Dhaan Theriyum" | Vignesh Shivan | Dhanush, Chinna Ponnu, Magizhini Manimaaran | 3:20 |
| Total length: | | | | 15:15 |

== Accolades ==
| Awards | Date of ceremony (Note: Date is linked to the article about the awards held that year, wherever possible.) | Category | Recipient(s) and nominee(s) | Result | Ref. |
|---|---|---|---|---|---|
| Filmfare Awards South | 18 June 2016 | Best Music Director – Tamil | Anirudh Ravichander | Nominated | |
| IIFA Utsavam | 24–25 January 2016 | Best Music Director – Tamil | Anirudh Ravichander | Nominated | |
| IIFA Utsavam | 24–25 January 2016 | Best Lyricist – Tamil | Dhanush – ("Don'u Don'u Don'u") | Won | |
| IIFA Utsavam | 24–25 January 2016 | Best Male Playback Singer – Tamil | Anirudh Ravichander – ("Don'u Don'u Don'u") | Nominated | |
