= Marri, Rajanpur District =

Marri
- Union Council
- ماڑی
- Location within Punjab, Pakistan Location within Pakistan
- Coordinates: 29°30′20″N 69°52′00″E
- Country: Pakistan
- Province: Punjab
- District: Rajanpur
- Elevation: 1,645.92 m (5,400.0 ft)
- Time zone: UTC+5 (PST)

Marri (Urdu: ماڑی) is a hill station in Rajanpur District in Punjab province of Pakistan. Its altitude Is 4800 ft cold weather in summer. Dragal mountain is an altitude of 5400 feet.
