= Mari language (disambiguation) =

The Mari language is a Uralic language spoken in parts of Russia.

Mari language may also mean:

- Mari language (Madang Province), an Austronesian language of Papua New Guinea
- Mari language (Sepik), a Papuan language of Papua New Guinea
- Mari, or Namo, one of the Nambu languages of Papua New Guinea
- One of the Maric languages of Australia

== See also ==
- Mari, Syria § People, language and government, for the languages spoken in the ancient Near Eastern city of Mari
