= William Merry =

William Merry may refer to:

- William Merry (priest) (1835–1918), English scholar and clergyman
- William L. Merry (1835–1911), American diplomat
- William E. Merry (1861–1941), American politician
- Bill Merry (William Gerald Merry, born 1955), English cricketer
