= José Mari =

José Mari may refer to:

- José Mari (footballer, born 1971), Spanish football midfielder
- José Mari (footballer, born 1978), Spanish football forward
- José Mari (footballer, born 1985), Spanish football leftback
- José Mari (footballer, born 1987), Spanish football defensive midfielder
- José Mari Bakero (born 1963), Spanish former professional footballer and current manager
- Jose Mari Chan (born 1945), Filipino singer, songwriter, businessman, and TV presenter
- Jose Mari Gonzales or José Mari (1938–2019), Filipino actor and politician
