= Airi =

- Gender: Female

Origin
- Origin: Japanese
- Meaning: Different meanings depending on the kanji used

Airi
- Gender: Female
- Name day: 2 December (Estonia); 4 December (Finland)

Origin
- Origin: Estonian, Finnish
- Meaning: Messenger, herald

Other names
- Related names: Aire, Aira

Airi is a feminine given name used in Estonian, Finnish and Japanese. The Japanese name can be written as 愛里, 愛李, 愛莉, 愛理, 愛梨, 藍梨 or あいり in hiragana. In Finnish and Estonian, the name is derived from airut, meaning messenger or herald. As of 1 January 2022, Airi is the 240th most popular feminine given name in Estonia.

Notable Japanese people with the name include:

- Airi Eino (永野 愛理; born 1993), Japanese voice actress and singer
- Airi Furukawa (古川 愛李; born 1989), Japanese illustrator and former singer
- Airi Hatakeyama (畠山 愛理; born 1994), Japanese rhythmic gymnast
- Airi Kinoshita (木下 あいり; 1998–2005), Japanese murder victim
- Airi Matsui (松井 愛莉; born 1996), Japanese model, actress, and former singer
- Airi Miyabe (宮部 藍梨; born 1998), Japanese volleyball player
- Airi Nakajima (中島 愛里; born 1990), Japanese actress and gravure idol
- Airi Shimizu (清水 あいり; born 1992), Japanese gravure idol, actress and television personality
- Airi Shikawa (白川愛梨; born 1999), Japanese gravure idol and tallent
- Airi Suzuki (鈴木 愛理; born 1994), Japanese singer, actress, model and radio personality
- Airi Suzuki (violinist) (鈴木 愛理; born 1989), Japanese violinist
- Airi Taira (平 愛梨; born 1984), Japanese actress
- Airi Tanigawa (谷川 愛梨; born 1995), Japanese singer
- Airi Toriyama (通山 愛里; born 1989), Japanese actress and singer
- AiRI, Japanese singer

== Other people ==
- Airi L, British singer
- Airi Mikkelä (born 1993), Finnish badminton player

== Fictional characters ==
- Airi (アイリ), a character in the media franchise Queen's Blade
- Airi Ban, a character in the video game Devil Survivor 2
- Airi Hayashida, a character in the anime series Wake Up, Girls!
- Airi Masaki (柾木 アイリ), a character in the anime series Tenchi Muyo!
- Airi Momoi, a character from the game Hatsune Miku: Colorful Stage!
- Airi Nogami, a character in the tokusatsu series Kamen Rider Den-O
- Airi Sakura, a character in the light novel series Classroom of the Elite
- Airi Kurimura, a character in the role-playing video game Blue Archive
- Airi Amano, a character in the D4DJ franchise
