= Määri =

Village in Estonia

- Village
- Location in Estonia
- Coordinates: 59°05′N 26°25′E
- Country: Estonia
- County: Lääne-Viru County
- Parish: Väike-Maarja Parish
- Time zone: UTC+2 (EET)
  - Summer (DST): UTC+3 (EEST)

Määri (German: Meyris) is a village in Väike-Maarja Parish, Lääne-Viru County, in northeastern Estonia.

Werner Zoege von Manteuffel, surgeon and advisor to Russian emperor Nicholas II, (1857–1926) was born in Määri Manor.
