= Mery (ancient Egyptian name) =

mr r i i
Mery (one possible spelling)
in hieroglyphs

Mery or Meri and its feminine equivalent Meryt or Merit is an ancient Egyptian name meaning "beloved". It was common during the Old and Middle Kingdom, and very frequent during the New Kingdom. It was also used as a nickname.

- Merneith, consort of pharaoh Den of the First dynasty of Egypt.
- Mery, High Priest of Amun (18th dynasty)
- Mery, High Priest of Osiris (19th dynasty)
- Merit, wife of Kha; owners of Theban Tomb TT8
- Merit, wife of Maya, overseer of the treasuries during the reign of Tutankhamun (18th dynasty)
