= Mariko Nagai =

Japanese-born poet and writer (born 1974)

- Born: Tokyo, Japan
- Education: New York University
- Occupations: Poet and writer
- Writing career
- Language: English

Mariko Nagai is a Japanese-born poet and writer who writes in English. Although she was born in Japan, she grew up in Belgium, Japan, California, and Tennessee due to her father's job transfers. She received an undergraduate degree from Boston University, and later a graduate degree from New York University.

She is a Professor of creative writing and Japanese literature at Temple University, Japan Campus in Tokyo.

== Books ==
- Imaginary Death, punctum books, 2025
- Body of Empire, Tarpauline Sky Press, 2022
- Under the Broken Sky, Henry Holt & Co., 2019
- Irradiated Cities, Les Figues Press, 2017
- Dust of Eden, Albert Whitman & Co, 2014
- Instructions for the Living, Word Temple Press, 2012
- Georgic: Stories, BkMk Press / University of Missouri Kansas City, 2010
- History of Bodies: Poems, Red Hen Press, 2007

== Awards ==
- Erich Maria Remarque Fellowship from New York University
- Fellowships from the Rockefeller Foundation Bellagio Center and Akademie Schloss Solitude
- UNESCO-Aschberg Bursaries for the Arts
- Finalist in the 2010 Leapfrog Press Global Fiction Prize Contest for Weight of the Land
- Pushcart Prize for her poetry and fiction
- Benjamin Saltman Prize from Red Hen Press for Histories of Bodies
- G.S. Sharat Chandra Fiction Prize (2009) from BkMk Press for Georgic: Stories
