= Marri, Iran =

Marri, Iran or Mari, Iran or Meri, Iran may refer to:

- Mari, Khuzestan (مرعي)
- Meri, Mazandaran (مري)
- Marri, Semnan (مري)
- Mari, Zanjan (ماري)
