= Peter Merry =

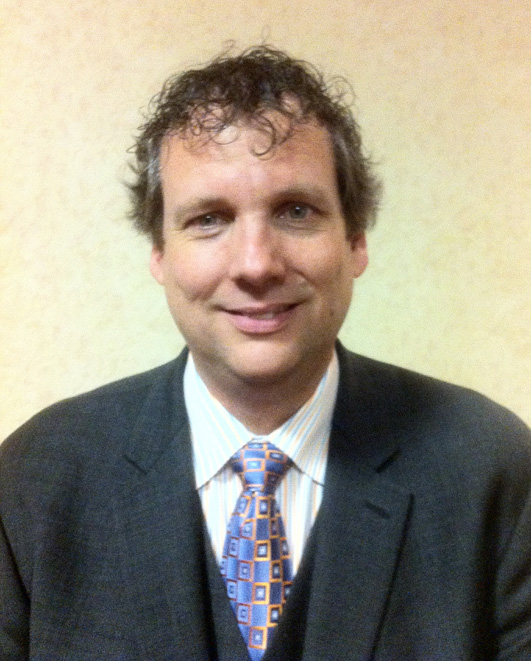
- Peter Merry, Mobile Beat Conference, Las Vegas, February 2, 2011
- Born: January 15, 1969 (age 57); Seattle, Washington
- Occupation: Wedding Entertainment Director
- Known for: "The Best Wedding Reception...Ever!"

Peter Merry (born January 15, 1969, in Seattle, Washington) is an American author, public speaker, and a DJ in the wedding entertainment industry. He served as the national president of the American Disc Jockey Association in 2003–2004, and is the founder and current CEO of the Wedding Entertainment Director's Guild.

== Background ==
Peter Charles Merry Jr. was educated in his church's private Christian school. His retired parents are serving in ministry in a church in Leon, Mexico. His entertainment background is varied and includes teaching classes at his church, serving as a morning host for Christian talk radio KBRT AM 740 in Los Angeles, and training to do stand-up comedy at The Improv in Irvine, California. In 1994 he started his own Wedding DJ company which was later to become Merry Weddings.

== Public speaker ==
Merry has presented seminars on wedding entertainment performance techniques, wedding marketing, sales consultation skills, and the value of ethics in business to wedding professionals in over 60 cities across the United States. The presentations have been to local chapters of the American Disc Jockey Association, and additionally to various professional trade associations and conferences, including: Wedding MBA Conference in Las Vegas, National Association of Catering Executives in Chicago, and Association of Bridal Consultants in Knoxville, Tennessee. His seminar topics include: "The Starbucks Effect", "The Six Pillars of Wedding Marketing", "Better Consultations Bring Better Bookings", and a two-day training seminar entitled, "The Professional Process".
