= Merrie =

Merrie can be a feminine given name or a surname. Notable people and fictional characters with the name include:

== Given name ==
- Merrie Amsterburg, American singer-songwriter
- Merrie Cherry (fl. 2021), 8th place contestant in The Boulet Brothers' Dragula season 4
- Merrie Kenwood, fictional burglar in the manga series Death Note
- Merrie Lee Soules, Democratic candidate for the 2016 US House of Representatives election from New Mexico's 2nd congressional district
- Merrie Spaeth, American public relations and political consultant

== Surname ==
- Alex Merrie (1905–1985), Scottish football forward
- Chris Merrie (born 1998), English football midfielder

== See also ==
- Merrie Melodies, comedy short film series within the Looney Tunes franchise
- Merrie Monarch Festival, annual weeklong festival in Hilo, Hawaii, U.S.
- Merry (disambiguation)
