= Mayuka =

Mayuka may refer to

== People with the given name ==
- Mayuka, a member of the girl group NiziU
- Mayuka Nomura (野村 真悠華, born 1989), Japanese voice actress
- Mayuka Thaïs (born 1979), American singer-songwriter, artist, voice over artist and art educator
- Mayuka Yamamoto (山本 茉由佳, born 2000), Japanese swimmer
- Emmanuel Mayuka (born 1990), Zambian football striker

== Fictional characters ==
- Mayuka, a character from the anime series RErideD: Derrida, who leaps through time
- Mayuka, a character from the manga series Tenchi Muyo!
- Mayuka Korenaga, a character from the manga series Strobe Edge
- Mayuka Kondō, a character from the manga series I Don't Like You at All, Big Brother!!
