= List of Cardcaptor Sakura: Clear Card episodes =

Cardcaptor Sakura: Clear Card
- Cover of the first Blu-ray volume
- No. of episodes: 22

Release
- Original network: NHK BS Premium
- Original release: January 7 – June 10, 2018

Season chronology
- ← Previous; Cardcaptor Sakura

Cardcaptor Sakura: Clear Card is a Japanese anime television series based on the manga series of the same name written and illustrated by the manga artist group Clamp. It is a sequel to Cardcaptor Sakura and focuses on Sakura Kinomoto in junior high school. After the Sakura Cards turn blank and are rendered powerless, Sakura and her friends begin a quest to discover and capture the transparent cards using a new and much stronger mystical key and incantation to transform said key into the Dream Wand. Like the original series, Cardcaptor Sakura: Clear Card is directed by Morio Asaka, the screenplay written by Nanase Ohkawa of Clamp and animated and produced by Madhouse. The original main Japanese cast also return to reprise their roles.

An original video animation titled Sakura and the Two Bears, which was a more faithful adaptation of the end of the original manga but noncanonical to the anime, had its world premiere at Anime Expo on July 1, 2017, and shipped in Japan as a DVD bundled with the special edition of volume 3 of the manga on September 13, 2017. The 22-episode television series aired from January 7 to June 10, 2018, on NHK BS Premium. Crunchyroll simulcasted the series with English subtitles, and Funimation simuldubbed the series on FunimationNow. From episodes 1 to 12, the opening theme is "Clear" by Maaya Sakamoto, and the ending theme is "Jewelry" by Saori Hayami. From episode 13 onwards the opening theme is "Rocket Beat" by Kiyono Yasuno and the ending theme is "Rewind" by Minori Suzuki.

== Episode list ==
No.	Title (Note: Similar to the previous series, each episode title contains the word "Sakura" (さくら, Sakura), representing the name of the protagonist of this series, Sakura Kinomoto.)	Directed by	Original release date
0	"Cardcaptor Sakura: Clear Card Prologue: Sakura and the Two Bears"; Transliteration: "Kādokyaputā Sakura Kuria Kādo-hen Purorōgu Sakura to Futatsu no Kuma" (Japanese: カードキャプターさくら クリアカード編 プロローグ さくらとふたつのくま)	Tetsuo Ichimura	September 13, 2017
After Eriol announces that he is returning to England, Syaoran confesses to Sakura that he loves her, but she refrains from answering. She struggles to understand her feelings; realizing that they are different to what she felt for Yukito. Sakura and Syaoran then pay one final visit to Eriol and his friends before their departure, and Syaoran tells her that he is also returning to Hong Kong. Sakura then rushes to make a teddy bear for him, realizing what she feels for Syaoran, and with Toya's help reaches Syaoran in time to give it to him, revealing to Syaoran that she also loves him. As the bus begins to leave, Syaoran promises to return to Tomoeda when he is finished with his business in Hong Kong, and Sakura promises to wait for him. Two years later, on Sakura's first day as a junior high school student, she happily reunites with Syaoran. Note: This special serves as a prologue to the manga rather than the anime; adapting the ending of the original manga series along with several events from the last 5 chapters.
1	"Sakura and the Clear Cards"; Transliteration: "Sakura to Tōmei na Kādo" (Japanese: さくらと透明なカード)	Kunio Wakabayashi	January 7, 2018
On Sakura and her friends' first day at Tomoeda Junior High School, Sakura rejoices upon meeting Syaoran again and learning from him that he has finished his business in Hong Kong and has moved back to Tomoeda for good. Sakura joyfully hugs Syaoran, happily stating that they can now be together forever, and Syaoran responds affirming this. Later that night, after a strange dream, Sakura discovers that all the Sakura cards have turned blank. After consulting with Yue, Syaoran and Tomoyo, and with no answer from Eriol, Sakura has another dream where she receives a key which remains on her hand when she wakes up. On her way to school the next day, Sakura is attacked with powerful winds. She transforms the new key into a new, more powerful staff that she uses to capture the winds as a new card with a transparent design called "Gale".
2	"Sakura and the Room with No Exit"; Transliteration: "Sakura to Deguchi no Nai Heya" (Japanese: さくらと出口のない部屋)	Tetsuo Ichimura	January 14, 2018
During Tomoyo's visit at her house, Sakura, Tomoyo, and Kero become trapped in a closed space. As Tomoyo uses one of her sewing needles to burst it, Sakura uses her staff to capture it the "Siege." That night, she has another dream with the cloaked figure, who attempts to steal her key.
3	"Sakura's Heavy Rain Alert"; Transliteration: "Sakura no Ōame Chūihō" (Japanese: さくらの大雨注意報)	Mitsutaka Noshitani	January 21, 2018
A heavy downpour persists throughout the day, and Sakura captures the card "Aqua." The next day, during Cheerleading Club, Sakura captures the card "Reflect." At home, she meets the cloaked figure in a dream and once again tries to stop it from stealing her key.
4	"Sakura and the Lovely Transfer Student"; Transliteration: "Sakura to Suteki na Tenkōsei" (Japanese: さくらと素敵な転校生)	Daisuke Chikushi	January 28, 2018
Akiho Shinomoto, a student from abroad, transfers to the school, and quickly become friends with Sakura and the others. Later at class, Sakura discovers that the trees at the school grounds are moving by themselves and she captures the card "Action." After school, Sakura meets Yue, who tells her that he can't sense any magic from the new cards. Syaoran contacts Eriol, but he is instructed not to act until the time is right.
5	"Sakura Feels a Pull at the Flower Viewing"; Transliteration: "Sakura to o hanami hippari-dako" (Japanese: さくらとお花見ひっぱりだこ)	Hideki Hosokawa	February 4, 2018
Sakura meets her friends for the Flower Viewing, where she is suddenly dragged away by a mysterious force to a large tree in the middle of the forest. She captures the card "Gravitation." Admiring how huge and beautiful the tree is, Sakura convinces her friends to continue their meeting beside it as Syaoran arrives to join them.
6	"Sakura, the Rabbit and the Song of the Moon"; Transliteration: "Sakura to Usagi to Tsuki no Uta" (Japanese: さくらとうさぎと月の唄)	Yūki Nishihata	February 11, 2018
Sakura dreams of the cloaked figure again, now sitting atop a clock. The next day, Sakura and her friends borrow the music room during lunch break to hear Akiho and Tomoyo sing together. Syaoran is revealed to know how to play the piano. After the song, Sakura hears a strange noise captures the card "Record", while Syaoran affirms that he had not felt any magic power in the occasion.
7	"Sakura and a Game of Tag in the Garden"; Transliteration: "Sakura to Oniwa de Onigokko" (Japanese: さくらとお庭でおにごっこ)	Kunio Wakabayashi	February 18, 2018
Sakura, Kero and Syaoran pay a visit to Tomoyo's house so they can test the powers of Record in the garden. In the occasion she finds a new card called "Flight" and captures it.
8	"Sakura, the Clock, and a Hide-and-Seek Game"; Transliteration: "Sakura to Tokei to Kakurenbo" (Japanese: さくらと時計とかくれんぼ)	Masayuki Iimura	February 25, 2018
Sakura and Tomoyo are invited by Akiho to pay a visit to her new house, which by coincidence is the same mansion where Eriol lived during his stay in Tomoeda, where they are introduced to her butler, Yuna D. Kaito and Akiho shows them her family's vast, personal library. In the occasion, Sakura locates card "Lucid", hidden among the booksheves and capture it. Once Akiho returns, she shows a book in a mysterious language called "Alice in Clock Land" and Sakura can't shake the feeling that the cover's design is somewhat familiar.
9	"Sakura's Thrilling Aquarium Visit"; Transliteration: "Sakura no Dokidoki Suizokukan" (Japanese: さくらのドキドキ水族館)	Tetsuo Ichimura	March 4, 2018
Sakura invites Syaoran for a date, the first date they've been on since they became a couple, at the same aquarium where she captured the Watery. At the aquarium, Syaoran tries to build up the courage to ask Sakura out on a date himself but then one of the tanks breaks, flooding the entire room. Sakura ends up trapped underwater by the force of a card until Toya drains the water and Syaoran rescues her. Sakura, along with Tomoyo, Kero, and Syaoran, return to the aquarium at night, where she captures the card "Spiral."
10	"Sakura and the Sleep Labyrinth"; Transliteration: "Sakura to Nemuri no Rabirinsu" (Japanese: さくらとねむりのラビリンス)	Toshiaki Kamihara	March 11, 2018
Akiho is paying a visit to Sakura's home when she is put to sleep by the powers of another card. Sakura and Kero chase after it, until they discover that the entire house is surrounded by an intricate labyrinth. After a long chase, Sakura captures the cards "Snooze" and "Labyrinth". After everything gets back to normal, Kaito appears to pick up Akiho and Sakura bids farewell to them.
11	"Sakura and the Upside-Down Penguin"; Transliteration: "Sakura to Sakasama Pengin" (Japanese: さくらとさかさまペンギン)	Toshihiro Kikuchi	March 18, 2018
On their way home from school, Sakura, Tomoyo, Akiho and Syaoran meet Kaito who is returning from shopping. Once back home, Syaoran contacts Eriol, revealing that he sensed some magical power from Kaito, and Eriol suspects him to be a powerful member of an English magician society of dubious repute. Sometime later, Sakura feels the presence of a card and they follow it to the nearby playground where they capture the card "Reversal" with success.
12	"Sakura and the Ice Ball-Sports Tournament"; Transliteration: "Sakura to Kōri no Kyūgi Taikai" (Japanese: さくらと氷の球技大会)	Hideki Hosokawa	March 25, 2018
Sakura and her friends participate of the school's sports tournament when a sudden hailstorm occurs. With help from Syaoran, Sakura captures the card "Hail" which is the source of the storm. Later at home, Sakura dreams of the cloaked figure, who is trying to take her key again.
13	"Sakura and Meiling's Return"; Transliteration: "Sakura to Tadaima Meirin" (Japanese: さくらとただいま苺鈴)	Masaharu Tomoda	April 8, 2018
Meiling arrives suddenly in Tomoeda and Sakura receives her in her house. Meanwhile, Yukito and Yue ask Toya about the new power that is growing within him, but Toya claims that it is not the time to reveal it yet. Back at her house, Sakura reveals to Meiling that she knows that Syaoran is hiding something from her, but refrains from asking him about it because she is certain he would not keep secrets from her unless for a good reason. After Meiling reassures her about Syaoran's feelings, the two then prepare to sleep, when Sakura briefly notices some cat ears and tail appearing on Meiling's body. Meanwhile, Akiho confesses to Kaito that she can now read further in her book, and tells him of an event from the book that is strikingly similar to the current situation with Sakura and Meiling.
14	"Sakura, the Shrine and the Zoo"; Transliteration: "Sakura to Jinja to Dōbutsuen" (Japanese: さくらと神社と動物園)	Daisuke Takashima	April 15, 2018
In the following day, Sakura and her friends gather to visit a shrine, where she sees her friends being turned into animals and transported to a mysterious location. Just as her friends were about to be in harm's way, Syaoran appears to help Sakura, who uses the power of her own will to transport everybody back, and succeeds in capturing the card "Mirage". With Syaoran exhausted from the battle, Sakura concludes that the card acted based on her own thoughts and feelings, and decides that the only way to stop these incidents from happening is by getting much stronger.
15	"Sakura's Nostalgic Viewing Party"; Transliteration: "Sakura no Omoide Kanshōkai" (Japanese: さくらのおもいで鑑賞会)	Kunio Wakabayashi	April 22, 2018
Akiho tells Kaito about how glad she was being able to read more of the book, describing the events which occurred with Alice's friends turning into animals, much like Sakura's encounter with the "Mirage" card. Kaito replies cryptically that he hopes Alice will continue to do her best. At Sakura's house, Meiling calls Syaoran on her behalf to check on his health, with Sakura eventually asking him to have adequate rest. Later, Sakura, Meiling and Akiho arrive at Tomoyo's house as she had something to show them: her personal home theater room, where she plays footage from previous plays which Sakura and the others acted in. Akiho enjoys seeing Sakura on stage, but Sakura curls up in her chair; highly embarrassed at seeing herself on film. Halfway through the viewing session, an earthquake shook the house. Using "Snooze" to put Akiho, Tomoyo's mother and her bodyguards to sleep, Sakura and Kero fly above the house to investigate the cause.
16	"Sakura and Meiling's Friend"; Transliteration: "Sakura to Meiling no o Tomodachi" (Japanese: さくらと苺鈴のおともだち)	Masayuki Iimura	April 29, 2018
Sakura and Kero discover the source of the earthquakes to be a card that is moving underground and prevent it from escaping with Siege, before capturing the card "Swing". After parting ways with Sakura and the others, Akiho meets Kaito on her way home, and as they talk, Kaito lets slip that he knows more about Sakura's father than he should, using his powers to rewind time and make her forget it. On their way home, Sakura and Meiling are attacked by another card and join forces to restrain its movements before capturing the card "Struggle". Before returning to Hong Kong, Meiling and Sakura agree to address each other without honorifics as a sign of their closeness, and as she proceeds to the airport, Meiling contacts Syaoran. Doubting Syaoran's love for Sakura and desire to be with her, she says to Syaoran that she doesn't know what his reasons for returning to Tomoeda are and what is going on, but states that she will not forgive him if anything happens to him, as Sakura would be the saddest if did.
17	"Sakura and the Crazy Sweets"; Transliteration: "Sakura to Okashina Okashi" (Japanese: さくらとおかしなお菓子)	Yūki Nishihata	May 6, 2018
Sakura has another dream with the mysterious figure and has a feeling that she finally figured out its identity. During home economic class, the roll cakes start jumping around and fuse into a large monster. Sakura defeats it and captures the card "Appear." Upon returning home, Akiho gives a roll cake to Kaito, who magically puts her to sleep and declares that he shall take all of the Clear Cards from Sakura, with assistance from Momo, when the time is right.
18	"Sakura, the Fire and Water Bird"; Transliteration: "Sakura to Honoō to Mizunotori" (Japanese: さくらと炎と水の鳥)	Tetsuo Ichimura	May 13, 2018
After showing to Akiho and the others the picture book she got from Rika, Sakura and Akiho have another shared dream. Meanwhile, with Syaoran's help, Sakura manages to capture the card "Blaze" and rushes back home, unaware that Toya has already realized that she is not in her room. Yue inquires Toya again about the new powers he obtained, but Toya insists that the time to reveal them has not arrived yet.
19	"Sakura and Akiho's Lullaby"; Transliteration: "Sakura to Akiho no Komoriuta" (Japanese: さくらと秋穂の子守唄)	Akira Katō	May 20, 2018
Sakura and Akiho take part in a reading session of Buying Mittens for children, and upon returning home, Sakura reveals that she used "Record" in the occasion. However, upon playing what the card recorded, an unfamiliar scene appears. After some investigation, Kero discovers that the scene Sakura recorded was from decades ago, as a sign that her powers had increased to an astonishing level, and after confiding in Yue, they decide that they must contact Eriol at any cost.
20	"Sakura, Rainbows, and Grandpa"; Transliteration: "Sakura to Niji to Ojiisan" (Japanese: さくらと虹とおじいさん)	Naoki Hishikawa	May 27, 2018
Sakura's maternal great-grandfather Masaki invites her and Syaoran to his villa one Sunday. When introducing Syaoran to Masaki, Sakura nearly tells Masaki that Syaoran is her boyfriend but gets embarrassed and tongue-tied. Masaki invites Syaoran as he is curious to know what his great-granddaughter's boyfriend is like and see if he would be a suitable future husband for Sakura. While talking to Syaoran, Masaki is left impressed by him. When Sakura takes a short leave to get more tea, she stumbles upon her mother's room and uses "Record" to view scenes of Nadeshiko (her own mother) when she was a child. Suddenly, Nadeshiko's image urges her to stop, stating that Sakura will not be able to return if she delves any further. Sakura and Akiho then have another shared dream, and both Kaito and Momo claim that the time they are waiting for is at hand. Meanwhile, Eriol finally contacts Kero and Yue to explain the situation to them.
21	"Sakura, the Mirror and the Key of Memories"; Transliteration: "Sakura to Kagami to Omoide no Kagi" (Japanese: さくらと鏡と思い出の鍵)	Hideki Hosokawa	June 3, 2018
After Sakura recovers, her great-grandfather gives her a key originated from England, that according to him, was one of Nadeshiko's most prized possessions. Meanwhile, Kero and Yue are informed by Eriol that he discovered with help from Syaoran's mother that Kaito was expelled from the society of magicians he once belonged to after being held responsible for the disappearance of a mysterious relic with strong magical powers, and somehow it must be a key element in his plan. Their conversation is then interrupted by Kaito, who cuts the communication between them with his own magical powers. Once returning home with Syaoran, Sakura realizes that her house was reversed by the power of a card, and captures the card "Mirror".
22	"Sakura's Clear Cards"; Transliteration: "Sakura no Tōmei na Kādo" (Japanese: さくらの透明なカード)	Kunio Wakabayashi	June 10, 2018
Despite having no idea of why Eriol wants to keep secret from Sakura about Akiho and Kaito, Kero and Yue decide to follow his instructions, with Kero standing guard beside Sakura to protect her. However, Sakura and Akiho's shared dreams become more frequent, and both have an ominous feeling about them. Later at night, the cloaked figure appears before Sakura and she confronts it. Just as her key and cards are about to be taken away, Sakura takes a glimpse of Akiho's face under the cloak. This causes Kaito to appear and rewind time once again, although he is certain that despite that, Sakura will eventually remember what happened.
