= Nankichi =

Nankichi may refer to:

- Nankichi Niimi (新美 南吉) (1913–1943), Japanese writer
- 5288 Nankichi, main-belt asteroid
