= Gon, the Little Fox =

Japanese children's story

- Author: Nankichi Niimi
- Original title: ごん狐 Gongitsune
- Translator: Mariko Shii Gharbi
- Illustrator: Genjirou Mita
- Language: Japanese
- Genre: Fable, Children's literature
- Published: 1932 in Akai Tori (The Red Bird) magazine (Miekichi Suzuki) (Japanese); 1995 (Kodansha International) (Japanese/English) (74p.); 2015 (Museyon)
- Publication place: Japan
- Media type: Print (paperback), (hardback)
- Pages: 36
- ISBN: 978-1940842035

Gon, the Little Fox (ごん狐, Gongitsune) is a Japanese children's story about the life of a little fox called Gon. The story is considered the masterpiece of Niimi Nankichi, also sometimes known as the Hans Christian Andersen of Japan.

== Synopsis ==
Gon (ごん) is a little fox. Looking for food he comes to a little village, where he repeatedly steals food and creates other mischief, constantly evading the angry villagers.

One day, Gon steals an eel in front of Hyoju (Japanese: 兵(ひょう)十(じゅう)), which Hyoju wanted to give to his sick old mother. His mother subsequently dies. Gon realizes his mistake and tries to make it up by secretly giving Hyoju gifts he stole, although the villagers now accuse Hyoju of stealing and beat him up. Afterwards, Gon only gives mushrooms and nuts he collected in the forest. Hyoju is grateful for the gifts, although he does not know where they come from. One day, Hyoju sees the fox sneaking around, and shoots him to death out of anger about the death of his mother. Only afterward does he realize to his horror that the fox he just shot gave him all the mushrooms and nuts.

== Analysis ==
In this story, Hyoju's mother dies, Gon gets shot by Hyoju while trying to make up for his errors, and Hyoju feels guilty for shooting the fox that was trying to help him. The moral is often interpreted that everybody has to accept their fate.

Foxes (see kitsune) are also seen in Japanese culture as magical and often mischievous animals. Some folk tales tell stories how foxes change shape to impersonate other beings and objects. Gon mimics humans on occasions, although there seem to be no magical powers involved.

The eel stolen by Gon may have accelerated or caused the death of Hyoju's mother. Dishes with eels have a reputation in Japan for providing strength, especially during the heat of the summer (see kabayaki).

== Author background ==
Nankichi wrote the story in 1930 when he was seventeen, based on a Japanese folk tale he heard. He wrote the story in Handa, Aichi prefecture, the town where he was born. He also lost his mother when he was 4 years old. Like Gon, Nankichi also did not live very long and died at age 29 of tuberculosis.

== Reception ==
Gon, The Fox received favorable reviews. Marilyn Taniguchi writing for the School Library Journal described it as a "poignant tale (that) will resonate with older readers, who will empathize with the struggles of a lonely outsider." and suggested "Teachers will also appreciate the glimpse into Japan’s rich culture." Kirkus Reviews wrote "A lot of information about Japanese culture and custom is imparted in the course of this telling," and commented "(Illustrator Genjirou) Mita’s beautiful and delicate original watercolors offer readers’ eyes large and lovely resting places as they make their ways through this long tale." concluding "The startling and violent ending may make it difficult to find an audience, but it is a valuable introduction to a non-Western storytelling aesthetic." JQ Magazine called it "a valuable read for young people".

== Adaption ==
The book was made into an animated movie Gongitsune (ごんぎつね) with Mayumi Tanaka as the voice of Gon. The movie premiered in March 1985. It was directed by Kôsei Maeda.

In 2019, TECARAT STUDIO released a stop motion short film adaptation of Gongitsune. The film was directed by Takeshi Yashiro. Masato Tanaka was the voice of Gon.
