= List of Cardcaptor Sakura episodes =

Cardcaptor Sakura
- No. of episodes: 70

Release
- Original network: NHK BS2
- Original release: April 7, 1998 – March 21, 2000

Season chronology
- Next → Cardcaptor Sakura: Clear Card

The 70-episode Cardcaptor Sakura Japanese anime television series is based on the manga series written and illustrated by the manga artist group Clamp. Cardcaptor Sakura is directed by Morio Asaka and animated and produced by Madhouse. The series focuses on Sakura Kinomoto, a fourth-grade elementary school student who discovers that she possesses magical powers after accidentally freeing a set of magical cards from the book in which they had been sealed for years. She is tasked with retrieving those cards in order to avoid an unknown catastrophe from befalling the world.

The episodes are spread over three seasons: the first season contained 35 episodes aired between April and December 1998, the second season contained 11 episodes aired between April and June 1999, and the third season contained 24 episodes aired between September 1999 and March 2000. The series was released by Bandai Visual to 18 VHS, LD and DVD compilation volumes between September 1998 and May 2000. Two Blu-ray Disc box set volumes were released by Geneon, one in March 2009 containing the first two seasons, and the second in June 2009 containing the third season. Three short, bonus original video animation (OVA) episodes were released with the first-print, limited edition versions of the VHS, LD and DVD releases.

Cardcaptor Sakura was initially licensed for the English-speaking market by Nelvana, which dubbed the full series into English and released it under the name Cardcaptors. In the US, the series only ran for 39 episodes, which were heavily edited and re-ordered. Geneon USA/Pioneer Family Entertainment released dubbed Cardcaptors episodes to nine VHS and DVD compilation volumes between November 2000 and July 2002. Pioneer Entertainment also released the uncut, unedited Cardcaptor Sakura series in its original Japanese form, with English subtitles to 18 DVD compilation volumes between November 2000 and November 2003. Pioneer also contracted with Nelvana to release the dubbed episodes. The Cardcaptor Sakura TV series DVDs went out-of-print at the end of 2006 when the license expired. Madman Entertainment released Cardcaptor Sakura in its uncut form in two DVD collection boxes in September 2012 and November 2012. NIS America re-released the entire series on DVD and Blu-ray in August 2014, featuring Japanese audio and an unedited English dub.

== Episode list ==
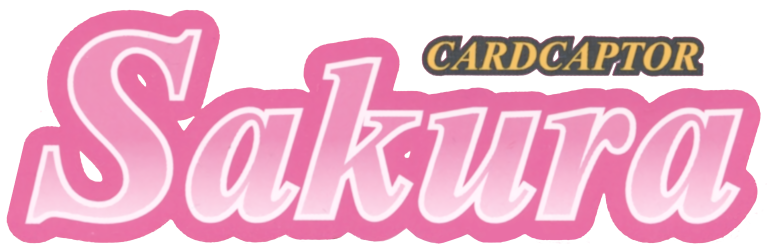
Pioneer US DVD Cardcaptor Sakura TV series logo

Cardcaptor Sakura is directed by Morio Asaka and animated and produced by Madhouse. Art direction is handled by Katsufumi Hariu and character design is done by Kumiko Takahashi. The chief writer for the series is Nanase Ohkawa of Clamp. The music is composed by Takayuki Negishi, with sound direction by Masafumi Mima.

The series contains 70 episodes spread over three seasons. Each episode title contains the word "Sakura" (さくら, Sakura), representing the name of the protagonist of this series, Sakura Kinomoto. The first season, consisting of 35 episodes, aired between April 7 and December 29, 1998, on Japanese satellite television channel NHK BS2. The second season, with 11 episodes, aired between April 6 and June 22, 1999. The third season, containing 24 episodes, aired between September 7, 1999, and March 21, 2000. The episodes were later released by Bandai Visual to 18 VHS, LD and DVD compilation volumes, each containing four episodes, though the first and twelfth volumes contain three episodes. The VHS/LD volumes were released between September 25, 1998, and May 25, 2000. The DVD volumes were released between September 25, 1999, and May 25, 2000. Six volumes of an abridged selection of the series titled Cardcaptor Sakura TV Series Selection were released on VHS between April 25 and June 25, 2001, containing 12 episodes. Three DVD box set volumes were released between April 1 and August 10, 2005, by Geneon Universal Entertainment. Two Blu-ray Disc box set volumes were released by Geneon, one on March 27, 2009, containing the first two seasons, and the second on June 26, 2009, containing the third season.

Three short, bonus original video animation (OVA) episodes were released with the first-print, limited edition versions of the VHS, LD and DVD releases. The first episode was released with volume one of the VHS and LD releases on September 25, 1998. The second episode came with volume ten of the VHS, LD and DVD releases on September 25, 1999. The third episode, also released on September 25, 1999, was with volume one of the DVD release.

Cardcaptor Sakura was initially licensed for the English-language market by Nelvana, which dubbed the series into English and released it under the name Cardcaptors. For the US broadcast, the heavily edited episodes were also reordered, with many left out completely. Although all 70 episodes (as well as the first film) were dubbed, in the US the series only ran for 39 episodes, changing the original episode order but finishing with the show's actual final episode. Potentially controversial material was removed, and the series was refocused to be more action-oriented to try to appeal to male viewers, as they were seen as the largest audience of animation at the time. Cardcaptors first aired in the United States on Kids' WB between June 17, 2000, and December 14, 2001. In the Kids' WB broadcast, the first episode aired was "Sakura's Rival", the eighth episode of the series, having removed episodes focusing on Sakura and to have the show start with Syaoran Li's arrival. In Nelvana's airing of the series in the United Kingdom in 2001 on Nickelodeon and CITV, the skipped episodes were restored, but other edits remained. The Cardcaptors dub, including the episodes skipped in the US broadcast, also aired in Australia on Network Ten and Cartoon Network (with an English cover of the first opening theme instead of the American one), in Ireland on RTÉ Network 2, and in Nelvana's native Canada on Teletoon (which also aired the episodes with a French dub on Télétoon). Animax created an English dub of the series as well, which it broadcast on its English-language networks in Southeast Asia and South Asia. The series was broadcast under its original name in Latin America and Spain. The Animax English dub later started streaming in the United States and Canada on Netflix in 2020.

Pioneer Entertainment released the first 27 US Cardcaptors episodes to nine VHS and DVD compilation volumes between November 14, 2000, and July 9, 2002; a planned tenth volume was cancelled in June 2002. It also released the unedited Cardcaptor Sakura series, with the original Japanese audio tracks and English subtitles, to 18 DVD compilation volumes between November 14, 2000, and November 11, 2003; the first 11 volumes were also released in VHS. Pioneer also contracted with Nelvana to release the dubbed episodes. The Cardcaptor Sakura TV series DVDs went out-of-print at the end of 2006 when the license expired. NIS America has licensed the Cardcaptor Sakura TV series and re-released the entire series with Japanese and unedited English audio on DVD and Blu-ray on August 5, 2014.

Madman Entertainment licensed the original Cardcaptor Sakura episodes in its uncut form with Japanese audio and English subtitles, and later released the series in two DVD box collections, one consisting of season one and the other consisting of seasons two and three. Each DVD box set contained the textless openings and endings of the series; the second DVD box set also contained an exclusive interview with Sakura Tange, Sakura Kinomoto's voice actress. The first DVD box collection was released in September 2012, and the second DVD box collection was released in November 2012.

Two pieces of theme music are used for each season: one opening theme and one ending theme. For the first season, the opening theme is "Catch You Catch Me" by Gumi, and the ending theme is "Groovy!" by Kohmi Hirose. For the second season, the opening theme is "Tobira o Akete" (扉をあけて) by Anza, and the ending theme is "Honey" by Chihiro. For the third season, the opening theme is "Platinum" by Maaya Sakamoto, and the ending theme is "Fruits Candy" by Megumi Kojima. The Cardcaptors English adaptation replaces the Japanese theme songs with an original song created for the adaptation, "Cardcaptors Theme", except in some countries such as Australia where the opening is the Japanese theme with English lyrics. In France and the United Kingdom, "Razzmatazz" by Froggy Mix is used for the second and third seasons. Eight insert theme songs are also used throughout Cardcaptor Sakura and are played during the episodes. These include: "Yoru no Uta" (夜の歌) by Junko Iwao (episodes 5, 23 and 59), "Hitorijime" (ヒトリジメ) by Gumi (episodes 34 and 40), "Tomo e" (友へ) by Iwao (episode 37), "Shiawase no Mahō" (しあわせの魔法) by Sakura Tange (episode 37), "Yasashisa no Tane" (やさしさの種子) by Iwao (episodes 37 and 49), "Prism" (プリズム) by Tange (episode 38), "Ki ni Naru Aitsu" (気になるアイツ) by Motoko Kumai (episode 57), and "Mienai Chizu" (見えない地図) by Anza (episode 68).

=== Season 1 (1998) ===
Org #	US #	Original title translated to English / Cardcaptors title	Directed by	Written by	Original airdate	US airdate	Canadian airdate
1	21 (Note: Episodes 1 and 41 of Cardcaptor Sakura are combined into US episode 21 of Cardcaptors (with the same title, "One Fateful Day", as episode 1 in other English-speaking territories).)	"Sakura and the Mysterious Magic Book" / "One Fateful Day"; Transliteration: "Sakura to Fushigi na Mahō no Hon" (Japanese: さくらと不思議な魔法の本)	Morio Asaka	Nanase Ohkawa	April 7, 1998	June 23, 2001	March 7, 2001
Sakura Kinomoto, a ten-year-old, experiences dreams involving a peculiar book and Tokyo Tower. After returning home from school, Sakura is drawn to the basement by strange noises. In her father's library, she discovers the Clow Book, the same book from her dream. She accidentally breaks its seal, unleashing the magical Clow Cards into the world. The cards' guardian, Cerberus, awakens and appoints Sakura the role of Cardcaptor - to catch and seal the cards using the Clow Wand. They successfully catch the Fly Card, allowing Sakura to fly.
2	—	"Sakura's Wonderful Friend" / "Partners in Crime"; Transliteration: "Sakura no Suteki na Otomodachi" (Japanese: さくらのすてきなお友達)	Yorimichi Nakano	Nanase Ohkawa	April 14, 1998	—	March 11, 2001
Tomoyo meets Cerberus after she discovers Sakura's secret and becomes involved in Sakura's quest. Cerberus gets given the nickname "Kero-chan", which will stick for the rest of the series. The next day, the students find the school's desks and equipment in large piles. Kero believes it was the work of a Clow Card and forces Sakura to go to school at night where she confronts the Shadow Card. Using Windy, Sakura is able to capture it. Sakura finally accepts her role as a Cardcaptor because of Tomoyo's support, who begins providing battle costumes for her to wear, as well as filming her endeavors.
3	16	"Sakura's Heart-Racing First Date" / "Allies"; Transliteration: "Sakura no Dokidoki Hatsu Dēto" (Japanese: さくらのドキドキ初デート)	Sunao Katabuchi	Nanase Ohkawa	April 21, 1998	November 18, 2000	January 14, 2001
Sakura's class is on a field trip to the aquarium. During the penguin show, something catches the trainer's leg and a penguin and pulls them into the water, but they are saved by Sakura's brother, Toya, who is working part-time there. At school, Tomoyo gives Sakura and Kero mobile phones and on the way home, Sakura bumps into Yukito who invites her on a casual "date" to the aquarium. While they are eating, the Watery Card attempts to drown Sakura. For the first time, Sakura has to formulate a plan to capture a card. Using her wits and an unintentional clue from Yukito, she lures Watery into a freezer to immobilize and capture it.
4	—	"Sakura's Tiring Sunday" / "An Unexpected Find"; Transliteration: "Sakura no Kutakuta Nichiyōbi" (Japanese: さくらのくたくた日曜日)	Nobuaki Nakanishi	Jirō Kaneko	April 28, 1998	—	March 18, 2001
While cleaning the house, Sakura finds two dormant Clow Cards, the Wood and the Rain. But while running an errand for her father, the two cards activate creating a jungle inside the house. Sakura uses Watery to capture the Rain Card and the gentle Wood Card yields on her own. Sakura gets the hard-earned lesson that a card is not fully subdued until she signs her name on it.
5	—	"Sakura, Panda, and a Cute Shop" / "Trouble at Twin Bells"; Transliteration: "Sakura to Panda to Kawaii Omise" (Japanese: さくらとパンダとかわいいお店)	Mamoru Kanbe	Hiroshi Ishii	May 5, 1998	—	March 25, 2001
On the way to school, Sakura meets Maki Matsumoto who is opening a shop called Twin Bells. Sakura and her friends visit the shop after school to find most of the merchandise still packed, so they offer to help. Chiharu Mihara, who has a fondness for stuffed animals, buys a stuffed panda, but it disappears shortly after taking it home. Sakura discovers the panda back in Twin Bells, and Maki explains that her business has been plagued by mysterious happenings that almost forced her to close down. While Tomoyo distracts Maki in the back, Sakura and Kero search the shop to find the Jump Card, which escapes with all the stuffed dolls in the shop. At Penguin Park, the Jump grows into a giant by absorbing the stuffed dolls, but it knocks itself out after it trips and falls allowing Sakura to capture it.
6	—	"Sakura and Memories of Her Mother" / "Seeing Is Believing"; Transliteration: "Sakura to Okaa-san no Omoide" (Japanese: さくらとおかあさんの思い出)	Akio Sakai	Nanase Ohkawa	May 12, 1998	—	April 1, 2001
Naoko informs Sakura and her friends of an encounter with a strange phantom in the woods behind the school. The girls investigate, encountering it as well, but all of them claim they saw something different. Sakura, Kero, and Tomoyo later return to the woods, where the phantom materializes as the ghost of Sakura's late mother Nadeshiko. However, it lures Sakura off a cliff, but she is rescued by Yukito, who comments that her mother would never put Sakura in danger. Sakura confronts the entity a second time, realising it is a Clow Card, which she seals, the culprit identified as the Illusion Card. Toya, who can see ghosts, sees his mother's spirit watching over Sakura.
7	23	"Sakura's First Attempt as a Thief" / "The Mysterious Painting"; Transliteration: "Sakura no Kaitō Hatsu Chōsen!?" (Japanese: さくらの怪盗初挑戦!?)	Kazunori Mizuno	Jirō Kaneko	May 19, 1998	July 7, 2001	April 8, 2001
On an art museum trip, Sakura witnesses a boy attempting to vandalize a painting. Before her eyes, the painting comes to life, silencing the room. Sakura, Tomoyo, and Kero later sneak into the museum to catch the Silent Card, encountering the boy, actually a girl named Yuki Tachibana, who claims her father created the painting which the Silent is inhabiting. Sakura tries to catch the card, but it continues to teleport the group out of the museum when they make noise. Using the Shadow Card, Sakura successfully catches the Silent, restoring the painting to normal.
8	1	"Sakura's Rival Appears" / "Sakura's Rival"; Transliteration: "Sakura no Raibaru, Tōjō!" (Japanese: さくらのライバル、登場!)	Sunao Katabuchi	Nanase Ohkawa	May 26, 1998	June 17, 2000	August 23, 2000
Sakura has the same reoccurring dream, specifically focusing on a boy wielding a sword in Chinese clothing. She hears from both Kero and Yukito that it might be a "foretelling dream". A new transfer student arrives from Hong Kong named Syaoran Li and is seated behind Sakura. During recess, he demands the Clow Cards from her but is scared off when Toya and Yukito appear. Kero explains to Sakura that Syaoran and the Li family are direct descendants of Clow Reed, the cards' creator. During a thunderstorm with no rain, Sakura encounters Syaoran who displays superior magical powers. Together, they are able to subdue the wolf-like Thunder Card, but Syaoran has no respect for Sakura.
9	5	"Sakura and the Mysterious Brooch" / "Double-Edged Sword"; Transliteration: "Sakura to Fushigi na Burōchi" (Japanese: さくらとふしぎなブローチ)	Mamoru Kanbe	Nanase Ohkawa	June 2, 1998	July 15, 2000	August 27, 2000
Sakura is left forlorn by Syaoran's confidence and superior skill. Rika and Tomoyo take Sakura to a shop to try to cheer her up. The three each buy brooches and return to Sakura's house for tea and pudding. When Rika puts on her brooch, actually the Sword Card, it possesses her and attacks Sakura. Syaoran saves Sakura who refuses to attack Rika, preventing him from doing so as well. Using the Illusion Card to distract Rika, Sakura is given the chance to capture the Sword. The next day, Syaoran is dismayed when he sees Sakura offer a gift of chocolate to Yukito, and quickly gives sweets of his own. Tomoyo has to explain to Sakura that Syaoran is "interested" in Yukito just like Sakura is.
10	—	"Sakura and the Sports Day of Flowers" / "An Unexpected Reunion"; Transliteration: "Sakura to Hana no Undōkai" (Japanese: さくらと花の運動会)	Akio Sakai	Hiroshi Ishii	June 16, 1998	—	May 27, 2001
During Sports Day, Sakura meets Tomoyo's mother, Sonomi Daidōji, for the first time. When Sonomi and Sakura's father, Fujitaka, meet, both are shocked. From their conversation, it is revealed that Sonomi is a first cousin to Sakura's mother and she blames Fujitaka for her death, though not in any direct way. While Sonomi and Fujitaka race in the parent's race, there is a downpour of flower petals. Sakura finds the merry Flower Card on the roof spreading the petals and captures her. She cools tension between Fujitaka and Sonomi by leaving them nadeshiko flowers.
11	—	"Sakura, Tomoyo, and a Mansion" / "The Special Box"; Transliteration: "Sakura to Tomoyo to Ōkina Ouchi" (Japanese: さくらと知世と大きなお家)	Junichi Sakata	Nanase Ohkawa	June 23, 1998	—	September 9, 2001
Sakura is invited to Tomoyo's home for the first time. She is shocked to find Tomoyo's house to be an elaborate mansion with maids. Sonomi rushes over when she hears of Sakura's visit and shares the memories of Nadeshiko with Sakura over tea. While Sonomi is taking care of business over the phone, Tomoyo presents her mother's prized jewelry box to Sakura, demonstrating how the key is rejected when she tries to unlock it. Kero suspects it is the Shield Card's doing. Sakura uses the Sword Card to slice away the protective barrier of the Shield and captures it. Inside the box is a dried bouquet of cherry blossoms from Sakura's mother's wedding and the first present Sakura ever gave Tomoyo, an eraser shaped like a bunny.
12	2	"Sakura's Never-Ending Day" / "Time and Again"; Transliteration: "Sakura no Owara nai Ichinichi" (Japanese: さくらの終わらない一日)	Mamoru Kanbe	Jirō Kaneko	June 30, 1998	June 24, 2000	September 3, 2000
Fujitaka is invited to Sakura's school to talk about his occupation and discuss archeology. Syaoran is entranced and becomes an instant fan until he discovers that Fujitaka is Sakura's father. The next day, Sakura has a recorder test but fails to hit a couple of notes. She falls asleep disappointed but is awakened by the elementary school's clock tower bell at midnight. Sakura is confused the next day when everything from the previous day happens again. This time, she is approached by Syaoran who explains it might be the work of the Time Card. After a failed attempt to capture the card and repeating the same day once again, Sakura manages to chase the Time, and into Syaoran's thunder ward trap. Since it was Syaoran who managed to disrupt the card's power before Sakura sealed it to its original shape, the Clow Card belongs to him.
13	4	"Sakura and the Elephant's Test of Strength" / "Power's Ploy"; Transliteration: "Sakura to Zō no Chikara Kurabe" (Japanese: さくらとゾウの力くらべ)	Kazunori Mizuno	Nanase Ohkawa; Hiroshi Ishii	July 7, 1998	July 29, 2000	September 10, 2000
Sakura's class is visiting the zoo for a field trip and her group is assigned to observe the elephants. Near noon, something begins to break open the cages causing chaos amongst the visitors and Kero is positive it is a Clow Card. The Power Card, although invisible, begins to torment the elephants, and Sakura steps in to save them by challenging it to a game of tug-of-war. Sakura is no match for the Power Card even with the help of the elephants. Just as Sakura is about to lose, Syaoran uses the Time Card to stop time to help her win the battle, thus tricking Power into surrendering.
14	—	"Sakura, Toya, and Cinderella" / "Play Misty for Tori"; Transliteration: "Sakura to Tōya to Cinderella" (Japanese: さくらと桃矢とシンデレラ)	Shōji Yabushita	Nanase Ohkawa	July 14, 1998	—	September 22, 2001
Sakura is invited to the high school culture festival. She meets Tomoyo and Syaoran there and watches a play by Yukito and Toya's class. During the play, a corrosive mist forms outside the auditorium and enters through the vents where it destroys the stage and puts Toya and a girl named Yoko in danger. Sakura and Syaoran head towards the lighting room where Sakura summons the Shadow Card to capture the Mist Card while Syaoran uses wind magic to save Toya and Yoko.
15	—	"Sakura and Kero's Big Fight" / "Sakura and Kero's Big Fight"; Transliteration: "Sakura to Kero no Ōgenka" (Japanese: さくらとケロの大げんか)	Masaru Kitao	Jirō Kaneko	July 21, 1998	—	— (Note: The dubbed versions of episodes 15 and 16 were never broadcast in North America (although they did air in other English-speaking territories). In Canada, these episodes were originally replaced with US episodes 24 and 25 (first aired September 15 and 16, 2001 respectively) for a full 70-episode set, although in later reruns these too were omitted, with only 68 episodes broadcast instead. No other episodes specific to the US run aired in Canada.)
Syaoran captures his second Clow Card after defeating the Storm Card. Tension develops between Kero and Sakura over the issue, which builds into a fight the next day after Kero makes a mess after building a room inside Sakura's desk drawer. While Sakura is at school, Kero eats liquor-filled chocolate and wanders out the window drunk. The next day, he finds himself with a young girl named Akane who lives alone with her mother. Unable to escape, Kero secretly contacts the worried Sakura by fax. Akane wishes she could fly to see her father in heaven and the Float Card carries her up into the sky. Sakura comes to her rescue and brings Kero back home. As a way of making amends, Sakura redesigns her bottom desk drawer to become Kero's bedroom from now on.
16	—	"Sakura and the Rainbow of Memories" / "The Summer House"; Transliteration: "Sakura to Omoide no Niji" (Japanese: さくらと思い出の虹)	Mamoru Kanbe	Nanase Ohkawa	August 4, 1998	—	—
Sakura's family and Yukito take a vacation to the countryside. Sakura meets the old owner of a country mansion near their rented cottage. He invites her over for tea and tennis, making them become good friends. He shows her the room of his granddaughter, now deceased, and gives Sakura clothes that once belonged to her. The next day, Fujitaka gives Sakura cookies to give to the old man. On the last day of her vacation, Sakura asks the old man to stand on the balcony of his granddaughter's room. From a distance, Sakura uses the Rain Card to give the old man a rainbow as a goodbye gift. Sonomi comes out of hiding to speak with the old man, and reveals the old man is Masaki Amamiya, the grandfather of both Sonomi and Nadeshiko, and Sakura's great-grandfather.
17	3	"Sakura's Scary Test of Courage" / "The Cave"; Transliteration: "Sakura no Kowai Kimodameshi" (Japanese: さくらのこわーいきもだめし)	Ken Andō	Nanase Ohkawa	August 11, 1998	July 8, 2000	September 17, 2000
Sakura and her class are on a trip to the beach for a few days. On the first night, Naoko tells one of her scary stories, causing Sakura to flee to the teacher's lodging, but she is found by Syaoran who senses something in a cave nearby. Together at the beach, the two have their first civil conversation where Syaoran tells Sakura about Wei Wang, his legal guardian. In a test of courage, the students are sent into the cave to place a candle at the shrine. However, all of them except Sakura and Syaoran disappear. Syaoran realizes the Erase Card is responsible, encouraging Sakura to catch it before he too vanishes. She succeeds, restoring everyone. When she offers the card to Syaoran, he rejects it.
18	—	"Sakura, Yukito, and the Summer Festival" / "A Fair to Remember"; Transliteration: "Sakura to Yukito no Natsumatsuri" (Japanese: さくらと雪兎と夏祭り)	Shōji Yabushita	Nanase Ohkawa	August 18, 1998	—	September 29, 2001
Sakura visits a summer festival with Tomoyo, Yukito, and Toya. After meeting Chiharu and Takashi, Sakura and Yukito wander away from the group, where they find glowing lights falling from tree-like snow at the back of the shrine—just like a dream Sakura envisioned the night before. Just as Sakura is about to tell Yukito something, she is interrupted by their friends. When everyone leaves for snow cones, Sakura captures the Glow Card.
19	—	"Sakura and the Summer Holiday Homework" / "Nothing to Report"; Transliteration: "Sakura to Natsuyasumi no Shukudai" (Japanese: さくらと夏休みの宿題)	Mamoru Kanbe	Jirō Kaneko	September 1, 1998	—	April 22, 2001
The summer holidays are coming to an end and Sakura still has a lot of homework to do. Making a deal with her brother and Kero to help her, Sakura is left with only a book report to do and meets with Tomoyo at the library. There, they meet Syaoran who refuses to share a library cubicle. Sakura needs a specific book to do her report on, as does Syaoran. When the Move Card steals it and teleports the book around, Sakura and Syaoran give chase. They successfully capture it but fall into the river. Syaoran takes Sakura and Tomoyo home to dry off, only for a Chinese girl, his cousin Meiling Li, to unexpectedly arrive.
20	6	"Transfer Student vs. Sakura" / "The New Rival"; Transliteration: "Sakura to Tatakau Tenkōsei" (Japanese: さくらとたたかう転校生)	Junichi Sakata	Nanase Ohkawa	September 8, 1998	August 5, 2000	September 24, 2000
The day after the last episode, Sakura properly meets Meiling, who openly reveals she and Syaoran are engaged. Meiling, aggressive and bratty, takes a disliking to Sakura, believing she is Syaoran's rival. At home, Sakura learns a mysterious woman is challenging people to fights. Worried this woman could target Toya, Sakura searches for her. Meiling appears, sporting her own battle costume, and identifying the assailant as a Clow Card. That card, the Fight Card, appears and battles Sakura, Meiling, and Syaoran when he arrives. Sakura takes on the strength of the Power Card, knocking the Fight out, and captures her. Meiling is displeased, vowing to help Syaoran catch the cards.
21	—	"Sakura's Long Marathon Race" / "The Long Marathon"; Transliteration: "Sakura no Nagai Marason Taikai" (Japanese: さくらのながーいマラソン大会)	Mamoru Kanbe	Jirō Kaneko	September 15, 1998	—	September 30, 2001
During a school race, Meiling is determined to win with Syaoran, in their usual "One-Two Finish" they were known for in their previous school. During the race, both Syaoran and Sakura take off at top speed after seeing that Yukito is watching. As they run, the Loop Card traps Sakura and Syaoran, causing them to run in circles. After they realize what has happened, Sakura is able to use the Sword Card to cut the Loop. Syaoran carries Meiling, who hurt her ankle, along the rest of the way to the finish line, joined by Sakura, who finishes last.
22	—	"Sakura and Her Kind Father" / "No Time for Sleep"; Transliteration: "Sakura to Yasashii Otōsan" (Japanese: さくらとやさしいお父さん)	Kazunori Mizuno	Hiroshi Ishii	September 22, 1998	—	April 18, 2001
Fujitaka has an important presentation to complete, so Sakura and Toya decide to help by taking on all the chores around the house. Sakura decides to do more and brings a snack for her father at the university. While she is there, the Sleep Card shows up and starts to make all the students and professors fall asleep. Sakura manages to capture the card with the help of Windy, however, her father's office and laptop are ruined. Although her father forgives her, Sakura still feels guilty, so her father decides to make her his personal assistant and they eventually get the presentation finished together.
23	—	"Sakura, Tomoyo, and the Wonderful Song" / "Practice Makes Perfect"; Transliteration: "Sakura to Tomoyo to Suteki na Uta" (Japanese: さくらと知世とすてきな歌)	Hitoyuki Matsui	Nanase Ohkawa	September 29, 1998	—	October 10, 2001
A rumor spreads at Sakura's school that a ghost haunts the music room and sings at night. At first afraid to investigate, Sakura changes her mind when Yukito comments he would like to hear the ghost sing. Joined by Tomoyo, Kero, Syaoran, and Meiling, Sakura learns the ghost is the Song Card, and the voice she is impersonating is Tomoyo's. On the roof, Tomoyo performs the song, which the Song Card joins in with, allowing Sakura to catch it. Forgetting she was supposed to record the voice for Yukito, Sakura asks Tomoyo and the Song Card to perform again.
24	—	"Sakura's Little Adventure" / "No Problem Too Small"; Transliteration: "Sakura no Chiisana Daibōken" (Japanese: さくらの小さな大冒険)	Akira Mano	Nanase Ohkawa; Jirō Kaneko	October 6, 1998	—	April 29, 2001
When Tomoyo comes over to measure Sakura for a new outfit, Sakura comes in contact with the Little Card, which shrinks her and her magic. While Tomoyo and Kero search for her, Sakura winds up in the backyard and gets chased by a cat and a praying mantis. Toya and Yukito come home, Tomoyo covering for Sakura whilst Kero searches for her. The Little Card nearly makes contact with Tomoyo, but Sakura intervenes, returns to her normal size, and seals the card.
25	7	"Sakura and One More Sakura" / "Double Take"; Transliteration: "Sakura to Mō Hitori no Sakura" (Japanese: さくらともう一人のさくら)	Mamoru Kanbe	Tomoko Ogawa	October 13, 1998	August 19, 2000	October 1, 2000
Numerous people accuse Sakura of causing trouble around town. Sakura is in denial until she spots her doppelganger. Using the Clow Cards, Sakura identifies her twin as a Clow Card. She also learns that all the cards know her identity. Realizing the card is targeting Toya, Sakura goes to find him. The card lures Toya off a cliff, but becomes guilt-stricken when she realizes Toya was simply trying to be kind. With help from Syaoran, Sakura locates her brother and the card. Needing to identify the card by name, Sakura uses the cards, naming the card as the Mirror. Before being captured, the Mirror sheds tears and apologizes.
26	8	"Sakura and the Wonderful Teacher" / "No Way Out"; Transliteration: "Sakura to Suteki na Sensei" (Japanese: さくらとすてきな先生)	Kazunori Mizuno	Tomoyasu Ōkubo	October 20, 1998	September 16, 2000	October 8, 2000
On her way home from school, Sakura meets a mysterious woman. At school, this woman, Kaho Mizuki, is introduced as the class' substitute math teacher. Syaoran becomes suspicious of Ms. Mizuki, who he senses has strong magical powers. While at the local shrine, Sakura and her friends are trapped within the walls of the Maze Card. They are unable to escape, and Meiling is separated from the others. However, they are rescued by Ms. Mizuki using a magical bell. Sakura seals the Maze Card, but it subsequently lands in Mizuki's hands. Toya arrives to find Sakura but is disturbed when he recognizes Ms. Mizuki.
27	—	"Sakura and the Shrine of Memories" / "Return to the Future"; Transliteration: "Sakura to Omoide no Jinja" (Japanese: さくらと思い出の神社)	Hitoyuki Matsui	Nanase Ohkawa	October 27, 1998	—	October 11, 2001
Sakura learns that Toya knew Ms. Mizuki whilst in junior high. She later meets Ms. Mizuki at the shrine, learning she lives there. Sakura, Kero, and Syaoran later visit the shrine upon sensing a Clow Card, but nothing appears. Sakura gives her wallet to Kero to buy them drinks. Meanwhile, Sakura and Syaoran talk. Syaoran asks her if she does not feel anything when she is with Ms. Mizuki. She says that she feels "dazed", but admits that she makes her feel different from other people. Shaoran tells her that "those with power are likely to be drawn to others with power." Equally, they both come to terms that they both like Yukito, although Syaoran blushes a little after listening to Sakura's acknowledgement. Sakura is suddenly sucked into the shrine's tree by the Return Card. Sakura finds herself experiencing events from the past between Toya and Ms. Mizuki, who were once lovers before the latter left for England. Sakura returns to the present, catching the Return. Syaoran uses the Time card, spending a tremendous amount of magic power to help Sakura back. After she finds out, Sakura hugs Syaoran which makes him blush and faint. Ms. Mizuki stares at both from afar.
28	14	"Sakura and the Enchanted Cards" / "Buyer Beware"; Transliteration: "Sakura to Omajinai Kādo" (Japanese: さくらとおまじないカード)	Mamoru Kanbe	Tomoko Ogawa	November 3, 1998	November 4, 2000	January 3, 2001
A new craze sweeps Twin Bells, specifically collectible luck cards that resemble the Clow Cards. Sakura tries to get one to help her cooking skills, as she is afraid of hot oil spills from deep-frying. Meiling nonchalantly tries to buy a romance card to woo Syaoran but ends up buying the dangerous Shot Card instead. After looking among her friends, Sakura finds out that Meiling has the real Clow card. Sakura meets Syaoran and tells him. She invites him to hop on her flying wand. He hesitates a little but immediately joins her, worried about Meiling. Both confront her, but in love and jealousy of them, she denies giving it back. The Shot begins attacking Syaoran. Sakura uses the Mirror Card to deflect Shot's attack, injuring it which allows it to be captured. After going home, Sakura learns with her dad how to successfully fry croquettes, which she wanted to give to Yukito. On the following day, Meiling gives Sakura the Cook collectible luck card, in return for what happened the day before.
29	—	"Sakura's Sweet Cooking" / "How Sweet It Is"; Transliteration: "Sakura no Amāi Kukkingu" (Japanese: さくらのあまーいクッキング)	Akira Mano	Tomoko Ogawa	November 10, 1998	—	March 4, 2002
Sakura practices in the kitchen with her father for an upcoming home-economics class. Sakura and her classmates will bake cakes and start discussing the flavors in advance. Sakura and Syaoran both decide to bake cakes for Yukito. The following day, everyone begins making their various cakes, but after leaving them to bake over lunch, they come back to find them to be far too sweet. The next day, everyone starts over and makes sure they measure the ingredients correctly. Sakura and Syaoran sense a Clow Card, staying behind over lunch to find it. They discover it to be the Sweet Card, which flies around the room turning everything into sweets and confectionary. Sakura captures the card after throwing salt on it to temporarily immobilize it, which causes the room to revert to normal. After everyone comes back, and the cakes have been cooked well, save Meiling's rushed cooking. Sakura and Tomoyo give their cake to Yukito and Touya. Shaoran watches the scene from afar which helps him make up his mind.
30	9	"Sakura and the Injured Card" / "The Race"; Transliteration: "Sakura to Kega wo Shita Kādo" (Japanese: さくらとケガをしたカード)	Mamoru Kanbe	Jirō Kaneko	November 17, 1998	August 26, 2000	October 15, 2000
Sakura's attempt to capture the speedy Dash Card fails. The injured, fox-like spirit ends up in the care of Sakura's upperclassman, Rei, who is on the track team. The Dash increases Rei's agility as a way of thanks. Sakura becomes reluctant to capture it, due to Rei's relationship with it. However, when Syaoran locates it, Sakura is forced to catch it, Kero reasoning that if she had not, Rei would have technically been cheating. At a competition, Rei sees the Dash Card, inspiring her to run hard and win the race. Sakura thanks Syaoran for his help, but he denies his involvement.
31	10	"Sakura and the Nameless Book" / "Dragon Slayer"; Transliteration: "Sakura to Namae no nai Hon" (Japanese: さくらと名前のない本)	Kazunori Mizuno	Nanase Ohkawa	November 24, 1998	September 15, 2000	November 1, 2000
Naoko, Sakura's classmate, goes to a bookstore with a friend, where she buys a mysterious book that has no title. Sakura catches the Big Card, only for her and her friends to encounter strange phenomena. Kero suggests the Create Card, Naoko's book, is responsible. Everything Naoko writes materializes in the real world, culminating in a dragon appearing. Sakura uses the Big Cards to become a giant, wrestling the dragon. It begins to vanish, Naoko having stopped writing, but Kero tells her to capture the dragon, as it will seal the Create Card too.
32	11	"Sakura, Kero, and Syaoran" / "The Switch"; Transliteration: "Sakura to Kero to Syaoran to" (Japanese: さくらとケロと小狼と)	Hitoyuki Matsui	Nanase Ohkawa	December 1, 1998	September 23, 2000	November 5, 2000
During the capture of the Change Card, Syaoran, and Kero pin it down so Sakura can catch it. However, the two discover they have swapped bodies thanks to the Change Card. The process will reverse after twenty-four hours, but only if Syaoran and Kero are touching each other in the place the spell was cast. Both blunder their way through the day, pretending to be each other, and it is not too long before both Tomoyo and Meiling find out. Syaoran also has to be rescued from a claw machine. However, Sakura successfully restores them to their normal bodies.
33	12	"Sakura's Freezing Ice Skating" / "Ice Breaker"; Transliteration: "Sakura no Samui Aisusukēto" (Japanese: さくらのさむーいアイススケート)	Mamoru Kanbe	Tomoko Ogawa	December 15, 1998	September 30, 2000	November 12, 2000
Sakura's class takes a trip to the town's ice skating rink. At the rink, the temperature dramatically drops. The Freeze Card begins to freeze everyone by covering them with ice, except those with magical powers, which include Sakura, Syaoran, and the unseen Ms. Mizuki. With the help of Syaoran's distractions, Sakura is able to capture the Freeze Card, and ultimately, Syaoran becomes the master of the Freeze Card due to his idea of getting Freeze to appear out of the ice rink. Syaoran begins to show signs of romantic feelings towards Sakura.
34	—	"Sakura, Yukito, and the Midday Moon" / "By the Light of the Full Moon"; Transliteration: "Sakura to Yukito to Hiru no Tsuki" (Japanese: さくらと雪兎と昼の月)	Akira Mano	Nanase Ohkawa	December 22, 1998	—	March 5, 2002
Sakura and Yukito participate as a two-man team in the quiz tournament. As they get to the tenth question which is the last, Ms. Mizuki warns them about the full moon tonight. They go into the forest and then suddenly Sakura becomes dazed and begins to fall off the cliff. Yukito dashes to Sakura and covers her, but his leg is injured. The two manage to survive and return to their friends safe and sound.
35	13	"Sakura's Wonderful Christmas" / "The Third Element"; Transliteration: "Sakura no Suteki na Kurisumasu" (Japanese: さくらのすてきなクリスマス)	Kazunori Mizuno	Nanase Ohkawa	December 29, 1998	October 14, 2000	November 19, 2000
With Christmas approaching, Sakura is unsure what to give Yukito for his birthday, which is on the same day. She asks Meiling for advice, who tells her the person will like whatever they get her if they truly care. She invites Yukito on a date at an amusement park, hoping to give him her gift. They meet Syaoran and Meiling there too. The Firey Card appears, Sakura and Syaoran capturing it together. A portion of Kero's power returns to him thanks to the capture. On the Ferris wheel, Sakura gives Yukito a present, a handmade doll of him.

=== Season 2 (1999) ===
Org #	US #	Original title translated to English / Cardcaptors title	Directed by	Written by	Original airdate	US airdate	Canadian airdate
36	15	"Sakura and the Snowy New School Term" / "Stormy Weather"; Transliteration: "Sakura to Yuki no Shingakki" (Japanese: さくらと雪の新学期)	Akira Mano	Nanase Ohkawa	April 6, 1999	November 11, 2000	January 7, 2001
Sakura is now a fifth grader. Yukito gives her a watch as a present. Despite it being April, it begins to snow outside, which quickly turns into a blizzard. Sensing a Clow Card, Sakura, Kero, and Syaoran brave the storm to catch it, during which Sakura loses her watch. Enraged, Sakura unleashes the full power of the Firey Card to melt the snow, capturing the Snow Card shortly after. Sakura and Syaoran encounter Ms. Mizuki, who returns Sakura's watch to her.
37	—	"Sakura and Tomoyo's Lost Voice" / "The Show Must Go On"; Transliteration: "Sakura to Kieta Tomoyo no Koe" (Japanese: さくらと消えた知世の声)	Mamoru Kanbe	Nanase Ohkawa	April 13, 1999	—	March 8, 2002
Tomoyo prepares to sing as the lead vocalist of the school choir. However, the Voice Card steals her voice, rendering Tomoyo mute, much to the horror of Sakura and Sonomi. Wishing to hear Tomoyo speak again, Sakura and Syaoran go to her house to think of a plan to lure the Voice. Syaoran suggests using the Song Card to replicate Tomoyo's voice. It succeeds, the Voice is captured, returning Tomoyo's vocals, allowing her to sing in the choir.
38	—	"Sakura's Fun Strawberry Picking Adventure" / "A Berry Strange Day"; Transliteration: "Sakura no Tanoshii Ichigo Kari" (Japanese: さくらの楽しいいちご狩り)	Hitoyuki Matsui	Tomoyasu Ōkubo	April 20, 1999	—	May 6, 2001
Sakura's class goes to a strawberry farm, learning Toya and Yukito are working there voluntarily. Syaoran senses something within the study room, but Meiling drags him away before he can investigate. Later, Sakura learns no one can enter the building. She, Tomoyo, Syaoran, and Meiling become locked in the room and can't escape. Sakura spots Ms. Mizuki sitting in a tree, hinting at her to get out using the Clow Key. This unlocks the door, allowing Sakura to capture the Lock Card.
39	22	"Sakura's Dizzy Fever Day" / "Under the Weather"; Transliteration: "Sakura no Furafura Netsu Yōbi" (Japanese: さくらのふらふら熱曜日)	Yasumi Mikamoto	Nanase Ohkawa	April 27, 1999	June 30, 2001	June 3, 2001
Sakura develops a fever, but goes to school anyway, concerning her friends. She nearly collapses but is carried home by Toya. Later, Sakura senses the Cloud Card nearby, which she thought the card was Rain, using the Mirror Card to take her place while she goes to catch the card. Toya finds out but allows the Mirror to stay. Sakura is berated by Syaoran and Meiling, but they help her to catch the Cloud Card. Sakura returns home in a worse condition, but Nadeshiko's ghost appears and cures her.
40	—	"Sakura and the Sakura from the Dream" / "Dream a Little Dream"; Transliteration: "Sakura to Yume no Naka no Sakura" (Japanese: さくらと夢の中のさくら)	Shigehito Takayanagi	Nanase Ohkawa	May 11, 1999	—	March 14, 2002
Sakura, Tomoyo, Meiling, and Syaoran head to Tokyo for a day of fun. The four are not alone in their venture as the Dream Card, in the form of a butterfly, tags along. When the group enters Tokyo Tower to see an exhibit there, Sakura falls under the Dream's spell. At first, the vision that the Dream presents to Sakura is comical. Later, the Dream takes a more serious tone by expanding upon Sakura's reoccurring dreams concerning the Final Judgment, an event that shall occur when all the Clow Cards are gathered. Sakura becomes frightened of the images of this future, however, the Dream flashes clips from Sakura's past to remind Sakura of all the obstacles that she has overcome. Outside of Sakura's dream, Syaoran realizes that something is wrong and uses the Time Card to freeze the Dream. Snapped out of the Dream's spell, Sakura is able to successfully capture it. However, as it was Syaoran that stopped the card's effects, the Dream belongs to him.
41	21	"Sakura, Syaoran, and the Sea of Sand" / "The Sands of Time"; Transliteration: "Sakura to Syaoran to Suna no Umi" (Japanese: さくらと小狼と砂の海)	Mamoru Kanbe	Nanase Ohkawa	May 18, 1999	June 23, 2001	May 13, 2001
Ms. Mizuki announces that the class will be doing a play of Sleeping Beauty for the school arts festival. Sakura realizes that the woman she sees in her reoccurring dream is Ms. Mizuki. Roles are assigned by Amida drawing. Sakura has the role of the prince and Syaoran is the princess. They agree to practice their lines together in the morning at school. They practice outside and almost get to the kissing scene when the Sand Card forms a vortex around them. They get away using Fly, but Syaoran gets caught in the vortex again. Sakura uses Watery and Syaoran uses Freeze to defeat the Sand. Sakura seals the card and it comes to both of them, but she lets Syaoran have it.
42	—	"Sakura and the Blacked Out School Arts Festival" / "A Strange Intermission"; Transliteration: "Sakura no Makkura Gakugei-kai" (Japanese: さくらのまっくら学芸会)	Akira Mano	Nanase Ohkawa	May 25, 1999	—	May 20, 2001
The day of the play comes, and after a few denials about going out on stage from Syaoran, the play is on. The play goes well until right before Sakura and Syaoran kiss when the Dark Card appears. Sakura is almost lost in the Dark until she realizes that she holds the Light Card in her heart. The two cards counteract each other and show themselves. Sakura seals both cards and before being sealed, they tell her that the Final judgment is coming and that it will be up to someone named Yue to decide if she will become their new master.
43	17	"Sakura and Farewell to Meiling" / "Meilin's Story"; Transliteration: "Sakura no Sayonara Meirin" (Japanese: さくらのさよなら苺鈴)	Setsuo Takase	Nanase Ohkawa	June 1, 1999	December 2, 2000	January 21, 2001
Meiling receives news that her mother wants her to return home to Hong Kong. Devastated, particularly by Syaoran's reaction, Sakura abruptly invites Meiling to a sleepover. Meiling reveals how she and Syaoran grew up together, and she forced him into their engagement, but on the condition that if he fell in love with someone else, she would end the agreement. The Twin Card appears in town, replicating things. Sakura drags Meiling out to help, who believes she is a burden to Syaoran. Together, Syaoran and Meiling defeat the Twin, Sakura catching it. Before Meiling leaves, Syaoran admits he never saw her as a burden.
44	18	"Sakura, Kero, and the Mysterious Teacher" / "The Last Card (1)"; Transliteration: "Sakura to Kero to Fushigi na Sensei" (Japanese: さくらとケロと不思議な先生)	Mamoru Kanbe	Nanase Ohkawa	June 8, 1999	July 21, 2001	January 28, 2001
Sakura once again has the dream in which she is facing the Tokyo Tower. She clearly sees Ms. Mizuki, but this time, Mizuki is accompanied by another figure with long hair and wings. She wakes up early to see Yukito compete in an archery competition. She meets up with Syaoran and Tomoyo at the archery competition, and Kero tags along too. At the archery tournament, Sakura finds that Ms. Mizuki is one of the challengers and ends up in the finals alongside Yukito. During the fierce match, Kero pokes his head out of Sakura's bag upon sensing tremendous magical power, shooting a piercing glare at Ms. Mizuki. Sensing his gaze, Ms. Mizuki loses her focus and the tournament. Later during lunch, Sakura discovers that Kero is missing from her bag. Searching for him, she is astonished to find him in the middle of a private conversation with Ms. Mizuki. While walking home, they run into Toya once again, this time dressed in a bear costume and giving out balloons. After he leaves, there is an earthquake, likely caused by the final Clow Card: The Earthy.
45	19	"Sakura and the Final Clow Card" / "The Last Card (2)"; Transliteration: "Sakura to Saigo no Kurou Kaado" (Japanese: さくらと最後のクロウカード)	Yorifusa Yamaguchi	Nanase Ohkawa	June 15, 1999	July 28, 2001	February 4, 2001
Sakura and Kero combat the destructive Earthy Card, putting the Tokyo citizens to sleep, including Yukito. Using the Wood Card, Sakura is able to restrain Earthy, letting her catch it. With the final Clow Card complete, Kero transforms into his true form of Cerberus, a winged lion. However, the Final Judgement is at hand. Kero assumed Ms. Mizuki was the human form of Yue, the secondary guardian of the cards. However, come midnight, Yukito suddenly transforms into Yue, much to Sakura and Syaoran's shock. The colder, merciless Yue notes there are two Cardcaptors, and quickly defeats Syaoran, taking his cards.
46	20	"Sakura and the Final Judgment" / "The Final Judgement"; Transliteration: "Sakura to Saigo no Shinpan" (Japanese: さくらと最後の審判)	Shigehito Takayanagi	Nanase Ohkawa	June 22, 1999	July 28, 2001	February 11, 2001
Sakura initially refuses to fight Yue, but she tries to find the card that can confine him without hurting him. She uses the Wood Card, but as its power falls under Yue's sign of the moon, he turns it against her and declares she has failed. Sakura learns that if she fails the Final Judgment, everyone who has ever had anything to do with the cards will forget their feelings for the person they love the most. After seeing a vision of such a world where Kero and Yukito don't exist, Ms. Mizuki uses the bell to enable Sakura to break free from Wood's hold. She explains that her bell was created by Clow Reed to give Sakura another chance. Ready to try again, Sakura releases her wand and it transforms, the end changing to a star-shaped point. She calls Windy, which Yue denounces as being under him as well, but this time he is unable to turn it against her and is captured. Sakura expresses her understanding of his love for Clow and asks to be friends. Yue declares the trial successful and acknowledges her as his and Kero's new master. Sakura has a vision of Clow Reed who thanks her and explains that her power is of the stars, rather than the Sun or Moon. Sakura celebrates with Tomoyo and Syaoran, while Kero and Yue chat briefly before they return to their false forms.

=== Season 3 (1999–2000) ===
Org #	US #	Original title translated to English / Cardcaptors title	Directed by	Written by	Original airdate	US airdate	Canadian airdate
47	24 (Note: Scenes from episodes 47, 48 and 58 of Cardcaptor Sakura are combined into US episode 24 of Cardcaptors, "The Past, The Present and The Future".)	"Sakura and the Mysterious Transfer Student" / "The New Transfer Student"; Transliteration: "Sakura to Fushigi na Tenkōsei" (Japanese: さくらと不思議な転校生)	Shigehito Takayanagi	Nanase Ohkawa	September 7, 1999	August 4, 2001	March 15, 2002
Several months have passed since Sakura became the new master of the Clow Cards, and things are largely peaceful. At school, Sakura sees the arrival of a new transfer student, Eriol Hiiragizawa, prompting Syaoran to cancel his plans to return to Hong Kong. Toya's school also has a new student, Nakuru Akizuki. After school, it mysteriously begins to rain over Tomoeda, though nowhere else. While investigating the bizarre weather, Sakura finds she is unable to transform her new Star Key into the Star Wand and is in turn unable to use the Clow Cards. The situation gets so bad that Sakura, Tomoyo and Kero are forced to retreat after Sakura is unable to stop the downpour.
48	25 (Note: Episodes 47 and 48 of Cardcaptor Sakura are combined into US episode 25 of Cardcaptors, "A Strange New Beginning".)	"Sakura and the Awakened Star Key" / "Unlocking the Key"; Transliteration: "Sakura to Mezameta Hoshi no Kagi" (Japanese: さくらとめざめた星の鍵)	Mamoru Kanbe	Nanase Ohkawa	September 14, 1999	August 4, 2001	February 8, 2003
As the mysterious downpour continues over Tomoeda, Syaoran becomes jealous when Eriol befriends Sakura, while Nakuru begins interrupting Toya every time he tries to tell Yukito something important. Kero consults with Yue about the unnatural weather, explaining that he has felt a familiar presence. While attempting to investigate again with Kero, Yue, and Tomoyo, Sakura is once again unable to summon the Star Wand or use the Clow Cards, and the four are imprisoned in torrents of water. Sakura creates a new incantation based on her power of the stars, not only allowing her to use her wand but also able to change the Firey Card, amplifying its power to such a degree that the downpour is stopped for good. Sakura frees herself and her friends, though the entire experience causes her to collapse from using too much magic.
49	—	"Sakura and the Dangerous Piano" / "The Dangerous Piano"; Transliteration: "Sakura to Kiken na Piano" (Japanese: さくらとキケンなピアノ)	Osamu Mikasa	Nanase Ohkawa	September 21, 1999	—	March 28, 2002
Exhausted from the events of the other night, Sakura remains in bed and sleeps into the afternoon before being visited by Syaoran and Tomoyo. Kero explains that Sakura used a great deal of power to transform the Clow Card, explaining her sudden tiredness. Since the Firey Card was transformed to be under the jurisdiction of Sakura's power, Sakura's friends henceforth transform the cards into "Sakura Cards". Later at school, Sakura overhears Eriol playing the piano and has Tomoyo sing to his music; unbeknownst to them, however, Eriol enchants the piano while he plays. While waiting for Tomoyo to finish practicing her song, Sakura and Syaoran find her being attacked by the piano, which has been brought to life; in addition, Sakura senses Clow Reed's presence on the piano. Discovering that the piano is being lured to Tomoyo's voice, Sakura lures the piano to the roof of the school, transforms the Song card, and uses it to mimic Tomoyo's singing, tricking the piano into falling off the roof and smashing on the ground.
50	27 (Note: Episodes 50 and 51 of Cardcaptor Sakura are combined into US episode 27 of Cardcaptors, "A New Set of Wings".)	"Sakura, Syaoran, and the Invisible Threads" / "The Threads That Bind"; Transliteration: "Sakura to Syaoran to Mienai Ito" (Japanese: さくらと小狼とみえない糸)	Norihiko Nagahama	Nanase Ohkawa	September 28, 1999	August 25, 2001	February 8, 2003
Sakura begins to wonder if the bizarre goings are connected to Clow Reed's presence, though she is aware that Clow is long deceased. At recess, Rika shows everyone a teddy bear she made. Sakura decides to get her own teddy-bear-making kit at the craft store where she sees Eriol buying several spools of string. That night, Sakura and Kero once again sense Clow Reed's presence and meet up with Syaoran and Tomoyo. However, Syaoran's body begins moving against his will and attacks Sakura. Fortunately, he is able to cast a water spell around himself, revealing a set of invisible strings controlling his movements, which Sakura cuts with the transformed Sword card although yet again, she is left exhausted by the effort. Meanwhile, it is revealed that Eriol was the one manipulating Syaoran and that he is the reincarnation of Clow Reed. He has two servants: Spinel Sun, a beast similar to Kerberos, and Ruby Moon, the true form of Nakuru.
51	27	"Sakura and the Big Teddy Bear" / "Attack of the Teddy Bear"; Transliteration: "Sakura to Ōki na Nuigurumi" (Japanese: さくらと大きなぬいぐるみ)	Kazunori Mizuno	Nanase Ohkawa	October 5, 1999	August 25, 2001	October 5, 2001
Several people at school have started making their own teddy bears to give to their loved ones, while Eriol helps Sakura make her bear for Yukito, secretly enchanting one of its ears. Syaoran, who also has feelings for Yukito and has made his own bear, begins falling in love with Sakura as well. Yue approaches the confused Syaoran and tells him that the reason he seems to be in love with Yukito is that he, having descended from Clow Reed, feels an attraction to the moon powers Yue emits as a creation of Clow. That night, Sakura gives Yukito the bear, only to see it grow in size in response to Eriol's magic. Yue awakens to protect Sakura from the bear but quickly loses his power. Sensing the bear's power source in its ear, Sakura transforms the Jump and Fly cards, the latter granting her a new winged form that allows her to use Sword as well (since both cards previously involved Sakura's wand transforming and could not be used simultaneously as Clow Cards), cutting off the bear's ear and returning it to normal.
52	28	"Sakura's Sheep Warning" / "Trouble at the Park"; Transliteration: "Sakura no Hitsuji Chūihō?!" (Japanese: さくらのひつじ注意報?!)	Shinichi Masaki	Nanase Ohkawa	October 12, 1999	September 1, 2001	October 7, 2001
Yue secretly confides with Kerberos that he has recently been losing his energy and that Sakura's powers alone are not enough to help him maintain himself; he adds that if his power disappears, both he and his alter ego Yukito, who is oblivious to this incident but growing increasingly aware of it, will fade from existence. Toya, who is aware of Yukito's predicament, attempts to tell him the truth but is once again interrupted by Nakuru, making it clear she is doing so on purpose. Meanwhile, Sakura's attention is drawn to a large, deep hole in the middle of the playground. She is able to enter the hole, though her friends are not since it is sealed by Clow Reed's magic. At the bottom of the hole, Sakura is buried under a pile of stuffed sheep. However, she converts the Erase card to obliterate the sheep.
53	26	"Sakura and the Panicky Bike" / "Running Out of Time"; Transliteration: "Sakura to Panikku Jitensha" (Japanese: さくらとパニック自転車)	Setsuo Takase	Nanase Ohkawa	October 19, 1999	August 11, 2001	September 23, 2001
Sakura learns that the Clow Cards she is unable to use are beginning to lose their power, and will become ordinary cards if they are not converted into Sakura Cards. Unwilling to let this happen, Sakura brings her Star Wand and despite Kero's misgivings, recklessly converts several cards at once although she's left weakened. However, she loses control of one of the cards, the Dash, which panics and flees, possessing Toya's bike which Eriol had enchanted earlier while helping Sakura clean her yard. During a frantic chase through the park, Kero scolds Sakura for her increasingly rash decisions and behavior, which prove troublesome to her attempts to corner the bike. Sakura jumps off to catch the bicycle but she can't reach it. Fortunately, Syaoran is there to catch her before she can fall to her death. Sakura eventually calms Dash down by using both Loop and Windy. After struggling, it returns to its card, much to Sakura's relief. As such, Sakura resolves to turn all the Clow Cards into Sakura Cards, but only when the situation calls for it.
54	—	"Sakura and the Calendar of Memories" / "Calendar of Memories"; Transliteration: "Sakura to Omoide no Karendā" (Japanese: さくらと思い出のカレンダー)	Shōji Saeki	Nanase Ohkawa	October 26, 1999	—	February 15, 2003
Fujitaka gives Sakura her mother's old calendar and learns about her great-grandfather (the two had previously met, though Sakura remains unaware of his identity) and how he disapproved of his granddaughter's marriage to Fujitaka. Hoping to set things right, Sakura hand-makes a gift and uses the Flower card to decorate it, along with a letter about how happy her mother was. Tomoyo's mother Sonomi delivers the present to him, and he makes peace with Fujitaka. As a thank-you present, Sakura receives her mother's old dress from her great-grandfather, which she wore when she unknowingly met him.
55	34	"Sakura and Sakura From Wonderland" / "Sakura in Wonderland"; Transliteration: "Sakura to Fushigi no Kuni no Sakura" (Japanese: さくらと不思議の国のさくら)	Norihiko Nagahama	Nanase Ohkawa	November 2, 1999	December 3, 2001	March 6, 2002
While reading Alice in Wonderland, Sakura is sucked into the book's fantasy due to another of Eriol's enchantments, this time on a leaf he gave Sakura to use as a bookmark. There she meets the story's characters who have taken on the forms of her friends and family: Eriol is the Cheshire Cat, Yukito is the White Rabbit, Toya is the Mad Hatter, Syaoran is Tweedle-Dum and Tweedle-Dee, Tomoyo is Humpty Dumpty, and Kero is the Red Queen. During the adventure, Sakura converts the Big and Little cards (in fruitless attempts to use them to her advantage) and discovers that Syaoran likes someone else other than Yukito. In the end, she manages to find the enchanted leaf floating in the sky and flies through it, allowing her to escape the book.
56	30	"Sakura, Kero, and the Sweet Meeting" / "Spinning Out of Control"; Transliteration: "Sakura to Kero no Okashina Deai??" (Japanese: さくらとケロのお菓子な出会い??)	Yorifusa Yamaguchi	Nanase Ohkawa	November 9, 1999	September 22, 2001	October 12, 2001
Sakura's school is hosting a bazaar, and Kero attends to eat sweets, hiding in the woods. Nakuru, meanwhile, brings Spinel Sun along and hides him in the same forest while she attends the bazaar. Kero meets Suppie (the pet name Nakuru gave him) but is completely oblivious to his true nature and befriends him, forcing him to eat some of the sweets. As a result, Suppie becomes intoxicated by the sugar and goes on an eating binge throughout the school. Kero, who is unable to explain the predicament to Sakura, asks her to use the Sleep card on all the customers, allowing him to get rid of Suppie.
57	32	"Sakura, Syaoran, and the Elevator" / "Li's Calling"; Transliteration: "Sakura to Syaoran to Erebētā" (Japanese: さくらと小狼とエレベーター)	Shigehito Takayanagi	Nanase Ohkawa	November 16, 1999	October 8, 2001	October 8, 2001
Syaoran's feelings for Sakura have been steadily increasing, though he still does not understand why, and Sakura remains blissfully unaware of it. Soon Sakura invites him to go to a teddy bear festival with her, Tomoyo, and Eriol. However, Eriol secretly traps Sakura and Syaoran in an elevator, where the two grow closer. Eriol then creates a large hole in the wall of the elevator, causing Sakura to fall through. Distraught, Syaoran calls out to Sakura by her first name for the first time. Fortunately, Sakura is able to float to safety with the Float card into the relieved Syaoran's arms. Later, Sakura feels that she and Syaoran have become very close friends, and asks him if she can call him "Syaoran" as well (having referred to him by his surname "Li" up until now). After agreeing, he finally accepts that he has fallen in love with Sakura.
58	29	"Sakura and Double Trouble" / "Double Trouble"; Transliteration: "Sakura to Futari no Dai Pinchi" (Japanese: さくらと二人の大ピンチ)	Naoto Hashimoto	Nanase Ohkawa	November 30, 1999	September 15, 2001	October 9, 2001
Eriol casts a spell on Kerberos and Yue so that they are unable to revert to their guise forms, much to Sakura's dismay, since it is understandably difficult to hide their true forms for long. Fortunately, Toya and Fujitaka are out for the day, and Sakura has them help around the house while reminiscing about their time with Clow Reed. Eventually, Sakura gets the idea of using the Shield card, which can nullify and protect people from magic, and the two guardians are able to revert to their original forms. Eriol becomes impressed by Sakura's increasing skill, while Kero begins to wonder who besides Clow Reed would have the power to prevent them from transforming.
59	31	"Sakura, Tomoyo, and the Ball Trap" / "Trapped"; Transliteration: "Sakura to Tomoyo to Bōru no Wana" (Japanese: さくらと知世とボールの罠)	Hiroyuki Tanaka	Nanase Ohkawa	December 7, 1999	September 22, 2001	October 13, 2001
Sakura grows in magical strength and power for every Clow Card she transforms into a Sakura Card, while Yue's energy begins to falter. Yue also comes to the realization that Eriol is in fact Clow Reed and transforms in front of him. However, Eriol makes Yukito faint and erases his memory of him ever realizing who Eriol truly is; Clow Reed, since he is not yet ready to reveal himself and also reverses Yue's transformation back into Yukito. Syaoran, in the meantime, has fully realized his strong romantic feelings for Sakura and consults with Tomoyo, who helps him deal with his jealousy towards Eriol and gives him the confidence (just barely, though) to speak his mind to the oblivious Sakura. Before he can do so, however, both he and Sakura sense Clow Reed's presence once again, this time in the form of a basketball that leads them through the school at night. Space has been warped in the building, causing every door to lead into a different room each time, which separates her from Tomoyo. She begins to lose hope of finding her, but Syaoran gives her the courage to proceed. Sakura then hears Tomoyo's singing voice and uses the transformed Shadow card to track her down. She later thanks Syaoran for all the help he has ever given her; Syaoran tries to confess his love to her but is interrupted when Kero forces Sakura to pose with him for Tomoyo's camera.
60	33	"Sakura and the Precious Friend" / "Just Like Old Times"; Transliteration: "Sakura to Taisetsu na Otomodachi" (Japanese: さくらと大切なお友達)	Kazunori Mizuno	Nanase Ohkawa	December 14, 1999	October 15, 2001	October 14, 2001
Remembering his promise to Meiling that he would be her "fiancé" until he found someone he loved more, Syaoran calls her to tell her that he is in love with Sakura, though he is taken by surprise when Meiling arrives in Tomoeda for the day. While Meiling spends the day with her old friends, the group is attacked by a set of enchanted penguin statues at the playground. Acting upon Meiling's advice, Sakura transforms the Freeze card and uses it to freeze the statues, allowing her and Syaoran to defeat the penguins. During the incident, however, Meiling realizes exactly why Syaoran called her. Seemingly accepting of the matter, Meiling breaks off their "engagement"; in reality, however, she is heartbroken and visits Tomoyo upon her suggestion to bawl over it. Feeling better, Meiling encourages Syaoran to confess his love to Sakura as soon as possible, since Sakura would never know about them otherwise, before leaving the next morning, Meiling leaves a cryptic message for Sakura indirectly stating she should pay attention to Syaoran's feelings.
61	—	"Sakura, the Cards, and the Presents" / "A Present For the Cards"; Transliteration: "Sakura to Kādo to Purezento" (Japanese: さくらとカードとプレゼント)	Akira Mano	Nanase Ohkawa	December 21, 1999	—	February 15, 2003
Kero is almost positive that Toya knows everything about Sakura's secret, though Sakura dismisses his claims, saying Toya would make fun of her if he did. Toya, meanwhile, is certain that Nakuru is deliberately interrupting him while he tries to tell Yukito the truth about why he is always feeling fatigued. The two make plans to buy a Christmas present for their father, though Sakura senses Clow Reed's presence again. Sakura uses the Mirror card to create her double and cover for her while she fights off a pair of enchanted fence bars with Syaoran, destroying them by using the Mist card to corrode and disintegrate them. However, Toya immediately recognizes the Mirror card but goes shopping with her anyway. In gratitude to the Mirror card for looking after his little sister, Toya gives her a ribbon for her long hair in her true form. When Sakura returns home, she plays a recording of a hymn she and Eriol played on the piano together earlier to thank all the Clow and Sakura cards for their help. When the Mirror card returns to her card form, however, Sakura notices that she is wearing the ribbon Toya gave her.
62	—	"Sakura and the Strange Written Fortune" / "Sakura's Strange Fortune"; Transliteration: "Sakura to Fushigi na Omikuji" (Japanese: さくらと不思議なおみくじ)	Yorifusa Yamaguchi	Nanase Ohkawa	January 4, 2000	—	February 22, 2003
Sakura goes to a New Year's festival and notices that Yukito is not around. Toya goes to check on him, discovering that he has not only collapsed from fatigue, but he's also beginning to fade from existence since Sakura's power, despite how strong it has become, is not enough to sustain Yue. Later at the festival, she receives a fortune from Eriol which he secretly made and enchanted, saying that she will begin to learn the "truth" in her "first dream of the year." That night, Sakura transforms the Dream card in her sleep and has a dream of the sky being blanketed by darkness emanating over Tsukimine Shrine, where she sees the silhouettes of Eriol, Spinel Sun, and Ruby Moon. When Sakura awakens to realize what she's done, she and Kero begin to suspect that they will meet the three silhouetted figures very soon.
63	—	"Sakura, the Pool, and the Huge Wave" / "A Wave of Danger"; Transliteration: "Sakura to Pūru to Ōkina Nami" (Japanese: さくらとプールと大きな波)	Naoto Hashimoto	Nanase Ohkawa	January 11, 2000	—	February 22, 2003
Sakura and her friends go spend the day at a new indoor water park, where Eriol causes the water to rise to dangerous levels. When Rika, who has trouble swimming, nearly drowns, Sakura uses the transformed Watery card to save her, risking being seen using her magic by everyone. However, it appears Eriol would have returned things to normal if Sakura was too late, making his motives unclear.
64	36	"Sakura and the Snowy Ski Class" / "Slippery Slope"; Transliteration: "Sakura to Fubuki no Sukii Kyōshitsu" (Japanese: さくらと吹雪のスキー教室)	Shigehito Takayanagi	Nanase Ohkawa	January 18, 2000	December 11, 2001	March 21, 2002
Sakura's class goes on a field trip to the mountains for skiing lessons. At the lodge, Syaoran admits to Sakura that the person he cares for most is not Yukito and that his attraction to him was actually his reaction to Yue's power; however, he still can't bring himself to tell Sakura that she is the one he's in love with. The next day, Sakura goes up the mountain with Eriol when a blizzard begins to form. At the top of the mountain, there is an avalanche that threatens to bury the lodge at the foot of the mountain where their classmates are. Sakura transforms the Time card in an attempt to stop the avalanche without Eriol seeing, but it uses up so much of her energy that she passes out. However, Eriol stops the avalanche himself (suggesting he caused it in the first place) and saves Sakura, voicing his reluctance to put her in harm's way so frequently.
65	35 (Note: Episodes 65 and 66 of Cardcaptor Sakura are combined into US episode 35 of Cardcaptors, "The Vanishing Act".)	"Sakura, Yukito, and the Vanishing Power" / "Lights, Camera, Vanish"; Transliteration: "Sakura to Yukito to Kieyuku Chikara" (Japanese: さくらと雪兎と消えゆく力)	Hiroyuki Tanaka	Nanase Ohkawa	February 15, 2000	December 10, 2001	March 7, 2002
Toya and Yukito are starring in an independent film directed by Nakuru for their school fair, and Nakuru gives Sakura a role. Sakura later begins to notice that Yukito is losing his power and is starting to fade away. Things come to a head when Yukito passes out and falls off a veranda while shooting the film, though he is saved by Toya and, secretly, Sakura. Toya finally manages to tell Yukito the truth about his power, telling off Nakuru when she attempts to interfere. In order to maintain Yue's power and existence, thus allowing Yukito to survive, Toya sacrifices his powers to save him, though losing the ability to sense when Sakura is in danger. As such, Toya has Yue promise to protect Sakura, as well as himself. Having overheard, Sakura realizes that Toya had indeed known about her secret all along. She confronts Kero about why he did not tell her about Yue/Yukito; Kero explains that he did so to prevent her from blaming herself since her magical strength alone wasn't enough to sustain him, and thus act irrationally because of it. Not wanting Yukito to disappear again, Sakura resolves to confess her true feelings to him.
66	35	"The Person Sakura Likes the Most" / "When Stars Fall"; Transliteration: "Sakura no Ichiban Suki na Hito" (Japanese: さくらの一番好きな人)	Kenichi Yatani	Nanase Ohkawa	February 22, 2000	December 10, 2001	March 1, 2003
After viewing Nakuru's film, Sakura tours the high school fair with her friends, while Toya comforts Yukito when he appears troubled by the fact that he is not human. Alone with Yukito in one of the attractions, Sakura tells Yukito how much she likes him. However, Yukito gently rebuffs her, saying that her love for him is merely fatherly, quite similar to the deep feelings she has for her father and that he already has someone he really likes and cares for a lot. Sakura, in a rare moment of insight, realizes that person to be her older brother, Toya. Yukito tells Sakura that the person she really likes most is still out there when Sakura senses Clow Reed's presence once more. Using the Maze and Illusion cards, Sakura manages to trap the presence and discovers it to be coming from Eriol, though she loses consciousness. Eriol jumbles her memory of the discovery, acknowledging that she has indeed grown strong to find him. Sakura tells Syaoran of her experience with Yukito and, despite her understanding and acceptance of the matter, begins to cry. Knowing that now is not the time to tell her that he really loves her, Syaoran comforts her and assures her that she will find the person who she really likes and cares about the most.
67	—	"Sakura, Syaoran, and the Tsukimine Shrine" / "The Calm Before the Storm"; Transliteration: "Sakura to Syaoran to Tsukimine Jinja" (Japanese: さくらと小狼と月峰神社)	Naoto Hashimoto	Nanase Ohkawa	February 29, 2000	—	March 1, 2003
Sakura heads to school in the morning but does not see Yukito. She notices that there is a festival and asks Syaoran whether he wants to go to the festival at Tsukimine Shrine. He agrees, much to Sakura's delight. As the lessons continue, Sakura feels sleepy again. Syaoran notices this and is worried. As Tomoyo and Sakura walk home, Sakura admits that she feels much better now and thanks Syaoran and Tomoyo for their help. As Syaoran and Sakura walk to the shrine, Sakura gives Syaoran her handmade scarf, which Syaoran shyly accepts. She also invited Toya, Yukito, and Eriol, who turn up at the shrine. Sakura and the rest wait near the lake while Yukito and Toya go to get drinks. As Sakura walks near the lake, she feels Clow's presence and Eriol summons a strange-looking horse. Sakura transforms the Wood card in an attempt to immobilize the horse but fails. The horse cuts the power lines and Syaoran sends a blast of lightning, but the damage is not enough. Syaoran then sends a blast of wind to push the horse into the water, and Sakura transforms the Thunder card, successfully electrocuting the horse. As the power lines are cut, there are no lights, so Sakura then transforms the Glow card to illuminate the shrine, while Syaoran wonders whether he should confess his love to Sakura.
68	37	"Sakura, the Past, and Clow Reed" / "Sakura's Return to the Past"; Transliteration: "Sakura to Kako to Kurō Riido" (Japanese: さくらと過去とクロウ·リード)	Shigehito Takayanagi	Nanase Ohkawa	March 7, 2000	December 12, 2001	March 22, 2002
Wondering what will happen once all the Clow Cards have been transformed, Sakura uses the Return card to travel back in time to talk with Clow Reed. Sakura meets with Clow Reed and he answers her questions, but during the experience, Sakura realizes that Clow Reed's house is the same one that Eriol is now living in.
69	38	"Sakura Meets Clow Reed" / "Revelations (1)"; Transliteration: "Sakura to Arawareta Kurō Riido" (Japanese: さくらと現れたクロウ·リード)	Morio Asaka	Nanase Ohkawa	March 14, 2000	December 13, 2001	March 8, 2003
Eriol reveals his true identity to Sakura and Syaoran to be the reincarnation of Clow Reed's spirit. He sets his final challenge: turn all of the remaining Clow cards into Sakura Cards or the world will remain an eternal sleep and darkness. Sakura manages to turn six of the eight cards into Sakura Cards except for the Light and Dark ones because both cards are loyal to Clow Reed and she is not powerful enough. Kero and Yue both help out Sakura by embedding their power into her staff, however, if Sakura still fails then they will remain asleep in the staff forever. Sakura hesitantly accepts and the staff is transformed. With further magic enhancement from Syaoran, Sakura transforms them and all the cards are now hers. She lifts the darkness and breaks Eriol's spell but he disappears before given an explanation. Yue and Kero give chase whilst Sakura checks on an exhausted Syaoran. Syaoran finally confesses his true feelings to Sakura.
70	39	"Sakura and Her True Feelings" / "Revelations (2)"; Transliteration: "Sakura to Hontō no Omoi" (Japanese: さくらと本当の想い)	Hiroyuki Tanaka	Nanase Ohkawa	March 21, 2000	December 14, 2001	March 8, 2003
Sakura ponders over Syaoran's confession and is confused about her own feelings for him. Meanwhile hearing word that Eriol is leaving for England, they decided to visit his house for an explanation. While there, Eriol explained that the cards needed to be handed over to the new owner, but without a reason, the cards would run amuck. He refused to reveal his identity sooner because he knew Sakura would do her best if she did not know what was going on. It also turns out that Kaho Mizuki also knew his identity (he was the one who gave her the bell). Eriol explains he knew how everything was going to turn out apart from one detail: he believed that Yukito would romantically love Sakura in return, however, he loves Toya, and Sakura loves Syaoran. With the incidents resolved and the cards converted, Syaoran secretly plans to return to Hong Kong. As he is preparing to leave, Tomoyo finds out and tells Sakura. Heartbroken, Sakura says that she does not want him to go and that she may indeed love him. Her tears create a new blank Sakura Card with a loving heart on it. Before Syaoran departs, Sakura rushes to the airport. Though she does not yet confess her true feelings, she accepts the bear Syaoran gives her and wonders if she will see him again.

=== Specials ===
No.	Title	Directed by	Written by	Original release date
1	"You're Wonderful, Sakura-chan! Tomoyo's Cardcaptor Sakura Video Diary!"; Transliteration: "Suteki desu wa, Sakura-chan! Tomoyo no Kādokyaputā Sakura Katsuyaku Bideo Nikki!" (Japanese: すてきですわ、さくらちゃん! 知世のカードキャプターさくら 活躍ビデオ日記!)	Tetsurō Araki	Tsutomu Kaneko	May 22, 1999 (Note: The Sakura Video Diary specials were received by providing proof of purchase of the required home video releases. The release dates provided are based on the release date of the final volume required to receive the special. The actual release date is likely sometime later, but an exact date is not known.)
Bonus video for purchasing Volumes 1-9 of the Laserdisc or VHS release for the TV series Tomoyo wants to produce what she calls a "Sakura-chan Memorial" and is shown recording scenes featured in the opening theme song video of the first season, including a scene where Sakura sings the theme song. When the opening video is completed, Tomoyo reveals to Sakura that the project encompasses 35 episodes of Sakura's exploits while she captured the Clow Cards in the first season, which will be broadcast on TV, much to Sakura's embarrassment. The completed opening video is shown with Sakura singing the song "Catch You Catch Me". Chronologically, this takes place anytime after episode 35.
2	"You're Wonderful, Sakura-chan! Tomoyo's Cardcaptor Sakura Video Diary 2!"; Transliteration: "Suteki desu wa, Sakura-chan! Tomoyo no Kādokyaputā Sakura Katsuyaku Bideo Nikki 2!" (Japanese: すてきですわ、さくらちゃん! 知世のカードキャプターさくら 活躍ビデオ日記 2!)	Tetsurō Araki	Tsutomu Kaneko	May 25, 2000
Bonus video for purchasing Volumes 10-18 of the Laserdisc, VHS, or DVD release for the TV series Sakura, Tomoyo and Eriol are making cupcakes at Sakura's house, but right after completing them, they start mysteriously disappearing. Suspecting Kero must be the culprit, Sakura and Tomoyo go to check on him, but find him still tied up with the ribbon Sakura had tied him in to prevent him from eating the sweets. With no proof Kero ate the cupcakes, Sakura and Tomoyo go back downstairs, but now Eriol has to leave. While baking a cake, Kero's ribbon unties itself, letting Kero—who can smell the cake baking—come downstairs. Sakura uses the Create card to finish the cake, and the Move card to prevent Kero from eating it. In the process, they find out it really was Kero who somehow ate the cupcakes earlier, and outside Eriol is shown holding the ribbon that Kero had been tied up in. Chronologically, this takes place anytime after episode 53.
3	"You're Wonderful, Sakura-chan! Tomoyo's Cardcaptor Sakura Video Diary Special!"; Transliteration: "Suteki desu wa, Sakura-chan! Tomoyo no Kādokyaputā Sakura Katsuyaku Bideo Nikki Supesharu!" (Japanese: すてきですわ、さくらちゃん! 知世のカードキャプターさくら 活躍ビデオ日記 スペシャル!)	Akane Inoue	Tsutomu Kaneko	May 25, 2000
Bonus video for purchasing Volumes 1-9 of the DVD release for the TV series Sakura and her friends overhear Yamazaki saying that in addition to the usual red mailboxes, there are blue ones too. Everyone assumes it is just one of his usual lies, but Sakura and her friends come across a blue mailbox after school. Meilin recalls Yamazaki opening his eyes while telling the story, and this is confirmed after a look at the video tape Tomoyo was recording of Sakura at the time. Meilin realizes that Yamazaki must only tell the truth when he opens his eyes. They rush outside when they hear Yamazaki and Chiharu coming, and watch as, while his eyes are open, Yamazaki says that if someone mails a letter to someone he or she loves in the blue mailbox, that person will love them too. Sakura, Syaoran and Meilin go to write letters, and it is revealed later on that Yamazaki was only opening his eyes because Chiharu stepped on his foot, and the mailbox was blue because of a spilled paint can. Not knowing this, Sakura, Syaoran and Meilin fight over who gets to mail their letter first while Tomoyo records it. Chronologically, this takes place sometime between episodes 23 and 35.

== Films ==
No.	Title	Directed by	Written by	Original release date
1	"Cardcaptor Sakura: The Movie"; Transliteration: "Gekijōban Kādokyaputā Sakura" (Japanese: 劇場版カードキャプターさくら)	Morio Asaka	Nanase Ohkawa	August 21, 1999
2	"Cardcaptor Sakura Movie 2: The Sealed Card"; Transliteration: "Gekijōban Kādokyaputā Sakura Fūin Sareta Kādo" (Japanese: 劇場版カードキャプターさくら 封印されたカード)	Morio Asaka	Nanase Ohkawa	July 15, 2000
