= Buying Mittens =

Short story by writer Nankichi Niimi

- Short story by Nankichi Niimi
- Original title: 手袋を買いに
- Country: Japan
- Language: Japanese

Publication
- Publication date: 1943

"Buying Mittens" (手袋を買いに, Tebukuro wo kai ni) is a short story in children's literature by Nankichi Niimi. It was first published in 1943 after his death. The story talks about a fox child who goes to the nearby town to buy some gloves.

== Plot ==
When a cold winter comes to the forest, a little fox awakens one morning to the magic of a first snow-fall. His romp in the snow is cut short, however, when his cold, wet paws turn peony colored. What he needs, his mother decides, are some woolen mittens the size of his little paws.

So begins an overnight journey into the village where humans live, to buy a pair of mittens and where, along the way, the little fox learns that people are more complicated creatures than he thought.
