= Nankichi Niimi =

Japanese writer (1913–1943)

Nankichi Niimi (新美 南吉, Niimi Nankichi; July 30, 1913 – March 22, 1943) was a Japanese author, sometimes known as the Hans Christian Andersen of Japan.

Niimi was born Shōhachi Watanabe (渡邊 正八, Watanabe Shōhachi) in Yanabe, in the city of Handa, Aichi prefecture, on July 30, 1913. He lost his mother when he was four years old. His literary skill was noticeable at an early age. During his elementary school graduation ceremony, he presented a haiku that impressed most people at the ceremony.

The Dandelion
So Many Days Trampled
Today’s Flower

At age 18, Niimi moved to Tokyo to enter the Tokyo University of Foreign Studies. He fell sick with tuberculosis while in Tokyo shortly after graduating, and returned to his hometown. He worked there, first as an elementary school teacher, then as a women's high school teacher. He died at age 29.

Although not prolific, he shows great talent in all of his writings. His works are known for their accuracy and lively depictions of humans. He is also often compared to Kenji Miyazawa. There is a Niimi Nankichi Memorial Museum in his birthplace, Handa.

== Works ==
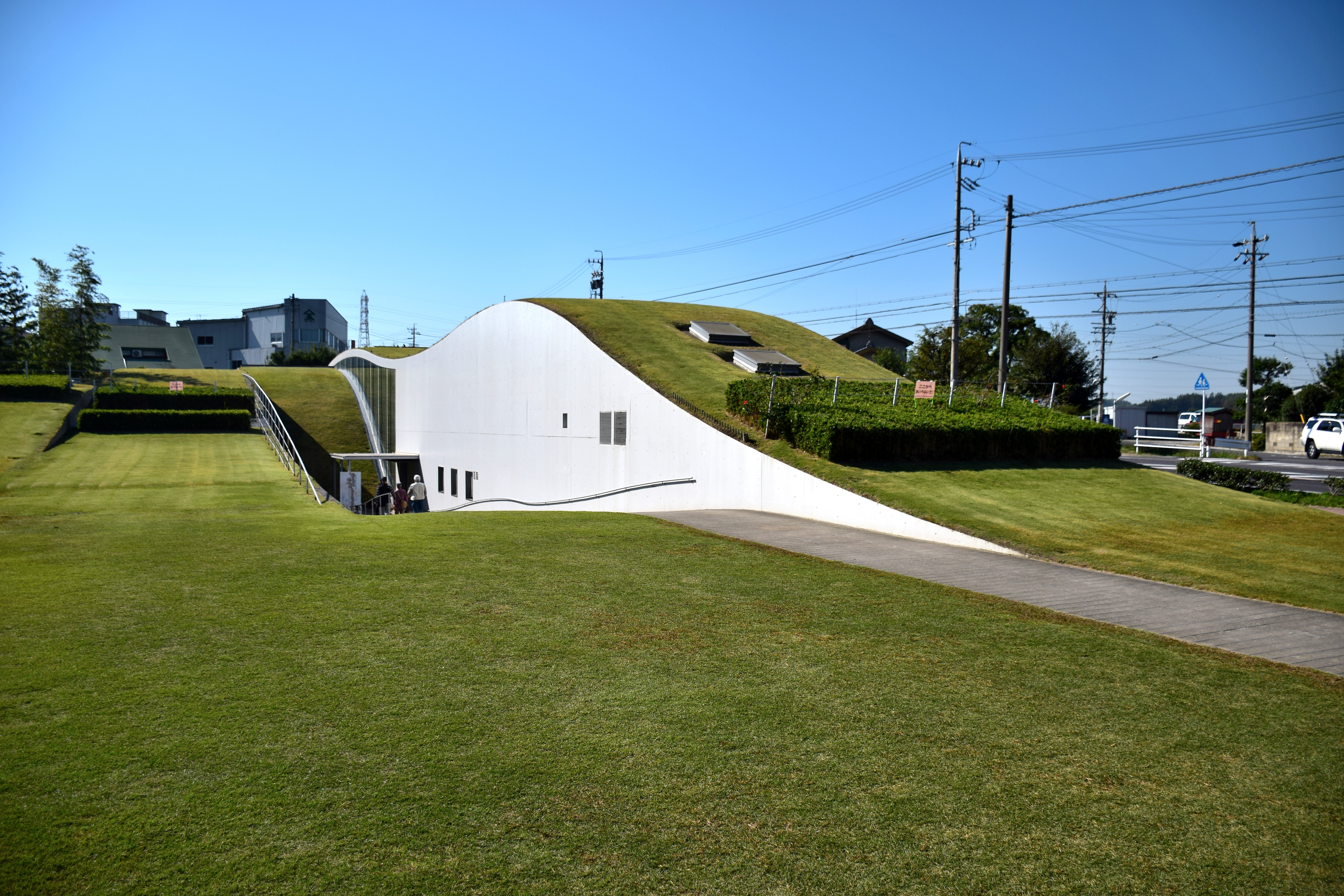
Nankichi Niimi Memorial Museum

(Some are given only with the Japanese title)

- Gon, the Little Fox (Japanese: ごんぎつね): This is his most famous work, which he wrote when he was only seventeen years old. This story of an orphaned fox that dies young somewhat parallels his own life.
- Buying Mittens (Japanese: 手袋を買いに): This is another famous work of his.
- Grandfather’s Lamp (Japanese: おぢいさんのランプ), published 1942
- Hananoki Village and the Thieves (Japanese: 花のき村と盗人たち)
- A Tale of Ryôkan: a Ball and a Child at a Basin, published 1941
- Ushi wo tsunaida tsubaki no ki (Temporary Translation: A camellia tree to which a cow was tethered)
- Lie (Japanese: うそ)

== See also ==
- Japanese literature
- List of Japanese authors
