= Inuyashiki =

Japanese manga series

- First tankōbon volume cover, featuring Ichirō Inuyashiki

いぬやしき
- Genre: Body horror; Science fiction thriller; Superhero
- Manga
- Written by: Hiroya Oku
- Published by: Kodansha
- English publisher: NA: Kodansha USA
- Imprint: Evening KC
- Magazine: Evening
- Original run: January 28, 2014 – July 25, 2017
- Volumes: 10
- Anime television series
- Directed by: Keiichi Sato (chief); Shūhei Yabuta
- Produced by: Miho Matsumoto; Taku Matsuo
- Written by: Hiroshi Seko
- Music by: Yoshihiro Ike
- Studio: MAPPA
- Licensed by: Amazon Prime Video; Crunchyroll
- Original network: Fuji TV (Noitamina)
- Original run: October 12, 2017 – December 22, 2017
- Episodes: 11
- Live-action film
- Inuyashiki (2018)
- icon

Inuyashiki (Japanese: いぬやしき) is a Japanese manga series written and illustrated by Hiroya Oku. It was serialized in Kodansha's seinen manga magazine Evening from January 2014 to July 2017, with its chapters collected in 10 tankōbon volumes. The story follows two people who, via a mysterious event, are endowed with superhuman abilities, but the way they choose to use these abilities is completely different.

An 11-episode anime television series adaptation produced by MAPPA aired on Fuji TV's late night programming block Noitamina from October to December 2017. A live-action film adaptation premiered in April 2018.

== Plot ==
Inuyashiki Ichiro is an older, friendless man with an uncaring family. One fateful evening in a nearly empty public park, he is struck by an explosion of extraterrestrial origin, and his body is replaced by an incredibly powerful, but still outwardly human, mechanical body. He quickly realizes the extent of his body's powers, and after saving a homeless man being beaten by a pack of teenagers, he decides to dedicate himself to doing good, using his powers to heal those with incurable diseases and fight crime.

However, a teenager who was with him at the time of the explosion, Shishigami Hiro, had the same fate as Ichiro, but unlike Inuyashiki, Shishigami becomes a psychopath who goes about using his newfound abilities to murder various people, from classmates that annoy him to innocent families, including young children, just for amusement. His acts of merciless cruelty bring him the attention of the police, who can do nothing to stop him. Hiro becomes the most wanted criminal in the country. The series follows these two different people who once shared the same bizarre experience, as their paths are destined to clash.

== Characters ==
Ichirō Inuyashiki (犬屋敷 壱郎, Inuyashiki Ichirō)
Voiced by: Fumiyo Kohinata
Portrayed by: Noritake Kinashi
The head of the Inuyashiki family who looks older than his age, being 58 years old. He has no friends and is disrespected by his family, with the only thing he trusts being his dog, Hanako. He was on the verge of death, but after being struck by extraterrestrial beings, he was transformed into a cyborg. Not wanting to lose his humanity, he fights to save those in trouble.
Hiro Shishigami (獅子神 皓, Shishigami Hiro)
Voiced by: Nijirō Murakami
Portrayed by: Takeru Satoh
A teenager who was with Inuyashiki when the extraterrestrial beings struck them dead. He also became a cyborg, but he takes pleasure in killing people, which, according to him, keeps him human. The only people he cares about are his mother, his friend Naoyuki, and, later, Shion and her grandmother. His standard method of killing someone is making a finger gun and saying "Bang!", which has the same effect as shooting someone with an actual gun. This will work on anyone who witnesses it, even if played on a television screen. He can also imitate a machine gun by shouting "da-da-da" while pretending to hold one, which will have the same effect.
Naoyuki Andō (安堂 直行, Andō Naoyuki)
Voiced by: Kanata Hongō
Portrayed by: Kanata Hongō
Hiro's childhood friend who initially shut himself in at home after being bullied at school. He is the first person to learn about Inuyashiki and Hiro's cyborg bodies. Wanting to stop his friend from killing, he teams up with Inuyashiki. He is a fan of Gantz, another manga of Hiroya Oku.
Mari Inuyashiki (犬屋敷 麻理, Inuyashiki Mari)
Voiced by: Sumire Uesaka
Portrayed by: Ayaka Miyoshi
Inuyashiki's teenage daughter and a classmate of both Hiro and Andō. She secretly wants to become a manga artist.
Shion Watanabe (渡辺 しおん, Watanabe Shion)
Voiced by: Sumire Morohoshi
Portrayed by: Fumi Nikaido
A classmate of Hiro who has a crush on him. She sheltered Hiro at her home after he first escaped from the police, and became another woman that Hiro loved.

== Production ==
During Hiroya Oku's work on Gantz for Shueisha's Weekly Young Jump, editor Shiota offered him a position at Kodansha's bimonthly magazine Evening. The publication's smaller scale and flexibility would allow Oku to develop his ideas with complete creative freedom. He accepted and began developing what would become Inuyashiki. Before completing Gantz, Oku drew inspiration from the film Astro Boy for the story of a deceased man revived as a super robot, which evolved into the narrative of Inuyashiki and Hiro—two characters seeking, in their own ways, to regain their humanity. The series proposal was approved, and Oku maintained near-total creative independence, with minimal editorial oversight from Shiota. For the title, Oku sought an ambiguous word that would intrigue readers. He selected "Inuyashiki" ('dog mansion'), a surname that does not exist in Japan, in contrast to the similar "Nekoyashiki" ('cat mansion'), which does appear in Japanese records.

== Media ==
=== Manga ===
Written and illustrated by Hiroya Oku, Inuyashiki was serialized in Kodansha's seinen manga magazine Evening, from January 28, 2014, to July 25, 2017. Kodansha collected its 85 chapters in ten tankōbon volumes, released from May 23, 2014, to September 22, 2017.

Kodansha USA licensed the manga for English release in North America in 2014. The ten volumes were released from August 25, 2015, to December 19, 2017. Crunchyroll started publishing the manga in a digital format in 2015; the service is set to end in December 2023.

==== Volumes ====
No.	Original release date	Original ISBN	English release date	English ISBN
01	May 23, 2014	978-4-06-354517-3	August 25, 2015	9781632361219
1. "The Vicissitudes of Life" (人生いろいろ, Jinsei Iroiro); 2. "Abnormality" (異変, Ihen); 3. "Oh My God" (なんてこった, Nantekotta); 4. "No Tears" (涙も出ない, Namida mo Denai); 5. "Violence" (凶行, Kyōkō); 6. "Help Me God" (神様助けて, Kamisama Tasukete); 7. "Ichiro Inuyashiki" (犬屋敷壱郎, Inuyashiki Ichirō); 8. "Man Without An Inside" (中身のない人間, Nakami no Nai Ningen)
02	October 23, 2014	978-4-06-354541-8	November 24, 2015	9781632361318
9. "The Other One" (もう一つの存在, Mō Hitotsu no Sonzai); 10. "Hiro Shishigami" (獅子神皓, Shishigami Hiro); 11. "Tragedy" (惨劇, Sangeki); 12. "Plea" (懇願, Kongan); 13. "The Same Thing" (同じモノ, Onaji Mono); 14. "I Will Handle Them" (私が相手だ, Watashi ga Aite Da); 15. "Across the Sky" (空をこえて, Sora o Koete); 16. "Got Your Back" (守ってやる, Mamotte Yaru); 17. "Their Powers" (それぞれの力, Sorezore no Chikara)
03	February 23, 2015	978-4-06-354556-2	February 23, 2016	9781632362056
18. "Normal Happiness" (普通の幸せ, Futsū no Shiawase); 19. "Assault" (強襲, Kyōshū); 20. "Mine" (俺のモノ, Ore no Mono); 21. "Despair" (絶望, Zetsubō); 22. "Unforgiveable" (許せない, Yurusenai); 23. "Help" (助ける, Tasukeru); 24. "Declaration of War" (宣戦布告, Sensenfukoku); 25. "What Are You?" (お前はなんだ!?, Omae wa Nan Da!?); 26. "Divine Punishment" (神罰, Shinbatsu)
04	July 23, 2015	978-4-06-354580-7	June 28, 2016	9781632362636
27. "It's Okay" (大丈夫, Daijōbu); 28. "There is Another" (もう一人いる, Mō Hitori Iru); 29. "Hero" (ヒーロー, Hīrō); 30. "Hiro" (皓, Hiro); 31. "Training" (特訓, Tokkun); 32. "As Far As You Can" (行けるとこまで, Ikeru Toko Made); 33. "Savior" (救世主, Yūseisha); 34. "Change" (変化, Henka); 35. "Escape" (逃走, Tōsō)
05	November 20, 2015	978-4-06-354596-8	October 18, 2016	9781632362971
36. "Shion" (しおん, Shion); 37. "Lamentation" (慟哭, Dōkoku); 38. "Kill You All" (全員殺す, Zenin Korosu); 39. "Punishment" (制裁, Seisai); 40. "Is 3 Alive?" (3は生きてるか?, San wa Ikiteru ka?); 41. "Do I Look Human?" (人間に見える?, Ningen ni Mieru?); 42. "Don't Leave Us Behind" (おいてかないで, Oitekanai de); 43. "Spread the Message" (拡散お願いします, Kakusan Onegaishimasu); 44. "A Pleasant Day" (穏やかな日, Odayakana Hi)
06	April 22, 2016	978-4-06-354616-3	February 21, 2017	9781632363428
45. "Raid" (強襲, Kyōshū); 46. "Sorry" (ごめん, Gomen); 47. "Mari" (麻理, Mari); 48. "Concentrated Fire" (集中砲火, Shūchūhōka); 49. "See it Through" (見届けてよ, Mitodokete yo); 50. "Awakening" (覚醒, Kakusei); 51. "Not Yet" (まだだよ, Mada Da yo); 52. "Trailing" (尾行, Bikō); 53. "Declaration" (宣言, Sengen)
07	August 23, 2016	978-4-06-354633-0	June 20, 2017	9781632364364
54. "Sniping" (狙撃, Sogeki); 55. "Test Drive" (試験運転, Shiken Kōten); 56. "God and the Devil" (神と悪魔, Kami to Akuma); 57. "Beginning of Ruin" (破滅の始まり, Hamtesu no Hajimari); 58. "Plane Crash" (墜落, Tsuiraku); 59. "Steel Rain" (鉄の雨, Tetsu no Ame); 60. "Desperation Gambit" (絶体絶命, Zettaizetsumei); 61. "The Same" (同じモノ, Onaji Mono)
08	January 23, 2017	978-4-06-354655-2	August 22, 2017	9781632364890
62. "Pitched Battle" (激闘, Gekidō); 63. "Aerial Battle" (空中戦, Kūchūsen); 64. "Conclusion?!" (決着!?, Ketchaku!?); 65. "Automated Battle" (自動戦闘, Jidō Sentō); 66. "Destruction" (破壊, Hakai); 67. "Salvation" (救え, Sukue); 68. "Come Back" (帰って来て, Kaettekite); 69. "Daddy" (お父さん, Otō-san)
09	May 23, 2017	978-4-06-354668-2	October 17, 2017	9781632365545
70. "The Reason I Was Born" (生まれた理由, Umareta Riyū); 71. "Father's Confession" (父親の告白, Chichioya no Kokuhaku); 72. "Reunion" (再会, Saikai); 73. "Loss" (喪失, Sōshitsu); 74. "Result of the Grotesque" (異形なる者の果て, Igyō Naru Mono no Hate); 75. "Even a Hobbit" (ホビットでも, Hobitto Demo); 76. "Do Your Worst" (Just do as you will...); 77. "Vision of the End" (終末の情, Shūmatsu no Jō)
10	September 22, 2017	978-4-06-354688-0	December 19, 2017	9781632366078
78. "What I Can Do" (自分に出来ること, Jibun ni Dekiru Koto); 79. "Father, Thou Shalt Not Die" (父死にたまふことなかれ, Chichi Shi ni Tama Fu Koto Nakare); 80. "If This Was Armageddon" (アルマゲドンだったら, Arumagedon Dattara); 81. "Still He Fought Against Despair" (それでも絶望に抗う, Soredemo Zetsubō ni Aragau); 82. "Why Are You Here...?" (なんでここに・・・?, Nande Koko ni...?); 83. "For Whose Sake" (誰が為に。, Tagatameni); 84. "Ichiro Inuyashiki" (犬屋敷壱郎, Inuyashiki Ichirō); Final chapter. "Last Hero"

=== Anime ===
An anime television series adaptation by MAPPA began airing on October 12, 2017, and a live-action film adaptation has been announced for 2018. The opening theme is "My Hero", performed by Man with a Mission, while the ending theme song is "Ai o Oshietekureta Kimi e" (愛を教えてくれた君へ; lit. 'To You Who Taught Me Love'), performed by the band Qaijff. Amazon had licensed the series and streamed it online on Amazon Prime Video in Japan and overseas. It was streamed on Anime Strike in the United States. Amazon discontinued Anime Strike on January 5, 2018, which in turn made their titles, including Inuyashiki, free to stream for Prime members. The anime series became available on Crunchyroll on April 26, 2023.

==== Episodes ====
No.	Title (Note: All English episode titles are taken from Anime Strike.)	Directed by	Original release date
1	"Ichirō Inuyashiki"; Transliteration: "Inuyashiki Ichirō" (Japanese: 犬屋敷壱郎)	Shūhei Yabuta	October 12, 2017
Salaryman Ichirō Inuyashiki feels trapped within his humdrum life and aging body, automatically going through his workday routines. When he takes his wife and children to their new modest home, the children are unimpressed. After a visit to the doctor, where he is diagnosed with stomach cancer and given 3 months to live, he tries to call his family, but they ignore him. One evening, while walking his dog in a park on a hill, he breaks down and cries. Suddenly, he and a young man standing nearby are struck by a mysterious explosion, apparently of extraterrestrial origin. His body is replaced by an incredibly powerful, but still outwardly human, mechanical body. He realizes some of his body's powers after saving a homeless man being beaten by a group of teenagers. The electronics within his body also manage to identify and expose the teenagers to the public. He then realizes that even though his body is now an electromechanical cyborg, he still thinks and feels like a human.
2	"Hiro Shishigami"; Transliteration: "Shishigami Hiro" (Japanese: 獅子神皓)	Hirokazu Yamada	October 19, 2017
Student Hiro Shishigami remarks that one of his friends, Naoyuki Andou, has been absent from school and goes to visit him. Hiro says that he is no longer human and demonstrates some of his powers. Naoyuki is impressed, until Hiro causes cars to start crashing in the street and realizes that they are not just tricks. Hiro reveals his cyborg body and convinces Naoyuki to return to school, calmly offering to kill the student who beat him up. Naoyuki, however, is fearful of Hiro's mental state and powers. After leaving Naoyuki's house, Hiro picks a house at random and casually kills the occupants by shooting an invisible beam while making a finger gun gesture. He remarks that he feels 'alive'. When the daughter comes home, Hiro threatens to kill her, and Ichirō hears her screams of fear. He drives, following the voice he hears in his head, until he hears her die. He finally arrives at the house, finding the bodies, but is confronted by Hiro, who shoots him in the head. As Hiro leaves, however, Ichirō has already recovered and stands at the doorway, much to Hiro's amazement.
3	"Naoyuki Ando"; Transliteration: "Andō Naoyuki" (Japanese: 安堂直行)	Kazuya Aiura	October 26, 2017
Surprised at Ichirō's recovery, Hiro uses the jets in his back to fly off. Ichirō realizes that Hiro has undergone the same metamorphosis as him but cannot understand his motivation. Hiro again visits Naoyuki, who still refuses to return to school. Meanwhile, Ichirō sees some thugs take a young man into an alley. He follows them and beats them up using only his physical strength. He then hears the voices of people trapped in a building on fire, and tries to invoke the flying mechanism he saw Hiro use. Desperately trying, he sings the Astro Boy theme song and takes off but has difficulty controlling the jets. He eventually reaches the scene, rescuing those trapped inside. Hiro finally convinces Naoyuki to return to school, but when bullies threaten Naoyuki, Hiro intervenes and forces them to back off. Later that afternoon, he kills the bullies at a distance as Naoyuki watches. Hiro describes to Naoyuki his many powers, including control over electronic devices, including milking an ATM. Naoyuki then says that he can no longer be friends with someone who kills and steals, and Hiro walks off. That evening, Ichirō discovers his healing power when he revives a cat that had been run over. Meanwhile, Hiro again enters a house at random and kills all the occupants.
4	"Samejima"; Transliteration: "Samejima" (Japanese: 鮫島)	Tatsufumi Itō	November 2, 2017
A Yakuza is sexually assaulted by his boss Samejima for the death of a woman from a drug overdose. Elsewhere, Fumino Inoue, a young woman working in a café, becomes engaged to her boyfriend, Satoru, but she is abducted on the way home by Samejima's men. She is injected with drugs for the purpose of sexual assault but wounds Samejima and manages to escape and return home to Satoru. Before they can act, Samejima and his men burst into their apartment to take Fumino. Samejima begins to choke Satoru, but, suddenly, Ichirō arrives at the apartment, and disables the men. Ichirō begins to crush Samejima, who pulls out a gun and shoots Ichirō in the head, causing Ichirō to collapse. When Ichirō wakes up, he is alone in the apartment with a dead Satoru, but Ichirō manages to revive him. Meanwhile, he traces Samejima and flies to find him at a Yakuza meeting. He calls out Samejima and beats him up. When the rest of the Yakuza fire volleys of bullets into Ichirō, his cyborg body's self-defense mechanism activates, and laser beams from his power pack blind and maim the men, leaving them all crippled for life. He then tracks down Fumino, rescues her, and reunites her with Satoru.
5	"Yuko Shishigami"; Transliteration: "Shishigami Yūko" (Japanese: 獅子神優子)	Yasunori Gotō	November 9, 2017
There are media reports of the attack on the Koudankai crime syndicate and that another home in the Suganami ward was attacked by a type of firearm, but there was no sign of bullets. At school, Hiro and Naoyuki are suspected by the other students to be responsible for the deaths of the bullies. Naoyuki tries to report Hiro but cannot bring himself to do so. After reading about people with serious illnesses being miraculously cured, Naoyuki suspects Hiro, but dismisses it, thinking there may be others like him with similar powers. In order to find out, he screams out that he is going to be killed, and Ichirō arrives at his door. When Ichirō admits who he is, Naoyuki vows to help him stop Hiro even if it means killing the latter. Fellow classmate Shion Watanabe confesses her feelings to Hiro, who thanks her. That night, Naoyuki gets Ichirō to test his powers, but he has trouble controlling them. Meanwhile, Hiro's mother, Yuko Shishigami, tells him that she has cancer and only months to live, and Hiro cures her. The next morning, she finds that she has been cured, and Hiro vows to stop killing for his mother's sake. However, after the media report a breakthrough in the household murder cases, police surround Hiro's home and attempt to take him into custody.
6	"People of 2 Chan"; Transliteration: "Nichan no hito tachi" (Japanese: 2chの人たち)	Hirokazu Yamada	November 16, 2017
Hiro escapes the grasp of the police and flees, taking refuge at Shion's house. Meanwhile, Naoyuki tells Ichirō that Hiro integrated his mobile phone into his electronics system and gets Ichirō to do the same. In testing the communication distance, Ichirō flies as high as an orbiting satellite. While laying low over the next few days, Hiro finds out that people are insulting his mother on 2chan. Ashamed at Hiro's actions and hounded by the media, his mother commits suicide. Distraught at his mother's death, Hiro goes to his father's house. Finding the media talking to his father outside the house, he kills them in front of his father and then seeks revenge against everybody on 2channel who posted insults. He kills them by hacking their computers and shooting them though their computer screens.
7	"Shion Watanabe"; Transliteration: "Watanabe Shion" (Japanese: 渡辺しおん)	Yasuhiro Geshi	November 23, 2017
Hiro returns to Shion's house, overwhelmed by recent events. In a flashback, Hiro waits for a train in a crowded underground station, and a middle-aged man steps in front of it. Later, Hiro admits to Shion that he is the killer, but she refuses to believe it. He tells her about the railway incident, the pleasure he felt when a life was erased, and how alive he now feels at taking other people's lives. She refuses to accept that he is not human until he carries her into the sky. Rather than fear for her life, she pleads with him to stay with her and her grandmother. Changing his mind, Hiro decides to save the lives of people who are about to die. Hiro begins healing people on a daily basis, bringing much joy to Shion. Two months later, Hiro and Shion are leading happy lives, but the police have managed to track him down.
8	"Mari Inuyashiki"; Transliteration: "Inuyashiki Mari" (Japanese: 犬屋敷麻理)	Hirokazu Yamada; Kiyoshi Matsuda; Junichirō Hashiguchi; Takeo Shudō	November 30, 2017
A police SAT squad invades Shion's house and commences shooting at Hiro, also killing Shion and her grandmother. Under the intense attack, he grabs their bodies and flies off, later using his healing power to restore them to life. Ichirō tells Naoyuki about his estrangement from Mari Inuyashiki, his daughter, and they practice using Ichirō's powers. Mari is surprised to see Naoyuki with her father and follows them to a hospital, where she discovers that her father is the mysterious miracle healer. That evening, Mari tells her parents that she wants to write manga rather than go to college, and Ichirō supports her decision. Hiro assaults the Gokokuji Police Station, killing every officer but one. As Hiro leaves, he is shot by a sniper and fired at by a police assault team. Unconscious, his self-protection mechanism raises him off the ground and fires rockets, wiping out the entire assault team and surrounding police.
9	"People of Shinjuku"; Transliteration: "Shinjuku no Hito-tachi" (Japanese: 新宿の人たち)	Yasunori Gotō	December 7, 2017
The Ichirō family watch TV news of the attack on Gokokuji Police Station by Hiro. Suddenly, Hiro announces on all broadcast television stations that he is declaring war on the country and vows to kill the entire population of 120 million people. He begins killing people at random in the streets of Shinjuku, creating panic. He then telephones a TV presenter and kills him while he is broadcasting live on air. Naoyuki realizes that Hiro is using smartphones to kill people and, through Ichirō, issues a public warning. Hiro realizes that Naoyuki is working against him. Hiro then begins killing people via TV screens and threatens to kill 1,000 people a day. He offers to take Shion and her grandmother away, but she refuses and asks him to stop the killing. The next day, Hiro crashes an in-flight passenger airplane into the city.
10	"People of Tokyo"; Transliteration: "Tōkyō no Hito-tachi" (Japanese: 東京の人たち)	Tatsufumi Itō	December 14, 2017
Hiro crashes multiple passenger airplanes into Tokyo; however, Ichirō manages to save some airplanes by landing them in the bay. Meanwhile, Mari is trapped in a burning building and telephones her father for help. As Ichirō is about to fly to save her, Hiro finds him. After a brief discussion, Hiro realizes that they were both in the park when they were struck by a mysterious explosion, which resulted in them metamorphosing into the cyborgs that they are now. However, Ichirō has become a hero while Hiro sees himself as the villain. Hiro attacks Ichirō, but they are evenly matched, and while Ichirō tries to reach his daughter, they battle with all of the comprehensive internal weapon systems available to them. Eventually, Ichirō manages to damage Hiro, and they both fall to the ground. Ichirō recovers, reaches Mari's lifeless body, and desperately tries to save her. He finally manages to resurrect her, then goes to save others killed during Hiro's attack on the city and their subsequent battle. Meanwhile, two young women find and help the severely damaged body of Hiro in a laneway.
11	"People of Earth"; Transliteration: "Chikyū no Hito-tachi" (Japanese: 地球の人たち)	Kiyoshi Matsuda	December 21, 2017
Ichirō reveals his metamorphosed body to his family, remarking that he may only be a mechanical copy. Although, when he recalls events from their honeymoon, they realize that he has all of his memories of the past and accept him as he is. Hiro visits his friend Naoyuki, just wanting to hang out like before, but Naoyuki calls Ichirō, so Hiro leaves. The family spend some time together, but after hearing news reports of the impending approach of a meteor to Earth, Ichirō decides to do what he can to stop it. He flies into space and tries to destroy the meteor, but fails. Hiro appears, reveals the mechanical body's self-destruct button, and asks Ichirō to push it (lacking arms), saying there are also people on Earth that he wants to save, such as Naoyuki and Shion. Ichirō informs Naoyuki of this, making Naoyuki cry. Ichirō activates Hiro's self-destruct, but it is not enough to stop the meteor, so he activates his own self-destruct mechanism, which successfully destroys the meteor. Following these events, Ichirō's son learns to fend off bullies, and Mari's manga is selected for publication.

=== Live-action film ===
On December 21, 2017, a teaser trailer and website appeared for a live-action adaptation of Inuyashiki. The film, the first in a planned trilogy, was released on April 20, 2018, directed by Shinsuke Sato, who had previously directed the live-action Gantz, and stars Noritake Kinashi as Inuyashiki Ichihiro and Takeru Satoh as Shishigami Hiro.

== Reception ==
=== Manga ===
Inuyashiki was one of the Manga division's Jury Selections at the 18th and 19th Japan Media Arts Festival in 2014 and 2015. The manga has won the French award "Daruma d'or manga" at the Japan Expo Awards 2016. It was picked as a nominee for Best Comic for the 44th Angoulême International Comics Festival in 2017. Inuyashiki was nominated for the Best Comic category at the 49th Seiun Awards in 2018. The series ranked 18th in the first Next Manga Award in the print manga category.

By April 2018, the manga had over 3.1 million copies in circulation. Volume 2 reached the 18th place on the weekly Oricon manga charts and, by November 2, 2014, it had sold 76,886 copies; volume 3 reached the 15th place and, by March 1, 2015, it had sold 74,974 copies.

In February 2021, it was reported that the series, along with Death Note and Tokyo Ghoul, was banned from distribution on two unspecified websites in Russia.

=== Anime ===
At the 2nd Crunchyroll Anime Awards held in 2018, Inuyashiki and its character Hiro Shishigami were nominated for "Best CGI" and "Villain of the Year" respectively.
