= Kei Kurono =

Fictional character in the manga series Gantz

- Gantz character
- Kurono from the manga
- First appearance: Gantz chapter 1 (2000)
- Created by: Hiroya Oku
- Portrayed by: Kazunari Ninomiya
- Voiced by: Japanese; Daisuke Namikawa (anime); Yūki Kaji (Gantz:O); English; Christopher Ayres; Lucien Dodge (Gantz:O)

In-universe information
- Relatives: Akira Kurono (brother, deceased)

Kei Kurono (Japanese: 玄野 計, Hepburn: Kurono Kei ) is a fictional character in the manga series Gantz written by Hiroya Oku. In the story, Kurono is a teenager who feels forced to save a man from a subway train alongside his childhood friend Masaru Kato, but is killed in the process. He is revived by a being known as Gantz and with others is forced to fight aliens hiding in human society. Despite starting as a selfish character who does not care for others, Kurono feels more optimistic when he becomes the leader of the team and starts a romantic relationship with a teenaged girl named Tae Kojima. The character is also present in Gonzo's anime adaptation of the series, live-action films and a CGI film, Gantz: O, where his role and fate highly differ from the original manga.

Kurono was created by Oku as a character that would be relatable to manga readers, resulting in his having multiple weaknesses; he is one of Oku's favorite characters, alongside Kato. He was voiced by Daisuke Namikawa in Japanese and in English by Christopher Ayres. For the live-action films, he was portrayed by Kazunari Ninomiya. Both actors for the anime adaptation stated they enjoyed voicing the character to the point of relating with him.

Critical reception to the character has been mixed. While multiple writers who review manga, anime and other media enjoyed his character traits and growth across the series, he has also been found as an unlikable character due to his indifference toward others and preoccupation with sexual relationships. Similarly, Ninomiya's acting has received mixed opinions by critics.

== Creation and development ==
Hiroya Oku developed Kurono's character with the goal of having manga readers identify with him. He was also created to "make a synthesis of the basic conditions for a work of entertainment". Oku originally created Kurono as a character who would fit in a college comedy series. To make him the Gantz character readers would identify with, the author gave him traits such as his sense of insecurity, fears and other complexes. Before the manga started serialization, Oku told his assistants that with Kurono's exception, all the major characters from the series would die in order to surprise readers with plot twists. As the series continued, Oku felt that Kurono was his favorite character though he stated it might have been because he was the main character. In the making of the live-action adaptations, he felt that Kazunari Ninomiya fit the image of Kurono well. In another interview, Oku said Masaru Kato was his favorite character based on his heroic traits in contrast to Kurono who he felt was a more flawed character with conflicting thoughts.

Gantz: O director Yasushi Kawamura said that as a result of Kato replacing Kurono as the protagonist of the film, he felt unsure of the audience's reaction even if they had not read the original manga. For the live-action series, director Shinsuke Sato said that Ninomiya was perfectly cast for the role, that he visually resembled the manga character and represented the current audience. According to Sato, Kurono goes through some "very subtle changes of the heart" in the manga and Ninomiya could portray those particular qualities.

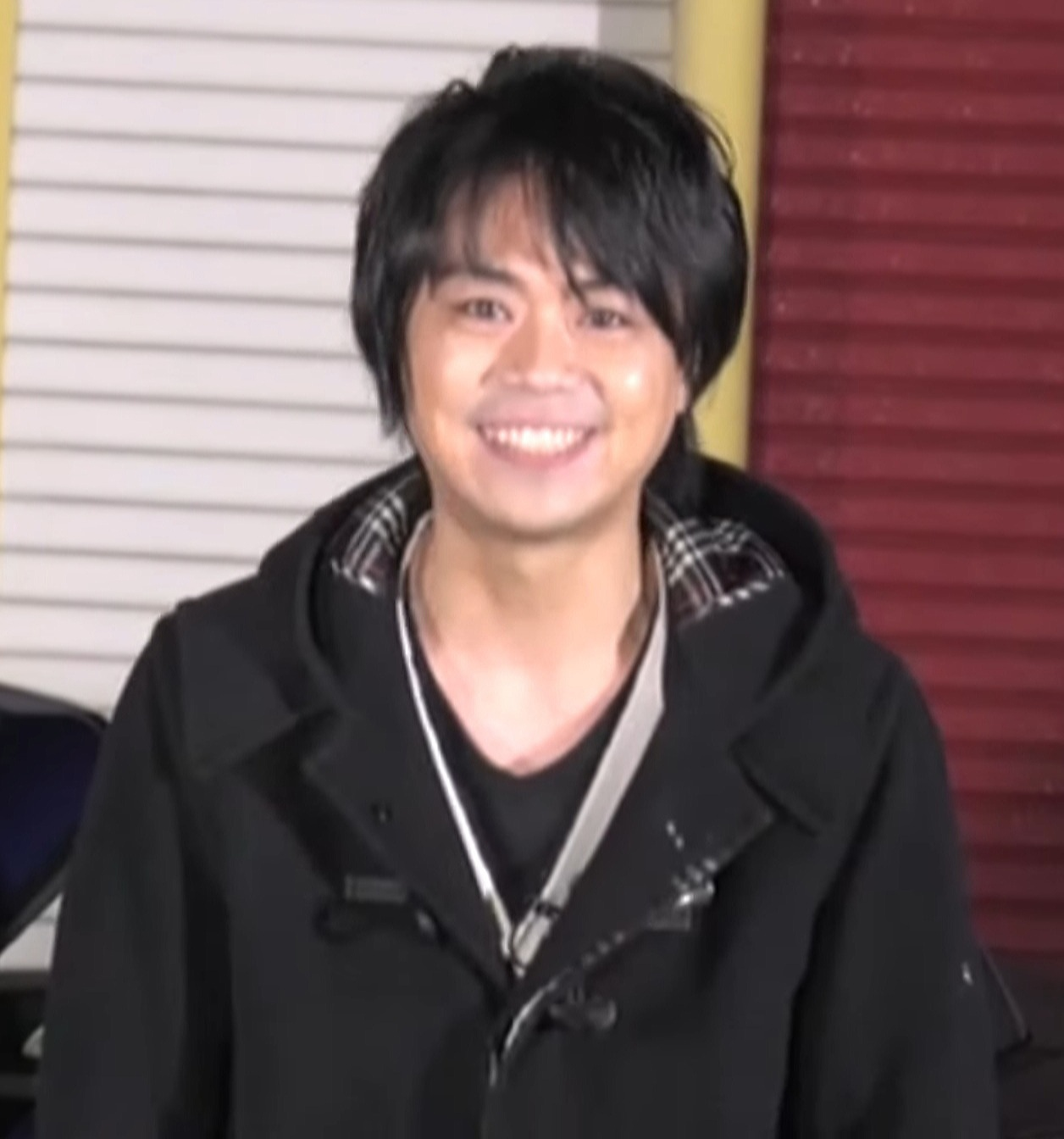
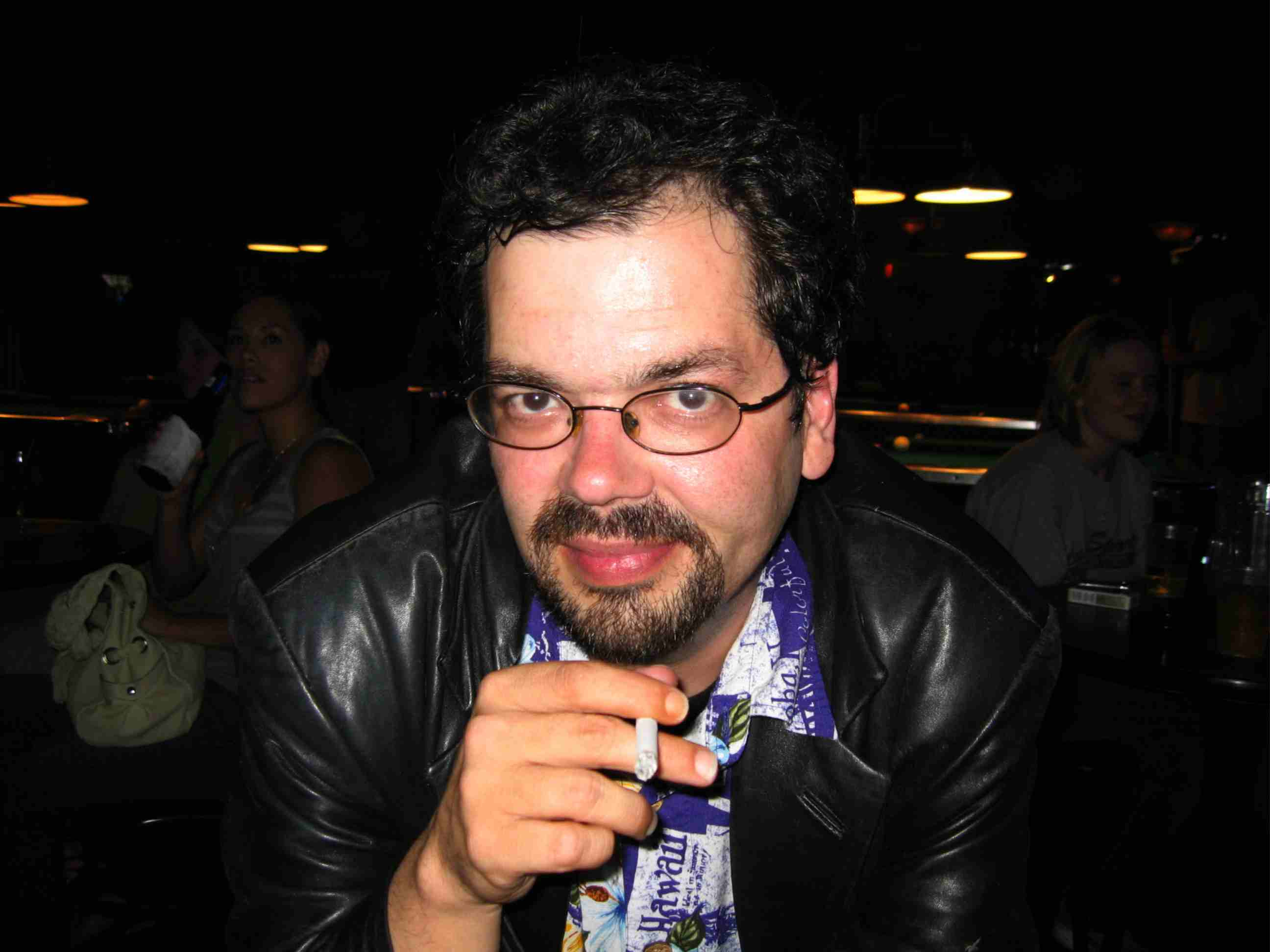
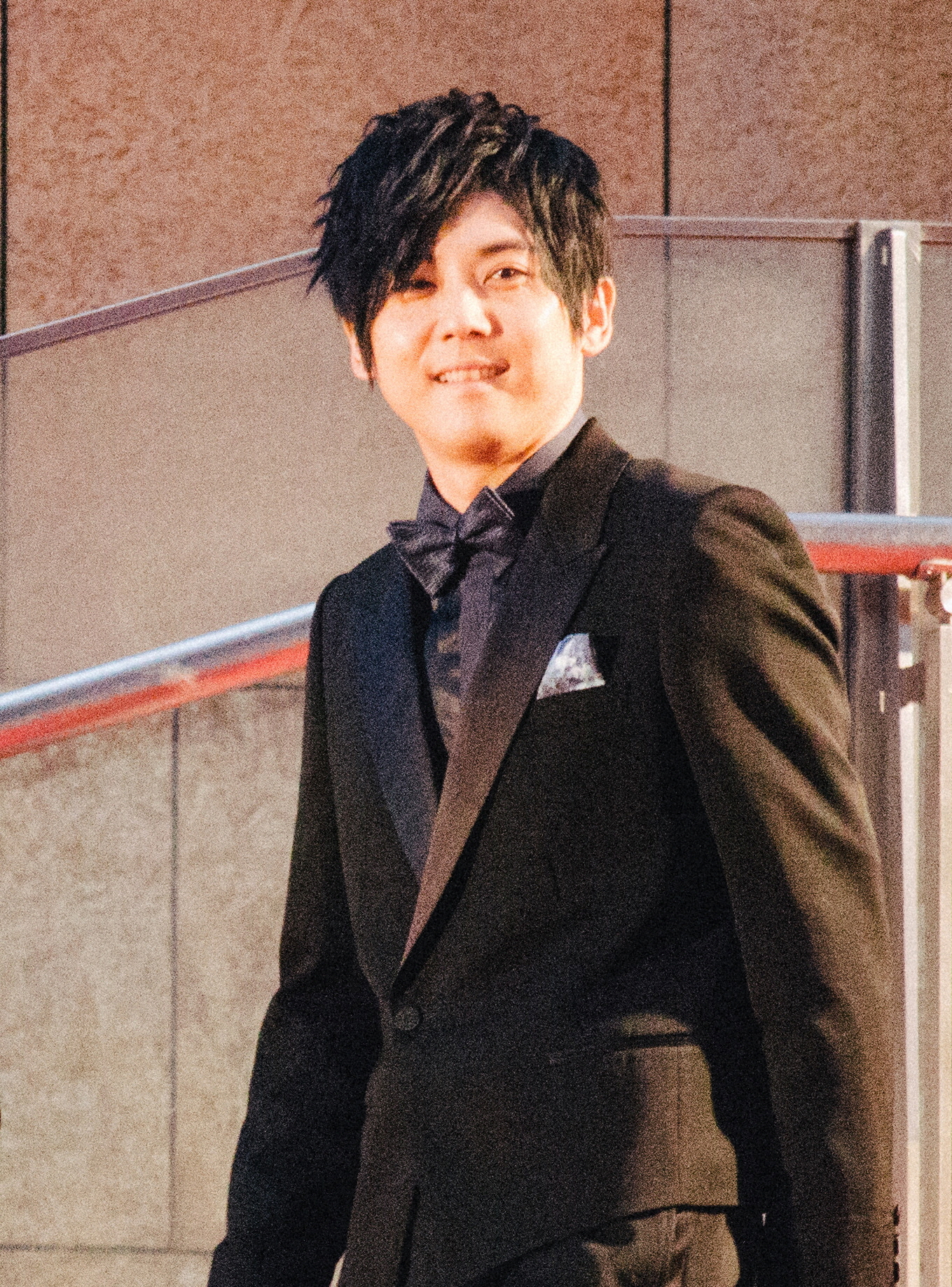
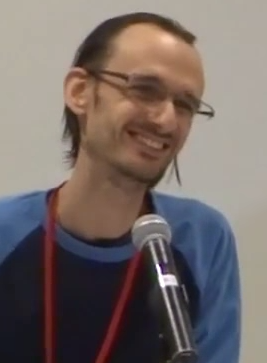
While Daisuke Namikawa and Chris Ayres voiced Kurono in the anime, Yūki Kaji and Lucien Dodge voiced him in the CGI film.

Kurono's Japanese voice actors were Daisuke Namikawa in the anime and Yūki Kaji in Gantz: O. Namikawa stated that his first impression of Kurono was that of an attractive person. However, once reading his lines while interacting with other characters, Namikawa found Kurono cynical and later stated that Kurono was bold due to how he often spoke his mind. Because such people are rare, he felt that viewers would sympathize with Kurono. Due to the frequency of recurring characters dying in the anime, Namikawa joked to fellow actors if they would stop working together and feared Kurono might also die in the plot. He admitted wishing that Kurono would obtain a power to get through difficult situations, and enjoyed seeing Kurono surviving the action scenes in each story arc. Once doing so, Namikawa felt the character became a hero as well as a "great person". Despite liking his character, Namikawa felt it was challenging to voice Kurono.

Kurono's English voice actors were Christopher Ayres in the anime series and Lucien Dodge in Gantz: O. Ayres had previously worked with Matt Greenfield of ADV Films dubbing for Megazone 23. Ayres auditioned for Kurono and for Kato, and was given the former role the following day. He originally thought he was going to voice Kato, but the director felt he was more fitting for voicing Kurono, whom Ayres felt was a "jerk". Initially, most of Ayres's friends told him Kurono was a "jerk and an ass" which left a sudden impression on him. Greenfield did not want Ayres to know of his character online, instead wishing to learn of Kurono while working on the English dub. Upon working in the Gantz dub, he stated "I've always been drawn to anti-heroes and characters with an edge, and Kei is definitely both. I love the fact that he's flawed and makes mistakes [...] Perfect people are so much more boring to play as an actor." He enjoyed working as the character to the point of relating with him.

== Appearances ==
=== In the Gantz manga ===
Introduced in Gantz's first chapter Kei is a 10th grader who, with his childhood friend, Masaru Kato, is struck by a subway train while trying to help a derelict who had passed out on the tracks. They are subsequently summoned by a being known as Gantz that has power over their lives and periodically enlists them on missions to kill aliens hiding amongst humanity. In the beginning, he is a fairly selfish character, with a penchant for sexual perversity with Kei Kishimoto, and often ends up being the reluctant hero. He lives alone in an apartment complex, as he was not on good terms with his family. Wielding Gantz's advanced weaponry such as a suit that increases his physical strength and a powerful gun, Kurono is able to fight enemy aliens targeted by Gantz, often employing unconventional tactics to great effect. However, Kurono remains depressed when Kishimoto starts caring more about Kato than him.

On his third mission, Kurono starts a relationship with a woman but she dies alongside Kato and all of the others, leaving Kurono the sole survivor. Kurono is alone in his next mission in which he kills a large group of aliens, but one survives and kills Kurono's schoolmates in revenge. Kurono manages to save a girl named Tae Kojima and they begin a romantic relationship that gives him a more positive outlook. Kurono starts organizing others on Gantz's missions to avoid casualties, becoming the leader of Tokyo's Gantz Team. His innate skills and physical prowess eventually make him a hero to most of the other members.

After building the team into a capable and successful unit and reviving some of his former friends, Kurono retires from the game at the request of his comrades. A group of aliens known as 'vampires' searches for and eventually finds Kurono, killing him.

After the first mission of Phase 2 in the Gantz storyline, Kei is revived by Kato but remembers nothing beyond his choice to leave the game. Following another mission, Gantz revives an additional copy of Kurono for Reika, unknown to the others. After meeting the original Kurono, he decides to live with Reika. The original Kurono stays with Tae but both are separated when a new race of aliens invade and occupy the planet, abducting Tae. As the original Kurono searches for Tae, the copy assembles with other Gantz members from across the world who wish to save humanity from the aliens. During one of these fights, Reika dies while saving the copy, leaving him with a death wish; he dies when confronting the aliens responsible for the invasion and the Gantz network. The original Kurono manages to save Tae and a large group of humans from the invaders. However, the aliens demand to face Kurono, having labeled him as the strongest fighter on Earth. Kurono accepts the challenge and thanks to Kato and his other allies, he succeeds in defeating the aliens' champion. Following the final fight, Kurono and Kato are received on Earth as heroes.

=== In other media ===
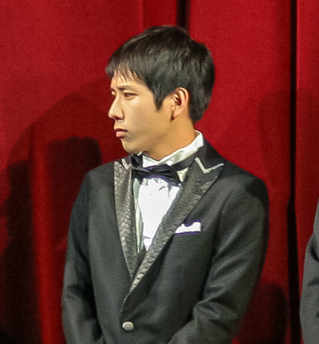
Kazunari Ninomiya portrays Kurono in the live-action films.

In the anime adaptation of Gantz, Kurono becomes the target of the humans after becoming the sole survivor of the third mission. While trying to calm his new enemies, a duo of killers start taking down the people chosen by Gantz. Kurono defeats both of them but is unable to save the others. Gantz then forces him to face his own death again in the subway, ending the summoning of people to the room in the process. A PlayStation 2 game based on the series features Kurono as a playable character.

In the live-action films, Kurono goes through many events from the original manga but is unable to remember Tae following his removal from Gantz's games. Kurono is briefly featured in the CGI film Gantz O facing an alien in the beginning, with both of them dying in the process. He also appears in the ending where it is revealed that Kurono encouraged Kato to abandon Gantz's missions.

== Reception ==
Multiple reactions to Kurono were given by critics for anime, manga and other media. James Musgrove of IGN found his anime rendition to have "all-too-human motivations" juxtaposed with an emergence of his "hidden good side" as the story progresses, and implied that he was an unconventional protagonist. He praised Chris Ayres's acting on Kurono, finding him one of the anime's best voice actors despite it being one of his early works. In the live-action review, Otaku USA called the character an "uneven protagonist" similar to how Kurono is portrayed in the manga and praised his connections with Kato and Kishimoto. Despite criticizing his role, the site compared him with comic book character Peter Parker as both had yet to develop themselves. DVDTalk stated that while the character initially was introduced like a "jerk", he becomes more likable in the anime series as it progressed and liked his interactions with Kishimoto. Anime News Network found Kurono a more-attractive character stating that he "may be one of the freshest and most interesting anime protagonists of the past few years" and that he becomes more interesting across the action scenes, making his relationship with Masaru Kato better received. The anime's exclusive last story arc was noted to make Kurono a more-appealing individual. Fandom Post noted the contrast between the pacifist Kato and the berserker Kurono as the latter does not care about killing enemy aliens and ends up going through an entertaining growth during the final arc where he rejects being forced to fight human beings. Mania Entertainment stated that Kurono has "halfway decent hero material wrapped up in a slimeball package" for how he manages to fight his enemies based on his own childhood when he was used to face multiple challenges. However, Mania still stated that his portrayal of sexual desires might scare young viewers.

The character also received a large number of negative comments. AnimeFringe described Kurono as "the token angst-filled high school student" and criticized his focus on puberty, finding Masaru Kato much more likable due to their differences. In a following review, the site also criticized Kurono's concerns shown in the anime series to the point that the reviewers might lose interest in the series. THEM Anime Reviews similarly found Kurono to be an unlikable character, described him as a "soulless monster" and went on to say "he's mean, extremely selfish, very cynical, and you almost get the feeling he's happy that way, or at least unapologetic. There is no fall from grace; he's already fallen, and has no desire to get back out." A noted example was his inaction when Kei Kishimoto is nearly violated by a gangster in contrast with Kato who tries to save her. Another review from the site noted that despite Kurono's character arc across the series, his changes are brief and Kato was more likable. Anime News Network felt that while Kurono underwent multiple personality changes across the manga, the site stated Oku lacked the talent to make it appealing and heavily criticized his overshadowing relationships with secondary characters.

Critics have also commented on Kurono's role across the live-action films. While noting that Kurono goes through a notable arc in the live-actions, Hobby Consolas found Ninomiya's acting too forced and at the same time his appearance was noted to lack Kurono's physical traits. UK Anime Network praised Kazunari Ninomiya's acting in the second live-action film which manages to make the character more appealing. While finding Kurono more likable than his manga persona based on his growth across the first film and his romantic relationship, Anime News Network stated that fans might miss his original character traits. However, for the second film, another writer for the site said he enjoyed Kurono's growth alongside his relationship with Tae. Japanator agreed with his comments regarding Ninomiya's role due to the notable growth he makes while also finding the actor attractive. Twitch Film stated that Ninomiya is a "standout" for the way he portrays Kurono's character development across the first film. The Japan Times found the relationship between Kurono and Tae simple, referring to them as "a hero (Kei) saving his princess (Tae) from the dragon (the black-clads)."
