= Inuyashiki (film) =

2018 Japanese film

- Theatrical release poster
- Directed by: Shinsuke Sato
- Written by: Hiroshi Hashimoto
- Based on: Inuyashiki by Hiroya Oku
- Produced by: Hirotsugu Usui
- Starring: Noritake Kinashi; Takeru Satoh; Kanata Hongō; Fumi Nikaidō; Ayaka Miyoshi; Katsuhisa Namase; Mari Hamada
- Cinematography: Tarō Kawazu
- Edited by: Tsuyoshi Imai
- Music by: Yutaka Yamada
- Production company: Cinebazar
- Distributed by: Toho
- Release dates: 10 April 2018 (Brussels International Fantastic Film Festival); 20 April 2018 (Japan)
- Running time: 127 minutes
- Country: Japan
- Language: Japanese
- Box office: $5.6 million

Inuyashiki (Japanese: いぬやしき) is a 2018 Japanese superhero film based on the manga series Inuyashiki written and illustrated by Hiroya Oku. The film premiered in April 2018, and it is the first of the planned "Miracle Man" Trilogy. Inuyashiki is directed by Shinsuke Sato and stars Noritake Kinashi, Takeru Satoh, Fumi Nikaidō and Kanata Hongō. It was first announced in December 2016.

== Plot ==
Ichirō Inuyashiki finds himself unable to protect his family, and facing various problems in his home and work life. He has no friends, and is treated poorly by his wife and family. He meets a small dog on the street, which unexpectedly leads him to a park where he is accidentally killed by a crash-landing alien force. To apologize for accidentally killing him, the alien force reconstructs him, changing his body into a highly sophisticated machine that gives him superhero-like powers, with offensive powers and the ability to fly. He also discovers he has the power to heal illnesses which he uses to heal some people, including some who are terminally ill.

However, at the same time, a teenage school boy named Hiro Shishigami also inherited the powers because he was in the impact zone, and was reconstructed as well with similar powers to Ichirō. He initially kills an innocent family, and attempts to kill Ichirō as well, but only manages to temporarily incapacitate him. Ichirō meets a young friend, Andō Naoyuki who is aware of Hiro's powers and has seen them work. He helps Ichirō understand his powers, and helps him to hone them. Even so, Ichirō is still very amateurish with his abilities.

While initially still working out how to use his powers, Hiro is attacked by police officers and kills a number of them. Following the murder of Shion Watanabe, his girlfriend and the only person left close to him, Hiro goes mad with rage randomly attacking people in Japan, until Ichirō fights and defeats him. Hiro escapes the battle seriously wounded and believed to be destroyed. He reappears at Andō's house, waiting in his room. Andō admits that he is afraid of Hiro, but also that he is still his friend and is happy he is still alive. Embarrassed by his emotional display, Andō turns away to show Hiro a game on his computer, and Hiro silently flies off from the room's balcony while his friend's back is turned.

== Cast ==
- Noritake Kinashi as Ichirō Inuyashiki (犬屋敷 壱郎 Inuyashiki Ichirō)
- Takeru Satoh as Hiro Shishigami (獅子神 皓 Shishigami Hiro)
- Kanata Hongō as Naoyuki Andō (安堂 直行 Andō Naoyuki)
- Ayaka Miyoshi as Mari Inuyashiki (犬屋敷 麻理 Inuyashiki Mari)
- Fumi Nikaidō as Shion Watanabe (渡辺 しおん Watanabe Shion)
- Yuki Saitō as Yuko Shishigami
- Yūsuke Iseya
- Mari Hamada

== Release ==
The film premiered on April 20, 2018 in Japanese theaters. It was also screened in Singapore on May 24 and in Malaysia on July 12, 2018.

== Reception ==
=== Box-office ===
The film ranked at #5 at the box-office in its opening weekend. It sold 91,000 tickets to earn 124 million yen (about US$1.14 million). As of May 6, the film has earned a total of 605,686,900 yen (about US$5.63 million).

=== Critical response ===
Inuyashiki holds a 100% on Rotten Tomatoes, based on 5 critics. Maggie Lee from Variety praised the film and described it as "While the action design and visual effects don’t compare to Hollywood superhero movies, they are solid by local standards. The peppy score and sound mix offer an appropriate level of thrill without turning bombastic. Meanwhile, in a country with the world’s highest elderly population, the action movie’s anti-ageist thrust — demonstrating how undervalued senior citizens kick ass — proves unexpectedly heart-warming".

Mark Schilling from The Japan Times praised the film and gave it 3 out of 5 stars, and described it as "The schoolboy and the salaryman will battle on in two sequels, both already set for future release. But how will writers top the titanic life-or-death struggles of this first installment? Perhaps the way Hollywood would: Cyborgs in space". Manfred Selzer from Asian Movie Web also praised it and gave it a 6 out of 8, and describes it as "Eventually, there is a big showdown, and it is truly a lot more spectacular than we would have expected. While we were already amazed by the special effects at the beginning, they become a lot more bombastic towards the end, even if you can't expect the level of a Marvel-movie here. At the same time, the movie does not just go up in smoke like most Hollywood productions, instead it holds onto the emotional basis of the story. Towards the end, the focus also shifts back to the family-father, and we get a well-done".

== Accolades ==
=== Accolades ===
Inuyashiki won the Excellence Award in the Live-Action Theatrical Film category, and was nominated for the Best Award category in the VFX-Japan Awards 2019. The film was also awarded winner of the Golden Raven Award, Grand Prix of the International Competition at the 36th Brussels International Fantastic Film Festival.

Award nominations for Inuyashiki
Year	Award	Category	Recipient	Result
2018	Best Special Effects	Sitges - Catalonian International Film Festival	Atsushi Doi	Won
2018	Best Film	Sitges - Catalonian International Film Festival	Shinsuke Sato	Nominated
2019	Best Film	Nippon Connection Japanese Film Festival	Shinsuke Sato	Nominated
