= Christopher Ayres =

American actor (1965–2021)

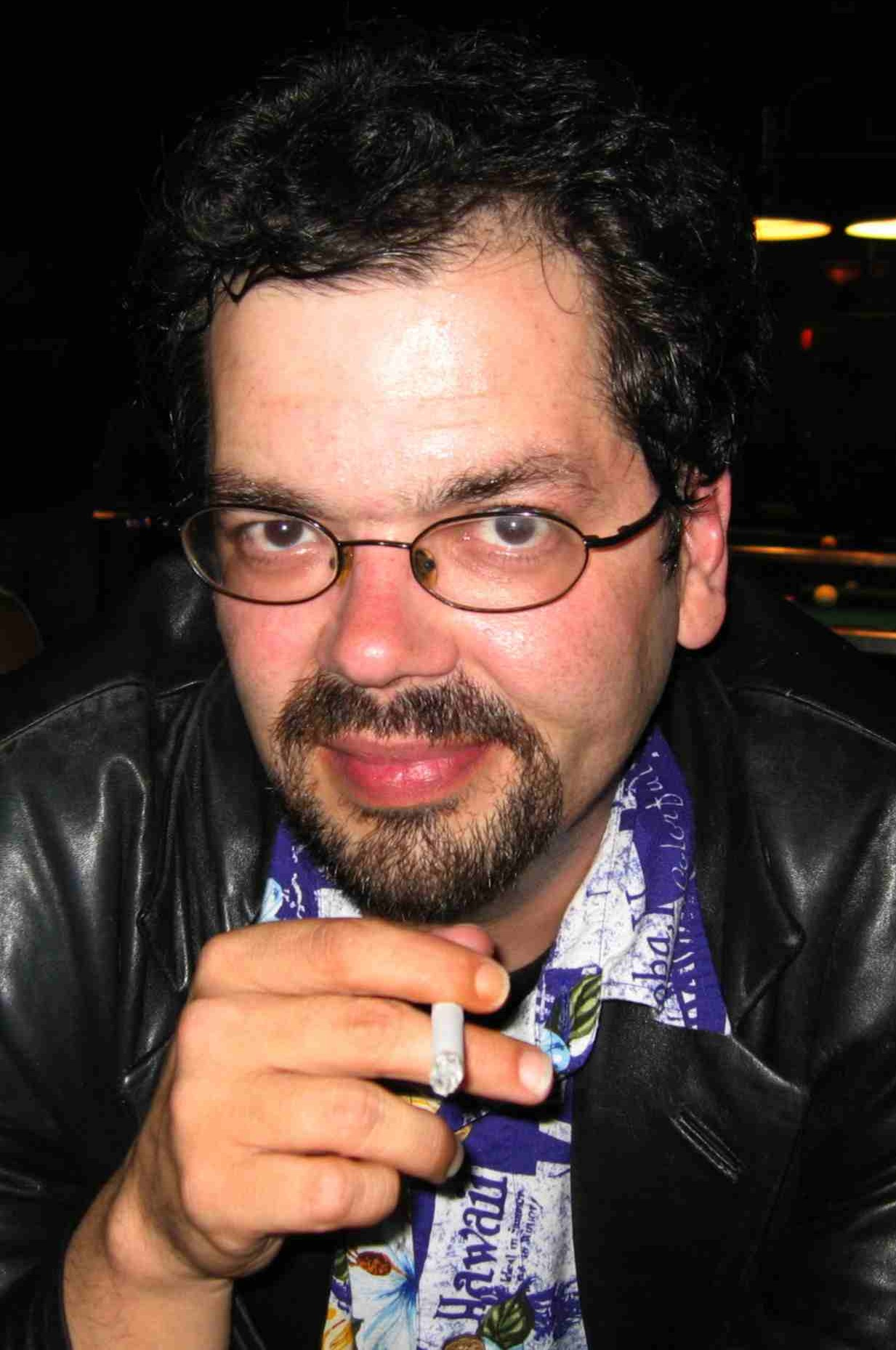
- Ayres in 2006
- Born: Christopher Owen Ayres; May 16, 1965; Richmond, Virginia, U.S.
- Died: October 18, 2021 (aged 56); Houston, Texas, U.S.
- Occupations: Actor; director; scriptwriter
- Years active: 1989–2021
- Partner: Krystal LaPorte
- Family: Greg Ayres (brother)

Christopher Owen Ayres (May 16, 1965 – October 18, 2021) was an American actor, director and scriptwriter. He worked on voice acting and ADR directing on a number of English dubs of Japanese anime shows. In anime, he was best known as the voice of Kei Kurono from Gantz, Frieza from Dragon Ball Z Kai and Dragon Ball Super, Prince Soma from Black Butler, and Shingen Takeda from the Sengoku Basara series. He was also known for Mock Combat for Cosplay panels at anime conventions.

== Early life and career ==
Ayres was born in Richmond, Virginia on May 16, 1965. He had his first professional acting gig in a commercial for Lollipop Soft Drinks in Richmond, Virginia, when he was six years old. The Ayres family moved to the Alief, Houston, area of Houston, Texas, when he was 12, where Chris attended Alief Middle School, and then Alief Elsik High School. He graduated in 1983. After graduating high school Ayres attended Lon Morris College in Jacksonville, Texas, and studied theatre until 1985. He returned to Houston and continued to study theatre at the University of Houston. Prior to his voice acting and ADR directing career, he was well known as a stage director, choreographer, and fight director in the Houston Theatre community.

== Personal life and death ==
In November 2017, Ayres was diagnosed with end-stage chronic obstructive pulmonary disease and required a double lung transplant to survive. A YouCaring fundraiser was created that sought $25,000 to assist with medical care and procedures.

Ayres died on October 18, 2021, at the age of 56, following years of complications from pulmonary disease. His death was announced on Twitter the following day by his partner and fellow voice actress, Krystal LaPorte.

== Filmography ==
=== Anime ===
List of voice performances in animation
Year	Title	Role	Notes	Ref.
2003	Saint Seiya	Ushio	ADV dub	
2004	Kino's Journey	Bartender		
2004	Bast of Syndrome	Dr. Pluto		
2004	Mezzo DSA	Motoharu, Taneri, Baba, Hanamura		
2004	Sister Princess	Islander		
2005	A Tree of Palme	Sawadust		
2005	Full Metal Panic? Fumoffu	Atsunobu Hayashimizu		
2005	Gantz	Kei Kurono		
2005	Godannar	Tetsuya Kouji		
2005	Initial D	Miki	Funimation dub	
2005	Maburaho	Yukihiko Nakamaru		
2005	Yugo the Negotiator	Yusef Ali Mesa		
2006	Diamond Daydreams	Kenji Kurata		
2006	Macross	Lin Kaifun	ADV dub	
2006	Nanaka 6/17	Jinpachi Arashiyama		
2006	Papuwa	Oshodani		
2006	Speed Grapher	Suitengu		
2006	Nerima Daikon Brothers		ADR director	
2008–2009	Mermaid Melody Pichi Pichi Pitch		ADR director unreleased English Dub	
2009	Fairy Tail	Duke Everlue		
2010	Sengoku Basara	Shigen Takeda		
2010	Black Butler	Soma Asman Kadar		
2010	Dragon Ball Z Kai	Frieza		
2010	Golgo 13	Dave McCartney		
2010	Legends of the Dark King: A Fist of the North Star Story	Elder		
2010	Tears to Tiara	Arthur, Pwyll		
2010	Panty & Stocking with Garterbelt	Corset		
2011	Clannad After Story	Sudou, Kinoshita, various characters		
2013	Another	Yosuke Sakakibara		
2013	Kokoro Connect	Inari's brother		
2016	Hanayamata	Additional voices	ADR director	
2017–2019	Dragon Ball Super	Frieza		

=== Films ===
List of voice performances in feature, direct-to-video and television films
Year	Series	Role	Notes	Ref.
2011	Mardock Scramble: The First Compression	Welldone the Pussyhand		
2012	Gintama: The Movie	Kamui, Taizo Hasegawa, Tatsuma Sakamoto, Ner		
2012	Sengoku Basara: The Last Party	Shingen Takeda		
2015	Dragon Ball Z: Resurrection 'F'	Frieza		
2018	Dragon Ball Super: Broly	Frieza	Final film role	
2021	The Dog Park: Prank Calls	Caller #1	Short; Final role	

=== Video games ===
List of voice performances in video games
Year	Title	Role	Notes	Ref.
2008	The Last Remnant	Wagram		
2010–2018	Dragon Ball series	Frieza		

== Theater credits ==
List of acting and directing credits in the theater
Year	Title	Role	Notes	Ref.
1989–1991	Peter Pan	Slightly, John Darling (understudy)	Tour	
1990–1991	Peter Pan	Slightly, John Darling (understudy)	Broadway - Lunt-Fontanne Theatre	
1991–1992	Peter Pan	Slightly, John Darling (understudy)	Broadway - Minskoff Theatre	
1999	The Best Little Whorehouse in Texas		Director and Choreographer Country Playhouse, Houston, TX	
1999	The All Night Strut A review of 30's and 40's music		Director Country Playhouse, Houston, TX	
2000	Gypsy		Choreographer Country Playhouse, Houston, TX	
2000	And the World Goes 'Round		Director Country Playhouse, Houston, TX	
2001	Hair		Director and Choreographer Country Playhouse, Houston, TX	
2001	Man of La Mancha		Director and Choreographer Country Playhouse, Houston, TX	
2002	Cabaret		Director and Choreographer Country Playhouse, Houston, TX	
2003	A Funny Thing Happened on the Way to the Forum		Director and Choreographer Country Playhouse, Houston, TX	
2004	Romeo and Juliet		Fight Choreographer Country Playhouse, Houston, TX	
2004	The Pirates of Penzance		Director and Choreographer Country Playhouse, Houston, TX	
2005	Noises Off		Director Country Playhouse, Houston, TX	
2005	The Rocky Horror Show		Director, Choreographer and Fight Choreographer Playhouse 90, Rosenberg, TX	
2005	You're a Good Man, Charlie Brown		Director and Choreographer Playhouse 90, Rosenberg, TX	
