= Gantz: O =

- Theatrical release poster
- Directed by: Keiichi Sato (chief); Yasushi Kawamura
- Screenplay by: Tsutomu Kuroiwa
- Based on: Gantz by Hiroya Oku
- Starring: Daisuke Ono; Mao Ichimichi; Tomohiro Kaku; Saori Hayami; Shūichi Ikeda; Masane Tsukayama; Yūki Kaji
- Music by: Yoshihiro Ike
- Production company: Digital Frontier
- Distributed by: Toho
- Release dates: September 8, 2016 (Venice); October 14, 2016 (Japan)
- Running time: 96 minutes
- Country: Japan
- Language: Japanese
- Box office: US$2.2 million (¥246 million)

Gantz: O (styled as GANTZ:O) is a 2016 adult Japanese animated science fiction action film directed by Yasushi Kawamura and Keiichi Sato (chief), written by Tsutomu Kuroiwa, animated by Digital Frontier, and based on the manga series Gantz, which was written and illustrated by Hiroya Oku.

Following its premiere at the 73rd Venice International Film Festival on September 8, 2016, Gantz: O was released in Japan on October 14 by Toho.

== Plot ==
While fighting invading monsters, Kei Kurono rescues his friend, Reika. Though she protests, he attacks the monsters' leader, dying after killing it. Reika and her surviving teammates are teleported back to their base. Elsewhere, Masaru Kato dies attempting to save someone from a knife attack in a subway. He wakes up in a room with Reika and her teammates: Yoshikazu Suzuki, an old man; Joichiro Nishi, a surly teenager; and an angry, unidentified man. Suzuki explains that they have each died and woken in the room, and have been forced to fight against waves of monsters ever since. Before Suzuki can explain further, a black orb identified as "Gantz" announces that their next mission is about to begin. The angry man refuses to participate and is killed by Nishi, who reasons that he would have been a liability.

After putting on skintight suits containing advanced technology, the group is teleported to Osaka. When Kato presses for answers, Nishi threatens to kill him. Suzuki quickly explains the "game": the team is given two hours to kill every monster in the city; if they fail, the team members die. After Kato and his team meet the Osaka team, some of whom have exotic weapons, Suzuki tells him that players acquire points for killing monsters. Anyone who scores 100 points can choose from three bonuses: upgraded weaponry, resurrection of a fallen teammate, or freedom from the "game".

Nishi turns invisible to stealthily wait for high point monsters. The others watch as the better-equipped Osaka team easily slaughters monsters. Reika and Suzuki urge Kato to not engage the monsters needlessly, but he insists that they rescue the city's citizens. They refuse, saying they are too weak.

Anzu Yamasaki, a member of the Osaka team, follows Kato, trying to figure out his motivation. Kato says he is a student who has been living alone with his younger brother since the death of their parents. Yamasaki reveals that she has a young son and says they have something in common: both must stay alive to help someone who depends on them. Although Yamasaki initially believes that Kato is showing off, she eventually concludes that he genuinely wants to help others and joins him in killing a monster that was menacing civilians.

A gigantic monster rises from the water, and an equally large mecha appears, piloted by seven-time winner Hachiro Oka. Oka kills the monster but loses his mecha. In the meantime, another monster kills the two most competent players on the Osaka team.

Oka, wounded and weaponless, engages the lead monster, who appears in a series of increasingly deadly forms. Oka appears to win but tells the team it is not dead; it must be taken by surprise to be truly killed. After rising, the demon easily defeats the remaining players. Suzuki is heavily wounded after sacrificing himself to save Kato, and Nishi's arm is ripped off. Instead of killing them, it goes after Oka, who has left to retrieve better weapons.

Knowing someone must defeat the demon and Oka may be too wounded, Kato decides to act as a decoy while Reika and Yamasaki snipe the monster. Before the plan begins, Yamasaki proposes that, if she and Kato survive, they begin living together with her son and Kato's brother. Although surprised, Kato agrees, and they take their positions.

The demon, having killed Oka, attacks Kato, and the others shoot it from a distance. Before dying, the demon kills Yamasaki and maims Kato. Kato collapses beside Yamasaki's body, and the others assume him dead. Reika, Suzuki, and Nishi are surprised when he rejoins them at the base, where all are fully healed. When the scores are tallied up, Kato has 100 points; Reika and Suzuki encourage him to choose his freedom, but he resurrects Yamasaki. After Gantz allows them to leave, Kato races to his brother. The others reveal that this is Kato's second time in Gantz' game: after winning a previous game, he was granted his freedom and had his memories wiped. Although they do not know how he returned, they state that his self-sacrificing nature remains the same.

== Cast ==
Characters	Japanese	English
Masaru Kato	Daisuke Ono	Kaiji Tang
Anzu Yamasaki	Mao Ichimichi	Cristina Vee
Joichiro Nishi	Tomohiro Kaku	Kyle McCarley
Reika Shimohira	Saori Hayami	Laura Post
Yoshikazu Suzuki	Shuuichi Ikeda	Todd Haberkorn
Nurarihyon	Masane Tsukayama	Josiah Wills
Susumu Kimura	Masaya Onosaka	Bryce Papenbrook
Sanpei Taira	Kenjiro Tsuda	Tony Azzolino
Tetsuo Hara	Teruaki Ogawa	
Kei Kurono	Yūki Kaji	Lucien Dodge
Ayumu Kato	Rihito Morio	Austin Chase
Hachiro Oka	Kendo Kobayashi	Doug Erholtz
George Shimaki	Masaki Sumitani	Steve Heiser
Nobuo Muroya	Makoto Izubuchi	Keith Silverstein
Gantz Ball	SofTalk	Cherami Leigh

== Production ==
On November 17, 2015, the film was originally announced in the December issue of Miracle Jump as an untitled, "full 3DCG" Gantz anime film. On April 18, 2016, the title of the movie was revealed to be Gantz: O and would be based on the Osaka arc of the original manga. Several trailers were released for the film throughout the year, featuring music from the Japanese band, The Dresscodes.

On August 3, 2016, Hiroya Oku discussed the creation of the film at an event, "GANTZ: O NIGHT ~ @hiroya_oku SHIBUYA Mission ~," alongside director Yasushi Kawamura, motion capture performer Asami Katsura, and a replica of the Gantz orb. Oku stated in regards to the creation of the film that while he has liked previous 3DCG films, he was left dissatisfied with parts of them, but was surprised that Gantz: O met his ideals despite fears he had.

== Release ==
Gantz: O was first screened on September 8, 2016, at the 73rd Venice International Film Festival. It was released in Japan by Toho on October 14, 2016. The Blu-ray was released on February 22, 2017.

The film had its English language debut at the Tokyo International Film Festival on November 19, 2016. A separate English dub became available to stream on Netflix on February 18, 2017.

== Reception ==
=== Box office ===
The film opened across 153 locations and ranked at #6 at the Japanese box office in its opening weekend. As of October 30, 2016, the film has grossed a total of over ¥246 million.

=== Accolades ===
Year	Award ceremony	Category	Result
2017	71st Mainichi Film Awards	Best Animation Film	Nominated
2017	VFX-JAPAN Awards	Excellence Animated Film Award	Won
