= Thunder 3 (manga) =

Japanese manga series

- First tankōbon volume cover, featuring (from left to right) Tsubame Azuma, Pyontaro Tezuka, and Hiroshi Ochanomizu

サンダー3 (Sandā Surī)
- Genre: Isekai; Mystery; Science fantasy
- Manga
- Written by: Yuki Ikeda
- Published by: Kodansha
- English publisher: NA: Kodansha USA
- Imprint: Monthly Shōnen Magazine Comics
- Magazine: Monthly Shōnen Magazine
- Original run: May 6, 2022 – June 5, 2026
- Volumes: 10
- Anime television series
- Directed by: Hiroyuki Seshita (chief); Keisuke Ide
- Written by: Hiroshi Seko
- Music by: Frédéric Chateau; Akiyuki Tateyama
- Studio: Unend
- Licensed by: Netflix (streaming rights)
- Original network: Fuji TV (+Ultra); Kansai TV, Animax, THK, BS Fuji, uhb, TNC, FTV
- Original run: July 9, 2026 – present
- Episodes: 12
- icon

Thunder 3 (Japanese: サンダー3, Hepburn: Sandā Surī) is a Japanese manga series written and illustrated by Hiroya Oku under the pen name Yuki Ikeda. It was serialized in Kodansha's shōnen manga magazine Monthly Shōnen Magazine from May 2022 to June 2026, with its chapters collected in ten tankōbon volumes. An anime television series adaptation produced by Unend aired its first season from July to October 2026. A second season is set to premiere in 2027.

== Plot ==
The "Small Three"—ordinary middle school students Pyontaro Tezuka, Hiroshi Ochanomizu, and Tsubame Azuma—accidentally discover a parallel world after playing a mysterious disc borrowed from their teacher, Doc. When a lifelike dragonfly emerges from their television screen, Pyontaro's younger sister, Futaba, and their pet dog chase after it, only to be pulled into the parallel world and captured by its alien inhabitants. The story follows the Small Three as they join forces with the humans of the parallel world to rescue Futaba and confront the extraterrestrial threats.

== Characters ==
Pyontaro Tezuka (手塚 ぴょんたろう, Tezuka Pyontarō)
Voiced by: Sayumi Suzushiro (Japanese); Abby Trott (English)
Hiroshi Ochanomizu (お茶の水 ひろし, Ochanomizu Hiroshi)
Voiced by: Eri Akiyama (Japanese); Ryan Bartley (English)
Tsubame Azuma (吾妻 つばめ, Azuma Tsubame)
Voiced by: Natsumi Kawaida (Japanese); Brenna Larsen (English)
Futaba Tezuka (手塚 ふたば, Tezuka Futaba)
Voiced by: Honoka Mitsubachi (Japanese); Risa Mei (English)
Doc (ドク, Doku)
Voiced by: Shogo Sakata (Japanese); Damien Haas (English)
Teiichi Segami (瀬上 貞一, Segami Teiichi)
Voiced by: Taito Ban (Japanese); Cory Yee^{Ep. 4 credits} (English)
Suzuka Tashiro (田代 涼花, Tashiro Suzuka)
Voiced by: Yuuki Hirose (Japanese); Alejandra Reynoso^{Ep. 5 credits} (English)
Mio Kisaragi (如月 澪, Kisaragi Mio)
Voiced by: Ryōko Maekawa (Japanese); Triya Leong^{Ep. 4 credits} (English)
Kyōji "Genius" Sumeragi (皇 恭治, Sumeragi Kyōji)
Voiced by: Haruki Ishiya (Japanese); Nathan Wagner^{Ep. 6 credits} (English)
Yutaka Yamamoto (山本 豊, Yamamoto Yutaka)
Voiced by: Yuki Onodera (Japanese); Blythe Melin^{Ep. 4 credits} (English)
Sameyama (鮫岾)
Voiced by: Yuuki Shin (Japanese); Adin Rudd^{Ep. 5 credits} (English)
Sydney (シドニー, Shidonī)
Voiced by: Miho Wataya (Japanese); Lauren Landa^{Ep. 9 credits} (English)

== Media ==
=== Manga ===
Written and illustrated by Hiroya Oku, under the pen name Yuki Ikeda, Thunder 3 was serialized in Kodansha's shōnen manga magazine Monthly Shōnen Magazine from May 6, 2022, to June 5, 2026. On September 24, 2026, Oku stated on his X account that he wrote the series under a pen name because he felt the plot twist in the first chapter would have lost its impact if his real name had been used, and he wanted to surprise first-time readers. Kodansha collected its chapters in ten tankōbon volumes, released from October 17, 2022, to August 17, 2026.

In March 2024, Kodansha USA announced that they had licensed the manga for print release, with the first volume published on November 5 of that same year.

==== Volumes ====
No.	Original release date	Original ISBN	English release date	English ISBN
1	October 17, 2022	978-4-06-528928-0	November 5, 2024	978-1-64-729400-7
1. "The Small Three" (Note: "SMALL3" in the original Japanese release); 2. "Multiverse"; 3. "Aliens"; 4. "Face to Face"
2	January 17, 2023	978-4-06-530372-6	January 7, 2025	978-1-64-729386-4
5. "Heroes"; 6. "Segami" (Note: "MR.SEGAMI" in the original Japanese release); 7. "Rebellion"; 8. "Dogfight"
3	May 17, 2023	978-4-06-531830-0	March 4, 2025	978-1-64-729443-4
9. "Segami's Decision" (Note: "DETERMINATION" in the original Japanese release); 10. "Game On!"; 11. "Outbreak"; 12. "Close Combat"
4	September 14, 2023	978-4-06-533413-3	May 6, 2025	978-1-64-729444-1
13. "Melee" (Note: "A MELEE" in the original Japanese release); 14. "Interlopers" (Note: "THE STRANGERS" in the original Japanese release); 15. "Counterattack"; 16. "Warriors" (Note: "THE STRONG MEN" in the original Japanese release)
5	December 15, 2023	978-4-06-534207-7	July 1, 2025	978-1-64-729445-8
17. "Time's Up" (Note: "TIME IS UP" in the original Japanese release); 18. "The Small Three vs. the Aliens" (Note: "SMALL3 VS. ALIENS" in the original Japanese release); 19. "We Are the Thunder Three!!" (Note: "WE ARE 『THUNDER 3』!!" in the original Japanese release); 20. "Reunited" (Note: "REUNITE" in the original Japanese release)
6	May 16, 2024	978-4-06-535623-4	September 9, 2025	978-1-64-729463-2
21. "Final Attack"; 22. "After the Battle"; 23. "Foreboding"; 24. "The Calm Before the Storm"
7	September 17, 2024	978-4-06-536886-2	November 4, 2025	978-1-64-729491-5
25. "And Then There Were None"; 26. "Battle on the Ship" (Note: "BATTLE IN THE SHIP" in the original Japanese release); 27. "Selfless Dedication" (Note: "PRECIOUS DEDICATION" in the original Japanese release); 28. "New Heroes"
8	January 17, 2025	978-4-06-537932-5	February 10, 2026	978-1-64-729573-8
29. "Human vs. Alien"; 30. "Get Closer"; 31. "Fight Together"; 32. "Whiteout"
9	July 16, 2026	978-4-06-543913-5	—	—
33. "The Will"; 34. "The Guardian"; 35. "Too Heavy Odds"; 36. "How Can We Win?"
10	August 17, 2026	978-4-06-544287-6	—	—
37. "Aaaaaaaaah!!"; 38. "Return of the Heroes"; 39. "Thunder 3" (サンダー3, Sandā Surī)

=== Anime ===
In February 2026, it was announced that the series would receive an anime television series adaptation. It is produced by Unend and directed by Keisuke Ide, with Hiroyuki Seshita serving as chief director, Hiroshi Seko handling the series composition and screenplays, Junko Yamanaka and Yūki Moriyama designing the characters (with Naoyuki Onda credited for original character design concepts), and Frédéric Chateau and Akiyuki Tateyama composing the music. The series aired from July 9 to October 1, 2026, on Fuji TV's +Ultra programming block. (Note: Fuji TV listed the series premiere on July 8 at 24:45, which is effectively July 9 at 12:45 a.m. JST.) The opening theme song is "Thunderbolt" (サンダーボルト, Sandāboruto), performed by Yuuri, while the ending theme song is "Shururerira" (しゅるれりら), performed by Otoha.

A second season was announced after the first season's finale. It is set to premiere in 2027.

Netflix is streaming the series worldwide.

==== Episodes ====
No.	Title	Directed by (Note: Production staff information is taken from the ending credits of each episode.)	Written by	Storyboarded by	Animation directed by	Original release date
1	"Small Three"	Unknown	Unknown	TBA	TBA	July 9, 2026
2	"Multiverse"	Unknown	Unknown	TBA	TBA	July 16, 2026
3	"Aliens"	Unknown	Unknown	TBA	TBA	July 23, 2026
4	"Mr. Segami"	Unknown	Unknown	TBA	TBA	July 30, 2026
5	"Rebellion"	Unknown	Unknown	TBA	TBA	August 6, 2026
6	"Game On"	Unknown	Unknown	TBA	TBA	August 13, 2026
7	"Counterattack"	Unknown	Unknown	TBA	TBA	August 20, 2026
8	"The Strangers"	Unknown	Unknown	TBA	TBA	August 27, 2026
9	"The Strong Men"	Unknown	Unknown	TBA	TBA	September 2, 2026
10	"Time is Up"	Unknown	Unknown	TBA	TBA	September 9, 2026
11	"We Are "Thunder 3""	Unknown	Unknown	TBA	TBA	September 16, 2026
12	"Final Attack"	Unknown	Unknown	TBA	TBA	October 1, 2026

== Reception ==
The series was nominated for the 2022 Next Manga Award in the print manga category. It was nominated for the eBook Initiative Japan Manga Award 2023. It ranked fourth on Takarajimasha's Kono Manga ga Sugoi! list of best manga of 2024 for male readers.

Writing for the Real Sound, Reiichi Narima praised the series for its premise and realistic and detailed artwork, comparing it to Oku's Gantz and Inio Asano's Dead Dead Demon's Dededede Destruction. Mei Chan from the same website included the series on her top 10 manga series of 2022, calling it "definitely the most shocking and surprising work of the year."
