= Okusama wa 18-sai =

Japanese manga by Miyoko Motomura

おくさまは18歳
- Manga
- Written by: Miyoko Motomura
- Published by: Shueisha
- Magazine: Margaret
- Original run: 1969 – 1970
- Television drama
- Original network: TBS
- Original run: September 29, 1970 – September 28, 1971
- Episodes: 53
- Television drama
- Original network: Fuji TV TWO
- Original run: March 27, 2011 – present
- Episodes: 4

Okusama wa 18-sai (おくさまは18歳; lit. "My Wife Is 18 Years Old") is a Japanese manga by Miyoko Motomura. It was published in Shueisha's Weekly Margaret from August 1969 to August 1970. It was adapted into television dramas in 1970 and 2011; there was also a film adaptation in 1971.

== Synopsis ==
At American college Sweet Pea Gakuen, a young teacher, Ricky Nelson, and a female student, Linda Nelson, live a school life while hiding their marriage.

== Media ==
=== Manga ===
Written by Miyoko Motomura, it was published in Shueisha's Weekly Margaret from August 1969 to August 1970.

=== Television series ===
==== 1970 ====
A television adaptation starring Yuki Okazaki as Asuka Takagi and Tetsuo Ishidate as Tetsuya Takagi aired from September 29, 1970, to September 28, 1971.

==== 2011 ====
A remake version starring Takanori Nishikawa and Natsuna Watanabe was broadcast from March 27, 2011. In this version, Hokushin Gakuen, where Tetsuya works as a temporary teacher, merges with the girls' high school Asuka attends due to financial reasons caused by the declining birth rate.

=== Film ===
Following the success of the 1970 television series, a film adaptation was made in 1971. Due to financial difficulties faced by Daiei Film, Toho took over production. Thus, other than the main characters, the staff and cast were changed.
