= Gantz: G =

Japanese manga series

- Cover of the first volume
- Genre: Science fiction
- Created by: Hiroya Oku
- Manga
- Written by: Hiroya Oku (vol. 1); Tomohito Ohsaki (vol. 2 & 3)
- Illustrated by: Keita Iizuka
- Published by: Shueisha
- English publisher: NA: Dark Horse Comics
- Imprint: Young Jump Comics
- Magazine: Miracle Jump; Shōnen Jump+ (final chapter)
- Original run: November 17, 2015 – March 17, 2017
- Volumes: 3
- icon

Gantz: G (stylized as GANTZ:G) is a Japanese manga series written by Hiroya Oku and Tomohito Ohsaki and illustrated by Keita Iizuka. It is a spin-off to Oku's Gantz manga series. Gantz: G was serialized in Shueisha's seinen manga magazine Miracle Jump from November 2015 to February 2017, while its final chapter was published on the Shōnen Jump+ online platform. Its chapters were collected in three tankōbon volumes.

== Plot ==
A group of high school students, led by Kei Kurona, die in a bus accident on their way to a school trip. They suddenly awaken inside an abandoned school building, where they encounter a mysterious black sphere known as Gantz, along with two experienced participants, Fujimoto and Abiko. They explain that they have been brought back to life to participate in a series of deadly missions. The group is forced to wear specialized suits and hunt extraterrestrial targets, with the promise that earning 100 points will grant them freedom, while death in the game results in their death in reality.

During their first mission, the students are transported to a zoo and ordered to eliminate a target. Most of them ignore the warnings and are quickly killed, leaving only Kei Kurona, Yoshiko Miyazaki, Kimiko Ikegami, Ai Morishita, and Meiko Kaji. After returning to their normal lives, the survivors train under Fujimoto and Abiko to prepare for future missions.

In a subsequent mission at an aquarium, the group face a powerful alien that can spawn numerous creatures. Both Fujimoto and Abiko are killed during the battle, forcing the remaining students to fight on their own. Kei devises a strategy to restrain the alien while the others attack, leading to its defeat. After the mission, Ikegami uses the 100-point reward system to resurrect a fallen participant, and the survivors continue their lives while preparing for the next summons, eventually taking on the role of guiding new players in the deadly game.

== Publication ==
Written by Hiroya Oku (ch. 1–6, vol. 1) and Tomohito Ohsaki (ch. 7–18, vol. 2 and 3) and illustrated by Keita Iizuka, Gantz: G was serialized in Shueisha's seinen manga magazine Miracle Jump from November 17, 2015, to February 28, 2017. Miracle Jump halted its publication and the last chapter of the series was published on the Shōnen Jump+ online platform. Shueisha collected its chapters in three tankōbon volumes, released from September 16, 2016, to March 17, 2017.

In North America, the manga was licensed for English release by Dark Horse Comics. The three volumes were released between June 13, 2018, and February 27, 2019. An omnibus edition is set to be released by the company on September 30, 2025.

=== Volumes ===
No.	Original release date	Original ISBN	English release date	English ISBN
1	September 16, 2016	978-4-08-890395-8	June 13, 2018	978-1-5067-0777-8
2	October 19, 2016	978-4-08-890513-6	October 10, 2018	978-1-5067-0778-5
3	March 17, 2017	978-4-08-890609-6	February 27, 2019	978-1-5067-0779-2

== Reception ==
The first volume of Gantz: G sold 22,273 copies in its first week; the second volume sold 28,602 copies in its first week; the third and final volume sold 20,760 copies in its first week.
