= Natsuna Watanabe =

Japanese actress (born 1989)

Natsuna
- 夏菜
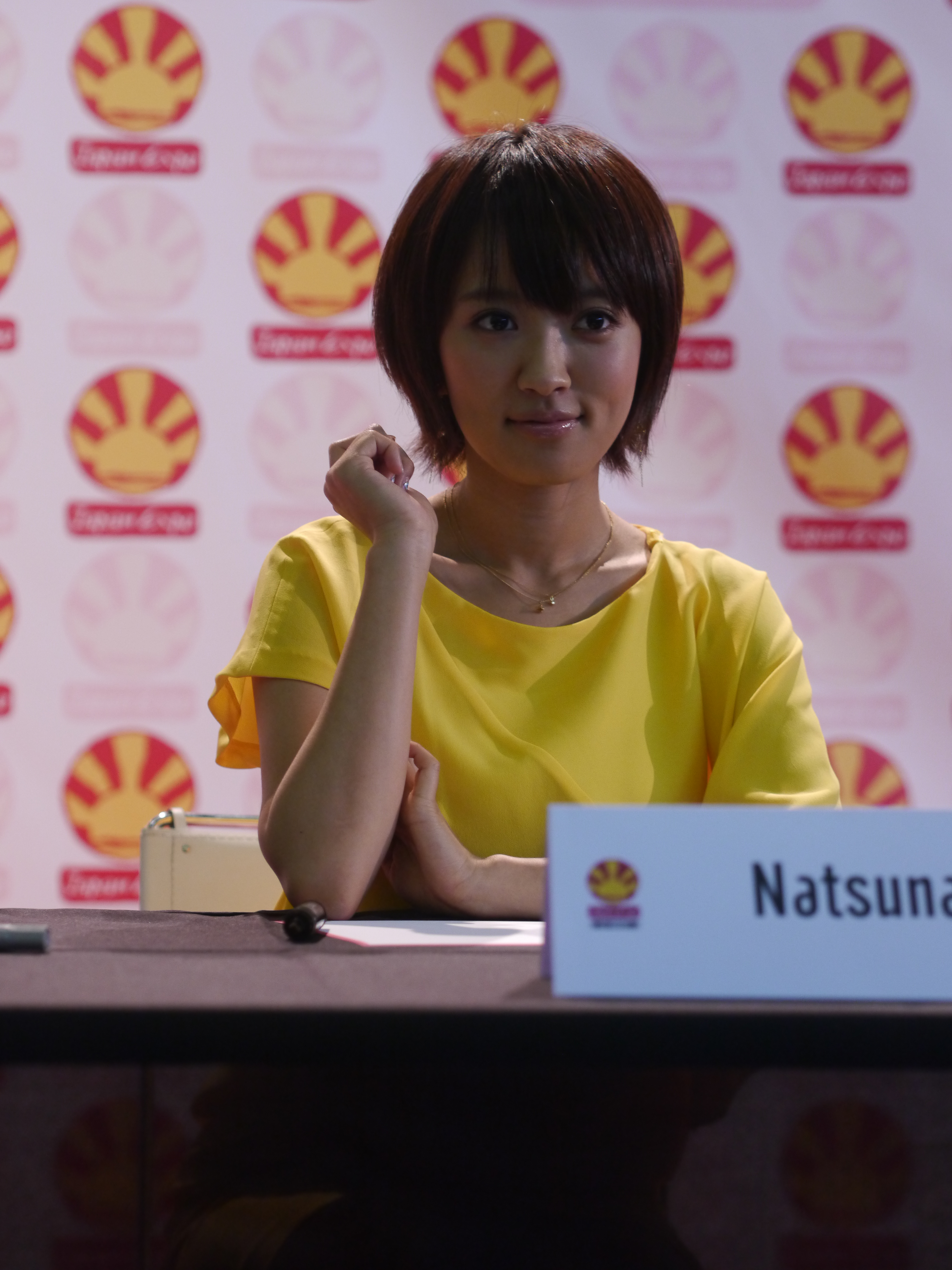
- Natsuna at the Japan Expo in Paris (2013)
- Born: Natsuna Watanabe; May 23, 1989 (age 37); Saitama Prefecture, Japan
- Occupation: Actress
- Years active: 2006–present
- Agent: Toyota Office
- Known for: Gantz series; Jun to Ai
- Spouse: Unknown (m. 2021)
- Children: 2
- Website: www.toyotaoffice.jp

Natsuna Watanabe (渡辺 夏菜, Watanabe Natsuna; born May 23, 1989), better known as just Natsuna (夏菜, Natsuna), is a Japanese actress.

She was born in Saitama Prefecture. When she graduated from high-school she decided to focus her career entirely on acting. As of 2009, she shortened her stage name and is now simply going by "Natsuna" (夏菜). In 2012, she landed the coveted lead role in the NHK Asadora Jun to Ai after an audition of over 2250 actors.

== Appearances ==
=== TV dramas ===
- Gachi Baka (TBS, 2006), Hikari Seike
- Kiraware Matsuko no Issho ("Life of Despised Matsuko") (TBS, 2006), Kumi Kawajiri
- Erai Tokoroni Totsuide Shimatta (TV Asahi, 2007), Nao Yamamoto
- Kodoku no Kake: Itoshiki Hitoyo (TBS, 2007), Mika Inui
- Mop Girl (TV Asahi, 2007), Tamaki Nakamura
- Ando Natsu (TBS, 2008), Miyo
- Daimajin Kanon ("Great Angry God Sound of Flowers") (TV Tokyo, 2010), Saki Uehara
- Quartet (MBS, 2011), Kasumi
- Okusama wa 18-sai ("My Wife Is 18 Years Old") (Fuji TV Two, 2011), Asuka Takagi
- Another Gantz (NTV, 2011), Kei Kishimoto
- Shima Shima (TBS, 2011), Yumi Tachibana
- Ore no Sora: Keijihen (TV Asahi, 2011), Hitomi Misaki
- Miyuki Miyabe 4-shū Renzoku Mystery "Snark Gari" (TBS, 2012), Noriko Kokubun
- Jun to Ai (NHK, 2012), Jun Machida
- Doubles: Futari no Keiji (TV Asahi, 2013), Aki Miyata
- Jun to Ai Special: Fujiko no Kareina Ichinichi (NHK BS Premium, 2013), Jun Machida
- Jinsei ga Tokimeku Katazuke no Mahou (NTV, 2013), Kaoru Futagotamagawa
- Yonimo Kimyōna Monogatari: '13 Aki no Tokubetsu Hen "0.03 Frame no Onna" (Fuji TV, 2013)
- Kamen Teacher (NTV, 2014), Maya Gatō
- Gokuaku Ganbo Episode 1 (Fuji TV, 2014), Satomi Yashiki
- Last Doctor: Kansatsui Akita no Kenshi Houkoku Episode 1 (TV Tokyo, 2014), Rika Suyama
- Ōedo Sōsamō 2015: Onmitsu Dōshin, Aku o Kiru! (TV Tokyo, 2015), Okichi Shiranui
- Meikyū Sousa (TV Asahi, 2015), Asako Takasu
- Scoop Yūgun Kisha Kyōichi Fuse (TBS, 2015), Eriko Kayama
- Hotel Concierge (TBS, 2015), Arisa Takagaki
- Watashitachi ga Propose Sarenainoniwa, 101 no Riyū ga Atte Dana Season 2 Episode 3 (LaLa TV, 2015), Yuri
- Specialist (TV Asahi, 2016), Maria Azuma

=== TV movies ===
- Miracle Voice (TBS, 2008), Yumi Inagaki
- Ranma ½ (NTV, 2011), Ranma Saotome (female)

=== Films ===
- Kimi ni Todoke ("Reaching You") (2010), Ayane Yano
- Gantz (2011), Kei Kishimoto
- Gantz: Perfect Answer (2011), Kei Kishimoto
- Kankin Tantei ("Confinement Detective") (2013), Akane
- Tigermask (2013), Ruriko Wakatsuki
- Koi to Onchi no Houteishiki ("The Equation of Love and Tone-Deafness") (2014), Midori Yamabuki
- Clover (2014), Shiori Tsutsui
- Nagashiya Teppei ("Teppei the Traveling Musician") (2015), Akemi Shiina
- Kagami no Naka no Egao Tachi ("Smiles in the Mirror") (2015), Mari Takahashi
- Tanuma Ryokan no Kiseki ("The Miracle of Tanuma Ryokan") (2015), Nao Nishikawa
- Fullmetal Alchemist (2017), Maria Ross
- Saki (Good Hope) (2017), Yasuko Fujita
- ReLIFE (2017), Kokoro Amatsu
- Gintama 2 ("Silver Soul") (2018), Ayame Sarutobi
- The Door into Summer (2021), Rin Shiraishi
- 189 (2021)
- Once Upon a Crime (Akazukin, Tabi no Tochū de Shitai to Deau) (2023) – Anne

=== Commercials ===
- Mobit (2011)
- Japan Post Service
  - Nenga Hagaki spokesperson (2011)
  - Youpack spokesperson (2013)
- Unicharm – Sofy (2012)
- Choya Umeshu – Umesshu (2012)
- Daiichi Sankyo Healthcare – Kakonāru 2 (2012)
- Aigan (2013)
- Tsukamoto – Kimono Journal "Ichigo" (2013)

=== Stage ===
- Tokubetuhou Dai 001-jō Dust (New National Theatre Tokyo, January 14, 2009 – January 27, 2009), Mayu Sakurai
- Nurui Doku (Kinokuniya Hall, September 13, 2013 – September 26, 2013), Yuri Kumada

== Personal life ==
Natsuna married her boyfriend on January 16, 2021. She gave birth to her first child, a daughter, on March 1, 2022. Natsuna announced on her instagram that she is pregnant with the couple's second child on March 29, 2023.

== Bibliography ==
=== Photobooks ===
- Natsuna Gantz/K (Shueisha, April 22, 2011), ISBN 9784087806090
- 727_8766 (Tokyo News Service, May 23, 2013), ISBN 9784863363229
- The Gravure (Shueisha, January 27, 2014), ISBN 9784087807110
