= Gantz (film series) =

- Directed by: Shinsuke Sato
- Screenplay by: Yūsuke Watanabe
- Based on: Gantz by Hiroya Oku
- Produced by: Takahiro Sato
- Starring: Kazunari Ninomiya; Ken'ichi Matsuyama; Yuriko Yoshitaka
- Music by: Kenji Kawai
- Distributed by: Toho
- Release dates: January 29, 2011 (Gantz); April 23, 2011 (Gantx: Perfect Answer)
- Running time: 141 minutes
- Country: Japan
- Language: Japanese
- Budget: 2.1 billion yen (total)
- Box office: 7.4 billion yen (total)

Gantz is a Japanese series of live-action action horror science fiction films. The Gantz series is based on Hiroya Oku's manga series, Gantz. The films are titled Gantz, the sequel Gantz: Perfect Answer, and a made-for-TV movie titled Another Gantz.

The first film, starring Kazunari Ninomiya and Kenichi Matsuyama, follows two high school students who die and are transported to an alternate world. In this alternate reality, a black sphere gives them a mission to kill aliens.

== Plot ==
=== Gantz (2011) ===
The film follows two young men, Kei Kurono (Kazunari Ninomiya) and Masaru Kato (Kenichi Matsuyama), who are killed in a train accident. After their deaths they find themselves transported to another world, where there exists a black ball known as Gantz. Inside the Gantz is a bald man on life support. They find the Gantz in an unfurnished Tokyo apartment, and it forces them to take part in missions to hunt down and kill aliens. They struggle to figure out whether it is a game, or reality. Kurono and Kato, and other newly dead people must accumulate points by killing aliens, and when they score one hundred points, they can choose to be resurrected, or bring a person of their choosing back to life.

=== Another Gantz (2011) ===
Airing on TV before Gantz: Perfect Answer, Another Gantz is an alternate version of the first Gantz film. The film follows an investigative journalist leading into the sequel Gantz: Perfect Answer.

=== Gantz: Perfect Answer (2011) ===
In Part two, Kei has become a warrior for Gantz, seeking to earn 100 points. Kei aims to bring Kato back to life, who had died in the world of Gantz. He is working at a fast food restaurant, while taking care of his friend's orphaned little brother. In between missions, Kei lives his old life, and has a relationship with Tae (Yuriko Yoshitaka), an artist. He succeeds in bringing Masaru back to life, but Masaru comes back as two people - one good, and the other one evil. There is also an investigator, Shigeta (Takayuki Yamada), who is trying to understand the Gantz-related violence, and Eriko Ayukawa (Ayumi Ito), an actress who wakes up with a small Gantz ball in her bed. Soon, aliens begin to take on alien form and attack the main characters, and the Gantz ball begins to experience glitches. The fighting culminates in a battle on board a subway with shapeshifting aliens.

== Cast ==
Character	Actor
Kei Kurono	Kazunari Ninomiya
Masaru Kato	Ken'ichi Matsuyama
Tae Kojima	Yuriko Yoshitaka
Jōichirō Nishi	Kanata Hongō
Kei Kishimoto	Natsuna Watanabe
Eriko Ayukawa	Ayumi Ito
Tanaka Seijin	Ainosuke Shibata
Kayo Sugimoto	Chieko Ichikawa
Musō Tokugawa	Donpei Tsuchihira
Green Onion Father	Hidekazu Nagae
Kurofuku #1	Go Ayano
Kiyoshi Hatanaka	Kazuhide Kobayashi
Kenichi Kurono	Kazuyuki Asano
Ayumu Kato	Kensuke Chisaka
Mako Yamamoto	Yurie Midori
Ball Man	Matsuri Hashimoto
Izumi Shiraishi	Merii
Takashi Inamori	Motoki Ochiai
Kōki Takahashi	Ryuuya Wakaba
Shinichi Kobayashi	Masanobu Sakata
Kouta Nakamura	Tomokazu Koshimura
Green Onion Kid (Face)	Shō Igarashi
Green Onion Kid (Body)	Yasutaka Hayakawa
Hiroto Sakurai	Shunya Shiraishi
Ryōta Sugimoto	Shūya Haruna
Masamitsu Shigeta	Takayuki Yamada
Yoshikazu Suzuki	Tomorowo Taguchi
Masashi Yamada	Toshimasa Komatsu
Train Station PA (voice)	Yuki Hamano
Risa Sakano	Yūko Genkaku
Akitoshi Okazaki	Yūsuke Furusawa

== Production and release ==
On November 24, 2009, it was announced that two live-action Gantz films were in production, based on the manga series of the same name. The films star Kazunari Ninomiya and Kenichi Matsuyama in the roles of Kurono and Kato respectively, and were directed by Shinsuke Sato. Both films were released in 2011: the first, Gantz, in January; and the second, Gantz: Perfect Answer, in April. Computer-generated animation (CG) was done by Digital Frontier.

The first film, titled Gantz, was released in Japan on 29 January 2011. A special one-night screening took place in the United States on January 20, 2011, during which the film was simulcast to movie theaters in 46 states; with the film dubbed into English for the event. At the end of the special screening at the Mann's Chinese 6 Theater in Los Angeles, there was a discussion and live interview with both the male leads, as well as a teaser trailer for Gantz: Perfect Answer. The film premiered in the United Kingdom at the Sci-Fi-London Festival on April 26, 2011 at the Apollo Theatre in London. The film was not dubbed, instead it was shown with the original soundtrack and accompanying subtitles.

Both films, Gantz and Perfect Answer, were screened in San Diego, California, as part of Comic-con International at the Gaslamp 15 Theater on 22 and 23 July 2011.

== Reception ==
Entertainment Today said that the first installment of Gantz was good, but that the voice-over work detracted from the experience. Twitch Film published the review of regular reader Brandon Tenold, who stated that the effects were "quite impressive" and called it "a pretty good slice of Japanese-style popcorn cinema." The Japan Times called the second film, Gantz: Perfect Answer, an action-packed but disappointing followup.
