= Gigant (manga) =

Japanese manga series

- Volume 1 cover art, featuring Chiho
- Genre: Science fiction
- Manga
- Written by: Hiroya Oku
- Published by: Shogakukan
- English publisher: NA: Seven Seas Entertainment
- Imprint: Big Comics Special
- Magazine: Big Comic Superior
- Original run: December 8, 2017 – September 24, 2021
- Volumes: 10
- Anime film
- icon

Gigant (stylized in all caps) is a Japanese manga series written and illustrated by Hiroya Oku. It was serialized in Shogakukan's seinen manga magazine Big Comic Superior from December 2017 to September 2021, with its chapters collected in ten tankōbon volumes. An anime film adaptation has been announced.

The series follows pornographic actress Chiho "Papico" Johansson, who gains the ability to grow into a giant. With the support of aspiring film maker Rei Yokoyamada, she uses her power to protect Tokyo from attacking giants.

In North America, the series is licensed in English by Seven Seas Entertainment, who released the volumes in print from March 2020 to December 2022.

== Plot ==
Rei Yokoyamada, a teenager aspiring to become a film maker, learns that the pornographic actress Chiho "Papico" Johansson lives near him. Chiho is shunned by her family and neighbors because of her job, but develops a friendship with Rei. Chiho finds an injured old man wearing a helmet and underwear. When she tries to help him, he attaches a device to her wrist that does not come off, before transforming into a doll. Chiho discovers that the device lets her grow into a giant with incredible strength and durability, and shrink back to her regular size, though the growth only applies to her body, tearing her clothing and leaving her naked. Chiho's insecure and abusive boyfriend Ryuji returns home while she demonstrates her growth power for Rei, and assumes she is cheating on him; she uses her giant power to stop him from assaulting Rei, and Ryuji leaves, ending their relationship. Eventually, Chiho and Rei begin dating.

During this, a website called Enjoy the End becomes popular, where users can vote on proposed events, and the winners become reality regardless of how impossible they should be. These include a rain of excrement; a famous actor running naked through Shinjuku; the death of a celebrity rumored to be a murderer; and an earthquake. Following one request, a gigantic god of destruction descends on Tokyo, demolishing buildings and killing many. At the same time, another gigantic monster attacks New York, and is fought by a gigantic man. Rei's family takes refuge underground, and Chiho uses her giant power to fight and kill the god.

The police identify Chiho as the giant woman, and arrest her on suspicion of criminal insurrection. She faces execution, but is granted amnesty after more giants and three more gods appear, who she manages to kill. After it becomes known that Chiho, now a celebrity, is dating a high school student, she loses entertainment industry opportunities and they decide to put their relationship on hold. Meanwhile, the United States drops a nuclear bomb on Honolulu to stop giants ravaging North America.

A group of time travelers from 2135, dressed like the old man and with similar growth powers, find Chiho, and tell her that two artificial intelligences, Socrates and Plato, were created in 2019 and leaked onto the internet, and, connecting to a Chinese satellite, built a gigantic facility in space from debris; using its machinery, including a bio-printer, the AIs operated Enjoy the End to understand humanity. By 2135, Socrates and Plato have drastically reduced the human population, which is why the group traveled to 2019 to destroy them.

== Media ==
=== Manga ===
Gigant, written and illustrated by Hiroya Oku, was serialized in Shogakukan's seinen manga magazine Big Comic Superior from December 8, 2017, to September 24, 2021. Shogakukan collected its chapters in ten tankōbon volumes, released from May 30, 2018, to December 28, 2021.

In July 2019, Seven Seas Entertainment announced the license of the manga for English language release. The ten volumes were released from March 10, 2020, to December 27, 2022.

==== Volumes ====
No.	Original release date	Original ISBN	English release date	English ISBN
1	May 30, 2018	978-4-09-189875-3	March 10, 2020	978-1-64505-294-4
1. "Actress" (女優, Joyū); 2. "Thanks" (お礼, Orei); 3. "Friends" (友達, Tomodachi); 4. "DVD"; 5. "Night Sky" (夜空, Yozora); 6. "Family" (家族(ファミリー), Famirī); 7. "Secret Room" (密室, Misshitsu); 8. "Ryuji" (竜二, Ryūji); 9. "Poll" (投票, Tōhyō)
2	October 30, 2018	978-4-09-860167-7	June 23, 2020	978-1-64505-474-0
10. "Possibility" (可能性, Kanōsei); 11. "Reply" (返事, Henji); 12. "Tears" (涙, Namida); 13. "Future" (未来, Mirai); 14. "God of Destruction" (破壊神, Hakai-shin); 15. "Descent on Roppongi" (六本木降臨, Roppongi Kōrin); 16. "Refuge" (避難, Hinan); 17. "Heart Palpitations" (動悸, Dōki); 18. "PaPiCo" (パピコ, Papiko)
3	February 28, 2019	978-4-09-860264-3	November 24, 2020	978-1-64505-755-0
19. "Scream" (叫び, Sakebi); 20. "Desperate" (必死, Hisshi); 21. "True Identity" (正体, Shōtai); 22. "Age Gap" (歳の差, Toshi no Sa); 23. "Sleeping Face" (寝顔, Negao); 24. "Criminal" (犯罪者, Hanzai-sha); 25. "Letter" (手紙, Tegami); 26. "Rooftop" (屋上, Okujō); 27. "Super Desperate" (チョー必死, Chō Hisshi); 28. "Road Home" (帰路, Kiro)
4	August 30, 2019	978-4-09-860424-1	January 19, 2021	978-1-64505-946-2
29. "What Can Be Done" (なすすべ, Nasusube); 30. "Robot" (ロボ, Robo); 31. "Surrounded City" (詰んだ町, Tsunda Machi); 32. "Debris" (瓦礫, Gareki); 33. "Pupil" (瞳孔, Dōkō); 34. "Over There" (あっち, Acchi); 35. "Soaring" (飛翔, Hishō); 36. "PaPiCo II" (パピコII, Papiko II); 37. "Close Up" (直視, Chokushi); 38. "Whereabouts" (行方, Yukue)
5	February 28, 2020	978-4-09-860581-1	May 25, 2021	978-1-64827-210-3
39. "Fresh Blood" (鮮血, Senketsu); 40. "Cheer" (歓声, Kansei); 41. "Absent" (不在, Fuzai); 42. "Malfunction" (誤作動, Go Sadō); 43. "Savior" (救世主, Kyūseishu); 44. "Calm" (平穏, Heion); 45. "Satan" (サタン); 46. "Heroes"; 47. "Night Sky II" (夜空II, Yozora II)
6	August 19, 2020	978-4-09-860745-7	October 19, 2021	978-1-64827-348-3
48. "Breakthrough" (大発見, Daihakken); 49. "Eve" (前日, Zenjitsu); 50. "Another World" (異世界, Isekai); 51. "Pool" (プール, Pūru); 52. "Chiho-san" (ちほさん); 53. "Activation" (発動, Hatsudō); 54. "Boyfriend" (彼氏, Kareshi); 55. "Decision" (決断, Ketsudan); 56. "Promise" (約束, Yakusoku)
7	December 25, 2020	978-4-09-860835-5	April 12, 2022	978-1-63858-176-5
57. "A New Morning" (新しい朝, Atarashī Asa); 58. "AI"; 59. "Practice" (練習, Renshū); 60. "The Future" (未来, Mirai); 61. "Socks" (靴下, Kutsushita); 62. "Mochi" (もち); 63. "It's Here" (来た, Kita); 64. "Parting" (別れ, Wakare); 65. "Sortie" (出撃, Shutsugeki)
8	March 30, 2021	978-4-09-861013-6	June 21, 2022	978-1-63858-320-2
66. "Smile" (笑顔, Egao); 67. "First Move" (初手, Shote); 68. "Lieutenant" (少佐, Shōsa); 69. "Difference in Strength" (力の差, Chikara no Sa); 70. "Counterattack" (反撃, Hangeki); 71. "My Daughter" (私の娘, Watashi no Musume); 72. "5 vs 5"; 73. "Desperate Struggle" (死闘, Shitō); 74. "Combo" (コンボ, Konbo)
9	August 30, 2021	978-4-09-861162-1	September 27, 2022	978-1-63858-689-0
75. "Choice" (選択, Sentaku); 76. "Promise II" (約束II, Yakusoku II); 77. "Regret" (無念, Munen); 78. "Hero" (英雄, Eiyū); 79. "The Sky" (上空, Jōkū); 80. "Encounter" (遭遇, Sōgū); 81. "The Human Race" (人類の命, Jinrui no Inochi); 82. "Atomic Blast" (爆風, Bakufū)
10	December 28, 2021	978-4-09-861233-8	December 27, 2022	978-1-63858-873-3
83. "News" (ニュース, Nyūsu); 84. "Memories" (想い出, Omoide); 85. "Shout" (鳴き声, Nakigoe); 86. "Promise III" (約束III, Yakusoku III); 87. "Change" (変化, Henka); 88. "Dream" (夢, Yume); 89. "Movie" (映画, Eiga)

=== Anime film ===
An anime film adaptation was announced at the 2026 Cannes Film Festival in May 2026. It will be produced by K2 Pictures as its first animated film project.

=== Other media ===
Shogakukan published a drawn gravure set featuring Chiho in a bikini in 2019, and a photo set featuring gravure model Aika Sawaguchi cosplaying in Chiho's t-shirt and a bikini in 2020.

== Reception ==
The series has performed well commercially, with over one million volumes in circulation by July 2020. By December 2020, the manga had 1.2 million copies in circulation.
