= Gantz: E =

Japanese manga series

- First tankōbon volume cover
- Genre: Historical; Science fiction
- Manga
- Written by: Hiroya Oku
- Illustrated by: Jin Kagetsu
- Published by: Shueisha
- Imprint: Young Jump Comics
- Magazine: Weekly Young Jump (2020–2023); YanJan! (2024–present)
- Original run: January 9, 2020 – present
- Volumes: 10
- icon

Gantz: E (stylized as GANTZ:E) is a Japanese manga series written by Hiroya Oku and illustrated by Jin Kagetsu. It is a spin-off to Oku's Gantz manga series, set in the Edo period. Gantz: E started in Shueisha's seinen manga magazine Weekly Young Jump in January 2020 and finished in the magazine in December 2023, before being moved to the YanJan! manga app in January 2024.

== Plot ==
Set in the Edo period, Hanbei, a young villager, is rejected by his childhood friend Oharu after she reveals her feelings for another man, Masakichi. Seeking to confront his rival, Hanbei meets Masakichi, but their encounter is interrupted when they attempt to rescue a girl from a river and are swept away, seemingly dying in the process. Instead of dying, they awaken inside a mysterious temple alongside others, where a black sphere known as Gantz assigns them a mission: to hunt and kill a target identified as Miyamoto Musashi.

Transported to a battlefield, the group is attacked by hostile enemies, with many killed before they can properly use the suits and weapons provided by Gantz. Hanbei and Masakichi survive and begin fighting alongside more experienced participants, learning that they cannot return to their lives unless they complete the mission. As they battle increasingly powerful enemies, including giant warriors and skilled swordsmen, they encounter figures resembling Musashi and his associates, who prove far stronger than expected.

As the mission escalates, Hanbei and Masakichi are forced to cooperate despite their rivalry, confronting enemies that surpass human limits while witnessing the deaths of their allies. Just as they are overwhelmed by a powerful opponent believed to be Musashi, a new group of heavily equipped fighters arrives, intervening in the battle.

== Publication ==
Written by Hiroya Oku and illustrated by Jin Kagetsu, Gantz: E started in Shueisha's seinen manga magazine Weekly Young Jump on January 9, 2020. The manga is being published on a monthly basis. Its last chapter in Weekly Young Jump was published on December 7, 2023, and it was transferred to the YanJan! manga app starting on January 9, 2024. Shueisha has collected its chapters into individual tankōbon volumes. The first volume was released on August 19, 2020. As of October 19, 2026, ten volumes have been released.

=== Volumes ===
No.	Japanese release date	Japanese ISBN
1	August 19, 2020	978-4-08-891678-1
2	April 19, 2021	978-4-08-891860-0
3	December 17, 2021	978-4-08-892160-0
4	July 19, 2022	978-4-08-892371-0
5	March 17, 2023	978-4-08-892631-5
6	November 17, 2023	978-4-08-893055-8
7	July 18, 2024	978-4-08-893319-1
8	March 18, 2025	978-4-08-893599-7
9	February 19, 2026	978-4-08-893860-8
10	October 19, 2026	978-4-08-894383-1
