= Yuki Hamano =

Japanese footballer

Personal information
- Full name: Yuki Hamano
- Date of birth: June 23, 1978 (age 48)
- Place of birth: Kagoshima, Japan
- Height: 1.77 m (5 ft 9 1/2 in)
- Position: Defender

Youth career
- 1997–2000: Momoyama Gakuin University

Senior career*
| Years | Team | Apps | (Gls) |
| 2001–2010 | Kataller Toyama | 288 | (38) |
| 2011 | Toyama Shinjo Club | 0 | (0) |
| Total | | 288 | (38) |
- * Club domestic league appearances and goals

Yuki Hamano (濵野 勇気, Hamano Yūki; born June 23, 1978) is a former Japanese football player.

== Club statistics ==
| Club performance | | | League | | Cup | | Total | |
| Season | Club | League | Apps | Goals | Apps | Goals | Apps | Goals |
| Japan | | | League | | Emperor's Cup | | Total | |
|---|---|---|---|---|---|---|---|---|
| 2001 | YKK | Football League | 30 | 0 | - | | 30 | 0 |
| 2002 | YKK | Football League | 16 | 3 | | | 16 | 3 |
| 2003 | YKK | Football League | 28 | 4 | - | | 28 | 4 |
| 2004 | YKK AP | Football League | 23 | 2 | - | | 23 | 2 |
| 2005 | YKK AP | Football League | 28 | 10 | - | | 28 | 10 |
| 2006 | YKK AP | Football League | 32 | 4 | 3 | 0 | 35 | 4 |
| 2007 | YKK AP | Football League | 30 | 6 | - | | 30 | 6 |
| 2008 | Kataller Toyama | J2 League | 32 | 4 | 2 | 0 | 34 | 4 |
| 2009 | Kataller Toyama | J2 League | 42 | 3 | 1 | 0 | 43 | 3 |
| 2010 | Kataller Toyama | J2 League | 27 | 2 | 1 | 0 | 28 | 2 |
| Total | Japan | | 288 | 38 | 7 | 0 | 295 | 38 |
| Career total | | | 288 | 38 | 7 | 0 | 295 | 38 |
