= Gantz =

Japanese manga series

- First tankōbon volume cover, featuring Kei Kurono, Masaru Kato, and the rest of the group
- Genre: Action; Psychological horror; Psychological thriller; Science fiction
- Manga
- Written by: Hiroya Oku
- Published by: Shueisha
- English publisher: NA: Dark Horse Comics
- Imprint: Young Jump Comics
- Magazine: Weekly Young Jump
- Original run: June 29, 2000 – June 20, 2013
- Volumes: 37
- Anime television series
- Directed by: Ichirō Itano
- Produced by: Toshiharu Namiki; Futoshi Nishimura; Yasushi Uchida; Hironori Terashima
- Written by: Masashi Sogo
- Music by: Natsuki Sogawa; Yasuharu Takanashi (6–26)
- Studio: Gonzo
- Licensed by: Crunchyroll (Note: In North America through Crunchyroll, LLC (formerly known as Funimation) and in Australia through Crunchyroll Store Australia (formerly known as Madman Entertainment).); UK: MVM Films
- Original network: Fuji TV (1–13); AT-X (14–26)
- English network: US: Anime Network
- Original run: April 13, 2004 – November 18, 2004
- Episodes: 26
- Films
- Live-action films (2011); Gantz: O (2016)
- Spin-offs
- Gantz: G (2015–17); Gantz: E (2020–present)
- icon

Gantz (stylized in all caps) is a Japanese manga series written and illustrated by Hiroya Oku. It was serialized in Shueisha's seinen manga magazine Weekly Young Jump from June 2000 to June 2013, with its chapters collected in 37 tankōbon volumes. It tells the story of Kei Kurono and Masaru Kato, both of whom died in a train accident and become part of a semi-posthumous "game" in which they and several other recently deceased people are forced to hunt down and kill aliens armed with a handful of futuristic items, equipment, and weaponry.

An anime television series adaptation, directed by Ichirō Itano and animated by Gonzo, was broadcast for 26 episodes, divided into two seasons, in 2004. A series of two live-action films based on the manga were produced and released in January and April 2011. A CGI anime film, Gantz: O, was released in 2016.

== Plot ==
High school students Kei Kurono and Masaru Kato die after being struck by a subway train while attempting to save a drunk homeless man who had fallen onto the tracks. Upon their deaths, they awaken inside a barren Tokyo apartment alongside other confused participants. Trapped within the room, they encounter a large black sphere known as "Gantz". The sphere assigns missions where participants must hunt and kill alien targets hidden on Earth, providing them with advanced weaponry—including powered suits and energy weapons.

During missions, the participants are transported to the target location and confined there until all enemies are killed or the time limit expires. Normal humans cannot perceive the players or the aliens. Those who survive are awarded points based on their kills. Upon accumulating 100 points, a participant gains access to a menu offering three choices: returning to normal life with erased memories; obtaining a powerful weapon; or reviving a deceased teammate. After their initial missions, Kurono and Kato face brutal battles that result in heavy casualties. During their third mission, Kato sacrifices himself to defeat the final target, allowing Kurono to survive despite severe injuries. This experience profoundly changes Kurono, who adopts a more heroic mindset and resolves to revive his fallen comrades. He later leads a new team of Gantz players, demonstrating exceptional combat prowess and leadership. Eventually, Kurono revives Kato, only to perish himself in a subsequent battle against a group of vampires.

As the story progresses, the rules of the missions evolve. Ordinary humans become able to witness the battles, and the aliens grow increasingly formidable. The participants eventually engage in a joint mission with a rival Gantz team from Osaka. Kato, now the central figure, fights desperately to revive Kurono, culminating in a battle against the powerful alien Nurarihyon. Though Kato succeeds in defeating the creature, he is left critically wounded.

An experienced participant named Joichiro Nishi later reveals a hidden "catastrophe countdown" on the Gantz sphere, indicating an impending global threat. One week later, Earth is invaded by a massive alien force intent on exterminating humanity. Kurono and his allies utilize Gantz technology to mount a defense. It is eventually revealed that an advanced alien species provided humanity with Gantz as a means of survival, though their motives for doing so remain a mystery.

In the final confrontation, the alien leader Eeva challenges humanity, threatening to destroy the planet unless Kurono faces him in battle. With the world watching, Kurono, aided by Kato, defeats Eeva and prevents Earth's annihilation. The series concludes with Kurono and Kato returning as heroes.

== Production ==
Hiroya Oku first conceived the story of Gantz during his high school years, drawing inspiration from the jidaigeki television series Hissatsu and Robert Sheckley's novel Time Killer. However, he did not commit to developing Gantz until after completing the manga Zero One, which featured a similar setting. Oku concluded Zero One because he found it insufficiently entertaining and too costly to produce.

For the manga's production, Oku began by drafting thumbnails of the pages. He then constructed 3D models of the characters and backgrounds on his computer. After printing these elements, he applied tone and color manually, finishing with sound effects and dialogue. Although he had employed a similar method in Zero One, that series involved less hand-drawing; for Gantz, Oku increased the amount of manual illustration to achieve a more realistic aesthetic and to reduce costs. He noted, however, that the process remained time-consuming, requiring rapid work to meet publication deadlines.

Oku sought to incorporate realism into Gantz and indicated that certain events in the story reflected his personal views on world issues. During violent or erotic scenes, he avoided prolonging them excessively to maintain the series' realistic tone. He stated that he did not engage in self-censorship and that all illustrated content was published as originally drawn. Several plot twists were designed to subvert common manga tropes, such as the deaths of major characters like Kei Kishimoto and Masaru Kato. Prior to serialization, Oku informed his assistants that—with the exception of protagonist Kei Kurono—all main characters would eventually die.

== Media ==
=== Manga ===
Written and illustrated by Hiroya Oku, Gantz started in Shueisha's seinen manga magazine Weekly Young Jump on June 29, 2000. (Note: It debuted in the magazine's 31st issue of 2000, released on June 29 of that same year.) Gantz is divided into three main story arcs, referred to as "phases". After the completion of phase one (first 237 chapters) on July 20, 2006, the author put the series on hiatus for a short time to work on phase two (chapters 238–303), which was serialized from November 22, 2006, to July 2, 2009. The third and final phase (chapters 303–383) started on October 1, 2009, and the series finished after about 13 years of publication on June 20, 2013. Shueisha collected its chapters in 37 tankōbon volumes, released from December 11, 2000, to August 19, 2013. An 18-volume bunkoban edition was published by Shueisha from December 18, 2015, to August 18, 2016. A vertical-scrolling full-color edition of the series, released under the title Gantz: T, started on Shueisha's Jump Toon vertical-scrolling manga service on July 7, 2024. Shine Partners is in charge of the coloring.

In North America, publishing company Dark Horse Comics acquired the licensing rights for the release of English translations of Gantz on July 1, 2007, during the Anime Expo. The 37 volumes were published between June 25, 2008, and October 28, 2015. Dark Horse Comics republished the series in a 3-in-1 twelve-volume omnibus edition from August 22, 2018, to July 5, 2023. In July 2026, Dark Horse Comics announced a deluxe edition, with the first volume (collecting the first three original volumes) set to release on April 6, 2027.

==== Spin-offs ====
Gantz/Osaka, showing the stories of the Gantz Osaka team, has been published in Japan in 2010 and compiled in 3 volumes released by Shueisha between October 20 and December 17, 2010. A special chapter Gantz no Moto that has Hiroya Oku telling the story on how he got into the manga business and what films influenced him was published in Miracle Jump on January 13, 2011. A one-shot chapter Gantz/Nishi, showing the life of Nishi, was published in Weekly Young Jump on May 12, 2011.

A spin-off, titled Gantz G, was published from November 2015 to March 2017. The manga was written by Oku and illustrated by Keita Iizuka.

A historical spin-off of Gantz titled Gantz: E, written by Oku and illustrated by Jin Kagetsu started in January 2020.

=== Anime ===
Gantz was adapted into a 26-episode anime television series by Gonzo, with series composition and scripts written by Masashi Sogo, characters designs by Naoyuki Onda, and music composed by Natsuki Sogawa; Yasuharu Takanashi also composed the music from episode 6 onwards. The series aired for two seasons, labeled as "stages". The first stage was broadcast for 11 episodes (out of 13 originally produced) on Fuji TV from April 13 to June 22, 2004. (Note: Fuji TV listed the air dates for the series on Monday at 26:28, which is effectively Tuesday at 2:28 a.m. JST.) The first stage aired on Fuji TV with several scenes censored, due to content that were deemed inappropriate, such as violence or nudity. However, the DVD releases contained the scenes uncensored. The second stage was broadcast for 13 episodes on AT-X from August 26 to November 18, 2004. The episodes were collected on 12 DVDs, released by Shochiku, from August 25, 2004, to June 29, 2005.

In North America, ADV Films announced that they had licensed the series in 2004. It was released in uncut form, retaining the violence and nudity previously censored in Japan for broadcast. Ten DVDs were released from February 8, 2005, to January 17, 2006. The series began broadcast in Anime Network in 2005. In June 2010, Funimation announced that they had acquired the rights to the series; they released a complete DVD set on January 25, 2011.

Gantz: O, a 3D CGI animated film adaptation, was released in 2016.

=== Video game ===
On March 17, 2005, Konami published a game for the PlayStation 2 in Japan named simply as Gantz: The Game. It features the characters and plot up to the Chibi Alien mission. The game mixes third-person shooter and role-playing game (RPG) elements together. The game also includes extras including Free Play mode, a Mini Mode, Magazine Browser mode, Gantz Rankings, a special preview movie and the scenario completion statistic.

=== Novel ===
A novel, titled Gantz/Minus, written by Masatoshi Kusakabe and illustrated by Yusuke Kozaki, started serialization in Weekly Young Jump on July 23, 2009, being the first time that a novel was serialized in the magazine. It takes place before the events of the manga, with the focus being on the characters Shion Izumi and Joichiro Nishi, who participate in Gantz's missions. It was later released as a collected volume on May 19, 2010.

Another novel, titled Gantz/EXA, planned by Yumeaki Hirayama, written by Junjo Shindo and illustrated by Koji Ogata, began serialization in Weekly Young Jump on September 16, 2010. It was later released as a collected volume on January 19, 2011.

=== Live-action films ===
On November 24, 2009, it was announced that two live-action Gantz films were in production. The films star Kazunari Ninomiya and Kenichi Matsuyama in the roles of Kurono and Kato respectively, and were directed by Shinsuke Sato. The films were released in January and April 2011.

The first film, titled simply as Gantz, was released in Japan on January 29, 2011. A special North American screening took place on January 20, 2011, during which the film was simulcast in theaters across 46 states. At the end of this special Los Angeles showing, which took place at the Mann's Chinese 6 theatre, there was a discussion and live interview with both the male leads, as well as a teaser trailer for the second installment, Gantz: Perfect Answer, which was released in Japan on April 23, 2011. Gantz and Gantz: Perfect Answer were screened in San Diego as part of San Diego Comic-Con at the Gaslamp 15 Theater on July 22 and 23.

In May 2020, it was reported that Sony Pictures is adapting Gantz with writer Marc Guggenheim. In November 2021, it was announced that Julius Avery was hired to direct the film.

=== Other ===
A companion book titled Gantz/Manual was published by Shueisha on December 17, 2004. The book features episode summaries, character overviews, and additional background details on the Gantz universe. A revised edition, Gantz/Manual Remix, was published in 2011 as a supplement for Gantz manga and live-action film featuring story act summaries, manga story arc summaries, character overviews, and additional background details on the Gantz universe.

== Reception ==
Japanese sales from the Gantz manga have led several of the volumes to be featured in lists of best seller volumes from Japan. By November 2010, the Gantz manga had sold over 10 million units in Japan, while during January 2011 the sales increased to over 15 million volumes. By June 2013, the manga had reportedly sold 20 million copies. By April 2021, the manga had over 24 million copies in circulation.

During 2008, Dark Horse Comics announced that the Gantz series had sold 175,000 copies in America. Volume 4 of the manga reached eighth place on The New York Times "Manga Best Seller List". About.com's Deb Aoki listed Gantz as the best new seinen manga of 2008 along with Black Lagoon.

DVD sales of Gantz have been particularly strong. The third DVD volume significantly outsold the first, according to ADV Films. Strong sales ensured the continued release of subsequent volumes, making the series one of 2005's most successful anime franchises. Christopher MacDonald of Anime News Network called it one of Japan's favorite TV anime in October 2006.

The Gantz anime has been described as being extremely "violent", "gory" and "sadistic" and yet is also very "addictive", even when it was censored during broadcast.
