= Hiroya Oku =

Japanese manga artist (born 1967)

- Born: September 16, 1967 (age 59) Fukuoka, Japan
- Pseudonyms: Kuon Yahiro; Yuki Ikeda
- Notable works: Hen; Gantz; Inuyashiki; Gigant; Thunder 3
- Awards: Runner-up in Young Jump Youth Manga Awards (1988, Hen)

Hiroya Oku (奥 浩哉, Oku Hiroya; born September 16, 1967) is a Japanese manga artist, known for his works Hen, Gantz, Inuyashiki, and Gigant. Originally influenced by Katsuhiro Otomo and Ryoichi Ikegami, his manga often contain explicit violence, sexual depictions, and matters that are considered taboo by the public, and he is known as a pioneer in the use of digital processing for manga backgrounds.

His debut manga, Hen, was a runner-up in the 1988 Young Jump Youth Manga Awards. The pseudonym he used at the time was Kuon Yahiro (久遠 矢広, Yahiro Kuron).

Oku designed a character named Shura for Namco Bandai's Xbox 360 and PlayStation 3 fighting game Soulcalibur IV.

Oku created the manga series Thunder 3, published under the pen name Yuki Ikeda (池田 祐輝, Ikeda Yūki) from 2022 to 2026. Oku revealed his identity as Ikeda on his X account in September 2026.

In an August 2026 interview, Oku stated that he would retire after finishing his latest manga series The Sweet Sixty Princess.

== Works ==
- Hen (変; lit. 'Strangeness') (1989–1994): published in Shueisha's Weekly Young Jump and collected in 13 tankōbon volumes.
- Hen (1995–1997): published in Shueisha's Weekly Young Jump and collected in eight tankōbon volumes.
- Zero One (1999–2000): published in Shueisha's Weekly Young Jump and collected in three tankōbon volumes.
- Gantz (2000–2013): published in Shueisha's Weekly Young Jump and collected in 37 tankōbon volumes.
- Maetel no Kimochi (め～てるの気持ち; lit. 'Maetel's Feelings') (2006–2007): published in Shueisha's Weekly Young Jump and collected in three tankōbon volumes.
- Inuyashiki (いぬやしき) (2014–2017): published in Kodansha's Evening and collected in ten tankōbon volumes.
- Gantz:G (2015–2017): written by Oku (first volume) and Tomohito Ohsaki (volumes 2 and 3) and illustrated by Keita Iizuka. Published in Shueisha's Miracle Jump and Shōnen Jump+ (final chapter only) and collected in three tankōbon volumes.
- Gigant (2017–2021): published in Shogakukan's Big Comic Superior and collected in ten tankōbon volumes.
- Gantz:E (2020–present): illustrated by Jin Kagetsu. Published in Shueisha's Weekly Young Jump (2020–2023) and YanJan! (since 2024) and collected in nine tankōbon volumes (as of February 2026).
- Thunder 3 (2022–2026): published as "Yuki Ikeda" in Kodansha's Monthly Shōnen Magazine and collected in ten tankōbon volumes.
- The Sweet Sixty Princess (還暦姫, Kanreki Hime) (2025–present): published in Shogakukan's Big Comic Superior and collected in one tankōbon volume (as of May 2026).
