= List of Gantz episodes =

Cover from the first Gantz released by ADV Films.

The anime series Gantz is an adaptation of the eponymous manga written and illustrated by Hiroya Oku. The series, produced by Gonzo and directed by Ichiro Itano, aired in Japan on Fuji Television and AT-X. Gantz tells the story of a teenager named Kei Kurono who dies in a train accident and becomes part of a semi-posthumous "game" in which he and several other recently deceased people are forced to hunt down and kill aliens hidden in Japan.

The song "Super Shooter" by Rip Slyme serves as the opening theme to every episode and the song "Last Kiss" by Bonnie Pink serves as the closing credits music. The Gantz anime is divided into two seasons: The first season is known as "The First Stage", while the second season is known as "The Second Stage", which is a direct continuation of the first season. The First Stage aired in Japan with several scenes censored due to inappropriate content such as violence and nudity. However, the DVDs from the series contained the scenes uncensored. The Second Stage aired on Japanese network AT-X on August 26, 2004. There are a total of 12 Japanese DVDs, released from August 28, 2004, to June 29, 2005. Additionally, the DVDs were compiled into box sets.

In 2004 ADV Films announced that they had licensed the Gantz anime series and would release it on DVD uncensored. The series was initially released in a 2-episode-per-disc format spanning 10 volumes, before later being released in various box set forms. On June 25, 2010, at the Funicon 4.0, Funimation announced that they had license rescued Gantz for release in the North American market in 2011.

== Episode list ==
=== Season 1 ===
No.	Title	Original release date
1	"It's the Beginning of a Brand New Day"; Transliteration: "Atarashii Asa ga Kita" (Japanese: 新しい朝が来た)	April 12, 2004
Kei Kurono, an apathetic, self-centered, and sexually frustrated teenager, crosses paths with Masaru Katou, an old childhood friend. The pair save a homeless man from being run over by a train, but die on the process. They later appear in a room centered around a black globe with other people who have recently died: a school teacher, a dog, a politician, a long-haired blond man, two Yakuza gang members and a mysterious young 8th-Grader named Nishi. Before long, a naked young girl is teleported to the room, and one of the Yakuza men attempts to rape her before he is stopped by Katou.
2	"They Aren't Human"; Transliteration: "Ningen Janee" (Japanese: 人間じゃねぇ)	April 19, 2004
The Black Globe tells them to kill Neigi Seijin, a green onion alien, and opens up, revealing guns and suits. The men take the guns but ignore the suits, except Kei who puts one on. Everyone goes off looking for the alien, as apparently there is a reward for killing it. Kei, Katou, and the girl go off on their own trying to find a way home. The politician does the same, until his head inexplicably blows up. The Yakuzas, schoolteacher and the blond man find 'Neigi Seijin'. He turns out to be a young boy, but that doesn't stop them from killing him. His father later appears, looking enraged at what has happened.
3	"Kei, You're Awesome!"; Transliteration: "Kei-chan, sugē" (Japanese: 計ちゃん、すっげえ)	April 19, 2004
The big Neigi Seijin kills four of the men while the schoolteacher accidentally shoots another one. With only three people left, the alien attacks Katou, Kei and the girl. During the chase, they find out the suits allow them to jump further and survive. The alien badly wounds Katou, angering Kei so much that he starts fighting back. With the help from the suit, he wins. An unseen figure fires a belt that ties up the alien. He reveals himself to be Nishi and urges Kei to shoot the alien.
4	"OK, Here Are Your Scores"; Transliteration: "Sore ji wa, chiiten wo hajinuru" (Japanese: それぢわ、 ちいてんをはじぬる)	April 27, 2004
Kei drops his gun, refusing to kill the alien. Nishi takes the points and finishes it. Back in the room, the scores are revealed-Nishi got three giving him 90 points, the others get nothing. He explains he has been coming to the room for a long time and that it makes fax copies of people just before they die. Anyone still alive can return home fully recovered. When Kei awakes in his apartment, he sees the deaths of the men killed earlier announced on the news, including the supposed death of himself. He knows that it was not simply a dream when he notices the suit lying on a chair in his room.
5	"Then That Means, at That Time..."; Transliteration: "Tteiukoto wa ano toki" (Japanese: っていうことは あの時)	May 4, 2004
Kei goes to school, where he gets into trouble with a group of bullies. To protect himself, he puts on the suit underneath his clothes. He later sees the thugs attack a man for money and attempts to protect him. The leader gets furious and pummels Kei until he zones out. He fantasizes about Kishimoto, the girl from earlier, and gets an erection, which powers the suit and makes Kei able to beat the gang leader and flee. Meanwhile, Kishimoto goes home and discovers that she is a duplicate without a place to return to. It is also revealed that Katou and his brother are living with an abusive, uncharitable aunt.
6	"All Right!"; Transliteration: "Yattaaaaa!" (Japanese: やったああああっ)	May 11, 2004
Kishimoto visits Kei and frantically asks him to keep her as a 'pet'. He accepts, ecstatic about the prospect and fantasizing about the many sexual implications of the term "pet". He propositions sex, but Kishimoto refuses. She tells him that she is having emotional troubles and breaks into a sob, and so he leaves her be. Elsewhere, Katou finds out that his little brother is being physically abused by their aunt. Meanwhile a gang of bikers led by a man named Tetsu attack a middle-aged man who stands up to them, humiliating him in front of his son.
7	"We're After You"; Transliteration: "Neratteruze" (Japanese: 狙ってるぜ)	May 18, 2004
Katou's aunt continues mistreating her nephews, but Katou fights back this time. He also stands up to some bullies at school, causing a bigger, older bully to plan his revenge. Katou hears of this plot, walks right into the toilets and beats him up. While doing so, he imagines the face of his aunt in his place, venting his anger. Meanwhile, Kishimoto regrets the fact that she cannot go to school and asks Kei if he could accompany her to see her old home one last time. Kei agrees and when they get there, she cannot help but cry. In a book shop, a mysterious girl stalks Hojo, an attractive young man.
8	"Uh-oh!"; Transliteration: "Yabee!" (Japanese: やべぇ)	May 25, 2004
Kishimoto gets over her initial shock, and decides to lead her life how she, not her mother, wants. She declares her love for Katou, surprising Kei. Meanwhile, a new biker gang kills Tetsu and three of his men. Hojo realizes he is carrying his stalker on his motorbike and he gets furious. They both get killed (along with Ryouta, a spoiled kid, and his grandmother) by a lorry driver asleep at the wheel. All 13 players are simultaneously transported to the room and the globe tells them to kill Suzuki-Seijin, a robotic-looking creature. Kei realizes to his horror that he has left his suit behind.
9	"Kill It There!"; Transliteration: "Sokkō Korosu" (Japanese: ソッコー殺す)	June 1, 2004
Everyone ends up wearing a suit, except Kei and the three underling bikers. Nishi begins taunting everyone in the room, mainly about how they only rely on other people (specifically in Kishimoto's case), and how they will fail and die. One of the bikers, Kosuke, loses his temper and fires at him. The gun appears to have no effect. Nishi fires his own gun and Kosuke's head implodes. He tells the globe, Gantz, to begin, and they are transported out of the room. Kei appears alone on a street, in front of Suzuki-Seijin.
10	"Yuuzou-kun?"; Transliteration: "Yūzō-kun?" (Japanese: 裕三君 ?)	June 8, 2004
Kei, without a suit, runs away from the alien to find the others. Nishi fights it in a canal, but his equipment starts failing on him: his invisibility device breaks; his gun ceases to work and his suit floods with water. He asks the biker for help, but they are still angry at him. Nishi refuses to apologize for killing Kosuke despite his predicament, so Katou jumps into the fray to save him.
11	"I Can't Shoot Him"; Transliteration: "Aitsu wa Utenai" (Japanese: あいつは撃てない)	June 8, 2004
Katou and Kei-chan manage to send the creature into space, but not before Nishi, gets badly wounded. He asks Gantz to hurry up and transport them back before he dies, but the group finds out that they will have to deal with more than one alien before this is over. Nishi reveals that he did what he did because he wanted to get home to his mother, because people need 100 points to escape Gantz. Then, he dies. Meanwhile, Kinji's head blows off when he tries to leave the perimeter.
12	"Please stay here, Katou-kun"; Transliteration: "Katō-kun wa Matteite" (Japanese: 加藤くんは待っていて)	June 15, 2004
The team splits to find the other Suzuki aliens. Katou, Kishimoto and Hojo find five and a fight starts. During it, Katou's suit runs out of power and two aliens fly away to find Ryouta and his grandmother. The grandmother fights back, but the two of them end up dying. Meanwhile, Haruya forces Kei and Tetsu into a building where six Suzuki and the apparent boss, a giant bird, are hiding.
13	"Please Die..."; Transliteration: "Shinde Kudachii" (Japanese: 死んで下ちい)	June 22, 2004
Hojo and Kishimoto kill the two remaining Suzuki while Kei tries to shoot the boss, to no avail. The Suzuki start screaming, causing the building to collapse. All the survivors arrive outside. Kei is jubilant, believing he has killed them all, but the boss emerges from the rubble and kills Haruya. It then grabs Kei by the arm and flies high into the air. Kei fights back and the bird drops him. He shoots it on his way down and manages to blow its head off. The group is transported back to the room, where Katou gets five points, Hojo and Kishimoto get ten each while Kei gets 38, the most of anybody thus far.: The Japanese episode title is a pun. By replacing "sa (さ)" with "chi (ち)", the title appears as "kudachii" - not a real Japanese word - instead of "kudasai" or "please".

=== Season 2 ===
No.	Title	Original release date
14	"Goodbye..."; Transliteration: "Sayōnara" (Japanese: さようなら)	August 26, 2004
Katou and his brother leave their aunt and move to an apartment. Kei grows tired of Kishimoto constantly talking about Katou and confronts her about it. Kishimoto feels guilty and leaves his apartment. Tetsu returns home, where his wife tells him he has been fired at work and she is suspicious that he may be having an affair. Frustrated, he goes out to buy some milk for their baby and runs into the gang who killed him and his friends. He gets furious, and in his anger, he mentions Gantz. Because uttering that name outside the game is forbidden, Tetsu's head explodes.
15	"Go Fast!"; Transliteration: "Hayaku Ikitee!" (Japanese: 早くイキてぇっ)	September 2, 2004
Kishimoto is homeless and Kei starts regretting what he said to her. He pulls on his suit and screams for Gantz to take him back. He appears in the room with nine new people and realizes that Tetsu is dead. Jealous of Katou, Kei goes to the side room and cries. A woman called Sakuraoka follows him, comforts him and asks if there is anything she can do to help. Kei asks for sex, which she agrees to. The globe tells them to kill two aliens, both of whom appear to be temple guards. Kishimoto catches Sakuraoka and Kei having sex, but they carry on regardless as the rest of the group suit up.
16	"It's Me!"; Transliteration: "Ore ga yaru!" (Japanese: 俺がやる)	September 9, 2004
Everyone puts on their suit. As they are beamed out one by one, Kishimoto notices they have 1½ hours instead of just one. Four players attempt to go home, until one of them dies instantly and Katou saves the rest. A man, Kajimura Ryuji and teenager, Muroto Hajime, look through the X-gun and see that the two giant statues at the temple entrance have bones. Kei smashes the door and the statues come to life, enraged.
17	"Is It OK to Shoot Them?"; Transliteration: "Koitsura utte iin daro?" (Japanese: こいつら撃っていいんだろ)	September 16, 2004
Kei tries to shoot one of the aliens, to no avail. During the fight, one of the players, a Buddhist priest, dies. The homeless man that Kei and Katou saved at the subway wanders his way into the temple. Mirafuji, a slightly geeky young man, starts shooting at random, not caring who he hits. The green alien knocks Katou down, and Kishimoto moves in to protect him. In the end, Kei kills it at the same time as some "hobo hunters" kill the homeless man.
18	"Welcome Back"; Transliteration: "Okaeri" (Japanese: おかえり)	September 23, 2004
The team goes after the red statue, who appears to be significantly more powerful. It grabs Kei and tries to crush him, but a sniper on the roof kills it and saves him. Mirafuji blasts away at the dead alien, laughing as he does so, and the team regards him with disgust. Sakuraoka asks Kei if he will go out with her once they are back. With a quick glance at Kishimoto, he agrees somewhat unenthusiastically. Meanwhile, two members of the team leave the temple and see another smaller statue jump down from a rooftop. Then many more statues begin to emerge.
19	"What the Hell is This?"; Transliteration: "Nanja, Aryaaa" (Japanese: なんじゃ、ありゃあっ)	September 30, 2004
While the team fights off the smaller statues, a colossal Buddha statue (Daibutsu) emerges from the temple building. The team attempts to shoot it, but their bullets have little effect. Without warning, a woman (who Kei identifies as his teacher) and a man appear and inadvertently step right into the path of the Daibutsu. The players work to stop the statue's foot from crushing the pair, who eventually leaves. Kei shoots the statue in the head, leaving a gaping hole. He then proceeds to launch himself inside, killing it internally. The statue crashes to the ground, and out crawls Kei from its mouth.
20	"Shoot Me!"; Transliteration: "Ore o Utee!" (Japanese: 俺を撃てっ)	October 7, 2004
Katou stumbles upon the dead homeless man and breaks down. Kei reminds him that his brother needs him. Meanwhile, Hojo's group stumble upon a much larger group of aliens. They all die during the fight, and Hojo and his stalker spend their last moments together, sharing a kiss. One alien shoots acid at Katou, but Kishimoto jumps in front of him and saves him. She dies in the process, making Kei snap out and attack the remaining statues. One alien manages to get him, burning an arm and a leg away. Sakuraoka rescues him and, after a successful retreat, Kei asks Katou to shoot him and end his misery.
21	"Brother?"; Transliteration: "Nii-chan?" (Japanese: 兄ちゃん)	October 14, 2004
Katou shoots Kei's leg, stopping the corrosion, but Kei is still immobile. The statue kills three more players. Sakuraoka stands by Kei and defends him, kicking the acid thrown by the alien back at it and burning half of its body. The statue kills Sakuraoka and goes after Katou, who steals one of the alien's swords and uses it to kill it. In one final move, the alien pierces Katou in the heart, killing him. While Katou's little brother is out looking for him in the city, Kei is transported back into the room, crying for his lost friends. He scores only a measly 8 points, bringing his total up to 46. He leaves the room completely alone.
22	"Don't Ever Say That Again!"; Transliteration: "Nido to Iu na!" (Japanese: 二度と言うな)	October 21, 2004
Having barely survived the last mission, Kei is drawn back in a few weeks later. This time the players are people who have all been either directly or indirectly involved in Kei's life. We see how they die and consequently end up in the room. Once there, they introduce themselves accordingly in an attempt to figure out what is going on. Gantz, however, decides to add a little twist to the game: the target to kill has been set as Kei himself.
23	"Kurono Alien"; Transliteration: "Kurono Seijin" (Japanese: 玄野星人)	October 28, 2004
The group turns on Kei, suspecting him of being an alien that they must kill. The hobo hunters and Uehara Yoshino, Kei's teacher, turn their guns on Kei, but he manages to escape with a gun. They all begin to hallucinate, seeing Kei as the person who killed them or the person they most fear. Eventually, one of the players, bank worker Saito Naozumi, shoots at Kei, making him run away. They chase him throughout a building, eventually cornering him in a room. Kajimura Ryuji, the older hobo hunter, takes Kanda Mika, a friend of Kei, as a hostage and tries to get him to surrender.
24	"There's No Labyrinth I Can't Get Out Of!!"; Transliteration: "Derarenai Meikyū wa Nain da!" (Japanese: 出られない迷宮はないんだ)	November 4, 2004
Kei saves Kanda from Ryuji and they both run away. Later, she tells him that Sakuraoka had given her a book, the one she told Kei that they would pick up together. She needs it back, as it means a lot to her, so Kei separates from her and runs back to the players. The starts to turn on Ryuji and Muroto, after they realize they are "hobo killers". Kei jumps in while Ryuji takes Kei's teacher and flees. Furuta, the book shop owner, gives Kei the book, and they go after the two men and their hostage. Kei's teacher, badly wounding Ryuki in the process. Muroto then shoots Kei's teacher and escapes.
25	"Let's Go Back Alive"; Transliteration: "Ikite kaerō ze" (Japanese: 生きて帰ろうぜ)	November 11, 2004
The remaining Gantz players head off in pursuit of Muroto and Ryuji and are all taken out one by one by Muroto and Ryuji. Furuta tries to reason with Muroto, but he tricks him and ends up killing Saito and badly wounding Nozaki. One by one they die; Nozaki is shot and killed by Ryuji, and Furuta is killed with an explosive from Muroto. Ryuji has strapped explosives to himself and detonates them, trying to take Kei with him. Ryuji dies, but the fate of Kei is left unknown.
26	"Please Live!"; Transliteration: "Ikite kure!" (Japanese: 生きてくれ)	November 18, 2004
Kei survives the explosion and leaves to find whoever is left. Muroto shoots Kanda and faces off Kei for a final battle, in which Muroto's past is revealed as one of abuse. Instead of killing him, Kei transports him out of the area, and gets a vision of the train station where he and Katou died. The train speeds towards him while his recently deceased friends cheer him on. He tries to outrun it like before, but stops and realizes he is being given a choice; he chooses to live. He turns around, points a finger in the shape of a gun at the train and shouts "Bang!". Gantz disappears, and it is unknown whether Kei lives or not. After the credits, we see a train speeding through the empty station, with no-one in sight.

== See also ==
- List of Gantz chapters
- List of Gantz characters
