= List of Gantz chapters =

Cover of the first Gantz tankōbon, which was released in Japan by Shueisha on December 11, 2000

The chapters of the Japanese manga Gantz are written and illustrated by Hiroya Oku, and have been published in the Japanese manga anthology Weekly Young Jump since its issue 32 published in 2000. The plot follows a teenager named Kei Kurono and his friend Masaru Kato who die in a train accident and become part of a semi-posthumous game in which they, and several other recently deceased people, are forced to hunt down and kill aliens.

Gantz is divided into three main story arcs referred to as "phases". After the completion of Phase 1, the author put the series on hiatus for a short time to work on Phase 2, which is also known as "Catastrophe". Phase 1 consists of the first 237 chapters. On November 22, 2006, the first chapter of Phase 2, chapter 238, was released. As of chapter 303, the series was put in hiatus once again in order to let Oku prepare in the making of the final arc of the series. The series continued serialization in October from 2009. The individual chapters are collected by Shueisha in tankōbon format; the first volume was released on December 11, 2000. 37 volumes have been released by Shueisha. An anime adaptation, produced by Gonzo and directed by Ichiro Itano, aired in Japan on Fuji Television and AT-X.

Publishing company Dark Horse Comics acquired the licensing rights for the release of English translations of Gantz on July 1, 2007, during the Anime Expo. The first English volume was released on June 25, 2008. While the first three were being published quarterly, the following volumes are being released on a bimonthly basis. As of July 2015, 36 volumes have been released by Dark Horse Comics. The series is published by Glénat in Spain, by Grupo Editorial Vid in Mexico, by Tonkam in France, by Planet Manga in Germany, Italy, Brazil, by Editorial Ivrea in Argentina and by Kotori in Poland

== Volume list ==
=== Volumes 1–20 ===
No.	Original release date	Original ISBN	English release date	English ISBN
1	December 11, 2000	978-4-08-876105-3	June 25, 2008	978-1-59307-949-9
1. "A Certain Accident" (ある事故, Aru Jiko); 2. "The Enigma Room" (不可解な部屋, Fukakai na Heya); 3. "The Naked Suicide Girl" (裸の自殺少女, Hadaka no Jisatsu Shōjo); 4. "Command from the Black Sphere" (黒球の指令, Kuro Tama no Shirei); 5. "Illusion" (イリュージョン, Iryūjon); 6. "Encounter with the Onion Alien" (ねぎ星人との遭遇, Negi Seijin to no Sōgū); 7. "Non-Preplanned Harmony" (非予定調和, Hi-yotei Chōwa); 8. "Slaughter" (惨殺, Zansatsu); 9. "Eichmann Test" (アイヒマンテスト, Aihiman Tesuto); 10. "Rage" (激憤, Gekifun)
A pair of high school students, Kei Kurono and Masaru Kato, are hit by a subway train after saving the life of a drunk homeless man who had fallen onto the tracks. Kurono and Kato find themselves transported, along with a number of other people who have also recently died, to a room inside a building in Tokyo. By way of green text that appears on the surface of a black sphere named Gantz the group is informed that they have to kill a little creature, apparently an alien, to survive. They are transported out of the building and Kato, Kurono and a girl named Kei Kishimoto attempt to return to their homes. The remaining participants are able to kill the alien using weapons provided by Gantz. After killing the small alien, a much larger and more menacing alien appears and kills most of the team excluding Kato, who wanted to save the little alien.
2	March 19, 2001	978-4-08-876139-8	October 1, 2008	978-1-59582-188-1
11. "No Survivors" (全員死亡, Zen'in Shibō); 12. "Hypnotism and Hallucination" (催眠と覚醒, Saimin to Kakusei); 13. "Eye" (眼, Me); 14. "Fearless" (怖いもの知らず, Kowaimono Shirazu); 15. "Jump or Die" (跳躍か死か, Chōyaku ka Shi ka); 16. "Metamorphosis of the Flesh" (肉体の変貌, Nikutai no Henbō); 17. "Fire" (発弾, Hatsudan); 18. "Conditions of Survival" (生還の条件, Seikan no Jōken); 19. "Gantz" (ガンツ, Gantsu); 20. "Scoring" (採点, Saiten); 21. "Clone" (コピー人間, Copī Ningen); 22. "Duplication" (重複, Chōfuku)
The tall alien attacks Kato, making him fall from a bridge and finds Kurono and Kishimoto. Both of them try to escape but as the alien focuses on Kurono, he ends up alone. Before the alien attacks, Kato appears and tries to protect Kurono but is mortally wounded. Kurono is enraged and the black suit he was given by Gantz gives him enough strength to immobilize the alien. After that another teenager named Joichiro Nishi, who was among the other people from the building, kills the alien. After the alien's death, the survivors return to the building. The ones who return are Kurono, Kishimoto, Nishi and Kato, whose injures are healed. The ones who returned are given points by Gantz based on the aliens they killed. Kurono asks Nishi for answers and he responds that these missions will happen several times and that many people have already died.
3	June 19, 2001	978-4-08-876163-3	January 21, 2009	978-1-59582-232-1
23. "Normality" (日常, Nichijō); 24. "Great Strength" (強力, Kyōryoku); 25. "Lucky Man" (ラッキーな男, Rakkī na Otoko); 26. "Dear Pet" (愛玩動物, Aigandōbutsu); 27. "Latent Ability" (潜在能力, Senzai Nōryoku); 28. "Returned" (再送, Saisō); 29. "Gang" (族, Zoku); 30. "Disappearance on the Road" (路上消失, Rojō Shōshitsu); 31. "Unexplainable, Inscrutable" (解説不可能意味不明, Kaisetsu Fukanō Imi Fumei); 32. "Forgotten Things" (忘れ物, Wasuremono); 33. "Group Madness" (集団狂気, Shūdan Kyōki); 34. "Tanaka" (田中さん, Tanaka-san)
After returning to her house, Kishimoto discovers that she is only a copy of herself and that her real self survived her suicide attempt. Having nowhere to go now—since her other self is living her life—she runs to Kurono's apartment to ask him if she can stay. Kato becomes angry while remembering how the little green alien died and attacks a bully from his school. During the following days, several people die and appear in the building in Tokyo along with the previous survivors. Kato tries to explain to them what is happening. A gangster tries to attack Nishi, but his suit protects him and he kills the gangster. As the people are transported to the city, Kurono realizes he forgot his black suit, having left it at his apartment. Unfortunately for him, he is the first to encounter the target alien named Mr. Tanaka, which has the appearance of a doll.
4	October 19, 2001	978-4-08-876217-3	April 8, 2009	978-1-59582-250-5
35. "Singing Voice" (歌声, Utagoe); 36. "Not What It Seems" (まやかしもの, Mayakashimono); 37. "Malfunction" (機能不全, Kinō Fuzen); 38. "Sacrifice" (いけにえ, Ikenie); 39. "Submerged Threat" (潜行の魔手, Senkō no Mashu); 40. "Ignored Warning" (警告無視, Keikoku Mushi); 41. "Bird" (鳥, Tori); 42. "Complicated Information" (情報錯綜, Jōhō Sakusō); 43. "An Unexpected Development" (予想外の展開, Yosōgai no Tenkai); 44. "Flock of Tanakas" (田中の群, Tanaka no Mure); 45. "Shudder" (ろりろり, Rori Rori); 46. "The Back Room" (アパートの奥, Apāto no Oku)
Nishi fights against Mr. Tanaka, but is badly injured when Tanaka shoots a type of sonic boom that explodes his eyes, ear drums and destroys his suit. Kato attempts to rescue him and bear hugs Tanaka. As a result, a dying bird emerges from within Tanaka and Kurono shoots it. Kato asks Nishi about how to escape the game, to which Nishi responds that one hundred points are required to exit the game, while he had ninety. Due to his severe injuries, Nishi dies while calling out to his mother. Despite the alien's death, the group is not transported like before, which leads them to suspect that there must be more aliens. Some people try to leave the area, but their heads explode when they step outside the designated boundary. As Kurono does not have his black suit to protect him, Kato tells him to stay away from the fights. However, Kurono is captured by two gangsters, who force him to enter a building that holds a multitude of Mr. Tanaka aliens. Kato, Kishimoto and a fashion model destroy several Tanakas from the city, but discover that several of their fellow fighters are dead.
5	February 19, 2002	978-4-08-876267-8	June 24, 2009	978-1-59582-301-4
47. "Resonance" (共鳴, Kyōmei); 48. "Boss" (親玉, Oyadama); 49. "Clever Strategy" (奇策, Kisaku); 50. "Collapse" (崩落, Hōraku); 51. "Capture" (捕獲, Hokaku); 52. "Weakness" (弱点, Jakuten); 53. "False Calm" (偽りの平穏, Itsuwari no Heion); 54. "Distrust, Discomfort" (不信不快, Fushin Fukai); 55. "The Emperor's New Clothes" (裸の王様, Hadaka no Ō-sama); 56. "New Participants" (新参者, Shinzanmono); 57. "Preacher" (説法者, Seppōsha); 58. "Despair" (絶望, Zetsubō)
Kurono confronts Mr. Tanaka's boss, a giant violet bird that attempts to kill him when Kurono accidentally steps on one of the little birds. Kurono fires his X-gun to the ground continuously to make the entire building collapse. Kurono manages to escape, but the boss survives. The giant bird boss attacks Kurono, who uses his X-gun to kill it. The survivors return to the Tokyo building and learn that, depending on how many aliens they kill, they will accumulate more points. In the following days, the surviving gangster attempts to kill other gangsters, but his head explodes as he reveals the gun from Gantz. Kurono and Kishimoto have an argument, as Kurono notes Kishimoto is in love with Kato and not him, and she leaves his apartment. Kato, who was living with his younger brother Ayumu in a house with their cruel adoptive mother, purchases a new apartment. Kato is later transported to the building along with the previous group of survivors.
6	May 17, 2002	978-4-08-876293-7	August 26, 2009	978-1-59582-320-5
59. "Sex" (セックス, Sekkusu); 60. "Guide" (案内人, Annainin); 61. "Gate" (門, Mon); 62. "Akimbo" (仁王立ち, Niōdachi); 63. "Palm" (掌, Tenohira); 64. "Angle of Attack" (突破口, Toppakō); 65. "Lack of Mercy" (慈悲欠落, Jihi Ketsuraku); 66. "Sensational Battle" (扇情の戦場, Senjō no Senjō); 67. "Slave of Destruction" (破壊の僕, Hakai no Shimobe); 68. "Descent into Heresy" (外道降臨, Gedō Kōrin); 69. "Cornered Rats" (窮鼠, Kyūso); 70. "Identifying with the Elite" (選民意識, Senmin Ishiki)
Back in the Gantz room, Kato tries to explain to the disbelieving newcomers about what they can expect to happen. A Buddhist priest convinces most of them that they have gone to the afterlife, and to ignore Kato. A new girl named Sei Sakuraoka, agrees to have sex with Kurono upon his request. The group is transported to a Buddhist temple, where they are supposed to kill two giant statues. The two statues start attacking the group and kill several people. Kurono fights back against the statues, defeating both. Just when the group feels safe again, another group of statues appears and confronts them. The new statues are mostly human-sized, with the exception of one giant Buddha statue.
7	September 19, 2002	978-4-08-876342-2	October 14, 2009	978-1-59582-373-1
71. "Even Buddha Loses Composure" (仏の顔も, Hotoke no Kao mo); 72. "Feast of Death" (死の大饗, Shi no Taikyō); 73. "Der Freischütz" (魔弾の射手, Madan no Shashu); 74. "Dramatic Kill" (劇殺, Gekisatsu); 75. "Limits" (限界, Genkai); 76. "Kiss of Death" (死の接吻, Shi no Seppun); 77. "Declaration of Love" (告白, Kokuhaku); 78. "Wail" (慟哭, Dōkoku); 79. "Resignation" (諦念, Teinen); 80. "Rupture" (破裂, Haretsu); 81. "Cold Words" (冷たい言葉, Tsumetai Kotoba); 82. "Do or Die Woman" (背水の女, Haisui no Onna)
The group divides; Kurono, Kato and Kishimoto fight some of the aliens outside and the others enter the Buddhist temple, where they fight a new group of statues/aliens, only to be killed by them. After defeating their opponents, Kato and the others enter the temple. One of the statues, which takes the form of a multiple-armed god, begins to throw acid at them, and Kishimoto dies while protecting Kato. Furiously, Kurono attacks the god, but it recovers and destroys one of Kurono's arms and one of his legs. Kato takes Kurono outside and tries to stop his bleeding. Kato then goes to seek out and destroy the remaining aliens; while he is away, the god statue finds Kurono and Sakuraoka tries to protect him.
8	January 17, 2003	978-4-08-876388-0	December 24, 2009	978-1-59582-383-0
83. "Powerless" (無力, Muryoku); 84. "Failed Sneak Attack" (奇襲失敗, Kishū Shippai); 85. "Human Words" (人語, Jingo); 86. "Communication" (コミュニケーション, Comyunikēshon); 87. "True Form" (本体, Hontai); 88. "Triumph of the Will" (意思の勝利, Ishi no Shōri); 89. "Brother" (弟, Otōto); 90. "Alone" (孤独, Kodoku); 91. "Pick Up?" (ナンパ?, Nanpa?); 92. "New Kids" (転校生, Tenkōsei); 93. "Room of the Black Sphere" (黒い球の部屋, Kuroi Tama no Heya); 94. "Kurono Kei" (くろのけい, Kurono Kei)
Sakuraoka is killed by the alien statue, which also kills all the other surviving members of the group except for Kato and the wounded Kurono. Kato decides to fight against the last alien and discovers that the statue has eaten the brain of one of his partners, which has given him the ability to speak as the dead teammate. Kato destroys its statue form; however, the alien then exits the statue body and takes a larger form. Once again, Kato destroys it, but he is killed at the same moment, leaving Kurono as the only survivor. Kurono reappears in the Tokyo tower uninjured and is overcome by depression as he realizes that he is alone. In the oncoming days, Kurono meets a new student from his school, Shion Izumi, who tells him that there is a website that contains information about Gantz. Kurono does not reveal his knowledge of Gantz, afraid that his head will explode. Later, Kurono is transported to the Tokyo building again, but this time he is the only one there.
9	May 19, 2003	978-4-08-876442-9	March 3, 2010	978-1-59582-452-3
95. "Long Jump" (幅跳び, Habatobi); 96. "Midair Action" (空中活劇, Kūchū Katsugeki); 97. "Pangs" (呵責, Kashaku); 98. "The Punching Bag" (嬲り者, Naburimono); 99. "Derangement" (錯乱, Sakuran); 100. "Time Limit" (タイムリミット, Taimu Rimitto); 101. "The Game of Life" (人生ゲーム, Jinsei Gēmu); 102. "Destruction of the Class" (学級崩壊, Gakkyū Hōkai); 103. "Ecstasy > Unease" (恍惚>不安, Kōkotsu>Fuan); 104. "Justice" (正義, Seigi); 105. "Final Prey" (最後の餌食, Saigo no Ejiki); 106. "Discovery of Existence" (存在の発覚, Sonzai no Hakkaku)
Kurono is transported to his solo mission upon a rooftop. He discovers his targets, the Shorty Aliens, which are a group of aliens the size of children. With this knowledge, he is able to destroy all but one when they jump after him. The surviving alien communicates with him using telepathic abilities and tells him that he already knows all his moves. The alien destroys Kurono's black suit, but Kurono escapes and hides until his time runs out. Gantz tells him he failed, and reduces his score to zero. The surviving alien is furious about the death of his partners and swears to kill Kurono. The next time Kurono goes to his school, the alien appears in the body of a student and kills all of Kurono's classmates with the exception of Izumi and a girl named Tae Kojima. Kurono decides to fight against him. At the same time, a large number of policemen enter the school to battle the alien.
10	August 19, 2003	978-4-08-876486-3	March 31, 2010	978-1-59582-459-2
107. "Annihilation" (殲滅, Senmetsu); 108. "The Days After" (なりゆき, Nariyuki); 109. "Candidate for Suicide" (自殺志願, Jisatsu Shigan); 110. "Paranormal" (超常現象, Chōjō Genshō); 111. "Master" (体得, Taitoku); 112. "Scene of Torture" (虐めの現場, Ijime no Genba); 113. "Murder" (殺人, Satsujin); 114. "Questioning" (訊問, Jinmon); 115. "Man from Hakata" (博多から来た男, Hakata kara Kita Otoko); 116. "World Championship" (世界戦, Sekaisen); 117. "Shadow Boss" (裏番, Uraban); 118. "Lover" (恋人, Koibito)
The Shorty Alien attacks a group of policemen, who are unable to stop it with bullets. Kurono sneaks up behind it and uses an X-gun to successfully kill it. In an attempt to keep the incident a secret, government officials tell Kurono to keep silent. Afterward, Kurono and Tae start going out together, with the former realizing that he not alone anymore. In the following days, a teenager named Hiroto Sakurai learns from a man, Kenzo Sakata, how to use psychic powers and uses them to kill bullies from his school. A giant man, Daizemon Kaze, starts searching the city for a strong person to fight to have a capable opponent. He fights Kurono, and Daizemon is ultimately defeated by the power of Kurono's suit.
11	December 18, 2003	978-4-08-876538-9	May 26, 2010	978-1-59582-518-6
119. "Late-Night Classroom" (真夜中の教室, Mayonaka no Kyōshitsu); 120. "Envy and Jealousy" (羨望と嫉妬, Senbō to Shitto); 121. "The Masked Man" (仮面の男, Kamen no Otoko); 122. "Morning of Crime" (犯行の朝, Hankō no Asa); 123. "Shinjuku, 10 AM" (新宿午前十時, Shinjuku Gozen Jūji); 124. "Massacre in Shinjuku" (新宿大虐殺, Shinjuku Daigyakusatsu); 125. "Pedestrian Paradise" (歩行者天国, Hokōsha Tengoku); 126. "Bare Hands" (徒手空拳, Toshu Kūken); 127. "The Man" (漢, Otoko); 128. "Atonement" (贖い, Aganai); 129. "Death of the Master" (師の死, Shi no Shi); 130. "Raging Death" (憤死, Funshi)
Izumi asks Kurono to meet him at the school and tells him that he was once a participant in the Gantz activities. He mentions that he recently received a small Gantz-style sphere with a message that instructed him to kill several people. Kurono is unable to shoot him and Izumi tells him he will do what Gantz has asked of him. The following Sunday, Izumi disguises himself as a black man, and begins massacring all of the pedestrians in Shinjuku with a bag of guns. Tae is in the middle of the attacks, but is saved by Daizemon Kaze. Daizemon tries to stop Izumi, but is killed after a long fight. Hiroto and Kenzo also try to stop him by blocking his bullets with their telekinetic abilities, but they die as well.
12	March 19, 2004	978-4-08-876578-5	July 28, 2010	978-1-59-582526-1
131. "Just Missed" (すれ違い, Surechigai); 132. "Confrontation" (対峙, Taiji); 133. "High Noon" (ハイヌーン, Hai Nūn); 134. "Seat of the Pants" (ぎりちょん, Girichon); 135. "New Rule" (新ルール, Shin Rūru); 136. "Jurassic" (ジュラシック, Jurashikku); 137. "Survival of the Fittest" (弱肉強食, Jakunikukyōshoku); 138. "Kansai" (カンサイ, Kansai); 139. "Sword" (剣, Ken); 140. "Split in Half" (両断, Ryōdan); 141. "Predation" (捕食, Hoshoku); 142. "Superman" (スーパーマン, Sūpāman)
Izumi kidnaps Kojima in an effort to lure Kurono into battle. Izumi dies in the duel and Kurono is mortally wounded. Both are transported to the Gantz room, along with a number of those killed by Izumi that day. Izumi punches Kurono unconscious before he can tell anyone what happened. When Kurono awakens, Izumi and most of the others have already been sent. Kurono is told by Gantz that he must get fifteen points to survive. He also finds a door that Izumi recently opened, and discovers vehicles, taking one with him on the mission. The mission's official target is the Kappe Alien, a deformed person that wears a large hat. Kurono is joined by an old man named Yoshikazu Suzuki and Reika, a famous and beautiful Japanese idol. Everybody is attacked by several alien dinosaurs, but most of the dinosaurs are killed by the combatants.
13	May 19, 2004	978-4-08-876608-9	September 29, 2010	978-1-59582-587-2
143. "Brave Papa" (父の背中, Chichi no Senaka); 144. "Howl" (咆哮, Hōkō); 145. "Cannibalism" (共食い, Tomogui); 146. "Lust for Life" (生きる力, Ikiru Chikara); 147. "The Odd Couple" (迷コンビ, Mei Konbi); 148. "Crash" (落車, Rakusha); 149. "Encouragement" (鼓舞, Kobu); 150. "Leader" (リーダー, Rīdā); 151. "Simultaneous Killings" (同時多殺, Dōji Tasatsu); 152. "Unavoidable" (回避不可能, Kaihi Fukanō); 153. "Decoy" (囮, Otori); 154. "Feelings" (情, Jō)
A dinosaur alien that Izumi was fighting escapes from the museum and attacks Reika. She manages to survive because of her suit. Kurono and Suzuki use the Gantz monowheel vehicle to attract the attention of the dinosaur and lead it away from the rest of the group. However, while they are leading it away Kurono falls from the back of bike where he was acting as gun-man. He is able to fight, and ultimately kill, the dinosaur. After that, all of the others who were sent by Gantz acknowledge Kurono as their leader. The group is surrounded by the Kappe Alien and a group of Velociraptors. The team separates and kills them all. However, a Brachiosauridae alien emerges, and appears to be furious about the death of the others. Kurono challenges the new dinosaur and lures it away.
14	July 16, 2004	978-4-08-876637-9	November 24, 2010	978-1-59582-598-8
155. "Dinosaur Parade" (恐竜大行進, Kyōryū Daikōshin); 156. "Surprise Attack" (不意打ち, Fuiuchi); 157. "One Hundred Eyes" (百眼, Hyaku Me); 158. "Black Clothes" (黒服, Kuro Fuku); 159. "Chance Meeting" (邂逅, Kaikō); 160. "The Only One" (唯一人, Tada Hitori); 161. "Reunion" (再会, Saikai); 162. "Lamp in Broad Daylight" (昼行灯, Hiru Andon); 163. "Seminar" (セミナー, Seminā); 164. "5:00 in Shibuya" (渋谷で5時, Shibuya de Goji); 165. "Whirlwind" (旋風, Senpū); 166. "Teeth" (歯, Ha)
With the help of Izumi, Kurono destroys the last dinosaur and the mission ends. While all the people from the mission are being transported, a group of swordsmen dressed in black begin attacking them. Most of participants are killed, but Suzuki is able to return. Upon returning to the Gantz room, scoring commences and Kurono's earns 58 points. After Kurono's performance in the last battle, most of the other surviving group members start training daily with Kurono to improve their own abilities. During the following days, Kurono's younger brother, Akira, learns that the people that attacked the Gantz group before are known as vampires, and that he is one of them. The vampires want to take revenge for all the deaths of other vampires by the hands of the people from Gantz. Some of them are able to find Izumi and try to capture him.
15	December 17, 2004	978-4-08-876717-8	January 5, 2011	978-1-59582-662-6
167. "Game of Death" (死亡遊戯, Shibō Yūgi); 168. "Telephone Shocker" (テレフォンショッキング, Terefon Shokkingu); 169. "Caught in the Middle" (狭間, Hazama); 170. "Breaking Up" (別離, Betsuri); 171. "Afterimage" (残像, Zanzō); 172. "Embrace" (抱擁, Hōyō); 173. "Transparent" (透明, Tōmei); 174. "Target" (標的, Hyōteki); 175. "Reunion" (再会, Saikai); 176. "Flee" (逃走, Tōsō); 177. "True Feelings" (真相吐露, Shinsō Toro); 178. "Schism" (分裂, Bunretsu)
Despite having the black costume broken, Izumi is able to kill the leader of the vampires he previously fought. In the following days, Kurono has a date with Reika and the event ends up being published in several popular celebrity magazines. Tae finds out about it and breaks up with Kurono. Soon Kurono and all the other members are transported by Gantz to kill aliens dressed as black knights. They manage a swift victory, but are then tasked by Gantz to kill Tae for unknown reasons. Kurono demands to be transported first and goes to her house so that he can protect her. All of the remaining members except Kenzo, Hiroto, Daizemon, Yoshikazu and Reika are intent on killing her.
16	April 19, 2005	978-4-08-876780-2	March 16, 2011	978-1-59582-663-3
179. "Trackless" (無軌道, Mukidō); 180. "Personal Attack" (対人攻撃, Taijin Kōgeki); 181. "Area" (エリア, Eria); 182. "Murderer" (人殺し, Hitogoroshi); 183. "Argentate Film" (銀鉛フィルム, Gin'en Firumu); 184. "Vanish" (消失, Shōshitsu); 185. "100 Point Menu" (100点めにゅ~, Hyakuten Menyū); 186. "Present" (プレゼント, Purezento); 187. "Investigation" (捜査, Sōsa); 188. "Punishment" (成敗, Seibai); 189. "Muscle Rider" (きんにくらいだー, Kinniku Raidā); 190. "Changing Clothes" (生着替え, Namakigae)
Izumi's team finds Tae after injuring all the people who aimed to protect her, and successfully kills her. Kurono attempts to commit suicide but he asks Gantz what will happen if he gets 100 points. He discovers that he can resurrect anybody who has participated in Gantz's missions and resolves to revive the friends he has lost, including Tae. In the following days, Sakurai, who still regrets killing the people who bullied him, uses his telekinesis to stop criminals. In the next mission, among the newcomers is a child named Takeshi who died as a result of parental abuse. He thinks that Daizemon is a hero that he used to admire before dying, and that he was meant to save him.
17	July 19, 2005	978-4-08-876826-7	May 18, 2011	978-1-59582-664-0
191. "Common Knowledge" (周知, Shūchi); 192. "In the Public Eye" (公衆の面前, Kōshū no Menzen); 193. "Out with the Demons" (オニは外, Oni wa Soto); 194. "City Battle" (市街戦, Shigaisen); 195. "Combustion" (燃焼系, Nenshōkei); 196. "Dislocation" (転位, Ten'i); 197. "Close Combat" (接近勝負, Sekkin Shōbu); 198. "Chicken" (チキン野郎, Chikin Yarō); 199. "Morphing" (不定形, Futeikei); 200. "Gulp" (ゴックン, Gokkun); 201. "Murder and Vomit" (殺人嘔吐, Satsujin Ōto); 202. "The Man Born from a Wish" (願いから生まれた男, Negai kara Umareta Otoko)
The group is sent to kill the Oni Aliens, which are creatures that are able to transform into anything. Takeshi is attacked by several of them but Daizemon is able to defeat them. Hiroto and Kenzo fight against one that is able to manipulate fire and, although the alien is killed, Hiroto is incinerated. Other aliens enter the bodies of several people and explode them from their insides. Ultimately, Kurono destroys all the aliens. Meanwhile, Daizemon manages to calm Takeshi by claiming that he is the hero that was created for Takeshi's protection.
18	November 18, 2005	978-4-08-876881-6	August 3, 2011	978-1-59582-776-0
203. "Fist" (ゲンコツ, Genkotsu); 204. "Swing Lock" (スイングロック, Suingu Rokku); 205. "Worthy Opponent" (好敵手, Kōtekishu); 206. "Before the Storm" (嵐の前, Arashi no Mae); 207. "Record of Bloodshed" (血風録, Keppūroku); 208. "God of Thunder" (カミナリサマ, Kaminari-sama); 209. "Human Extinction Declaration" (人類撲滅宣言, Jinrui Bokumetsu Sengen); 210. "Desperate Blow" (一撃必死, Ichigeki Hisshi); 211. "Within Reach" (見えているモノ, Miete Iru Mono); 212. "Impossible" (だめじゃん, Dame-jan); 213. "Attack from Above" (飛び斬り, Tobikiri); 214. "Synchronicity" (シンクロニシティ, Shinkuronishiti)
Daizemon faces an Oni Alien who is able to turn his body into rock. After a prolonged fight, Daizemon manages to kill the alien. A new lightning-wielding alien appears in Tokyo and starts killing people. Shion confronts it, but is unable to inflict any damage. However, he is saved by the remainder of his fellow hunters. They also attempt to fight it, but in the end are all defeated by the alien despite Kenzo managing to blind it. Kurono repeatedly fights against him, determined to achieve enough points to revive Tae. In the end he is tired but still wants to fight, and a weakened Shion arrives to help him.
19	June 19, 2006	978-4-08-877069-7	October 19, 2011	978-1-59582-813-2
215. "The Pathos of Rejoicing" (歓喜のパトス, Kanki no Patosu); 216. "100 Points..." (100点..., Hyakuten...); 217. "How to Use Freedom" (自由の使い方, Jiyū no Tsukai Kata); 218. "Comeback" (カムバック, Kamubakku); 219. "The Third Revived Person" (3人目の生還者, Sanninme no Seikansha); 220. "Number One" (いちばん, Ichiban); 221. "Good Work" (おつかれさま, Otsukaresama); 222. "Older and Younger Brother" (兄と弟, Ani to Otōto); 223. "Remains That Can't Be Erased" (消せない残滓, Kesenai Zanshi); 224. "Lovely Stalker" (ラブリーストーカー, Raburī Sutōkā); 225. "Key" (カギ, Kagi); 226. "Contact" (コンタクト, Kontakuto)
Kurono and Izumi kill the Oni Alien by beheading it and the hunters are transported back to the room to receive their scores. This time, most of them are able to achieve 100 points. Kenzo uses his points to revive Hiroto. Reika, Yoshikazu and Daizemon all decide to use their points to revive Tae, Kato and Nishi who are then able to assist the other participants. However, when Kurono is about to revive somebody else, his partners tell him to ask Gantz to choose the option that allows him to exit the battle cycle. He reluctantly follows their advice and is able to resume his usual life, with no memory of the Gantz activities. Since he remembers nothing, he also forgets that Tae was his girlfriend. This confuses him, since he still has her gifts and pictures. Kurono realizes that he lost his memory and attempts to recover it.
20	December 19, 2006	978-4-08-877187-8	December 21, 2011	978-1-59582-846-0
227. "Mystery Hunter" (ミステリーハンター, Misuterī Hantā); 228. "Dining Table of the Black Suits" (黒服の食卓, Kuro Fuku no Shokutaku); 229. "Leak" (流出, Ryūshutsu); 230. "Splitting Chinese Bamboo" (唐竹割り, Karatake Wari); 231. "Home Visit" (家庭訪問, Katei Hōmon); 232. "Altruistic Actions" (利他的行動, Ritateki Kōdō); 233. "Let's Go Somewhere" (一緒にどっか, Issho ni Dokka); 234. "Me, a Hero?" (英雄、俺?, Eiyū, Ore?); 235. "Junk Party" (ジャンクパーティー, Janku Pātī); 236. "Photosterilization" (光殺菌, Hikari Sakkin); 237. "...Next Phase" (...ネクストフェイズ, ...Nekusuto Feizu)
Kurono is asked by a detective named Seiichi Kikuchi about the "Gantz team". However, he is still unable to remember any of the events that occurred. The detective tries to interview the vampires but they force him to reveal information about the Gantz team instead. After that, the vampires confront Izumi, who they kill when he tries to protect his girlfriend. Akira calls Kurono and tells him that he is the next target of the vampires and also tells him that they are vulnerable to sunlight, which he uses to make weapons. That night, when he is attacked by the vampires who show him Akira's severed head. He attempts to confronts them, but is ultimately killed. Kato and his friends try to rescue him but they are attacked by two vampires in the process, and are transported by Gantz along with them.

=== Volumes 21–37 ===
No.	Original release date	Original ISBN	English release date	English ISBN
21	May 18, 2007	978-4-08-877276-9	February 22, 2012	978-1-59582-847-7
238. "Host Samurai" (ホストさむらい, Hosuto Samurai); 239. "Boss Ghoul" (ぬらりぴょん, Nuraripyon); 240. "Dotombori" (ドートンボリ, Dōtonbori); 241. "A Joyous Stench" (歓喜なる臭気, Kanki Naru Shūki); 242. "Wass Goin' On?" (なんやねん, Nan'yanen); 243. "West Side Story" (ウエストサイドストーリー, Uesuto Saido Sutōrī); 244. "The Land of Excess" (喰いだおれの街, Kuidaore no Machi); 245. "Last Piece of Strength" (強さのラストピース, Tsuyosa no Rasuto Pīsu); 246. "Hunters and the Hunted" (狩りと狩られ, Kari to Karare); 247. "Cheap Lives" (チープな命たち, Chīpu na Inochi-tachi)
Following Kurono's death, all of his former teammates are transported to the Gantz room. Kato is determined to achieve 100 points so that he can revive Kurono. This time, in addition to the previous survivors, two vampires that killed Kurono are also transported and are forced to aid them in the next mission. They are sent to Osaka for the mission instead of Tokyo. The team must destroy the yōkai aliens. Takeshi is the first one to be sent and accidentally kills some of them after becoming scared. The other members discover another Gantz team from Osaka, which tells them not to attack the aliens in their territory. Daizemon finds Takeshi and helps him to destroy other local aliens. Meanwhile, after discovering that the Osaka team has obtained 100 points several times, Kato is told that it is impossible to revive everyone and get out of the missions from Gantz.
22	November 19, 2007	978-4-08-877349-0	April 18, 2012	978-1-59582-848-4
248. "Prepare for the Nearest Death" (死捨悟入, Shisha Gonyū); 249. "Hypocrite Alien" (ギゼンシャ星人, Gizensha Seijin); 250. "The Three Super S's (Sadists)" (ドSの3人, Do S no Sannin); 251. "The Single-Minded Man" (ひたむきな男, Hitamuki na Otoko); 252. "The Group from the West" (西の人々, Nishi no Hitobito); 253. "Whatsitsname & So-and-So" (なにがしそれがし?, Nanigashi Soregashi?); 254. "A Single Finger" (指一本, Yubi Ippon); 255. "Do Whatever You Want" (勝手やネん, Katte Yanen); 256. "The Hundred-Point Alien" (100点のヤツ, Hyakuten no Yatsu)
Kato goes alone to fight the yōkai. He meets Anzu Yamasaki, a woman from the Osaka team, who tells him that in her team there were a couple and a child without suits to protect themselves. Kato and Anzu run to where they are and find them being attacked by a giant alien. Kato traps the alien in a small shop and kills him. At the same moment, the two vampires encounter a pair of samurai aliens and make an attempt to ally with them, but the aliens betray them. However, the blonde male vampire, nicknamed "Host Samurai" by Gantz, destroys them and rescues his female partner, Kill Bill. Meanwhile, two members from the Osaka team discover the strongest of the yōkai, the Nurarihyon, which is worth an entire hundred points alone. When Kato hears this, he becomes motivated to defeat it to receive the points needed to revive Kurono.
23	May 19, 2008	978-4-08-877445-9	June 20, 2012	978-1-59582-849-1
257. "Desperation" (やぶれかぶれ, Yabure Kabure); 258. "Splatterhead" (パチパチヘッド, Pachipachi Heddo); 259. "Half-Awakened" (半覚醒, Hankakusei); 260. "Vs. the SDF" (対自衛隊, Tai Jieitai); 261. "Annihilation vs. Extinction" (消滅と消失, Shōmetsu to Shōshitsu); 262. "Like a Cockroach" (ゴキブリなみ, Gokiburi nami); 263. "Impossible Death" (ありえない死, Arienai Shi); 264. "Mind Over Muscle" (柔よく剛を..., Jū Yoku Gō wo...)
A member of the Osaka team severs off the head from the 100-point Nurarihyon alien, but dies in the process. A fellow Osaka member is attacked by two other aliens resembling a tengu and an inugami and in a panic staves them off using leftover eye-beams from the 100-point alien. With the help of an invisible being he is able to escape but is surrounded by members of the Japanese military. Kato tries to defend him but they are attacked by the former two aliens. Three members of the Osaka team arrive and destroy the alien duo, although a team member dies in the process. After that, the 100-point alien reappears. Despite being destroyed several times, it resurrects into a new form each time and continues to fight.
24	October 17, 2008	978-4-08-877511-1	August 15, 2012	978-1-59582-907-8
265. "Feminine Hell" (女地獄, Onna Jigoku); 266. "Ambush" (伏兵の強襲, Fukuhei no Kyōshū); 267. "Forced to Compete" (進退の窮み, Shintai no Kiwami); 268. "The Ones Not Going Back" (還らぬ者, Kaeranumono); 269. "Survival of the Fittest" (究極の黒衣, Kyūkyoku no Kokui); 270. "Ping Pong" (ピンポン, Pin Pon); 271. "The Gap in Levels Between Him and Us" (断絶する彼我差, Danzetsu Suru Higa Sa); 272. "Oka Vs. Nurari, One-On-One!" (出口と糸口, Deguchi to Itoguchi)
The 100-point Nurarihyon alien transforms into a giant composed of women's bodies and proceeds to kill several of the Osaka combatants. Kato and the other members from the Tokyo team join the battle and try to destroy it as well. The alien once again transforms and becomes a giant minotaur, seriously injuring the Tokyo team. Kenzo decides to distract it while the others escape and dies in the process. The Nurarihyon continues to follow the Tokyo team but just when they are about to be killed, the last hunter from Osaka, Hachirou Oka, appears. He uses an improved version of the black suit to overpower the alien. The Nurarihyon again resurrects, this time in the form of an old man and continues fighting Oka. Oka is victorious, but he decides not to finish off the Nurarihyon, thinking he may die while doing it. The alien transforms into several balls and proceeds to attack the Tokyo squad.
25	February 19, 2009	978-4-08-877597-5	October 24, 2012	978-1-59582-908-5
273. "Roars of Terror" (恐怖の咆吼, Kyōfu no Hōkō); 274. "Melee Rush" (肉弾ラッシュ, Nikudan Rasshu); 275. "Regaining a Plan" (挽回の奇策, Bankai no Kisaku); 276. "Questioning the Question" (質問に質問, Shitsumon ni Shitsumon); 277. "The Marksman" (光からの奇襲, Hikari kara no Kishū); 278. "Once in a Lifetime Rush" (闇からの強襲, Yami kara no Kyōshū); 279. "Revival" (リバイバル, Ribaibaru); 280. "Prelude to Collapse" (カタストロフィの序曲, Katasutorofi no Jokyoku)
The previous attack from the Nurarihyon leaves Takeshi seriously injured, and Daizemon decides to fight the alien to let Takeshi return to Gantz's room safe. The Nurarihyon takes the form of a skeleton and fights Daizemon. As Daizemon is left wounded, the alien leaves to find and kill Oka. Unwilling to give up, Kato asks his comrades to attack the alien while he will be a bait. As the Nurarihyon returns with Oka's corpse, all the hunters shoot in order to defeat it. However, the alien manages to defend and cuts Kato's legs. Before Kato is killed, Anzu protects him, dying in the process. Host Samurai fights the Nurarihyon, allowing Kato to kill the alien. With the mission over, the surviving Tokyo members return to Tokyo, where Kato receives 100 points from Gantz. Kato decides to revive Kurono, who appears without remembering what happened after he chose to leave the room. Meanwhile, Nishi tells the team that nothing matters now as, according to Gantz, all of mankind will be destroyed in a week due to a possible new nuclear war.
26	June 19, 2009	978-4-08-877668-2	January 23, 2013	978-1-61655-048-6
281. "Warm Memories" (ぬくもりの記憶, Nukumori no Kioku); 282. "Proud Primates" (驕れる霊長類, Ogoreru Reichōrui); 283. "Desperate Meeting" (絶望ミーティング, Zetsubō Mītingu); 284. "Factory" (工場, Kōjō); 285. "The Link Between Mind and Sphere" (繋がる終焉, Tsunagaru Shūen); 286. "Distorted Feelings" (歪む想い, Yugamu Omoi); 287. "Definition of Bullying" (いじめの定義, Ijime no Teigi); 288. "The Roar of Collapse" (終末の破砕音, Shūmatsu no Hasai On); 289. "The World Attacks" (強襲する世界, Kyōshū Suru Sekai); 290. "Intelligence Like That of a Straw" (藁のような叡智, Wara no Yōna Eichi); 291. "Wisdom of Beauty" (反逆する美なる偶像, Hangyaku Suru Bi naru Gūzō)
The members from the Tokyo team return to their common lives, but they remain concerned about Nishi's comment about the world's destruction. The members reunite once again, and ask Nishi to tell them about Gantz. Nishi tells them that there are various Gantz teams all around the world and that it is suspected that the aliens and the black spheres were made by men. Meanwhile, Kikuchi goes to Germany, where with the help from a person named Sebastian, he finds a factory of black spheres. Reika goes to Kurono's apartment and confesses her feelings to him, but Kurono tells her he is in love with Tae. As she leaves the apartment, Reika decides to get 100 points to revive Kurono once again so that the new one would love her. As Nishi returns to his school, he is attacked by the other students who have grown a dislike for him. Enraged, Nishi kills most of them, forcing several soldiers to attack him. Before being killed, Nishi is transported to Gantz's room along with all the members from the Tokyo team. The team is then transported to Italy where they find that all the Gantz's participants from the city are being killed by Roman statue aliens.
27	October 19, 2009	978-4-08-877721-4	April 17, 2013	978-1-61655-049-3
292. "International Tragedy" (多国籍惨劇, Takokuseki Sangeki); 293. "The Price of Courage" (勇気の対価, Yūki no Taika); 294. "Shutdown" (シャットダウン, Shattodaun); 295. "Colony Collapse Disorder" (蜂群崩壊症候群, Hōgun Hōkai Shōkōgun); 296. "The Meaning of Finished" (終わりの意味, Owari no Imi); 297. "Stirrings Within the Black Sphere" (黒球の中の胎動, Kuro Tama no Naka no Taidō); 298. "Warped Providence and Love" (歪む摂理と恋心, Yugamu Setsuri to Koigokoro); 299. "How to Make an Eternity" (永遠のつくりかた, Eien no Tsukurikata); 300. "Sage of the Book of Darkness" (闇の帳の老賢者, Yami no Tobari no Rōkenja); 301. "Things Come to Light in the Mansion" (館の中の白日, Yakata no Naka no Hakujitsu); 302. "The Berlin Trickster" (伯林のトリックスター, Berurin no Torikkusutā); 303. "Daylight of Destruction" (破滅のデイライト, Hametsu no Deiraito)
Participant Kouki Inaba gives up while confronting the aliens and Suzuki is killed by them when he tries to protect Inaba. Realizing that Suzuki cared for him, Inaba starts fighting to survive the mission, but is killed by an enormous statue. When the Tokyo team is overpowered by the aliens, Gantz transports them back to Tokyo, where the sphere announces that the mission has ended. As most participants leave, Reika finds that the person from the sphere is out and asks her who she wants to revive. Reika chooses to create a clone of Kurono, who decides to stay with her when he realizes he is a clone and cannot continue being with Tae. Sometime later, Sebastian takes Kikuchi to Germany where Sebastian discovers that a group of men created Gantz using a coded message transmitted by an ill person. Kikuchi grows suspicious of Sebastian. The next day, the sky becomes red, and an unknown black ship destroys North America's military force.
28	May 19, 2010	978-4-08-877854-9	July 24, 2013	978-1-61655-050-9
304. "Shooting Stars" (シューティングスター, Shūtingu Sutā); 305. "Rejected Surrender" (降伏却下, Kōfuku Kyakka); 306. "Tokyo Eliminator" (トーキョー・エリミネーター, Tōkyō Eriminētā); 307. "Giga Structure" (ギガ・ストラクチャー, Giga Sutorakuchā); 308. "Collision with the Unknown" (未知との激突, Michi to no Gekitotsu); 309. "Deciding to Open Fire" (決意の火蓋, Ketsui no Hibuta); 310. "People Saved, Things Wasted" (救えた者と零した物, Sukuetamono to Koboshitamono); 311. "Stealth Hope" (ステルスの希望, Suterusu no Kibō)
Giant beings resembling the black outfits appear in Japan and start slaughtering the citizens. When Kurono decides to battle them, he discovers they are humanoid aliens. The other Tokyo hunters also battle them, managing to protect various people. As Reika and Kurono's clone also fight the alien, they are supported by other hunters who proceed to unarm and capture them.
29	September 17, 2010	978-4-08-879025-1	October 23, 2013	978-1-61655-150-6
312. "The Counterattack Begins" (逆襲の執行, Gyakushū no Shikkō); 313. "Loss of Control" (制御の消失, Seigyo no Shōshitsu); 314. "Agitation" (アジテーション, Ajitēshon); 315. "Clash of Civilizations" (文明の衝突, Bunmei no Shōtotsu); 316. "Twist and Turn" (ツイスト アンド ターン, Tsuisuto ando Tān); 317. "Superiority Moments" (刹那の優勢, Setsuna no Yūsei); 318. "Hectic Chase for Safety" (猛追する安否, Mōtsui Suru Anpi); 319. "Teared Life" (剥がされる命, Hagasareru Inochi)
When trying to protect Tae and his schoolmates, Kurono is transported to an area along with various hunters from different cities. They are ordered by a group of hunters controlling black spheres to go fight on the alien ship, threatening to kill them if they disobey. In the ship, the hunters battle the humanoid aliens until they are able to secure one and transport it back to land. The lead hunters send the other hunters including Kurono back to different cities at random, but as Kurono runs to find Tae, she is kidnapped alongside various humans by an alien ship.
30	January 19, 2011	978-4-08-879088-6	January 29, 2014	978-1-61655-151-3
320. "Signal of Death" (断末の合図, Danmatsu no Aizu); 321. "Perverted Salvation" (変質する救済, Henshitsu Suru Kyūsai); 322. "The Very Bottom of the Chain" (連鎖の最底辺, Rensa no Saiteihen); 323. "Depths of the Alien World" (異界の深奥, Ikai no Shin'ō); 324. "The Choice of Those with Power" (力有る者の選択, Chikara Arumono no Sentaku); 325. "Exposed Reunion" (展示された再会, Tenjisareta Saikai); 326. "Toy Girl" (玩具少女, Gangu Shōjo)
As they enter the alien ship, most humans are killed by the machines in there. Tae and other humans manage to escape and appear in an alien city where the giant humanoid aliens live and humans are used as food. As aliens continue killing the humans, Tae is taken by a child alien. Kurono arrives to the ship, desperate to find Tae, but decides to help the surviving humans escape from the area after they plead.
31	April 19, 2011	978-4-08-879129-6	April 23, 2014	978-1-61655-152-0
327. "Innocence in a Palanquin" (駕籠の中の純情, Kago no Naka no Junjō); 328. "Transcendence" (超越, Chōetsu); 329. "Rebellious Gathering" (叛意の集結, Han'i no Shūketsu); 330. "The Outbreak of War Begins" (開戦の開始, Kaisen no Kaishi); 331. "Reversible Invasion" (可逆なる侵略, Kagyaku Naru Shinryaku); 332. "The Wills Are Piling Up" (集積する意志たち, Shūseki Suru Ishi-tachi); 333. "Extreme Ways" (極限の仕様, Kyokugen no Shiyō); 334. "Irreversible Lives" (非可逆生命, Hikagyaku Seimei); 335. "Mismatched Rescue" (すれ違う救済, Surechigau Kyūsai)
After finding his girlfriend killed by the aliens, Sakurai grows furious and starts killing all the aliens in the area. Meanwhile, the Tokyo hunters reunite and make the humanoid inside the black sphere use the sphere for them. The Kurono revived by Reika then sends a message to hunters across Japan seeking their help in rescuing the people taken by the alien's spaceship. As various hunters start arriving, the other Kurono takes an alien hostage so that she will guide him and the humans he found outside the ship. Learning that they cannot revive people anymore, the hunters recruited in Tokyo transfer to the spaceship to save the people in danger.
32	August 19, 2011	978-4-08-879185-2	July 23, 2014	978-1-61655-428-6
336. "Quality and Quantity of Life" (命の質と数, Inochi no Shitsu to Kazu); 337. "Peace and Cornering" (和平と背水, Wahei to Haisui); 338. "Hopes United" (迎撃と光明, Geigeki to Kōmyō); 339. "The Beginning of the Chain" (連鎖の始まり, Rensa no Hajimari); 340. "Reversal of Fortune" (反転する渇望, Hanten Suru Katsubō); 341. "Exploding Respite" (爆裂する安息, Bakuretsu Suru Ansoku); 342. "Resuscitation Failure" (再生破綻, Saisei Hatan); 343. "The Pen of Fishing Lures" (疑似餌の囲い, Gijie no Kakoi)
The Tokyo hunters start transporting the hostages back to Tokyo with the black sphere. However, the aliens in charge of the ship view them as terrorists and start sending creatures to eliminate them. Moreover, the black sphere from Tokyo is then hacked, and the hunters cannot transfer anymore. Gantz's room is then attacked by aliens, and while Nishi and Takeshi manage to escape safely, the humanoid from the sphere dies. Now in the aliens' city, the hunters try evacuating the humans but are confronted by more enemies.
33	January 19, 2012	978-4-08-879255-2	October 22, 2014	978-1-61655-429-3
344. "A Game of Life and Death" (生殺遊戯, Seisatsu Yūgi); 345. "Reactive Resignation" (攻性の諦観, Kōsei no Teikan); 346. "Quenched Combustion" (消費される燃焼, Shōhi Sareru Nenshō); 347. "Saturated Skull" (飽和する頭蓋, Hōwa Suru Zugai); 348. "Rampaging Tumor" (暴走する腫瘍, Bōsō Suru Shuyō); 349. "Less Than a Fight" (闘争未満, Tōsō Miman); 350. "Pinpoint Victory" (針ほどの活路, Hari Hodo no Katsuro); 351. "Beautiful Feelings" (美しき感情, Utsukushiki Kanjō)
The Tokyo hunters continue being attacked by a diverse amount of creatures that reduce their numbers as well as the people captured. The remaining Osaka team members try to protect the humans captured but are overwhelmed by the aliens. Now having nearly ten members alive, the Tokyo hunters manage to help the Osaka hunters. Back in the ship's city, Kurono is able to find Tae with help from the alien he took hostage.
34	May 10, 2012	978-4-08-879328-3	February 4, 2015	978-1-61655-573-3
352. "Lovers Crossing" (逢瀬の交差, Ōse no Kōsa); 353. "Deus Ex Machina" (機械仕掛けの神, Kikai Jikake no Kami); 354. "I, Too" (俺だッて, Oreda tte); 355. "Parallel Strike" (強襲する平行, Kyōshū Suru Heikō); 356. "A Forbidden Dream" (禁忌の夢, Kinki no Yume); 357. "Tiny Love Song" (小さな恋のメロディ, Chīsana Koi no Merodi); 358. "Steel March" (鋼鉄マーチ, Kōtetsu Māchi); 359. "The Squinting Tyrant" (やぶにらみの暴君, Yabu Nirami no Bōkun)
Without warning, Kurono is put in a superpowered machine and sent to destroy a tower that supports the alien ship. After killing almost all the aliens in the building, the Tokyo and Osaka teams leave with the second Kurono staying behind to kill the last alien. Reika refuses to leave and sacrifices her life to save the second Kurono.
35	October 19, 2012	978-4-08-879438-9	April 22, 2015	978-1-61655-586-3
360. "Confession and Repentance" (告白と懺悔, Kokuhaku to Zange); 361. "Battlecry" (戦線叫叫, Sensen Kyōkyō); 362. "Meager Redemption" (儚い贖い, Hakanai Aganai); 363. "Sky Tower" (空の塔, Sora no Tō); 364. "Dissonant Resonance" (不協和の共鳴, Fu Kyōwa no Kyōmei); 365. "Deal with the Devil" (外道ネゴシエイション, Gedō Negoshieishon); 366. "The Great Escape" (ザ・グレイト・エスケープ, Za Gureito Esukēpu); 367. "How to Make a Hero" (英雄の作り方, Eiyū no Tsukurikata)
Sakurai starts to use telekinesis to destroy the machines in sight, but is distracted by hallucinations of Kenzo and Tonkotsu. After the hallucinations end, Hiroto is killed by an incoming electrical-powered laser. When Kurono reaches the tower, he rescues Tae when the miniship of the alien who saved her is shot down, and the alien sacrifices herself. He then confronts Nishi, who wants to destroy the aliens for good. Kurono has second thoughts about killing the entire alien population, after being convinced by Tae that they are not eradicating Earth for their liking. After a brief argument, Nishi attempts to kill Tae, but Kurono manages to escape with Tae and leaves Nishi to die in the chaos below the tower. Soon, both Kurono and Tae find out that they are in space, and with a shuttle, immediately headed back to Earth. Meanwhile, the rest of the team is transported to a headquarters in space, where some of them abuse the aliens endlessly.
36	March 19, 2013	978-4-08-879588-1	July 22, 2015	978-1-61655-587-0
368. "Transgression and a Profession of Love" (蹂躙と告白, Jūrin to Kokuhaku); 369. "Question Time" (クエスチョンタイム, Kuesuchon Taimu); 370. "Perfect Plan" (パーフェクトプラン, Pāfekuto Puran); 371. "Proof of Humanity" (人間の証明, Ningen no Shōmei); 372. "Where the Missing Mass Goes" (その質量の行方, Sono Shitsuryō no Yukue); 373. "Dueling Etiquette" (決闘作法, Kettō Sahō); 374. "Rush Hour" (ラッシュアワー, Rasshu Awā); 375. "The Final Barrier" (最後の障壁, Saigo no Shōheki)
Shortly afterwards, the members of Gantz are transported into a room with a divine figure who appears to have omniscience. The figure explains that the aliens the Gantz teams fought were immigrants from a dying solar system. It also explain that it was responsible for sending the Gantz technology to Earth, and did so after Earth was the next world in line to be attacked by the final aliens encountered in the series. Though thanked by the teams, the figure clarifies that it sent the technology out of a perceived obligation to "restore order to the Earth itself" rather than to save humanity, and that humanity is extremely arrogant for its status akin to dust in the grand scheme of the universe. After being teased by revived lovers and friends of the past that the divine figure conjures, the clone Kurono manages to get himself obliterated trying to kill the figure. The team ends up being transported back to the alien ship, where they discovered that they incapacitated almost all of the aliens and are at the verge of winning the war.
37	August 19, 2013	978-4-08-879627-7	October 28, 2015	978-1-61655-588-7
376. "A Challenge from the Defeated" (敗残者の挑戦状, Haizan-sha no Chōsen-jō); 377. "The Melancholy of Prometheus" (プロメテウスの憂鬱, Purometeusu no Yūutsu); 378. "Confronting His Heaviest Burden" (最大荷重の対峙, Saidai Kajū no Taiji); 379. "Exchanging Despair for Hope" (希望と絶望の応酬, Kibō to Zetsubō no Ōshū); 380. "Flashing All His Might" (渾身の一閃, Konshin no Issen); 381. "Converging on Despair" (収束する諦観, Shūsoku suru Teikan); 382. "Lightning Counterstrike" (迅雷の交錯, Jinrai no Kōsaku); 383. "End Point" (最期の終止符, Saigo no Shūshifu)
The hunters struggle to defeat the strongest alien, Eeva Gund, with many casualties before Kurono flies straight into Eeva's head, killing him. As Kurono tries to convince the last alien to stop fighting the humans, the alien commits suicide, and the entire alien ship is set to self-destruct. Most humans safely transport themselves back onto Earth, with the exception of Kurono and Kato and some leftover Gantz members. The duo escape the ship before it explodes using the flying Gantz bikes, and fall into the ocean, experiencing hypothermia and starvation before military personnel arrive. Kurono and Kato manage to get out of the water, and are greeted by Tae, Kato's brother Ayumu and a host of onlookers as the war officially ends.

== See also ==
- List of Gantz episodes
- List of Gantz characters
