= List of Gantz characters =

Several characters wearing the black suits, including Nishi, Kurono, Kato and Kishimoto.

The anime and manga series Gantz features a large number of fictional characters created by Hiroya Oku. The series takes place in a modern Japan, in which several creatures known as aliens start attacking citizens.

The series starts with the teenager Kei Kurono, who dies in a train accident along with his childhood friend Masaru Kato. Suddenly, they appear in an apartment from Tokyo along with several people who have recently died. A black sphere named Gantz revives them and then it sends them messages, telling them they have to kill aliens if they want to live. All the participants are given powerful weapons such as guns, and black bodysuits that increase their strength. As the characters participate in the game, they start discovering more things related to Gantz such as what happens when they defeat several aliens, and why Gantz holds the game.

Names are in Western order, with the given name before the surname (family name).

== Creation and conception ==
When creating the chapters from the manga, the author Hiroya Oku first makes a draft of the pages. He then creates 3D models of the characters and backgrounds on his computers. Once done, Oku scans the characters draws he made in the 3D models, and the backgrounds are reduced to lines. Finally, he then adds tone to the pages and colors them, and starts adding sound effects as well as dialogues.

== Central characters ==
=== Kei Kurono ===
Kei Kurono (玄野 計, Kurono Kei) is one of the two main protagonists of the series. Kei is a 10th grader who is summoned by Gantz, along with his childhood friend Masaru Kato, after being hit by a subway train in an effort to help a hobo who passes out on the tracks. In the beginning, he is a rather selfish character, with a penchant for sexual perversity, who often ends up being the reluctant hero. However, after Kato dies in the third mission, Kei starts taking care of other people as well, and he starts to avoid casualties amongst Gantz team members. His innate skills and physical prowess eventually make him a hero to most of the other members. During missions, Kei often uses unconventional tactics to great effect. He lives alone in an apartment complex, as he was not on good terms with his family. After reviving some of his former friends, Kei leaves the game due to a request from his comrades. The vampires group searches and eventually finds Kei, killing him. After the first mission of Phase 2, he is revived by Masaru Kato but remembers nothing beyond his choice to leave after the Oni Mission. After the failed Italian mission, Gantz revives an additional copy of Kurono at Reika's request, unknown to the others. After meeting the original Kurono, he decides to live with Reika. Oku developed Kurono's character with the idea that the readers from the manga could identify themselves with him. However, he was also created to "make a synthesis of the basic conditions for a work of entertainment". His Japanese voice actors are Daisuke Namikawa in the anime and Yuki Kaji in Gantz: O. His English voice actor is Christopher Ayres and Lucien Dodge in Gantz: O. His live-action actor is Kazunari Ninomiya.

=== Masaru Kato ===
Masaru Kato (加藤 勝, Katō Masaru) is one of the two main protagonists of the series. He is summoned, along with Kurono, by Gantz after they were hit by a subway train while helping an unconscious hobo who fell on the tracks. He is a childhood friend of Kurono and serves as a secondary protagonist. At school, he acts as a guardian to the weaker students who often find themselves bullied, getting himself a bit of a reputation for fighting. He initially lives with an aunt who reluctantly adopted him and his brother after they were orphaned. They leave after Kato saved enough money to rent an apartment room for both of them; in the anime version, they moved after he could no longer stand their aunt hitting his little brother. He is killed during the Thousand Arms mission. He is later revived near the end of Phase 1 by Yoshikazu Suzuki who asked Kurono who he wanted to revive. After that, he manages to kill Nurarihyon and gains 100 points, choosing to revive Kurono. In the Japanese series, Kato is voiced by Masashi Oosato and by Daisuke Ono in Gantz: O. In the anime English dub is voiced by Illich Guardiola. In the live-action movie, Kato is played by Ken'ichi Matsuyama.

=== Tae Kojima ===
Tae Kojima (小島 多恵, Kojima Tae) is Kurono's first actual girlfriend, first dated on a dare. He actually falls in love with her, and they build a real relationship, Kurono appearing to be very protective of her. After taking pictures of the Game's participants during their mission, she immediately becomes the next target (considering Gantz wants to remain unknown to outsiders). To end the mission and preserve his points, Shion Izumi takes the pleasure of murdering Tae (while Kei and Reika want to deliberately fail the mission by protecting her life), but Reika later on brings her back to life. Similar to Kurono, she also realizes parts of her memory were missing, as hinted by pictures of her with Kurono and her paintings of him. Much of Phase 3 involves Kurono trying to rescue her from the giants.

== Supporting characters ==
=== Shion Izumi ===
Shion Izumi (和泉 紫音, Izumi Shion) is a former participant of Gantz's missions. He achieved 100 points, and left the game with his memories erased. Since then, he began to remember the excitement of the missions. Despite his popularity in school, Izumi becomes jealous of Kei Kurono, as he wants to return to Gantz. In an effort to return to Gantz, he commits a mass shooting on a busy street disguised as a black man, killing or injuring 387 before being stopped by Kurono. Before dying, Izumi is transported to Gantz's room and is allowed to participate in more missions. Izumi possesses tremendous fighting skills and, aside from Kei Kurono, proves stronger than any other member on the team. He shows very little regard to ethics and cared only about the missions and reaching the goals. He is ambushed by the vampires near the end of Phase 1 and is able to kill all of them. The four vampire leaders then decide to kill him themselves. Izumi still manage to kill three of them but is killed by the sole remaining vampire while protecting his girlfriend.

=== Joichiro Nishi ===
Joichiro Nishi (西 丈一郎, Nishi Joichiro) is a middle-school student introduced in the first mission of the series. A violent psychopath, he is a veteran of the Gantz world, having arrived there over a year before the beginning of the series. His mother killed herself and after coming home from school he found her body, the next day he ran away from home and jumped off the top of his schools roof and killed himself. When he first introduced, Nishi was similar to how Kurono started out, he is also selfish and has a social Darwinist approach to life. Nishi is reluctant to reveal anything about the Gantz or himself, but he runs a website where he posts information about it (carefully avoiding Gantz's rule about informing outsiders, which would in turn prove fatal). Gantz calls him "Mr. Nishi", which is rather interesting given how informally or derisively he refers to most of the other participants. Nishi is killed at the beginning of the Tanaka/Suzuki Alien mission, but after six months of existing only inside Gantz's memory banks, he is revived by Kaze at Kurono's request following the end of the Oni mission. Ostensibly, Kurono hopes that Nishi will be able to provide information about Gantz to the game players. After being ostracized and bullied by his classmates, which ended with them hurling him out of the classroom window, he has killed all of them (except one girl who had a crush on him and did not support the rest in wanting to chase him out of the school). After this, civil armed forces are sent to kill Nishi. Nishi manages to kill many of the men sent to kill him, but after an intense battle with the armed forces he is severely wounded and was only able to avoid death because Gantz called the Hunters for a new mission. Masashi Yabe voices him in the Japanese series and Tomohiro Kaku in Gantz: O. Chris Patton voices him in the English dub. Kanata Hongo plays him in the live-action movie.

=== Kei Kishimoto ===
Kei Kishimoto (岸本 恵, Kishimoto Kei) first appears naked in the Apartment as her death involved slitting her wrists while in a bathtub. Unlike many of the characters of the series, she did not exactly die. As Nishi revealed, Gantz can make mistakes. Gantz accidentally created a copy of Kishimoto to use in missions while her original self survived. Kurono has a deep crush on her, but she herself has a crush on Masaru Kato. Finding her 'real self' alive, she is forced to live with Kurono who is delighted to see her at first but later resents being used by her as she is clearly not interested in him. Gantz calls her by the names "Boiled eggs", "Titz" and "Miss Melons" (in the original Japanese: "Kyonyū" (巨乳, "huge breasts")) due to her fairly large breasts. She dies during the Buddha mission to protect Kato from the acid attack of the boss alien, Thousand Arms. She was later brought back to life and was reunited with Kato. However, the divine being quickly killed her again to show the futility of human existence. Her Japanese voice actress is Hitomi Nabatame, and her English voice actress Shannon Emerick. Her live-action actress is Natsuna Watanabe.

=== Yoshikazu Suzuki ===
Yoshikazu Suzuki (鈴木 良一, Suzuki Yoshikazu), best known as "Old Man" (おっちゃん, Otchan). Not much is known about him except that he is a fairly old widower who has a grandson. Surprisingly, it does not take long for Kurono to grow attached to him and vice versa. He sees Kurono as a role model, and even gives his 100 points to revive his friend Masaru Kato so that Kei may leave the game. He sees Kurono as the world's hope for "survival". He has saved Kei's life multiple times and he emulates Kei. After Kei dies however, it seems as if his morale lowers and he sides with the majority on not trying to help others because it was too dangerous. During the mission in Italy, he is killed by dismemberment while protecting Inaba from a group of new powerful enemies. He was later brought back to life by the divine being only to be reduced to a pile of blood and organs to show the futility of human life.

=== Hiroto Sakurai ===
Hiroto Sakurai (桜井 弘斗, Sakurai Hiroto) is a psychic who receives instructions on how to unlock his latent powers from Sakata after attempting suicide. He is then encouraged by Sakata to kill his bullies who sexually abused him with the use of his powers, which he does. However, he later regrets it, realizing how it feels to be a murderer. When he and Sakata witness Izumi's Shinjuku massacre, he insists in trying to stop Izumi and convinces Sakata to join him, arguing that it is a good opportunity to redeem themselves for the murders they committed themselves. While they do put up a good fight, Izumi still does manage to kill both, leading them to Gantz. A phenomenal learner, he masters his abilities rather quickly. He dies in the fight against the Flame Oni, but is revived by Sakata. Gantz calls him "Cherry", taken from the Japanese sakura and which is his online handle. He has a girlfriend named Tonkotsu who he first met after he murdered the people who abused him. With her, he is seen trying to catch murderers using his psychic powers, in order to further redeem himself. After the mission in Osaka, Gantz names him "no longer a Cherry (Cherry is also the way Japanese address a virgin boy. No longer a Cherry in this term means that he is no longer a virgin)". During the alien invasion, Tonkotsu is killed, leading to Sakurai going on a psychotic mass murder spree against the aliens. He even went as far as to murder innocent aliens as well. He eventually died from his injuries.

=== Kenzo Sakata ===
Kenzo Sakata (坂田 研三, Sakata Kenzō) is another psychic. He teaches Hiroto Sakurai to use his latent psychic powers, thus Sakurai refers to him as "master". He and Sakurai die while trying to stop Izumi's massacre in Shinjuku, leading to his arrival to Gantz. He seems to have an unorthodox view on people's lives; he tells Sakurai that he was like him once and that he himself has killed, and encourages his pupil to kill those bullying him. Gantz calls him "Stupid Newb" and "Dumbass". His psychic powers are significantly reduced, and a recent medical examination indicates that continued use of his powers has significantly aged his internal organs. After the Oni mission he uses his 100 points to revive Sakurai. In the Osaka mission however, he says that they should forget about the dead and that by bringing them back it "cheapens" their lives. He is killed in the battle of Nurarihyon by holding off the 100-point alien while the rest of the Tokyo team escapes.

=== Reika Shimohira ===
Reika Shimohira (下平 玲花, Shimohira Reika) is a beautiful, young and popular idol. Like almost everyone else who arrives at the dinosaur alien mission, she is caught in the line of fire during Izumi's killing spree in Shinjuku. She develops a crush on Kurono after seeing him in action. Surprisingly enough, she proves to be a formidable opponent against the Aliens. She uses her points to resurrect Tae because she wants Kurono to be happy. It is not until Kurono chooses to be free that she confesses her love to him. After Kurono departs from the game, she is appointed the new team leader of Gantz. After Kurono is revived, Reika confesses her feelings to him, but Kurono, having rekindled his relationship with Tae, rebuffs her. Distraught over Kurono's choice, Reika suffers an apparent mental break, and resolves to earn 100 points to revive a new Kurono for herself. She succeeds in reviving a second Kurono who exists concurrently with the copy brought back straight from the Oni mission end transfer. The second Kurono now lives with Reika and she seems to quit her job to be with him, even going as far as to mention changing her name to "Reika Kurono". However, she died during the last mission when she wanted to protect the second Kurono. She was soon brought back and subsequently killed again by the divine being to show the others the futility of human existence. However, the being also states that she will eventually be reincarnated, with the clones of Kurono and Kishimoto eventually becoming her children.

=== Daizaemon Kaze ===
Daizaemon Kaze (風 大左衛門, Kaze Daizaemon) is a tall and incredibly powerful martial artist who comes from the countryside to Tokyo looking for a good fight. He first meets Gantz after the Shinjuku massacre, where he makes a valiant yet doomed attempt at stopping Izumi. He seems to care about Takeshi, a young child who admires Kaze as his "Muscle Rider" savior. After the Oni Aliens mission he collects slightly over 100 points, but chooses to remain in the Gantz game in order to both continue testing his strength and fighting skills against more powerful enemies and to protect Takeshi. So instead of being freed he chooses to revive another person, settling on Nishi after asking for Kurono's suggestion. Despite his cold outlook, he does have a softer side—in fact, he weeps when he thinks of how Takeshi died at such a young age without ever having experienced love. He also takes some sport in the game, though nowhere near as much as Izumi. He is the only team member who does not use weapons, relying on nothing but the Gantz suit which amplifies his already incredible strength.

=== Takeshi Koumoto ===
Takeshi Koumoto (コウモト タケシ, Kōmoto Takeshi) is a young boy of toddler's age who dies due to abuse from his mother's boyfriend. His mother had been half-asleep and gave the hungry Takeshi permission to eat pudding from the refrigerator. When her boyfriend later comes home, he reacts violently and unintentionally kills Takeshi. Takeshi does not die instantly, and his mother and her boyfriend leave him, believing him to be alive. Before his death, draws a fictional hero called "Muscle Rider", and when he awakes inside Gantz's room as a participant in the game he believes that Kaze is "Muscle Rider". Kaze watches over Takeshi during his first mission, and Kaze later decides to let him stay with him after learning of Takeshi's cause of death. Takeshi continues to believe that Kaze is Muscle Rider. By chapter 240, he discovers and uses the abilities of the suit, including the utilization of the "back attack", Kaze's signature move. Despite Takeshi's small size, he is capable of defending himself against average opponents. Having imitated Kaze's fighting style, Takeshi manages to dispel a group of monsters that surround him, as well as injure a rather large creature that comes from the river, earning himself 26 points at the end of the mission. He later even lands a surprise attack on the Gantz veteran, Nishi.

=== Kouki Inaba ===
Kouki Inaba (稲葉 光輝, Inaba Kōki) is an average man, gunned down in the Shinjuku massacre. He was named after Koshi Inaba, the vocalist for the Japanese rock group B'z. His full-time occupation is later revealed to be as a designer. He is the only participant apart from Izumi that does not train with Kurono, as he thinks Kurono should not be leader. Inaba even sides with Izumi during the Tae Alien mission to assassinate Tae, but he eventually realizes that his only chance of survival is under Kurono's guidance. Inaba is revealed to be afraid of fighting, and tries to feign a cool head in these situations. He is attracted to Reika, and later confesses his feelings, but she rejects him. After the Oni mission, he gains respect for Kurono and believes that Kurono could actually become the group leader. After Kurono's death, Inaba still participates with the other Gantz team members in fighting the aliens. Despite having defeated powerful enemies, Inaba is killed during the Italian mission.

=== Hoi Hoi ===
Hoi Hoi (開開, Hoi Hoi) is a giant panda transported to the Gantz room. Hoi Hoi is the second animal to become a Gantz player during the series. He displays a fondness for Izumi, who in turn is confused as to Hoi Hoi's affection for him. However, Izumi does save him from death during a mission. Hoi Hoi earns no points until the Osaka mission, in which he earns 40 points. After the Italian mission, he does not reappear in the Gantz room, and it is assumed that he died during the mission, though no one comments on his absence.

=== Sei Sakuraoka ===
Sei Sakuraoka (桜丘 聖, Sakuraoka Sei) is a Gantz participant who excelled in martial arts. She appears at the start of the Buddhist Temple mission. She is the first person to have sex with Kurono, having agreed to it when Kurono asked her before the mission started. Sei asks him to be her boyfriend, and he agrees, but she realizes later that he did not share her feelings. During the mission, she asks if he would love her if she defeated a large alien. Sei fights the alien by herself, but is killed. Kurono is shown to still have some affection for her, as when he's about to tell Kaze who he would like to revive, he thinks briefly of her and Kishimoto, before choosing Nishi out of sheer pragmatism. She would later be resurrected by the divine being where she reunites with Kurono and is disheartened to see that he is now with Reiko. She is soon killed again by the divine being to show the others the futility of human life. In the anime, she is voiced by Mie Sonozaki in Japanese and by Kelly Manison in the English dub.

=== Osaka Gantz team ===
The first mission from Phase 2 brings the Gantz team into contact with their Osaka-based counterparts. The Osaka Team is, in essence, a gang of rebels: unlike the Tokyo team, they have appointed no leader, nor do they have any attack plans. Often, an Osakan team member will choose an enemy to fight solo while the others stand by, not assisting even if that team member dies. Several team members play with their prey instead of focusing on exterminating all targets; three members are dubbed "3-S" (ドSの3人, Do esu no san-nin) for being extremely sadistic. Kuwabara Kazuo rapes the female aliens before killing them. Most of the Osakan team members are highly confident in their abilities, having obtained 100 points at least once. Hachirō Oka (岡八郎, Oka Hachirō), for example, is said to have obtained 100 points seven times. Because of their overconfidence, most of them were killed during the Nurarihyon mission. However, Anzu Yamasaki (山咲杏, Yamasaki Anzu) falls in love with Kato and dies protecting him. After the mission, the survivors are Kuwabara Kazuo, a bespectacled 17-year-old nerd, and the two groupies. However, during the alien invasion later in the storyline, it is seen that Anzu was revived by the 17-year-old nerd as he had promised Kato.

=== Aliens ===
In each mission, Gantz informs the Hunters about a current target which must be hunted. This information includes an image of the target as well as its characteristics, what it likes, and favorite quotes. As well as the main target, Gantz players also must battle against other monsters. These monsters and the main target are known collectively as aliens.

- The first aliens encountered were the Greenonion Aliens, green humanoid beings which consisted of a father and son. The childlike one, despite its pleas for mercy, is easily disposed, which invokes the anger of its father.
- The second alien target was the doll-like entity known as the Tanaka Alien (modeled after singer Seiji Tanaka). They are robotic shells that carry bird-like aliens within them, and used because the bird aliens are unable to breathe in Earth's atmosphere. They are led by a larger bird creature with tubes in his mouth connected to a small respirator like device behind his neck, replacing the suit of the minions.
- The Buddhist Temple aliens dwelt in a Buddhist temple and are disguised as a variety of statues, and are immensely powerful and durable. The most dangerous one is disguised as a statue of the Goddess of Mercy, Kannon. Under its shell was a lizard-like creatures with six arms that displayed the ability to speak coherently, at least after having eaten a human brain.
- The Shorty Aliens were, as their name suggest, had a short stature. They were physically powerful and fast, and possessed strong telepathic abilities. The Shorty Aliens also had fleshy, wing-shaped membranes that allowed them to disguise themselves as humans.
- The Kappe alien was a single alien that could increase in size and had the ability to control a variety of dinosaur-like aliens. These included a Triceratops with the ability to stand upright and increase their muscle mass, several Tyrannosaurus rex that could shoot fireballs from their mouths, and tens of raptor-shaped aliens with razor sharp tails. Near the end, a massive alien resembling a Brachiosaurus appeared. It had a massive blade that projected from its skull, which it swung to cleave its opponents.
- The Ring Aliens were aliens resembling massive warriors wearing black armor and riding giant black horses. They relied heavily on their size and large bladed polearms.
- The Oni Aliens were the first aliens to become visible to humans not involved with Gantz. Though they could assume a human form, their true forms were humanoid with long tentacles in place of arms, sword-like claws, elongated necks, and short horns.
- The Yokai aliens are hundreds of creatures from Japanese mythology, the Nurarihyon is the supreme commander of all Yokai. It has the power to transform rapidly into several forms and could shoot lasers from its eyes.
- Believed to be the final aliens to fight before the end of the world, the aliens in Italy are based on the Roman statues and fine arts. They easily destroyed Gantz players using only speed and strength.
- The final enemies are a whole civilization of still unnamed humanoid giants that invaded the Earth with several spaceships at the beginning of Katastrophe. Although their clothed bodies resemble those of humans, their heads boast several distinguishing features, such as an extra pair of eyes on the brows and small antelope-like ears protruding from the top. Unlike most of the previous aliens, their civilization and society are structured in a fashion similar to the Earth ones, but their technology is far more advanced, on par with those provided by Gantz. They usually treat humans like any other animal, raising them as pets, butchering them for food, or just killing them for amusement. Despite that some of them seem to be genuinely caring of humans, choosing to help them instead of attacking them, prominently the female named Fra Rarada who helped Kurono and Tae to reunite. Beside the humanoids, their spaceships are inhabited with a diverse fauna of alien creatures, some of them extremely dangerous to earthlings, even against those armed with Gantz weaponry.

=== Vampires ===
The "vampires" (吸血鬼, Kyūketsuki) are sworn enemies of the Gantz game's participants, who they refer to as "Hunters". Kurono's younger brother, Akira Kurono, was one of them; a fact of which Kurono is still unaware. They can see past the Hunter's cloaking modules with special contact lenses or sunglasses, in addition to being able to spawn weapons from their bodies. The vampires are a result of numerous nanomachines within the human body, giving them super-human reflexes and strength. Vampires are able to maintain a regular human diet but suffer from dizziness and a bat-wings-shaped eczema on their back if no human blood is consumed. For the vampires, sunlight is lethal, though some take some special medicine that toughens their skin, allowing them to walk around in the daylight. They mainly attack the "Hunters" at night. The vampires seem to have connections with some of the aliens seen in the latter part of the series, including the Oni Aliens. Oku created these characters in order to have villains with human appearances.

==== Host Samurai ====
Hikawa, nicknamed "Host Samurai" (ホストざむらい, Hosuto Zamurai) by Gantz, is the leader of the vampires, who fight against the Gantz players. He appears as a handsome man with shoulder-length light hair. He is shown to be a skilled fighter and swordsman who cares only for himself. When questioned by his partner, "Kill Bill", if he would miss her if she died, he hesitantly responds that he wouldn't. He is transported to the Gantz room after killing Kurono and holding onto Suzuki, intending to kill him next. Gantz nicknames him "Host Samurai", as a reference to hostesses. He is placed under the same limitations as the other players, but later kills members of the Osaka Gantz team. Like the other players, Host Samurai is sent free after the Italian mission. With "Kill Bill", he leaves the others and tells her that he doesn't feel like eliminating them at that moment.

==== Kill Bill ====
Chiaki, nicknamed "Kill Bill" (きるびる, Kiru Biru) by Gantz, is a vampire under "Host Samurai"'s leadership. She appears as a young woman wearing a suit, with long dark hair, and is nicknamed after Gogo Yubari of the movie Kill Bill due to their extreme resemblance. Her first appearance is that of a normal girl going with some friends to a club which is in fact the vampire's base. Although Akira Kurono tries to protect her, Host Samurai defeats him and takes her. She then reappears as a vampire attacking Kei Kurono, and after she attempts to kills Reika she is sent to the Gantz room with Host Samurai. She is a skilled fighter who uses a katana in battle though that can be debated as she was swiftly taken out and nearly killed by one of the yokai aliens. She is quiet and rarely shows emotion, prompting her partner to become surprised when she laughs at the nickname Gantz gives him. After being released by Gantz, she asks Host Samurai if they should kill the Gantz players. After he declines the idea, she follows him out of the room.

== Minor characters ==
=== Akira Kurono ===
Akira Kurono (玄野アキラ, Kurono Akira) is Kei Kurono's younger brother. Despite their age difference, Akira looks older than he does. Their parents treated Akira much better and favored him because of his achievements. Kei and Akira did not get along well, and eventually Kei moved away to escape his family. Akira enjoyed his life, having a girlfriend and doing well in school, but began to notice changes, such a skin condition developing on his back and headaches. After accidentally attending a seminar on vampires, Akira realizes that they are symptoms of vampirism, and becomes afraid. He learns of Hikawa and the vampires' plot to kill Kei, and Akira contacts him. He tells Kei what precautions to take and about the vampires' weakness to UV light. Akira is later killed and his disembodied head revealed to Kei.

=== Tonkotsu ===
Tonkotsu (トンコツ) is Sakurai's girlfriend. After Sakurai had posted online about wanting to commit suicide, he received a comment from both Sakata and Tonkotsu offering help. Unlike Sakata, who urged him to kill those bullying him, Tonkotsu told him not to because he could never be the same. Despite this, Sakurai instead kills the bullies. Tonkotsu and Sakurai decided to meet up at a store in Shinjuku with Sakata, but became caught in the chaos of Izumi's shooting. Tonkotsu sprained her ankle and urged Sakurai and Sakata to leave her. Later, Sakurai reveals his powers to her and confesses his regrets for killing the bullies. Tonkotsu suggests that he use his powers for good, and aids him in solving a murder. After the supposed date of the end of the world is revealed to Sakurai, he decides to spend time with Tonkotsu and take her on a date. She is killed during the giant alien attack, which triggers Sakurai's power-up and alien hunting spree.

== Reception ==
The characters from the series have received praise and criticism from various reviewers. In a review from the manga, Carlo Santos from Anime News Network noted the series to have good fights, although when it becomes better, the characters tend to stop as "the story is trying to make some statement about the downfall of society". He also criticized artwork from the author, saying it was "lifeless", mentioning that the only visual innovation to be found here is "unwrapping body" effect, as well as the fanservice, and the violence. However, in a review from the anime, Theron Martin commented that Kurono was a "seriously flawed hero" due to the mix of comedy and villainous value in the anime. He also added that all the other characters act as perfect complements to Kurono since they have different moral values and that it makes them to be "credible portrayals of flawed central characters". James Musgrove from IGN agreed on this and added that all the characters have good reactions based on their different backgrounds, making them "all believable and well-crafted". Dan Barry from Mania Entertainment defined the series and its cast as "sick", making them not good for many people to watch due to all the violence and adult content appearing in most episodes. However, he then mentioned that if they can watch they will note they are missing "some of the most intelligent topical material and realistic portrayals of humanism I've ever seen in any kind of series". He commented that while Gantz is a survival game, the characters will continue to react "like real people". However, THEM Anime Reviews mentioned that Kurono is an unlikely character since the start as he is "a soulless character", while Kato "deserved a better show, rather than playing second fiddle to a complete cretin", due to the fact he wishes to make the good.

== See also ==
- Gantz
- List of Gantz chapters
- List of Gantz episodes
- List of Gantz equipment
