= Syaoran =

An image depicting three versions of Syaoran by Clamp. Left: Syaoran Li from Cardcaptor Sakura. Centre: the clone Syaoran from Tsubasa: Reservoir Chronicle. Right: the original Syaoran from Tsubasa: Reservoir Chronicle.

Syaoran (Chinese: 小狼, Xiǎoláng; Japanese: シャオラン, Shaoran) is the given name of three fictional characters created by Clamp:

- Syaoran Li, the male protagonist of Cardcaptor Sakura
- Syaoran (clone), the first protagonist and later antagonist of Tsubasa: Reservoir Chronicle
- Syaoran (original), the second protagonist of Tsubasa: Reservoir Chronicle and the character from which the first protagonist was cloned
