= XxxHolic: A Midsummer Night's Dream =

2005 film by Tsutomu Mizushima

xxxHolic: A Midsummer Night's Dream
- North American DVD cover
- Kanji: 劇場版 ×××HOLiC 真夏ノ夜ノ夢
- Revised Hepburn: Gekijōban Horriku: Manatsu no Yo no Yume
- Directed by: Tsutomu Mizushima
- Screenplay by: Junichi Fujisaku; Yoshiki Sakurai
- Based on: xxxHolic by CLAMP
- Produced by: Hiroki Morita; Ikuko Shikano; Junji Seki; Natsumi Shirahama; Tetsuya Nakatake; Tetsuya Watanabe; Toru Kawaguchi; Toshiaki Doushita; Yoshihiro Iwasaki
- Starring: Jun Fukuyama; Sayaka Ohara
- Cinematography: Hisashi Ezura
- Edited by: Taeko Hamauzu
- Music by: Tsuneyoshi Saito
- Production company: Production I.G
- Distributed by: Shochiku
- Release date: August 20, 2005 (Japan)
- Running time: 60 minutes
- Country: Japan
- Language: Japanese

xxxHolic: A Midsummer Night's Dream (Japanese: 劇場版 ×××HOLiC 真夏ノ夜ノ夢, Hepburn: Gekijōban Horikku: Manatsu no Yo no Yume) is a 2005 Japanese animated supernatural dark fantasy film based on xxxHolic manga series written and illustrated by manga artist group CLAMP. The film is directed by Tsutomu Mizushima, co-written by Junichi Fujisaku and Yoshiki Sakurai, and produced by Production I.G. The film was released in Japan on August 20, 2005, as a double bill with the Tsubasa: Reservoir Chronicle short film, Tsubasa Reservoir Chronicle the Movie: The Princess in the Birdcage Kingdom, also by Production I.G (unlike the Tsubasa Chronicle television series) and originally based on a CLAMP manga.

The film is the first film adaptation and the first voiced work based on xxxHolic.

== Plot ==
A woman comes to Yūko to ask for assistance because her key (an elaborate golden artifact) won't unlock her mansion. Coincidentally, Yūko receives an invitation to the same mansion. She takes Watanuki and Dōmeki along with her to solve the mystery. When they reach the place, a grand mansion with a tower, they are able to enter without trouble, but they discover they aren't the only people there. Many collectors were invited to what they believe to be some kind of auction that would enable to complete their collections. Watanuki feels that something dangerous is happening, as strange events take place at night and the organizer of the auction doesn't present himself.

When collectors start disappearing one by one, Watanuki and Dōmeki penetrate the depths of the mansion. Browsing through a variety of collections in the rooms of the mansion, among them a room full of barbed wire, a room full of chains, and a room full of masks, they find out that the captured collectors are kept in what looks like a collection of paintings. They are joined by Yūko to meet the Collector, a ghost-like entity who seeks to have the greatest collection of anything ever. The Collector summons apparitions against them, and Watanuki and Dōmeki have to fight them, while Ichihara confronts the Collector himself. When it seems that she has been captured by the Collector, she reveals the true reason of his desire to collect, an old promise made to a little girl a long time ago. The revelation makes the mansion disappear, and they appear outside of a much smaller house, where the Collector admiringly re-encounters the girl, now an old lady in a wheelchair, who was actually the woman who hired Yūko.

With the curse dissipated and the collectors liberated, the trio move to a nearby resort, where Yūko also brings Himawari and Mokona. In the final scene, Syaoran and Sakura make an appeal to Yūko to free the Birdcage Kingdom from the darkness. Yūko helps by giving them the key that helped unlock the mansion.

== Casts ==
Character	Japanese voice actor	English voice actor
Kimihiro Watanuki	Jun Fukuyama	Todd Haberkorn
Yūko Ichihara	Sayaka Ohara	Colleen Clinkenbeard
Shizuka Dōmeki	Kazuya Nakai	J. Michael Tatum
Himawari Kunogi	Shizuka Itō	Cherami Leigh
Maru & Moro	Kazuko Kojima (Maru); Hisayo Mochizuki (Moro)	Leah Clark (Maru); Brina Palencia (Moro)
Black Mokona	Mika Kikuchi	Carrie Savage
Syaoran	Miyu Irino	Jason Liebrecht
Tomoyo	Maaya Sakamoto	Amber Cotton
House Spirit	Taiki Matsuno	–
Old Lady	Yoshiko Matsuo	Julie Erickson

== Release ==
=== Japanese release ===
The film was released in Japanese theaters on August 20, 2005, with the short film Tsubasa Reservoir Chronicle the Movie: The Princess in the Birdcage Kingdom as a double feature.

=== English release ===
The film was licensed by Funimation Entertainment in North America and released alongside the forty-minute anime film Tsubasa Reservoir Chronicle the Movie: The Princess in the Birdcage Kingdom. It was released with both Japanese and English. The Blu-ray has full 1080p high definition and AVC encoding. The audio is Dolby TrueHD with a 5.1 track for the English dub and a 2.0 track for the original Japanese version. The special features are some trailers, a recording montage, character artwork, background designs, and some video footage of the film's opening release in Japan. The back of the Tsubasa movie/xxxHolic movie combo DVD and Blu-ray Disc claims that it has over two hours of bonus features. There is a commentary from the original Japanese actors, actresses, and other staff.

== Reception ==
N.S. Davidson of IGN said that the film is very original, clever, and long enough to get things accomplished. Todd Douglass Jr. of DVD Talk said that the film feels like an extended episode, but that it has better animation and a better story. The film was selected for the 2006 Annecy International Animated Film Festival alongside the films Wallace & Gromit: The Curse of the Were-Rabbit, Renaissance, Asterix and the Vikings, and Origin: Spirits of the Past.
