= Clamp Double Feature =

Clamp Double Feature may refer to two films that were released in Japan on August 20, 2005.

- Tsubasa Reservoir Chronicle: Princess of the Birdcage Kingdom
- xxxHolic: A Midsummer Night's Dream
