= Syaoran (Tsubasa: Reservoir Chronicle, original) =

Fictional character from Tsubasa: Reservoir Chronicle

- Tsubasa: Reservoir Chronicle xxxHolic character
- Syaoran as illustrated by Clamp
- First appearance: Tsubasa: Reservoir Chronicle chapter 63: "Another Young Man" (2004)
- Created by: Clamp
- Voiced by: Miyu Irino (Japanese); Jason Liebrecht (English)

In-universe information
- Alias: Tsubasa
- Weapon: Jian
- Relatives: Syaoran (clone/father); Sakura (mother); Kimihiro Watanuki (alternative self); Clow Reed (ancestor)

Tsubasa (ツバサ), usually called Syaoran (Japanese: 小狼, Hepburn: Shaoran; also officially written as『小狼』) is a fictional character from Clamp's manga series' Tsubasa: Reservoir Chronicle. In the series, the character is initially seen as child imprisoned by the sorcerer Fei-Wang Reed and appears in visions of the series' protagonist, the clone Syaoran. Upon being freed from his prison, Syaoran goes to kill his doppelgänger but fails as he escapes to carry Fei-Wang's will. As a result, Syaoran decides to join Sakura's journey across dimensions to accomplish his own mission. Syaoran also appears in the Clamp's series xxxHolic, where he often interacts with the teenager Kimihiro Watanuki whom he often sends messages to and in the Tsubasa spin-off Tsubasa World Chronicle: Mirai Nikki-Hen he goes in another journey to find his clone.

Clamp created Syaoran as the series' second protagonist of Tsubasa who would replace the clone in the second half, while developing unique traits alongside Watanuki. As most of Clamp's works involve twin characters, for Tsubasa, the team instead decided to create the dynamic of the two Syaorans as doppelgängers in order to set them up apart, despite being identical. Like the clone counterpart, Syaoran has been voiced by Miyu Irino in Japanese and Jason Liebrecht in English.

Critical reception to Syaoran was initially mixed due to his unknown identity and objective. This was mostly because of the large amount of exposition done in his introduction among other characters but the animated version was noted to have introduced in better form. Nevertheless, the characters' continued fights and backstory portrayed in the climax of the manga earned positive response for being well written as he was finally explored.

== Creation and development ==
Syaoran was conceived as the second protagonist from Tsubasa: Reservoir Chronicle who would replace the first Syaoran, revealed to be his clone. Like the clone, Clamp developed Syaoran characters using the Osamu Tezuka's Star System. Both clones and originals Syaorans and Sakuras were based on Syaoran Li and Sakura Kinomoto respectively from their previous series Cardcaptor Sakura. Since twin characters are common in Clamp's works, for Tsubasa they decided to do something different from that. However, it was difficult to have only their outward appearances be the same – to have them be a different person about whom the reader did not know anything up until now – so because of that, they had them share memories.

Clamp aimed to make both Syaorans of them equally different based on their actions despite being virtually identical. The usage of two characters with the same appearance was noted by Clamp to be a common elements in their stories, but Clamp also aimed to create another link between Syaoran, Sakura and Watanuki, the protagonist of xxxHolic. They distinguished the characters by staying conscious of their pre-established environments. The two Syaorans more specifically endeavored to have Clamp depict them as being fairly different outside of their earnest aspects, too. With the ending of Tsubasa, Clamp wrote the spin-off World Chronicle in order to elaborate on Syaoran's never-ending journey and the people he would encounter.

=== Casting ===
In the animated adaptations of Tsubasa, Syaoran is voiced by Miyu Irino in Japanese and Jason Liebrecht in English. Irino said that ever since the introduction of the original Syaoran—who he also voiced—he sometimes had problems voicing both characters. Fellow voice actress Yui Makino also discussed Irino's role, saying that he was the most difficult character to cast because of the requirement to portray the two Syaorans. Upon reading the series and the script for the OVAs, Irino found the story of the original Syaoran too sad so he faced difficulties with voicing the two characters. Nevertheless, he looked forward to Production I.G's work in adapting the manga.

== Characterization and themes ==
Clamp further elaborated the Syaoran clone also has his own doppelgänger commonly referred as "The Other Syaoran" who at the same time shares the same identity as the protagonist from xxxHolic, Kimihiro Watanuki. The main idea was connecting these two series was to have protagonists from two different manga with different personalities and designs. However, during the ending they would be stated to share the same existence, and had to go on different paths. The constant interactions between Watanuki and Syaoran were made to build up why both of these characters are important in their respective series as well as to explore more the crossover element Tsubasa has with xxxHolic. While the two meet in the first series, they do not have personal conversations until the climax and the sequels through their friends, the two Mokona Modokis.

The character's backstory is not properly explored until the series' climax. As a result, Syaoran's remains a mystery in regards to his intentions. However, once Syaoran is revealed to have turned back time to save the original Syaoran, writers noted that the character has lived through his entire life carrying guilt for the possible sins he might have created when reversing time. Similar to how Syaoran often supports Watanuki, Syaoran receives comfort from Kurogane and Fai who understand his fears and loneliness.

== Appearances ==
=== In Tsubasa: Reservoir Chronicle ===
Syaoran is first seen as a child sleeping in water in an unknown area by sorcerer Fei-Wang Reed. He often connects with the other Syaoran, the protagonist of the manga, granting him aid in fights by connecting their bodies but also appears in visions where he threatens the teenager. When Syaoran's body becomes that of a teenager, he is freed from his prison and is transported to Yuko Ichihara's shop. He requests Yuko to help him visit the other Syaoran. As this happens, it is revealed this young man is a descendant from the sorcerer Clow Reed. Using his magic Syaoran was able to seal part of his "heart" within his clone, meant to be manipulated by Fei-Wang, allowing the clone to grow a personality. Despite being imprisoned and sealed in slumber by Fei-Wang in his first appearances, Syaoran is sometimes able control his clone's body to assist him in his journey. Once the clone betrays his friends, he joins the group of Kurogane, Fai, Mokona and Sakura as he wishes to recover something he lost, later revealing he wished to find the original Sakura. Despite feeling guilty for his clone's betrayal to the group, Syaoran befriends them as they do not find him responsible for it. He is a skilled fighter, having observed all of his clone's actions. He is also able to perform elemental spell alongside and perform swordsmanship with his jian which he keeps merged within his body.

Syaoran was born in a modern Japan, where his father passed him his name, Syaoran Li (李 小狼, Ri Shaoran). Syaoran was sent by Yūko to Kingdom of Clow, as his mother had foreseen a future which involved him in such a world. There, he met the original Sakura, with whom he started bonding, promising he would protect her. When Fei-Wang placed a death seal on Sakura, Syaoran stayed in Clow for seven years with no means of returning and traveled all over the world to different countries, in order to find a way to remove the seal. Just before Sakura's death, Syaoran was granted a wish to turn back time by Yūko, but at the price of losing his freedom to Fei-Wang who started to create his and Sakura's clones. Kimihiro Watanuki was created to replace Syaoran within his original world, and Syaoran also used his payment to protect Watanuki from dangers.

During the group's battle against Fei-Wang, Syaoran manages to rescue the original Sakura from Fei-Wang's death seal. However, after Fei-Wang dies, the two Syaorans and Watanuki are subjected to his final curse, and the three of them are pulled into a void between time and space. With the clone disappearing, the real Syaoran breaks the curse by forcing himself to travel across different worlds for the rest of his life. However, not confident about the clone's disappearance, Syaoran hopes to find a way so that they would be reborn and be their equals. Before continuing his journey alongside Kurogane, Fai and Mokona, Syaoran and Sakura confess their love for each other and reveal their true names: both are named Tsubasa. The power of the memories of his clone will always lead him back to Sakura's side, even if he must leave again.

=== Other appearances ===
Besides Tsubasa: Reservoir Chronicle, Syaoran also appears in xxxHolic. Kimihiro Watanuki often has visions of Syaoran telling him to keep existing. Still continuing his journey, Syaoran and his friends make a special appearance in xxxHolic a year after the journey began and accidentally helping Watanuki to create his own signature. Syaoran's group is also present the anime adaptation of Kobato where they meet the young title girl and help with making meals as an exchange for living together. In the drama CD series, he goes by the name of Syaoron (小龍, Shaoron), appearing as Syaoran's older twin.

Across xxxHolic Rei, Watanuki gathers items needed to assist Syaoran in a new mission. Syaoran returns as the protagonist of Tsubasa World Chronicle where he, Kurogane, Fai and Mokona go to the country of Nirai Kanai. He meets a goddess who has met his clone in another dimension which causes the group to explore the world. In Utaki, the original Syaoran seeks to fight the clone in order to make him reincarnate alongside the undead from the world. However, since the Syaoran clone has been summoned as the original's opponent, it is impossible for him to obtain a new life. The clone then forces the original Syaoran to fight him and return the people from Nirai Kanai. Syaoran uses his magic to brutally attack his clone in a fit of rage due to his other self's wounds which nearly destroys the area in his constant attacks to Utaki. Successful at his task, the original Syaoran recovers until Fai and Kurogane invite him to a meal.

== Reception ==
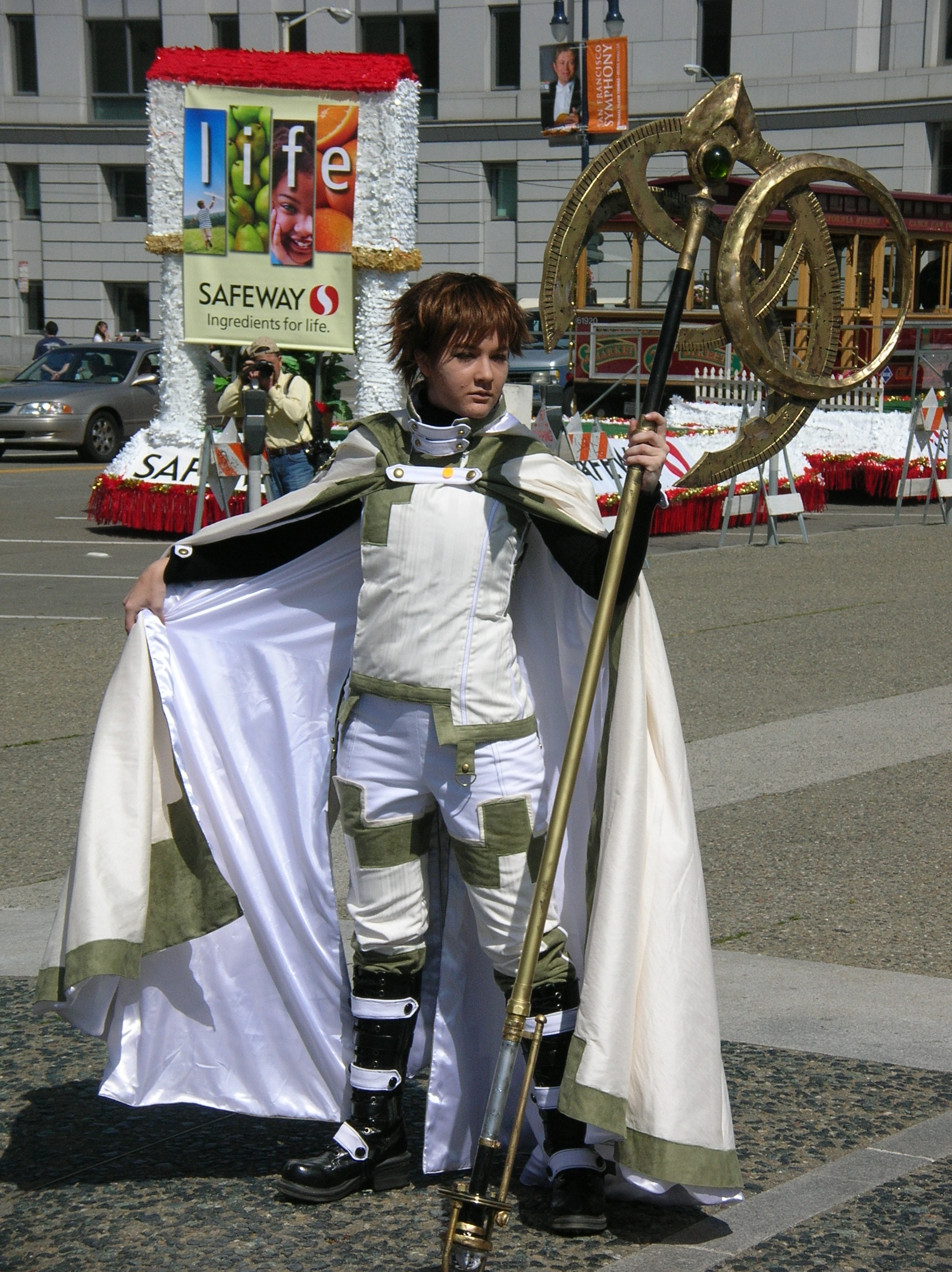
A cosplayer of Syaoran

Initial reaction to Syaoran remained in mystery due to how unknown identity with Anime News Network calling him "evil twin" due to how he continues threatening the original across dreams but saw his interaction with Yuko as interesting. Manga News refrained from explaining the twists involving the two Syaorans as stating any conflict from his review would generate major spoilers to the readers but felt the relationship would still surprise them. The relationship between both Syaorans has also been found confusing for some readers to understand; Sakura Eries from Mania Entertainment the exposition provided by Syaoran might confuse readers and the fact that he is a descendant of the sorcerer Clow Reed rather than other Clamp characters like Sakura or Toya. Others said that while there was confusion in this scene, the events led to a well-executed ending. They also highlighted the bond both have through their eyes. Chris Zimmerman from Comic Book Bin highlighted that since the original Syaoran's introduction, the narrative takes a darker tone, especially when he starts engaging in gruesome fights with the clone, calling it a "titanic clash". A similar comment was done by Todd Douglass Jr. from DVD Talk based on how the clash between the two Syaorans, the plot becomes darker in regards to their allies. Chris Beveridge felt the OVAs explored better the handling of the two Syaorans and was glad the mysteries from the original Tsubasa: Reservoir Chronicle anime involving the two Syaorans are better seen in this collection even if they might confuse the audience sightly in regards to who is the original.

Manga Life called Syaoran "earnest" in terms of personality for how different he is from the heroic Syaoran from the series' beginning. Manga News found Syaoran's personality as more as humble and comical in contrast to the angstier Sakura who does not want to see him due to the similarities between him and the clone. This was noted to have created a complex relationship within the group with the exception of Kurogane who opens up to him when interacting. Anime News Network was also impressed by how Clamp illustrated Syaoran during his fight scenes in a tournament as well as against Seishiro, although the swordsmanship displayed in the latter did not reach the common appeal of Syaoran's typical fights. Instead, Santos found Syaoran's fight against Seishiro as a build up to the more important battle against his doppelganger. The fact that Syaoran's sword happens to be a jian just like the Syaoran Li from Cardcaptor Sakura was found by Eries from the Fandom Post as a means of fanservice to attract more readers from such series. However, Syaron battling a doll inspired by Hikaru from Angelic Layer in a death match would come as strange to the fanbase.

The flashbacks involving the origins of this characters were the subject of praise. Anime News Network enjoyed the more innocent Syaoran seen in Kingdom of Clow where he fell in love with the original Sakura as children as their interactions were felt to be good written by Clamp. Holly Ellingwood enjoyed the deep connection Syaoran developed with the lead from xxxHolic, Kimihiro Watanuki. Ellingwood commented that the character became a tragic hero due how he became imprisoned by Fei Wang Reed in order to change the future and save Sakura, causing possible changes in society. Ellingwood also praised how Syaoran and Watanuki are guided by Yuko, and how the former has to face his clone once again. Manga News found the fate of the character too tragic as he could see through the flashback how Syaoran's happy childhood would become darker when being eventually imprisoned by Fei Wang Reed. Following the ending of Tsubasa, Manga News enjoyed Syaoran's cameo in the 18th volume of xxxHolic as his personal relationship with Watanuki is explored for the first time. In regards to the character's role in Tsubasa World Chronicle, Manga News said that the originals Syaoran and Sakura did not manage to reach a proper happy ending and thus the sequel was necessary to provide the cast a necessary ending by Clamp. Manga News also felt that readers would need to read xxxHolic Rei to understand furthermore the relationship Syaoran and Watanuki have as the latter spends time in his manga collecting items to aid him in his journey.

Sarahi Isuki Castella Olivera from Benemérita Universidad Autónoma de Puebla said that while the two Syaoran are nearly identical characters, they possess different hearts with the clone losing it in the series' second half as a result of being controlled by Fei Wang Reed. The differences between the two Syaoran's paths lead into both of them becoming their own separate beings. The same happens with the two Sakuras. The original Syaoran is said to fall into humiliation when he forced to ask Fei Wang's help to protect the original Sakura which leads to the creation of his own clone. The identity they possess is compared to buddhism zen as it coincides with the individualism of a person; Both Syaorans are often drawn together but their stances, weaponry and clothing is often made different and are found fighting against each other comparable to the yin and yang.

Comic Book Resources compared the relationship of Syaoran and Sakura to that of the Cardcaptor Sakura character Syaoran Li and Sakura Kinomoto but on a more bittersweet note as they are in the end revealed, despite sharing their unconditinal love, taking different paths as Syaoran is forced to travel throughout his entire life in order to escape from Fei-Wang Reed's dying curse. Although Tsubasa is primarily a shōnen manga aimed towards young male readers, Clamp incorporated shōjo manga style not only into the narrative but also Syaoran's traits. Similar to how Syaoran is often connected with the choose he and his clone search, his real name "Tsubasa" which he shares with the original Sakura serve another shōjo manga element which solidifies their relationship as Tsubasa means "wing" like how wings complement each other when revealing their true identities.
