= Yuko Ichihara =

Fictional character from xxxHolic

- xxxHolic and Tsubasa: Reservoir Chronicle character
- Yuko as illustrated by Clamp
- First appearance: xxxHolic chapter 1
- Created by: Clamp
- Voiced by: Sayaka Ohara (Japanese); Colleen Clinkenbeard (English)
- Portrayed by: Anne Watanabe (drama); Kou Shibasaki (film)

In-universe information
- Alias: The Dimension Witch

Yuko Ichihara (Japanese: 壱原侑子, Hepburn: Ichihara Yūko) is a fictional character in the manga xxxHolic, which was created by the artist group Clamp. Yuko is a witch who owns a shop where people come to have their wishes granted, and most of her jobs involve dealing with supernatural beings. At the beginning of xxxHolic, she meets Kimihiro Watanuki, who becomes her assistant in exchange for removing spirits that follow him. Yuko also appears in the crossover manga Tsubasa: Reservoir Chronicle, where she assists the main characters in their journey across the multiverse, and is known as the "Dimension Witch" (次元魔女, Jigen Majo). She has also appeared in animated versions of the two series, as well as in other media.

When creating Yuko, Clamp wanted to have a character who is aware of the multiple fictional universes they had created in their career. Her personality was inspired by the authors' beautician. Yuko is voiced by Sayaka Ohara in Japanese and Colleen Clinkenbeard in English in the animated adaptions of xxxHolic and Tsubasa. Anne Watanabe portrays her in the xxxHolic mini-series, and Kou Shibasaki played her in the live-action xxxHolic film.

Critics praised Yuko for her personality and role in the series, as well as her connections with Watanuki, while the mystery surrounding her saw mixed response. She has also been popular with xxxHolic and Tsubasa: Reservoir Chronicle readers.

== Creation and design ==
Yuko was the first character created for xxxHolic; Clamp wanted to create a character who was aware of the multiple fictional universes they have created during her career, and would act as a bridge between xxxHolic and Tsubasa: Reservoir Chronicle as the latter's cast travels across worlds and remain in contact with Yuko. Clamp thought that Yuko was so "special" that she could have been the series' main character. After deciding it would be more entertaining to have a character who would be interested in Yuko's past, Clamp created Kimihiro Watanuki, both of whom they compared to Doraemon and Nobita Nobi, respectively, from the manga series Doraemon, with Yuko as the lead and Watanuki the audience surrogate.

Yuko's character was not finalized until Clamp met the model they used as the basis for her. As a result, the group gave Yuko their beautician's strong personality. They had problems designing the character, as it took them a long time to design her facial expressions. Clamp artist Mokona said drawing Yuko was challenging due to the character's proportions, something she planned to change with their next work, Kobato.

=== Casting ===
Clamp looked for a voice actor who was not heavily associated with another character they created. Sayaka Ohara voiced Yuko for four years, starting with the first Tsubasa: Reservoir Chronicle adaptation and ending with the xxxHolic original video animation (OVA). Ohara liked Yuko and thought that Watanuki could grow as an individual from her lessons about fate. For Ohara, Yuko was an elusive role she sometimes felt she had not fully grasped, but Yuko's bouts of mischief gave her a more comical characterization rather than her serious persona. Ohara became emotional for her final role in the xxxHolic Rō due to Yuko's death and her final interaction with Watanuki.

Watanuki's actor Jun Fukuyama was grateful for how Yuko developed in the anime alongside Watanuki. Producer Toru Kawaguchi, who worked in the series' original video animations, said Yuko significantly influenced his work. He was more interested in how the character often appeared in Tsubasa as well as xxxHolic. In the English dubbed series, she is voiced by Colleen Clinkenbeard.

For the mini-series, Anne Watanabe was cast as Yuko, and Kou Shibasaki was cast as her in the 2022 live-action film.

== Characterization and themes ==
When writing Yuko, Clamp placed emphasis on the importance of words. Yuko's conversations always affect the other characters due to how direct and secure she is when speaking. In early chapters, while Yuko works with a woman addicted to the internet by labeling her husband and child as "other people", Yuko emphasizes individualism and the power her client has. Kathryn Hemmann argues that Yuko is not depicted as a sinister character: she displays a childish persona, though she sometimes comes across as manipulative and selfish. Her appearances evoke a sex appeal common in seinen manga, making her appear to be the protagonist of the adult-aimed series. Yuko's adulthood is not only referenced by her sexuality, but also by her smoking and drinking habits. Her philosophy in regards to destiny or inevitability can be seen as a parallel to bad luck in her customers. Her deals with customers and cruel fates in some cases serve to show the readers the harsh reality of the real world which contrasts the shojo manga centered around a more optimistic view.

As the story progresses, Yuko forms a deep bond with Watanuki, who wants to grant her wish. After she dies, Watanuki starts acting like her and decides that he will wait for her, inheriting his unpaid price from the series' beginning as a magic that heavily slows his aging. The bond between both of them was claimed to be toxic due to how Watanuki becomes obsessed with waiting for Yuko but Clamp claimed it was the character's ideal happy ending in response.

== Appearances ==
=== In xxxHolic and Tsubasa: Reservoir Chronicle ===
Yuko is introduced in xxxHolic as a witch who runs a shop. She grants wishes to customers in exchange for something of equal value, which can range from precious objects to abstract concepts. At the beginning of the series, she hires Kimihiro Watanuki as her assistant in exchange for protecting him from yōkai. She constantly speaks of inevitability and how nothing is a coincidence while dealing with several of her guests.

Across both xxxHolic and Tsubasa: Reservoir Chronicle, Yuko remains in contact with Syaoran and his companions. To grant him the ability of travelling across dimensions and save his friend Sakura, Yuko uses a pair of creatures named Mokona Modoki that are able to cross worlds. Yuko created these creatures alongside the sorcerer Clow Reed in anticipation for the series' events. During Tsubasa it is revealed that Yuko was once going to die but Clow Reed accidentally used his powers to freeze time for her. After her time is frozen, she becomes the enemy of sorcerer Fei-Wang Reed who is manipulating Syaoran's group. Near the end of Tsubasa: Reservoir Chronicle, Yuko is revived by Fei-Wang in order to prove his superiority to Clow. She then gives up her life as the price for Fei-Wang's two creations, the clones Syaoran and Sakura, to be reborn as normal humans in compensation for how they were used by the sorcerer because of her.

Before dying, Yuko finds Watanuki and tells him her wish is for him to continue existing. Over a hundred years after her death in the ending of xxxHolic, Watanuki owns her shop. In the end, Watanuki has a series of dreams where Yuko gradually reveals herself to him; finally, she tells him that he has stayed in her shop for a long time and now has the power to leave it.

=== Other appearances ===
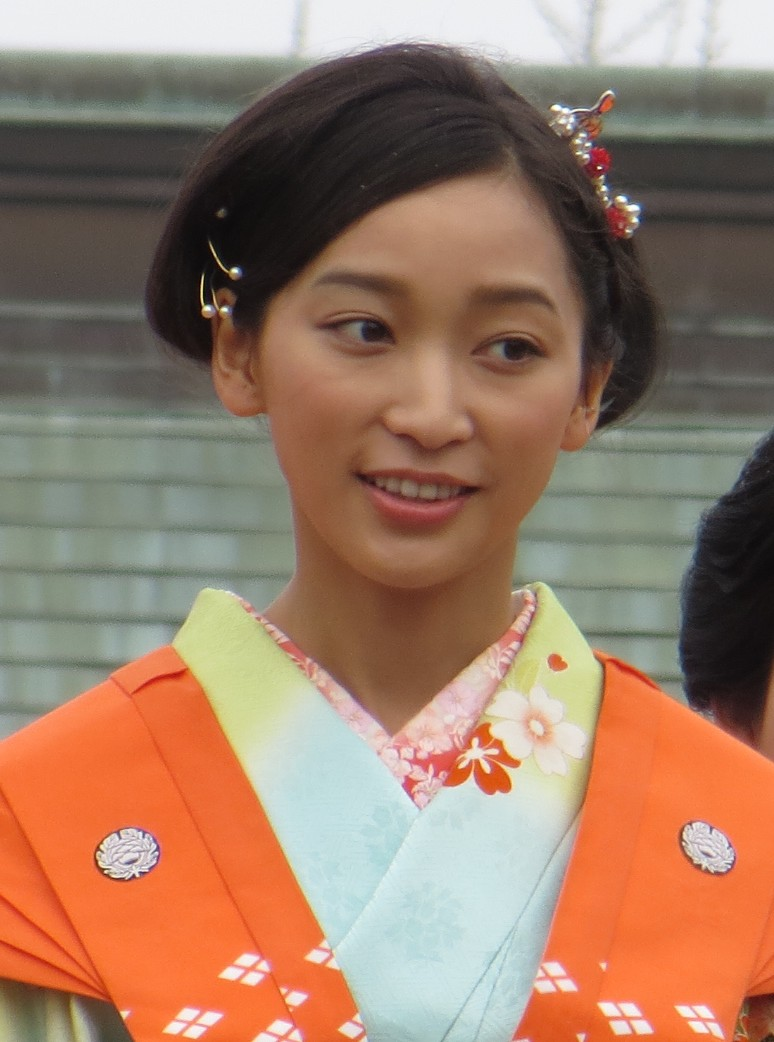
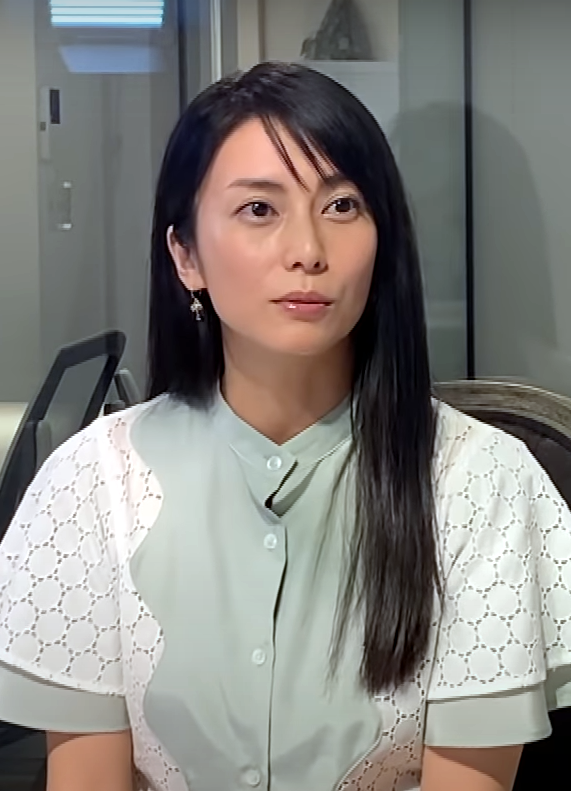
Anne Watanabe portrays Yuko in the live-action drama; Ko Shibasaki plays her in the live-action film.

Outside the manga series, Yuko has appeared in the animated movie xxxHolic: A Midsummer Night's Dream, where she visits a mansion whose owner is collecting the hearts of its visitors, and in Tsubasa Reservoir Chronicle the Movie: The Princess in the Birdcage Kingdom, where she contacts Syaoran's group once again. In the xxxHolic Rō OVA, which takes place after her death, Watanuki receives a recorded tape from a girl that has Yuko saying "I'm home". In xxxHolic: Rō Adayume, Watanuki finds Yuko in one of Shizuka Dōmeki's memories. Anne Watanabe plays Yuko in the live action TV series. In the audio drama CD series Holitsuba, she appears as a teacher from the titular school.

Yuko is also in the video game xxxHolic: Watanuki no Izayoi Sowa and in the book Soel and Larg: The Adventures of Mokona Modoki. The latter event is retold in the drama xxxHolic Kei. She is also a prominent character in the novelization Another Holic by Nisio Isin. In December 2015, Clamp made a collaboration with Victor Entertainment to create a music video involving a theme by Shikao Suga, a singer who performed multiple themes for the xxxHolic animated adaptations.

The manga xxxHolic Rei features Yuko as the shop owner as Watanuki realizes that he is in parallel world and that Yuko of that world is a fake. Anne Watanabe plays Yuko in the 2012 live-action TV series, while Kou Shibasaki was cast for the role in 2022 live-action film.

== Reception ==
=== Popularity ===
Yuko's character has been well received by Japanese readers of the series. In two popularity polls held by Weekly Shōnen Magazine, she placed seventh among all the characters in Tsubasa: Reservoir Chronicle. In a xxxHolic poll, Yuko was featured as the third most popular character from the series. In Animage's Anime Grand Prix poll from 2007, she was voted as the thirteenth most popular female anime character. NTT customers voted her as their fourteenth favorite black-haired female anime character. Both World Cosplay Summit and Animate Times noted she was a highly popular character in Japan based on the several cosplay created by fans.

=== Critical response ===
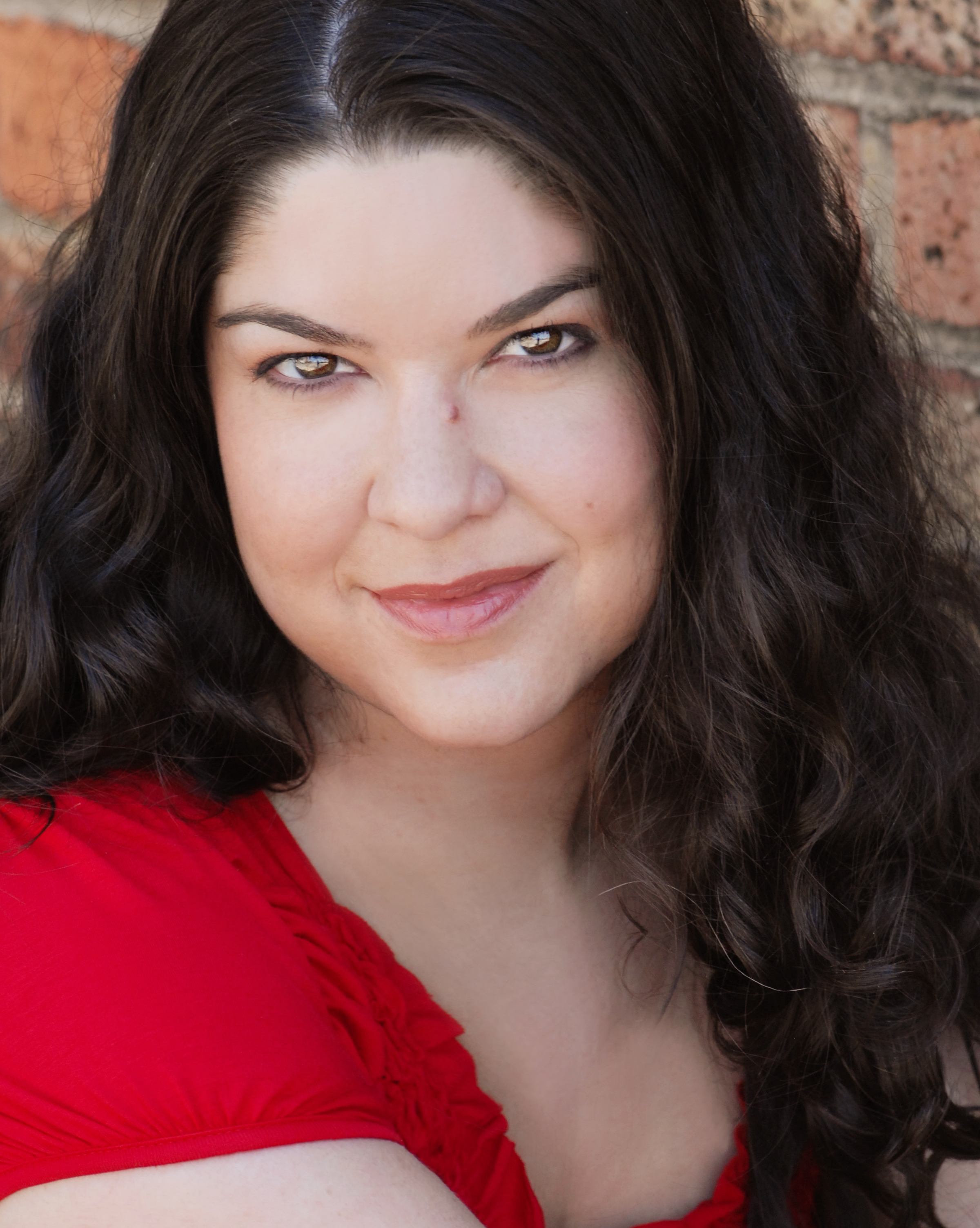
Colleen Clinkenbeard's work as Yuko's English voice was praised by critics.

Critical reception to the character's role in the story and traits has been positive. Carlo Santos of Anime News Network liked the character's philosophies about fate and realism as she manages to explain multiple aspects from the series "like a brilliant university professor." Megan Lavey from Mania Entertainment enjoyed how Yuko interacts with her clients and her sense of humor which involves multiple references. Across the series, Yuko grows close with Watanuki, and their development has been praised by Matthew Alexander from Mania Entertainment as Watanuki starts caring about Yuko's true desire as he realizes how much she cares for him. Johanna from Comics Worth Reading agreed with Alexander, while Ed Sizemore from the same site admitted having taken a liking to her due to her personality and the fact that she has "the wonderful sensuality of a Hollywood femme fatale from the 30s and 40s". Her death scene has been referred by Active Anime's Holly Ellingwood as "tragic, inspiring, and beautifully, breathtakingly sad" for its presentation. Santos noted that while the loss of Yuko could have negatively affected the series due to her impact, it managed to retain the same quality, as Watanuki inherited most of her distinctive traits. The character's role in xxxHolic Rei was the subject of mystery due to her supposed death but reviewers still felt this incarnation of Yuko appealing. The designs of the character were found memorable and compared to Princess Hinoto from X.

Critics have also commented in regards to the actresses who portrayed Yuko in the anime. Clinkenbeard was praised by writers from Anime News Network. UKAnime News praised both the talents of Clinkenbeard and Ohara when reviewing the anime. Richard Eisenbeis regarded Yuko's character as one of the portrayed once in the drama due to his to how faithful is her actress to the concept.

Santos liked the secret talks Yuko had with Sakura on the second half of Tsubasa: Reservoir Chronicle, as it gave the 19th volume of the manga one of the most interesting cliffhangers from the series even she is still a supporting character. He noted that Yuko's words might come across as confusing exposition. In the next review, he felt that while the cross-over between xxxHolic and Tsubasa was interesting to see due to the foreshadowing of her role in the latter's story. In the flashback from the Tsubasa finale, Yuko was praised for how she interacts with Fei-Wang and protects Syaoran and Watanuki from the sorcerer. As the series reached its climax, Active Anime and MangaNews enjoyed Yuko's development from a supporting character to one of the most important ones in the narrative.
