= Rhys Huber =

Canadian former voice actor

- Occupation: Retired voice actor
- Years active: 1993–2004

Rhys Huber is a Canadian former voice actor. He has done English-language voice work for both Western animation and anime. His most notable role is Li Showron in Cardcaptors.

== Filmography ==
- Cardcaptors as Li Showron
- Dragon Booster as Pyrahh's Brother (ep. 3)
- Nilus the Sandman as Gus (ep. 1)
- Rainbow Fish as Rainbow Fish
- Ranma ½ as Satori (ep. 135)
- Salty's Lighthouse as Salty
- Spider-Man Unlimited as Shayne Jones
- What About Mimi? as Russell Van Eden (seasons 1-2)
