= Sakura (Tsubasa: Reservoir Chronicle) =

Character from Tsubasa: Reservoir Chronicle

- Tsubasa: Reservoir Chronicle and xxxHolic character
- Sakura as seen in Tsubasa: Reservoir Chronicle
- First appearance: Tsubasa: Reservoir Chronicle chapitre 1 xxxHolic chapter 8
- Created by: Clamp
- Voiced by: Yui Makino (Japanese); Monica Rial (English)

In-universe information
- Alias: Princess Sakura
- Weapon: Feathers
- Relatives: Tsubasa (original self); Clow Reed (adoptive father); Tōya (adoptive brother); Syaoran (husband); Tsubasa (son); Kimihiro Watanuki (son)

Sakura (サクラ), also known as Princess Sakura (サクラ姫, Sakura Hime), is a fictional character and one of the protagonists from Tsubasa: Reservoir Chronicle, a manga series written and illustrated by Clamp. In the series, Sakura is a princess from the Kingdom of Clow who has her memories separated from her body and sent to parallel dimensions in the form of feathers. Finding Sakura catatonic and near death, Syaoran, her childhood friend, goes on a quest to recover her memories. As the journey continues, Sakura forms new bonds with Syaoran, and together they learn how the sorcerer Fei-Wang Reed was responsible for the loss of her memories and will benefit from their recovery. Besides Tsubasa: Reservoir Chronicle, Sakura also appears in other works from Clamp including xxxHolic and the drama CD series Holitsuba.

The character of Sakura and her relationship with Syaoran were both based on Sakura Kinomoto, the protagonist from Cardcaptor Sakura.

Her character has been well received by Japanese readers and audiences, appearing in various popularity polls not only from Tsubasa: Reservoir Chronicle but also for anime and manga series in general. She has also received praise from media publications for her personality, her relation with Syaoran, and her development across the series.

== Creation and conception ==
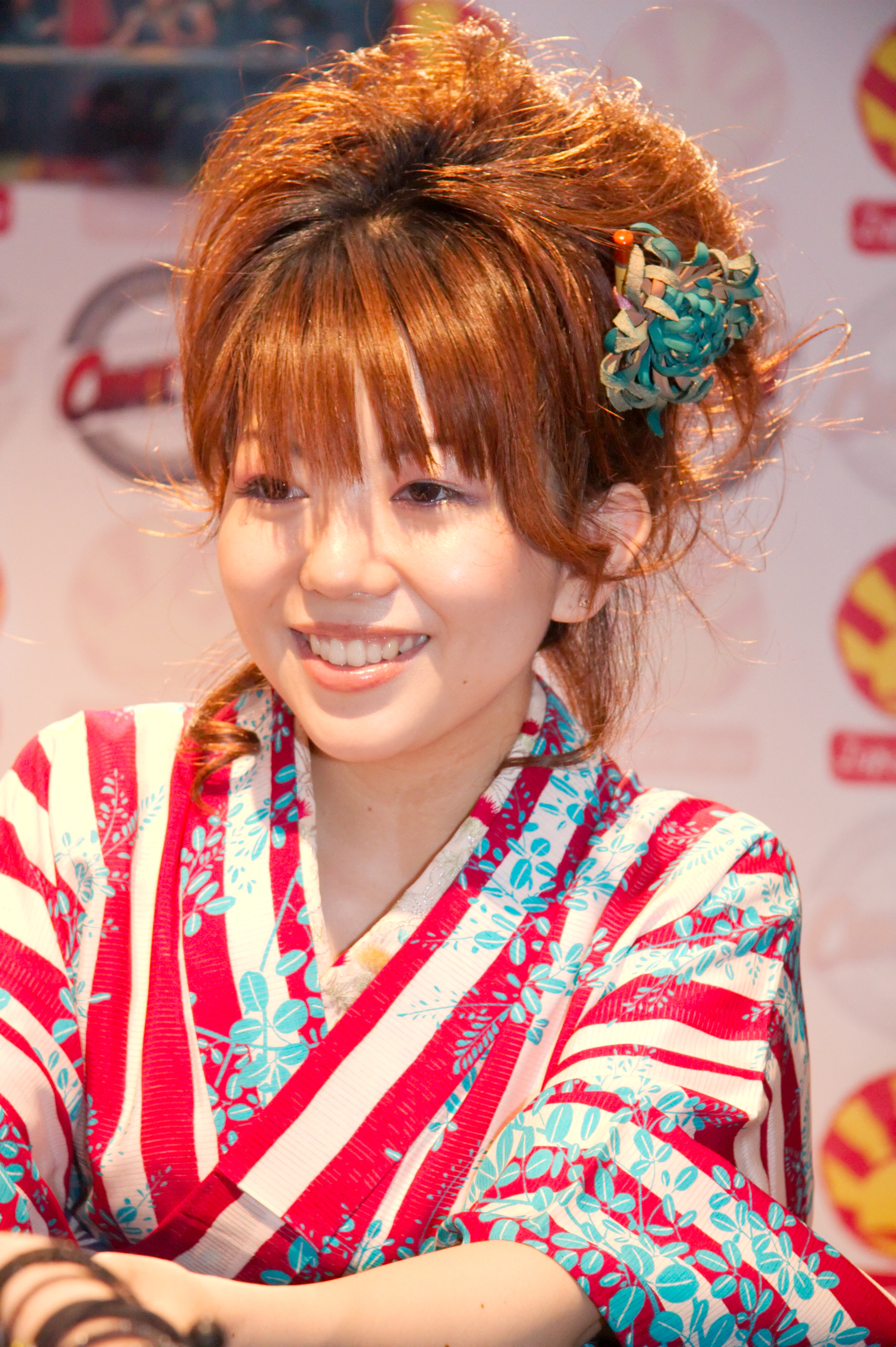
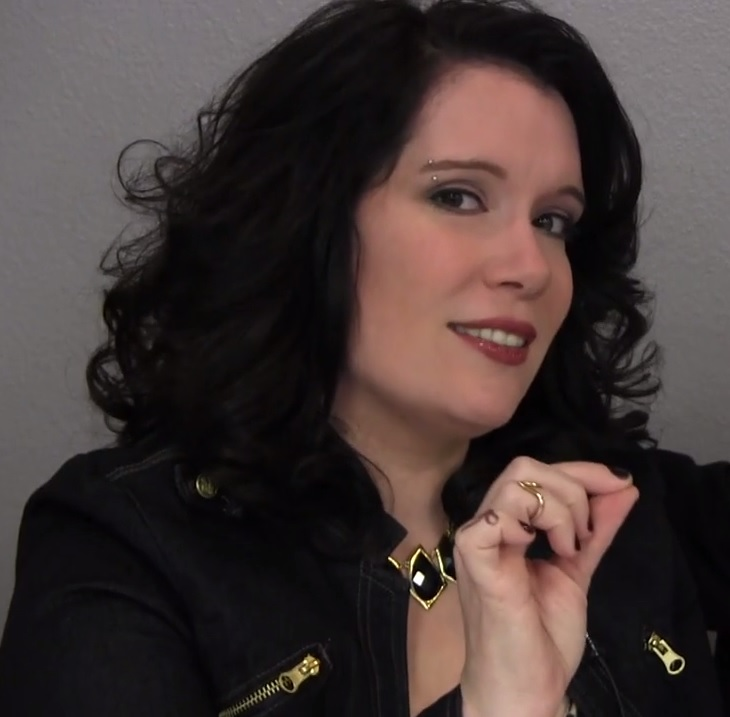
Sakura's Japanese voice, Yui Makino, and the English actor, Monica Rial

Similarly to the characters created by Osamu Tezuka and his Star System, Sakura was based on the protagonist of Clamp's previous manga Cardcaptor Sakura, Sakura Kinomoto, and her relationship with Syaoran Li. Both Sakura and Syaoran's counterparts from Cardcaptor Sakura had a happy ending; Clamp said that the Tsubasa protagonists would have to overcome trials throughout the series to get their "own happy ending". Sakura losing her memories of Syaoran and struggling to once again develop feelings for him is one of the main themes of Tsubasa: Reservoir Chronicle, showing the value of relationships throughout the series. Editor Kiichiro Sugawara commented that when Tsubasa started, most of his colleagues kept mentioning the series was interesting for having an alternate version of Sakura Kinomoto as he found that the original Syaoran Li was not popular within Cardcaptor Sakura.

Clamp aimed to make both of them equally different based on their actions despite being virtually identical. The usage of two characters with the same appearance was noted by Clamp to be a common elements in their stories, but Clamp also aimed to create another link between Syaoran, Sakura and Kimihiro Watanuki, the protagonist of xxxHolic. Nanase Ohkawa referred to both clones appearing in the series with the term "utsushimi" (写身) to make them look like a departure from the original English word that fans often mention, aiming for different take of the cloning.

Sakura is voiced by Yui Makino in the anime adaptation, and by Monica Rial in the English adaptation. Sakura's character was Makino's first work as a voice actress and she states she did not have to adjust her voice for that, finding the character similar to her. During the series' original video animations (OVAs), Makino mentioned that one of Sakura's scenes was very sad, and worked to make it appealing.

For the English dub, Sakura was voiced by Monica Rial. She enjoyed the series due to how cheerful are most of the cast and their visual appeal regardless of drama.

== Characterization and themes ==
Sakura is initially portrayed a shy and innocent teenager unable to tell Syaoran her romantic feelings. Sakura losing her memories of Syaoran and struggling to once again develop feelings for him is one of the main themes of Tsubasa: Reservoir Chronicle, showing the value of relationships throughout the series. When Syaoran and Sakura already met in the series' beginning, Sakura addressed Syaoran by his name without a Japanese suffix and wanted Syaoran to stop calling her princess. However, Syaoran realizes the present Sakura has no such affection towards him in the second story arc when talking. After Sakura loses her memories of Syaoran she struggles to once again develop feelings for him. However, when Sakura starts remembering her past thanks to the next feather, Syaoran becomes happier as he realizes that regardless of what happens to his memories, Sakura will always be the person he loves as he remembers that his own memories of his first meeting with Sakura comforted him for the first time before meeting his adoptive father, Fujitaka.

== Appearances ==
=== In Tsubasa: Reservoir Chronicle ===
First introduced in Tsubasa: Reservoir Chronicle, Sakura is the princess of the Kingdom of Clow. A force fragments her soul, including her memories, into feathers, which are scattered across various parallel worlds. To retrieve the feathers and save her life, she and Syaoran go to Yūko Ichihara, who gives them Mokona Modoki to help them travel to parallel worlds. The cost for her help is Sakura's memory of Syaoran, which causes him to be absent from any memories restored to her. Sakura is initially confused, and constantly tired, but she grows stronger as she regains her feathers. She becomes very friendly with the group's new members, Fai D. Flowright, Kurogane and Mokona, and she grows close to Syaoran again. Even though she notices that she has forgotten somebody from her memories, whenever Sakura realizes the one missing is Syaoran, her memories revert to before her realization. Over time, she also starts to recover various abilities, including seeing spirits of nature, ghosts, and visions of the future.

As the journey continues, Sakura comes to regard Syaoran as her most important person, but at the same time he betrays the group to Fei-Wang Reed, the sorcerer who can control him and created him based on another teenager. Sakura learns that Fei-Wang was responsible for scattering her memories and set up the journey to recover them for his own plans, but she still decides to continue in order to save Syaoran. From that point on, Sakura becomes very distant from the group, especially the newly arrived original Syaoran, because of his similarities to the clone whom she has come to know. When she sees a future involving Fai killing the original Syaoran as part of Fei-Wang's curse, Sakura attempts to change it and succeeds in taking Fai's place, in that moment sending her soul to the Dream World and her body to Celes. Her soul is destroyed by the Syaoran clone when trying to recover her feathers. Just before her death, Sakura reveals that she is a clone of the original Sakura and asks Syaoran to go back to his previous self. Fei-Wang created the clone Sakura to increase the power from the feathers, and as a backup in case the original Sakura died in the journey. After the destruction of her soul, the power stored in her soulless body is used by Fei-Wang as part of his plan to revive Yūko.

Since clones cannot properly die, the Sakura and Syaoran clones are reconstructed by Yūko, who wishes to compensate them for how their existences were used. She causes them to be reborn as humans, who eventually meet and start living together. Sakura gives birth to the original Syaoran and they realize they are in their own past. They raise him until it is time for him to begin the events of the series, then they seal themselves in a glass tube in order to await the time when Fei-Wang will attempt to shatter reality. After breaking free from the tube, Sakura and Syaoran reverse Fei-Wang's damage to the dimension using the magic they inherited from the sorcerer Clow Reed during their reincarnation. They disappear after Fei-Wang is killed by Kurogane, leaving behind only a feather which the original Sakura and Syaoran absorb.

=== In other media ===
Besides the manga and anime series from Tsubasa, Sakura also appears in the animated film Tsubasa Reservoir Chronicle the Movie: The Princess in the Birdcage Kingdom in which she still travels with Syaoran, Fai, Kurogane and Mokona across dimensions. She is also a playable character in the two Nintendo DS video games from Tsubasa. In the drama CD series, The Matinée of the Palace, the group performs a play that reenacts the series' story while searching for one of her feathers.

Outside Tsubasa, Sakura makes various appearances in Clamp's manga xxxHolic, showing some of the events happening in Tsubasa: Reservoir Chronicle. Sakura also appears in later volumes when her soul is separated from her body and sent to the Dream World. There, she meets Yūko's assistant, a teenager named Kimihiro Watanuki, whom she finds similar to the original Syaoran. One of her feathers – that of her memories of Syaoran – appears in Watanuki's world and gives the medium Kohane Tsuyuri the ability to exorcise spirits. After Kohane wishes for the removal of her ability, the feather stays with a black Mokona Modoki. Sakura does not appear in the animated adaptions of xxxHolic until the original video animations series xxxHolic Shunmuki, in which she appears in the Dream World talking with Watanuki.

The drama CD series Holitsuba Gakuen features Sakura as one of the students from the fictional school Holitsuba, which includes characters from both Tsubasa and xxxHolic.

== Reception ==
Singer Maaya Sakamoto wrote the anime's insert song "Spica" based on Sakura's character, describing how she moves forward across the series but still shows weakness at times. Various types of merchandising have also been made based on her appearance, such as plushes and keychains.

Sakura's character has been well received by publications for manga, anime and other media. While commenting on the series' protagonists, Ed Sizemore from Comics Worth Reading stated that Sakura had "natural grace and charm", indicating how she changes as the series continues. Comparing her with her Cardcaptor Sakura counterpart, Carl Kimlinger from Anime News Network found Sakura a likeable female lead character based on her personality and how she cares for others. Animefringe writer Lesley Smith commented that Sakura was "becoming a much larger character" the more feathers she recovered, but even so "her relationship with Syaoran can never be the same." Bryan Morton from Mania said Sakura's awakening from her comatose state helped to make the cast more entertaining. Sakura's change in the second half of the manga has also received many comments. Carlo Santos of Anime News Network called it a large improvement, as she starts manipulating events in order to obtain what she wants. Sakura Eries from the found Sakura's death in a later volume unexpected, due to how she sacrifices herself in order to stop the fight between the two Syaorans and the revelation of her status also surprised the reviewer. Manga News praised the ending for the heavy focus on the clones of Syaoran and Sakura, giving emotional scenes, as well as their relationship Yuko and Fei-Wang Reed, but lamented Fai and Kurogane for having less prominent roles.

Sakura's relationship with Syaoran and the way in which she begins caring for him again even without her memories has often been described as one of the series' strongest points. Carlo Santos stated that the relationship even makes up for the issues in the anime, while Active Anime's Christopher Seaman found such a romantic relationship one of the most mature developments of the series. IGN's N.S. Davidson mentioned that the series would still be appealing to those who dislike romance, because of the "haunting" situation of these two characters. Megan Lavey called it a "pretty simple love story", but liked their personalities though. Sarahi Isuki Castella Olivera from Benemérita Universidad Autónoma de Puebla said the audience is tricked with the handling of protagonists as both Sakura and Syaoran turn out to be clones of two other characters. While the original Sakura does not appear until late into the series, the design she possesses is nearly identical to the clone, often confusing readers. However, their different upbringing and connections led them to have their own identity with the clones loving each other regardless of Sakura losing her memories.

Sakura has been popular among readers of the series, placing second among all the characters in Tsubasa: Reservoir Chronicle in a popularity poll held by Weekly Shōnen Magazine in 2005 right behind the Syaoran clone. She took a lower spot in the following poll behind Fai and the Syaoran clone, but has maintained a high ranking in other related polls from the series. In the Animage's Anime Grand Prix poll from 2006, Sakura was voted as the fifth most popular female anime character, and the following year she was seventh. In the Animedia "2006 Animedia Character Awards", Sakura ranked highly in several of its categories. The most notable include second place in the categories "Most Beautiful / Loveliest Character Award" and "Most Heroic Character Award".
