= Kimihiro Watanuki =

Fictional character introduced in the manga xxxHolic

- xxxHolic character
- Kimihiro Watanuki as illustrated by Clamp
- First appearance: xxxHolic chapter 1 (2003)
- Created by: Clamp
- Voiced by: Japanese; Jun Fukuyama; English; Todd Haberkorn
- Portrayed by: Shōta Sometani (drama); Ryūnosuke Kamiki (film)

In-universe information
- Relatives: Tsubasa (alternative self); Syaoran (father); Sakura (mother); Clow Reed (ancestor)

Kimihiro Watanuki (Japanese: 四月一日 君尋, Hepburn: Watanuki Kimihiro) is a fictional character introduced in the manga xxxHolic, created by the group of manga artists known as Clamp. Watanuki is a high school student plagued by his ability to see spirits. In order to lose such powers, Watanuki begins to work for Yūko Ichihara, a witch who will grant his wish once he pays the price for her services. Such jobs often involve Watanuki encountering other spirits attracted by him. Apart from xxxHolic, Watanuki is featured in the crossover manga Tsubasa: Reservoir Chronicle, which explores his origins. He has also been featured in their animated adaptations, spin-offs as well as other works by Clamp, most notably the sequel xxxHolic Rei.

The character was created by Clamp to fill their need for a main character who would observe Yūko's work and learn from her supernatural activities. Jun Fukuyama voiced the character in Japanese, and Todd Haberkorn did so in English. To indicate Watanuki's growth, the anime staff asked Fukuyama in later animated works as well as the film. Shōta Sometani portrays the character in the television drama.

Kimihiro Watanuki initially generated mixed responses from manga and anime publications, whose reviews criticised his behaviour, while his maturity and wiser characterisation in later chapters was better received. Similarly, his return in the spin-off xxxHolic Rei also earned a positive response for friendlier interactions with the cast, despite acting like his younger persona.

== Creation and development ==
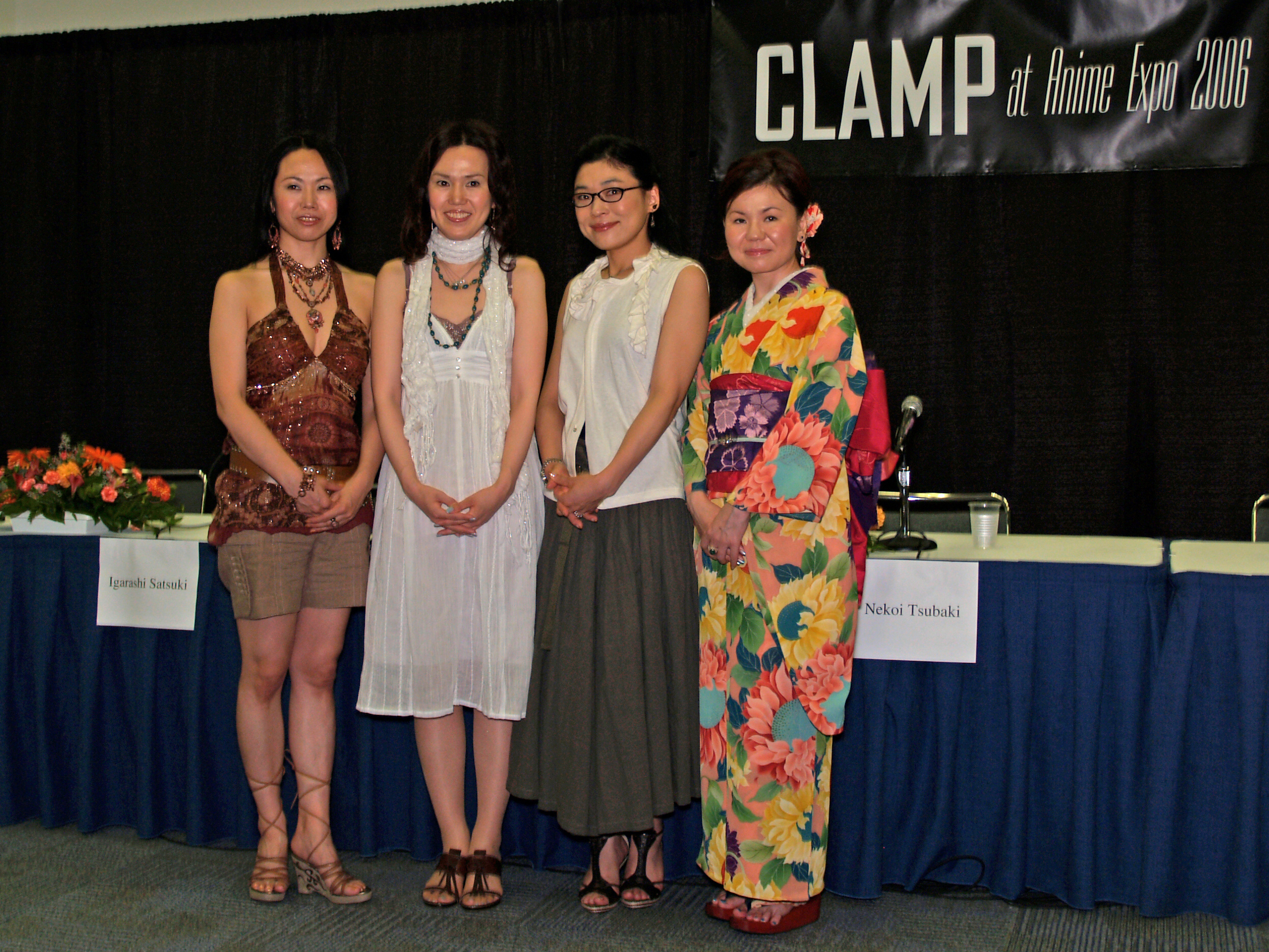
The four Clamp artists (from left to right): Satsuki Igarashi, Nanase Ohkawa, Mick Nekoi, and Mokona Apapa created Watanuki

With the manga xxxHolic being conceptualized as the Clamp manga that would connect to other works produced by them, its authors sought to create a character who would fit into the role of protagonist. They initially created Yūko Ichihara; they believed Yūko was so interesting she could be the series' sole main character but felt the need of having an additional. Such character would see Yūko's life and could ask her about the supernatural events. This led to the creation of Kimihiro Watanuki. The dynamic between Yūko and Watanuki was inspired respectively with Doraemon and Nobita Nobi from the manga series Doraemon. Unlike Yūko, Watanuki's personality and design were not difficult to write or illustrate by the manga authors. He is based on a real beautician the Clamp have not identified.

The protagonist of Tsubasa, Syaoran, has his own doppelgänger commonly referred to as "The Other Syaoran", who at the same time is deeply connected with Watanuki for reasons that are revealed late in Tsubasa. Across the series, these characters are developed and choose their own paths to establish their own identities. The constant interactions between Watanuki and the Other Syaoran were made to build up why both of these characters are important in their respective series as well as to explore more the crossover element Tsubasa has with xxxHolic. While the two meet in the first series, they do not have personal conversations until the climax and the sequels through their friends, the two creatures known as Mokona Modokis.

Anime Director Tsutomu Mizushima of Production I.G referred to Watanuki as his favorite character from the series because of his personality, saying that he identifies with him. He also commented on Watanuki's characterisation as having a notable arc while still retaining his attractive design known in Japanese as bishōnen. The staff commented that one of the biggest attractions of the series is Watanuki's skills as a chef as they are well-illustrated and well-animated in the anime. This is most notable in his new way of acting, resulting in the development of a quieter personality years after Yūko's death. Producer Toru Kawaguchi was surprised with Watanuki's development in the narrative despite the difficulties handling his character. Voice actress Sayaka Ohara said that thanks to Yūko's teachings about fate, Watanuki could grow up as an individual.

=== Casting ===
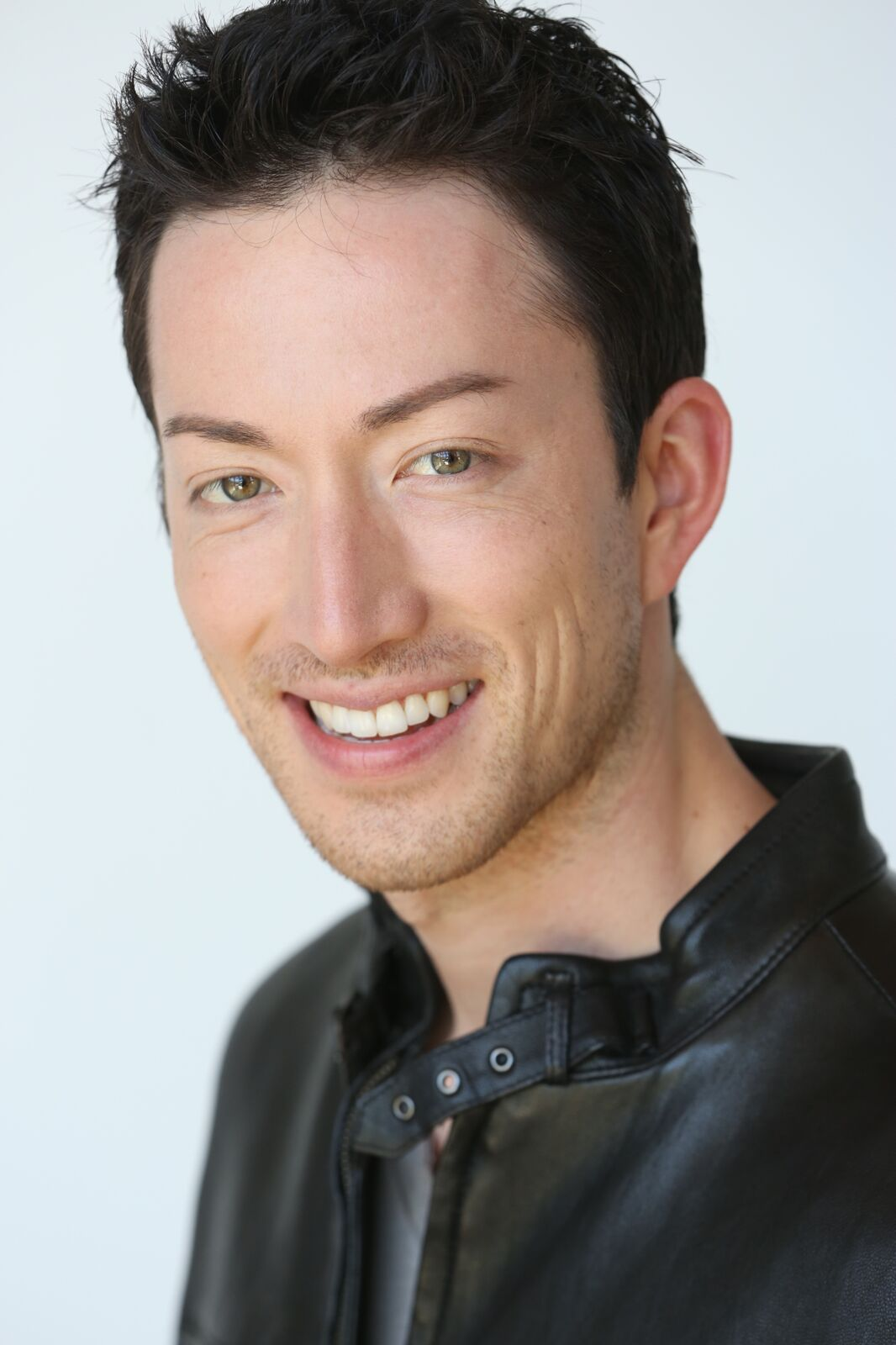
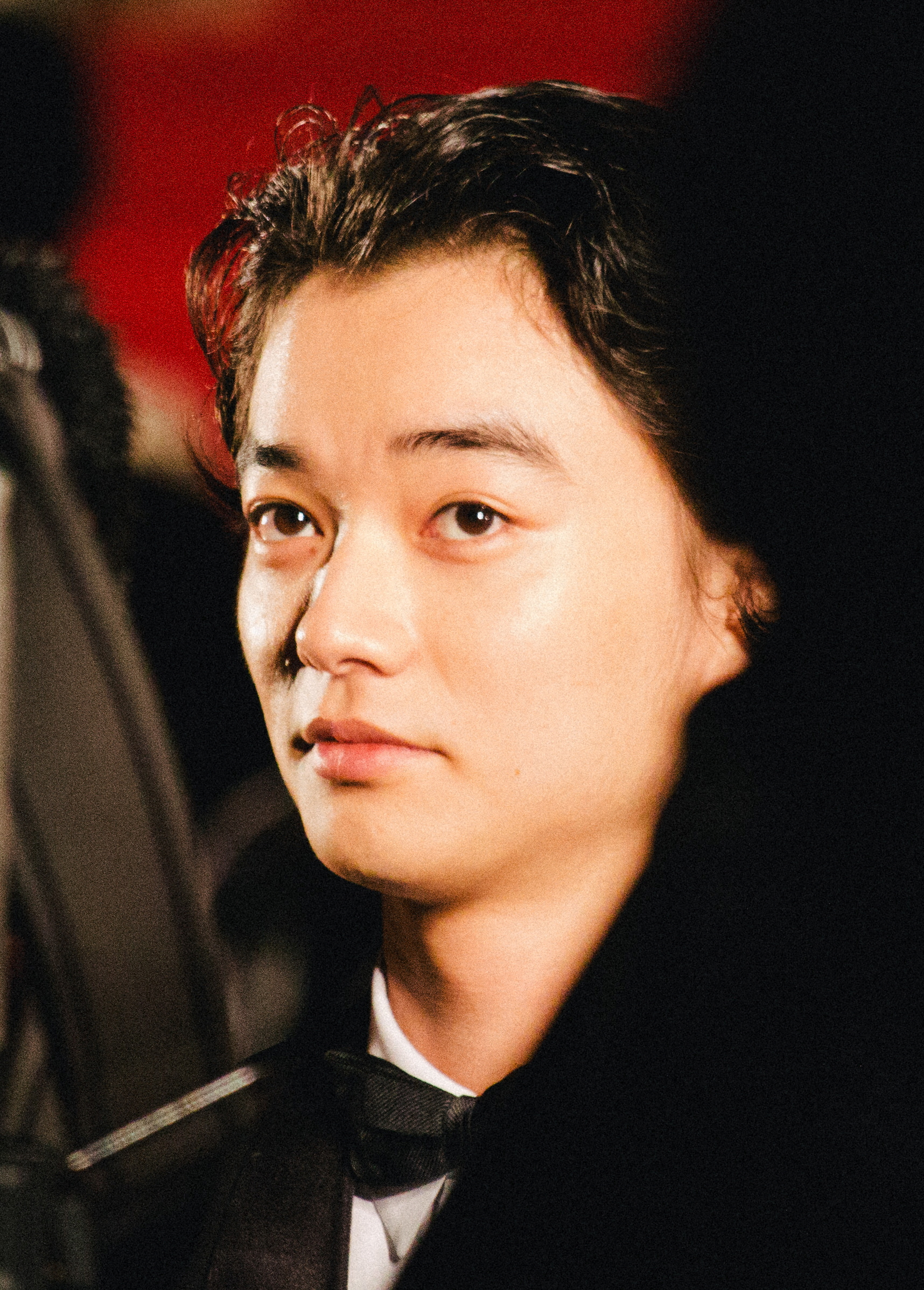
The voice actors for Watanuki include Jun Fukuyama in Japanese and Todd Haberkorn in the English dub. Shota Sometani portrays him the live-action drama.

In Japanese, Jun Fukuyama voices Watanuki. He was first cast for Bee Train's adaptation of Tsubasa but had no problem in contrast to Yūko's actress. Fukuyama was attracted by how his character was often part of the tsukkomi, a Japanese inspired comedy gag where Watanuki acts irritated when dealing with people most notably Yūko. He also enjoyed interacting with the main cast and thus was glad that the series spawned the sequel, xxxHolic Kei. In casting Fukuyama, the producers had him try a more innocent tone, in contrast to other roles he had played. When first cast to voice Watanuki, the differences between his character and Yūko's surprised Fukuyama. Although Fukuyama noted Watanuki tends to get irritated, he still had multiple traits that appealed to him. During the first audition, Fukuyama was looking forward to his role and was pleased when he was hired. Fukuyama regarded Watanuki as an audience surrogate lead because of his interactions with Yūko and the rest of the cast. Fukuyama aimed to work originally in Tsubasa based on Watanuki's role and felt in retrospective that he also enjoyed xxxHolic during its debut. His role in xxxHolic Rō also impressed the actor based on how much Watanuki changed because of his work as the shop's owner to the point the audience would want another sequel focused on Watanuki.

During the ending of the anime by Production I.G, an episode focused on Watanuki's childhood that moved multiple members of the staff. Fukuyama was impressed by it and expressed curiosity about what happened if something else took place that was not shown to the audience. Fukuyama enjoyed his work and felt nostalgic for it years after the final original video animation was released. For the character's role in Blood-C: The Last Dark, Fukuyama needed to portray Watanuki as a mature despite not aging from his appearance in xxxHolic.

Todd Haberkorn voices him in the English dub of the anime series. Haberkorn said that Watanuki would be the most ridiculed character in his career based on how he often ran away from yokais something that other characters he voiced are in charge of doing.

In the live-action drama, Shōta Sometani plays the character of Watanuki. He regarded his character as dignified based on his knowledge of the series and thus felt pressure in portraying him. Nevertheless, he expressed gratitude other members of the staff assisted him, including the director and Anne Watanabe who portrayed Yūko. Clamp also looked forward to the appearances of Watanuki and Yūko in the live-action version.

== Appearances ==
=== In xxxHolic and Tsubasa: Reservoir Chronicle ===
Watanuki is a high school student who has the ability to see spirits, and the result disturbs him. One day he stumbles, seemingly by chance, upon the wish-granting shop of Yūko Ichihara. She promises to end his ability to see spirits if he works part time in her shop until his work equals the value of his wish. Since he lives by himself, he can cook and clean, which pleases Yūko. Besides doing domestic tasks for Yūko, Watanuki often completes jobs of a spiritual or magical nature. Yuko's often insane requests usually enrage him, though he pays close attention whenever she is serious with him. While around his crush, Himawari Kunogi, Watanuki is usually cheerful and excited, whereas around Shizuka Dōmeki he is much more irritable. Yūko advises Watanuki to become closer to Dōmeki though, as he can exorcise spirits.

In the course of his work, Watanuki encounters spirits who take his right eye for the destruction of a web. He then shares Dōmeki's eyesight, which allows him to detect evil spirits. As thanks for his services, the spirits give Watanuki a protective pet fox named Kudagitsune. He meets a young medium named Kohane Tsuyuri and attempts to bring her a new life after learning how much abuse she has suffered. After nearly dying falling from his school's second floor, Watanuki learns he is related to a teenager named Syaoran, who paid Yūko for his health along with Himawari and Dōmeki. Watanuki learns this happened because of her bad luck, but still wishes to be with her, confessing his feelings for her while healing.

In xxxHolic and Tsubasa: Reservoir Chronicle, it is revealed Syaoran created to replace his identity after he decided to turn back time. Syaoran paid the price with his imprisonment by the sorcerer Fei-Wang Reed. As a result, Watanuki became the child of Syaoran's parents and filled all the relationships Syaoran would have had. Filled with guilt, Watanuki gave up the memories of his past as the price to find Fei-Wang and help Syaoran. As he could not remember his parents, Watanuki's developed dark feelings, which led to spirits to chase him. Across the story, Watanuki overcomes his selfishness and becomes concerned about granting Yūko's wish. Watanuki's origins and interactions with Syaoran are also explored in Tsubasa: Reservoir Chronicle where Syaoran constantly tell Watanuki to develop his will to live. When Yūko dies, Watanuki resolves to take care of the shop so he can wait for her return. During the climax of Tsubasa, Watanuki and Syaoran have to pay a price to survive Fei-Wang's dying curse with Watanuki's price being the "time in him", meaning he will never age.

Following Yūko's death, Watanuki becomes the new master of the shop and takes up Yūko's job of granting wishes to the shop's customers during the last volumes of xxxHolic subtitled xxxHolic Rō. His personality changes as he adopts some of Yūko's quirks and habits in order for his body to remember her, afraid of forgetting her. He is also unable to leave the shop, the price he paid to become the owner. Over the following years, Watanuki's powers become stronger, since he retains his ability to see spirits. He works with help from Dōmeki, who brings him materials from the outside along with Kohane. However, Watanuki has to cut ties with Himawari because of the way her bad luck would affect the shop. In the manga's finale, Watanuki has a dream of Yūko that serves as a message that Watanuki has become able to leave the shop thanks to his growing powers. Realizing it has been over a century, he instead decides to remain in the shop, still waiting to see Yūko visits again in person rather than in a dream.

=== Other appearances ===
Outside the xxxHolic and Tsubasa manga, Watanuki appears in the film xxxHolic: A Midsummer Night's Dream (2005), where he visits a collector's mansion and investigates the mystery behind multiple disappearances. The video game xxxHolic ~Watanuki no Izayoi Sowa~ also features Watanuki. He is also a prominent character in the novelization Another Holic by Nisio Isin. In the original video animation (OVA) xxxHolic Rō, Watanuki, as the new shop's owner, receives a tape with Yūko's voice. In the second OVA, Adayume, the spirit of Dōmeki's grandfather, Haruka, asks Watanuki to investigate his grandson's dreams now that his son is marrying Kohane. Accepting Haruka's constant teachings as his payment, Watanuki later meets Dōmeki, who tells him that Kohane's most important person is Watanuki, regardless of marriage. In August 2011, Clamp wrote the one-shot xxxHolic Shi, where Watanuki meets real life singer Shikao Suga, who performed multiple themes for the xxxHolic animated adaptations. Suga wishes to become more famous, but Watanuki makes the singer become confused about the price needed for that.

Watanuki appears as the protagonist of the manga xxxHolic Rei as Yūko's assistant. While seeing several of Yūko's cases, Watanuki realises his boss is waiting for him to make a decision that he ignores. He remembers he is living in an alternate dimension where Yuko is not dead. After saying goodbye to her, Watanuki returns to reality to give Syaoran a group of items he found in the alternative world. In Tsubasa World Chronicle, he meets Syaoran and gives him the items, but is saddened having to lose Yūko again. Shota Sometani plays Watanuki in the live action TV series.

He also appears in other works from Clamp, including the seventeenth episode of the anime adaptation of Kobato, where he receives a package from one of the series' characters. In the book Soel and Larg: The Adventures of Mokona Modoki, he awakens the two creatures known as Mokona Modoki. One of them stays in the shop while the other is used by protagonists from Tsubasa. Other works include a CD drama where Yūko tells Watanuki how she created the two Mokonas with a sorcerer named Clow Reed. In the manga Drug and Drop, he hires its two protagonists for a job involving an encounter with a supernatural being. In Blood-C anime series, he appears as a dog contacting the protagonist Saya Kisaragi. He meets in person in the feature film Blood-C: The Last Dark (2012) where he grants her wish to obtain a new sword. In the Holitsuba CD drama series, Watanuki appears as a high school student from the titular school. In December 2015, Clamp collaborated with Victor Entertainment to create a music video involving a theme by Suga. Clamp drew Watanuki and Yūko, who feature in the video.

== Reception ==
Initial reactions to Watanuki led to Clamp illustrator Tsubaki Nekoi find that Watanuki was very popular with female readers. Nekoi believed this was because of his kind-hearted personality rather than his appearance, while head writer, Nanase Ohkawa, felt it was because of his multiple skills. In a xxxHolic poll published in The Official xxxHOLiC Guide from 2009, readers voted Watanuki the most popular character in the series.

Critical reception to the character has been generally positive. Although Polley Dan of Manga Life felt Watanuki seemed "a little bit weak to be the lead character", he and Ed Sizemore of Comics Worth Reading found that his interactions with other characters and his development across the series as elements to be praised. Matthew Alexander of Mania Entertainment liked most notably how caring he became towards Yuko's as he wonders about her. Manga News was harsher, stating that Watanuki lacks depth and sensitivity, describing him as superficial with a "humorous side, bordering on hysteria". Carlos Santos from Anime News Network criticised Todd Haberkorn's work as Watanuki's English voice actor for making the character sound annoying rather than funny. When the manga revealed that Watanuki is related to Tsubasa: Reservoir Chronicle's lead Syaoran, critics looked forward to Watanuki's role in Tsubasa too. Despite Tsubasa: Reservoir Chronicle ending, MangaNews stated that readers should check xxxHolic as it was still being written as such series had yet to finish Watanuki's story. In regards to how Watanuki's relationship with Domeki is handled, Kathryn Hemmann said it is widely discussed and accepted by Japanese fans of the series. Japanese fans have drawn several dōjinshi fan manga that imagine this relationship as open and explicit, something common within several apparent relationships explored in Clamp manga.

The Manga News site praised Yūko's death in xxxHolic because of the newfound will to live Watanuki finds in her last moments. Manga News claims that Watanuki became a tragic character in the finale because of his loneliness, as his close friends died while he kept the shop, still waiting for Yuko's return. Clamp received multiple letters from fans who were saddened by Watanuki's decision to remain in the shop in self-exile, even after one hundred years, rather than return to society when given the option. Clamp were pleased with the readers' comments, realizing people cared for the character's fate. As a result, Clamp clarified that the self-exile was the happiness Watanuki wanted.

Manga Bookshelf found Watanuki as a realistic teenager due to how he has a tendency of becoming irritated in contrast to another of Clamp's characters, Subaru Sumeragi from Tokyo Babylon, who is portrayed as a character who lacks his self values and is generally calm when interacting with his friends. In early chapters, Watanuki is portrayed as lonely child who attracted a spirit and befriended him. The inclusion of spirits being attracted to him is also a major theme in the series as it contrasts his lives with humans. However, Watanuki is deeply connected with his classmate Shizuka Domeki who assists him during problems. In once occasion, Domeki is forced to exorcise a spirit that is socializing with Watanuki at the same time his health is drained. Watanuki coming in terms with Domeki's actions serves as a major focus on his growth in the narrative.

Although xxxHolic is classified as seinen manga (aimed towards adults), Watanuki is still compared with a more traditional shōjo manga character in the book Manga Cultures and the Female Gaze, as scholar Kathryn Hemmann finds that his portrayal and design make him more suitable for female readers. The same book listed him as an opposite to Sakura Kinomoto from Cardcaptor Sakura due to how different are their lives despite sharing similar traits, placing emphasis on Watanuki's loneliness. Domeki is also seen as another opposite to Watanuki due to their different built and linked their close bond to that of a shōjo manga romance. As the narrative passes, Yuko makes a major bond with Watanuki who is interested in granting her own wish instead. Hemmann further argued that while taking Yūko's role, he surpassed the "gendered limitations of [her] role", which was cast as a gendered archetype of a witch. Watanuki's changed characterization following Yūko's death was commented multiple times, with critics finding him to act similar to his mentor, and more mature, making him a fitting new protagonist. Similar to how Watanuki was compared to the teenager Subaru from Tokyo Babylon, his older persona was compared with the adult Subaru from the ending of Tokyo Babylon and X as both became similar to the people they loved but still suffer from grief as time passes.

The portrayal of Watanuki in the spin-off xxxHolic: Rei was the subject of mystery based on how he is most active by The Fandom Post and Anime News Network. His relationship with his two friends remains awkward according to them, based on how they act suspicious of his actions. This led the writers to the point it felt like this reboot might attract older fans. Nevertheless, both reviews as and Comic Worth Reading felt that Watanuki's actions were appealing. Kotaku's Richard Eisenbeis was critical of the Watanuki's cameo in the Blood-C: The Last Dark movie, describing it as low-quality fan service. Eisenbeis felt Shōta Sometani's portrayal of Watanuki's character was appropriate, but believed Anne Watanabe who played Yūko overshadowed him.
