= Syaoran Li =

Fictional character from Cardcaptor Sakura

- Cardcaptor Sakura character
- Syaoran Li in his magic robes, illustration by Clamp
- First appearance: Chapter 6 (manga)
- Created by: Clamp
- Voiced by: Japanese Motoko Kumai; English Rhys Huber (Nelvana dub [Clow Card arc], 1st film) Jordan Kilik (Nelvana dub [Sakura Card arc]) Mona Marshall (2nd film) Candice Moore (Animax dub) Jason Liebrecht (Clear Card arc)

In-universe information
- Aliases: Shaoran Li; Li Xiaolang; Li Showron
- Weapon: Jian; Fulu; Compass; Cards
- Family: Yelan Li (mother); Fuutie Li, Shiefa Li, Fanren Li, and Feimei Li (older sisters); Meiling Li (cousin); Wang Wei (guardian)
- Significant other: Sakura Kinomoto (girlfriend)
- Origin: Hong Kong

Syaoran Li

Chinese name
- Chinese: 李小狼
Transcriptions
Standard Mandarin
- Hanyu Pinyin: Lǐ Xiǎoláng
Yue: Cantonese
- Jyutping: Lei5 Siu2 Long4

Japanese name
- Katakana: リ・シャオラン
Transcriptions
- Romanization: Ri Shaoran (Hepburn); Ri Syaoran (Kunrei-shiki)

Syaoran Li, sometimes spelled as Shaoran Li or originally as Li Xiaolang (李小狼), is one of the central characters in the Clamp manga series Cardcaptor Sakura. In the English anime adaptation by Nelvana of the series, Cardcaptors, he was renamed Li Showron and in the American broadcast was rewritten to be the joint main protagonist alongside Sakura Kinomoto, despite Sakura's solo lead role in all other regional conversions.

Syaoran is a young Chinese sorcerer from Hong Kong and an indirect descendant of Clow Reed who arrives in Tokyo in order to capture the missing Clow Cards released by Sakura. Although Syaoran is initially apprehensive towards Sakura due to their shared goal, he finds himself falling in love with her as the series progresses. Their relationship is further explored in the film Cardcaptor Sakura Movie 2: The Sealed Card (2000) and the sequel series Cardcaptor Sakura: Clear Card.

Syaoran was created by Clamp as a common archetype of silent but caring male characters often depicted in their works. However, Syaoran's traits and relationship with Sakura were noted to be positive within the demography of the manga's magazine. Reception to the character was originally mixed, with criticism primarily directed at his initial role and alterations during the localization process. The further development of the character, however, was noted to make him more mature and appealing. The character's design was used for the two main characters of Clamp's manga Tsubasa: Reservoir Chronicle who share the same name: the dimension traveller Syaoran and the young sorcerer Syaoran who replaces him in the second half.

== Creation and conception ==
According to the Clamp no Kiseki interviews, Syaoran was created before Cardcaptor Sakura debuted, with him being the third character created, behind Sakura and Tomoyo Daidouji. While the character comes from Hong Kong, he was originally going to be Japanese. Syaoran and Toya were conceived to be a common type of character featured in Clamp's works of acting cold but are instead charming. Ohkawa was careful when writing Syaoran's characterization in the early chapters due to how he felt attracted towards Yukito but did not have the same type of love Sakura had towards him. In regards to how Syaoran and Sakura ended together, Ohkawa was glad the readers' response were together and claimed it was not because of their age or gender. In general, Clamp found that Syaoran ended up as an attractive character that could be their younger brother due to his independency mostly as pointed out by Mokona and Nekoi.

When Sakura believes she will never find the person she loves, Syaoran comforts her by denying such possibility and gives her his handkerchief to stop her tears. Syaoran's popularity within the demography suddenly increased due to his kindness aimed towards the main character. Ohkawa compared Syaoran to that of a strong prince in order to describe his charm to the point male readers also related with him due to their mutual feelings towards Sakura.

For all Japanese-language productions of the anime (including films, audio CDs, and video games), Syaoran is voiced by Motoko Kumai. Kumai said that even though Syaoran grows up for the sequel Clear Card, she still wanted to properly portray him despite their different genders and thus would change the tone she uses when voicing him.

In the Nelvana Cardcaptors version of the series, Sayoran was voiced by Rhys Huber for the "Clow Card" arc of the story and the first film; by Jordan Kilik for the "Sakura Card" arc; and Mona Marshall for the second film, The Sealed Card. In a later dub by Animax, Syaoran was voiced by Candice Moore. In Clear Card, he is voiced by Jason Liebrecht, having previously voiced two different versions of the same character in Tsubasa: Reservoir Chronicle.

== Characterization and themes ==
Syaoran is introduced as a distant child who is rude towards Sakura for both having the same goal. Both also develop feelings towards Yukito but Syaoran's attraction is said to be a cause of his magic being affected by Yukito's alterego, Yue. Similarly, Syaoran realizes his math teacher Kaho Mizuki has magic and thus tells Sakura to be distant towards her. As time passes in the narrative, Syaoran becomes interested in Sakura taking a more caring personality in the process as well as mentor whenever she is concerned. Syaoran is charmed by her, causing him to constantly blush whenever she talks to him. A big revelation of his affection towards her happens when Syaoran uses her name for the first time as he has a tendency to avoid using people's names. Syaoran constantly wonders whether his feelings towards Sakura and Yukito are true as which changes when Yue notes that his attraction with other types of magic caused his crush on Yukito which serves as an early coming-of-age. Writer Kiyoshi Saiga says that the emphasis of Syaoran's and Sakura's feelings were made due to the young demography of the manga. Once Syaoran confesses his love towards Sakura, the series places emphasis on the fact that Sakura is interested in him.

== Appearances ==
=== In Cardcaptor Sakura ===
Syaoran first appears in Chapter 6 of the manga (Volume 2 of the standard tankobon collections). He is a transfer student to Sakura Kinomoto's class, arriving from Hong Kong. He, like Sakura, is capable of using magic and tries to force Sakura to hand over the Clow Cards to him, but fails. Over time, Syaoran comes to accept Sakura as the collector of the cards, and as the story progresses the two fall in love. Syaoran is also at first drawn to Yukito Tsukishiro, but this was because he was drawn to Yukito's own magic power. The series ends with Syaoran returning to Hong Kong, but before he departs he and Sakura are able to express their love for each other. Sakura and Syaoran are reunited two years later, with Syaoran staying in Japan.

In the anime version of the series, Syaoran (called "Brat" by Kero, who also refers to Meiling as such) also has a cousin, Meiling Li. Meiling says she is engaged to be married to Syaoran, but as the series progresses she comes to realise that he will be with Sakura. When the series was first dubbed in English as Cardcaptors, Syaoran was renamed Li Showron, and the show re-written to make him the joint lead with Sakura, partly up to attract a male audience who it was perceived would not want to watch an anime with a female lead.

=== In Cardcaptor Sakura: Clear Card ===
Clear Card begins with Syaoran having returned from Hong Kong and staying in Japan. When Sakura loses her cards, Syaoran again helps her to recover them.

During a Clamp Twitter Space discussion that took place in April 2024, a month after the final chapter of Clear Card was published in Japan, Clamp were asked if they had plans to write another story arc featuring Sakura and Syaoran; perhaps one that featured their wedding. In response, series writer Nanase Ohkawa expressed uncertainty about showing Sakura and Syaoran's wedding, expressing her view that "it'd be best for everyone to imagine Sakura and Syaoran's wedding in their own hearts", but did not rule out the possibility of a follow-up to Clear Card.

=== Appearances in other media ===
Two alternative versions of Syaoran, commonly referred to as the clone Syaoran and the original Syaoran, appear in Clamp's later work Tsubasa: Reservoir Chronicle, a series which features multiple versions of past Clamp characters in different worlds. Although Syaoran Li does not appear in the manga, he is mentioned by the clone Syaoran who states that a mage who shares his same identity provides him a vase to seal the two clones for determined time to face their creator, the wizard Fei-Wang Reed.

== Reception ==
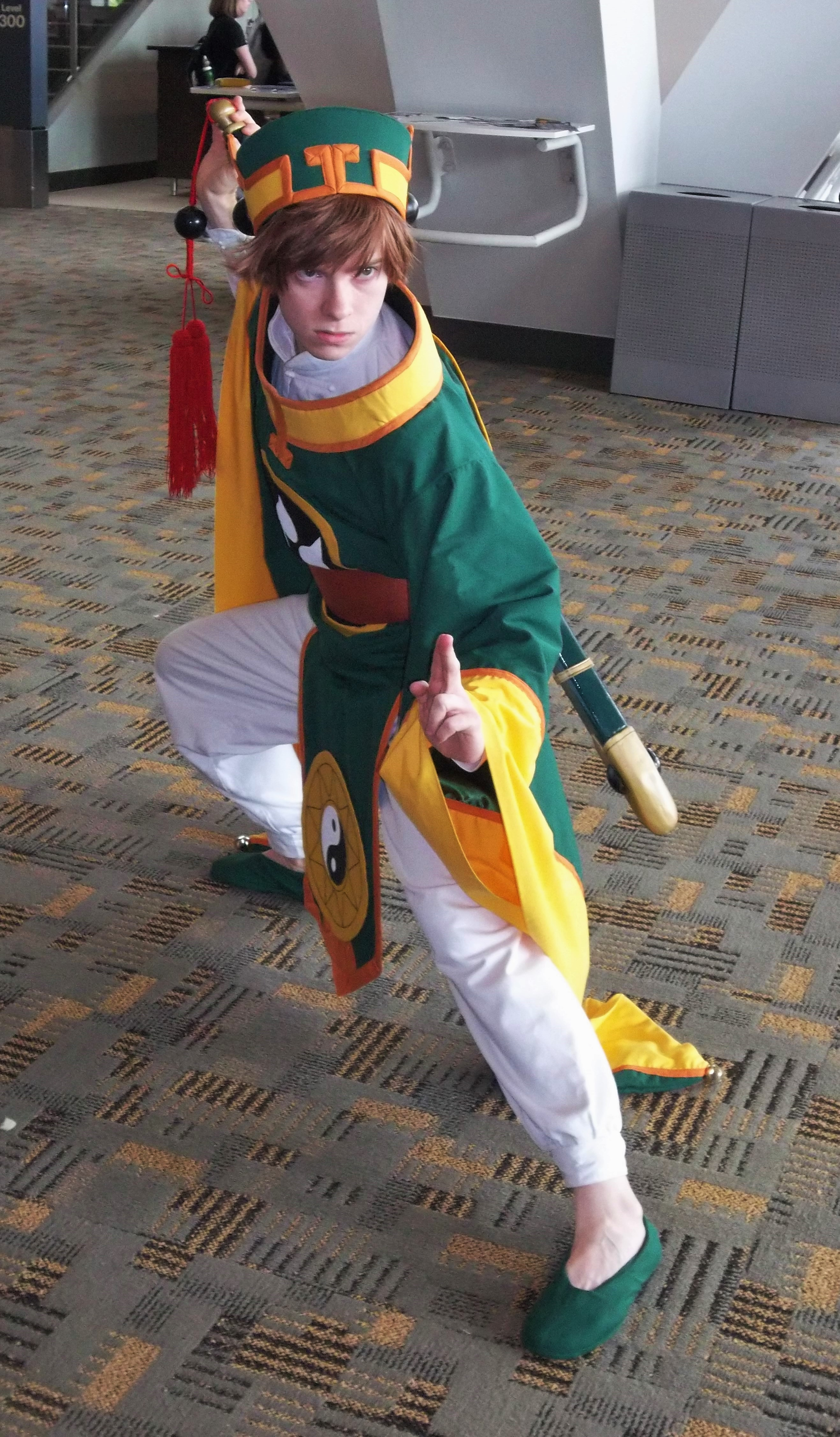
A Syaoran Li cosplayer

Syaoran has been a popular character. In the 1999 Animage Grand Prix, the character took the third place in the category of best male character, and second in 2000. In the June 2018 issue of Newtype magazine, Syaoran was No. 1 in the monthly poll of "Top 10 Male Characters", with Sakura being No. 1 in the "Top 10 Female Characters" poll at the same time.

When first introduced, Anime News Network described Syaoran as a "jerk" for how he competes against Sakura to get the Clow Cards, but found it more surprising how he additionally becomes her rival, also in terms of affection as both characters are attracted to Yukito Tsukishiro. When Syaoran becomes attracted to Sakura, the writer instead noted that Syaoran acted less than a bully towards to her and instead awkward to the point he blushes often. Similarly, the writers from The Japanification of Children's Popular Culture: From Godzilla to Miyazaki said that Syaoran becomes a weak awkward friend to Sakura as he is unable to confess her feelings towards her to the point being a comic relief. In an episode involving a play, Syaoran crossdresses, something the Western audience would not understand by that time of writing the book. DVDTalk said that Syaoran's characterization changes across the narrative due to how he is initially presented as a rival but later is more supporting to the protagonist. In regards to the Western edited version of the series, THEM Anime Reviews panned the edited version of Syaoran as he comes across as "a bully and unkind idiot unlike the kind and caring one from the original." Adam Arnold of Animefringe, praised Rhys Huber's work as Syaoran, stating he was one of the few "only voices that really shine above the rest."

For the second film, Animefringe regarded the "melotic drama" relationship between Syaoran and Sakura as the main focus of the narrative as the fantasy elements from the main work were less prominent. Mania Entertainment enjoyed how Syaoran and Sakura's relationship is developed in the film as their friends support them to confess their feelings.

In regards to his role in Clear Card, THEM Anime Reviews described him as "blunt but deep down very nice" and laments how the series downplays the development of his relationship with Sakura despite both having become closer. The Fandom Post enjoyed how comical became relationship between the Syaoran and Sakura as, despite now being an official couple and going on dates, still get disapproval by Sakura's brother in the same mannerism as in the first series where Toya kept staring down at Syaoran. Anime News Network also commented on their date as it gives the two characters a sense of maturity despite Syaoran hiding information from his girlfriend, something that the series does not properly explore. A review for Anime UK News of Clear Card praised the depiction of Syaoran as being detached from Sakura's main group of friends, but criticized Jason Liebrecht's performance in the English dub, saying that Syaoran "sounds like a right wimp and his tone of voice lacks the stoic confidence that his Japanese counterpart has." Motoko Kumai's performance as Syaoran in the Japanese version was praised due to how she fit the role, especially considering the length of time that passed between the two Cardcaptor Sakura series and how Syaoran had developed in the story.

Editor Kiichiro Sugawara commented that when Tsubasa: Reservoir Chronicle started, most of his colleagues kept mentioning the series was interesting for having an alternate version of Sakura Kinomoto as he found that the original Syaoran was not popular within Cardcaptor Sakura. Because Syaoran Li was written as "charming" often seen in series aimed towards a female demography, shōjo manga, the older Syaoran from Tsubasa was changed to be been as a more heroic protagonist in order to appeal to the male demography, the ones who read shōnen manga instead. In a review of Tsubasa, another character bearing the same name and appearance as Syaoran appears wielding a jian identical to Syaoran. As a result, The Fandom Post found the character's fight scenes as a form of fanservice aimed towards fans of the first Syaoran.
