= Tsubasa Reservoir Chronicle the Movie: The Princess in the Birdcage Kingdom =

2005 short film by Itsuro Kawasaki

The Princess in the Birdcage Kingdom
- Japanese DVD cover
- Kanji: 劇場版 ツバサ・クロニクル 鳥カゴの国の姫君
- Revised Hepburn: Gekijōban Tsubasa Kuronikuru: Torikago no Kuni no Himegimi
- Directed by: Itsuro Kawasaki
- Screenplay by: Junichi Fujisaku; Midori Goto
- Based on: Tsubasa: Reservoir Chronicle by CLAMP
- Produced by: Hiroaki Morita; Hisako Matsumoto; Ikuko Kumano; Natsumi Shirahama; Noriaki Aishita; Tetsuya Nakatake; Tetsuya Watanabe; Yoshihiro Iwasaki
- Starring: Miyu Irino; Yui Makino; Tetsu Inada; Daisuke Namikawa; Mika Kikuchi
- Cinematography: Miki Sakuma
- Edited by: Taeko Hamauzu
- Music by: Yuki Kajiura
- Production company: Production I.G
- Distributed by: Shochiku
- Release date: August 20, 2005
- Running time: 35 minutes
- Country: Japan
- Language: Japanese

Tsubasa Reservoir Chronicle the Movie: The Princess in the Birdcage Kingdom (Japanese: 劇場版 ツバサ・クロニクル 鳥カゴの国の姫君, Hepburn: Gekijōban Tsubasa Kuronikuru: Torikago no Kuni no Himegimi) is a 2005 Japanese animated action fantasy short film based on the Tsubasa: Reservoir Chronicle manga written and illustrated by manga artist group CLAMP. The short film was directed by Itsuro Kawasaki, co-written by Junichi Fujisaku and Midori Goto, and was produced by Production I.G. The film premiered in Japanese theaters on August 20, 2005, in conjunction with xxxHolic: A Midsummer Night's Dream, another Production I.G animated film and based on CLAMP manga. Set between the two seasons of the anime series Tsubasa by Bee Train, the film continues Syaoran's group's journey to find Sakura's "feathers" (memories) in different worlds. On the journey they arrive at the Country of Birdcages, which contains one of Sakura's feathers.

The Tsubasa and xxxHolic films were conceived by Kodansha, the Japanese publisher of both manga. After convincing Production I.G to develop them, Kodansha director hired Junichi Fujisaku to write the Tsubasa film. Like the TV series, Yuki Kajiura was the score's composer and the producer was Tetsuya Nakatake. In North America The Princess in the Birdcage Kingdom was licensed by Funimation Entertainment, who released it with A Midsummer Night's Dream and episodes of the Tsubasa anime.

The film received a mixed response from manga and anime publications and other media; although its animation and pacing were praised, its length was criticized as only ten minutes longer than the TV episodes.

== Plot ==
In their continuing journey to find the feathers which are the fragments of Princess Sakura's lost memory, Syaoran, Kurogane, Fai D. Flowright, Mokona Modoki and Sakura move through time and space. They visit the Country of Birdcages, an apparently-peaceful country where people and birds live together; each person has a companion bird. When they arrive Syaoran, Princess Sakura and Mokona are separated from Kurogane and Fai, who are confronted by the King's warriors and captured. Syaoran, Sakura and Mokona meet Koruri, who introduces them to her princess (an alternate version of Princess Tomoyo). Tomoyo tells Syaoran's group that the king (her uncle) oppresses the country's citizens, seizing their birds and planning to seal the country with a key. They are attacked by the king's bird-like soldier, who easily defeats Syaoran and Tomoyo's commander and kidnaps Princess Tomoyo and Mokona.

Syaoran, Princess Sakura, Koruri and the commander infiltrate the king's castle to rescue Tomoyo. The king unleashes Dodo, an enormous bird. Fai, Kurogane and Mokona escape from their cages, and are confronted by Dodo's offspring. They rejoin Syaoran's group, and climb to the castle's upper floors to stop the king. Princess Sakura gives Syaoran a ring which she had received from Princess Tomoyo; Syaoran confronts Dodo, realizing that the ring is composed of all the citizens' birds. Princess Tomoyo's bird Lei-Fan helps Syaoran fight Dodo, who is carrying the king. Tomoyo tells Syaoran to use the ring to fight the king and Syaoran, surrounded by fire, launches himself to destroy Dodo. He knocks out the king, whose body transforms into a bird and leaves one of Princess Sakura's feathers behind. Because of the ring the country remains trapped in darkness, and Syaoran's group asks Dimensional Witch Yuko Ichihara for help. Princess Tomoyo gives Yūko her bell, sacrificing the relationship between the citizens and the birds in exchange for a key which frees the country from its darkness.

== Casts ==
Character	Japanese	English
Syaoran	Miyu Irino	Jason Liebrecht
Princess Sakura	Yui Makino	Monica Rial
Kurogane	Tetsu Inada	Christopher Sabat
Fai D. Flowright	Daisuke Namikawa	Vic Mignogna
Mokona Modoki	Mika Kikuchi	Carrie Savage
Princess Tomoyo	Maaya Sakamoto	Amber Cotton
King of Birdland	Jouji Nakata	Barry Yandell
Koruri	Makoto Tsumura	Kate Oxley
Yūko Ichihara	Sayaka Ohara	Colleen Clinkenbeard

== Production ==
Kodansha (publisher of the Tsubasa and xxxHolic manga) conceived the idea of developing both films and contacted Production I.G, who chose Toru Kawaguchi and Tetsuya Nakatake as producers. Since Tsubasa was popular in Japan and Production I.G was well-known, Natakate wanted viewers to enjoy the film. Directed by Itsuro Kawasaki and written by Midori Goto and Junichi Fujisaku, its characters were designed by Yoko Kikuchi and its music composed by Yuki Kajiura. Director Itsuro Kawasaki met producer Nakatake, who told him that they were working in The Princess of the Birdcage Kingdom but had not chosen a director. According to Kawasaki, he had declined an offer from Production I.G because he was working on an anime television series. It was the director's first feature animated film; Kawasaki was initially sceptical about making a film based on Tsubasa: Reservoir Chronicle, because he thought the market was saturated and wanted to focus on less-popular series. Since he had heard that Tsubasa: Reservoir Chronicle was an entertaining manga, Kawasaki read it when the film finished development. He was satisfied because it was what he had in mind when he made the film, and praised CLAMP's illustrations and designs. When Yoko Kikuchi was chosen as character designer, Kawasaki said, "we were very lucky"; he was familiar with Kikuchi's work, and she was fond of the character Sakura.

Since The Princess in the Birdcage Kingdom is aimed at a younger audience than xxxHolic, producer Tetsuya Natakate wanted to emphasize action scenes to make it enjoyable and hired young animators to give "a brand-new look to [the] anime [of Tsubasa: Reservoir Chronicle]". Yasunori Miyazawa was in charge of the storyboards. After a discussion with director Kawasaki, it was decided that the film's setting would resemble Okinawa. Yuki Kajiura was asked to compose a score different from that of the TV series to convey the characters' state of mind, and Natakate was pleased with the result. CLAMP member and leader Ageha Ohkawa liked the way the films were connected, despite their different themes.

The film has two pieces of theme music. "Aerial", its opening theme, is performed by Kinya Kotani and "Amrita" (its closing theme) is performed by Yui Makino. Before the film's premiere, an event was held at Shibuya Tower Records in which Kotani performed "Amrita" and the Japanese cast discussed the film. Both songs were released as singles in Japan on August 17, 2005. When he composed "Aerial", Kotani focused on the word "aerial" and lyrically compared the Tsubasa Chronicle universe with everything he had written so far. The film began development as a 30-minute-long title, making Kawasaki focus on animation quality to make it stand out from the TV episodes. Background content expanding the film's world was cut for length.

== Release ==
The film was released in Japan on August 20, 2005. Shochiku released the film's DVD version on February 25, 2006, in Japan, in regular and premium editions. Funimation Entertainment announced their licensing of the film, with Tsubasa's first anime season and xxxHolic, in the February 2006 issue of Anime Insider. The film was released as an English-language DVD on February 19, 2009, in North America as a double feature with xxxHolic. On May 4, 2010, Funimation re-released the double feature in Blu-ray format, including the extras in the original DVD release. In Australia, the double-feature DVD was released on July 23, 2008, by Madman Entertainment. The film was released with a DVD box set, Tsubasa Reservoir Chronicle: Collected Memories Box Set (the anime's first season), on January 19, 2010, and was re-released in Blu-ray format on May 4 with the anime's second season.

== Reception ==
The Princess in the Birdcage Kingdom received mixed reviews from critics. Reviewing the film with xxxHolic, IGN's N. S. Davidson found it appealing to Tsubasa series viewers despite its short length. Davidson enjoyed the interaction between the films' storylines, allowing elements of Tsubasa to be explained in xxxHolic, and noted artistic similarities between them. Active Anime writer Holly Ellingwood praised the film's "suspenseful" story, comparing its setting and animation to the films of Hayao Miyazaki. odd Douglass Jr. of DVD Talk agreed, saying that series fans would enjoy its story and pacing and overlook its length. According to Douglass, although Tsubasa and xxxHolic were similar in style and length the latter had "a more cohesive story". He strongly recommended Funimation's double release as improving the appeal of both series. Blu-ray's Dustin Somner compared the film to the anime series, calling it "a bit stronger than the majority of the television episodes" due to its quick pace. Although he enjoyed the pacing, Somner wrote that important parts of the story would be missed in a first viewing and found its plot unexpectedly complex during his third viewing.

The Princess in the Birdcage Kingdom was criticized for its length, that of an extended TV episode. Anime News Network's Santos wondered why material was cut from the film, writing that a longer film would have been more exciting. Also criticizing the film's length, Chris Beveridge of Mania Entertainment wrote that its extras compensated and found The Princess in the Birdcage Kingdom's animation appealing as a contrast with that of xxxHolic. Carlo Santos of Anime News Network criticized the film's length but called it "good art", praising its animation. Casey Brienza, also from Anime News Network, called the films a service to Clamp fans (due to their improved animation) and their plots primarily filler.
