= Syaoran (Tsubasa: Reservoir Chronicle, clone) =

Fictional character from Tsubasa: Reservoir Chronicle

- Tsubasa: Reservoir Chronicle xxxHolic character
- Syaoran as seen in Tsubasa: Reservoir Chronicle wielding Hien
- First appearance: Tsubasa: Reservoir Chronicle chapter 1: "The World of Beginnings" (2003)
- Created by: Clamp
- Voiced by: Miyu Irino (Japanese); Jason Liebrecht (English)

In-universe information
- Weapon: Dao/katana
- Relatives: Fujitaka (adoptive father); Sakura (wife); Tsubasa (original self/son); Kimihiro Watanuki (son); Clow Reed (ancestor)

Syaoran (Japanese: 小狼, Hepburn: Shaoran) is a fictional character and protagonist in Tsubasa: Reservoir Chronicle, a manga series written and illustrated by Clamp. Syaoran is introduced as a young archaeologist who is in love with Sakura, his childhood friend and the princess from the Kingdom of Clow. When Sakura's memories are scattered throughout parallel dimensions, Syaoran goes on a quest to recover them, at the cost of Sakura never remembering him. Later in the series, Syaoran is revealed to be an artificial human created by the sorcerer Fei-Wang Reed—the sorcerer who wants to use him to collect Sakura's magical feathers. Controlled by Fei-Wang Reed's will, Syaoran becomes one of the series' antagonists in the second half of the series. Syaoran has featured in other works by Clamp, including the manga xxxHolic and the drama CD series Holistuba.

Syaoran's character is based on Syaoran Li, a character from Clamp's manga Cardcaptor Sakura and had several changes to appeal to the series' demographic rather that Cardcaptor Sakura as such series was aimed toward female readers. This included making this Syaoran more heroic and serious to fit the narrative and atmosphere. Clamp took multiple notes about the handling of this character from their editor in order to make him stand out. In Japanese, Syaoran is voiced by Miyu Irino in Japanese and Jason Liebrecht in English.

The character has been well received by readers of the series, placing high in popularity polls from Tsubasa and manga and anime series in general. He also received positive comments by manga and anime publications, mainly due to how heroic he is in order to save the person he loves: Sakura. Syaoran's role as an antagonist has also received positive comments; some writers use nicknames to differentiate his antagonistic self from his original self, often calling him evil.

== Creation and conception ==
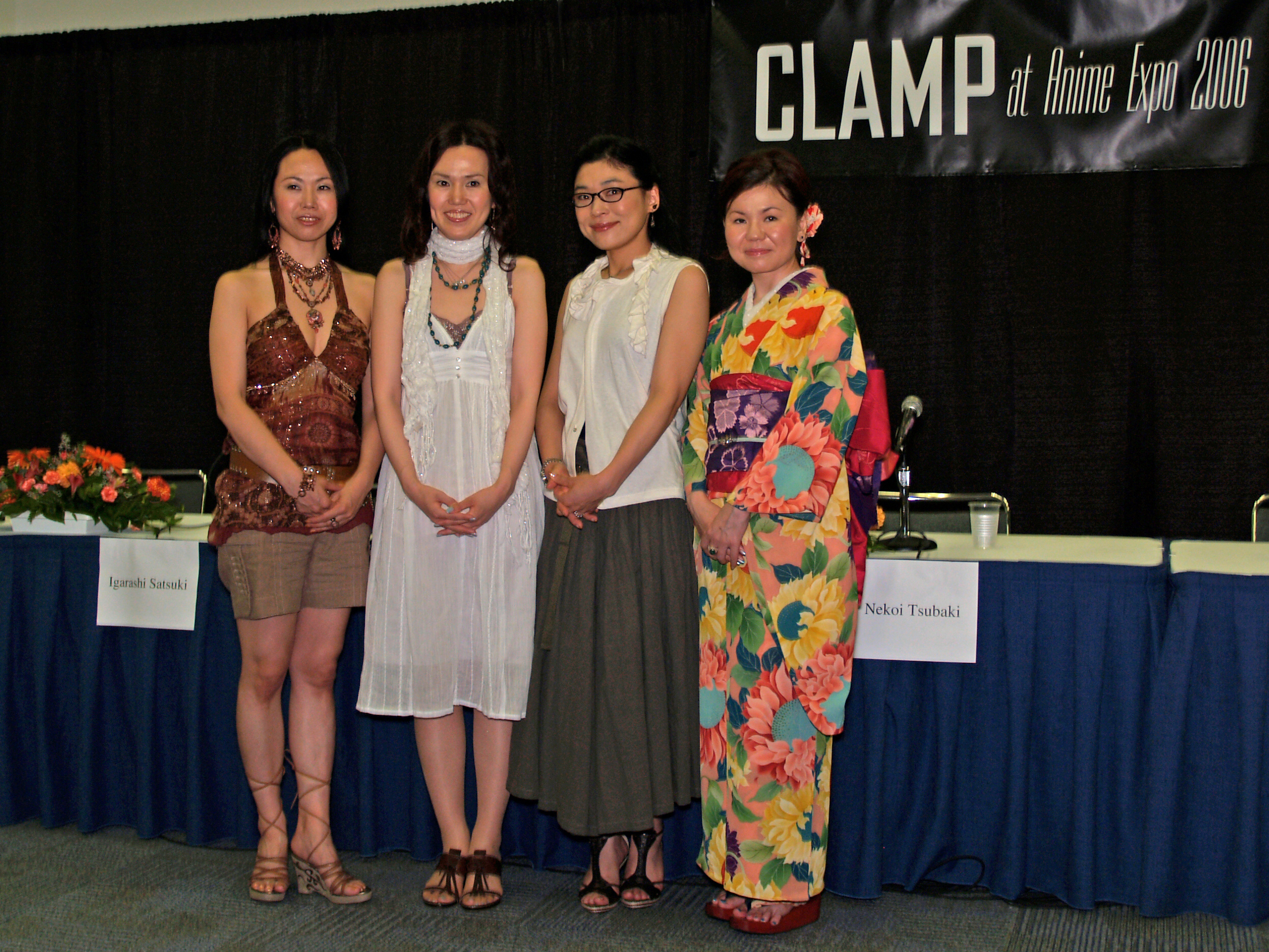
The four Clamp artists (from left to right): Satsuki Igarashi, Nanase Ohkawa, Mick Nekoi, and Mokona Apapa created Syaoran

Clamp designed Syaoran using the ideas of manga author Osamu Tezuka and his Star System. Syaoran was based on Syaoran Li, a character from Cardcaptor Sakura—another series written by Clamp. Syaoran and Sakura were chosen to be the series' protagonist because their Cardcaptor Sakura counterparts had a happy ending, but Clamp said that the characters would have to go throughout the series to get their own happy ending. Because Syaoran Li was written as "charming" often seen in series aimed towards a female demography, shōjo manga, the older Syaoran from Tsubasa was changed to be been as a more heroic protagonist in order to appeal to the male demography, the ones who read shōnen manga instead. Editor Kiichiro Sugawara commented that when Tsubasa started, most of his colleagues kept mentioning the series was interesting for having an alternate version of Sakura Kinomoto as he found that the original Syaoran Li was not popular within Cardcaptor Sakura. In order to further appeal to the demography and the company, Sugawara suggested Syaoran needs to be stronger based on how popularity polls from this genre works. Although Syaoran is popular with female readers for his kind personality, male readers would instead prefer him if he was a strong fighter. As a result, the manga's second story arc focused on more on fight scenes which Clamp reflected they could have drawn more if they went back.

At the start of the manga, Syaoran's character was already planned to go through development. The characters Fai D. Flowright and Kurogane were added to provide additional characters who were older than the lead. In early versions of the manga, Syaoran was portrayed as a mechanic rather than an archaeologist, with Fujitaka having taught him about machines. In the original design, Syaoran wore a cap, a different outfit and an enormous adjustable spanner. In building up his character, Syaoran was written to act as a detective when confronting Fei-Wang Reed spy Kyle Rondart in the Jade World story arc. Ohkawa studied detective storylines when writing this events of the manga.

Clamp said Syaoran became popular with male readers as a hero and relationship with Sakura, based on the demography. After events of the Oto country where Syaoran participated in several battles fighting for the king Ashura and was at disadvantage, Clamp's editor for Tsubasa, Kiichiro Sugawara, wrote that he wondered whether "anything good ever happen[s] to Syaoran"; Clamp said that their publishing company, Kodansha had received demands from readers for Syaoran to become stronger, and advised Clamp to let him have occasional good experiences. Sugawara stated that he wanted Syaoran to become a stronger fighter and further expand his bond with Kurogane in order to appeal more to the shonen manga demography. In order to make his fight scenes more entertaining, Clamp thought about giving Syaoran named sword techniques like those of Kurogane but in the end this was not added to the series. Clamp originally planned Subaru to be Syaoran's teacher. However, the group later decided to replace Subaru with Seishiro. In the second half of the manga, it was revealed Syaoran was a clone from another character who became the protagonist.

Clamp aimed to make both of them equally different based on their actions despite being virtually identical. The usage of two characters with the same appearance was noted by Clamp to be a common elements in their stories, but Clamp also aimed to create another link between Syaoran, Sakura and Kimihiro Watanuki, the protagonist of xxxHolic. Nanase Ohkawa referred to both clones appearing in the series with the term "utsushimi" (写身) to make them look like a departure from the original English word that fans often mention, aiming for different take of the cloning.

=== Casting ===
In the animated adaptations of Tsubasa: Reservoir Chronicle, Syaoran is voiced by Miyu Irino in Japanese, and by Jason Liebrecht in English. Irino said that ever since the introduction of the original Syaoran—who he also voiced—he sometimes had problems voicing both characters. Fellow voice actress Yui Makino also discussed Irino's role, saying that he was the most difficult character to cast because of the requirement to portray the two Syaorans. Irino said that he grew attached to the role since he played the role of Syaoran for several years starting doing the television series when he was in high school and that he was in college by the original video animations. Still, he was interested by the fact that the two characters he was voicing, Syaorans, were also fighting each other.

=== Characterization and themes ===
Found alone as a child by a man named Fujitaka, Syaoran often has visions of himself in a mirror. Syaoran is initially portrayed as a shy and innocent teenager unable to tell Sakura his romantic feelings. Syaoran's desire to save her in the first story arc through a magical spirit known as Kudan which develops a strong power as a result of Syaoran's kindess aimed towards the princess. This power helps to develop the friendship Syaoran has with the young teenager Masayoshi who originally had inferiority issues. Syaoran befriends Masayoshi although they will never see each other again with Clamp noting that the teenager aids Masayoshi in helping to understand what is strength without behaving cocky about it as he instead feels strength is just the determination he possesses. The second story arc helps to cement these ideals when Syaoran battles a sorcerer from Yangban.

Sakura losing her memories of Syaoran and struggling to once again develop feelings for him is one of the main themes of Tsubasa: Reservoir Chronicle, showing the value of relationships throughout the series. When Sakura awakens from her catatonic state thanks to Syaoran state, Syaoran greets him but is shocked by the fact he is not remembered by her despite having already known what would happen. When Syaoran and Sakura already met in the series' beginning, Sakura addressed young man by his name without a Japanese suffix and wanted Syaoran to stop calling her princess. However, Syaoran realizes the present Sakura has no such affection towards him in the second story arc when talking. However, when Sakura starts remembering her past thanks to the next feather, Syaoran becomes happier as he realizes that regardless of what happens to his memories, Sakura will always be the person he loves as he remembers that his own memories of his first meeting with Sakura comforted him for the first time before meeting his adoptive father, Fujitaka.

Across his journey, Syaoran desires power to able to accomplish his missions. Similar to how the hunter Seishiro trained him once, he asks his partner Kurogane to teach him swordsmanship. This causes the two develop a brotherhood-like relationship in the process. However, unlike Kurogane or Ryuho, Syaoran does not dream of becoming stronger but instead discover new lands. Despite still training alongside, Syaoran is also comforted by Fay D. Flowright, forming a similar to the one he has with Kurogane.

== Appearances ==
=== In Tsubasa: Reservoir Chronicle ===
Syaoran is introduced in Tsubasa: Reservoir Chronicle as a young archaeologist who often visits the Kingdom of Clow and is in love with his childhood friend Sakura, the kingdom's princess. Syaoran is the adopted son of the late archeologist Fujitaka, who found him as a child in the street with no memories of his past. Syaoran often accompanied his father on expeditions, and following his father's death, he lived alone while continuing his father's job. After Sakura's memories are scattered in the form of feathers throughout many dimensions, Syaoran meets Yūko Ichihara, a witch who gives him, Fai D. Flowright, and Kurogane—her other clients—Mokona Modoki; a creature that can transport them to different dimensions. Syaoran pays Yūko for the use of Mokona with all of Sakura's memories that involved him.

Throughout the journey, Syaoran starts bonding with Sakura again, and becomes friends with Fai, Kurogane, and Mokona. Syaoran specializes in hand-to-hand combat, mainly focusing on kicks taught by hunter Seishirō during his childhood when he had no visual perception of depth because he was blind in his right eye. He later trains blindfolded with Kurogane to overcome this weakness. Kurogane also teaches him swordsmanship to make him a stronger fighter, and he gains Hien (緋炎; lit. "Scarlet Flame")—a sword with magical properties that allow it to create fire.

Syaoran is a clone of another teenager; the sorcerer Fei-Wang Reed created the clone to find Sakura's feathers. The original Syaoran placed some of his "heart" within the clone's right eye, allowing the clone to develop his own personality. After the seal breaks, Syaoran loses all his emotions and Fei-Wang uses him to collect feathers in other dimensions on his own, betraying his friends. Syaoran becomes immune to pain, which makes him ruthless and strong. Before leaving his former friends, he devours Fai's left eye to gain his own magic powers, which grow stronger every time he uses them. When fighting his original self, Syaoran destroys Sakura's soul—which is revealed as another clone who asks Syaoran to recover his heart just before disappearing. Despite being shocked by this, Syaoran is again emotionless when the original Syaoran, Kurogane and Fai go to fight Fei-Wang. In the course of the battle, Syaoran betrays Fei-Wang to help his original self kill him. When Fei-Wang tries to kill the original Syaoran, the clone intervenes and is impaled by Fei-Wang's sword. As his body is about to be destroyed, Syaoran apologizes to his friends—including the original Syaoran—leaving only the eye he took from Fai and Hien to his original self.

Yuko later makes the clone reborn as normal humans, using her and Clow's magic left behind as their payment as they are the ones responsible for Fei-Wang's actions. As both grow up as normal humans, they meet and live together. He and Sakura have a son, who is the original Syaoran, creating a time paradox. Because they realize that all the previous events would be repeated and their son would not be able to save the original Sakura, they seal themselves inside a glass tube hidden in Yuūko's shop. Being reborn as a descendant of the sorcerer Clow Reed, Syaoran and Sakura break free from the tube and use their new powers to help their friends defeat Fei-Wang. As their creator dies, Syaoran and Sakura vanish, leaving two feathers that merge within their original selves' bodies.

=== In other media ===
Syaoran appears in other adaptations of Tsubasa, including the animated film Tsubasa Reservoir Chronicle the Movie: The Princess in the Birdcage Kingdom, in which he still travels with Sakura, Fai, Kurogane and Mokona across dimensions. He is included a playable character in two Nintendo DS video games from Tsubasa. In the drama CD series The Matinée of the Palace, Syaoran's group perform a play that re-enacts the series' story while searching for one of Sakura's feathers. Outside Tsubasa, Syaoran appears in Clamp's manga xxxHolic, which shows events in Tsubasa: Reservoir Chronicle. He does not appear in the animated adaptions of xxxHolic until the original video animation (OVA) series xxxHolic Shunmuki, in which he appears in the Dream World to confront the original Syaoran. In the spin-off drama CD series Holitsuba Gakuen, Syaoran is featured as a new student in a school named "Holitsuba", which includes characters from Tsubasa and xxxHolic. While he shares traits with his Tsubasa persona, such as his relationship with Sakura, he is portrayed as the identical twin of the original Syaoran.

In the Tsubasa sequel manga, Tsubasa: World Chronicle: Nirai Kanai, Syaoran appears in a dream from his original self, who seeks an opportunity to meet him once again. Upon their second meeting, the clone communicates with the original and tells him to reunite a sacred area from the world of Nirai Kanai, Utaki. In Utaki, the original Syaoran seeks to fight the clone in order to make him reincarnate alongside the undead from the world. However, since the Syaoran clone has been summoned as the original's opponent, it is impossible for him to obtain a new life. The clone then forces the original Syaoran to fight him and return the people from Nirai Kanai. The fight ends with the original using all his magic to beat up the clone, saving the undead.

== Reception ==
=== Popularity ===
Syaoran was well received by Japanese readers of Tsubasa: Reservoir Chronicle. In two popularity polls held by Weekly Shōnen Magazine, Syaoran was the most-liked character. He was also highly rated in other polls, which included best groups and best scenes from the series. In March 2010, Syaoran was ranked twenty-third best male anime character of the 2000s by the Japanese magazine Newtype. In the Animage's Anime Grand Prix poll from 2006, he was voted as the twelfth most popular male anime character. In the same year, he remained the fourteenth most popular male character. In the Animedia "2006 Animedia Character Awards", Syaoran was nominated in categories including "Strongest Character Award", "Best Newcomer Award", "Most Heroic Character Award" and "MVP (Most Valuable Player) Award"; his highest rating was in the "Best Newcomer Award", where he was ranked third. Various types of merchandising have been made based on Syaoran's appearance including plushies, keychains and patches. In the 2007 Seiyu Awards, Miyu Irino was a nominee in the category "Best New Actor" for his portrayal as Syaoran, but lost to Tetsuya Kakihara and Masakazu Morita.

=== Critical response ===
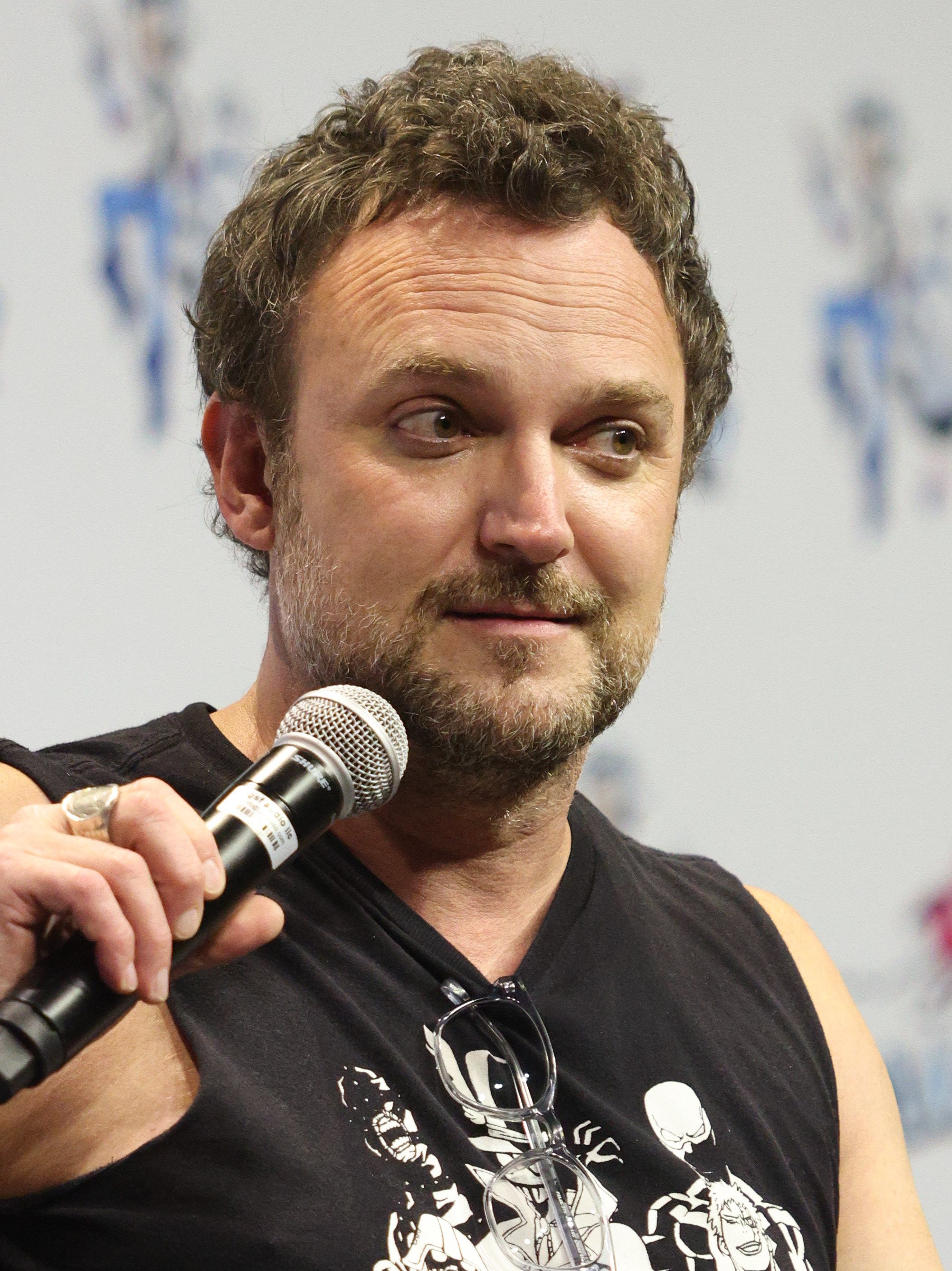
Jason Liebrecht's performance as Syaoran earned positive reactions.

Publications for manga, anime and other media have commented on Syaoran's character and role in the series. He received mainly positive responses. Ed Sizemore from Comics Worth Reading called him as "the perfect young hero" because of his seriousness, with points given for his care for Sakura. Although Carl Kimlinger found differences between Syaoran and his Cardcaptor Sakura counterpart, he found the traits of the former appealing. Michael Aronson from Manga Life found that while the characters behaves differently from Syaoran Li and act considerably older, it helps readers who have not read previous Clamp series understand the series. While DVDTalk found Syaoran's story similar to that of Sora from the Kingdom Hearts video games developed by Square Enix, they felt that the narrative provided in both OVAs offered a darker tone as well as multiple plot twists that might heavily surprise the audience through the subject of cloning. Although the series is a shōnen manga, Clamp incorporates shōjo manga motfifs into the character to attract a female demographic, with his desire to recover the magic feathers of Sakura being a common element of shōjo manga.

Japanese singer Maaya Sakamoto said that in the animated adaptation of Tsubasa: Reservoir Chronicle, Syaoran's straightforward feelings and strength to protect Sakura were very touching. Therefore, in the song "Kazemachi Jet"—the closing theme of the second season of the anime—she tried to capture the image of Syaoran growing from his naïve self into a young man through the meetings and partings over his journey and Syaoran's continuing protection of his loved one in spite of adversity. Singer Kinya Kotani also described sadness in Syaoran's strength, and said he had both forwarding-facing and backward-facing characteristics.

The plot twist in which Syaoran is revealed to be a clone and his fight against his original self has been regarded as "a titanic clash" by Chris Zimmerman from Comic Book Bin. Following this, Syaoran was called "evil Syaoran" and "Syaoran's evil clone". When writing "Saigo no Kajitsu", Sakamoto described Syaoran's fate as sad because he becomes the antagonist of his friends and is a clone. The twist has been a "potential real upset" because Syaoran is revealed to have been created by the series' main antagonist, Fei-Wang Reed. The relationship between both Syaorans has also been found confusing for some readers to understand; others said that while there was confusion in this scene, the events led to a well-executed ending. They also highlighted the bond both have through their eyes. Sakura Eries from Mania Entertainment said Syaoran's actions after the twist were disturbing because of his violent acts. Syaoran has been labeled as "an agent of destruction" because he ignores seemingly mortal wounds and encounters various opponents in a single manga volume. Eries said that she felt cheated after the revelations of Syaoran's and Sakura's true natures because it changed the readers' views of them. Manga News praised the ending for the heavy focus on the clones of Syaoran and Sakura, giving emotional scenes, as well as their relationship Yuko and Fei-Wang Reed, but lamented Fai and Kurogane for having less prominent roles. Comic Book Resources compared the relationship of Syaoran and Sakura to that of the Cardcaptor Sakura character Syaoran Li and Sakura Kinomoto but on a more bittersweet note as they are both revealed as clones who disintegrate in the bodies of their original selves.

Mania Entertainment's Megan Lavey said Syaoran's and Sakura's initial relationship is a "pretty simple love story", and liked their personalities. IGN's Jeff Harris said Syaoran's role is interesting because he sacrifices his relationship with Sakura and his own life to recover her memories. Active Anime's Christopher Seaman said the romantic relationship between them is one of the most mature parts of the series, and it helped balance the other fantastic themes, which added more variety for the series' audience. Kimlinger said their relationship made up for some problems in the anime adaptation. Kimlinger also said Jason Liebrecht's role as Syaoran's English voice is better than Miyu Irino's work. However, Kimlinger praised both performances because of the way Syaoran's emotions are played. Nevertheless, Irino's work was also well received by Japanese fans.

Sarahi Isuki Castella Olivera from Benemérita Universidad Autónoma de Puebla said that while the two Syaoran are nearly identical characters, they possess different hearts with the clone losing it in the series' second half as a result of being controlled by Fei Wang Reed. The differences between the two Syaoran's paths lead into both of them becoming their own separate beings. The same happens with the two Sakuras. The original Syaoran is said to fall into humiliation when he forced to ask Fei Wang's help to protect the original Sakura. The concept of cloning is compared to buddhism zen as it coincides with the individualism of a person; Both Syaorans are often drawn together but their stances, weaponry and clothing is often made different and are found fighting against each other comparable to the yin and yang.
