= Jason Liebrecht =

American voice actor

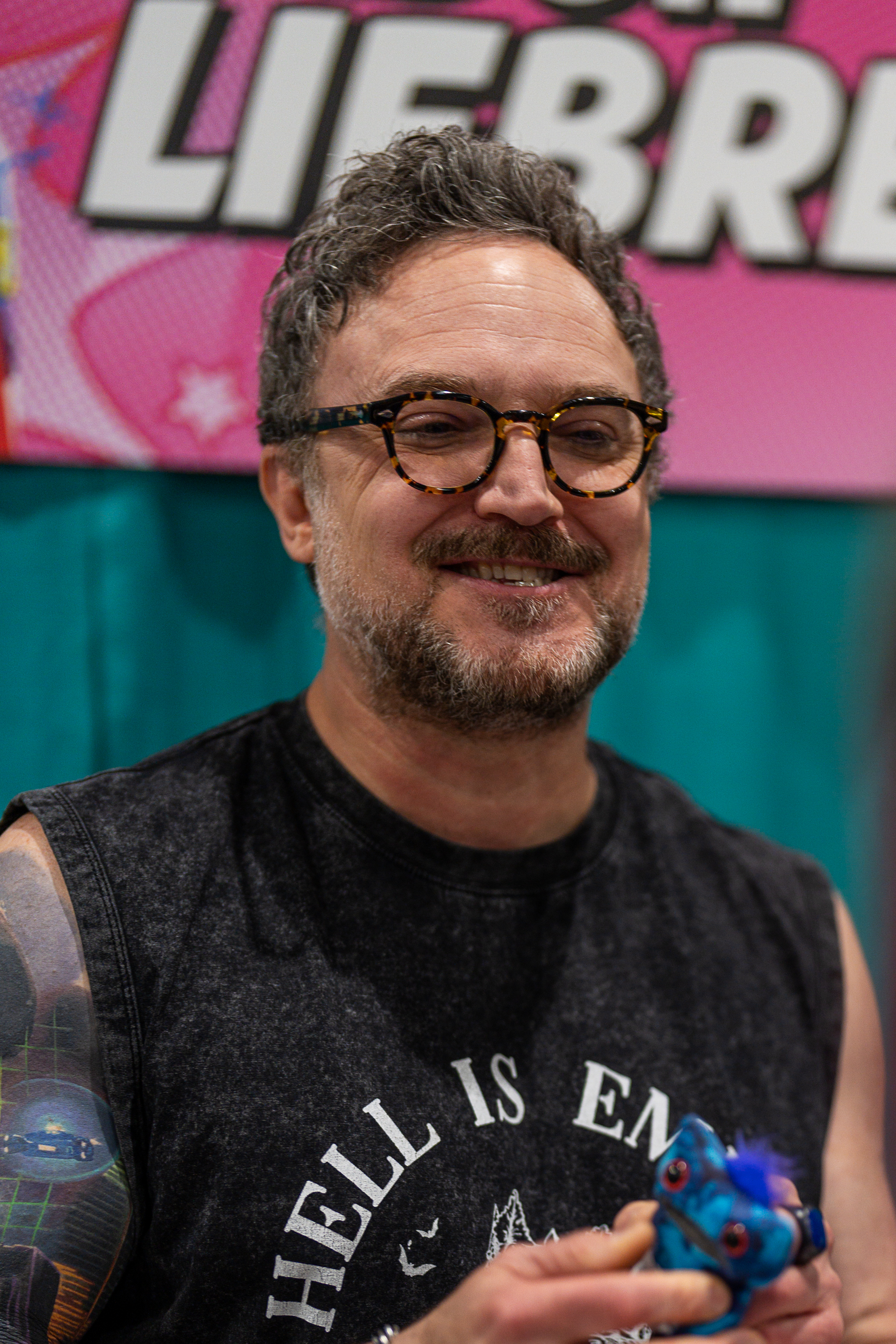
- Liebrecht at Animate! Raleigh in 2026
- Born: Ernesto Jason Liebrecht
- Occupation: Voice actor
- Years active: 2004–present

Ernesto Jason Liebrecht is an American voice actor who voices for a number of English versions of Japanese anime series and video games. Some of his major roles include Lavi and the Millennium Earl in the D.Gray-man series, Tapion in Dragon Ball Z: Wrath of the Dragon, Syaoran in Tsubasa: Reservoir Chronicle and Cardcaptor Sakura: Clear Card, Rob Lucci in the Funimation dub of One Piece, Akira Takizawa in Eden of the East, Train Heartnet in Black Cat, Hei in Darker than Black, Larcade Dragneel in the final season of Fairy Tail, Dabi in My Hero Academia, Vulcan Joseph in Fire Force, Hiroto Suwa in Orange, Yato in Noragami, Mars in Black Clover, Zeke Yeager in Attack on Titan and Finnian in Black Butler.

== Biography ==
Liebrecht had a leading role in the indie film Home about which the Philadelphia City Paper said "The performances are uniformly strong, especially from winsome leads Liebrecht and Nicol Zanzarella," and for which he was nominated for best actor at the Trenton Film Festival. He also had a minor role (as Hey Now Kid) in David Byrne's film True Stories. He made a cameo as one of the "gang of four" in the indie film, Waking Life and is scheduled to play Jerry in the New York City premiere of Karla, a play by Steve Earle. He is a member of the Rude Mechs and was nominated for The Austin Critics' Table Awards "Outstanding Supporting Actor in a Comedy" for his performance in their production of Lipstick Traces.

== Filmography ==
=== Anime ===
List of voice performances in anime
Year	Title	Role	Notes	Source
2004	GetBackers	Ban Midou	ep 6-49	
2006	Black Cat	Train Heartnet		
2007	Tsubasa: Reservoir Chronicle	Syaoran	2 seasons	
2008	Baldr Force	Toru Soma		
2008	Ghost Hunt	John Brown		
2008	Darker than Black	Hei	2 seasons and OVAs	
2009	D.Gray-man	Lavi, Millennium Earl		
2009	Baccano!	Luck Gandor		
2009	Big Windup!	Kyohei Akimaru		
2009	Fullmetal Alchemist: Brotherhood	Karley		
2010	Dragon Ball Z Kai	Jeice		
2010	Eden of the East	Akira Takizawa		
2011	Black Butler	Finnian	2 seasons	
2011	Ga-Rei: Zero	Noriyuki Izuna		
2012	Hetalia: World Series	Iceland		
2012	A Certain Magical Index	Aureolus Izzard		
2012	One Piece	Rob Lucci, Hattori		
2013	Tenchi Muyo! War on Geminar	Kenshi Masaki		
2013	We Without Wings	Kakeru Otori		
2013	Aquarion Evol	Cayenne Suzushiro		
2014	Karneval	Kiharu		
2014	Red Data Girl	Hodaka Murakami		
2015	Nobunagun	Jack		
2015	Noragami	Yato	2 seasons	
2016	Prince of Stride: Alternative	Heath Hasekura		
2016	91 Days	Serpente		
2016	Orange	Hiroto Suwa		
2016	Show By Rock!! #	Titan		
2016–present	Touken Ranbu: Hanamaru series	Yoshiyuki Mutsunokami		
2016	Aquarion Logos	Subete Kenzaki		
2017	Dragon Ball Super	Champa		Tweet
2017	Fuuka	Nico		
2017	Samurai Warriors	Yukimura Sanada		
2017	The Silver Guardian	Ransho		
2017–2023	Attack on Titan series	Zeke Yeager / Beast Titan	As Ernesto Jason Liebrecht	
2017–2025	My Hero Academia series	Dabi		
2017–2021	Black Clover	Mars		
2018	Cardcaptor Sakura: Clear Card	Syaoran Li		
2018	The Morose Mononokean	Haruitsuki Abeno	2 seasons	
2018	Pop Team Epic	Pipimi	Ep. 6b	
2018	Free! Dive to the Future	Hiyori Tono		
2019	Astra Lost in Space	Charce Lacroix		Tweet
2019	Fairy Tail	Larcade Dragneel		
2019–2026	Fire Force	Vulcan		
2020	Plunderer	Schmerman Bach		
2020	Fruits Basket: 2nd season	Kunimitsu Tomoda		
2020	After the Rain	Ryosuke Kase		
2020	Our Last Crusade or the Rise of a New World	Iska		
2021	Shadows House	Ryan		
2021	Full Dive	Tesla	As Ernesto Jason Liebrecht	
2021	SSSS.Dynazenon	Koyomi Yamanaka		
2021	How a Realist Hero Rebuilt the Kingdom	Castor Vargas	As Ernesto Jason Liebrecht	
2021	Magatsu Wahrheit Zuerst	Zaitz		
2021	Ikebukuro West Gate Park	Shigeyuki Utsumi	As Ernesto Jason Liebrecht	
2022	Requiem of the Rose King	Edward	As Ernesto Jason Liebrecht	
2022	Takt Op. Destiny	Takt	As Ernesto Jason Liebrecht	
2022	The Girl from the Other Side: Siúil, a Rún	Soldier		
2023	Sugar Apple Fairy Tale	Hugh Mercury	As Ernesto Jason Liebrecht	

=== Animation ===
List of voice performances in animation
Year	Title	Role	Notes	Source
2019–present	RWBY	Qrow Branwen, The Hound	Volume 7–present, succeeded Vic Mignogna as Qrow	
2021	RWBY Chibi	Qrow Branwen	Season 4	
2025	To Be Hero X	Ghostblade		

=== Films ===
List of voice performances in films
Year	Title	Role	Notes	Source
2006	Fullmetal Alchemist the Movie: Conqueror of Shamballa	Alfons Heiderich		
2006	Dragon Ball Z: Wrath of the Dragon	Tapion		
2009	Tsubasa Reservoir Chronicle the Movie: The Princess in the Birdcage Kingdom	Syaoran		
2010	Summer Wars	Ryohei Jinnouchi		
2011	Eden of the East: The King of Eden	Akira Takizawa		
2011	Eden of the East: Paradise Lost	Akira Takizawa		
2013	Wolf Children	Sohei		
2016	The Empire of Corpses	John H. Watson		
2016	Psycho Pass: The Movie	Nicholas Wong		
2017	Black Butler: Book of the Atlantic	Finnian		
2019	One Piece: Stampede	Rob Lucci		

=== Live-action ===
List of live-action performances
Year	Title	Role	Notes	Source
2006	Home	Bobby		
2016	Day 5	Colin	Web series	
2019	The Chosen	Driver	TV series, ep. "I have called you by name"	

=== Video games ===
List of voice performances in video games
Year	Title	Role	Notes	Refs
2006	Dragon Ball Z: Budokai Tenkaichi 2	Tapion		
2007	Dragon Ball Z: Budokai Tenkaichi 3	Tapion		
2008	The Last Remnant	Lord David Nassau	As E. Jason Liebrecht	
2008	Wizard101	Prospector Zeke, Diego the Duelmaster		
2009	Street Fighter IV	Abel		
2009	Ghostbusters: The Video Game	Additional Voices		
2010	Super Street Fighter IV	Abel		
2010	Dragon Ball Z: Tenkaichi Tag Team	Jeice		
2010	Dragon Ball: Raging Blast 2	Jeice		
2011	DC Universe Online	Bane, Eclipso, Hawkman		
2011	Dragon Ball Z: Ultimate Tenkaichi	Jeice		
2012	Street Fighter X Tekken	Abel		
2012	Pirate101	Prospector Zeke, Lasko		
2012	Borderlands 2	Mordecai		
2013	Aliens: Colonial Marines	Quintaro, Marines		
2013	Shadow Warrior	Lo Wang		
2014	Smite	Ah Muzen Cab		
2014	Borderlands: The Pre-Sequel	Mordecai		
2014	Tales from the Borderlands	Mordecai		
2016	Street Fighter V	Abel, Ring Announcer, Shadaloo Soldier (H)		
2016	Shadow Warrior 2	Lo Wang		
2017	Dragon Ball Xenoverse 2	Champa, Tapion	DLC	
2018	Paladins: Champions of the Realm	Qrow Branwen	DLC	
2019	Borderlands 3	Mordecai		
2019	Dragon Ball Legends	Tapion, Champa		
2020	My Hero One's Justice 2	Dabi		
2021	Tales of Luminaria	Edouard Rouquier		
2022	RWBY: Arrowfell	Qrow Branwen		
