= List of Tsubasa: Reservoir Chronicle chapters =

The first volume of Tsubasa: Reservoir Chronicle as released by Kodansha

The chapters of the manga series Tsubasa: Reservoir Chronicle were written and illustrated by Clamp, a creative team of four manga authors. The series premiered in Japan in Weekly Shōnen Magazine in May 2003, and after 233 chapters, ended in October 2009. The plot follows Sakura, the princess of Clow Kingdom, and Syaoran, a young archaeologist and her childhood friend, on a quest to recover Sakura's memories, which have been scattered throughout many worlds in the form of feathers. Dimensional Witch Yūko Ichihara sends them with two people who also have wishes that require travelling through worlds, Kurogane and Fai D. Flowright, and Mokona, a magical creature with the power to transport them through dimensions.

The chapters were collected in twenty-eight tankōbon volumes by Kodansha, with the first volume released on August 12, 2003 and volume 28 released on November 17, 2009. Each chapter is called "Chapitre" (シャピトル, Shapitoru), French for "Chapter". All the volumes were also released in deluxe edition at the same time of the originals' release, containing color pages and new illustrations. A new manga titled Tsubasa World Chronicle Nirai Kanai Hen started seriazation in Kodansha's Magazine Special in August 2014. The series follows the "original Syaoran", Fai, Kurogane and Mokona in a journey to a country where they learn they can start a ritual for reincarnations.

The first series has been adapted into a 52 episode anime series titled Tsubasa Chronicle animated by Bee Train and directed by Kōichi Mashimo. Other animated adaptions but produced by Production I.G include an anime film, The Princess in the Birdcage Kingdom, a three part original video animation (OVA) series, Tsubasa Tokyo Revelations, and another two part OVA series, Tsubasa Shunraiki.

Tsubasa: Reservoir Chronicle was one of the first four manga series licensed for English release in North America by Del Rey Manga, and was acquired together with Mobile Suit Gundam SEED, Negima! Magister Negi Magi, and xxxHolic in January 2004. Del Rey Manga released the first volume of the series on April 27, 2004, and the last one on November 23, 2010. Tanoshimi, the United Kingdom branch of Random House, published the first 14 volumes as published by Del Rey in the United Kingdom, between August 3, 2006 and June 5, 2008. The series is also licensed for an English-language release in Singapore by Chuang Yi, who released volume 27 on March 23, 2010.

== Volume list ==
=== Tsubasa: Reservoir Chronicle ===
No.	Title	Original release date	English release date
1	Sakura and Syaoran Return! Tsubasa o Sagasu Shōnen no Tabi ga Hajimaru!! (「翼」を探す少年の旅が始まる!!, lit. The journey of the boy who searches for "wings" begins!!)	August 10, 2003; 978-4-06-363277-4	April 27, 2004 (NA) — August 3, 2006 (UK); 978-0-345-47057-7 (NA); 981-260-153-8 (SG); 0-09-950412-X (UK)
Honorifics; 001. "The World of Beginnings" (始まりの世界, "Hajimari no Sekai"); 002. "The Price of Memory" (記憶の対価, "Kioku no Taika"); 003. "The Wings of Hitsuzen" (必然の羽根, "Hitsuzen no Hane"); 004. "The Strength to Fight" (戦うチカラ, "Tatakau Chikara"); 005. "The Instant of Awakening" (覚醒の瞬間, "Kakusei no Shunkan"); About the Creators; Past Works; Dramatis Personae; Translation Notes; Preview of Tsubasa Volume 2
When Sakura, princess of the Kingdom of Clow, goes to visit her childhood friend Syaoran in a ruins from the kingdom, a pair of ghostly wings appear from her and disintegrate. Clow's High Priest Yukito transports Syaoran and Sakura's catatonic body to the world from the Dimensional Witch Yūko Ichihara whom Syaoran begs for help to recover Sakura's feathers which would save her. She is also visited by the wizard Fai D. Flowright who wishes never to return to his world and Kurogane, a ninja who wishes to return to his world. The three pay for a means to travel throughout dimensions with Kurogane's being his sword, Fai's a magical tattoo, and Syaoran's all of the memories Sakura ever had about him. Yūko then presents them with a creature named Mokona Modoki that transports them to the republic of Hanshin where the group is hosted by the couple of Sorata and Arashi Arisugawa. As Mokona will not go to another world until finding a feather, Kurogane and Fai join Syaoran in investigating the city in search for the feather.
2	A World of Modern Mecha and Magic	October 16, 2003; 978-4-06-363306-1	August 31, 2004 (NA) — August 3, 2006 (UK); 978-0-345-47182-6 (NA); 981-260-208-9 (SG); 0-09-950413-8 (UK)
Honorifics Explained; 006. "Strength of the Heart" (心の強さ, "Kokoro no Tsuyosa"); 007. "Linked Worlds" (繋がる世界, "Tsunagaru Sekai"); 008. "The Country Where Gods Live" (神の宿る国, "Kami no Yadoru Kuni"); 009. "The Magician's Kudan" (魔術師の巧断, "Majutsushi no Kudan"); 010. "Where the Feather Went" (羽根の行方, "Hane no Yukue"); 011. "The Kudan of Fire" (炎の巧断, "Honoo no Kudan"); 012. "The Proof of Bravery" (勇者の証, "Yūsha no Akashi"); 013. "The Reason for Tears" (涙の理由, "Namida no Wake"); About the Creators; Past Works; Translation Notes; Preview of Tsubasa Volume 3
Syaoran uses a Kudan, god-like being controlled by Hanshin's citizens, to protect kid named Masayoshi Saito amidst a street fight. However, this gets the attention from Shōgo Asagi, a popular fighter, and thus all of the others. When continuing the search for the feather, Mokona and Masayoshi are kidnapped by Primera, an idol from Hanshin who wanted to get Syaoran in order to get Shōgo's attention. While Fai deals with Primera, Shōgo appears, and Mokona senses a feather inside a Kudan. Syaoran accepts Shōgo's challenge to a fight in order to get the feather, but later discovers it is Masayoshi's Kudan, an enormous replica of him that grows berserk, the one that has it. With Masayoshi's help, Syaoran retrieves the feather from the Kudan and returns it to Sakura. Sakura awakes from her sleep, but is unable to remember anything about her persona.
3	Can Pure Determination Defeat a Master Magician? Tsuginaru Sekai wa Hijutsu no Kuni!! (次なる世界は"秘術の国"!!, lit. The next world is "the country of secret arts"!!)	December 16, 2003; 978-4-06-363322-1	October 26, 2004 (NA) — August 3, 2006 (UK); 978-0-345-47183-3 (NA); 981-260-329-8 (SG); 0-09-950414-6 (UK)
Honorifics; 014. "Time to Get Under Way" (旅立ちの時, "Tabidachi no Toki"); 015. "The Secret Country" (秘術の国, "Hijutsu no Kuni"); 016. "Empty Memory" (虚ろの記憶, "Utsuro no Kioku"); 017. "The Source of Magic" (魔術の元, "Majutsu no Moto"); 018. "The Castle of Traps" (絡繰りの城, "Karakuri no Shiro"); 019. "The Strongest Kiishim" (最強の秘妖, "Saikyō no Kīshimu"); 020. "The Final Battle" (終局の戦闘, "Shūkyoku no Batoru"); 021. "The Mirror of the Greatest Love" (最愛の鏡, "Saiai no Kagami"); About the Creators; Translation Notes; Preview of Tsubasa Volume 4
Mokona transports Syaoran, Sakura, Fai and Kurogane to another dimension. They arrive in Koryo Country, where they are attacked by the son from the country's ruler, the "Ryanban". Chu'nyan, a girl opposing Ryanban's government, lets the group stay at her house. During another encounter with the Ryanban's son, Fai wonders if Ryanban possesses a feather to use as his energy source, and Syaoran decides to go his castle to take it alongside Fai and Kurogane. Once infiltrating, the trio is attacked by Kiishim, a sorceress under Ryanban's control. Fai and Kurogane allow Syaoran to continue to find Ryanban, while they face Kiishim. Kurogane manages to free Kiishim from Ryanban's control, while Syaoran defeats Ryanban's son and is attacked by citizens manipulated by his spell. Chu'nyan and Sakura also infiltrate in the castle, with the former stopping Ryanban's spell, leaving him at Syaoran's mercy.
4	A Fairy Tale Turned Nightmare! Kasuka ni Modorihajimeru Shōjo no Kioku!! (微かに戻り始める少女の記憶!!, lit. The girl's memories begin to faintly return!!)	February 15, 2004; 978-4-06-363338-2	January 25, 2005 (NA) — September 7, 2006 (UK); 978-0-345-47791-0 (NA); 981-260-352-2 (SG); 0-09-950492-8 (UK)
Honorifics; Previously in Tsubasa...; 022. "The End for Both" (互いの結末, "Tagai no Ketsumatsu"); 023. "The Country of Fog" (霧の国, "Kiri no Kuni"); 024. "Where the Smile Went" (笑顔の行方, "Egao no Yukue"); 025. "The Fairy Tale Country" (御伽の国, "Otogi no Kuni"); 026. "The Princess with Locks of Gold" (金の髪の姫, "Kin no Kami no Hime"); 027. "The Legend Continues" (伝説の続き, "Densetsu no Tsuzuki"); 028. "Two Princesses" (二人の姫, "Futari no Hime"); About the Creators; Translation Notes; Preview of Tsubasa Volume 5
Kiishim attacks Ryanban for making her prisoner, and Syaoran returns the feather to Sakura whose memories do not show him. Mokona then takes the group to another world to find a feather, but they find no civilization. After Syaoran finds a miniature city, Mokona realizes there is no energy besides that in the world. Transported now to the Spirit Town, the group learns a story regarding Princess Emerald who used a magical feather to take children to her castle. Doctor Kyle Rondart takes them to their house as they learn that children are disappearing again. Syaoran decides to investigate Emerald's story, while Sakura sees her at night, but falls unconscious due to her still weak state.
5	The End of a Fairy Tale; Tsui ni Akasareru Densetsu no Shinjitsu!! (ついに明かされる「伝説」の真実!!, lit. Finally the truth behind the "legend" is revealed!!)	April 15, 2004; 978-4-06-363363-4	April 26, 2005 (NA) — September 7, 2006 (UK); 978-0-345-47792-7 (NA); 981-260-410-3 (SG); 0-09-950493-6 (UK)
Honorifics; 029. "The Unquiet Castle" (不落の城, "Furaku no Shiro"); 030. "The Phantom Fairyland" (幻の御伽, "Maboroshi no Otogi"); 031. "The Final Attack" (最後の攻防, "Saigo no Kōbō"); 032. "The Never-ending Legend" (終わらない伝説, "Owaranai Densetsu"); 033. "The Night of the Storm" (嵐の夜, "Arashi no Yoru"); 034. "The Country of Sakura" (桜の国, "Sakura no Kuni"); 035. "Price Paid Cannot Be Returned" (戻らない対価, "Modoranai Taika"); About the Creators; Translation Notes; Preview of Tsubasa Volume 6
Sakura awakes in Emerald's castle where the disappeared children are hypnotized. Syaoran and Mokona trick Kyle to reveal that he is the culprit who hypnotized all of the town's children. Kyle escapes to the castle where Emerald, revealed as a spirit, shows that the children were used by Kyle to find Sakura's feather. Kyle tries to take it, is opposed by Syaoran's group. The castle then collapses, and while the citizens rescue the children, Syaoran and Sakura escape through a hidden passage shown by Emerald while being chased by Kyle. Before disappearing, Emerald gives Sakura her feather, and the group moves to another world. Now in Ōto Country, the group learns that people who eliminate the demons Oni are able to gain information from the country. Therefore, Syaoran and Kurogane become Oni Hunters, while Fai, Sakura and Mokona open a bar to help gather money and use it as the group's home.
6	Be Careful When the Sun Goes Down!	June 16, 2004; 978-4-06-363393-1	July 26, 2005 (NA) — October 5, 2006 (UK); 978-0-345-47793-4 (NA); 981-260-429-4 (SG); 0-09-950494-4 (UK)
Honorifics Explained; 036. "Lonely Eyes" (孤独の瞳, "Kodoku no Hitomi"); 037. "The Space Between Life and Death" (生と死の間, "Sei to Shi no Hazama"); 038. "The Shape of Happiness" (しあわせのカタチ, "Shiawase no Katachi"); 039. "A New Strength" (新たなる強さ, "Aratanaru Tsuyosa"); 040. "The Sword of Fire" (炎の剣, "Honoo no Ken"); 041. "Eternal Friends" (永遠の友, "Eien no Tomo"); 042. "The Unerasable Memory" (消せない記憶, "Kesenai Kioku"); About the Creators; Translation Notes; Preview of Tsubasa Volume 7
While Fai and Kurogane go to search information regarding the strongest Oni, Syaoran and Sakura befriend another group of Oni Hunters before all of them are attacked by various Oni. Following their victory, Syaoran requests Kurogane to teach him swordsmanship as he feels that his hand-to-hand style is not enough to successfully stop Oni as well to eliminate the weakness that his blind right eye gives him. While training, Syaoran and the Hunter Ryū-ō are attacked by several Oni, all of whom are commanded by a man named Seishirō who uses them to kill Hunters. As both are forced to escape to the bar, Syaoran reveals Seishirō is the man who taught him how to fight in the Kingdom of Clow.
7	Syaoran Overmatched! Yume to Genjitsu no Aida o Samayō Shōnen-tachi! (夢と現実の間を彷徨う少年達!!, lit. The young people who wander in the space between dreams and reality!!)	August 13, 2004; 978-4-06-363416-7	October 25, 2005 (NA) — October 5, 2006 (UK); 978-0-345-47797-2 (NA); 981-260-505-3 (SG); 0-09-950495-2 (UK)
Honorifics Explained; 043. "The Unseen Future" (見えない未来, "Mienai Mirai"); 044. "The Most Powerful Oni" (最強の鬼児, "Saikyō no Oni"); 045. "Parting Beneath the Cherry Trees" (決別の桜, "Ketsubetsu no Sakura"); 046. "The World of Dreams" (夢の世界, "Yume no Sekai"); 047. "The Distant Sunset" (遠き落日, "Tooki Rakujitsu"); 048. "The End of the Dream" (夢の終わり, "Yume no Owari"); 049. "The Final Enemy" (最後の敵, "Saigo no Teki"); About the Creators; Translation Notes; Preview of Tsubasa Volume 8
Syaoran and Kurogane go hunt Oni to find information regarding Seishirō. Meanwhile, Seishirō enters into the group's bar, with his Oni attacking Fai. As they return, Syaoran and Kurogane learn that Fai's body disappeared, and that Seishirō wanted to challenge Syaoran. Syaoran accepts the challenge, but is seemingly killed by him. Syaoran awakes to find Fai who reveals that Ōto is a virtual reality world inside the Edonis Country in which first-time players have their memories erased. Both learn that ever since Seishirō's arrived in Ōto, the country's nature changed, materializing the Oni in Edonis, using one of Sakura's feather. As all the players reappear in Edonis, Kurogane confronts Seishirō, but both are interrupted by Oruha, manager of the game. Seishirō requests her information about the vampires, whom he has been searching across the game, but she states she does not have any. Seishirō leaves to another world as he also obtained such ability from Yūko, while Syaoran's group also leaves.
8	Into the Mouth of the Beast; Jukai no Mamono ga Shaoran no Yukute o Habamu! (樹海の魔物が小狼の行く手を阻む!, lit. The demons of the forest block Syaoran's path!)	November 16, 2004; 978-4-06-363452-5	January 31, 2006 (NA) — June 5, 2008 (UK); 978-0-345-48428-4 (NA); 981-260-505-3 (SG); 0-09-950496-0 (UK)
Honorifics Explained; 050. "The Country of Totems" (偶像の国, "Gūzō no Kuni"); 051. "The Form of the Beast" (魔物の正体, "Mamono no Shōtai"); 052. "A Gift from the Beast" (魔物の贈り物, "Mamono no Okurimono"); 053. "The Two Powers" (二つの力, "Futatsu no Chikara"); 054. "The Two Gods" (二人の神, "Futari no Kami"); 055. "God's Tears" (神の涙, "Kami no Namida"); 056. "Men and Women" (男と女, "Otoko to Onna"); 057. "Two Lines Never Meeting" (交わらない線, "Majiwaranai Sen"); "Tsubasa: World of the Untold Story" (ツバサ 語られなかった世界, "Tsubasa: Katararenakatta Sekai"); About the Creators; Translation Notes; Preview of Tsubasa volume 9
In another world, Syaoran's group meets a group of small talking animals who tell them that they wanted to use a sacrifice to stop a demon that was attacking them. The group searches for it only to find it is a tornado, and Sakura is able to communicate with it so that it will stop attacking the animals. Upon returning, the animals give them a feather they found, which makes Kurogane speculate all the journey has been observed. Now moved to the Shara Country, Syaoran, Sakura and Mokona are separated from Kurogane and Fai, with both groups allowed to stay in two inns that oppose each other. Both inns are in conflict due to a belief that their statues of the gods Ashura and Yasha are causing earthquakes because of the opposing one, and try to destroy them.
9	In the Gods' Hands; Higeki wa Haruka na Sekai o Koe Rin'neshitsuzukeru!! (悲劇は遥かな世界を超え輪廻し続ける!!, lit. The tragedy crosses the distant world and continues to be reborn...!!)	February 16, 2005; 978-4-06-363485-3	April 25, 2006 (NA) — June 5, 2008 (UK); 978-0-345-48429-1 (NA); 981-260-686-6 (SG); 0-09-950499-5 (UK)
Honorifics Explained; 058. "The World of Heaven" (天の世界, "Ten no Sekai"); 059. "The Ruler's Invitation" (王の招き, "Ō no Maneki"); 060. "The Depths of the Heart" (心の奥, "Kokoro no Oku"); 061. "The Strongest Two" (最強の二人, "Saikyō no Futari"); 062. "The Strength of a Desire" (望みの強さ, "Nozomi no Tsuyosa"); 063. "Another Young Man" (もう一人の少年, "Mō Hitori no Shōnen"); 064. "The Interrupted Memory" (途切れた記憶, "Togireta Kioku"); 065. "When Time Starts Moving" (動き始める刻, "Ugokihajimeru Toki"); About the Creators; Translation Notes
The sky begins to open as Mokona transports Syaoran and Sakura to another dimension. They arrive in the Shara Country, where Ashura and Yasha are the leaders from their respective clans in war, while Fai and Kurogane are warriors assisting Yasha. With Mokona sensing a feather, Syaoran requests their host Ashura to let him join to his clan in order to find it as well as meet Fai and Kurogane. However, he ends fighting against Fai and Kurogane who do not respond to any of his questions. During a second encounter between the two clans, Ashura kills Yasha who does not attempt to fight back.
10	Time Will Tell; Sekai no Katasumi ni Kodamasuru Ō no Sakebi――!! (世界の片隅に谺する王の叫び――!!, lit. The king's yell resounds to the corners of the world――!!)	May 15, 2005; 978-4-06-363530-0	July 25, 2006 (NA) — June 5, 2008 (UK); 978-0-345-48430-7 (NA); 981-260-828-1 (SG); 0-09-950498-7 (UK)
Honorifics Explained; 066. "Eternal Emotions" (永遠の想い, "Towa no Omoi"); 067. "The Gods' Beginning" (神の始まり, "Kami no Hajimari"); 068. "Feelings that Cross Space and Time" (時空を越える想い, "Jikū o Koeru Omoi"); 069. "A World that Begins to Turn" (回り始める世界, "Mawarihajimeru Sekai"); 070. "Another Me" (もう一人の自分, "Mō Hitori no Jibun"); 071. "What Must Be Done Now" (今成すべき事, "Ima Nasubeki Koto"); 072. "The One Impossible to Forget" (忘れ得ぬ人, "Wasureenu Hito"); 073. "The Power of Two" (二人の力, "Futari no Chikara"); "Tsubasa: The Unchronicled World 3" (ツバサ 語られなかった世界 3, "Tsubasa: Katararenakatta Sekai 3"); About the Creators; Translation Notes
Yasha dissolves to reveal he was an illusion created by Sakura's feather, with the real Yasha having died some time ago. Ashura returns the feather to Syaoran, and decides to commit suicide when being unable to revive Yasha. Before dying, Ashura pays Yūko so that he and Yasha become gods for the citizens. Syaoran finds Fai and Kurogane, with the former revealing the latter wanted to train Syaoran in the previous fights, and all the group then returns to Shura. Syaoran realizes he changed the future from Shura, as he requested in Shara that both Yasha and Ashura had to be together, and thus the conflict between the two groups never occurred. Mokona then transports them to Piffle World where the winner of the Dragonfly Race, race that uses flying vehicles known as Dragonflies, will win a feather. Syaoran, Sakura, Fai and Kurogane enter into the preliminaries of the air race in order to win the feather.
11	Riding On the Wings of a Dragonfly; Sakura no Hane wa Mottomo Tsuyoku Hayakimono ni!! (さくらの羽根は最も強く速き物に!!, lit. To the strongest and fastest one, Sakura's feather!!)	August 13, 2005; 978-4-06-363563-8	October 31, 2006 (NA) — June 5, 2008 (UK); 978-0-345-48528-1 (NA); 981-4204-20-X (SG); 0-09-950497-9 (UK)
074. "Your Strength" (君の強さ, "Kimi no Tsuyosa"); 075. "The Dream of Contentment" (幸せな夢, "Shiawasena Yume"); 076. "The Time to Overcome" (克服の時, "Kokufuku no Toki"); 077. "The Blissful Breeze" (至福の風, "Shifuku no Kaze"); 078. "The Princess and the Witch" (姫と魔女, "Hime to Majo"); 079. "The Goddess of Victory" (勝利の女神, "Shōri no Megami"); 080. "The Start of the Deciding Race" (決戦の火蓋, "Kessen no Hibuta"); 081. "The Unseen Cheater" (見えない干渉者, "Mienai Kanshōsha"); 082. "The First to Fall" (最初に落ちる物, "Saisho ni Ochirumono"); About the Creators; Translation Notes
As Syaoran, Sakura, Fai and Kurogane manage to pass to the finals, they meet the other participants who are identical to people they previously met. The participants suspect somebody is interfering with the race, having already caused various incidents. The organizer, Tomoyo Daidouji, decides to continue the race, stating that her team will make sure the culprit will be stopped. In the finals, the culprit continues causing accidents reducing the number of participants, while Fai gives up when his Dragonfly is damaged.
12	Dragonfly Battle; Kakenukero! Kurō no Himegimi!! (駆け抜けろ!玖楼の姫君!!, lit. Break through! Princess of Clow!!)	October 15, 2005; 978-4-06-363586-7	January 30, 2007 (NA) — June 5, 2008 (UK); 978-0-345-48532-8 (NA); 981-4204-89-7 (SG); 0-09-950629-7 (UK)
Honorifics Explained; 083. "The Final Obstacle" (最後の難関, "Saigo no Nankan"); 084. "The Eye of the Heart" (心の眼, "Kokoro no Me"); 085. "The Fighting Princess" (戦いの姫君, "Tatakai no Himegimi"); 086. "The Flag of Honor" (栄光の旗, "Eikō no Hata"); 087. "The Banquet of Smiles" (笑顔の宴, "Egao no Utage"); 088. "The One Who Travels Worlds" (次元を渡る者, "Jigen o Watarumono"); 089. "The False Reason" (偽りの理由, "Itsuwari no Wake"); 090. "The Message for the Princess" (姫への伝言, "Hime e no Dengon"); "Tsubasa: World of the Untold Story #4" (ツバサ 語られなかった世界 4, "Tsubasa: Katararenakatta Sekai 4"); About the Creators; Translation Notes
Syaoran is forced to damage his Dragonfly in order to save a participant identical to Ryū-ō in the middle of another accident, and so, is disqualified. Kurogane's Dragonfly is hit by geyser, but although it is damaged, he remains without wounds. Sakura manages to win the race, and is rewarded with her feather. After its ending, Tomoyo confesses she was the culprit as aided by various racers. Some time ago, Tomoyo met Kurogane's lord, Princess Tomoyo, in a dream and was told by her about how Syaoran's group would come to get the feather. In order to give the feather in a fair way to the group, the race was organized, although the last incidents were actually made by Kyle Rondart who kept pursuing Syaoran's group.
13	This Book's a Real Trip! Shōnen to Kioku no Hon! (少年と「記憶の本」!, lit. A boy and the "Book of Memories"!)	February 15, 2006; 978-4-06-363620-8	June 12, 2007 (NA) — June 5, 2008 (UK); 978-0-345-48533-5 (NA); 981-269-129-4 (SG); 0-09-950643-2 (UK)
Honorifics Explained; 091. "The World of Memory" (記憶の世界, "Kioku no Sekai"); 092. "The Boy in the Country of the Book" (本の国の少年, "Hon no Kuni no Shōnen"); 093. "The Strength to Protect" (守る為の強さ, "Mamorutame no Tsuyosa"); 094. "Father and Son" (父と子, "Chichi to Ko"); 095. "The Eternal Prayer" (永遠の祈り, "Eien no Inori"); 096. "The Young Man's Howl" (少年の咆哮, "Shōnen no Hōkō"); 097. "The Young Man and the Princess" (少年と姫, "Shōnen to Hime"); 098. "The Final Promise" (最後の約束, "Saigo no Yakusoku"); 099. "The Unending Yesterday" (終わらない昨日, "Owaranai Kinō"); "Tsubasa: World of the Untold Story #5" (ツバサ 語られなかった世界 5, "Tsubasa: Katararenakatta Sekai 5"); About the Creators; Translation Notes; Preview of Volume 14
The group moves to Lecourt Country, which investigates magic and all their information is kept in a library. When visiting it, Syaoran receives a blank book from Kurogane, and is transported to the Suwa Province. He realizes the book is forcing him watch Kurogane's memories, and sees his childhood, in which he lived alongside his father, Suwa's lord, and his mother, a miko. The area was one night attacked by various demons, and when Kurogane's father went to hunt them, Kurogane's mother was killed by an unknown person able travel through dimensions. After realizing that his father was devoured by demons, Kurogane started attacking everybody around him, until being calmed by Princess Tomoyo, whom he would work for. After seeing all the memories, Syaoran apologizes to Kurogane. He realizes that the person who killed Kurogane's mother wore an outfit design similar to the people who attacked Kingdom of Clow, before he was transported to Yūko's shop.
14	If They Won't Let Us Borrow It... Kioku no Hon Datsukai Sakusen Kaishi! (「記憶の本」奪回作戦開始!, lit. The plan to retrieve the "Book of Memories" begins!)	April 17, 2006; 978-4-06-363655-0	July 31, 2007 (NA) — June 5, 2008 (UK); 978-0-345-48534-2 (NA); 981-269-209-6 (SG); 0-09-950647-5 (UK)
Honorifics Explained; 100. "The Dream of a Bat" (蝙蝠のユメ, "Kōmori no Yume"); 101. "The Book Sheltered by Magic" (魔力の宿る本, "Maryoku no Yadoru Hon"); 102. "The Whistling Magician" (魔術師の口笛, "Majutsushi no Kuchibue"); 103. "The Ruins of Memory" (思い出の遺跡, "Omoide no Iseki"); 104. "The Troubled Pair" (困った二人, "Komatta Futari"); 105. "The Vanished Magic" (消えた魔法, "Kieta Mahō"); 106. "The Escape with No Tomorrow" (明日なき逃避行, "Asunaki Tōhikō"); 107. "Unrecovered Memory" (蘇らぬ記憶, "Yomigaeranu Kioku"); 108. "The Country on Shifting Sands" (砂上の国, "Sajō no Kuni"); About the Creators; Translation Notes
The group learns that the book that Syaoran read is a replica from the one that has Sakura's feather which gave it such powers. As the book is a national treasure from Lecourt, Syaoran decides to steal it, and the group infiltrates into its library. As they get closer to it, Syaoran and Kurogane split in order to fight alone the beast protecting the book. Defeating the guardian, Syaoran takes the feather from the book, but upon returning it to Sakura, the group is attacked by more beasts. Fai decides to use his magic to protect all of them despite he swore he would not use it again, and Mokona transports them to another dimension. Upon arriving to a postapocalyptic-like Tokyo, Syaoran is attacked by people living in an old City Hall who see him as a thief.
15	Once a City, Now a Wasteland... Kanashiki Kōsō no Riyū wa!? (哀しき抗争の理由は!?, lit. The reason for the sorrowful resistance is...!?)	July 14, 2006; 978-4-06-363691-8	October 30, 2007 (NA); October 9, 2007 (SG); 978-0-345-49831-1 (NA); 981-269-397-1 (SG)
Honorifics Explained; 109. "Child of the Gods" (神の子, "Kami no Ko"); 110. "Something That Cannot Be Given" (渡せぬもの, "Watasenumono"); 111. "The Water Capital" (水の都, "Mizu no Miyako"); 112. "The Magician's Real Face" (魔術師の素顔, "Majutsushi no Sugao"); 113. "The Frozen Heart" (凍てつく心, "Itetsuku Kokoro"); 114. "The Imprisoned Princess" (囚われの姫, "Toraware no Hime"); 115. "The Mingling Pair" (交錯する二人, "Kōsakusuru Futari"); 116. "The Breaking Dream" (壊れかけた夢, "Kowarekaketa Yume"); "Tsubasa: World of the Untold Story #6" (ツバサ 語られなかった世界 6, "Tsubasa: Katararenakatta Sekai 6"); About the Creators; Translation Notes
Kamui, the leader from the City Hall's faction, attacks Kurogane, but stops when his group is confronted by the Tower's faction's leader Fūma. After the Tower's faction retreats, the City Hall members allow Syaoran's group to stay with them, as they explain the two groups are battling for the water, which is the world's most important resource. While recovering, Syaoran, Fai and Mokona join them in search for food in the area. Meanwhile, a teenager identical to Syaoran escapes from a prison in an unknown world and is sent by a woman named Xing Huo to Yūko's shop. The teenager asks Yūko to send him to the person who possesses his right eye, and is sent to another dimension. Back in Tokyo, Sakura's soul appears in the City Hall's water reservoir just as Mokona senses another feather.
16	The Friendship Breaks! Shukumei no Kaikō ni Sekai ga Shinkan suru!! (宿命の邂逅に世界が震撼する!!, lit. The world shakes in the fated chance encounter!!)	September 15, 2006; 978-4-06-363716-8	February 5, 2008 (NA); October 30, 2007 (SG); 978-0-345-50148-6 (NA); 981-269-502-8 (SG)
Honorifics Explained; 117. "The Wandering Soul" (彷徨する魂, "Hōkōsuru Tamashii"); 118. "Beloved Vampire" (愛しき吸血鬼, "Itoshiki Kyūketsuki"); 119. "The Boy Fades Away" (消えゆく少年, "Kieyuku Shōnen"); 120. "The Unheard Voice" (聞こえない声, "Kikoenai Koe"); 121. "The Sound of Death" (死の音色, "Shi no Neiro"); 122. "The Memories of a Right Eye" (右目の思い出, "Migime no Omoide"); 123. "Separating Hearts" (離れる心, "Hanareru Kokoro"); 124. "The Price of a Life" (命の対価, "Inochi no Taika"); About the Creators; Translation Notes
Sakura absorbs a feather located in the reservoir, just as Kamui tries to attack the cocoon where she is. Syaoran stops him, and both start fighting. In the fight's outcome, a seal located in Syaoran's right eye starts breaking as it is revealed that Syaoran is a clone; the original Syaoran sealed a copy of his "heart" within the clone before being imprisoned by the sorcerer Fei-Wang Reed years ago. Fai tries to restore the clone's heart, but Syaoran instead takes and eats Fai's right eye to wield his magic. Syaoran continues attacking Fai and Kurogane until the original Syaoran appears in Tokyo as sent by Yūko. The original Syaoran tries to kill the clone, but fails upon hesitation. The Syaoran clone then takes another feather in the cocoon where Kamui's twin, Subaru, was sleeping and gives it to Sakura before leaving alone to another world through Fei-Wang's portal. The City Hall's people then try to heal the wounded, but are unable to save Fai.
17	Battle at Death's Door! Majutsushi ni Todoke! Atsuki Ninja no Omoi! (魔術師に届け!熱き忍者の想い!, lit. Reach the magician! The heated feelings of the ninja!)	November 17, 2006; 978-4-06-363744-1	May 13, 2008 (NA); April 8, 2008 (SG); 978-0-345-50165-3 (NA); 978-981-276-233-7 (SG)
Honorifics Explained; 125. "The Sound of Life" (生命の音, "Inochi no Oto"); 126. "Life That Ends" (終わりある生, "Owariaru Sei"); 127. "One's Greatest Wish" (一番の望み, "Ichiban no Nozomi"); 128. "The Two Hunters" (二人の狩人, "Futari no Hantā"); 129. "Night in the Capital" (都の夜, "Miyako no Yoru"); 130. "Stepping Over the Line" (踏み越えた線, "Fumikoeta Sen"); 131. "Guilty Consciences" (罪深き者達, "Tsumibukaki Monotachi"); 132. "The Fear of Belief" (信じる怖さ, "Shinjiru Kowasa"); About the Creators; Translation Notes
With Subaru wishing to restore the water lost in the reservoir, Yūko tells Kurogane to make that wish in exchange of having him give his vampire blood to Fai to regenerate his wound. Kamui accepts to give his blood, and Fai becomes a vampire who would take Kurogane's blood to survive. As Fai rests from his mutation, Fūma appears with a feather, negotiating to let his people stay in the City Hall in exchange of using the feather to protect the building. Sakura states she does not need it and requests to make the payment for Subaru's wish. Yūko enlists Sakura to search for an egg located in Tokyo. After various encounters with giants worms from the area, Sakura finds the egg an returns to the City Hall.
18	A Deadly Game of Chess! Subete wa Yume no tame!? (全ては「夢」のため!?, lit. Everything was for the sake of "Dreams"!?)	March 16, 2007; 978-4-06-363790-8	July 22, 2008 (NA); August 12, 2008 (SG); 978-0-345-50409-8 (NA); 978-981-276-555-0 (SG)
Honorifics Explained; 133. "The Journey's Path" (旅の行方, "Tabi no Yukue"); 134. "The One and Only" (唯一の存在, "Yuiitsu no Sonzai"); 135. "The Criss-crossing Future" (交錯する未来, "Kōsakusuru Mirai"); 136. "The Knights on the Game Board" (盤上の騎士達, "Banjō no Kishitachi"); 137. "The Shoulder the Princess Leans on" (姫を支える, "Hime o Sasaeru"); 138. "The Long Lineage" (語り継ぐ血筋, "Kataritsugu Chisuji"); 139. "The Girl in the Maze" (迷宮の少女, "Meikyū no Shōjo"); 140. "The Victory with No Joy" (歓喜なき勝利, "Kankinaki Shōri"); About the Creators; Translation Notes
Upon receiving the egg, Yūko explains to Sakura's group that Fei-Wang is the responsible for the loss of her memory, the creation of Syaoran, and the deaths from Kurogane's parents, and thus, starting their journey. Even though Fei-Wang's purpose is to make Sakura recover all her feather to unleash their full power, Sakura decides to continue her journey to save the Syaoran clone. Kurogane, Fai and Mokona decide to stay with her, while the original Syaoran joins them for his own purposes. The group then participates into a "chess" tournament run by the mafia in which Sakura control the original Syaoran, Fai and Kurogane in battles against other groups. They plan to win the tournament in order to exchange the prize to Yūko for a wish to restore a country the Syaoran clone previously destroyed in search for the feather.
19	The Queen's Checkmate! Hime wa Tomo no Mirai o Kaerareru no ka!? (姫は友の未来を変えられるのか!?, lit. Can the princess change her friends' future!?)	June 15, 2007; 978-4-06-363837-0	November 18, 2008 (NA); October 14, 2008 (SG); 978-0-345-50579-8 (NA); 978-981-276-556-7 (SG)
Honorifics Explained; 141. "The Momentary Fugitive" (儚き当方者, "Hakanaki Tōhōsha"); 142. "The Solitary Princess" (孤独な姫君, "Kodokuna Himegimi"); 143. "The Future Decision" (未来の選択, "Mirai no Sentaku"); 144. "The Most Important" (一番大切なもの, "Ichiban Taisetsunamono"); 145. "The Unraveling World" (綻び始める世界, "Hokorobihajimeru Sekai"); 146. "That Which Was Seen in a Dream" (夢で視たもの, "Yume de Mitamono"); 147. "The Three Worlds" (三つの世界, "Mittsu no Sekai"); 148. "The Two Choices" (二つの選択肢, "Futatsu no Sentakushi"); 149. "The Beloved Future" (愛すべき未来, "Aisubeki Mirai"); About the Creators; Translation Notes
As the group gets to the finals, Sakura has a talk with Eagle, the tournament's manager, and reveals that as the prize she wants to travel to another dimension, splitting from her companions. Moreover, before the tournament's start, she had told Yūko she wanted to go a specific dimension in order to change a future she foresaw previously, but kept it hidden from the others. In the finals, Eagle convinces Sakura to have a one-on-one match, and the original Syaoran decides to participate. He fights a cybernetic doll controlled by Eagle, and becomes victorious. As the prize, Eagle gives Sakura Chī, a girl created by a feather, and Sakura uses her to leave Infinity alongside another Chī Fai hid in his world, Seresu. Before Sakura leaves, Fai impales her as a result of a curse Fei-Wang placed him to kill anybody whose magic power would surpass his. Sakura survives to the attack as her soul and body are split and sent to different worlds.
20	The Trial of the Traitor!	August 17, 2007; 978-4-06-363864-6	January 27, 2009 (NA); November 25, 2008 (SG); 978-0-345-50580-4 (NA); 978-981-276-557-4 (SG)
Honorifics Explained; 150. "Those Left Behind" (残された者たち, "Nokosareta Monotachi"); 151. "A Lie in the Rain" (雨の中の嘘, "Ame no Naka no Uso"); 152. "Four Prices Paid" (四つの対価, "Yottsu no Taika"); 153. "The Most Painful" (最も辛いこと, "Mottomo Tsuraikoto"); 154. "The Magician Returns" (魔術師の帰還, "Majutsushi no Kikan"); 155. "The Damned Twins" (禍々しき双子, "Magamagashiki Futago"); 156. "The Beginning of Sorrow" (不幸の始まり, "Fukō no Hajimari"); 157. "The Final Choice" (最後の選択, "Saigo no Sentaku"); 158. "One Other Curse" (もう一つの呪い, "Mō Hitotsu no Noroi"); About the Creators; Translation Notes
Yūko informs the group that Sakura's soul has gone to the Dream World, with hopes that the Syaoran clone would to get its feather. Her body on the other hand went to Seresu, as Fai confesses he kept feathers there. The original Syaoran, Kurogane and Mokona go with Fai to Seresu and find Sakura's body. There, the group is confronted by Ashura-ō, Fai's king who he has been running away throughout the series. Ashura-ō then shows the group Fai's childhood, revealing he was born as an identical twin in the world of Valeria. The birth from the twins was a bad omen to the country, and both were imprisoned them within a tower. As time went on, all of Valeria's citizens were killed by the mad king, and Fei-Wang gave one of the twins the chance to leave, which ended in Fai's death. The other twin, Yūi, would be later rescued by Ashura-ō taking Fai's name before receiving two curses by Fei-Wang.
21	Fai the Cursed!	November 16, 2007; 978-4-06-363877-6	April 28, 2009 (NA); April 7, 2009 (SG); 978-0-345-50809-6 (NA); 978-981-276-558-1 (SG)
Honorifics Explained; 159. "The Magician's Lie" (魔術師の嘘, "Majutsushi no Uso"); 160. "A Promise for a Day Long Off" (遠い日の約束, "Tooi Hi no Yakusoku"); 161. "Smiling Wizardry" (笑顔と魔法, "Egao to Mahō"); 162. "The Past Unraveled" (綻びた過去, "Hokorobita Kako"); 163. "The Unfulfillable Promise" (果たせぬ約束, "Hatasenu Yakusoku"); 164. "Kindheartedness and Weakness" (優しさと弱さ, "Yasashisa to Yowasa"); 165. "The Tower of Memory" (記憶の塔, "Kioku no Tō"); 166. "The Closed World" (閉じた世界, "Tojita Sekai"); About the Creators; Translation Notes
The flashback reveals that Fei-Wang told Fai that if he wanted to revive his twin, he would have to go on a journey to recover Sakura's memories, and kill Kurogane as both would oppose. Following such revelation, Kurogane and Fai turn against each other, while Syaoran collapses due to a curse that Fei-Wang placed so that no other magician besides Fai and Ashura-ō would move. Across the flashback it is revealed that Ashura-ō also grew mad and killed each of Seresu's citizens, having taken care of Fai so that he would kill him due to Fei-Wang's first curse. Ashura-ō tries to kill Fai's friends, forcing him to turn against him. In the fight's outcome, Kurogane kills Ashura-ō before Fai could do it activating Fei-Wang's second curse starts sealing Seresu from all other worlds. Fai and Mokona try to transport all of them to another world, but due to Fai's magic not being strong enough to send himself, Kurogane amputates his left arm to exchange it for Fai's place.
22	Rematch! Saiaishita Shukuteki o Mae ni, Shaoran wa!? (再会した宿敵を前に、小狼は!?, lit. Before his rival whom he met again, Syaoran is...!?)	January 17, 2008; 978-4-06-363878-3	July 28, 2009 (NA); June 16, 2009 (SG); 978-0-345-51038-9 (NA); 978-981-276-559-8 (SG)
Honorifics Explained; 167. "The Wounded Ninja" (傷つきし忍, "Kizutsukishi Shinobi"); 168. "A Promise in a Dream" (夢の中の約束, "Yume no Naka no Yakusoku"); 169. "A Delivery from a Witch" (魔女の贈り物, "Majo no Okurimono"); 170. "The Second Messenger" (二人目の使者, "Futarime no Shisha"); 171. "The Beautiful Battlefield" (美しき戦場, "Utsukushiki Senjō"); 172. "The Crumbling of Reason" (崩れ始めた理, "Kuzurehajimeta Kotowari"); 173. "The Wish To Overturn" (覆らぬ願い, "Kutsugaeranu Negai"); 174. "The Path Believed In" (信じるべき道, "Shinjirubeki Michi"); About the Creators; Translation Notes
The group awakes in Japan, Kurogane's and Tomoyo's world, as Tomoyo and Fai had previously paid Yūko to go a safe world after Seresu to take care of the group's wounds. Fai also gives his right eye's magic to Yūko in exchange for an artificial arm for Kurogane as delivered by Fūma, while Seishirō appears to learn about the location from the vampire twins, Kamui and Subaru. The original Syaoran challenges Seishirō to a battle to take his feather, and is able to do it in order to create an entrance to the Dream World. There, he finds Sakura's soul and Yūko's assistant, Kimihiro Watanuki, before the arrival of the Syaoran clone. When Watanuki disappears from the world, the Syaoran clone tries to take the original's feather, and both start fighting.
23	Wake Up Call! Shitō! Futari no Shaoran (死闘!二人の小狼, lit. Death match! The two Syaorans)	March 17, 2008; 978-4-06-363879-0	October 27, 2009 (NA); September 7, 2009 (SG); 978-0-345-51230-7 (NA); 978-981-276-560-4 (SG)
175. "Crossed Blades" (交わる剣, "Majiwaru Tsurugi"); 176. "The Unmoving Body" (動かぬ躯, "Ugokanu Karada"); 177. "The Unending Dream" (醒めない夢, "Samenai Yume"); 178. "One More Trap" (もう一つの罠, "Mō Hitotsu no Wana"); 179. "Two Images" (二つの写身, "Futatsu no Utsushimi"); 180. "The Princess's Location" (姫の在る場所, "Hime no Aru Basho"); 181. "The Country of the Future" (未来の国, "Mirai no Kuni"); 182. "The Night of the Vow" (誓いの夜, "Chikai no Yoru")
The two Syaorans continue fighting, damaging the Dream World's entrance with their attacks. As both appear outside the Dream World, and try to finish each other, Sakura's soul receives the clone's blow. While her soul disintegrates, Sakura reveals that she is a clone from the original Sakura, the person the original Syaoran has been searching for. As Sakura's soul is destroyed, Kyle appears and takes her body to Fei-Wang who plans to use the power it stored with the feathers. The original Syaoran, Fai and Kurogane try to ask Yūko about Fei-Wang's location, but she states that Watanuki already paid for that information. Yūko tells them that Fei-Wang is located in the "cut-off" time from the Kingdom of Clow, and so the original Syaoran, Fai, Kurogane and Mokona prepare to leave Japan.
24	Time Out! Iza, Kessen no Chi e! (いざ、決戦の地へ!, lit. Now, to place of the duel!)	July 17, 2008; 978-4-06-384008-7	October 27, 2009 (NA); October 20, 2009 (SG); 978-0-345-51715-9 (NA); 978-981-276-800-1 (SG)
183. "The World of Sand" (砂の世界, "Suna no Sekai"); 184. "Separated Time" (切り取られた時間, "Kiritorareta Jikan"); 185. "Repeating Time" (繰り返す時間, "Kurikaesu Jikan"); 186. "Stagnant Time" (進まない時間, "Susumanai Jikan"); 187. "The Consequences of Wishes" (願いの報い, "Negai no Mukui"); 188. "The Ruins of That Day" (あの日の遺跡, "Ano Hi no Iseki"); 189. "Inherited Resolve" (受け継がれし覚悟, "Uketsugareshi Kakugo"); 190. "Those Who Know the World" (世界を知る者達, "Sekai o Shiru Monotachi"); 191. "The Seven-Day Promise" (七日間の約束, "Nanokakan no Yakusoku")
Yūko creates the way to let Mokona transport the group to Fei-Wang's location in the Kingdom of Clow. There, the four find people repeatedly living the same day, making Syaoran realize it is his fault for having made a wish. Syaoran takes the others to the ruins' reservoir in which time is frozen. He then tells Fai, Kurogane and Mokona how this occurred, starting with his first visit to Yūko's shop when he was younger. Syaoran visited Yūko as his mother had foreseen a future involving him in another dimension alongside a person who was waiting for him. Yūko then sent Syaoran to the Kingdom of Clow for a week, where he met the original Sakura who was in a ritual. Both of them began to bond, as Sakura's parents allowed Syaoran to stay with them as Sakura's mother, Nadeshiko, had also foreseen his arrival.
25	Fighting Fate! Unmei no Nanokame ga Futari o Matsu!? (運命の七日目が二人を待つ!?, lit. The fated seventh day awaits the two!?)	November 17, 2008; 978-4-06-384060-5	January 26, 2010 (NA); January 6, 2010 (SG); 978-0-345-51716-6 (NA); 978-981-276-846-9 (SG)
192. "Overflowing Memories" (溢れ出す記憶, "Afuredasu Kioku"); 193. "Seventh Birthday" (7回目の誕生日, "Nanakaime no Tanjōbi"); 194. "The Tone That Calls the Princess" (姫を呼ぶ音色, "Hime o Yobu Neiro"); 195. "The Border of The World" (世界の境, "Sekai no Sakai"); 196. "A Moment's Hesitation" (一瞬の迷い, "Isshun no Mayoi"); 197. "Two Lives" (二つの命, "Futatsu no Inochi"); 198. "Invisible Mark" (見えない印, "Mienai Shirushi"); 199. "The Power to Survive" (生き抜く力, "Ikinuku Chikara"); 200. "Halted Time" (止まった時間, "Tomatta Jikan")
As the week was reaching its end, Fei-Wang appeared in Clow and placed a curse in Sakura that would consume her life. Syaoran tried to stop him, but was seriously wounded and sent back to Yūko's shop due to the time limit he had. Syaoran once again requested Yūko to send to Clow to search for a way to save Sakura although this time he would have no means to go back. As years went on, neither Syaoran or Sakura's parents were able to stop the curse, while Sakura did not know she had it. As the curse was about activate, Nadeshiko tried to freeze the time, while Syaoran was told by Fei-Wang he could turn it back to before the curse was placed.
26	Life Wish! Futatabi Hime no Te o Tsukamu Tame ni! (再び姫の手を掴む為に!, lit. To grasp the princess' hand again!)	March 17, 2009; 978-4-06-384108-4	April 27, 2010 (NA); January 20, 2010 (SG); 978-0-345-52070-8 (NA); 978-981-276-846-9 (SG)
201. "The Truth within the Ruins" (遺跡の中の真実, "Iseki no Naka no Shinjitsu"); 202. "Distorted Wish" (歪んだ願い, "Yuganda Negai"); 203. "Those By My Side" (側にいる者, "Soba ni iru Mono"); 204. "Wishes Upon Wishes" (重なり合う願い, "Kasanariau Negai"); 205. "Crumbled Providence" (壊れた摂理, "Kowareta Setsuri"); 206. "The Current Future" (今在る未来, "Ima Aru Mirai"); 207. "Evolving Incarnation" (進化する化身, "Shinka suru Keshin"); 208. "Unreaching Blade" (届かぬ刃, "Todokanu Yaiba"); 209. "The Demon King and the Puppet" (魔王と傀儡, "Maō to Kugutsu"); 210. "The Wanted Words" (知りたい言葉, "Shiritai Kotoba")
Yūko conceded Syaoran's wish of turning back the time but at the cost of his freedom to Fei-Wang who took him prisoner to create his clone. Watanuki was used to replace Syaoran in his original world, while Syaoran waited until the time he would be freed to search for Sakura. As a result of his wish, Syaoran states that he changed the history of many people, including Kurogane and Fai, but they stay with him, saying he should assume blame for that. The group finds the original Sakura frozen in time about to be attacked by the curse, and are confronted by the Syaoran clone and Fei-Wang's other artificial beings. As all start fighting, the Syaoran clone overwhelms his original self as well as Fai and Kurogane. He then takes the original's body to Fei-Wang only to allow him to ambush him. Fei-Wang tries to kill the original Syaoran, but his clone receives the attack, causing his body to be destroyed as he apologizes to all his friends.
27	The Restart of Time! Ō no Yabō o Kudake! (王の野望を砕け! lit. Crush the king's ambitions!)	May 15, 2009; 978-4-06-384134-3	July 27, 2010 (NA); March 23, 2010 (SG); 978-0-345-52071-5 (NA); 978-981-4297-82-0 (SG)
211. "The Scorched Smile" (焼き付いた笑顔, "Yakitsuita Egao"); 212. "Unfrozen Time" (動き出した時間, "Ugokidashita Jikan"); 213. "Unparalleled Power" (比類なき力, "Hiruinaki Chikara") (Note: These chapters are not labeled with a subtitle in the normal edition.); 214. "The Last Chain" (最後の鎖, "Saigo no Kusari"); 215. "The True Being" (真の存在, "Shin no Sonzai"); 216. "The Space Between Life and Death" (生と死の狭間, "Sei to Shi no Hazama"); 217. "Magic Words" (魔法の言葉, "Mahō no Kotoba"); 218. "Fragments of Memories" (記憶の欠片, "Kioku no Kakera"); 219. "Inherited Magic" (継がれた魔法, "Tsugareta Mahō")
Kurogane and Fai battle Fei-Wang, allowing Syaoran to go rescue the original Sakura. When Syaoran rescues the original Sakura from Fei-Wang's curse, her soul merges with her clone's body, giving Fei-Wang the power to achieve his goal: he uses such power to revive Yūko who was frozen in time before her death by the Clow Reed, a powerful sorcerer who the original Syaoran descends from, and thus prove himself superior to him. With her new life, Yūko transports a glass to the Kingdom of Clow, which brings two other people identical to Syaoran and Sakura. The two start reversing the damage Fei-Wang caused to the worlds when he used the powers from the two Sakuras. As Fei-Wang wonders how they are able to use Clow Reed's magic, Yūko shows them how she reconstructed the two clones before as they could not die due to their nature.
28	Dimension Trap! Arata na Tabi ga Hajimaru! (新たな旅が始まる! lit. A new adventure begins!)	November 17, 2009; 978-4-06-384206-7	November 23, 2010; 978-0-345-52164-4
220. "The Strongest Magic" (最強の魔術, "Saikyō no Majutsu"); 221. "The Remaining Providence" (残された摂理, "Nokosareta Setsuri"); 222. "The Beginning of the Dream" (夢の始まり, "Yume no Hajimari"); 223. "A Time of Happiness" (幸福の時間, "Kōfuku no Jikan"); 224. "A Closed Loop" (閉じられた輪, "Tojirareta Wa"); 225. "The Power to Believe" (信じる力, "Shinjiru Chikara"); 226. "The Demon King and the Witch" (魔王と魔女, "Maō to Majo"); 227. "The Only Proof" (唯一の証, "Yuiitsu no Akashi"); 228. "Overlapping Emotions" (重なる思い, "Kasanaru Omoi"); 229. "Before Proceeding" (進むべき先, "Susumubeki Saki"); 230. "The Resurrected World" (甦る世界, "Yomigaeru Sekai"); 231. "The Rift Between Time and Space" (時空の狭間, "Jikū no Hazama); 232. "The World of Beginnings" (始まりの世界, "Hajimari no Sekai"); Special Chapter: "The World Returned To" (還る世界, "Kaeru Sekai")
In order to compensate the clones for the way they were used by Fei-Wang, Yūko uses her life and the magic that Clow Reed left as payments in order for the clones to be reborn as ordinary humans in another world. Years after reuniting, the clones have a son together, who is revealed to be the original Syaoran. In order to save their friends from Fei-Wang, the clones seal themselves in the glass in Yūko's shop. Following their unsealing, Fei-Wang realizes that Yūko is dead, and tries to use the originals Syaoran and Sakura to revive her, but is killed in the attempt. Before dying, Fei-Wang traps the original Syaoran in a void, dragging his clone and Watanuki. With their creator's death, both clones fade away leaving behind two feathers, while Syaoran and Watanuki escape from the void for a price: Syaoran must continue traveling through the dimensions forever, while Watanuki must forever stay in Yūko's shop. The group rests in the Kingdom of Clow where Fai, Kurogane, and Mokona decide to join Syaoran once again in hope of finding a way to bring back the clones with the two feathers. Before departing on their separate ways, Syaoran and Sakura confess their love for each other hoping to meet again.

=== Tsubasa: World Chronicle: Nirai Kanai-hen ===
No.	Title	Original release date	English release date
1	Bravely Facing the Darkness Together: (-)	February 15, 2015; 978-4-06-395326-8	December 15, 2015; 978-1632361240
001. "A New World" (新世界より); 002. "Lights and Flowers" (灯と花); 003. "The Encounter with the Goddess Princess" (姫神との対面); 004. "The Coexistence of the Living and the Dead" (生者と死者は共に); 005. "No Matter What Lies Ahead" (この先に何が待とうとも)
Watanuki gives Syaoran three different items that he needs to use in his journey. The travellers are in waiting in a village for the hunter Fuma to change Kurogane's mechanical arm. During a festival, Syaoran makes contact with a Goddess who claims she saw his other self in a dream. Having connected with Princess Sakura through a dream, the Goddess summons the travelers in order to request their help with the souls of the world with moving on to the afterlife from the island of Nirai Kanai. Syaoran agrees with the hope of making contact with his clone. Using one of Watanuki's items as payment, Syaoran, Kurogane, Fai and Mokona enter into the world of the dead.
2	Dual Worlds, Dual Sights: (-)	October 16, 2015; 978-4-06-395490-6	April 12, 2016; 978-1632361707
006. "The Visible World" (みえている世界); 007. "I Was Waiting for You" (貴方を待っていた); 008. "Power of God" (神の力); 009. "Waiting At The Utaki" (御嶽で待つ); 010. "So You Are..." (御嶽で待つ); 011. "The Items Watanuki Collected" (四月一日が集めてくれたもの)
Upon entering into the realm of the dead, Syaoran is greeted by a friendly person which Fai and Kurogane perceive as a corpse. Watanuki makes contact with Sakura, with both fearing they can no longer find Syaoran's group after their entrance into the world of the dead. Syaoran manages to contact his clone in a dream and is told that the clone is in the realm of Utaki. When a spirit turns against the group, Syaoran is wounded. He meets the guardian Kujaku who calls him the "Yuta" chosen by the Goddess to reach Utaki. Upon recovering, Syaoran uses Watanuki's items to reach Utaki.
3	A Choice Between Worlds: (-)	August 17, 2016; 978-4-06-395717-4	November 22, 2016; 978-1632362940
012. "Syaoran Summoned"; 013. "Reunion"; 014. "The Surface and the Interior"; 015. "The Impending Choice"; 016. "Syaoran's Answer"; 017. "Using All Your Strength"; 018. "The Conclusion"; 019. "Thank You"
In Utaki, the original Syaoran seeks to fight the clone in order to make him reincarnate alongside the undead from the world. However, since the Syaoran clone has been summoned as the original's opponent, it is impossible for him to obtain a new life. The clone forces the original Syaoran to fight him, and the clone's defeat returns the people from Nirai Kanai. When Syaoran awakes, the travellers have returned to Nirai Kanai and prepare to eat, when Fuma finally arrives with a replacement for Kurogane's arm.
