= List of RG Veda characters =

This article covers the major characters of Clamp's manga RG Veda and its respective anime adaptation. The story features elements of Vedic mythology and is named after the Rigveda.

== Characters ==
=== Ashura ===
Ashura (阿修羅)

- Voiced by: Kazue Ikura (Japanese); Rachael Lillis (CPM dub), Deborah Makepeace (Manga UK dub) (English)
The protagonist of the series and the last living member of the Ashura clan, Ashura was born after Taishakuten had killed his father and seized the throne. His mother, Shashi, at the same time gave birth to Taishakuten's son Ten-ō, and tried to kill Ashura, who she believed would stand in her way to rule Heaven at Taishakuten's side. However, Ashura's powers protected him and enclosed him in a cocoon where he slept undisturbed for three hundred years, until Yasha-ō awoke him.
Upon being freed from his cocoon, Ashura first appears as a baby, but grows rapidly to a child of maybe eight years. At first outgoing and friendly, he soon becomes aware of his cruel destiny, as Taishakuten has almost everyone with whom he has associated killed. Feeling guilty for their deaths, he vows to become strong enough to defeat Taishakuten himself.
However, Ashura has another side: He is, in fact, the "true Ashura", the merciless god of war whose wish is the total destruction of Heaven, Earth and Hell. This side was suppressed by several seals, one of which is the distribution of his true power among the Six Stars, but is freed upon their meeting. Only his love for Yasha-ō, his adoptive father, finally triumphs over his lust for destruction.
As a punishment for his father's sin, Ashura was born genderless so he cannot continue the royal line of Ashura, which Ashura-ō so desperately wished to preserve that he tried to defy destiny. Languages which do not have a gender-neutral pronoun usually refer to him by either the male or the female pronoun; the choice of either is often a source of much contention. He has appeared in both all-male and all-female CLAMP illustrations, and when animated, is generally voiced by slightly boyish sounding females to preserve the gender ambiguity.
Ashura is also a crossover character in another CLAMP manga, Tsubasa: Reservoir Chronicle, where he appears under the name Ashura-ō as the king of Shura Country, hosting Syaoran, Sakura and Mokona during their stay in this world. His clan is at constant war with the Yasha clan over possession of a mysterious castle in the sky, which is said to fulfill its master's wish. It turns out that he was in love with Yasha-ō, who returned his feelings, and wished to resurrect him from the dead. He dies as the castle, unable to fulfill this impossible wish, crashes down around him.

=== The Six Stars ===
Yasha-ō (夜叉王, Yasha-Ō)

- Voiced by: Show Hayami (Japanese); Scottie Ray (CPM dub), Linus Roache (Manga UK dub) (English)
Head of the Yasha clan and one of the strongest warriors in Tenkai, Yasha-ō serves as the bushinshō of the north. Wanting to fulfil the prophecy of his friend Kuy-ō the stargazer, he woke Ashura and became his protector even though she had also predicted that Ashura would kill him and knowing that this act of rebellion would anger Taishakuten. As a result of his not giving Ashura over to Taishakuten, his entire clan was declared renegade and slaughtered by Bishamonten.
When Yasha-ō was still a child, Ashura-ō (knowing that Yasha was the one who would awaken Ashura) asked him what he would do if the most important person in the world to him was fated to bring him disaster. Yasha replied that he would "protect him". Ashura-ō then told him to become strong so in future he will be able to protect the person that he treasures above all others. His real name is Yama, having taken the name of Yasha-ō when he became the leader of his tribe. He has a younger brother named Rasetsu who was later killed by Koumoku-ten.
Another incarnation of Yasha-ō also appears in Tsubasa: Reservoir Chronicle as the king of the Yama clan who war with the Shura clan. He fell in love with King Ashura but was killed by a deadly disease. One of Sakura's feathers resurrected him until Ashura found the courage to return it to her.

Ryū-ō (龍王, Ryū-Ō)

- Voiced by: Kappei Yamaguchi (Japanese); Ted Lewis (English)
The young king of the dragon tribe of the west, Ryū-ō reluctantly inherited the throne since his grandfather was too sick to continue ruling. He joined Yasha-ō, Ashura, and Sōma after they accidentally ended up in his kingdom, in the hopes of getting a chance to fight against Yasha-ō, the strongest warrior in Heaven. Ryū-ō wields the Ryū clan's king's sword Ryūga-tō (Dragon Fang sword) that controls water and can smash rocks despite being entirely blunt. When revealed to be one of the Six Stars, he decides to stick with the others despite the risk to his clan, even though he is the only one not holding a personal grudge against Taishaku-ten. He is killed by the true Ashura right after the latter awakens. His real name is Naga, having taken on the name of Ryū-ō when he became the leader of his tribe.
In Tsubasa: Reservoir Chronicle, two alternate versions of Ryū-ō appear: as an Oni hunter partnering Sōma in the world of Outo and also as a racer in Piffle World. In the anime, he becomes good friends with the main character Syaoran in both versions.

Kendappa-ō (乾闥婆王, Kendappa-Ō)

- Voiced by: Arisa Andō (Japanese); Rebecca Wesley (English)
Queen of the Kendappa tribe in the east, Kendappa-ō is the royal musician. Despite her favoured position at Taishaku-ten's court, she hid Sōma in her flying castle after her tribe was wiped out and also helped Yasha-ō and Ashura when they passed through her kingdom. However, she does not believe that the Six Stars can triumph over Taishaku-ten, who she says is the strongest person in Heaven. Instead of allying herself with her friends, she reveals herself to be one of Taishakuten's shitennō, Jikokuten, the shitennō and bushinshō of the East – a position her father had held before being killed by Taishaku-ten. Impressed with Taishakuten's strength, the only trait which she admires, she swore herself to his service when she was just a small child. Her harp, her constant companion, serves also as the hiding place for her sword. Unable to go back on her word, believing that all of the Six Stars will be killed anyway, she decides to kill Sōma, whom she is in love with, herself. She commits suicide right after, saying there is no point in living in Heaven without her.
An alternate version of Kendappa-ō appears in Tsubasa: Reservoir Chronicle, where she is the Empress of Japan and older sister of Princess Tomoyo.

Karura-ō (迦楼羅王, Karura-Ō)

- Voiced by: Yoshiko Sakakibara (Japanese); Mary Anne Towne (English)
Queen of the Karura tribe, she has supported Yasha's mission from the beginning but was unable to join him because she wanted to stay with her weak younger sister until she died. But when Taishakuten kidnapped Karyoubinga and made her sing till she died, Karura vowed revenge and joined Yasha in his quest to take down Taishakuten. She is one of the Six Stars. She uses her bird, Garuda, and her magic to fight. She is killed by Taishakuten in a one-on-one fight. She dies sorry that she couldn't avenge her sister's murder but is glad to go be with her again.
She briefly appears in the CLAMP manga Tsubasa: Reservoir Chronicle as a racer in Piffle world.

Sōma (蘇摩, Sōma)

- Voiced by: Yuriko Yamamoto (Japanese); Carolee Goodgold (English)
Sole remaining member of the Sōma tribe, she watched her entire tribe massacred right in front of her. She was found by Kendappa-ō, who hid her with Kisshōten. She joins Yasha to avenge her tribe. She is one of the Six Stars. Her weapons are her twin moon blades that she throws with deadly accuracy. She is killed by Kendappa-ō stabbing her in the chest with her sword. Kendappa-ō then slits her own throat to go with her. Sōma tries to revive her with her blood, which can give immortality to one person, but is stopped by Taishakuten.
She is a crossover character in the CLAMP manga Tsubasa: Reservoir Chronicle. She is the guard for Princess Tomoyo and is a ninja with Kurogane. She is also with Ryū in Outo world as an Oni hunter.

=== The Imperial Family ===
Taishakuten (帝釈天)

- Voiced by: Norio Wakamoto (Japanese); Crispin Freeman (English)
Taishakuten is the villain of RG Veda. In Vedic mythology and religion, Taishakuten is a prominent deity known in Sanskrit as Indra, or Śakra, from the earlier Proto-Indo-Iranian religion via Proto-Indo-Iranian *Índras.
A strong-minded man and a fearsome warrior who gained the title of "thunder god", he is in love with Ashura-ō and "will do anything to get what I want". Therefore, Taishakuten made a deal with Ashura-ō: he could have the Ashura king, but had to fulfill his wish of preventing Ashura's son from becoming a God of Destruction. This leads to the painful act of him eating Ashura-ō later, as Ashura-ō said this is the only way for him to have strength to rebel against the Emperor. Taishakuten then successfully killed the Emperor and got the title himself, becoming a tyrant just to fulfill one wish of the man he loved. According to Taishakuten, living alone without your loved one is extremely painful, as he had always suffered being without Ashura-ō.

Shashi (舎脂)

- Voiced by: Toshiko Fujita (Japanese); Suzy Prue (English)
Shashi is a human being and twin sister of Kaara. Along with Kaara, she is allowed to live with the Gods and share their power as they are mikos. Unlike the other one, Shashi is smart yet wicked and has ambition to be the Empress. Though married to Ashura-ō, she committed adultery with Taishakuten and helped him slaughter the Ashura clan, her own clan, as she knew it "just like her face". When Taishakuten got the title of Emperor, she became the Empress. It is later revealed that Taishakuten wanted her close to keep a watch on the sword Shurato, of which she has a seal on her forehead. She gave birth to the twin Tenou and Ashura, which she killed off the later because he's of Ashura's bloodline. She denied her own son Ashura till the very end, which led to Ashura killing her in his rage becoming the God of Destruction.

Kaara (迦羅)

Twin sister of Shashi. Unlike her sister, Kaara is very gentle and has a kind heart. When the great war happened, she was found lying by Kumara, Lord of the beautiful capital Kusumabaura, which had just been destroyed by Taishakuten's army. Therefore he kept the sword Shurato at the crumble city in order to lure Ashura, for he believed that the city could prosper again if Ashura dies. Kaara is in love with him, but since she's already dead she couldn't bear him a child. She truly died together with Kumara after releasing the seal for her "young master".

Tenou (天王, Tennō)

- Voiced by: Kōji Tsujitani (Japanese); Jeffery Gimble (English)
Tenou is son of Shashi and Taishakuten; therefore he is the "Crown Prince". Quite handsome, strong and has a kind heart, Tenou is different from both his mother and father. He loves the maestro Kendappa-ō deeply without realizing that she is the last warrior general of his Emperor father. His love is unrequited because Kendappa-ō loved Sōma already, but he only found out about this at the end of the manga, when she revealed her true nature. When Ashura awoke as a God of Destruction, he somehow didn't kill Tenou, stating that he wants Tenou to witness all the terrible carnage he would do.

=== Ashura-ō ===
Ashura-ō (阿修羅王, Ashura-Ō)

Ashura-ō is first introduced as the god of war and guardian of Heaven under the former Emperor, who died defending his lord against Taishakuten and is revered as a hero. However, it turns out at the end of the manga that he had, in fact, engineered Taishakuten's rebellion himself: Knowing through Kuy-oh's prophecy and his own visions of his future son's true nature as the "true Ashura", he nonetheless wished for his son to be born. To change destiny and prevent Ashura's awakening, he asked for Taishakuten's help, which Taishakuten promised in return for his body. Ashura-ō married Shashi so she, one of the priestesses bearing one of Ashura's seals on her forehead, would be his mother, whom Ashura presumably would not wish to kill. He had Taishakuten seize the throne and rule cruelly, to prevent the Six Stars from gathering. As a last safeguard, should Ashura still awaken, he asked Taishakuten to kill him and eat his body, so he might become strong enough to kill Ashura.
In Tsubasa: Reservoir Chronicle, Ashura-ō is the king of the cold world of Celes. At the beginning of the manga, he is sealed in a magical sleep by Fai D. Flourite, who then proceeds to flee from him through different worlds. It is later revealed that he collected Fai from imprisonment in another world and raised him. However, the Ashuras' nature in RG Veda is mirrored in Tsubasa: Ashura-ō, too, has another side, and regularly goes on killing sprees among his subjects. He took Fai in to draw his curse to kill everyone stronger than him upon himself, however, Fai's curses were both activated (the first due to Sakura, and the second after Ashura-ō's death). Ashura-ō was stabbed by Kurogane and died in Fai's arms.

=== Other characters ===
Kujaku (孔雀)

- Voiced by: Yasunori Matsumoto (Japanese); Hans Brikfeice (English)
Kujaku first appears as a mysterious traveler that Ashura finds near the Yasha village after he falls out of a tree (supposedly from hunger). He comes and go at random but he almost always assists Yasha and Ashura's group usually in the form of information, magical aid, or light babysitting. His powers range from the highly destructive to the prophetic. But as his motives are unclear most of the six stars do not trust him. Yasha suffers him to stick around mostly because Ashura likes him a great deal; a sentiment Kujaku genuinely reciprocates. But because of his odd traits and purple eyes, he is accused of being a mazoku (a demon). In actuality, Kujaku the son of the former emperor and his younger sister Sonsei-ō, who was also the head stargazer/priestess before Kuyou. This would imply that he and Kisshouten are half-siblings. As a child he manifested a daten (a third eye placed vertically in the center of the forehead) and a pair of black feathered wings as marks of the fact his parents committed the sin of incest. It is revealed near the end of the final battle that Kujaku has used his powers to attempt to change fate: He forged a sword which is connected to Shura-tō and so allows a measure of control over Ashura, Yama-tō, which he gave to the Yasha clan so it would pass down to Yasha. He explains that initially he did it out of curiosity, to see if fate could be changed; and then later was motivated by his affection for Ashura as they were both "unneeded children". Kujaku dies in the final pages of the manga after sacrificing himself to free Ashura from his sleep.

An incarnation of Kujaku appears in the sequel series of Tsubasa: Reservoir Chronicle as a ferryman for the "space between" the two halves of the world of Nirai Kanai'. This name is told to be an alias though, for entertainment purposes.

Karyoubinga (迦陵頻伽, Karyōbinga)

Karyoubinga is the much younger sister of Karura-ō. She has a beautiful singing voice and is devoted to her older sister's happiness. However, she was born with a very weak body and is prone to fevers and other illness and so she must stay in the thinner air of the floating city of the Karura tribe to survive. Like her sister and Garuda, Karyou also has a bird familiar, in the form of a small song bird. Unfortunately, rumors of her excellent voice reach Taishakuten and he has her kidnapped to get her to sing for him (it is arguable he actually does this to control/incense Karura-ō). She is forced to perform a concert with Kendappa-Oh in front of the assembled court and sings herself to death in the thicker atmosphere for the sake of her sister. Her body is later fed to Taishakuten's pets. She is last seen collecting Karura-ō's soul after she is killed by Taishakuten.

Kuyou (九曜, Kuyō)

- Voiced by: Mika Doi (Japanese); Suzy Prue (English)
Kuyou is the blind stargazer/head priestess of Heaven during the reign of the previous emperor. She was in love with Ashura-ō and told him the original prophecy about his son's fate. After Taishakuten takes over, she is imprisoned because she refuses to serve him. At the beginning of the manga, she has managed to flee and hides in her old temple, where Yasha finds her. As Ashura-ō had requested of her, she tells him the prophecy. This causes him to leave in search of Ashura. While he is gone, Bishamonten finds her and kills her by impaling her to the temple wall with her staff.

Hanranya (般羅若)

Hanranya is the younger sister of Kuyou and performs in her place for Taishakuten after Kuyou escapes. Unlike her sister who was blind and a stargazer from birth, Hanranya attained her powers by blinding herself with a torch. Thus she is not as powerful as Kuyou and can only scry in water. She primarily uses her powers to help Taishakuten track and hound the six stars but toward the end of the last battler her she uses her water mirror to communicate with Kujaku and is able to look into the past to reveal his origins. She is both loyal and strongly devoted to Taishakuten and attempts to kill herself when she believes he has died during the final fight with Ashura. She is prevented by Souchouten and eventually ends up in the retinue of Ten-ō, assumably serving him in the same manner she served his father.

Bishamonten (毘沙門天)

- Voiced by: Kenyū Horiuchi (Japanese); Eric Stuart (English)
Bishamonten is the most powerful of Taishakuten's four generals. He began as a talented but low ranked officer in the service of the previous emperor but chose to side with Taishakuten in return for being given Kisshouten as his wife; with whom he is deeply in love. In a flashback, Taishakuten warns his ally that this plan will probably result in Kisshouten hating him but Bishamonten replies that he doesn't care because all he wants is to keep Kisshouten near him and he doesn't see any other way it would be possible. He chooses to never tell Kisshouten that all he had done, he has done so he can be near her. Bishamonten is eventually killed by Yasha in the final battle; an event that precipitates the discovery that Kisshouten was equally in love with him, despite everything he had done.

Kisshouten (吉祥天, Kisshōten)

Kisshouten is the wife of Bishamonten and daughter of the previous emperor and an unnamed, unseen mother. Despite that Bishamonten wins her by conquest, she is legitimately in love with him and has apparently been so from even before he betrayed her father for Taishakuten. She is kind and gentle as well as moderately powerful, being able to command a modicum of magic to scry in a large mirror in her palace. She has also housed Sōma as a servant for many years as a favor for Kendappa-ō. She has no love for Taishakuten and so assists the six stars whenever she has the opportunity. Taishakuten does not like her either, but allows her to live as long as Bishamonten serves him. When Bishamonten dies, Kisshouten runs to his side and Taishakuten mocks her for her ignorance of her husband's devotion and her knowledge of her father's sins before cutting her down. She bleeds to death beside Bishamonten's body.

Tentei (先帝)

The previous emperor is never referred to by any specific name. The story begins with him being defeated and beheaded by Taishakuten. We do not know much about him other than he appeared to be well liked by his people and ruled wisely. Taishakuten, Ashura-ō, and many of the parents of the six stars served under the previous emperor as his soldiers and bodyguards. However, through flashbacks it is shown that he had an incestuous relationship with his younger sister, Sonsei-ō. When she gave birth to their child Kujaku he had them both locked up in a cave to hide his sin. Ashura-ō, and through him Taishakuten, appear to be the only other characters that discovered this information before Kujaku reveals it at the end.

Sonseiō (尊星王)

Sonsei-ō is the younger sister of the previous emperor and the mother of Kujaku. She is only seen in a handful of flashbacks but it is revealed that she was the head priestess/stargazer before Kuyou and so any of her children would inherit her power. She was in an incestuous relationship with her brother, and when Kujaku was born, he regarded the child as proof of his sin and had them both locked up. During that time Sonsei-ō went insane and attempted to kill her son by strangling him. She declared that he is an unneeded child and if it were not for him everything would be all right. Kujaku, wishing to save his mother, resigns himself to die but in a moment of clarity she cannot go through with it. She kills herself instead by stabbing herself through the chest with her staff.

Kumaraten (倶摩羅天)

Zōchōten (増長天)

- Voiced by: Yūsaku Yara (Japanese); Tristan Goddard (English)

Kōmokuten (広目天)

- Voiced by: Tesshō Genda

Rasetsu (羅刹)

Rasetsu is the younger brother of Yasha-o. He was the son of the previous Yasha-o and his wife (who died when Rasetsu was very young and appears in the flashbacks of Yama's mother) while Yama (current Yasha-o) was the son of the previous Yasha-o and another woman who was not married to him. Despite all this, Rasetsu seeks for his older brother's love and attention. He greatly idolizes Yama for his skills and power. When it is time to choose the new Yasha-o, Yama volunteers Rasetsu for the title, thinking that only the legitimate son should have the title. Later that night, Rasetsu took on a journey and leave the throne to Yama. Yama's mother was the first one to get pregnant despite that she's not the real wife of the previous Yasha-o. but despite all of this, the mother of Yama and the mother of Rasetsu get along very well that when Yama's mother was pregnant with him, Rasetsu's mother was the one who took great care for her. He died while trying to block the way of Koumokuten; Koumukuten killed him. He is the husband of Shara.

Shara (沙羅)

She is beautiful wife of Rasetsu. She tries to protect Ashura and the group by killing herself. Koumokutan later used her blood to find Ashura and the others.

Gigei (技藝)

Gigei was a dancer who greatly loves Yasha-o and is fond of little Ashura. She was killed while performing in Kisshouten's castle because she was trying to protect Ashura.

Aizen Myō-ō (愛染明王)

- Voiced by: Satomi Kōrogi (Japanese); Veronica Taylor (English)
