= List of Tsubasa: Reservoir Chronicle characters =

Promotional illustration featuring (from left to right) Fai, Sakura, Syaoran and Kurogane

The Tsubasa: Reservoir Chronicle manga series and its respective animated adaptations feature a large cast of fictional characters designed by Clamp. The series takes place in a fictional multiverse with parallel dimensions where several characters – taken from many of Clamp's past works – can appear in several of the universes as having the same character names and designs but differing histories and settings.

The story begins in the desert Kingdom of Clow where Syaoran, a devoted and kind archeologist, investigates its ruins. His childhood friend Sakura, the kind and well-loved princess of the kingdom who holds an undeveloped magic, mysteriously has her memories scattered across the dimensions in the form of feathers and will die if they are not returned to her. To save her, Syaoran takes her to the Dimensional Witch Yūko Ichihara where he meets two more of the series' protagonists who have arrived with similar wishes: Kurogane, a rough-mannered ninja, and Fai D. Flowright, a laid-back magician with a dark past. In order to journey across the dimensions, they receive a cheerful creature named Mokona Modoki, the fifth of the group, from Yūko. On their journey across the dimensions, the group decide to join Syaoran to retrieve Sakura's feathers, as a mean to accomplish their wishes. The protagonists are all linked by the series' main antagonist, the sorcerer Fei-Wang Reed who oversees the journey.

Using Osamu Tezuka's Star System, Clamp designed the series' characters based on the ones they used in their previous works. Few of the characters appearing in Tsubasa: Reservoir Chronicle are the exact ones from other series, most notably the ones from xxxHolic, series which often crossovers Tsubasa. The characters from Tsubasa: Reservoir Chronicle have received positive critical response by critics due to their traits, and development across the series. Various types of merchandising have also been released based on them.

== Creation and conception ==
Using the ideas of Osamu Tezuka and his Star System, the series contains various crossover characters from many of Clamp's series, including most notably Cardcaptor Sakura, RG Veda, X and xxxHolic from which the main characters are derived. The series' characters were designed by Clamp writer Mokona, while Syaoran and Sakura were chosen as its protagonists because Clamp wanted to use ones whose original series had happy ending. However, in contrast to Syaoran Li and Sakura Kinomoto from Cardcaptor Sakura, Clamp pointed out that they would have to go throughout the series to get their "own happy ending". Nanase Ohkawa explained that while some characters appearing in Tsubasa are the same ones from other of their works, their traits and personalities were modified due to different backstories. Clamp found drawing old characters again interesting. They were careful not to make mistakes since there were some of them they barely remembered how to illustrate. The team also decided not to draw inferior eyelashes which resulted in notable changes in the faces. Little accessories were given to the characters in order to avoid unnecessary details and thus facilitate an easier transition to anime.

As Tsubasa is connected with xxxHolic, the characters' designs are also meant to be similar. Like xxxHolic, the artwork is sometimes influenced by Ukiyo-e art style which leads to the characters have longer limbs. Another similarity between both the series is the use of one-eyed characters or people who lost their sight, which is meant to express the feelings from them. The characters of Fai D. Flowright and Kurogane were created in order to have adult characters who would side with Syaoran, who was much younger and was still in development during the series' start. As a result of the manga being aimed at young male demographic, characters are designed to appeal of them such as Syaoran who appears as an action hero. In order to make fights more entertaining Clamp decided to include yells of fighting techniques for the first time in a manga of them. Although Kurogane was the only character who did this at first, the authors also planned to make Syaoran do this.

A common trope Clamp uses in their works involve two characters being identical with the most notorious case in Tsubasa being the two Syaorans. Clamp aimed to make both of them equally different based on their actions despite being virtually identical. Clamp also aimed to create another link between Syaoran, Sakura and Kimihiro Watanuki, the protagonist of xxxHolic. Nanase Ohkawa referred to both clones appearing in the series with the term "utsushimi" (写身) to make them look like a departure from the original English word that fans often mention, aiming for different take of the cloning.

=== Casting ===
The two characters who share the name of Syaoran are voiced by Miyu Irino Irino said that ever since the introduction of the original Syaoran—who he also voiced—he sometimes had problems voicing both characters. Fellow voice actress Yui Makino also discussed Irino's role, saying that he was the most difficult character to cast because of the requirement to portray the two Syaorans. Irino said that he grew attached to the role since he played the role of Syaoran for several years starting doing the television series when he was in high school and that he was in college by the original video animations. Still, he was interested by the fact that the two characters he was voicing, Syaorans, were also fighting each other. Sakura was Makino's first work in her work as an actress. Makino states she did not have to adjust her voice for that, finding the character similar to her. During the series' OVAs, Makino mentioned that one of Sakura's scenes was very sad, and worked to make it appealing. Kurogane is voiced in Japanese by Tetsu Inada who took a liking to the character. Fai was voiced by Daisuke Namikawa. Namikawa stated that, from his point of view, Fai was hard to understand but there were signs in the manga that he suffered too much in his childhood. As the anime series did not focus on him, Nanikawa looked forward to explore Fai's background in the original video animations following the Tokyo Revelations trilogy. However, as the staff skipped the Celes arc and instead moved to Japan's, Namikawa expressed disappointment for not being able to portray the scenes of Fai. Nevertheless, Namikawa expected satisfaction with the way he worked for the series.

In English, Sakura was voiced by Monica Rial. She enjoyed the series due to how cheerful are most of the cast and their visual appeal regardless of drama. Kurogane is voiced by Christopher Sabat. Sabat compared Kurogane's characterization with One Piece's Roronoa Zoro and YuYu Hakusho's Kazuma Kuwabara, describing them as "the tough guy with a heart of gold". As a result, Sabat feared that he sometimes performs similar voices despite the fact the characters are different. He also tried seeing the original actors' works, in order to avoid to get a more specific delivery. English Voice actor Vic Mignogna referred to Fai alongside Qrow from RWBY as one of his favorite characters based on their calm personalities in contrast to other works he has done involving characters who have a tendency to scream. As a result, he views Fai and Qrow as characters he can perform easily for a long determined time.

== Protagonists ==
=== Syaoran ===
Voiced by: Miyu Irino (Japanese); Jason Liebrecht (English, Funimation dub), Darren Pleavin (English, Animax Asia dub)

Syaoran (小狼, Shaoran) is a resident of the Kingdom of Clow. He is the adopted son of the late archeologist Fujitaka, who he started continuing his work while living alone after Fujitaka died. After Sakura's memories are scattered, he makes it his goal to find them, despite knowing that she will never remember him as part of a payment to Yūko Ichihara to obtain the white Mokona Modoki creature. Nevertheless, throughout the journey he starts bonding with Sakura again as well as with his companions Fai D. Flowright, Kurogane and Mokona.

=== Sakura ===
Voiced by: Yui Makino (Japanese); Monica Rial (English, Funimation dub)

Sakura (サクラ) is the princess of the Kingdom of Clow, who befriended and fell in love with Syaoran during her girlhood. A powerful force strips her of her memories and magical abilities, which take the form of feathers. All the feathers are spread throughout different parallel worlds. To retrieve the feathers and thereby save her life, she and Syaoran are sent to Yūko, who gives them Mokona in exchange for Sakura's memories of Syaoran, which causes him to be absent from any memories restored to her. She is initially confused, and constantly tired, but she grows stronger as she regains her feathers. She is very friendly and she grows close to Syaoran once again. She is voiced by Yui Makino in the anime adaptation, and by Monica Rial in the English adaptation.

=== Kurogane ===
Voiced by: Tetsu Inada (Japanese); Christopher Sabat (English, Funimation dub), Dave Bridges (English, Animax Asia dub)

Kurogane (黒鋼) is a rough-mannered ninja from the world of Japan, who is sent away from his world by Princess Tomoyo in order to have him discover his true strength. He is the most powerful warrior in his world, but he shows no mercy to anyone, so Tomoyo places a "curse" on him that will decrease his strength if he kills anyone. He gives up his replica of the sword, Ginryū (銀竜; lit. 'Silver Dragon'), as the price to use Mokona to cross dimensions and return to his home world. He quickly bonds with the group, to the point he starts tutoring Syaoran. He is constantly teased by Fai, who calls him a variety of nicknames, though he also is able to tell Fai's true nature. However blunt and crude Kurogane may act, he is actually quite observant and perceptive, being always acutely aware of his surroundings.

=== Fai D. Flowright ===
Voiced by: Daisuke Namikawa (Japanese); Vic Mignogna (English, Funimation dub), Candice Moore (English, Animax Asia dub)

Fai D. Flowright (ファイ・D・フローライト, Fai D. Furōraito; also known as Fay D. Flourite in the Japanese version) is a powerful magician from the country of Celes. He travels to Yūko on his own accord after sealing his king Ashura-ō and having his creation, Chī, alert him if Ashura awakens. He wishes never to return to his country, so he gives up a tattoo on his back in exchange for Mokona to travel through dimensions. Having lost his tattoo, Fai decides not to use magic anymore and relies on weapons to battle. Fai appears to be cheerful and good-natured, and acts very carefree. He often teases Kurogane, who questions this nature, sensing that it is just a false persona to hide that he is emotionally distant. Fai does not bother to fight hard for his life, and will only do so if someone he cares for is in danger, which Kurogane notes to be Syaoran and Sakura, as he uses magic to help them.

=== Mokona Modoki ===
Voiced by: Mika Kikuchi (Japanese); Carrie Savage (English, Funimation dub), Sarah Hauser (English, Animax Asia dub)

Mokona Modoki (モコナ = モドキ) refers to two rabbit-like creatures created by Yūko Ichihara and Clow Reed in preparation for the events in Tsubasa: Reservoir Chronicle and xxxHolic. The white Mokona travels with Syaoran's group, while the black Mokona stays in Yūko's shop. Both are based upon the original Mokona, whom Yūko and Clow encountered while Mokona was traveling through different worlds. They were created as Clamp found mascots were popular in young demographics following the popularity of Kero from Cardcaptor Sakura.

The white Mokona, whose real name is Soel (ソエル, Soeru), is given to Syaoran's group by Yūko in exchange for their most-valued possessions. Mokona is responsible for locating Sakura's feathers, and whenever one is around, she yells "mekkyo", which alerts the others. Mokona is a very cheerful, optimistic and energetic being, and likes to tease Kurogane, who occasionally uses violence to get back at her. Mokona has many abilities, including traveling to different worlds, teleporting objects from one world to another, sensing strong auras, and allowing people from other worlds to communicate. With the help of the black Mokona, the white Mokona is able to stay in contact with Yūko. Mokona also possesses a blue gem which she uses after series' end to alert the original Syaoran when he is unable to stay in a single dimension. Mokona joins him, Fai and Kurogane for the original Syaoran's never ending journey, making also appearances in xxxHolic and Kobato. Although the Mokonas appear genderless, it is suggested in the drama CDs that Soel is female, and the black Mokona, Larg (ラーグ, Rāgu), is male. The Mokonas are voiced by Mika Kikuchi in Japanese and Carrie Savage in the English version.

=== Tsubasa (Syaoran) ===
Voiced by: Miyu Irino (Japanese); Jason Liebrecht (English, Funimation dub), Darren Pleavin (English, Animax Asia dub)

Tsubasa (ツバサ), usually called Syaoran (小狼, Shaoran; also officially written as 『小狼』), is a teenager who was used by sorcerer Fei-Wang Reed to create the Syaoran clone. As a descendant from the sorcerer Clow Reed, Syaoran was able to seal part of his "heart" within his clone, meant to be manipulated by Fei-Wang, allowing the clone to grow a personality. Despite being imprisoned and sealed in slumber by Fei-Wang in his first appearances, Syaoran is sometimes able control his clone's body to assist him in his journey. Once Syaoran escapes from the prison and his clone betrays his friends, he joins the group of Kurogane, Fai, Mokona and Sakura as he wishes to recover something he lost, later revealing he wished to find the original Sakura. Despite feeling guilty for his clone's betrayal to the group, Syaoran befriends them as they do not find him responsible for it. He is a skilled fighter, having observed all of his clone's actions. He is also a powerful magician descendant of the famous Clow Reed and is able to perform elemental spell alongside a jian sword which he keeps merged within his body.

== Antagonists ==
=== Fei-Wang Reed ===
Voiced by: Kazuhiro Nakata (Japanese); Randy Tallman (English, Funimation dub; first voice (first season)), R. Bruce Elliott (English, Funimation dub; second voice (second season, OVAs))

Fei-Wang Reed (飛王・リード, Feiwan Rīdo; Also romanized as "Fei Wong Reed") is a powerful magician who is after Sakura's inner powers. Therefore, he scatters her soul into multiple feathers throughout various worlds to make it get stronger as Syaoran is able to return them to her. In order to ensure Syaoran's success, he tried to make Fai D. Flowright and Kurogane his allies to assist Syaoran, but is only successful with the former. He is later revealed to be the creator of the clones of Syaoran and Sakura, having created them as backups if the originals were killed, and manages to turn the Syaoran clone into his own subordinate. He is stated to be a direct descendant of the powerful sorcerer Clow Reed by the witch Yūko Ichihara who opposes him, and is later suggested to be the remains of a very powerful wish made by Clow Reed. Though he already possesses the power to cross dimensions to transport Syaoran to different worlds like Sakura, he seeks to increase the power of Sakura to revive Yūko who was kept on the brink of death and her time being frozen by Clow, and thus claim himself Clow's superior. He is ruthless in pursuing this dream and does not care how much blood has to be shed to get his wish come true.

Fei-Wang is located in an area cut off from time in the ruins of the Kingdom of Clow created by the original Syaoran when he wished to turn back time after he placed a death seal on the original Sakura. As a result of this wish, Fei-Wang took the original Syaoran and Sakura prisoner to set up his plan. When the original Syaoran manages to rescue the original Sakura from the death seal, Fei-Wang obtains the powers from the two Sakuras to revive Yūko, breaking a logic that starts causing all the worlds to be destroyed. This leads to a battle against two Syaorans, the two Sakuras, Fai and Kurogane, in which the clones manage to undo Fei-Wang's damage to the world. In the course of the battle, Fei-Wang is mortally wounded by Kurogane, and his body starts disintegrating leading to the belief he was created by a powerful magician. However, before disappearing, he traps the two Syaorans and Watanuki in a void, while stating he wanted to tell Yūko something.

=== Xing Huo ===
Voiced by: Sanae Kobayashi (Japanese); Laura Bailey (English, Funimation dub)

Xing Huo (星火, Shin Fo) is Fei-Wang Reed's assistant who commonly appears alongside him discussing his plans. Not much about her is known besides the fact she is a "failed creation" of his. While in the manga she keeps interested in seeing the original Syaoran imprisoned, in the anime adaptation she acts as an agent from Fei-Wang during the last episodes. When the original Syaoran is freed from Fei-Wang's prison, Xing Huo betrays Fei-Wang, as she transports him go to Yūko's shop with him being unable to use such type of magic. A connection between her and Clow Reed is implied, with Yūko stating her motives were the same as his, and besides is able to use his magic. She is killed by Fei-Wang shortly afterward, who considers the betrayal as inevitable due to her origins.

=== Kyle Rondart ===
Voiced by: Mitsuru Miyamoto (Japanese); Troy Baker (English, Funimation dub)

An agent of Fei Wang Reed, Kyle Rondart (カイル = ロンダート, Kairu Rondāto; Romanized in Japanese as "Kyle Rondato") is first introduced in Jade Country as a doctor who was helping the village with their problems around the time the children started vanishing. Despite appearing to be a kind person, it is then revealed that out that through hypnotism he was the one that sends the children to the old castle to dig out Sakura's feather. Due to interference from Syaoran's group, Kyle loses the feather, and disappears with the destruction from Princess Emerald's castle. He reappears various times throughout the series, following Syaoran's group until kidnapping the Sakura's soulless body and taking it to Fei-Wang. When the original Syaoran's group manages to get to Fei-Wang and get their chance to kill him, it is revealed that Fei-Wang had used Kyle as a body double to save himself from being killed. Following his death, his body disappears as Fei-Wang comments he was an artificial being.

== Recurring characters ==
=== Yuko Ichihara ===
Voiced by: Sayaka Ohara (Japanese); Colleen Clinkenbeard (English, Funimation dub)

Yuko Ichihara (壱原 侑子, Ichihara Yūko), also known as the Dimensional Witch or the Space-Time Witch, is a witch who resides in a shop in modern-day Japan. In her shop, she can grant people their wishes if they can pay the equivalent price. Although Yūko is extremely powerful, to the point of being able to create gods, she cannot act without the request of another beforehand, regardless of whether the events she wishes to pass are selfless or not. She works against the sorcerer Fei-Wang Reed, knowing his purposes and helping Syaoran's group in their journey only when they pay a price. Before the series' start, Yūko met the sorcerer Clow Reed and both created the two Mokona Modoki in anticipation for the series' events. Near the series' ending, Yūko is revealed to have had her own time stopped by the late Clow Reed to prevent her death. Fei-Wang manages to obtain the power to achieve his goal of reviving Yūko. Just then, Yūko rebuilds the destroyed bodies from the Syaoran and Sakura clones in order to give them the choice to be reborn as normal humans. For this purpose, she gives her life for Sakura's payment with Clow having done the same for Syaoran's. As they are reborn in the past, Yūko is revealed to have died.

=== Kimihiro Watanuki ===
Voiced by: Jun Fukuyama (Japanese); Todd Haberkorn (English, Funimation dub)

Kimihiro Watanuki (四月一日 君尋, Watanuki Kimihiro) is Yūko Ichihara's employee who is the protagonist of xxxHolic. While he does not interact with the protagonists in his first appearances, when he appears in the Dream World, he meets Sakura who finds him similar to the original Syaoran. The original Syaoran acknowledges such fact, but Watanuki does not know its meaning as he once paid all of his memories to Yūko as a price to locate Fei-Wang who had imprisoned the original Syaoran. Watanuki and the original Syaoran were originally the same being, Watanuki being created when Syaoran paid the price for turning back time. A dimensional rift being created because of this, Watanuki was then born to Syaoran's parents instead of him, while he was taken hostage by Fei-Wang, until his payment for the wish was fulfilled. As Fei-Wang dies, Watanuki is trapped into a void alongside the two Syaorans due to Fei-Wang's curse. Following the clone's death, Watanuki and Syaoran divide a payment to escape from the void; Watanuki decides his payment is the "time in him", meaning he will never age. After that, he decides to succeed Yuuko's job in the shop, waiting for the day she might return.

=== Seishirō ===
Seishirō (星史郎) is a traveler who gained the power to travel between worlds from Yūko in exchange for his right eye. He searches for the vampire twins Kamui and Subaru and, like his younger brother Fūma, he is a treasure hunter. Although the reason for searching the vampire twins remains unknown, Kamui states that he will kill Seishirō if he finds them. Seishirō possesses one of Sakura's feathers which allows him to summon Oni to fight for him as well as modify them into swords he can change their shape. An experienced fighter, Seishirō was also the one to teach Syaoran his kicking techniques. Although he grows happy with his development, Seishirō does not doubt in trying to kill Syaoran in Oto Country when searching for clues about the vampires. When coming to Japan to get information about the vampires' location, Seishirō is challenged by the original Syaoran who wishes to obtain his feather. In the course of the battle Syaoran manages to claim the feather, although Fūma comments that was his main intention from the start. Seishirō later leaves Japan to continue his search, and is seen in the series' finale alongside the vampires and Fūma. Seishirō is a crossover character from Tokyo Babylon and X, Seishirō Sakurazuka. Seishirō is voiced by Hiroki Touchi in Japanese and J. Michael Tatum in English.

=== Fūma ===
Fūma (封真) is Seishirō's younger brother, who is also a treasure hunter and the leader of the people of Tokyo Tower. He arrived in Tokyo four years earlier along with a magical feather of Sakura. He appears to have an interest in Kamui whom he often battles in Tokyo, with both of them being known as the strongest fighters from the area. He is also a friend of Yūko Ichihara, for whom he retrieves items for whenever he traverses to different dimensions. Fūma later appears in Japan Country to give Kurogane a robotic arm while working for Yūko. Some time before this, Fūma encountered Syaoran, realizing he became far more stronger than how Seishirō trained him, but the fight's outcome was unknown. Fūma is a crossover from one of the main characters from the series X, Fūma Monou. Fūma is voiced by Yūji Kishi in Japanese and Joel McDonald in English.

=== Princess Tomoyo ===
Princess Tomoyo (知世姫, Tomoyo Hime) is a princess of a feudal country called Japan who sends the ninja Kurogane on the quest that causes him to join the dimension travelers. Tomoyo is the Tsukuyomi (ツクヨミ), a powerful miko sorceress responsible for maintaining the wards of Japan that protect the country from demons. She is also a dreamseer with the ability to see into other people's dreams and can send trans-dimensional messages through dreams. However, she gives up her dreamseer power to Yūko as the price for bringing Kurogane's group to Japan as she manages to see them in danger following their encounter with Ashura-ō. Another incarnation of her known as Tomoyo Daidouji (大道寺 知世, Daidōji Tomoyo) appears in Piffle World, where she organizes a race whose winner would rewarded with one of Sakura's feathers. The whole event is then revealed to have been created in order to return the feather to Sakura as Princess Tomoyo contacted her about the group's arrival. Another incarnation appears in the animated film in which she is the princess from the Birdcage Kingdom and is opposed by her uncle. Tomoyo is voiced by Maaya Sakamoto in Japanese and Amber Cotton (TV series), Trina Nishimura (OVAs) in English.

=== Ashura-ō ===
Ashura-ō (アシュラ王) is the King of Seresu and a powerful magician who raised Fai D. Flowright after rescuing him from the tower in Valeria. At the start of the series, Ashura-ō is placed in an enchanted sleep by Fai, guarded by Chi. Ashura-ō is the reason why Fai seeks to travel to multiple dimensions and avoids returning to Seresu. It is later revealed that Ashura-ō regularly went on killing sprees among his subjects, and he intended to invoke Fai's curse (which is to kill anyone stronger than himself) to kill him. He had placed a tattoo on Fai to suppress Fai's curse so that it would affect him once, while his own grew with every murder, so he would one day be stronger than Fai. As Fai and his friends return to Seresu, Ashura-ō forces him into fight him to death in order to stop his murders, also engaging in combat the original Syaoran and Kurogane. As he receives a mortal blow from Kurogane, a dying Ashura tells Fai that he will manage to escape the sealing from Seresu caused by Fai's second curse alongside his friends.

=== Clow Reed ===
Clow Reed (クロウ・リード, Kurō Rīdo) is a sorcerer who once ruled Kingdom of Clow, but is dead during the series' start, and appears in flashbacks as the father of Sakura and Tōya. It is later revealed that Clow knew Yūko Ichihara, with whom he had a close relationship. Both of them created the Mokona Modoki creatures in anticipation for the series' events, while he also knew of the creation of the teenager Kimihiro Watanuki. When Yūko was about to die, Clow wished for her to keep on living. As a result, his immense magical powers stopped Yūko's time, granting his wish, but also making him regret being the strongest sorcerer. Additionally, it is revealed that he foresaw the original Syaoran's wish of turning back the time when the original Sakura was about to be killed. As turning back the time changed the fate of Sakura's parents, Clow travelled to Kingdom of Clow to replace Sakura's father, Fujitaka, as the king of Clow. Before dying, he left his life and magical power which would be used to make the Syaoran clone be reborn as a normal human. Clow is voiced by Yu Mizushima in Japanese and Jim Foronda in English.

=== Tōya ===
Tōya (桃矢) is the older brother of Sakura and the young king of the Kingdom of Clow. He is a capable and responsible monarch who is rather protective of his younger sister and dislikes Syaoran because of their close relationships. Various versions of Tōya appear in other worlds featured in Tsubasa, all in which he keeps a friendship with Yukito, the priest from Clow. In the original version of Kingdom of Clow, Tōya is a prince, as the king is his father, Fujikata. When the original Syaoran wished to turn back time, Tōya became king following the death of Clow Reed, who occupied Fujitaka's role when the latter became the clone Syaoran's adoptive father. In the restored timeline at the end of the series, Tōya reappears as a prince. Tōya is voiced by Shin-ichiro Miki in Japanese and Eric Vale in English.

=== Yukito ===
Yukito (雪兎) is a kind and respectful High Priest of Clow Country and love interest of Tōya. After Sakura, he has considerable magical powers, including the ability to see into the future, thus the reason why he was chosen to become the country's high priest. He is one of the few people who know Yūko Ichihara as the Witch of Dimensions and is responsible for sending Syaoran and Sakura to her in hopes of recovering Sakura's scattered memories. Various versions of Yukito appear in other worlds featured in Tsubasa, all in which he keeps his relationship with Tōya. Yukito is voiced by Kōki Miyata in Japanese and Robert McCollum in English.

=== Fujitaka ===
Fujitaka (藤隆) is a gentle man from the Kingdom of Clow who in the series' start, is a late archeologist who adopted the Syaoran clone when he lived in the streets. Travelling with him through various countries, Syaoran also became an archeologist and continued his work after his death. In the original timeline from the Kingdom of Clow, Fujitaka was Clow's king, father of the original Sakura, Tōya and husband from Nadeshiko. Because of the original Syaoran's wish to turn back time, Fujitaka's future changed and Clow Reed replaced him. In the end of the series, Fujitaka appears alive as the king from Clow. A younger alternate self from Fujitaka also appears in the TV series. Fujitaka is voiced by Tokuyoshi Kawashima in Japanese and Kevin M. Connolly in English.

=== Tsubasa (Sakura) ===
Tsubasa (ツバサ), usually called Sakura (サクラ), is a girl who was used by Fei-Wang Reed to create the Sakura clone. She is the princess of the Kingdom of Clow, who befriended and fell in love with the original Syaoran during her childhood. They first met inside the ruins while she is under her cleansing ceremony. Due to her hidden magical power, Sakura was chosen to succeed Nadeshiko, her mother and Clow's current priest, training since a young age. The night before her last ceremony, Fei-Wang placed a "Black Seal" on Sakura, with only her parents and Syaoran knowing it. By the time the black wings grow it will devour her and she will die. After seven years, when the seal was about to kill Sakura, Nadeshiko stopped time and Syaoran wished Yuko to turn back time to save her.

Sakura's soul was frozen in time just before death due to Syaoran's wish, though her body disappeared after being cloned by Fei-Wang. When returning to the Kingdom of Clow, Syaoran manages to rescue her before the seal attacks her again, but her power is used alongside her clone's by Fei-Wang. Awakening during the battle, Sakura joins Syaoran's group to defeat Fei-Wang. At the end of the series, when Syaoran is forced to travel throughout worlds forevers, Sakura wishes to accompany him, but foresees a disaster that will occur if she goes. She then confesses her love to Syaoran, and remains in the Kingdom of Clow awaiting his return. She is voiced by Yui Makino in Japanese and by Monica Rial in English.

=== Subaru ===
Subaru (昴) is one of the vampire twins alongside Kamui that Seishirō is hunting and travels throughout dimensions to escape from him. However, he and Seishirō share a close relationship, as he is his main target, and Subaru once gave him his blood. Upon arriving in the world of Tokyo, Subaru fell asleep due to two of Sakura's feathers. He awakes when Syaoran takes the feathers from the cocoon where he is sleeping, and before leaving to another, he searches for a way to restore the water from Tokyo's City Hall. He is based on the protagonist of the manga Tokyo Babylon, Subaru Sumeragi, who also plays an important role in X. Subaru is voiced by Hiro Shimono in Japanese and Micah Solusod in English.

=== Kamui ===
Kamui (神威) is one of the vampire twins, alongside Subaru, for whom Seishirō is searching. Both of them paid an unknown price for travelling throughout dimensions to Yūko. He first appears in Tokyo as the leader from the City Hall faction from Tokyo, protecting their source of water ever since his arrival from another dimension two years ago. Kamui often battles Fūma, the leader from the Tower, due to their similar strength. Once Subaru awakes from his sleep caused two years ago due to two of Sakura's feathers, the twins prepare to leave to another world. However, as Subaru wants to restore the City Hall's water, Kamui decides to give his blood to Fai in Subaru's place as part of a payment Yūko arranged. Kamui is based on the protagonist in the manga X, Kamui Shirō. Kamui is voiced by Mamoru Miyano in Japanese and Micah Solusod in English.

=== Fai ===
Fai (ファイ) is the twin brother of Fai D. Flowright who took his name. He was born with his identical twin brother, Yui, in Valeria Country. The birth of twins in the country was a bad omen, which led to many misfortunes upon the country. The king imprisoned them within a tower, just before he killed everybody in the country. Eventually, Fei-Wang Reed appeared and offered to free one of them. Fai chose to save Yui, resulting in Fai being thrown from the tower to his death, though Fei-Wang tampered with Yūi's memory to make him think that he chose his own life over Fai. Fai's dead body is kept sealed in Celes thanks to Sakura's feather until the brother decides to give up on him when confronted by his past. Nevertheless, Fai has appeared in the drama CD series Private High School Holitsuba alongside his brother.

=== Sakura Kinomoto ===
Sakura Kinomoto (木之本 桜, Kinomoto Sakura) is a young girl who makes minor appearances in Tsubasa by interacting with the Sakura clone. She makes her debut in the original video animation as a specter guiding the wounded Sakura clone towards the Tokyo Tower while in the manga she gives her magic staff to the Sakura clone so that the clone will use it as a payment towards Yuko. She is also present in a Holitsuba short voiced by Sakura Tange.

=== Syaoran Li ===
Syaoran Li (李 小狼, Ri Shaoran) is a man from parallel dimension from one of the Syaoran clones reborn in the climax of the series. While he is not present in the manga, he is mentioned by the adult clone who tells his wife about how such man gave him an item that they would use to seal themselves for the next years until fighting Fei-Wang Reed.

=== Unnamed Goddess ===
An unnamed Goddess appears in Tsubasa World Chronicle in the world of Nirai Kanai. Despite the title, she is a human whom the original Syaoran believes to be a Kumari. Before the series' beginning, the Goddess meets the original Sakura and learns also of how the two Syaorans once were together with Watanuki in the way to the afterlife after Fei-Wang Reed cursed him in his last moments. As Syaoran returned to the world of the living, the Goddess requests his help to get the dead souls of her world to pass to the cicle of reincarnation. Her bodyguards are two men calling themselves Sakon and Ukon, though Fai perceives that the names be fake. The unnamed Goddess is based on Hana from Gate 7, along with Sakon and Ukon, whom are based on Sakura and Tachibana respectively.

== Other media ==
Various types of merchandising have been released based on Tsubasa: Reservoir Chronicle characters including plush, keychains and figurines. A series of drama CD featuring them have also been released telling different storylines and showing songs by the characters' Japanese voice actors. A spin-off series of drama CD titled Private High School Holitsuba series also sets them in an alternative universe alongside characters from xxxHolic as mates in the fictional school "Holitsuba".

== Reception ==
The way the characters from various Clamp series has been praised by various publications with Carl Kimlinger from Anime News Network stating that fans from such series will enjoy more how they are played in Tsubasa. Although Kimlinger found differences between some characters' traits from their original series, he still found their traits in Tsubasa appealing, pointing to Syaoran's and Sakura's relationship as "almost adorable enough to excuse the glacial pace of its [the anime] advancement." Similarly, IGN's Jeff Harris enjoyed the cast of characters pointing the Syaoran's interesting role due to how he sacrifices his relationship with Sakura, while the comedy developed by Fai and Mokona was also favored. Active Anime's Christopher Seaman found the romantical relationship between Syaoran and Sakura as one of the most mature parts from the series, balancing the other fantastic themes which added more variety to the series' audience. In a general overview, Julie Gray from Comic Book Bin gave positive remarks to the characters' complex personalities and how the plot has been developed throughout its first ten volumes. DVD Talk found them "endearing and memorable, and from start to finish this series will entertain viewers to the fullest", stating that viewers do not need to have read or watched previous Clamp works to understand them. On the other hand, Chris Beveridge from Mania Entertainment stated while that people unrelated with such characters would like Tsubasa: Reservoir Chronicle, other people would "get out of the series."

Mania Entertainment's Megan Lavey called Syaoran's and Sakura's introduction as a "pretty simple love story", while liking the characters' personalities. While its crossover nature with xxxHolic was also praised, a bigger connection found in such characters was also found appealing. Animefringe writer Lesley Smith stated that the main characters' relationship that make readers from the manga "devoted fans", giving praise to all of them pointing some gags they provide as well as how they interact. Smith also liked the use of other Clamp characters, which would persuade readers from other Clamp series to read the series. The change that such relationships make during later volumes was also praised by Manga Life's Joy Kim; while also pointing all the main characters had been notably developed, he also liked how the artwork "does an excellent job of conveying the characters' confusion and anguish". The English cast for the anime has been labelled as "done and very solid" with Christopher Sabat found as its best actor by IGN while Jason Liebrecht's role as Syaoran has been noted to be better than Miyu Irino's work by Carl Kimlinger, who, nevertheless, praised both performances due to how Syaoran's emotions are played. Moreover, Active Anime's Christopher Seaman compared the main casting with the original Japanese as the dub was noted to have "the essence of the Japanese counterparts nicely in speech and tone", remarking Monica Rial's work as Sakura.

For the second half of the manga, writers praised how more darker the cast becomes while retaining their parts of their original characterization. The fights from the cast were well received, most notably the ones involving the two Syaorans. Holly Ellingwood enjoyed the deep connection Syaoran developed with the lead from xxxHolic, Kimihiro Watanuki. Following the ending of Tsubasa, Manga News enjoyed Syaoran's cameo in the 18th volume of xxxHolic as his personal relationship with Watanuki is explored for the first time. In regards to the character's role in Tsubasa World Chronicle, Manga News said that the originals Syaoran and Sakura did not manage to reach a proper happy ending and thus the sequel was necessary to provide the cast a necessary ending by Clamp. Manga News also felt that readers would need to read xxxHolic Rei to understand furthermore the relationship Syaoran and Watanuki have as the latter spends time in his manga collecting items to aid him in his journey.
