= RG Veda =

Manga series and its adaptations

- Cover of RG Veda volume 1 as published by Shinshokan

聖伝-RG VEDA- (Seiden: Rigu Vēda)
- Genre: Fantasy, drama, adventure
- Manga
- Written by: Clamp
- Published by: Shinshokan
- English publisher: NA: Dark Horse Comics
- Magazine: Wings
- Original run: 1989 – 1996
- Volumes: 10
- Original video animation
- Directed by: Hiroyuki Ebata (#1); Takamasa Ikegami (#2)
- Written by: Nanase Ohkawa
- Music by: Nick Wood
- Studio: Usagi Ya (#1); Studio Signal (#2)
- Licensed by: AUS: Manga Entertainment; NA: Central Park Media; UK: Manga Entertainment
- Released: June 1, 1991 – June 21, 1992
- Runtime: 45 minutes (each)
- Episodes: 2
- icon

RG Veda (Japanese: 聖伝-RG VEDA-, Hepburn: Seiden: Rigu Vēda) is a manga created by Clamp, consisting of ten volumes in all. It was first published in Japan in 1989 as Clamp's debut manga. The story features elements of Vedic mythology; the title itself is pronounced Rigveda, the name of one of the four Vedas. The series is known for its extravagant and richly detailed art. It inspired a 2-episode anime OVA that was released through 1991 to 1992. The OVAs were licensed by Central Park Media, while Manga Entertainment licensed it in the UK and Australia, with a different English dub.

The RG Veda manga has been translated and released in many different languages. Tokyopop has released English versions in the United States. However, they have since lost the rights, which Dark Horse Comics acquired; Dark Horse published it in omnibus form in 2016.

== Plot ==
Three hundred years ago, the god of thunder, Taishakuten, rebelled against the Heavenly Emperor, killing both him and the guardian god Ashura-ō. With the help of Ashura-ō's wife Shashi, he usurped the throne and began his cruel reign as the new Emperor. However, a prophecy was made by the stargazer Kuyō, first to Ashura-ō and then to Yasha-ō:

Six stars will fall to this plane. The dark stars that will defy the Heavens. And you shall undertake a journey. One that begins when you find the child of a vanished race. I cannot discern the child's alignment. I only know that it is he alone who can turn the wheels of Tenkai's destiny. For it is by Heavenly Mandate that through this child, the Six Stars shall begin to gather. And then someone shall appear from the shadows. Even my powers cannot clearly make out his figure, but he knows the future and can manipulate both evil and heavenly stars. A roaring flame shall raze the wicked. Six stars will overpower all others. And inevitably, they will be the schism that splits the Heavens.

Following this prophecy, the Guardian Warrior of the northland, Yasha-ō, awakens the genderless child of Ashura-ō, Ashura, who has slept the last three hundred years under a magical seal. Believing the prophecy to mean that the "Six Stars" together can overthrow Taishakuten, he and Ashura set out to find the "Six Stars". Over time, five of the Six Stars gather as Yasha-ō and Ashura, the first two stars, are joined by Sōma, Ryu-ō and Karura-ō, the other three. A mysterious character who appears and disappears quite regularly, Kujaku, gives them helpful advice, but his nature and intentions are unclear.

The gentle and childlike Ashura (who is usually referred to as "he" out of convenience, though some translations use a female pronoun) soon reveals a deadly alter-ego, a youth who delights in death and destruction, but this side remains for the longest time more or less suppressed, also by Ashura's affection for Yasha-ō.

Seeking to bring Taishakuten's reign to an end, the Six Stars finally enter Zenmi-jō, Taishakuten's palace. They are met there by the three remaining "Four Generals" (Shitennō) (one was killed by Yasha-ō earlier), warriors who swore to protect Taishakuten. The Six Stars are shocked to discover that the sixth Star, Kendappa-ō, their friend and ally, is among them as Jikokuten, the previously unknown general. By the meeting of all the Six Stars, Ashura's dark nature is brought to the surface. He kills his mother, the traitorous Shashi, takes the seal on her forehead and merges it with his sword Shura-tō, to awaken the true Ashura; the god of flame, blood and war, whose aim is to destroy heaven, earth, and hell.

The true Ashura proceeds to complete his awakening by killing the remaining Six Stars (some of them were killed earlier). He kills the stars one by one, absorbing their power, until only Yasha-ō is left. Surprisingly, Taishakuten stands against him. It turns out that his cruel reign was really a plot by him and the deceased Ashura-ō to prevent the gathering of the Six Stars and the true Ashura's awakening. However, it is not Taishakuten who stops Ashura, but Ashura himself. As he is about to deal Yasha-ō the final blow, Ashura at the last moment stabs himself instead. He is then enveloped in a cocoon and enters into a deep sleep. Ashura is awakened hundreds of years later when Kujaku sacrifices his own life, on Yasha-ō's promise that he will not let Ashura become the God of Destruction again.

== Production ==
Clamp began work on RG Veda as a doujinshi comic, which attracted the attention of the publisher Shinshokan. Clamp decided to make a work based on eastern mythology rather than western myth as they were more familiar with the former. Part of this influence came from Clamp member Mokona, who grew up in Kyoto and became familiar with Hinduism and esoteric Buddhism due to her living close to temples and shrines as a child. When the series debuted, in order to secure a continued run Clamp had to surpass sales of the first tankobon volume. The first print run sold out, and as a result the group were given no other conditions to continue production.

== Media ==
=== Manga ===
Written and illustrated by Clamp, the RG Veda chapters were serialized in Wings from 1989 to 1996. Shinshokan collected the chapters in ten tankōbon volumes. The first was published on February 10, 1990; the final was released on May 15, 1996.

RG Veda is licensed for an English-language release in North America by Tokyopop. It released the first volume on April 12, 2005, and the final volume on September 11, 2007. The series was then re-released by Dark Horse Comics in a series of three collected editions, coming out between August 24, 2016, and August 15, 2018.

=== Anime ===
RG Veda was adapted into a two-part original video anime between 1991 and 1992, adapting part of the middle of the story. It was produced by Animate Film. It was released in the United States by Central Park Media and in the United Kingdom by Manga Entertainment. British anime critic Jonathan Clements has stated RG Veda was part of a series UK anime releases meant to follow the success of the film Akira but failed to live up to it, giving anime a bad reputation in the UK sci-fi circles.

== Reception ==
=== Manga ===
In his review of Volume 1 of the TokyoPop release, Carlo Santos of the Anime News Network gave RG Veda a B grading. He commented that while the series was not their best work, "CLAMP's florid art style is already fully developed", and: "Principal artist Mokona Apapa shows great confidence in her linework, rendering the characters with dramatic expressions and poses. These characters look awfully alike, though—'that dude with the dark, wavy hair' could be any one of three or four possible candidates. In fact, it might not even be a dude." A review on IGN of the first volume criticised the opening for being too heavy on exposition, but added that it got better after the first chapter and a half and that they wanted to continue reading after they completed the volume. They also praised the prophecy at the heart of the story for being "one of the more interesting ones in that the future it foretells doesn't seem to be all that much better than the present." Mason Templar, writing in Manga: The Complete Guide, gave the series a rating of 1.5 stars out of 4, saying that while there was some "beautiful composition" and praising the ending, criticised the lack of action, the dialogue, and the art claiming: "The artwork is dense and generic, looking more like You Higuri than later CLAMP manga." Modern critics have praised RG Veda for having early depictions of LGBT characters, with the series featuring several same-sex relationships as well as Ashura being genderless.

Reviewing the Dark Horse omnibus version, Jason Bradley Thompson of Otaku USA listed RG Veda as "Recommended", saying: "Fast-paced, full of action, and with beautiful artwork even though it's CLAMP's earliest work, it's easy to see why this was a hit when it came out in 1989. ... Best of all, it moves quickly, avoiding the tendency to drag out the foreshadowing that afflicts many manga of this type (and even CLAMP's own series X)." Ian Wolf gave the series 10 out of 10 in MyM, praising the artwork, characters, backgrounds and clothing designs.

=== Anime ===
A review of the RG Veda anime OVA by The Anime Review describes the anime as, "a dud", giving it a C− rating and writing that: "Although the artwork is fantastic, for an action-adventure show, the pacing is horrendous." They also added: "The only redeeming quality is that the OVA manages to get somewhere near the end, at least resolving the basic plot it had created while leaving itself wide open for sequels." Jeremy A Beard of THEM Anime Reviews gave the anime two out of five stars, describing the RG Veda OVA as: "easily the worst CLAMP anime adaptation to date."
