= Fai D. Flowright =

Fictional character from Tsubasa: Reservoir Chronicle

Fai D. Flourite
- Tsubasa: Reservoir Chronicle character
- Fai as illustrated by Clamp
- First appearance: Tsubasa: Reservoir Chronicle chapter 2 (2004)
- Created by: Clamp
- Voiced by: Daisuke Namikawa (Japanese); Vic Mignogna (English)

In-universe information
- Alias: Yūi
- Weapon: Staff
- Relatives: Fai (twin brother)

Fai D. Flowright (Japanese: ファイ・D・フローライト, Hepburn: Fai D. Furōraito; also known as Fai D. Flourite in the Japanese version), born Yūi (ユゥイ), is a fictional character introduced Clamp's manga series Tsubasa: Reservoir Chronicle. Fai is a sorcerer from the country of Celes who escapes in order to request the witch Yuko Ichihara to travel to other worlds and never return to his homeland. He meets Syaoran, Sakura, Kurogane and Mokona with whom he develops relationships. Despite his easygoing nature, Fai's true objective remains hidden which is further explored when the character is forced to return to his world alongside the group.

Clamp created Fai as an adult character that would assist the younger hero Syaoran and assist him in the narrative. His design was made to contrast Kurogane similar to the yin and yang. As the manga progressed, Fai's characterization becomes darker, something Clamp often dealt with to the point of struggling with the idea of killing him. In the anime adaptations of the series Fai is voiced by Daisuke Namikawa in Japanese and Vic Mignogna in English.

Critical reception to Fai's character has been positive based on his carefree nature and relationship he forms with the rest of the cast. When the series reached its second half, critics found Fai to undergo a tragic arc as he suffers a major injury and relives his tragic childhood, making his actions far more impactful.

== Creation and development ==
The characters of Fai D. Flowright and Kurogane were created in order to have adult characters who would side with Syaoran, who was much younger and was still in development during the series' start. Nanase Ohkawa stated that both Fai and Kurogane's were designed to contrast each other: "Kurogane is dressed in black but is a more straightforward character. Fai is dressed in white but his character is harder to read." During a panel discussion, Ohkawa acknowledged fan enthusiasm for a romantic pairing between Fai and Kurogane. However, by 2006, Ohkawa suggested that Fai's fate would be complicated by future events in the narrative. Clamp's editor Kiichiro Sugawara was surprised by Fai's popularity as he ranked higher than Kurogane despite not being active fighter, something he found commonly praised by male readers.

Fai's original clothing involved the idea of giving him sophisticated tone. The portrayal of Fai and his twin brother was felt by Clamp as a common element they tackle in most of their works. In this case, they wanted portray a tragic storyline involving the two twin's childhoods. Originally, Clamp aimed to kill Fai's character during the narrative but declined believing it would be a poor decision.

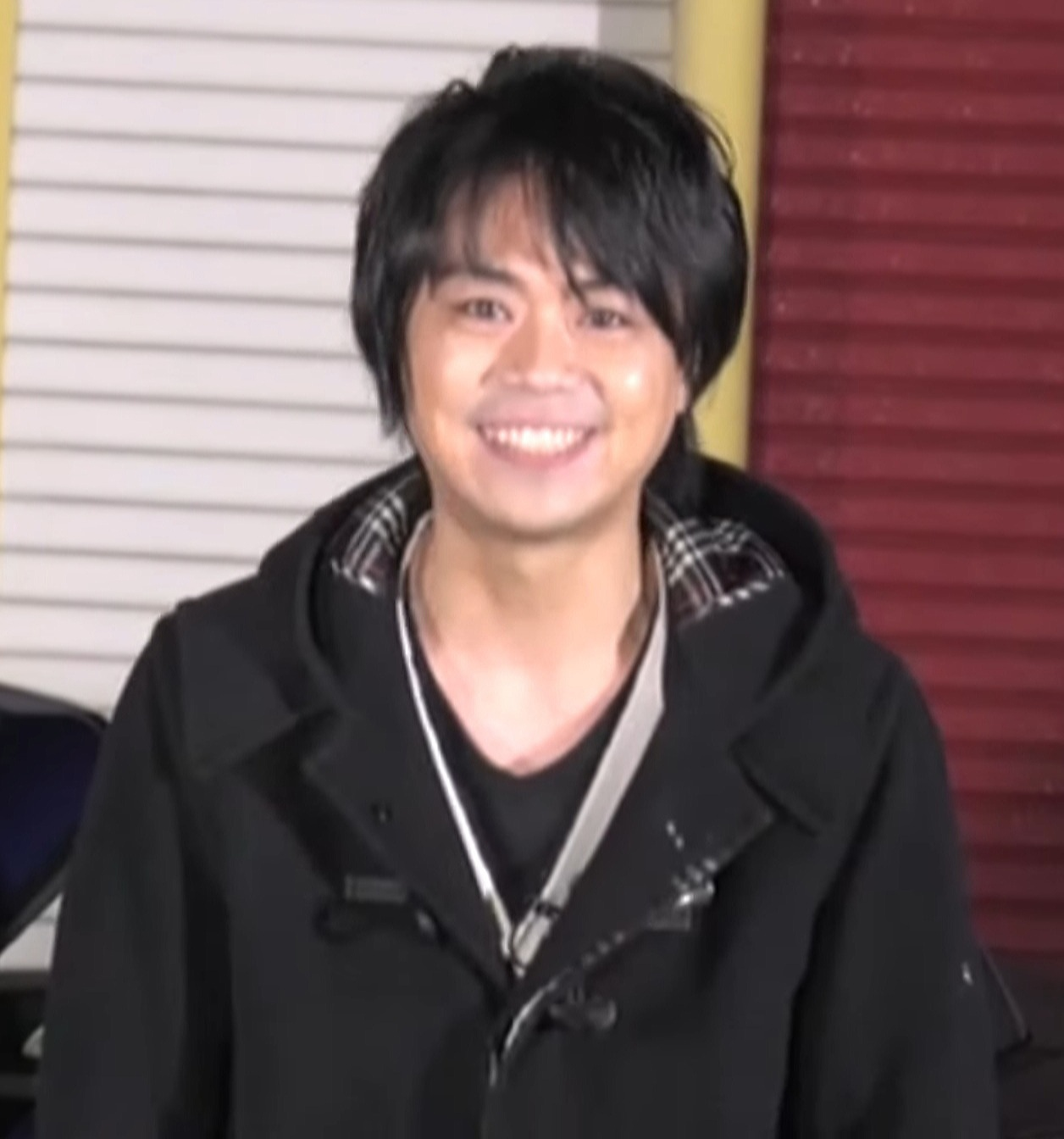
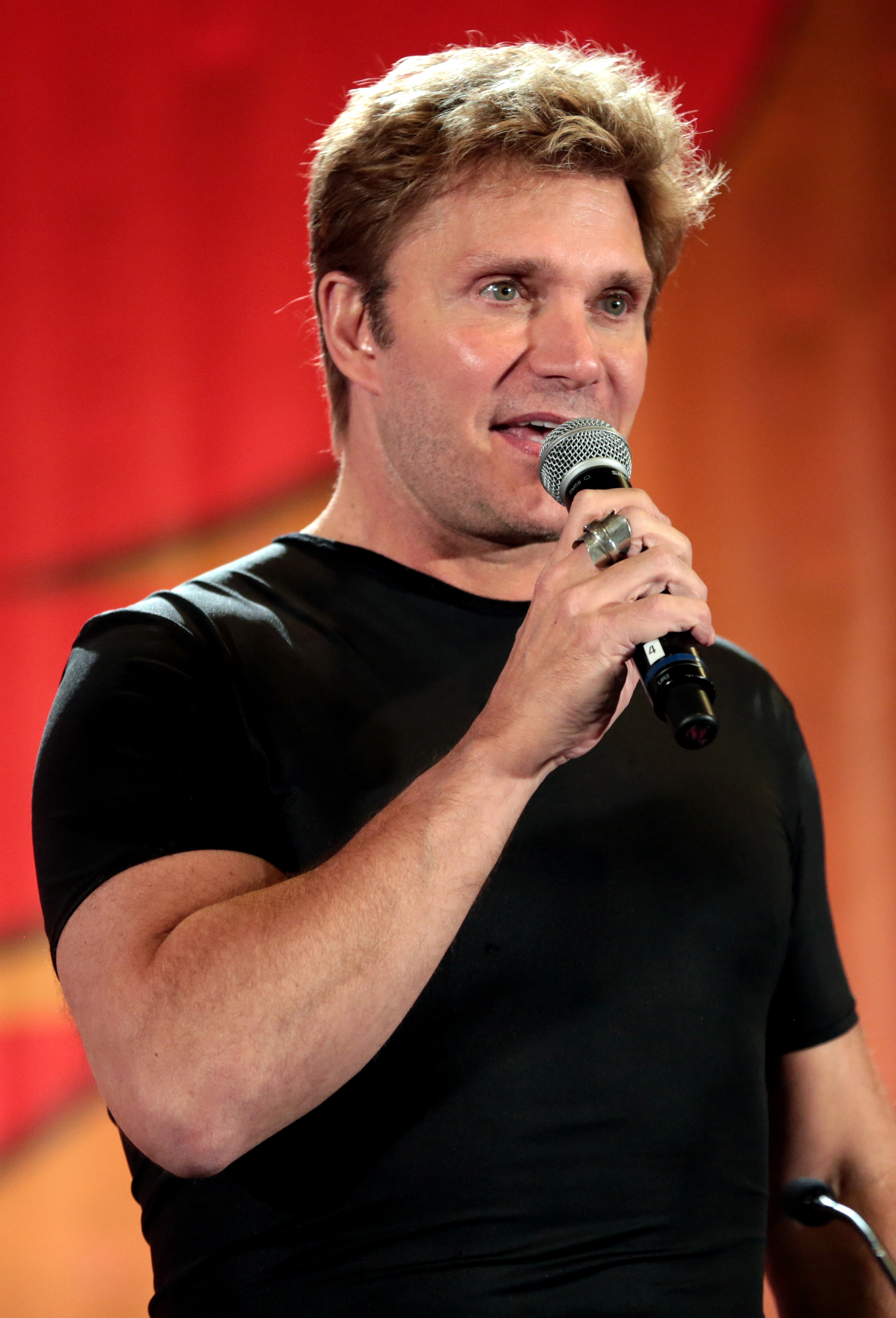
Daisuke Namikawa (left) and Vic Mignogna (right) voiced Fai in Japanese and English respectively

In the original anime adaptation, Fai was voiced by Daisuke Namikawa. Namikawa stated that, from his point of view, Fai was hard to understand but there were signs in the manga that he suffered too much in his childhood. As the anime series did not focus on him, Nanikawa looked forward to explore Fai's background in the original video animations following the Tokyo Revelations trilogy. However, as the staff skipped the Celes arc and instead moved to Japan's, Namikawa expressed disappointment for not being able to portray the scenes of Fai. Nevertheless, Namikawa expected satisfaction with the way he worked for the series.

English Voice actor Vic Mignogna referred to Fai alongside Qrow from RWBY as one of his favorite characters based on their calm personalities in contrast to other works he has done involving characters who have a tendency to scream. As a result, he views Fai and Qrow as characters he can perform easily for a long determined time.

== Appearances ==
Fai is a powerful magician from the country of Celes. He travels to Yūko on his own accord after sealing his king Ashura-ō and having his creation, Chī, alert him if Ashura awakens. He wishes never to return to his country, so he gives up a magical tattoo on his back in exchange for Mokona to travel through dimensions. Having lost his tattoo, Fai refuses to use magic anymore and relies on weapons to battle. Fai appears to be cheerful and good-natured, and acts very carefree. He often teases Kurogane, who questions this nature, sensing that it is just a false persona to hide that he is emotionally distant. Fai does not bother to fight hard for his life, and will only do so if someone he cares for is in danger, which Kurogane notes to be Syaoran and Sakura, as Fai breaks his own rule to use magic to save them.

Fai's real name is Yui and he was born with his identical twin brother, Fai, as Princes in Valeria Country. The birth of twins in the country was a bad omen, which led to many misfortunes upon the country. When the twins joined their magics, they were even more powerful than the King. The King claims that the twin's mother committed suicide out of shame for birthing twins and their father died from one of the "misfortunes". However, it is strongly suggested that the King is losing his sanity as he locks the twins in a pocket dimension where they never age and the dead of the Kingdom literally pile up. It is revealed that the King wipes out all the people in the Kingdom and eventually takes his own life in front of the twins. Eventually, Fei-Wang Reed appeared and offered to free one of them. Fai chose to save Yūi, resulting in Fai being thrown from the tower to his death, though Fei-Wang tampered with Yūi's memory to make him think that he chose his own life over Fai. Promising to return Fai to life if Yūi becomes his pawn, Fei-Wang bestowed two curses upon him. The curses are to kill whoever is a stronger magician than he is (intended to kill Syaoran but is intentionally triggered by Sakura), and another curse that will use his own magic to collapse the world around them. He was soon found by Ashura-ō, who took in Yūi, having adopted the name Fai. Ashura gave him his tattoo to suppress the growth of Fai's magic and forbade Fai from using magic without his tattoo. Fai eventually learned that Ashura's intent was to be killed by Fai's first curse, as Ashura killed people in order to make his own magic stronger.

Fai is given two of Sakura's feathers. He uses one to create Chii (whom he apparently made to look like his departed mother), and the other is the feather Fai "found" in the first world the group travels to after meeting Yuuko. Without that first feather Sakura would have shortly passed away. Fai was aware that he would eventually travel with Syaoran and co. and act as Reed's agent. However the positive influence that his companions would have on Fai was not taken into consideration, nor the lengths Kurogane would go to save Fai from his curses.

The source of Fai's magical powers is the blue color of his eyes that allow him to perform spells, which also greatly increases his lifespan. His powers are effectively halved when Syaoran consumes his left eye and is forced to become a vampire using Kamui's blood to save his life. He gains regeneration, though he has to regularly drink Kurogane's blood. He later gives up the rest of his magic in order for Yūko to restore Kurogane's lost arm with a mechanical one. Later he recovers his lost left eye when the clone Syaoran is killed by Fei-Wang. Following Fei-Wang's death, he, Kurogane and Mokona decide to accompany the original Syaoran in a journey who is unable to stay in any dimension for a determined time.

Fai appears in other adaptations of Tsubasa, including the animated film Tsubasa Reservoir Chronicle the Movie: The Princess in the Birdcage Kingdom. In Clamp's Kobato. anime and a xxxHolic chapter, Fai makes a guest appearance along with the original Syaoran, Kurogane and Mokona.

== Reception ==
There's very little lightheartedness to be found anywhere in these chapters, especially where Fai is concerned. Not only has he lost an eye, gone vampire against his will, and stabbed his companion, now we get to see his tragic past and the curses that haunt him. CLAMP lays it on thick, and Fai fans will want to keep a handkerchief handy.

— Sakura Eries, The Fandom Post

In a general overview of the series Comics Worth Reading stated that Fai is "impossible not to like him immediately" based on his easygoing personality but felt that "he keeps his past and what is really going on inside him a secret. He's an actor that doesn't allow anyone backstage." Despite his initial fight sequences found appealing by Manga Life's Michael Aronson, the writer expected Fai's characterization would be further explored as he felt the main cast to be dull. Animefringe writer Lesley Smith enjoyed his calm scenes with Sakura and design made alongside Syaoran for a volume cover. IGN's Jeff Harris enjoyed the comedy developed by Fai and Mokona during early episodes of the series. Carl Kimlinger felt that the constant interactions between Fai and Kurogane appear to feel like shounen-ai despite the impact of such talks being lost. Vic Mignogna's portrayal as Fai was further praised by Kimlinger in regards to how lively he comes across. Kimlinger noted Chobits fans would interested on Fai based on his interactions with Chi.

Fai was noted have hidden depths in the series but Carlos Santos from Anime News Network found that, by the 15th volume, Clamp still kept it in secret and hoped that the authors focused on it rather than doing multiple characters at the same time in Tokyo's arc. Sakura Eries from Mania Entertainment considered Fai's loss of his eye at the hands of Syaoran as too gruesome event in the manga, claiming "A warning to Fai-fans: what Syaoran does after defeating Fai is disturbing. Personally, I don't think it makes sense for Syaoran to take over Fai's powers by doing such a thing, but either way, it's gross." Despite criticizing the darker narrative the series takes in the Tokyo arc, Eries said that the use of Kamui and Subaru being vampires was well executed, as through their aid, Fai manages to survive from his blood loss after Syaoran taking his eye, and then becomes a vampire to survive. Like other critics, the writer wondered when Clamp would explore his past. Following his transformation into a vampire, Manga News stated that the relationship between Fai and Kurogane kept changing which would attract more readers despite the brief dialogues the two have.

The same site kept noting that Fai's secret commentaries with Sakura were easy to notice by Kurogane and found that his character kept becoming far darker with most chapters as his origins were revealed and he was given a tragic fate due to his actions. Eries from the Fandom Post said that the hints behind Fai's past build up an event that "at the close of this volume are perplexing". Santos said the continuous foreshadowing of Fai's past starts delivering major twists in the story, including his sudden attack towards Sakura that would shock the readers. When Fai's background was fully revealed, Eries from the Fandom Post stated that this manga was filled with angst based how tragic was the character's childhood. The reviewer compared Fai's dilemma with Sakura as both of these characters started dealing with dark story elements in the second half of the manga in contrast to the first half where the two were the most cheerful members from the main group. With most of Fai's character arc being finished in Celes, Santos claimed that the series might be close to its ending even though Fai and other members from the cast keep talking about previous events in the form of expositions that would bother the readers. For the ending, MangaNews lamented Kurogane and Fai were given a less prominent role as the narrative primarily focused on the clone characters.
