= Kurogane (Tsubasa: Reservoir Chronicle) =

- Tsubasa: Reservoir Chronicle character
- Kurogane as illustrated by Clamp
- First appearance: Tsubasa: Reservoir Chronicle chapter 2 (2003)
- Created by: Clamp
- Voiced by: Tetsu Inada (Japanese); Christopher Sabat (English)

In-universe information
- Aliases: Yōō (manga); Haganemaru (anime)
- Weapon: Ōdachi; Katana
- Relatives: Lord of Suwa Province (father); Priestess of Suwa Province (mother); Princess Tomoyo (mistress)

Kurogane (Japanese: 黒鋼), born Yōō (Japanese: 鷹王) in the manga and Haganemaru (Japanese: 鋼丸) in the anime, is a fictional character from Clamp's manga series Tsubasa: Reservoir Chronicle. Kurogane is a poor tempered ninja from Japan who is obsessed with fighting. His lady, Princess Tomoyo, exiles him to modern Japan where Kurogane joins with the wizard Fai D. Flowright and two teenagers known as Syaoran and Sakura who are in the need of travelling different dimensions. The witch Yuko Ichihara gives them such power at the cost of their most treasured item with Kurogane giving his sword. Across the narrative, Kurogane bonds with the other travelers and learns that his parents were killed by the same people who attacked Syaoran and Sakura's country, making him look for revenge. He also makes cameos in other Clamp's works.

Clamp created Kurogane and Fai with the idea of having strong supporting characters who would assist the younger protagonist Syaoran. He is meant to contrast Fai in terms of design and personality while his fighting skills were based on Clamp's liking of swordsmanship. The character is voiced by Tetsu Inada in Japanese and Christopher Sabat in English.

Despite initial mixed reception to the character's personality, his personal character development allowed audiences to view him in a much more positive light. Kurogane's bonds with the travelling group was well received especially with his backstory revealed. Kurogane's overall character growth was very highly critically received. Sabat's acting as Kurogane was often considered as the best one provided by Funimation for the English dub.

== Creation and development ==
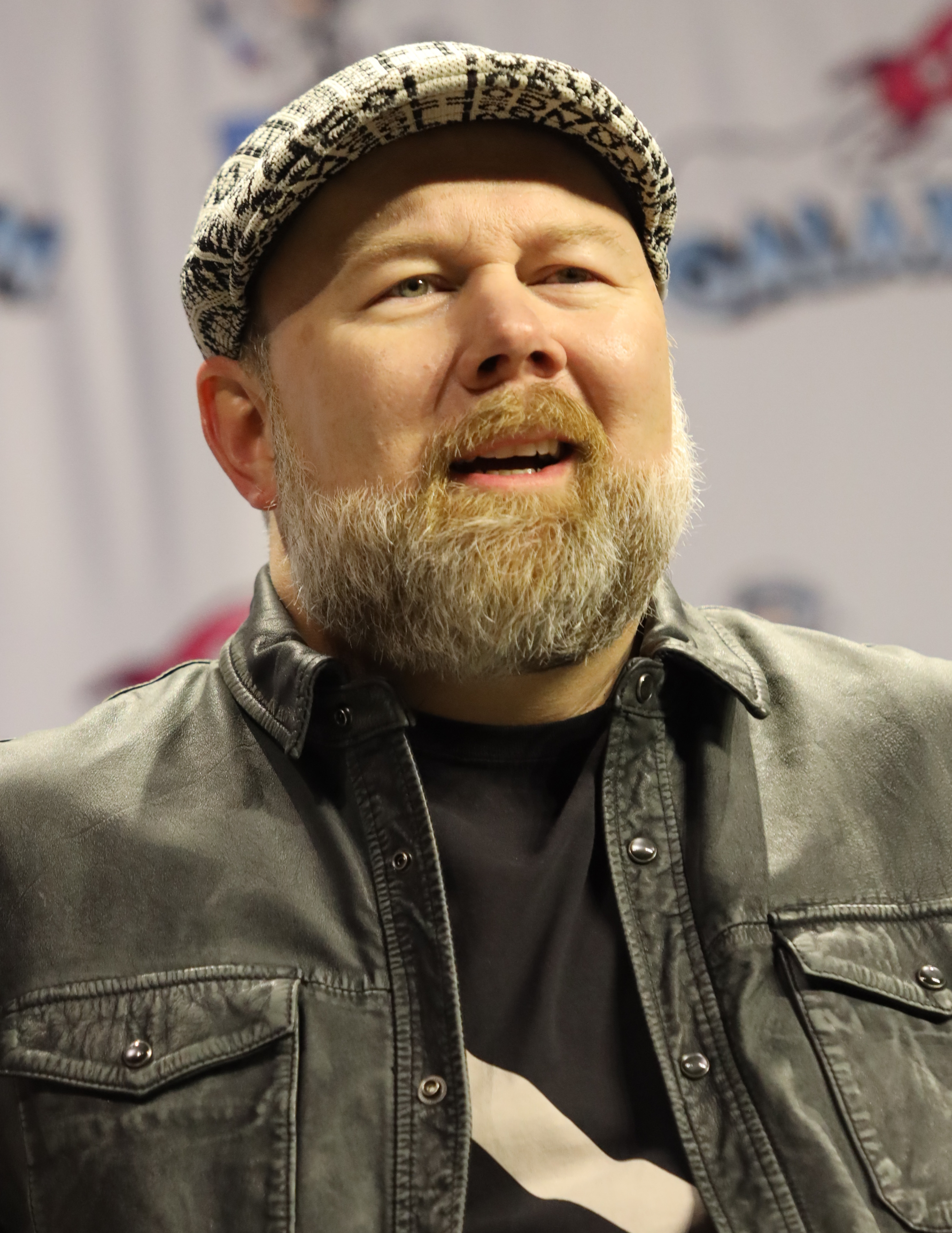
Christopher Sabat voices Kurogane in the English dub

The characters of Kurogane and Fai D. Flowright by Clamp and were created in order to have adult characters who would side with Syaoran, who was much younger and was still in development during the series' start. Clamp headwriter Nanase Ohkawa stated that both Fai and Kurogane's were designed to contrast each other: "Kurogane is dressed in black but is a more straightforward character. Fai is dressed in white but his character is harder to read." Clamp pointed that Kurogane has a tendency to understand Fai's personality, possibly aiming that their relationship would deepen across the story. Meanwhile, he takes a more fatherlike relationship with Syaoran and Sakura when dealing with comical scenes. Clamp's editor Kiichiro Sugawara noted that Kurogane would be the most popular character from the series due to his strength, something which he stated the male demographic liked. However, he was shocked when Fai took a higher place than him even though the latter is not too active in action sequences. Nevertheless, Sugawara told Clamp that Kurogane could be better received by the readers if he developed a bond with Syaoran, something which he also found popular in the shonen manga.

In regards to writing the character's relationship, Clamp found important to draw both Tomoyo and write her name when Kurogane remembers her as an example of the younger demographic Tsubasa has in comparison to their other work, xxxHolic, aimed towards adult readers. His original clothing involved emphasis on the handling of the shadows and the red moon while featuring in order to bring a classic Japanese appeal. When writing him, Clamp took a liking to make Kurogane shout the name of his swordsmanship techniques regardless of how difficult they would be to pronounce. Since Syaoran is mentored techniques by this character, Clamp thought about him do that in the future of the series.

Kurogane is voiced in Japanese by Tetsu Inada who took a liking to the character. In English, Kurogane is voiced by Christopher Sabat. Sabat compared Kurogane's characterization with One Piece's Roronoa Zoro and YuYu Hakusho's Kazuma Kuwabara, describing them as "the tough guy with a heart of gold". As a result, Sabat feared that he sometimes performs similar voices despite the fact the characters are different. He also tried seeing the original actors' works, in order to avoid to get a more specific delivery.

== Appearances ==
Kurogane is a rough-mannered ninja from the world of Japan, who is sent away from his world by Princess Tomoyo in order to have him discover his true strength. He is the most powerful warrior in his world, but he shows no mercy to anyone, so Tomoyo places a "curse" on him that will decrease his strength if he kills anyone. He gives up his replica of the sword, Ginryū (銀竜; lit. 'Silver Dragon'), as the price to use Mokona to cross dimensions and return to his home world. He quickly bonds with the group, to the point he starts tutoring Syaoran. He is constantly teased by Fai, who calls him a variety of nicknames, though he also is able to tell Fai's true nature. However blunt and crude Kurogane may act, he is actually quite observant and perceptive, being always acutely aware of his surroundings.

Kurogane is the son of the lord of the Suwa Province and the miko who protected the area with a magical barrier. He trained under his father in swordsmanship, wishing to become stronger so that he could protect those he loved. Eventually, Fei-Wang Reed flooded the area with demons, which led to the death of his father, and Fei-Wang personally killed Kurogane's mother through a dimensional portal. Kurogane went into a rage, killing all of the demons while grasping his mother's body, and he was calmed by Tomoyo. He eventually learns that the whole attack is part of Fei-Wang's plan to make him a pawn, but interference from Yuko caused Tomoyo to reach him first. After learning this, Kurogane continues the journey in part to kill Fei-Wang.

After giving Ginryū to Yūko, he obtains the sword Sōhi (蒼氷; lit. 'Blue Ice') which he wields until losing it in Celes. After he amputates his left arm to save Fai being sealed in Celes, he is granted an artificial arm through Fūma thanks to Fai. In Japan, Kurogane learns that the curse is actually a protective charm, and his only loss of strength was the loss of his arm, which helps him realize that strength is not enough to protect people. Tomoyo later gives him the original Ginryū, which he continues wielding. Kurogane continues to travel with Fai, Mokona and the original Syaoran throughout dimension after the series ends as the original Syaoran has been forced to travel forever.

Kurogane appears in other adaptations of Tsubasa, including the animated film Tsubasa Reservoir Chronicle the Movie: The Princess in the Birdcage Kingdom. In the anime adaption of Clamp's Kobato. series as well as xxxHolic chapter, Kurogane makes a guest appearance with the original Syaoran, Fai and Mokona. In the Tsubasa sequel manga, Tsubasa: World Chronicle: Nirai Kanai, Kurogane and his allies travel to the title world in order to get information regarding the appearance of Syaoran's clone.

== Reception ==
Initially, he is the least likable character, but there is an ocean of depth to him. We learn his back story in volume 13, and from that point forward, he becomes the de facto leader and core of emotional stability for the group.

— Ed Sizemore, Comics Worth Reading

Multiple writers commented on Kurogane's character. Carl Kimlinger felt that the constant interactions between Fai and Kurogane appear to feel like shounen-ai despite the impact of such talks being lost. Nevertheless, he praised Christopher Sabat's acting, finding it superior to the original Japanese actor. IGN also praised Sabat's acting, calling it the best one in the entire series, also enjoying how sometimes Kurogane comes across as comic relief through his interactions with Fai and Mokona. In regards to his design, Anime News Network praised Kurogane's sex appeal portrayed in the OVAs made stronger by performances of Tetsu Inada and Sabat without claiming either of them to be superior to the other.

In a general overview of the series Comics Worth Reading writer Ed Sizemore commented that while Kurogane initially comes across as the least likable character from the manga due to his poor temper among other personality traits, the revelation of his past and growth make him more enjoyable. The contrast he and Fai have based on how different they are also earned positive response. When the character's background was explored in the manga, Kimlinger noted that regardless of the chapters produced in order to write this backstory, Kurogane's narrative was well executed as it also connected the original narrative in regards to Syaoran and Sakura's origins from the Kingdom of Clow in the series' introduction. Kimlinger felt that either fans of Kurogane or not would enjoy the story thanks to Clamp's writing. Furthermore, Kurogane's display of swordsmanship in the volume was noted to be well drawn with signs of how the plot would become darker. Manga News was also pleased with Kurogane's portrayal in his childhood based on how much his work as well how it is connected with Syaoran's life when reaching its end.

Following his transformation Fai's transformation vampire after his pact with Kurogane, Manga News stated that the relationship between Fai and Kurogane kept changing which would attract more readers despite the brief dialogues the two have. As the manga became darker in the second half, Manga News praised the amount of comic relief provided by Kurogane, Mokona and the original Syaoran when interacting for the first time in contrast to the rest members from the cast. The eventual confrontation involving Kurogane against Fai was noted by the write to have generated a major impact due to the relationship these two have developed across the story and praised how Kurogane does not talk too much in the match after so many flashbacks centered around Fai's past, balancing the action and dialogue. In its eventual following arc, Kurogane was praised for how he developed a more charismatic personality when interacting with Tomoyo ever since the manga's beginning, making him more appealing. Although The Fandom Post claimed that by this events both Kurogane and Fai appear to have reached their original goals, it was believed that these two will still continue on the journey to protect the missing Sakura. For the ending, MangaNews lamented Kurogane and Fai were given a less prominent role as the narrative primarily focused on the clone characters.
