= XxxHolic =

Japanese manga series and its franchise

- xxxHolic
- First tankōbon volume cover
- Genre: Dark fantasy
- Manga
- Written by: Clamp
- Published by: Kodansha
- English publisher: NA: Kodansha USA; UK: Tanoshimi
- Imprint: KCDX (2003–11); YMKCDX (2013–)
- Magazine: Weekly Young Magazine (2003–10, 2013–present); Bessatsu Shōnen Magazine (2010–2011)
- Original run: February 24, 2003 – present
- Volumes: 25
- Series titles
- 1. xxxHolic (2003–2011, 19 volumes); 2. xxxHolic Rei (2013–present, 6 volumes)
- Anime television series
- Directed by: Tsutomu Mizushima
- Produced by: Toru Kawaguchi; Shuichi Machida; Junji Seki; Tetsuya Watanabe; Tsuyoshi Yoshida; Nanase Ohkawa
- Written by: Nanase Ohkawa; Michiko Yokote
- Music by: S.E.N.S.
- Studio: Production I.G
- Licensed by: Crunchyroll
- Original network: TBS
- English network: SEA: Animax; US: Funimation Channel
- Original run: April 6, 2006 – June 26, 2008
- Episodes: 37 + 4 OVAs
- Novel

xxxHolic: AnotherHolic
- Written by: Nisio Isin
- Illustrated by: Clamp
- Published by: Kodansha
- English publisher: NA: Del Rey Manga
- Published: August 1, 2006
- Anime film
- xxxHolic: A Midsummer Night's Dream (2005)
- Live-action television series
- CLAMP Drama xxxHolic (2013)
- Stage play
- xxxHolic (2021); xxxHolic -Zoku- (2023)
- Live-action film
- xxxHolic (2022)
- icon

xxxHolic (stylized as ×××HOLiC; pronounced "Holic") is a Japanese manga series written and illustrated by the manga group Clamp. The series, which crosses over with another Clamp work, Tsubasa: Reservoir Chronicle, revolves around Kimihiro Watanuki, a high school student who is disturbed by his ability to see the supernatural, and Yūko Ichihara, a powerful witch who owns a wish-granting shop. When Watanuki asks Ichihara to remove his ability to see spirits, she grants it on the condition that he pay for his wish by working for her. Clamp created xxxHolic to link the supernatural and fantasy series.

xxxHolic was serialized in Kodansha's seinen manga magazine Weekly Young Magazine periodically from February 2003 until March 2010. It then moved to the shōnen manga magazine Bessatsu Shōnen Magazine in June 2010, where it ended serialization in February 2011; its chapters were collected in 19 tankōbon volumes. A sequel, xxxHolic: Rei, started in Weekly Young Magazine in 2013. It was first published in the United States by Del Rey Manga and in the United Kingdom by Tanoshimi in 2004, then was later published in a series of omnibuses by Kodansha Comics as of 2014. In 2005, Production I.G adapted the manga into an animated film, which was followed by two anime television series, and various original video animations (OVAs). Funimation licensed the film and the first TV series in North America, and released both of them on DVD as well as Blu-ray Disc. A light novel and a video game have also been released based on the series.

The manga has been well received by both Japanese and English readers and has appeared in various rankings of bestselling books. Critics have generally praised the series for its illustrations and its portrayal of supernatural elements.

== Plot ==
Kimihiro Watanuki is a high school student plagued by ayakashi spirits which are invisible to everyone else but him. The series begins when Watanuki stumbles, seemingly by chance, into a shop that grants wishes. The shop is owned by Yūko Ichihara, a mysterious witch of many names and esoteric renown. For a price, she offers to grant Watanuki's wish to be rid of the spirits. The price, according to Yūko, must be of equal value; so, as payment, he must become Yūko's temporary, part-time cook and housekeeper. While his established job consists of household chores, Yūko increasingly sends him on errands of a supernatural or spiritual nature as the series develops. Himawari Kunogi, Watanuki's love interest, and Shizuka Dōmeki, a classmate whom Watanuki initially detests, occasionally join him in his work as per Yūko's request. The three become increasingly close, and though Watanuki is often annoyed with Dōmeki, he grows to value the new friendships he makes and his life at the wish shop. At the same time, though, he begins to worry about Yūko, wondering if she who grants wishes to others ever has anything to wish for herself. Eventually, he makes a promise to try and grant her a wish, should she have one.

With each supernatural encounter, Watanuki becomes more familiar with and connected to the spiritual world. A crossing plotline with the concurrent series Tsubasa: Reservoir Chronicle reveals that Yūko is actually on the verge of death, and she is only alive now because her personal time was accidentally frozen long ago by the powerful wizard Clow Reed. As the magic binding her in time begins to dissolve, Yūko's ability to maintain the shop's magical existence fades, and she eventually passes on, telling Watanuki that he will finally be free of his ability to see demons. However, Watanuki chooses to retain his ability to see spirits in order to maintain Yūko's shop and take over her role of shopkeeper. Further cross-over plotlines reveal that Watanuki was born as a result of a wish to turn back time by a shop client, Syaoran of Tsubasa. Since Syaoran was able to go back in time (at the cost of being removed from his timeline and becoming imprisoned by the sorcerer Fei-Wang Reed), Watanuki was born to replace the void in timespace Syaoran left behind, and thus while they are different people, they share an "existence". As the series reaches its conclusion, Syaoran and Watanuki become trapped in a void by Fei-Wang and must pay a price to become free and continue existing. While Syaoran decides to keep traveling through dimensions, never stopping in a single place, Watanuki chooses to stay inside the shop and act as its owner, granting wishes until the day he sees Yūko again. As time progresses, Watanuki continues working in the shop without aging. Dōmeki, his assistant, frequently visits him, and the tradition continues with Dōmeki's descendants. After 100 years pass, Watanuki has a dream of Yūko, who tells him that he has finally become powerful enough to leave the shop. Despite this, he decides to continue waiting inside the shop for the day that they meet again.

== Background ==
xxxHolic was conceived when the group Clamp wanted to link the supernatural and fantasy series they made with a realistic one. This idea was further worked with the creation of the character of Yūko Ichihara who would bridge the stories from xxxHolic and Tsubasa: Reservoir Chronicle. Clamp proposed the idea of writing xxxHolic to Young Magazine after Chobits. In the end they decided to publish both xxxHolic and Tsubasa in weekly magazines to make serialization easier. The manga's title was originally going to be "addicted" but it was changed for the less ambiguous "holic." Like Clamp's previous work Tokyo Babylon, xxxHolic focuses on social pathologies but with a more esoteric tone. The "xxx" before the holic is the Japanese way of saying "fill in the blank." Therefore, the title itself gives a hint about what the series is about. It is talking about people with problems such as being an alcoholic or a workaholic. Being a fantastical series, these "---holics" can have very different pathologies.

The art style of the manga draws on the influence of ukiyo-e wood prints. When making a chapter composed of about twenty pages, Clamp takes around two days to make the artwork, the time differing from the ones from other series they made. The script of the series is made by Nanase Ohkawa, who the other Clamp members consult regarding any confusion they have before starting drawing the chapters. The illustrations and character designs are mainly done by Tsubaki Nekoi with assistance from Mokona, although Satsuki Igarashi also draws various parts. For the series, they decided to use Japanese and Chinese themes, but avoided using tones. Mokona is mainly in charge of designing the female characters, while Nekoi draws the male ones and all the spirits featured. The artwork is also inspired by Alphonse Mucha whom Mokona is a fan of. This leads to all the tankobon covers being gold or silver and then color printed over it. The series was retitled xxxHolic Rō ever since volume 16 because of how Watanuki replaced Yuko as the shop's owner.

When first presenting the idea of running xxxHolic linked with Tsubasa: Reservoir Chronicle, although Ohkawa expressed concerns for the strain the weekly pace of such a series would place on the artists, she whole-heartedly approved. In accordance with Ohkawa's desire for each to have a well-organized story, Clamp avoids putting references between the two stories too frequently. The reasons for linking these two series was because Clamp wanted to have two protagonists from two different manga with different personalities and design, yet during the ending they would be stated to be the same person, and had to go on different paths. Because Tsubasa: Reservoir Chronicle was more focused on action scenes, Clamp sometimes took breaks from xxxHolic or created self-contained stories so that the storyline between the two series would always be linked. In April 2010, Clamp stated that xxxHolic was taking longer than what they expected, causing delays to some of their other works. When the manga finished serialization, Clamp felt it was more the ending from xxxHolic Rō, pointing out that xxxHolic had already ended. Regarding the series' finale, Clamp wanted to express that while Watanuki's decision to stay in the shop may seem sad for readers, for Watanuki it was his happiness. Clamp was satisfied with people's reaction to the last chapter, as when discussing Watanuki's fate, they were also thinking about what happiness is for them.

== Themes ==
Clamp places emphasis on the importance of words when writing the manga. Yuko's dialogues always affect the other characters due to how direct and secure she is when speaking. In early chapters, while she worries a woman addicted to the internet by labeling her husband and child as "other people," Yuko is transmitting the philosophy of individualism and the power her client has. In contrast to Yuko, another client has a tendency to lie which brings her misfortunes.

== Media ==
=== Manga ===
Written and illustrated by Clamp, xxxHolic started in Kodansha's seinen manga magazine Weekly Young Magazine on February 24, 2003. (Note: The series started in the magazine's 13th issue of 2003, released on February 24 of the same year.) The series finished its publication in the magazine on March 20, 2010, and was transferred to Kodansha's shōnen manga magazine Bessatsu Shōnen Magazine on May 8 of the same year; a special 26-page one-shot chapter was also published in Weekly Shōnen Magazine on May 19 of the same year. The series finished on February 9, 2011. Kodansha collected its 213 chapters in 19 tankōbon volumes; the number of chapters for such release was reduced by combining the ones from the original serialization. Starting volume 16, the series is retitled xxxHolic Rō (×××HOLiC ◆ 籠; lit. 'xxxHolic Cage'), but the number of chapters follows the previous ones. The first volume was released on July 25, 2003, and the last one on March 9, 2011.

xxxHolic was one of the first four manga series licensed for English release in North America by Del Rey Manga, and was acquired together with Mobile Suit Gundam SEED, Negima!: Magister Negi Magi, and Tsubasa: Reservoir Chronicle in January 2004. Del Rey published its first volume on April 27, 2004, and on February 21, 2012, the nineteenth and final volume was released. Kodansha USA re-released it in 3-in-1 omnibus format in 2014. The series has also been licensed for an English-language release by Tanoshimi, who released the first nine volumes in the United Kingdom with the first one on August 3, 2006.

A second xxxHolic manga series, titled xxxHolic Rei (XXXHOLiC ◆ 戻; lit. 'xxxHolic Return') was announced at The CLAMP Festival 2012 event. It was scheduled to be published in Weekly Young Magazine in February 2013; however a month's delay in the magazine's issue release dates changed this to March 4, 2013. The series has had various hiatuses; it was published from June 2016 to March 2017 before entering indefinite hiatus. In April 2022, it was announced that Clamp was planning to resume the series in 2023, which did not happen; the series resumed on April 21, 2025. Kodansha released the first tankōbon volume on October 23, 2013. As of November 6, 2026, six volumes have been released.

Kodansha USA announced in July 2013 they licensed the manga for English release, releasing the first volume in 2014.

=== Film ===
Production I.G produced an animated film of the series titled xxxHolic: A Midsummer Night's Dream (×××HOLiC: 真夏ノ夜ノ夢 - xxxHOLiC: Manatsu no Yoru no Yume) which premiered on August 20, 2005, alongside Tsubasa Reservoir Chronicle the Movie: The Princess in the Birdcage Kingdom. The DVD version was released on November 24, 2006. In the film, Yūko receives a request from a woman to help her back into her mansion, which does not allow her to enter. Yūko says that since Watanuki was the one who brought the client to her, he should be the one to grant her wish and therefore is brought along with her and Dōmeki. Yūko also attends because she has been invited to the mansion with many other famous collectors by the same letter, with the mansion filled with strange rooms and mysterious letters telling its guests what to do in place of a host.

The film was selected as a finalist for the Annecy International Animated Film Festival 2006 in the Feature Films category with four other nominees: Asterix and the Vikings, Origin: Spirits of the Past, Wallace & Gromit: The Curse of the Were-Rabbit, and the award winner, Renaissance.

=== Anime television series ===
The anime adaptations of xxxHolic were produced by Production I.G. The first season of the anime television adaptation of xxxHolic was broadcast for 24 episodes on TBS from April 6 to September 28, 2006. Both the film and the anime series are directed by Tsutomu Mizushima. Ageha Ohkawa, Clamp's director and main scriptwriter, served as executive producer and co-served as the series composition writer of the TV series. The second season, xxxHolic: Kei (xxxHOLiC◆継, Horikku: Kei; lit. 'xxxHolic: Sequel'), was broadcast for 13 episodes on TBS from April 3 to June 26, 2008. The main staff and cast remain the same as in the first season. The first season's episodes were also collected in eight DVD volumes published between July 26, 2007, and February 21, 2008, while two DVD boxes were released on August 25, 2010, and October 27, 2010. The second season's episodes were released in seven DVD volumes between June 25, 2008, and December 17, 2008, and a DVD box was released on January 26, 2011.

The first season was licensed by Funimation (later Crunchyroll, LLC) in July 2007. Six DVDs were released from March 25 to October 21, 2008, while a DVD box was released on July 28, 2009. On January 26, 2009, the series made its North American debut on the Funimation Channel.

=== Original video animations ===
A two-DVD original video animation, entitled xxxHOLiC Shunmuki (xxxHOLiC 春夢記; lit. 'xxxHOLiC Spring Dreams Chronicle') was also released by Production I.G. The first DVD for this OVA was released on February 17, 2009, with the 14th volume of the Japanese manga. The second one was released alongside volume 15 on June 26, 2009. Its story focuses on how Haruka Domeki tells Watanuki and Domeki to search for four items, which lead Watanuki to enter into the Dream World. The OVA was rereleased in Blu-ray format alongside the first volume of xxxHolic Rei on October 23, 2013.

Another OVA titled xxxHolic Rō (×××HOLiC・籠; lit. 'xxxHolic Cage') was shipped with the 17th volume of the xxxHolic manga on April 23, 2010. It is set after Yūko's death, and follows Watanuki's life as the new shop's owner. Another OVA titled xxxHolic: Rō Adayume (×××HOLiC・籠 あだゆめ; lit. 'xxxHolic Cage Selfish Dream') was released on March 9, 2011, as included with a special edition of volume 19. In the OVA, Watanuki sees various parts of Domeki's life, including his childhood and the events that happened across the series.

=== Drama ===
On September 7, 2012, it was announced that xxxHolic would be adapted into a television drama, titled CLAMP Drama xxxHOLiC (CLAMPドラマ ホリック〜xxxHOLiC〜, CLAMP Dorama Horriku). Anne Watanabe played the role of Yuko Ichihara, while Shota Sometani played the character Kimihiro Watanuki. The series was directed by Keisuke Toyoshima. The series ran for eight episodes on Wowow from February 24 to April 14, 2013. The opening theme song is "Aitai" (アイタイ), performed by Shikao Suga, while the ending theme song is "You Tell Me", performed by Chay.

=== Live-action film ===
On November 22, 2021, Shochiku and Asmik Ace announced that a live-action film adaptation was in the works for xxxHolic, with Ko Shibasaki and Ryūnosuke Kamiki playing Yuko Ichihara and Kimihiro Watanuki respectively. Mika Ninagawa directed the film, while Erika Yoshida provided the screenplay. The film was released in Japanese theaters on April 29, 2022.

=== Other ===
There were also several other releases in the franchise. A novel titled ×××Holic AnotherHolic Landolt-Ring Aerosol (×××HOLiC アナザーホリック ランドルト環エアロゾル, Horikku Anazāhorikku Randoruto-Kan Earozoru), was written by Nisio Isin and published in Japan on August 1, 2006. It features four stories, with the first one being an adaptation of the series' first chapter. The novel includes original artwork by Clamp. Del Rey published an English translation of xxxHolic: AnotherHolic, released on October 28, 2008.

Several fanbooks have been released in Japan. The first is Gekijōban ×××HOLiC Official Fanbook (劇場版 ×××HOLiC OFFICIAL FANBOOK), released on August 17, 2005. TV Animation ×××HOLiC Extra Official Guide was released on May 17, 2006, and focused on information from the anime adaptation. Another manga guidebook is Shinpan ×××HOLiC Dokuhon (新版 ×××HOLiC読本, "Brand New ×××HOLiC Reading-book"), which was released on November 17, 2006. It was released in English by Del Rey on October 27, 2009, as "The Official xxxHOLiC Guide". On March 17, 2011, Kodansha published another guidebook titled xxxHolic Complete Book (×××HOLiC全書, ×××HOLiC Zensho). Another related book is Soel and Larg: The Adventures of Mokona Modoki (ソエルとラーグ モコナ = モドキの冒険, Soel to Larg: Mokona=Modoki no Bōken), released by Kodansha on July 17, 2004. It is set prior to the events of xxxHolic and Tsubasa and tells the story of the two Mokona Modoki from their creation by Clow Reed and Yūko Ichihara. In January 2013, Kodansha also released a xxxHolic artbook.

An adventure game by Marvelous Entertainment for the PlayStation 2, subtitled Watanuki no Izayoi Sowa (四月一日の十六夜草話, "Watanuki's Sixteen-day-old Moon Grass Story"), was released on August 9, 2007.

Two soundtrack albums were released for the franchise. The first one is xxxHolic: A Midsummer Night's Dream Original Soundtrack, released on August 18, 2005, by Pony Canyon. It contains over twenty tracks from the series' film. The second soundtrack, titled xxxHolic Sound File, was released August 22, 2008, by S.E.N.S. PROJECT. The CD includes thirty-five soundtracks (including a hidden bonus track), many of them from the PlayStation 2 game as well as from the TV series. xxxHolic also makes a crossover with Tsubasa in the drama CD series Private High School Holitsuba (「私立堀鐔学園」, Shiritsu Horitsuba Gakuen), which was released in three volumes.

An all-male stage play of xxxHolic (also known as xxxHOLiC Theater style (演劇調異譚「xxxHOLiC」, Engeki-chō ī Tan Horriku)) began showing on September 17, 2021, in Tokyo. The play is directed by Fumiya Matsuzaki, written by Masafumi Hata, planned by Nanase Ohkawa, and produced by Nelke Planning. The play stars Motohiro Ota and Shōgo Sakamoto as Yūko Ichihara and Kimihiro Watanuki respectively. Due to the success of the initial run, a sequel titled Engeki-chō ī Tan xxxHOLiC -Zoku- (演劇調異譚「xxxHOLiC」-續-) was produced and performed in the spring of 2023, expanding the live-action theatrical franchise.

== Reception ==
=== Sales ===
The series achieved strong sales in Japan, with its thirteenth volume ranking 43rd among the top 50 best-selling manga in the country during 2008. By May 2015, the manga had 13.7 million copies in circulation. By January 2025, it had over 14.5 million copies in circulation.

The series also performed well in North America, where the first volume debuted at sixth place on Nielsen Bookscan's weekly best-seller list for graphic novels. Volume 13 reached the sixth position on the New York Times manga best-seller list following its April 2009 release. According to the New York Times, xxxHolic was the sixth best-selling manga in the United States in 2009. In Mania Entertainment's "Best Manga Awards For 2005", xxxHolic won the "Best Mature" category.

=== Manga ===
The xxxHolic manga series received generally positive reviews from critics. Megan Lavey of Mania Entertainment praised its exploration of human psychology and its comedic elements. She also found the series' narrative ties to Tsubasa: Reservoir Chronicle effective, as they presented events from alternate perspectives and encouraged readers to follow both series. Michael Aronson from Manga Life noted that the series' episodic format gave its introduction promising potential, and described some characters as "gripping". Conversely, Dan Polley, also from Manga Life, considered protagonist Kimihiro Watanuki "a little bit weak to be the lead character". Matthew Alexander of Mania Entertainment offered a contrasting view, stating that Watanuki's character underwent significant development throughout the series, increasing his appeal. Joy Kim from Manga Life praised the series' episodic structure, noting that Watanuki's interactions with other characters imbued every panel "loaded with significance". Carlo Santos of Anime News Network observed that later volumes expanded the narrative into dream sequences, representing a departure from earlier chapters that focused primarily on human-spirit interactions. Active Anime cited the emotional tension and the narrative connection to Tsubasa as key reasons for the series' appeal. Although Matthew Alexander had not read Tsubasa, he considered the incorporation of elements from that series into xxxHolic well-executed, as it gradually revealed connections between the protagonists of both works. Santos, however, found the cross-series continuity confusing, suggesting that only readers familiar with both series could fully grasp certain narrative explanations.

Reviewing the events from volume 15 onward, Holly Ellingwood of Active Anime described them as "tragic, inspiring, and beautifully, breathtakingly sad", praising the revelation of Yuko's fate while expressing uncertainty about the series' future direction. Santos noted that despite the loss of a central character, the series maintained its appeal through Watanuki's subsequent development, characterizing volume 16 as an exploration of recovery after loss. Matthew Alexander offered a more critical assessment, arguing that the series became excessively somber following Yuko's departure, with the reduced comedic elements diminishing its earlier tone. He also noted that Yuko's disappearance and death were insufficiently explained within xxxHolic, requiring readers to consult Tsubasa for clarity.

The artwork received praise for its "striking designs and patterns built into the images", a characteristic associated with Clamp's style, and was described as "equally memorable and evocative". Conversely, some critics found the art less detailed than Tsubasa, noting occasional minimal backgrounds. Michael Aronson, however, argued that the panel composition compensated for this issue. In a review of the first volume of xxxHolic: Rei, Rebecca Silverman awarded a B+ rating, commending the improved narrative flow and artwork, though she noted the plot was "a little too mysterious in places".

=== Anime ===
Critical response to the anime adaptation of xxxHolic was mixed. Casey Brienza of Anime News Network appreciated the first season's fidelity to the source material but criticized certain subtitles in early episodes, recommending the English dub as an alternative. In a broader assessment of the first season, Santos identified animation inconsistencies, including unintentional "super deformed" character proportions, and found certain episodes' storytelling lacking due to trivial subject matter. Ellingwood of Active Anime described the series as "one of the most distinctly imaginative" for its fusion of supernatural elements and comedy, and found the animation issues comedic rather than detrimental. DVD Talk's Todd Douglass Jr. praised the series' thematic content and found the characters engaging due to their development, despite reservations about the episodic structure.

IGN writer Jeff Harris characterized the series' opening as "tolerable" and suggested that fans of action-oriented anime might not find xxxHolic appealing despite its potential. He also noted animation issues similar to those identified by Santos, including a lack of fluidity in certain sequences, and questioned whether the frequent absence of background detail was an artistic choice or a cost-saving measure. Chris Beveridge of Mania offered a mixed assessment of the animation, acknowledging the issues raised by other critics while still finding the overall visual design appealing. He praised the episodic format and the series' ability to balance lighthearted and darker story elements.
