= XxxHolic (film) =

2022 film by Mika Ninagawa

xxxHolic
- Theatrical teaser poster
- Japanese: ホリック xxxHOLiC
- Revised Hepburn: Horikku
- Directed by: Mika Ninagawa
- Screenplay by: Erika Yoshida
- Based on: xxxHolic by CLAMP
- Produced by: Fumitsugu Ikeda; Mitsuru Uda
- Starring: Ko Shibasaki; Ryūnosuke Kamiki; Hokuto Matsumura; Tina Tamashiro
- Cinematography: Daisuke Sōma
- Edited by: Yoshiyuki Koike
- Music by: Keiichirō Shibuya
- Distributed by: Shochiku Co., Ltd.; Asmik Ace
- Release date: April 29, 2022
- Running time: 110 minutes
- Country: Japan
- Language: Japanese

xxxHolic (Japanese: ホリック xxxHOLiC, Hepburn: Horikku) is a 2022 Japanese supernatural dark fantasy drama film directed by Mika Ninagawa and written by Erika Yoshida based on the manga series of the same name by manga artist group CLAMP. Co-distributed by Shochiku and Asmik Ace, the film marks the first live-action film adaptation for the xxxHolic franchise, and the second film following xxxHolic: A Midsummer Night's Dream (2005). The film stars Ko Shibasaki as Yuko Ichihara and Ryūnosuke Kamiki as Kimihiro Watanuki, alongside Hokuto Matsumura and Tina Tamashiro. It was released in Japan on April 29, 2022.

== Premise ==
Kimihiro Watanuki, a boy who is plagued by ayakashi spirits, stumbles upon a shop that grants wishes. He meets the owner, Yuko Ichihara, a mysterious witch of many names and esoteric renown. She offers to grant his wish to be rid of the spirits, but for a price – he must become Yuko's part-time cook and housekeeper. Meanwhile, Watanuki connects with his classmates, Dōmeki and Himawari, and is involved in a big mysterious incident.

== Cast ==
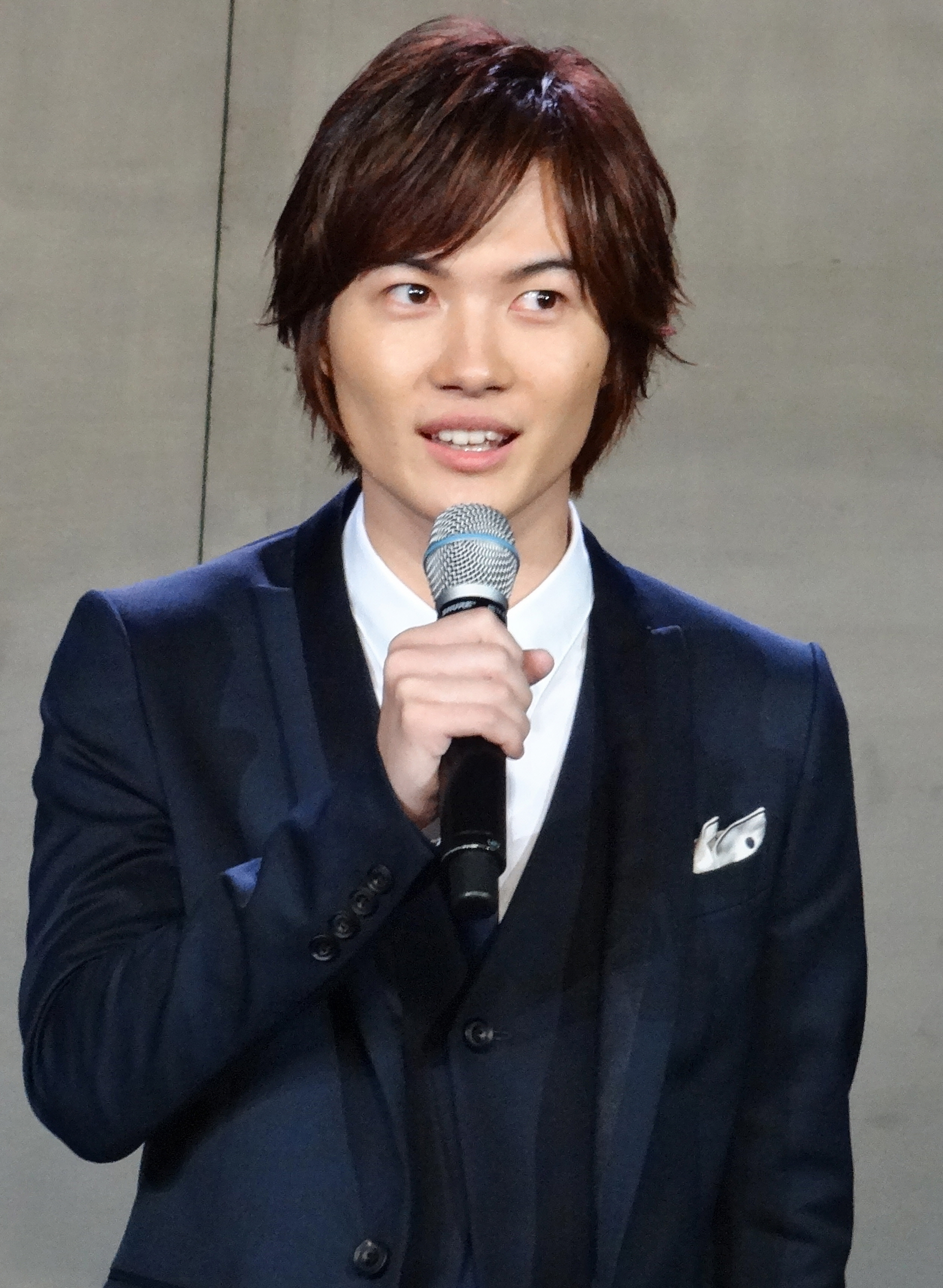
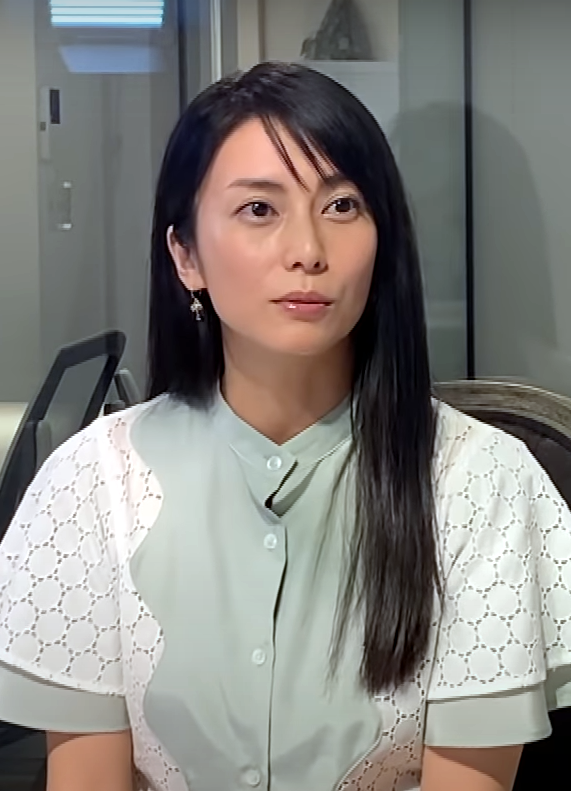
Ryūnosuke Kamiki portrays Watanuki while Ko Shibasaki plays Yuko in the live-action film.
- Ko Shibasaki as Yuko Ichihara, a shop owner that grants people's wishes.
- Ryūnosuke Kamiki as Kimihiro Watanuki, a teenage boy that can see and is plagued by ayakashi.
- Hokuto Matsumura as Shizuka Dōmeki, Kimihiro's classmate that lives in a shrine.
- Tina Tamashiro as Himawari Kunogi, Kimihiro's classmate and love interest.
- Daoko and Serena Motola as Maru and Moro, two artificial beings in Yuko's shop.
- Nanase Nishino as Nekomusume, a humanoid girl with a characteristics of a cat.
- Ai Hashimoto as Zashiki-warashi, a spirit girl who lives in a mountain with pure spiritual energy.
- Riho Yoshioka as Jōrogumo, a yokai that is linked to spiders.
- Hayato Isomura as Akagumo, a subordinate of Jōrogumo who is infatuated with her.

Other cast members include Shuri and Sakurako Ōhara as Misaki and Guest #2, Yuko's clients that are possessed by ayakashi.

== Production ==
=== Development ===
In November 2021, Shochiku and Asmik Ace announced that a live-action film adaptation of CLAMP's xxxHolic manga series was in the works, with Mika Ninagawa directing the film, and Erika Yoshida providing the screenplay.

The idea to make a movie about xxxHolic came to director Mika Ninagawa in 2012 while she was still shooting her second movie, Helter Skelter. At first, it was going to be her third xxxHolic was one of the candidates. Ninagawa then called the producer out of the blue on January 4, 2013, and announced that she wanted to shoot a movie about xxxHolic. Ninagawa herself is a fan of the manga, she wanted to do a film that would bring the best Asia, including Japan. She is a well-known photographer across Asia and she thought xxxHolic visually represented both Asia and Japan. The team wanted to do something contemporary that they could show to their children. The producer contacted Kodansha the next business day to talk about the movie, and they all went to Kyoto and had dinner with CLAMP to discuss it.

Deciding which parts and stories from the 19 volumes would make it to the movie was difficult and it took a long time to come up with a script that would please everybody. For that reason, two other movies came out first and xxxHolic became Ninagawa's fifth work, instead of third. The team wanted to convey to the world the importance of recognizing diversity, rather than just separating 'good' and 'evil', defeating the enemy and feeling satisfied. Meanwhile, as Yuko is called dimensional witch, the nickname was changed since the movie does not reference other CLAMP works.

=== Casting ===
In November 2021, actress and singer Ko Shibasaki and actor Ryūnosuke Kamiki was cast to portray Yuko Ichihara and Kimihiro Watanuki respectively. The following month, SixTONES idol group member Hokuto Matsumura and actress Tina Tamashiro was announced to portray Shizuka Dōmeki and Himawari Kunogi respectively., with singer and rapper Daoko and actress Serena Motola being cast as Maru and Moro weeks later. In February 2022, actress Shuri, Nanase Nishino and Sakurako Ōhara were cast as Misaki, Nekomusume and possessed guest respectively. That same month, Riho Yoshioka was cast as Jōrogumo, while Hayato Isomura was cast as Akagumo, an original character for the film. Shooting was postponed due to the COVID-19 pandemic and that became a turning point in deciding how the story climax would become. That's when "tolerance" became a thematic that would be explored in the movie. The original character, Akagumo, was created with the purpose to explain the story to the audience. Katsurada recognizes that this is useful for storytelling and understood and approved this original character. They think CLAMP did too because of the drawing they did. The casting had a lot of Ninagawa's influence. The producer would suggest a few names but she would reply "that's not what I had in mind", because she is a fan of the original manga.

=== Filming ===
Director Ninagawa stated that filming was completed in November 2021.

=== Music ===
Keiichirō Shibuya will compose the music for the film. The theme song for the film is titled "Habit", performed by J-pop band Sekai no Owari.

== Release ==
The film was released in theaters in Japan on April 29, 2022.

== Reception ==
=== Box office ===
The film ranked number 5 out of top 10 in the Japanese box office on its opening weekend.

=== Critical reception ===
Dale Roll of SoraNews24 gave the film a mixed review, as she praised the costume designs and visuals, but felt the story was poorly executed. Mark Schilling of The Japan Times also gave the film a mixed review.
