= List of xxxHolic characters =

Promotional image of the series featuring Yūko at the top left, Kohane below, Domeki in the middle at the top, Himawari below and Watanuki in the right at the bottom.

The fictional characters appearing in the manga and anime series xxxHolic were developed by Clamp, a group of four manga artists. The series takes place in modern Japan and focuses on various supernatural themes, with most of the main characters being humans with magical powers, supernatural creatures, or spirits. Published concurrently with Clamp's Tsubasa: Reservoir Chronicle manga, the two manga's plotlines and character cross over.

The series' protagonist is Kimihiro Watanuki, a high school student plagued by yōkai and ayakashi spirits. One day, when running away from the spirits, he accidentally enters the shop of witch Yūko Ichihara, who has the power to grant wishes for a price. Yūko decides to grant his wish of making his demons go away in exchange for having him work as her assistant in her shop. Working at Yūko's shop, Watanuki encounters various spirits and also gets to know his classmates Shizuka Dōmeki and Himawari Kunogi better. Although Watanuki comes to value his new life at the shop, he begins to worry about Yūko and eventually promises that he will try to grant her wish, should she have one.

The characters from xxxHolic were designed by Clamp's members Mokona and Tsubaki Nekoi. Some of their designs were inspired by ukiyo-e art style. The series' characters' interactions and personalities, as well as the designs, have been met with positive critical reception. On the other hand, the designs featured in the animated adaptations have received mixed reviews.

== Creation and style ==
The artwork of xxxHolic is influenced by the Ukiyo-e art style. A notable theme of the work, which recurs in other Clamp works, is the use of one-eyed or blind characters to express a feeling of loneliness and perhaps parallel Nanase Ohkawa's own poor right-eye vision. Likewise, in xxxHolic's crossover series, Tsubasa: Reservoir Chronicle, the loss of eyesight is also a theme, and Tsubasa includes artwork influenced by Ukiyo-e.

The series' female characters are designed by Mokona, while Tsubaki Nekoi draws the males and spirits. The characters were named so that different people would find different meanings in them.

== Main characters ==
=== Kimihiro Watanuki ===
Kimihiro Watanuki (四月一日 君尋, Watanuki Kimihiro) is a high school student plagued by his ability to see spirits. One day he stumbles, seemingly by chance, upon the wish-granting shop of Yūko Ichihara. She promises to remove his ability to see spirits if he works part-time in her shop until his work equals the worth of his wish. Since he lives by himself, he is experienced in cooking and cleaning, much to Yūko's pleasure. Besides doing domestic tasks for Yūko, Watanuki also often completes jobs of a spiritual or magical nature. Watanuki is voiced by Jun Fukuyama in Japanese and Todd Haberkorn in English. Shota Sometani plays Watanuki in the live action TV series and Kamiki Ryunosuke plays Watanuki in the live action movie.

=== Yūko Ichihara ===
Yūko Ichihara (壱原 侑子, Ichihara Yūko) is a witch who runs a shop that grants wishes to customers in exchange for something of equal value to the wish. Yūko takes anything from precious objects to abstract concepts, such as love or luck, in exchange. She is usually free-spirited and somewhat immature, drinking constantly, typically seen smoking a kiseru and forcing difficult tasks upon Watanuki. However, when giving customers or Watanuki advice, she is much more stern and offers cryptic messages that serve as warnings of impending danger. She constantly speaks of inevitability ("hitsuzen") and how nothing is a coincidence. Yūko is voiced by Sayaka Ohara in Japanese and Colleen Clinkenbeard in English. The actress and model Anne Watanabe plays the role of Yūko in the live action TV series and Shibasaki Kou in the live action movie.

=== Shizuka Dōmeki ===
Shizuka Dōmeki (百目鬼 静, Dōmeki Shizuka) is a schoolmate of Watanuki. He lives in a shrine owned by his late grandfather Haruka Dōmeki, a Shinto priest who taught Shizuka about folklore and Shinto practices during his childhood. However, despite his heritage, Dōmeki does not have the ability to see ghosts or spirits, though he can sense them and has a natural ability to exorcise them. He is part of the school's kyūdō club and excels in school competitions. Dōmeki barely speaks unless explaining folklore or asking Watanuki for meals. Dōmeki is voiced by Kazuya Nakai in Japanese and J. Michael Tatum in English.

Despite Watanuki's initial dislike for him, Yūko often makes Dōmeki join Watanuki in his jobs as his ability to exorcise spirits negates Watanuki's ability to attract them. Utilizing Yūko's shop, Watanuki gives Domeki half of his eye after he loses his right eye's vision to the spirits, which allows Dōmeki to see and experience what Watanuki goes through. He also gives Watanuki a large amount of his blood, which, according to Yūko, causes their personalities to change. Yūko gives Domeki a magic egg obtained by Sakura while working for her; however, Dōmeki does not know what it does or when he should use it.

Four years after Yūko's death, Dōmeki is a university student studying ancient history. He often visits Watanuki in the shop. Because Watanuki cannot leave the shop, Dōmeki provides assistance both with Watanuki's work and by providing essentials, such as food. After six more years, Dōmeki graduates and has become an assistant to one of his professors at the university. In the xxxHolic Rō Adayume OVA it is revealed that Dōmeki is engaged to Kohane Tsuyuri, having delivered his wedding's invitation to Watanuki. After more than one hundred years have passed since Watanuki inherited the shop, Dōmeki's great-grandson is Watanuki's new assistant and still possesses the egg Yūko gave to his great-grandfather. Masahiro Higashide plays Dōmeki in the live action TV series and Hokuto Matsumura plays Domeki in the live action movie.

=== Himawari Kunogi ===
Himawari Kunogi (九軒 ひまわり, Kunogi Himawari) is Watanuki's love interest and classmate. She is very cheerful and friendly around Watanuki and Dōmeki. However, though Watanuki is very open in showing his feelings and admiration for her, she appears oblivious to the fact that he likes her. Watanuki often invites her to join him for various outings, but Himawari usually has some prior engagement, which comically and inadvertently leaves Watanuki alone with Dōmeki. Himawari is voiced by Shizuka Itō in Japanese and Cherami Leigh in English.

Watanuki originally believes that she is his "goddess of good luck", though Yūko seems to think otherwise, often dropping cryptic hints about Himawari's true nature. It is eventually revealed that Himawari emanates misfortune that affects everyone around her except her parents and those with spiritual abilities, such as Dōmeki and Yūko. Her bad luck causes Watanuki to fall from a second story window and nearly die as a result of the fall and shattered glass. Yūko has them rush Watanuki to her shop, where they manage to save his life. Himawari offers to take on any physical scars Watanuki would have received from the accident as a payment for keeping him alive. After revealing this to Watanuki, she attempts to cut all connections with him. Watanuki, however, tells her that he is truly happy around her no matter what and refuses to stop seeing her. He later gives her a small bird he names Tanpopo (タンポポ; lit. 'Dandelion') that is immune to her bad luck. The small bird comes from an egg that was retrieved by Sakura from an alternate Tokyo in Tsubasa: Reservoir Chronicle. After Watanuki tells Himawari that he loves her and is glad to have met her, Himawari begins to develop feelings for him.

She is the only main character not shown visiting Watanuki after he inherits the shop; she attends a university far away from the shop, and because her natural misfortune causes problems with the shop's magic, she promises only to enter the shop on Watanuki's birthday, though she calls occasionally. Himawari ends up marrying a businessman whose identity is unknown. She was played by Karen Miyazaki in the xxxHolic TV drama and Tina Tamashiro in the live action movie.

=== Kohane Tsuyuri ===
Kohane Tsuyuri (五月七日小羽, Tsuyuri Kohane) is a young girl who has been featured on many paranormal TV shows as a child prodigy, medium and exorcist. After first developing her powers, she helped her mother learn that her father was having an affair, which caused her mother's personality to drastically change. As a result, her mother refuses to touch her, refer to her by name, or socialize with others; she also takes away any objects or food not considered "pure". She tries to get Kohane onto as many TV shows as possible, and uses the earnings to buy extravagant material possessions. Nevertheless, Kohane thinks that her mother's behavior is her fault for developing supernatural powers. Due to her family life, Kohane is quiet and lonely, though she attempts to stay strong for her mother's sake and takes the blame for the family's problems. Kohane is voiced by Rina Hidaka.

She eventually meets Watanuki and forms a bond with him. Despite protests from Kohane's mother, Watanuki continues to contact her and make her happy. It is later revealed that Kohane's powers of exorcism developed from one of Sakura's magical feathers, though her ability to see spirits is natural. She asks Yūko to grant her happiness, which Yūko does by fixing the various external problems in her life, such as her reputation, in exchange for her exorcism ability. However, Yūko cannot fix her issues with her mother, as a person's true character can only be changed by their own will. Four years after Yūko's death, Kohane is a student at Tsuji Academy and often visits Watanuki in his shop. She continues to live with the grandmother fortune teller. After six years, she is a student of folklore at the same university as Dōmeki. In the xxxHolic Rō Adayume OVA it is revealed that Kohane is engaged with Dōmeki, who states that even so, Watanuki is Kohane's most important person.

== Secondary characters ==
=== Zashiki-warashi ===
Zashiki-warashi (座敷童; lit. 'Vestal Sprite') is a spirit girl who lives on a mountain with pure spiritual energy. She is very shy and prone to crying, which causes her tiny Karasu-Tengu Guardians to defend her. Ironically, the guardians will come to her aid even if she weeps tears of joy. Zashiki-warashi develops a crush on Kimihiro Watanuki as his endeavors become known among spirits, and she first meets him when she accidentally steals Shizuka Dōmeki's soul while attempting to get a good Valentine's Day gift for Watanuki. He later sees her while giving her a White Day present, while restoring the pipe fox spirit to his smaller form. Watanuki later rescues her from Lady Jorōgumo, who captures her after a failed attempt to recover Watanuki's eye, and she appears again briefly with her friend, Ame-warashi, after Watanuki recovers from a near death experience. In xxxHolic Rei, she has gone missing, unwilling to meet Watanuki with the other spirits fearing she might be corrupted. Zashiki-warashi is voiced by Sumi Mutoh in Japanese and Brina Palencia in English. Zashiki-warashi is played by Ai Hashimoto in the movie.

=== Ame-warashi ===
Ame-warashi (雨童女; lit. 'Rain Sprite') is a high-ranking rain spirit who has a very hostile attitude toward humans due to the fact that "humans have no care or regard whatsoever with living nature". She is somewhat close and protective of Zashiki-warashi and often teases Watanuki despite him helping to fulfill her request. She owned the creature Kudagitsune, which later becomes Watanuki's guardian. She gives it to Yūko Ichihara as a compensation for fulfilling her wish to revive the sick hydrangea. In xxxHolic Rei, she appears worried about Zashiki-warashi's health and is willing to pay any price to Watanuki to save her. Ame-warashi is voiced by Akiko Yajima in Japanese and Kate Oxley in English. Ame-warashi is played by Aoi Morikawa.

=== Kudagitsune ===
Kudagitsune (管狐; lit. 'Pipe Fox'), later named Mugetsu (無月; lit. 'moonless" or "no moon') by Watanuki, is a tube fox spirit given to Yūko as payment by Ame-warashi for Watanuki's help. It quickly becomes attached to Watanuki, and protects him during dangerous situations. It is generally a small snake-like being with a fox's head, but it can transform into a traditional nine-tailed fox when it reveals its true power. It is able to create "Foxfire" in the form of large fireballs, and it can detect evil spirits. It takes a large amount of pure spiritual energy to revert it to its initial form.

=== Jorōgumo ===
Jorōgumo (Japanese Kanji: 絡新婦, Hiragana: じょろうぐも) is a type of Yōkai who is linked with the spiders that capture a part of Watanuki's eyes. She captures Zashiki-warashi in an attempt to take the eye. In xxxHolic Ro Lady Jorōgumo comes to the shop as a client who wishes Watanuki to find her a carmesi pearl, which Watanuki has thanks to Ningyo. Jorogumo is mentioned again in xxxHolic Rei by Ningyo who gives Watanuki a shamisen following an interaction with the Jorogumo. Jorogumo is played by Riho Yoshioka in the movie.

=== Maru and Moro ===
Maru (マル) and Moro (モロ), whose respective real names are Marudashi (マルダシ; "Completely Exposed") and Morodashi (モロダシ; "Completely Exposed"), are two artificial beings that keep Yūko's shop in existence. They are energetic and often speak in unison and repeat the words of others. They cannot leave the shop, as they have no souls. They help Yūko around the shop most of the time, but often go into long periods of hibernation due to the difficulty of keeping the shop in existence. Yūko uses the last bit of her power to revive Maru and Moro and send them back to the shop. After Watanuki becomes the new shop's owner, Maru and Moro become his assistants. Later it is shown that they have developed a very close bond with Watanuki, similar to the one they had with Yūko. Maru is voiced by Kazuko Kojima in Japanese and Leah Clark in English. Played by Ririka Kawashima in the drama series and Daoko in the movie. Moro is voiced by Hisayo Mochizuki in Japanese and Brina Palencia in English. Played by Tsumugi Hatakeyama in the drama series and Serena Motola in the movie.

=== Mokona Modoki ===
Mokona Modoki (モコナ＝モドキ; Lit. Mokona Imitation or Mock Mokona) refers to a pair of two rabbit-like creatures created by Yūko and Clow Reed in preparation for the events in Tsubasa: Reservoir Chronicle and xxxHolic. The white Mokona travels with Syaoran's group, while the black Mokona stays in Yūko's shop. Both are based upon the original Mokona of Magic Knight Rayearth, whom Yūko and Clow encountered while Mokona was traveling through different worlds. Mokona provided Yūko and Clow with the knowledge of alternate dimensions.

The black Mokona, whose real name is Larg (ラーグ, Rāgu), acts as a liaison between the Tsubasa: Reservoir Chronicle protagonists and Yūko. Mokona likes to be around Yūko, who treats Mokona as a "drinking buddy." He also likes to be around Watanuki and play with Maru and Moro. While allowing the two groups to speak, Mokona can also teleport and receive items from the white Mokona by swallowing them. Like the white Mokona, he has a single earring. It is a blue gem made by Clow Reed and has the ability to seal magical power, and it also holds Sakura's memories of Syaoran and Watanuki's memory of his past. Mokona is voiced by Mika Kikuchi in Japanese and Carrie Savage in English.

=== Haruka Dōmeki ===
Haruka Dōmeki (百目鬼 遥, Dōmeki Haruka) is the deceased grandfather of Dōmeki, and a former Shinto priest who taught Shizuka Dōmeki many of his practices. He has the ability to destroy evil spirits and cross into dreams, and often appears to Watanuki's dream, taking on the appearance of a teenager. As a teenager, he looks exactly like Dōmeki, though he has a somewhat more cheerful and outgoing personality than his grandson, and he is always smoking. He acts like a guide to Watanuki as Yūko does, often giving him advice, telling him about Dōmeki, and helping him work out problems. Before her death, Yūko visits Haruka in a dream requesting that he keep protecting Watanuki. In the xxxHolic Rō Adayume OVA, Haruka becomes Watanuki's client as he wants him to free Dōmeki from nightmares. Haruka is voiced by Kazuya Nakai.

=== Syaoran ===
Syaoran (小狼, Shaoran) refers to two identical teenagers who appear across the series. The first one is from a parallel dimension and visits Yūko's shop to help him save his childhood friend Sakura. He gains the ability to travel across dimension with the white Mokona in order to recover the memories Sakura lost and remains in contact with Yūko. The second Syaoran shortly visits Yūko, as he is sent to another world. While Watanuki does not know him, Syaoran paid a price to save Watanuki from dying after being affected by Himawari's bad luck, and constantly he can hear him yelling him not to die. It is later revealed that the second Syaoran was responsible for creating Watanuki when he wished turn back time, but at the price of losing his freedom to the sorcerer Fei-Wang Reed. Watanuki was used to replace Syaoran in his world, sharing the same parents, but forgot all of this, when he paid Yūko with his memories to locate Fei-Wang. Watanuki later learns of their relationship in the ending of Tsubasa when both are imprisoned by Fei-Wang's curse. To free each other Syaoran has to travel across dimensions forever. Both Syaorans are voiced by Miyu Irino.

=== Sakura ===
Sakura (サクラ) comes from another dimension in a catatonic state while under the care of the teenager Syaoran. As Sakura is about to die due to losing her soul, Syaoran goes on a search across dimension to save her. However, the usage of the white Mokona Modoki to travel across dimension requires Sakura to pay to Yūko with all her memories regarding Syaoran, her most important person. As the series continues, Sakura recovers and gives Yūko an egg as part of a job which then becomes two and are given to Watanuki and Domeki. Her soul is later separated from her body and appears in the Dream World where she meets Watanuki. Befriending him, Sakura finds Watanuki similar to the other Syaoran, and later disappears from the Dream World. She is voiced by Yui Makino.

=== Shikao Suga ===
Shikao Suga (スガ シカオ, Suga Shikao) is a real life singer who has performed multiple themes for the adaptations of the xxxHolic anime. He appears in a small chapter, xxxHolic Shi where he requests Watanuki the wish of becoming more famous. However, Watanuki finds it strange stating that while he is already famous in real life for his achievements, the wish would make him unable to write and sing more songs. In December 2015, Clamp collaborated with Victor Entertainment to create a music video involving a theme by Suga, a singer who performed multiple themes for the xxxHolic animated adaptations. Clamp drew Watanuki and Yūko, who feature in the video alongside Suga.

=== Akagumo ===
Akagumo is a character featured in the 2022 live-action adaptation of xxxHolic. He appears as a subordinate from the Jorōgumo. He is played by Hayato Isomura. Director Mika Ninagawa claimed it was difficult to include Akagumo in the movie because of the expectations of having a new character prominent in the narrative.

== Reception ==
The characters from xxxHolic have been well received by publications from manga and anime. Although Watanuki's character was initially seen "a little bit weak to be the lead character", his interactions with other characters and his development across the series has been praised. Todd Douglass Jr. from DVD Talk agreed, focusing in the characters in general and how they were developed across the anime. The emotional focus on the series has also been well-received due to its comedy and the way characters deal supernatural elements. Yuko has also been called the "star performer" from the series, and her death has received mixed feelings; although writers found events following her death to lack the main characters' comedy, the way Watanuki dealt with her role was enjoyed. The connections between the characters from xxxHolic and Tsubasa: Reservoir Chronicle has also received positive comments as how in both series, an important connection between two characters from the two series is hinted. However, the lack of reading the other series would confuse the readers or it would persuade them to read the other series.

The manga's character designs have been labelled as "striking". Carlo Santos of Anime News Network praised the artwork. Critics have found issues with anime's character designs due to how the limbs were extended in most episodes, leading to superdeformed. Nevertheless, such designs have been found comical with every character still noted to be distinctive. The voice casting for the English release of the series has been found remarkable with comments focused on the work from Colleen Clinkenbeard as Yuko and Todd Haberkorn as Watanuki; although the former was enjoyed, the latter received mixed responses.
