= Reki-jo =

Otaku sub-group for Japanese female history buffs

Reki-jo (歴女) are Japanese female history buffs, who may also use the speech and mannerisms of pre-industrial Japan in their social gatherings. Reki-jo are a kind of otaku, people obsessed with a particular interest. Economic activity relating to the fad generated US$725 million per year as of 2010.

== Etymology ==
Reki-jo is a contraction of "girls who like history", more literally "history-loving girls" (歴史好きの女子, rekishi-zuki no joshi).

== Persons of interest ==
The Shinsengumi are a common interest of reki-jo. Other historical figures commonly of interest to reki-jo include:

- Date Masamune
- Sanada Yukimura
- Ishida Mitsunari
- Naoe Kanetsugu
- Sakamoto Ryōma
- Iwamoto Tetsuzō.

== Notable reki-jo ==
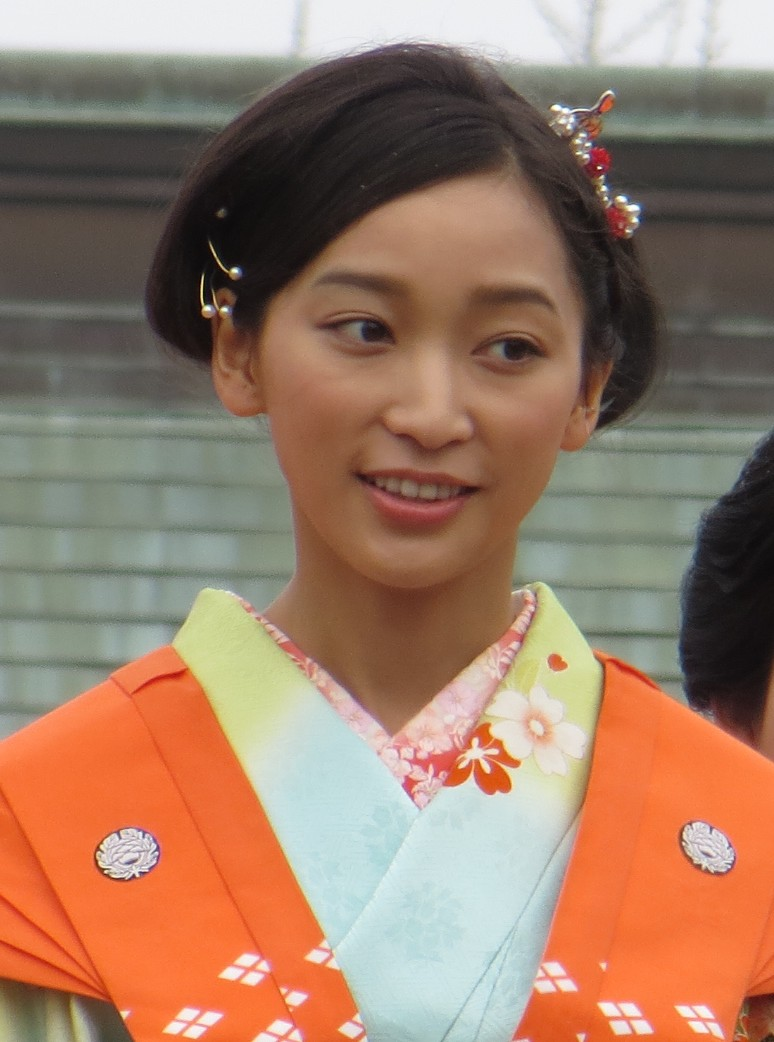
Anne Watanabe

Model Anne Watanabe, daughter of actor Ken Watanabe, is a notable reki-jo.

The manga and anime character Rika Yoshitake (吉武 莉華, Yoshitake Rika) from the Genshiken franchise is an example of a reki-jo in popular fiction.

In the series Girls und Panzer, the Hippo Team is made up of Ooarai Girls High School's reki-jo clique.

== See also ==
- Anime and manga fandom
- Cosplay
- Sengoku Basara
