= 2025 World Jigsaw Puzzle Championship =

5th World Jigsaw Puzzle Championships

The 2025 World Jigsaw Puzzle Championship is the fifth edition of the World Jigsaw Puzzle Championships organized by the World Jigsaw Puzzle Federation (WJPF). It was held between 15 and 21 September in Valladolid, Spain.

== Events and rules ==
The Championship included the 3 classical events: individual, pairs, and team. Each event had classifications rounds and a grand final. And this time also an Organizations WJPF Team Competition and a Guinness World Record attempt will be held.

=== Individual event ===
First round (6 groups): Each individual participant makes a jigsaw puzzles of 500 pieces in the maximum period of 90 minutes. The fastest 85 participants in order of classification of each group move onto the semifinals. Of all the countries that have not achieved any representatives in the second round, the participant from each of those countries (up to 15) that has achieved the best position in the first round will advance to the next round.

Semifinals (3 groups): Each participant makes a jigsaw puzzles of 500 pieces in the maximum period of 75 minutes. The fastest 60 participant of each grupo in order of classification move into the final.

Final (180 participants): Each participant makes a jigsaw puzzles of 500 pieces in the maximum period of 75 minutes and the fastest one to finish it is the world champion.

=== Pairs event ===
First Round (4 groups): Each pair makes a jigsaw puzzles of 500 pieces in the maximum period of 75 minutes. The fastest 85 pairs from each group in order of classification move onto the semifinals. Of all the countries that have not achieved any representatives in the second round, the participant from each of those countries (up to 20) that has achieved the best position in the first round will advance to the next round.

Semifinal (2 groups): Each pair makes a jigsaw puzzles of 500 pieces in the maximum period of 60 minutes. The fastest 50 pairs from each group in order of classification move onto the finals.

Final (100 pairs): Each pair makes a jigsaw puzzles of 1000 pieces in the maximum period of 120 minutes and the fastest pair to finish it win the competition.

=== Team event ===
Classification round (4 groups) Teams of 4 members make 2 jigsaw puzzles of 1000 pieces in a maximum period of 3 hours. Best 25 team of each group in order of classification are qualificated to the final. Of all the participating teams from non-qualified countries, the best position team from each country will advance to the final, up to a maximum of 5 countries

Final (105 teams) Teams of 4 members make 2 jigsaw puzzles of 1000 pieces in a maximum period of 3 hours. The fastest team to finish them is the champion. The team must complete one puzzle before starting the other.

== Schedule ==
Event schedule
Monday, 15 September 2025
12h	Opening Ceremony	
13h	World Record attempt	
18h	Organizations WJPF Competition	
Tuesday, 16 September 2025
16h	Individual	Group A
18h	Individual	Group B
20h	Individual	Group C
Wednesday, 17 September 2025
09h	Individual	Group A
11h	Individual	Group B
13h	Individual	Group C
16h	Individual	Semifinal 1
17:45h	Individual	Semifinal 2
19:30h	Individual	Semifinal 3
Thursday, 18 September 2025
9h	Pairs	Group A
10:45h	Pairs	Group B
12:30h	Pairs	Group C
16:30h	Pairs	Group D
18:30h	Pairs	Semifinal 1
20h	Pairs	Semifinal 2
Friday, 19 September 2025
9h	Teams	Group A
12:30h	Teams	Group B
16h	Teams	Group C
Saturday, 20 September 2025
11h	Team	Group D
12:30h	Team	Group C
16h	Pairs	Final
18:45h	Individual	Final
Sunday, 21 September 2025
10h	Team	Final
14h	Award Ceremony	Closing Ceremony

== Results ==
Event	Gold		Silver		Bronze	
Individual	(Poland) Weronika Huptas	00:39:44	(Poland) Wiktor Kacprzak	00:40:20	(Germany) Katharina Reiner	00:40:25
Pairs	(Poland) Weronika Huptas (Poland) Anna Kazana	00:54:45	(Germany) Katharina Reiner (Italy) Chiara Dellantonio	00:55:22	(Netherlands) Ellen Sinot (Netherlands) Inge Sinot	00:57:42
Team	Euro Jigsaw Jacks Squad; Chiara Dellantonio; Katharina Reiner; Hanna Lehikoinen; Wiktor Kacprzak	01:16:04	(Czech Republic) Czech Puzzlequeens; Tereza Koptíková; Markéta Freislerová; Kateřina Klinková; Jana Ondroušková	01:17:40	(Netherlands) O'S and A's; Ellen Sinot; Inge Sinot; Sien Braat; Teun Braat	01:20:30

== Medal table ==
Rank	Nation	Gold	Silver	Bronze	Total
1	Poland	2	1	0	3
2	Czech Republic	0	1	0	1
3	Netherlands	0	0	2	2
4	Germany	0	0	1	1
Totals (4 entries)		2	2	3	7

Note: Some medals was taken by pairs/teams competing as mixed without national flag.

== Participants ==
65 countries were scheduled to be represented at the fourth World Puzzle Championships.

- Argentina
- Australia
- Austria
- Belarus
- Belgium
- Brazil
- Bulgaria
- Cameroon
- Canada
- Chile
- China
- Colombia
- Costa Rica
- Croatia
- Cuba
- Czech Republic
- Denmark
- Dominica
- Egypt
- Estonia
- Finland
- France
- Germany
- (United Kingdom) Great Britain
- Greece
- Guatemala
- Hungary
- India
- Indonesia
- (Republic of Ireland) Ireland
- Iceland
- International Puzzlers (Russian nationals competing personally)
- Israel
- Italy
- Japan
- Latvia
- Lithuania
- Luxembourg
- Malaysia
- Mexico
- Morocco (debut)
- Netherlands
- New Zealand
- Norway
- Panama
- Peru
- Poland
- Portugal
- Romania
- Saudi Arabia
- Serbia
- Singapore
- Slovenia
- Slovakia
- South Africa
- Spain
- Sweden
- Switzerland
- Chinese Taipei (debut)
- Thailand
- Turkey
- Ukraine
- Uruguay
- United States
- Venezuela
