= 2019 World Jigsaw Puzzle Championship =

Puzzle competition

The 2019 World Jigsaw Puzzle Championship is the first edition of the World Jigsaw Puzzle Championships competition organized by the World Jigsaw Puzzle Federation (WJPF). It was held between 28 and 29 September in Valladolid, Spain.

== Organisation ==
The venue for this first World Jigsaw Puzzle Championship was the Cúpula del Milenio.

The Championship included three events: team, pairs, and individual.

For the Team event, teams of 4 members (also 1 reserve is allowed) make 4 jigsaw puzzles (2 puzzles of 1000 pieces and 2 puzzles of 1500 pieces) in a maximum period of 8 hours, and the fastest team to finish them is the champion. The four members have to do one puzzle and when they finished it they can start the next puzzle.

For the Pairs event, 2 members make a jigsaw puzzles of 500 pieces in the maximum period of 90 minutes, and the fastest pair to finish it win the competition.

For the Individual event, each individual participant make a jigsaw puzzles of 500 pieces in the maximum period of 2 hours, and the fastest to finish it is the champion.

== Results ==
Event	Gold		Silver		Bronze	
Team	(Russia) Siberian Team Irina Batalova; Valentina Baburchenkova; Natalia Komarova; Galina Medvedeva; Marina Radchenko	04h 11' 17"	(Czech Republic) Czech Dragons Jana Hanzelková; Katerina Novotna; Luisa Uhlařová; Radka Pečinková	04h 20' 42"	Russia Stella-Puzzler.su Dmitry Makarenko; Irina Akopova; Olga Popova; Ekaterina Mishanina	04h 29' 45"
Pairs	(Spain) Demelza Becerra (Spain) Ángel Heras	34' 34"	(Czech Republic) Jana Hanzelková (Czech Republic) Kateřina Novotná	35' 13"	(Russia) Irina Batalova (Russia) Natalia Komarova	36' 40"
Individual	(Czech Republic) Jana Hanzelková	46' 35"	(Poland) Mariusz Ślizewski	52' 25"	(Czech Republic) Kateřina Novotná	52' 50"

== Medal table ==
Rank	Nation	Gold	Silver	Bronze	Total
1	Czech Republic	1	2	1	4
2	Russia	1	0	2	3
3	Spain	1	0	0	1
4	Poland	0	1	0	1
Totals (4 entries)		3	3	3	9

== Participants ==
39 countries are represented in the first World Jigsaw Puzzle Championship.

- Andorra
- Argentina
- Australia
- Belarus
- Belgium
- Brazil
- Bulgaria
- Canada
- Chile
- China
- Colombia
- Costa Rica
- Czech Republic
- Ecuador
- France
- Germany
- (United Kingdom) Great Britain
- Greece
- India
- (Republic of Ireland) Ireland
- Italy
- Japan
- Mexico
- Netherlands
- Norway
- Panama
- Peru
- Poland
- Portugal
- Russia
- Singapore
- South Korea
- Spain
- Trinidad and Tobago
- Turkey
- Uganda
- United States
- Uruguay
- Vietnam
