= 2022 World Jigsaw Puzzle Championship =

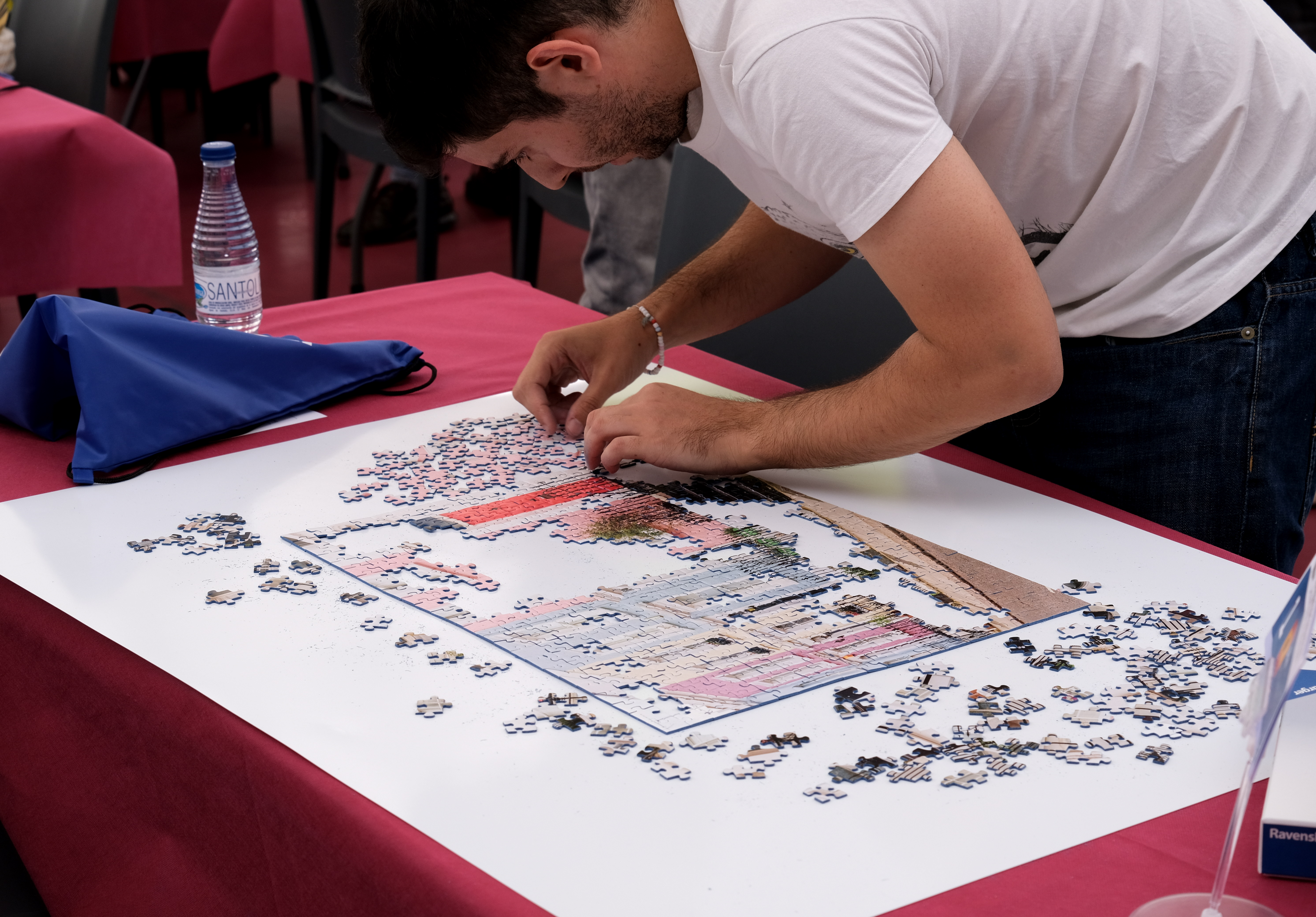
Individual Champion Alejandro Clemente during the Individual Finals

The 2022 World Jigsaw Puzzle Championship is the second edition of the World Jigsaw Puzzle Championships competition organized by the World Jigsaw Puzzle Federation (WJPF). It was held between 23 and 26 June in Valladolid, Spain.

This event returns after two years of cancelation due the global COVID-19 pandemic.

== Organisation ==
The venue for this second World Jigsaw Puzzle Championship was the Cúpula del Milenio.

The Championship included three events: team, pairs, and individual. Each event had a classification round and a grand final.

Team event

Classification round (2 groups) Teams of 4 members make 2 jigsaw puzzles of 1000 pieces in a maximum period of 3 hours. Best two teams by country and the rest of the teams (up to 40), in order of classification are qualificated to the final.

Final (80 teams) Teams of 4 members make 2 jigsaw puzzles (1 puzzle of 1000 pieces and 1 puzzle of 1500 pieces in a maximum period of 3 hours. The fastest team to finish them is the champion. The team must complete one puzzle before starting the other.

Pairs event

Classification Round (2 groups) 2 members make a jigsaw puzzles of 500 pieces in the maximum period of 90 minutes. The fastest two pairs from each country, with the remainder (up to 50) in order of classification move onto the finals.

Final (100 pairs) 2 members make a jigsaw puzzles of 1000 pieces in the maximum period of 2 hours and the fastest pair to finish it win the competition.

Individual event

Classification round (3 groups) Each individual participant makes a jigsaw puzzles of 500 pieces in the maximum period of 90 minutes. The fastest two participants from each country, with the remainder (up to 60) in order of classification move onto the finals.

Final (180 participants) Each participant makes a jigsaw puzzles of 500 pieces in the maximum period of 90 minutes and the fastest one to finish it is the champion.

== Schedule ==
Event schedule
Thursday, 23 June 2022
18h	Opening Ceremony	
Friday, 24 June 2022
10h	Individual	Group A
12h	Individual	Group B
14h	Individual	Group C
17h	Pairs	Group A
19h	Pairs	Group B
Saturday, 25 June 2022
9h	Team	Group A + B (Combined)
17h	Individual	Final
19h	Pairs	Final
Sunday, 26 June 2022
10h	Team	Final
14h	Award Ceremony	Closing Ceremony

== Results ==
Event	Gold		Silver		Bronze	
Individual	(Spain) Alejandro Clemente	34' 25"	(Norway) Kristin Thuv	41' 27"	(Czech Republic) Tereza Koptíková	42' 18"
Pairs	(Czech Republic) Katerina Novotna (Czech Republic) Tereza Koptíková	1h 02' 20"	(Spain) Demelza Becerra (Spain) Ángel Heras	1h 05' 54"	(Spain) Susana Pérez Van Deenen (Spain) Alejandro Clemente	1h 06' 05"
Team	(Spain) Non Stop; Ana Gil; Ana Isabel Jimeno; Alejandro Clemente; David Caballero	2h 54' 13"	(Germany) Eckteile; Chiara Dellantonio; Nicola Giordani; Isabelle Gall; Michael Smit	2230 pieces	(United States) Jigsaw Junkies; Grey Rogers; Katherine Dilks; Geoffrey Scott; Amber Haglund-Pagel	2216 pieces

== Medal table ==
Rank	Nation	Gold	Silver	Bronze	Total
1	Spain	2	1	1	4
2	Czech Republic	1	0	1	2
3	Germany	0	1	0	1
3	Norway	0	1	0	1
5	United States	0	0	1	1
Totals (5 entries)		3	3	3	9

== Participants ==
42 countries are represented in the second World Jigsaw Puzzle Championship.

- Andorra
- Australia
- Belarus
- Belgium
- Brazil
- Chile
- China
- Colombia
- Croatia (debut)
- Cyprus (debut)
- Czech Republic
- Denmark (debut)
- Ecuador
- France
- Germany
- (United Kingdom) Great Britain
- Greece
- Hungary (debut)
- (Republic of Ireland) Ireland
- Israel (debut)
- Italy
- Japan
- Latvia (debut)
- Malta (debut)
- Mexico
- Netherlands
- Norway
- Peru
- Poland
- Portugal
- (Romania) Roumania (debut)
- Singapore
- Slovenia (debut)
- Slovakia (debut)
- South Africa (debut)
- South Korea
- Spain
- Sweden (debut)
- Turkey
- Uganda
- Ukraine (debut)
- United States
