= 2024 World Jigsaw Puzzle Championship =

4th World Jigsaw Puzzle Championships

The 2024 World Jigsaw Puzzle Championship is the fourth edition of the World Jigsaw Puzzle Championships organized by the World Jigsaw Puzzle Federation (WJPF). It was held between 17 and 22 September in Valladolid, Spain.

== Events and rules ==
The Championship included three events: individual, pairs, and team. Each event had classifications rounds and a grand final.

=== Individual event ===
First round (6 groups): Each individual participant makes a jigsaw puzzles of 500 pieces in the maximum period of 90 minutes. The fastest participants from each country (up to 30 countries), with the remainder (up to 60) in order of classification move onto the semifinals.

Semifinals (2 groups): Each participant makes a jigsaw puzzles of 500 pieces in the maximum period of 90 minutes. The fastest participant from each country (if they complete the puzzle), with the remainder (up to 90) in order of classification move into the final.

Final (180 participants): Each participant makes a jigsaw puzzles of 500 pieces in the maximum period of 90 minutes and the fastest one to finish it is the world champion.

=== Pairs event ===
First Round (4 groups): Each pair makes a jigsaw puzzles of 500 pieces in the maximum period of 75 minutes. The fastest pairs from each country (up to 45 countries), with the remainder (up to 90) in order of classification move onto the semifinals.

Semifinal (2 groups): Each pair makes a jigsaw puzzles of 500 pieces in the maximum period of 75 minutes. The fastest pairs from each country (if they complete the puzzle - until 25 countries), with the remainder (up to 50) in order of classification move onto the finals.

Final (100 pairs): Each pair makes a jigsaw puzzles of 1000 pieces in the maximum period of 120 minutes and the fastest pair to finish it win the competition.

=== Team event ===
Classification round (3 groups) Teams of 4 members make 2 jigsaw puzzles of 1000 pieces in a maximum period of 3 hours. Best team by country (up to 20 countries) and the rest of the teams (up to 35), in order of classification are qualificated to the final.

Final (105 teams) Teams of 4 members make 2 jigsaw puzzles of 1000 pieces in a maximum period of 3 hours. The fastest team to finish them is the champion. The team must complete one puzzle before starting the other.

== Schedule ==
Event schedule
Tuesday, 17 September 2024
| 18h | Opening Ceremony | |
Wednesday, 18 September 2024
| 16:30h | Individual | Group A |
| 18h | Individual | Group B |
| 20h | Individual | Group C |
Thursday, 19 September 2024
| 9h | Individual | Group D |
| 11h | Individual | Group E |
| 13h | Individual | Group F |
| 16h | Pairs | Group A |
| 17:45h | Pairs | Group B |
| 19:30h | Pairs | Group C |
| 21:15h | Pairs | Group D |
Friday, 20 September 2024
| 9h | Individual | Semifinal 1 |
| 11h | Individual | Semifinal 2 |
| 14h | Pairs | Semifinal 1 |
| 15:45h | Pairs | Semifinal 2 |
| 18h | Teams | Group A |
Saturday, 21 September 2024
| 9h | Team | Group B |
| 12:30h | Team | Group C |
| 17h | Individual | Final |
| 19h | Pairs | Final |
Sunday, 22 September 2024
| 10h | Team | Final |
| 14h | Award Ceremony | Closing Ceremony |

== Results ==
| Event | Gold | | Silver | | Bronze | |
|---|---|---|---|---|---|---|
| Individual | (Norway) Kristin Thuv | 00:37:38 | (Poland) Weronika Huptas | 00:39:12 | (Poland) Krystjan Niedziela | 00:41:09 |
| Pairs | (Czech Republic) Tereza Koptíková (Czech Republic) Markéta Freislerová | 00:47:41 | (Germany) Katharina Reiner (Italy) Chiara Dellantonio | 00:48:06 | (United States) Kelly Walter (United States) Andrea Peng | 00:49:09 |
| Team | (United States) Busy Birdies; Andrea Peng; Jeanne Roiter; Cathy Roiter; Becca Taylor | 01:16:07 | (Czech Republic) Czech Puzzlequeens; Tereza Koptíková; Markéta Freislerová; Kateřina Klinková; Jana Ondroušková | 01:16:50 | (United States) Some Assembly Required; Karen Kavett; Tiffany Medeiros; Kelly Walter; Katherine Dilks | 01:21:52 |

== Medal table ==
| Rank | Nation | Gold | Silver | Bronze | Total |
|---|---|---|---|---|---|
| 1 | Czech Republic | 1 | 1 | 0 | 2 |
| 2 | United States | 1 | 0 | 2 | 3 |
| 3 | Norway | 1 | 0 | 0 | 1 |
| 4 | Poland | 0 | 1 | 1 | 2 |
| 5 | Germany | 0 | 1 | 0 | 1 |
| Totals (5 entries) | | 3 | 3 | 3 | 9 |

== Participants ==
74 countries were scheduled to be represented at the fourth World Puzzle Championships.

- Andorra
- Albania (debut)
- Argentina
- Australia
- Austria
- Barbados (debut)
- Belarus
- Belgium
- Bolivia (debut)
- Brazil
- Bulgaria
- Cameroon (debut)
- Canada
- Chile
- China
- Colombia
- Croatia
- Cuba (debut)
- Cyprus
- Czech Republic
- Denmark
- Dominica (debut)
- Ecuador
- Egypt
- El Salvador (debut)
- Estonia
- Finland
- France
- Germany
- (United Kingdom) Great Britain
- Greece
- Guatemala (debut)
- Honduras (debut)
- Hungary
- India
- Indonesia (debut)
- Iran (debut)
- (Republic of Ireland) Ireland
- Iceland (debut)
- International Puzzlers (Russian nationals competing personally)
- Israel
- Italy
- Japan
- Kuwait (debut)
- Latvia
- Lithuania
- Luxembourg
- Malaysia
- Mexico
- Netherlands
- New Zealand
- Nigeria (debut)
- Norway
- Pakistan (debut)
- Paraguay
- Peru
- Poland
- Portugal
- (Romania) Roumania
- Saudi Arabia (debut)
- Serbia (debut)
- Slovenia
- Slovakia
- South Africa
- South Korea
- Spain
- Sweden
- Switzerland
- Thailand
- Turkey
- Ukraine
- United States
- Venezuela (debut)
- Vietnam
