= World Jigsaw Puzzle Championships =

Annual competition in Spain

World Jigsaw Puzzle Championship
- Status: Active
- Date: Varying
- Frequency: Annual
- Country: Spain
- Inaugurated: 2019
- Next event: 2026
- Organiser: World Jigsaw Puzzle Federation
- Website: worldjigsawpuzzle.org

The World Jigsaw Puzzle Championship is an annual event organized by the World Jigsaw Puzzle Federation, supported by multiple national associations such as the United States Jigsaw Puzzle Association and Australian Jigsaw Puzzle Association. The World Championship was started in 2019, and all editions have been held in Valladolid, Spain. The Championship include three events: team, pairs and individual.

The 2019 championships were the first time a world ranking is available for jigsaw puzzle competitors.

== History ==
In 2019 the World Jigsaw Puzzle Federation was founded and in the same year, the first World Jigsaw Championship was held in Valladolid, Spain. Due to the global COVID-19 pandemic the event was cancelled in 2020 and 2021, and it resumed in 2022.

The 2026 event was also held in Valladolid, from 16 to 20 September.

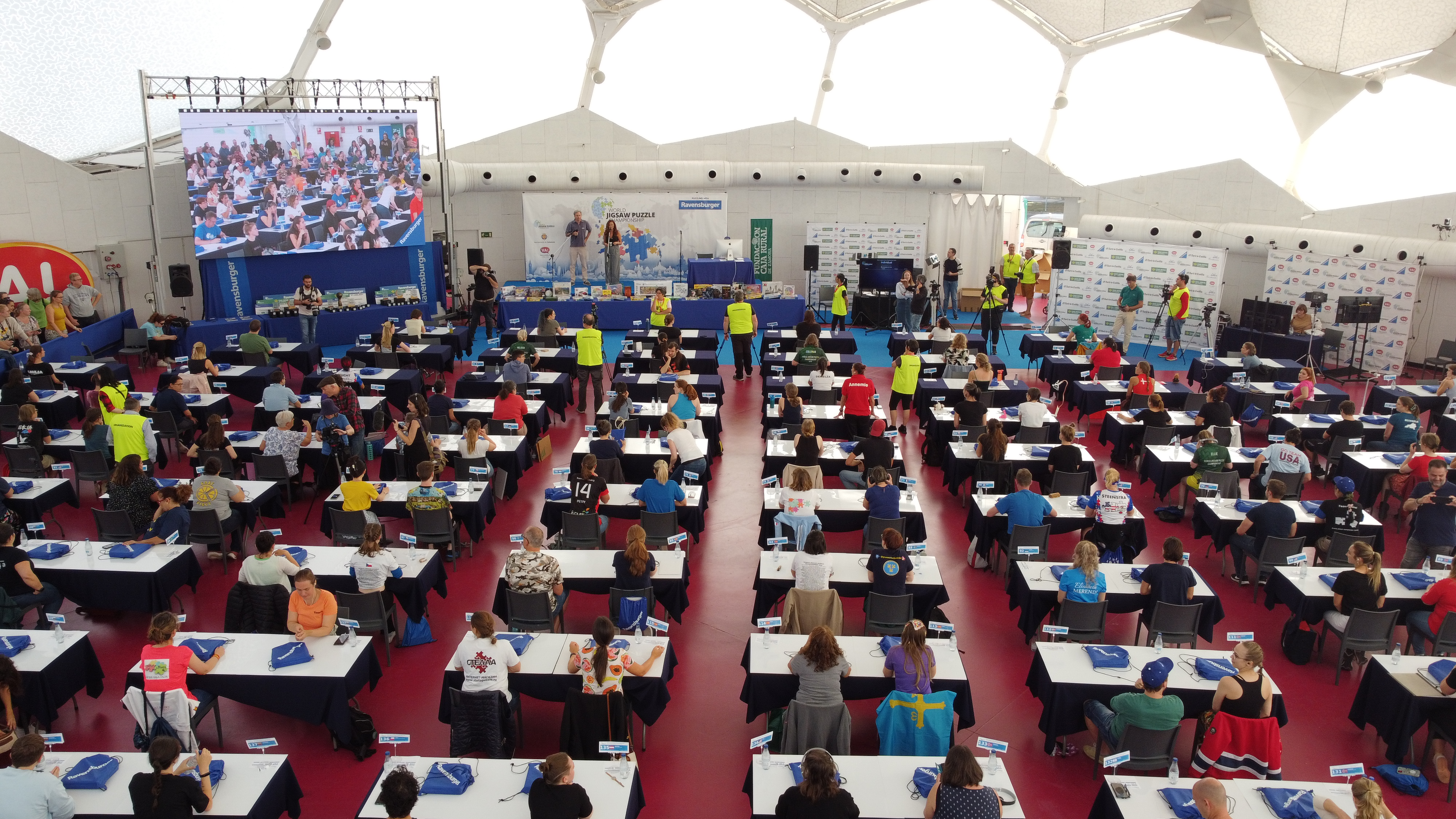
Presentation before begin test

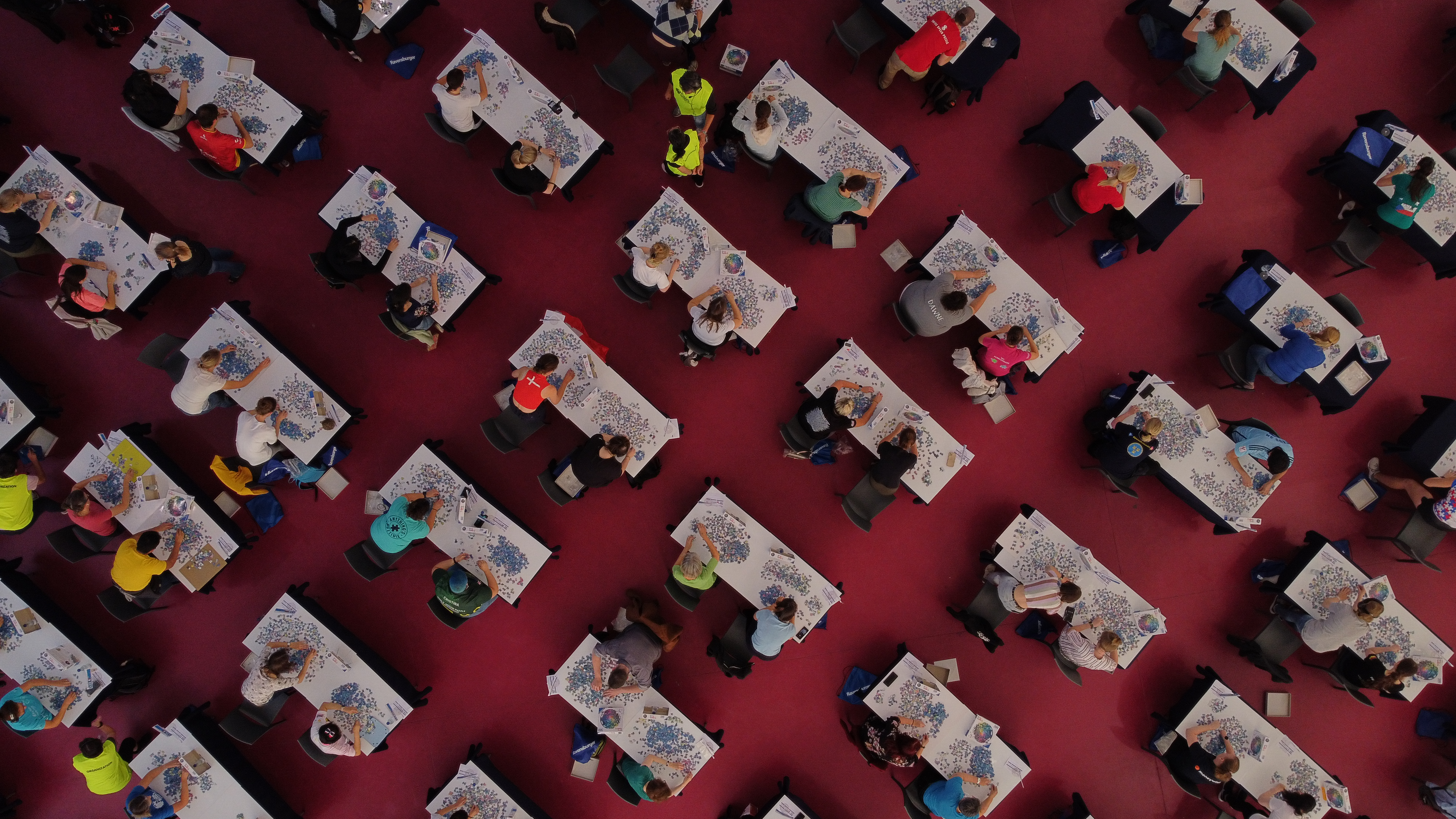
Participants competing in Individual semifinal WJPC 2023

== Events ==
Three events are contested in the championships. In all events, placement is determined by the fastest completion within the time limit. For competitors who have not finished the assigned puzzle(s) within the time limit, the remaining pieces are counted to determine position.

- Team event: Teams of four complete multiple puzzles (1,000, 1,500 or 2,000 pieces) in the time limit.
- Pairs event: Two competitors complete a single puzzle (500 or 1,000 pieces) within a time limit.
- Individual event: Each individual participant completes a 500-piece puzzle within a time limit.

In the first World Jigsaw Puzzle Championships, only one final round was held in each event. In 2022 the semifinals were introduced in all events. For 2023, due to the increase in the number of participants, another round has also been introduced prior to the semifinals of the individual event. For 2024, also a first round has been introduced prior to the semifinals of the pairs event.

As of 2025 5 sub-categories of awards have been added; Individual Junior18 (players under 18 years old), Individual Senior A (players from 45 to 60 years old), Individual Senior B (players aged 60+) Individual Debutant and Pairs debutant (Both debutants categories are for players who have not competed in that category at a previous WJPC).

== Championships ==
| Year | City | Venue | Events | Nations | Participants |
|---|---|---|---|---|---|
| 2019 | (Spain) Valladolid | Cúpula del Milenio | 3 | 39 | 531 |
| 2022 | (Spain) Valladolid | Cúpula del Milenio | 3 | 44 | 470 |
| 2023 | (Spain) Valladolid | Cúpula del Milenio | 3 | 54 | 905 |
| 2024 | (Spain) Valladolid | Cúpula del Milenio | 3 | 74 | 1777 |
| 2025 | (Spain) Valladolid | Cúpula del Milenio | 3 | 65 | 1154 |
| 2026 | (Spain) Valladolid | Valladolid Fair | 3 | 67 | 1319 |

== All-time medal table ==
Updated after 2026 World Jigsaw Puzzle Championship

| Rank | Nation | Gold | Silver | Bronze | Total |
|---|---|---|---|---|---|
| 1 | Czech Republic | 5 | 4 | 5 | 14 |
| 2 | Spain | 5 | 1 | 3 | 9 |
| 3 | Poland | 2 | 3 | 1 | 6 |
| 4 | Germany | 1 | 4 | 2 | 7 |
| 5 | United States | 1 | 2 | 3 | 6 |
| 6 | Norway | 1 | 2 | 0 | 3 |
| 7 | Netherlands | 1 | 0 | 2 | 3 |
| 7 | Russia | 1 | 0 | 2 | 3 |
| 9 | Great Britain | 0 | 1 | 0 | 1 |
| Totals (9 entries) | | 17 | 17 | 18 | 52 |

Note: Some medals was taken by pairs/teams competing as mixed without national flag.

=== All-time Top 10 ===
| Rank | Athlete | Gold | Silver | Bronze | Total |
|---|---|---|---|---|---|
| 1 | (Czech Republic) Tereza Koptíková | 4 | 2 | 3 | 9 |
| 2 | (Spain) Alejandro Clemente León | 4 | 0 | 2 | 6 |
| 3 | (Czech Republic) Markéta Freislerová | 3 | 2 | 3 | 8 |
| 4 | (Czech Republic) Kateřina Klinková (Novotná) | 2 | 4 | 1 | 7 |
| 5 | (Poland) Weronika Huptas | 2 | 1 | 0 | 3 |
| 6 | (Czech Republic) Jana Ondroušková (Hanzelková) | 1 | 4 | 0 | 5 |
| 7 | (Italy) Chiara Dellantonio | 1 | 3 | 0 | 4 |
| 8 | (Germany) Katharina Reiner | 1 | 2 | 1 | 4 |
| 9 | (Germany) Maja Von Borstel | 1 | 2 | 0 | 3 |
| 9 | (Norway) Kristin Thuv | 1 | 2 | 0 | 3 |

== Participants by event ==
| Year | Nº ind. | Nº pair | Nº teams |
|---|---|---|---|
| 2019 | 199 | 196 | 86 |
| 2022 | 240 | 176 | 77 |
| 2023 | 572 | 340 | 159 |
| 2024 | 1102 | 721 | 300 |
| 2025 | 1154 | 731 | 297 |
| 2026 | 812 | 500 | 236 |

== Results – individuals ==
| Year | Gold | Silver | Bronze |
|---|---|---|---|
| 2026 | (Netherlands) Maartje van der Meer | (Germany) Maja Von Borstel | (Germany) Nina Schicks |
| 2025 | (Poland) Weronika Huptas | (Poland) Wiktor Kacprzak | (Germany) Katharina Reiner |
| 2024 | (Norway) Kristin Thuv | (Poland) Weronika Huptas | (Poland) Krystian Niedziela |
| 2023 | (Spain) Alejandro Clemente León | (Norway) Kristin Thuv | (Czech Republic) Markéta Freislerová |
| 2022 | (Spain) Alejandro Clemente León | (Norway) Kristin Thuv | (Czech Republic) Tereza Koptíková |
| 2019 | (Czech Republic) Jana Hanzelková | (Poland) Mariusz Ślizewski | (Czech Republic) Katerina Novotna |

== Championships records ==
| Event | Participant | Time | Round |
|---|---|---|---|
| Individual (500 pieces) | (Poland) Wiktor Kacprzak | 00:22:02 | First round 2025 |
| Pairs (500 pieces) | (United Kingdom) Rachael Chambers; Emma Quirke | 00:18:10 | First round 2026 |
| Pairs (1,000 pieces) | (Germany) Maja Von Borstel; Franziska Treber | 00:43:40 | Final 2026 |
| Team (1,000 + 1,000 pieces) | (Czech Republic) Czech Puzzlequeens; Jana Ondroušková; Kateřina Klinková; Tereza Koptíková; Markéta Freislerová | 01:01:02 | First round 2025 |
| Team (1,000 + 1,500 pieces) | (Spain) Non Stop; Ana Gil; Ana Isabel Jimeno; Alejandro Clemente; David Caballero | 02:54:13 | Final 2022 |
| Team (4 puzzles) | (Russia) Siberian Team; Irina Batalova; Valentina Baburchenkova; Natalia Komarova; Galina Medvedeva; Marina Radchenko | 04:11:17 | Final 2019 |

== See also ==
- European Jigsaw Puzzle Championships
