= European Jigsaw Puzzle Championships =

Annual competition

European Jigsaw Puzzle Championship
- Status: Active
- Date: Varying
- Frequency: Annual
- Inaugurated: 2025
- Organiser: European Committee for Jigsaw Puzzling
- Website: ecjp.eu

The European Jigsaw Puzzle Championship is an annual event organized by the European Committee for Jigsaw Puzzling, supported by multiple European associations. The first European Championship was organized by the Hungarian Jigsaw Puzzle Association in 2025, in Budapest, Hungary. The Championship includes three events: team, pairs and individual. The 2026 edition will be held in Istanbul, Turkey from 27-29 November 2026.

== History ==
The first European Championship for Jigsaw Puzzling was organized by the Hungarian Jigsaw Puzzle Association in 2025, in Budapest, Hungary.

== Events ==
Three events are contested in the championships. In all events, placement is determined by the fastest completion within the time limit. For competitors who have not finished the assigned puzzle(s) within the time limit, the remaining pieces are counted to determine the final position.

- Team event: Teams of minimum 3, maximum 4 people complete two puzzles (1,000 pieces) within a time limit.
- Pairs event: Pairs of two competitors complete a single puzzle (500 or 1,000 pieces) within a time limit.
- Individual event: Each individual participant completes a 500-piece puzzle within a time limit.

== Championships ==
Year	City	Venue	Events	Nations	Participants
2025	(Hungary) Budapest	Mészáros Ferenc Sportcsarnok	3	29	692
2026	(Turkey) Istanbul	Sepetçiler Köşkü	3		

== Participants by event ==
Year	Nº ind.	Nº pair	Nº teams
2025	396	253	115
2026			

== Results - Individuals ==
Year	Gold	Silver	Bronze
2025	(Germany) Katharina Reiner	(Poland) Weronika Huptas	(Poland) Wiktor Kacprzak
2026			

== Results - Pairs ==
Year	Gold	Silver	Bronze
2025	(Germany) Katharina Reiner (Italy) Chiara Dellantonio	(Poland) Weronika Huptas (Poland) Anna Kazana	(Czech Republic) Tereza Koptíková (Czech Republic) Markéta Feislerová
2026			

== Results - Teams ==
Year	Gold	Silver	Bronze
2025	(Finland) EJJ Squad	(Czech Republic) Czeh Puzzlequeens	(Hungary) Need4Speed
2026			

== See also ==
- World Jigsaw Puzzle Championships
