= XxxHolic (miniseries) =

2013 miniseries directed by Keisuke Toyoshima

xxxHolic
- DVD box of the drama featuring Kimihiro Watanuki and Yuko Ichihara
- Japanese: CLAMPドラマ ホリック〜xxxHOLiC〜
- Literal meaning: CLAMP Drama xxxHOLiC
- Revised Hepburn: CLAMP Dorama Horikku
- Genre: Supernatural; Drama; Dark fantasy
- Based on: xxxHolic by CLAMP
- Written by: Jun Tsugita; Keisuke Toyoshima
- Directed by: Keisuke Toyoshima
- Starring: Anne Watanabe; Shōta Sometani; Masahiro Higashide; Karen Miyazaki; Yumi Adachi
- Music by: Nobuhiko Morino
- Opening theme: "Aitai" by Suga Shikao
- Ending theme: "You Tell Me" by Chay
- Country of origin: Japan
- Original language: Japanese
- No. of episodes: 8

Production
- Producers: Daisuke Katagiri; Aya Matsunaga; Chikako Nakabayashi
- Cinematography: Yasutaka Nagano
- Running time: 30 minutes

Original release
- Network: Wowow
- Release: February 24 – April 16, 2013

xxxHolic (Note: Also known as CLAMP Drama xxxHOLiC (Japanese: CLAMPドラマ ホリック〜xxxHOLiC〜, Hepburn: CLAMP Dorama Horikku)) is a 2013 Japanese supernatural dark fantasy drama miniseries based on the manga series of the same name by manga artist group CLAMP. The miniseries was written and directed by Keisuke Toyoshima with Jun Tsugita as a co-writer, and stars Anne Watanabe as Yuko Ichihara and Shōta Sometani as Kimihiro Watanuki. The miniseries was broadcast on Wowow between February 24 and April 16, 2013.

== Premise ==
xxxHolic follows the story of Kimihiro Watanuki, a high school student that is plagued by ayakashi spirits, who stumbles upon a shop that grants wishes. He meets the owner, Yuko Ichihara, a mysterious and esoteric witch of many names. She offers to grant his wish to be rid of spirits, but for a price: to become Yuko's part-time cook and housekeeper.

== Cast and characters ==
- Anne Watanabe as Yuko Ichihara, a shop owner that grants people's wishes.
- Shōta Sometani as Kimihiro Watanuki, a teenage boy that can see and is plagued by ayakashi.
- Masahiro Higashide as Shizuka Dōmeki, Kimihiro's classmate that lives in a shrine.
- Karen Miyazaki as Himawari Kunogi, Kimihiro's love interest and classmate.
- Rika Kawashima and Tsumugi Hatekeyama as Maru and Moro, two artificial beings that keep Yuko's shop in existence.
- Yumi Adachi as Jōrogumo, a yōkai that is linked to spiders.

== Production ==
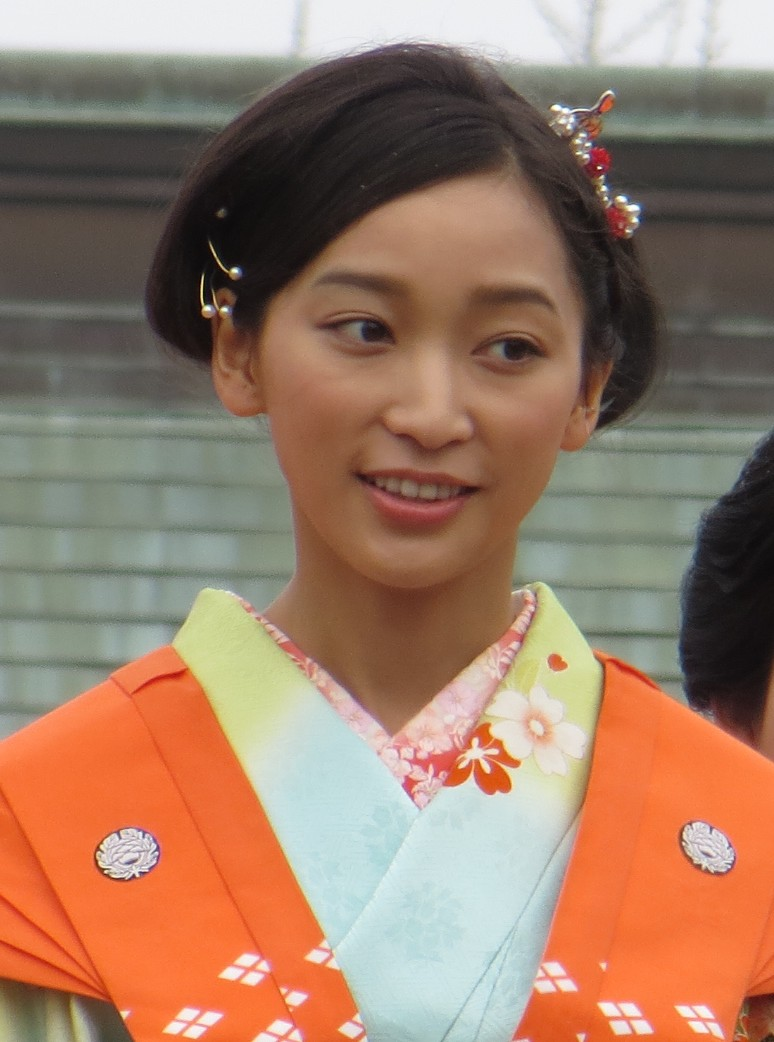
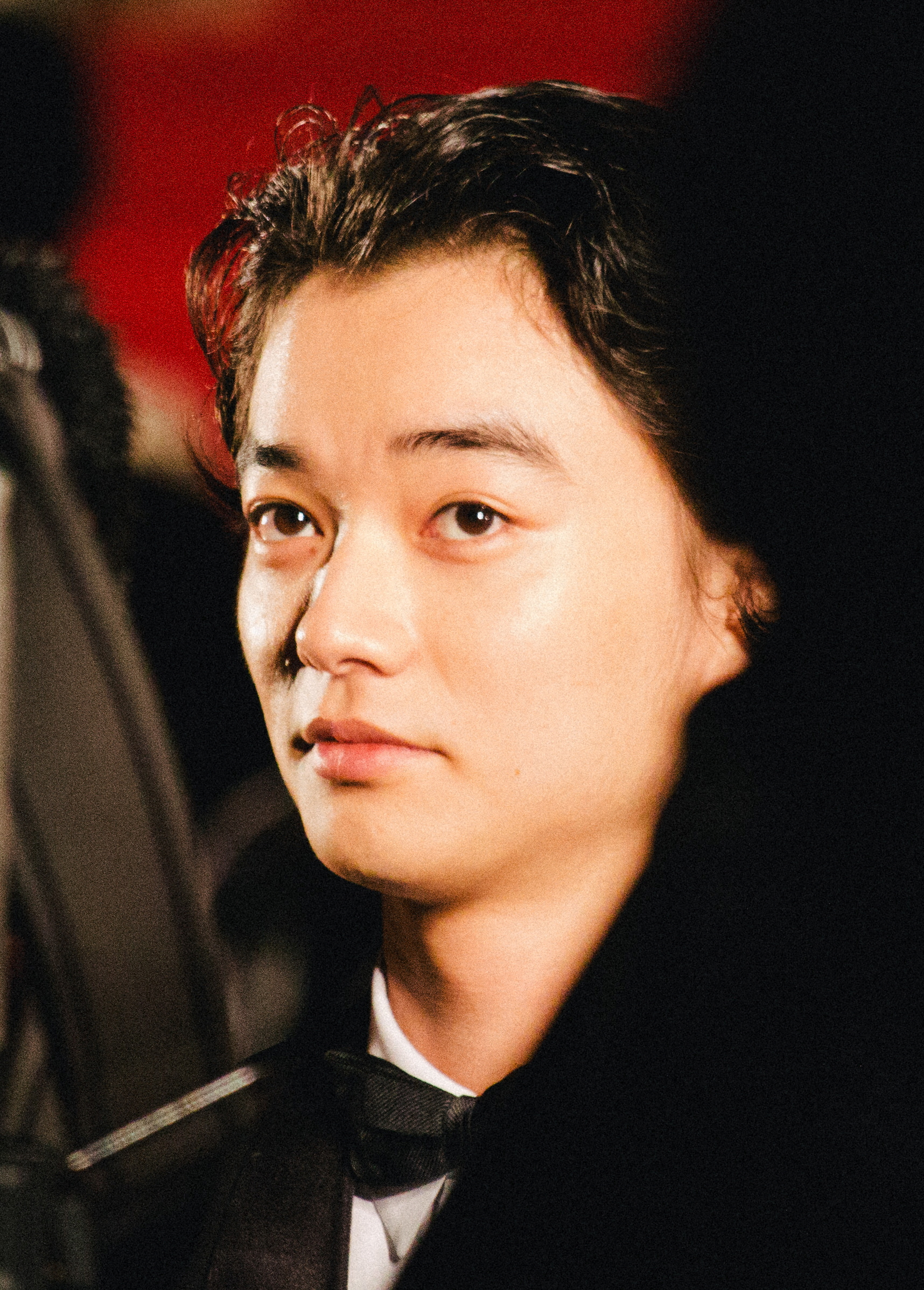
Anne Watanabe portrays Yuko, while Shota Sometani plays Watanuki.

In September 2012, it was announced that CLAMP's manga series, xxxHolic, would be adapted into a live-action television miniseries. Anne Watanabe was announced as the role of Yuko Ichihara, while Shōta Sometani was to play Kimihiro Watanuki. The series is directed and written by Keisuke Toyoshima with Jun Tsugita as a co-writer, and aired on Wowow on February 24, 2013. It was announced that the series would run for eight episodes. Suga Shikao, who provided many theme songs for the anime series, provided the miniseries' opening theme song, "Aitai" (アイタイ).

== Episode list ==
Episode number	Air date	Title	Written by	Direction
Episode 1	February 24, 2013	"Fate" (縁, en)	Jun Tsugita	Keisuke Toyoshima
Episode 2	March 3, 2013	"Compensation" (対価, Taika)	Jun Tsugita	Keisuke Toyoshima
Episode 3	March 10, 2013	"100 Stories" (百物語, Hyakumonogatari)	Keisuke Toyoshima; Jun Tsugita	Keisuke Toyoshima
Episode 4	March 17, 2013	"Angel-san" (エンジェルさん)	Keisuke Toyoshima; Jun Tsugita	Jun Tsugita
Episode 5	March 24, 2013	"Hydrangea" (紫陽花, Ajisai)	Jun Tsugita	Jun Tsugita
Episode 6	March 31, 2013	"Lady Spider" (女郎蜘蛛, Jōrogumo)	Jun Tsugita; Keisuke Toyoshima	Keisuke Toyoshima
Episode 7	April 7, 2013	"Himawari" (ひまわり)	Jun Tsugita	Keisuke Toyoshima
Episode 8	April 14, 2013	"Butterfly" (蝶, Chō)	Jun Tsugita	Keisuke Toyoshima

== Reception ==
Richard Eisenbeis of Kotaku felt as though Shōta Sometani's portrayal of Watanuki's character was appropriate, but believed Anne Watanabe, who played Yuko, overshadowed him.
