= Anne Watanabe =

Japanese actress and model (born 1986)

- 渡辺 杏
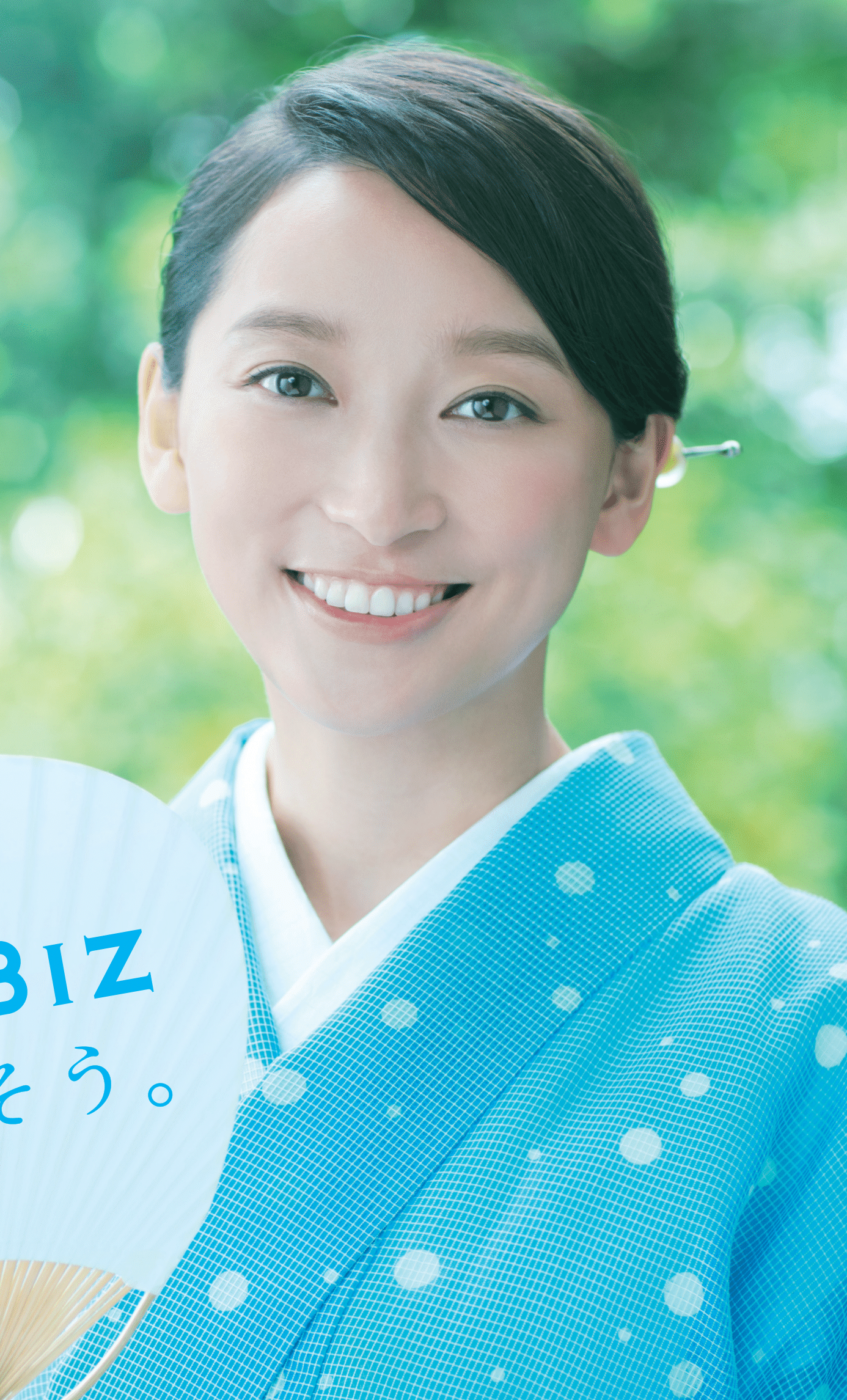
- Watanabe for Cool Biz in 2017
- Born: 14 April 1986 (age 40); Tokyo, Japan
- Occupations: Fashion model; actress; singer; TV host
- Years active: 2010–present
- Height: 1.74 m (5 ft 8 1/2 in)
- Spouse: Masahiro Higashide (m. 2015; div. 2020)
- Children: 3
- Parents: Ken Watanabe (father); Yumiko Watanabe (mother)

YouTube information
- Channel: 杏/anne TOKYO
- Years active: 2021–present
- Genre: Vlog
- Subscribers: 1.28 million
- Views: 186 million
- Last updated: 1 November 2025

Anne Watanabe (渡辺 杏, Watanabe An; born 14 April 1986) is a Japanese fashion model, actress and singer, the daughter of film actor Ken Watanabe and his first wife Yumiko. In her modeling work, she is known by the mononym Anne.

== Career ==
Watanabe's first high-profile modeling season was spring/summer 2007, in which she was featured in runway shows for Anna Sui, Diane von Furstenberg, Tommy Hilfiger, and Vivienne Tam, among others. She also walked for Baby Phat, Imitation of Christ, Karl Lagerfeld, Lacoste, Marc by Marc Jacobs, and Thakoon in subsequent seasons.

Watanabe has been featured in print advertisements for Anna Sui and NARS Cosmetics. She was the main visual model for Sui's Secret Wish Magic Romance fragrance for both print and video.

== Personal life ==
In Japan, Watanabe is also a well-known reki-jo (history girl) -- a female history otaku. She can speak English and French to some extent. On 21 September 2023, she participated in the annual World Jigsaw Puzzle Championship.

=== Marriage and family ===
Watanabe married actor Masahiro Higashide on 1 January 2015. On 16 May 2016, Watanabe gave birth to twin daughters. On 7 November 2017, she gave birth to a son.

On 23 January 2020, Shūkan Bunshun revealed that Watanabe's husband had been having an extramarital affair with actress Erika Karata since 2017, when Watanabe was pregnant with their third child, which was later confirmed by Higashide's agency. On 1 August 2020, Watanabe finalized her divorce with Higashide, promising that they would work together to take care of the children.

Watanabe and her children are currently residing in France as of August 2022.

== Filmography ==
=== Television ===
| Year | Title | Role | Notes | Ref. |
|---|---|---|---|---|
| 2007 | High and Low | Detective | Television film | |
| 2009 | Tenchijin | Megohime | Taiga drama | |
| 2009 | The Gorgeous Spy | Miku Hirahara | | |
| 2009 | Samurai High School | Ai Nagasawa | | |
| 2010 | Shinzanmono | Naho Kamikawa | Episode 1 | |
| 2010 | Don't Cry Anymore | Marika Tachibana | | |
| 2010 | Joker | Asuka Myagi | | |
| 2011 | Desperate Motherhood | Yuko Akiyama | Lead role | |
| 2011 | Yokai Ningen Bem | Bela | | |
| 2012 | Taira no Kiyomori | Hōjō Masako | Taiga drama | |
| 2013 | xxxHOLiC | Yuko Ichihara | Lead role | |
| 2013 | Ghostly Girl | Akane | | |
| 2013 | Bon Appetit! | Meiko Uno | Lead role; Asadora | |
| 2014–15 | Hanasaki Mai Speaks Out | Mai Hanasaki | Lead role | |
| 2015 | Dating: What's It Like to Be in Love? | Yoriko Yabushita | Lead role | |
| 2021 | Japan Sinks: People of Hope | Minori Shiina | | |
| 2026 | Blood and Sweat | Aki Suzumiya | Lead role; Finnish-Japanese drama | |

=== Film ===
| Year | Title | Role | Notes | Ref. |
|---|---|---|---|---|
| 2008 | The Cherry Orchard: Blossoming | | | |
| 2010 | Bandage | | | |
| 2011 | Ninja Kids!!! | Shina Yamamoto | | |
| 2012 | Yōkai Ningen Bem: The Movie | Bela | | |
| 2013 | Platinum Data | | | |
| 2013 | Midsummer's Equation | | | |
| 2015 | Miss Hokusai | Oei (voice) | | |
| 2016 | Lost and Found | | | |
| 2016 | Golden Orchestra! | | Lead role | |
| 2019 | Birthday Wonderland | | | |
| 2021 | Cube | Asako Kai | | |
| 2022 | The Deer King | Sae (voice) | | |
| 2022 | Tombi: Father and Son | Yumi | | |
| 2023 | Tokyo MER: Mobile Emergency Room: The Movie | Yū Kamoi | | |
| 2023 | Kingdom 3: The Flame of Destiny | Zhi Xia | | |
| 2023 | Fly Me to the Saitama: From Biwa Lake with Love | | | |
| 2023 | Totto-Chan: The Little Girl at the Window | Chō Kuroyanagi (voice) | | |
| 2024 | Stay Mum | Chisako | Lead role | |
| 2025 | The Solitary Gourmet | Chiaki Matsuo | | |
| 2026 | Tokyo MER: Mobile Emergency Room – Capital Crisis | Yū Kamoi | | |
| 2026 | Shumei: The Living Legacy of Kabuki | Narrator | Documentary | |

=== Radio ===
- Book Bar (2008–present, J-Wave)

=== Documentary ===
- Asia's Great Ruins (Also known as Ring of Civilization, 2015, NHK, as navigator)

=== Discography ===
==== Mini-albums ====
- Lights (2010, Epic/Sony)
- Ai o Anata ni (2012, Epic/Sony)

== Awards and nominations ==
Year presented, name of the award ceremony, category, nominee(s) of the award, and the result of the nomination
| Year | Award ceremony | Category | Nominated work(s) | Result | Ref. |
|---|---|---|---|---|---|
| 2006 | 49th FECJ Awards | International Model of the Year | Herself | Won | |
| 2010 | 64th Television Drama Academy Awards | Best Supporting Actress | Naka nai to Kimeta Hi | Won | |
| 2012 | 36th Elan d'or Awards | Newcomer of the Year | | Won | |
| 2012 | 5th Tokyo Drama Awards | Best Supporting Actress | Yōkai Ningen Bem | Won | |
| 2015 | 23rd Hashida Award | Newcomer of the Year | Gochisousan and Hanasaki Mai ga Damattenai | Won | |
| 2015 | 52nd Galaxy Award | Individual Award | Hanasaki Mai Speaks Out, Kuroha, and Date – Koi to wa Donna Mono Kashira | Won | |
