= 2023 World Jigsaw Puzzle Championship =

The 2023 World Jigsaw Puzzle Championship is the third edition of the World Jigsaw Puzzle Championships organized by the World Jigsaw Puzzle Federation (WJPF). It was held between 20 and 24 September in Valladolid, Spain.

== Events and rules ==
The Championship included three events: individual, pairs, and team. Each event had classifications rounds and a grand final.

=== Individual event ===
First round (6 groups): Each individual participant makes a jigsaw puzzles of 500 pieces in the maximum period of 90 minutes. The fastest participants from each country (up to 30 countries), with the remainder (up to 60) in order of classification move onto the semifinals.

Semifinals (2 groups): Each participant makes a jigsaw puzzles of 500 pieces in the maximum period of 90 minutes. The fastest participants from each country, with the remainder (up to 90) in order of classification move into the final.

Final (180 participants): Each participant makes a jigsaw puzzles of 500 pieces in the maximum period of 90 minutes and the fastest one to finish it is the world champion.

=== Pairs event ===
Classification Round (3 groups): Each pair makes a jigsaw puzzles of 500 pieces in the maximum period of 90 minutes. The fastest pairs from each country (up to 15 countries), with the remainder (up to 30) in order of classification move onto the finals.

Final (90 pairs): Each pair makes a jigsaw puzzles of 1000 pieces in the maximum period of 2 hours and the fastest pair to finish it win the competition.

=== Team event ===
Classification round (2 groups) Teams of 4 members make 2 jigsaw puzzles of 1000 pieces in a maximum period of 3 hours. Best two teams by country (up to 25 countries) and the rest of the teams (up to 50), in order of classification are qualificated to the final.

Final (100 teams) Teams of 4 members make 2 jigsaw puzzles of 1000 pieces in a maximum period of 3 hours. The fastest team to finish them is the champion. The team must complete one puzzle before starting the other.

== Schedule ==
Event schedule
Wednesday, 20 September 2023
18h	Opening Ceremony	
Thursday, 21 September 2023
10h	Individual	Group A
12h	Individual	Group B
14h	Individual	Group C
17h	Individual	Group D
19h	Individual	Group E
21h	Individual	Group F
Friday, 22 September 2023
10h	Pairs	Group A
12h	Pairs	Group B
14h	Pairs	Group C
17h	Individual	Semifinal 1
19h	Individual	Semifinal 2
Saturday, 23 September 2023
9h	Team	Group A
12:30h	Team	Group AB
16:30h	Individual	Final
19h	Pairs	Final
Sunday, 24 September 2023
10h	Team	Final
14h	Award Ceremony	Closing Ceremony

== Results ==
Event	Gold		Silver		Bronze	
Individual	(Spain) Alejandro Clemente León	00:37:59	(Norway) Kristin Thuv	00:38:32	(Czech Republic) Markéta Freislerová	00:42:34
Pairs	(Spain) Alejandro Clemente (Spain) Gisela Arranz	01:32:18	(United States) Sarah Schuler (United States) Michaela Keener	01:46:37	(Czech Republic) Tereza Koptíková (Czech Republic) Markéta Freislerová	01:47:24
Team	(Czech Republic) Las Chicas Checas; Tereza Koptíková; Markéta Freislerová; Eva Žemličková; Helen Karmínová Kellner	01:30:25	(United States) The Misfits; Sarah Schuler; Michaela Keener; Elizabeth Caron; Karen Kavett	01:33:25	(Spain) Non Stop; Ana Gil; Ana Isabel Jimeno; Alejandro Clemente; David Caballero	01:37:16

== Medal table ==
Rank	Nation	Gold	Silver	Bronze	Total
1	Spain	2	0	1	3
2	Czech Republic	1	0	2	3
3	United States	0	2	0	2
4	Norway	0	1	0	1
Totals (4 entries)		3	3	3	9

== Participants ==
54 countries were represented in the third World Jigsaw Puzzle Championship.

- Andorra
- Argentina
- Australia
- Austria (debut)
- Bangladesh (debut)
- Belarus
- Belgium
- Brazil
- Bulgaria
- Canada
- Chile
- China
- Colombia
- Croatia
- Czech Republic
- Denmark
- Egypt (debut)
- Estonia (debut)
- Finland (debut)
- France
- Germany
- (United Kingdom) Great Britain
- Greece
- Hungary
- India
- (Republic of Ireland) Ireland
- Israel
- Italy
- Japan
- Latvia
- Lithuania (debut)
- Luxembourg (debut)
- Malaysia (debut)
- Malta
- Netherlands
- New Zealand (debut)
- Norway
- Paraguay (debut)
- Peru
- Poland
- Portugal
- (Romania) Roumania
- Russia
- Slovenia
- Slovakia
- South Africa
- Spain
- Sweden
- Switzerland
- Thailand (debut)
- Tunisia (debut)
- Turkey
- Ukraine
- United States
