= Tina Tamashiro =

Japanese actress and model (born 1997)

- 玉城 ティナ
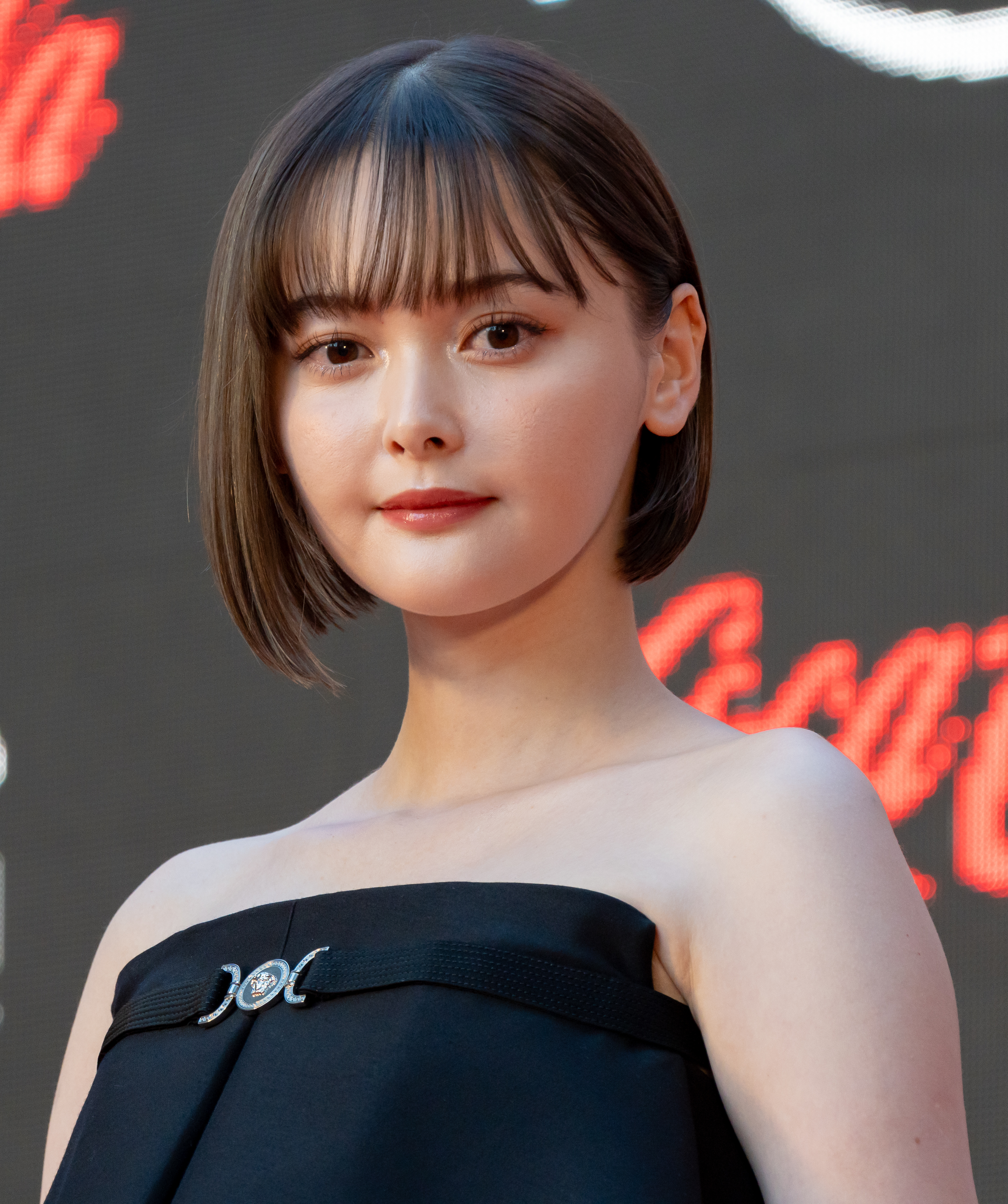
- Tamashiro at the Tokyo International Film Festival in October 2023
- Born: October 8, 1997 (age 29); Urasoe, Okinawa, Japan
- Occupations: Actress; model
- Years active: 2012–present
- Agent(s): Dine and indy.
- Height: 164 cm (5 ft 5 in)
- Spouse: Unknown (m. 2024)

Tina Tamashiro (玉城 ティナ, Tamashiro Tina; born October 8, 1997) is a Japanese actress and model. She was scouted by the president of her agency when she was walking home with her friends. In July 2012, Tamashiro won the Kodansha sponsored Miss iD 2013 Grand Prix. In a Vivi interview she said she wanted to be a "model idol".

== Personal life ==
Tamashiro was born on October 8, 1997 in Urasoe City, Okinawa Prefecture to an American father and a Japanese mother.

During her birthday on October 8, 2024, she announced her marriage.

== Filmography ==
=== Film ===
Year	Title	Role	Notes	Ref.
2015	Chasuke's Journey	Chako		
2016	Wolf Girl and Black Prince	Marin Tachibana		
2016	Sadako vs. Kayako	Suzuka Takagi		
2017	Policeman and Me	Mikado Yaguchi		
2017	The Dark Maidens	Diana Decheva		
2017	Sagrada Reset: Part 1	Yōka Murase		
2017	Sagrada Reset: Part 2	Yōka Murase		
2018	Girl's Play	Hikari Sasaki		
2018	You, I Love	Koyomi Sakashita		
2018	Missions of Love	Yukina Himuro	Lead role	
2019	Chiwawa	Yumi		
2019	Hell Girl	Ai Enma	Lead role	
2019	Diner	Kanako Oba		
2019	The Flowers of Evil	Sawa Nakamura	Lead role	
2020	AI Amok	Mako Iida		
2021	Belle	Ruka Watanabe (voice)		
2022	The Way of the Househusband	Yukari Ōmae		
2022	xxxHolic	Himawari Kunogi		
2022	Goodbye Cruel World	Miru Sakaguchi		
2022	By the Window			
2023	Thorns of Beauty	Riko	Lead role	
2023	Downfall			
2023	#Mito	Mito Yamane	Lead role	
2025	366 Days	Kasumi		
2025	Thus Spoke Rohan Kishibe: At a Confessional	Maria		
2027	Last Dance			

=== Television drama ===
Year	Title	Role	Notes	Ref.
2014	Dark System Koi no Ozakettei-sen	Yuri Shiraishi		
2014	Urero☆Mi Taiken Shojo	GCK Kogarinka		
2020	Suits season 2	Maho Yoshino	Episode 1	
2020	O Maidens in Your Savage Season	Niina Sugawara	Lead role	
2020	The Way of the Househusband	Yukari Ōmae		
2021	Bullets, Bones and Blocked Noses	Kasumi Hōjō	Miniseries	
2021	Kinnikuman: The Lost Legend	Herself		
2025	Alice in Borderland	Rei Morikage	Season 3	

=== Dubbing ===
- The Idol (Jocelyn (Lily-Rose Depp))

== Awards ==
Year	Award	Category	Nominated work(s)	Result	Ref.
2019	44th Hochi Film Awards	Best New Artist	The Flowers of Evil, Diner	Won	
2020	74th Mainichi Film Awards	Best New Actress	The Flowers of Evil	Nominated	
2020	62nd Blue Ribbon Awards	Best Newcomer	The Flowers of Evil, Diner and so on	Nominated	
2022	47th Hochi Film Awards	Best Supporting Actress	By the Window	Nominated	
2023	77th Mainichi Film Awards	Best Supporting Actress	By the Window	Nominated	
