= Wowow =

Japanese satellite TV company and station

Wowow Inc.
- Logo used since 2011

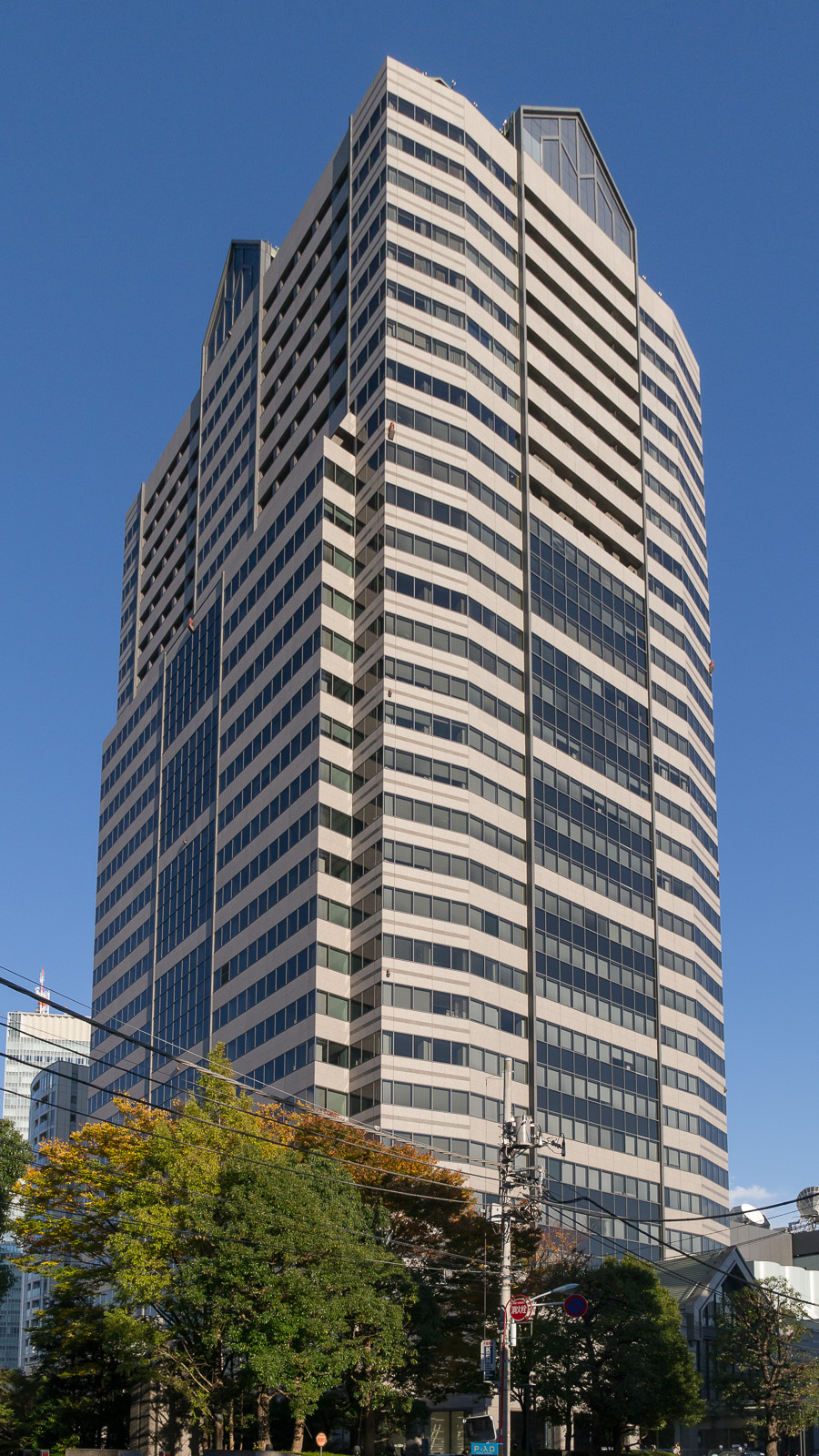
- Headquarters in Minato, Tokyo
- Native name: 株式会社WOWOW
- Romanized name: Kabushiki-gaisha Wauwau
- Formerly: Japan Satellite Broadcasting Co., Ltd. (1984-2000)
- Type: Public
- Traded as: TYO: 4839
- Industry: Media
- Founded: December 25, 1984; 41 years ago
- Headquarters: Akasaka, Minato, Tokyo, Japan
- Subsidiaries: Wowow Entertainment; Wowow Communcations; Wowow Plus
- Website: corporate.wowow.co.jp/en

WOWOW Prime
- Type: Premium television channel
- Country: Japan
- Broadcast area: Japan

Programming
- Language: Japanese
- Picture format: HDTV 1080i

Ownership
- Owner: Wowow, Inc.

History
- Launched: November 29, 1990; 35 years ago (pre-launch); April 1, 1991 (official); December 1, 2000 (digital)
- Closed: July 24, 2011 (analog)
- Former names: WOWOW (1991-2011); Digital WOWOW1 (2000-2011)

Links
- Website: wowow.co.jp (in Japanese)

Wowow (Wauwau; pronounced [waɯwaɯ], stylized in all caps) is a satellite broadcasting and premium satellite television station owned and operated by Wowow Inc. (株式会社WOWOW). Its headquarters are located on the 21st floor of the Akasaka Park Building in Akasaka, Minato, Tokyo. Its broadcasting center is in Koto, Tokyo.

== Overview ==
Wowow was the first 24/7, 3 channel, full high-definition broadcaster in Japan.

The channel's name is a double "Wow", and the three W's also stand for "World-Wide-Watching".

== History ==
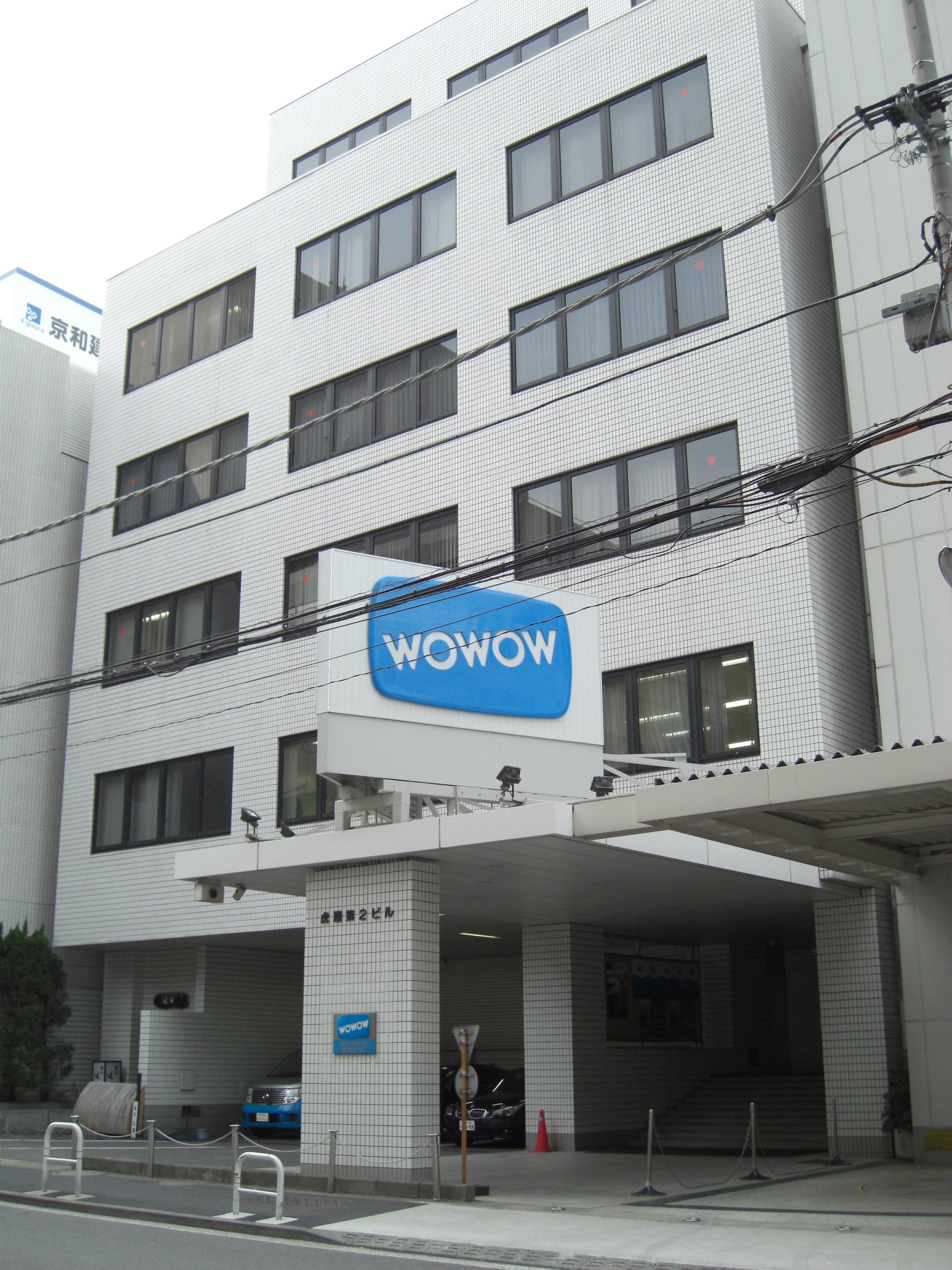
Former Wowow headquarters—Toraya Building 2

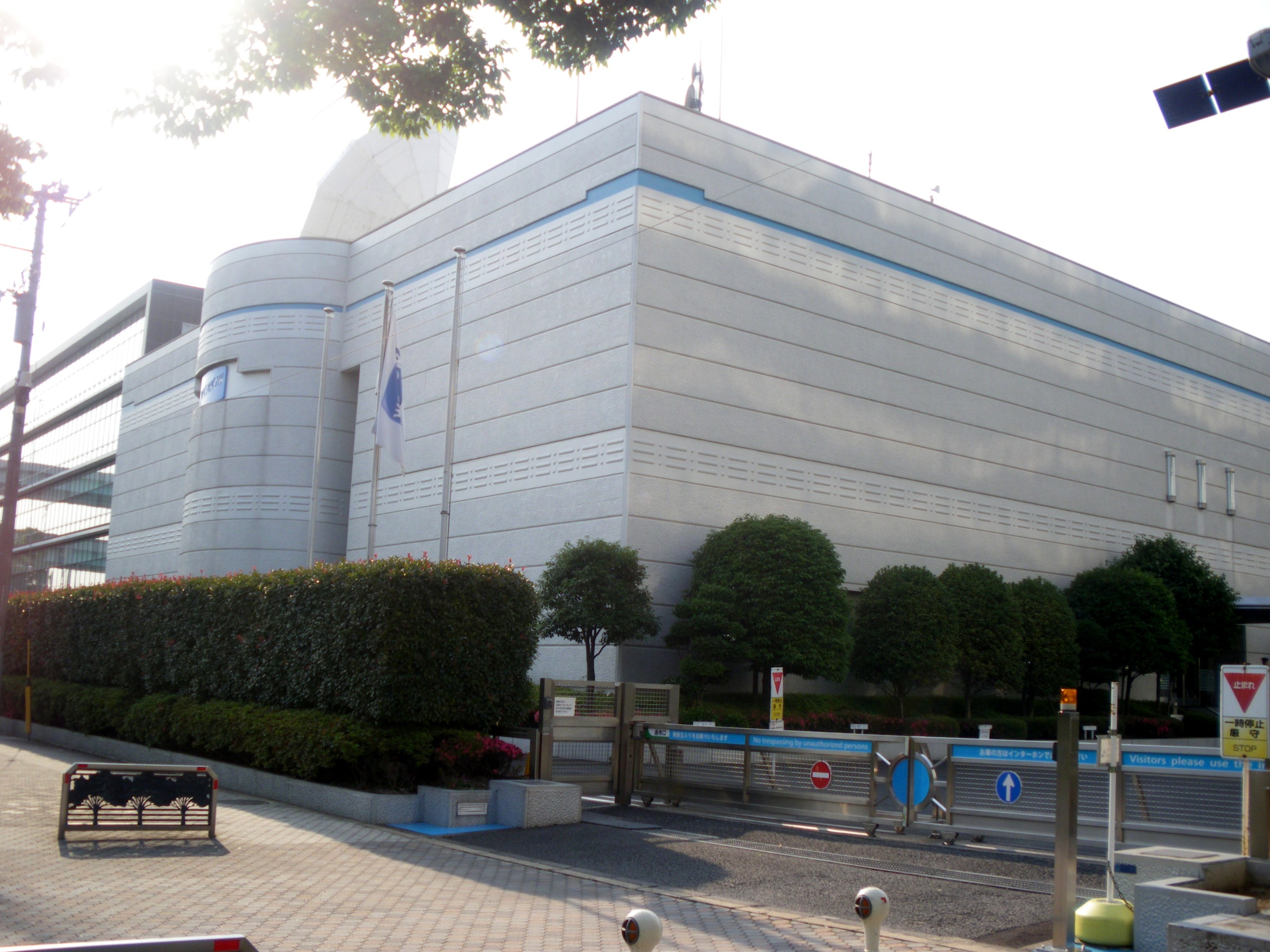
Former Wowow broadcasting center—Tatsumi Koto

Wowow ran a 24-hour test broadcast titled "A Japan-US Two-Way Call-in Show: Space TV Will Change the World" (日米双方向コール・イン・ショー 宇宙テレビが世界を変える) on November 29, 1990, then initiated 12 to 14 hours per day of pre-launch broadcasts the following day. Scrambled programs started airing in February 1991, and regular analog broadcasting began on April 1. One of the channel's first events was investing US$2 million in the filming of The Will Rogers Follies alongside Hollywood producer Pierre Cossette. The goal of the co-production was to bring in more subscribers to the channel, as well as finding a launch hit.

By 1992, Wowow had 800,000 subscribers. At the time, foreign feature films, mainly American, made up 40% of its schedule, and had US actor Harrison Ford as its spokesman. One of its earliest hits was the cult US series Twin Peaks, having aired several cycles of all 28 episodes by July 1992, and was responsible for nearly 30% of new subscriptions.

The network entered fiscal 1993 accumulating a debt of 40 million yen, accused on poor management, and causing delays to the launch of four private competitors.

Digital broadcasting began on December 1, 2000. The network began with 207,753 subscribers (31.5 billion yen in sales), growing to 2,667,414 two years later (64.5 billion yen in sales). As of December 2011, Wowow claimed approximately 2.56 million subscribers to its digital service. On July 24, 2011, Wowow shut down its analog signals.

Previously, Wowow's headquarters were in another facility in Akasaka.

On October 1, 2011, Wowow expanded their single channel broadcast satellite service to provide four high-definition TV channels: Wowow Prime (WOWOWプライム), a general entertainment channel, Wowow Live (WOWOWライブ), covering sports, documentaries, movies and live performances, Wowow Cinema (WOWOWシネマ), a 24-hour movie channel and Wowow Plus. This last channel, formerly known as Cinéfil Wowow, broadcasts on channel 250 and adopted its current name on December 1, 2020.

Wowow also operated a 4K channel which launched in March 2021 and closed on February 28, 2025.

== Programming ==
Wowow mostly rebroadcasts movies, but is also well known for showing (and even co-producing and/or assisting in the production of) original anime series such as The Big O, Brain Powerd, Overman King Gainer, Carried by the Wind: Tsukikage Ran, Trinity Blood, Cowboy Bebop (the complete uncut version), Ghost Hound, Crest of the Stars, Ergo Proxy, X/1999, SHUFFLE!, Paranoia Agent, Now and Then, Here and There, Le Chevalier d'Eon, Shigurui, Berserk, as well as the Anime Complex block. Due to the looser broadcast standards for satellite television in Japan, Wowow has become a primary means of widespread distribution for anime with themes or subject matter that regular broadcast networks cannot show. Several anime studios have partnership deals for distributing their more mature series, with the famed studio Madhouse among them.

Wowow also broadcasts Japanese-dubbed American television series such as Friends, CSI: Crime Scene Investigation, Sex and the City, The Sopranos, Cold Case, Grey's Anatomy, Medium, The 4400, Animaniacs, South Park, and The Simpsons, among others. Wowow has also screened Ultimate Fighting Championship events for Japanese audiences, the British comedy sketch show Little Britain, as well as the British drama/action show Ultimate Force under the name SAS: British Special Forces.

Wowow began producing original live-action TV series in 2003. The series called "Drama W" includes works such as Penance, xxxHolic, The Grand Family, Futagashira and Golden Kamuy: The Hunt of Prisoners in Hokkaido.

=== Sports ===
Wowow has broadcast all four tennis Grand Slam Championships since 2008. They are the Australian Open, the French Open, Wimbledon and the US Open.

Current broadcast lineup

- Australian Open
- French Open
- The Championships, Wimbledon
- US Open
- ATP Tour Masters 1000
- ATP 500 series
- ATP 250 series
- UEFA Euro Championship
- UEFA Champions League
- UEFA Europa League
- UEFA Conference League
- UEFA Super Cup
- "Wowow Excite Match" (Boxing)
- Super Rugby
- LPGA Tour

== President ==
The representative director, president & CEO of Wowow is, as of April 2024, Hitoshi Yamamoto.

== International carriage ==
Under Japanese regulations, Wowow is not legally available outside of Japan. It did have a shadow audience in South Korea and China, where the station's analog beam was accessible. Wowow was one of the 18 channels that as of early 2000 has its coverage in China restricted mostly to foreign compounds.
