= Tsubasa: Reservoir Chronicle season 2 =

Japanese anime series

Tsubasa: Reservoir Chronicle
- Season 2
- Cover of the last Western DVD of the series released by Funimation
- No. of episodes: 26

Release
- Original network: NHK E
- Original release: April 29 – November 4, 2006

Season chronology
- ← Previous; Season 1 Next → Tokyo Revelations

Tsubasa: Reservoir Chronicle, known in Japan as Tsubasa Chronicle (ツバサ･クロニクル, Tsubasa Kuronikuru), is a Japanese anime television series based on the manga series of the same name created by Clamp. The plot follows how Sakura, the princess of the Kingdom of Clow, loses all her memories and how Syaoran, a young archaeologist who is her childhood friend, goes on arduous adventures to save her, with two other companions. The Dimensional Witch Yūko Ichihara instructs him to go with two people, Kurogane and Fai D. Flowright. They search for Sakura's memories, which were scattered in various worlds in the form of angelic-like feathers, as retrieving them will help save her very being.

It was written by Hiroyuki Kawasaki and directed by Kōichi Mashimo, with Hiroshi Morioka joining on as co-director for the second season. The music for the series was composed by Yuki Kajiura. The second season was broadcast in Japan on NHK E from April 29 to November 4, 2006. Two pieces of theme music are used for the second season of the anime series. "It's" performed by Kinya Kotani is the opening theme. "A Jet Waiting For Wind" (風待ちジェット, Kazemachi Jetto) performed by Maaya Sakamoto is the ending theme.

Its episodes were collected in seven DVD between Its episodes were collected in seven DVD between August 25, 2006, and February 23, 2007, in Japan. Funimation released the DVDs in the United States between August 19, 2008, and December 29, 2009. A DVD box was released on January 19, 2010. Madman Entertainment released it in Australia between November 12, 2008, and June 24, 2009.

== Episode list ==
No.	Title	Location	Original release date
27	"Dangerous Race"; Transliteration: "Kiken na Rēsu" (Japanese: 危険なレース)	Piffle World	April 29, 2006
Syaoran and the others land in a futuristic world named Piffle World (ピッフルワールド, Piffuru Wārudo), and they discover that one of Sakura's feathers is the 1st-place prize in a race of airborne vehicles. They enter the race and pass the preliminaries.
28	"The Three Badges"; Transliteration: "Mittsu no Bajji" (Japanese: 三つのバッジ)	Piffle World	May 5, 2006
Tomoyo, owner of the Piffle Princess Company, warns the group that someone is tampering with the Dragonfly Race. The main race begins. Fai is disqualified at the second checkpoint when the rigged Dragon Tube explodes his aircraft. An explosion in the canyons shoots down Ryū-ō's aircraft, and Syaoran intentionally crashes into him in order to save his life.
29	"Goal of Glory"; Transliteration: "Eikō no Gōru" (Japanese: 栄光のゴール)	Piffle World	May 13, 2006
Syaoran and Ryū-ō are both disqualified. Kurogane throws himself in front of an explosion in order to protect Sakura, and is also eliminated. When Fai and Kurogane question Tomoyo about the sabotage, Tomoyo admits that her company had tampered with the preliminaries because she'd wanted Sakura to win so she could get back her feather. Meanwhile, Syaoran and Ryū-ō discover that Tomoyo's secretary was behind the vicious attacks during the main race. They stop him just when he is about to destroy Sakura's aircraft, allowing her to win the race. At the awards ceremony, the Kyle Rondart the group met in Jade world tries to steal the feather. Mokona stops him, but he manages to warp to another dimension. The group then teleports to the next world.
30	"Sorrowful Miracle"; Transliteration: "Kanashii Kiseki" (Japanese: 哀しいキセキ)	Tsarastora Country	May 20, 2006
The group land in a beautiful place named Tsarastora Country (ツァラストラ国, Tsarasutora Kuni). Sakura tells Syaoran what memory she got from the last feather, while Kurogane and Fai talk about how brave Syaoran is. Sakura asks Mokona to call Yūko for her; she then gives her a hand-made dress as a White Day present. The Dimensional Witch reminds Fai, Kurogane, and Syaoran that they still owe her something too. Mokona senses one of Sakura's feathers, and they find it encased in a horn-shaped rock. Syaoran tries to cut it open; they shortly discover that it is the horn of a dragon which starts to attack them. The group discovers that they have returned to the world where Sakura brought back all the people who died trying to get to the top of the temple. They also find out that the god of the temple said that the people who have been brought back to life will die again on the next new moon. After obtaining the feather, they take it to the shrine to try to keep the people who are disappearing alive. However, the god tells them it is not possible, and Sakura receives another one of her memories.
31	"A Young Man's Resolve"; Transliteration: "Shōnen no Ketsui" (Japanese: 少年のケツイ)	Portoria Country	May 27, 2006
The group lands in a new world named Portoria Country (ポルトリア国, Porutoria Kuni) in the middle of the ocean, where they see a ship. Soon they speak to the captain who says that he is short of men and asks them to help him. Syaoran is introduced to a young boy who looks after the ship's engine, and finds out this is a younger version of his father, Fujitaka. Shortly thereafter, huge winds cause massive waves to pummel the ship, and Syaoran and Fujitaka are thrown overboard. They wash up on a deserted island (called Lagosta Island), seemingly in the middle of nowhere. They find some ruins and Syaoran is able to read what is written. The ancient writing warns them of a long, slender being. Meanwhile, Kurogane, Fai, Mokona and Sakura decide to check the island for Syaoran and Fujitaka, who make it through a dangerous cave to get to the other side (and become visible to the ship). As the rescue boat arrives, a long, slender monster attacks them. Kurogane is able to defeat it with one swipe of his sword. The episode ends with Syaoran realizing that the sea monster was what the ruins warned him about.
32	"A Date with a Wizard"; Transliteration: "Majutsushi to Dēto" (Japanese: 魔術師とデート)	Fort City Bit	June 3, 2006
The group arrives in the next world named Fort City Bit (城塞都市ビット, Jōsai Toshi Bitto) only to find its main technique is magic. They go to a cafe where they meet this world's version of Tōya and Yukito. There they learn that once a year everyone in the town has a dream of one person. That person then becomes ruler of the country, with all their previous memories temporarily erased, for the next year. This year, however, it seems that the new Queen has turned the country into a never ending night. This possesses a problem, because all the magic needs sunlight. The group then plans to storm the castle to find out why the queen won't lift the shield. As their luck goes, they get captured and sent to the dungeon. Fai and Sakura manage to run while Syaoran and Kurogane beat off their attackers. Fai and Sakura reach the top floor and stumble into the room of the Queen. It turns out that this world's Queen is Chī; someone who looks like Fai's mother. Chī and Fai manage to escape, but they are being pursued by the guardians of the ruler: Kotoko and Sumomo, as well as their magic guards.
33	"The Origins of Ashura"; Transliteration: "Ashura no Iware" (Japanese: 阿修羅のイワレ)	Shara Country	June 10, 2006
They arrived in Shara Country (紗羅ノ国, Shara no Kuni), to their surprise, they were separated. Syaoran, Sakura and Mokona had been transported into a girl's troupe, while Fai and Kurogane being transported into a shrine which only being run by men. The girl's troupe, called the Suzuran troupe, asks Syaoran and the others to join them. While at the shrine, called the Soseki shrine, Fai and Kurogane had been asked for assistance by the leader of the shrine to protect it. They're then told both of the respective groups about the tale of Ashura and Yasha, the gods of their respective realms. They realize that there is something else to do with the leaders of both shrines.
34	"Endless War"; Transliteration: "Owarinaki Ikusa" (Japanese: 終わりなきイクサ)	Shara Country	June 17, 2006
After witnessing the secret meeting of the two leaders, Sakura says that she feels sorry about their situation and they head to the shrine of Ashura to pray for their happiness. But before they reach the temple however, an earthquake starts up and the whole country shakes. Outside the shrine Sakura glows and opens the door to reveal the Ashura statue surrounded by fire, where Fai and Kurogane are, the Yasha statue is surrounded by ice. As the sky cracks to open into another world, caused by Mokona, the Suzuran troupe arrive and bend over the statue hoping that the earthquake is not Ashura's fault. Her tears fall onto the statue and it flashes and both statues clear the confusion above their heads so that the other world can be seen clearly. Mokona then transfers them into that world, but they are still separate. Sakura and Syaoran end up on a battlefield with a being who is identical to the statue and who bears the same name. She is fighting with Yasha who is accompanied by Fai and Kurogane.
35	"Two Memories"; Transliteration: "Futatsu no Kioku" (Japanese: ふたつのキオク)	Shura Country	June 24, 2006
The group travels to another world named Shura Country (修羅ノ国, Shura no Kuni). They appear in the middle of a battle. The opposing forces seem to only be allowed on the moon where the battle takes place until the moon is at its zenith. Ashura, the king of one of the sides invites Syaoran and Sakura to her castle. Ashura explains that they are fighting over the moon castle because the one who claims it will have their desires granted. Sakura sleeps and Syaoran takes part in another battle where he encounters Fai and Kurogane. After the battle, Sakura kisses Syaoran's painful eye.
36	"Love that Transcends Time"; Transliteration: "Toki o Koeru Omoi" (Japanese: 時をこえるオモイ)	Shura and Shara Country	July 1, 2006
On the moon castle Ashura kills Yasha, he fades away and one of Sakura's feathers is left. Sakura joins him on the castle and Ashura explains to them. Yasha had died a long time ago, the feather created an illusion to replace him. When Ashura and Yasha were fighting, Ashura somehow managed to wound him in his eye even though they were equal. This was because Yasha was ill. One day he came to Shura castle. It was impossible to meet him anywhere but on the moon castle. It was his soul, Yasha had died. He came to say goodbye to Ashura before leaving for the next world. Then the feather came to replace him with a mirage. This was painful for Ashura to see him knowing he had passed away. Ashura returns the feather to Syaoran. They stand up and plunge their sword into the ground to claim the moon castle to grant their wish. The castle simply begins to crumble because their true wish, to have Yasha brought back can never be fulfilled as there is no way to revive the dead. Syaoran and company make it back but Ashura wishes to stay behind. She makes one last wish to the Time-space witch. To have her and Yasha as the gods of the next world, to prove that not even gods can do everything. Syaoran asks the Ashura clan to bury the two together and not apart as he and the others are taken back to Shara. It turns out Fai and Kurogane were pretending to be ones from another world so Syaoran would fight Kurogane to improve his sword skills. They find Shara very different as the two sides are no longer opposing each other, The two statues are together and a wedding is taking place.
37	"Mokona the Artist"; Transliteration: "Oekaki Mokona" (Japanese: おえかきモコナ)	Cartoon World	July 8, 2006
Syaoran and the others arrive in a world where everyone is super deformed; They'd unknowingly teleported to the inside of an enchanted drawing created by an artist using one of Sakura's feathers. Mokona, the only "normal-looking" one, is teleported outside of the picture, and must use the power of the feather pen to draw a story where everyone escapes to the real world. Mayhem ensues in the drawing-world as Mokona's overactive imagination gets the best of her.
38	"Dangerous Road"; Transliteration: "Kiken na Rōdo" (Japanese: 危険なロード)	Principality of Darōga	July 15, 2006
The group arrives in the next world, the Principality of Darōga (ダローガ公国, Darōga Kōkoku), and they suggest that Mokona should give the feather she is holding on to Sakura. However, when Sakura is about to receive the feather, it is blown in the wind, and gets caught on a passing truck. The group then hitches a ride on a tour bus filled with random travelers, whom they all recognize. Each passenger has their own agenda, but all our group wants to do is catch up to the truck ahead of them. At night the bus stops, but a group of gangsters on motorbikes overtake the bus, and threaten to hurt the passengers. Kurogane and Syaoran decide to end their rampage.
39	"The Beginning of a Farewell"; Transliteration: "Hajimari no Wakare" (Japanese: 始まりのワカレ)	Principality of Darōga	July 22, 2006
Kurogane holds back the motorbike gangsters, while Syaoran takes one of the motorbikes. He struggles to get the feather, but the truck continues to accelerate. Meanwhile, Sakura and the others decided to help them by transforming the bus into a war machine. After much trouble, they defeat the gangsters. Syaoran gets the feather when the truck is stopped at the city. The old man on the bus says that everything that has a beginning must have an end. The bus passengers and Syaoran's group realize that they were destined to be met. The passengers wave goodbye at Syaoran and the others as they transport into another world.
40	"Black Steel"; Transliteration: "Kuroki Hagane" (Japanese: 黒き鋼)	Rekord Country	July 29, 2006
The group lands in Rekord Country (レコルト国, Rekoruto Kuni), where Syaoran finds a book with Kurogane's past written in it. The book magically shows him visions of Kurogane's childhood. It reveals that Kurogane was the son of a great provincial lord and a priestess in ancient Japan. After his father died in a demon attack and his sickly mother was subsequently killed by the same person responsible for scattering Sakura's feathers, Princess Tomoyo took Kurogane under her care and nursed him back to health.
41	"Secret of the Library"; Transliteration: "Toshokan no Himitsu" (Japanese: 図書館のヒミツ)	Rekord Country	August 5, 2006
The group finds out that the book Syaoran read is a copy of the original Book of Memories. The cover looks like one of Sakura's feathers. The librarians won't let the gang near the book though. So they decide to take the feather in the original another way. They end up in what is believed to be the Country of Clow.
42	"Faraway Homesickness"; Transliteration: "Bōkyō no Kanata" (Japanese: 望郷のカナタ)	Rekord Country	August 26, 2006
They search the kingdom for any living things that appear. They realized it is just one of Sakura's memories that being visualized by the power of the feather. Syaoran decided to go into the ruins excavation that he had his research on. He found out the wing symbol which is a door that once had taken Sakura's feather may have a secret. Syaoran and Kurogane decided to go deep behind the door and encountered the guardian of the book. While they battling the guardian, Syaoran's right eye makes him go berserk and Syaoran defeats the guardian. He takes the feather out from the book. Kurogane realized there is something wrong is happening to Syaoran. When they come up again, Syaoran gives the feather to Sakura. This triggers the library alarm and they decided to flee from there. Fai uses his 'magic' by whistling, creating the magic barrier in order to protect them and enabling Mokona to transport them into another world. To their surprise, they ended up in Rekord Country. This anime episode is different from the manga which actually this event leads to Tokyo Arc (Tsubasa Tokyo Revelations).
43	"The Fifth Oath"; Transliteration: "Itsutsume no Chikai" (Japanese: 五つ目のチカイ)	Rekord Country	September 2, 2006
Syaoran and the others are trying to find the way out from the librarian guards. They decided to hide in the library as no one will expect them to be there. But their expectation was wrong because their location can be found by sensing the feathers' power. Kurogane wants to use the Book of Memories on Syaoran to discover his past, but through a mix-up, Syaoran ends up seeing more of Kurogane's past: as he vowed his fifth oath to Princess Tomoyo when she gave the Ginryū to him. The oath is to protect the person that is precious to him no matter what. Kurogane keeps that oath and, together with Syaoran and Fai, they defeat the guard. In the end, the Rekord Country ruler thanks them for getting rid of the feather and they apologize for causing so much trouble. Syaoran and the others transport into another world after saying goodbye to the people of Rekord Country. This episode and the rest of the Season 2 episodes do not happen in the manga.
44	"Kero and Mokona"; Transliteration: "Kero-chan to Mokona" (Japanese: ケロちゃんとモコナ)	Kero World	September 9, 2006
Shortly after arriving on a new world Syaoran and the gang go to sleep for the night. When they wake up they end up with a small problem. Everyone except Mokona is only an inch tall. When they are almost stepped on by Mokona, Kero, the guardian deity of the world saves them. Kero explains that a while back a feather fell from the sky and landed on a mountain nearby and that this feather makes all humans in the world tiny. Since Syaoran and the gang are too small to make a journey up the mountain, Kero and Mokona must travel up the mountain and retrieve Sakura's feather.
45	"The Second Hardship"; Transliteration: "Nidome no Kunan" (Japanese: 二度目のクナン)	Koryo Country	September 16, 2006
The group arrives back in Koryo Country (ナユタヤ国, Nayutaya Kuni), where they meet Chu'nyan again. To their surprise, the country has yet another new threat. Syaoran investigates this matter and discovers that people are turning to stone by some magic. The culprits appear to be Kiishimu's people. The people of Koryo Country shun Chu'nyan because she defends Kiishimu. In order to clear her name, Chu'nyan joins Syaoran and the others to investigate the culprits behind this incident.
46	"The Secret of Hijutsu"; Transliteration: "Hijutsu no Gokui" (Japanese: 秘術のゴクイ)	Kiishimu Country	September 23, 2006
Kīshim tells them that besides Koryo Country, there is another hidden country that is parallel to Koryo known as Kiishimu Country (キィシムの国, Kīshimu no Kuni). The gate to go to the opposite world is at the river below the bridge, the same place where Sakura was possessed by Chu'nyan's mother. Kiishimu said that gate is the best because it has so many auras of hijutsu surrounded the area. When they are transported into Kiishimu Country, they realize the people of Kiishimu are being controlled by some device. They battling the guards and uncover the real culprit which is son of the Ryanban which rule Koryo Country before, possessing the power of the feather. Syaoran defeat him and takes the feather from his hand. He is then punished by Kiishimu. Kiishimu claims her rightful place as the ruler of Kiishimu Country. She told Chu'nyan that she had a great battle with her mother on the top of the bridge and admired Chu'nyan's mother for her great skill and heart of hijutsu. She also told Chu'nyan that the greatest magic of all is love. Chu'nyan promised herself to protect her country with her hijutsu she has and always help people that needed both on Koryo Country and Kiishimu Country. Chu'nyan thanks them again for their help and the group begins to transport into another world.
47	"Sakura Works"; Transliteration: "Hataraku Sakura" (Japanese: はたらくサクラ)	Ragtime World	September 30, 2006
The group lands in the next world, Ragtime World (ラグタイムワールド, Ragutaimu Wārudo), and find that Sakura's feather is being sold at a shop as a brooch. Since the group has no money, they must find jobs in order to earn the 100,000 Yules (Ragtime World's currency) to pay for it and the owner reserves the feather for the group for 3 days. They find however, that jobs are scarce in this city due to a recession. Syaoran, Fai and Kurogane go out to find a job but have no luck. Sakura and Mokona venture out on their own and Sakura manages to find a job working at a restaurant shack called The King's Bistro since she has experience from The Cat's Eye. However the power suddenly failed and the shop had to let Sakura go. She moves on to a transport company without much success. Finally, she gets a job as a waitress in a shady bar where the clientele are very friendly. The bar however, is under threat from a gang who want to take it over. As the gang attack, Syaoran, Fai and Kurogane defeat them as they have been hired as special guards by the owner. Together the group raised enough money to buy the feather for Sakura.
48	"Feather-King Chaos"; Transliteration: "Haō Kaosu" (Japanese: 羽王カオス)	Tao Country	October 7, 2006
Syaoran and the others arrived in another world named Tao Country ruled by King Chaos. Everyone in this kingdom had magical power, called senriki, which enables them to fly and do wondrous things. Their arrival had been expected by King Chaos and they were invited to his castle. They noticed King Chaos had a fan made from Sakura's feather. King Chaos told them that this feather is from the mystical bird that lives far in the corner of the kingdom. Syaoran decided to search the mystical bird along with his companions, Fai and Kurogane.
49	"A Warped Wish"; Transliteration: "Yuganda Negai" (Japanese: 歪んだネガイ)	Tao Country	October 14, 2006
Sakura had a dream that show her childhood in Clow Kingdom. Suddenly, she was attacked by giant worm. Luckily, she was rescued by a man in a cloak. The man shows his face and introduces himself as Chaos. Sakura asks him where he lives or where he came from. Chaos told her that he lives in another kingdom and has power to cross dimensions. Sakura asks him to convince her brother to let her travel when she is older. Chaos tells her that when she is allowed to travel he will be her companion and will protect her with his life. Syaoran, Kurogane, and Fai are fighting their old memories when Chaos decides he will beat all three of them to show Sakura how weak they are compared to him.
50	"Determined Friends"; Transliteration: "Ketsui no Nakama" (Japanese: 決意のナカマ)	Tao Country	October 21, 2006
After Syaoran, Kurogane, and Fai lose to Chaos, he uses one of his powers to make an unwilling Sakura go with him. But as he is about to go to another world, Sakura starts to cry and he says it is useless to travel with her until she changes her heart. While knocked out, Syaoran has a dream about his other self. He then wakes up and tells Kurogane and Fai that he thinks Sakura would be better to travelling with Chaos instead. Fai tells Syaoran that maybe for once he should try being selfish instead of doing what he thinks is best for Sakura. Kurogane calls Yūko and asks her to lend him Ginryū but she says it is not a request she can complete so instead he gives Syaoran his sword and Fai gives Syaoran a magic potion to heal his wounds. Mokona kisses everyone but Syaoran and tells him that he will get his kiss when he brings back Sakura.
51	"A Frozen Spirit"; Transliteration: "Itetsuku Mitama" (Japanese: 凍てつくミタマ)	Tao Country	October 28, 2006
Syaoran goes and trains with Kurogane. Fai and Mokona break into the castle to see Sakura. But when they get there, they see the feathers that she was given come back out of her body, black, not white feathers. Mokona tells Sakura and Fai the feathers are fake and Sakura scolds Chaos for trying to control her with fake memories. Chaos sends a challenge to Syaoran. Sakura asks Mokona to tell Syaoran that he doesn't have to worry about her, so not to overexert himself. Syaoran goes to the castle to fight Chaos, but after Syaoran throws Chaos' lightning attack back at him, Chaos freezes Sakura's body and soul. Chaos then transforms into that of a giant bird.
52	"Wings Toward Tomorrow"; Transliteration: "Asu e no Tsubasa" (Japanese: 明日へのツバサ)	Tao Country	November 4, 2006
The battle between Syaoran and the Chaos-bird begins just when Fei Wong Reed tries to take Syaoran over with his other self. Sakura is unfrozen and Syaoran's other self closes his eye. Syaoran is given his fixed sword back, and he then combines both his and Kurogane's swords into a larger sword and defeats Chaos. Chaos turns into a bunch of Sakura's feathers and reveals he was created from them long ago. Mokona tells them there are still tons more feathers out there.

== Home media release ==
Japanese

Title	Release date	Episodes
Tsubasa Chronicle Second Series I (ツバサ·クロニクル 第2シリーズ I, Tsubasa Kuronikuru Dai ni Shirīzu I)	August 25, 2006	27-28
Tsubasa Chronicle Second Series II (ツバサ·クロニクル 第2シリーズ II, Tsubasa Kuronikuru Dai ni Shirīzu II)	September 22, 2006	29-32
Tsubasa Chronicle Second Series III (ツバサ·クロニクル 第2シリーズ III, Tsubasa Kuronikuru Dai ni Shirīzu III)	October 27, 2006	33-36
Tsubasa Chronicle Second Series IV (ツバサ·クロニクル 第2シリーズ IV, Tsubasa Kuronikuru Dai ni Shirīzu IV)	November 24, 2006	37-40
Tsubasa Chronicle Second Series V (ツバサ·クロニクル 第2シリーズ V, Tsubasa Kuronikuru Dai ni Shirīzu V)	December 22, 2006	41-44
Tsubasa Chronicle Second Series VI (ツバサ·クロニクル 第2シリーズ VI, Tsubasa Kuronikuru Dai ni Shirīzu VI)	January 26, 2007	45-48
Tsubasa Chronicle Second Series VII (ツバサ·クロニクル 第2シリーズ VII, Tsubasa Kuronikuru Dai ni Shirīzu VII)	February 23, 2007	49-52

United States

Title	Release date	E
Tsubasa: Reservoir Chronicle Volume 7 - The Dangerous Pursuit (including Season 2 Starter Set)	August 19, 2008	27-28
Tsubasa: Reservoir Chronicle Volume 8 - A Tragic Illusion	September 30, 2008	29-32
Tsubasa: Reservoir Chronicle Volume 9 - Renegades and Strays	November 11, 2008	33-36
Tsubasa: Reservoir Chronicle Volume 10 - Answers Without Questions	December 23, 2008	37-40
Tsubasa: Reservoir Chronicle Volume 11 - On the Brink of Chaos	February 3, 2009	41-44
Tsubasa: Reservoir Chronicle Volume 12 - The Soul of Memory	March 17, 2009	45-48
Tsubasa: Reservoir Chronicle Season 2 Boxset	December 29, 2009	49-52
Tsubasa: Reservoir Chronicle Collected Memories Box Set	January 19, 2010	1-52; Movie

Australia

Title	Release date	E
Tsubasa: Reservoir Chronicle Volume 7 - The Dangerous Pursuit (including Season 2 Starter Set)	November 12, 2008	27-28
Tsubasa: Reservoir Chronicle Volume 8 - A Tragic Illusion	January 14, 2009	29-32
	33-36	
Tsubasa Chronicles (TV) V09	March 18, 2009	37-40
Tsubasa Chronicles (TV) V10	April 15, 2009	41-44
Tsubasa, Vol. 11: Reservoir Chronicles - At the Brink of Chaos	February 3, 2009	45-48
Tsubasa Chronicles (TV) V12	June 24, 2009	49-52
Tsubasa Chronicles (TV) Season 2 Collection	December 16, 2009	27-52
