= List of Tsubasa: Reservoir Chronicle albums =

Tsubasa: Reservoir Chronicle discography
- Studio albums: 2
- Soundtrack albums: 4
- Compilation albums: 1
- Singles: 8
- Drama CDs: 6

Tsubasa: Reservoir Chronicle is a fantasy adventure manga series written by Clamp that is currently serializing in Kodansha's Weekly Shōnen Magazine which began publication in 2003. Set in a multiverse, its storyline follows a group of five travelers as they journey across the dimensions in search of Sakura's memories. It was adapted by Bee Train into a fifty-two episode anime television series directed by Kōichi Mashimo and partly by Hiroshi Morioka with music direction by Toru Nakano. The first season was broadcast in 2005 spanning twenty-six episodes. Production I.G adapted the series into an anime film directed by Itsuro Kawasaki and music direction by Kazuhiro Iwabayashi, that premiered in 2006. The second season of the anime series followed the film in 2006 spanning the last twenty-six episodes. Production I.G. adapted an additional two OVA series directed by Shunsuke Tada with music direction for the first OVA by Masafumi Mima that aired between 2007 and 2009 spanning five episodes in total. The discography for these adaptations consist of four soundtrack albums, one compilation album, eight maxi singles, two studio albums, and three drama CDs.

The core of the discography is the four soundtrack albums released by Victor Entertainment between 2005 and 2006, which together contain the original soundtrack for both seasons of the anime television series. The lyrics, arrangement, and composition for the soundtrack albums are provided by Yuki Kajiura who has provided the background music for anime series such as Madlax, Noir, and .hack//SIGN. The eight maxi singles released by both Victor Entertainment and R and C Limited between 2005 and 2006 and two studio albums released by Victor Entertainment during 2009 each contain one piece of theme music used in the various adaptations of the manga series. A vocal compilation album collecting various songs from the studio albums, maxi singles, and drama CDs released between 2005 and 2006.

Three drama CDs have been released by Victor Entertainment between 2005 and 2006 featuring dialogue between the characters from Tsubasa: Reservoir Chronicle voiced by their respective voice actors as well as theme music provided by various artists and performed by a varying combination of the series' five protagonists. Another three drama CDs have been released between 2006 and 2007, with a fourth to be released in 2009, that follow a spin-off storyline featuring characters from both Tsubasa: Reservoir Chronicle and its sister manga series, xxxHolic.

== Concept and creation ==
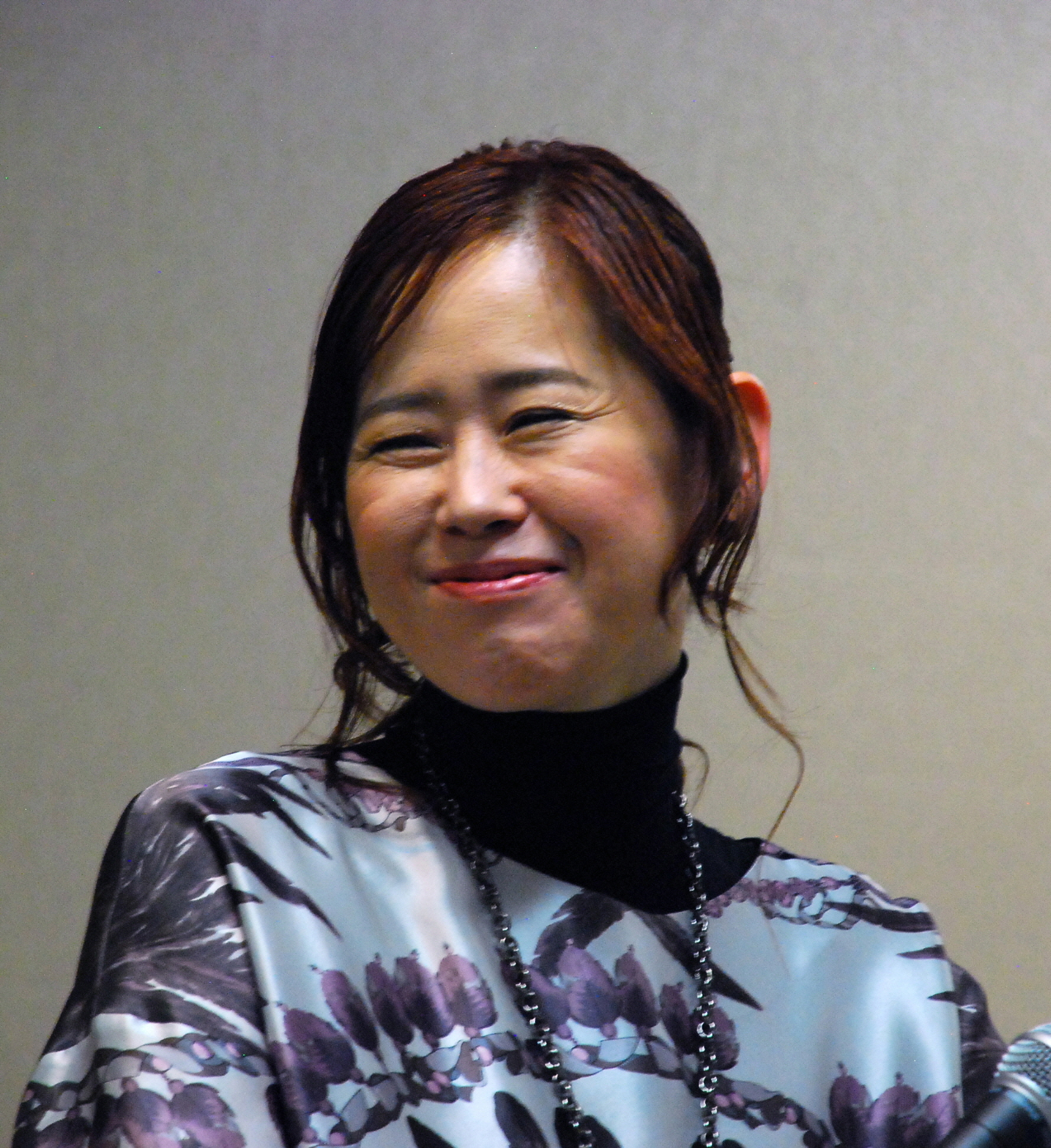
Composer Yuki Kajiura

When watching Tsubasa Chronicle, Maaya Sakamoto felt that Syaoran's straightforward feelings and strength to protect Sakura were very touching. Within "Kazemachi Jet", the ending theme of second season of the anime television series Tsubasa Chronicle, she tried to capture the image of Syaoran growing from his "naive" self into a young man as a result of experiencing the repetition of meetings and partings over his journey and Syaoran continuing to try to protect his loved one in spite of the mishaps along the way. In "Spica", an insert song into Tsubasa Chronicle that was sold alongside "Kazemachi Jet", she tried to capture the Sakura's feminine and maternal strength as one with courage to continually move forward despite the odds but also ability to show weakness at times. In "Saigo no Kajitsu", the ending of the OVA series Tsubasa Tokyo Revelations, she worked once more with Shōko Suzuki whom she had been with for three years prior and thus was very comfortable working with. She described having created the song as beginning quietly and building up into a magnificent and dramatic song as a wave washes over the surface of still water. She wrote its lyrics trying to capture the feelings of the characters who learn that the Syaoran whom they had been traveling with was in reality a copy and their desire to continue to choose their own future despite knowing the reason why Syaoran was cloned and what they would face by choosing to continuing their journey.

Kinya Kotani has been a fan of Clamp's work for quite some time and was extremely happy when he could take part in creating the theme music for adaptations of the group's work. When Kinya Kotani wrote the lyrics for the theme music for Tsubasa Chronicle and the anime film Tsubasa Chronicle the Movie: The Princess of the Country of Birdcages as if he were Syaoran. Kotani had to deliver both "Blaze" and "Aerial"—the opening themes for the first season of the anime series and the opening for the anime film respectively—on a tight schedule. When first creating "Aerial", he described always having the word "aerial" in his mind. He wrote the lyrics by comparing the universe of Tsubasa Chronicle with the everything that he had written so far. When creating the opening theme song "It's" for the second season of the anime, he tried to capture the sad feel of Syaoran's strength in his singing; he tried to create a clear image of Syaoran's feelings in writing the song's lyrics, both Syaoran's forwarding-facing and backward-facing characteristics. The music was designed to be simple but deep, conveying a sense of something missed and of something new. Kotani feels that "It's" is a song that conveys the feeling of one's back being propelled into a journey. For the film Yuki Kajiura was asked to create a score different from the one used in TV series in order to convey characters' states of mind. Producer Tetsuya Natakate was satisfied with the result, as Kajiura's music ended being what he hoped.

== Season 1 ==
=== "Blaze" ===
"Blaze" is a maxi single performed by Kinya Kotani first released on June 22, 2005, by R and C under the catalog number YRCN-10092. The lyrics, composition, and arrangement for the single are provided by Kinya Kotani, Nieve, and HΛL. It contains 3 tracks in regular and instrumental versions. The track "Blaze" is featured as the opening theme to the first season of the anime series Tsubasa Chronicle. Its B-side is titled "Refraction". Lesley Smith of Anime Fringe described "Blaze" as "an upbeat example of J-pop at its finest". It peak ranked 19th on the Oricon singles chart and remained on the chart for five weeks.

=== "Loop" ===
"Loop" (ループ, Rūpu) is a maxi single performed by Maaya Sakamoto first released on May 11, 2005, by Victor Entertainment under the catalog number VICL-35791. The lyrics, composition, and arrangement for the single are provided by h's, Maaya Sakamoto, h-wonder, and Takeshi Nakatsuka. It contains 4 tracks in regular and instrumental versions and covers a duration of 18:08. The track "Loop" was featured as the ending theme to the first season of the anime series Tsubasa Chronicle. Its B-side is titled "High Touch" (ハイタッチ, Hai Tacchi). Lesley Smith of Anime Fringe described "Loop" as "a powerful ballad, with slight Celtic overtones and a gorgeous melody". It peak ranked 7th on the Oricon singles chart and remained on the chart for nine weeks.

=== Future Soundscape I ===
Future Soundscape I is one of the four soundtrack albums for the anime television series Tsubasa Chronicle. The lyrics, composition, and arrangement for the album are provided by Yuki Kajiura except for the included pieces of theme music. It features the opening and ending themes for the first season as well as English versions of two of Sakura's image songs: "You Are My Love" performed by Eri Itō and "Yume no Tsubasa" (titled "Tsubasa" for this album) performed by FictionJunction KAORI. It spans 20 tracks and covers a duration of 54:59. It was first released on July 6, 2005, by Victor Entertainment with the catalog number VICL-61661. The limited edition of the album was released on the same day by Victor Entertainment with the catalog number VIZL-137 that features a wide book-case design showing Syaoran holding a golden staff and a pen with Sakura's feather attached to its end.

It peak ranked 39th on the Oricon albums chart and remained on the chart for three weeks. Lesley Smith from webzine Anime Fringe praised it as "a beautiful CD" that has "enchanting" music and "amazing vocals", "round[ing] off ... nicely" with the track "Loop". She praised the music as having a unique fusion of different instruments and giving creating an image or impression appropriate to how it was used in the anime, noting that the female choral back some of the best pieces of the track. However, she criticized "You Are My Love" for being sung badly.

Track listing
No.	Title	Music	Performance	Length
1.	"Ship of Fools"	Yuki Kajiura	Eri Itō	3:42
2.	"Blaze" (TV size)	Nieve & HΛL	Kinya Kotani	1:42
3.	"Believe"	Yuki Kajiura		1:49
4.	"Black Sword"	Yuki Kajiura		2:51
5.	"Strange Names"	Yuki Kajiura		1:47
6.	"Break the Sword of Justice"	Yuki Kajiura		2:04
7.	"You Are My Love"	Yuki Kajiura	Eri Itō	2:34
8.	"Dewdrops"	Yuki Kajiura		3:47
9.	"Tsubasa" (lit. wings)	Yuki Kajiura	FictionJunction KAORI	4:37
10.	"A Tiny Sunshine"	Yuki Kajiura		1:57
11.	"Through the Gate"	Yuki Kajiura		2:06
12.	"Hear Our Prayer"	Yuki Kajiura		2:57
13.	"I Talk to the Rain"	Yuki Kajiura	Eri Itō	3:09
14.	"Ruthless"	Yuki Kajiura		2:54
15.	"Guess How Much I Love You"	Yuki Kajiura		2:09
16.	"Morning Moon"	Yuki Kajiura		2:32
17.	"Witch"	Yuki Kajiura		3:27
18.	"A Song of Storm and Fire"	Yuki Kajiura	Eri Itō	4:02
19.	"Best Years in Our Lives"	Yuki Kajiura		3:08
20.	"Loop (TV size)" (ループ Rūpu)	h-wonder	Maaya Sakamoto	1:34

=== Future Soundscape II ===
Future Soundscape II is one of the four soundtrack albums for the anime television series Tsubasa Chronicle. The lyrics, composition, and arrangement for the album are provided by Yuki Kajiura. It features performance by Eri Itō, FictionJunction KEIKO, and Makino Yui. The album features two character image songs: Oruha's image song titled "Kaze no Machi e" (風の街へ) performed by FictionJunction KEIKO and Sakura's original image song titled "Yume no Tsubasa" performed by Yui Makino as Sakura. It spans 18 tracks and covers a duration of 51:57. It was first released on September 22, 2005, by Victor Entertainment under the catalog number VICL-61662. The limited edition of the album was released on the same day by Victor Entertainment under the catalog number VIZL-145, featuring a notebook titled "Tsubasa Note". It peak ranked 92nd on the Oricon albums chart and remained on the chart for two weeks.

Track listing
No.	Title	Music	Performance	Length
1.	"Voices Silently Sing"	Yuki Kajiura	Eri Itō	3:49
2.	"Endlessly"	Yuki Kajiura	Eri Itō	3:31
3.	"Storm and Fire"	Yuki Kajiura		2:10
4.	"Lost Wings"	Yuki Kajiura		1:58
5.	"Together for Tomorrow"	Yuki Kajiura		2:00
6.	"The Dreamers"	Yuki Kajiura		2:18
7.	"Before the Storm"	Yuki Kajiura		1:00
8.	"Breathless"	Yuki Kajiura		2:48
9.	"Kaze no Machi e" (風の街へ, To the City of Wind)	Yuki Kajiura	FictionJunction KEIKO	5:01
10.	"Wayside"	Yuki Kajiura		1:49
11.	"You Are My Love"	Yuki Kajiura	Yui Makino	2:34
12.	"1&0 City"	Yuki Kajiura		2:15
13.	"Catastrophe"	Yuki Kajiura		4:08
14.	"Fatigue"	Yuki Kajiura		1:49
15.	"Break It Down Again"	Yuki Kajiura		2:56
16.	"When Two Powers Collide"	Yuki Kajiura		4:09
17.	"Blue Clouds"	Yuki Kajiura		3:00
18.	"Yume no Tsubasa" (ユメノツバサ, Wings of Dreams)	Yuki Kajiura	Yui Makino	4:34

== Tsubasa Chronicle the Movie: The Princess of the Country of Birdcages ==
=== Aerial ===
"Aerial" is a maxi single performed by Kinya Kotani first released on August 17, 2005, by R and C under the catalog number YRCN-10108. The lyrics, composition, and arrangement for the single are provided by Kinya Kotani and HΛL. It contains 3 tracks in both regular and instrumental versions. The track "Aerial" was featured as the opening theme to the anime film Tsubasa Chronicle the Movie: The Princess of the Country of Birdcages. Its B-side is titled "Season". It peak ranked 45th on the Oricon singles chart and remained on the chart for three weeks.

=== "Amrita" ===
"Amrita" (アムリタ, Amurita) is a maxi single performed by Yui Makino first released on August 18, 2005, by Victor Entertainment under the catalog number VICL-35846. The lyrics, composition, and arrangement for the single are provided by Caoli Cano, Yui Makino, Tetsushi Fujita, Taguchi Toshi, and Sonic Dove. It contains 4 tracks in both regular and instrumental versions. Its B-Sides are titled "You Are My Love" and "Jasmine" (ジャスミン, Jasumin). The song "Amrita" was featured as the ending theme to the second season of the anime film Tsubasa Chronicle the Movie: The Princess of the Country of Birdcages. It peak ranked 53rd on the Oricon singles chart and remained on the chart for five weeks.

== Season 2 ==
=== "It's" ===
"It's" is a maxi single performed by Kinya Kotani first released on May 24, 2006, by R and C under the catalog number YRCN-10138. The lyrics, composition, and arrangement for the single are provided by Taguchi Toshi, Mikio Sakai, Ayuko Akiyama, and Teppei Shimizu. It contains 3 tracks in both regular and instrumental versions. The track "It's" was featured as the opening theme to the second season of the anime series Tsubasa Chronicle. The single's B-side is titled "Skid Mark" (スキッドマーク, Sukiddo Māku) It peak ranked 63rd on the Oricon singles chart and remained on the chart for three weeks.

=== "Kazemachi Jet / Spica" ===
"Kazemachi Jet / Spica" (風待ちジェット/スピカ, lit. Jet Waiting for Wind) is a double A-side maxi single performed by Maaya Sakamoto first released on June 14, 2006, by Victor Entertainment under the catalog number VICL-36059. The lyrics, composition, and arrangement for the single are provided by Maaya Sakamoto, Shōko Suzuki, Takehiro Iida, h-wonder, and Udai Shika. It contains 4 tracks in both regular and instrumental versions. The A-side track "Kazemachi Jet" was featured as the ending theme while the second A-side track "Spica" was featured as an insert to episode 43 of the second season of the anime series Tsubasa Chronicle and were meant to represent the perspectives of the two protagonists of Tsubasa: Reservoir Chronicle, Syaoran and Sakura respectively. It peak ranked 14th on the Oricon singles chart and remained on the chart for six weeks.

=== Future Soundscape III ===
Future Soundscape III is one of the four soundtrack albums for the anime television series Tsubasa Chronicle. The lyrics, composition, and arrangement for the album are provided by Yuki Kajiura except the pieces of theme music featured in the second season of the anime. It features the short versions of the opening and ending themes for the second season of the anime as well as performance by Eri Itō and FictionJunction KAORI. It was first released on July 5, 2006, by Victor Entertainment under the catalog number VICL-61966. The limited edition of the album was released on the same day by Victor Entertainment under the catalog number VIZL-189, featuring a mini clear pouch and a wide book-case design. It peak ranked 83rd on the Oricon albums chart and remained on the chart for two weeks.

Track listing
No.	Title	Music	Performance	Length
1.	"Moebius"	Yuki Kajiura	Eri Itō	2:47
2.	"It's (TV size)"	Mikio Sakai & Ayuko Akiyama	Kinya Kotani	1:31
3.	"We Go Further, Everyday"	Yuki Kajiura		2:26
4.	"Slipstream"	Yuki Kajiura		2:26
5.	"Fireseeker"	Yuki Kajiura		2:29
6.	"Femme"	Yuki Kajiura		2:32
7.	"Masquerade"	Yuki Kajiura		2:02
8.	"Play the Game"	Yuki Kajiura		2:47
9.	"Sacrifice"	Yuki Kajiura	Eri Itō	2:43
10.	"Afterglow"	Yuki Kajiura		1:22
11.	"Dream Scape"	FictionJunction KAORI	FictionJunction KAORI	5:09
12.	"Sword Breaker"	Yuki Kajiura		2:43
13.	"Need Your Love"	Yuki Kajiura		2:32
14.	"Siren Song"	Yuki Kajiura	Eri Itō	2:37
15.	"Total Eclipse"	Yuki Kajiura		2:27
16.	"Stay"	Yuki Kajiura		3:06
17.	"Indian Summer"	Yuki Kajiura		2:54
18.	"Antinomie"	Yuki Kajiura		1:52
19.	"Further"	Yuki Kajiura		1:54
20.	"Wings of Your Imagination"	Yuki Kajiura		2:39
21.	"Kazemachi Jet (TV size)" (風待ちジェット Kazemachi Jetto, Jet Waiting for Wind)	Shōko Suzuki & Takehiro Iida	Maaya Sakamoto	1:37
22.	"Storm Is Coming"	Yuki Kajiura		1:21

=== Future Soundscape IV ===
Future Soundscape IV is one of the four soundtrack albums for the anime television series Tsubasa Chronicle. The lyrics, composition, and arrangement for the album are provided by Yuki Kajiura except the pieces of theme music featured in the first season of the anime. It features performance by Eri Itō and FictionJunction Yuuka. It spans 20 tracks and covers a duration of 58:21. It was first released on September 21, 2006, by Victor Entertainment under the catalog number VICL-62084. The limited edition of the album was released on the same day by Victor Entertainment under the catalog number VIZL-203, featuring came with a mousepad and housed in a special package. It peak ranked 80th on the Oricon albums chart and remained on the chart for one week.

Track listing
No.	Title	Music	Performance	Length
1.	"Once Upon a Time There Was You and Me"	Yuki Kajiura	Eri Itō	5:56
2.	"Aikoi" (lit. Love)	FictionJunction Yuuka	FictionJunction Yuuka	4:40
3.	"My Dear Feather"	Yuki Kajiura	Eri Itō	4:55
4.	"Merrymaking"	Yuki Kajiura		2:04
5.	"Little One, So Sweet"	Yuki Kajiura		1:46
6.	"You Shall Overcome"	Yuki Kajiura		2:30
7.	"Prove Yourself"	Yuki Kajiura	Eri Itō	3:20
8.	"Let Go"	Yuki Kajiura		2:25
9.	"Rainbow"	Yuki Kajiura		2:09
10.	"Broken Sword of Justice"	Yuki Kajiura		2:35
11.	"Darkness Comes"	Yuki Kajiura		1:54
12.	"Dawn"	Yuki Kajiura		2:16
13.	"Uninvited Guest"	Yuki Kajiura		2:38
14.	"Requiem for the Evil"	Yuki Kajiura	Eri Itō	2:57
15.	"Longingly"	Yuki Kajiura		2:09
16.	"Run for Your Life"	Yuki Kajiura		2:26
17.	"Optimistic"	Yuki Kajiura	Eri Itō	3:41
18.	"A Whip and a Witch"	Yuki Kajiura		3:03
19.	"Crying Alone"	Yuki Kajiura		2:21
20.	"Ring Your Song"	Yuki Kajiura	Eri Itō	2:26

== Tsubasa Tokyo Revelations ==
=== "Synchronicity" ===
"Synchronicity" is a maxi single performed by Yui Makino first released on November 21, 2007, by Victor Entertainment under the catalog number VTCL-35007. The lyrics, composition, and arrangement for the single are provided by Yuki Kajiura, Makino Yui, Caoli Cano and Shunsuke Takizawa. It contains 3 tracks in both regular and instrumental versions. The track "Synchronicity" was featured as the opening theme to the OVA adaptation Tsubasa Tokyo Revelations. Its B-side is titled "Amrita: Hikigatari" (アムリタ -弾き語り-; lit. Amurita: Self-Accompaniment). Its peak ranked 49th on the Oricon singles chart and remained on the chart for three weeks.

=== "Saigo no Kajitsu / Mitsubachi to Kagakusha" ===
"Saigo no Kajitsu / Mitsubachi to Kagakusha" (さいごの果実/ミツバチと科学者; lit. Last Fruit / The Honeybee and the Scientist) is a maxi single performed by Maaya Sakamoto first released on November 21, 2007, by Victor Entertainment under the catalog number VTCL-35008. The lyrics, composition, and arrangement for the single are provided by Maaya Sakamoto, Shōko Suzuki, Neko Saito, and Solaya. It contains 5 tracks in regular, short, and instrumental versions and covers a duration 19:48. The track "Last Fruit" is featured as the ending theme to the OVAs Tsubasa Tokyo Revelations. It peak ranked 19th on the Oricon singles chart and remained on the chart for seven weeks.

== Tsubasa Shunraiki ==
=== Kazeyomi ===
Kazeyomi (かぜよみ; lit. Wind Reading) is a studio album performed by Maaya Sakamoto first released on January 14, 2009, by Victor Entertainment bearing the catalog number VTCL-60085. The limited edition of the album was released on the same day by Victor Entertainment bearing the catalog number VTZL-8 that includes a bonus region 2 DVD featuring three music videos. It contains 14 tracks. The track "Sonic Boom" is featured as the opening theme to the OVA series Tsubasa Shunraiki. It peak ranked 3rd on the Oricon albums chart and remained on the chart for seven weeks.

Kazeyomi
No.	Title	Lyrics	Music	Arrangement	Length
1.	"Vento"	Mina Kubota	Mina Kubota	Mina Kubota
2.	"Triangular" (トライアングラー Toraiangurā)	Gabriela Robin	Shōko Suzuki	Shōko Suzuki
3.	"Kazemachi Jet ~ Kazeyomi edition" (風待ちジェット〜kazeyomi edition)	Maaya Sakamoto	Yoko Kanno	Yoko Kanno
4.	"Remedy"	Maaya Sakamoto	Solaya	Solaya
5.	"Ame ga Furu" (雨が降る)	Maaya Sakamoto	Caoli Cano	Neko Saito
6.	"Get No Satisfaction!"	Maaya Sakamoto	Katsutoshi Kitagawa	Shin Kono
7.	"Ao no Ether" (蒼のエーテル Ao no Ēteru)	Maaya Sakamoto	Yoko Kanno	Yoko Kanno
8.	"Shitsuren Cafe" (失恋カフェ Shitsuren Kafe)	Maaya Sakamoto	Tabo	Taichi Tachimura
9.	"Sonic Boom"	Maaya Sakamoto	Yūichi Ichikawa	Yūichi Ichikawa
10.	"Peanuts" (ピーナッツ Pīnattsu)	Maaya Sakamoto	Bargains	Bargains
11.	"Saigo no Kajitsu" (さいごの果実)	Maaya Sakamoto	Shōko Suzuki	Neko Saito
12.	"Colors"	Tim Jensen	ACO	Shin Kōno
13.	"Kazamidori" (カザミドリ)	Maaya Sakamoto	Haruna Yokota	Sentarō Watanabe
14.	"Guitar Hiki ni Naritai na" (ギター弾きになりたいな)	Maaya Sakamoto	Tomoki Kanda	Tomoki Kanda

=== Everlasting Songs ===
Everlasting Songs is a first studio album under the FictionJunction name and was first released on February 25, 2009, by Victor Entertainment with the catalog number VTCL-60106. It contains 15 tracks whose lyrics, composition, and arrangement are provided by Yuki Kajiura with performance provided by the singers of Kajiura's FictionJunction solo project: Asuka Kato (FictionJunction Asuka), Kaori Oda (FictionJunction KAORI), Keiko Kubota (FictionJunction Keiko), Wakana Ootaki (FictionJunction Wakana), Yuuka Nanri (FictionJunction Yuuka), and Yuriko Kaida. It is the first album of where all of the singers of FictionJunction have participated in a single album. The track "Kioku no Mori" (記憶の森) performed by FictionJunction is the ending theme to the OVA series Tsubasa Shunraiki. It peak ranked 27th on the Oricon albums chart and remained on the chart for one week.

Track listing

#	Title	Vocalist	Original vocalist Original album	Length
1	"Hoshikuzu" "Stardust" (星屑)	Kaori Oda, Keiko Kubota	Noriko Ogawa; Fantasy Sound & Reading: The Velveteen Rabbit (disc 1 ~ fantasy reading tracks)	
2	"Kioku no Mori" "Forest of Memories" (記憶の森)	Yuuka Nanri		
3	"Dream Scape"	Kaori Oda	Kaori Oda; Future Soundscape III	
4	"Gin no Hashi" "Silver Bridge" (銀の橋)	Kaori Oda, Keiko Kubota, Wakana Ootaki	Minami Omi; Aquarian Age ~ Sign For Evolution Sphere.4 Influential E.G.O	
5	"Kaze no Machi e" "To the City of Wind" (風の街へ)	Keiko Kubota	Keiko Kubota; Future Soundscape II	
6	"Here We Stand in the Morning Dew"	Yuriko Kaida	Saeko Chiba; Sayonara Solitia	
7	"Synchronicity"	Keiko Kubota	Yui Makino; Synchronicity	
8	"Hanamori no Oka"" "Hill of the Flower Guard" (花守の丘)	Kaori Oda	Kaori Oda	
9	"Mizu no Akashi" "Water's Testimony" (水の証)	Wakana Ootaki	Rie Tanaka; Chara de Rie	
10	"Cazador Del Amor"	Yuuka Nanri		
11	"Himitsu" "Secret" (秘密)	Yuriko Kaida	Aya Hisakawa blanc dans NOIR: Kuro no Naka no Shiro	
12	"Hōseki" "Jewel" (宝石)	Keiko Kubota	Marina Inoue; Hōseki	
13	"Yume no Tsubasa" "Wing of Dreams" (ユメノツバサ)	Kaori Oda	Yui Makino; Future Soundscape II	
14	"Michiyuki" "Traveling the Road" (みちゆき)	Kaori Oda	Kaori Hikita; Tsuki no Curse	
15	"Everlasting Song" (Japanese version)	Asuka Kato		

== Compilation albums ==
=== Best Vocal Collection ===
Best Vocal Collection (ベスト·ボーカル·コレクション, Besuto Bōkaru Korekushon) is a compilation album that collects the "best" theme music, insert songs, character songs, and background music from the anime television series Tsubasa Chronicle and its adaptation into drama CDs. It was first released on December 20, 2006, by Victor Entertainment with the catalog number VICL-62166. It spans 14 tracks and covers a duration of 1:01:45. The only original work in the soundtrack is "Tsuki no Shijima", a Japanese vocal song performed by Yui Makino with lyrics, composition, and arrangement all provided by Yuki Kajiura that was featured in the anime series Tsubasa Chronicle as an insert song. The album peak ranked 103rd on the Oricon albums chart and remained on the chart for three weeks.

Track listing
No.	Title	Original Album	Length
1.	"Blaze"	"Blaze"	4:27
2.	"Tsubasa" (lit. Wings)	Future Soundscape I	4:35
3.	"Loop" (ループ)	"Loop"	5:24
4.	"Tsuki no Shijima" (つきのしじま)		5:04
5.	"Kaze no Machi e" (風の街へ)	Future Soundscape II	5:01
6.	"Zankō" (斬光)	"The Matinée of the Palace" Chapter.1 ~Coral, the City on the Water~	3:47
7.	"Kizuna" (キズナ)	"The Matinée of the Palace" Chapter.2 ~Impossible Goal~	4:51
8.	"It's"	"It's"	4:51
9.	"Dream Scape"	Future Soundscape III	4:51
10.	"Ring Your Song"	Future Soundscape IV	2:26
11.	"Smile"	"The Matinée of the Palace" Chapter.2 ~Impossible Goal~	4:46
12.	"You Are My Love"	Future Soundscape I	2:34
13.	"Tabi no Tochū de Kibō no Uta o Utaō" (旅の途中で希望の歌を歌おう)	"The Matinée of the Palace" Chapter.3 ~Unspeakable Lines~	4:56
14.	"Kazemachi Jet" (風待ちジェット)	Kazemachi Jet / Spica	3:49

== Drama CDs ==
Three drama CDs adaptations of the anime series Tsubasa Chronicle have been released by Victor Entertainment between 2005 and 2006. Some time after leaving Koryo Country, the group of five protagonists arrive in a dimension where the King Yukito, the same Yukito seen in Clow Country, is troubled by an unfeeling heart and is the only one in the country who could open the door to one of Sakura's feathers. All of the releases charted on the Oricon charts for a single week, with the highest ranking album being "The Matinée of the Palace" Chapter.2 ~Impossible Goal~ peak ranking at 161st. Additionally, a spin-off series of three drama CDs titled "Private High School Holitsuba" have been released between 2006 and 2009.

=== "The Matinée of the Palace" Chapter. 1 ~Coral, the City on the Water~ ===
"The Matinée of the Palace" Chapter.1 ~Coral, the City on the Water~ (「王宮のマチネ」Chapter.1 ~ありえないゴール~, Ōkyū no Machine Chapter. 1 ~Suijō Toshi Koraru~) is a drama CD adaptation of the anime television series Tsubasa Chronicle first released on December 16, 2005, by Victor Entertainment under the catalog number VICL-61794. It contains 7 tracks and covers a duration of 26:12. It features two pieces of theme music in both original and instrumental versions and three tracks of dialogue between Syaoran, Sakura, Kurogane, Fay D. Flourite, Mokona, Tōya, and Yukito with background music taken from the anime. "Zankō" (斬光) is the opening theme performed by Tetsu Inada. "Towa no Omoi" (永遠の想い) is the ending theme performed by Yui Makino. Additionally, the CD features an original two-page card-shaped calendar. It peak ranked 165th on the Oricon albums chart and remained on the chart for one week.

Some time after leaving Koryo Country, Syaoran, Sakura, Kurogane, Fay, and Mokona arrive in a new dimension where a single island is surrounded by a vast sea. Sensing a strong magical presence they believe to be one of Sakura's feathers, they enter the city where they meet King Yukito and his servant Tōya, the same characters as those found in Clow Country. Although King Yukito is the only one in the country able to open the door to the room that may hold Sakura's feather, he is no longer able to feel any emotion. In order to get hold of the feather, Fay suggests they help Tōya revive Yukito's heart by performing a play.

Track listing
No.	Title	Lyrics	Music	Arrangement	Length
1.	"Zankō" (斬光, Light of the Sword; performed by Tetsu Inada as Kurogane)	Naoki Nishi	Ryosuke Nakanishi	Ryosuke Nakanishi	3:50
2.	"Joshō" (序章, Prologue)				3:39
3.	"Yukito-ō to Tōya" (雪兎王と桃矢, King Yukito and Tōya)				4:17
4.	"Fai no Takurami" (ファイの企み, Fay's Plan)				2:24
5.	"Towa no Omoi" (永遠の想い, Eternal Feelings; Performed by Yui Makino as Sakura)	Yui Makino	Yoshiko Goshima	Eiji Yoshizawa	4:07
6.	"Zankō (Off Vocal)" (斬光 (off vocal), Light of the Sword (off vocal))		Ryosuke Nakanishi	Ryosuke Nakanishi	3:51
7.	"Towa no Omoi (Off Vocal)" (永遠の想い (Off Vocal), Eternal Feelings (off vocal))		Yoshiko Goshima	Eiji Yoshizawa	4:03

=== "The Matinée of the Palace" Chapter. 2 ~Impossible Goal~ ===
"The Matinée of the Palace" Chapter. 2 ~Impossible Goal~ (「王宮のマチネ」Chapter.2 ~ありえないゴール~, "Ōkyū no Machine" Chapter.2 ~Arienai Gōru~) is a drama CD adaptation of the anime television series Tsubasa Chronicle first released on February 1, 2006, by Victor Entertainment under the catalog number VICL-61851. It contains 7 tracks and covers a duration of 31:04. It features two pieces of theme music in both original and instrumental versions and three tracks of dialogue between Syaoran, Sakura, Kurogane, Fay D. Flourite, Mokona, Tōya, and Yukito with background music taken from the anime. "Kizuna" (キズナ) is the opening theme performed by Miyu Irino. "Smile" is the ending theme performed by Daisuke Namikawa. Additionally, the CD features an original two-page card-shaped calendar. It peak ranked 161st on the Oricon albums chart and remained on the chart for one week.

Fay writes a play that is essentially a reenactment of the group's journey. In that play, Syaoran and Sakura must confess their love for each other. However, Sakura is unable to say words during practice and also when they perform the play in front of Yukito and Tōya.

Track listing
No.	Title	Lyrics	Music	Arrangement	Length
1.	"Kizuna" (キズナ, Bond; performed by Miyu Irino as Syaoran)	Mai Takahashi	森谷敏紀	Ryosuke Nakanishi	4:51
2.	"Ōkyū Gekijō" (王宮劇場, Palace Theater)				5:13
3.	"Wakaki Yūsha to Kako Naki Himegimi" (若き勇者と過去なき姫君, The Young Hero and the Past-less Princess)				3:43
4.	"Kokuhaku" (告白, Confession)				2:47
5.	"Smile" (Performed by Daisuke Namikawa as Fay D. Flourite)	Naoki Nishi	Kazuo Yoda	Kazuo Yoda	4:48
6.	"Kizuna (instrumental)" (キズナ -Instrumental-, Bond (Instrumental))		森谷敏紀	Ryosuke Nakanishi	4:53
7.	"Smile" (Smile -オリジナルカラオケ- Smile (orijinaru karaoke), Smile (original karaoke))		Kazuo Yoda	Kazuo Yoda	4:44

=== "The Matinée of the Palace" Chapter. 3 ~Unspeakable Lines~ ===
"The Matinée of the Palace" Chapter.3 ~Unspeakable Lines~ (「王宮のマチネ」Chapter.3 ~言えないセリフ~, "Ōkyū no Machine" Chapter.3 ~Ienai Serifu~) is a drama CD adaptation of the anime television series Tsubasa Chronicle first released on March 24, 2006, by Victor Entertainment under the catalog number VICL-61897. It contains 7 tracks and covers a duration of 31:14. It features two pieces of theme music in both original and instrumental versions and three tracks of dialogue between Syaoran, Sakura, Kurogane, Fay D. Flourite, Mokona, Tōya, and Yukito with background music taken from the anime. "Tabi no Tochū de Kibō no Uta o Utaō" (旅の途中で希望の歌を歌おう) is the opening theme and is performed by Mika Kikuchi. "Yume no Tsubasa" (ユメノツバサ) is the ending theme and is performed by Miyu Irino and Yui Makino. Additionally, the CD features an original two-page card-shaped calendar. It peak ranked 226th on the Oricon albums chart and remained on the chart for one week.

During the play, as Sakura is unable to say that she likes Syaoran, the two decide to instead improvise and speak from the heart. However, this causes Sakura to remember her past although she soon forgets her recollection due to Yūko's magic. Upon hearing their situation, Yukito once more feels sadness and decides to reveal that he sealed his heart, the presence Mokona felt earlier, so as not experience the pain of having a distant relationship with Tōya, his childhood friend. The group then leave for another world.

Track listing
No.	Title	Writer(s)	Performance	Length
1.	"Tabi no Tochū de Kibō no Uta o Utaō" (旅の途中で希望の歌を歌おう, Let's Sing a Song of Hope Along the Journey)	Yukari Hashimoto	Mika Kikuchi as Mokona	4:55
2.	"Kakusei" (覚醒, Awakening)			6:03
3.	"Ō no Kokoro" (王の心, The King's Heart)			4:07
4.	"Shūshō" (終章, Epilogue)			1:56
5.	"Yume no Tsubasa" (ユメノツバサ, Wings of Dreams)	Yuki Kajiura	Miyu Irino as Syaoran & Yui Makino as Sakura	4:38
6.	"Tabi no Tochū de Kibō no Uta o Utaō (Karaoke)" (旅の途中で希望の歌を歌おう (カラオケ), Let's Sing a Song of Hope Along the Journey (karaoke))	Yukari Hashimoto		4:58
7.	"Yume no Tsubasa (duet version) (karaoke)" (ユメノツバサ (カラオケ), Wings of Dreams (karaoke))	Yuki Kajiura		4:34

=== Private High School Holitsuba series ===
A series of three spin-off drama CDs have been released, with a fourth to be released, featuring characters from Tsubasa: Reservoir Chronicle and characters from its sister manga series xxxHolic in an alternative universe attending the same school, Holitsuba, as either teachers or students. Holitsuba (ホリツバ, Horitsuba) is a portmanteau of "Holic" (ホリック) and "Tsubasa" (ツバサ). The first three CDs were released to the applicant readers of the Weekly Shōnen Magazine in which Tsubasa: Reservoir Chronicle is serialized and of the Young Magazine in which xxxHolic is serialized. The first, titled "'Private High School Holitsuba' Episode 1: A Heartpounding Valetine's Day!" (「私立堀鐔学園」第1話･バレンタインデーにドッキドキ!, 'Shiritsu Horitsuba Gakuen' Dai 1 Wa Barentain Dē ni Dokki Doki!), was released during July 2006. "'Private High School Holitsuba' Episode 2: Heartpounding Preparation for the Holitsuba festival!" (「私立堀鐔学園」第2話･堀鐔祭準備中にドッキドキ!, 'Shiritsu Horitsuba Gakuen' Dai 2 Wa Horitsubamatsuri Junbichū ni Dokki Doki!) followed during October 2006. The third CD, titled "'Private High School Holitsuba' Episode 3: A Heartpounding Treasure Hunting Game" (「私立堀鐔学園」第3話･宝探しゲームにドッキドキ!, 'Shiritsu Horitsuba Gakuen' Dai 3 Wa Takarasagashi Gēmu ni Dokki Doki!), followed on August 22, 2007, in Shōnen Magazine and on August 27 in Young Magazine. A fourth CD, "'Private High School Holitsuba' Episode 4: Wait Until After School!" (「私立堀鐔学園」第4話･堀鐔学園お昼のラジオ・放課後まで待てない!), was released to customers who bought all four DVDs of the xxxHolic and Tsubasa: Reservoir Chronicle 2009 OVA adaptations, xxxHolic Shunmuki and Tsubasa Shunraiki respectively. The series has also been adapted to short manga one-shots by Clamp.

== Release history ==
=== Albums ===
Title	Oricon Chart		Ref.
Title	Peak	Weeks	Ref.
Future Soundscape I: Released: July 6, 2005; Label: Victor Entertainment (VICL-61661; regular) (VIZL-137; limited)	39	3	
Future Soundscape II: Released: September 22, 2005; Label: Victor Entertainment (VICL-61662; regular) (VIZL-145; limited)	92	2	
"The Matinée of the Palace" Chapter.1 ~Coral, the City on the Water~: Released: December 16, 2005; Label: Victor Entertainment (VICL-61794)	165	1	
"The Matinée of the Palace" Chapter.2 ~Impossible Goal~: Released: February 1, 2006; Label: Victor Entertainment (VICL-61851)	161	1	
"The Matinée of the Palace" Chapter.3 ~Unspeakable Lines~: Released: March 24, 2006; Label: Victor Entertainment (VICL-61897)	226	1	
Future Soundscape III: Released: July 5, 2006; Label: Victor Entertainment (VICL-61966; regular) (VIZL-189; limited)	83	2	
Future Soundscape IV: Released: September 21, 2006; Label: Victor Entertainment (VICL-62084; regular) (VIZL-203; limited)	80	1	
Best Vocal Collection: Released: December 20, 2006; Label: Victor Entertainment (VICL-62166)	103	3	
Kazeyomi: Released: January 14, 2009; Label: Victor Entertainment (VTCL-35008; regular) (VTZL-8; limited)	3	7	
Everlasting Songs: Released: February 25, 2009; Label: Victor Entertainment (VTCL-60106)	27	1	

=== Singles ===
Title	Oricon Chart		Ref.
Title	Peak	Weeks	Ref.
"Loop": Released: May 10, 2005; Label: Victor Entertainment (VICL-35791)	7	9	
"Blaze": Released: June 22, 2005; Label: R and C (YRCN-10092)	19	5	
"Aerial": Released: August 17, 2005; Label: R and C (YRCN-10108)	45	3	
"Amrita": Released: August 18, 2005; Label: Victor Entertainment (VICL-35846)	53	5	
"It's": Released: May 24, 2006; Label: R and C (YRCN-10138)	63	3	
Kazemachi Jet / Spica: Released: July 14, 2006; Label: Victor Entertainment (VICL-36059)	14	6	
"Synchronicity": Released: November 21, 2007; Label: Victor Entertainment (VTCL-35007)	49	3	
Saigo no Kajitsu / Mitsubachi to Kagakusha: Released: November 21, 2007; Label: Victor Entertainment (VTCL-35008)	19	7	

== Reception ==
The musical score for the anime adaptation have generally received praise by critics. N.S. Davidson of IGN described the soundtrack as some of "some of the most glorious and touching music to be found in anime". Mania Entertainment's Chris Beveridge described the background music as "beautiful" and Bryan Morton of Mania Entertainment described the score as "another excellent soundtrack by Yuki Kajiura". Anime News Network's Carl Kimlinger agreed with Beveridge and Morton, however described the musical score as "apocalyptic" and "gloomy", ill-suited to the mood of the anime that helped transform the "what should have been a breezy lark ... into something muddy, ponderous, and far too serious-minded". However, both Beveridge and IGN's Chris Wyatt noted that the bass levels were overwhelming at times.

The anime's first season's theme music have received good reviews whereas the second season's theme music have not. Anime Fringe's Lesley Smith described the first season's theme opening as providing a "breathtaking" introduction to the anime, taking the listener through a journey to unknown worlds similar to what the protagonists of Tsubasa: Reservoir Chronicle do. She described the first season's ending theme as "gorgeous" with "amazing" vocals and "lyrics [that] fit the song perfectly".
