= Tsubasa: Reservoir Chronicle season 1 =

Tsubasa: Reservoir Chronicle
- Season 1
- First Western DVD volume
- No. of episodes: 26

Release
- Original network: NHK E
- Original release: April 9 – October 15, 2005

Season chronology
- Next → Season 2

Tsubasa: Reservoir Chronicle, known in Japan as Tsubasa Chronicle (ツバサ･クロニクル, Tsubasa Kuronikuru), is a Japanese anime television series based on the manga series of the same name created by Clamp. The plot follows how Sakura, the princess of the Kingdom of Clow, loses all her memories and how Syaoran, a young archaeologist who is her childhood friend, goes on arduous adventures to save her, with two other companions. The Dimensional Witch Yūko Ichihara instructs him to go with two people, Kurogane and Fai D. Flowright. They search for Sakura's memories, which were scattered in various worlds in the form of angelic-like feathers, as retrieving them will help save her very being.

It wase written by Hiroyuki Kawasaki and directed by Kōichi Mashimo, with Hiroshi Morioka joining on as co-director for the second season. The music for the series was composed by Yuki Kajiura. The first season was broadcast in Japan on NHK E from April 9 to October 15, 2005. The first season features two pieces of theme music. "Blaze" performed by Kinya Kotani is the opening theme. "Loop" (ループ, Rūpu) performed by Maaya Sakamoto is the ending theme.

The season was released in seven DVD volumes between August 26, 2005, and February 24, 2006, by Bandai Visual. Funimation released the series in North America and United Kingdom in six volumes. Meanwhile, Madman Entertainment released it in Australia.

A boxset was released on November 11, 2008, in North America, on March 16, 2009, in the United Kingdom, and November 12, 2008, in Australia. The entire series was released in North America on January 19, 2010.

== Episode list ==
No.	Title	Location	Original release date
1	"Destinies Converge"; Transliteration: "Hitsuzen no Deai" (Japanese: 必然のデアイ)	Clow Kingdom	April 9, 2005
When Syaoran returns to his home for a change of clothes after studying the ruins, he meets his dearest and closest childhood friend Sakura, the princess of Clow Kingdom (玖楼国, Kurō Koku). She convinces him to stay longer, and the two wander the town shopping together. At the end of their excursion, she attempts to confess her love for him, but is interrupted and forced to return to the castle. When Syaoran returns to the ruins, he is surprised to find Sakura there. A mysterious force begins to draw her into the wall and causes her memories to manifest themselves in the form of feathers. When he pulls her to safety, her memories scatter across the dimensions. The priest Yukito tells him to seek out the help of the Dimensional Witch and sends the two to the dimension in which she resides. Upon arriving there, two others soon follow: Kurogane who is exiled from his dimension for killing excessively and Fai D. Flourite who is running away from the king of his dimension.
2	"The Power to Fight"; Transliteration: "Tatakau Chikara" (Japanese: 戦うチカラ)	Japan	April 16, 2005
Transported to the modern day Japan (日本, Nippon), Syaoran, Kurogane, and Fai ask the Dimensional Witch, Yūko Ichihara, to grant their wishes. Syaoran wishes to travel to many worlds to restore Sakura's memories. Kurogane wishes to return to his own world. Fai wishes to travel to a world that is not his own so as to avoid meeting his king. Yūko tells them that although their intentions are different, their wishes are the same. In order to have their wish granted, each must pay a price. She asks Syaoran to pay with his relationship with Sakura which would result in Sakura losing her memories of Syaoran, Kurogane to pay with his sword Ginryū, and Fai to pay with the tattoo on his back. Though hesitant, each pays their respective price, and in return she gives the group a white creature named Mokona Modoki who holds the power to cross to random dimensions. The group sets off to another dimension where a gang war is about to commence between two groups led by Kanio and Shōgo respectively who use a power called Kudan (巧断) that can manifest itself as a familiar. A boy named Masayoshi finds them and brings them to safety. When Fai gives Syaoran one of Sakura's feather, taking it off Syaoran's shirt, the feather is blown by a stray blast. After running into the fray to retrieve the feather, Syaoran finds that he too possesses the power Kudan and interferes with the fight.
3	"Sword of Demon Destruction"; Transliteration: "Hama no Katana" (Japanese: 破魔のカタナ)	Hanshin Republic	April 23, 2005
After the group arriving Hanshin Republic (ハンシン共和国, Hanshin Kyōwakoku) and Syaoran interferes with the gang war chasing the gang led by Kanio away, the other gang retreats when they hear the police about to arrive. Sent by the Dimensional Witch as a favor to care for them, Sorata Arisugawa and Arashi Arisugawa find the group of travelers and take them to the residential apartment building that they own. After some rest and a change of clothes, the three go around town looking for Sakura's feather that Mokona sensed earlier during the battle. Kurogane spots someone who looks like Princess Tomoyo and chases after her alone. Losing sight of the girl, Kurogane meets the gang led by Kanio and they begin to fight; Kurogane emerges as the victor with the help of his own Kudan. Meanwhile, Syaoran, Fai, and Mokona enter a restaurant for lunch where they meet people who share the same appearance and personality of Sakura's brother Toya and his friend Yukito. At the end of the day, everyone returns to Sorata and Arashi's apartment.
4	"Innocent Wandering"; Transliteration: "Kegare Naki Hōrō" (Japanese: 汚れなき放浪)	Hanshin Republic	April 30, 2005
After the group leave to search for the Sakura's memory fragment once more, Sakura wakes from her sleep and leaves her room to follow a bird. When Arashi realizes that Sakura is gone, she tells Syaoran, Kurogane, Fai, and Mokona and they begin searching for her. The gang leader Kanio comes across Sakura in town and concocts a scheme to use Sakura to threaten Syaoran to join his gang. However, due to her kindness, he decides to disband his gang and return to an honest life giving his gang's territory to the gang led by Shōgo. The group of travelers find Sakura once more and bring her back to Sorata and Arashi's apartment.
5	"The Battle of the Mage"; Transliteration: "Majutsushi no Batoru" (Japanese: 魔術師のバトル)	Hanshin Republic	May 7, 2005
Sorata and Arashi suggest that the feather is contained inside someone's Kudan and that such a Kudan would have to be quite powerful to be able to hold Sakura's feather. As the group ponder upon a method to carry out a search for such a Kudan, Shōgo's girlfriend, Primera, kidnaps Mokona and Masayoshi in order to attract more of Shōgo's attention leaving a letter of challenge for Syaoran, Fai, and Kurogane. In spite of being unable to speak to each other as Mokona had been acting as a magical translator for them, they make their way to Hanshin Castle. There, Primera offers to return the hostages if they agree to fight with her. Fai meets her challenge revealing his own Kudan that enables him to fly and wins the fight. When Shōgo arrives, Mokona declares that the feather is somewhere nearby. Shōgo challenges Syaoran to a battle to test his own strength.
6	"Unshed Tears"; Transliteration: "Nakanai Namida" (Japanese: 泣かないナミダ)	Hanshin Republic	May 14, 2005
Syaoran and Shōgo begin their unfinished fight. As a result, Hanshin Castle begins to shake and it becomes dangerous for Masayoshi and Primera standing atop it. When Masayoshi's Kudan saves them, Mokona senses that it holds within itself Sakura's feather. It becomes enraged such that Masayoshi can no longer control it due to the influence of Sakura's feather consumed by the desire to protect its master and begins destroying the city. Syaoran chases after it and removes the feather, returning control of the Kudan to Masayoshi. After saying their farewells, the group head towards a new world.
7	"The Broken Memento"; Transliteration: "Kudaketa Katami" (Japanese: 砕けたカタミ)	Koryo Country	May 21, 2005
Arriving in the next world, Koryo Country (ナユタヤ国, Nayutaya Kuni), Syaoran and the gang get harassed by the Ryanban's son and his minions. Shortly after that, they meet a young girl by the name of Chu'nyan who chases the thugs off. When the son runs home to his father, Syaoran realizes that his source of power is one of Sakura's feathers enclosed in a ball. Due to the weird clothing that Syaoran and company are wearing, Chu'nyan mistakes them for Amen'osa, or secret investigators from the government sent to the many kingdoms to right wrongs, and take them to her house. After a long talk with them, she realizes that they could not possibly be Amen'osa, and she tells them about the evil Ryanban of the area and how he murdered her mother. Later on, the Ryanban's son and his thugs burn down a villager's house because he did not pay taxes. After a fight between them and Syaoran, Chu'nyan's only keepsake from her mother, her magical fan, ends up getting destroyed by the Ryanban's son.
8	"God's Beloved Daughter"; Transliteration: "Kami no Manamusume" (Japanese: 神の愛娘)	Koryo Country	May 28, 2005
Fai and Kurogane decide to storm the castle even when Chu'nyan tells them that powerful secret arts protect it. Chu'nyan, Syaoran, and Sakura visit the resistance in town against the Ryanban. Sakura is drawn towards the castle and mysteriously disappears inside. Syaoran goes in after her and there they meet all the townspeople that have been imprisoned and have changed into monsters. Sakura and Syaoran are then back in front of the gates of the castle because of a mysterious presence. They tell the villagers what happened to the others sucked in from the gate. Kurogane and Fai decide not to storm the castle but to think of another method. The villagers decide to fight once more.
9	"Princess of Shadows"; Transliteration: "Ayashiki Onna" (Japanese: 妖しきオンナ)	Koryo Country	June 4, 2005
It is revealed that the Ryanban has a secret weapon which is in the form of a mysterious witch, named Kiishimu. Syaoran is still determined in getting into the castle that has Sakura's feather inside. Though he was hurt from the previous battle, he still plans to go inside.
10	"Mirror of Separation"; Transliteration: "Wakare no Kagami" (Japanese: 別離のカガミ)	Koryo Country	June 11, 2005
The villagers of Koryo storm the castle as Chu'nyan follows Sakura; meanwhile, Syaoran continues to battle the Ryanban's son and Fai and Kurogane continue to fight Kiishimu. Kurogane unintentionally frees Kiishimu from her imprisonment set by the Ryanban, by breaking the stone on her forehead. It is later on revealed that it was used to control her by the foolish lord. She then kisses Kurograne to say thank you. Chu'nyan learns that her mother's spirit temporarily inhabits Sakura's body and Chu'nyan comes to understand the true meaning of hijutsu. Her mother gives her own hijutsu mirror to Chu'nyan and departs from Sakura's body.
11	"The Chosen Tomorrow"; Transliteration: "Erabareta Ashita" (Japanese: 選ばれたアシタ)	Koryo Country	June 18, 2005
The villagers tried to attack the Ryanban's castle and are now under his control. To make matters worse, Syaoran sees that Chu'nyan and Sakura are trapped in a bubble and learns that if he attacks the villagers, the girls will feel the effects tenfold. But his determination gives him an edge in the fight as he finds out that the girls trapped inside the bubble are not the real Sakura and Chu'nyan.
12	"The Warm Smile"; Transliteration: "Atatakana Egao" (Japanese: 暖かなエガオ)	Fog Country	June 25, 2005
In the next world, the group found no people and no buildings. All that's there is a huge lake in which Mokona senses a powerful force. Syaoran dives in to take a look. When he resurfaces Sakura catches him up in her strange memory. Syaoran goes back under water, and while he is gone Sakura has a strange encounter with a creature from the lake. The creature asks questions to her, and as she struggles with this answer, she passes out. In her unconscious state she recovers a memory from when she first met Syaoran. Syaoran has a flashback of his own back to when he attended Sakura's birthday party. Since Syaoran has no memories from the time before Fujitaka became his father, Sakura made it so that his and her birthdays would be on the same day. Sakura regains her consciousness and Syaoran takes her to the bottom of the sea to see a spectacular miniature city. This occurrence reminds Syaoran of the time when Sakura showed him the white birds from the top of the castle. Mokona informs everyone that there's no feather in this world and they leave for the next one.
13	"Advocate of Illusions"; Transliteration: "Maboroshi no Otogi" (Japanese: まぼろしのオトギ)	Jade Country	July 2, 2005
The group end up in a new world, Jade Country (ジェイド国, Jeido Kuni), where there is an old legend story about a golden haired princess who possessed a feather with magical powers and they are convinced that it belongs to Sakura so they go to a forbidden castle with a deep river surrounding it to try find some children that were abducted. While they are in town, they are taking refuge in the house of a kind doctor, Kyle. But while everyone is asleep, Sakura sees the golden haired princess and follows her but then she is suddenly put to sleep. Now Sakura is getting the blame for taking the children and Syaoran is worried that she will never come back alive.
14	"Truth In History"; Transliteration: "Shinjitsu no Rekishi" (Japanese: 真実のレキシ)	Jade Country	July 9, 2005
Sakura wakes up after fainting and thinks she sees the Princess. Syaoran and the gang go check with Mr. Grosum if he has one of Sakura's feathers. They search his home to find clues of Sakura's whereabouts until they're interrupted by Mr. Grosum. Sakura tries to find a way to escape from the room she is in. Meanwhile Syaoran discusses a plan with Doctor Kyle about stalking Mr. Grosum's house. As Sakura escapes, the ghost of the Princess appears to Sakura and tells her a story of a mystical feather came into her possession and how it wards off evil. Syaoran then uncovers the truth and finds out that Dr. Kyle knows where Sakura and the children are.
15	"A Heart that Believes"; Transliteration: "Shinjiru Kokoro" (Japanese: 信じるココロ)	Jade Country	July 16, 2005
Sakura tries to escape from the forbidden castle with ghost Princess Emeraude's help. She also brings the children along with her. Meanwhile, Syaoran and all the townspeople want to hear Dr. Kyle's confession. He then confesses that the kidnapping was his doing and he used the children in order to break the feather free. The children escape from the castle but Sakura is still trapped. Dr. Kyle escapes from the townspeople and decides to grab Sakura instead, but suddenly Syaoran comes to rescue her. The castle begins to tremble as the reservoir from the river overflows. While they confront Dr. Kyle, the wall of the castle suddenly breaks and smashes into the doctor. They are freed as they see the castle collapse, and the townspeople thank the group for rescuing their children. At the end of their journey, they realize that they are being watched by someone who is also interested in Sakura's feather.
16	"Strength and Kindness"; Transliteration: "Tsuyosa to Yasashisa" (Japanese: 強さと優しさ)	Storm Country	July 23, 2005
The story starts off with a girl being hit with a mysterious beam on her head. Inside the shrine, Keefer goes in a saves her from the Guardian of the shrine. The group enters the world, Storm Country (シュトルム国, Shutorumu Kuni), in the middle of a tournament in order to see who is the strongest. Syaoran eventually wins the match. But Keefer needs that sacred object that Syaoran won from the tournament. They both fight to see who gets it, ending with Syaoran giving the sacred object to save the girl. This episode is a filler and is not part of the manga's storyline.
17	"Demon Hunters"; Transliteration: "Sakura no Kuni no Kafe" (Japanese: 桜の国のカフェ)	Ōto Country	July 30, 2005
The travelers arrive in the land of Ōto Country (桜都国), lit. country of cherry blossoms, and are greeted by a welcoming party and are advised to register themselves at town hall. They are housed in a former shop, but that night they are attacked by an Oni, which Syaoran defeats albeit getting injured. Syaoran and Kurogane become Oni Hunters whereas Fai becomes the owner of a Café and Sakura becomes the waitress, with assistance from Mokona.
18	"Cat and Dog"; Transliteration: "Nyanko to Wanko" (Japanese: にゃんことワンコ)	Ōto Country	August 20, 2005
After talking to Yūko, Mokona names the Café, calling it The Cat's Eye, a name suggested by Yūko. The group's Ōto aliases are revealed and Kurogane attacks Fai for giving them strange names. Kurogane and Fai find out Syaoran is blind in his right eye. Kurogane and Fai leave for a bar to find out some information about the strange Oni that keeps attacking them, but get attacked on the way back. The insert song "Kaze no Machi he" (風の街へ) was also sung during the fight scene.
19	"Living Resolve"; Transliteration: "Ikiru Kakugo" (Japanese: 生きるカクゴ)	Ōto Country	August 27, 2005
Kurogane and Fai finish off the Oni but Kurogane ends up losing his sword in the fight and Fai hurts his leg. Sakura and Syaoran meet Ryū-ō and Sōma. After finishing a meal at the Cat's Eye, a strange person who seems to know Syaoran appears along with Oni. Syaoran finds out he cannot defeat an Oni above a certain level without a weapon. Kurogane finally realizes that the same people are in different worlds but the way they live and what they do is different. Syaoran asks Kurogane to teach him swordsmanship.
20	"The Afternoon Piano"; Transliteration: "Gogo no Piano" (Japanese: 午後のピアノ)	Ōto Country	September 3, 2005
Syaoran and Kurogane go to a sword shop. Kurogane buys a longsword named Sōhi (Blue Ice) and Syaoran gets a sword called Hien (Scarlet Flame). After they buy the swords, Kurogane tells Syaoran not to unsheathe the sword yet because he is not ready to use it yet. Fai buys a piano for The Cat's Eye but he does not know how to play it. Kurogane begins training Syaoran on how to counteract him being blind in his right eye by learning how to balance between his left and right side. A strange woman comes into The Cat's Eye and starts asking Sakura where she is from and why she is here. Sakura goes into a trance and the woman starts playing the piano and Sakura starts singing "You are my love" in Japanese "Lost Memories" in English Dub. At the end of the episode Sakura is seen inside an egg shaped pod.
21	"The Imp's True Face"; Transliteration: "Oni no Sugao" (Japanese: 鬼児のスガオ)	Ōto Country	September 10, 2005
Kurogane tells Syaoran to blindfold himself and walk back to The Cat's Eye and that he cannot take the blindfold off until he can recognize presences. While training, Syaoran notices that Oni have the presence of something which is not alive. Kurogane and Fai leave Sakura at The Cat's Eye and go to talk to the lady that saw the new type of Oni. They find out that the Oni is created for the purpose of hunting. The new Oni seems to have Sakura's feather, and reveals himself to be Seishirō.
22	"The Indelible Memory"; Transliteration: "Kesenai Kioku" (Japanese: 消せないキオク)	Ōto Country	September 17, 2005
Syaoran starts remembering about Seishirō and that he was the one who taught Syaoran how to fight. Syaoran and Kurogane go to a tower full of Oni to get information on Seishirō. At the top of the tower they find out that Seishirō is not an Oni and that town hall is planning to eliminate him for interfering. They also find out that the highest level Oni is in the form of a human and can command all other Oni. Seishirō shows up at The Cat's Eye when only Fai and Sakura are there and asks Fai if Kurogane and Syaoran live there.
23	"The Vanishing Life"; Transliteration: "Kie yuku Inochi" (Japanese: 消えゆくイノチ)	Ōto Country	September 24, 2005
Seishirō attacks Fai after he asks if Kurogane and Syaoran live there. It is revealed that Seishirō gave his right eye to Yūko to obtain the power to travel between dimensions but unlike Mokona he can only use this power a limited number of times. Fai gets cornered and is defeated. Seishirō uses Sakura's feather and the people in the world start disintegrating like a computer program. When Syaoran and Kurogane get back to The Cat's Eye they find out that Fai was defeated by an Oni and that Sakura may have been taken captive. When Syaoran finds Seishirō and asks him what happened to Fai, he tells him that he killed Fai. Seishirō stabs Syaoran in the chest with a weapon made from Oni. Syaoran starts disappearing but then Sakura comes running out and hugs him and they both disappear.
24	"The Blade of a Desperate Fight"; Transliteration: "Shitō no Yaiba" (Japanese: 死闘のヤイバ)	Edonis Country	October 1, 2005
Syaoran wakes up inside an egg shaped pod. He hears a tapping on the glass and sees Fai there, smiling, and pointing to another pod which contains Sakura. Sakura then awakens too, and she and Syaoran get out of their pods and greet each other. Syaoran wonders where they are; the place they are in looks very different from the town. The group meet up with a woman whom Fai tells them can explain everything, and she does so. The world of Ōto is a virtual reality program in Fairy Park which is a popular game for the residents of the Edonis Country (エドニス国, Edonisu Kuni). Syaoran sees that Kurogane and Mokona are still asleep in their pods. The woman tells Syaoran that someone is interfering with the program. This person is trying to turn the virtual reality into actual reality. Kurogane, Mokona, Ryū-ō and the others appear. Seishirō then also appears and Kurogane fights with him. Before long, the true identity of the strongest Oni is revealed.
25	"The Ultimate Game"; Transliteration: "Kyūkyoku no Gēmu" (Japanese: 究極のゲーム)	Edonis Country	October 8, 2005
The fight between the group and the Oni continues, while Seishirō is told the real truth behind everlasting life in the game. Syaoran climbs to the top of the rollercoaster and tells Seishirō that he does not think he will be able to beat him in his current state. However, he has decided to get the feather back; so he draws his sword even though he knows he is not quite ready yet. When he draws the sword, it bursts into flames and the fight begins. Seishirō takes off soon after the fight begins, but as he leaves, the Oni are left behind for them to take care of. After finishing them off, Mokona reacts to the power of the item Seishirō used and takes the group to the next world.
26	"The Last Wish"; Transliteration: "Saigo no Negai" (Japanese: 最後の願い)	Tsarastora Country	October 15, 2005
Syaoran and the group arrive in the next world, Tsarastora Country (ツァラストラ国, Tsarasutora Kuni), where they read a letter from the dimensional witch. It says that Kurogane owes Yūko double for the present on Valentine's Day. After Mokona senses a feather, Syaoran passes out and has a flashback. When he wakes he finds himself surrounded by Sakura, Fai, Kurogane and Mokona, who tell him what happened. They then follow the old lady who allowed them to stay in her house, and she shows them the temple of the god they worship. She tells them it once used to be on the ground, but half a year ago it unearthed itself. The god said the first person to reach the top will be granted any wish. Syaoran, Fai, Kurogane, Mokona and Sakura fight their way to the top, and Sakura wishes that all of the people who had died trying to get to the temple would be returned to life.

== Home media release ==
Japanese

Title	Release date	Episodes
Tsubasa Chronicle I (ツバサ·クロニクル I, Tsubasa Kuronikuru I)	August 26, 2005	1-2
Tsubasa Chronicle II (ツバサ·クロニクル II, Tsubasa Kuronikuru II)	September 23, 2005	3-6
Tsubasa Chronicle III (ツバサ·クロニクル III, Tsubasa Kuronikuru III)	October 28, 2005	7-10
Tsubasa Chronicle IV (ツバサ·クロニクル IV, Tsubasa Kuronikuru IV)	November 25, 2005	11-14
Tsubasa Chronicle V (ツバサ·クロニクル V, Tsubasa Kuronikuru V)	December 23, 2005	15-18
Tsubasa Chronicle VI (ツバサ·クロニクル VI, Tsubasa Kuronikuru VI)	January 27, 2006	19-22
Tsubasa Chronicle VII (ツバサ·クロニクル VII, Tsubasa Kuronikuru VII)	February 24, 2006	23-26

English

Title	US Release date	UK Release date	AU Release date	Episodes
Tsubasa: Reservoir Chronicle Volume 1 – Gathering of Fates (including Season 1 Starter Set)	May 22, 2007	September 17, 2007	September 12, 2007	1-5
Tsubasa: Reservoir Chronicle Volume 2 – Seeds of Revolution	July 17, 2007	November 19, 2007	November 7, 2007	6-10
Tsubasa: Reservoir Chronicle Volume 3 – Spectres of Legend	August 28, 2007	January 21, 2008	December 5, 2007	11-14
Tsubasa: Reservoir Chronicle Volume 4 – Between Death and Danger	October 9, 2007	April 21, 2008	January 23, 2008	15-18
Tsubasa: Reservoir Chronicle Volume 5 – Hunters and Prey	November 20, 2007	July 21, 2008	February 13, 2008	19-22
Tsubasa: Reservoir Chronicle Volume 6 – A Wish Upon Waking	January 8, 2008	March 16, 2009	March 19, 2008	23-26
Tsubasa: Reservoir Chronicle Season 1 Boxset	November 11, 2008	March 16, 2009	November 12, 2008	1-26
Tsubasa: Reservoir Chronicle Collected Memories Box Set	January 19, 2010	—	—	1-52; Movie
