= Eri Itō =

Japanese singer

Eri Itō (伊東恵里, Itō Eri; born November 16) is a Japanese vocalist. Born in Kanagawa Prefecture, Japan, she started singing from the age of two under her mother's lead, also studying modern ballet. She is a graduate of the Musashino Academia Musicae (武蔵野音楽大学 Musasiho Ongaku Daigaku). Her voice has been heard in 'Sona Mi Areru Ec Sancitu' of Panzer Dragoon Saga, 'Anu Orta Veniya' of Panzer Dragoon Orta, and several tracks in Tsubasa Chronicle Future Soundscape I – IV as a collaboration with Yuki Kajiura. Her most recent performances are Godsibb and Hepatica ~KOS-MOS~ for Xenosaga Episode III: Also sprach Zarathustra. In Disney movies, she voiced Belle in the Japanese dub of Beauty and the Beast, a role she reprised in Kingdom Hearts II, and provided the singing voice of the title character in Mulan. She sang in the premiere performance of the Toho musical "Miss Saigon" as the lead female character Kim.
