= Kinya Kotani =

Japanese singer

Kotani Kinya
- Origin: Saitama Prefecture, Japan
- Genre: Pop/rock
- Occupations: Singer, actor
- Website: http://kotanikinya.net/

Kinya Kotani (コタニ キンヤ, Kotani Kin'ya; born July 16, 1979), also known as KINYA, is a male singer and actor from Saitama Prefecture, Japan. He sang the theme songs for the anime Tsubasa: Reservoir Chronicle and various songs for Gravitation.

== Discography ==
=== Albums ===
List of albums, with selected chart positions
Title	Album information	Oricon
Title	Album information	Peak position
Mad Soldiers' Laboratory	Released: October 21, 1999; Catalog No.: ARCJ-114; Mini-album	
History P-20	Released: June 7, 2000; Catalog No.: ARCJ-137; Re-released: July 1, 2002 (ESCL-9036)	
What? xxPhysicalxx	Released: July 4, 2001; Catalog No.: ARCJ-171; Re-released: July 1, 2002 (ESCL-9037)	
Native	Released: November 12, 2004; Catalog No.: KKCD-00001	
Mikazuki (三日月)	Released: August 30, 2006; Catalog No.: YRCN-11084	
彩 -IRO-	Released: February 2, 2010; Catalog No.: QUEST-0009NE	
Continuation	Released: November 11, 2010; Catalog No.: QUEST-0010; Mini-album	
Electro		
Library		
GOLDEN BEST Limited Kinya Kotani. The Halfway Point		

=== Singles ===
List of singles, with selected chart positions
Title	Single information	Oricon	Album
Title	Single information	Peak position	Album
"Kōnetsu Blood" (高熱BLOOD)	Released: January 6, 2000; Catalog No.: ARDJ-5096		
"Jōnetsu Ballad" (情熱BALLAD)	Released: May 3, 2000; Catalog No.: ARCJ-139		
"Sweet Sweet Samba"	Released: July 19, 2000; Catalog No.: ARCJ-145		
"Easy Action"	Released: December 6, 2000; Catalog No.: ARCJ-158		
"No! Virtual"	Released: February 28, 2001; Catalog No.: ARCJ-166		
"Love Stuff"	Released: May 23, 2001; Catalog No.: ARDJ-5099		
"Blaze"; Opening theme song for Tsubasa Chronicle	Released: June 22, 2005; Catalog No.: YRCN-10092		
"Aerial"; Opening theme song for The Princess in the Birdcage Kingdom	Released: August 17, 2005; Catalog No.: YRCN-10108	63	
"It's"; Opening theme song for Tsubasa Chronicle Second Season	Released: May 24, 2006; Catalog No.: YRCN-10138		
"Best Position!!!"	Released: January 26, 2008; Catalog No.: RPG-00000		
Sora, Kaze (ソラ、カゼ)	Released: October 3, 2012; Catalog No.: YRCN-90203	81	
This is GRAVITATION Vol.1			
This is GRAVITATION Vol.2			
This is GRAVITATION Vol.3			
raremetal heart			
Owl of Soul			
metropolitan cowboy			

=== DVDs ===
- LIVE physical small club circuit 2001 July 1, 2002 ESBL-9038
- Live physical "ex. - 0126. 2000 to 2002 June 19, 2002 ESBL-9011
- Kinya ga yuku! Daihyakka July 1, 2002 ESBL-9039
- Kinya ga kuru!? Daihyakka July 1, 2002 ESBL-9040

=== Books ===
- "Aka" Kotani Kinya Artist Book 1 October, 2000 ISBN 4-87279-049-9
- "Ao" Kotani Kinya Artist Book 2 November, 2000 ISBN 4-87279-051-0
- "Kiiro" Kotani Kinya Artist Book 3 January, 2001 ISBN 4-87279-059-6
