= Tsubasa: Reservoir Chronicle =

2003 Japanese manga series by Clamp and its adaptations

- Cover of the first tankōbon volume, featuring Syaoran (right) and Sakura (left)

ツバサ-RESERVoir CHRoNiCLE- (Tsubasa: Rezaboa Kuronikuru)
- Genre: Adventure; Isekai; Romance
- Manga
- Written by: Clamp
- Published by: Kodansha
- English publisher: NA: Kodansha USA; SG: Chuang Yi; UK: Tanoshimi
- Imprint: Shōnen Magazine Comics
- Magazine: Weekly Shōnen Magazine
- Original run: May 21, 2003 – October 7, 2009
- Volumes: 28
- Anime television series
- Directed by: Kōichi Mashimo; Hiroshi Morioka (#27–52)
- Written by: Hiroyuki Kawasaki
- Music by: Yuki Kajiura
- Studio: Bee Train
- Licensed by: AUS: Madman Entertainment; NA: Crunchyroll; UK: Revelation Films
- Original network: NHK-E
- English network: SEA: Animax Asia; US: Funimation Channel, Crunchyroll Channel
- Original run: April 9, 2005 – November 4, 2006
- Episodes: 52
- Manga

Tsubasa World Chronicle: Nirai Kanai-hen
- Written by: Clamp
- Published by: Kodansha
- English publisher: NA: Kodansha USA
- Magazine: Magazine Special
- Original run: August 20, 2014 – March 19, 2016
- Volumes: 3
- Other
- Tsubasa Reservoir Chronicle the Movie: The Princess in the Birdcage Kingdom (film); Original video animations

Tsubasa: Reservoir Chronicle (Japanese: ツバサ-RESERVoir CHRoNiCLE-, Hepburn: Tsubasa: Rezaboa Kuronikuru) is a Japanese manga series written and illustrated by the manga artist group Clamp. It takes place in the same fictional universe as many of Clamp's other manga series, most notably xxxHolic. The plot follows how Sakura, the princess of the Kingdom of Clow, loses all her memories and how Syaoran, a young archaeologist who is her childhood friend, goes on arduous adventures to save her, with two other companions. The Dimensional Witch Yūko Ichihara instructs him to go with two people, Kurogane and Fai D. Flowright. They search for Sakura's memories, which were scattered in various worlds in the form of angelic-like feathers, as retrieving them will help save her very being. Tsubasa was conceived when four Clamp artists wanted to create a manga series that connected all their previous works. They took the designs for the main protagonists from their earlier manga called Cardcaptor Sakura.

It was serialized in Kodansha's shōnen manga magazine Weekly Shōnen Magazine from May 2003 until October 2009, and was collected in twenty-eight tankōbon volumes, totalling 232 chapters – 18 to 20 pages each. The manga was adapted into an anime series, Tsubasa Chronicle (ツバサ･クロニクル, Tsubasa Kuronikuru), animated by Bee Train, which aired 52 episodes over two seasons during 2005 and 2006. Production I.G released an interlude film between the first two seasons titled Tsubasa Reservoir Chronicle the Movie: The Princess in the Birdcage Kingdom, as well as five original video animations (OVAs) between November 2007 and May 2009, which acted as a sequel to the second season. The manga was licensed for English language release by Del Rey Manga, who has released all of its volumes since April 27, 2004. Funimation licensed the anime for English release. They published all the TV episodes on DVD volumes as well as the film. The OVAs of Tsubasa were released in North America in January 2011. Various video games and drama CDs based on the series have been released. A sequel titled Tsubasa: WoRLD CHRoNiCLE started serialization in 2014 and ended in 2016.

The series has been well received by Japanese and English readers, and it reached high positions on various best-seller lists; the series has sold over twenty million manga volumes in Japan and one million units in North America. Both the manga and anime have had positive responses from critics, who praised their connections to previous works and their artwork. The plot twists in later parts of the story have resulted in mixed reactions due to a positive focus on the impact on the plot and a negative one based on how confusing they are.

== Plot ==
The series begins by introducing childhood friends with quite a strong and close friendship: Syaoran, a young archaeologist who is investigating a ruin within the Kingdom of Clow, and Sakura, princess of the Kingdom of Clow and daughter of the late king Clow Reed. When Sakura visits Syaoran in the ruins, her spirit takes on the form of a pair of ghostly feathered wings that disintegrate into other dimensions. As she descends into a catatonic near-death state, Syaoran meets the Dimensional Witch, Yūko Ichihara, to whom he begs for help to save Sakura. Yūko is also visited by two others who each have their own wish: Kurogane, a ninja who wishes to return to his home world after being banished from his world by Princess Tomoyo to allow him to learn what true strength is; and Fai D. Flowright, a magician who wishes to never return to his home world, Celes to avoid his king, Ashura-ō. In exchange for the ability to travel across dimensions, Yūko demands that each pay with what they value most: Kurogane offers his sword Ginryū; Fai offers the tattoo that suppresses his enormous magical strength and power; and Syaoran offers all of Sakura's memories that involve him. Yūko then presents them with a creature named Mokona Modoki that sends the group on a journey across dimensions in search of Sakura's feathers. After obtaining the first feathers, Sakura awakens from her catatonic state and starts recovering her memories. During their adventures, the group gradually grows closer to the point that Fai jokingly labels them as relatives. As they travel, they learn that the feathers have their own unique abilities and can bestow several supernatural abilities to those who possess them.

During their journey in Tokyo, the group discovers that Syaoran is in reality a clone imbued with half the heart of the original Syaoran. Several years ago, Fei-Wang Reed, the wizard who caused Sakura to lose her memories, took the original Syaoran prisoner and created the clone to collect Sakura's feathers. Shortly after the original Syaoran breaks free of Fei-Wang's hold, the clone loses his heart and becomes an emotionless puppet that follows Fei-Wang's will, betraying the group. The original Syaoran joins in the group's journey with Sakura wishing to save the clone. Foreseeing a future in which Fai kills the original Syaoran forced by Fei-Wang's curse, Sakura gets stabbed in his place, but at the same time splits her body and soul, sending each to different worlds, Seresu and the Dream World, respectively. In the Dream World, the Syaoran clone destroys Sakura's soul when trying to get the feathers. Before her soul perishes, Sakura reveals that she too is a clone of the original Sakura who was also taken prisoner by Fei-Wang. Fei-Wang then takes Sakura's body to use its stored power. The group departs to rescue the two Sakuras learning from Yūko that Fei-Wang is in an alternate dimension from the Kingdom of Clow. Such a parallel dimension is the result of Syaoran's wish to save the original Sakura from Fei-Wang's curse years ago. In order to grant his wish, Syaoran became Fei-Wang's prisoner and Yūko's assistant, Kimihiro Watanuki, was used to replace Syaoran within his original world's history.

The group battles Fei-Wang who destroys the Syaoran clone when he betrays him. He then uses the immeasurably strong ability and strength of the two Sakuras to resurrect Yūko, accidentally frozen in time by Clow Reed himself to halt her death, therein proving himself Clow's superior. Yūko uses her life and Clow's magic as payment to make the clones reborn in the past to live together. As the two know all of the series' events would repeat, the clones seal themselves in Yūko's shop until the battle against him. The group manages to kill Fei-Wang, who traps Syaoran in a void between time and space, dragging both his clone and Watanuki along as a consequence of their connection. With their creator's death, both clones of Sakura and Syaoran fade away leaving behind two feathers. Syaoran and Watanuki escape from the void for a price: Syaoran must continue traveling through the dimensions forever, while Watanuki must stay in Yūko's shop. The group rests in the Kingdom of Clow, where Fai, Kurogane, and Mokona decide to join Syaoran once again in the hope of finding a way to bring back the clones who still exist as the two feathers. Before departing on their separate ways, Syaoran and Sakura confess their mutually strong, close and pure romantic love for each other, as well as their shared real name, Tsubasa, as they hope to meet again.

== Production ==
Tsubasa: Reservoir Chronicle began with an inspiration of the four-member team, Clamp, to link their works set in a realistic world with their works set in different fantasy worlds. Prior to beginning work on Tsubasa: Reservoir Chronicle, Clamp had created the manga Cardcaptor Sakura, from which the two main characters are taken. Clamp decided to draw Tsubasa: Reservoir Chronicle by using a style first conceived by Osamu Tezuka, named the "father of manga" and often credited as the "father of anime", known as Osamu Tezuka's Star System. In this system, characters with the same name and design are used in different settings, drawing mostly from the vast character pool of its own works and occasionally from others' works. Unlike characters under the Star System, three months prior to the release of Tsubasa: Reservoir Chronicle, the Young Magazine began serializing Clamp's xxxHolic, a manga whose two main characters, Kimihiro Watanuki and Yūko Ichihara, are two of the same characters used in Tsubasa: Reservoir Chronicle; both series run in parallel. Like many of their other works, each member of Clamp had a role different from their other projects instead of retaining set roles. For Tsubasa: Reservoir Chronicle, Mokona drew the main characters, whereas Tsubaki Nekoi and Satsuki Igarashi drew the side characters and backgrounds; Nanase Ohkawa was the sole person in charge of the storyline; the other members of Clamp were not told in advance how the plot would unfold. The word "Tsubasa" was used so that the title would be easy to read. However, believing "Tsubasa" only would be too short, they added the words "Chronicle" and "Reservoir" from Nekoi's notes.

A special interview with Ohkawa and Kiichiro Sugawara, Clamp's editor from the Weekly Shōnen Magazine's Editorial Department, took place after the story of Tsubasa: Reservoir Chronicle had progressed past the arc from Ōto Country. Ohkawa has stated that the group is very conscious of the fact that Tsubasa: Reservoir Chronicle is the title in Shōnen Magazine with the youngest readership and that it is their very first foray into the shōnen demographic. Thus, the members of Clamp ensure that they employ a drawing style and dialogue appropriate for young male audiences; the manga incorporates furigana that makes reading Japanese easier. To aid in this effort, the group holds conferences with Sugawara where they discuss the plot. Ohkawa stated during the interview that the only time the story significantly changed was during Country of Jade arc; It went from a "horror story with vampires" to a "detective mystery". Following the story in the Piffle Country, Clamp aimed to make the series darker and more complex, resulting in it receiving elements previously seen in other of their series. The Shura Country's story was written to introduce the idea that a dead person cannot be revived even if somebody travels back to the past and changes history. This theme would be further explored later in the story.

The members of Clamp had some difficulty adjusting to their typical style after deciding to publish with Weekly Shōnen Magazine. Because their typical thinner lines did not give the desired impact, Ohkawa expressed the group's desire to make their lines thicker, and to use simpler layouts similar to the other stories already present in Shōnen Magazine. She stated that they used their original artistic style to attract initial readers and then slowly transitioned to a new style. Sometime around when the story arc focused on the Country of Ōto took place, their art style had gradually been changing again; at this point they were thinking of returning to their original style. They were still adjusting to a weekly schedule; many of their previous works were on a monthly schedule. Sugawara expressed concerns about the strain on the artists of concurrently doing a weekly issue of Tsubasa: Reservoir Chronicle linked with xxxHolic, but in the end he whole-heartedly approved. In accordance with Ohkawa's desire for each to have a well-organized story, Clamp avoids putting references between the two stories too frequently. The main idea was connecting these two series was to have protagonists from two different manga with different personalities and designs. However, during the ending they would be stated to share the same existence, and had to go on different paths. As Tsubasa is connected with xxxHolic, the characters' designs are also meant to be similar; Like xxxHolic, the artwork is sometimes influenced by Ukiyo-e art style which leads to the characters have longer limbs. When asked if another series influenced Tsubasa in the concept of parallel worlds, Ohkawa replied that she was not a fan of sci-fi series and pointed that all worlds shown in the series were other works from Tsubasa. At the same time, she wanted to segregate Tsubasa from previous works. She also explained that while some characters are the same, their traits and personalities were modified due to different backstories.

When thinking about including character goods with the volume releases, Sugawara came up with the atypical idea of releasing a deluxe and normal edition of the manga after contemplating the inconsistency of novels getting both a soft-cover and hard-cover release, but manga only received one version. Because it was a new concept, the group experienced several mishaps such as accidentally placing a vertically flipped illustration on the first deluxe edition. The group also decided to use another atypical practice of keeping catchphrases that appeared in the magazine identical to the ones that appear on the frontispieces of the deluxe editions.

== Themes ==
Character identities is one of the main themes in Tsubasa as properly explored through the two teenagers called Syaoran who are nearly identical physically but share different personalities.

Tsubasa explores the fragility of human relationships through Sakura losing all of her memories involving her love interest, Syaoran. Despite this tragedy, Syaoran manages to become friends with other characters across his journey. Furthermore, Sakura once again develops feelings for Syaoran who at the same time starts falling for her again. The development of the characters' relationship demonstrates how while modern society depends on already existing one, a severed one can be reformed if people have the will. At the same time, Syaoran has to say goodbye to the people he met as a result of having to continue travelling. Despite also losing these newfound friends, these actions will help Syaoran grow into a young man. Based on the shōjo manga character Syaoran Li, the initial Syaoran from the series was written to be a shōnen manga lead instead. As a result, the narrative places emphasis on his friendships as he obtains new powers while retaining a kind demeanor. Although the series is a shōnen manga, Clamp incorporates shōjo manga motfifs into the character to attract a female demographic, with his desire to recover the magic feathers of Sakura being a common element of shōjo manga. The angel-like feathers and multiple outfits serve as a mean to appeal to the female demographic while the ending exploring the characters named Tsubasa serve as major symbolism about romantic relationships.

Sarahi Isuki Castella Olivera from Benemérita Universidad Autónoma de Puebla said that while the two Syaoran are nearly identical characters, they possess different hearts with the clone losing it in the series' second half as a result of being controlled by Fei Wang Reed. The differences between the two Syaoran's paths lead to both of them becoming their own separate beings. The same happens with the two Sakuras. The original Syaoran is said to fall into humiliation when he is forced to ask Fei Wang's help to protect the original Sakura. The concept of cloning is compared to buddhism zen as it coincides with the individualism of a person; Both Syaorans are often drawn together but their stances, weaponry and clothing is often made different and are found fighting against each other comparable to the yin and yang. Syaoran also has his own doppelgänger commonly referred as "The Other Syaoran" who at the same time shares the same identity as the protagonist from xxxHolic, Kimihiro Watanuki. Across the series, these character are developed and choose their own paths to earn their own identities.

== Media ==
=== Manga ===
Cover of the first volume of World Chronicle

Written and illustrated by Clamp, Tsubasa: Reservoir Chronicle was serialized in Japan in Kodansha's shōnen manga magazine Weekly Shōnen Magazine between May 21, 2003, (Note: The series started in the magazine's 25th issue of 2003 (cover date June 4), released on May 21 of the same year.) to October 7, 2009. Its 233 chapters, which are called "Chapitre" (シャピトル, Shapitoru), French for "Chapter", have been compiled into twenty-eight tankōbon volumes by Kodansha, with the first volume released on August 9, 2003, and the last one on November 17, 2009. All the volumes were also released in deluxe editions containing color pages and new illustrations at the same time as the original release.

In June 2014, Kodansha's Magazine Special announced a new manga of Tsubasa would start serialization in August that year and that it would be connected to xxxHolic Rei. Titled Tsubasa: WoRLD CHRoNiCLE, the series has also been licensed by Kodansha USA for English release. A single chapter was also serialized in the Weekly Shōnen Magazine in February 2015.

Tsubasa was one of the first four manga series licensed for English release in North America by Del Rey Manga and was acquired together with Mobile Suit Gundam SEED, Negima! Magister Negi Magi, and xxxHolic in January 2004. Del Rey released the first volume of the series on April 27, 2004, and the last one on November 23, 2010. Kodansha USA is due to re-release it in omnibus format during 2014. Tanoshimi, the United Kingdom branch of Random House, published the first 14 volumes as published by Del Rey in the United Kingdom, between August 3, 2006 and June 5, 2008.

=== Anime series ===
The animation studio Bee Train adapted the manga series into a two-season anime television series Tsubasa Chronicle (ツバサ･クロニクル, Tsubasa Kuronikuru) spanning fifty-two episodes in total. Both seasons were written by Hiroyuki Kawasaki and directed by Kōichi Mashimo, with Hiroshi Morioka joining on as co-director for the second season. The music for the series was composed by Yuki Kajiura. The first season aired Saturday nights at 18:30 on NHK-E from April 9, 2005, to October 15, 2005, and spanned 26 episodes. The second season began on April 29, 2006, at 18:30 and concluded on November 4, 2006; it spanned twenty-six episodes. In Japan, Bandai Visual released the series across fourteen Region 2 DVD compilation volumes between August 26, 2005, and February 23, 2007. Two DVD box sets were then released on October 26, 2011, and November 25, 2011.

Funimation (later Crunchyroll, LLC) licensed both seasons under the title Tsubasa: Reservoir Chronicle for English-language release January 2006. They released the TV series in North America across twelve Region 1 DVD compilation volumes. Funimation released the DVDs in two collections, where each contains six of the DVDs together in a box set, on November 11, 2008, and December 29, 2009. A DVD box with the first season and the film was released on January 19, 2010. It was re-released in Blu-ray format on May 4, 2010, in a package that also included the anime's second season. Funimation also released the first season of Tsubasa: Reservoir Chronicle in the United Kingdom through Revelation Films beginning on September 17, 2007, across six Region 2 DVD compilation volumes. The English dub of the first season was broadcast on the Funimation Channel in the United States. Revelation Films had previously confirmed the release of the second season of Tsubasa Chronicle in the U.K., although no release dates were ever set.

=== Theatrical film ===
A film interlude, Tsubasa Reservoir Chronicle the Movie: The Princess in the Birdcage Kingdom, was adapted by the animation studio Production I.G and premiered in Japanese theaters on August 20, 2005, in conjunction with xxxHolic: A Midsummer Night's Dream, between the two seasons of the anime series. Its plot continues the journey from Syaoran's group for Sakura's feathers. They locate one at the Country of Birdcages, where they have to confront the world's king in order to obtain it. It was directed by Itsuro Kawasaki and written by Midori Goto and Junichi Fujisaku. Character designs were provided by Yoko Kikuchi, and music was by Yuki Kajiura. Clamp artist Ageha Ohkawa liked how both films were connected, despite that both have different themes. Shochiku released the DVD for the film on February 25, 2006, in Japan in both regular and premium editions. Funimation released the film on a single DVD in English on February 19, 2009, in North America as a double feature with the xxxHolic film. It was released alongside a DVD box of the anime's first season on January 19, 2010. It was re-released in Blu-ray format on May 4, 2010, in a package that included the anime's second season.

=== Original video animations ===
Two original video animation (OVA) series were animated by Production I.G. They were directed by Shunsuke Tada and written by Nanase Ohkawa, with music provided by Yuki Kajiura. A three-episode OVA series titled Tsubasa Tokyo Revelations (ツバサ TOKYO REVELATIONS) was released between November 16, 2007, and March 17, 2008, across three DVDs bundled with limited versions of volumes 21, 22, and 23 of the manga. Their plot is set after the anime's ending, and follows the arrival of Syaoran's group in a postapocalyptic Tokyo, where the connection between Syaoran and a teenager identical to him is revealed. A two-episode OVA series titled Tsubasa Spring Thunder Chronicles (ツバサ春雷記, Tsubasa Shunraiki) was released across two DVDs. The first was packaged with volume 26 of the manga, which was released on March 17, 2009; and the second was packaged with volume 27, released on May 15, 2009. They are set after the characters' journey to Seresu as they search for a way to make Sakura's soul return to her body. In May 2010, Funimation announced they licensed both series of OVAs. They were released together under the title of "Tsubasa: RESERVoir CHRoNiCLE – OVA Collection" in both DVD and Blu-ray formats on January 4, 2011. In June 2011, Funimation started streaming the five episodes on their official website.

=== Audio CDs ===
The original soundtrack for the anime was released in four soundtrack albums titled Future Soundscape I~IV. They were released by Victor Entertainment for the anime from July 6, 2005, to September 21, 2006, each in a normal and a limited edition that featured additional merchandise. Additionally, a compilation album titled Best Vocal Collection was released on December 20, 2006, that collected fourteen vocal tracks from the anime. Each release charted on the Oricon charts, and the highest ranking album, Future Soundscape I, peaked at 39th and remained on the charts for three weeks.

Ten music albums have been released, and each contains a single piece of theme music for the various adaptations. For the anime adaptation Tsubasa Chronicle, four maxi singles titled Loop, Blaze, It's, and Kazemachi Jet / Spica were released between May 10, 2005, and July 14, 2006. For the anime film Tsubasa Chronicle the Movie: The Princess of the Country of Birdcages, two maxi singles titled Aerial and Amrita were released on August 17, 2005, and on August 18, 2005. For the OVA adaptations, two maxi singles and two studio albums titled Synchronicity, Saigo no Kajitsu / Mitsubashi to Kagakusha, Kazeyomi, and Everlasting Songs were released between November 21, 2007, and February 25, 2009. All of the releases charted on the Oricon charts, with the highest ranking single being Loop, which peaked at 7th and remained on the chart for nine weeks.

Victor Entertainment released a series of three drama CDs titled "The Matinée of the Palace", based on the anime adaptation featuring the same voice actors. The first, subtitled Chapter.1 ~Coral, the City on the Water~, was released on December 16, 2005. Chapter.2 ~Impossible Goal~ followed on February 1, 2006. The final CD, subtitled Chapter.3 ~Unspeakable Lines~, was released on March 24, 2006. All of the releases charted on the Oricon charts, with the highest ranking album being Chapter.2 ~Impossible Goal~, peaking at 161st and remaining on the chart for a week. A spin-off series of four drama CDs titled "Private High School Holitsuba" have been released between 2006 and 2009, and has also had a one-chapter manga adaptation. Set in an alternate universe, the series features characters from Tsubasa and xxxHolic as students and teachers from the fictional school "Holitsuba".

=== Video games ===
A video game titled Tsubasa Chronicle (ツバサクロニクル) developed by Cavia, based on the anime adaptation of the same name, was released in Japan for the Nintendo DS on October 27, 2005, by Arika. Tsubasa Chronicle is a role-playing game whose gameplay requires the player to navigate the world as Sakura and Syaoran in search of Sakura's memory fragments. Players can compete with each other Wirelessly. A sequel titled Tsubasa Chronicle Volume 2 (ツバサクロニクル Vol.2) was released on April 20, 2006, again for the Nintendo DS and shares various gameplay traits with Tsubasa Chronicle.

=== Art and fanbooks ===
Two different fanbooks have been released for the anime of Tsubasa: Reservoir Chronicle. Kodansha released two in Japan by between 2005 and 2006 that contain character illustrations and information, a collection of the theme song videos, and interviews with the voice actors. The first book published was TV Animation Tsubasa Chronicle Official Fanbook (TV ANIMATION ツバサ･クロニクル OFFICIAL FANBOOK) on May 17, 2005. The second book published was TV Animation Tsubasa Chronicle 2nd Season Official Fanbook (TV ANIMATION ツバサ･クロニクル 2nd SEASON OFFICIAL FANBOOK) on June 16, 2006. DH Publishing released one in English on May 25, 2008, titled Tsubasa Chronicle Factbook: Mystery, Magic and Mischief, the eighteenth of the Mysteries and Secrets Revealed! series of books. In Japan, Kodansha will release another guidebook on December 31, 2016.

Three different artbooks which contain illustrations have been released in Japan by Kodansha between 2006 and 2009. The first book published was TV Animation Tsubasa Chronicle Best Selection (TV ANIMATION ツバサ･クロニクル BEST SELECTION) on April 17, 2006, bearing an ISBN 978-4-06-372138-6. The second book published was Tsubasa Original Illustrations Collection –Album De Reproductions- (ツバサ原画集-ALBuM De REProDUCTioNS-) on April 17, 2007, and containing art from the first 14 volumes. An English version of ALBuM De REProDUCTioNS was released on December 8, 2009. This contained one of the short stories titled Tsubasa: World of the Untold Story that also featured as omake to the manga volumes. Another artbook, Tsubasa Original Illustrations Collection –Album De Reproductions- 2 (ツバサ原画集-ALBuM De REProDUCTioNS- 2), was released on November 17, 2009, containing art from the final 14 volumes.

Two character guides were released by Kodansha in Japan and then translated and released in North American by Del Rey Manga. They contain overviews of the worlds, overviews of characters, fan reports, illustrations, and interviews. The Tsubasa: Reservoir Chronicle Character Guide (ツバサ CARACTere GuiDE, Tsubasa Caractère Guide) was released on April 15, 2005, covering events from volume 1 to volume 7. It was released in English on December 26, 2006. The Tsubasa: Reservoir Chronicle Character Guide 2 (ツバサ CARACTere GuiDE 2, Tsubasa Caractère Guide 2) was released on October 17, 2006. It was released in English on October 13, 2009. Another related book is Soel and Larg: The Adventures of Mokona Modoki (ソエルとラーグ―モコナ=モドキの冒険, Soel to Larg: Mokona=Modoki no Bōken) which was released by Kodansha on July 17, 2004. It is set prior to the events of xxxHolic and Tsubasa and tells the lives from the two Mokona Modoki ever since their creation by Clow Reed and Yūko Ichihara.

There are two guidebooks focused in the soundtrack used in the anime adaptation of Tsubasa: Reservoir Chronicle that were published in Japan by Kodansha. The first one, Tsubasa Chronicle Piano Solo Album (楽しいバイエル併用 ツバサクロニクル ピアノソロアルバム), was released on August 30, 2005, and focused on piano sheet music for tracks from the series' soundtrack album bearing an ISBN 978-4-28-510386-1. The second one, Tsubasa Chronicle Piano Solo Album 2 (楽しいバイエル併用 ツバサクロニクル ピアノソロアルバム オープニング・エンディング・劇中曲を収載!!), ISBN 978-4-28-510885-9 was published on July 24, 2006, and it had piano sheet music for several soundtracks.

== Reception ==
=== Manga ===
The Tsubasa: Reservoir Chronicle manga series was well received by Japanese readers, and appeared at various times on lists of best-selling volumes. In September 2009, it was announced that the first 27 volumes had sold over 20 million copies in Japan, becoming one of Clamp's best selling titles. In its debut, the first volume of World Chronicle sold 127.643 units. After the first volume's English release on April 27, 2004, it sold 2,330 copies in May 2004, placing it at the top end of the top 100 sales of that month. It was fifth on Waldenbooks's 2004 list, obtaining the highest place ever by a manga volume. It was consistently ranked in the top 10 of the list of Manga Top 50 for every quarterly release of the "ICv2 Retailers Guide to Anime/Manga", based on sales from both mainstream bookstores and comic book shops, since its release in May 2004, except for the fourth quarter of 2007, reaching a top rank of number 3. By November 2006, over a million manga volumes from the series had been sold in North America by Del Rey Manga. The series was also listed as the nineteenth best-selling manga from North America in 2010 by ICv2. In the Society for the Promotion of Japanese Animation Award from 2009, Tsubasa: Reservoir Chronicle was the winner in the category "Best Manga – Action". About.com placed it twenty-ninth in their article "36 Great Manga Missed by the Eisner Awards", while the artbook Tsubasa ALBuM De REProDUCTioNS was third in their 2009 poll "Best Manga Book". In Mania Entertainment's "Best Manga Awards For 2005", Tsubasa was third in the category "Best Shōnen". It was a nominee for the American Anime Awards in 2007, but was one of the last series announced due to an error made by the people in charge.

Tsubasa: Reservoir Chronicle was fairly well received by reviewers, who described it as a treat for Clamp fans due to the large number of crossover characters in the series. Initial fan response to Tsubasa: Reservoir Chronicle was that it was "Cardcaptor Sakura for guys". Fans speculated that the series would conclude one of Clamp's unfinished series, X, or that it would be a sequel to Cardcaptor Sakura that focused on the character Syaoran Li. Critics described the series as being marked by several plot twists, with About.com writer Katherine Luther labelling it as "perhaps the "twistiest" of twists that we have seen in anime and manga in quite some time". For the earlier half of the series, Mikhail Koulikov from Anime News Network described the series as settling into a "predictable pattern" that Melissa Harper, also from Anime News Network, described as somewhat slow, and "frankly a bit boring". However, Michael Aronson from Manga Life found the series appealing and accessible to readers who have not read other Clamp series, and he hoped it would remain this accessible for following volumes. He found that the relation between Tsubasa: Reservoir Chronicle and xxxHolic would persuade readers to also read the latter series. Mania Entertainment's Megan Lavey found the introduction to be a "pretty simple love story", while liking the characters' personalities. She liked how the series was connected with xxxHolic and hoped that both series would continue crossing over. In a general overview of the manga, Julie Gray from Comic Book Bin gave positive remarks to the characters' complex personalities and how the plot has been developed throughout its first ten volumes. She recommended that people should buy the series. Active Anime's Blake Waymire found that the change of settings was well done, and he noted how some story arcs could go from dramatic to charming.

From volume 15 onwards, Clamp unleashed a series of "mind-blowing" plot twists that had been foreshadowed frequently throughout the series. These twists have been described by Anime News Network as "stunning" but confusingly executed due to the sheer number of storylines coming together. Other critics praised the pacing as letting "the story progress at its own natural momentum", keeping the reader "from being bored by any one literary genre". The plot twists and the ever-changing relationships between the manga's main characters were praised; "few manga creators could pull off this sort of outrageous storytelling stunt". Active Anime writer Holly Ellingwood called the plot twists as "the most shocking set of events in the Tsubasa Reservoir Chronicles to date!", finding that despite such twists, more secrets were brought to readers to persuade them to read the following volumes. Ellingwood also reviewed following volumes and found the last plot revelations intriguing; she enjoyed that a strong connection is revealed between characters from Tsubasa and xxxHolic. Comic Book Resources regarded the ending of the series as bittersweet homage to Cardcaptor Sakura due to the clones disappearing and the original Syaoran separating from Sakura despite confessing their mutual love. Manga News praised the ending for the heavy focus on the clones of Syaoran and Sakura, giving emotional scenes as well and their relationship Yuko and Fei-Wang Reed but lamented Fai and Kurogane had less prominent roles.

Critics have described the artwork as "keeping up the standards expected of Clamp" with its high level of detail, though perhaps too much detail, especially during action sequences. The artstyle is "stylish" and "dynamic", characterized by a large number of "sweeping lines curlicues that look unlike anything else in the genre" that help bring the action scenes to life for exciting experiences. Ed Sizemore from Comics Worth Reading highlighted the fact that each dimension that the protagonists visit is characterized by its very own look and feel so that "no two worlds are even remotely similar". However, the amount of detail and lack of contrast, while beautiful, often render scenes incomprehensible to the point where the reader is left guessing who is attacking. Critics have praised Del Rey's inclusion of English translation notes that aid in understanding the plot, especially due to its crossover nature. Lavey found the translation a "good read", liking how some Japanese words were not translated and instead explained in notes. The handling of fight scenes, most notably Syaoran's, was highly praised. Paul Price lists both Tsubasa series as examples of isekai in "A Survey of the Story Elements of Isekai Manga" for the Journal of Anime and Manga Studies, describing them as "immersive", examples of isekai where there is no portal between worlds and all the action takes place in fantastical other worlds rather than the real world.

=== Anime ===
Critics have described the anime adaptation as having a very slow pace but having a beautiful musical score. Carl Kimlinger from Anime News Network faulted the director, Koichi Mashimo, for "downshifting the plot's energy" and as having "too many flashbacks, too many slow pans over inexpressive eyes", that create an end-product that is "tediously formulaic". Active Anime's Christopher Seaman had mixed feelings, finding the romantic themes mature and the magical themes appealing to younger audiences; he concluded that "teens would get the most out of the series." He recommended the series in general, praising its plot and its themes. DVDTalk's Todd Douglass Jr. ranked the anime DVD box as "Highly Recommended"; he liked how, despite borrowing elements from other series, it was "entirely self-contained". Douglas pointed out that following its second season, the anime kept entertaining viewers, and felt they would not find a reason to dislike it. Douglas enjoyed the anime's storytelling. He liked its characters, but found it sometimes dragging due to its episodic nature. Kimlinger praised the musical score as being beautiful, as Yuki Kajiura's work has always been. Chris Beveridge from Mania Entertainment made similar comments, praising the series' score and animation, while commenting on the series' accessibility. He said that people unrelated with Clamp's works would like Tsubasa, in contrast to other people who would "get out of the series". Its episodic nature was praised by Luther, who commented how the main plot was connected to each of the story arcs. The English cast for the anime has been labelled as "done and very solid". IGN's Jeffrey Harris felt Christopher Sabat was its best actor. Harris called the anime "a nice looking and at times elegant looking show", pointing to the traits of the main characters. He criticized the lack of extras in the DVDs releases. Reviewing the anime's and xxxHolic's films, IGN writer N.S. Davidson said the Tsubasa film would be appealing to viewers of the series, despite its short length. He liked how both films' storylines interacted, allowing parts of the plot of Tsubasa to be explained in the xxxHolic film, and he found artistic similarities between the two films. Carlo Santos was more critical of the film but still called it "good art". In a TV Asahi poll, Tsubasa: Reservoir Chronicle was ranked as the fifty-ninth most popular anime in Japan. It ranked ninth in Animage's Anime Grand Prix anime popularity poll from 2005, while it was also listed as an "Honorable Mention" in IGN's "Top Ten Anime of 2007" feature.

Although the Tsubasa OVAs were not the first original animation DVDs (OADs), OVAs published with manga volumes, its release helped to popularize the term. Chris Beveridge from Mania Entertainment considered the OVAs to have better quality than the TV series, mainly because they were developed by Production I.G instead of Bee Train and because they have a darker storyline. In a further review, Beveridge found fascinating the events occurring in the OVAs due to the number of revelations changed the way people viewed the series. The character designs were felt to be more similar to the manga's ones than the TV series, while the animation has been considered "a notch above that of standard Television". The themes were noted to be more mature both brutally and mentally; although the number of changes presented throughout them has been praised, another series of OVAs that would conclude the storyline built in the last episode from Spring Thunder Chronicles has been requested by reviewers.
