= Magic Knight Rayearth (2026 TV series) =

2026 Japanese anime series

- Japanese: 魔法騎士(マジックナイト)レイアース
- Revised Hepburn: Majikku Naito Reiāsu
- Genre: Adventure, Action, Isekai, Mecha, Sword and sorcery
- Based on: Magic Knight Rayearth by Clamp
- Directed by: Yui Miura
- Series composition: Shigeru Murakoshi
- Character designer: Satomi Watabe
- Music by: Yuki Kajiura; Takumi Ozawa; Shiho Terada
- Country of origin: Japan
- Original language: Japanese
- No. of episodes: 21

Production
- Art director: Kazumaru Ando
- Sound director: Shūhei Abe
- Cinematographer: Hitoshi Tamura
- Editor: Keisuke Yanagi
- Animation producer: Hitomi Umeda
- Studios: E&H Production (Animation); TMS Entertainment (Production) (Note: Under the "Unlimited Produce by TMS" label.)
- Executive producers: Ko Kitaoka; Shin Furukawa; Yukiko Shirakura
- Producers: Ari Sawada; Nozomi Matsuura; Takuma Kishida
- Production companies: Kodansha; TMS Entertainment; TV Asahi

Original release
- Network: ANN (TV Asahi)
- Release: October 7, 2026 – present

Magic Knight Rayearth (Japanese: 魔法騎士(マジックナイト)レイアース, Hepburn: Majikku Naito Reiāsu) is a 2026 Japanese anime television series based on the manga series of the same title by manga artist group Clamp. Produced by TMS Entertainment with animation by E&H Production, it is the third anime adaptation of the manga following the 1994 anime series and the 1997 original video animation. The series is directed by Yui Miura, written by Shigeru Murakoshi, character designed by Satomi Watabe and music co-composed by Yuki Kajiura, Takumi Ozawa and Shiho Terada. It premiered on TV Asahi's IMAnimation W programming block on October 7, 2026.

== Plot ==
During their trip at the Tokyo Tower, three fourteen year-olds from separate schools, Hikaru Shidou, Umi Ryuuzaki, and Fuu Hououji, are suddenly transported to a place called Cefiro after hearing the plea from a princess named Émeraude. With the guidance from Clef, the three girls venture throughout the land by learning magic and acquiring weapons in order to save Cefiro from the evils of Zagato.

== Production and release ==
In October 2025, it was announced that a new anime adaptation of manga artist group Clamp's Magic Knight Rayearth manga series was in development. In March 2026, the main staff was revealed; Yui Miura is directing the series at E&H Production, Shigeru Murakoshi as a lead writer, Satomi Watabe is designing the characters and music co-composed by Yuki Kajiura, Takumi Ozawa and Shiho Terada, with TMS Entertainment producing the series. The main voice cast members were also announced that same day, with Ayane Sakura as Hikaru Shidou, Rumi Okubo as Umi Ryuuzaki and Rie Takahashi as Fuu Hououji. Clamp sent a letter and an illustration to the staff and cast to congratulate them for the new anime adaptation. In June of that year, it was announced that Saori Hayami, Yūki Ono and Mika Kikuchi was cast as Princess Émeraude, Zagato, and Mokona respectively. The following month in July, additional cast members were announced: Yuki Kaji, Emiri Katō and Yoshitsugu Matsuoka as Clef, Presea and Ferio respectively. In September of that year, it was revealed that Mamiko Noto, Ayumu Murase, Hitomi Ueda and Hiroki Yasumoto was cast as Alcyone, Ascot, Caldina and Lafarga respectively.

In an interview with director Yui Miura and creative producer Sunghoo Park, they revealed that Park had chosen Miura to direct the new series after previously working together on Jujutsu Kaisen. Miura had many discussions with the team, but eventually deciding to closely follow the manga, even by using Clamp's older style to preserve the feeling from that era. Miura added that the Rune Gods are mostly shown in 3DCG, as well as incorporating additional episodes to enrich the story. Interview with voice actresses Rie Takahashi and Saori Hayami also revealed that their main goal was to honor the manga, while drawing their inspirations from both the original material and the first anime series.

The series premiered on October 7, 2026, on the IMAnimation W programming block on TV Asahi and its affiliates. The first opening theme song is "Otome no Tsurugi" (乙女の剣; 'A Young Lady's Sword'), performed by Toaka, and the first ending theme song is "Hoshiakari" (星灯; 'Starlight'), performed by Yurina Kawaguchi. The insert song used for the first episode is "Yuzurenai Negai" (｢ゆずれない願い｣; lit. 'Unyielding Wish') by Naomi Tamura, an opening theme song that used for the first anime series.

Crunchyroll is streaming the series. Medialink licensed the series in East, South and Southeast Asia for streaming on the Ani-One Asia YouTube channel.

Prior to the television airing, the first two episodes were previewed at Anime Expo on July 5, 2026.

== Episodes ==
| No. | Title | Direction | Screenplay | Storyboard | Animation direction | Original release date |
|---|---|---|---|---|---|---|
| 1 | "From Another World"; Transliteration: "Isekai yori" (Japanese: 異世界より) | Yui Miura | Shigeru Murakoshi | Yui Miura | Takahiro Yoshimatsu, Akai Masanao, Nanako Nonomiya, Yuki Soncho; Satomi Watabe (Chief) | October 7, 2026 |
In 1993, schoolgirls Hikaru Shidou, Umi Ryuuzaki, and Fuu Hououji are present at Tokyo Tower for a school trip when they hear a plea for the legendary "Magic Knights" before being transported to another world. The sorcerer Guru Clef then greets them and explains that they were summoned to the world of Cefiro by Princess Emeraude. He admits that there is no way to send them back to Tokyo unless they save Cefiro. He further explains that Princess Emeraude has been kidnapped by a villain named Zagato, and Cefiro has fallen into chaos since Emeraude has been sustaining the world with her force of will. In addition, only people from other worlds have the potential of becoming Magic Knights who can awaken the Rune Gods, which is why they were summoned. Clef then grants the three girls their own magic spells. Meanwhile, Zagato witnesses the arrival of the three girls and sends his minion Alcyone to eliminate them. Clef senses Alcyone's arrival and sends the girls away to flee to the west while he holds Alcyone, bidding them to become Magic Knights like he hopes.
| 2 | "The Legend Begins"; Transliteration: "Densetsu no Hajimari" (Japanese: 伝説の始まり) | Yuji Kanzai | Shigeru Murakoshi | Yui Miura | Miyuki Sugawara, Kyoko Kotani, Mingi Han, DR MOVIE; Takahiro Yoshimatsu (Chief) | October 14, 2026 |
Alcyone, who was Clef's former student, summons a beast to keep him busy while she pursues the Magic Knights. With no other way to defend themselves, Hikaru recalls the lesson about magic that Clef taught her, and she instinctively casts an Arrow of Fire spell that defeats Alcyone. Meanwhile, it is revealed Clef deliberately allowed Alcyone to chase the Magic Knights to test if they were capable of facing Zagato, while Zagato himself warns Clef not to interfere with his plans. Eventually, the Magic Knights reach their destination, the Forest of Silence where they are to meet Presea, a friend of Clef. They find a house in the woods and enter it, encountering a magical creature named Mokona before being caught in a trap set by Presea. Upon realizing the identity of the Magic Knights, Presea formally introduces herself as Presea the Pharl, Cefiro's finest artisan.
| 3 | "All in the Same Boat"; Transliteration: "Unmei Kyōdōtai" (Japanese: 運命共同体) | Takayuki Sano | Akira Yoneyama | Takayuki Sano | Asumi Kato, Miyuki Sugawara, Kei Ajiki, Yuki Kitajima, Fincrossed Studio; Satomi Watabe (Chief) | October 21, 2026 |
Presea agrees to forge weapons for the Magic Knights, but tells them that they first need to travel through the Forest of Silence and collect special escudo ore from the Spring of Eterna. She also loans them basic weapons so they can defend themselves, while also giving them Mokona. Meawhile, Alcyone pleads with Zagato to give her another chance to eliminate the Magic Knights, to which he agrees. Back at the forest, the Magic Knights quickly get lost and run into a large monster. They team up and manage to defeat it with their new weapons, and begin bonding together as friends. They are then attacked by a second monster, but it is destroyed by a mysterious warrior who asks who they are.
| 4 | "Our Battle"; Transliteration: "Watashitachi no Tatakai" (Japanese: 私たちの戦い) | Saki Fujishiro | Kazuhiko Inukai | Hisatoshi Shimizu | Akai Masanao, Hajime Yoshida, Fincossed Studio, DR MOVIE; Takahiro Yoshimatsu (Chief) | October 28, 2026 |
The warrior introduces himself as Ferio, and reveals he is journeying to Eterna to search for escudo ore as well. Fuu bluffs Ferio, claiming to know how to reach Eterna and offering to show him the way in return for him escorting them there. The jewel on Mokona's head then glows, showing the way out of the Forest of Silence. The Magic Knights and Ferio work together to fight their way through a number of monsters, with Ferio even saving Fuu's life. However, once they exit the forest, they are ambushed by Alycone, who gravely wounds Umi. Angered, Hikaru uses her magic to retaliate, but is still at a disadvantage. Seeing Hikaru is in trouble, Umi wishes for her own magic, which triggers Clef telepathically communicating with her through Mokona and awakening her power. Umi turns the tide with her Dragon of Water spell, defeating Alycone. Clef also awakens Fuu's magic, Winds of Healing, which she uses to heal Umi's wounds. After witnessing the battle, Ferio comes to realize the girls really are the Magic Knights.
| 5 | "One-of-a-Kind Weapons"; Transliteration: "Knoyo no Hitotsu no Buki" (Japanese: この世で一つの武器) | Gota Yoshimoto | Kazuhiko Inukai | Koki Aoshima | Mayuko Yamamoto, Emi Kojima, Seung-hee Ha, Kele Tang, Wei Ching Xiao, Ting Xuan Jian, Fincrossed Studio; Satomi Watabe (Chief) | November 4, 2026 |
Ferio tells the Magic Knights that he is a close comrade of Emeraude and is aware of the legend, but even he is not sure why only people from another world are suitable to become Magic Knights. Having completed his duty to escort them out of the forest, Ferio takes his leave, but not before flirting with Fuu. The Magic Knights then continue to follow Mokona is it leads them towards Eterna. Meanwhile, Alycone limps her way back to Zagato to beg for forgiveness, but he instead kills her as punishment for her failure. He then assigns another of his lieutenants, Ascot, to eliminate the Magic Knights. After fighting their way through more monsters, the Magic Knights find Eterna and enter it, but end up getting separated. Hikaru is attacked by her dog Hikari, Umi is attacked by her parents, and Fuu is attacked by a doppelganger of herself. All three girls are unwilling to fight back against their loved ones until Emeraude manages to communicate with them and points out the entities attacking them are imposters. Realizing the truth in Emeraude's words, the Magic Knights fight back and prevail, finding the escudo ore which upgrades their magical armor upon touching it. Presea then arrives, congratulating the Magic Knights as she forges the ore into unique magical swords for each of them.
| 6 | "Rune Gods"; Transliteration: "Mashin" (Japanese: 魔神) | Miyu Amano | Akira Yoneyama | Takayuki Sano | Miyuki Sugawara, Komoro Kawai, Masataka Akai, Momo Amai, Min Ki Han, Fincrossed Studio, DR MOVIE; Takahiro Yoshimatsu (Chief) | November 11, 2026 |
Presea explains that the Magic Knights' weapons and armor will continue to grow along with them, and tells them their next step is to revive the Rune Gods to cement their status as Magic Knights. Mokona then summons a flying vehicle to take the Magic Knights to the Rune Gods, and they bid farewell to Presea. Mokona then guides them to an underwater temple where they encounter one of the Rune Gods, Ceres, who takes the form a blue dragon. Ceres instructs Umi that she must show her strength of heart to him. Ascot then arrives and attacks Hikaru and Fuu with an army of summoned monsters. Seeing her friends in trouble, Umi fights off the monsters and demands Ascot apologize for insulting her friends. However, upon realizing Ascot considers his summoned monsters as friends, Umi shows compassion to him, telling him he shouldn't have to follow Zagato's orders as long as he stands by his friends. Touched by Umi's compassion, Ascot befriends her. The Magic Knights' weapons and armor evolve once again, and Ceres reveals his true form as a giant mecha. He admits he is impressed with Umi' strength of heart, but she is not yet ready to don him as he stores himself inside her armor. Zagato witnesses Ascot's failure while another lieutenant, Lady Caldina, volunteers to eliminate the Magic Knights.
| 7 | "Something More Precious than Cefiro"; Transliteration: "Sefīro yori Taisetsuna Mono" (Japanese: セフィーロより大切なもの) | Chie Nishizawa; Sunghoo Park | Shigeru Murakoshi | Chie Nishizawa | Asumi Kato, Emi Kojima, Kyoko Kotani, Fincrossed Studio; Satomi Watabe (Chief) | November 18, 2026 |
The Magic Knights leave the Temple of Water and head for the Temple of Wind that is suspended in the sky. Fuu is suddenly whisked away by the Rune God Windom, who takes the form of a large bird. Hikaru and Umi try to follow Fuu inside the temple, but encounter Caldina. Windom bids Fuu to prove her strength of heart to him, just as Hikaru and Umi arrive and attack her. Caldina reveals that she has hypnotized them to attack her, but Fuu is able to restrain them with a Winds of Penance spell. Caldina then uses her dancing skills to seize control of Fuu's body and forces her to attack Hikaru and Umi. However, Fuu is able to resist at the last second and defeats Caldina with a Emerald Gale spell. She explains that her strength of heart is stronger than Caldina's, since Caldina is unwilling to die for Zagato while she is willing to die for her friends. Caldina admits defeat, claiming that Zagato did not pay her enough to risk her life. She does reveal that Zagato is fighting for something he values more than Cefiro before retreating. Windom recognizes Fuu's strength, upgrading the Magic Knights' armor and weapons once againt. He reveals his mecha form and stores himself inside her armor until the day she is ready to wield him. Seeing that the Magic Knights are close to reviving all three Rune Gods, Zagato sends another lieutenant, Rafaga, to intercept them at the Temple of Flame.
