= Magic Knight Rayearth =

Japanese manga series by Clamp and its adaptations

- Cover art of Tokyopop's re-release of Magic Knight Rayearth I Volume 1, featuring Hikaru Shidou

魔法騎士(マジックナイト)レイアース (Majikku Naito Reiāsu)
- Genre: Magic Knight Rayearth: Adventure, Action, Isekai, Mecha, Sword and sorcery; Rayearth: Dark fantasy
- Manga
- Written by: Clamp
- Published by: Kodansha
- English publisher: NA: Kodansha Comics
- Magazine: Nakayoshi
- English magazine: NA: MixxZine
- Original run: November 1993 – April 1996
- Volumes: 6
- Anime television series
- Directed by: Toshihiro Hirano
- Produced by: Mikihiro Iwata; Michihiko Suwa; Shigeki Nakamura; Masahito Yoshioka
- Written by: Keiko Maruo; Nanase Ohkawa
- Music by: Hayato Matsuo
- Studio: Tokyo Movie Shinsha
- Licensed by: BI: Anime Limited; NA: Discotek Media
- Original network: NNS (YTV, NTV)
- English network: SG: Kids Central
- Original run: October 17, 1994 – November 27, 1995
- Episodes: 49
- Original video animation

Rayearth
- Directed by: Toshihiro Hirano
- Written by: Manabu Nakamura
- Music by: Toshihiko Sahashi
- Studio: TMS-Kyokuichi
- Licensed by: BI: Crunchyroll UK and Ireland; NA: Manga Entertainment
- Released: July 25, 1997 – December 10, 1997
- Runtime: 45 minutes (each)
- Episodes: 3
- Anime television series
- Magic Knight Rayearth (2026)
- icon

Magic Knight Rayearth (Japanese: 魔法騎士(マジックナイト)レイアース, Hepburn: Majikku Naito Reiāsu) is a Japanese manga series written and illustrated by Clamp. Appearing as a serial in the manga magazine Nakayoshi from the November 1993 issue to the February 1995 issue, the chapters of Magic Knight Rayearth were collected into three bound volumes by Kodansha. They were published from July 1994 to March 1995. A sequel was serialized in the same manga magazine from the March 1995 issue to the April 1996 issue. It was published by Kodansha in three bound volumes from July 1995 to April 1996.

The series follows three eighth-grade girls who find themselves transported from modern-day Japan into a magical world, where they are tasked with rescuing a princess. Rayearth combines elements from the magical girl and mecha anime genres with parallel world fantasy. The manga was adapted into two anime series in 1994 and an original video animation (OVA) in 1997. A new anime series premiered in October 2026.

== Plot ==
Magic Knight Rayearth focuses on three eighth-grade girls: the tomboyish, headstrong but short Hikaru Shidou (獅堂 光, Shidō Hikaru); the quick-tempered and no-nonsense only child Umi Ryuuzaki (龍咲 海, Ryūzaki Umi); and the intelligent and ladylike Fuu Hououji (鳳凰寺 風, Hōōji Fū). While on a field trip to the Tokyo Tower with their respective schools, the girls find themselves drawn into another world, Cephiro. There they learn that Cephiro is influenced by one's will and that the Pillar maintains Cephiro through prayer. The girls are then tasked with rescuing the current Pillar, Princess Emeraude, from her abductor, the high priest and antagonist Zagato, after which they will be returned to Tokyo.

Guided by the creature Mokona on their quest, the girls discover their respective element-based magic and awaken the three Rune-Gods (魔神, Mashin), creatures who can take the form of giant robots that the girls must pilot. As the girls progress on their journey, they overcome their differences, learning how to work together and accept each other as friends. After the girls find Zagato, they fight and are able to destroy him. After this, they finally reach where Emeraude is imprisoned, but the three learn that she had fallen in love with Zagato, which had hindered her ability to pray solely for Cephiro's well-being. Feeling responsible for her actions, she had imprisoned herself, and eventually summoned the Magic Knights to kill her, as no one from Cephiro could harm the Pillar. Her dark side then takes over, seeking to destroy the Magic Knights for killing her love. After a short defensive fight against Princess Emeraude, the Magic Knights have no choice but to kill her. They then find themselves transported back to Tokyo.

The second part of the series deals with the complications caused by Princess Emeraude's death. Set a year later, it opens with the three protagonists struggling with their guilt and despair over their role in her death. Meeting again at Tokyo Tower, they find themselves transported mysteriously to Cephiro again, and discover that only a single piece of Cephiro remains, which holds a castle where the survivors gather to take refuge. With the Pillar gone, Cephiro is, for the most part, defenseless, and the girls are saddened to learn that a new Pillar must be chosen by the Pillar system before the whole planet is destroyed. Not only that, three warring planets have begun their attempts to conquer the Pillar-less Cephiro: Autozam, a technologically advanced world which intends to use the Pillar system to remove the pollution in its air; Fahren, whose childish ruler Lady Aska plans to use it to turn Cephiro into a world of her whims; and Chizeta, an overpopulated world whose sibling rulers Tatra and Tarta plan to use it to make Cephiro into a colony.

As the Magic Knights help defend the castle, they each agree that the fate of the planet should not be the responsibility of only one person which, like Princess Emeraude, effectively prevents that person from ever being able to live and love freely. What's more, there is a mostly unspoken risk that when a new Pillar is chosen, something may eventually hinder them from praying solely for Cephiro's well-being, cause them to summon new Magic Knights to kill them, and bring Cephiro to near-destruction again until a new Pillar is chosen, causing the cycle of events to continue endlessly. As such, Lantis, a powerful magic swordsman and Zagato's younger brother, wishes to end the Pillar system for those reasons.

Eventually, Mokona narrows the candidates down to two: Hikaru and the sickly Eagle Vision of Autozam, who is friends with Lantis and, as such, wishes to end the Pillar system for him with his eternal sleep. As the two undergo the test to become the new Pillar in a recreation of Tokyo, Mokona reveals itself to be the creator of Cephiro and its laws, both of which it had created after sadly witnessing the violence and destructive nature of the people on its earlier creation, Earth. It was responsible for bringing the three girls back to Cephiro. In the end, Hikaru becomes the new Pillar of Cephiro, and brings Eagle Vision back to Cephiro from the Tokyo recreation with the help of Fuu and Umi, against Mokona's insistence that only one may return. Hikaru then rejects the Pillar system, decreeing once and for all the fate of the planet should not be the responsibility of one person. Mokona accepts their decision and leaves with the three Mashin. The manga concludes with the three girls' returning to a new Cephiro to visit their loved ones, as they work with the rulers of the other planets to solve their planets' problems, and contemplate Mokona's wish to allow the three protagonists to bring change to Cephiro.

== Development ==
During the celebration of the publication of the Soryuden novels, which Clamp had illustrated, the group was asked by Hideki Yamaguchi, editor for the Japanese shōjo (targeted towards girls) manga magazine Nakayoshi, to do a series for the magazine. The editor-in-chief wanted a story that could appeal to elementary readers and older, while Clamp wished to bring in younger fans. Without direction from the editors, the group decided on a series combining robots, as they were fond of robot anime; role-playing games (RPGs), which saw popularity in Japan at the time; and fantasy, to counterbalance the robots, which they thought alone would be off-putting to their target audience. According to Ohkawa, the magazine's success with the magical girl manga Sailor Moon (1991–97) made it possible for the group to pitch a serial with robots to its editors.

Rayearth intentionally traces out an RPG world, but I don't consider it an RPG world, myself. You can tell it's not a simple world, the kind where there's a princess, a villain who kidnaps her, and the main character who saves the day and lives happily ever after. Even if the main characters thought that's the world they got into ...

— writer Nanase Ohkawa

A friend of Clamp, illustrator Takeshi Okazaki, created the "Rayearth" part of the title, while Ohkawa thought of the rest. At that point, Clamp had completed a "basic" idea of the plot. For the names of the characters, they drew on car names, feeling that they would be interesting and memorable for children, who might otherwise have difficulty learning the names of characters in katakana. The inclusion of giant robots gave the artists some difficulty, as the massive scale of the robots made it impossible to depict the characters and robots in the same frame. The artists also omitted the cockpit of the robots, to show their faces instead. Greatly anticipating the ending to the first part of the series, Clamp found the protagonists' initial adventures in Cephiro "really easy" to create. Ohkawa noted that, had their target audience been older or male, they would have considered stopping the series with the conclusion of part one. The second part, however, proved difficult for the group to create, as they felt as if they had "written [them]selves into a corner".

Magic Knight Rayearth explores "fate, grim destiny, and sacrifice," as do many of Clamp's works. According to Ohkawa, who believes in choosing one's fate, humanity's fate is caused by one's actions; Cephiro is merely an exaggeration of Earth.

== Media ==
=== Manga ===
Written and illustrated by Clamp, Magic Knight Rayearth appeared as a serial in the Japanese magazine Nakayoshi from November 1993 to February 1995. Kodansha collected the chapters in three tankōbon volumes. The first was published on July 22, 1994; the last was released on March 6, 1995. The sequel also appeared in Nakayoshi from March 1995 to April 1996.

In 1997, Tokyopop licensed Magic Knight Rayearth for an English-language translation in North America, and serialized it in its manga magazine MixxZine. The English version of the manga was at first issued in a flipped left to right format, but was re-released in the original right to left format in later editions. The English version of the manga also at first continued the volume numbering through the two series, such that Magic Knight Rayearth II volumes #1–3 were numbered as volumes "#4–6" (i.e., the 2000/2001 release of Magic Knight Rayearth volume 4 has the same content as the 2003/2004 re-release's Magic Knight Rayearth II volume 1).

After Tokyopop lost their license for the series, as Dark Horse Comics announced at their San Diego Comic-Con 2009 panel that they would be publishing the series in a new omnibus edition in honor of Clamp's 20th anniversary. Dark Horse published the omnibus editions from July 6, 2011, to April 12, 2012.

After Dark Horse Comics' license expired, Kodansha Comics licensed it and released the series digitally and in two hardcover box sets containing three volumes each in honor of the manga's 25th anniversary from November 26, 2019, to December 29, 2020. At Anime NYC 2022, Kodansha USA announced that they would release a paperback edition, with the first volume released on December 12, 2023.

The series is also licensed in French by Pika Édition and in Spanish by Planeta DeAgostini and later by Norma Editorial.

==== Magic Knight Rayearth ====
No.	Original release date	Original ISBN	North American release date	North American ISBN
1	July 22, 1994	4-06-334642-0	January 1999; August 5, 2003 (unflipped re-release)	978-1-892213-00-6; 1-59182-082-0
2	November 22, 1994	4-06-334643-9	March 1999; October 14, 2003 (unflipped re-release)	978-1-892213-08-2; 1-59182-083-9
3	March 6, 1995	4-06-334644-7	September 1999; December 9, 2003 (unflipped re-release)	978-1-892213-16-7; 1-59182-084-7

==== Magic Knight Rayearth II ====
No.	Original release date	Original ISBN	North American release date	North American ISBN
1	July 26, 1995	4-06-334659-5	June 2000; February 10, 2004 (unflipped re-release)	978-1-892213-43-3; 1-59182-266-1
2	December 18, 1995	4-06-334660-9	March 2001; April 6, 2004 (unflipped re-release)	978-1-892213-52-5; 1-59182-267-X
3	April 23, 1996	4-06-334661-7	June 2001; June 8, 2004 (unflipped re-release)	978-1-892213-72-3; 1-59182-268-8

=== Anime ===
The anime series aired first on Yomiuri TV, Nippon Television and other NNS stations in Japan on October 17, 1994, and ended on November 27, 1995. It was directed by Toshihiro Hirano and co-produced by YTV and Tokyo Movie Shinsha (now TMS Entertainment). The anime had 2 seasons, lasting 49 episodes altogether.

The TV series was licensed in the U.S. twice, first by The Ocean Group, which was supposed to air on Fox Kids in a test pilot run in the 1990s, and second by Media Blasters and was dubbed by Bang Zoom! Entertainment from 1999 to 2000.

The anime series was also aired on the Philippine television network ABS-CBN in 1996, dubbed in Tagalog and airing every Sunday at 9:00 am for the first season and 10:30 am for the second season in 1997. It was popular with Filipino female children and became one of the Philippines' highest-rated anime series of the 20th century, helping to revitalize Filipino interest in anime. It was later aired on GMA Network on November 26, 2001, but on a weekday basis and with a Tagalog dub produced by Telesuccess Productions.

It was released on both VHS and DVD. Discotek Media re-released the series on DVD and Blu-ray on January 31, 2017. Anime Limited announced that they had acquired the series for release in the United Kingdom and Ireland, along with the 3 part OVA which was included only in a 2 part limited edition blu-ray set, the OVAs them selves where on a standard DVD.

A new anime project was announced to celebrate the 30th anniversary of the anime series on July 2, 2024. It was later confirmed to be a remake television series that will be produced and planned by TMS Entertainment, (Note: Under the "Unlimited Produce by TMS" label.) animated by E&H Production, and directed by Yui Miura, with Shigeru Murakoshi handling series composition, Satomi Watabe designing the characters, and Yuki Kajiura, Takumi Ozawa and Shiho Terada composing the music. It is set to premiere on October 7, 2026, on the IMAnimation W programming block on TV Asahi and its affiliates, and will run for two consecutive cours. The first opening theme song is "Otome no Tsurugi" (乙女の剣; 'A Young Lady's Sword'), performed by Toaka, and the first ending theme song is "Hoshiakari" (星灯; 'Starlight'), performed by Yurina Kawaguchi. Crunchyroll is streaming the series. Medialink licensed the series in East, South and Southeast Asia for streaming on the Ani-One Asia YouTube channel.

=== OVA ===
A three-part OVA was released in Japan a few years after the end of the manga and the TV series (July 25, September 26, and December 10, 1997). The OVA was named simply Rayearth, and its story was different from the original. The characters are all the same, but the relationships, places, and events of the story changed radically.

In the OVA, Hikaru, Umi and Fuu are friends who go to the same school and will soon be leaving for high school, with each of them distraught about the prospect of never seeing one another again after graduation. Suddenly, a strange fairy, Mokona, appears in front of them. At the same time, strange monsters and wizards start to appear in the city of Tokyo from another dimension. One of them is Clef, who guides the three girls to become Beast Spirit Tamers and awaken their Deities. They are then tasked to defend their homeworld from the evil wizards from Cephiro, who are trying to invade the human world in order to fulfill the wishes of their princess, Emeraude. The girls must each face and reconcile their personal flaws and defeat their trial counterparts, Alcyone, Ascot, and Ferio. They then learn that Emeraude's younger brother, Eagle, has been manipulating events behind the scenes: when the land of Cephiro fell into ruin, Eagle convinced the high priest Zagato to commit suicide as human sacrifice, and cast a spell on Emeraude, trapping her in a fantasy that Zagato is still alive. Meanwhile, he sacrificed the people of Cephiro and manipulated the invasion of Earth and the sorcerers of Cephiro into battle so that everything will be destroyed, according to his wishes. Zagato's brother Lantis opposes Eagle and acts as an ally to the Magic Knights. The Magic Knights draw upon their close bond and manage to free Emeraude. She awakens and inspired by the Magic Knights' hope and bravery, ends the invasion, forgiving Eagle, and takes them both back to their home dimension. The Earth is restored, with minor casualties and destruction, and the girls graduate and go on to their separate futures, though Mokona remains behind.

The OVA is licensed in the U.S. by Manga Entertainment, who opted to use a different New York-based voice cast for its English release, which was produced by Skypilot Entertainment.

=== Theme songs ===
Opening themes

Three opening themes were used in the series and one in the OVA Rayearth:

Magic Knight Rayearth:

- Episodes 1–20: "Unyielding Wish" (｢ゆずれない願い｣, "Yuzurenai Negai") by Naomi Tamura

Magic Knight Rayearth 2:

- Episodes 1–22: "I Can't Hate You" (｢キライになれない｣, "Kirai ni narenai") by Ayumi Nakamura (中村あゆみ, Nakamura Ayumi)
- Episodes 23–29: "Still Embracing Light and Darkness" (｢光と影を抱きしめたまま｣, "Hikari to Kage o Dakishimeta mama") by Naomi Tamura

Media Blasters' early English DVD release used "Still Embracing Light and Darkness" as the opening for Magic Knight Rayearth 2 episodes 1–22, due to licensing issues. The original openings from episodes 1–22 were included as an extra on the early DVDs, and was only in Japanese, however this isn't the case with the remastered sets, in which the dubbed openings were removed, meaning all three openings are left intact.

Ending themes

Three ending themes were used:

Magic Knight Rayearth:

- Episodes 1–20: "The Courage Leading to Tomorrow" (｢明日への勇気｣, "Asu e no Yūki") by Keiko Yoshinari (吉成 圭子, Yoshinari Keiko)

Magic Knight Rayearth 2:

- Episodes 1–22: "Lullaby - Let me embrace you tenderly -" (｢ら·ら·ば·い〜優しく抱かせて〜｣, "Lullaby ~ Yasashiku Dakasete") by Minako Honda (本田 美奈子, Honda Minako)
- Episodes 23–29: "It Will Shine Someday" (｢いつか輝く｣, "Itsuka Kagayaku") by Keiko Yoshinari

Media Blasters' early English DVD release used "Lullaby ~ Yasashiku Dakasete ~" as the ending for Magic Knight Rayearth 2 episodes 23–29, due to licensing issues. The original ending from episodes 23-29 was included as an extra on the early DVDs, and was only in Japanese, this again was eventually rectified in the remastered sets, in which, like the openings the dubbed endings were removed meaning all three endings were left intact.

In the early English releases of the TV series, Sandy Fox sang both the available opening and ending themes in the English dubbed version.

Rayearth:

- OVA: "All You Need Is Love" by Naomi Tamura

== Video games ==
A number of video games have been released based on Magic Knight Rayearth. Magic Knight Rayearth, an adventure role-playing game (RPG) set in the first TV season, was released for the Sega Saturn. It was the last officially released game for the console in the North America. All other games based on the manga are Japan-only releases, including a Super Famicom RPG, a Sega Pico game called Magic Knight Tanjou, two RPGs for Game Boy (the second one titled Magic Knight Rayearth 2nd: The Missing Colors), a raising sim, and another RPG for Game Gear.

The series appears in the Super Robot Wars T game, released in 2019, as well as 2021's Super Robot Wars 30.

== Reception ==
Magic Knight Rayearth has been well received by English-language readers. According to Dark Horse Comics, almost 200,000 copies of the series have been sold in the United States. The first volume of Tokyopop's re-release of Magic Knight Rayearth II placed 44th on the list of the top 100 bestselling graphic novels for February 2004, with an estimated 1,446 copies sold. The first volume of Dark Horse's omnibus edition appeared at the 83rd place of the list of the top 300 bestselling graphic novels for July 2011, with an estimated 1,069 copies sold. The second volume placed 109th on the list for April 2012, with an estimated 942 copies sold.
