= List of Magic Knight Rayearth characters =

The list of characters from the Magic Knight Rayearth anime and manga series by CLAMP. Many characters' names are either taken from or related to cars.

== The Magic Knights ==
=== Hikaru Shidou ===
Voiced by: Hekiru Shiina (1994 series), Ayane Sakura (2026 series) (Japanese); Julie Maddalena (1994 series), Venus Terzo (original), Tara Jayne (OVA), Rebecca Chiara Marano (2026 series) (English)

Hikaru Shidou (獅堂 光, Shidō Hikaru) is an eighth-grader with bright red eyes and scarlet hair (pink hair in the manga version and reboot version), who is small for her age and often teased for her boyishness. She helps her parents and her three older brothers (Masaru, Satoru and Kakeru) to run a school for Kendo. She is headstrong and determined, and in many ways very childish, but she is fiercely loyal to her friends. In particular, she wants to save Cephiro in the first arc in order to return home to her family and her dog, Hikari, her precious childhood friend. She uses fire-based spells, such as Arrow of Fire (Honoo no Ya) and Crimson Lightning. Her theme color is red.

Hikaru is very popular with fans, especially with boys, because of her sometimes childish behavior; for example, in the manga, where Fuu is "asking" Ferio to help them, Umi catches on to what she's doing, but Hikaru has no idea what's going on. When Ferio agrees, Umi cheers, as does Hikaru, though she still doesn't get it. It's also mentioned that she's the most popular girl in her all-girls school by her classmates in both adaptations.

She becomes best friends with Umi and Fuu in the first season. In the second season, she falls in love with Lantis, and becomes friends with Eagle Vision of Autozam. However, in the manga, Hikaru is only hinted at being romantically involved with Lantis, despite him hinting that he has strong feelings for her. Hikaru claims to love everyone, and due to her innocent nature, probably loves everyone equally. In the anime, Hikaru's affection for Lantis becomes much more apparent.

In the second season, when the need for a new Pillar of Cephiro is urgent, people from many different lands flock to Cephiro to become the Pillar. It is apparent from the first moment the girls are told they will be Magic Knights that Hikaru is the most strong-willed and passionate of the group; this leads to her eventually becoming the new Pillar at the end of the season. Hikaru decides that she would rather Cephiro not have to depend on one person's self-sacrifice, and uses her power as the Pillar to destroy the Pillar System and allow Cephiro to function on its own.

In some language adaptations, her name was changed to Lucy and Luce.

=== Umi Ryuuzaki ===
Voiced by: Konami Yoshida (1994 series), Rumi Okubo (2026 series) (Japanese); Wendee Lee (1994 series), Amy Birnbaum (OVA), Bryn Apprill (2026 series) (English)

Umi Ryuuzaki (龍咲 海, Ryūzaki Umi) is elegant with dark blue eyes and long, flowing azure blue hair (light blue hair in the manga version). She is an only child of rich parents, the two of which dote on her mercilessly and for whom she has great affection. A fencing champion, she is quick-tempered and at first uncaring (though perhaps the best-suited for the task at hand), as well as the most reluctant of the three Magic Knights: she is under great pressure to attend a fencing contest and is unsure of the land of Cephiro. Umi tends to go slightly ballistic at times, and provides a bit of comic relief during her fights with Mokona. Initially she seems to dislike Mokona, and even when she does become fond of him, occasionally still seems annoyed by his behavior. However, Umi is very dedicated to Hikaru and Fuu, wanting nothing more than to save Cephiro and return home. She uses water-based spells called Water Dragon and Azure Hurricane. Her theme color is blue.

In the anime Umi is totally clueless of Ascot's affections for her and she has feelings for Clef but he seems not to be too interested in love.

She's friends with Tatra and Tarta, the princesses of Chizeta, whom she defeated in sword fights at different points in the second season. During the same arc, Umi appears to be slightly more mature.

In the manga, she is apparently a fan of Häagen-Dazs ice cream, Denny's and MOS Burger (she becomes panicked at the thought that Cephiro does not have any of these – similar to Miaka Yūki in Fushigi Yûgi, who, upon hers and her best friend's arrival at another world, complains about the absence of her favourite restaurants). The brand names were removed from the anime dialogue, presumably to avoid copyright infringement.

Her lovestory in the manga is very different, she develops a very close relationship with Ascot who blushes whenever they are together. Although she doesn't realize Ascot's feelings she has a more proactive attitude with him offering and asking him for help on several occasions. They seem to have a special affinity and Mokona shows us that there is a connection between them. It is strongly implied that there is a budding relationship between Umi and Ascot near the end of the story. A relationship with Clef is non-existent in the manga.

Curiously, her parents have a minor cameo in Tsubasa: Reservoir Chronicle, another Clamp series that has many crossovers.

In some language adaptations, her name was changed to Marina and Marine.

=== Fuu Hououji ===
Voiced by: Hiroko Kasahara (1994 series), Rie Takahashi (2026 series) (Japanese); Bridget Hoffman (1994 series), Lisa Ortiz (OVA), Kelly Greenshield (2026 series) (English)

Fuu Hououji (鳳凰寺 風, Hōōji Fū) has snapping green eyes and short blonde hair (light brown in the anime) and wears glasses, except when in full armour (Fuu is notably the only Magic Knight whose hair and eyes do not share the same color base). She is more quiet and reserved than the other two members of the group and serves as the voice of reason. Along with specializing in archery, she is also highly intelligent and logical, though this is more akin to book-smarts than street-smarts. Fuu often states the obvious and is very blunt in a fairly humorous way, much to Umi's dismay in some situations. Fuu deeply believes that her belief, along with Hikaru's and Umi's, is her strength in saving Cephiro. She often has moments where she doubts herself, but comes out strong and resolved in the end. Her spells, Winds of Protection, Winds of Admonishment, and Winds of Healing, are air-based and are mostly healing and defensive in nature, though she has some offensive attacks, such as Emerald Typhoon and Emerald Cyclone. Her theme color is green.

Fuu is in love with Ferio, the estranged brother of Princess Émeraude, who has been helping them since they met in the beginning of the first series. In the second arc, she grows closer to Ferio, and though she is torn knowing she helped kill his sister, his feelings for her never waver. In the second season, Fuu wins an archery contest against Lady Aska, after which they become friends. Fuu is very polite and calls people Sir or Miss (-san in the Japanese version). Fuu also has an older sister named Kuu.

In some language adaptations, her name was changed to Anemone, Anaïs and Anne.

== Characters of the first part ==
=== Clef ===
Voiced by: Nozomu Sasaki (1994 series), Yuki Kaji (2026 series) (Japanese); Steve Staley (1994 series), Immy Uncle (OVA), Jacob Hopkins (2026 series) (English)

Clef (クレフ, Kurefu) is the chief of all sorcerers in Cephiro, and was formerly Princess Émeraude's attendant. In the anime, he is turned to stone by Zagato shortly after being introduced to the three girls in the first episode, although he fights the spell and communicated with them through Mokona. In the manga he is referred to as Guru Clef and is not turned to stone. In the second arc he also leads all of Cephiro until a new pillar can be found. In episode 48, he used all his willpower to create a castle to hold the castle from further collapsing.

In the manga and 2026 anime Clef is often seen with Presea, but nothing special is ever mentioned between them. In the anime he is both loved by Sierra and the deceased Presea. When he first meet the girls, he reacts very unpleasantly to Umi who called him a "child" or 10 years old as stated by Umi; when in fact, he is actually 745 years old.

In season 2 of the anime, it was hinted that he cares for Umi when she got abducted by the Twin Princess but he never showed a love interested for her.

His name is derived from the Autozam Clef (Mazda).

=== Mokona ===
Voiced by: Yuri Shiratori (1994 series), Mika Kikuchi (2026 series) (Japanese); Kaeko Sakamoto (1994 series), Carrie Savage (2026 series) (English)

Mokona (モコナ, Mokona) is a mischievous, nonsensical rabbit-like creature, possibly a Carbuncle, with a striking similarity to a white manjū bun, with a red gem in his forehead above his eyes. From this gem he can produce a tent for the girls to sleep in, food, and other necessary supplies. He is unable to speak, aside from repeating the sound "puu", although Hikaru seems to be somewhat able to understand him. In the manga, Mokona is revealed to be the Creator of the Earth, Cephiro and the other planets, as well as the laws for each planet. In the ending of the second arc, Mokona and the rest of the Mashin announce that they will be traveling to other dimensions.

Mokona of Rayearth is a separate character from Mokona Modoki from ×××HOLiC and Tsubasa -RESERVoir CHRoNiCLE-, though Yūko implies that those Mokonas were based on Cephiro's Mokona, and saying she might not have known about other worlds if she hadn't met him.

Mokona was named after Mokona, one of Clamp's artists.

=== Ferio ===
Voiced by: Takumi Yamazaki (1994 series), Yoshitsugu Matsuoka (2026 series) (Japanese); Terrence Stone (1994 series), Jim Ensz (OVA), Ry McKeand (2026 series) (English)

Ferio (フェリオ, Ferio) is a warrior whom the Magic Knights first meet in the Forest of Silence. A tough young man wielding a sword taller than he is, he quickly develops a soft spot for Fuu and the feelings grow to love near the end of the first arc but by the second season his feelings have evolved into a strong love for Fuu. Never completely honest with others, he made himself difficult for the heroines to trust.

In the anime he gives Fuu a jeweled orb. Since he has one identical to it, he uses it to communicate with her throughout the first series. In the manga series and 2026 anime series, he gives her a ring identical to the one on his ear. Fuu loses it when the three go home to Tokyo in the first series, but in the second series, when they return, he gives it to her for a second time. Both items were given to him by his older sister Princess Émeraude in his youth.

In the anime's first season, Ferio once pretended to join Ascot, Lord Zagato's child summoner, who set a trap for the Magic Knights using his sound-sensitive monster, Pajero. Also, while the Magic Knights are facing Innova's true form, Ferio regains his memory from his younger years. He realizes that he was Princess Émeraude's only brother, and hears his sister's voice coming from his own orb telling him how to defeat Innova. Ferio relays the info to the Knights and they manage to kill their enemy. In the manga Ferio knows of his origins and meets the Magic Knights on his way to try and save his sister, using his fighting skills in exchange for passage out of a forest he had become lost in.

In the OVA, he is initially a villain who can summon and control swarms of insects. He appears to have a close relationship with Ascot, and in a twist of his original character, he is the villain who does battle with Fuu. After eavesdropping on Lantis' conversation with Hikaru and the others, he assists Lantis in fighting Cephiro's spirits, and later delivers Lantis' sword to the combined Mashin to help them fight Eagle.

Ferio gets his name from the Honda Civic Ferio, and Ascot's monster from the episode featuring Ferio is named after the Mitsubishi Pajero.

=== Presea ===
Voiced by: Emi Shinohara (1994 series), Emiri Katō (2026 series) (Japanese); Mari Devon (1994 series), Morgan Lauré Garrett (2026 series) (English)

Presea (プレセア, Puresea) is the top blacksmith in Cephiro, known there as a Pharle or "artisan". She is one of Clef's students and seems to have a crush on him. She aided the Magic Knights by making their legendary swords from the mineral escudo.

In both the anime and manga series, she shows something of a sadistic side, plotting ways to punish Mokona for making a mess in her study (including yanking his ears, hanging him upside-down while she dances about him dressed as a Native American, and prying his ever-closed eyes wide open). Her trap captures the Magic Knights by mistake, so she ponders whether to stretch their cheeks or boil them in a big pot, again wearing a feathered headdress and doing a war dance. In the 1994 anime series, she is killed by one of Ascot's beast summons. This death happens only in the 1994 anime, and unfortunately created a plot hole for the second season when Presea becomes a necessary character in the manga counterpart.

In order to fill this plot hole, her twin sister, Sierra, is created to pose as her. The only ones to realize that Sierra is not Presea are Clef, Mokona, and Alcyone, who recognizes Sierra's deception as stemming partly from her love for Clef. When Clef confronts Sierra about why she is posing as her sister, Sierra replies that it is to help the Knights with their mission and continue her sister's legacy, but does not reveal her own feelings for him.

Presea's favorite food is listed as V-tek, a kind of candy from Cephiro (though she enjoys the candy from Earth that Hikaru gives her as payment for using her weapons).

Named after the Nissan Presea.

=== Alcyone ===
Voiced by: Yuri Amano (1994 series), Mamiko Noto (2026 series) (Japanese); Barbara Goodson (1994 series), Angora Deb (OVA), Erin Lundquist (2026 series) (English)

Alcyone (アルシオーネ, Arushiōne) (Alcione in Tokyopop translation) is an evil ice sorceress who tutored under Clef and was intended to attend to the Pillar. However, she fell in love with the high priest, Zagato, and for this love became his servant, although the affection is entirely one-sided. In the manga and 2026 anime she is killed after failing Zagato twice by his own hand. In the anime she lives on until near the end of the second season; moments after Zagato and Émeraude's deaths, she's captured by the evil witch Debonair, who brainwashes her into becoming her slave. Lantis captures Alcyone in battle, but she has lost her memories. When she recovers them, she reveals Debonair's plans for Cephiro and Debonair's location, and is killed shortly after by Debonair for her betrayal.

In the Sega Saturn game, Alcyone is apparently killed by Rafaga. She survives despite her injuries and, after realizing that Zagato loves Émeraude, Alcyone loses her sanity and dies fighting the Magic Knights one last time.

Her name comes from the Subaru Alcyone SVX.

=== Ascot ===
Voiced by: Minami Takayama (1994 series), Ayumu Murase (2026 series) (Japanese); Mona Marshall (1994 series), Sarah Roach (2026 series) (English)

Ascot (アスコット, Asukotto) One of the followers of Zagato, is a young child with the ability to summon monsters, whom he considers to be his friends. Although hideous, they have no ill will, but villagers still fear them. Homeless and without parents, Ascot was never well received anywhere with his monsters until Zagato offered to give him and his friends a home in exchange for serving under him. Consumed by hatred and loneliness, his heart is full of selfish feelings reflected in a poor image and attitude of evil and cruel child. His real age is unknown whether Ascot is really a child or not. It's possible that his physical appearance is produced by the poverty of his soul and the lack of affection.

In the anime he destroys Presea's house with his monsters, and essentially causes her death. Later, he confronts the Knights again but Umi slaps him for using his friends and causing them pain. This causes a change of heart in Ascot, he learns the true meaning of friendship and he then forsakes Zagato. In the second series, his appearance changes, now he is a tall and nice young man who has managed to grow thanks to the lessons learned in the past, the power of his will and the love he feels for Umi. Now his behavior is calm and sweet towards people. While he still summons monsters, he has learned other spells from Clef to avoid using his friends as living weapons. He is able to tell Umi his feelings before she leaves to fight Tarta & Tatra. Umi replies that she loves him as well, but just as much as everyone else in Cephiro, and that she didn't have any romantic feelings for him. This saddens Ascot a bit, but he still continues to try and win her heart.

In the manga and 2026 anime, his story is similar to the anime in the first season, he starts as an evil child who changes thanks to Umi's lessons, the only change is that he never kills Presea. In the second season, he becomes a tall young man as well for the same reasons described above. He decide to use his own magic instead of the "summoning magic" to avoid hurting his monsters and to learn how to fend for himself. Even though he never confesses his feelings to Umi, he gets Umi's affection much more than in the anime. They are closer and always smile when they are together, even Mokona reveals that there is a special connection between them. It is strongly implied that there is a budding relationship between Umi and Ascot near the end of the story so it is a more fortunate relationship than in the anime.

He is named after the Honda Ascot.

=== Caldina ===
Voiced by: Yūko Nagashima (1994 series), Hitomi Ueda (2026 anime) (Japanese); Lenore Zann (1994 series), Cassie Ewulu (2026 series) (English)

Caldina (カルディナ, Karudina) (Gardina in Tokyopop translation) is a dancer who speaks with an Osaka accent (which is translated as a deep Southern accent in the English dub, due to the translations including words like "y'all"), wears extremely skimpy clothing because her body is too sexy to be covered, and has an endless passion for money.

Zagato hires her as an assassin after his other minions fail; in addition to her dancing skills, she is an accomplished illusionist and hypnotist. In the anime she has great affection for Ascot, whom she treats as a naïve younger brother, and she joins him in deserting Zagato. It is revealed in the second arc and season that she is native to Chizeta. It's also been shown that Caldina is incredibly good at cards and other games of chance. Caldina hypnotizes people by making the red jewels on her gloves, earrings and shoes flash and send out bell sounds.

Romantically, Caldina becomes involved with Rafaga in all versions of the series.

Caldina also appears in Tsubasa: Reservoir Chronicle as a bartender. Her name comes from the Toyota Caldina.

=== Rafaga ===
Voiced by: Yukimasa Kishino (1994 series), Hiroki Yasumoto (2026 series) (Japanese); Bob Papenbrook (1994 series), Christopher Wehkamp (2026 series) (English)

Rafaga (ラファーガ, Rafāga) (Lafarga in Tokyopop translation) is the Captain of the Guard and charged with protecting the Pillar. Although Cephiro is mostly peaceful, he kept himself busy slaying the occasional monsters that would appear. In his takeover of the country, Zagato hypnotized him into trying to kill the Magic Knights as a last-ditch effort to stop them before they challenged him personally, but the girls managed to bring him to his senses. He goes against Zagato roughly at the same time Hikaru must meet Rayearth, and she in fact manages to summon her Mashin while trying to help Rafaga fight Zagato. In the second part of the story, he is romantically involved with Caldina. While he possesses no magical ability, he is a devastatingly powerful swordsman.

Named after the Honda Rafaga, a sister car of the Ascot.

=== Émeraude ===
Voiced by: Megumi Ogata (1994 series), Saori Hayami (2026 series) (Japanese); Wendee Lee (1994 series), Caitlin Glass (2026 series) (English)

Émeraude (エメロード, Emerōdo) is the current pillar (and princess) of Cephiro. Little else is revealed concerning her nature until the climax of the first series, although she is highly loved by her subjects.

In the anime it is revealed that she was once a noblewoman of Cephiro, and had later used her power as the Pillar to prevent her younger brother Ferio from being punished for stealing something from her. He had forgotten she was his sister because, at his own request, she had used her magic to help him forget about her so he would not miss her or feel sorrow, and asked that she in turn forget him, so that she could focus her thoughts and prayers only on Cephiro. In the manga series and 2026 anime series, she is Ferio's older sister as well, but there is no mention of Ferio stealing something from her, and he does remember that she is his sister; in fact, he left the palace on his own will.

The Pillar of Cephiro must spend every waking moment of their existence praying for Cephiro's benefit, and when Princess Émeraude fell in love with Zagato the High Priest, she was constantly thinking of him and not Cephiro, and eventually imprisoned herself in a water dungeon (resembling a large peony in an underwater cavern beneath Zagato's court in her own palace) in hopes of being able to focus on only Cephiro. When she is unable to do so, she summons the Magic Knights. Zagato, who had in turn fallen in love with her, discovered Princess Émeraude's true feelings for him and visits her often, telling her that he does not care for the fate of Cephiro, and that there was only one thing in the world that he cared about – Émeraude herself. Believing if he destroyed the Magic Knights, he would be able to keep Émeraude safe and that by sheer will everything would turn out all right, he sent his minions one by one, each one failing to carry out the task.

When the Magic Knights awaken the Rune Gods and arrive at the palace, Zagato is waiting for them. He confronts them in a Rune God he created with his own will to kill them and protect Émeraude, intent on making his one desire come true. But the Magic Knights emerge triumphant and kill Zagato. Émeraude, devastated by the loss of her beloved, collapses under the tremendous weight of her own guilt and grief. Transforming into an older- and more sinister-looking version of herself, she breaks free from the water prison. This form is only filled with anger and pure hatred for the Magic Knights for killing Zagato, forgetting it was she who summoned them in the first place.

Zagato's court begins to fall apart beneath her anger, and she dons her own Mashin and grabs Zagato's fallen sword. She begins to fight the Magic Knights in their Mashin, and they see fleeting visions of the real Émeraude who tells them of her plight and how she has realized that it would be better if she died than tried to rule Cephiro with a heart tainted with grief and regret. No one of Cephiro is allowed to kill the Pillar and the Pillar cannot will itself to die, so the "girls from another world" (the Magic Knights) are there solely for that purpose: to don the Mashin and kill the current Pillar of Cephiro, as death is the only way for the Pillar to abandon their duty.

The Knights resist at first, but tearfully give in when Émeraude begs them to send her to "where she may think only of Zagato" and be with him. Émeraude dies, using the last of her power to send them home to the exact moment they disappeared from Tokyo Tower. The last image of her they see is her purified adult self in Zagato's arms, smiling sweetly and thanking the Knights for granting her last wish.

It has been speculated that Princess Émeraude was based on The Childlike Empress from Michael Ende's The Neverending Story (Die unendliche Geschichte), being as they are both directly linked to their kingdom (if one should die, so shall their empire), they both do not play a direct role despite the fact that their powers are the most revered, and they are both depicted as young women, no older than the age of ten to thirteen. Furthermore, though they are both young in appearance, they are both considered "ageless". Lastly, their stories, though different in ways, are also similar. Recalling the fact that Émeraude sent for earthlings to kill her (for no one in Cephiro could do her harm), The Childlike Empress sent for a human boy, for no one in her kingdom of Fantasia could give her a new name. Also the Proof of the Pillar which took the form of Émeraude's tiara could also be related to The Childlike Empress' AURYN, which was the symbol of her absolute power in Fantasia.

Sometimes known as Princess Esmerald or Esmeralda, and misnamed Princess Emerald in the official English translation of the Tsubasa: Reservoir Chronicle manga. She gets her name from the Mitsubishi Émeraude.

=== Zagato ===
Voiced by: Jūrōta Kosugi (1994 series), Yūki Ono (2026 series) (Japanese); Lex Lang (1994 series), Bradley Gareth (2026 series) (English)

Zagato (ザガート, Zagāto) is the primary antagonist of the first part, his younger brother is Cail Lantis (introduced in the second arc and season). When he is first introduced, he is seen as a terrible villain who has kidnapped the beloved Princess Émeraude, watching cruelly as Cephiro crumbles without its Pillar. However, this image is far from the truth.

High Priest to Princess Émeraude and Clef's right-hand man, Zagato fell deeply in love with the beautiful and kind Princess. Despite her best efforts to put Cephiro first and foremost, Princess Émeraude fell in love with Zagato as well. When Émeraude goes missing, Zagato came forth as having had kidnapped Princess Émeraude. In reality, Émeraude was so upset by her lack of will that she imprisoned herself in the water dungeon to avoid seeing Zagato. Zagato does not reveal this to the Magic Knights or Cephiro's people, aiming to destroy the knights when they come after him.

The reason Zagato is this way is because of his deep love for Émeraude and equally deep hate for Cephiro's Pillar System. The Pillar must devote every moment of their existence to praying for Cephiro and never seek happiness from anything except seeing the planet prosper. Zagato was tormented to see Émeraude chained down as such and even more so when she had to resist the love that had grown between them. He decides that instead of Émeraude returning as the Pillar and continuing to be a slave to Cephiro, he would rather have Cephiro cease to exist.

In the end of the first part, he is killed in battle by the Magic Knights while desperately trying to protect Émeraude; his last words tell her to "be free". His death causes Émeraude to become lost in her own grief and rage before attacking the Magic Knights, who kill her in self-defense.

He is named after Italian automotive design studio Zagato.

=== The Three Mashin ===
Voiced by: Hideyuki Tanaka (1994 series, Rayearth), Tesshō Genda (1994 series, Selece), Akio Ōtsuka (1994 series, Windam), Kōji Yusa (2026 series, Selece), Hikaru Midorikawa (2026 series, Windam) (Japanese); Lex Lang (1994 series, Rayearth and Windam), Terrence Stone (1994 series, Selece) (English)

The three Mashin (Rune Gods in Tokyopop translation) are the legendary guardians of Cephiro. Umi's is Selece (as transliterated in the original manga artwork by CLAMP - also known as Ceres, Seles, or Celes in some translated versions), who first appears as a large blue dragon. Fuu's is Windam (Windom in the official English release of the manga), a great four-winged bird. Finally, Hikaru's is Rayearth (Lexus in the OVA series), a wolf with a mane of fire. The three are old and ancient, and are in fact mecha used by the Magic Knights to help them combat Zagato and ultimately kill the Pillar.

The three Mashin are able to combine into a greater and much stronger Mashin (unnamed by the authors, but sometimes named by the fanbase as "Combined Rayearth" or "Big Rayearth"). In the OVA, the combined mashin is named Rayearth. The "Rune God" name was only used in the official English release of the anime series. "Mashin" has a bit of a double-meaning; it is katakana for the English word "machine", but is a homonym of the Japanese word for "evil spirit", "magical spirit", or "demon god". They also feature as "Kudan" (a kind of protective spirit) in Tsubasa: Reservoir Chronicle, also by Clamp. Rayearth is assigned to Syaoran, Celes to Kurogane and Windam to Fay.

In the ending of the second and final part of the series, Mokona and the rest of the Mashin declare that they will be travelling to other universes.

== Characters of the second part ==
=== Lantis ===
Voiced by: Jūrōta Kosugi (1994 series) (Japanese); Lex Lang (1994 series), Dan Stevens (OVA) (English)

Lantis (ランティス, Rantisu), Zagato's younger brother, is a powerful Cail or Kailu (magic swordsman) who journeyed abroad for a great deal of time and returned to Cephiro after meeting Eagle in Autozam. Lantis has made his first appearance in season two when he returned to Cephiro. He desired to remove the Pillar System in order to prevent the tragedy and pain that Zagato and Princess Émeraude had experienced. He is regarded with suspicion due to his reclusive nature. Nevertheless, Hikaru approaches him, though at first it's because she feels extreme guilt about killing his brother. Though his intimidating manner can be off-putting, he is gentle at heart; in fact, he forgives Hikaru and the other Knights for Zagato's death.

In the anime version he falls in love with Hikaru, which she reciprocates, while in the manga there are only hints of any romance between the two. At the end of the manga, Lantis asks Hikaru how people of Earth convey love. When she explains that they usually marry, Lantis asks if there is anyone she'd like to marry, to which Hikaru replies that she'd like to marry everyone as she loves them all.

Lantis also appears in Tsubasa. His name comes from the Mazda Lantis.

In Super Robot Wars games, he has a Mashin which is a mirrored version of Zagato's.

=== Primera ===
Voiced by: Yuri Shiratori (1994 series) (Japanese); Rebecca Forstadt (1994 series) (English)

Primera (プリメーラ, Purimera) is a fairy who has acted as Lantis's guardian ever since he saved her from a monster attack. She's very jealous and possessive of Lantis, and thus harbors a deep dislike for Hikaru. From the start, Mokona likes to tease Primera, causing her to greatly dislike Mokona. When Hikaru and Lantis start to become friendly with each other, she pops up to stop them out of jealousy, but Mokona either chases her away or eats her and later spits her out. She can use low-level healing magic when necessary.

Primera makes an appearance in Tsubasa in the Hanshin Republic and is later mentioned in the country of Piffle, by Shogo Asagi. Rather than being tiny, she is the size of a normal human. She is named after the Nissan Primera.

=== Eagle Vision ===
Voiced by: Megumi Ogata (1994 series) (Japanese); Jerry Gelb (1994 series), Adam Masterelli (OVA) (English)

Eagle Vision (イーグル・ビジョン, Īguru Bijon) is a main antagonist of the second part in manga and 2026 anime and a well-known and respected commander from Cephiro's neighboring country, Autozam, a technologically advanced world reliant on the mental energy of its citizens for its power. It is clear right away that Eagle is an enigmatic and forceful tactician, and though a gentle and chivalrous gentleman, he is the leader of Autozam's invasion of Cephiro. He is also the son of the President of Autozam. When Lantis visited Autozam during his travels, he and Eagle became best friends.

Eagle comes to Cephiro with hopes of duplicating the Pillar System back on his home world, and also wishes to actually become the Pillar for personal reasons. Eagle is in fact very sick and wasn't even supposed to be alive by the time he made it to Cephiro. Eagle reveals to Hikaru that he wants to become the Pillar to spare Lantis' life and be in an eternal sleep with Cephiro.

In the end, Hikaru tells him it is unfair of him to leave all his loved ones behind and saves him, bringing him back to Cephiro and starting him on the road to restoring his health. In the anime, however, Eagle sacrifices himself in order to save the Magic Knights. It is unknown what happened to Autozam after his death, but in manga, Autozam becomes an allied country of Cephiro.

In the OVA he is Émeraude's brother and does his best to keep his sister happy. This includes trying to destroy the Earth because he's certain that's what his sister wants.

Eagle also appears in Tsubasa alongside comrades Lantis and Geo. He is named after the Chrysler Eagle Vision, and the FTO (mecha he pilots) is named after the Mitsubishi FTO. Autozam is named after a line of Mazda cars, Autozam.

=== Geo Metro ===
Voiced by: Kiyoyuki Yanada (1994 series) (Japanese); Doug Stone (1994 series) (English)

Geo Metro (ジェオ・メトロ, Jeo Metoro) is the second-in-command of the Autozam invasion of Cephiro. Muscular and good-natured, loyal and over-protective, he acts much like an older brother to Eagle Vision and has a weakness for sweets. He is featured with Eagle in Tsubasa.

Named after the Geo Metro. His mecha, the GTO, is named after the Mitsubishi GTO.

=== Zaz Torque ===
Voiced by: Jun'ichi Kanemaru (1994 series) (Japanese); Brianne Siddall (1994 series) (English)

Zaz Torque (ザズ・トルク, Zazu Toruku) is the mechanic of Eagle's forces and is quite short for a teenager. He wishes to have a girlfriend and he is fascinated with all kinds of machinery. As a mechanic, he can fix anything from microwaves to mechas. He likes to drink alcohol and also has a strong taste for sweets. Zaz is friends with Geo, Eagle and Lantis.

Zaz shares his name with Ukrainian car manufacturer ZAZ. He is often portrayed as having a crush on Hikaru.

=== Lady Aska of Fahren ===
Voiced by: Chinami Nishimura (1994 series) (Japanese); Sandy Fox (1994 series) (English)

Lady Aska (阿洲花, Asuka) is the First Princess of the country of Fahren and the head of the Fahren invasion force that attacks Cephiro. Her ship is the Dome, an immense dragon-shaped vessel. She laughs constantly and arrogantly, and tends to refer to herself as "we" instead of "I". She is very young, self-assured and appears fairly bratty (she wants Cephiro so her every whim will become reality, and in the anime version she wants to become pretty to impress Sanyun), but can use all the legendary forbidden spells of the Royal Family, including the ability to conjure up creatures that she draws on ceremonial paper that she uses to attack with.

In the anime series, Aska looks up to Fuu as a sort of heroine; this relationship is non-existent in the manga, as Fuu doesn't spend time on their ship. Aska later decides not to rule Cephiro because Fuu (Eagle in the manga) told her that the Pillar can think only of Cephiro, but since Lady Aska loves the people of Fahren, she cannot complete the task of Pillar in Cephiro. She gave this same reasoning when she decided to concede invading Cephiro in the manga. Her face looks like that of Meiling Li of Cardcaptor Sakura.

Named after the Isuzu Aska. Fahren also happens to mean "driving" in German.

=== Sanyun ===
Voiced by: Satomi Kōrogi (1994 series) (Japanese); Barbara Goodson (1994 series) (English)

Sanyun (山伊, San'yun) is Aska's loyal servant and childhood friend. He's much more thoughtful and studious than Aska (though he really doesn't look it) and hopes to one day assist her in ruling Fahren.

In the manga, there are slight implications of a relationship between Aska and Sanyun.

He makes a short appearance in Tsubasa: Reservoir Chronicle as the Kudan of Masayoshi Saitou, and again in this form in the Country of Ōto, working for Chang Ang in a sword shop.

He shares his name with South Korean car manufacturer Ssang Yong.

=== Chang Ang ===
Voiced by: Kōhei Miyauchi (1994 series, episodes 26-31), Takkō Ishimori (1994 series, episode 31+) (Japanese); Richard Barnes (1994 series) (English)

Chang Ang (長庵, Chan'an) is a Fahren cabinet member and current ruler of the realm until Aska comes of age. He puts a lot of pressure on Aska to become a good ruler, which causes her to think of him as a "preachy old man"; in the English version, a "bigmouth". In the manga Chang Ang assists Lady Aska in her invasion of Cephiro. Throughout the second story arc, he constantly loses his temper with her because of her rash actions and silly decisions.

Chang Ang also makes an appearance in Tsubasa in the Country of Ōto.

He shares his name with the Chinese car manufacturer Changan Automobile.

=== Tata ===
Voiced by: Aya Hisakawa (1994 series) (Japanese); Melissa Fahn (1994 series) (English)

Tata (タータ, Tāta) is the hot-headed princess of the planet Chizeta, which sends its forces to conquer Cephiro and expand its territory. She is especially good at sword combat and can summon the djinn Rakoon. She wants to rule Cephiro as the Pillar to give a better life quality to the people of Chizeta, since their planet is too small.

In the anime, she has a friendly rivalry with Umi; when each of the Magic Knights are taken to one of the invading countries, she and her sister face Umi aboard their battleship.

Tata shares her name with Indian car manufacturer Tata Motors.

=== Tatra ===
Voiced by: Kikuko Inoue (1994 series) (Japanese); Melissa Fahn (1994 series) (English)

Tatra (タトラ, Tatora) is Tarta's calm and seemingly airheaded older twin sister who, when focused, is in fact a formidable warrior. She can conjure the djinn Rasheen to do her bidding and go into battle for her, or choose to use a whip against her enemies. According to Tarta, Tatra is in fact the best fighter in Chizeta.

Tatra shares her name with Czech truck manufacturer Tatra.

== 1994 anime-only characters ==
=== Innova ===
Innova (イノーバ, Inōba) is an anime-and-game-only character sporting an elven appearance and manner. He was a devoted servant of Zagato's—in fact, a birthday present from Émeraude to her High Priest. Innova is not humanoid as he appears, but an animal-shaped elemental of lightning who assumed a human form to better serve his new master. His true form resembles a giant wolf with two tendrils streaming from his back. His weak spot proved to be the gemstone embedded in his forehead in either form. He first challenged the Magic Knights in the Sky Shrine, and would have defeated them if not for Windam's revival. He later resumed his true form and was destroyed by Hikaru.

In the Spanish version of the anime he's known as Nova, which is also the name of Hikaru's darker half in the original source material. His name comes from the Honda Ascot Innova.

Voiced by: Ryōtarō Okiayu (Japanese); Terrence Stone (English)

=== Sierra ===
Sierra (シエラ, Shiera) is an anime-only character. She is Presea's identical twin sister, and the only way to tell them apart is by the feather-shaped birthmark on Sierra's chest (first noted by Caldina when all the girls are bathing together). She makes her appearance throughout the anime's second season, corresponding with Presea's presence in the manga. Sierra pretends to be Presea to alleviate a portion of the pain of the Magic Knights, who blame themselves for not being able to help Presea, and of Ascot, who blames himself for killing Presea. Clef falsely tells the Magic Knights that Princess Émeraude made a wish to revive all the people who died while she was imprisoned, though in truth no one can revive a life once it is lost.

Sierra is in love with Clef, as was Presea, though her love is one-sided (Alcyone confirms this after learning of Sierra's true identity). She cannot make weapons out of Escudo, but she can help revive the weapons once they are lost; she did this to help Hikaru regain her sword after Nova broke it.

She is named after the Ford Sierra.

Voiced by: Emi Shinohara (Japanese); Mari Devon (English)

=== Nova ===
Nova (ノヴァ, Nova) is introduced as the daughter of Lady Debonair and is an anime-only villainess, able to use Hikaru's attacks as her own while using the Mashin Regalia. She is rather slender with pink hair and elf ears, and appears to be close in age to the three heroines. Throughout the series, Nova gives the impression of being an unstable character, often switching between expressing affection and giving death threats in the space of a heartbeat. Most of her schemes involve capturing Hikaru, whom she obsessively loves enough to kill while expressing disdain towards those Hikaru cares for.

Nova is eventually revealed to be a fragment of Hikaru's soul that broke off from Hikaru's inability to cope with killing Émeraude and became a separate being, unknowingly left behind on Cephiro. While Nova searched for Hikaru, she was instead found by Debonair and is manipulated into her service. But once Nova learned the truth that Debonair only used her, she loses against Hikaru and willingly merged back into her after Hikaru admitted that Nova's creation might have been her subconscious attempt to overcome her self-loathing over Émeraude's death.

As a character, Nova was created by Toshihiro Hirano. She was originally one of his characters from a different anime that was never realized and produced. She is named after the Chevrolet Nova.

Voiced by: Miki Itō (Japanese); Dorothy Elias-Fahn (English)

=== Debonair ===
Debonair (デボネア, Debonea), an anime-only character, is the head antagonist of the second season who awaits the day when Cephiro will crumble due to lack of support from Princess Émeraude. Debonair is ultimately revealed to be an embodiment of the collective darkness within the hearts of Cephiro's citizens, thus possessing tremendous power with a desire to rule over Cephiro. She is not present in the manga, which instead focuses on the battles between Cephiro and the three invading countries of Autozam, Fahren, and Chizeta.

She gets her name from the Mitsubishi Debonair. An alternate version of her appears in Tsubasa as the Kiishim.

Voiced by: Atsuko Takahata (Japanese); Melodee Spevack (English)
