= Toyota Caldina =

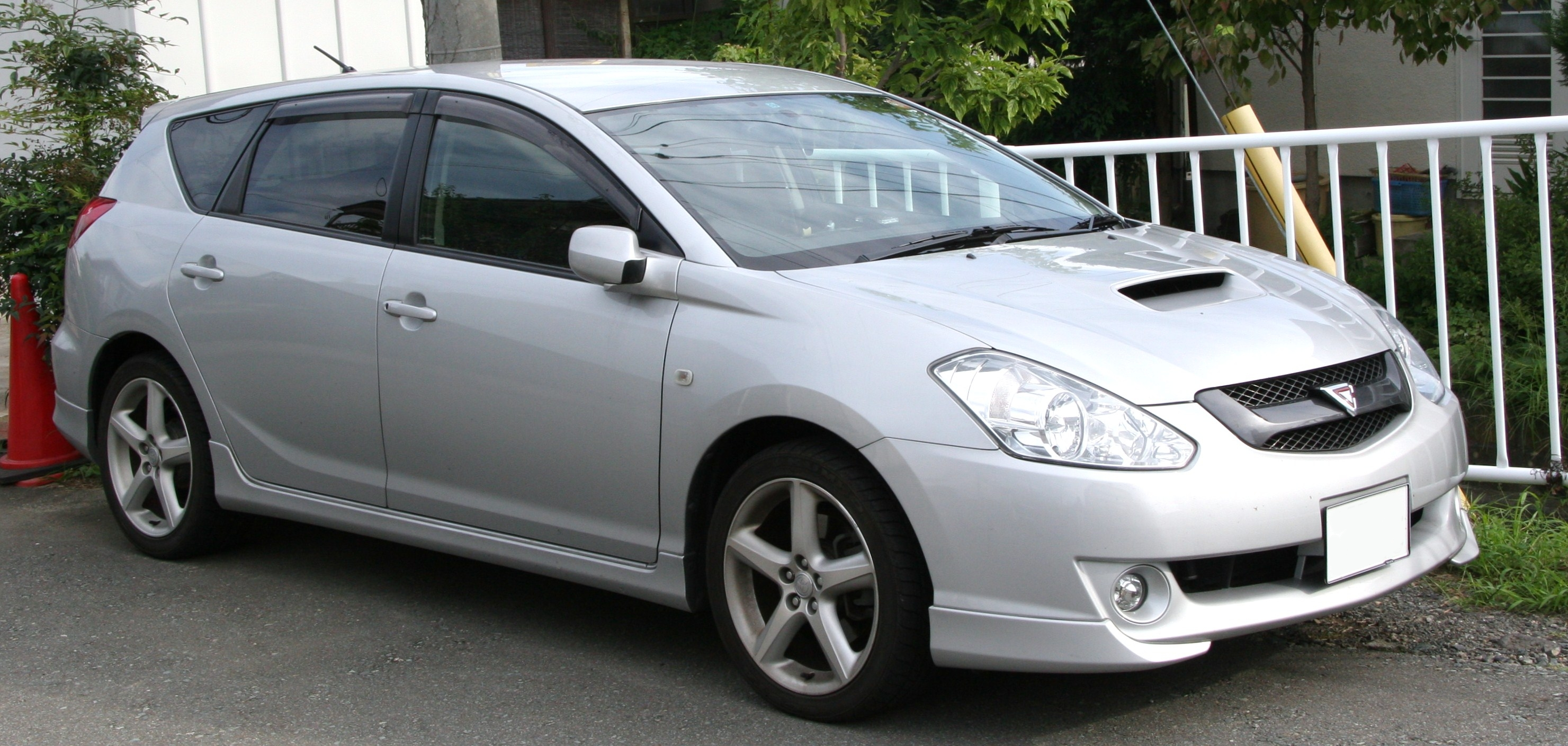
- 2002-2004 Toyota Caldina GT-Four (ST246, Japan)

Overview
- Manufacturer: Toyota
- Production: November 1992 – June 2007

Body and chassis
- Class: Compact car
- Layout: Front-engine, front-wheel-drive; Front-engine, four-wheel-drive

Chronology
- Predecessor: Toyota Corona wagon/van (T170); Toyota Carina Surf/van (T170)
- Successor: Toyota Avensis wagon (T270)

The Toyota Caldina (Japanese: トヨタ・カルディナ, Toyota Karudina) is an automobile manufactured by Toyota for the Japanese market from 1992 to 2007. It replaced the Corona and Carina wagons, and was sold at Toyota Store and Toyopet Store locations in Japan. While cars bearing the Caldina nameplate have never been officially exported by Toyota, its available 4WD capability and large capacity have made it a popular grey import in Australia, New Zealand, Russia and many South American countries. When it was discontinued in 2007, the T270 series Avensis wagon/estate assumed its market position.

According to Toyota, the name "Caldina" is inspired by the Italian (and English) adjective "cardinal", meaning "essential" or "fundamental".

== First generation (T190; 1992) ==
First generation
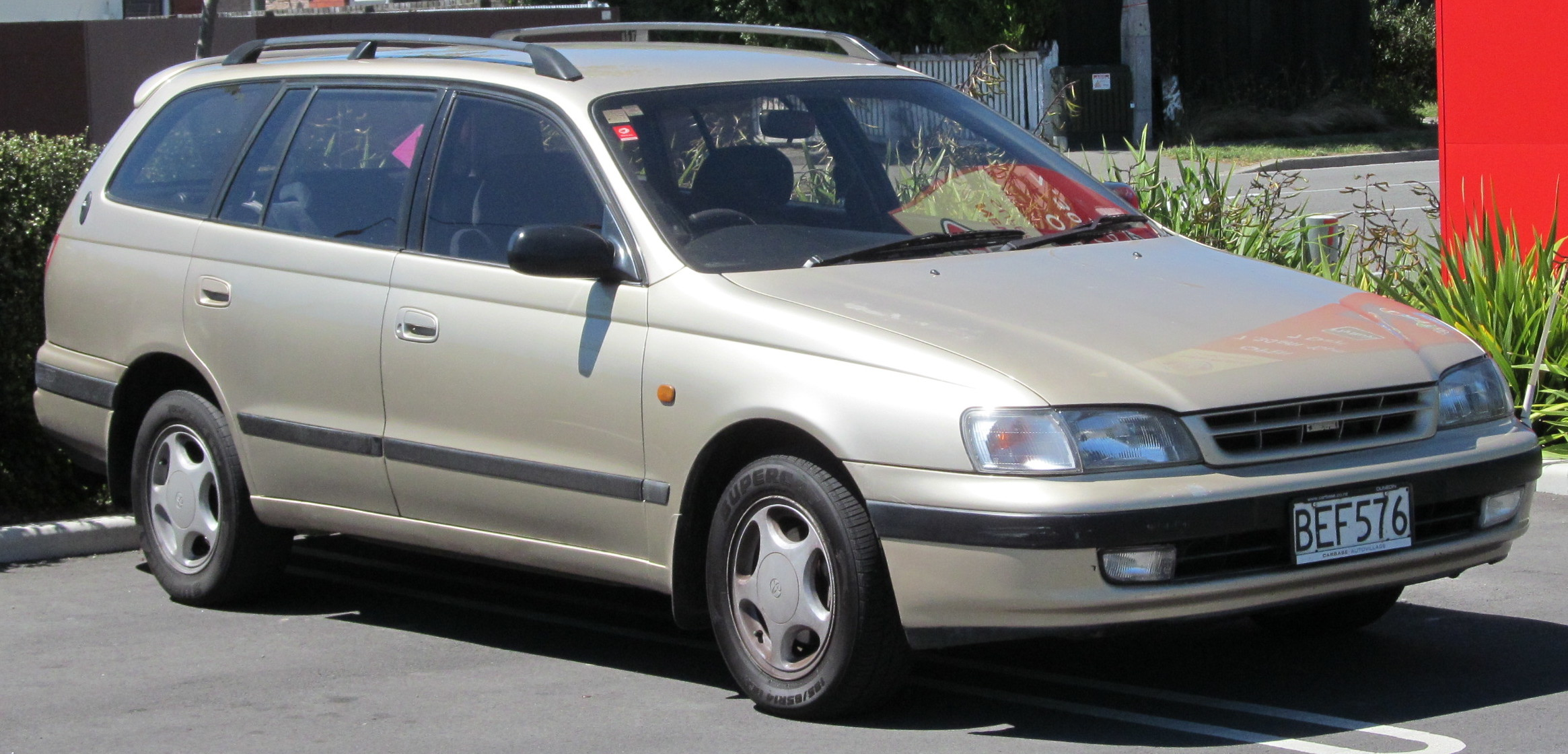
- Pre-facelift Toyota Caldina 2.0 TZ (ST191G)

Overview
- Model code: T190
- Also called: Toyota Corona/Carina E (T190)
- Production: November 1992 – August 1997 (wagon); November 1992 – July 2002 (van)
- Assembly: Japan: Toyota City, Aichi (Tsutsumi plant)

Body and chassis
- Body style: 5-door station wagon/van

Powertrain
- Engine: Petrol: 1.5 L 5E-FE I4 (ET196V); 1.6 L 4A-FE I4 (AT190); 1.8 L 7A-FE I4 (AT191); 1.8 L 4S-FE I4 (ST190); 2.0 L 3S-FE I4 (ST191/195/198V); 2.0 L 3S-GE I4 (ST195); Diesel: 2.0 L 2C I4 (CT190/196V/198V); 2.0 L 2C-T turbo I4 (CT190); 2.2 L 3C-E I4 (CT197V/199V)
- Transmission: 5-speed manual; 3-speed automatic (5E-FE); 4-speed automatic

Dimensions
- Wheelbase: 2,580 mm (101.6 in)
- Length: 4,545 mm (178.9 in)
- Width: 1,695 mm (66.7 in)
- Height: 1,450–1,555 mm (57.1–61.2 in)

Chronology
- Successor: Toyota Succeed (van)

The first-generation Caldina is a 5-door wagon and commercial van version of the Corona/Carina sedan in Japan. It became treated as a separate line, with a new emphasis on the passenger-oriented station wagon model as a response to the runaway success of the Subaru Legacy wagon in Japan. The Caldina was introduced in November 1992 and built until 2002. The wagon has independent strut rear suspension while the commercial wagon has semi-independent leaf springs. Van models' chassis numbers are in the 196-199 range and receive a "V" suffix, while the wagons are 190-195 and carry a "G" suffix.

In January 1996, the Caldina underwent a subtle facelift, including a new dashboard, a new grille, and a redesigned bootlid with redesigned taillights. The new dashboard was the same design as the one installed in the simultaneously introduced Corona Premio (T210), enabling the fitment of a passenger airbag. At this time, the 1.8-litre engine was also changed over from the 4S to the lean-burn 7A engine. The 2-litre 3S-FE engine produces 140 PS (103 kW), 135 PS (99 kW) when coupled with four-wheel drive. Arriving in February 1995, the more powerful, wide-angle 3S-GE in the TZ-G was only available with 4WD and produces 175 PS (129 kW), ten horsepower less when fitted with the automatic transmission.

Special versions of the Caldina Wagon included the Sky Canopy, introduced in February 1993. This version had a taller, partially glazed roof although it offered no additional space inside. It also could not accommodate most roof racks and by the time of the January 1996 facelift it was replaced with the Aerial, which has a taller roof to accommodate a 60 cm (24 in) long, sliding sunroof. The Aerial also received different headlights, with black "masks" between the reflectors, and clearer taillights with a more distinct, faceted pattern. The Aerial's head- and taillights were later installed on a number of run-out special editions including the Limited, Lanner, and Excellent Package. The later Field Hunter cashed in on Japan's so-called "RV boom" - versions of station wagons and small vans with offroad pretensions. The Field Hunter received an externally mounted spare wheel, which increased the overall length to the point that it was no longer classified as a "compact car", placing it in a much higher tax category. The popularity of light, passenger-based commercial vehicles was waning at this time in Japan; the Mark II Van (X70) was discontinued without a direct successor in 1997, leaving only the Crown and Caldina Vans. While sales of the Caldina Wagon ended in September 1997, the Van variants continued to be sold until July 2002.

The Caldina Van received another light facelift in August 1999, which is also when the naturally aspirated diesel was upgraded to a 2.2-litre version (the turbo-diesel was only ever available in the Caldina Wagon). ABS brakes were made standard, while crash protection was improved. The 2-litre 3S-FE gasoline engine also became available in the Caldina Van, only in combination with the electronically controlled four-speed automatic transmission (ECT) and four-wheel drive.

In Europe, the wagon was part of the Carina E family, while in New Zealand it was sold with Corona badging. The vans were generally not exported. The 1.6-litre 4A engine (AT190) was only installed in export versions; these also typically kept the pre-facelift tailgate since the redesigned type was not able to accommodate the wider, European license plates.

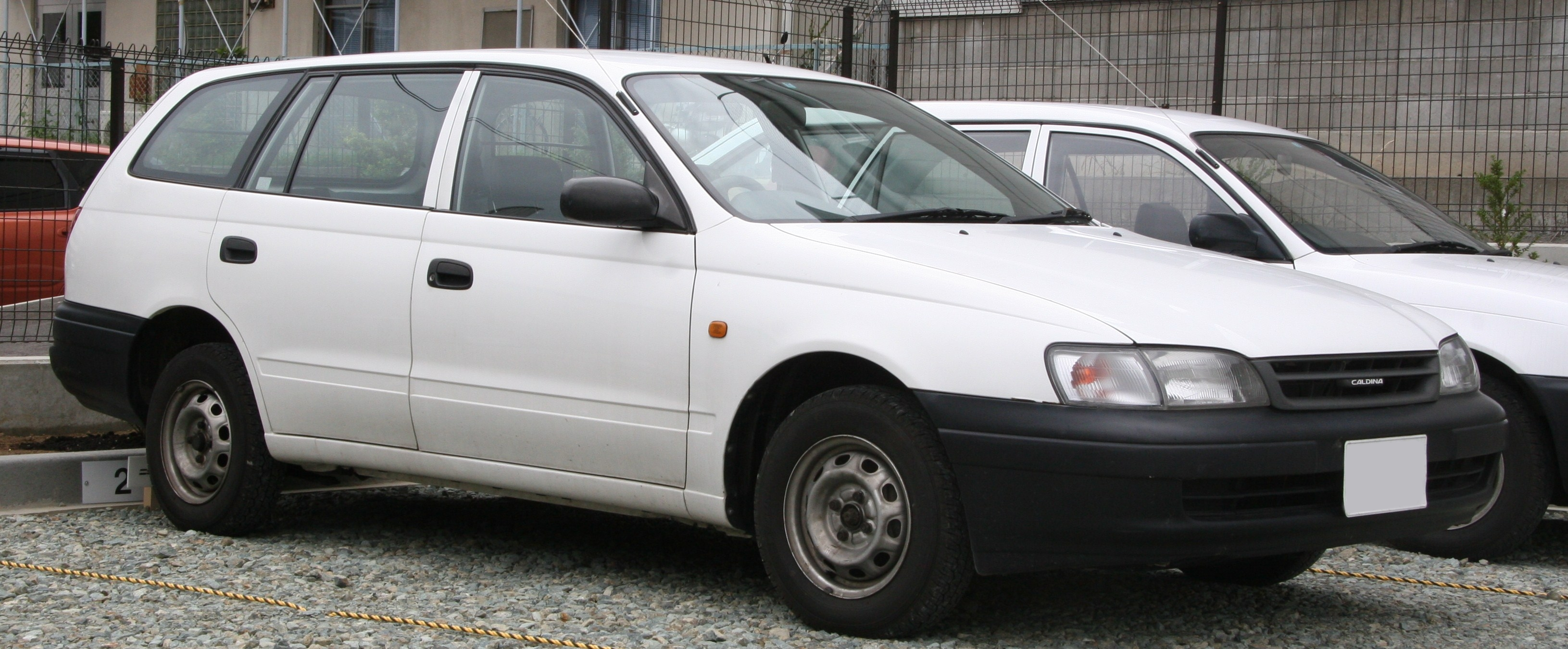
Caldina Van

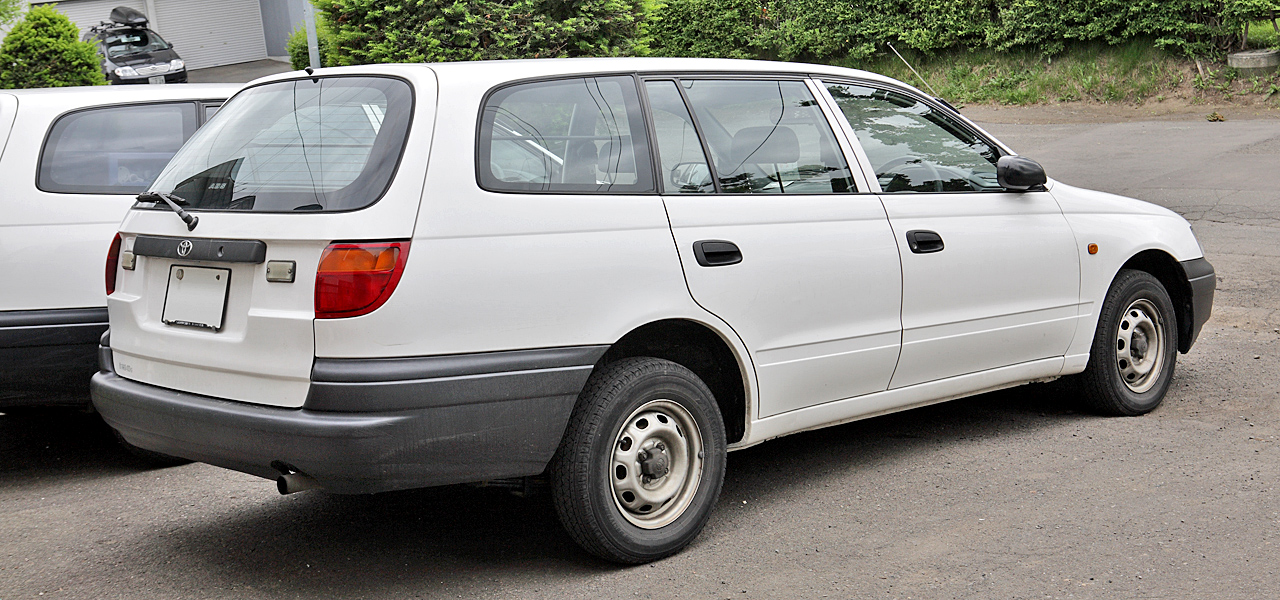
Caldina Van

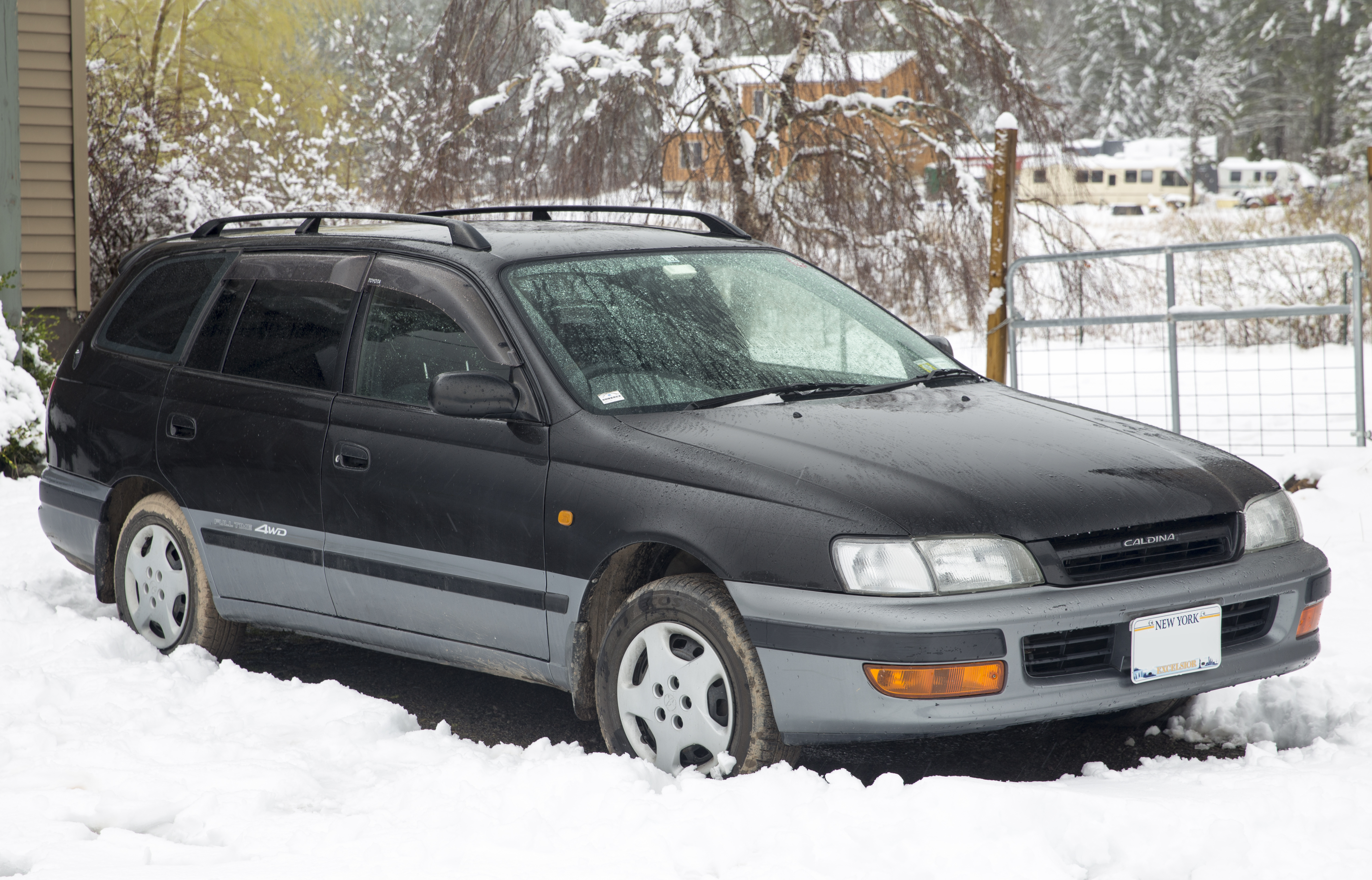
Caldina 2.0 TZ 4WD (ST195G; facelift, Japan)

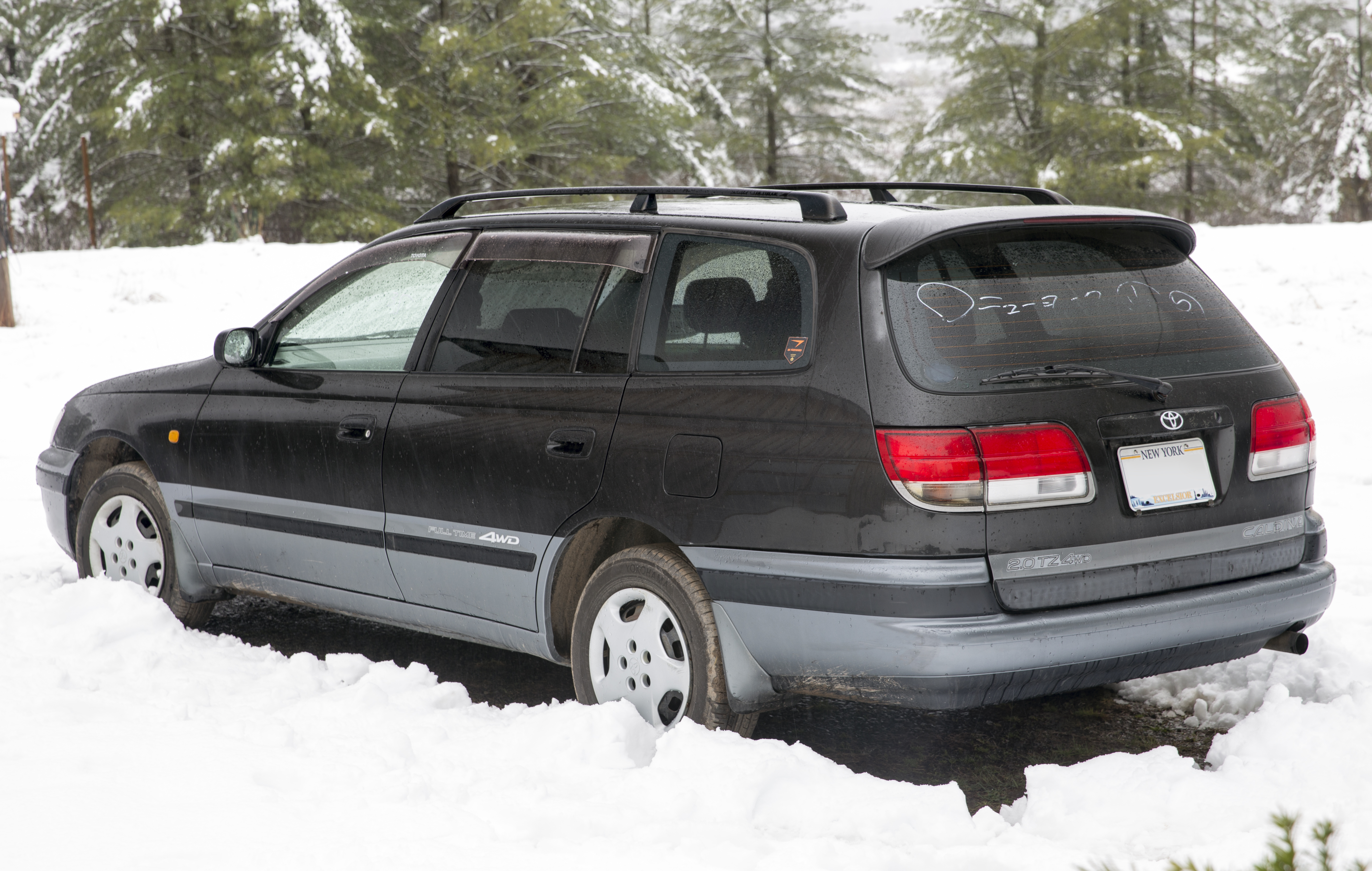
Caldina 2.0 TZ 4WD (ST195G; facelift, Japan)

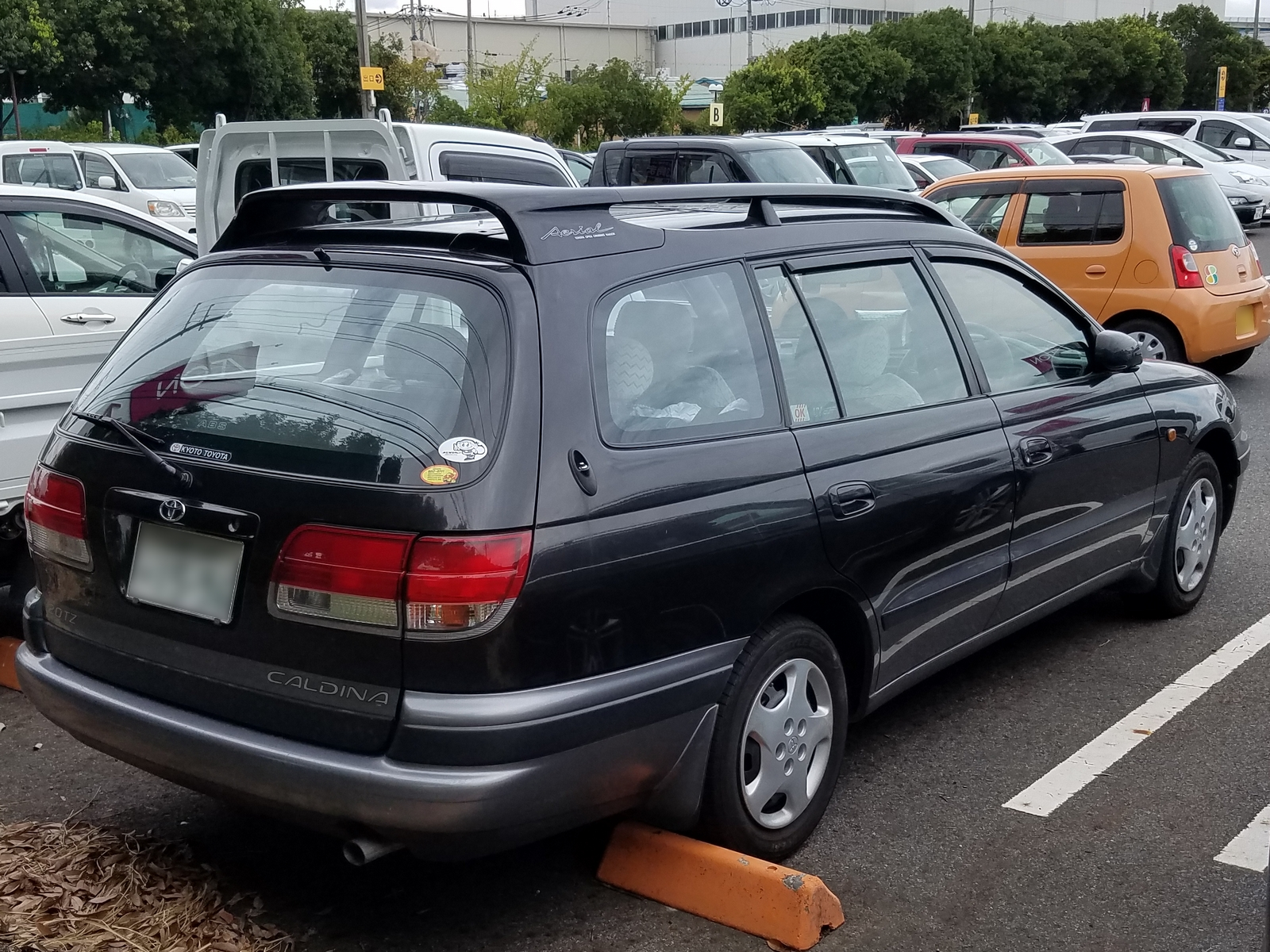
Caldina 2.0 TZ Aerial (ST191G; facelift, Japan)

== Second generation (T210; 1997) ==
Second generation
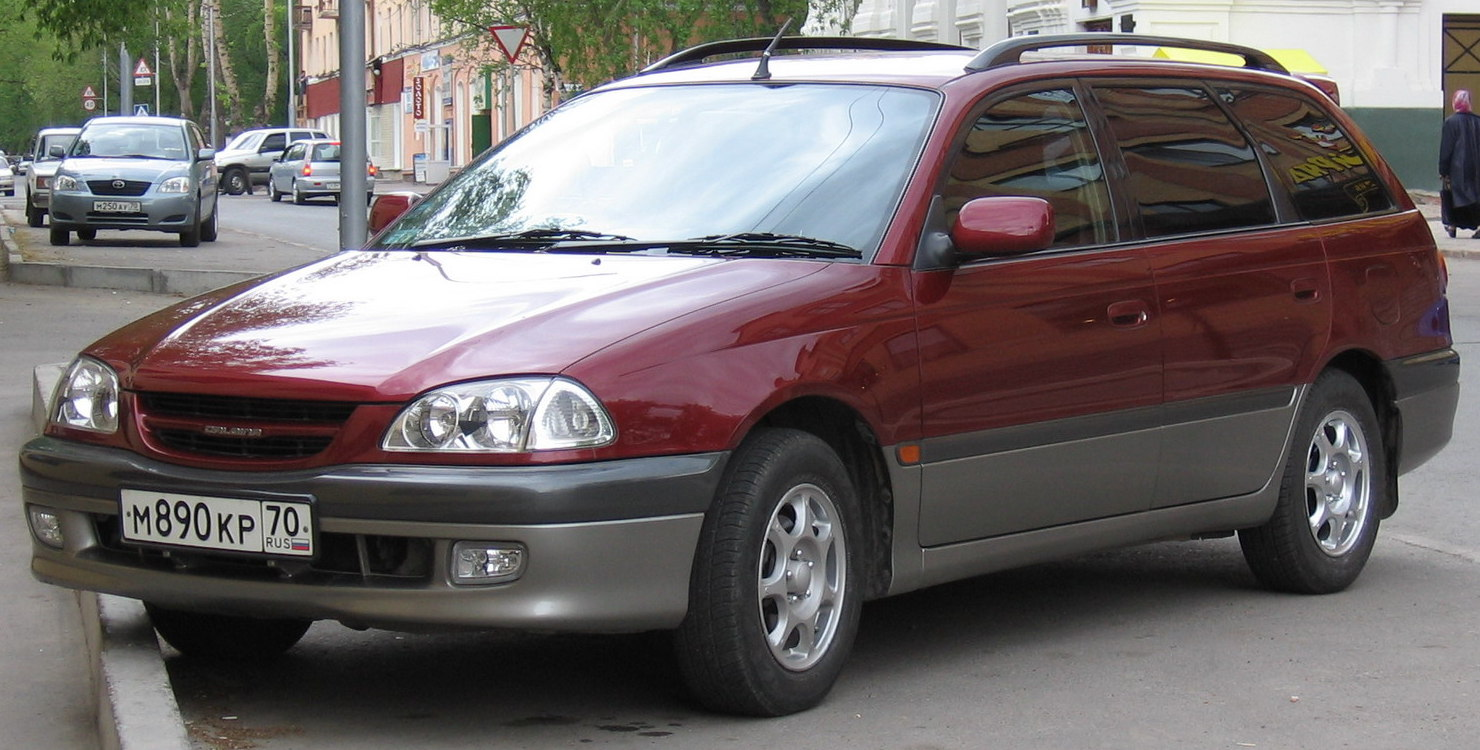
- 1997 Caldina 2.0 G (ST215G; pre-facelift)

Overview
- Model code: T210
- Also called: Toyota Avensis (T220)
- Production: September 1997 – September 2002
- Assembly: Japan: Toyota City, Aichi (Tsutsumi plant)

Body and chassis
- Body style: 5-door station wagon
- Related: Toyota Avensis Picnic/Ipsum/Picnic/SportsVan (XM10); Toyota Carina (T210); Toyota Celica (T200); Toyota Corona (T210)

Powertrain
- Engine: petrol: 1.8 L 7A-FE I4 (AT211); 2.0 L 3S-FE I4 (ST210/215); 2.0 L 3S-GE I4 (ST210/215); 2.0 L 3S-GTE turbo I4 (ST215); diesel: 2.2 L 3C-TE turbo I4 (CT216)
- Power output: 115 PS (85 kW) (7A-FE); 135–140 PS (99–103 kW) (3S-FE); 190 PS (140 kW) (3S-GE); 260 PS (191 kW) (3S-GTE); 94 PS (69 kW) (3C-TE)
- Transmission: 5-speed manual; 4-speed automatic

Dimensions
- Wheelbase: 2,580 mm (101.6 in)
- Length: 4,520 mm (178.0 in)
- Width: 1,695–1,720 mm (66.7–67.7 in)
- Height: 1,475–1,570 mm (58.1–61.8 in)
- Kerb weight: 1,280 kg (2,822 lb)

The second-generation Caldina is the Japanese version of the European Avensis wagon with door handles taken from the E110 series Corolla and the T210 series Corona Premio, launched in Japan in September 1997. There was no commercial version available of the second generation Caldina; the first generation Caldina Van continued to be sold alongsed the T210 instead.

Engines include a 1.8 L 7A-FE petrol, the 2.0 L 3S-FE petrol and the 2.2 L 3C-TE turbo-diesel. The All-Trac four-wheel drive models are coded ST215, and were also offered as GT models with the 3S-GE VVT-i (BEAMS - Breakthrough Engine with Advanced Mechanism System) engine. The top-of-the-line GT-T came with the turbocharged, 260 PS (191 kW; 256 hp) fourth-generation 3S-GTE engine, and included an all-wheel drive system using a viscous centre differential a similar to the Celica GT-Four.

Originally, the GT-T was only offered with a five-speed manual, but a Manumatic four-speed automatic version was added in November 1997. When optioned with the automatic transmission the GT-T also came standard with VSC. Other options available on the GT and GT-T models included replacing the dashboard storage compartment with either Toyota's voice navigation system, or a multi-function display. Multiple special versions were offered which includes the Aerial versions of the Caldina feature a large sunroof and contoured roof racks as standard. The sportier version of the Caldina was the Active Sports Variant featuring a new striking bodykit, a split headlight design similar to the Toyota Celica's front headlight design and also Active Sports graphics along the front driver and passenger doors. Weighing 1,440 kg (3,175 lb), the manual Caldina GT-T has a 0–100 km/h (0–62 mph) time of 6.4 seconds, with the automatic version only 0.1 seconds slower.

A refresh was given in 2000 with new plastic bumpers, plastic headlights, and updated clear taillights as opposed to the generic red taillights from the pre-facelift. The mostly-plastic interior was also updated with notable additions including a new white gauge cluster, as well as minor chrome and faux-wood touches to the 2.0G model, amongst other changes across the model range.

In 2001, an extra lug was added to the turbo manifold to prevent the manifold from warping which had been a common issue on GT-T models. Reliability of the GT-T engines proved to be a concern throughout the lifespan of the 3S powered GT-Ts, with spun main bearings and shattered oil pump gears being common issues amongst owners.

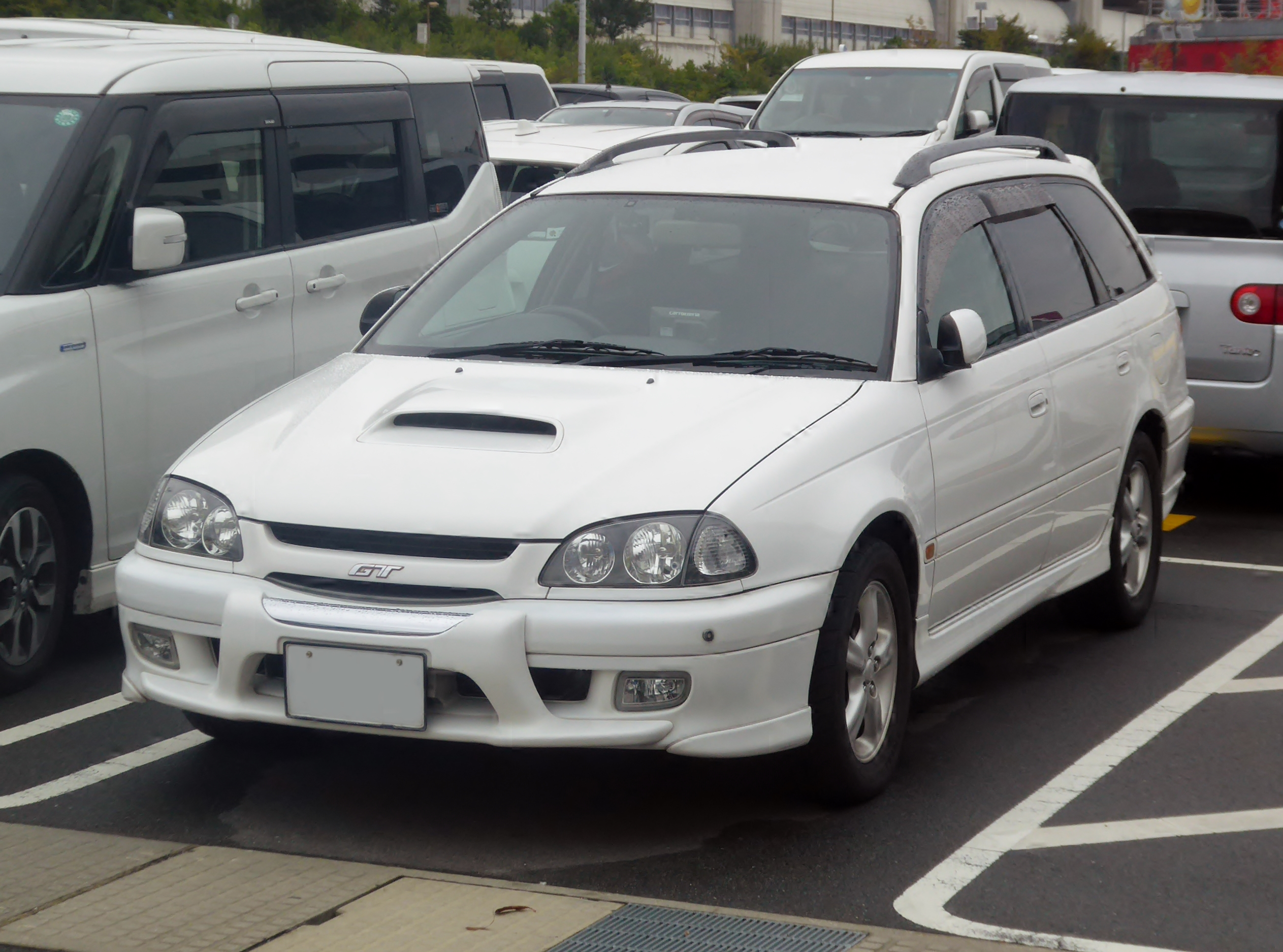
Caldina GT-T (ST215W; pre-facelift, Japan)

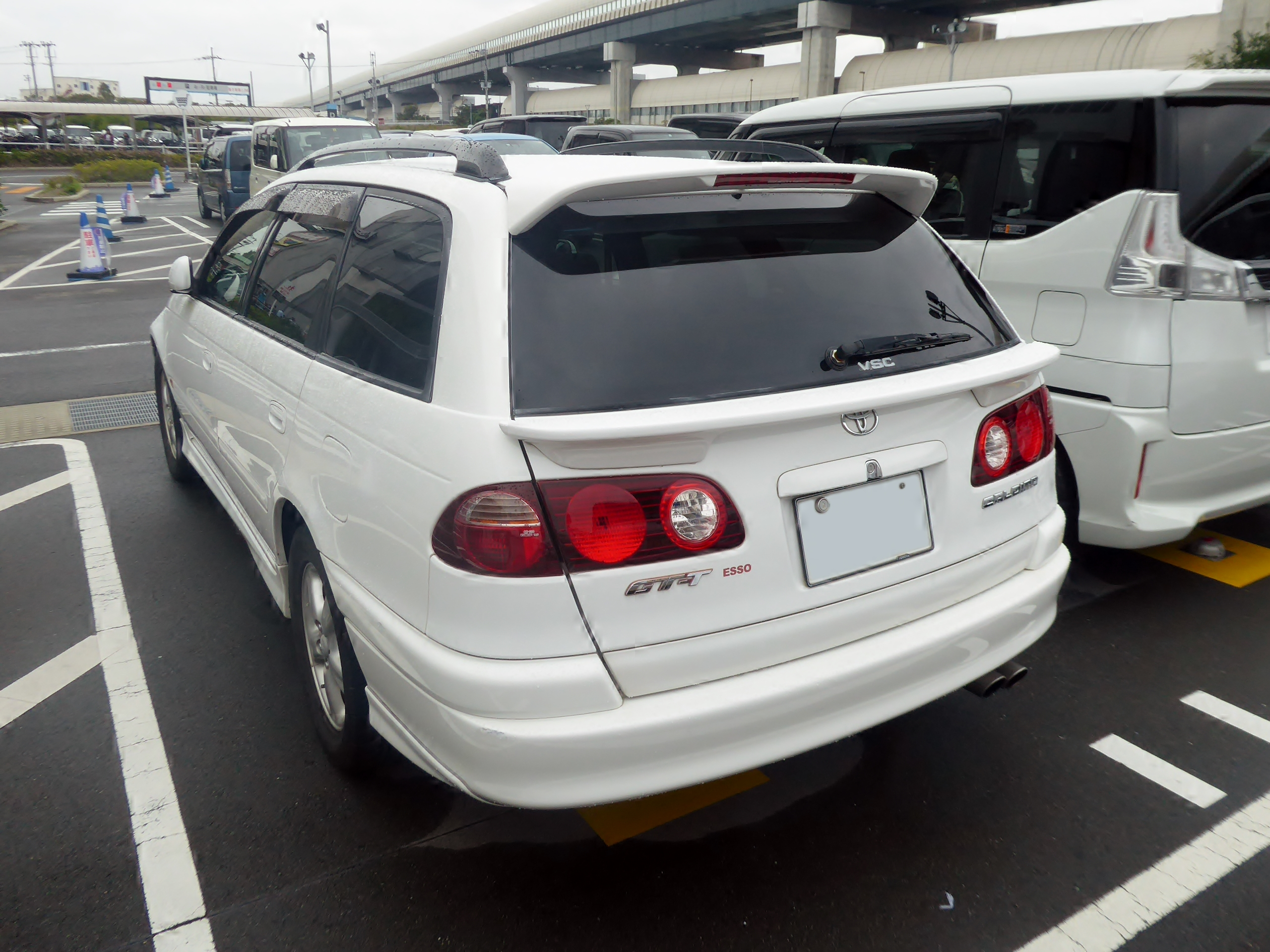
Caldina GT-T (ST215W; pre-facelift, Japan)

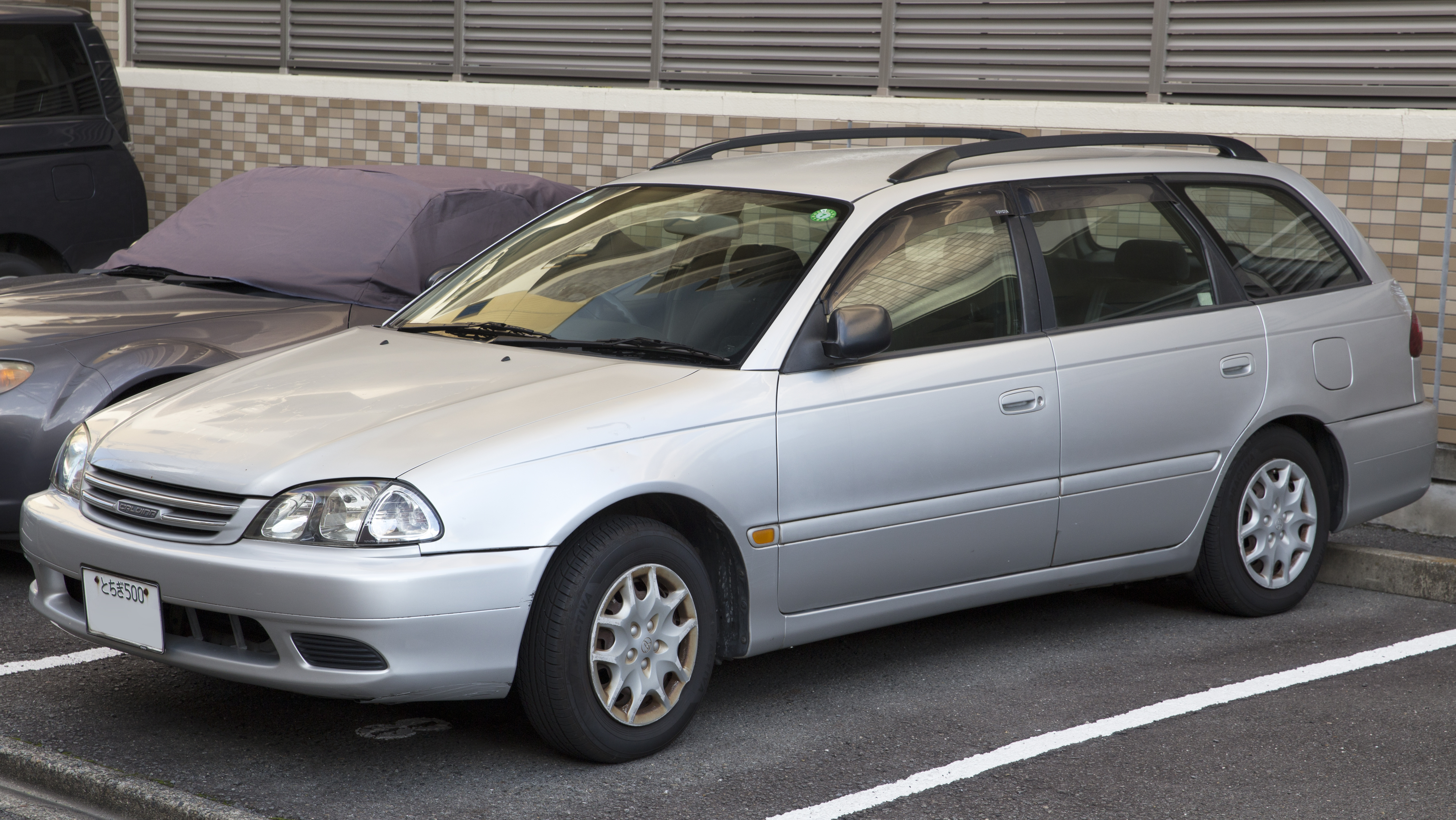
2000 Caldina 1.8 E (AT211G; facelift, Japan)

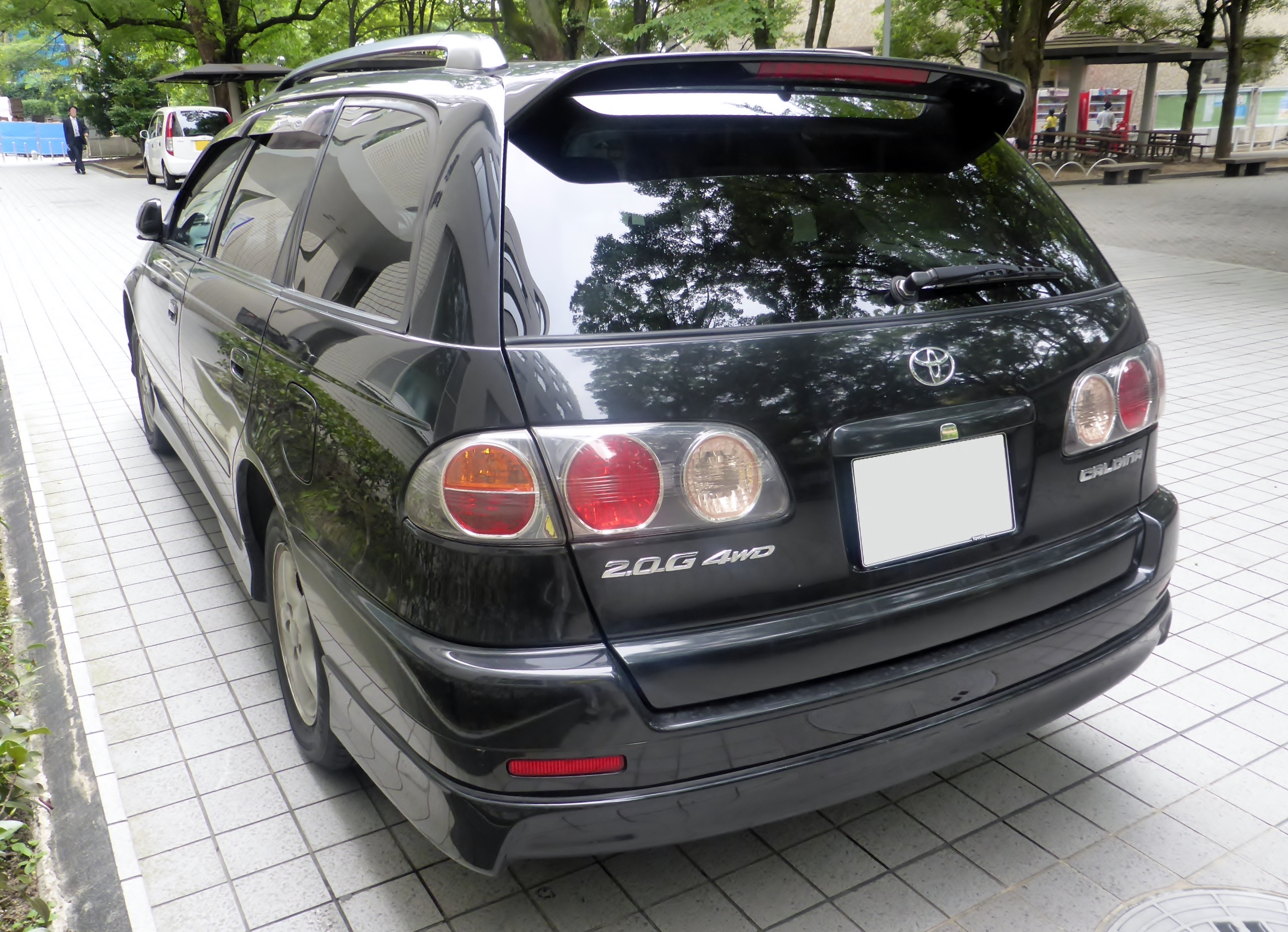
Caldina 2.0 G 4WD (ST215G; facelift, Japan)

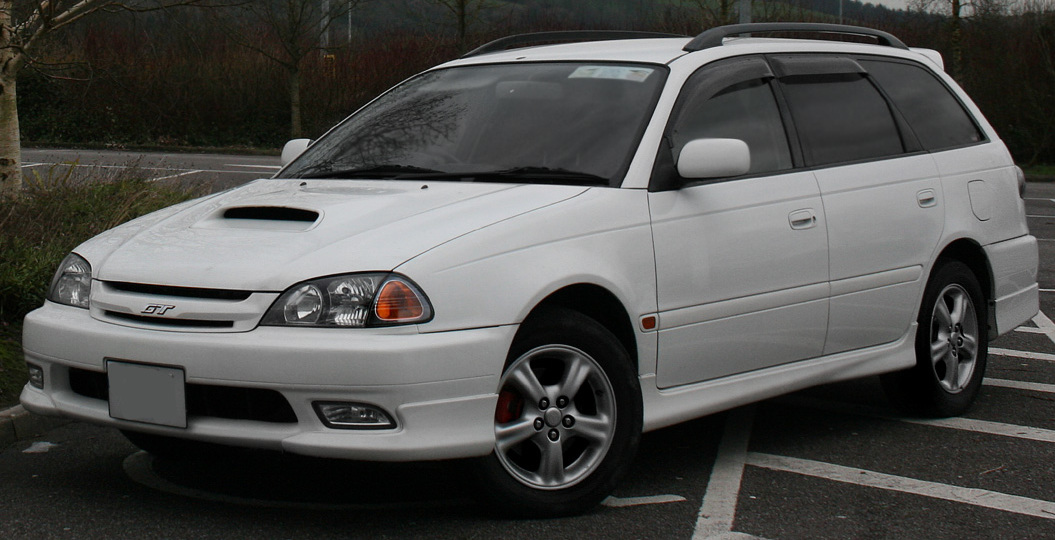
Caldina GT-T (ST215W; facelift, Japan)

== Third generation (T240; 2002) ==
Third generation
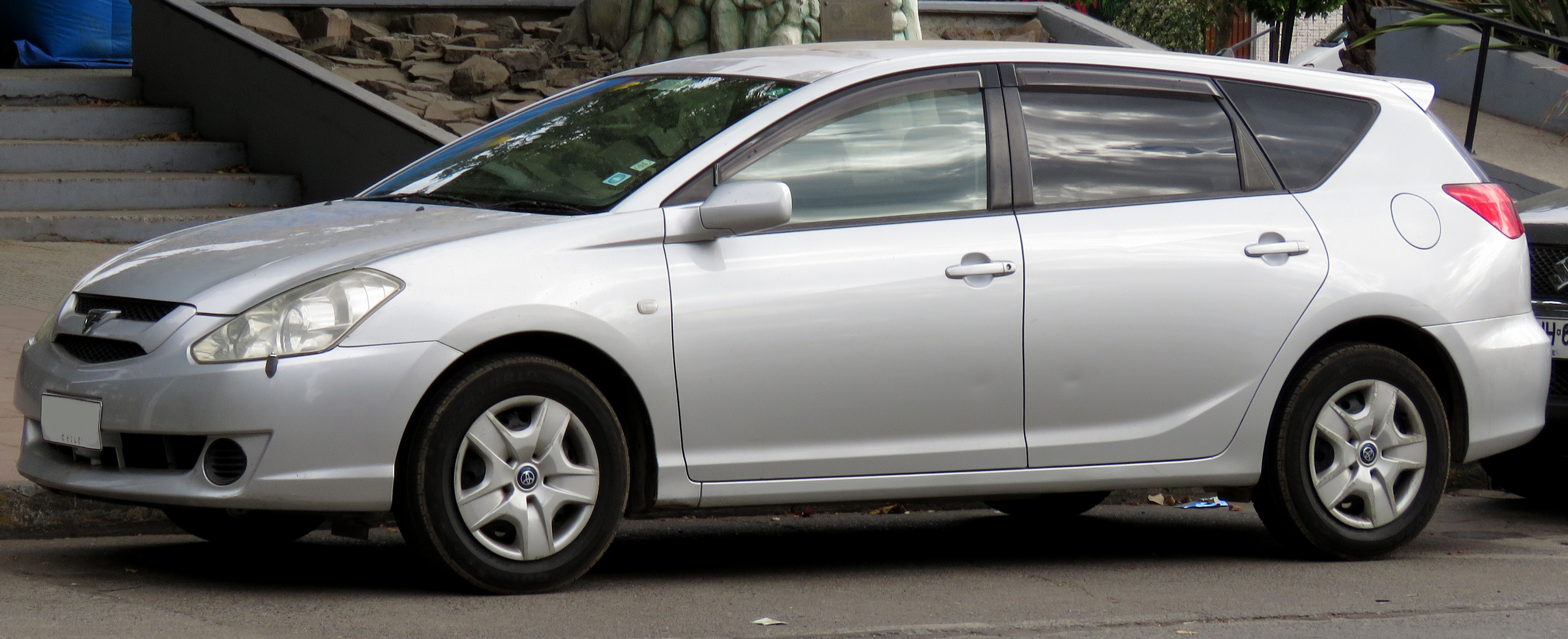
- 2003 Caldina 1.8 X (ZZT241W; pre-facelift)

Overview
- Model code: T240
- Production: September 2002 – June 2007
- Assembly: Japan: Toyota City, Aichi (Tsutsumi plant)
- Designer: Shogo Tokutake and Tetsu Endo

Body and chassis
- Body style: 5-door station wagon
- Platform: Toyota MC platform
- Related: Toyota Premio (T240); Toyota Allion (T240); Toyota Avensis (T250)

Powertrain
- Engine: Petrol: 1.8 L 1ZZ-FE I4 (ZZT241); 2.0 L 1AZ-FSE I4 (AZT241 FWD /AZT246 AWD); 2.0 L 3S-GTE turbo I4 (ST246)
- Power output: 97 kW (130 hp; 132 PS) (1ZZ-FE); 114 kW (153 hp; 155 PS) (1AZ-FSE); 191 kW (256 hp; 260 PS) (3S-GTE)
- Transmission: 4-speed automatic

Dimensions
- Wheelbase: 2,700 mm (106.3 in)
- Length: 4,510 mm (177.6 in)
- Width: 1,740 mm (68.5 in)
- Height: 1,445 mm (56.9 in)
- Kerb weight: 1,240–1,490 kg (2,734–3,285 lb)

The third-generation Caldina launched in September 2002 was marketed as a pure sports wagon and does not share body panels with Allion, Premio and Avensis. It had shorter overhangs compared to the previous model with a longer wheelbase but a shorter length, and featured an overall lower height with a fastback-like rear design for better aerodynamics and a sportier appearance. Like other Toyota's, it made a switch to the MC Platform while using the "sportier" version of that platform (MacPherson suspension at the front and double wishbone suspension at the rear) shared with the Celica, Avensis, Blade (sports version of the Auris/Corolla) and many others. The lineup also got simplified, with no diesel engine and new generation AZ and ZZ engines featuring VVT-i, the 3S-FE was replaced by the 1ZZ-FE and the 3S-GE by the less powerful 1AZ-FSE.

The car also featured an optional reversing camera and standard GPS navigation.

Engines for the Caldina are 1.8 L 1ZZ-FE, 2.0 L 1AZ-FSE and 2.0 L turbocharged 3S-GTE, marking the final 5th/4.5th gen of the 3S-GTE. Trim levels are 1.8 X, 1.8 Z, 2.0 Z, 2.0 ZT and GT-Four. The GT-Four was also offered as a base model C-Edition and the sportier N-Edition. The ZT is a sportier variant of the Z featuring a special body kit. All models have automatic transmission and the GT-Four model only comes in a tiptronic transmission with a "+" "-" selector on the auto gear switcher.

The high-performance Caldina carried the Celica's legendary GT-Four trim level, engine, and an AWD system for traction on all surfaces. Like the older generations of Celica GT-Four, the only engine for the ST246 Caldina GT-Four is the 3S-GTE. Like the Celica, the car featured a hood scoop to fed air to the top mount air-to-air intercooler, which was smaller than in previous iterations of the 3S-GTE (oil cooler removed as well). In the Caldina, it retained the same power output of 260 PS (191 kW) at 6,200 rpm and torque of 324 N⋅m (239 lb⋅ft) at 4,400 rpm as in the previous generation Caldina GT-T. The GT-Four had a curb weight of about 1,480 kg (3,263 lb).

As a tribute to Hiromu Naruse, Toyota's motorsports development guru and the creator of the first Celica GT-Four (as well as all Celica generations and other legends, like the LFA and 2000GT), a special edition Caldina GT-Four was produced, the Caldina GT-Four N Edition (N for Naruse). This model was equipped with several performance enhancements specified by Naruse and tuned on the B-Roads around the Nürburgring, making it a B-Road weapon similar to the Celica, which also excelled on gravel:

- Sports ABS
- Improved shocks with a monotube design and altered spring ratings
- Front upper strut bar
- Torsen rear LSD
- Recaro front seats and interior trim

Curb weight of the N Edition was about 1,490 kg (3,280 lb), slightly more than the normal GT-Four due to the LSD and the additional performance equipment giving it even more rally car like handling.

A facelift was given in January 2005. The Caldina received a restyled front end with a new bumper, grille and rear combination lamps. The GT-Four was only offered as the regular model for the last production period, as the C-Edition and N-Edition were discontinued.

Production of the third-generation Caldina ended in mid-2007 without a direct successor, but was indirectly replaced with the T270 series Avensis wagon/estate imported from the UK.

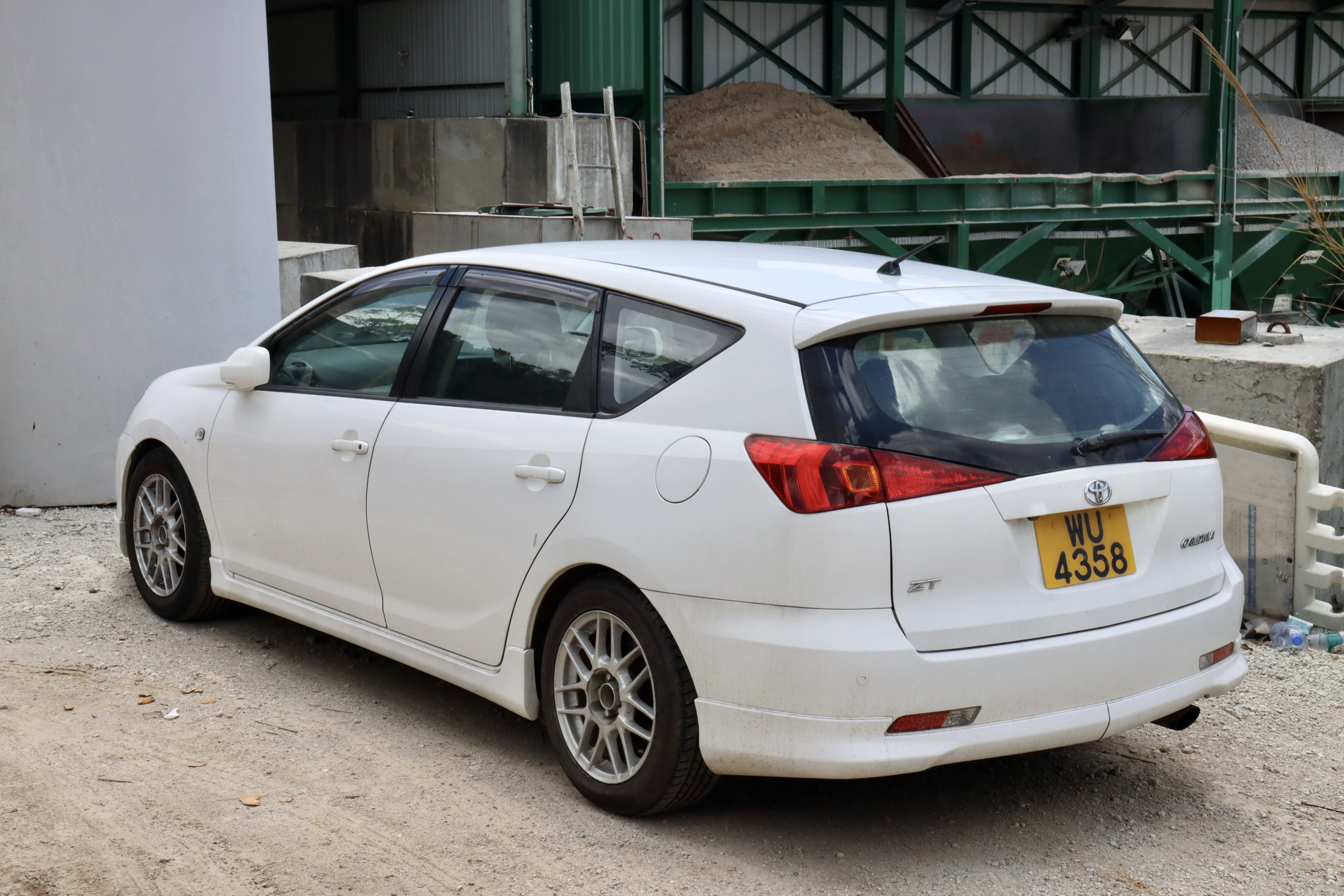
Pre-facelift Caldina 2.0 ZT (AZT241, Japanese-spec) in Hong Kong

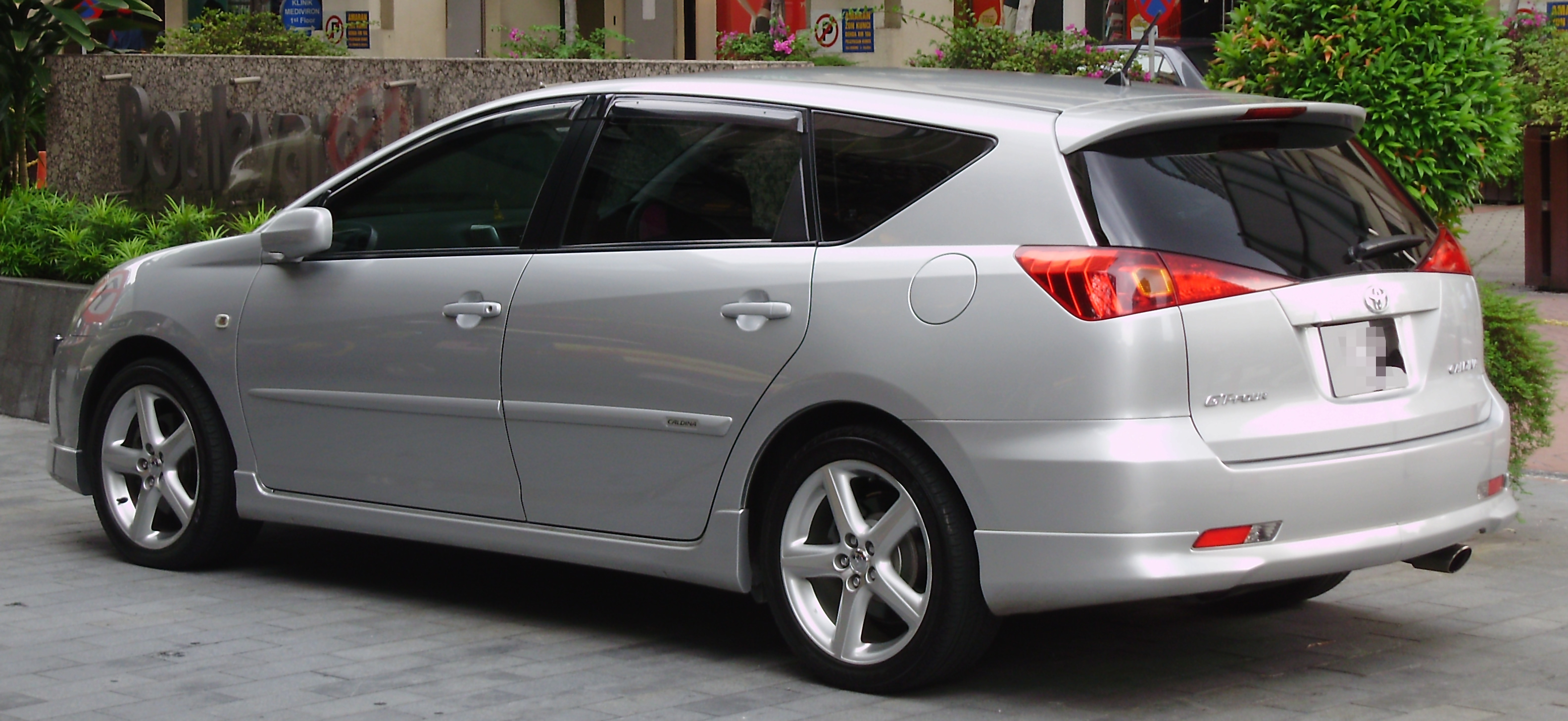
Pre-facelift Caldina GT-Four (ST246, Japanese-spec) in Malaysia

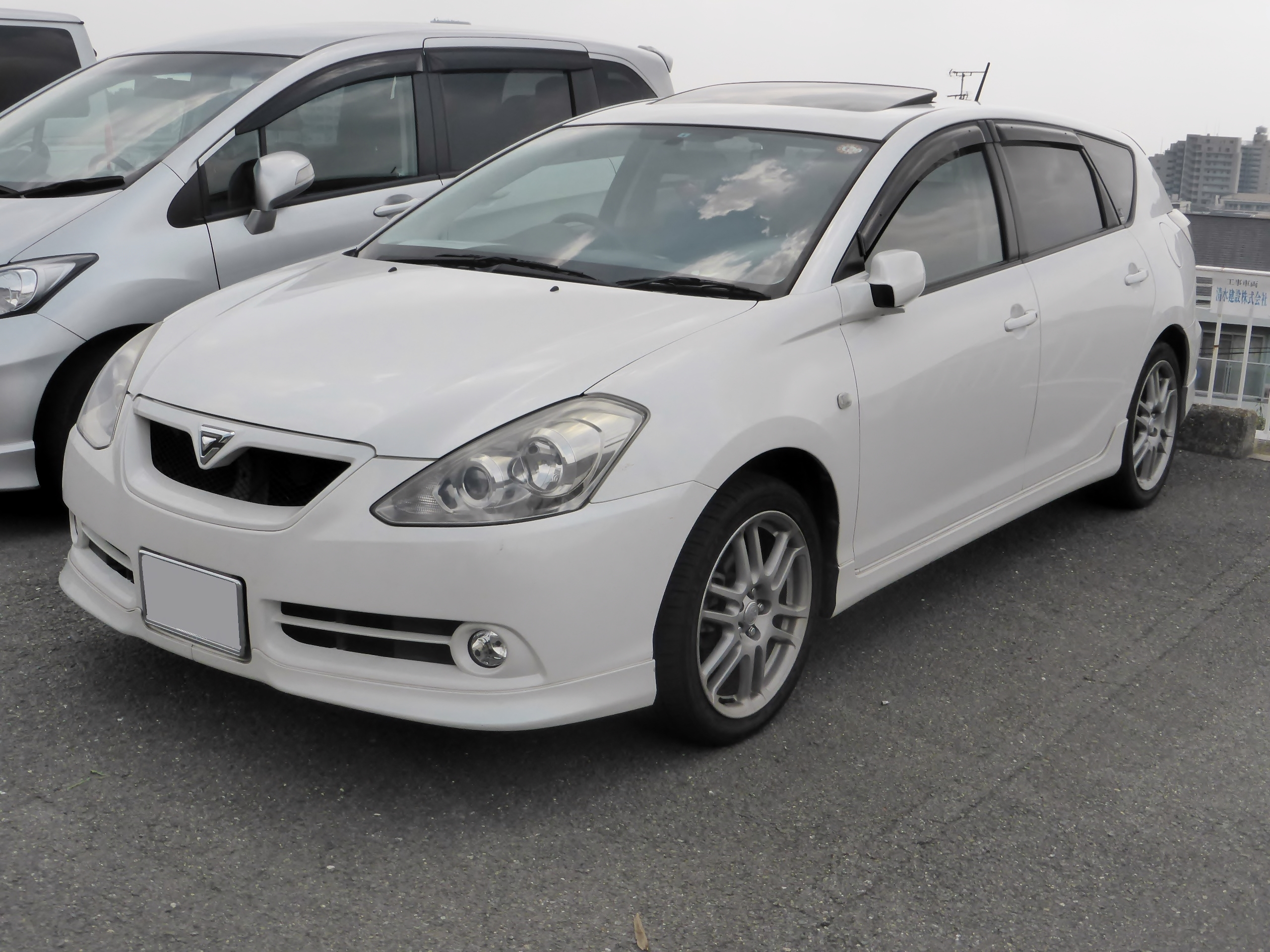
Facelift Caldina ZT 4WD (AZT246W, Japan)

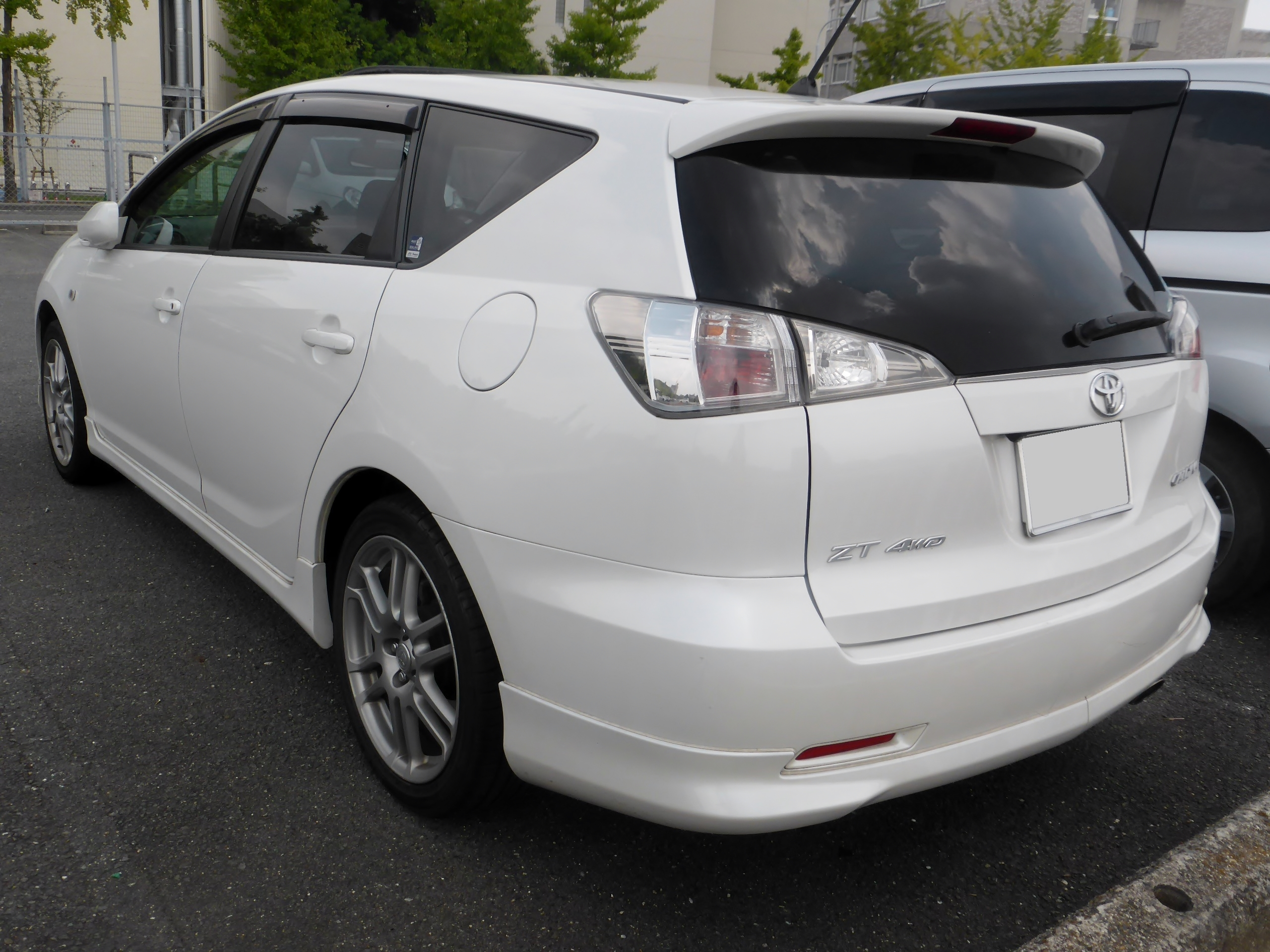
Facelift Caldina ZT 4WD (AZT246W, Japan)

== See also ==
- List of Toyota vehicles
