= Yuzurenai Negai =

Single by Naomi Tamura

from the album N'
- B-side: "Ano Hi no Futari wa Mou Inai" (あの日の二人はもういない, The Couple From That Day Are No Longer Here)
- Released: 9 November 1994
- Length: 3:54
- Label: Primitive Records; Polydor Records
- Songwriters: Naomi Tamura; Hiroto Ishikawa
- Producers: Joey Carbone; Keisuke Tsukimitsu

Naomi Tamura singles chronology
"Eien no Ichi-byo" (1994)	"Yuzurenai Negai" (1994)	"Stairway" (1995)

"Yuzurenai Negai" (ゆずれない願い, Unyielding Wish) is a song by Naomi Tamura, released on November 9, 1994 as a single from her album N'. It was used as the opening theme for the first season of the anime series Magic Knight Rayearth and has become Tamura's signature song. It was selected as one of the winners of the Heisei Anime Song Awards in the category of Artist song for the years 1989–1999.

== Track listing ==
No.	Title	Length
1.	"ゆずれない願い (An Unyielding Wish)"	3:54
2.	"あの日の二人はもういない (The Couple From That Day Are No Longer Here)"	4:44
3.	"ゆずれない願い (An Unyielding Wish)" (Instrumental)	3:54

== Personnel ==
- Naomi Tamura – Vocals
- Kenji Kitajima – Guitar
- Norio Sakai – Bass
- Yuuichi Togashigi – Drums
