= List of Clamp works =

This is a list of publications created by Clamp, an all-female Japanese manga artist group. Clamp was originally a simultaneous joint global collaboration with Dark Horse Comics.

== Unfinished/current works ==
Name	Volumes Released	Serialized in
Clover	4	Ran in the now cancelled Amie magazine.
Legal Drug (合法 ドラッグ, Gōhō Drug)	5	Ran in a magazine from 2003–2011. Resumed on November 4, 2011 in Young Ace under the title Drug & Drop.
X (X, Ekkusu)	19	Not running in any magazine since March 2003. Social problems in Japan prevent Kadokawa from releasing further chapters.
Gate 7 (ゲート セブン, Gēto Sebun)	4	Originally a one-shot, the actual series began serialization in Jump SQ in 2011. The volumes are set to release by Dark Horse Comics in North America, and other companies worldwide, beginning in summer 2011.
xxxHolic Rei	5	A new xxxHolic manga titled XXXHOLiC Rei (XXXHOLiC ◆ 戻 < レイ >?, lit. "xxxHolic Return") was announced at The CLAMP Festival 2012 event. It was scheduled to be published in Kodansha's Young Magazine in February 2013, however a month's delay in the magazine's issue release dates changed this to March 2013. The series has published on an irregular schedule, with its most recent compiled volume released in 2016 and a pause in serialization in Young Magazine between March 2017 and April 2025.

== Completed works ==
From	To	English Translated Title (Japanese Title)	Publisher Serialized in	Volumes
1989	1996	RG Veda (聖伝, Sei-den RG Veda)	Shinshokan; Wings	10
1990	1991	Man of Many Faces (20面相におねがい!!, 20 Mensō ni Onegai!!)	Kadokawa Shoten; Newtype	2
1990	1993	Tokyo Babylon (東京BABYLON, Tōkyō BABYLON)	Shinshokan; Wings	7
1992	1993	Clamp School Detectives (CLAMP学園探偵団, Clamp Gakuen Tanteidan)	Kadokawa Shoten; Asuka Comics DX	3
1992	1993	Duklyon: Clamp School Defenders (学園特警デュカリオン, Gakuen Tokkei Dyukarion)	Kadokawa Shoten; Newtype	2
1992	1992	Shirahime-Syo: Snow Goddess Tales (白姫抄, Shirahime-Shō)	Kadokawa Shoten; Asuka Comics DX	1
1992	1994	Legend of Chun Hyang (新・春香伝, Shin Shunka-den)	Hakusensha; Serie Mystery-Special	1
1993	1995	Magic Knight Rayearth (魔法騎士レイアース, Majikku Naito (Mahō Kishi) Reiāsu)	Kodansha; Nakayoshi	6
1993	1995	Miyuki-chan in Wonderland (不思議の国の美幸ちゃん, Fushigi no Kuni no Miyuki-chan)	Kadokawa Shoten; Newtype	1
1993	1995	The One I Love (わたしのすきなひと, Watashi no Suki na Hito)	Kadokawa Shoten; Young Rose Comics DX	1
1995	1998	Wish	Kadokawa Shoten; Asuka Comics DX	4
1996	2000	Cardcaptor Sakura (カードキャプター さくら, Kādokyaputā Sakura)	Kodansha; Nakayoshi	12
1999	2001	Angelic Layer (エンジェリック レイヤー, Enjerikku Reiyā)	Kadokawa Shoten; Monthly Shōnen Ace	5
1999	2000	Suki (｢すき.だからすき｣, "Suki; Dakara Suki")	Kadokawa Shoten; Asuka Comics	3
2001	2002	Chobits (ちょびっツ, Chobittsu)	Kodansha; Young Magazine	8
2003	2009	Tsubasa: Reservoir Chronicle (ツバサ−RESERVoir CHRoNiCLE−, Tsubasa Rezaboa Kuronikuru)	Kodansha; Weekly Shōnen Magazine	28
2004	2011	xxxHOLIC (×××ホリック Horikku)	Kōdansha; Young Magazine (2003—2010); Bessatsu Shōnen Magazine (2010—2011)	19
2004	2004	Clamp no Kiseki (CLAMPノキセキ, Clamp no Kiseki)	Kodansha	12
2005	2011	Kobato. (こばと.)	Shogakukan/Kadokawa Shoten; Monthly Sunday Gene-X (seven chapters)/Newtype (rest of series)	6
2014	2016	Tsubasa WoRLD CHRoNiCLE: Niraikanai (ツバサ WoRLD CHRoNiCLE ニライカナイ編, Tsubasa Wārudo Kuronikuru Niraikanai-hen)	Kodansha Magazine Special	3
2016	2024	Cardcaptor Sakura: Clear Card (カードキャプターさくら クリアカード編, Kādokyaputā Sakura Kuria Kādo-hen)	Kodansha; Nakayoshi	16

== Early works ==
From	To	Name	Publisher and Series	Volumes Released
		Cluster (クラスター, CLUSTER)	Shinkigensha	7
December 1989	December 1989	Derayd (界境天秤の月 Derayd, Kaikyōtenbin no Tsuki Derayd)	Shinkigensha	1
		Like Stars Army War (破軍星戦記, Hagun Seisenki)	Fusion Product	1

== Short works ==
These are short works that were only available in monthly magazines; they were never published in tankōbon form.

Name	Date Published	Featured In
Tenshi no Bodyguard (天使のボディガード, Tenshi no Bodīgādo)	1989	Kobunsha Val Pretty
Shiawase ni Naritai (しあわせ に なりたい, Shiawase ni Naritai)	1990	Fusion Product Genki Tokuhon
Tenku Senki Shurato Original Memory: Dreamer (天空 戦記 シュラト (オリジナル メモリー)｢夢魔 (ドリーマー)｣, Tenkū Senki Shurato Orijinaru Memorī: Dorīmā)	1990	Kadokawa Shoten Newtype Comic Genki no Moto
Koi wa Tenka no Mawarimono (恋は天下のまわりもの, Koi wa Tenka no Mawarimono)	1990	Hakusensha Series
Left Hand (左手, Hidarite)	1994	Shinshokan South Summer
Sohryuden: Legend of the Dragon Kings (水都の四兄弟 創竜伝·外伝, Suito no Yonkyōdai Sōryūden Gaiden)	1994	Kadokawa Shoten Monthly Mystery DX
Yumegari (夢狩り, Yumegari)	1996	Kadokawa Shoten Monthly Shōsetsu Asuka
Ano Hi o Shiru Mono wa Saiwai Dearu (あの日を知るものは幸いである, Ano Hi o Shiru Mono wa Saiwai Dearu)	2002	Kodansha Young Magazine Zoukan: Sports Sō
Murikuri (むりくり, Murikuri)	2002	Kodansha Young Magazine
Washizu	August 8, 2008	Monthly Kindai Mahjong Original
Shiritsu Horitsuba Gakuen (私立堀鐔学園, Horitsuba Private Academy)	2011	Shonen Magazine

== Collaborations ==
Name	Collaborated With	Type	Contribution
Anime Supremacy! (ハケンアニメ!, Haken Anime!)	Mizuki Tsujimura	Novel	Novel illustrations (1 volume)
Blood-C	Production I.G	Anime	Character design and story
Blood-C: The Last Dark	Production I.G	Anime film	Character design and story
Bludgeoning Angel Dokuro-Chan desu (撲殺天使ドクロちゃん です, Bokusatsu tenshi dokurochan desu)	Masaki Okayu	Novel	Novel illustrations (1 short story)
Cardfight!! Vanguard overDress (カードファイト!! ヴァンガード overDress, Kādofaito!! Vangādo overDress)	Kinema Citrus; Gift-o'-Animation; Studio Jemi	Anime	Character design
Cardfight!! Vanguard will+Dress (カードファイト!! ヴァンガード will+Dress, Kādofaito!! Vangādo will+Dress)	Kinema Citrus; Gift-o'-Animation; Studio Jemi	Anime	Character design
Cardfight!! Vanguard DivineZ (カードファイト!! ヴァンガード DivineZ, Kādofaito!! Vangādo DivineZ)	Kinema Citrus; Gift-o'-Animation; Studio Jemi	Anime	Character design
Clamp School Paranormal Investigators (Clamp 学園 怪奇現象 研究会 事件 ファイル, Clamp Gakuen Kaiki Genshō Kenkyūkai Jiken Fairu)	Tomiyuki Matsumoto	Manga	Manga illustrations and script
Code Geass: Akito the Exiled (コードギアス 亡国のアキト, Kōdo Giasu: Bōkoku no Akito)	Sunrise	OVA	Character design
Code Geass Genesic Re;Code (コードギアス Genesic Re;CODE, Kōdo Giasu: Re;CODE)	Sunrise, JORO	Smart phone game	Character design
Code Geass: Lelouch of the Rebellion (コードギアス 反逆のルルーシュ, Kōdo Giasu: Hangyaku no Rurūshu)	Sunrise	Anime	Character design, ending illustrations (season two)
Code Geass Lelouch of the Rebellion (コードギアス 反逆のルルーシュ, Kōdo Giasu Hangyaku no Rurūshu)	Sunrise	Anime film	Character design
Code Geass Lelouch of the Re;surrection (コードギアス 復活のルルーシュ, Kōdo Giasu: Fukkatsu no Rurūshu)	Sunrise	Anime film	Character design
Code Geass: Rozé of the Recapture (コードギアス 奪還のロゼ, Kōdo Giasu: Dakkan no Roze)	Sunrise	Anime film	Character design
Contact circa Spirit Girl (スピリッツ・ガールはお年頃, Supirittsu gāru wa o toshigoro)	Hiroshi Tsutsui	Novel	Novel illustrations (1 volume)
Gift	Yuzuru Hanyu	Picture book	Book illustrations (1 volume)
The Grimm Variations (グリム組曲, Gurimu Kumikyoku)	Netflix	Anime	Original character design
HiGH&LOW g-sword	Exile Tribe	Manga	Character design, manga illustrations (1 volume)
Kabukibu! (カブキブ!, Kabuki Club!)	Studio Deen	Anime	Anime Original Character design
Kamigami series (「神々」シリーズ, Kami shiriizu)	Atsuko Asano	Novel	Book illustrations (3 volumes)
KEY: Yoake no Vampire (KEI夜明けのヴァンパイア, KEI yoake no vu~anpaia)	Tomiyuki Matsumoto	Novel	Book illustrations (1 volumes)
Koi (恋, Koi)	Takeshi Okazaki	Manga	Manga script
Last Lost Juvenile Interlaced Parallel World (ラスト・ロスト・ジュブナイル Last Lost Juvenile 交錯のパラレルワールド, Rasuto rosuto jubunairu Last Lost Juvenile kōsaku no parareruwārudo)	Aki Nakamura	Novel	Novel illustrations (1 volume)
Logic Lock Festival: Paradox of Detective Killing (ロジック・ロック・フェスティバル Logic Lock Festival 探偵殺しのパラドックス, Rojikku rokku fesutibaru rojikku Lock fesutibaru tantei-goroshi no paradokkusu)	Aki Nakamura	Novel	Novel illustrations (1 volume)
Maihime Utakata Noki (舞姫・うたかたの記, Maihime utakata noki)	Mori Ōgai	Novem	Book illustrations
Majokan series (「魔女館」シリーズ, Majokan shiriizu)	Yōko Tsukumo	Novel	Book illustrations
Mouryou no Hako (魍魎の匣, Mōryō no Hako)	Madhouse Production	Anime	Character design
Mysteries of Yoshitsune I&II (MOONSAGA-義経秘伝-, MOONSAGA -Yoshitsune Hiden-)	Gackt	Stage play	Planning Cooperation, Costume Concept Design
Night Head	George Iida	Novel	Novel illustrations (2 Volumes)
Noroi no Kechimyaku (呪の血脈, Noroi no kechimyaku)	Kamon Nanami	Novel	Novel illustrations (1 Volumes)
Oshiroi Chouchou (おしろい蝶々, Oshiroi Chōchō)	Kamon Nanami·Akira	Manga	Manga illustrations (1 volume)
Rex: A Dinosaur's Story (REX 恐竜 物語, Rekkusu: Kyōryū Monogatari)	Hata Masanori	Manga	Manga illustrations and script (1 Volume)
Sansho Dayu Takasebune Abe Ichizoku (山椒大夫・高瀬舟・阿部一族, Sanshōdayū takasebune Abe ichizoku)	Mori Ōgai	Book	Book illustrations
Sohryuden: Legend of the Dragon Kings (創竜伝, Sōryūden)	Yoshiki Tanaka	Novel	Novel illustrations (12 volumes)
Shu no Ketsumyaku (呪の血脈, Shu no Ketsumyaku)	Kamon Nanami	Novel	Novel illustrations (1 volume)
Sweet Valerian (animated series) (スウィート·ヴァレリアン, Suwīto Varerian)	Madhouse Production	Anime	Character concept and design
Tekken 6 (鉄拳6)	Bandai Namco Games	Video game	Jin Kazama's 3P costume design
Tensai TV-kun MAX (天才てれびくんMAX, tensaiterebikun makkusu)	NHK Educational TV		Character Design, Girls Newsletter Character Happiko
Trick Trip Vacation Niji no Yakata Murder Party (トリック・トリップ・バケーション Trick Trip Vacation 虹の館の殺人パーティー, Torikku torippu bakēshon Trick torippu Vacation niji no yakata no satsujin pātī)	Aki Nakamura	Novel	Novel illustrations (1 volume)
Uma Musume Pretty Derby Anthology Comic STAR 2 (ウマ娘 プリティーダービー アンソロジーコミック STAR 2, Uma musume puritī dābī ansorojī komikku sutā 2)	Cygames	Manga	Cover illustrations

Clamp has authored other dōjinshi that are not listed above. Having started as a dōjinshi group, most of Clamp's dōjinshi are from their earlier years. A number of Clamp's earlier works are also not listed above.
