= Clamp no Kiseki =

Manga

CLAMP no Kiseki (CLAMPノキセキ, CLAMP's track or CLAMP's miracle) is a twelve volume series of anime books celebrating the 15th anniversary of Clamp in 2004. It is published in America by Tokyopop and in Spain by Norma Editorial. Each volume is a full-color, 32-page book that contains summaries of featured series, interviews with Clamp and friends of Clamp, artwork, and exclusive new short comics. In addition, each issue comes with three special chess pieces featuring characters from Clamp's various series.

All twelve volumes have been released in Japan, Spain, Germany, Hong Kong, Taiwan, and the United States.

== Volumes ==
#	Featured series	Cover art	Chess pieces
1	Cardcaptor Sakura	Sakura Kinomoto (Cardcaptor Sakura); Tomoyo Daidōji (Cardcaptor Sakura)	White Queen Sakura Kinomoto (Cardcaptor Sakura); White Pawn Mokona Modoki (Tsubasa: Reservoir Chronicle); Black Pawn Mokona Modoki (xxxHolic)
2	Cardcaptor Sakura; Clover; The One I Love	Sū (Clover); Ran (Clover)	White Queen Tomoyo Daidōji (Cardcaptor Sakura); Black Bishop Kimihiro Watanuki (xxxHolic); White Pawn Mokona Modoki (Tsubasa: Reservoir Chronicle)
3	Tokyo Babylon	Subaru Sumeragi (Tokyo Babylon); Hokuto Sumeragi (Tokyo Babylon)	White Bishop Subaru Sumeragi (Tokyo Babylon); White Pawn Mokona Modoki (Tsubasa: Reservoir Chronicle); Black Pawn Mokona Modoki (xxxHolic)
4	Magic Knight Rayearth; Angelic Layer	Hikaru Shidou (Magic Knight Rayearth); Misaki Suzuhara (Angelic Layer)	White Rook Misaki Suzuhara (Angelic Layer); Black Bishop Seishirō Sakurazuka (Tokyo Babylon); Black Pawn Mokona Modoki (xxxHolic)
5	Clamp School Detectives; Duklyon: Clamp School Defenders; Man of Many Faces	Nokoru Imonoyama (Clamp School Detectives, Duklyon: Clamp School Defenders); Suoh Takamura (Clamp School Detectives, Duklyon: Clamp School Defenders); Akira Ijyuin (Clamp School Detectives, Duklyon: Clamp School Defenders, Man of Many Faces)	Black Rook Sū (Clover); Black Knight Nokoru Imonoyama (Clamp School Detectives, (Clamp School Detectives, Duklyon: Clamp School Defenders); White Pawn Mokona Modoki (Tsubasa: Reservoir Chronicle)
6	RG Veda	Ashura (RG Veda); Dark Ashura (RG Veda)	White Knight Hikaru Shidou (Magic Knight Rayearth); Black Rook Ashura (RG Veda); Black Pawn Mokona Modoki (xxxHolic)
7	Chobits; Wish; Suki: A Like Story	Kohaku (Wish); Chī (Chobits)	White Rook Chī (Chobits); White Knight Akira Ijyuin (Clamp School Detectives, Duklyon: Clamp School Defenders, Man of Many Faces); White Pawn Mokona Modoki (Tsubasa: Reservoir Chronicle)
8	X	Kamui Shirō (X); Fūma Monō (X)	Black King Kamui Shirō (X) White Pawn Mokona Modoki (Tsubasa: Reservoir Chronicle); Black Pawn Mokona Modoki (xxxHolic)
9	X Miyuki-chan in Wonderland; Shirahime-Syo: Snow Goddess Tales	Miyuki (Miyuki-chan in Wonderland); Seishirō Sakurazuka (Tokyo Babylon, X)	Black King Fūma Monō (X); White Bishop Miyuki-chan (Miyuki-chan in Wonderland); Black Pawn Mokona Modoki (xxxHolic)
10	xxxHolic; Legal Drug	Yūko Ichihara (xxxHolic); Kimihiro Watanuki (xxxHolic)	Black Bishop Fai (Tsubasa: Reservoir Chronicle); Black Queen Yūko Ichihara (xxxHolic); White Pawn Mokona Modoki (Tsubasa: Reservoir Chronicle)
11	Tsubasa: Reservoir Chronicle; The Legend of Chun Hyang	Kurogane (Tsubasa: Reservoir Chronicle); Fai D. Flourite (Tsubasa: Reservoir Chronicle)	White Bishop Kohaku (Wish); Black Knight Kurogane (Tsubasa: Reservoir Chronicle); Black Pawn Mokona Modoki (xxxHolic)
12	Tsubasa: Reservoir Chronicle, Kobato	Syaoran (Tsubasa: Reservoir Chronicle); Kobato Hanato (Kobato)	White King Syaoran (Tsubasa: Reservoir Chronicle); White Pawn Mokona Modoki (Tsubasa: Reservoir Chronicle); Black Pawn Mokona Modoki (xxxHolic)

After collecting them all there was also a possibility to send in coupons within a limited time to receive a White King Kero-chan (Cardcaptor Sakura), a Black King Spinel Sun (Cardcaptor Sakura), a chess board and a magazine holder for the twelve magazines. This offer was not available outside Japan.

Spanish publisher Norma Editorial sold the magazine holder, chess board, and poster as a separate special edition volume. After all volumes were released, a bundle deal was sold to the public for 49,00 Euros. It included all volumes with their respective chess pieces as well as the special edition items. Like in Japan, the Spinel Sun and Kero-chan chess pieces were available to anyone who sent in 12 coupons (1 for each volume) to the publisher. Quantities were limited.

In 2006, French publisher Pika Edition had a preview sale of 50 Kero-chan and Spinel Sun Storage Boxes that only newsletter subscribers could purchase for 40 Euros. It was then announced that a limited quantity of 100 Storage Boxes would be made available to the rest of the public via Pika's website.

== Reception ==
Lesley Smith from Animefringe praised the work as being every fan's dream.
