= Clamp School Paranormal Investigators =

Japanese novel series

Clamp School Paranormal Investigators (CLAMP学園怪奇現象研究会事件ファイル, Clamp Gakuen Kaikigenshō Kenkyūkai Jiken Fairu) is a set of three illustrated novels written by Tomiyuki Matsumoto in collaboration with Japanese manga group, Clamp. These novels are based upon role-playing game (Clamp Gakuen TRPG) sessions played by Game master Tomiyuki Matsumoto, Takeshi Okazaki and Clamp members. The main characters are based on player characters played in the game sessions. The novels were published by Tokyopop in North America in 2004 and 2005.

The story takes place on Clamp Campus where a series of paranormal events are occurring. Misadventures and solutions occur as five students act as investigators of the supernatural incidents.

== Characters ==
Takayuki Usagiya (兎屋 高雪, Usagiya Takayuki)
A sixteen-year-old sophomore student of Clamp Campus' high school division, Class B. He is the master of Koizumi-san, a ghost who was once a maid of his family's household before her death. She is based on the player character that was used by Nanase Ohkawa.
Mifuyu Mizukagami (水鏡 美冬, Mizukagami Mifuyu)
An eighteen-year-old third year student of Clamp Campus' high school division, Class Z. Despite her innocent appearance and air-headed personality, she is a master swordfighter. She carries around her master blade, Kotetsu, all the time and will cut down any enemy who dares to cross her path. Mifuyu is based on the player character that was used by Satsuki Igarashi.
Yuki Ajiadou (亜細亜堂 ユウキ, Ajiadō Yūki)
A sophomore student of the high school division in Class A. Yuki is a transgender girl; due to the understanding of gender roles at the time of publication, Yuki was presented as a boy dressed as a girl. With the ability to teleport, Yuki is a psychic who dreams of becoming an extraordinary actress. Yuki is based on the player character used by Takeshi Okazaki.
Rion Ibuki (伊吹 りおん, Ibuki Rion)
A second year student the middle school division's Class C, fourteen-year-old Rion is a member of a proper Shinto family and was born and raised in a shrine. She is the youngest of a long line of revered spiritual mediums and possesses the power to see spirits and read their thoughts. She is based on the player character that was used by Tsubaki Nekoi.
Koji Takamura (鷹村 光司, Takamura Kōji)
Eleven-year-old Koji is a member of elementary school division in sixth grade in Class A. A member of the prestigious Takamura clan of ninjas, Koji is talented in the arts associated with his family. Unfortunately, he doesn't have a height that matches the level of his skills. Koji is also the cousin of Takamura Suoh of Clamp School Detectives. He is based on the player character that was used by Mokona.

== Drama CDs ==
In addition to the three light novels, three drama CDs have been released, entitled File 1, File 2, and Strike Sparks.
