= Clover (Clamp manga) =

Manga series created by Clamp

- Cover of the first manga volume of Clover
- Genre: Fantasy, cyberpunk
- Manga
- Written by: Clamp
- Published by: Kodansha
- English publisher: NA: Kodansha Comics
- Magazine: Amie
- Original run: 1997 – 1999 (Note: Permanent hiatus)
- Volumes: 4
- Anime film
- Directed by: Kitarō Kōsaka; Kō Matsuo (unit director)
- Music by: Ichiko Hashimoto
- Studio: Madhouse
- Released: August 21, 1999
- Runtime: 5 minutes

Clover (stylized in all caps) is a manga series created by Clamp, a creative team made up by Satsuki Igarashi, Nanase Ohkawa, Tsubaki Nekoi, and Mokona. The manga takes place in a dystopian future, where the government is out to control the "Clovers", a race of children with special powers.

Clover was serialized in Kodansha's Amie from 1997 until the magazine's demise in 1999. Kodansha Comics released the entire series in English as one hardcover volume in 2020.

== Synopsis ==
=== Setting ===
Clover is set in a futuristic world where 10 years ago, the government launched the Clover Leaf Project, a nationwide search for children with magical abilities. These children are dubbed "Clovers" and ranked according to the strength of their powers, with four-leaf being the strongest. Higher leafs have more advanced abilities, such as being able to determine the locations and powers of lower leafs. The only four-leaf Clover, Su, has abilities so immense that she is confined to a military research facility, and her rank is kept secret. She is monitored by a parliamentary military council known as the Wizards, and sought after by the army of Azaiea, a country located beyond a mountain border.

=== Plot ===
==== Volumes 1-2 ====
During a meeting with General Ko, one of the five Wizards, Kazuhiko Fay Ryu resigns from his position as deputy commander of the parliamentary military. Kazuhiko is indebted to Ko after she saved him from court-martial on several occasions, and to pay her back, she orders him to meet Su and fulfill her final wish. Ko also imprints Kazuhiko with a tattoo that grants him temporary magic powers. With help from Gingetsu and his partner Ran, Kazuhiko and Su use a teleportation device to reach Fairy Park, Su's chosen destination. However, the device is hijacked and the two emerge in Azaiea, where they are subdued by the Xiao Mao. The Xiao Mao's leader lets them go after learning of Kazuhiko's reputation in the underground, and offers to hold off the Azaiean Army led by Bols.

Using technology that tracks the radiation of their weapons, Bols approaches the two and challenges Kazuhiko to a duel. He pins Kazuhiko with a blade while Azaiean soldiers go after Su, but Gingetsu comes to their rescue and brings them to safety. While being escorted in a car, Su sings a song composed by Ora, Kazuhiko's deceased lover. They stay at a government hotel, which gets invaded by soldiers working for the Wizards, and Su conjures mechanical wings to carry them both out of the building. Afterwards, Su reveals to Kazuhiko that she is a four-leaf Clover. She explains the purpose of the Clover Leaf Project, and mentions the existence of three Clovers of the three-leaf rank, though only two are still alive.

After another encounter with Bols, Ran teleports the duo to Fairy Park, which has a statue of a fairy that Su associates with Ora. Su confesses that she used to talk with Ora over radio waves, and despite never meeting in person, she was her first real friend. Ora told Su about the outside world, her relationship with Kazuhiko, and her ability to know when she would die. They had also written a song titled "CLOVER" together, which the statue recites in honor of Ora. While exploring the park, Su shares that as a child, her parents sold her to the military to experiment on her powers, then professes her love for Kazuhiko. Suddenly, the Wizards take control of Ora's statue and manipulate the park's structures to attack them. Kazuhiko is injured in the attack, but with Su's help, he summons a laser cannon to destroy the statue. Gingetsu arrives to retrieve Kazuhiko and arrest Bols, who was spectating the duo, while Su stays at the ruined park. Having found her happiness, Su thanks Kazuhiko and self-destructs, setting the park ablaze.

General Ko tells the Wizards how Su promised to destroy herself upon reaching Fairy Park, and that Kazuhiko also needed to die out of fear that anyone Su became emotionally attached to would use her as a weapon to control the world.

==== Volumes 3-4 ====
Volumes 3–4 depict events before Volumes 1–2, beginning with Su hearing Ora's voice in her dreams through radio waves. Meanwhile, Kazuhiko and Gingetsu attend one of Ora's performances, and Su sings along in her greenhouse, wishing to meet Ora. Against the Wizards' orders to keep Su isolated, Ko allows her to use radio waves to call Ora, who talks about music and love. They co-write the song "CLOVER," but on the night of Ora's birthday, she tells Su that she is a one-leaf Clover and going to die soon. As she predicted, Ora is shot by a sniper while performing the song, to which Kazuhiko resigns from the military to dedicate himself to finding the perpetrator.

The story then flashes back again to approximately two years before Ora's assassination. Gingetsu is ordered by the Wizards to track down C, a three-leaf Clover who escaped from the research facility and abandoned his brother, A. Gingetsu brings a defiant C to his residence and reports to the Wizards, who are intent on keeping the higher Clovers under their control, and believe C will not live long outside of captivity. In a call with General Shu, C refuses to return to the facility even though it endangers his lifespan, recalling that A is emotionally unstable and has already killed their brother B, the third three-leaf. General Shu agrees that it is best to keep C away from A and entrusts Gingetsu with C's care. However, A appears in Gingetsu's residence and tries to kill them both, but C intervenes and parts ways with his brother for good. Realizing that combining his power with C's could usurp the Wizards, Gingetsu implants a kill device in his head that the Wizards can activate if anything happens to him or the remaining three-leafs. Shu accepts Gingetsu's condition, adding that C will age rapidly outside the facility, and that he will likely only live for another five years.

Gingetsu gives C a new name, Ran, and introduces him to Kazuhiko. All the while, Su has been using her powers to eavesdrop on Ran since his escape from the facility. She remains trapped in the greenhouse, hoping one day she can be "reborn" like him.

== Characters ==
Kazuhiko Fay Ryu (琉・F(フェイ)・和彦, Ryū Fei Kazuhiko)

A former soldier and deputy commander. He left the military after the death of his lover, Ora, and is indebted to General Ko for saving him from several court-martials. He lost his right hand in a fight with Bols and currently wears a prosthetic, which is fitted with technology that allows him to conjure magical armaments. At Ko's behest, Kazuhiko is ordered to fulfill Su's wish of being escorted to Fairy Park. Along the way, he discovers that Su frequently communicated with Ora before her death, hence his selection to be her escort.

Su (スウ, Sū)

The only known four-leaf Clover who desires happiness in a "true Elsewhere." Her name is stated to be derived from Sì, meaning "four" in Chinese. When Su was four years old, her parents gave her to the military research facility in exchange for money, and since then she has lived alone in a birdcage-like greenhouse. She is monitored by the Wizards, who fear that if she becomes emotionally attached to another person, she could be used as a weapon to conquer the world. Before meeting Kazuhiko, she used her powers to communicate with Ora, whom she grew very attached do despite never meeting face-to-face. Su keeps her four-leaf ranking a secret until Kazuhiko brings her to Fairy Park, where she divulges the truth to him before committing suicide.

Gingetsu (銀月)

A lieutenant colonel and two-leaf Clover, formerly Kazuhiko's superior officer. Despite their formal differences, Gingetsu and Kazuhiko are very close friends outside of work. He lives with his partner, Ran, whom he took in two years ago with the Wizards' permission.

Ran (藍)

A three-leaf Clover and Gingetsu's partner. Originally named C (ツェー, Tsē), he lived in the military research facility with his identical brothers A (アー, Ā) and B (ベー, Bē). Since they were never told of Su's existence, the triplets believed themselves to be the strongest Clovers in the world. As three-leafs, C and his brothers have very short lifespans and age rapidly outside the research facility. At some point, A became mentally unstable and killed B out of a desire to keep C all to himself. As depicted in Volumes 3–4, C escaped captivity to separate himself from A and was taken in by Gingetsu, who gave him the name Ran. Living outside the facility causes Ran to age from a child to a young adult in just two years.

General Ko (紘将軍, Kō Shōgun)

A member of the Wizards involved in the Clover Leaf Project. She is shown to be very compassionate, having gotten Kazuhiko out of many court-martials, and allowed Su to develop an interest in the outside world by talking to Ora.

Bols (白豹(バルス), Barusu)

A member of the Azaiean Army's intelligence special forces who condescendingly calls Kazuhiko his "dear prince." He is described as a sadist for wielding swords that emit shockwaves, and for keeping Kazuhiko's severed hand in his room as a trophy.

Ora (織葉, Oruha)

Kazuhiko's deceased lover who sang at live venues, but was not well-known while she was alive. She was a one-leaf Clover whose only power was knowing the day she would die, and therefore was dismissed from the Clover Leaf Project as a child. On the night of her birthday, Ora performed the song she composed with Su and was shot dead in front of Kazuhiko. This prompted Kazuhiko to leave the military and seek help from underground agents to track down Ora's killer.

== Development ==
The manga was conceived as a four-part story. The first two volumes comprise part I and trace the main story in the present. The following two volumes are parts II and III, and are flashbacks which explain the history behind certain incidents. According to series head writer Nanase Ohkawa, two further books are needed to complete the story.

== Release ==
Clover was serialized in Kodansha's Amie from 1997 until the magazine's demise in 1999, and remains unfinished. Kodansha collected the chapters into four volumes. The first was published on June 6, 1997; the final was released on August 9, 1999. Kodansha re-released the series in two volumes on July 17, 2008.

Clover was licensed for an English-language release in North America by Tokyopop. It published the series from May 15, 2001, to March 20, 2002, but let the series go out of print on May 2, 2005. Dark Horse Manga picked up the license, combining the series into one volume (ISBN 1-59582-196-1) in its original right-to-left format and releasing it on May 13, 2009. The series is also licensed in French by Pika Édition, and in German by Carlsen Comics.

After Dark Horse Comics' license expired, Kodansha Comics licensed it and began releasing the series, combining into one hardcover volume in 2020.

=== Volume list ===
No.	Original release date	Original ISBN	North American release date	North American ISBN
01	June 6, 1997	978-4063400014	May 15, 2001	978-1-892213-66-2
001. "A Leaf" (葉, Ha); 002. "Tiny Wings in the Forest" (森の中の小さな翼, Mori no Naka no Chiisana Tsubasa); 003. "The Singing Waif" (歌う少女, Utau Shōjo); 004. "Birdcage" (鳥籠, Torikago); 005. "A Maze" (迷路, Meiro); 006. "The Cat" (猫, Neko); 007. "A Radio" (ラジオ, Rajio); 008. "A Trace" (跡, Ato); 009. "A Debt" (借り, Kari); 010. "A Flower" (花, Hana); 011. "Parliament" (議会, Gikai); 012. "Clover" (クローバー, Kurōbā); 013. "A Telephone" (電話, Denwa); 014. "Winged Fish that Flies Through the Night" (夜の空を飛ぶ羽のはえた魚, Yoru no Sora o Tobu Hane no haeta Sakana); 015. "A Leopard" (豹, Hyō); 016. "Back Alley" (路地裏, Rojiura); 017. "The Scar" (傷痕, Kizuato); 018. "A Song" (歌, Uta); 019. "Nonexistent" (あるはずのない, Aru hazu no nai); 020. "Goodnight" (おやすみ, O-yasumi); 021. "Pursuit" (追跡, Tsuiseki); 022. "Feathers" (羽根, Hane)
02	August 22, 1997	978-4063400021	September 11, 2001	978-1-892213-94-5
023. "Whiteout" (ホワイトアウト, Howaitoauto); 024. "The One and Not the Same" (おなじだけどおなじじゃない, Onaji dakedo onaji ja nai); 025. "Night" (夜, Yoru); 026. "About Me" (わたしのこと, Watashi no koto); 027. "Memory" (記憶, Kioku); 028. "The Vehicle" (移動装置, Norimono); 029. "The Destination" (たどりついた場所, Tadoritsuita Basho); 030. "Fairy Park" (妖精遊園地, Fearī Pāku); 031. "Three Leaf" (三つ葉, Mitsuba); 032. "Mind" (こころ, Kokoro); 033. "Pegasus" (天馬, Tenma); 034. "Shadow Play" (影絵, Kage-e); 035. "Homicidal Intent" (殺意, Satsui); 036. "Finale" (最後の, Saigo no); 037. "Change" (変わる, Kawaru); 038. "And Then" (そして, Soshite); 039. "Heart" (心, Kokoro); 040. "The Leaf" (葉, Ha)
03	May 13, 1998	978-4063400182	November 20, 2001	978-1-892213-95-2
041. "Inside a Dream, a Fairy's Dream" (夢の中の妖精の夢, Yume no Naka no Yōsei no Yume); 042. "Ora" (織葉, Oruha); 043. "Bird's Nest Backstage" (楽屋裏の小鳥の巣, Gakuya Ura no Kotori no Su); 044. "Bird's Nest in a Gilded Cage" (籠の中の小鳥の巣, Kago no Naka no Kotori no Su); 045. "Flower of Reunion" (再会の花, Saikai no Hana); 046. "Bug Eye" (虫の目, Mushi no Me); 047. "Alone" (ひとり, Hitori); 048. "Two" (ふたり, Futari); 049. "I Can Hear" (きこえる, Kikoeru); 050. "The Beginning" (はじまる, Hajimaru); 051. "Duet No One Knows" (誰も知らない二重唱, Dare mo Shiranai Dyuetto); 052. "Fish Eye" (魚の目, Sakana no Me); 053. "Deceit" (嘘, Uso); 054. "Call from Bird to Bird" (小鳥から小鳥への電話, Kotori kara Kotori e no Denwa); 055. "Gift from Bird to Bird" (小鳥に贈られる小鳥, Kotori ni Okurareru Kotori); 056. "Contact" (接触, Fureai); 057. "Cat's Eye" (猫の目, Neko no Me); 058. "Promise" (約束, Yakusoku); 059. "Onstage" (舞台, Sutēji); 060. "A Bird's Secret" (小鳥の内緒話, Kotori no Naishobanashi); 061. "Rain" (雨, Ame); 062. "A Song for One" (たった一人のためにうたう歌, Tatta Hitori no tame ni utau Uta); 063. "Bird's Eye" (鳥の目, Tori no Me); 064. "Bird in the Heart of a Bird" (小鳥の心の小鳥, Kotori no Kokoro no Kotori); 065. "How Do You Do?" (はじめまして, Hajimemashite); 066. "A Song Two Birds Make" (小鳥と小鳥が作る歌, Kotori to Kotori ga Tsukuru Uta); 067. "The Secret Bird Song" (小鳥たちの内緒の歌, Kotori-tachi no Naisho no Uta); 068. "The Duet Only Birds Know" (小鳥だけが知ってる二重唱, Kotori dake ga Shitteru Dyuetto); 069. "The Night That Does Not Go" (消えない夜, Kienai Yoru); 070. "A Secret Between Birds" (小鳥と小鳥の秘密, Kotori to Kotori no Himitsu); 071. "Clover" (CLOVER, Kurōbā); 072. "Man's Eye" (人の目, Hito no Me); 073. "Bird's Tear" (小鳥の涙, Kotori no Namida); 074. "A Bird for a Bird Gone" (居なくなった小鳥のための小鳥, Inakunatta Kotori no tame no Kotori); 075. "A Bird That a Bird Made" (小鳥の作った小鳥, Kotori no Tsukutta Kotori)
04	August 9, 1999	978-4063400342	March 20, 2002	978-1-892213-96-9
076. "Four-Leaf Clover" (四つ葉のクローバー, Yotsuba no Kurōbā); 077. "Three-Leaf Clover" (三つ葉のクローバー, Mitsuba no Kurōbā); 078. "Singing Voice" (歌う声, Utau Koe); 079. "Heard Voice" (聞こえる声, Kikoeru Koe); 080. "Calling Sound" (呼ぶ音, Yobu Oto); 081. "Communication" (通信, Tsūshin); 082. "A Promise" (約束, Yakusoku); 083. "Blood" (血, Chi); 084. "Alone" (一人, Hitori); 085. "The Hunted" (追われる者, Owarerumono); 086. "The Hunter" (追う者, Ōmono); 087. "The Line" (線, Sen); 088. "Reaction" (反応, Hannō); 089. "Spider Web" (蜘蛛の巣, Kumo no Su); 090. "A Song From a Bird to Watch Over Me" (見守る小鳥の歌, Mimamoru Kotori no Uta); 091. "A Place to Return to" (帰る場所, Kaeru Basho); 092. "Rain" (雨, Ame); 093. "Five" (5); 094. "Four" (4); 095. "Three" (3); 096. "Trust" (信頼, Shinrai); 097. "Duty" (任務, Ninmu); 098. "Seal" (印, Shirushi); 099. "A Wish" (願い, Negai); 100. "The Bliss of Clover" (クローバーのしあわせ, Kurōbā no Shiawase); 101. "Hair and Caresses" (髪と睦言, Kami to Mutsugoto); 102. "Mirror and Touch" (鏡と接触, Kagami to Sesshoku); 103. "Irritation" (苛立ち, Iradachi); 104. "I Want to See What I Don't See" (分からないから分かりたい, Wakaranai kara Wakaritai); 105. "A Song Sung for Everyone" (みんなにうたう歌, Minna ni utau Uta); 106. "A Song for a Couple" (ふたりできく歌, Futari de kiku Uta); 107. "A Song Sung for One" (ひとりでうたう歌, Hitori de utau Uta); 108. "Anger" (怒り, Ikari); 109. "Outside the Window" (窓の外, Mado no Soto); 110. "Be Careful" (気を付けて, Ki o Tsukete); 111. "Farewell" (別れ, Wakare); 112. "Tears" (涙, Namida); 113. "Two Leaf" (二葉, Futaba); 114. "Being Reborn" (生まれ変わる, Umarekawaru); 115. "C→R" (C➪R, Tsē➪Ran); 116. "Me, Too" (私も, Watashi mo)

== Media ==
A Clover animated music video based on the prologue chapters of the manga was produced by Bandai Visual and Madhouse Studios and shown in Japanese theaters before the Cardcaptor Sakura film in 1999. It is directed by Kitarō Kōsaka, with Nobuteru Yūki designing the characters and Ichiko Hashimoto composing the music. The short film was released to DVD as part of the Clamp in Wonderland collection on October 26, 2007.

Dark Horse Comics, who previously held the license for the distribution of the English North American edition of the manga, were in negotiations with Universal Studios for the rights to develop a film based upon the manga. However, as of 2022, nothing from this has materialized.

== Reception ==
Rika Takahashi, from EX: The Online World of Manga, noted the work's stark contrast with other, more positive CLAMP works such as Cardcaptor Sakura and Wish. She stated that it was a fast-pace drama similar to works such X and Tokyo Babylon. She commented on CLAMP's choice of presenting the story in short sequences and in a style "where the frames break out of the typical 'grid'" and to produce an experience of watching a movie on paper. She also commented that the typesetting of the sound effects helped create the overall cold mood unlike other CLAMP works. Furthermore, she praised the work for retaining a high detail of the art without being too dense.

Kisei from Tokidoki Journal praised Clover for having a sense of beauty due to its empty space and simplicity, which help give the manga and characters a mood of "chilling isolation," a stark contrast from CLAMP's previous works which Kisei said feature highly detailed pages that make reading difficult and "cheerful bubbly" female protagonists. Kisei further praised the work for, instead of defining the characters, using art to express their personalities and traits. Further praising it as a work that would draw both female and male audiences with its romance and military aspects, Kisei stated that the only flaw with the work was its high price.

Casey Brienza of Anime News Network remarks that the series is "arguably the best artwork of CLAMP's career" and has "gorgeous production values" but that "pretentious poetry conceals a thin plot and even thinner characterization."

A Publishers Weekly review felt that reading the series is like, "looking into a dystopic future through one tiny, perfectly square frame." The same reviewer said that the character designs were "magnificent" and that, "the tiny details on the clockwork birds and imaginative effects are stunning." The reviewer felt that though it was obviously an experimental work for CLAMP, that the series would be widely liked.
