= Legend of Chun Hyang =

Manga

- The bunko version of the manga featuring Mong Ryong (left) and Chun Hyang (right)

新・春香伝 (Shin Shunka-den)
- Genre: Adventure, Fantasy, Historical
- Manga
- Written by: Clamp
- Published by: Hakusensha
- English publisher: NA: Tokyopop (former)
- Magazine: Serie Mystery Special
- Original run: October 20, 1992 – February 20, 1994
- Volumes: 1

Legend of Chun Hyang (Japanese: 新・春香伝, Hepburn: Shin Shunka-den) is a manga by Clamp. Its story and characters are loosely based on a well known Korean folktale of the same name.

Shin Shunkaden was first published in 1996 by Hakusensha in Japan.

The project was dropped after three chapters, but Tokyopop licensed the manga in English as The Legend of Chun Hyang and released it in 2004.

== Plot ==
The story follows Chun Hyang (춘향), the spirited, beautiful, yet headstrong daughter of a mudang in a Korean village. Her name means "spring fragrance" (the shun-ka in the original Japanese title; Chinese: Chūn-Xiāng). A master of martial arts, Chun Hyang rises to the occasion when the Yangban, a tyrannical warlord, takes control of her village. He tried to kidnap one of her friends despite Chun Hyang's bold nature and formidable abilities, but there is little hope of freeing her village unless the amhaeng'eosa, a secret Korean government agent, arrives and catches the Ryanban in the act of abusing his powers.

When Mong Ryong, a somewhat lecherous but enchantingly handsome traveler appears, and apparently has fallen heads over heels with Chun Hyang, she reluctantly accepts his help to rescue her mother, who has been captured by the Ryanban.

Unfortunately, they are too late; Chun Hyang's mother has already killed herself to preserve her honor. Mong Ryong reveals himself the amhaeng'eosa and passes judgment on the Ryanban, though remains rueful that he could not do so before Wall Mae's death. Devastated, Chun Hyang does not know what else to do with her life, but Mong Ryong asks her to continue traveling with him. She agrees and they continue on, meeting many more people.

== Characters ==
- Chun Hyang Chun'yan (春香)

Chun Hyang is a free-spirited, beautiful yet headstrong daughter of Myonfa. She is 14 years old and she is extremely good in martial arts. She is very protective of her mother and her father has died when she was young.

- Wol Mae Myonfa (明華)

She is Chun Hyang's mother and respected and renown Mudang (shaman) in the town Chun Hyang lives in.

- Mong Ryong Muron (夢龍)

A handsome traveler who flirts with women, including Chun Hyang, much to her displeasure.

== Development ==
Clamp—a creative team consisting of Satsuki Igarashi, Nanase Ohkawa, Tsubaki Nekoi and Mokona—wrote and illustrated the Legend of Chun Hyang, after receiving a request for a mystery series that did not necessarily have to be a detective story. Ohkawa had been familiar with the original Korean folktale since kindergarten. The group had obtained some Korean books while in Osaka, and after reading the folktale, Ohkawa wanted to create a manga based on it. As the original heroine of the folktale represented an ideal, "faithful wife" and did not really appeal to Ohkawa, the group thought that it would not translate well into a manga; they gave their Chun Hyang a different personality, with her mother's being more faithful to the original. The group felt that the second chapter was more accurate than the first, after they had worn traditional Korean clothing and obtained reference material.

The first chapter was illustrated with a brush, after the group had experimented with the technique for their supernatural manga Shirahime-Syo (1992), although they found it difficult to convey the background during scenes of magic. As the second chapter was illustrated with a magic marker, the group had wanted to redraw the first chapter for the bound-volume release, but ultimately decided against it. The series ended prematurely after the manga magazine it was being serialized in was discontinued, although the group expressed an interest in continuing it.

== Media ==
=== Manga ===
Written and illustrated by Clamp, the chapters of Legend of Chun Hyang appeared as a periodic serial in the manga magazine Serie Mystery Special, beginning on October 20, 1992. The next chapter appeared on August 20, 1993, and the last chapter appeared on February 20, 1994. Hakusensha compiled the chapters into a bound volume and published it on December 15, 1996.

In 2003, Tokyopop announced that it had licensed Legend of Chun Hyang for an English-language translation in North America, and published it on August 10, 2004. In late May 2011, Tokyopop's North American publishing branch ceased operations, with all of its Japanese manga licenses returned. The manga has also been translated into French by Glėnat.

=== Audio drama ===
There was a drama CD released in 1994. The script for the drama CD was written by CLAMP.

- Release date: November 30, 1994

The cast are:

- Chun Hyang - Yuri Shiratori
- Myonfa - Yūko Nagashima
- Mong Ryong - Ryōtarō Okiayu
- Hyantan - Masako Ikeda
- Ryanban - Mugihito
- Ryanban's son - Nobuo Tobita

There was also a CD single released in Japan and the song was also included in the CLAMPAZAR Limited Edition Soundtrack.

Kōjin (行人)
Lyrics by: Nanase Ohkawa
Arrangement and composition: Kazuhiko Tōyama
Song by: Eiko Yamane

== Reception and legacy ==
It placed 58th on the list of the top 100 bestselling graphic novels for July 2004, with 1,629 copies sold.

Liann Cooper of Anime News Network reviewed Legend of Chun Hyang positively, writing that its humor and art was characteristic of Clamp. In his review for Kliatt, George Galuschak praised the manga as "high quality", with well-done artwork and "simple and moving" plots which centered around "honor and sacrifice".

=== Crossovers ===
Chun Hyang or Chun'yan appears in several episodes of the anime Tsubasa: Reservoir Chronicle. Her counterpart is a girl whose mother was also a Mu Dang and killed by the Ryanban's sorceress. The Ryanban and his son appear, though they are much different from their respective counterparts in The Legend of Chun Hyang.

Chun'yan appears as a primary character in the country of Koryo and then makes cameo appearances as a contestant in the Dragonfly Race in Piffle World, piloting the Renhi (Lotus Princess) racer. In the anime adaption, she makes an additional cameo as a student in a world where everyone is a chibi character.
