= Clamp in Wonderland =

Anthology anime series produced by CLAMP

Clamp in Wonderland is a series of animated music videos produced by Clamp, a creative team made up by Satsuki Igarashi, Nanase Ohkawa, Tsubaki Nekoi (formerly Mick Nekoi) and Mokona (formerly Mokona Apapa).

The short films feature characters from the group's entire canon of work. The first spans Clamp's career from their beginnings until the year 1994. The sequel Clamp in Wonderland 2 includes over 100 characters from the Clamp universe.

The videos were released to DVD on October 26, 2007, as Clamp in Wonderland 1&2 1989–2006 (BCBA-3143).

Clamp in Wonderland features characters created between 1989 and 1994 and Clamp in Wonderland 2 features characters created between 1995 and 2006.

== Production ==
- Original concept/Original character design: Clamp
- Planning: Nanase Ohkawa
- Producer: Satsuki Igarashi
- Production producer: Masaki Sawanobori, Kazuhiko Ikekuchi, Masao Maruyama
- Storyboard: Mokona Apapa, Mick Nekoi
- Director: Morio Asaka
- Character design/Art director: Kumiko Takahashi
- Music production: Clamp Co., Ltd.
- In collaboration with: Clamp Research Department, Clamp Research Department's Secretarial Office, Shelty Co., Ltd.
- Production: Animate/Madhouse Studios

== Theme songs ==
=== Opening theme ===
- Anata Dake no WONDERLAND (あなただけのWONDERLAND)
  - Lyricist: Nanase Ohkawa
  - Song: Junko Hirotani

=== Ending theme ===
- Anata ga Shiawase de Aru You ni (『あなた』が『幸せ』であるように)
  - Lyricist: Nanase Ohkawa
  - Song: Junko Hirotani

== Clamp in Wonderland 2 ==
Featured characters created between 1995 and 2006.

=== Production ===
- Original creator: Clamp
- Planning: Nanase Ohkawa
- Director: Clamp
- Producer: Mitsuyuki Masuhara
- Opening storyboard: Mokona
- Ending storyboard: Tsubaki Nekoi
- Character designer/Animation director (Opening): Hiromi Katō
- Animation director (Ending): Yoshinori Kanemori
- Color setting: Naoko Kodama
- Art director: Akemi Konno
- Director of photography: Yuki Hama
- Editing: Kashiko Kimura
- Animation production: MADHOUSE
- General producer: PYROTECHNIST

=== Theme songs ===
==== Opening theme ====
- action! by Maaya Sakamoto
  - Composer: h-wonder
  - Lyrics: Maaya Sakamoto

==== Ending theme ====
- Oh YEAH! by Round Table feat. Nino

== Soundtrack ==
Clamp in Wonderland 1&2 1989–2006 Theme Song Collection (VTCL-60003) was released on October 24, 2007.

== Clamp in Wonderland EX ==
Clamp in Wonderland EX is a omake style short manga series published in different magazines. Each chapter involves characters from xxxHolic and another CLAMP manga.

White
Yuko Ichihara sends Kimihiro Watanuki, Black Mokona, and Shizuka Dōmeki out to buy sake late at night. Watanuki is annoyed with Dōmeki accompanying him, but Mokona tells him Dōmeki's presence is necessary as there have been many signs of bad luck and spirits around. They run into plushies, including Ioryogi and Ushagi-san, playing mahjong. Watanuki enrages Ioryogi by rejecting the invitation to join the game, but Watanuki is saved when Sakura and White Mokona appear from a manhole. Sakura joins the mahjong game and continues to win with one lucky hand after another. At the shop, Yuko complains that Watanuki and Mokona still have not returned. The comic was originally published in CLAMP Newtype [white] in 2006.
Platinum
Fuma Monou is about to impale Kamui Shiro with a sacred sword, when Kamui suddenly appears in Yuko Ichihara's shop, where he is found by Watanuki. Yuko notes that Kamui seems troubled, but he is unable to articulate that he has too many things distressing him. He finally settles on his friend (Fuma) has become weird and is trying to kill him. As Yuko suggests the price for her to grant Kamui's wish would be the entire earth, Fuma appears at the shop, stating that he is the only one who can grant Kamui's wish. As Kamui and Fuma begin to fight, Watanuki comments that Kamui really does have a lot of problems. The comic was originally published in CLAMP Newtype [platinum] in 2006.
Pastel
Kobato Hanato appears in the storeroom of Yuko's shop, where Watanuki is cleaning. She enthusiastically offers to help him with housework to heal Watanuki's heart, but her clumsiness causes more problems than actually assisting him. As Kobato apologizes for failing to help Watanuki, he gives her some homemade cookies and thanks her kindly. Kobato leaves the shop happily and decides that she needs to work harder like Watanuki, but is immediately berated by Ioryogi because she failed to heal Watanuki. The comic was originally published in CLAMP Newtype [pastel] in 2008.
Kindai Mahjong
Kazahaya Kudo bemoans losing all his money at mahjong again and being forced to buy beer for everyone else at the Green Drugstore. He ends up at Yuko's shop, where he is greeted by Watanuki, and wishes to become very good at mahjong. Mokona offers to teach him and Yuko gives Kazahaya an "Akagi Mahjong Set". Yuko assures him that he will have the luck of a god if he uses the Akagi tiles, but warns him that he will die if he tries to win using the Chu Ren Pou Tou combination. Kazahaya returns to the Green Drugstore and enters a winning streak, but becomes conflicted when he ends up with a Chu Ren Pou Tou hand as he is about to win a game that will clear all his debts. However, he has incurred too many penalties during the games that will add to his existing debts. At the shop, Yuko reveals to Watanuki that obtaining Chu Ren Pou Tou won't result in an actual death, the story is that the person will be attacked by debt collectors and the hand is otherwise considered very lucky in China. She had only told Kazahaya that he would die "because it would be fun." The comic was originally published in Kindai Mahjong in 2008.
