= Mitsuyuki Masuhara =

Japanese anime film director (born 1973)

- 増原 光幸
- Born: December 5, 1973 (age 52); Kariya, Aichi, Japan
- Occupation: Film director
- Years active: 1999–present

Mitsuyuki Masuhara (増原 光幸, Masuhara Mitsuyuki) is a Japanese anime film director. He joined the company Madhouse since 1999. Masuhara served as the episode director, before directing the short film Clamp in Wonderland 2 in 2007 and becoming a full series director on Chi's Sweet Home in 2008.

== Filmography ==
=== Television series ===
- Chi's Sweet Home (2008) - Director
- Chi's Sweet Home: Chi's New Address (2009) - Director
- Kobato (2009–2010) - Director
- Blade (2011) - Director
- Shirokuma Cafe (2012) - Director
- Ace of Diamond (2013–2016) - Director
- Okko's Inn (2018) - Director
- Ace of Diamond Act II (2019–2020) - Director
- The Dinner Table Detective (2025) - Director

=== OVAs ===
- Clamp in Wonderland 2 (2007) - Director
