= Miyuki-chan in Wonderland =

Manga

- The English-language cover as published by Tokyopop in North America, depicting Miyuki

不思議の国の美幸ちゃん (Fushigi no Kuni no Miyuki-chan)
- Genre: Fantasy; Isekai; Sex comedy; Yuri
- Manga
- Written by: Clamp
- Published by: Kadokawa Shoten
- English publisher: NA: Tokyopop (formerly) Viz Media
- Imprint: Kadokawa Comics Ace
- Magazine: Newtype
- Original run: 1993 – 1995
- Volumes: 1
- Original video animation
- Directed by: Seiko Sayama; Mamoru Hamatsu
- Produced by: Masao Maruyama; Kazuhiko Ikeguchi
- Written by: Nanase Ohkawa
- Music by: Toshiyuki Honda
- Studio: Animate Film; Madhouse (cooperation)
- Licensed by: NA: ADV Films
- Released: June 21, 1995
- Episodes: 2

Miyuki-chan in Wonderland (Japanese: 不思議の国の美幸ちゃん, Hepburn: Fushigi no Kuni no Miyuki-chan) is a comedy yuri manga written and illustrated by Clamp, an all-female manga artist team consisting of Satsuki Igarashi, Mokona, Tsubaki Nekoi, and Nanase Ohkawa. The story focuses on the eponymous protagonist, a Japanese high-school girl who finds herself pulled into various worlds populated by women who consider her appealing.

Miyuki-chan in Wonderland appeared as a serial in the manga magazine Newtype from 1993 to 1995, based on the 1865 children's novel Alice's Adventures in Wonderland by Lewis Carroll. Kadokawa Shoten collected the seven chapters into one bound volume and published it in September 1995. While the concept of Miyuki-chan in Wonderland was initially imagined as the first chapter by writer Ohkawa, the team continued with it for the enjoyment it provided. An image album and an original video animation adaptation of the first two chapters were published in 1995.

In 2002, Tokyopop announced that it had licensed Miyuki-chan in Wonderland for an English-language translation, and published it in October 2003. It is now out of print. It received a range of critical reaction from reviewers, from praise as cute entertainment to criticism as the worst of Clamp's works. The eponymous protagonist has made cameo appearances in other works by Clamp: the music video Clamp in Wonderland (1994) Clamp School Detectives (1997), and the fantasy manga series Tsubasa: Reservoir Chronicle (2003–2009). Viz Media acquired the rights to the manga and digitally published it on September 24, 2014.

== Plot ==
Miyuki-chan in Wonderland consists of seven independent chapters linked together by the eponymous protagonist.

- "Miyuki-chan in Wonderland (不思議の国の美幸ちゃん, Fushigi no Kuni no Miyuki-chan): While rushing to high school, Miyuki sees a skateboarding playboy bunny, and falls down a rabbit hole. There she meets various women who find her attractive, and panicking, awakens from her dream. However, as she runs to school, the woman skateboards past her again.
- "Miyuki-chan in Looking Glass Land" (鏡の国の美幸ちゃん, Kagami no Kuni no Miyuki-chan): While combing her hair in front of a mirror, Miyuki finds herself kissed by her reflection and pulled into the mirror, where she meets women who find her attractive. Fleeing from them, she eventually returns to her bedroom.
- "Miyuki-chan in TV Land" (テレビの中の美幸ちゃん, Terebi no Naka no Miyuki-chan): Miyuki awakens to find that she has overslept and missed the television broadcast of the film Barbarella (1968). She is then pulled into the television by a pair of legs. Fleeing from the women who consider her attractive, Miyuki wakes up to see a pair of legs emerging from the television.
- "Miyuki-chan in Part-Time Job Land" (バイトの国の美幸ちゃん, Baito no Kuni no Miyuki-chan): Rushing to her part-time work at a diner, Miyuki finds a boxing ring, in which she is pitted against other restaurants' employees. She attempts to escape, only to be caught and blasted. She awakens, having bumped her head on the staff room door, and enters to find the boxing ring.
- "Miyuki-chan in Mah-Jongg Land" (麻雀の国の美幸ちゃん, Mājan no Kuni no Miyuki-chan): Miyuki reads a comic about mah-jongg, when three mah-jongg players appear to play strip mah-jongg with her. One reveals herself to be "Mah-Jongg Girl", a superheroine, and with her defeat, Miyuki takes her place. She eventually awakens.
- "Miyuki-chan in Video Game Land" (ゲームの国の美幸ちゃん, Gēmu no Kuni no Miyuki-chan): After failing to complete a video game, Miyuki accepts the video game's offer to take over as the heroine and is transported inside the game, where she meets women who find her attractive. Miyuki, however, dies inside the game, and the same game menu appears.
- "Miyuki-chan in X land" (X(エックス)の国の美幸ちゃん, X no Kuni no Miyuki-chan): While watching X in the film theater, Miyuki is swooped into the film, where its characters find her attractive. She awakens in the theater to find that she has now replaced its protagonist, to her shock.

== Development ==
Miyuki-chan in Wonderland was developed by Clamp—the all-female manga artist team consisting of Satsuki Igarashi, Mokona, Tsubaki Nekoi, and Nanase Ohkawa. Ohkawa conceived the concept of Miyuki-chan in Wonderland, which was supposed to serve as the first chapter. The team, however, decided to continue with the concept, as Ohkawa was fond of it and Mokona enjoyed illustrating the characters. The protagonist was illustrated with her school uniform, as that provided the team with more fan service opportunities during action scenes. In retrospective, the team felt that the manga acted as a showcase for Mokona's "sexy, female character designs", writing: "It was fun, but a little hentai."

== Media ==
=== Manga ===
Written and illustrated by Clamp, the seven chapters of Miyuki-chan in Wonderland appeared as a serial in the manga magazine Newtype from 1993 to 1995. Kadokawa Shoten published the chapters in one bound volume on September 10, 1995, and re-released it on May 1, 2001.

Tokyopop licensed Miyuki-chan in Wonderland for an English-language release in North America, and published it on October 5, 2003. It has since gone out of print. The manga has also been translated into other languages, such as Italian by Planet Manga, and German by Carlsen Verlag.

=== OVA ===
Directed by Seiko Sayama and Mamoru Hamazu, the original video animation (OVA) adaptation of the first two chapters of Miyuki-chan in Wonderland was released by Sony Music Entertainment on June 21, 1995. It was produced by Animate Film, with Toshiyuki Honda as the composer and Tetsuro Aoki as the designer. Ohkawa wrote the script for the adaptation. ADV Films licensed Miyuki-chan in Wonderland for a Region 1 release, and published it in May 2002.

=== Other ===
An image album based on Miyuki-chan in Wonderland was released on April 1, 1995, by Sony Music Entertainment.

== Reception and legacy ==
Miyuki-chan in Wonderland received a range of critical reaction. In Women in Science Fiction and Fantasy (2009), Eden Lee Lackner wrote that the manga's notability stems from "how it plays with textual boundaries"; for example, Miyuki travels through Clamp's adaptation of the fictional worlds of Alice in Wonderland and X. According to her, Miyuki's travels to X land serves as "characteristic" of Clamp's intersection of its characters and narratives from its different works. Writing for Sequential Tart, Sheena McNeil greatly enjoyed the manga, praising it as entertaining "fluff". Patrick King of Animefringe wrote that the illustrations contributed the most appeal to the plotless manga, with the inclusion of a bonus section and colored OVA concept-art pages praised as well. In contrast, Katherine Dacey, the former senior manga editor for PopCultureShock, described the manga as "the nadir of this talented quartet’s work" in her list of the ten worst manga. According to her, the "inane" short stories served as "just a pretext for CLAMP to draw scantily-clad beauties engaging in vaguely naughty behavior (usually making a pass at the vaguely horrified Miyuki or inviting her to play strip poker)." Mason Templar, writing in Manga: The Complete Guide (2007), similarly reviewed the manga, commenting that it was best viewed as an artbook. Erica Friedman, the founder of Yuricon, a lesbian-themed convention, and ALC Publishing, wrote that the settings were "loosely based on Lewis Carroll’s iconic works, games and Clamp’s own work." According to her, the manga lacked emotion and a true depiction of lesbians, only showing "fictitious female beings groping a fictitious female character".

The anime adaptation also received a range of reviews. Anime News Network's Christopher Macdonald recommended it as nonsensical entertainment, describing it as Clamp's tribute to Alice in Wonderland and its sequel Through the Looking Glass (1871). McNeil praised it as nicely animated entertainment, though it lacked developed characters and a plot. In his review of the anime adaptation, King concluded: "It's simply a showcase of some cute and sexy animation designed by CLAMP, no more, no less." He noted the absence of an English-language dub. Chris Beveridge of Mania Entertainment praised the character designs and voice acting, rating the anime C-. Another reviewer for Sequential Tart expressed her lukewarm feelings towards the anime, and wrote that it might appeal to fans of Clamp or art films. While praising the visuals and audio as helping to create a surreal atmosphere, Raphael See of THEM Anime Reviews, in contrast, wrote that the effect was ruined by the sexual nature of the plot; he recommended Dreams (1990) or Robot Carnival (1987) instead. In The Anime Encyclopedia: A Guide to Japanese Animation since 1917 (2001), Jonathan Clements and Helen McCarthy unfavorably reviewed the anime, describing it as "pointlessly kinky."

Miyuki has appeared in other works by Clamp. She appears in the video collection Clamp in Wonderland (1994), and makes a cameo appearance in the backgrounds of the fantasy manga series Tsubasa: Reservoir Chronicle (2003–2009).
