= Shirahime-Syo: Snow Goddess Tales =

Manga

- Cover of the English-language translation as published by Viz Media (2015)

白姫抄 (Shirahimeshō)
- Genre: Supernatural
- Manga
- Written by: Clamp
- Published by: Kobunsha; Kadokawa Shoten
- English publisher: NA: Tokyopop (former) Viz Media
- Published: June 10, 1992
- Volumes: 1

Shirahime-Syo: Snow Goddess Tales (Japanese: 白姫抄, Hepburn: Shirahimeshō) is a supernatural manga by Clamp, a manga artist group made up by Satsuki Igarashi, Nanase Ohkawa, Tsubaki Nekoi and Mokona. It consists of three short stories, framed by a man's encounter with the titular character in the snow. The character design of the title character originated in a postcard in the team's newsletters, and later appeared in a preview page in the March 1992 issue of Bar Pretty, when only the concept had been finalized. Completed on a "tight" schedule, the volume was published in June 1992 by Kobunsha, and re-released in August 2001 by Kadokawa Shoten.

Tokyopop licensed Shirahime-Syo for an English-language translation, and published it in hardcover in December 2004, with a softcover edition following it a half a year later. The collection was later digitally reprinted by Viz Media in January 2015. It has also been translated into other languages, such as French and German.

== Plot ==
Shirahime-Syo: Snow Goddess Tales opens with a man wandering in a blizzard. He encounters a woman who is waiting and after advising her to seek shelter, tells her the snow is the tears of the snow princess.

In "On Wolf Mountain" (牙狼の山, Garō no Yama), Fubuki, a young girl, sets out to seek revenge from the mysterious black wolf who killed her father. When the same wolf saves her from mountain dogs, she develops an attachment that complicates things with her family.

"The Ice Flower" (氷の花, Kōri no Hana) centers on a man, who leaves his lover, Kaya, waiting by a cold lake. He returns years later, believing she will have found someone else and grown old, and finds her frozen in the lake, unchanged from the day he left her.

In "Hiyoku no Tori" (比翼の鳥, Wings Side-by-side; "Happily Married Couple"), a soldier loses his way on a snowy mountainside while returning home to his fiancée. In his frustration, he shoots two herons, only to discover upon his eventual return home that they had been guiding him.

The manga concludes with a continuation of the opening scene. The woman reveals herself as Shirahime and before ascending with spirit wolves, replies that the snow is the tears of humans.

== Development ==
The all-female manga artist group Clamp began Shirahime-Syo after the editor of Kobunsha's manga magazine Bar Pretty requested that the group to make a manga for the company. Prior to that, the group had watched an episode of the television show Manga Japanese Legends, which had "impressed" them. A preview poster for the manga appeared in the March 1992 issue of Bar Pretty, the magazine's final one, depicting Shirahime. At that point, the characters and story type were undecided, although the concept had been determined. Shirahime's character design had been used earlier on a postcard in the group's newsletter; at the time, they had considered using the character in a future story dealing with folklore. They considered Shirahime not quite a yuki-onna, but more similar to the eponymous character of Osama Tezuka's manga Phoenix in that she was a vital supporting character "who exists separately outside the individual stories". Although the group lacked the time to research a time period for the costumes of the characters, the costume "trends" differed from chapter to chapter to evoke the sense that each chapter occurred in a different time period.

Due to the "tight" schedule, Clamp had ten days for the completion of the artwork. The art was done with a brush and ink, to evoke the atmosphere of a folktale and because the group lacked the time to ink the manga with a pen. Rough drafts were almost nonexistent. According to Mokona, they finished "everything up to the background" at one time, after the frames were finished. Diluted ink replaced screentones in the artwork, although this created time-consuming difficulties during the "plate-making process" as the group had to make sure that "the halftoning for the parts with diluted ink wouldn't be ruined." Mokona drew the calligraphy on the cover.

== Release ==
Shirahime-Syo was published by Kobunsha under their Haru Pretty imprint on June 10, 1992 (ISBN 4-334-80161-7). A re-release on Kadokawa Shoten's Asuka Comics DX line happened on August 1, 2001 (ISBN 4-04-853393-2).

In North America, Tokyopop licensed Shirahime-Syo: Snow Goddess Tales for an English-language translation. It published a hardcover edition on December 9, 2003, and a softcover edition on June 15, 2004. After Tokyopop returned the license following the closure of its North America publishing branch in 2011, Viz Media republished the manga digitally on January 13, 2015. It has also been translated into French by Glėnat, and German by Egmont Manga & Anime. In 2007, it was licensed in Indonesia by M&C Comics.

== Reception ==
In a retrospective piece on Clamp's works, Animefringe's Lesley Smith described Shirahime-Syo's short stories as "breathtakingly beautiful". Sequential Tart's Sheena McNeil enjoyed the collection, praising it as "both brilliant and beautiful"; she highlighted the "unique" artstyle and frame story.
