= Kobato =

Japanese manga series by Clamp

- First tankōbon volume cover, featuring Kobato Hanato and Ioryogi

こばと。
- Genre: Fantasy
- Manga
- Written by: Clamp
- Published by: Shogakukan (former); Kadokawa Shoten (current)
- English publisher: NA: Yen Press
- Magazine: Monthly Sunday Gene-X; (December 18, 2004 – August 19, 2005); Newtype; (October 10, 2006 – July 8, 2011)
- Original run: December 18, 2004 – July 8, 2011
- Volumes: 6
- Anime television series
- Directed by: Mitsuyuki Masuhara
- Written by: Michiko Yokote; Nanase Ohkawa
- Music by: Takeshi Hama
- Studio: Madhouse
- Licensed by: NA: Sentai Filmworks (expired)
- Original network: NHK-BS2
- English network: NA: Anime Network; PH: HERO, Yey!
- Original run: October 6, 2009 – March 23, 2010
- Episodes: 24
- icon

Kobato (こばと。) is a Japanese manga series by Clamp. It was first published in Shogakukan's seinen manga magazine Monthly Sunday Gene-X from December 2004 to August 2005, under the title Kobato (kari). It was later serialized in Kadokawa Shoten's Newtype magazine from October 2006 to July 2011. Its chapters were collected in six tankōbon volumes. The story features a mysterious young girl, Kobato Hanato, who works in a local kindergarten. In North America, the manga was first published by Newtype USA and later licensed by Yen Press. A 24-episode anime television series adaptation by Madhouse was broadcast from October 2009 to March 2010.

== Story ==
Kobato is a sweet, perky, cute yet naïve girl who has a contract: in order to be allowed to go to a certain place, she must fill a mysterious bottle with people's "healed hearts", but the condition is that she must do so before four seasons end. As Kobato attempts to fulfill her mission, she is accompanied by Ioryogi—a spirit in the form of a dog plushie. Because Ioryogi is the cause of a punishment imposed on him and his friends from the spirit world, he must guide Kobato and ensure that she succeeds in her mission; so that he and his friends might return to their true forms.

== Characters ==
Kobato Hanato (花戸 小鳩, Hanato Kobato)
Voiced by: Kana Hanazawa
A strange and naive girl with a kind heart, never wanting to see someone suffer or get hurt, and a heartfelt, enthusiastic, and sincere wish to help people in need. However, she is frequently clumsy, clueless, and rash, often tripping on her own feet, much to Ioryogi's annoyance.
Despite her role as the titular character, she is a bit of an enigma within the series, as her origins have yet to be explained. She seeks to heal the hearts of others, resulting in the filling up of a mysterious bottle called a "flask" with the suffering of those people's hearts so that someday she will be able to go to a certain place that she really wants to go. She seems to have no memories of her past. To achieve her goal, she works as an assistant alongside Kiyokazu at the Yomogi Nursery run by Sayaka Okiura.
However, Kobato has been forbidden from falling in love with anyone she heals the heart of and curiously she is not allowed to take off her hat in public. It is eventually revealed that the hat conceals a spiritual crown upon her head which represents her impending death. Kobato struggles through the series with her feelings for Kiyokazu and comes to realizes that she is in love with him. Unfortunately, Kobato is forced to pick between two options - complete her wish and never be with Kiyokazu or stay with him, keeping Ioryogi and the others trapped in animal form.
At the conclusion of the anime, it is revealed that Kobato died in the distant past. She exists in a liminal state where she is neither dead nor alive. In the end, when she finally fulfills her task to fill the flask, she is reborn without any memories of her past life until she meets Kiyokazu again few years later. In the manga, it is revealed that Kobato had died due to the war caused by Ioryogi and the gods. The angel that Ioryogi had fallen in love with felt pity for the girl who died before her time was up and transferred her soul into Kobato, being able to since they both have the same soul but belong to different worlds. The time limit Kobato has is the time before the angel disappears.
Ioryogi (いおりょぎ)
Voiced by: Tetsu Inada
Kobato's companion, who appears as a stuffed toy dog that she carries around. He's actually very foul-mouthed, short-tempered, and cruel, his features twisting horrifically when aggravated or enraged. He tends to scathingly criticize or hit Kobato for her naïveté and stupidity and often calls her "Dobato" (lit. Stupid Dove). Despite the lack of respect he shows Kobato, he will always acknowledge her efforts when he feels she deserves it, and seems to be set on helping Kobato achieve her goal. He is harsh to her and scolds her constantly but is seen to really care for her and comforts her in his own way when she is down, such as patting her head to encourage her. His real name is Iorogi (五百祇 (いおろぎ)), but has forced to respond to Ioryogi only because Kobato has been unable to pronounce his name correctly. Ioryogi was originally Tsubaki Nekoi's mascot, Iorogi, on Clamp's self caricatures.
His origin is still unknown (in the anime he comes from the Spirit Realm), but he can produce a powerful fiery blast from his mouth when offended, like when he protected Kobato from the perverted old man in an early chapter of Kobato, though he also often uses it on Kobato whenever she messes up. It has been heavily implied that his stuffed animal appearance is not his true form. Ioryogi's true form has yet to be revealed but several 'shadows' of his original form have been seen. One being that of a sinister, large, wolf like creature with horns, which manifested during one of Ioryogi's sparring matches with Ginsei. Another form appears to be a man with spiky hair and a long, battered looking cape or coat, manifesting when he watched over a sleeping Kobato. It is implied that Ioryogi's current form is a 'punishment' from causing some sort of serious trouble back in 'Heaven'. In the anime, it is mentioned that his punishment was for attempting to start a war with Heaven. The exact reason is still not clear but Ioryogi started the war for love. Being from the other world royal family, he was rude and careless and skipped an important meeting where the three worlds were meeting. He met an angel sitting in a tree and helped her out when she fell. In return, she sang for him a song so sweet, he instantly fell in love. In the manga it is then revealed the angel's name was Suishou, also that Kobato and Ioryogi's angel share the same soul because they are the same person belonging to two different worlds. When Kobato died, Ioryogi's angel used her power to bring her back to life. However, as a result, the angel will not be able to reincarnate. Ioryogi begged God to help him bring back his angel and came to an agreement: if "Kobato" is able to fill her flask with wounded hearts, then Kobato and the angel can live. If not, he would lose them both forever.
Kiyokazu Fujimoto (藤本 清和, Fujimoto Kiyokazu)
Voiced by: Tomoaki Maeno
A handsome, blunt and sarcastic young man working at the same kindergarten as Kobato. He is also Kobato's neighbor, living in the same complex under the ownership of Chitose. He has known Sayaka for many years and appears to care deeply for her, showing much concern over and being defensive of her. Upon first meeting Kobato, he is rather unkind and cold to her but eventually comes to accept her. He often shuts Kobato down but he also comes to respect her dedication and optimistic attitude. Kobato notes that he appears to be hiding some emotional pain of his own. He is named after Kiyokazu Fujimoto, the chief of the project department of Pyrotechnist, the company that works as Clamp's managing agent.
As a child, Kiyokazu was an orphan taken in by Sayaka's father and did not get along with his peers. He had been studying to become a lawyer, but stopped going to his college classes when it became apparent Sayaka's need for help had become increasingly desperate. He works at various part-time jobs throughout the day in order to help support the kindergarten, as he is attached to Sayaka and feels indebted to her family for taking care of him in his youth.
Near the end of the manga, he admits to Sayaka, "I always loved you." Sayaka remarks on his use of the past tense, and hugs him, telling him to go to "that girl" and "say the rest of it in the present tense." When Kobato is taken away by Ushagi, he cries, but his memories of Kobato immediately begin to disappear. He mutters, "I just lost something... something terribly precious." He is reunited with Kobato years later, when she is reborn and his memories of her return thanks to a wish that Ginsei makes to God. In contrast, at the conclusion of the anime series, he recovers his memories of her shortly after she disappears upon when her wish is fulfilled and is not reunited with her until an undisclosed period of time has passed. When Kobato regains her memories of him, Kiyokazu remarks, "You've kept me waiting so many years. You're late again," after which he embraces Kobato.
Sayaka Okiura (沖浦 清花, Okiura Sayaka)
Voiced by: Fumiko Orikasa
The teacher and principal of Yomogi Nursery, a local kindergarten where Kobato works. She has known Kiyokazu since he was seven, which is when her family adopted him. She also went to the same high school as Chitose. She is a kind and trusting person, willing to let Kobato assist her at the school even with Kiyokazu's obvious mistrust of her. Upon meeting Sayaka, Kobato wishes to heal the apparent emotional pain in her heart. Sayaka is in debt due to an event in the past involving her father; in spite of this she continues to try her best at keeping the school going. Sayaka was once married to Kazuto, the debt collector who frequently pesters her to close down the school. Despite having already divorced him, she and Kazuto still share the same surname - it is revealed that Kazuto took Sayaka's family name when they married to distance himself from his birth family.
Chitose Mihara (三原 千歳, Mihara Chitose)
Voiced by: Houko Kuwashima
The kind and generous landlady of Kobato's apartment and Sayaka's old classmate. She is married and has twin daughters, Chise and Chiho. Kiyokazu also lives in Chitose's apartment complex. She is a cross-over character from Chobits but not the same person, as the dimensional theorem of xxxHOLiC.
Chiho Mihara (三原 千帆, Mihara Chiho) and Chise Mihara (三原 千世, Mihara Chise)
Voiced by: Megumi Nakajima (both sisters)
Mihara Chitose's twin daughters, presumably age 11-12. Like their mother, they are crossover characters from Chobits, known in that series as Freya and Chī/Elda. In Kobato, they are normal girls and live with their mother and father. Like many children in the series, they are apparently very fond of Kobato. In the anime, while the two had helped Kobato find an owner for an abandoned kitten, the two had begun to remember how lonely they were. Kobato sings a song to cheer them up, and their hearts are healed.
Kazuto Okiura (沖浦 和斗, Okiura Kazuto)
Voiced by: Shinichiro Miki
A debt collector who appears at the end of the fifth chapter, a man who has some association with yakuza. He is noted in the series for smiling a lot and smoking. Kazuto appears to be responsible for the constant impending closure of Sayaka's kindergarten and is also Sayaka's ex-husband. He seems to enjoy pestering and aggravating Kiyokazu, the latter whom despises him for hurting Sayaka in the past. He seems to have developed an interest in Kobato following his first meeting with her. Despite his cheerful and collected nature, he has shown hints of a slightly more sinister side, possibly due to his yakuza background. Kazuto seems to show what may or may not be some genuine concern for Sayaka, despite his continuous threats to close down the school. In the anime, it is revealed that he in fact loved and still loves Sayaka and acts as the bad guy to protect her, because if he does not, then his father, who was the actually culprit behind putting Sayaka's father in debt, would have used more forceful means to get the kindergarten. Kiyokazu later finds out and tells Sayaka, and asks her to make amends with him. In the end of series, he and Sayaka reconcile and he is shown to be helping out at the nursery.
Ginsei (銀生)
Voiced by: Daisuke Namikawa
A mysterious creature who wears an eyepatch whom shares a history with Ioryogi. His appearance seems to be a rabbit crossed with a wolf. He now appears to be on poor terms with him, and often challenges him to fights. Ginsei also has frequently stated that Ioryogi's current form is not his true form and also seems to be aware of Kobato's mission. He does not think highly of Kobato or Ioryogi's relationship with Kobato, though he gradually becomes more sympathetic towards her. It is implied that he wants Ioryogi to return to 'Heaven' for unknown reasons, as it was Ioryogi who took Ginsei in and trained him. In fact, it has been mentioned that Ioryogi was the one who gave Ginsei his name. Ginsei's appearance, like Ioryogi's, is implied to not be his actual form as when he stands atop a building overlooking Ioryogi and Kobato's apartment, his shadow is that of a young man with short hair. He is from the other world.
Genko (玄琥)
Voiced by: Rikiya Koyama
Ioryogi's acquaintance. A bear that runs a baumkuchen (European cake) shop in the middle of the woods in another dimension. One has to walk through the narrow space between the wall and a specific street light pole in order to have access to that dimension. Like Ioryogi, his current name, form and job are not his real ones. Ginsei reveals that Genko is an aristocrat from the other world. By Ioryogi's request, Genko will use his information-gathering skills to find out the whereabouts of Yomogi Nursery School and its employees.
Zuishō (瑞祥)
A cheerful and talkative messenger who has taken the form of a bird, but often falls victim to Ioryogi's capriciousness.
Takashi Domoto (堂元 崇, Dōmoto Takashi)
Voiced by: Hiroshi Kamiya
A friend of Kiyokazu, a polite young man. Takashi has been friends with Kiyokazu since middle school and has been concerned that Kiyokazu has dropped out of college in order to help Yomogi Kindergarten. In the anime, it is implied that he fell in love with Kobato, but after he realized that Kobato is in love with Kiyokazu, he let go of her. During the last scenes of the anime, he is shown to be a doctor. In the manga's conclusion, Dōmoto's father is revealed to be a lawyer and it is implied that both Kiyokazu and Takashi work at his firm.
Hiroyasu Ueda (植田 弘康, Ueda Hiroyasu)
Voiced by: Tomoyuki Higuchi
A kindhearted baker and owner of the Tirol Confectionery (also known as the Chiroru Bakery). He gives Kobato a job at Christmas and gives Sayaka free chocolate on Valentine's Day when he notices how fixated she seems on the box of chocolate she is holding. He makes several short appearances in the Newtype installment of the manga. He and his assistant, Yumi Omura (大村 裕美, Ōmura Yumi) (voiced by Aki Toyosaki), are both crossover characters from Chobits; this is also the case with the Tirol Confectionery.
Kohaku (琥珀, Kohaku)
Voiced by: Chiwa Saitō
Protagonist of Wish, an angel that long ago fell in love with Shuichiro Kudo (栩堂 琇一郎, Kudō Shūichirō), a human man, and has been living with him (in several reincarnated forms) for centuries. Kohaku is an acquaintance of Genko and several of the inhabitants of the Spirit World, many who admire the angel's singing voice, and has commented on Kobato's progress and the consequences of Ioryogi's actions. After meeting the angel, Ginsei begins visiting Kohaku on a regular basis, particularly as he begins to worry about Kobato and Ioryogi's fates if Kobato is unable to fulfill her wish.
In the anime series, Kohaku is introduced early in the series and befriends Kobato. Because Ioryogi is aware of Kohaku's true nature, he constantly asks Kohaku if there's something they can do to change Kobato's wish, though Kohaku's response is always that there's nothing to do. At the end of the series, it is Kohaku who explains to Kiyokazu the nature of Kobato's wish and assures the young man that if they are fated to be together they will be in time.
Suisho (水晶, Suishō)
The angel who shares the same soul as Kobato. Iorogi describes her as clumsy and not particularly beautiful, but fell in love after he heard her sing and started a war with Heaven in order to be with her. When Kobato died as a casualty of the war, Suishou offered her own soul in order to resurrect Kobato, though at the cost of not being able to reincarnate. Her own personality is dormant within Kobato, who revived without any memories or sense of the real world save what she is taught by Ioryogi. Like Kobato, she has trouble pronouncing Iorogi's name correctly and also called him Ioryogi.
Ushagi (うしゃぎさん, Ushagi-san)
The messenger of God (who also appears in Wish), who takes the form of a silent plush rabbit with wings and carries messages in the form of a flower. Ushagi will often approach Ioryogi with messages regarding how long Kobato has to complete her task of filling the flask and is unyielding with its demands, despite its gentle appearance. In the anime, Ushagi is also responsible for erasing everyone's memories of Kobato after she finishes filling her flask, though Kiyokazu manages to recover his memories of her.

== Media ==
=== Manga ===
Authored by Clamp, the manga was first serialized in Shogakukan's seinen manga magazine Monthly Sunday Gene-X, as Kobato (kari) (こばと (仮); "Kobato (temporary title)"), from December 18, 2004, to August 19, 2005. It was later serialized as Kobato (こばと。) in Kadokawa Shoten's Newtype magazine from October 10, 2006, to July 8, 2011. Kadokawa Shoten collected its chapters in six tankōbon volumes, released from December 26, 2007, to August 24, 2011.

In April 2007, Newtype USA announced a special agreement with manga powerhouse Clamp to exclusively serialize Kobato in the pages of the magazine. Kobato began its serial run in the June 2007 issue of Newtype USA, and was to continue its exclusive serialization through the May 2008 issue, comprising 12 installments in total. However Newtype USA ceased publication with the February 2008 issue, having serialised 9 of the 12 installments. In July 2009, Yen Press announced that they had acquired the license to publish Kobato in English in North America during their panel at San Diego Comic-Con. The manga was released in North America in May 2010 in honor of Clamp's 20th anniversary.

In Europe, the series was licensed by Pika Édition for France, JPF for Poland and Norma Editorial for Spain.

=== Anime ===
A 24-episode anime adaption aired on autumn of 2009, animated by Madhouse and supervised by Clamp's Nanase Ohkawa. xxxHolic writer Michiko Yokote is also supervising the scripts along with Ohkawa. The anime began its broadcast on October 6, 2009. Sentai Filmworks has licensed the series. On October 17, 2012, Crunchyroll announced that the anime would be available on their website through their anime catalog.

The opening theme "Magic Number" is performed by Maaya Sakamoto and the ending themes "Jellyfish no Kokuhaku" (episodes 1–19) and "Watashi ni Dekiru Koto" (episodes 20–23) by Megumi Nakajima.

=== Other ===
Kobato, along with most of Clamp's other titles, appeared in Clamp's second music video, Clamp in Wonderland 2, which was the first time the characters Kobato and Ioryogi were animated.

Two Kobato light novels were published by Kadokawa Shoten. The first one titled The Girls Came From Heaven (空から来た少女) was released on April 15, 2010. The second one, Just a Wish (たったひとつの願い) followed it on July 15, 2010. Two guidebooks from the series have also been released by Kadokawa. The first one, TV Anime Kobato Characters Collection (TVアニメ「こばと。」CHARACTERS COLLECTION), was released on March 4, 2010. A guidebook of the series, TV Kobato Guidebook Happy Memories (TVアニメ「こばと。」公式ガイドブック Happy Memories), was released on May 26, 2010.

== Reception ==
Lissa Pattillo of Anime News Network finds that the manga "is a delightfully charismatic read that's full of magic and mirth" and "evokes the charm of Clamp's shoujo series skill and has only just begun unraveling the mysteries of this likeable cast of characters".

Theron Martin sees that the anime version "is often quite funny, not always predictable, and provides a solid story hook for future developments". Summer Mullins describes that the "animation is stellar, the backgrounds are beautiful, and the music is gorgeous". Carlo Santos finds that "the series is either a ridiculous amalgam of fairytale dreck or a poignant slice-of-life with fantasy elements".
