= Gate 7 =

Manga

- Cover of the first volume as published by Shueisha featuring Hana
- Genre: Fantasy
- Manga
- Written by: Clamp
- Published by: Shueisha
- English publisher: NA: Dark Horse Comics
- Imprint: Jump Comics SQ.
- Magazine: Jump Square
- Original run: March 2011 – February 2013 (Note: Permanent hiatus)
- Volumes: 4

Gate 7 (stylized in all caps) is a Japanese manga series written and illustrated by the manga artist group Clamp. It was originally published as a one-shot in December 2010, and later began serialization in the March 2011 issue of Shueisha's monthly shōnen manga magazine Jump Square. It concerns a young student who visits a shrine in Kyoto and meets a beautiful childlike female-looking warrior who invites him to fight supernatural enemies. The manga is licensed in English in North America by Dark Horse Comics.

== Plot ==
Gate 7 follows Chikahito Takamoto, a secondary school student whose strong interest in history brings him to Kyoto, where he meets a beautiful childlike warrior named Hana, who fights supernatural enemies with the aid of Tachibana and Sakura, two young men with magical powers of their own. The trio of Hana, Tachibana, and Sakura are members of the Urashichiken Hanamachi, a secret society dedicated to waging battle against otherworldly creatures that appear in Kyoto.

As Chikahito soon learns, the Urashichiken's battles go back to the Sengoku era in Japan, when warlords and other key figures attempted to defeat their rivals by forming blood contracts with powerful spiritual beings known as Oni. Since then, many of masters of the Oni have reincarnated in the present, with the Urashichiken's current leader being the reincarnation of Toyotomi Hidetsugu, and they struggle to find the long-missing body of Oda Nobunaga in order to obtain the most powerful Oni of all. Chikahito inexplicably finds himself in the midst of the otherworldly spaces where the battles are fought as he begins his new life in Kyoto.

== Characters ==
=== Main characters ===
Hana (はな)
A beautiful, childlike warrior, Hana wields special powers, helping them fight supernatural enemies. They invite Chikahito to live with them and the two men who accompany them, Tachibana and Sakura. In the beginning of the series, they kiss Chikahito upon meeting him, although it was revealed later by Sakura that they had actually cast a spell on him that made the two of them reunite in the near future. When not in battle, Hana is a seemingly normal child with a fondness for noodles. In truth, Hana is neither male, nor female. Little is actually known about Hana.
Chikahito Takamoto (高本 致佳人, Takamoto Chikahito)
A shy, young boy in his second year of high school, Chikahito takes a sightseeing trip to ancient Kyoto, his dream being that he wishes to live there. While wandering in the grounds of the legendary Shinto shrines of Kitano Tenman-gū, Chikahito stumbles upon a mystical realm to find a beautiful young person named Hana and their comrades, Tachibana and Sakura. His immunity to their powers reveals that he isn't the only ordinary one there. He is welcomed by Hana to live with them, Tachibana, and Sakura. Chikihito is a good cook, and is very knowledgeable of Kyoto and famous historical figures of Japan.
Tachibana (橘)
The mysterious, handsome, and often ruthless, Tachibana is a companion of Hana, and a university student. His name, Tachibana, means wild orange, the same kind of tree that is famous for being of the south side of the Kyoto Imperial Palace. Often acting like an older brother to Hana, he is protective of them and is often worried about them. He appears annoyed at the presence of Chikahito, addressing him as an "ordinary human" upon meeting him. Like Hana and Sakura, he fights the supernatural beasts by summoning elements. His motives for fighting for the Urashichiken are to save his twin sister, Princess Sugi (杉姫, Sugi-hime), who was abducted by Iemitsu Tokugawa, the third shogun of the Tokugawa Dynasty. Tachibana has the ability to summon Yang weapons for Hana.
Sakura (桜)
Another of Hana's companions and Tachibana's partner, Sakura is a gentleman who also assists in fighting Hana and Tachibana's supernatural enemies. His name, Sakura, means cherry blossom, the tree that is famous for being on the south side of the Kyoto Imperial Palace. Like Tachibana, he cares a lot about Hana and their well being. He will often tease Chikahito, making Chikahito question Hana's gender. Though he teases him, he appears much more welcoming toward Chikahito than Tachibana. When in battle, Sakura is in charge of making the borders surrounding the dimension in which they fight in. In his everyday life, he works as a male attendant for geiko and maiko. Sakura has the ability to summon Yin weapons for Hana.

=== Historical figures ===
Toyotomi Hidetsugu (豊臣 秀次)
The first reincarnation of a famous Japanese historical figure introduced, Hidetsugu appears to a calm person, who gets along quite well with people. He visits his own grave, and reveals his Oni, Mikoto.
Tokugawa Iemitsu (徳川 家光)
The main antagonist who wants to locate the body of Oda Nobunaga and claim his Oni, which is believed to be the most powerful of all. Having the appearance of a young, androgynous boy with purple eyes, he approaches Chikahito and enrolls in his school under the name of Yuu Aoi. He has the habit of allowing his Oni to feed on humans.
Date Masamune (伊達 政宗)
An ally of the Urashichiken residents, his Oni, Kurikara, takes the shape of a sword stored inside the body of his companion Kojūrō. He dotes a lot on Hana and does not contain his love for them, much to the others' annoyance.

== Publication ==
Gate 7 debuted as a one-shot in the monthly shōnen manga magazine Jump Square in the December 2010 issue, before returning to the magazine as a serial in the March 2011 issue. Four bound volumes have been compiled and published by Shueisha from June 3, 2011, to February 4, 2013.

Dark Horse Comics licensed the series for an English-language translation in North America and published the four volumes from October 19, 2011, to July 17, 2013. It has also been licensed in Spain, France, Germany, Brazil, Hong Kong, South Korea, and Taiwan.

In 2013, Clamp announced the series would go on a short break due to a member's illness. However, as of 2014 the series was officially announced to be on indefinite hiatus, and was removed from Jump Square's online catalog.

=== Volume list ===
No.	Original release date	Original ISBN	English release date	English ISBN
1	June 3, 2011	978-4-08-870251-3	October 19, 2011	978-1-59582-806-4
2	November 4, 2011	978-4-08-870344-2	February 29, 2012	978-1-59582-807-1
3	May 2, 2012	978-4-08-870410-4	August 29, 2012	978-1-59582-902-3
4	February 4, 2013	978-4-08-870544-6	July 17, 2013	978-1-59582-961-0

== Reception ==
Gate 7 received mixed reception during its publication run. In Japan, only volumes 3 and 4 ranked on Oricon's comic ranking charts, peaking at fourth place and fifth place respectively, for one week each. Total sales for volume 3 came out to 186,288 copies, while total sales for volume 4 dropped to 174,362 copies. Praise was given to the beautiful and highly detailed art style, akin to Clamp's older series RG Veda, but many critics pointed out that scenes were often too cluttered and sometimes hard to read. However the majority of non-Japanese readers mainly criticized the amount of historical Japanese knowledge that was required in order to understand the plot and character references. Lesley Aeschliman of the Seattle Post-Intelligencer wrote, "The only drawback to this series is the fact that a reader does need to have at least a little bit of knowledge of Japanese history in order to truly understand some of the concepts introduced". Though Dark Horse Comics included a glossary of terms and translations in the back of the book, Rebecca Silverman of Anime News Network wrote, "[F]lipping to that glossary every time a new Japanese word is introduced (or repeated, if you're short on memory) is annoying and detracts from the experience of reading a story. While their commitment to authenticity is admirable, in this case it is a detraction." Silverman gave an overall rating of C+.
