= The One I Love (manga) =

Japanese manga

- Cover of the English-language translation as published by Tokyopop (2004)

わたしのすきなひと (Watashi no Sukinahito)
- Genre: Romance, Slice of life
- Manga
- Written by: Clamp
- Published by: Kadokawa Shoten
- English publisher: NA: Tokyopop (former) Viz Media (current)
- Magazine: Monthly Young Rose
- Original run: December 1993 – June 1995
- Volumes: 1

The One I Love (Japanese: わたしのすきなひと, Hepburn: Watashi no Sukinahito) is a romantic, slice-of-life shōjo (targeted towards girls) manga by Clamp, an all-female, manga artist team consisting of Satsuki Igarashi, Mokona, Tsubaki Nekoi, and Nanase Ohkawa. Appearing as a monthly serial in the Japanese manga magazine Monthly Young Rose from December 1993 to June 1995, the twelve stories were collected into a bound volume by Kadokawa Shoten and published in July 1995. The One I Love contains twelve independent manga stories, each focusing on an aspect of love and accompanied by an essay. Ohkawa wrote the essays while Nekoi illustrated the manga; it was the first time she primarily illustrated a manga by Clamp. Some of the stories draw on the life experiences of the women while others take inspiration from conversations they had with friends.

In 2003, Tokyopop licensed The One I Love for an English-language translation in North America, and published it in October 2004. Viz Media republished the manga in February 2015. The manga has also been translated into other languages. Reviewers have identified a few themes in the collection. They had a range of reactions to The One I Love: some considered it heartfelt entertainment, while others reviewed it less positively, as a badly done take on romance.

== Plot ==
Each story of The One I Love consists of seven pages of manga and an accompanying essay.

- "Different" (ちがう, Chigau): A girl asks to meet her boyfriend in the park after they have had a fight. She wants to apologize, but she does not know what to say. She wears a kimono instead. When she meets her boyfriend, she finds that he is dressed up too; he had the same idea as she did.
- "Cute" (かわいい, Kawaii): A girl reflects on the word "cute" with her boyfriend. She cannot visualize "cute," so she does not understand why it makes her happy when he says that she is cute.
- "I Miss You" (あいたい, Aitai): A girl has doubts about staying with her boyfriend, who has a very demanding work schedule. In the end, he skips work to visit her, and she decides that their romantic relationship will work out.
- "A Younger Man" (としした, Toshishita): A young woman working at a bakery reflects on a past unsuccessful relationship with a younger man. In the end, a younger bakery worker asks her on a date, and she is hopeful that their romantic relationship will work out.
- "Suddenly" (とつぜん, Totsuzen): A girl working in a design company thinks about her past relationships, and one of her coworkers, whom she does not get along with. When a design job goes wrong and that coworker offers his ideas, she realizes that she is in love with him.
- "Together" (いっしょに, Isshoni): A girl reflects on her childhood sweetheart, who introduced her to playing the harmonica.
- "Pretty" (きれい, Kirei): A girl panics as she decides what to wear to meet her boyfriend. When she is late to meet him, she realizes that her boyfriend always thinks she is pretty no matter what she wears.
- "Insecure" (ふあん, Fuan): A girl has a dream about her boyfriend ending their relationship, and she is worried that it is a premonition.
- "Courage" (ゆうき, Yûki): A girl confesses her love on Valentine's Day.
- "Normal" (ふつう, Futsû): A young woman has doubts about marrying her boyfriend. In the end, she realizes that even if they marry, nothing will change between them.
- "Apart" (はなれる, Hanareru): A young woman wonders if her long-distance boyfriend is being faithful. In the end, she finds out that he is very dedicated to her.
- "Marriage" (けっこん, Kekkon): A young woman about to be married is nervous about her future. She is worried that she might change, but her husband reassures her that they will change together.

== Development ==
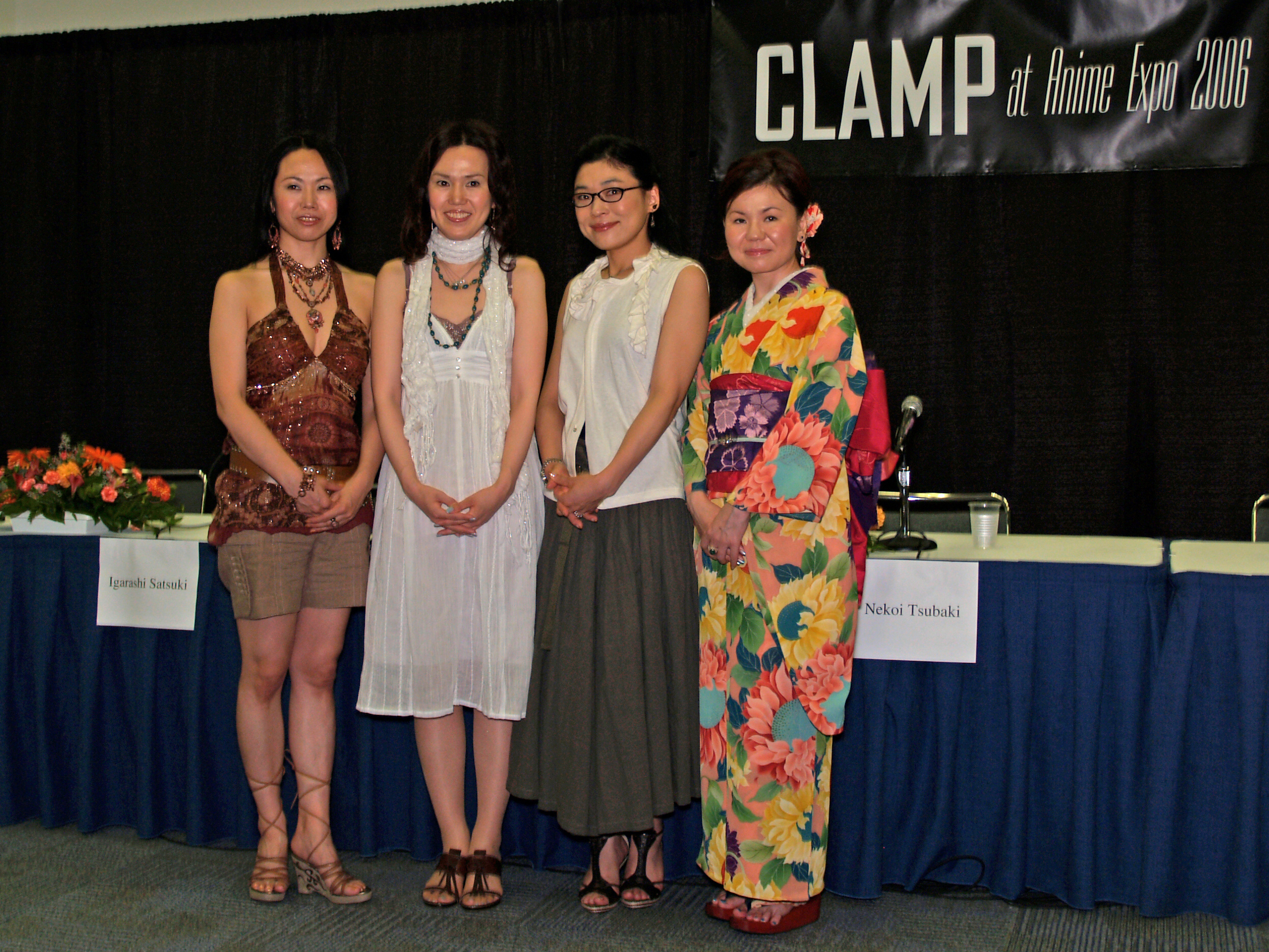
The members of Clamp made an appearance at Anime Expo 2006; from left to right, Satsuki Igarashi, Nanase Ohkawa, Tsubaki Nekoi, Mokona.

The One I Love was developed by Clamp—the all-female, manga artist team consisting of Satsuki Igarashi, Mokona, Tsubaki Nekoi, and Nanase Ohkawa. The group decided on the theme of romance after considering the target audience of the manga magazine Monthly Young Rose, whose editors had asked them for a manga. For The One I Love, Ohkawa wrote the essays, and Nekoi illustrated the manga, the first time she primarily illustrated a series for the group. For costumes, Ohkawa used "Anon non-no Olive" as a reference. Additionally, the preview panels of each story featured different visual motifs, primarily girls and animals. In retrospective, Nekoi self-deprecatingly thought that her illustrations of the female protagonists, including working women, made them resemble junior high students.

Some of the stories in The One I Love contain autobiographical elements. "Different" and "Cute" draw on Ohkawa's personal experiences, while "Together" draws on Mokona's. Additionally, "Suddenly" is based on her admiration of manga artist Hagiwara Kuzushi's dedication to his fans. "Normal", "Apart", and "Insecure" were inspired by Ohkawa's conversations with friends, and "I Miss You" has its origins in a conversation with manga artist Okazaki Takeshi, who rarely saw his girlfriend because of his work. "A Younger Man" stems from Ohkawa's conversation with actor Tonesaku Toshihide and his thoughts on men and age in a relationship. In contrast, "Courage" appeared as a Valentine's Day story in the February issue of Young Rose; Clamp rarely had opportunities to create seasonal stories, as the magazine that typically serialized their work did not run seasonal stories.

== Release ==
Written and illustrated by Clamp, the stories of The One I Love appeared as a monthly serial in Monthly Young Rose from December 1993 to June 1995. Kadokawa Shoten collected the stories into a bound volume, and published it on July 16, 1995.

In 2003, Tokyopop announced that it had licensed The One I Love for an English-language translation, along with four other manga by Clamp; it published The One I Love on October 12, 2004. However, on May 31, 2011, Tokyopop shut down its publishing branch in North America, with all of its Japanese manga licenses returned. Viz Media digitally republished the manga on February 10, 2015. The One I Love has also been translated into other languages, including French by Editions Tonkam, and German by Egmont Manga & Anime.

== Reception ==
A reviewer for Anime News Network, Mikhail Koulikov wrote that readers would have various reactions to The One I Love: he felt that some would regard it as "charming" and others would find it upsetting that the female protagonists were primarily defined by their worry over their relationships. While considering it one of Clamp's minor works, he stated that it was "unusual" for including some colored pages when the majority of manga is printed in black and white; being a slice-of-life manga; and featuring Tsubaki Nekoi's art, as prior to the time of his review, most of their works translated into English had been drawn by another member of Clamp. Koulikov wrote that "insecurity and self-doubt" served as the theme of the anthology. Johanna Draper Carlson, a reviewer for Publishers Weekly, wrote that some of the stories were worrisome, particularly one that she felt "justifies having an interest in whatever your boyfriend likes," and contained stereotypes as a result of limited space. She also stated that the essays included generalizations about women and "quickly become redundant." In Manga: The Complete Guide, Mason Templar suggested a possible theme of being one's self in relationships, but felt that it appeared "almost anti-feminist in execution," as only the female characters underwent a change in behavior. Templar rated the series one-and-a-half out of four stars, and criticized it as a naïve take on romance; Templar suggested Cardcaptor Sakura, Chobits, or Man of Many Faces as better examples of Clamp's romantic manga. A reviewer of the French edition wrote that repetitive nature of the stories detracted from the manga's appeal, and made for a "laborious" reading experience, although the reviewer felt that a "romantic" reader would not mind this. Conversely, another reviewer for Anime News Network, Liann Cooper, wrote that the stories were "incredibly sweet and touching" and were best read a few stories at a time. According to Cooper, The One I Love would appeal to fans of Clamp or shōjo, manga targeted towards girls.
