= Wish (manga) =

Japanese shōjo manga series

- Cover of the first volume of the English-language translation, as released by Tokyopop (2002)

ウィッシュ (Wisshu)
- Genre: Fantasy. romantic comedy
- Manga
- Written by: Clamp
- Published by: Kadokawa Shoten
- English publisher: AUS: Madman Entertainment; NA: Viz Media
- Magazine: Mystery DX
- Original run: November 1995 – August 1998
- Volumes: 4
- Anime television film
- Released: December 17, 1997
- Runtime: 6 minutes

Wish (Japanese: ウィッシュ, Hepburn: Wisshu) is a Japanese shōjo manga series created by Clamp. It is published in English by Tokyopop. The American translation was imported to Australia by Madman Entertainment.

== Plot ==
While walking home from work one day, a doctor named Shuichiro notices an angel, Kohaku, stuck on a tree and being attacked by a crow. He rescues Kohaku and, in return, Kohaku offers to grant him a wish. However, Shuichiro does not want one. He likes his life as it is, his work is going well, he has no money problems and he believes in fulfilling his own dreams. Kohaku decides that the best thing to do is stay and help Shuichiro until he does think of a wish they can grant.

During their stay, the angel Hisui, and two demons, Koryuu and Kokuyo, also begin living in the house, along with the Koryuu's servants Ruri and Hari. Kokuyo is the son of Satan and is in love with Hisui, who is one of the four Angel Masters controlling the four elements: earth, wind, fire, and water; with wind being their element. Kokuyo admits that he had sex with Hisui and that is how they ended up together. This relationship, however, is forbidden in both Heaven and Hell, so the two sought refuge on Earth. Kohaku originally came to Earth to find Hisui, who had been a mentor and parental figure to them. In spite of his new housemates, Shuichiro remains as stoic as ever. Although he persists in not making a wish, without realizing it, he grows attached to Kohaku.

Eventually Kohaku is forced back to Heaven against their will by God because they have the important task of hatching the eggs from the Tree of Life by singing to them. However, Kohaku deeply misses Shuichiro and realizes they had developed feelings for him. Likewise, Shuichiro misses them and continues to hold on to one of their earrings to try to prevent them from staying in Heaven. Unable to bear the separation, Kohaku returns without God's permission, and the couple is happily reunited. Their reunion is short-lived as the three remaining Angel Masters come to Earth to punish both Kohaku and Hisui for being in love with a demon. Hisui is stripped of their Angel Master status and is banished from Heaven, to their and Kokuyo's delight. Kohaku, in turn, is stripped of their powers and forced to remain in a small form for the next one hundred years. They are devastated that they could not grant Shuichiro's wish, but as Shuichiro's wish was for Kohaku to stay with him forever, it was one he could not have fulfilled himself.

Shortly afterward, Shuichiro suddenly dies while on a walk with Kohaku. Kohaku is put into a one hundred-year sleep so that Shuichiro will have been reincarnated by the time Kohaku awakens. Kokuyo and Hisui are sentenced to look after their sleeping form. One hundred years later, the reincarnation of Shuichiro, now 17, passes by his old house which awakens Kohaku. He has no memory of them, so their relationship starts anew, but he soon remembers them.

== Characters ==
The authors and the translators state both in the text and in the sidebars that there is no gender in either Heaven or Hell but they have adopted the convention of referring to characters with gendered pronouns to make things in the translation easier.

- Shuichiro Kudo (栩堂 琇一郎, Kudō Shūichirō) – The doctor who saves the angel Kohaku from a crow in the control of Koryu in the beginning of the story. He is sceptical of the fact Kohaku is indeed an angel (believing them at first to be a small child or even a talking doll), and is a bit slow to warm up to the truth, but they soon make enough of an impact on his life for him to truly miss them when they are forced to return to Heaven. He is a very no-nonsense sort of man who seems stoic and unfriendly, however he is a very patient man and is shown many times to have a great depth of compassion. He has made a few token wishes, all of which have been rejected by Kohaku as they are not true desires, merely acts of kindness to them - such as when they try to water his plants and fail. He is content with his life, and he insists he has no wishes for Kohaku to grant for him. However, this doctor hides quite a few secrets of his own.
- Kohaku (琥珀) – An angel from Heaven and the main protagonist of the tale. They have been sent to Earth to find their missing teacher; Hisui, the Angel Master of the Wind. However, since they are only an angel in training, they lose the majority of their powers on Earth when the sun sets, which turns them into a chibi form of themself. It is in this vulnerable state that they meet Shuichiro, who saves them from a crow, and are almost immediately taken with him. Though he insists he wants for nothing in his quiet life, they are bound by duty to pay off their debt to him. When Shinichiro Kudo comes to visit his grandson, he addresses Kohaku as a woman. Kohaku corrects him, and also tells him that they aren't a man either. The topic is left at that. Kohaku is very cheerful, sweet and often described as clumsy.
- Koryu (紅榴, Kōryū) – A demon of Hell, they can be considered Kohaku's demon equivalent; they too are only in training, and while on Earth they are forced to turn into a chibi version of theirself during the daytime. They love to cause trouble for the little angel, and toward the end of the series it is implied that they merely teases Kohaku because they has a crush on them. They are the one who sent the crow to attack Kohaku in the beginning of the story.
- Hari (破璃) and Ruri (瑠璃) – Twin cat girls only distinguishable from each other by their jewellery. They are servants of Koryu, and both of them adore him to the point of bickering with each other on occasion. They change to black cats when their master is in his smaller form.
- Hisui (翡翠) – The Archangel of the Wind, and Kohaku's mentor, who disappeared after a meeting at the bridge between Heaven and Hell. It is revealed that the relationship consummated between Hisui and Kokuyo, a Prince of Hell and son of Satan, meant in order to stop a war between the two worlds, the angel and demon pair must live on earth, protecting and watching over Kohaku.
- Kokuyo (黒燿, Kokuyō) – The Prince of Hell and son of Satan, who fell in love with Hisui, and now lives voluntarily on Earth for the sake of love. Out of consideration for Hisui he restrains his dietary cravings. Kokuyo is aware of Shuichiro's impending death, but God stops him from telling anyone else so as to make sure things go as they should.
- Touki (透輝, Tōki) – The Archangel of the Water in Heaven. Touki has a reputation for being cold-hearted, mostly because of the hardened look that's always on their face. Touki first appears to see why Usagi hasn't returned to Heaven and ends up bringing Kohaku back with them. They are very fond of Kohaku and protective of them in their own silent way. Touki has a very discreet relationship with Ranshou and though they are very shy with their feelings for them, Touki does genuinely care about Ranshou.
- Ranshou (藍晶, Ranshō) – The Archangel of the Earth in Heaven. They come off as one of the most easy-going angels in all of Heaven despite their status. They love to tease Kohaku and they're open with their affection for Touki. Like Touki, they are very discreet about their relationship but they can admit he loves them. But their loyalty to God is unwavering and they're not hesitant in delivering punishments handed out (as with the cases of Hisui and Kohaku).
- Ryuuki (榴輝, Ryūki) – The Archangel of the Fire in Heaven. They have a very hotheaded personality and are quick to act before thinking. They are madly in love with Hisui and are convinced they were kidnapped out of Heaven, often ranting about Hisui in the presence of the other Angel Masters, so much so that Ranshou often leaves Touki to deal with it. When Ryuuki finds out Hisui left of their own volition and is deeply in love with Kokuyo, they are very hurt by it, but want Hisui to be happy and lets them go, though they vows to hate Kokuyo forever.
- Usagi (うしゃぎさん, Ushagi-san) – Usagi is a small white rabbit with wings that relays messages from God. The messages it delivers look like flowers, that dissolve and automatically implant themselves in the receiver's mind. Usagi relays messages from Kohaku to God and back throughout the series. The messenger also appears in the same capacity in Kobato.
- Shinichiro Kudo (栩堂 信一郎, Kudō Shinichirō) – Shuichiro Kudo's grandfather. He lives in Canada, though he comes to visit Shuichiro on occasion. During one such visit, he tells Kohaku about some of Shuichiro's background.
- Hotaru Kudo (栩堂 蛍, Kudō Hotaru) – Shuichiro Kudo's mother, seen during a segment when the characters travel to the past. She is blind and paraplegic, though she is still able to notices Kohaku and Koryu spying on her. She is actually a wisteria tree fairy and her abilities are sufficiently powerful enough for her to know that Shuichiro's father will die relatively soon. After she says goodbye to Shuichiro and wishes him a good future, she reverts to her true form as a wisteria tree. It seems doubtful that Shuichiro or Shinichiro know that Hotaru was really a wisteria tree fairy as they believed that she simply disappeared.
- Shusuke Kudo (栩堂 周丞, Kudō Shūsuke) – Shuichiro's father and "husband" of Hotaru. He originally found Hotaru near a wisteria tree years before the beginning of the story and adopted Shuichiro as his son. He died in a plane crash when Shuichiro was in high school.

== Media ==
=== Manga ===
Written and illustrated by Clamp, Wish appeared as a serial in the manga magazine Mystery DX from the November 1995 issue to the August 1998 issue. Kadokawa Shoten compiled the chapters into four bound volumes and published them from June 1, 1996, to August 1, 1998. In 2009, the series was republished with new covers from October 26 to September 26.

Tokyopop licensed the series for an English-language translation in North America and published it from August 27, 2002, to February 11, 2003. It was distributed in Australia and New Zealand by Madman Entertainment. Tokyopop returned the license following the closure of its North America publishing branch in 2011, and Viz Media is republishing Wish digitally, beginning on February 17, 2015. The series has also been translated into other languages such as French by Editions Tonkam, German by Carlsen Comics, Italian by Star Comics, Polish by Japonica Polonica Fantastica, Portuguese by Editora JBC (Brazil), and Spanish by Grupo Editorial Vid (Mexico) and Norma Editorial (Spain). Dark Horse Comics is republishing the manga in print form.

==== Volume list ====
No.	Original release date	Original ISBN	English release date	English ISBN
1	June 1, 1996	4-04-852771-1	August 27, 2002	978-1-59182-034-5
01. Fallen Angel; 02. An Angel's Day; 03. Her First Chore; 04. Getting to Know You; 05. A Secret; 06. A Matter of the Heart; Wish CLAMP Newsletter Special Edition: I. The Day Kohaku Arrived
2	January 8, 1997	4-04-852771-1	October 15, 2002	978-1-59182-060-4
07. The Foreigner; 08. An Ancient Tale; 09. Beneath the Wisterias; 10. The String Around Your Finger; 11. The Source of Pain; 12. A New Friend; Wish CLAMP Underground News: II. The Day Koryu Came to Visit
3	September 1, 1997	4-04-852859-9	December 10, 2002	978-1-59182-061-1
13. A Trip to the Amusement Park; 14. A Task from God; 15. Far Away; 16. An Angel's Song; 17. Your Feelings; EXTRA: Koryu; EXTRA: Hisui & Kokuyo; Wish CLAMP Underground News: III. The Day Hisui Came to Visit
4	August 1, 1998	4-04-852948-X	February 11, 2003	978-1-59182-080-2
18. To Be With You; 19. Time Together; 20. Confession; 21. God's Punishment; 22. A Wish That Cannot Be Fulfilled By Oneself; 23. Together Forever; EXTRA: And Then...; Wish CLAMP Underground News: IV. The Day Shuichiro and Kohaku Came to Visit

=== Drama CD ===
Voice cast for the drama CD:

- Kohaku: Hiroko Konishi
- Shūichirō Kudō: Kazuya Ichijō
- Kōryū: Yuka Imai
- Hisui: Kikuko Inoue
- Kokuyō: Jūrōta Kosugi
- Ruri: Ikue Ōtani
- Hari: Chinami Nishimura

== Adaptation ==
A 6-minute long animation clip based on Wish was created in 1997. It was included on the DVD of CLAMP 15th anniversary album "CLAMPAZAR" released in 2007.

== Appearances ==
Kohaku has made appearances in CLAMP in Wonderland, the manga and anime of Kobato, and in the manga Legal Drug (now known as Drug and Drop). Ruri and Hari has made appearances in Miyuki-Chan in Wonderland.

== Reception ==
Adam Arnold of Animefringe enjoyed the series for its "unique story, snappy dialogue, and fun set of characters that'll keep you enthralled reading to the very end."
