= Clamp (manga artists) =

Manga artist group

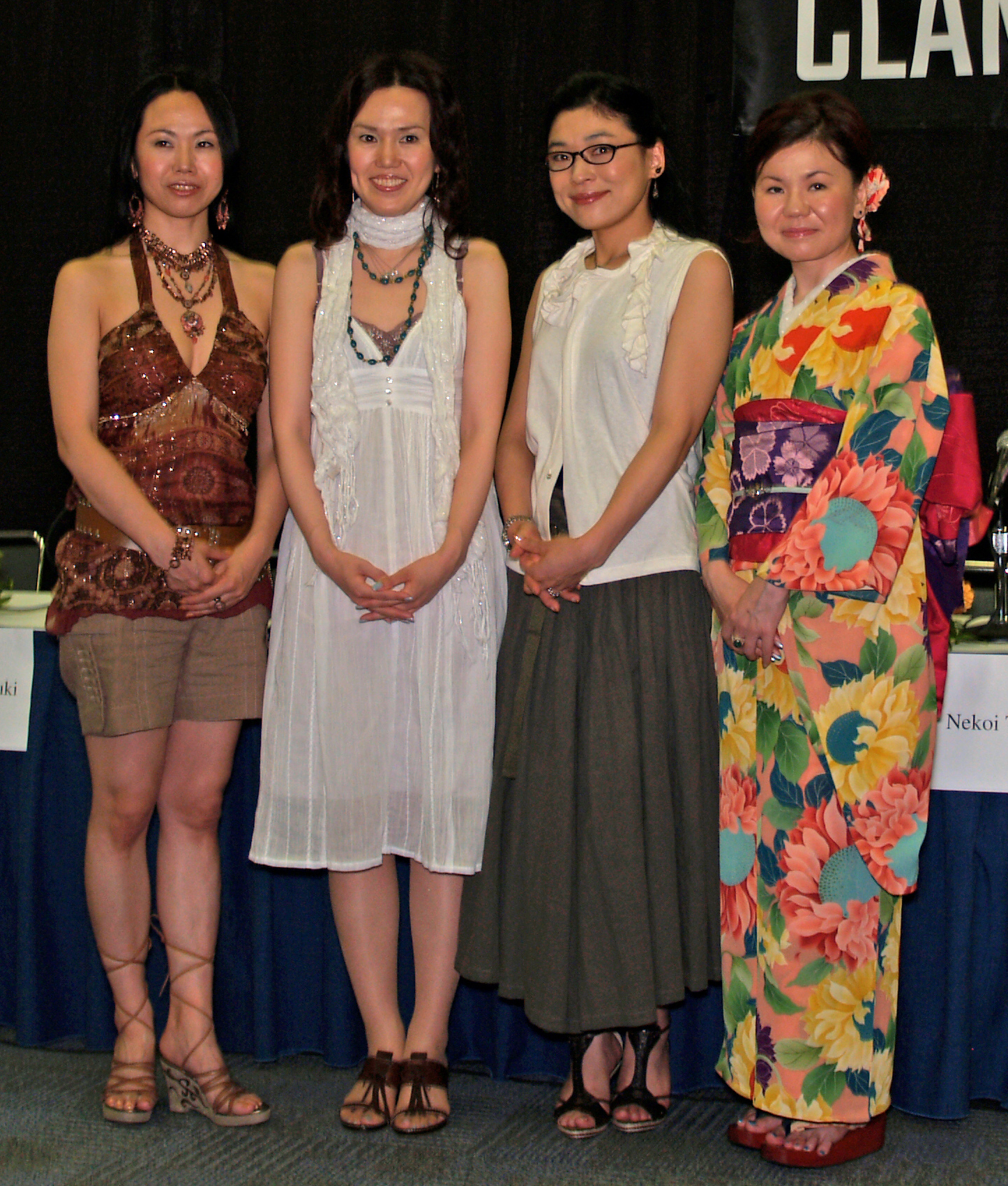
- Clamp at Anime Expo 2006. From left to right: Satsuki Igarashi, Nanase Ohkawa, Tsubaki Nekoi, and Mokona.
- Type: Manga studio
- Founded: 1987
- Headquarters: Japan
- Key people: Current: Nanase Ohkawa; Mokona; Tsubaki Nekoi; Satsuki Igarashi; Former: O-Kyon; Sei Nanao; Tamayo Akiyama; Leeza Sei; Sōshi Hishika; Jun Inoue; Kazue Nakamori; Shinya Ōmi

Clamp (stylized in all caps) is an all-female Japanese manga artist group, consisting of leader and writer Nanase Ohkawa (born in Osaka), and three artists whose roles shift for each series: Mokona, Tsubaki Nekoi, and Satsuki Igarashi (all born in Kyoto).

Clamp was first formed in the mid-1980s as a twelve-member group creating dōjinshi (self-published fan works), and began creating original manga in 1987. By the time the group made its mainstream publishing debut with RG Veda in 1989, it was reduced to seven members; three more members left in 1993, leaving the four current members of the group.

Notable works by Clamp include X (1992), Magic Knight Rayearth (1993), Cardcaptor Sakura (1996) and its sequel Cardcaptor Sakura: Clear Card (2016), Chobits (2000), and xxxHolic and Tsubasa: Reservoir Chronicle (both 2003). Various series by the group cross-reference each other, and characters reappear in multiple works by the group. Clamp are noted as among the most critically and commercially acclaimed manga artists in Japan, and as of 2007, have sold nearly 100 million books worldwide.

== Etymology ==
The name "Clamp" refers to a storage clamp, in the sense of "a bunch of potatoes". This is referenced in Duklyon: Clamp School Defenders, where a teacher is observed saying: "The name 'Clamp' incorporates the words 'hinge,' as well as 'potato mountain,' within its definition."

== History ==
=== Before their debut (1980s–1989) ===
Clamp originally began in the mid-1980s as a twelve-member dōjinshi circle, to fill a booth vacancy at Dream Comic, a doujin event in Osaka. To fill a vacancy next to Yun Kōga's CLUB/Y booth, they called themselves CLAMP, since club and clamp both started with kura (クラ) in Katakana spelling, and the booths were sorted according to gojūon order. The original circle included O-Kyon (お·きょん), Sei Nanao (七穂せい, Nanao Sei), Tamayo Akiyama (秋山 たまよ, Akiyama Tamayo), Leeza Sei (聖りいざ, Sei Riiza), Sōshi Hishika (日鷺総司, Hishika Sōshi), Kazue Nakamori (中森かずえ, Nakamori Kazue), Jun Inoue (井上譲, Inoue Jun),and Shinya Ōmi (大海神哉, Ōmi Shin'ya). Three of Clamp's artists—Mokona, Tsubaki Nekoi, and Satsuki Igarashi—first began drawing manga when they were teenagers, inspired by friends. The three artists were good friends in the same school. They met and befriended Nanase Ohkawa through one of her friends who had bought comics from Mokona. The original group of twelve members began to meet at every event held in Osaka and Kobe, which usually occurred once a month. Before they began creating original work, the group produced dōjinshi of Captain Tsubasa, and yaoi dōjinshi of Saint Seiya and JoJo's Bizarre Adventure. However, in 1987, the group stopped dōjinshi and began creating original work; it was at this time they began working on RG Veda, a loose adaptation of the Rigveda. Their first collaborative work was entitled "Clamp", which they continued to work on until shortly after their debut.

The group debuted as professional manga artists when they decided to print the manga RG Veda, which they had first started as a fan comic. After seeing the comic digest of the manga series that Clamp had published, an editor for Shinshokan's Wings manga magazine asked the group to work for them. They submitted an approximately sixty-page story as a sample, but the work was rejected. Ohkawa later lambasted the draft, stating that "everything was bad" and attributing the quality to the group's lack of experience, since they had never before completed a story as a cohesive group. The group was given another chance at publication should they submit a new story that Shinshokan liked; this time, they submitted RG Veda, which was serialized in Wings magazine.

During the time before their official debut, the group moved to Tokyo and rented a small, two-bedroom apartment. Ohkawa stated that she thought she was "gonna die there". Nekoi stated that "the only private space [they] had was under [their] desk."

By the time RG Veda debuted, its members had gone down to seven. During the production of the manga RG Veda, O-Kyon had left the group. In June 1990, Nanao officially left the group (last mentioned in Shōten 6). Hishika, Nakamori and Ōmi officially left in March 1993 (as mentioned in the Shōten 3). In October 1992, Akiyama and Sei officially left the group.

RG Veda was originally planned to be a single story rather than a series, although because of good reader response and higher-than-expected sales for its first volume Shinshokan permitted the group to create more volumes, however after each chapter of the manga was released, Shinshokan threatened that it would cease serialization should its popularity fall.

In July 1989, Genki Comics began serializing Clamp's second work, Man of Many Faces.

=== 1990–1999 ===
Genki Comics began serializing Duklyon: Clamp School Defenders in August 1991, which became the work that the three artists Mokona, Nekoi, and Igarashi enjoyed working on most. In March 1990, Wings began serializing Tokyo Babylon. In December 1990, Monthly Asuka ran Clamp School Detectives, and in May 1992, it began serializing X.

Clamp was serialized by many other magazines and publishers including Kobunsha publishing Shirahime-Syo: Snow Goddess Tales on June 10, 1992. In 1993, Clamp released four different manga: in March, Miyuki-chan in Wonderland, which began serializing in Newtype, in June, a Manga adaptations of Rex: A Dinosaur's Story, which serializing in Asuka Comics DX, in November, Magic Knight Rayearth which began serialized in Nakayoshi, and in December, The One I Love which was serialized in Monthly Young Rose. Nakayoshi also began to serialize Cardcaptor Sakura in May 1996; Ohkawa, Clamp's leader and storyboarder, particularly enjoyed working on Cardcaptor Sakura because unlike many of her previous works, it wasn't tragic. Wish first began serializing in Asuka Comics DX in October 1996. In December 1998, Suki: A Like Story began first serializing in Asuka Comics DX, and in January 1999, Angelic Layer first began serializing in Monthly Shōnen Ace.

=== 2000–2009 ===
Clamp's cross-referencing and storytelling led to characters being re-used in different ways. Left: Syaoran Li, originally from Cardcaptor Sakura. Centre: Syaoran as he first appears in later work Tsubasa: Reservoir Chronicle. Right: an alternative Syaoran who appears later in Tsubasa.

In 2001, Young Magazine began serializing Clamp's Chobits which completed its run in 2002. Although their previous works are targeted at a female audience, Chobits marked the first time Clamp wrote for an older teen male audience. Clamp began writing the two works that tell separate parts of the same overarching plot, xxxHolic serialized in Young Magazine beginning in 2003 followed by Tsubasa: Reservoir Chronicle serialized in the Weekly Shōnen Magazine beginning in the same year. Tsubasa marked the first time Clamp had ever tried writing for a younger male audience, although their first work published in the Shōnen demographic was Angelic Layer.

In 2004, Clamp's 15th anniversary as a manga artist group, the members changed their names from Nanase Ohkawa, Mokona Apapa, Mick Nekoi, and Satsuki Igarashi to Ageha Ohkawa, Mokona, Tsubaki Nekoi and Satsuki Igarashi (her name is pronounced the same, but written with different characters) respectively. To celebrate Clamp's 15th anniversary, Tokyopop released a twelve-part magazine series entitled Clamp no Kiseki that contained a plethora of information for fans. The August 2004 issue of Newtype USA, a magazine specializing in events of the anime and manga subcultures, reported that the members of Clamp simply wanted to try out new names. In a later interview with Ohkawa, it was revealed that initially Mokona wanted to drop her surname because it sounded too immature for her liking, while Nekoi disliked people mistakenly commenting on her as a Rolling Stones member. Ohkawa and Igarashi, wanting to go with the flow of Nekoi's and Mokona's name changes, changed their names as well.

In 2006, Clamp provided the character designs for Code Geass. This came into fruition after producer Yoshitaka Kawaguchi called them. This also marked Clamp's first time being requested to provide a character design for an anime series not originally created by them.

Ohkawa made her first appearance overseas at the Taipei International Book Exhibition sponsored by Production I.G that same year. During an interview there, she announced that Clamp would be making its first United States public debut at Anime Expo in July in Anaheim, California co-sponsored by Anime Expo, Del Rey Manga, Funimation and Tokyopop. They were well received at the convention as fans completely filled all 6,000 seats present in the auditorium of the focus panel in addition to more on the waiting list. By 2006, Clamp had reportedly sold in excess of 90 million copies of their manga internationally.

=== 2010–present ===
While Tsubasa ended in October 2009, xxxHolic ended in early 2011. The authors were satisfied with the two manga ending commenting it was difficult to serialize the two interconnected manga at the same time due to Tsubasa's focus on action which required them to write side stories for xxxHolic.

Clamp collaborated in the Blood: The Last Vampire spin off anime, Blood-C, as they are responsible for designing the characters and providing the story. Ohkawa wrote the scripts with series supervisor, Junichi Fujisaku for both anime series and the sequel movie, Blood-C: The Last Dark.

Legal Drug restarted serialization in the same year in Kadokawa Shoten's Young Ace under the new title of Drug and Drop. A new xxxHolic manga titled XXXHOLiC Rei also started serialization in Kodansha's Young Magazine in March 2013.

Clamp also provided character design for Studio Deen's the anime adaptation of Kabukibu!, which aired in April 2017.

Cardcaptor Sakura: Clear Card began serialization in 2016 with an anime that aired from January to June 2018 on NHK.

On October 19, 2020, the official Clamp fans website posted a link to a YouTube video due to start on October 25, 2020. These daily links are each accompanied by a graphic displaying the number of days to go until the announcement, and a single word. Each word relates to a chapter of Tokyo Babylon from the respectively numbered tankobon volume. This has caused speculation among Clamp's fans that a new Tokyo Babylon related work is due to be announced. On October 25, 2020, at 15:00 UTC (October 26, 2020 at midnight Japan Standard Time), a trailer was released for a new anime adaptation of Tokyo Babylon. The new series, Tokyo Babylon 2021, will be released and set the story in the year 2021. It was to be made by the studio GoHands. The series was to debut in April 2021, but was postponed due to the production team's plagiarism incident. On March 28, 2021, the production committee announced that the series's production was discontinued, and Clamp and the production committee will restart the anime series with a different studio.

In January 2021, it was announced that a new series in the Cardfight!! Vanguard franchise will begin on April 3, 2021, and will feature character designs by Clamp. The new series will be called Vanguard overDress.

In June 2021, it was announced that Clamp will collaborate with Netflix to produce an original anime series based on the Grimms' Fairy Tales, with Wit Studio handling the animation. In March 2024, the series' title was revealed as The Grimm Variations, which was released as a Netflix exclusive in April 2024.

== Business model ==
The members of Clamp all share a single workplace and as such do not need to arrange specific meetings. Nanase Ohkawa acts as the group's spokesperson, producer-director, and storyboarder. Mokona is the chief character designer, while Igarashi and Nekoi work for the background; however, the three often shuffle their roles. Sometimes, they may split the work of the characters and backgrounds or have one person draw all the art depending on the story. The three artists try to stay as "close as possible" to Ohkawa's original designs. Ohkawa advises the artists on what colors to use. Although Ohkawa chooses which projects they decide to decline or accept, Satsuki Igarashi decides on the actual time and order the group works on each project, creating the schedules for time allotted to each individual work. They do not have any assistants, stating that assistants would slow them down because they would not understand the "years worth of jargon" they created among themselves.

Once Ohkawa has conceived a story, the four members of the group gather "to discuss the purpose of the story and its main characters". After the group members become familiar with the story, Ohkawa drafts an outline for the story and determines the story's setting. The ending for each story is predetermined. Ohkawa designs many of the characters early in the story's development; frequently appearing guest characters are designed from the beginning whereas minor characters are designed early on. As Ohkawa drafts the outline, the other three members formulate character designs by creating character profile sheets so as to avoid confusion. After drawing a sample story and sketch for their editor and receiving approval, Ohkawa assigns the roles to each group member and then chooses the visual styles depending on factors such as the complexity of the story, the chosen art style, and its relationship to the group's other works. Ohkawa provides a rough draft for each chapter detailing things such as dialogue, panel size, props, movement, and character's emotions.

On average for each chapter that they produce (for Clamp, an average of 20 pages of artwork in a magazine), storyboarding takes twelve hours, the script takes eight hours to write, and the artwork depends on the story. For example, a chapter of xxxHolic takes two days, whereas a chapter of X took four to five days.

== Style ==
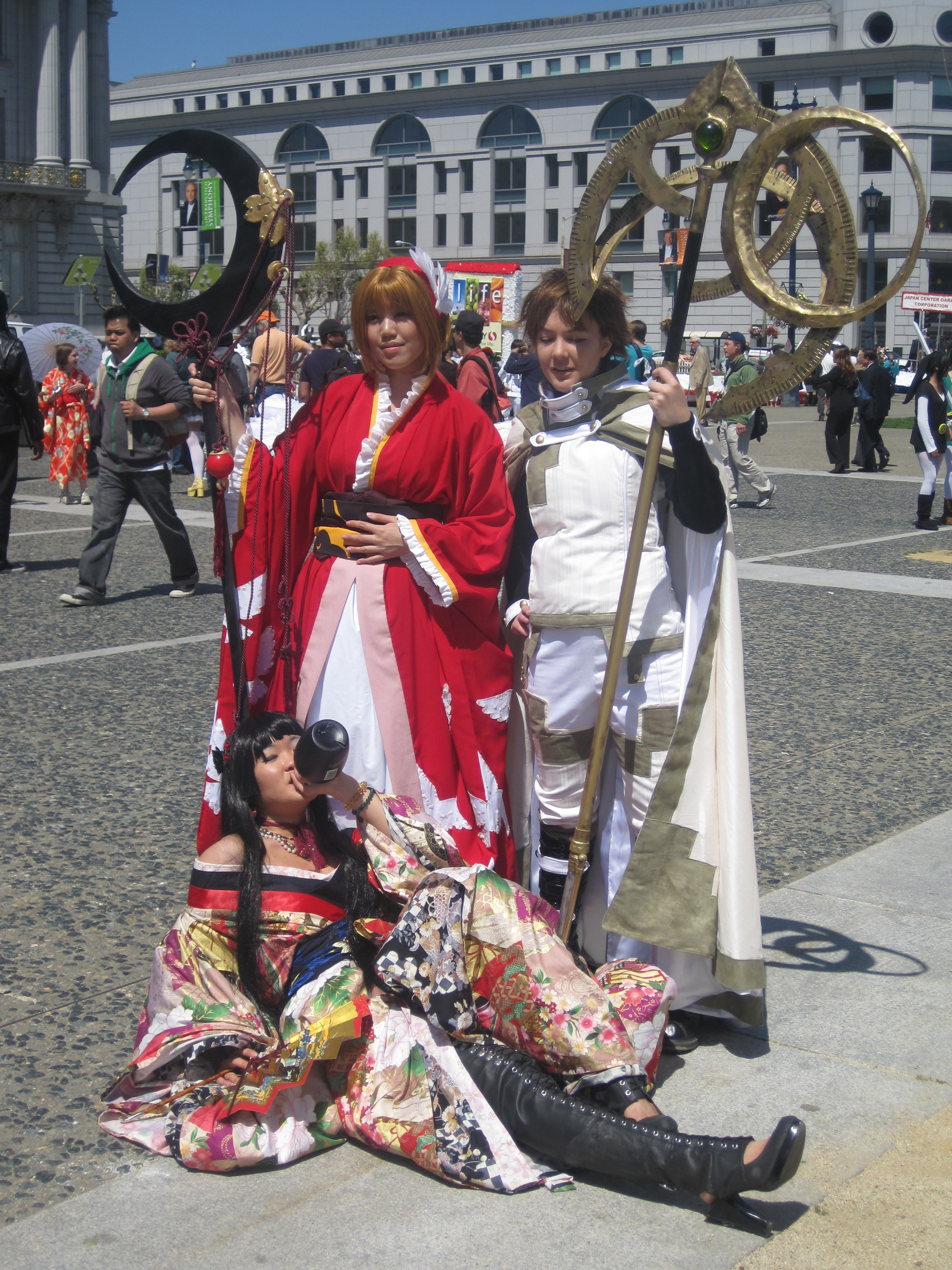
A group cosplaying three Clamp characters: Sakura (top left) and Syaoran (top right) from Tsubasa: Reservoir Chronicle; and Yuko Ichihara (bottom) from xxxHolic.

In general, Ohkawa gets her inspiration for the group from everyday events such as dreams or the news. Unlike most manga artists who specialize in a single genre, Clamp has created a diverse body of work. Clamp's genres vary widely, from childish and comedic (Cardcaptor Sakura,Clamp School Detectives) to more dramatic and teen-rated (xxxHolic, X) series. Furthermore, drawing from the idea of Osamu Tezuka's Star System as they did in Tsubasa: Reservoir Chronicle, Clamp often crossover characters from their own series into their other works, which gives rise to a loosely defined "Clamp Universe".

Although most of their manga are female-oriented, Clamp has also attracted male readers in their early works through their handling of fight scenes in X and Tokyo Babylon. Tsubasa: Reservoir Chronicle is a male-oriented manga but Clamp still added multiple motifs to attract female readers such as Syaoran's romantic journey. xxxHolic is an adult-oriented manga but it uses Kimihiro Watanuki as a protagonist that would attract a female demographic.

=== Art ===
The current members of Clamp took art-focused classes during their high school. However, Tsubaki Nekoi feels that, aside from basic art skills, drawing manga requires a different skill set; however, none of the group members has worked as an assistant for already established manga artists, and most of their ability is self-taught. Clamp's manga is distinguished by its diverse visual styles. Their work Clover, for example, is remarkable for its heavy use of negative space.

=== Themes ===
Clamp's works span a wide variety of themes. As opposed to keeping consistent themes across their works or having individual themes for each work, Nanase Ohkawa stated "we come up with a new theme for each story. One thing to say each time." Their works often deal with the theme of human fate that relates to Ohkawa's view on life; Ohkawa believes that "fate is something you choose", not a "mystical force manipulating your destiny", and that with determination and resolve, "you can change your fate".

Also common is the idea of soulmates, or couples tied together by fate. Syaoran and Sakura (featured in both Cardcaptor Sakura and Tsubasa: Reservoir Chronicle) are among Clamp's signature couples that best fits this representation. As also seen in Magic Knight Rayearth, three girls are bound together by fate to save Cephiro. Fate is also the reason the three girls consider each other "sisters"; another idea that elaborates people being tied together (family cannot be chosen). Clamp also explores the idea of chaste or pure love (as in the manga Chobits). Clamp's disregard for sex or gender (or at times biological age) in these couples has led them to write same-sex couples into many of their manga in contrast to many other manga artists (for example, Tōya and Yukito in Cardcaptor Sakura). A number of such couples have been shown together across parallel dimensions in the Clamp multiverse. Although Clamp often writes romantic works, Ohkawa has mentioned that she feels that it is more putting one's life on the line than love that causes women to grow or change. Clamp never features love as a central theme; Ohkawa stated in an interview with Takeshi Oshiguchi in 1997 for Animerica that she is not "good at love stories" since her "idea of a relationship is different from that of a lot of other people".

Perhaps drawing inspiration from Ohkawa's own poor right-eye vision, Clamp frequently features one-eyed characters or characters that lose their sight in one eye as means to express the feeling of loneliness (for example, Subaru and Seishirō in Tokyo Babylon and X and Fay in Tsubasa: Reservoir Chronicle). However, there is always something later on that comes to supplement the loss in vision.

== Works ==
Start	End	Title	Publisher	Serialized in	Status	Volumes
1989	1996	RG Veda	Shinshokan	Wings	Complete	10
1990	1991	Man of Many Faces	Kadokawa Shoten	Newtype	Complete	2
1990	1993	Tokyo Babylon	Shinshokan	Wings	Complete	7
1991	1993	Duklyon: Clamp School Defenders	Kadokawa Shoten	Newtype Comic Genki	Complete	2
1992	1993	Clamp School Detectives	Kadokawa Shoten	Monthly Asuka	Complete	3
1992	1992	Shirahime-Syo: Snow Goddess Tales	Kadokawa Shoten	Monthly Asuka	Complete	1
1992	2003	X/1999	Kadokawa Shoten	Monthly Asuka	Halted (Note: The remaining uncollected chapters following the hiatus were collected into "Volume 18.5", first released in the book All About Clamp. These were released as their own tankobon, "Volume 18.5", on 4 November 2023.)	19
1992	1994	Legend of Chun Hyang	Hakusensha	Serie Mystery - Special	Complete	1
1993	1995	Magic Knight Rayearth	Kodansha	Nakayoshi	Complete	3
1993	1995	Miyuki-chan in Wonderland	Kadokawa Shoten	Newtype	Complete	1
1993	1995	The One I Love	Kadokawa Shoten	Young Rose Comics DX	Complete	1
1995	1996	Magic Knight Rayearth II	Kodansha	Nakayoshi	Complete	3
1995	1998	Wish	Kadokawa Shoten	Monthly Asuka	Complete	4
1996	2000	Cardcaptor Sakura	Kodansha	Nakayoshi	Complete	12
1997	1999	Clover	Kodansha	Amie	Halted	4
1999	2001	Angelic Layer	Kadokawa Shoten	Monthly Shōnen Ace	Complete	5
1999	2000	Suki: A Like Story	Kadokawa Shoten	Monthly Asuka	Complete	3
2000	2003	Legal Drug	Kadokawa Shoten	Monthly Asuka	Complete (Note: Drug & Drop is the continuation of Legal Drug)	3
2000	2002	Chobits	Kodansha	Young Magazine	Complete	8
2003	2011	xxxHolic	Kodansha	Young Magazine, then Bessatsu Shōnen Magazine	Complete	19
2003	2009	Tsubasa: Reservoir Chronicle	Kodansha	Weekly Shōnen Magazine	Complete	28
2005	2011	Kobato	Shogakukan, then Kadokawa Shoten	Monthly Sunday Gene-X, then Newtype	Complete	6
2011	2013	Gate 7	Shueisha	Jump SQ	Halted	4 (23 chapters)
2011	2013	Drug & Drop	Kadokawa Shoten	Young Ace	Halted	2 (17 chapters)
2013	N/A	xxxHolic: Rei	Kodansha	Young Magazine	Current	6 (82 chapters)
2014	2016	Tsubasa World Chronicle: Nirai Kanai-hen	Kodansha	Magazine Special	Complete	3 (19 chapters + extra)
2016	2024	Cardcaptor Sakura: Clear Card	Kodansha	Nakayoshi	Complete	16 (80 chapters)

== Reception and awards ==
Mystery has surrounded the members of Clamp as, in order to avoid being harassed by overzealous fans, they avoid making public appearances. In polls conducted by marketing research firm Oricon, Clamp was elected ninth most popular manga artist from Japan in 2007, while they were eighth in 2008, sharing the spot with Fujiko F. Fujio.

Gen Fukunaga, the president and CEO of Funimation, has praised Clamp as being "one of the most acclaimed groups of artists in Japan". According to Charles Solomon, a journalist for The New York Times, Clamp "ranks among the most successful creators of manga ... in Japan and the United States". Dallas Middaugh, associate publisher of Del Rey Manga, stated that Clamp was an integral part of "manga explosion" that has been occurring in the United States over the past few years. He also praised the group's artwork and storytelling style as having "struck a strong chord with male and female manga readers". The group was placed third after the winner for the Shogakukan Manga Award in the Children's category in 1999. Their work Cardcaptor Sakura won the Seiun Award for best manga in 2001. Almost 100 million Clamp tankōbon copies have been sold worldwide as of October 2007. Various of their selling series include xxxHolic and Tsubasa: Reservoir Chronicle that have sold over eleven million and twenty million volumes, respectively.

When asked about the universal popularity of Clamp's works, John Oppliger of AnimeNation stated that although it is "not based on originality [or] their artistic skill", they possess a distinct style that "perfectly mesh[es] the conventional attributes of shōnen and shōjo manga". He also pointed out that Clamp often "recycles" characters from their own earlier works, which gave rise to "a loosely defined 'Clamp Universe' that gives much of their work a unifying tone", and creates "absorbing, complex narratives that appeal to both male and female readers". All these factors result in "a cult following devoted to anything and everything the group publishes". The Anime Encyclopedia authors stated that "whatever Clamp are on, we'd like some".

Helen McCarthy in 500 Essential Anime Movies stated that Clamp's works "are among the most successful manga and anime with Western fans".
