= Tsubaki Nekoi =

Japanese manga artist

Tsubaki Nekoi 猫井 椿
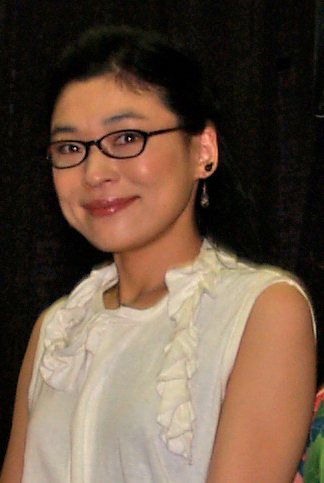
- Nekoi at Anime Expo 2006
- Born: January 21, 1969 (age 57) Kyoto, Japan
- Areas: Drawing characters, assists in character design, applying screentones, correcting manga illustrations
- Pseudonym: Mick Nekoi (猫井 みっく)
- Collaborators: Clamp

Tsubaki Nekoi (猫井 椿, Nekoi Tsubaki; born January 21, 1969), is a member of the all-female manga-creating team Clamp. She is the co-director and her duties in the team include applying screentones and correcting manga illustrations. She was also the lead artist (a role that normally falls to Mokona) on Legal Drug, The One I Love, Wish, Suki and xxxHolic. As the lead artist in xxxHolic, she is in charge of drawing the male characters while Mokona is responsible for the female characters.

For Clamp's 15th Anniversary in 2004, she and the other three members of Clamp changed their names because they reportedly wished to try new monikers.
