= Satsuki Igarashi =

Manga artist

Satsuki Igarashi いがらし 寒月
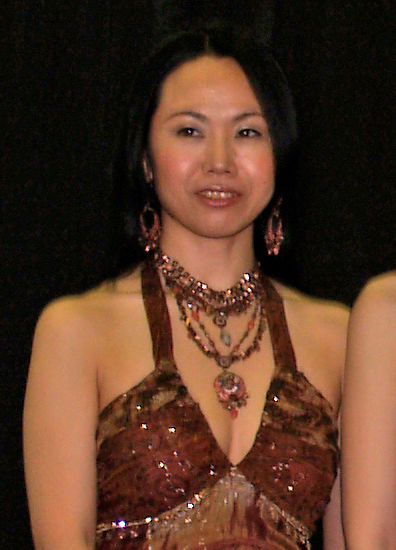
- Igarashi at Anime Expo 2006
- Born: February 8, 1969 (age 57) Kyōto, Japan
- Areas: Manga artist in charge of the design of the tankōbon, assistant to Mokona and Tsubaki Nekoi, production coordination, line artist, character designer
- Pseudonym: 五十嵐 さつき
- Collaborators: Clamp

Satsuki Igarashi (いがらし 寒月, Igarashi Satsuki; born February 8, 1969) is a member of the all-female manga-creating team Clamp.

== Manga career ==
Her duties in the Clamp team are acting as Nanase Ohkawa's sounding board, the character designer of Chobits and as the line artist for Tsubasa: Reservoir Chronicle.

Like the other members of Clamp, she changed her name as part of the group's 15th Anniversary, however, for her it was only changing the reading of her name in Japanese from 五十嵐 さつき to いがらし 寒月.

According to Clamp's The One I Love, Satsuki was bullied as a child in kindergarten by a group of boys. However, there was one boy who always stood up for her, and Satsuki developed a crush on him.
