= Mokona =

Manga artist

Mokona もこな
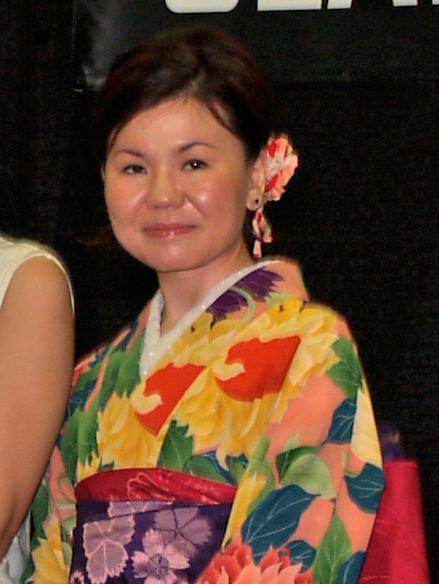
- Mokona at Anime Expo 2006
- Born: June 16, 1968 (age 58) Kyōto, Japan
- Areas: In charge of character design, illustrator, colorist, composition designer
- Pseudonym: 108 secret techniques
- Notable works: Tsubasa: Reservoir Chronicle; Tokyo Babylon; Magic Knight Rayearth; Cardcaptor Sakura
- Collaborators: Clamp

Mokona (もこな; born June 16, 1968) is the pen name of the lead artist, colorist, and composition designer of the all-female manga-artist team Clamp. She was formerly known as Mokona Apapa (もこな あぱぱ); she dropped her last name because she claimed it sounded too "immature". Clamp has had a huge impact on the "manga explosion" according to an account in The New York Times in 2006. Their artwork has been characterized as "wispy", "fluid", and "dramatic" which has resonated with both male and female demographic readers of manga. The Tsubasa manga sold over a million copies in the United States, and television programs and DVD spinoffs based on the concept have been successful as well.
