= Nanase Ohkawa =

Japanese manga artist

Nanase Ohkawa 大川七瀬
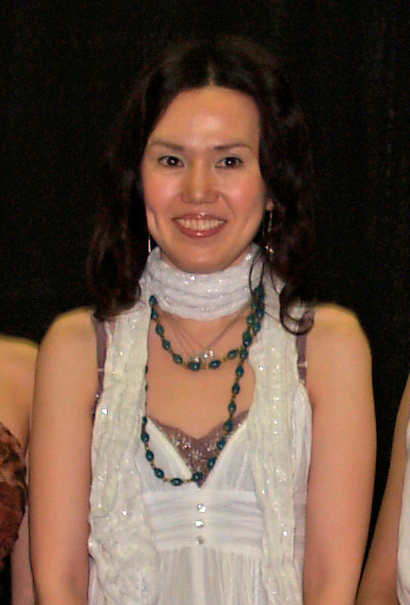
- Ohkawa at Anime Expo 2006
- Born: May 2, 1967 (age 59) Osaka, Japan
- Areas: Writing scripts, designing graphic novel covers, planning and sales
- Pseudonym: Ohkawa Ageha (大川 緋芭) (2004–2008)
- Collaborators: CLAMP

Nanase Ohkawa (大川 七瀬, Ōkawa Nanase; born May 2, 1967) is a member of the all-female manga-creating team Clamp. She is the director of the team and is primarily responsible for writing the stories and scripts for CLAMP's various works.

As part of CLAMP's 15th Anniversary, each of the four members changed their names reportedly because they wanted to try out the new monikers. Ohkawa changed her name to Ageha Ohkawa (大川 緋芭, Ōkawa Ageha) in 2004. Ohkawa still used her previous name for some of the scripts she wrote for animated series.

Ohkawa announced in her blog that from March 1, 2008, she should be addressed as Nanase Ohkawa again.

== Works ==
=== Manga ===
- Ohkawa has written all of the CLAMP manga series since 1980s.

=== Anime ===
- Ohkawa has also contributed majority of the anime adaptations of CLAMP's manga series:

Year	Title	Type	Credit	Note
1991–92	RG Veda	OVA	Script	
1994	Magic Knight Rayearth	Anime television series	Script (eps. 14–20), Series supervision	Season 1
1995	Magic Knight Rayearth	Anime television series	Series composition	Season 2
1995	Miyuki-chan in Wonderland	OVA	Script	
1996	X	Anime film	Screenplay, Planning	Co-written with Rintaro
1998–2000	Cardcaptor Sakura	Anime television series	Series composition, Script (eps. 1–3, 6, 8–9, 11, 13–14, 16–18, 20, 23–24, 27, 31, 34–37, 39–70)	
1999	Cardcaptor Sakura: The Movie	Anime film	Screenplay	
2000	Cardcaptor Sakura The Movie: The Sealed Card	Anime film	Screenplay	
2002	Chobits	Anime television series	Script (eps. 1), Theme Song Lyrics (ED2)	
2003	Chobits	OVA	Script	
2006	xxxHOLiC	Anime television series	Series composition, Script (eps. 7, 12, 17, 20), Executive Producer	Co-series composition with Michiko Yokote^{a}
2007–08	Tsubasa: Tokyo Revelations	OVA	Script (eps. 1–3)	^{a}
2008	xxxHOLiC: Kei	Anime television series	Series composition, Executive Producer	Co-series composition with Michiko Yokote^{a}
2009	Tsubasa: Spring Thunder Chronicles	OVA	Script (eps. 1–2)	
2009	xxxHOLiC: Spring Dreams Chronicle	OVA	Script (eps. 1–2)	
2009–2010	Kobato	Anime television series	Series composition, Script (eps. 1, 20)	Co-series composition with Michiko Yokote
2010–11	xxxHOLiC: Cage	OVA	Script (eps. 1–2)	
2011	Blood-C	Anime television series	Series composition, Script (eps. 1–12)	Co-written with Junichi Fujisaku
2012	Blood-C: The Last Dark	Anime film	Screenplay	Co-written with Junichi Fujisaku
2017	Cardcaptor Sakura: Clear Card Prologue: Sakura and the Two Bears	OVA	Script	
2018	Cardcaptor Sakura: Clear Card	Anime television series	Series composition, Script (eps. 1–22)	

- ^aCredited as "Ageha Ohkawa"
