= List of xxxHolic episodes =

Cover of the first DVD compilation from xxxHolic released by Funimation Entertainment.

The anime series xxxHolic and its sequels are based on Clamp's manga series with the same name and were developed by Production I.G. It revolves around Kimihiro Watanuki, a high-school student disturbed by his ability to see the supernatural. He meets Yūko Ichihara, a powerful witch, who owns a wish-granting shop. Watanuki requests to have his ability to see spirits removed and as payment, Yūko hires him to work in the shop, resulting in his encounter with various supernatural adventures.

The first season of anime television series adaptation of xxxHolic began airing on Tokyo Broadcasting System Television on April 6, 2006, in Japan and ended on September 28, 2006, with 24 episodes in total. Both the film and the anime series are directed by Tsutomu Mizushima. Ageha Ohkawa, Clamp's director and main scriptwriter, is executive producer of the TV series. The second season, xxxHolic: Kei (xxxHOLiC◆継, Horikku: Kei; literally "xxxHolic: Sequel"), began airing on TBS on April 3, 2008, in Japan and ended on June 26, 2008, with 13 episodes in total. The main staff and cast remains the same as in the first season. The first season's episodes were also collected in eight DVD volumes published between July 26, 2007, and February 21, 2008, while two DVD boxes were released on August 25, 2010, and October 27, 2010. The second season was released in seven DVD volumes between June 25, 2008, and December 17, 2008, while a second season DVD box was released in Japan only on January 26, 2011.

The first season was licensed by Funimation Entertainment in July 2007. A total of six DVDs were released between March 25, 2008, and October 21, 2008, featuring the first season's episodes, while a DVD box of the first season was released on July 28, 2009. On January 26, 2009, the series made its North American debut on the Funimation Channel.

A two-DVD original video animation (OVA), titled xxxHOLiC Shunmuki (xxxHOLiC 春夢記; literally "xxxHOLiC Spring Dreams Chronicle") was also released. The first DVD for this OVA was released on February 17, 2009, with the 14th volume of the Japanese manga. The second one was released alongside volume 15 on June 26, 2009. Another OVA titled xxxHolic Rō (×××HOLiC・籠; literally "xxxHolic Cage") was shipped with the 17th volume of the xxxHolic manga on April 23, 2010. A direct sequel OVA titled xxxHolic: Rō Adayume (×××HOLiC・籠 あだゆめ; literally "xxxHolic Cage Selfish Dream") was released on March 9. 2011, and was included with the nineteenth volume from the manga.

== Episode list ==
=== xxxHolic (2006) ===
No.	Title	Original release date
1	"The Inevitable"; Transliteration: "Hitsuzen" (Japanese: ヒツゼン)	April 6, 2006
2	"Falsehood"; Transliteration: "Kyogen" (Japanese: キョゲン)	April 13, 2006
3	"Angel"; Transliteration: "Enzeru" (Japanese: エンゼル)	April 20, 2006
4	"Fortune Telling"; Transliteration: "Uranai" (Japanese: ウラナイ)	April 27, 2006
5	"Game of Letters"; Transliteration: "Shiritori" (Japanese: シリトリ)	May 4, 2006
6	"Indulgence"; Transliteration: "Tandeki" (Japanese: タンデキ)	May 11, 2006
7	"Hydrangea"; Transliteration: "Ajisai" (Japanese: アジサイ)	May 18, 2006
8	"Contract"; Transliteration: "Keiyaku" (Japanese: ケイヤク)	May 25, 2006
9	"Pinky Promise"; Transliteration: "Yubikiri" (Japanese: ユビキリ)	June 1, 2006
10	"Lamplight"; Transliteration: "Tomoshibi" (Japanese: トモシビ)	June 8, 2006
11	"Confession"; Transliteration: "Kokuhaku" (Japanese: コクハク)	June 15, 2006
12	"Summer Shade"; Transliteration: "Natsukage" (Japanese: ナツカゲ)	June 22, 2006
13	"Transfiguration"; Transliteration: "Henbō" (Japanese: ヘンボウ)	June 29, 2006
14	"Seal"; Transliteration: "Fūin" (Japanese: フウイン)	July 6, 2006
15	"Release"; Transliteration: "Kaihō" (Japanese: カイホウ)	July 13, 2006
16	"Reunion"; Transliteration: "Saikai" (Japanese: サイカイ)	July 20, 2006
17	"Self-Mutilation"; Transliteration: "Jishō" (Japanese: ジショウ)	July 27, 2006
18	"Ground Cherry"; Transliteration: "Hōzuki" (Japanese: ホオズキ)	August 3, 2006
19	"Unreasonable"; Transliteration: "Rifujin" (Japanese: リフジン)	August 10, 2006
20	"Atonement"; Transliteration: "Aganai" (Japanese: アガナイ)	August 31, 2006
21	"Nail Clipper"; Transliteration: "Tsumekiri" (Japanese: ツメキリ)	September 7, 2006
22	"Temptation"; Transliteration: "Yūwaku" (Japanese: ユウワク)	September 14, 2006
23	"Choices"; Transliteration: "Sentaku" (Japanese: センタク)	September 21, 2006
24	"Reminiscence"; Transliteration: "Tsuioku" (Japanese: ツイオク)	September 28, 2006

=== xxxHolic: Kei (2008) ===
No. overall	No. in season	Title	Original release date
25	1	"Spider (Spiderweb)"; Transliteration: "Kumo no Su" (Japanese: 蜘蛛 クモノス)	April 3, 2008
26	2	"Left Eye"; Transliteration: "Hidarime" (Japanese: 左眸 ヒダリメ)	April 10, 2008
27	3	"Friend's Half (Half)"; Transliteration: "Hanbun" (Japanese: 朋分 ハンブン)	April 17, 2008
28	4	"Dream-Buying"; Transliteration: "Yumekai" (Japanese: 夢買 ユメカイ)	April 24, 2008
29	5	"Affinity (Kohane)"; Transliteration: "Kohane" (Japanese: 由縁 コハネ)	May 1, 2008
30	6	"Peace (Konohana)"; Transliteration: "Konohana" (Japanese: 平和 コノハナ)	May 8, 2008
31	7	"Water Cat (Water-Drawing)"; Transliteration: "Mizukumi" (Japanese: 水猫 ミズクミ)	May 15, 2008
32	8	"Ring (Whisper)"; Transliteration: "Sasayaki" (Japanese: 鈴音 ササヤキ)	May 22, 2008
33	9	"Rumor"; Transliteration: "Fūhyō" (Japanese: 流噂 フウヒョウ)	May 29, 2008
34	10	"No Return (Awareness)"; Transliteration: "Kizuki" (Japanese: 不戻 キヅキ)	June 5, 2008
35	11	"Secret (Alone)"; Transliteration: "Hitori" (Japanese: 秘事 ヒトリ)	June 12, 2008
36	12	"Truth"; Transliteration: "Hontō" (Japanese: 真実 ホントウ)	June 19, 2008
37	13	"Repayment"; Transliteration: "O-kaeshi" (Japanese: 報恩 オカエシ)	June 26, 2008

== OVA ==
=== xxxHolic Shunmuki ===
The opening theme of episode 1 is "Sofa" by Shikao Suga and the ending theme is "Cherish" by Azu. The opening theme of episode 2 is "Adayume" (あだゆめ; literally "Selfish Dream") by Shikao Suga and the ending theme is "Gomenne." (ごめんね。; literally "I'm Sorry") by Tiara.

No.	Title	Original release date
1	"First Part"; Transliteration: "Zenpen" (Japanese: 前編)	February 17, 2009
Watanuki and Dōmeki enjoy meal and drinks with the fortune teller, where Kohane is staying. There, it's explained that everyone changes with every meeting they experience with others, and that all four there, and even Yūko, have changed from meeting Watanuki. Later on, Haruka and Watanuki meet in a dream, in which Haruka asks Watanuki to look for something in the temple's storeroom. However, as they look around, they seemed to have stepped into the realm within the book by accident.
2	"Last Part"; Transliteration: "Kōhen" (Japanese: 後編)	June 23, 2009
Watanuki and Dōmeki continue to search for the four items that Haruka requested. There is a notable change in Watanuki, as he acts like he appreciates Dōmeki for once. Watanuki manages to find and unlock the items as Haruka had requested, which leads to an encounter with someone close to him. Later, Watanuki finds Yūko and vows to grant her wish.

=== xxxHolic Rō ===
The ending theme is "Kaze Nagi" (風なぎ; literally "Calmed Wind") by Shikao Suga.

No.	Title	Original release date
1	"Rō" (Japanese: 籠)	April 23, 2010
Watanuki finds Yūko being swallowed by shadows from the Dream World, as she states her death was halted a long time ago and thanks to two people's decision, she is able to pass on. Upon dying, Yūko tells Watanuki her wish is for him to go on existing. Several years later, Watanuki has become the new proprietor of Yūko's shop, taking care of Maru, Moro and Mokona. Domeki has taken a position at a university to study folklore while also assisting Watanuki and Kohane has become a student at the same university studying under Domeki. Due to Domeki's position, a series of events have occurred that requires Watanuki's services. As part of the request, Watanuki hears a recording from a girl that says "I'm back Watanuki" with Yūko's voice. Watanuki proceeds to rewind and re-listen to it as the screen fades to black and he finally replies "Welcome home, Yūko".
2	"Rō Adayume" (Japanese: 籠・あだゆめ)	March 9, 2011
Haruka, Domeki's grandfather, asks Watanuki to investigate Dōmeki's dreams. Once in the dreams, Watanuki starts seeing their adventures from Domeki's point of view. As he gets to the part where Yuko gave Dōmeki his magical egg, shadows within the dream start attacking Watanuki. He is able to destroy them, thus completing the task Haruka had set. When he meets back up with Haruka afterwards, Haruka comments how he always protected Dōmeki and knew of the problems occurring within his grandson's dreams. Accepting Haruka's constant teachings as his payment, Watanuki leaves the dreamworld wondering about what Yuko told Dōmeki when giving him the egg. Later, Watanuki meets with Dōmeki who is revealed to be engaged with Kohane.
