= List of Magic Knight Rayearth episodes =

Magic Knight Rayearth anime television series is based on the manga of the same title by manga artist group Clamp. The series was directed by Toshihiro Hirano at Tokyo Movie Shinsha (now TMS Entertainment), written by Keiko Maruo (season 1) and Nanase Ohkawa (season 2), character designed by Atsuko Ishida and music composed by Hayato Matsuo. It aired on Yomiuri TV on October 17, 1994, and ended on November 27, 1995. It was licensed in the U.S. by Media Blasters, now by Discotek Media and is dubbed by Bang Zoom! Entertainment. It was released on both VHS and DVD and now on Blu-ray.

== Episode list ==
=== First season (1994-1995) ===
| No. overall | No. in season | Title | Directed by | Written by | Original release date |
|---|---|---|---|---|---|
| 1 | 1 | "The Birth of the Legendary Magic Knights!"; Transliteration: "Densetsu no Majikku Naito Shidō" (Japanese: 伝説のマジックナイト始動) | Keitaro Motonaga | Keiko Maruo | October 17, 1994 |
During a field trip at Tokyo Tower, three girls from three different schools are transported to a medieval-like land named Cephiro. The girls introduce themselves as Hikaru Shidou, Umi Ryuuzaki and Fuu Hououji, who are all in the 8th grade regardless of how they look. They are then greeted by a wizard named Clef. Clef explains that their ruler, Princess Emeraude, was imprisoned by the High Priest, Zagato, high above the skies of Cephiro. Clef explains that their world was never like this before, that it is stable with Princess Emeraude's prayers holding everything together. He then explains that Princess Emeraude made it clear they are Legendary Magic Knights, who are destined to save their world. He then explains that they cannot leave until they fulfill the Princess' wish. Clef asks if they can use magic; when they say they can not, he grants it to them and begins teaching them. Watching from his fortress, Zagato sends Alcyone to stop the Magic Knights. Clef sees Alcyone, and she attacks. He blocks the attack and fends off Alcyone as he sends the girls away on a griffin. His last command is for them to go west to the Forest of Silence, to Presea's home. Alcyone goes after them, while Clef thinks about how they would do against Zagato. At that moment, Zagato shows up and fires a spell at Clef. Clef is turned into stone, and Zagato's spell breaks the ground around him. Clef begins to fall off the cliff. Alcyone charges towards the three. After a few attacks, Hikaru finally stands up and uses her "Fire Arrow" spell to defeat Alcyone.
| 2 | 2 | "Presea, the Master Smith in the Forest of Silence"; Transliteration: "Chimmoku no Mori no Sōshi Puresea" (Japanese: 沈黙の森の創師 プレセア) | Koichi Chigira | Keiko Maruo | October 24, 1994 |
Guided by Clef's words stuck in their head, they reach the Forest of Silence. They are dropped off by the griffin, and wonder how they'll get into the mansion, because it is surrounded by a wall with no doors. Fuu suggests knocking. Umi is very skeptical, but when Hikaru starts to knock on the wall, a door opens. They try to call for someone, but no one greets them. They have small argument about not being rude, and decide to enter without permission. They do not know it, but a monster crawling in the ground gets in behind them. The door shuts and they enter the mansion. They wander around a bit, until they hear noise coming from a room. It turns out to be a library, and they see a mess coming from someone behind the chair. They ask if the person is Presea, but when the chair turns around, it turns out that the "person" is a small rabbit-like creature called Mokona. Suddenly a cage drops on them, and a woman comes forward. The woman is extremely happy, thinking she's captured Mokona, the creature that has been always messing up her study. After thinking of ways to punish Mokona, she looks in the cage and is surprised to see three girls in it. Umi starts to complain about how it is not their fault they were captured since the women, whom they have figured out is Presea, did not answer the door. She explains how Hikaru just knocked and the door opened by itself. Presea is surprised, and tells them only the Legendary Magic Knights could have done that. The monster soon finds them and starts to attack them. Presea manages to let them escape from the cage, and Hikaru tries using her magic to kill it. But the magic does not work and they scream in fear. Presea then draws out her sword and slices the monster's head off. Presea then brings them to a room filled with weapons, since they obviously need them to fight back. After thinking they had to pay for them, Presea reveals she is just "loaning" the weapons to them... no charge. She then explains that for them to become true Magic Knights, they need to go to the Spring of Eterna to pick up the legendary ore, Escudo. What they did not know is that the monster was not killed, and it comes for them again. Presea closes the huge door and tells them to pick a weapon. The girls close their eyes, and they successfully choose their weapons. Both Hikaru and Umi gets swords (Hikaru's is a broadsword and Umi's is a rapier), while Fuu get a bow and arrows. The monster then breaks through the door. They try to kill it and manage to break it up into pieces. It then reassembles itself, and Fuu tells them it is probably made of mud. Hikaru then gets an idea for how to kill it. She asks Presea if they have a pond. Presea says there is one in the back, and the four of them head for it. Hikaru asks if she can use the table cloth as they pass through the kitchen. Presea tells her yes, as they head for the back. Outside Hikaru tells them to distract the monster as she hides behind a pillar. Umi and Fuu does so and Hikaru throws the cloth over the monster's head. Hikaru charges forward, knocking the monster in the pond, where it proceeds to die. They then get another surprise when the weapons suddenly disappear into their jewels on their gloves. Presea then tells them that the weapons will only appear when they are needed. Outside the wall, Presea tells them to go to Eterna. She then tells them they will be guided by Mokona, who knows the way. They part ways for now, and Presea hopes the Legendary Magic Knights save their land. The episode ends with Presea praying that the Princess is watching over the trio.
| 3 | 3 | "Ferio, the Handsome, Mysterious Swordsman"; Transliteration: "Nazo no Bishōnen Kenshi Ferio" (Japanese: 謎の美少年剣士 フェリオ) | Yoshikata Nitta | Keiko Maruo | October 31, 1994 |
While travelling to the Spring of Eterna, the girls run into a young man named Ferio who saves them from a monster. Ferio then offers to be their guide to get out of the Forest of Silence. They say no, and try to lose him, but he still follows them. The girls then discuss about him being their guide, but they can not trust him, due to the fact he is still a stranger. They let him be their guide and use their food as payment since they have no money. We then find out that Ferio was an entertainer, and Princess Emeraude saved his life when guards thought he stole in the castle. Princess Emeraude then told the guards that it was a gift to him. That is why he is on the quest to save Princess Emeraude. They then take rest in a large tent/room, thanks to Mokona. Hikaru wants to give Ferio food, who is outside, but Fuu tells Hikaru she'll do it. The reason is, Hikaru is too kind, and might invite him in to stay with them. Outside, Fuu gives him the food, and Ferio asks her to stay with him while he eats. She blushes and rushes back in. The next day, they look upon a lot of monsters surrounding a rock. They come up with a plan for Hikaru and Umi kill the monsters while Ferio and Fuu destroy the rock. Hikaru and Umi kill a lot of monsters, and Ferio charges forward to the rock. Suddenly he is frozen. He tells Fuu to not come closer, because the rock creates monsters. Fuu stands afar, and gets a clear shot, hitting and breaking the rock. Hikaru and Umi stop attacking the monsters, when they turn back into their true forms. At the end of the day, they are out of the forest, and thank Ferio for his help. Ferio then gives Fuu the gift that Princess Emeraude gave him. Umi is excited about the gift, but Ferio reveals Fuu gets a gift because he loves her and runs off.
| 4 | 4 | "Alcyone, the Vengeful Sorceress"; Transliteration: "Shūnen no Masōshi Arushiōne" (Japanese: 執念の魔操士 アルシオーネ) | Hajime Kamegaki | Osamu Nakayama | November 7, 1994 |
The girls run into what seems to be a deserted village. They are captured in a net, and find out that the villagers were hiding from the monsters corrupting their land. A monster then appears, forcing the villagers to go back into hiding. The girls get the monster's attention by hitting it when it goes after a little girl. The monster attacks them, accidentally setting them free and Hikaru defeats it with her magic. Umi is happy, and suggests hurrying to get to Eterna to get Escudo, but is suddenly attacked out of nowhere and falls to the ground. Hikaru runs to Umi, only to be challenge by Alcyone, who was the one who injured Umi with her Ice Arrows. Alcyone is confident of beating them, but Hikaru's anger only makes her stronger. In the middle of the fight, Umi slowly wakes up, and sees Hikaru battling for her sake. Umi turns to Mokona and wishes for magic, which Clef proceeds to teach her, communicating through Mokona. Umi stands up, and casts a "Water Dragon" spell that blasts Alcyone, who retreats. Umi once again falls down, and Hikaru goes to her. Hikaru thanks Umi for saving her. Fuu then wishes for magic to save Umi and, as with Umi, Clef teaches her through Mokona. She then casts a "Wind of Healing" spell that heals Umi.
| 5 | 5 | "Escudo, the Legendary Ore"; Transliteration: "Densetsu no Kōbutsu Esukūdo" (Japanese: 伝説の鉱物 エスクード) | Keitaro Motonaga | Osamu Nakayama | November 14, 1994 |
Alcyone begs Zagato for another chance to kill the Magic Knights, saying she has a plan. The girls reach a lake and think it is Eterna, but Mokona tells them it is not Eterna. A water monster then attacks them from the lake and Umi destroys it with her Water Dragon. The water that formed the monster rains on them as it falls apart, making them glow, and they brush off the glowing as they dry off. They head for Eterna, as Alcyone watches from afar, laughing to herself. They arrive at the place that Mokona says is Eterna, but they do not see anything other than a line floating in midair. Mokona wanders off to climb a pillar of rock and Hikaru follows. Hikaru calls to Umi and Fuu from the top of the rock pillar, saying that they have to see something. Umi and Fuu join her and are surprised to see a spring from the top of the rock. Fuu realizes that Eterna is a two-dimensional spring--you can see the spring from above, but from the side, it looks like a line. Mokona jumps into the spring and they follow him to get the Escudo. The girls are separated as they fall further into the spring, and each of them sees someone they care about greatly. Hikaru sees her dog, Hikari, Umi sees her parents, and Fuu sees herself. The girls are attacked by their loved ones, and would not fight back. They then hear Princess Emeraude's voice, asking them to consider if they are truly facing their loved ones. The girls all figure out that it is not actually their loved ones in front of them, and destroy the images with new spells. Hikaru gains the spell Red Lighting, Umi gains the spell Blue Tornado, and Fuu gains the spell Green Gale. As the images disappear, each girl has a piece of Escudo appear in front of her. They are excited, but they get an unexpected visitor... Alcyone. The girls then abruptly drop to the floor. Alcyone explains her water monster had a slow-acting poison in it. She then says that she has come for the Escudo, because only the Magic Knights would have been able to get it. The Escudo then rushes into their glove jewels and their armor gets upgraded. They then use their new spells to send Alcyone back. Then they head back to Presea, as she will make their new weapons to awaken the legendary Rune Gods. Alcyone begs for another chance, but Zagato sends her off, and sends Ascot off for his chance to kill the Magic Knights.
| 6 | 6 | "Lives at Stake - Presea's Weapons"; Transliteration: "Inochi o Kaketa Puresea no Buki" (Japanese: 命をかけたプレセアの武器) | Taro Hotani | Keiko Maruo | November 21, 1994 |
Ascot sends a caterpillar-like creature off to kill the Magic Knights. He then decides to take a nap while his creature kills them. The girls arrive at Presea's house in the Forest of Silence and give her the Escudo, along with their weapons. Presea starts to make their new weapons in another room when they hear the monster. The girls tells Presea to take care of making the Escudo weapons, while they handle the monster. The caterpillar attacks the Magic Knights, who are somewhat successful in defending themselves, but it then turns and heads into the house, going after Presea. Weakened by the effort she exerted, Presea finally completes the Escudo weapons, but the monster breaks into the room immediately after. The building starts to crumble because of the damage done by the monster and the ceiling falls on Presea. The girls enter the room right on the monster's heels and see Presea under a piece of the ceiling. The girls call for their new weapons and use them to kill the monster. They all rush to Presea who is at her last breath. She dies and Hikaru swears to avenge her. Ascot wakes up from his nap and calls for his creature, only to find its remains in the ruins of Presea's house. He swears he'll avenge the creature's death as well.
| 7 | 7 | "Ferio in Desperation - A Romance in the Desert"; Transliteration: "Sutemi no Ferio Sabaku no Koi" (Japanese: 捨て身のフェリオ砂漠の恋) | Koichi Chigira | Keiko Maruo | November 28, 1994 |
Clef calls out to the girls and tells them, with each earthquake that happens in Cephiro it means that Cephiro is falling. If Cephiro falls completely, they cannot go back to their world. He then tells then to become a Magic Knight, they would need to awaken the Rune God. Mokona knows the way to each one Ferio sees Ascot, planning an attack on the girls, and he tricks Ascot, by saying he would want to help. Ascot does not fall for it, and tells him if he could, bring the girls to him in the desert, where the monster would hopefully kill them. Ferio meets the girls, and lure them into the desert. The monster attacks, but Ferio finds out from Ascot, the monster can attack by sound. Using the orbs, the magical walkie-talkie like devices, Ferio calls the monster and lures it away from the girls. A small monster then gives the message to the girls, saying that Ascot has taken Ferio. If they want to save him, they need to go to the desert. They decide to sleep on it, thinking he would be safe. Fuu does not think so, and sneaks out in the middle of the night/early morning to save Ferio. Her sword grows in the process, and she manages to kill the monster, called Pajero. Ferio tells Fuu, if she had not notice by now, the orb is a communicator, and if she needs to talk to him, call him.
| 8 | 8 | "The Horrible Trap of Summoner Ascot"; Transliteration: "Shōkanshi Asukotto no Kyōfu no Wana" (Japanese: 召喚士アスコットの恐怖の罠) | Yoshikata Nitta | Osamu Nakayama | December 5, 1994 |
Hikaru, Umi and Fuu meet a new animal friend in the forest. But is this new friend more than meets the eye?
| 9 | 9 | "The Magic Knights' Greatest Crisis"; Transliteration: "Majikku Naito Saidai no Kiki" (Japanese: マジックナイト最大の危機!) | Hajime Kamegaki | Keiko Maruo | December 12, 1994 |
Alcyone manages to trick Ascot into freeing her from a barrier that was holding her against her will. Promising she would give power to one of his monsters so it would be strong enough to kill the Magic Knights. In an open field, Umi is still obsessed with her fencing competition that would have been a week away at the time they arrived in Cephiro, even though days, or maybe even weeks have already passed by. Hikaru suggests if you wish hard enough, maybe you can still make it to the competition, since Cephiro is a land of power. Both Hikaru and Fuu would wish for Umi too. A few yards away, Alcyone gives Ascot the power she promised to his monster, "Luci", which not only over powers it, but freezes itself, as well as Ascot. Hikaru, Umi and Fuu see the snow storm blasting their way, and Umi makes a wish before getting hit. She wants to return to Tokyo. Hikaru and Fuu suffer from hypothermia, and fall to the ground. Then Alcyone stops the weather and hopes that her plan on killing the Magic Knights worked. Until she realizes only two of them are present. Umi wakes up back in the Tokyo, and notices no one is moving. She rushes to a familiar face, her fencing captain, but as she soon realizes, she is not in the real Tokyo. Things start to dissolve around her, as reality sinks in. She is still in Cephiro. She appears before Alcyone, and the pair face off in a sword fight. Alcyone over powers her, but Umi is determined not to lose. She wishes to win, and her sword grows in the process. Umi uses her upgraded sword against Alcyone, which sends her running off. The sword manages to break the ice storm, as well as killing the monster. After Hikaru and Fuu finally regain consciousness, they are relieved Umi is unharmed. Umi then reminds them until they save Cephiro, they cannot return home.
| 10 | 10 | "Revival of Selece, the Legendary Rune-God"; Transliteration: "Yomigaeru Densetsu no Mashin Seresu" (Japanese: よみがえる伝説の魔神セレス) | Keitaro Motonaga | Osamu Nakayama | January 9, 1995 |
The girls reach a lake, and Mokona reveals that a Rune God rests within it. They travel underneath the water, to a place with air, thanks to Mokona's magic. Umi does not feel good, and starts to glow. She wanders off, and suddenly they notice a painting of a blue dragon, and Umi is cut off from Hikaru and Fuu behind when two large doors appear. Ascot then arrives with another one of his monsters, and battle the Hikaru and Fuu. They do not injure it much, but Fuu points out the glowing jewel on its head, and Hikaru breaks it. The monster becomes stunned, and Ascot comes out. He then goes on a tirade about how they all killed his monster friends. Hikaru tells him if they were his true friends, he would not hurt them or harm them by sending them into fights they could not win. The monster wakes up, and starts to go berserk on them. Ascot runs away, while Hikaru and Fuu fight it off. Meanwhile with Umi, the dragon tests her, by telling her to show her courage of the heart. She hear the screams of Hikaru and Fuu, and suddenly the doors disappear. It tells her to run away, but she does not. She wants to help them, she charges for the monster, but it fires back. Fuu then casts a new spell, "Protecting Wind", to protect Umi. Fuu then collapses, and the monster goes for Umi. The monster then goes for Hikaru after she draws its attention when hitting it with her "Red Lightning". Hikaru collapses, and Umi is crushed. She tells the dragon, if acquiring the dragon's power means running away, she does not want it. She wants to help her friends and rather die in the process of helping them. Suddenly the dragon turns into what looks like a robot, which defeats the monster. The machine then reveals the truth to Umi, she showed her true courage, and tells her she is not yet strong enough to wear him. Only when she becomes a true Magic Knights, will she be ready to dawn him in battle. He then turns into a ball of light and proceeds to enter Umi's armor, where it starts to grow. Hikaru and Fuu's armor proceed to do the same. The girls are only one step closer on saving Cephiro.
| 11 | 11 | "The Legend of the Rune-Gods - In Cephiro, Another World"; Transliteration: "Isekai Sefīro no Mashin Densetsu" (Japanese: 異世界セフィーロの魔神伝説) | Yorimichi Nakano | Keiko Maruo | January 16, 1995 |
The girls are flying off to the flying mountain, the very same mountain they first saw when they arrived in Cephiro. Inside the mountain holds the castle were Princess Emeraude is being held. When they almost reach it, they were attacked by Zagato, but then saved by Princess Emeraude. Ferio, while resting, pulls out his communicator. He then gets a message from Princess Emeraude to save the girls by the lake of Piraus Village. He does so, and they take rest there for a bit. Meanwhile, the villagers are being interrogated by a servant of Zagato named Caldina, who then demands money in exchange for leaving them alone. However Caldina changes her mind, upon seeing the girls and Ferio when they enter the village. The girls then tell the story of finding the first Rune-God, and they are ready to save Cephiro. He then reveals that they need to acquire two more Rune Gods to complete their journey before they can save Cephiro. They are then attacked by villagers, and Ferio takes one hostage. The villagers then explain that a servant of Zagato was forcing them to do so. Ferio then comes up with a plan for her to leave them alone, as well as the girls can escape quietly. Ferio goes to Caldina and offers her money. She is not fooled by his offer, but he reveals he wants to play cards. Caldina can not resist such an offer, and agrees to play. She ends up winning all of his money, and they are interrupted by the villagers. They reveal the girls escape, and blame Ferio. One of the villagers then takes a knife and stabs him. Caldina is shocked by this, she takes the money and runs off. Ferio stands up, as the villagers thank him. Back at home, Ascot passes Caldina's room, and he reveals to her that he does not wish anymore to kill the girls anymore. She then tell him, do not let his troubles get him down. Back with the girls, they rush off to find the other Rune Gods, as they exit the village. Fuu stops, and pulls out her communicator. She then gets a message from Ferio, saying their plan was successful and to call him once in a while, or he'd miss her. Fuu starts to blush, and Hikaru and Umi notices it. Fuu then starts to walk the wrong way but Hikaru corrects her as Fuu laughs at her mistake.
| 12 | 12 | "The Fearsome Illusionist Caldina"; Transliteration: "Osorubeki Genwakushi Karudina" (Japanese: 恐るべき幻惑士 カルディナ) | Hitoyuki Matsui | Osamu Nakayama | January 23, 1995 |
The girls are walking, when Mokona tells them to go up. Mokona then reveals a Rune God is up in one of the flying mountains. Caldina and Ascot catch up with them. Caldina tells Ascot she'll take care of everything, and tells him to wait for her. Caldina uses a spell to make the girls think the ground is soft and shaky, and that large rocks are falling on them. The girls panic, and fall to the bottom. They wake up and see a cave, when the ground continues to shake. Once inside, they see Clef, where he tells them he had saved Princess Emeraude, and she wants to talk to them. Fuu is not convinced, and warns the others. They cautiously enter another room, where they see Princess Emeraude, and two guards with her. Fuu then questions how they could defeat Zagato. Princess Emeraude and her two guards then turn into monsters, and proceed to attack them. Although the girls cannot hurt the monster, the monsters can hurt them. Hikaru, Umi and Fuu know it is only an illusion, and try to concentrate hard enough so that they would not get hurt. The monsters slowly disappear, but Umi is taken off guard, as she opens her eye. A monster proceeds to attack her, she screams, and runs to the door they came from. Reality sinks in as they realize they are outside, high in the air, and fall to the ground. Outside, Caldina then breaks a piece of the ledge, and the rock proceeds to fall on them. Mokona awakens from being dizzy, and wakes up Umi just in time. She breaks the rock, and pieces start to fly towards Caldina, knocking her unconscious. Ascot finds Caldina, and vows to kill the Magic Knights. He finds Umi and calls forth his monsters, who proceeds to grab the unconscious Hikaru and Fuu. Umi gets upset and draws her sword right onto Ascot's neck. She tells him to put them down. Ascot angrily shouts about how they killed his monster friends, and Umi proceeds to slap him. She start to explain that he can not keep treating the way he has or more of them might get hurt. The other girl wake up in the middle of her talk as Umi starts to explain how the girls, are her friends too, and would do anything to protect them. Umi then asks if they could be friends, and he agrees. She asks his name, and he introduces himself. Caldina wakes up and sees Ascot. She notes that he is acting very strangely, and she wonders what happened to him.
| 13 | 13 | "The Most Valuable Thing in this World"; Transliteration: "Kono Sekai de Ichiban Taisetsuna Mono" (Japanese: この世界でいちばん大切なもの) | Koichi Chigira | Osamu Nakayama | January 30, 1995 |
Caldina is determined to kill the girls in order to receive the pile of money she had been promised by Zagato. Ascot does not wish to harm the girls anymore, and tries to convince Caldina not to attack them but fails. Caldina uses her "bells" to hypnotize Hikaru and Umi against Fuu. Fuu uses her magic to hold them back, but does not know that Caldina is only a few steps away. Caldina reveals herself, and forces Fuu to attack Hikaru and Umi. Ascot blocks an attack, and Caldina stops and freezes him. Fuu breaks through, and hits Caldina with a spell. A moment after, Caldina and Fuu start to talk. Fuu explains, even though they do not know each other well enough, she cares for them. Fuu uses Ascot as an example, and Caldina seems to understand. Caldina unfreezes Ascot, and Hikaru and Umi wake up. They want to attack her, but Fuu stops them. She then explains everything about what just happened with Caldina. Caldina and Ascot then proclaim that they are not going back to the castle and run off. Fuu then uses her spell to heal each other, and it is one closer step on bringing Zagato and his servants down.
| 14 | 14 | "Hikaru, Umi, and Fuu's Unyielding Wish"; Transliteration: "Hikaru, Umi, Fū no Yuzurenai Negai" (Japanese: 光、海、風のゆずれない願い) | Hajime Kamegaki | Nanase Ohkawa | February 6, 1995 |
After battling a fierce monster, the girls discover that Mokona is able to project a map of the land of Cephiro. They soon find out that they need to head for the skies for the other Rune Gods. Soon after a bright light appears, kidnapping Umi and Fuu. A projection of Clef appears and tells Hikaru how there are unusual monster in the world, and the flash of light may be one of them. Hikaru remembers the map, and Mokona projects it again. She heads towards Umi and Fuu's way and manages to get cut along the way due to thorns. Mokona catches up with her, and notices the blood. Soon after the light is after Hikaru, but Mokona pushes Hikaru out of the way and in he goes into the light, while Hikaru falls into a ravine. Hikaru climbs up, and falls down, and manages to get hit in the head by some rocks. She slowly figures out of the light monster works, and remembers that Umi and Fuu were bleeding at the time they were kidnapped. Injured but still determined, she reaches the top. The light then comes after her, and with her sword she kills the monster. She faints, as Umi and Fuu awake from their sleep like state. Hikaru slowly wakes up, and Umi and Fuu are extremely happy she is not dead. Hikaru then explains about the monster and its attraction to blood. Fuu then heals all of them, and they look onto the mountain holding the next Rune-God they need to get.
| 15 | 15 | "The Second Rune-God: Windam, the Lord of the Skies"; Transliteration: "Dai Ni no Mashin—Kūjin Windamu" (Japanese: 第二の魔神·空神 ウィンダム) | Keitaro Motonaga | Keiko Maruo | February 13, 1995 |
In Cephiro's very first storm, the girls take refuge in a cave, near the sky shrine, where another Rune-God is waiting. When Fuu starts to worry about Ferio, she brings out her communicator, only to be called by him. He tells them, he is nearby, and wishes to take refuge with them. Just before entering the cave, Ferio notices a girl lying on the ground, holding an herb. Fuu is excited when she sees Ferio's silhouette, but is crushed when he sees him carrying a girl. The girl then wakes up, and introduces herself as Selah. She starts to explain she lives on the bottom of the mountain, and needed the herb she had to cure her brother's fever. They then all take rest, but Fuu can not sleep. When she is about to talk to Ferio, Selah beats her to it. Ferio offers her some soup, she not only says yes, but offers to put the herb in it. She then gives it to Ferio to taste. He makes a comment on how delicious the soup is, and would save her lots of times just to have this dish. The next day, Ferio comes down with a fever, and the group believes that it must have been caused by the storm. Fuu is angry at Ferio, but tires to see past it, and tells Selah to watch him while they go to the mountain. Ferio then falls to the ground, and Selah reveals her true intentions. Selah reveals herself as Innova in disguise. She then captures Ferio, and holds him hostage in the cave. He then reveals that the herb was actually a toxic plant. He then leaves to kill the girls. The girls get onto the flying shire, thanks to Mokona's flying. Fuu starts to act strangely around them, and then begins to disappear. Hikaru explains to Umi that she was acting the same when she acquired her Rune God, so that they should not worry. They start to run to the other side of shrine, only to be greeted by Innova. A great winged creature appears before Fuu and tells her she must be tested before he can accept her as a Magic Knight, calling himself "Windam". She is then transported back to the shrine grounds, only to see Hikaru and Umi falling as they try to defend themselves. Fuu shows her true self, and the giant bird turns into the Rune-God. With its great power, Windam sends Innova crawling back to Zagato. When Hikaru and Umi finally awaken, they all notice that their swords and armor have changed and grown. They return to the cave, where Ferio tells Fuu to forget about him, saying that he was the one who caused all of this. He runs away, and Fuu can not help to cry. Hikaru tells Fuu to not forget Ferio, but always keep him in her heart. Back with Innova, he begs Zagato use his power to change him into his true form. Zagato not only refuses, but calls forward on a stronger-looking warrior, named Lafarga.
| 16 | 16 | "A Powerful Foe! Lafarga the Swordmaster"; Transliteration: "Kyōteki! Kentōshi Rafāga" (Japanese: 強敵! 剣闘士ラファーガ) | Hitoyuki Matsui | Osamu Nakayama | February 20, 1995 |
Zagato informs Princess Emeraude that he is using mind control to send one of the Princess' own swordsmen to kill the girls. She begs Zagato to stop, but he does not listen. Meanwhile, the girls are traveling to the volcano-like shrine to revive Hikaru's Rune-God, only to be attacked by a large flying bird. They try to fight it off with their swords, but it is of no use. It then takes a hold of Umi, who loses her swords and flies off with her. Fuu tries to return Umi her sword, but Umi's sword turns into water when Fuu tries to pick it up. Fuu only has one choice, and throws her own sword to Umi. Umi catches it, but is too heavy. She tries to hold onto it, but drops it instead. The bird continues to fly, and a man appears and kills the bird. Hikaru and Fuu catch Umi, and she comments how heavy Fuu's sword is. Fuu then holds it, noting it is as light as a feather to her. Then they soon realize that the swords have been made specially for each other, and them alone. Anyone else who tries to use them would not be able to. Once she is recovered Umi wishes to thank the man who rescued her, and they see Lafarga standing before them. He then proceeds to attack them, and manages to trap Umi and Fuu. Hikaru and Lafarga battle, and Hikaru hits his sword far away. Lafarga over powers Hikaru, and tries to use her sword against her, but gets burned in the process. Lafarga's memories slowly come back to him, and he asks them who are they. They respond they are the Magic Knights, and he is amazed. He too, being the captain of the Royal Guard, tells them he will find a way to help them save Princess Emeraude, and wanders off, while the girls head to revive Hikaru's Rune-God.
| 17 | 17 | "The Truth About Innova, and the Return of Memories"; Transliteration: "Inōba no Shōtai to Yomigaeru Kioku" (Japanese: イノーバの正体とよみがえる記憶) | Yorimichi Nakano | Nanase Ohkawa | February 27, 1995 |
Again Innova approaches Zagato and begs him to return him to his true form. To his surprise and much deliberation Zagato does, and Inouva transforms into a large wolf-like creature. Innova then leaves to go after the girls. Meanwhile Ferio has been experiencing previously unknown memories slowly coming back to him, and remembers that he is Princess Emeraude's younger brother. He then runs to find the girls. The girls are surprised when they encounter Beast-Innova and he reveals his true nature to them before attacking. The girls are not doing well, and when all seems lost, Ferio communicates thru the orb, and tells them that Inouva's weak spot is the jewel on his head. Hikaru manages to hit the jewel on Beast-Innova's head, killing him. Ferio finally reaches them, and sees the girls triumph over Innova, and tells them to save Cephiro. With everyone gone, Alcyone begs Zagato to let her try and kill the girls one last time, but he just leaves her begging.
| 18 | 18 | "The Last Rune-God: Rayearth, the Lord of Fire"; Transliteration: "Saigo no Mashin—Enjin Reiāsu" (Japanese: 最後の魔神·炎神 レイアース) | Koichi Chigira | Osamu Nakayama | March 6, 1995 |
Alcyone spies upon Zagato, as he talks with Princess Emeraude. She notices that he not once has harm her in any way, they merely talk. Alcyone starts having doubts about Zagato's reason for his "kidnapping" of the princess. Mokona leads the girls into a hot volcano where the last Rune God is being waiting. Umi and Fuu start to get worried about Hikaru when she begins acting strangely, and disappears before their eyes. She wakes up in a room full of fire, then, out of the flames appears a wolf made of fire. Identifying himself as Rayearth, he tells her he wishes to test her "courage of heart". While this happening, Zagato manages to get inside the volcano. He then follows where Hikaru had just gone in. He strips Umi and Fuu's powers, just in time for Hikaru to get back. Hikaru and Zagato talk for a moment, and he takes her power as well, and he fires a fireball towards Umi and Fuu. Hikaru shields them, and he tries to fire another. This time Lafarga steps in and shields Hikaru. Zagato hits Lafarga once more, and Lafarga falls due to the heat. Umi and Fuu slowly regain consciousness, and take notice of their surroundings. They both scream when Zagato unleashes a lethal magical blast at Hikaru, but she is shielded at the last moment by a pillar of flame. Suddenly Rayearth's voice can be heard, he then appears in front of them, attacking Zagato, who retreats. The groups magic is then restored by Rayearth, and the girls get back their powers. Down below, they see Mokona as well as Lafarga, and are happy they are only a few steps away in saving Cephiro and returning home.
| 19 | 19 | "Showdown! The Magic Knights Versus Zagato"; Transliteration: "Taiketsu! Majikku Naito bāsasu Zagāto" (Japanese: 対決! 魔法騎士 vs ザガート) | Hajime Kamegaki | Nanase Ohkawa | March 13, 1995 |
The girls start to head towards the flying mountain in the sky along with the Rune-Gods Celes, Windam and Rayearth. They remember the good times they'd had, and some of the bad since they'd arrived in Cephiro. They then receive a message from Princess Emeraude, telling them to grant her wish and save Cephiro. They finally reach the flying mountain, only to find Zagato in his own Rune God, blocking their way and preventing them from going any further. They at first demand he release the princess, but he refuses. He then claims that he will kill them all. They fight, and Zagato holds firm. Injuring them all, but when it looks like they will fail, the girls and Rune-Gods combine all of their powers into three spells, Red Lightning, Dragon Water and Green Gale. They fire their super spell at Zagato, and it destroys his Rune-God facsimile, killing him. Meanwhile, in her prison, Princess Emeraude screams in horror as she realizes that Zagato has died.
| 20 | 20 | "The Unbelievable Truth About the Legendary Magic Knights!"; Transliteration: "Densetsu no Majikku Naito! Kyōi no Shinjitsu" (Japanese: 伝説の魔法騎士! 驚異の真実) | Keitaro Motonaga | Nanase Ohkawa | March 13, 1995 |
The girls head to the inner sanctum of the castle where a woman, looking much like Princess Emeraude, stands. After mentioning Zagato's name, she goes berserk, and creates her own Rune-God. She starts to attack them, and they fly out of the castle totally confused. Once outside, they get into a battle with the Rune-God, and learn the truth from Princess Emeraude, she "is" the one attacking them. She tells them, how her falling in love with Zagato was forbidden for the Pillar, who was only supposed to watch over Cephiro, and imprisoned herself so that her feelings would not get in the way of her duties. But it was too late for that, and she reveals in order to save their land, and fulfill her wish, they would have to kill her. She then reveals no one from Cephiro would be strong enough to kill her, so that is why she summoned them. After attacking them, Rayearth, Windam, and Celes combine into one Rune-God, and manage to kill Emeraude. Then a great light appears, and the girls see Princess Emeraude and Zagato together. Back in the Tokyo Tower, everyone is now relieved that the huge light has passed. Hikaru's friend tries to ask Hikaru her opinion, but to her surprise Hikaru is hugging Umi and Fuu. As their classmates look on confused, Hikaru, Umi, and Fuu hug and cry. They are not happy that they had to kill Princess Emeraude. Hikaru tells them, it was not a dream and that she wants to go back to Cephiro to set things right.

=== Second season (1995) ===
| No. overall | No. in season | Title | Directed by | Written by | Original release date |
|---|---|---|---|---|---|
| 21 | 1 | "A Departure and New Ties"; Transliteration: "Tabidachi to Aratana Kizuna" (Japanese: 出発(たびだち)と新たな絆) | Hitoyuki Matsui | Nanase Ohkawa | April 10, 1995 |
The girls are still down over having to slay Princess Emeraude so she could be with Zagato in the afterlife and free of her duty as the Pillar of Cephiro. Though their families try to help cheer them up, that evening, the girls meet back up at Tokyo Tower to think about what happened and how they left Cephiro without Emeraude to keep it healthy and prosperous. When Hikaru wants to go back and set things right, they suddenly find themselves once more being transported to Cephiro. After being saved from falling by a large flying fish, it takes them to the palace, where they reunite with Clef and Mokona. Clef reveals that when Emeraude died, with no new Pillar to pray for Cephiro's well-being, the world is collapsing on itself. Only the palace seems to remain unharmed. Worse, Clef reveals that Cephiro is now being attacked by its three rival nations to claim the power of the Pillar, with the flagship of Autozam appearing in the stormy skies with Eagle Vision at the helm.
| 22 | 2 | "Cephiro and the Three Countries"; Transliteration: "Sefīro to Mittsu no Kuni" (Japanese: セフィーロと三つの国) | Keitaro Motonaga | Nanase Ohkawa | April 17, 1995 |
With Cephiro falling apart without Emeraude praying for its well-being anymore, it is being attacked by its three rival nations: Autozam, Fahren, and Chizeta, for control of the Pillar System. Autozam's forces are led by Eagle Vision with his second Geo and chief engineer Zazu, Fahren's by Lady Aska, first princess of the kingdom, with assistant Sanyun and advisor Chang Ang, and Chizeta's by the twin sisters and crown princesses, Tatra and Tarta. The girls are reunited with an apparently resurrected Presea. Clef restores the girls' armor and weapons, which initially look like their original base armor, but becomes their full-fledged final armor with the capes and crowns when they pilot Rayearth, Windam, and Selece into battle as they begin their fight to protect Cephiro from their rival nations.
| 23 | 3 | "Autozam's Invasion and Lantis"; Transliteration: "Ōtozamu no Shinkō to Rantisu" (Japanese: オートザムの侵攻とランティス) | Shinji Takagi | Nanase Ohkawa | April 24, 1995 |
The Magic Knights and the Rune Gods do battle with Eagle Vision and his robot FTO. When he realizes who they are, Eagle Vision withdraws. The girls return to the castle where they're reunited with Ferio, revealed to be Emeraude's brother, Caldina, Lafarga and Ascot, aged up due to a crush on Umi. They also meet Lantis, the brother of Zagato, and his fairy companion Primera. That night, Hikaru dreams of a shadowy woman and a girl with her face.
| 24 | 4 | "Magic Knights and the Battleship NSX"; Transliteration: "Majikku Naito to Senkan Enuesuekkusu" (Japanese: 魔法騎士と戦艦NSX) | Yorimichi Nakano | Nanase Ohkawa | May 1, 1995 |
Umi, Fuu and Hikaru tell Clef, Ferio and Lantis about how torn up the others are about what they did and what happened to Cephiro, Emeraude and Zagato. Lantis tells Hikaru he doesn't blame her for Zagato's death. Before he can say what he truly blames, Primera interrupts him. Clef alerts Hikaru that the Autozam battleship NSX is approaching the palace. The Magic Knights head off to confront Eagle Vision to find out why he's come to Cephiro but are attacked by Alcyone.
| 25 | 5 | "Hikaru and Nova in the Dream"; Transliteration: "Hikaru to Yume no Naka no Nova" (Japanese: 光と夢の中のノヴァ) | Yasuchika Nagaoka | Nanase Ohkawa | May 8, 1995 |
The Magic Knights fight Alcyone as their allies and Eagle Vision's group watch. Hikaru pleads with her to join their forces but Alcyone becomes possessed by the shadowy woman from Hikaru's dream. The woman declares that Cephiro will fall to despair and thus belong to her. Hikaru is contacted by the girl from her dreams, who identifies herself as Nova and that she was made from Hikaru. Nova promises to see Hikaru soon and Alcyone is teleported away. Umi and Fuu notice how shaken Hikaru is but she continues on to the NSX. Their allies discuss how Alcyone's monster wasn't from Cephiro, which Primera confirms. The Magic Knights land on the NSX and meet face-to-face with Eagle Vision. They ask why he's invading Cephiro and he answers that he's come to the seize the power of the Pillar. Their discussion is interrupted by the leader of the Fahren forces, who also wants the power of the Pillar.
| 26 | 6 | "The Magic Knights and Aska of Fahren"; Transliteration: "Majikku Naito to Fāren no Asuka" (Japanese: 魔法騎士とファーレンのアスカ) | Hitoyuki Matsui | Nanase Ohkawa | May 22, 1995 |
Aska, leader of Fahren, declares her intent to become princess of Cephiro. Eagle Vision reenters FTO and flies off to confront her and the Magic Knights follow. Aska's servants Sang Yung and Chang Ang alert her of the robots' approach to their dragon-shaped battleship, the Dome. Aska desires the Rune Gods but upon realizing the presence of the FTO means that Autozam is also trying to obtain the power of the Pillar, she flies into a rage, draws a picture of a dragon, brings it to life and sends it out to attack. The monster battles the Magic Knights but vanishes when one of its attacks hits the Dome. Sang Yung convinces Aska to retreat. When they leave, Eagle Vision tells the Magic Knights he recorded all the data from the battle and departs. Despite the grim circumstances, the girls vow to stand together and fight to defend Cephiro when Hikaru is contacted by Nova again. Nova promises to ensure Hikaru will always be with her friends by making sure they die together. Hikaru does not tell Umi and Fuu what just happened. Back at the palace, Lantis visits a room containing Emeraude's crown and vows to end the legend of the Magic Knights.
| 27 | 7 | "The Secret of the Pillar of Cephiro"; Transliteration: "Sefīro no Hashira no Himitsu" (Japanese: セフィーロの柱の秘密) | Yukio Okazaki | Nanase Ohkawa | June 5, 1995 |
Hikaru has a dream of the shadowy woman trying to take Emeraude's crown. Umi and Fuu tell Hikaru that she can confide in them when she is contacted by Nova again. Nova says she hates and will kill everyone Hikaru loves and that Hikaru will meet her soon. The palace is hit by an earthquake as another part of Cephiro vanishes. Umi asks Clef how a Pillar is selected and he takes them to the room containing Emeraude's crown, which Hikaru recognizes from her dream. Clef explains that the crown chooses its owner, it can only be touched by the one worthy of becoming the Pillar and it can only be worn by one with the strength of heart that can support Cephiro. If a worthy one approaches the crown, it will change a shape suitable for its new master. Ferio warns that anyone unworthy who approaches the crown will be killed by the room's living water. Clef says the worthy one does not have to be from Cephiro, the room is on the topmost floor of the castle and protected by a powerful barrier and the door can only be opened by three magic items: his ring, the magic armor worn by Zagato or a magic sword once wielded by Lantis. Hikaru plans to leave the castle by herself to search for someone worthy of being the Pillar, which everyone objects to. She tries to assuage them by saying she'll take Lantis with her but Clef tells them how he'd spent time in Autozam and he still has the magic sword. Hikaru stands by her decision to take him with her. Meanwhile, at a dark palace, the shadowy woman is revealed to be named Lady Debonair. She prepares Nova and Alcyone for their next move.
| 28 | 8 | "Hikaru and Lantis' Dangerous Journey"; Transliteration: "Hikaru to Rantisu no Kiken na Tabi" (Japanese: 光とランティスの危険な旅) | Keitaro Motonaga | Nanase Ohkawa | June 12, 1995 |
Hikaru and Lantis defeat a group of Monsters, Hikaru noting how much stronger they are. Lantis says they are a manifestation of the peoples' fear. Back at the castle, Umi and Fuu ask Clef for more information about Lantis. Clef tells them he taught Lantis and Zagato both magic and assigned Zagato as high priest and Lantis as captain of the guard until he suddenly left Cephiro. Out in the wilderness, Lantis shields Hikaru from a rainstorm and Hikaru asks him about his travels but is interrupted by a jealous Primera. A hole in the clouds suddenly opens up and the FTO descends through it. Hikaru summons Rayearth and Eagle Vision notices Lantis while scanning it. Eagle and Hikaru battle until Lantis interrupts the fight. He tells Eagle to stop fighting and that the Pillar system is not almighty. Eagle knocks Hikaru out and takes her away with him. Before Lantis can do anything, he's stopped by Alcyone. Lantis demands to know more about Lady Debonair but Alcyone becomes distracted by his resemblance to Zagato and attacks him. At the palace, Umi and Fuu sense that Hikaru is in danger.
| 29 | 9 | "Eagle and a Captive Hikaru"; Transliteration: "Īguru to Torawareta Hikaru" (Japanese: イーグルと捕われた光) | Yorimichi Nakano | Nanase Ohkawa | June 19, 1995 |
Umi and Fuu head out to look for Hikaru. Meanwhile, Lantis defeats Alcyone and goes after Hikaru. Hikaru has another dream about Nova and awakens aboard the NSX, dressed in Autozam attire, before being taken to meet Eagle Vision and Geo by Zazu. As Umi and Fuu continue to look for her, they discuss Hikaru's recent behavior. Eagle and Hikaru talk about Lantis and his time in Autozam, where he defeated Eagle and the FTO in combat. He also mentions that he betrayed Lantis. Hikaru asks why Eagle Vision is attacking Cephiro, and he tells her that Autozam is completely automated and powered by mental energy but they have reached their limit. He hopes that the Pillar system will be able to support Autozam. Hikaru tries to tell him about the Pillar system, but Eagle says Lantis already told him about it. Lantis soon arrives to rescue Hikaru, but during the fight between him and Eagle, Hikaru is abducted to face off with Nova.
| 30 | 10 | "Nova and Regalia, Rune-God of the Devil"; Transliteration: "Nova to Akuma no Mashin Regaria" (Japanese: ノヴァと悪魔の魔神レガリア) | Keitaro Motonaga | Nanase Ohkawa | June 26, 1995 |
Nova expresses delight at finally getting to meet Hikaru face-to-face, having been granted permission by her mother, Debonair. She attacks Hikaru, giggling over how much she loves her and that she's from none of the foreign lands. Hikaru tries to fight back but Nova reveals that she can use the same magic as her and that she is the same as her. Nova's Rune-God Regalia arrives and Hikaru summons Rayearth. As the two battle, they're spotted by Umi and Fuu who intervene. Angered by this, Nova takes them all to an alternate dimension of her own creation to kill Umi and Fuu. As they fight, Nova explains Debonair's plans for Cephiro. Debonair herself then arrives, Hikaru recognizing her from her dreams. She orders Nova to destroy the Magic Knights, giving Regalia a new weapon before departing. The three fight but their attacks have little effect on Regalia who easily overpowers them, to the point that Rayearth has to eject Hikaru. Having defeated Hikaru, Nova leaves. Umi and Fuu take Hikaru back to palace and she collapses in shock that Nova was able to break her sword.
| 31 | 11 | "Chizeta's Mobile Fortress and a Powerless Hikaru"; Transliteration: "Chizēta no Idō Yōsai to Tatakaenai Hikaru" (Japanese: チゼータの移動要塞と戦えない光) | Hitoyuki Matsui | Nanase Ohkawa | July 3, 1995 |
Aska prepares to attack again when she sees another ship, the Bravada from Chizeta. On board the twin princesses Tarta and Tatra plan to attack Cephiro themselves. In the palace, the Magic Knights meet up with Presea, Caldina and Ascot, who report that Alcyone has been imprisoned following her defeat from Lantis. Hikaru tells Presea that her sword was broken, much to her amazement. Hikaru also says that Rayearth vanished when the sword was broken. Caldina suggests they all take a bath to cheer themselves up. Meanwhile, Clef, Lafarga, Ferio and Lantis interrogate Alcyone. She tells them about Lady Debonair and how she is always nearby, which confuses the group. During the girls' bath, Caldina points out a mark on Presea's chest which she hides. Ascot then alerts them to the arrival of the Bravada, which Caldina recognizes due to being from Chizeta. Umi and Fuu go off to meet it. On the ship, Tarta and Tatra discuss their plans to turn Cephiro into a colony due to Chizeta's small size. They see Selece and Windam approaching and summon their guardian djinn, Rakoon and Rasheen, to fight them. Aska, Hikaru and the Magic Knights' allies watch the fight, Hikaru devastated that she's unable to help. Clef and Lantis both ponder about Debonair.
| 32 | 12 | "Umi and Fuu & Fahren and Chizeta"; Transliteration: "Umi—Fū to Fāren—Chizēta" (Japanese: 海·風とファーレン·チゼータ) | Yukio Okazaki | Nanase Ohkawa | July 10, 1995 |
Umi and Fuu continue to fight Rakoon and Rasheen. Selece and Windam explain to them who the djinn are and their relationship to Tarta and Tatra. Hikaru despairs over not being able to help her friends as she can't summon Rayearth with her sword broken. Eventually, the djinn are able to subdue the Rune Gods and Tarta orders them to be brought to the Bravada. Aska intervenes by creating a giant Sang Yung who takes the Rune-Gods from the djinn. Tarta and Tatra resummon them and have the two attack the giant Sang Yung. As the three battle, Selece and Windam tell Umi and Fuu that both countries' princesses are capable of becoming the Pillar. Aska orders the giant Sang Yung to capture the Rune Gods. It grabs Fuu, downs Umi with an energy beam and returns to the Dome. Rakoon and Rasheen catch Umi and take her to the Bravada. Hikaru agrees to revive her sword with Presea, despite the warning that she could lose her life in the process. Meanwhile, Emeraude's crown begins to glow and Nova tells Debonair that she found a new feeling deep within Hikaru. Lantis senses the evil presence growing stronger and Eagle Vision learns that the Magic Knights have been separated, with Hikaru being the one in the castle.
| 33 | 13 | "Hikaru's Wish and Presea's Secret"; Transliteration: "Hikaru no Negai to Puresea no Himitsu" (Japanese: 光の願いとプレセアの秘密) | Hitoyuki Matsui | Nanase Ohkawa | July 17, 1995 |
Hikaru sits alone, hoping that Rayearth, Umi and Fuu are alright. Meanwhile, Caldina and Lafarga try to stop Ascot, who wants to save Umi and Fuu due to being in love with Umi and wanting to repay the Magic Knights for showing him kindness and to make up for everything he did while serving Zagato. Caldina is forced to put him to sleep. Presea tells Clef that she's decided to help Hikaru revive her sword. Clef tells her that it'll require a great amount of willpower and their hearts will have to become one, the risk to their lives very high. Presea says she will still do it, revealing that she is actually her sister Sierra. The ruse was to spare the feelings of Ascot and the Magic Knights. Clef gives his blessing and Sierra departs, confessing to Mokona that she and Presea were both in love with Clef. Ferio swears to save Fuu while Primera searches for Lantis, catching a glimpse of Nova. Sierra goes to Hikaru's room and restates the dangers of reviving her sword but Hikaru remains steadfast, wanting to fight with Rayearth and her friends again. The two begin, Sierra telling Hikaru that she will have to fight herself and that she must believe in herself at all times. Hikaru sees when she, Umi and Fuu were first transported to Cephiro and their past battles while contemplating on what would've happened if they hadn't come together. Nova suddenly appears, telling Hikaru she never would've encountered hardships without them. Hikaru refutes that she doesn't blame Umi and Fuu for them. Nova continues to press on how she wouldn't be feeling pain or faced misfortunes if she hadn't come back to Cephiro. Nova brings up how they killed Zagato and Princess Emeraude which weakens Hikaru's resolve. Nova tells Hikaru it was all Emeraude's fault for summoning her, telling her to forget Cephiro and repeating her love for her. She ultimately embraces Hikaru. Sierra pleads with Hikaru not to go that way as darkness begins to envelop her.
| 34 | 14 | "Hikaru and Friendships Torn Apart"; Transliteration: "Hikaru to Hikisakareta Yūjō" (Japanese: 光と引き裂かれた友情) | Yorimichi Nakano | Nanase Ohkawa | July 24, 1995 |
Sierra begs Hikaru not to go to the shadows as darkness covers her. Within, Nova tells Hikaru to only think of and focus on her. When Hikaru continues to talk about Umi and Fuu, Nova messes with her memories, changing them into Umi and Fuu blaming Hikaru for being summoned to Cephiro and saying that they don't care about Cephiro. Hikaru rejects the false memories, accompanied by a light from Emeraude's crown. Nova creates an apparition of Lantis and mocks Hikaru for being in love with him. This breaks Hikaru's resolve and she falls further into darkness. Lantis hears Hikaru call out his name as Clef senses Nova's presence, noting that it's Hikaru's. Lantis assures Mira that Hikaru will be fine due to her strong heart. Sierra sees that Hikaru's heart hasn't yet been filled by shadows and tries to go inside it. Meanwhile, Caldina and Lafarga discuss Ascot's changes and their newfound romance. Umi wakes up in a cell on the Bravada. Selece urges her to call him if she's ever in danger before the guards come in. Over at the Dome, Windam tells the same thing to Fuu. At the NSX, Eagle Vision plans to take the castle as the Magic Knights are separated. Geo asks him if he's sure he wants to do this, recalling his friendship with Lantis, but Eagle tells him it doesn't matter anymore. He then starts coughing up blood but stops Geo from calling Zazu. He confesses to Geo that he has a fatal disease, which is why he said it doesn't matter what Lantis thinks of him. Meanwhile, the glow around Emeraude's crown dims.
| 35 | 15 | "Umi and the Ambition of Tarta and Tatra"; Transliteration: "Umi to Tāta—Tatora no Yabō" (Japanese: 海とタータ·タトラの野望) | Hitoyuki Matsui | Nanase Ohkawa | July 31, 1995 |
Eagle Vision and Geo hide Eagle's illness from Zazu and Geo orders an attack in six hours' time. In the palace, the sword ceremony continues as Sierra tries to get through to Hikaru while Nova mocks her. Meanwhile, Umi, forced into Chizetan garb, is brought into the presence of the princesses. Umi and Tarta butt heads until she challenges Umi to a duel. The two battle fiercely with Umi as the victor. She and the sisters then have tea where they explain that they're invading Cephiro to expand Chizeta's territory due to its small size. Umi tells the princesses what being the Pillar of Cephiro entails and that she'll have to fight against them if they continue their invasion. She then summons Selece and leaves the Bravada. Tarta and Tatra try to stop her with their djinn, but Umi's words have made them doubt themselves. As Umi fights Rakoon and Rasheen, she has a vision of Hikaru. Fuu has one too right before she's taken to Aska.
| 36 | 16 | "Fuu versus Aska! The Life or Death Archery Match"; Transliteration: "Fū tai Asuka! Inochigake no Yumi Shōbu" (Japanese: 風対アスカ! 命がけの弓勝負) | Yasuchika Nagaoka | Nanase Ohkawa | August 7, 1995 |
Aska questions Fuu about Cephiro and her Rune-God, demanding she hand it over. Fuu suggests they have an archery match: if Aska wins, she gets the Rune-God and if Fuu wins, she is to be returned to Cephiro. Aska accepts, despite Chang Ang's reservations. In the palace, Sierra struggles to connect with Hikaru who hears her voice. Sierra is able to reinvigorate Hikaru but she's knocked back by Nova. Lantis runs through the palace towards the evil presence, sensing that Hikaru's life force is fading. At the Bravada, Umi tries to go to Hikaru's aid but is unable to get past Rakoon and Rasheen. A monster summoned by Ascot intervenes and he joins her in fighting the djinn. Back at the Dome, Fuu and Aska prepare for their match. Aska summons miniatures of the djinn for them to shoot and Fuu wins by a landslide. However, a group of ninja appear and Aska orders them to capture her. Fuu nonlethally defeats them with her archery and magic but is soon outnumbered. She shoots the baskets full of djinn who swarm over the ninja. Fuu continues to leave but Aska demands a rematch. When Fuu refuses, Aska summons a sword, telling Fuu she won't allow her to escape.
| 37 | 17 | "Revive, Hikaru's Sword!"; Transliteration: "Yomigaere! Hikaru no Ken" (Japanese: 甦れ! 光の剣) | Hitoyuki Matsui | Nanase Ohkawa | August 14, 1995 |
Aska summons a multitude of swords and hurls them at Fuu, who easily defends herself with her magic. She holds Aska with a gust of wind and requests her belongings back. Fuu apologizes to Aska for binding her and asks why she's come to Cephiro. Aska says that becoming the Pillar will give her the power to do whatever she wishes and become as beautiful as Emeraude. Fuu explains the enormous responsibility that rests on the Pillar's shoulders, saying she won't be able to fall in love with anyone and that Cephiro will crumble if she ever doubts herself. Ferio suddenly bursts in and takes Fuu away. He fights his way through Aska's ninjas and escapes the Dome with Fuu on the back of a giant bird. Fuu's words, however, make Aska think. Ferio and Fuu share a tender moment, which is interrupted when Fuu senses Hikaru's distress. Meanwhile, Hikaru is still trapped in her mind along with Nova, who bombards her with energy beams. Nova says she loves Hikaru so much because Hikaru hates herself, much to her shock. Nova moves to kiss her when Sierra manages to communicate with Hikaru and give her courage by reminding her of all the people she's fighting for. Hikaru, having found the strength to react, recreates her sword and defeats Nova. Finally free, Hikaru returns to Cephiro and she confesses her feelings to Lantis. Umi and Fuu both sense Hikaru's return when Debonair appears in front of everyone. She says that her power comes from the despair of the inhabitants of Cephiro. Debonair attacks Umi but Ascot takes the hit for her. She then attacks Fuu and Ferio, her blast easily breaking through Fuu's barrier spell. As she prepares one massive attack, Clef tells Umi and Fuu to synchronize with his heart. They do and are teleported back to the palace. Debonair says the land will soon belong to her eternally.
| 38 | 18 | "Eagle's All-out Attack on Cephiro Castle!"; Transliteration: "Īguru—Sefīrojō Sōkōgeki" (Japanese: イーグル·セフィーロ城総攻撃!) | Hajime Kamegaki | Nanase Ohkawa | August 21, 1995 |
Hikaru thanks the bedridden Sierra for helping her not give in to herself. Sierra brings up Lantis but Hikaru doesn't remember her confession that she loves him. At the same time, Umi watches over Ascot but worries about Clef. Caldina asks if she has a thing for Clef but Umi nervously laughs it off. Fuu thanks Ferio for saving her. The NSX prepares to launch its assault on Cephiro as Mokona leads Hikaru to where Lantis is. The two talk and Lantis realizes Hikaru doesn't remember her love confession. He gives her a pendant that was given to him by his mother, saying it'll protect her. At that moment, the NSX attacks. The first blast is repelled by Clef, who protects the castle with a magical barrier. Eagle Vision, having detected a weak spot in the barrier, then launches a second attack aboard the FTO together with Geo, who pilots the robot GTO. The Magic Knights face the invaders, but Eagle, thanks to a clever strategy, defeats Umi and Fuu; leaving only Hikaru to stop him. Meanwhile, Debonair frees Alcyone from her imprisonment.
| 39 | 19 | "Chaotic War at Cephiro Castle!"; Transliteration: "Sefīrojō Daikonran" (Japanese: セフィーロ城 大混戦!) | Yukio Okazaki | Nanase Ohkawa | August 28, 1995 |
Eagle tries to penetrate the castle's magical shield, ordering Geo to keep Hikaru busy. Inside the palace, Debonair manages to manifest through Alcyone and invade the castle with monsters. Geo has Hikaru on the ropes, but Fuu returns and heals her and Umi. Hikaru tells them to handle Geo while she goes after Eagle. The two engage in battle while Lantis looks in on Alcyone while Lafarga, Caldina, and Ferio fight Debonair's monsters. Debonair, taking advantage of the chaos, heads for the hall of the crown. Outside, Eagle drives the FTO into the barrier and is able to break through. Lafarga, Ferio, Caldina and Ascot defend the people from Debonair's monsters. Eagle Vision makes it inside the castle and heads for the Pillar with Hikaru in hot pursuit. The two continue to fight as Lantis arrives at the hall of the Pillar and comes face-to-face with Debonair, who enters the hall. She tries to take the crown but it generates an intense light that repels Debonair and destroys her monsters. The light is revealed to be the spirit of Princess Emeraude.
| 40 | 20 | "The Magic Knights and the Calm After the Storm"; Transliteration: "Majikku Naito to Hitotoki no Yasuragi" (Japanese: 魔法騎士とひとときの安らぎ) | Keitaro Motonaga | Nanase Ohkawa | September 4, 1995 |
The light renders Hikaru and Eagle Vision unconscious. Hikaru has a vision of Cephiro in the past and sees when Zagato confided to Lantis his love for the princess and the desire to end the Pillar system. Lantis, faced with the unhappiness of the two lovers, realized that the planet was not as wonderful as it seemed and the desire was born in him to create a new world where no one would have to sacrifice himself as happened to Zagato and Emeraude. Hikaru wakes with Umi and Fuu watching over her. They tell Hikaru that a ceasefire is in effect because Eagle Vision has been imprisoned. Geo returns to the NSX and orders the crew to standby. Eagle Vision is visited by Lantis. At Castle Debonair, Debonair curses Princess Emeraude for weakening her power but says that Emeraude spent the last of her power and that her monsters made people even more afraid. Nova complains to Debonair about how Hikaru keeps pushing her out of her heart and Debonair advises her to go after Lantis. The Magic Knights take the opportunity to spend a few moments of peace with the palace inhabitants. Fuu sings for them and the children discuss Emeraude and the Pillar, Mira mentioning how Lantis said the world could get along without a Pillar. In the hall of the Pillar, the water swirls around the crown and it begins to glow. Eagle tells Lantis he heard Emeraude's voice and he says that it was the last thought of Emeraude leaving the Pillar. He restates to Eagle that he wants to end the Pillar system and why. Eagle says he will fulfill his mission, no matter the cost. As they talk, the crown begins to change shape, the signal that a new Pillar is arising. The tranquility of the castle is abruptly interrupted by the arrival of Nova. She and Hikaru fight and Nova taunts her about her love for Lantis. She then teleports out, intent on killing Lantis.
| 41 | 21 | "Nova's Battle and the Monster's Identity"; Transliteration: "Nova to no Tatakai to Mamono no Shōtai" (Japanese: ノヴァとの戦いと魔物の正体) | Hitoyuki Matsui | Nanase Ohkawa | September 11, 1995 |
A black sphere appears and brings more of Debonair's monsters. Umi and Fuu engage them, telling Hikaru to go after Nova. Clef senses Nova's presence, saying it feels exactly the same as Hikaru's. Nova arrives at Eagle Vision's cell, Lantis recognizing her from when he saw her leave Hikaru's body after the sword ceremony. Eagle is shocked by her resemblance to Hikaru. Nova fires on Lantis but he's protected by the barrier meant to confine Eagle. Hikaru frantically searches for Lantis when her pendant shoots a beam to show her the way. Nova manages to destroy the barrier and engages Lantis in battle. Lantis demands to know who she is and why she looks like Hikaru. Nova says she is Hikaru and was born from her, which causes Lantis to come to a realization. Hikaru continues to follow the beam as Nova and Lantis continue to fight and she manages to land a hit on him. Nova tries to land a finishing blow but Eagle stops her. Nova tells him Hikaru loves him too. She attacks him but he's saved by the arrival of Hikaru. Umi and Fuu continue to fight the monsters with aid from Ascot, Ferio, Lafarga and Caldina. Nova and Hikaru fight as the Pillar continues to change shape, which Clef senses. Fuu realizes the children's fear is creating new stronger monsters and Umi implores them not to be afraid. Lantis engages Nova again and she plants a kiss on him which shocks Hikaru and leaves her open to an attack. Nova taunts Hikaru's love, saying that Lantis will never love her back for killing Zagato. Umi and Fuu plead for the children to believe in them and the children finally choose to do so, causing the sphere and the monsters to weaken. Debonair informs Nova of this and orders her to retreat. Nova reluctantly complies but she promises that Lantis will belong to her. Umi and Fuu destroy the black sphere but Hikaru was wounded by Nova's words about Lantis rejecting her.
| 42 | 22 | "Giant Sang Yung versus the NSX!"; Transliteration: "Kyodai Sanyun tai Enuesuekkusu!" (Japanese: 巨大サンユン vs NSX!) | Keitaro Motonaga | Nanase Ohkawa | September 18, 1995 |
Umi and Fuu tell Hikaru about the children and the monsters and remind her that she can tell them about her troubles. On the NSX, Geo is agitated about not hearing from Eagle, partly because of his knowledge about Eagle's illness. Eagle detects where the proof of the Pillar is but succumbs to another coughing fit. Hikaru tells Umi and Fuu that she had dreamed about Debonair and Nova back in Tokyo. They wonder why only Hikaru had those dreams and she apologizes for not telling them earlier. They remind her that the reason they're fighting is to protect those they love. Meanwhile, Aska is thinking about what Fuu told her about the Pillar. Chang Ang alerts her about the NSX where Geo plans to rescue Eagle Vision. However, the Dome approaches them due to Aska intervening on behalf of Fuu and the Rune Gods. She tells Chang Ang she doesn't want to be the Pillar anymore as she loves the people of Fahren too much. The Magic Knights watch in amazement as the giant Sang Yung goes to fight the NSX. It batters the ship until it retreats above the clouds. Aska orders the giant to follow it, the NSX's weapons failing to harm it. Geo orders the ship to ram into the giant and then fires the Laguna cannons. This also fails to defeat the giant which carries the NSX away. Aska passes out from the strain of fighting, saying she promised to have tea with Fuu. Fuu hopes that Aska found someone she cherishes more than wanting to be the Pillar. This causes Hikaru to recall how Nova told her Lantis would never love her back while Eagle thinks about Hikaru and how Nova told him Hikaru loves him too. He then destroys the barrier imprisoning him and runs to take the proof of the Pillar.
| 43 | 23 | "The Crown Room and the Pillar's Memory"; Transliteration: "Ōkan no Heya to Hashira no Kioku" (Japanese: 王冠の部屋と柱の記憶) | Yasuchika Nagaoka | Nanase Ohkawa | October 16, 1995 |
Eagle Vision blows down the door of his cell and heads for the crown room, which Clef senses. Alcyone wakes up in a bed and mistakes an arriving Lantis for Zagato. Lantis says Lady Debonair's spell on her is broken and asks where Debonair is. Alcyone is unable to answer without suffering great pain. On the NSX, repairs begin as Fahren has withdrawn. Eagle goes to Lantis for his sword, as he needs it to access the crown room. Clef alerts the Magic Knights about Eagle Vision's escape. Meanwhile, jhe confronts Lantis in Alcyone's room and goads Lantis into pursuing him. Bombs he dropped throughout the halls detonate and the Magic Knights split up to deal with them. Lantis catches up with Eagle and the two fight. Hikaru finds them and her presence causes the gem in Lantis' sword to glow. The same happens to Clef's ring. The three find themselves teleported outside the crown room. Lantis' sword makes the door open and Eagle runs inside. Lantis tries to stop him but is held back. Hikaru tries to stop Eagle herself and both enter the crown room. The water attacks them and they have a vision of Emeraude accepting the Pillar and Clef assigning Lantis and Zagato to her. These are followed by visions of Emeraude falling in love with Zagato, Lantis' departure from Cephiro, Emeraude confessing her love for Zagato to Clef and summoning the Magic Knights. After witnessing her death at the hands of the Magic Knights, Emeraude tells Hikaru and Eagle Cephiro's fate will be determined by them. The two are sent out of the crown room and Lantis wonders which will become the Pillar.
| 44 | 24 | "A Serious Match - Umi vs. Tarta and Tatra!"; Transliteration: "Shinken Shōbu! Umi tai Tāta—Tatora" (Japanese: 真剣勝負! 海 vs タータ·タトラ) | Yorimichi Nakano | Nanase Ohkawa | October 23, 1995 |
Clef awakens to find Lantis at his door. He informs Clef that Hikaru and Eagle are both worthy of becoming the Pillar. Primera, still searching for Lantis, comes to the angry conclusion that he's with Hikaru. She and Mokona then see that the Bravada is approaching the palace. The others notice it too, concerned that Hikaru and Clef will be unable to help. Umi volunteers to go and face Tarta and Tatra. Ascot says he'll go with her, confessing his feelings for her as well. However, Umi says she loves him as much as the rest of their friends and has him stay behind to guard the castle. Umi tells Fuu to stay behind as well. Summoning Selece, she heads to the Bravada and is met by Rakoon and Rasheen. Tarta speaks through her djinn and challenges Umi to a duel: both sisters will fight Umi and if she wins, they will call off the invasion. After a brief discussion with Selece, Umi accepts. Rakoon and Rasheen fuse together and form a battlefield with Tarta first to fight. They battle intensely until Tarta falls off the edge but is saved by Umi. Tatra steps up for her turn, Tarta warning Umi that no one has ever been able to beat her. The elder sister proves to be much tougher than the younger, nearly sending Umi over the edge but Tarta has her djinn save her. Umi's will becomes strong enough to send out a blast of magic that takes down Tatra. The two honor their end of the bargain and end the invasion, much to the happiness of Umi as they no longer have to fight. At Castle Debonair, Lady Debonair senses that the proof of the Pillar is changing shape. Knowing she must act before a new Pillar is chosen, she sends Nova to the palace along with a pair of monsters, Seville and Alba.
| 45 | 25 | "Desperate Situation: Crisis Upon Lantis"; Transliteration: "Zettaizetsumei! Rantisu no Kiki" (Japanese: 絶体絶命! ランティスの危機) | Hitoyuki Matsui | Nanase Ohkawa | October 30, 1995 |
Lantis and Clef agree that the Pillar system is flawed. Hikaru and Eagle wake up, remembering what Princess Emeraude said to them. Clef asks Lantis why he left Cephiro and why he returned so soon after Emeraude's death. Lantis says he came back to end the Pillar system as Emeraude's tragedy will repeat again and again. Clef says he will tell the next Pillar what will happen to them, even if it means they'll refuse. The Bravada approaches the palace and the djinn form a bridge to where Fuu and Ferio are waiting. Umi crosses it and introduces Tatra and Tatra who announce the end of their invasion. The Dome then arrives and Aska announces that she has not come to fight. She and Sang Yung enter the palace and Aska says she's giving up on invading. Hikaru and Eagle reflect on what happened in the crown room, wondering if each other is the next Pillar. Eagle comments that if it's Hikaru, Lantis will have fallen in love with the Pillar, just like his brother. Nova suddenly attacks Hikaru but is repelled by Hikaru's pendant. Enraged, Nova summons Seville and Alba and teleports away with Alba to go after Lantis. Nova appears in Clef's room, saying she got past the barrier because she's Hikaru, much to Clef's shock. Nova lets Alba in and takes him and Lantis to her dimension. He and Alba fight but the monster is able to regenerate from damage. Clef tells Lantis that Nova is a part of Hikaru's heart and that if he tries to dispel Nova's dimension or if Lantis injures Nova, Hikaru will be injured as well. Back at the palace, Hikaru fights Seville but he is also able to regenerate from damage. Nova taunts Lantis not being able to hurt her without hurting Hikaru as well. She distracts him with a vision of Hikaru and then stabs him. Nova laughs that Lantis is hers, causing Hikaru to despair.
| 46 | 26 | "Hikaru in Shock: The Truth About Nova!"; Transliteration: "Hikaru—Shōgeki! Nova no Shinjitsu" (Japanese: 光·衝撃! ノヴァの真実) | Keitaro Motonaga | Nanase Ohkawa | November 6, 1995 |
Hikaru continues to fight Seville, who has her on the ropes. He's able to land a cut on her but Hikaru destroys him with Flame Arrow. Clef contacts her but says he doesn't know where Lantis is. She frantically tells him that Lantis is hurt and Clef tells her to calm down or Nova will become even stronger. Umi, Fuu and the others run towards the noise, the two having heard Hikaru scream. Alba appears and attacks them, regenerating from its wounds and shrugging off Umi and Fuu's spells. He dispatches their allies, which gives Umi and Fuu resolve that gives them new spells that destroy Alba. Umi and Fuu hear Hikaru scream again due to Clef saying that Nova is the shadow of her heart. Seville comes back and resumes fighting Hikaru. She reflects on how she denied what she had done to Emeraude but couldn't say it. Clef explains that created a shadow on Cephiro which is Nova, namely Hikaru's regret, sadness and frustration at herself. Hikaru realizes Nova loves her because Hikaru couldn't forgive herself for killing Emeraude. She also realizes that since Nova is her heart, she herself is the one hurting Lantis. This revelation causes her to unleash an attack that destroys Seville. Nova senses this, saying her heart hurts. Debonair says it's Hikaru's emotions flooding into her and that she plans to use Lantis' strong heart. Hikaru enters Eagle Vision's cell and apologizes for Lantis being hurt and captured. Clef, despite Sierra's protests, goes to Alcyone to learn where Debonair is. Hikaru tells Eagle about Nova and apologizes again as she knows he loves Lantis. She cries on him, saying she can't hate him despite him being an enemy and he says he feels the same. Clef and Sierra get to Alcyone as Cephiro continues to fall apart. The civilians and Primera panic while Mira and her friends hope they can be as strong as the Magic Knights. Ascot runs to find Umi but Caldina tries to stop him by telling him who she's really in love with. Ascot says it's alright as he's satisfied just loving her. Impressed, Caldina lets him go. Back with Hikaru and Eagle, he implores her not to cry but Hikaru laments that Lantis must hate her for killing Zagato but she still loves him regardless. Eagle says Emeraude probably thought the same thing. He says he wants to be friends with her and the others but can't give up on his wish to save Autozam. He's then struck by a coughing fit. Clef pleads with Alcyone to tell him where Debonair is but she doesn't care what happens to Cephiro as Zagato is dead. Hikaru asks Eagle if Lantis knows he's sick and Eagle says he doesn't want Lantis to know. He says that if he becomes the Pillar, he'll stay in Cephiro to save it but asks Hikaru to let Autozam in to examine the Pillar system. He then asks Hikaru what she plans to do if she becomes the Pillar. Meanwhile, all that's left of Cephiro is the ground around the palace.
| 47 | 27 | "The True Pillar is: Hikaru or Eagle!?"; Transliteration: "Shin no Hashira wa!? Hikaru ka, Īguru ka!?" (Japanese: 真の柱は!? 光か、イーグルか!?) | Yukio Okazaki | Nanase Ohkawa | November 13, 1995 |
As Cephiro continues to crumble, Clef senses that the crown has changed shape, wondering if the next Pillar will be Eagle Vision or Hikaru. The two come to him. Elsewhere, Ferio, Tarta, Tatra, Aska and Sang Yung head to the residential area while Umi and Fuu look for Hikaru. A section of the wall collapses and Umi is sucked outside but she is saved by Ascot. Ferio fears Cephiro's destruction has reached the castle. Clef is shocked to learn that Eagle will stay in Cephiro if he becomes the Pillar. He asks that in return Autozam be allowed to analyze the Pillar system. Clef senses Eagle's illness, saying it was his loyalty to Autozam that kept him going for so long; Eagle implies it was also love for Hikaru. Clef asks what Hikaru will do if she becomes the Pillar. She begins to answer but is interrupted by the arrival of Umi and Fuu. The residential area breaks up but Primera is protected by Mokona who is protected by Mira and her friends. Sierra pleads with Alcyone to say where Debonair is but Alcyone says she has no reason to live without Zagato. Eagle promises Hikaru that Lantis will come back and that Lantis loves her. He then boards the FTO and flies back to the NSX. Hikaru tells Umi and Fuu she is able to become the next Pillar. They tell Hikaru they don't want happened to Emeraude to happen to her. Hikaru agrees and starts to tell them what she plans to do as the Pillar but the Rune-Gods suddenly inform them of a giant portal, from which comes Nova in Regalia. The three board the Rune-Gods and Nova fires on them. Eagle reunites with Zazu and Geo but then see the four Rune-Gods fighting. Nova knocks down Hikaru but is hit by Umi and Fuu's new spells. Nova tells Hikaru she wants to kill everyone she loves because Hikaru had wondered if people could only be with their loved ones when they die. Hikaru tells Umi and Fuu what Nova is. Nova hits all three of them with lightning magic, revealing that Lantis is inside Regalia and its using his power. Upon learning this, Eagle goes out to help as the Magic Knights won't be able to fight as long as Regalia holds Lantis. Geo tries to stop him but Eagle says his time is up and tells him Clef has agreed to help Autozam. Eagle names Geo the new commander of the NSX and launches, arriving in time to protect the Magic Knights from another attack.
| 48 | 28 | "An Endless Battle!"; Transliteration: "Hateshinai Tatakai!" (Japanese: 果てしない戦い!) | Keitaro Motonaga | Nanase Ohkawa | November 20, 1995 |
Nova takes the Magic Knights and Eagle Vision to her alternate dimension. She deals heavy damage to them while they are unable to fight back for fear of hurting Lantis. Hikaru explains to Umi and Fuu that Nova was created the same way as how monsters are created. Nova explains she was raised by Debonair who told her that killing everyone would keep Hikaru from being sad. Back at the palace, Caldina, Lafarga, Tarta, Tatra, Aska and Sang Yung try to keep the citizens calm while Ferio worries about the Magic Knights. Umi and Fuu are knocked out and Hikaru pleads that she doesn't want everyone to die but Nova insists on what Debonair told her about killing everyone Hikaru loves. Eagle takes several hits for Hikaru and tells her to call out Lantis' name, saying only she will be able to get through to him. Hikaru does so as she doesn't want to lie to herself. The palace begins to collapse but Mira tells her friends not to cry. Umi and Fuu hold off Nova's attacks as Hikaru awakens Lantis. She reaches out to him but Nova knocks the Magic Knights back. Clef contacts Sierra and tells her he's going to support the palace with all his power and implores her to get Debonair's location from Alcyone. Lantis tells Eagle to attack Regalia but he refuses, thinking of Hikaru. Lantis says he'll escape when Nova weakens and Eagle attacks, extracting Lantis from Regalia. Doing this returns everyone to Cephiro. Debonair appears and destroys the FTO, killing Eagle. The Rune-Gods combine and charge at Debonair but are hindered by Nova. The combined Rune-God powers through and begins to destroy Regalia. Nova begs Debonair for help but she renounces her, launching an attack. Nova escapes from Regalia before Debonair's attack goes through it towards the Rune-God but the Magic Knights are able to stop it with Spiral Flash. Debonair departs and Zazu and Geo mourn Eagle Vision. Hikaru has Umi and Fuu return to the palace as she goes to confront Nova once and for all.
| 49 | 29 | "The Road to Victory: The Tomorrow that the Believing Heart Opens!"; Transliteration: "Shōri e no Michi! Shinjiru Kokoro ga Hiraku Ashita!" (Japanese: 勝利への道! 信じる心が開く明日!) | Hitoyuki Matsui | Nanase Ohkawa | November 27, 1995 |
Nova attacks Hikaru but they are all deflected. Hikaru embraces Nova, who says she was all alone without Hikaru until Debonair took her in. Hikaru apologizes for leaving Nova behind and takes her back into herself. In Alcyone's room, Sierra pleads to know where Debonair is, out of fear for Clef's life. Alcyone realizes that Sierra is not Presea and she confesses her true name, saying she wanted to spare the Magic Knights' feelings and to help Clef. Umi and Fuu arrive and ask where Debonair is, saying they will win. Alcyone begins to tell them but is suddenly engulfed by shadows. She manages to say that Debonair is in Cephiro's alternate realm before the shadows consume her. Umi and Fuu rejoin Hikaru and they break through the darkness to Castle Debonair. Inside, they find the ruined Regalia which Debonair fuses with. The four fight, Debonair reflecting their attacks back at them. The Rune-Gods combine and continue to fight as the palace continues to crumble. The NSX, Dome and Bravada arrive to help but Debonair easily dispatches them. She attacks the Rune-God again but the blast is deflected by Lantis' pendant. Debonair knocks them down, saying she was created by vast amount of fear created by the people of Cephiro due to losing the Pillar. Mira encourages the people to not be afraid. Ferio, Caldina, Ascot, Lafarga, Primera and Sierra back her up and successfully rouse the people. This empowers the Rune-God and the Magic Knights and the proof of the Pillar appears before them. Hikaru takes it and it becomes a flaming sword. With it, they destroy Debonair. Hikaru uses the power of the Pillar to do away with the Pillar system. The girls return to their friends and the Rune-Gods tell them their wish to return to and fight for Cephiro has been fulfilled. The Magic Knights realize they summoned themselves to Cephiro and that they must now return to Earth. Umi begins to confess to Clef but ultimately doesn't, Fuu promises Ferio she'll never forget him and Hikaru tells Lantis she loves him and he reciprocates. The Magic Knights then find themselves back on Tokyo Tower but are happy, unlike last time. A year later, the three return to Tokyo Tower and catch a glimpse of Cephiro restored to its former glory. Hikaru says she wants to go back to hear the story of the new Cephiro.
