= List of Kobato episodes =

Anime adaption of a manga

The cover of the first DVD compilation released by Madhouse.

Kobato is a 24-episode anime adaption of the manga of the same name by CLAMP. The series premiered in the autumn of 2009, directed by Mitsuyuki Masuhara and animated by Madhouse, with scripts supervised by CLAMP's Nanase Ohkawa and xxxHolic writer Michiko Yokote. The anime began its broadcast on October 6, 2009.

Hiromi Katō, the character designer of Kobato., said "Kobato. itself is kind of different from past CLAMP works, especially the way the eyes are drawn, we are trying to make it as close as we can to the original. The costumes will change in each episode."

The opening theme, "Magic Number", is performed by Maaya Sakamoto and the ending theme Jellyfish no Kokuhaku by Megumi Nakajima. A second ending theme, starting from episode 20, is "Watashi ni Dekiru Koto", performed by Megumi Nakajima.

== Episode list ==
Each episode title begins with 3 periods (...) and ends with 1 Japanese period mark (。), except for the final episode that begins with up to a total of 4 periods. For example, the second episode's title is written in Japanese as "…コンペイトウの輝き。".

| No. | Title | Directed by | Written by | Original release date |
|---|---|---|---|---|
| 1 | "…A Girl's Wish."; Transliteration: "…Negau Shōjo." (Japanese: …願う少女。) | Tomoya Takahashi | Nanase Ohkawa | October 6, 2009 |
Kobato Hanato arrives in the Human World and takes on several tests given by Ioryogi in order to prove herself worthy of the bottle. Due to her naïveté, Kobato gets herself into trouble until a stranger saves her. She has varying degrees of success with the tests, but after her singing calms a crying baby in a cherry blossom park, she receives the bottle.
| 2 | "…The Shining Konpeito."; Transliteration: "…Konpeitō no Kagayaki." (Japanese: …コンペイトウの輝き。) | Takuo Suzuki | Michiko Yokote | October 13, 2009 |
Ioryogi tells Kobato she must heal people's heart in order to fill her bottle. She runs into a man giving out tissues and helps him by taking the whole box. While passing them out, she walks into the same stranger from before. Kobato follows him to say thank you, and ends up at a daycare, Yomogi Nursery, run by Sayaka Okiura. She finds out that the stranger, Kiyokazu Fujimoto, works there, and spends the day playing with the children there. At the end of the day, she finds a boy from the nursery on a swing set. He tells her that his mother can't pick him up yet, but asks Kobato not to think badly of her because she is working hard for his sake. Kobato praises his mother, healing his heart and earning her first konpeito.
| 3 | "…A Gift from the Rain."; Transliteration: "…Ame no Okurimono." (Japanese: …雨の贈りもの。) | Yuzuru Tachikawa | Reiko Yoshida | October 20, 2009 |
Sayaka spots Kobato sleeping in a park and takes her to a friend, Chitose Mihara, who gives her a room in her apartment building. Kobato runs into a school girl, Mutsumi, outside. The next day, after failing to help anyone, Kobato gets her umbrella stolen and runs into Mutsumi again, who lets Kobato borrow her umbrella. They meet again later and Mutsumi sees her crush Katsuragi underneath with another girl. The next day, Kobato asks Katsuragi to share an umbrella with Mutsumi. Mutsumi meets him and they leave together, giving Kobato another konpeito.
| 4 | "…The Flutter of Fresh Leaves."; Transliteration: "…Aoba no Tokimeki." (Japanese: …青葉のときめき。) | Yoshitaka Makino | Mamiko Ikeda | October 27, 2009 |
Kobato meets a sad looking angel Kohaku in the streets. She sees her again the next day with the doctor (Shūichirō Kudō) Kohaku loves. After talking to Kohaku, Kobato is determined to make Kohaku and the doctor go on a date. Kobato enters a lottery to get two amusement park tickets, but ends up with a crocodile doll. She bumps into Fujimoto, who gives her his tickets for the stuffed animal. She hurries to Kohaku and gives her the tickets. Kobato is thankful but receives no konpeito because Kohaku's heart wasn't in pain. At the amusement park, another angel appears saying that Kobato only has a year before the magic bottle is taken away from her.
| 5 | "…A Firefly's Promise."; Transliteration: "…Hotaru no Yakusoku." (Japanese: …ホタルのやくそく。) | Tomohiko Itō | Yuka Yamada | November 10, 2009 |
While trying to read a firefly picture book to the children, Kobato meets the author of the book, who asks her to not read it anymore. Wondering about his strange request, she decides to find a way to cheer him up, and in the process gains another konpeito. Meanwhile, gangsters are causing trouble at the nursery, but Kobato and the children manage to make them leave.
| 6 | "…Small Hide-and-Seek."; Transliteration: "…Chiisana Kakurenbo." (Japanese: …小さなかくれんぼ。) | Kim Min-sun | Reiko Yoshida | November 17, 2009 |
The staff of Yomogi Nursery plan a field trip with the children. Before departing, Kobato receives a call from a debt collector who claims that the nursery will be shut down; Ioryogi stays behind to investigate. By the time Kobato and everyone return, Ioryogi receives a report that the nursery is in a rough financial position.
| 7 | "…A Gentle Person."; Transliteration: "…Yasashii Hito." (Japanese: …やさしいひと。) | Masahiro Hosoda | Michiko Yokote | November 24, 2009 |
Kobato finds that Fujimoto left a report at the nursery. While looking for him at the university to return it, she runs into one of his friends, Takashi Dōmoto, a young man always prone to help others and worried about Fujimoto's anti-social behavior. Kobato teaches Dōmoto how to say no and earns his konpeito.
| 8 | "…A Kitten's Lullaby."; Transliteration: "…Koneko no Komoriuta." (Japanese: …こねこの子守歌。) | Tomoya Takahashi | Mamiko Ikeda | December 1, 2009 |
Kobato finds a stray kitten and takes it home with her. However, Chitose's twin daughters, Chiho and Chise say that their mother does not allow pets in the apartment. The three look for an owner for the cat, but the two sisters begin to remember how lonely they feel. Kobato cheers them up with a song. Fujimoto listens to it as well. She earns the two sisters' konpeitos.
| 9 | "…Memories of Summer."; Transliteration: "…Natsu no Kioku." (Japanese: …夏の記憶。) | Yuzuru Tachikawa; Hisashi Abe; Morio Asaka | Miharu Hirami | December 8, 2009 |
The Nursery is on Summer break. Kobato must help two girls whose friendship is strained after one of them begins to dedicate herself almost entirely to photography. In the end, Kobato gets the girls to reconcile and earns another konpeito.
| 10 | "…The Days of the Boy and the Organ."; Transliteration: "…Orugan to Shōnen no Hi." (Japanese: …オルガンと少年の日。) | Tōru Takahashi | Yuka Yamada | December 15, 2009 |
Kobato learns more about Fujimoto's childhood through Miss Sayaka. She hopes to cure Fujimoto's heart someday.
| 11 | "…Detective Hanato Kobato."; Transliteration: "…Tantei Hanato Kobato." (Japanese: …探偵 花戸小鳩。) | Makoto Sokuza | Reiko Yoshida | December 22, 2009 |
Yomogi Nursery is having problems repaying debts, and Kobato decides to help out at Tirol Confectionery. She ends up playing detective when she and co-worker Yumi see their employer Hiroyasu in poor spirits. They discover Hiroyasu was only finding more assistance because Yumi is overworking herself for Hiroyasu's sake. Kobato earns a konpeito.
| 12 | "…Silver Eyes."; Transliteration: "…Gin'iro no Hitomi." (Japanese: …銀色の瞳。) | Takuo Suzuki | Yuka Yamada | January 5, 2010 |
Kobato and Ioryogi are in a park when an old acquaintance of Ioryogi's, Ginsei, shows up. Ginsei steals Kobato's bottle, causing a fight between him and Ioryogi.
| 13 | "…The Angel and the Protector."; Transliteration: "…Tenshi to Mamoribito." (Japanese: …天使と守り人。) | Kotono Watanabe | Michiko Yokote | January 12, 2010 |
Fall comes and Kobato and Ioryogi spot a giant Ginkgo tree. While collecting fallen leaves from the tree with the children, Kobato learns that it is to be torn down. She looks for a way to prevent it, but the tree's life is nearing its end anyway, so Kobato and Kohaku sing for it and earn the tree's konpeito.
| 14 | "…Twilight Search."; Transliteration: "…Tasogare no Sagashimono." (Japanese: …黄昏の探しもの。) | Kim Min-sun; Yūzō Satō; Tomoya Takahashi | Miharu Hirami | January 19, 2010 |
Kobato and Fujimoto take the children to pick potatoes. They see a boy stealing some. After tracking him down, they find that he ran away from his home because of his grandfather's yelling. Kobato helps the boy realize his grandfather is worried about him, earning another konpeito.
| 15 | "…Hidden Prayer."; Transliteration: "…Himetaru Inori." (Japanese: …秘めたる祈り。) | Akira Nakagawa | Mamiko Ikeda | January 26, 2010 |
Sayaka falls ill. Kobato calls in Shūichirō since he is a doctor. Kobato and Fujimoto aid her recovery.
| 16 | "…Mysterious Lifeform."; Transliteration: "…Nazo no Seimeitai." (Japanese: …謎の生命体。) | Naoyuki Itō | Reiko Yoshida | February 2, 2010 |
The timeline for the nursery to pay their debts is running out and Kobato convinces the children to hold a bazaar in order to raise funds to prevent it from being closed. Later, Kobato meets face to face with Kazuto Okiura, the debt collector, and is told that he is Sayaka's ex-husband. The next day, they find people aren't coming to the bazaar because Kazuto took down the posters. Kobato runs through town, calling out loudly that there's a bazaar at the nursery, and people finally attend.
| 17 | "…Mysterious Lifeform, Part 2."; Transliteration: "…Nazo no Seimeitai, Ni-gō." (Japanese: …謎の生命体、2号。) | Tomoya Tanaka | Tsutomu Mizushima | February 9, 2010 |
While advertising for the bazaar, Kobato finds a worn down Ioryogi who was struggling to protect his precious box of baumkuchen from harm.
| 18 | "…Warmth of the Wintry Wind."; Transliteration: "…Kogarashi no Nukumori." (Japanese: …木枯らしのぬくもり。) | Yoshitaka Makino | Yuka Yamada | February 16, 2010 |
Winter arrives and Kobato is warned by Ioryogi that she must accomplish her mission by spring. One of Kazuto's thugs hangs at the nursery's door, intimidating the children's parents. He collapses on the ground and Kobato takes him to a hospital along with Domoto. Kobato hears a confession from Domoto that she misunderstands.
| 19 | "…White Christmas."; Transliteration: "…Howaito Kurisumasu." (Japanese: …ホワイトクリスマス。) | Ryōsuke Nakamura | Reiko Yoshida | February 23, 2010 |
Christmas is approaching, but Fujimoto has been treating Kobato coldly, making her feel certain that he despises her. Chitose tells Kobato a story about Fujimoto's mother, who disappeared one Christmas night. Domoto walks home with Kobato. She breaks down and tells him about her problems with Fujimoto, saying that she can't stop thinking about him, but her heart aches when she does. Domoto decides that helping her and Fujimoto make up would be the perfect present for Kobato.
| 20 | "…The Travelers."; Transliteration: "…Tabi o Suru Hito." (Japanese: …旅をするひと。) | Kim Min-sun; Yūzō Satō; Kotono Watanabe | Nanase Ohkawa | March 2, 2010 |
With Valentine's Day coming up, Kobato wants to throw a party at the nursery, and decides to work at Tirol again to pay for it. After work, she sees a flash and hears some voices, one of them much like Ioryogi's. They turn out to be world-jumping travelers Syaoran, Fai, Kurogane and Mokona, who she lets stay in her room until they have to leave again. They work to pay her back. At Tirol, Syaoran says that he has someone waiting for him, but he does not know when he will be able to see her again (Sakura). Kobato realizes she wants to be with Fujimoto. They all have to leave after only a night, but have earned enough money that Kobato has more than enough to pay for the party.
| 21 | "…Footsteps of Spring."; Transliteration: "…Haru no Ashioto." (Japanese: …春の足音。) | Makoto Sokuza | Mamiko Ikeda | March 9, 2010 |
Kazuto shows up again, demanding payment. Kobato is worried, and decides to wait outside his office. When he comes out she asks him about his feelings for Sayaka. Kobato passes out from the cold rain, and Kazuto carries her back to the nursery, where Sayaka and Kazuto resolve the tension. Sayaka asks Kazuto to wait until the children's graduation before closing down the nursery. He agrees and Kobato receives two konpeitos. Ioryogi stares out the window at the first blossoms of spring.
| 22 | "…The Day of Farewells."; Transliteration: "…Sayonara no Hi." (Japanese: …さよならの日。) | Naomi Nakayama | Michiko Yokote | March 16, 2010 |
The Nursery is torn down, leaving Kobato in despair, but she still has to achieve her goal. She wants to help Fujimoto, but she doesn't have time. He walks away from her, thinking she was only pitying him. Her heart hurts but she doesn't know why. Ushagi-san shows up with a message from heaven, and Ioryogi gets on his hands and knees to beg for more time.
| 23 | "…Kobato's Wish."; Transliteration: "…Kobato no Negai." (Japanese: …こばとの願い。) | Morio Asaka; Tomoya Takahashi | Michiko Yokote | March 23, 2010 |
Kobato's time for her mission is up, but the bottle is not full. She says goodbye to everyone except Fujimoto. He finds her in the park. When Fujimoto hears the truth about Kobato, that she is in fact a liminal being, he wants her to stay, and a konpeito from him fills the bottle. Kobato's wish is granted but she must leave Fujimoto due to the contract.
| 24 | "The Day to Come…"; Transliteration: "Ashita Kuru Hi…" (Japanese: あした来る日…。) | Mitsuyuki Masuhara; Kotono Watanabe | Miharu Hirami | March 23, 2010 |
After Kobato leaves, everyone forgets about her. Fujimoto suddenly remembers Kobato after seeing her konpeito, and rushes around asking people if they remember Kobato. All of them don't until he asks Kohaku. She assures him about Kobato, and that they will surely meet again. That is a several year time-skip. Fujimoto becomes a lawyer. When he is asked to help with a case of inheritance, he meets Kobato at an old estate, who has forgotten her previous memories. Her memory is restored by the konpeito Fujimoto gives her and the song she sings. As Kobato and Fujimoto embrace, all the lives Kobato touched when she was gathering konpeitos are reviewed.
