= List of Tsubasa: Reservoir Chronicle original video animations =

- Tsubasa: Reservoir Chronicle
- Cover of the Western release
- Original video animation

Tokyo Revelations
- Directed by: Shunsuke Tada
- Produced by: Takuya Matsushita; Kiichirō Sugawara
- Written by: Nanase Okawa (Note: Credited under the pseudonym Ageha Ookawa (大川緋芭).)
- Music by: Yuki Kajiura
- Studio: Production I.G
- Licensed by: NA: Funimation
- Released: November 16, 2007 – March 17, 2008
- Runtime: 25 minutes
- Episodes: 3
- Original video animation

Spring Thunder Chronicles
- Directed by: Shunsuke Tada
- Produced by: Takuya Matsushita; Kiichirō Sugawara
- Written by: Nanase Okawa
- Music by: Yuki Kajiura
- Studio: Production I.G
- Licensed by: NA: Funimation
- Released: March 17, 2009 – May 15, 2009
- Runtime: 25 minutes
- Episodes: 2

The Tsubasa: Reservoir Chronicle manga by Clamp inspired two original video animation (OVA) series animated by Production I.G. They were directed by Shunsuke Tada and written by Nanase Ohkawa, with music provided by Yuki Kajiura. A three-episode OVA series titled Tsubasa Tokyo Revelations (ツバサ TOKYO REVELATIONS) was released between November 16, 2007, and March 17, 2008, across three DVDs bundled with limited versions of volumes 21, 22, and 23 of the manga. Their plot is set after the anime's ending, and follows the arrival of Syaoran's group in a postapocalyptic Tokyo, where the connection between Syaoran and a teenager identical to him is revealed.

A two-episode OVA series titled Tsubasa Spring Thunder Chronicles (ツバサ春雷記, Tsubasa Shunraiki) was released across two DVDs. The first was packaged with volume 26 of the manga, which was released on March 17, 2009; and the second was packaged with volume 27, released on May 15, 2009. They are set after the characters' journey to Seresu as they search for a way to make Sakura's soul return to her body. In May 2010, Funimation announced they licensed both series of OVAs. They were released together under the title of "Tsubasa: RESERVoir CHRoNiCLE — OVA Collection" in both DVD and Blu-ray formats on January 4, 2011. In June 2011, Funimation started streaming the five episodes on their official website.

Critical response to the OVAs has been positive for the improvement of animation and the darker storyline involving the conflict between the two identical teenagers known as Syaoran. However, the lack of sequels to Spring Thunder Chonricles was a subject of criticism as the narrative's climax is foreshadowen but never reached.

== Episode list ==
=== Tsubasa: Tokyo Revelations ===
No.	Title	Location	OVA release date
1	"The Magician's Message"; Transliteration: "Majutsushi no Dengon" (Japanese: 魔術師の伝言)	Tokyo	November 16, 2007
The group arrives in a desolated Tokyo. Running under cover from the acid rain, Syaoran and Mokona run into Kamui and his group. Sustaining bad injuries, Syaoran is rescued by Kurogane, who then fights Kamui to a draw. Deciding that the travelers are not thieves, Kamui allows the group shelter and receive treatment for Syaoran's wounds. Kurogane speaks to Fai about his past, and then later the group runs into Fūma and his group. The Syaoran being held captive by Fei Wong Reed awakens.
2	"The Boy's Right Eye"; Transliteration: "Shōnen no Migime" (Japanese: 少年の右目)	Tokyo	January 17, 2008
It is revealed that the Syaoran that has been collecting the feathers so far is a clone and that the real Syaoran was the one trapped by Fei Wang Reed. The story continues as the awakened Syaoran travels towards his clone. The seal on the "heart" in the clone's right eye is broken, and Fai tries to restore it with his magic, but fails. Without the heart anymore the clone Syaoran's instincts (reasons why he was created) kick in, making him forget his own developing heart. Fai's left eye is eaten by the clone and battle breaks out between the real Syaoran and the clone. As the real Syaoran is about to strike the Clone, Sakura begs them to stop and because of this, the Clone stabs Syaoran, obtains the feather and gives it to Sakura. The Clone then leaves through a portal opened by his creator, Fei Wong Reed, ignoring Sakura's desperate pleas for him to stay. Later, Subaru, Kamui's twin, wakes up from his coma.
3	"The Dream that the Princess Saw"; Transliteration: "Himegimi no Mita Yume" (Japanese: 姫君の視た夢)	Tokyo	March 17, 2008
After the Clone left, the water has drained from the Municipal building and Fai is dying due to the loss of his eye that the clone ate. Subaru wishes to have the water restored, while Kurogane wishes to save Fai's life. Fai is fed with vampire blood and becomes a vampire, thus saving his life, and the water is restored. The price of the water, however, is that Sakura must seek out a treasure somewhere in Tokyo. In the process of searching, Sakura is injured while battling her way out. Her left eye is injured and left arm wrenched out, mirroring the injuries Syaoran had suffered. Later, she is saved on her way back by a mysterious girl (Sakura Kinomoto) and makes it back. The people of Tokyo Tower give their feather to the people of the building in exchange for letting them all live in the building. Yūko reveals that Fei Wong Reed is behind Sakura's lost feathers and their journey across the dimensions, informing them that he needs Sakura to have the memories of many dimensions imprinted upon her body. Sakura decides to find clone Syaoran, together with the others who, for their own personal reasons, start to travel into another dimension again, leaving the last feather behind to ward the water and the building to protect the people of Tokyo.

=== Tsubasa: Spring Thunder Chronicles ===
No.	Title	Location	OVA release date
1	"The First Part"; Transliteration: "Zenpen" (Japanese: ツバサ春雷記 -前編-)	Celes and Nihon	March 17, 2009
The episode begins immediately after Kurogane has killed King Ashura, activating a curse placed upon Fai by Fei Wong Reed to trap them in Celes Country using Fai's own magic. Fai's remaining magic is insufficient to send them all to another dimension, so he tells Kurogane to leave him behind. Kurogane refuses, and cuts off his own arm in order to sacrifice the necessary magic. They arrive in Nihon Country, Kurogane's home world. Princess Tomoyo tells Kurogane that he has begun to understand the meaning of true strength. The hunter Fuuma arrives with an artificial arm for Kurogane from Yūko, paid for by Fai's remaining magic and Tomoyo's dreamseeing ability. Fellow hunter Seishirō arrives in search of the vampire twins Kamui and Subaru. Syaoran attacks Seishiro to reacquire the feather of Sakura's he was seen with in the Ōto arc. Syaoran seizes the feather and is transported into the world of dreams, where he meets Sakura, Watanuki Kimihiro, and the clone Syaoran, whom he prepares to fight.
2	"The Latter Part"; Transliteration: "Kōhen" (Japanese: ツバサ春雷記 -後編-)	Nihon and Dreams	May 15, 2009
The episode continues where the previous part left off, with the Clone Syaoran entering the Dream World. Watanuki is then transported away as the battle between the two Syaorans begins. The Clone gains the upper hand, and manages to knock the original Syaoran out. When Sakura attempts to protect him, the Clone stabs her but finds himself unable to kill her. He teleports her out of the way before taking the feather, but Syaoran awakens and stops the Clone as they reappear in Nihon. The two Syaorans attempt to take the feather and kill each other, but Sakura appears in the way and is impaled on Hien. She declares that she too is a Clone, and that the true Sakura is waiting for Syaoran, before dissolving into Sakura petals. Dr. Kyle appears and takes Sakura's soulless body to Fei Wang, and the Clone vanishes in anguish. They learn from Yuko that Fei Wang is in Clow Country, and that Watanuki, Syaoran's other self, paid for this information with his memories. The group then prepares to depart for Clow Country.

== Production ==
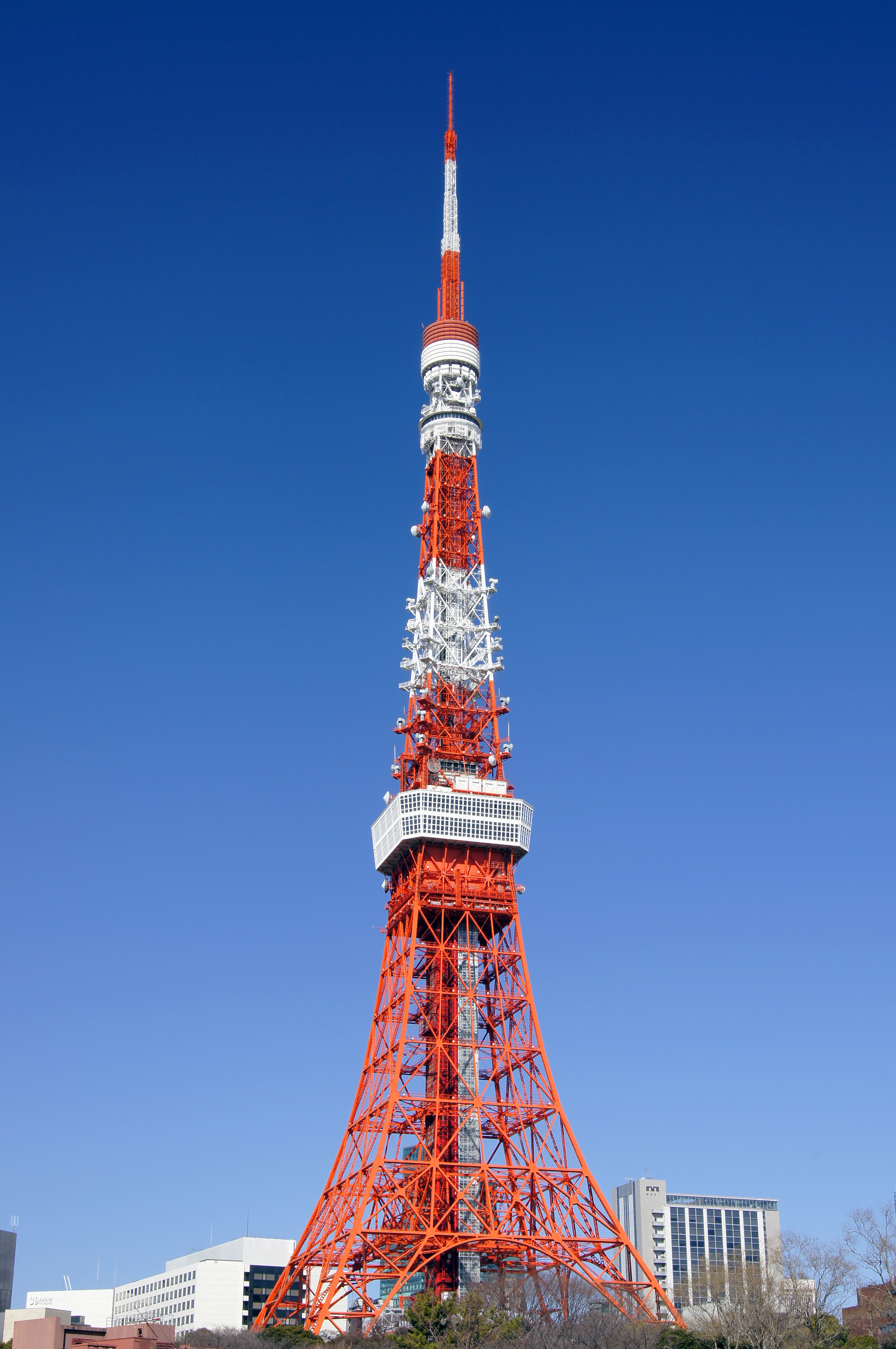
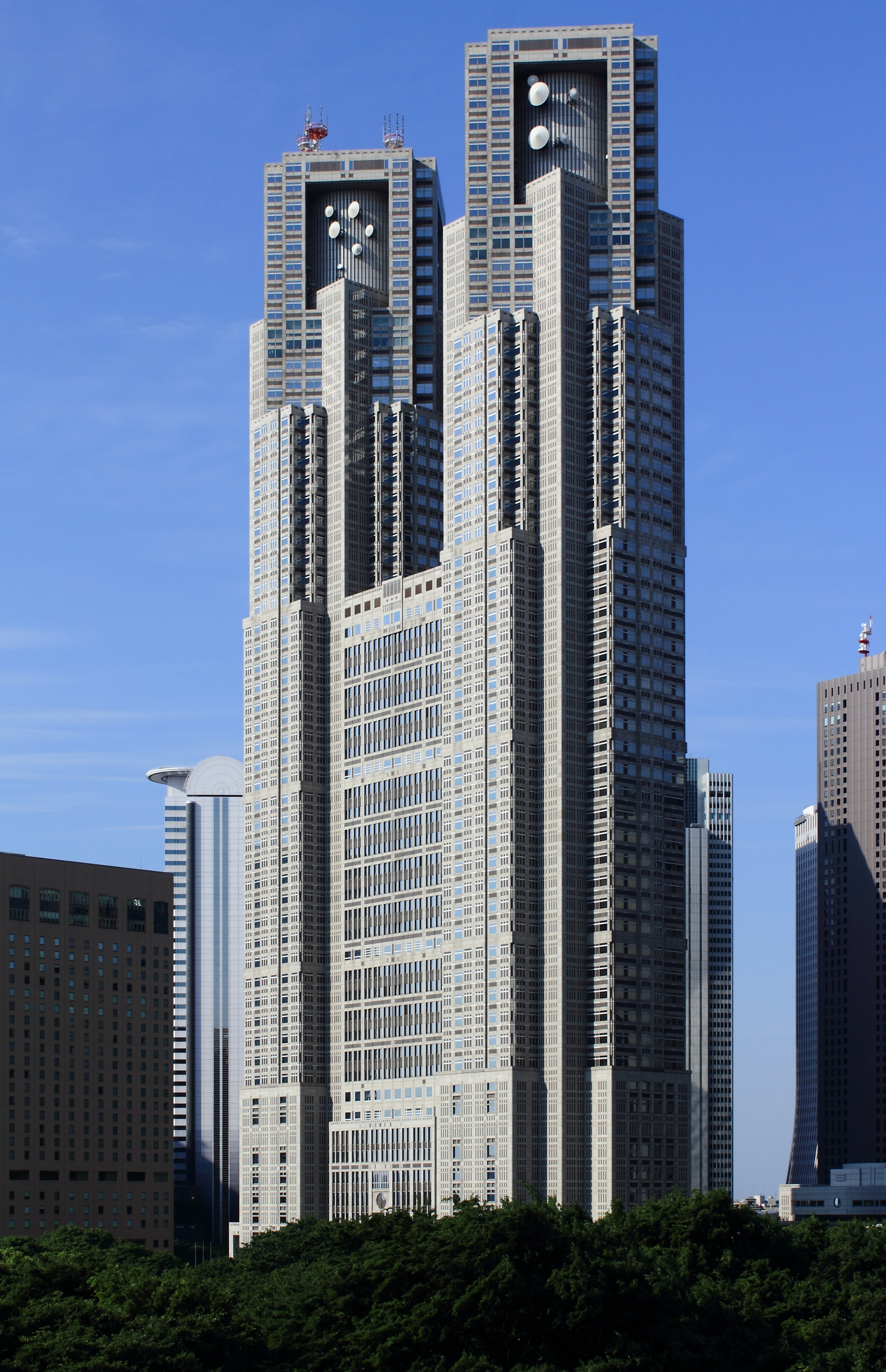
For Tokyo Revelations, Production I.G researched real parts from the city of Tokyo including the two factions' areas: The Tokyo Tower and the Metropolitan Government Building.

In contrast to the Tsubasa: Reservoir Chronicle television series which was directed by Koichi Mashimo from Bee Train, the OVAs were directed by Shunsuke Tada from Production I.G. He was assisted by Clamp writer Nanase Ohkawa. Tada felt nervous when working in the two OVAs due to how challenging was the production, especially because of how popular was the original series. He did not find this production of Tsubasa different from the television series with the exception of the fact that most viewers bought special versions of the manga to watch them.

In regards to Tokyo Revelations, Tada faced the idea of the scenarios challenging to the setting being based on the city of Tokyo which led the team to make research in order to produce a visually appealing area. However, it does not mean that it would beautiful if it is made into a video as it is, so he might talk about that part in the form of following up in the actual work. In contrast to the realism of Tokyo Revelations, Spring Thunder Chronicles took a more fantasy style due to its different worlds explored. A common element in regards to the fantasy style of Spring Thunder Chronicles is how the ancient Japan world tends to heavily focus on cherry blossom flowers.

The main cast from the television series returned with Miyu Irino now playing the two identical characters who serve as protagonist: the returning Syaoran and the new Syaoran who briefly appeared in the series. Since he has to voice the two characters, Irino found this work challenging as he need to give both Syaoran distinct personalities but was still looking forward to their fight scenes. Yui Makino plays the role of Sakura who reflected on how Sakura changed across the narrative as, in the first episode of the television series she acted cheerful and high spirited. However, after losing her soul, Sakura was calmer and gradually returned to her previous self based on the how Syaoran recovered its parts, the Feathers. Daisuke Namikawa plays Fai D. Flowright and lamented that his darker personality was not fully explored as the OVAs skipped his backstory.

Tsubasa Tokyo Revelations features two pieces of theme music. "Synchronicity" performed by Yui Makino is the opening theme. "Last Fruit" (さいごの果実, Saigo no Kajitsu) performed by Maaya Sakamoto is the ending theme. When writing "Saigo no Kajitsu", Sakamoto described Syaoran's fate as sad because he becomes the antagonist of his friends and is a clone. It was translated into English by FUNimation Entertainment. For the second series, "Sonic Boom" performed by Maaya Sakamoto is the opening theme. "Kioku no Mori" (記憶の森) performed by FictionJunction Yuuka is the ending theme.

== Reception ==
Although the Tsubasa OVAs were not the first original animation DVDs (OADs), OVAs published with manga volumes, its release helped to popularize the term. Chris Beveridge from Mania Entertainment considered the OVAs to have better quality than the TV series, mainly because they were developed by Production I.G instead of Bee Train and because they have a darker storyline. While DVDTalk found Syaoran's story similar to that of Sora from the Kingdom Hearts video games developed by the Square Enix, he felt that the narrative provided in both OVAs provided a darker tone as well as multiple plot twists that might heavily surprise the audience through the subject of cloning. Blu-ray agreed with the darker tones and twists which marked a different tone from the television series. Similarly, Anime News Network enjoyed how the narrative relied on the Syaoran clone as antagonist rather than Fei-Wang Reed but still felt the plot confusing.

In a further review, Beveridge found fascinating the events occurring in the OVAs due to the number of revelations changed the way people viewed the series. The character designs were felt to be more similar to the manga's ones than the TV series, while the animation has been considered "a notch above that of standard Television". The themes were noted to be more mature both brutally and mentally; although the number of changes presented throughout them has been praised, another series of OVAs that would conclude the storyline built in the last episode from Spring Thunder Chronicles has been requested by reviewers. DVD Talk also praised the highly detailed animation. Blu-ray in particular found the animated fight sequences appealing based on the fluid moves and the pacing executed when characters talk. Anime News Network also enjoyed the music as it reminded him of the soundtrack from Ghost in the Shell which he enjoyed as well as the serious voice acting performed through the characters of Kurogane and Mokona.
