= XxxHolic: Kei =

Second season of xxxHolic anime television series

xxxHolic: Kei
- No. of episodes: 13

Release
- Original network: TBS
- Original release: April 3 – June 26, 2008

Season chronology
- ← Previous; Season 1

The second season of xxxHolic, xxxHolic: Kei (xxxHOLiC◆継, Horikku: Kei; literally "xxxHolic: Sequel"), is an anime adaptation of a manga series written by Clamp. It was developed by Production I.G with the main staff and cast remaining the same as in the first season. The season aired on TBS on April 3, 2008, in Japan and ended on June 26, 2008, with 13 episodes in total.

The opening theme is "NOBODY KNOWS" by Shikao Suga and the ending theme is "Honey Honey" by Seamo.

== Episode list ==
| No. overall | No. in season | Title | Original release date |
|---|---|---|---|
| 25 | 1 | "Spider (Spiderweb)"; Transliteration: "Kumo no Su" (Japanese: 蜘蛛 クモノス) | April 3, 2008 |
Watanuki meets Doumeki at the temple where he lives. While helping Doumeki clean the yard, Watanuki damages a large spider web hanging from a tree. Doumeki clears the spider web away. The next day, Doumeki cannot open his right eye, which is covered in a substance similar to a spider web. Watanuki turns to Yūko, who explains that the spider, whose web Doumeki cleared away, has taken its revenge by taking something of similar value, Doumeki's eye. Watanuki feels that the spider's grudge should be directed at him, even when Yuuko points out that grudges aren't reasonable. That night, Doumeki goes outside and is engulfed by a strong wind which removes the web restoring his right eye. The next morning, Watanuki comes to school with a bandage over his right eye. When Doumeki later rips it off, it is shown that Watanuki's right eye has become blank and lost its vision which angers Doumeki. After school, Watanuki stops at the temple to deliver a book for Himawari and sees that Doumeki is carrying a large number of old books about reversing spells and lifting curses. When he tells Yuuko, she says that Doumeki is trying to lift the spider's curse himself.
| 26 | 2 | "Left Eye"; Transliteration: "Hidarime" (Japanese: 左眸 ヒダリメ) | April 10, 2008 |
Later that evening, Watanuki unexpectedly drops in on Doumeki's storeroom with food he made which he insists are simply leftovers. Doumeki is irreverent, causing Watanuki to flare up. When Doumeki tells Watanuki to go home due to the late hour and to the increased risk of encountering ghosts, Watanuki insists on staying and helping Doumeki with his research. Through an accident on Watanuki's part, Doumeki finds a hidden book written by his grandfather. Doumeki finds a spell for getting back an eye stolen by a spider, but before he can read it fully, Himawari's book comes alive. The kanji on the page form a snake-like creature, which jumps onto Doumeki's grandfather's book and starts to consume the writing. Watanuki stops Doumeki from confronting the creature, just as Yuuko suddenly appears in the storeroom. Yuuko feeds the four mystic wards protecting the storeroom to the creature which is then bound up in a ball of string. Yuuko warns Watanuki that he must get his sight back soon. On the way home from school, the Karatsu-tengu of Ame-warashi ask him to take them to Yuuko's to seek her in help in freeing Zashiki-warashi. She agrees and sends Watanuki and the pipe fox with them to free her.
| 27 | 3 | "Friend's Half (Half)"; Transliteration: "Hanbun" (Japanese: 朋分 ハンブン) | April 17, 2008 |
Watanuki with the pipe fox and the Karatsu-tengu arrive at the place where Zashiki-warashi is being held prisoner. The pipe fox changes form and breaks the barrier to the building. Watanuki and the pipe fox struggle through a miasma and eventually find Zashiki-warashi inside, bound by a spider's web. He meets a woman in a large web who has the essence of his right eye. Her name is Jurougumo, and she presides over spiders. Zashiki-warashi went to get it from her for Watanuki but was captured instead. Watanuki and the pipe fox manage to rescue Zashiki-warashi but Jurougumo swallows the essence of his right eye and escapes. Meanwhile Ame-warashi is visiting Yuuko who reassures her that Watanuki and Zashiki-warashi are OK. As Watanuki recovers at Yuuko's house, she offers him half of the essence of Doumeki's right eye. He swallows it and his right eye returns but us green instead of blue. She says everyone is connected in some way and any action has an effect on those close to them and that no-one is ever truly alone, even if they think so. The next time Watanuki sees Doumeki he gives him a large bento box, then berates him for being ungrateful. He doesn't thank Doumeki for helping to restore his vision.
| 28 | 4 | "Dream-Buying"; Transliteration: "Yumekai" (Japanese: 夢買 ユメカイ) | April 24, 2008 |
Watanuki describes a dream involving Mokona and the eggplant with Himawari, leading to a discussion of their dreams. Watanuki later experiences the dreams of Himawari and Doumeki, when he is chased by a monster and saved by Doumeki's grandfather on a horse. Yūko says that he bought the dream from Himawari because he gave her a gift. She says that he will have to sell it to a Dream Buyer. He and Yūko later sell the arrow which Domeki's grandfather had used to shoot the Dream Buyer, a creature dealing in dreams and items that come from dreams.
| 29 | 5 | "Affinity (Kohane)"; Transliteration: "Kohane" (Japanese: 由縁 コハネ) | May 1, 2008 |
While on a picnic with Himawari and Doumeki, Watanuki meets Kohane Tsuyuri, the little girl who is a famous medium and has appeared on TV. Her mother warns Watanuki to stay away from her, but the girl senses that they have something in common. Yuuko tells Watanuki that she is genuine and that they have similar abilities. The next day Doumeki tells Watanuki that he saw the girl with the eye he gave to him. Watanuki sees her again at the cherry blossom tree in the temple grounds and they both see the ghost of a woman who haunts the tree. They understand that the ghost is sustaining the old tree and keeping it alive. They decide to help and lead her to Doumeki's temple. They agree to become friends and part. Kohane goes home, but her relationship with her mother is strained as her mother is exploiting Kohane's abilities for money.
| 30 | 6 | "Peace (Konohana)"; Transliteration: "Konohana" (Japanese: 平和 コノハナ) | May 8, 2008 |
At Doumeki's place, Watanuki plays mahjong with Yūko, Mokona, and Doumeki. Watanuki loses badly because he doesn't know how to play. Ame-warashi and Zashiki-warashi arrive and try to help Watanuki, but he still loses. As the game comes to an end, the spirit of the woman who haunted the cherry tree smiles and departs. Yūko tells Doumeki that for some people, the sound of clacking mahjong is said to bring good fortune.
| 31 | 7 | "Water Cat (Water-Drawing)"; Transliteration: "Mizukumi" (Japanese: 水猫 ミズクミ) | May 15, 2008 |
The Neko-Musume (cat-girl) asks Yūko to lend her Watanuki for a job: Watanuki is to draw water from a well in exchange for an egg. To access the well, Watanuki is forced to trespass into a private garden of a house and notices a woman sitting motionless at a high window. When he returns for more water with Doumeki, the woman's position is unchanged. Watanuki establishes that the woman is not a spirit, because Doumeki can see her with his normal eye. Later, Watanuki 'pinky-promises' Himawari that he won't overwork himself. When he next collects water, his little finger hurts and the wrapper of his water container is blown into the window of the woman in the house. Doumeki and Watanuki enter the empty and silent house. Doumeki and Watanuki find the woman, who falls inert to the floor in a gust of wind. Watanuki assumes she's a doll. Yūko appears and asks Doumeki who says that it is a corpse. Watanuki protests that a corpse would have putrefied in the summer heat, but Doumeki points out that, according to his grandfather, corpses of the modern age do not rot because of the preservatives people consume. Meanwhile the Neko-Musume retrieves a dead kitten from the almost-emptied well. As she leaves, she comments on the miasma around Watanuki's little finger. This indicates that something is strange about Himawari.
| 32 | 8 | "Ring (Whisper)"; Transliteration: "Sasayaki" (Japanese: 鈴音 ササヤキ) | May 22, 2008 |
A girl claiming her house is filled with scary and strange noises seeks Yūko's aid to remove her fear of the house. Yūko gives her a bell to ring, but it makes the noises worse. Two bells have a similar effect. Yūko gives her more and more bells, but the girl says they don't work. Watanuki is concerned but Yūko says the problem will end that night. Later, in a dream, Watanuki is visited by Doumeki's grandfather, Haruka, and together they go to the girl's house. There they observe both a young couple and the girl who cannot see each other, but hear the noise of each other's presence. Watanuki realises that the girl is a ghost. He then hears that she will be exorcised by Kohane Tsuyuri, and be forced to leave the house. This will fulfil her wish as Yūko predicted, but not in the way he originally expected.
| 33 | 9 | "Rumor"; Transliteration: "Fūhyō" (Japanese: 流噂 フウヒョウ) | May 29, 2008 |
After learning that Kohane is being harassed by the public as many believe her powers are a fraud, Watanuki and Doumeki pay a visit to her with a basket of food. The house has been covered with graffiti. Kohane appears, but is injured from a fall at the TV station where she was pushed down stairs. While eating, Kohane's mother arrives home, in an angry mood and throws hot tea at Watanuki, burning him. Kohane's mother forces her to go on another TV show with other spiritual seers. All the other seers see the same vision of the ghost of a soldier in a haunted house, but Kohane see a woman too. The other seers reject her vision, and she is criticised by the public.
| 34 | 10 | "No Return (Awareness)"; Transliteration: "Kizuki" (Japanese: 不戻 キヅキ) | June 5, 2008 |
Tired of seeing Kohane being harassed by the media and mistreated by her own mother, Watanuki takes her to the shop. She spends a day with them but returns home the next day. Kohane releases the female spirit from the haunted house, and human remains are found, confirming her vision. She becomes respected again by the fickle media and public, however her mother announces Kohane's retirement and they leave their house. Some time later Watanuki sees Kohane at the tree where they first met, and she reassures him the she is well, and her mother is no longer cross with her.
| 35 | 11 | "Secret (Alone)"; Transliteration: "Hitori" (Japanese: 秘事 ヒトリ) | June 12, 2008 |
Watanuki's little finger continues to hurt and he becomes more suspicious of Himawari. In the following day, he drops and breaks a cup because of his finger. Yūko says that Himawari may not be his lady luck. That night he meets Doumeki's grandfather, Haruka in a dream and discusses the situation with him. Haruka says to stay with Doumeki. The next day Himawari taps him on the back and he accidentally falls out of the window at school when a window gives way. While unconscious, he starts to follow his dead parents, but Haruka pulls him back. A messenger from Yūko takes him to the shop where he eventually regains consciousness. Himawari is there and, before he finishes asking her about the accidents, she reveals that she already knows about them.
| 36 | 12 | "Truth"; Transliteration: "Hontō" (Japanese: 真実 ホントウ) | June 19, 2008 |
Himawari reveals to Watanuki that even though she is human, accidents can happen to anyone around her except her parents. She realises that she should never see Watanuki again, but he resists a farewell. They agree to see each other soon. Yūko tells him that the price to remove bad luck from Himawari is too high to pay. She reveals that Doumeki and Himawari paid the price for saving his life and because of their wishes, they have become her clients. Yūko will not tell him the price they paid – Doumeki gave his blood and Himawari took his scars. Yūko gives Watanuki the egg given to her by Neko-Musume from which hatches a little yellow bird. Yūko says that if he gives it to Himawari, that no harm will befall it and she can finally have a close friend without fear of bad luck affecting them.
| 37 | 13 | "Repayment"; Transliteration: "O-kaeshi" (Japanese: 報恩 オカエシ) | June 26, 2008 |
The little fox wanted to thank Watanuki so he offered him fox oden. While on a shopping trip with Yūko, Watanuki meets a small creature, Thunder Beast Raiju who controls lightning. Raiju fixes their broken refrigerator and other appliances in return for bring rescued from an electronics shop. Raiju and the gang take a trip to visit the Fox oden shop owner and Watanuki takes a gift for the little fox. Neko-Musume, Ame-warashi and Zashiki-warashi also arrive for the feast which continues into the night.
