= XxxHolic season 1 =

2008 season of xxxHolic television series

XxxHolic
- Season 1
- No. of episodes: 24

Release
- Original network: TBS
- Original release: April 6 – September 28, 2006

Season chronology
- Next → xxxHolic: Kei

xxxHolic is an anime adaptation of a manga series written by Clamp. It was developed by Production I.G and directed by Tsutomu Mizushima. The season aired on Tokyo Broadcasting System on April 6, 2006, in Japan and ended on September 28, 2006, with 24 episodes in total. The first season was licensed by Funimation Entertainment in July 2007.

This season uses three pieces of theme music: one opening theme and two ending themes. "19sai" (19才)" by Shikao Suga is used as the opening theme. The ending themes are "Reason" by Fonogenico for the first thirteen episodes and "Kagerou" (蜉蝣, Kagerō) by Buck-Tick for the following ones.

== Episode list ==
No.	Title	Original release date
1	"The Inevitable"; Transliteration: "Hitsuzen" (Japanese: ヒツゼン)	April 6, 2006
2	"Falsehood"; Transliteration: "Kyogen" (Japanese: キョゲン)	April 13, 2006
3	"Angel"; Transliteration: "Enzeru" (Japanese: エンゼル)	April 20, 2006
4	"Fortune Telling"; Transliteration: "Uranai" (Japanese: ウラナイ)	April 27, 2006
5	"Game of Letters"; Transliteration: "Shiritori" (Japanese: シリトリ)	May 4, 2006
6	"Indulgence"; Transliteration: "Tandeki" (Japanese: タンデキ)	May 11, 2006
7	"Hydrangea"; Transliteration: "Ajisai" (Japanese: アジサイ)	May 18, 2006
8	"Contract"; Transliteration: "Keiyaku" (Japanese: ケイヤク)	May 25, 2006
9	"Pinky Promise"; Transliteration: "Yubikiri" (Japanese: ユビキリ)	June 1, 2006
10	"Lamplight"; Transliteration: "Tomoshibi" (Japanese: トモシビ)	June 8, 2006
11	"Confession"; Transliteration: "Kokuhaku" (Japanese: コクハク)	June 15, 2006
12	"Summer Shade"; Transliteration: "Natsukage" (Japanese: ナツカゲ)	June 22, 2006
13	"Transfiguration"; Transliteration: "Henbō" (Japanese: ヘンボウ)	June 29, 2006
14	"Seal"; Transliteration: "Fūin" (Japanese: フウイン)	July 6, 2006
15	"Release"; Transliteration: "Kaihō" (Japanese: カイホウ)	July 13, 2006
16	"Reunion"; Transliteration: "Saikai" (Japanese: サイカイ)	July 20, 2006
17	"Self-Mutilation"; Transliteration: "Jishō" (Japanese: ジショウ)	July 27, 2006
18	"Ground Cherry"; Transliteration: "Hōzuki" (Japanese: ホオズキ)	August 3, 2006
19	"Unreasonable"; Transliteration: "Rifujin" (Japanese: リフジン)	August 10, 2006
20	"Atonement"; Transliteration: "Aganai" (Japanese: アガナイ)	August 31, 2006
21	"Nail Clipper"; Transliteration: "Tsumekiri" (Japanese: ツメキリ)	September 7, 2006
22	"Temptation"; Transliteration: "Yūwaku" (Japanese: ユウワク)	September 14, 2006
23	"Choices"; Transliteration: "Sentaku" (Japanese: センタク)	September 21, 2006
24	"Reminiscence"; Transliteration: "Tsuioku" (Japanese: ツイオク)	September 28, 2006
