= Asuka (magazine) =

Japanese manga magazine

- Cover of the magazine's July 2008 issue
- Categories: Shōjo manga
- Frequency: Monthly (1985–2021); Bimonthly (2021–present)
- Circulation: 70,000; (Oct 2018 – Sept 2019)
- Founded: 1985
- Company: Kadokawa Shoten
- Country: Japan
- Based in: Tokyo
- Language: Japanese
- Website: asuka-web.jp

Asuka (Japanese: あすか), formerly Monthly Asuka (月刊あすか, Gekkan Asuka), is a bimonthly Japanese shōjo manga magazine published by Kadokawa Shoten which targets women in their 20s and older. The magazine was established in 1985. It is released on the 24th of every odd-numbered month as of May 2021. Much like its sibling publication Shōnen Ace, it places some emphasis on anime tie-ins and spinoffs. The magazine also emphasizes human drama featuring characters who are captivating not only in their romantic relationships, but also in their dedication to their work, hobbies, and other pursuits, and generally works that women can enjoy, relate to, and be inspired by. Manga serialized in Asuka are published in tankōbon format under the Asuka Comics imprint.

== Notable manga artists and series featured in Asuka ==
- Samamiya Akaza
  - Bloody Mary
  - Ballad x Opera
  - Mr. Mallow Blue
- Tamayo Akiyama
  - Hyper Rune
  - Mouryou Kiden
  - Secret Chaser
- Sumiko Amakawa
  - Cross
- Clamp
  - Clamp School Detectives
  - Legal Drug
  - Shirahime-Syo: Snow Goddess Tales
  - Suki: A Like Story
  - Wish
  - X
- Fumino Hayashi
  - Neon Genesis Evangelion: Angelic Days (spinoff of Neon Genesis Evangelion)
- Akira Hiyoshimaru
  - Book Girl and the Delicious Recipe
  - Book Girl and the Lovesick Poet
- Haruko Iida
  - Crescent Moon
- Kasane Katsumoto
  - Hands Off!
- Ayumi Kawahara
  - Idol Densetsu Eriko
- Yōko Kondō
  - Suikyō Kitan (1988–1990)
- Temari Matsumoto
  - Kyo Kara MA no Tsuku Jiyuugyou! (based on the Kyo Kara Maoh! series)
- Min Min
  - Neon Genesis Evangelion: Gakuen Datenroku (spinoff of Neon Genesis Evangelion)
- Ai Morinaga
  - Yamada Tarō Monogatari
- Nakano
  - The Case Files of Biblia Bookstore
- Majiko!, Gorō Taniguchi, and Ichirō Ōkouchi
  - Code Geass: Lelouch of the Rebellion (spinoff of the anime series Code Geass)
- Aya Shouoto
  - Kiss of Rose Princess
  - The Demon Prince of Momochi House
- Yukiru Sugisaki
  - D.N.Angel
  - Lagoon Engine
  - Lagoon Engine Einsatz
- Satosumi Takaguchi
  - Hana no Asuka-gumi!
  - Sakende Yaruze
- Kazusa Takashima
  - Harlem Beat wa Yoake Made
- Keiko Takemiya
  - Tenma no Ketsuzoku
- Yōko Tamotsu
  - Midnight Occult Civil Servants
- Okamura Tensai and Nokiya
  - Darker than Black: Kuro no Keiyakusha (based on the anime Darker than Black)
- Setsuri Tsuzuki
  - Broken Angels
- Cain Yuga
  - Cowboy Bebop Shooting Star (based on the anime Cowboy Bebop, created by Hajime Yatate)
- Yutaka Nanten and Hajime Yatate
  - Cowboy Bebop (spinoff/adaptation of the anime series of the same name)
- Kiyo Kujo and Sunao Yoshida
  - Trinity Blood
- Kairi Yura
  - Angelique
  - Saiunkoku Monogatari
- Odagiri Hotaru
  - The Betrayal Knows My Name
- Suzuka Oda
  - Psychic Detective Yakumo

== Related magazines ==
- Monthly Asuka Fantasy DX
- Mystery DX
- The Horror
