= Kureha =

Kureha may refer to:

== People ==
- Kureha Otsuki (大築 紅葉; born 1983), Japanese politician and reporter

== Fictional characters ==
- Kureha Akabane, in Night Wizard!
- Kureha Fujishima, in After School Nightmare
- Kureha Koushou, Baki the Grappler
- Aya Kureha, in The Betrayal Knows My Name
- Ikushima Kureha, Broken Angels (manga)
- Touka Kureha, in Shining Tears X Wind, Shining Wind and Shining Blade
- Kureha Suminoya, in Sound of the Sky
- Kureha Suzuka, in Tokko (manga)
- Kureha Tsuwabuki, in Kaze no Stigma
- Dr. Kureha, in One Piece
- Kureha, in Sword Art Online: Fatal Bullet
- Kureha, in Sound Voltex

== Places ==
- Kureha Chemical Industries, a Japanese chemical manufacturer
- Kureha Station, a railway station in Toyama, Japan

== Other uses ==
- "Kureha", a single by Onmyo-Za
