= Taiki =

Taiki may refer to:

== People ==
- Taiki Kato (加藤 大樹; born 1993), Japanese footballer
- Taiki Morii (森井 大輝; born 1980), Japanese Paralympic alpine skier
- Taiki Sato (佐藤 大樹; born 1995), Japanese dancer and actor
- Taiki Tojo (東條 大樹; born 1991), Japanese baseball player
- Taiki Yamada (山田 大樹; born 2002), Japanese footballer
- Taiki (Ryukyu) (泰期), a diplomat of Chūzan Kingdom

== Places ==
- Taiki, Hokkaidō, a town in Hokkaidō, Japan
- Taiki, Mie, a town in Mie Prefecture, Japan

== Others ==
- Taiki Kou, the Sailor Moon character.
- Taiki Kudou (Mikey Kudo in English dub), the main character in Digimon Xros Wars
- Taiki Asakura, a character in the manga Mad Love Chase by Kazusa Takashima
- Mazda Taiki, a concept car
- Taiki Shuttle, a Japanese Thoroughbred racehorse.
