= Broken Angels =

Broken Angels may refer to:

- Broken Angels (novel), a 2003 science fiction novel by Richard K. Morgan
- Broken Angels (manga), a 1999 five-volume manga series by Setsuri Tsuzuki
- "Broken Angels" (Altered Carbon), a 2020 television episode
- Broken Angels, a poetry collection, including a title poem, by Susanna Roxman

== See also ==
- Broken Angel (disambiguation)
