= Kotono Mitsuishi discography =

- Studio albums: 7
- Singles: 4
- Soundtrack performances: 45
- Drama Cassette/CD performances: 131+

Kotono Mitsuishi is a Japanese voice-actress and former singer. She has released 7 studio albums and 4 singles throughout her singing career, and she has also appeared in over 45 Anime soundtracks and over 131 Drama CDs.

She has performed in several seiyuu groups including Peach Hips (from the TV series Sailor Moon), Humming Bird (from the OVA series Idol Defense Force Hummingbird), and Angels (from the radio drama and OVA series Voogie's Angel).

== Studio albums ==
Release date	Title	Album information
March 25, 1993	Mo' Merry	Label: Geneon Universal Entertainment; Catalog No.: PICA-1010; Format: CD
January 26, 1994	A・Ha・Ha	Label: Geneon Universal Entertainment; Catalog No.: PICA-1027; Format: CD
July 9, 1994	Cotton Colour	Label: Geneon Universal Entertainment; Catalog No.: PICA-1036; Format: CD
March 22, 1995	Birthday of the Sun	Label: Geneon Universal Entertainment; Catalog No.: PICA-1061; Format: CD
December 8, 1995	Koto-cha wan no Itsumoissho Kenmei - Kotochawanderland (琴ちゃわんのいつも一生懸命 Kotochawanderland)	Label: Geneon Universal Entertainment; Catalog No.: PICA-1079; Format: CD
March 22, 1996	Yasashi Otona ni Naru Tame ni (優しい大人になるために)	Label: Geneon Universal Entertainment; Catalog No.: PICA-1094; Format: CD
September 30, 1998	Niku to Kokoro (肉と心)	Label: Youmex; Catalog No.: TYCY-5608/9; Format: CD

== Singles ==
Release date	Title	Album information
November 25, 1994	Dare Yori Kagayaite (誰より輝いて)	Label: Pioneer LDC; Catalog No.: PIDA-1014/PCDA-1014
November 22, 1995	Anata ni Naritai (あなたになりたい)	Label: Pioneer LDC; Catalog No.: PIDA-1023
January 24, 1996	Akirekaeru Hodo / Itai me ni Aitai (あきれかえるほど／痛い目にあいたい)	Label: Pioneer LDC; Catalog No.: PIDA-1025
March 17, 1999	Shimasho / Sato Kashi Seikatsu? OH! Puchieregansu? (しましょ／砂糖菓子生活~OHプチエレガンス~)	Label: MMV; Catalog No.: MJDA-90005

== Other recordings ==
=== Soundtracks ===
Year	Title	Label	Catalog number	Role
1992; 1992	Babel II Original Soundtrack	SOHBI	SHCU-1011 (I); SHCU-1014 (II)	Juju
1992	Pretty Soldier Sailor Moon: ~Ai wa Doko ni Aru no?~	Nippon Columbia	COCC-10059	Usagi Tsukino/Sailor Moon
1992	Genji Tsuushin Agedama Mexican Rock A GO! GO!	Starchild Records	KICA-121	Ibuki Heike
1992	Lilia -from Ys-	Starchild Records	KICA-13	Lilia
1993	Pretty Soldier Sailor Moon R ~Toward the Future~	Nippon Columbia	COCC-10838	Usagi Tsukino/Sailor Moon
1993	Pretty Soldier Sailor Moon R: The Movie Music Collection	Forte Music Entertainment	FMCC-5019	Usagi Tsukino/Sailor Moon
1994	Ai wa Energy / Sailor Moon	Nippon Columbia	CODC-378	Usagi Tsukino/Sailor Moon
1994	Pretty Soldier Sailor Moon R: ~Maiden's Poem~	Forte Music Entertainment	FMCC-5026	Usagi Tsukino/Sailor Moon
1994	PC-Engine Edition - Pretty Soldier Sailor Moon Theme Songs	Forte Music Entertainment	FMDC-510	Usagi Tsukino/Sailor Moon
1994	Tanjo: Debut	NEC Avenue	NACL-1161	Mikan Narusawa
1994	Tuxedo Mirage / Ai no Senshi	Nippon Columbia	CODC-395	Usagi Tsukino/Sailor Moon
1994	Pretty Soldier Sailor Moon S: BIG BOX	Forte Music Entertainment	FMZX-1	Usagi Tsukino/Sailor Moon
1995	Pretty Soldier Sailor Moon SuperS: Theme Song Collection	Nippon Columbia	COCC-12809	Usagi Tsukino/Sailor Moon
1995	Pretty Soldier Sailor Moon Supers: / Christmas For You	Nippon Columbia	COCC-13058	Usagi Tsukino/Sailor Moon
1996	Pretty Soldier Sailor Moon: Music Collection Extra Version	Nippon Columbia	COCC-13402	Usagi Tsukino/Sailor Moon
1996	Pretty Soldier Sailor Moon Sailor Stars: Best Song Collection	Nippon Columbia	COCC-13720	Usagi Tsukino/Sailor Moon
1996	Pretty Soldier Sailor Moon Sailor Stars: / Merry Christmas!	Nippon Columbia	COCC-13827	Usagi Tsukino/Sailor Moon
1996	Sailor Moon Christmas	Nippon Columbia	CODC-1059	Usagi Tsukino/Sailor Moon
1996	Ai wo Shinjiteru / Eternal Sailormoon (Usagi Tsukino)	Nippon Columbia	CODC-1082	Usagi Tsukino/Sailor Moon
1997	McCow's SPECIAL	NEC Avenue	NACL-1271	Mikan Narusawa
1997	Those Who Hunt Elves Character's Songbook	Ayers (Bandai Music Entertainment)	AYCM-567	Celcia Marieclaire
1997	Pretty Soldier Sailor Moon: Series Memorial Song Box	Nippon Columbia	COCC-14459~64	Usagi Tsukino/Sailor Moon
1997	Evangelion Symphony	Starchild Records	KICA-390/1	Misato Katsuragi
1998	Pretty Soldier Sailor Moon: Series Memorial Music Box	Nippon Columbia	COCC-14785-94	Usagi Tsukino/Sailor Moon
1998	The Legends of DEVILMAN	First Smile Entertainment	FSCA-10054	Makimura Miki
1999	Sailor Moon: The Original Songs	Edel Records	0058462ERE	Usagi Tsukino/Sailor Moon
2000	Little Princess: Puppet Princess of Marl's Kingdom 2 Original Soundtrack	Futureland	TYCY-10031	Sonia Francis Zeolight
2000	Pretty Soldier Sailor Moon: Super Best	Nippon Columbia	COCX-30947	Usagi Tsukino/Sailor Moon
2001	GEAR Fighter Dendoh BEST DRIVE! ~SONG FILE	Victor Music Industries	VICL-60729	Vega
2002	Nagai Go Hero Densetsu Onkyo Geki Devilman Armageddon Hen	First Smile Entertainment	FSCA-10209	Makimura Miki
2003	Refrain of Evangelion	Starchild Records	KICA-608	Misato Katsuragi
2004	The Legends of DEVILMAN +3	Be!Smile Entertainment	BSCH-30011	Makimura Miki
2005	Neon Genesis Evangelion: Decade	Starchild Records	KICA-718	Misato Katsuragi
2008	Evangelion: 1.0 You Are (Not) Alone Original Soundtrack	Starchild	KICA 886	Misato Katsuragi
2011	Suite Precure♪ Vocal Album 1 ~Todoke! Ai to Kibou no Symphony~	Marvelous AQL	MJSA-01008	Hummy
2011	Suite Precure♪ Vocal Album 2 ~Kokoro wo Hitotsu ni~	Marvelous AQL	MJSA-01033	Hummy
2012	Suite Precure♪ Vocal Best	Marvelous AQL	MJSA-01041	Hummy
2015	One Piece Nippon Juudan! 47 Cruise CD in Kyoto - Hannari Fall in Love	Avex Pictures	EYCA-10238	Boa Hancock
2015	Sailor Moon Crystal: Character Music Collection: Crystal Collection	Evil Line Records	KICA-3239	Usagi Tsukino/Sailor Moon
2016	Magical Halloween5 - Original Soundtrack	Konami Digital Entertainment	GFCA-419/20	Soma Rosso
2017	One Piece Island Song Collection: Hurricane My Love	Avex Pictures	EYCA-11572	Boa Hancock
2017	Pretty Guardian Sailor Moon: 25th Anniversary Classic Concert Album 2017	Evil Line Records	KICA-3269/70	Usagi Tsukino/Sailor Moon
2018	Pretty Guardian Sailor Moon: the 25th Anniversary Memorial Tribute	Evil Line Records	KICA-3271	Usagi Tsukino/Sailor Moon
2018	Pretty Guardian Sailor Moon: Classic Concert Album 2018	Evil Line Records	KICA-3276	Usagi Tsukino/Sailor Moon

=== Cassette Books/Drama Cassettes ===
Year	Title	Label	ISBN	Role	Notes
1991	New Dream Hunter Rem: Yume no Kishitachi VOICE MOVIE	Meldac	METH-28004	Doll	
1991	Anata ni Aumade Cassette Book	Shueisha	SC-039	Kazuko Sasaki	Shueisha Cassette Comic Series
1991	Video Girl Ai Cassette Book	Shueisha	SC-043	Moemi Hayakawa	Shueisha Cassette Comic Series
1992	Pretty Soldier Sailor Moon 1	Movic	4-89601-042-6	Usagi Tsukino/Sailor Moon	Animate Cassette Collection 22
1992	Pretty Soldier Sailor Moon 2	Movic	4-89601-047-7	Usagi Tsukino/Sailor Moon	Animate Cassette Collection 23
1993	Future GPX Cyber Formula ROUND 1: Cyber Date Strategy	Movic	4-89601-054-X	Asuka Sugo	Animate Cassette Collection 24
1993	Pretty Soldier Sailor Moon 3: Prelude of Romance	Movic	4-89601-066-3	Usagi Tsukino/Sailor Moon	Animate Cassette Collection 25
1993	Future GPX Cyber Formula ROUND 2: Love and Sadness's Birthday	Movic	4-89601-055-8	Asuka Sugo	Animate Cassette Collection 27
1993	Pretty Soldier Sailor Moon R	Movic	4-89601-075-2	Usagi Tsukino/Sailor Moon	Animate Cassette Collection 29
1993	Future GPX Cyber Formula ROUND 3: You and Cyber Formula Night	Movic	4-89601-106-6	Asuka Sugo	Animate Cassette Collection 32
1993	Future GPX Cyber Formula ROUND 4: It's a couple race! Great tactics!!	Movic	4-89601-107-4	Asuka Sugo	Animate Cassette Collection 33
1994	Idol Defense Force Hummingbird 1 - Close contact 24 hours!! All of Hummingbird!!	Movic	4-89601-115-5	Satsuki Toreishi	Animate Cassette Collection 34
1993	Future GPX Cyber Formula ROUND 5: Magical Girl Miracle Asuka	Movic	4-89601-130-9	Asuka Sugo	Animate Cassette Collection 36
1994	Idol Defense Force Hummingbird 2 - Fluttering Hummingbird to the world!!	Movic	4-89601-136-8	Satsuki Toreishi	Animate Cassette Collection 37
1995	Idol Defense Force Hummingbird 3 - Extreme! Fight! Hummingbird	Movic	4-89601-159-7	Satsuki Toreishi	Animate Cassette Collection 43
1995	Puyo Puyo SPECIAL	Movic	4-89601-163-5	Arle Nadja	Cyber Cassette Collection 3
1995	Idol Defense Force Hummingbird 4 - Sazanami of Love	Movic	4-89601-192-9	Satsuki Toreishi	Animate Cassette Collection 46
1996	Pretty Soldier Sailor Moon R2	Movic		Usagi Tsukino/Sailor Moon	Animate Cassette Collection 50
1996	Pretty Soldier Sailor Moon S	Movic	4-89601-257-7	Usagi Tsukino/Sailor Moon	Animate Cassette Collection 54
1997	La Fillette Revolutionnaire Utena	Movic	4-89601-326-3	Juri Arisugawa	Animate Voice Cassette 10

=== Drama CDs ===
Year	Title	Label	Catalog number	Role
1991	New Dream Hunter Rem: Yume no Kishitachi VOICE MOVIE	Meldac	MECH-30004	Doll
1991	Anata ni Aumade CD Book	Shueisha	SCD-040	Kazuko Sasaki
1991	Video Girl Ai CD Book	Shueisha	SCD-044	Moemi Hayakawa
1991	YAIBA	Futureland	TYCY-5187	Sayaka Mine
1992	Genji Tsuushin Agedama Fight OH!	Starchild Records	KICA-83	Ibuki Heike
1992	Future GPX Cyber Formula Vocal Collection I	Picture Land (Polystar)	PSCX-1038	Asuka Sugo
1992	Future GPX Cyber Formula Vocal Collection II with the Dynamite band	Picture Land (Polystar)	PSCX-1050	Asuka Sugo
1992	Pretty Soldier Sailor Moon ~In Another Dream~	Nippon Columbia	COCC-10509	Usagi Tsukino/Sailor Moon
1993	Makeruna! Makendou / BELIEVE ME	DATAM Polystar	DI-1	Mai Tsurugino
1993	Shin Meikai Dragon Half	Victor Music Industries	VICL-378	Mink
1993	Namco Game Sound Express VOL.9 Knuckle Heads	Victor Music Industries	VICL-15019	Claudia Silva
1993	Magical Warlord Feng Shui 2: Horror World	Kadokawa Shoten	KC-084	Lago
1993	NG Knight Ramune & 40 DX Wakuwaku Jikuu Honoo no Kaizokuban	Starchild Records	KIDA-57 (1); KIDA-58 (2); KIDA-59 (3)	Mountain Dew Silver
1993	Kenyuu Densetsu Yaiba	Futureland	TYCY-5309	Sayaka Mine
1993	The Irresponsible Captain Tylor - Music File 2 - ICHIRENTAKUSYOU	Starchild Records	KICA-154	Lt. Kyunghwa Kim
1993	Audio RPG Super Dragon Battle Saurosnite	MYCAL Humming Bird	HBCL-7801	Sharon
1993	Supersonic Legend Cyber Formula LEGEND OF RACERS I	DATAM Polystar	DPCX-5014	Asuka Sugo
1993	Kenyuu Densetsu Yaiba II	Futureland	TYCY-5330	Sayaka Mine
1993	Aretha ~ The Magical Doll's Requiem	Nippon Columbia	COCC-10996	Materia, Chris
1993	The History of Adventure in Alvaleak Continent ~Extra Chapter~ Premium CD Drama	Glodia	N/A	Daytona Faline
1993	Moon Revenge / I am Sailor Moon	Forte Music Entertainment	FMDC-505	Usagi Tsukino/Sailor Moon
1993	Kenyuu Densetsu Yaiba Vocal Collection	Futureland	TYCY-5368	Sayaka Mine
1994	The Irresponsible Captain Tylor - Music File 5 - TENSHINRAMMAN	Starchild Records	KICA-187/8	Lt. Kyunghwa Kim
1994	Derby Stallion II ~Birth of the Divine Stallion~	Nippon Columbia	COCC-11653	Reiko Tajima
1994	Bayoen!! The Megatracks of Puyo Puyo CD	NEC Avenue	NACL-1147	Arle Nadja
1994	The Irresponsible Captain Tylor - Music File 6 - UNPUTENPU	Starchild Records	KICA-197/8	Lt. Kyunghwa Kim
1994	Gokudo-kun Manyuki Gaiden CD Cinema 1 - さよならシスター またきてルーベット	Victor Entertainment	VICL-533	Rubette La Rete
1994	Gokudo-kun Manyuki Gaiden CD Cinema 2 - 我が人生に杭(!?)なし！	Victor Entertainment	VICL-534	Rubette La Rete
1994	Rai: Galactic Civil War Chronicle/Thunder Jet Original Drama Theater	Apollon (Bandai Music Entertainment)	APCM-5043	Princess Simone
1994	Dragon Half Game Sound Memorial	Sony Records	SRCL-2960	Mink
1994	Pretty Soldier Sailor Moon R: The Movie ~Drama Compilation~	Forte Music Entertainment	FMCC-5027	Usagi Tsukino/Sailor Moon
1994	Gokudo-kun Manyuki Gaiden CD Cinema 3 - ラスト・ウォーズ〜バンパイアの逆襲	Victor Entertainment	VICL-535	Rubette La Rete
1994	Super Famicom Magazine Volume 22: New Game Sound Museum	Tokuma Shoten	TIM-SFC22	Mink
1994	BLUE SEED Super Variety Album	Starchild Records	KICA-214	Koume Sawaguchi
1994	The Irresponsible Captain Tylor - Music File 7 - ONTOROUROU	Starchild Records	KICA-215	Lt. Kyunghwa Kim
1994	Gokudo-kun Manyuki Gaiden CD Cinema 4 - 売り飛ばされて大逃亡	Victor Entertainment	VICL-569	Rubette La Rete
1994	Rai: Galactic Civil War Chronicle/Thunder Jet Original Soundtrack Vol. 2	Apollon (Bandai Music Entertainment)	APCM-5055	Princess Simone
1994	Gokudo-kun Manyuki Gaiden: Gokudo Night Live	Victor Entertainment	VICL-40115/6	Rubette La Rete
1994	Gouketsuji Ichizoku 2	Scitron	PCCB-00171	Mikazuki Kurumi, Kurara Hananokoji
1994	The Irresponsible Captain Tylor - Music File 8 - HYAKKARYOURAN	Starchild Records	KICA-220	Lt. Kyunghwa Kim
1995	GAMEST MOOK Vol.3 - Gouketsuji Ichizoku 2	Shinseisha	63381-03	Kurapra Hananokoji
1995	Audio Drama Dancing Whispers: Odoreru Toikitachi	Pioneer LDC	PICA-1056	Wella
1995	Pretty Soldier Sailormoon S: The Movie Drama Compilation	Forte Music Entertainment	FMCC-5055	Usagi Tsukino/Sailor Moon
1995	Street Fighter II Gaiden ~Cammy: Prelude to Battle~	Sony Records	SRCL-3131	Cammy
1995	Makeruna! Makendou	DATAM Polystar	DPCX-5046	Mai Tsurugino
1995	Blue Seed - Yousei Yori Ai wo Komete	Starchild Records	KIDA-102 (Act 2); KIDA-103 (Act 3); KIDA-104 (Act 4); KIDA-105 (Act 5)	Koume Sawaguchi
1995	CD Drama Collections - Angelique ~Koi wa PUSH & PUSH!~	Koei (PolyGram)	KECH-1089	Rosalia de Catargena
1995	Gouketsuji Gaiden - Saikyou Densetsu	Scitron	PCCB-00190	Mikazuki Kurumi, Kurara Hananokoji
1995	Bounty Sword Gaiden -The Steel Dragon-	Pioneer LDC	PICA-2004	Thetis
1995	Phantasy Star ~The Sealed Memory~ Memorial Drama CD & Fanbook	SoftBank	SBCD-0002	Nei/NM-1153
1995	The Irresponsible Captain Tylor SOUND NOTE 1 YAH! YAH! YAH!	VAP	VPCG-84264	Lt. Kyunghwa Kim
1995	Gokudo-kun Manyuki Gaiden - Gokudo Night Live 2	Victor Entertainment	VICL-40183/4	Rubette La Rete
1995	Makeruna! Makendou / Kaiketsu! Makendou ~Hikari Version~	DATAM Polystar	DPDX-5021	Mai Tsurugino
1995	Wedding Peach DREAM COLLECTION	KSS	JSCA-29034	Hiromi Kawanami
1996	Voogie's Angel - Motto Motto RADICAL FIGHT!	NEC Avenue	NADL-1101	Rebecca Sweet Heisen
1996	The Irresponsible Captain Tylor - SOUND NOTE 2 DELIGHTFUL	VAP	VPCG-84276	Lt. Kyunghwa Kim
1996	Animate CD Collection - Wrestle Angels	Movic	ACD-3	Mighty Yukiko
1996	Birdy the Mighty Yuuki Masami Culture School - CD Cinema 1: "from Birth: All Green"	Victor Music Industries	VICL-8196	Birdy
1996	Tanjou S Vocal Collection (Sega Saturn Version)	NEC Avenue	NACL-1220	Mikan Narusawa
1996	Birdy the Mighty Yuuki Masami Culture School - Birdy the Introduction	Victor Music Industries	VICL-15053	Birdy
1996	Wedding Peach Summer Carnival	KSS	JSCA-29041	Hiromi Kawanami
1996	X Character File 3 - Satsuki & Subaru	Victor Entertainment	VICL-18240	Satsuki Yatoji
1996	The Irresponsible Captain Tylor - Koko yori Towa ni ORIGINAL SOUND TRACK ALBUM	VAP	VPCG-84290	Lt. Kyunghwa Kim
1996	Birdy the Mighty Yuuki Masami Culture School - CD Cinema 2: "from King in the Labyrinth"	Victor Music Industries	VICL-8198	Birdy
1996	Gall Force THE REVOLUTION Vocal Collection	Sony Records	SRCL-3677	Rabby
1996	Birdy the Mighty Original Soundtrack 1: Flew	Victor Music Industries	VICL-795	Birdy
1996	Neon Genesis Evangelion - Addition	Starchild Records	KICA-334	Misato Katsuragi
1997	CD Drama Collections - Angelique ~Madowasenaide Innocent Girl~	Koei (PolyGram)	KECH-1110	Rosalia de Catargena
1997	Birdy the Mighty Yuuki Masami Culture School - CD Cinema: Special	Victor Music Industries	VICL-8199	Birdy
1997	Best Of Phantom Quest Corp	Pioneer Entertainment	PICD-1007A	Nanami Rokugou
1997	Eberouge Legend Vol. 2 - Doki Doki · Kanakeki · Theater magic!?	Fujitsu + King Records	KICA-10002	Lindel Falken
1997	Eberouge Legend Vol. 3 - Ojowashi Birthday Festival	Fujitsu + King Records	KICA-10003	Lindel Falken
1997	QuoVadis 2 Radio Drama: Chapter 1	WEA Japan	WPC6-8284	Nelly Catena
1997	Eberouge Legend Vol. 4 - Finally found!? Octagon relationship!	Fujitsu + King Records	KICA-10004	Lindel Falken
1997	QuoVadis 2 Radio Drama: Chapter 2	WEA Japan	WPC6-8285	Nelly Catena
1997	CYBER TROOPERS VIRTUAL-ON "COUNTERPOINT 009A" Episode #16	Futureland	TYCY-5553	Sergeant Mimi Sarpen
1997	Eberouge Legend Vol. 5 - Valentine in the other world	Fujitsu + King Records	KICA-10005	Lindel Falken
1997	QuoVadis 2 Radio Drama: Chapter 3	WEA Japan	WPC6-8286	Nelly Catena
1997	Stereo Drama - POWER DoLLS Vol.1: WEDDING MARCH	VAP	VPCG-84631	Yao Fei-Lun
1997	Stereo Drama - POWER DoLLS Vol.2: ESCAPADE	VAP	VPCG-84632	Yao Fei-Lun
1997	CD Drama - Hyper Police Gaiden: Ideyu, Yu no Hana, Koi no Hana	Nippon Columbia	COCC-14495	Fonne Walkure
1997	CD Drama - Oyama! Kikunosuke	King Records	KICA-1199	Aoi Tokimaki
1997	Breath of Fire III Drama Album	First Smile Entertainment	FSCA-10019	Momo
1997	CD Drama Collections - Angelique Special 2 ~ 3rd story	Koei (PolyGram)	KECH-1118	Rosalia de Catargena
1998	Very Private Lesson - Kyokasho Ni Nai! ORIGINAL SOUNDTRACK	Nippon Columbia	COCC-14830	Teacher Satsuki
1998	Very Private Lesson - Houkago / Aya & Satsuki (Yuko Miyamura & Kotono Mitsuishi)	Nippon Columbia	CODC-1425	Teacher Satsuki
1998	Fire Woman Matoi-Gumi Drama CD	Tokuma Shoten	TDCD-15001/2	Sayaka Katsuragi
1998	UTENA La Fillette Révolutionnaire - Allez, prends-moi pour fiancée	Starchild Records	KICA-396/7	Juri Arisugawa
1998	CD Drama - Desire	King Records	KICA-1212	Ayako Yoshinaga
1998	Pretty Soldier Sailor Moon: Sound Drama	Nippon Columbia	COCC-15204 (Collection 1); COCC-15205 (Collection 2); COCC-15206 (Collection 3)	Usagi Tsukino/Sailor Moon
1998	Pretty Soldier Sailor Moon R: Sound Drama	Nippon Columbia	COCC-15207 (Collection 1); COCC-15208 (Collection 2)	Usagi Tsukino/Sailor Moon
1998	Pretty Soldier Sailor Moon S: Sound Drama Collection	Nippon Columbia	COCC-15209	Usagi Tsukino/Sailor Moon
1998	KIRARA - Before Dawn: Original "Shock Wave" Drama Album	PolyGram	POCX-1104	Imai Kirara (Older)
1998	CD Drama Collections - Angelique Duet ~A Story of The Flying City~	Koei (PolyGram)	KECH-1133	Rosalia de Catargena
1998	Shiritsu Justice Gakuen - Legion of Heroes: Drama Album ~Nerawareta Taiyou Gakuen - Nekketsu Shitou Hen~	Suleputer (Capcom)	CPCA-1014	Kyoko Minazuki, Yayoi Kanzaki
1998	CD DRAMA THE LOST ONE / Last chapter of EVE	King Records	KICA-1222	Marina Houjou
2000	Yukyu Gensoukyoku 3 Perpetual Blue Drama CD	Scitron	PCCB-00407	Liese Arcis
2000	Shiritsu Justice Gakuen - Legion of Heroes: Drama Album ~Nerawareta Taiyou Gakuen - Nekketsu Tantei Hen~	Suleputer (Capcom)	CPCA-1039/40	Kyoko Minazuki, Yayoi Kanzaki
2000	Eve Zero Soundtrack & FM-Eve	C's Ware	NV001	Marina Houjou
2000	Shout Out Loud! Drama CD - Episode 4 (Miracle Dieter MIYUKI)		TGCD-0001	Yukimasa Kadoku / MIYUKI
2001	Eithéa Original Drama Album - Another Story Of Eithéa	First Smile Entertainment	FSCA-10176	Rū
2001	Weiß kreuz - Wish A Dream Collection II ~A four-leaf clover~✤	Marine Entertainment	MMCC-1024	Noi, Asuka Murase, Kyouko
2001	Mistlarouge - Drama Special	Lantis	LACA-5077	Van Seed
2001	Original TV Animation NOIR blanc dans NOIR ~Kuro no Naka no Shiro~	Victor Music Industries	VIZL-57	Mireille Bouquet, Odette Bouquet
2001	Marl DE Jigsaw: Golden Special CD	Nippon Ichi Software	SLPS-20128	Sonia Francis Zeolight
2001	A Little Snow Fairy Sugar Magical Stage 1	Pioneer LDC	PICA-0010	Ginger
2002	Abarenbo Princess Rouge Special Selection	Movic	MACM-2025	Rouge Victoire
2002	Trinity Blood R.A.M. II: Mission I - NEVER LAND	VAP	VPCG-84744	Noélle Bor
2002	Trinity Blood R.A.M. II: Mission II - SILENT NOISE	VAP	VPCG-84745	Noélle Bor
2003	MOBILE SUIT GUNDAM SEED SUIT CD: vol.3 LACUS × HARO	Victor Music Industries	VICL-61073	Haro
2003	Samurai Deeper Kyo Drama CD: Extra Edition ~Samurai Gakuen 2 Fierce Battle / Sports Festival!~	Kodansha	SAMURAI-2	Akari
2004	Beast of East	Marine Entertainment	MMCC-4057	Mermaid Princess of the Sea
2004	My Bride is a Mermaid: Drama CD 1	Amuse Soft Entertainment	AFC-3021	Ren Seto
2004	Magna Carta Drama CD: ~Kakusei Hen - Senjo ni Saita Hana~	M:X (Frontier Works)	FCCT-0023	Rianna
2005	My Bride is a Mermaid: Drama CD 2	Amuse Soft Entertainment	AFC-3022	Ren Seto
2005	Samurai Deeper Kyo Drama CD: Extra Edition ~Samurai Gakuen 3 Burning purity! / School excursion!!~	Kodansha	KYO-31	Akari
2005	Samurai Deeper Kyo Drama CD: Vol. 1 - Devil's Eye	Marine Entertainment	MKC-0005	Akari
2005	ARIA Drama CD 2	Frontier Works	FCCC-0037	Akira E. Ferrari
2005	Magna Carta Drama CD: ~Gekijo Hen - Fukushu no Moeta Hana~	M:X (Frontier Works)	FCCT-0032	Rianna
2005	Samurai Deeper Kyo Drama CD: Vol. 2 - Samurai of Ice Flames	Marine Entertainment	MKC-0006	Akari
2005	Starmani Series - NG Knight Ramune & 40	Starchild Records	KICA-721	Mountain Dew Silver
2005	Starmani Series - BLUE SEED	Starchild Records	KICA-723	Koume Sawaguchi
2006	Samurai Deeper Kyo Drama CD: Vol. 3 - Tensho Kirin	Marine Entertainment	MKC-0007	Akari
2006	Samurai Deeper Kyo Drama CD: Vol. 4 - Suzaku vs Wagtail	Marine Entertainment	MKC-0008	Akari
2006	EVE new generation Special CD: ~Mou Hitotsu no Shima de~	Kadokawa Shoten	NBC-2	Marina Houjou
2008	UTENA La Fillette Révolutionnaire Complete CD-BOX	Starchild Records	KICA-920~8	Juri Arisugawa
2010	Dead or Alive Paradise Kossori Namaroku Voice & Soundtrack CD	Tecmo	TECMO-006	Christie
2013	CaYOCO / Future GPX Cyber Formula SAGA & SAGA II - Other Rounds Collection	VAP	VPCG-84940	Asuka Sugo
2013	Super Danganronpa 2: Another Story (Peach Edition)	Water Orion	WOCD-19	Peko Pekoyama
2016	Danganronpa 3: The End of Hope's Peak High School DRAMA "Kohichi Kizakura no Bunshin"	NBCUniversal Entertainment Japan	GNXA-185102	Peko Pekoyama
2019	Catherine & Catherine: Full Body - Soundtrack Set	Atlus	LNCM-1145	Katherine McBride
