= Man's best friend (disambiguation) =

Man's best friend is a common phrase about domestic dogs.

Man's best friend may also refer to:

== Film and television ==
- Man's Best Friend (1935 film), a feature film about the adventures of a boy and his dog
- Man's Best Friend (1952 film), a cartoon short starring Goofy
- Man's Best Friend (1993 film), a black comedy horror movie
- "Man's Best Friend" (The Ren & Stimpy Show), an unaired episode of The Ren & Stimpy Show

== Music ==
- Man's Best Friend (Livingston Taylor album), a 1980 album by Livingston Taylor
- Man's Best Friend (Sabrina Carpenter album), a 2025 album by Sabrina Carpenter
- Man's Best Friend, a 2021 EP by Cavetown
- "Man's Best Friend", a 1991 song by Ice Cube off of the album Death Certificate
- Mansbestfriend, a series of albums by Sole
- "Man's Best Friend", a 1993 song by Jeff Watson from Around the Sun
- "Man's Best Friend", a 1997 song by Lords of Acid from Our Little Secret
- "Man's Best Friend", a 2019 song by Nebula from Holy Shit
- "Man's Best Friend", a 1982 song by George Clinton from Computer Games

== Other ==
- Man's Best Friend (manga), a 2006 Japanese sex comic

== See also ==
- Dog
