= Zyword =

Japanese manga series

- Cover of the volume as published by Tokyopop in August 2006

ガイオード (Gaiōdo)
- Manga
- Written by: Tamayo Akiyama
- Published by: Kadokawa Shoten
- English publisher: NA: Viz Media
- Imprint: Asuka Comics DX
- Published: September 27, 2000
- Volumes: 1

Zyword (ガイオード, Gaiōdo) is a single-volume manga created by ex-Clamp member Tamayo Akiyama. It was first published in Japan by Kadokawa Shoten in September 2000.

== Story ==
Zyword is an unbalanced dimensional structure held by three connection spells called Dawn, Deep, and Omega. Since these spells are unstable, Zyword is vulnerable to complete chaos. That's exactly what happens when the three Goddesses of Zyword betray its citizens and cast them under a spell that could cause them all to die in an eternal sleep.

Lunatia Araimel, a 14-year-old spell decipherer, and her 15-year-old friend, Roddy Lederide are the only ones that are able to escape from Araimel as the spell locks everyone in ice. Luna and Roddy meet up with a messenger named Zera, who came to the silent sector of Araimel to see what had happened. Not too long after, Luna, Roddy, and Zera are in danger of being killed by monsters called spell-controlled soldiers. Luna is able to defeat the spell monsters, but then, right after, she learns the horrible truth about these monsters—they were just innocent human soldiers manipulated by magic. One of the three Goddesses, Arienna, had magically manipulated these soldiers in order to kill the saviors of Zyword. All of the humans inside the monsters are violently attacked and killed by the forces of magic—except for one, who happens to be a teenage boy with thousands of spells encrypted on his body.

Luna and Roddy keep watch over the boy until he dies—but then the boy awakens when Roddy is under attack and fights of Roddy's attackers. It is revealed early in the story that Luna has been granted the Goddesses' Blessing. Little does Luna know that this blessing is actually also a curse put upon her since she was just a child. Luna remembers her childhood crush, a young man named Deke Diranoia, and swears that she will rescue him from the curse.

== Characters ==
Lunatia Araimel
A 14-year-old spell caster. Luna is confident and strongheaded, and she swears her loyalty to Deke Diranoia. When Luna was five years old, she was "blessed" by the Goddesses, but after experiencing a nightmare, in which a young spell-infected boy was being quarantined (and was hated by the Goddesses), Luna has had extreme hatred towards the Goddesses.
Roddy Lederide
Luna's childhood friend. Also a spell decipherer, he ventures away from Araimel with Luna to fight against the Goddesses. Roddy acts a lot like an older brother to Luna, especially when she tries to be overbearing on Ride.
Ride
A teenage boy who survived death after being trapped in a spell-controlled soldier. The effects of being manipulated and attacked have left him with amnesia. Since he can't even remember his own name, Luna gives him the pseudonym "Ride" after her long-lost friend. His real name is unknown. Ride is dark and moody, usually being very quiet and keeping to himself, as well as distancing himself from Roddy and Luna. After re-awakening from death, he dresses up like a Valstoke assassin, wearing a dark green uniform with armor, and bearing two large battle swords to kill off enemies. Luna and Roddy don't know it, but Ride has unique, and not to mention highly unknown high-level spell techniques that he uses to dissolve spells and fight enemies. Ride's body is encrypted with 70,000 spells. Each spell is to kill him, but they were all miraculously dissolved by the Queen of Araimel. Nobody knows it, but all the spells encrypted on Ride's body are all inactive. Sometimes, Luna tries to be overbearing on Ride, but she is just making sure that he stays safe until he regains his memory. Roddy learns how attached Luna feels to Ride, but convinces her to give him a break. The strange thing that Luna finds about Ride is that she's sure she's met him before long ago, but she doesn't know when or where.
Deke
Luna's childhood crush. He is very kind and sincere, and he was also five-year-old Luna's teacher; he taught her how to use spells. After vomiting blood after a battle with a spell monster, he explains to Luna the reason for his condition; when he was twelve years old, he was cursed with a spell that was slowly killing him. He was being quarantined so that he wouldn't infect others with the deadly spell that he was carrying. At age three, Luna came across him and removed the spell...but even if it's been removed, the evil may have stayed in his body, and may continue to kill him over time.
The King of Araimel
Luna's father and the superior of all of Araimel.
Arienna
The Goddess of Chaos. She manipulated the soldiers of Valstoke and turned them against Luna, Roddy, and Zera.
Shervia
The Goddess of Blue. Later in the story, she ambushed Roddy and was on the verge of casting a manipulative spell on him. A very long time ago, when Luna was young, Shervia had beheaded the Queen of the Fairy World. Witnessing this, Luna was frightened, but Shervia told her to promise to keep it a secret.
Queen of the Fairy World
Superior of the fourth dimension aka the fairy world. When Luna was young, the Queen gave her the egg of a fairy beast. Luna was told to take care of this creature, as it would protect her against the Goddesses.
Ride's Tracker
This is an extremely mysterious man who's after Ride. The reason is that he's out to kill Ride. Apparently, he wants to make sure Ride is dead, seeing that Ride was tainted with a deadly spell when he was young. But no matter what, Ride just won't die.

== Publication ==
Written by Tamayo Akiyama, the manga was published as a single tankōbon volume, which was released under Kadokawa Shoten's Asuka Comics DX imprint on September 27, 2000.

In North America, it was licensed by Tokyopop, which released it on August 8, 2006. It was re-licensed by Viz Media in 2015.
