= Broken Angel =

Broken Angel may refer to:

- Broken Angel (2008 film), directed by Aclan Bates
- Broken Angel (2022 film), directed by Jules Arita Koostachin
- Broken Angel House, a house in Brooklyn, New York
- "Broken Angel" (song), a 2010 song by Arash

== See also ==
- Broken Angels (disambiguation)
