= Wild Rock =

Japanese manga

- Wild Rock as published by Blu
- Genre: Yaoi, Adult
- Manga
- Written by: Kazusa Takashima
- Published by: Biblos; Libre Publishing
- English publisher: NA: Blu Manga
- Magazine: Magazine Be × Boy
- Original run: November 2001 – March 2002
- Volumes: 1

Wild Rock (ワイルド・ロック) is an explicit yaoi manga created by Kazusa Takashima and is published in English by Blu Manga, the boys love publishing division of Tokyopop. It is published in Spain by Ediciones La Cúpula, in Italy by Kappa Edizioni, in France by Taifu Comics, and in German by Carlsen Manga. In May 2007, Wild Rock was re-released in print in Japan called the Libre Edition. This volume includes a new story that is a sequel to the extra story Child Rock.

== Plot summary ==
The story is set in prehistory, involving two rival tribes, the East Forest Tribe and the Lakeside Tribe and the budding romance between the leaders' sons, Emba and Yuuen. The book is divided into three parts:

The first focuses on Emba and Yuuen. Yuuen is the second son to the East Forest Chief, Yuni, and seems incapable of aiding his tribe with the hunting. As they lose more of their game to the Lakeside Tribe, most specifically that Tribe heir Emba, Yuni forces Yuuen to act and gain Emba's favor, thus giving their Tribe a chance to hunt. Yuuen is thus required to dress as a woman (as he has effeminate features) and distract Emba. However, both young men fall in love with each other for real and Yuuen grows increasingly guilty at deceiving Emba. This guilt nearly consumes him when Emba becomes seriously injured saving his life, and much is left to wonder if they will ever be together, coming from different tribes and Yuuen supposedly getting Emba's attention by pretending to be a girl.

The second story, Innocent Lies, is a prequel to the first story, following Yuni and Emba's father Selem as younger men. The two meet when Yuni falls into an animal trap set up by Selem and they are forced into each other's company as Selem nurses him back to health. While Selem is aware that Yuni is the heir to the East Forest Tribe, Yuni doesn't know at first that Selem is the heir to the Lakeside Tribe. As they spend more time with each other, the feelings between them grow stronger in spite of the positions the two of them are in. Sadly, even as they acknowledge their feelings, neither man is willing to turn his back on his fate.

The third story, Child Rock, takes place some years after the events in Wild Rock, as Yuuen and Emba spend the day together babysitting their baby nephew Nava (the child of Yuuen's brother and Emba's sister).

== Drama CD ==
In November 2002, a drama cd of Wild Rock was released in Japan. The cd follows the events of the original manga very closely, however the tracks go in chronological order of the story, starting with Innocent Lies, then Wild Rock and finally Child Rock.

Japanese voice actors:

Yuuen: Jun Fukuyama

Emba: Toshiyuki Morikawa

Yuni (younger): Yamaguchi Kappei

Selem (younger): Shin-ichiro Miki

Yuni (older): Inoue Kazuhiko

Selem (older): Kosugi Juurouta

Yuuli (Yuuen's older brother): Takahashi Hiroki

== Reception ==
The reviewer for Manga-News notes that while the story of two enemies who fall in love is classical, Wild Rock innovates by setting this story in prehistoric times, noting that this allows the author to draw many bare-chested young men while also divorcing the story from expectations for the genre. Julie Rosato felt the work was "undeniably sexy" and that it did not rely on explicit acts to be so, praising Blu for getting the license to this fan-favourite work.
