= Mouryou Kiden =

Japanese manga series

魍魎姫伝 (Mōryō Kiden)
- Genre: Fantasy
- Manga
- Written by: Tamayo Akiyama
- Published by: Kadokawa Shoten
- English publisher: NA: Tokyopop
- Magazine: Monthly Asuka
- Original run: 1994 – 1995
- Volumes: 3

Mouryou Kiden: Legend of the Nymph (魍魎姫伝, Mōryō Kiden) is a manga written in three parts by Tamayo Akiyama, a former member of the all-female Japanese mangaka group Clamp.

== Plot ==
Mouryou Kiden takes place in a world hidden in fog, which is ruled by Mikage, the goddess of light. Mikage hails from the Fuyo Palace, in which she protects the Pillars of the Sun.

The daughter of the goddess of darkness, Ayaka, attacks the Fuyo Palace in order to destroy the Pillars of the Sun and revive her mother. Instead she meets Kai, the son of Mikage, and instantly falls in love with him. When Kai, who doesn't know who the girl is, speaks about her, calling her a monster, she flees crying. He follows her to the kingdom of Reiki, only to discover that the enemy kingdom is being protected by his mother.

== Characters ==
Ayaka
Initially thought to be the daughter of Reiki, the goddess of darkness, and a monster, she is in fact the goddess of the moon and twin sister of Mikage. After Mikage assassinated her and sealed her body in the underworld, hiding her soul, Kai's father found and placed her soul in the body of a newborn baby. She falls in love with Kai, deeming it to be love at first sight, but it is later revealed the two met as young children, another memory erased by Mikage.
Kai
Known as the Son of Mikage, the goddess of light, and the previous king. He believes that his father was killed by Reiki, the goddess of darkness. As revenge, he fights to prevent Reiki's resurrection. In truth, Mikage is the one who killed his father. Learning the truth causes Kai to use his power to destroy the Pillars of the Sun with his white flute.
Mikage
Known as the goddess of light, she was born as the goddess of the sun as well as Ayaka's twin sister. Due to a prediction from the prophet Rajin, it was believed that one of the twin sisters would become a monster. The sisters were separated and Ayaka imprisoned, due to the assumption that the goddess of the moon would be more likely to become a monster than the goddess of the sun. Mikage becomes the queen, but soon finds out that the man she loved, Kai's father, was in love with Ayaka. In a jealous rage, she kills Ayaka. Upon learning that Kai's father, the king, had saved Ayaka's soul, she kills him too and covers the world in a dense fog, shutting her eyes so that no one would discover her guilt.
Reiki
The goddess of darkness and initially thought to be Ayaka's mother. When the Pillars of the Sun are destroyed, the goddess of the darkness expects to become the new queen. Instead, she is taken to the underworld and the fog covering everything suddenly vanishes. Later, it is revealed that she is nothing but a manifestation of Mikage's own hatred. She tries to tempt Ayaka to come to her, hoping to have a chance of eating her soul.
Kai's father
He first appears as a man with a death mask, saving Ayaka on multiple occasions. Though his identity is revealed only at the end, he is the one that gave Ayaka the chance to be reborn, and the only one, apart from the prophet Rajin, who knows the truth about her identity.
Kurama
Leader of the Oni-Tengu, he is a skilled fighter and a womanizer who is also love with Ayaka. After the destruction of the Pillars of the Sun, he escorts Ayaka in her quest to find the Fuyo Palace and witnesses Kai destroying the Pillars of the Moon with his black flute. He was born with three lives due to absorbing his brothers' life energy in the womb, but he gives one to Kai and one to Ayaka.
Rajin
The prophet who foretold that one of the twin goddesses would become a monster. Another of his prophecies tells that the world will be destroyed and recreated by the goddess of twilight.
