= Suki: A Like Story =

Manga by Clamp

- Cover of the original Japanese tankōbon, volume 1

すき。だからすき (Suki. Dakara Suki)
- Genre: Romance, Mystery
- Manga
- Written by: Clamp
- Published by: Kadokawa Shoten
- English publisher: NA: Tokyopop
- Magazine: Asuka
- Original run: 1999 – 2000
- Volumes: 3

Suki: A Like Story (Japanese: すき。だからすき, Hepburn: Suki. Dakara Suki) is a three-volume manga by Clamp. The title literally means "I like you, that's why I like you". It was published in English by Tokyopop (although their license has since expired).

== Plot ==
Suki follows the story of Hinata Asahi, also known as Hina, a childlike teenager who loves teddy bears. She lives alone in her house and early in the story, her new homeroom teacher moves into the empty house next door. Shiro Asou, her new teacher, becomes her first crush and he seems to take an interest in her as well. However, this simple love story grows complicated as Shiro's interest in Hina is put into question as more sinister elements are placed in the story, all while forcing Hinata to grow up at the same time.

== Characters ==
Hinata Asahi (旭ひなた, Asahi Hinata)
Although her full name is Hinata, she likes people to call her Hina. Sixteen-year-old Hina gets excellent grades, but is still very naïve and sees the world with childlike wonder and innocence. Hina chooses to live on her own, with two teddy bears named Waka and Tono and her newfound friend, a cat. She wants to live on her own to accommodate her father's hectic schedule.
Her father is the chairman of the school and he also owns many businesses. He hires Shiro Asou, a bodyguard, to protect her from another kidnapping attempt (she had been kidnapped nine times before). Because her father always pays the ransom, no matter how large, Hina has been kidnapped many times. She later develops deeper feelings towards Shiro.
Shiro Asou (麻生史郎, Asō Shirō)
Seemingly cold and unfeeling, thirty-two-year-old Shiro moves into the unoccupied house next door to Hina's, and is also her new substitute teacher. He is actually hired by Hina's father to protect her from another kidnapping. Oblivious to Hina's feelings of love, he (at first) seems to think of Hina as merely another job. He later recognizes her feelings, but he rejects them. He had fallen in love with a client before, but he always feels a pang of guilt whenever he thinks about her. The woman he had fallen in love with before, threw herself into the path of a bullet meant for him, sparing his life. Although she survived the wound, she was a diplomatic guest, and later returned to her home country and married.
Touko Shinohara (篠原燈子, Shinohara Tōko)
Hina's best and lifelong friend, Touko is always looking out for the girl. Touko also is very suspicious about Asou. Many boys like her.
Emi Kishitani (岸谷笑, Kishitani Emi)
Emi is another friend of Hina's. Opinionated and loud-mouthed, she never gives up the chance to explain how childish and naïve Hina is. Emi's father borrowed a lot of money from yakuza loansharks and he doesn't have any to repay them. Emi concocts a scheme to help her father kidnap Hina for the ransom that Hina's father is guaranteed to pay. After she is rescued by Shiro, Hina, in her loyalty and naïveté, forgives her and asks her father to loan Emi's family the money that they need. Emi is ashamed of what she's done and is grateful for Hina's forgiveness.
Tomoaki Namiya (奈宮智秋, Namiya Tomoaki)
A famous 21-year-old writer, Hina refers to Tomoaki as Tomo-kun, a name that he hasn't been called in at least ten years. The genres he writes in are erotica and children's books. Tomo is the writer of Hina's favorite series of children's books, all featuring bears. Like Hina, Tomo is very carefree and sometimes hard to handle. He has also hired a bodyguard to protect him. Later in the story, Tomo writes a series of books, titled "Suki", that mirror the lives of Hina and Shiro, much like in Chobits, another work by Clamp.
Masaya Kizu (祈津昌也, Kizu Masaya)
Kizu is a colleague of Shiro, both having worked with the Secret Police. Now employed as Tomo's bodyguard, for reasons unexplained in the book, though it was implied that the circumstances are similar to Hina's.

== Important locations ==
Hina's house
Hina's house is a large, two story home in a safe neighborhood. Shiro moves into the house next door to hers, to keep a watchful eye over her. Her house is (unbeknownst to her) tapped with multiple cameras and microphones, placed secretly by Shiro, to monitor Hina.
Outo Private High School for Girls (私立桜都女子高等学校, Shiritsu Ōto Joshi Kōtō Gakkō)
The girls-only high school that Hina attends and Shiro's place of employment. Outo High has also appeared in Legal Drug (along with Shiro and a graduating Hina).

Chuo Doori Shopping District (中央通商店街, Chūōdoori Shōtengai):

MARUKAWA Books
Hina's favorite place to buy books, mostly by her favorite author, Tomo.
Caffe Piffle Princess
A favorite place of Tomo's. He can often be seen writing his latest book (children's or otherwise) at his favorite booth near the door. The cafe is themed around the Piffle Princess, a cute mascot character that appears frequently in Suki and other works by Clamp.

== Media ==
=== Manga ===
Tokyopop licensed Suki: A Like Story for an English-language release in North America and published the three volumes from February 10, 2004, to June 8, 2004. However, all three are now out of print.

=== Volume list ===
No.	Original release date	Original ISBN	North American release date	North American ISBN
1	June 17, 1999	978-4-04-924780-0	February 10, 2004	978-1-59182-760-3
2	December 14, 1999	978-4-04-924799-2	April 13, 2004	978-1-59182-761-0
3	July 17, 2000	978-4-04-924835-7	June 8, 2004	978-1-59182-762-7

=== CLAMP in Wonderland ===
Suki, along with most of CLAMP's other titles, appeared in CLAMP's second music video, CLAMP in Wonderland 2, which was the first time the manga was animated.
