= Legal Drug =

Manga

- Cover art from volume 3 of the English release of Legal Drug, published by Tokyopop

合法 ドラッグ (Gōhō Doraggu)
- Genre: Comedy, Supernatural, Mystery
- Manga
- Written by: Clamp
- Published by: Kadokawa Shoten
- English publisher: Dark Horse Comics
- Magazine: Mystery DX; Shojo Teikoku; Monthly Asuka
- Original run: November 2000 – September 2003 (Note: Permanent hiatus)
- Volumes: 3
- Manga

Drug & Drop
- Written by: Clamp
- Published by: Kadokawa Shoten
- Magazine: Young Ace
- Original run: 2011 – 2013 (indefinite hiatus)
- Volumes: 2

Legal Drug (Japanese: 合法 ドラッグ, Hepburn: Gōhō Doraggu) is a manga series by Clamp. The main artist in this serialization is Tsubaki Nekoi. It is published in Japan by Kadokawa Shoten and it is published in English by Tokyopop who have currently released 3 volumes as of 2005. The series is also known as Lawful Drugstore or Gouhou Drug in Japan. Since then, however, the license has lapsed, and Dark Horse Comics picked up the publishing rights in 2014.

The series was put on hold in 2003, as the magazine it was serialized in ceased its publication. It resumed serialization in November 2011 in Kadokawa's Young Ace Magazine under the new title, Drug and Drop (ドラッグ&ドロップ).

The four leading characters of Legal Drug appear in CLAMP in Wonderland 2, which is the first time Kakei and Saiga are seen animated; Kazahaya and Rikuo had been previously animated during a brief appearance in the xxxHolic anime, episode 6, and xxxHolic Kei episode 13.

== Plot ==
When Kazahaya Kudo collapses in the snow one night and is on the verge of death, he is rescued by a mysterious young man, Rikuo Himura, who takes him back to a pharmacy named the Green Drugstore.

Kazahaya, apparently running from his past, takes up work at the Green Drugstore alongside Rikuo. He comments that although Rikuo rescued him, he really feels indebted to the store's owner, Kakei, whom he thanks for his current accommodation and job. While their day job is quite simple, the boys are persuaded and, in some cases, practically forced by Kakei to take on strange extra jobs outside the store, which make use of their supernatural powers.

== Characters ==
Kazahaya Kudo (栩堂 風疾, Kudō Kazahaya)
Voiced by: Tetsuya Kakihara (xxxHOLiC)
The main protagonist of the series. Above all else, Kazahaya does not want to die - a fact which seems to be linked to a girl from his past named Kei, his twin sister. In his thoughts, he has indicated that he and Kei lived a secluded life, effectively trapped on a single property where no other children lived, and also indicates that neither he nor Kei ever finished their schooling even at the elementary level.
At the very start of the series, Kazahaya is found lying in the snow, having apparently run away from his former home and very nearly freezing to death, before being found by Rikuo, who brings him back to the Green Drugstore. Since then, he has always been trying to earn money so that he might live alone, which is the main reason why he accepts the 'extra' jobs offered by Kakei. He has a supernatural power which is something like psychometry in that he can see the "memories" of things or persons when he touches them; he may also possess some empathic ability as he seems capable of absorbing emotions as well as memories, and on at least one occasion has channeled the present visual perspective of another person (Rikuo).
While at times he may seem rather helpless, or at least hopelessly naive, he has many skills and abilities which make him highly capable in certain tasks. Specifically, some of his behaviors and abilities seem remarkably similar to a cat, including a heightened sense of smell and vision, several demonstrations of cat-like agility and speed, and his tendency to look like an angry kitten when upset. Kazahaya is noted to be seventeen-years-old at the start of the series, and is smaller, slimmer and has a much more feminine appearance than Rikuo, to the point that he can be accurately described as "pretty". He gets emotional easily, and frequently plays into Rikuo's hands when teased due to his quick temper.
In Drug & Drop, it's revealed that he is related by blood to Shuichiro Kudo from Wish and that their family is a very powerful one.
Rikuo Himura (火群 陸王, Himura Rikuō)
Voiced by: Atsushi Kakehashi (xxxHOLiC)
The second protagonist of the series, Rikuo is Kazahaya's current co-worker and roommate, as well as the one who found Kazahaya lying nearly dead in the snow. Similarly to Kazahaya, his mysterious past is also centered on a woman, this one named Tsukiko. It appears that they lived together at some point, though at present the exact nature of their relationship remains unknown. Rikuo often comes across as being cold and insensitive, sometimes even sarcastic, and takes great pleasure in teasing Kazahaya. However, in spite of his nature, he is always the one who comes to Kazahaya's rescue when certain jobs go wrong. He has powers similar to telekinesis, as he can break things like cups, locks and branches.
Kazahaya claims that he and Rikuo are the same age, meaning Rikuo is also 17. Of the two protagonists, Rikuo is much calmer and quieter, and in appearance is taller and more masculine - high-school girls appear to come to the store often specifically to ask Rikuo where some random item is as an excuse to talk to the handsome boy. Rikuo has tattoos on his right shoulder and back, which has been implied to have a connection to Tsukiko. An interesting quirk about Rikuo is that he likes sweet things such as chocolate, which is considered unusual and un-masculine in Japanese society.
Kakei (花蛍)
The owner of the Green Drugstore, Kakei is the one who sends the two boys out on missions, usually without telling them everything first. He seems to know exactly how things will turn out due to his power of precognition, however it has been noted that this power cannot be used on someone more powerful than himself, as in the case of his failures to find Tsukiko for Rikuo.
Kakei is a very beautiful person and has a gentle, kindly air about him. However, he is also very mysterious, and his expression often changes quickly from gentle and kindly to eerie and perhaps even dangerous. He is also noted to have a cruel, and even sadistic side to his nature, although this side of his personality is mostly actualized in almost-subtle teasing. It turns out that the reason he opened the Drugstore is in order to protect Kazahaya and everyone he cares about.
It is later revealed that Kakei and Saiga's true forms are Hisui and Kokuyo from Wish, but many years after the events that took place in that story.
Saiga (斎峨)
Saiga is often seen hanging around in the Green Drugstore - usually napping, smoking, or both. He also always wears a pair of dark sunglasses which he never seems to take off. While it is unknown whether he has any supernatural powers like the rest of the cast, it was mentioned that he is extremely good at pickup souls, finding people, and is currently working on helping Rikuo find Tsukiko. He is Kakei's lover and is skilled in domestic areas, such as sewing and making food.

=== Minor characters ===
Kei Kudo (栩堂 炯, Kudō Kei)
Kei is Kazahaya's sister and not much is known about her, although Kazahaya mentioned that she has "cat-like" qualities. The reason Kazahaya left her has not yet been clarified; his only explanation is a guilty, "But if we had stayed together, it would have been either you or me." It is revealed in Drug and Drop that she can see the future of objects by touching them, similar to Kazahaya's ability to see the past.
Tsukiko (月湖)
Tsukiko is a woman from Rikuo's past who has gone missing. It is thought she may be dead as when she went missing Rikuo found her room "all splattered with blood". Her relationship with Rikuo is unknown; he is determined to find her and is certain that she is still alive. It has been implied that Tsukiko cannot swim and that Rikuo once saved her from drowning. In recent chapters it is clarified that Tsukiko is Rikou's elder sister, and also his only living blood relative. She appears in one of Kazahaya's dreams and speaks to him, suggesting an ability to enter dreams. She can also see the future, albeit only a day or so ahead.
Satoru Nayuki (名雪 智, Nayuki Satoru)
Satoru is a student at an all-boys private school. He is Vice President on the student-body government and was a victim of attempted rape. Unbeknown to his classmates and himself, he has the ability to project a piece of his soul out of his body in order to fulfill the desires of his subconscious.

== Crossover with other CLAMP works ==
In the second volume of Legal Drug, Kakei purchases clothes from "Piffle Princess" for Kazahaya to give to a girl from Ohto High in exchange for her uniform. In Angelic Layer, this was a store selling Angelic Layer merchandise where people could practice fighting with their Angels. In Suki, Piffle Princess appears as Caffe Piffle Princess, a café frequented by the main characters. Piffle Princess also appears in other CLAMP works, including Chobits, xxxHolic, Tsubasa: Reservoir Chronicle, Kobato, and Cardcaptor Sakura.

In the world in which Legal Drug occurs, Piffle Princess appears to be a popular clothing store. A dress from Piffle Princess is given to a student at Ohto High (私立桜都女子高等学校, Shiritsu Ōto Joshi Kōtō Gakkō) also known as "Barf High" (ゲロ高, Gerokō) (the Japanese word for vomit (謳吐) is also spelled Ohto). Hinata Asahi from Suki — Hinata, her teacher Shiro Asou, and Ohto High all appear in Suki as well.

The Atashi character from Chobits appears, such as on a clock in the Green Drugstore.

Rikuo and Kazahaya have appeared in xxxHolic; Watanuki is sent out to purchase a hangover remedy and enters the drugstore where the two work. He sees ghostly images around them (Tsukiko and Kei) and observes that there is some strong bond between the two. Furthermore, the High Moon Urn Yūko Ichihara has obtained in volume 5 from the "anything store" is actually the same vase retrieved by Kazahaya and Rikuo in volume 2 of Legal Drug. In volume 2, Kazahaya walks through the space between a telephone pole and a wall, as does Watanuki in xxxHolic. Watanuki, after inheriting the shop from Yuko, appears as Kakei's customer in Drug & Drop.

The Green Drugstore and its staff have made small appearances in Kobato. The Green Drugstore, Kakei, Rikuo and Kazahaya are identifiable in the background of Drop 5 and two characters who look like Rikuo and Kazahaya walk past Kobato in Exam 9.

Kohaku from Wish has appeared recently in this series. Chapter 15 of Drug & Drop reveals that: Saiga is Kokuyou and Kakei is Hisui from Wish.

== Release ==
Written by Clamp, the chapters of Legal Drug appeared as a serial in the manga magazine Mystery DX from November 2000 to May 2001. In 2001, it resumed serialization in Shojo Teikoku from July to November; afterwards, it was transferred to Asuka, where it ran from June 2002 to September 2003. It was then placed on hiatus.

The series is licensed in English by Dark Horse Comics and available on BookWalker. The series is also licensed in France by Editions Tonkam.

=== Legal Drug ===
No.	Original release date	Original ISBN	North American release date	North American ISBN
01	June 1, 2001	978-4-04-853341-6	October 1, 2004	978-1-59182-485-5
02	July 1, 2002	978-4-04-853519-9	February 8, 2005	978-1-59532-421-4
03	September 1, 2003	978-4-04-853668-4	June 7, 2005	978-1-59532-422-1

=== Drug and Drop ===
No.	Original release date	Original ISBN	North American release date	North American ISBN
01	February 1, 2013	978-4-04120-487-0	January 20, 2015	978-1-61655-595-5
02	October 21, 2013	978-4-04120-872-4	May 26, 2015	978-1-61655-627-3
