= Hands Off! (manga) =

Japanese manga series

- Volume 5 cover

その手をどけろ (Sono Te o Dokero)
- Genre: Psychological
- Manga
- Written by: Kasane Katsumoto
- Published by: Kadokawa Shoten
- English publisher: NA: Tokyopop
- Magazine: Monthly Asuka
- Original run: 1998 – 2001
- Volumes: 8

Hands Off! (Japanese: その手をどけろ, Hepburn: Sono Te o Dokero; lit. "Off Your Hand!") is a manga series by Kasane Katsumoto (克本 かさね, Katsumoto Kasane), spanning eight volumes. It was published by Kadokawa Shoten and serialized in Asuka Magazine; in North America, it is licensed by Tokyopop. It is the sequel to Don't Call Us Angels (俺たちを天使と呼ぶな, Oretachi o Tenshi to Yobuna), also known as Hands Off! Don't Call Us Angels.

A Hands Off! Drama CD has also been released.

== Story ==
Hands Off! is about Kotarou Oohira, an effeminate fifteen-year-old who unknowingly possesses a touch-based ESP. He goes to live with his grandfather and his cousin Tatsuki Oohira, who also possesses psychic abilities. Tatsuki has the power of postcognition which he received from touching his cousin as a child. At their school they meet up with Yuuto Urushiyama, another psychic with the ability to read people's emotional auras. Whenever Tatsuki and Yuuto come into physical contact with Kotarou, their powers are heightened although it's usually at his discomfort and he ends up slapping or (in Yuuto's case) kicking them away. Kotarou has a habit of getting himself involved in dangerous situations so Tatsuki and Yuuto must frequently invoke the use of their powers to rescue him. However, the more Tatsuki uses his powers the more he begins to lose his sense of reality, leading him into a dangerous downward spiral.

== Characters ==
=== Main characters ===
Kotarou Oohira
A high school freshman who despises his effeminacy. In middle school he was teased about it to the point of other boys dressing him up like a girl. Kotarou has a touch based ESP that appears to be healing, but it also seems to enhance other people's abilities. He is unaware of his powers until Volume 7. These powers appears to scare him a lot. His ESP may be similar to Udou's (The main character of Ore-tachi o Tenshi to Yobuna). In Volume 8 he uses his powers to bring Tatsuki back to life. He has been dating Mio.
Tatsuki Oohira
Kotarou's cousin. As a kid he developed postcognitive powers that manifested themselves when he touched Kotarou. Tatsuki hates his power leading him to be less than friendly towards his cousin when he first moves in. However, as the series progresses he begins to develop fond feelings for his cousin and finds himself unable to blame Kotarou for his powers. This causes him a lot of turmoil and confusion. After the death of his grandfather he appears to have a psychotic break. After this he gains other powers than postcognition, most likely a form of psychokinesis. He attempted to kill Kazuma twice, once with his new powers and the other time by strangulation (both times occur in Vl 7). but was stopped by Kotarou. After this he appears to have gained a semblance of sanity. He has a great dislike of the child Akira and hates hospitals.
Yuuto Urushiyama
A classmate of Kotarou and Tatsuki. Friendly but a bit of a goofball, Yuuto can analyze people by reading the colors their emotional auras (and hence also has ESP). As a kid he disliked this power since all the colors of the people he saw were dirty gray. These colors scared him and he did not look directly at people to avoid looking at them. After meeting a girl named Kyoko who had light and friendly colors (such as white and lime green) he began to change. However, after hearing that Kyoko had a crush on someone he grew depressed thinking she only hung out with him out of pity. He refused to speak to her and on her last day of school she came to talk to him and he ran away. After she left, he realized that if he looked closer at people their auras were actually not dirty gray but a mixture of colors. He is currently good friends with Kotarou and Tatsuki and has a crush on Karen. He is a bit of a playboy.

=== Secondary characters ===
Karen
A photographer that meets up with the boys and attends the same school. She appears to have powers herself that manifest through her camera although this is not directly confirmed. She does know that the boys are gifted and it appears she may have a crush on Yuuto but if she does she acts very aloof about it. She likes to follow people around so she can get good pictures of them.
Kazuma Koutari
A boy that goes to the same school as Kotarou and Tatsuki. As a child he touched Tatsuki and also gained postcognitive powers. His mother was insane and drove herself, his sister, and him over a bridge. He survived, but his sister and mother did not. He blames his powers, and thus Tatsuki, for this. He has decided that Tatsuki has to suffer and has set out to try to kill him. He attempts to use Kotarou for this but fails when he touches Kotarou and all of his emotions come spilling out. He also accidentally kills Tatsuki's grandfather when he cuts the brakes of Tatsuki's motorcycle in an attempt to kill Tatsuki. He is currently in jail for killing Kotarou's grandfather and attempting to kill Tatsuki.
Akira
A little boy who makes friends with Kotarou. Tatsuki greatly dislikes him. He appears to have powers of his own - possibly the power to block other people's powers (Volume 4 Acts 11 - 12) although this is currently unconfirmed. Also in Volume 7 he stares at Tatsuki who suddenly develops a severe head pain. Yuuto is unable to see Akira's father's aura. Something sinister appears to be going on with Akira and his father.
Kouichi Udou
A very tall man who briefly appears on certain volumes. He appears to have a power similar to Kotarou's and also has the ability to stop other people from seeing his aura and also he seems to have the power to heal as seen in volume 3 when he first appears. He is very good at basketball and good friends with Kiba. He appears to want to help Tatsuki and Kotarou very much but is holding himself back. When he gives Yuuto a look at his aura (which is gold), it almost blinds Yuuto. He stars in Ore-tachi wo Tenshi to Yobuna.
Atusushi Kiba
A police officer with powers similar to those of Tatsuki and Kazuma. He appears to have gone through something similar to Tatsuki and also appears to have much more control over his powers than Tatsuki. He occasionally helps out the boys but is very aloof about it. He is very good friends with Udou and is working with him to help Tatsuki and Kotarou. He stars in Ore-tachi wo Tenshi to Yobuna.
Mio
A pretty young woman who Kotarou has been dating. She doesn't know about any of the boys' powers, although she understands that something is going on with them. She appears to care a lot for Kotarou.
Chiba
A good friend of Mio who at first hates Kotarou for dating her friend. She has cracked various plots to break them up but has yet to succeed. She appears to have stopped hating Kotarou as much as she did in later volumes and at one point attempts to cheer him up (in her own way) although she still seems to hold a grudge against him.
