= Shout Out Loud! =

Japanese manga series by Satosumi Takaguchi

叫んでやるぜ! (Sakende Yaruze!)
- Genre: Comedy, Romance, Yaoi
- Manga
- Written by: Satosumi Takaguchi
- Published by: Kadokawa Shoten
- English publisher: NA: Blu
- Magazine: Monthly Asuka
- Original run: 1996 – 2000
- Volumes: 5

Shout out Loud! (Japanese: 叫んでやるぜ!, Hepburn: Sakende Yaruze!) is a yaoi manga series created by Satosumi Takaguchi. It was originally serialized in the shōjo magazine Monthly Asuka.

The story revolves around Shino Hisae, a thirty-five-year-old yaoi anime voice actor, who despite his age still looks like a teenager. Due to his looks, he is often subject to advances from his co-workers Tenryu-san and Mizusawa-kun. Not only does he have to deal with these advances but also has drama and tension at home with his seventeen-year-old son Hisae Nakaya who also is just discovering his homosexuality.

This series may be categorized as a yaoi but it has less sexual contact that other series in the genre, until the last two volumes.

== Plot summary ==
Shino had gotten his high school girlfriend pregnant, knowing that he would become a father because he very much loved his girlfriend. However his girlfriend, who came from a wealthy family, left him so that she "wouldn't interfere with his goal of becoming an actor".

The story actually begins when Shino's son Nakaya finds the apartment of his father. He finds out the yaoi aspect of Shino's job later and is not quite pleased, though he ends up reconciling with it. When Nakaya has a false pregnancy alarm with his girlfriend, he begins to relate to his father more.

At work, Shino is constantly being hit on by thirty-seven-year-old Tenryu and twenty-something year-old Mizusawa. They're both bisexual and play the seme to Shino's uke. Tenryu is just getting over a divorce with his wife, and is going through emotional turmoil as his wife has forbidden him from seeing their seven-year-old daughter ever again. He turns to Shino during the turmoil and consequently things go further than Shino is at first comfortable with.

In the third volume, a Canadian hockey player becomes Nakaya's coach and Nakaya becomes infatuated with him. They end up a couple, much to Shino's dismay, who believes that the homosexuality seen in his son is because he plays uke so many times in yaoi anime series.

== Characters ==
Shino Hisae
A thirty-five-year-old voice actor for the show Miracle Dieter Miyuki, struggling with his co-worker's advancements. He's raising his only son by himself to become a good person
Nakaya Hisae
A seventeen-year-old high school student with an avid zeal for hockey; he loses half a tooth from it at one point. He's very protective of his overly naive father, and is very confused about his own sexuality.
Tenryu
Thirty-seven-year-old voice actor who has just gotten divorced and is suffering from sexual turmoil. He is one of the people advancing on Shino.
Mizusawa
A young twenty-something year-old bisexual voice actor who has taken a liking to Shino, and is often giving him a hard time.
Fuse Akihi
An attractive and talented hockey player, whose knee injury prevents him from participating in the world competitions.

== Media ==
=== Volume list ===
No.	Original release date	Original ISBN	North American release date	North American ISBN
01	1996	978-4-0485-2645-6	2006	978-1-5981-6316-2
02	1997	978-4-0485-2785-9	August 1, 2006	978-1-5981-6317-9
03	1998	978-4-0485-2929-7	December 12, 2006	978-1-5981-6318-6
04	1999	978-4-0485-3058-3	April 3, 2007	978-1-5981-6319-3
05	2000	978-4-0485-3159-7	August 7, 2007	978-1-5981-6320-9
