= List of Cowboy Bebop chapters =

This is a list of manga related to the anime series Cowboy Bebop.

== Cowboy Bebop: Shooting Star ==
The manga series written by Kuga Cain loosely based on the anime series. It is an alternative telling of the story featured in the anime television series, with some changes to character designs, and the character of Ed portrayed as being male. While the original Japanese manga chapters were called "Shoots" without titles, the English version adds movie titles to each chapter (akin to the anime's frequent use of song titles). The serialisation was canceled in mid-1998, leaving some plot points unresolved.

No.	Original release date	Original ISBN	English release date	English ISBN
1	May 1, 1998	978-4-04-852935-8	April 8, 2003	978-1-59182-297-4
Shoot 01. "You Only Live Twice"; Shoot 02. "The Kid Stays in the Picture"; Shoot 03. "Dog Day Afternoon"; Shoot 04. "The Sting"; Shoot 05. "Funny Girl"; "Behind the Bebop, the Untold Story"
2	October 1, 1998	978-4-04-852997-6	June 10, 2003	978-1-59182-298-1
Shoot 06. "The Man Who Would Be King"; Shoot 07. "Midnight Cowboy"; Shoot 08. "The Great Escape"; Shoot 09. "In Cold Blood"; Shoot 10. "The Hustler"; "Behind the Bebop, the Untold Story"

== Cowboy Bebop ==
The manga series written by Yutaka Nanten. The series includes new stand alone stories based in the world of the anime.

No.	Original release date	Original ISBN	English release date	English ISBN
1	April 8, 1999	978-4-04-853078-1	April 23, 2002	978-1-931514-91-0
"It's Showtime" (イッツ・ショータイム); "We Will Rock You" (ウイ・ウィル・ロック・ユー); "Cheap Trick" (チープ・トリック); "Black Diamond" (ブラック・ダイヤモンド)
2	November 1, 1999	978-4-04-853136-8	June 25, 2002	978-1-931514-48-4
"She's a Rainbow" (シース・ア・レインボウ); "Great Deceiver" (グレート・ディシーバー); "Bebop Special Short" (ビバップ・スペシャル・ショート); "Thinking Bird, Happy Song" (シンキング・バート・ハッピー・ソング); "Like a Rolling Stone" (ライク・ア・ローリング・ストーン)
3	April 10, 2000	978-4-04-853185-6	August 20, 2002	978-1-59182-033-8
"What's Your Number" (ホワッツ・ユア・ナンバー); "Fight For Your Right" (ファイト・フォー・ユア・ライト)

=== Chapter not released in tankōbon format ===
- "Monkey Magic"
