= Tamayo Akiyama =

Manga artist and author

Tamayo Akiyama 秋山 たまよ
- Born: November 28, 1966 (age 59) Ōsaka, Japan
- Areas: Writing scripts, artist

Tamayo Akiyama (秋山 たまよ, Akiyama Tamayo; born November 28, 1966) is a Japanese shōjo manga author and artist.

== Career ==
Akiyama is a former member of CLAMP, having left the group on October 1, 1992.

Akiyama has also done illustrations for three novels (Kyokutō Shōnen and Komaranu mae no kami da nomi by Kobayashi Megumi and Watashi no Kare wa Hamster by Edō Kei) and illustrations for a CD (Psycho Sound Machine Drama by Ohara Mariko).

== Works ==
Year	Title	Volumes	Publisher
1989	Derayd (界境天秤の月) (original idea from Nanase Ohkawa of Clamp)	1	Shinkigensha
1990–2002	Cluster (クラスター)	7	Shinkigensha
1994–1995	Mouryou Kiden (魍魎姫伝)	3	Kadokawa Shoten
1996–1997	Hyper Rune (サイバー・プラネット1999 HYPER・ルン)	4	Kadokawa Shoten
1999	Secret Chaser (シークレットチェイサー)	2	Kadokawa Shoten
1999	Zyword (ガイオード)	1	Kadokawa Shoten
2000	Shade (-シェイド-)	1	Shueisha

Hyper Rune, Mouryou Kiden, Secret Chaser, and Zyword were published in North America by Tokyopop.

In CLAMP's early years, Akiyama worked on doujinshi in the BL genre. Her collaborative doujinshi works were released as CLAAMP Book on July 19, 1988.

== See also ==
- CLAMP
