= Kazusa Takashima =

Japanese manga artist

Kazusa Takashima (高嶋 上総, Takashima Kazusa; born October 23) is a Japanese manga artist, famous for her yaoi manga. After being a doujinshi artist from 1999 to 2000, she became an official manga artist in 2001. In addition to this, she has also illustrated a number of light novels.

== Biography ==
Born in Hokkaido on October 23, she began her career in 1999 as a Houshin Engi doujinshi artist as well as doing fanart from popular series like Hikaru no Go, Shaman King and Yami no Matsuei. Her works were predominantly BL-related.

Finally she got her break when her first original series, Harlem Beat wa Yoake Made was serialized in Kadokawa's Monthly Asuka. After a well received debut, the company decided to publish the series into an actual volume. After that, she went on to make another of her well-known series: Last Client which was serialized in Biblos's BexBoy Magazine in 2002. In that same year she got Wild Rock published by Biblos (it went straight to manga form; not serialized). Since then she has published roughly nine distinctive titles through various publishing companies and has been the illustrator of a number of light novels by various authors, and other media.

She filed a lawsuit against Kayono in 2004. The lawsuit was founded on Takashima's belief that Kayono had directly traced over her work Wild Rock, and used it for her own manga. The judge threw out the case (resulting in Takashima losing). Takashima decided to go on hiatus, leaving all of her series unfinished. She resumed work in 2007 with the fourth installment of Harlem Beat wa Yoake Made. Since then, she has finished the series, Wild Rock and Man's Best Friend have been reprinted, and she did a pinup of Chris (from her series Last Client, which had been left on hiatus) in Biblos's GOLD magazine. She also changed websites.

Takashima was more active on her blog in 2011, and in her December 10 entry, stated that she "took a break" that she felt was necessary and that she "plans to work hard" in the new year.

In 2013, she became the illustrator for Mirage of Blaze's prequel light novels by Kuwabara Mizuna, titled Mirage of Blaze: The Showa Era Chapters. The 11 Volumes finished publication in 2017, though her art was used for the promotional material for the stage play. This is the longest, single series light novel she's worked on thus far.

In 2014, she also revitalized her Cocolog Blog, but under a new name. Among the early posts on here, she lists, in great detail, all of her various works, including published manga, illustration contributions, and minor things like doujinshi, pinups, advertisements, one-shot stories, etc. up to the present (2014) and slightly beyond that with publication plans for the following year (2015). It seems even now she doesn't post regularly to her blog with months passing before a new post appears, but she does post with more regularity to Instagram.

She started an Instagram account in February 2016 where she posted various updates or notices about minor illustration work she was doing, or fan art and concept art. Larger resolution versions of all of the posts can be found on her previously mentioned Cocolog blog. In 2018, she seemed to finally end her hiatus with a new manga titled, Whiskers and Tails with Kannaduki. It is being serialized in Biblos's BexBoy Gold Magazine.

In June 2019, she made a post to her blog advertising the latest chapter of Whiskers and Tails, and mentioned that she'd been considering continuing one of her old works. This was exciting news for fans as several of her unfinished works (Last Client, Hakobunjaa, etc.) were very popular before her hiatus and their subsequent discontinuation. She gave no hints about which series she was considering bringing back, but sounded sure she would continue at least one of them.

== Major works ==
- Harlem Beat wa Yoake Made (2001–2008)
- Last Client (2002; discontinued in 2004)
- Wild Rock (2001–2002)
- Dragon X Boy (2003; discontinued after 1 chapter.)
- Takuhai Sentai: Hakobunja (2003; discontinued after 1 chapter.)
- Private Magician (2003; discontinued after 3 chapters.)
- Kingyo Hime (2003–2004; extra in Inu mo Arukeba manga.)
- Inu mo Arukeba: Fallin' Love (2004)
- Mata Natsu ga Kita & Pinpoint Lovers (2004; extra in Inu mo Arukeba manga.)
- Mirage of Blaze: The Showa Era Chapters (2014; illustrator)
- Whiskers and Tails with Kannaduki (2018-Present)
