= Man's Best Friend (manga) =

2006 Japanese manga

- The cover of Blu Manga's English edition, featuring new art.

犬も歩けばフォーリンラブ (Inu Mo Arukeba Fallin' Love)
- Genre: Yaoi
- Created by: Kazusa Takashima
- Manga
- Written by: Kazusa Takashima
- Published by: Biblos, Libre Publishing
- English publisher: NA: Blu Manga
- Magazine: Magazine Be × Boy
- Published: March 10, 2004

Man's Best Friend (known as Inu mo Arukeba Fallin' Love (犬も歩けばフォーリンラブ, If Dogs Can also Walk I'm Fallin' Love) aka the Inu mo Arukeba series) is an explicit yaoi manga by Kazusa Takashima, and is published in English by Blu Manga, a now-defunct boys' love publishing division of Tokyopop.

== Plot ==
The manga is split into three stories:

- The first three chapters are about Ukyo, who rescues a dog that he names Kuro. Kuro can talk and magically transform into a muscular human, and Kuro takes a romantic interest in Ukyo.
- The next two chapters (Mata, Natsu ga Kita (また、夏が来た, Summer Has Come Again) and Pinpoint Lovers) are about Kentaro and Kasumi, who reunite after a decade apart. Long ago, Kentaro had made a promise to wait ten years for Kasumi, but at the time he had thought that Kasumi was a girl.
- The last chapter (Kingyo Hime (金魚姫, Goldfish Princess)) is about a man, Keisuke, who rescues a magical goldfish from a group of children. Said goldfish then transforms into a man, thanking Keisuke.

== Publication ==
For the English release of Man's Best Friend, Blu Manga decided to replace the original cover art, which depicted Kuro reclining shirtless in a with a gun holster covering his crotch, with new cover art depicting Kuro tearing off Ukyo's shirt with his teeth. The new cover art was created from existing art within the volume.

No.	Original release date	Original ISBN	English release date	English ISBN
1	March 10, 2004	978-4-83-521564-8	June 13, 2006	978-1-59-816357-5

== Reception ==
The manga has been described as "reminiscent of Guru Guru Pon-chan." Kuro's dog-like characterization was praised by Sequential Tart. Library Journal described the stories as contrived and said that the characters "exist to have sex." Christopher Butcher regarded Man's Best Friend as being the "most unique" of Blu's releases, and as a "very creative" fetish. Dru Pagliassotti, comparing romance novels with Boys Love manga, mentions Man's Best Friend as an example of a kemonomimi "society", or setting.
