= The Betrayal Knows My Name =

Japanese manga series by Hotaru Odagiri

- First tankōbon volume cover

裏切りは僕の名前を知っている (Uragiri wa Boku no Namae o Shitteiru)
- Genre: Dark fantasy; Supernatural
- Manga
- Written by: Hotaru Odagiri
- Published by: Kadokawa Shoten
- English publisher: NA: Yen Press
- Magazine: Monthly Asuka
- Original run: September 24, 2005 – April 24, 2017
- Volumes: 13
- Anime television series
- Directed by: Katsushi Sakurabi
- Written by: Natsuko Takahashi
- Music by: Shōgo Kaida
- Studio: J.C.Staff
- Licensed by: NA: Funimation
- Original network: Chiba TV
- Original run: April 12, 2010 – September 20, 2010
- Episodes: 24
- Light novel
- Written by: Touko Fujitani
- Illustrated by: Mai Matsuura
- Published by: Kadokawa Shoten
- Imprint: Kadokawa Beans Bunko
- Original run: May 29, 2010 – September 30, 2010
- Volumes: 2
- icon

The Betrayal Knows My Name (Japanese: 裏切りは僕の名前を知っている, Hepburn: Uragiri wa Boku no Namae o Shitteiru) is a Japanese manga series written and illustrated by Hotaru Odagiri. It was serialized in Kadokawa Shoten's shōjo manga magazine Monthly Asuka between September 2005 and April 2017, with its chapters collected in 13 tankōbon volumes. A 24-episode anime televisions series adaptation was broadcast on Chiba TV from April to September 2010.

== Plot ==
Yuki Sakurai is a teenager with a mysterious ability. He was abandoned near the Asahi orphanage at birth. Because of this, he strives for independence. He hates being a burden to those around him, but he fears being abandoned. Ever since he can remember, he has had a strange empathic ability: when he touches others, he can feel their emotions and generate a powerful wave of pure yellow light that purifies everything in its path. Because of this ability, he is known as the "God's Light". Unable to control this ability, he has often made insensitive blunders in the past. Yuki eventually meets Zess, a mysterious stranger who saves his life. For some reason, Yuki feels like he has met this person before. As death draws near and his abilities grow stronger, Takashiro Giou, a man claiming to be Yuki's older brother, appears and reveals the truth about his past life.

== Characters ==
=== Main ===
Yuki Giou (祇王 夕月, Giō Yuki) / Sakurai (桜井)
Voiced by: Sōichirō Hoshi
Yuki is a high school freshman who bears Kami no Hikari (神の光; 'The Light of God'). Abandoned at birth by his mother, Mizuki, he grows up in Asahi Orphanage. Physical contact with those in emotional distress allows him to read their emotions and see their past, an ability that causes him great suffering. He feels an odd nostalgia for Zess and often relies on him. After moving to the Twilight Mansion, he becomes known as Giou Yuki. He is the most important member of the Giou Clan and is considered the master of the Zweilts. His special technique, Hallowed Wall, creates a protective yellow barrier, though it demands significant focus and mystical energy. Yuki possesses the ability to bear the pain and "sins" of others, healing fellow Zweilts by taking their injuries upon himself, often resulting in his collapse for days. Yuki has been reincarnated many times, with his current life being his first as a male.
Luka Crosszeria (ルカ=クロスゼリア, Ruka Kurosuzeria) / Zess (ゼス, Zesu)
Voiced by: Takahiro Sakurai
A Duras demon with silver eyes and black hair, Luka has protected Yuki from the shadows for 15 years. Though his true age is unknown, he appears as a college student. Reserved and indifferent, his demeanor softens only around Yuki. A descendant of the "sinner" clan Crosszeria, Luka is a powerful Opasts known as "Bloody Cross" for his unique red Brand Zess. He wields a large black sword capable of powerful magic and commands the dragon familiar Sodom. Once bound by a painful blood contract to the demon king, Luka abandoned that position after meeting Yuki. He now fights alongside the Giou Clan, considered a traitor by other Duras, and is completely devoted to Yuki.

=== Zweilt Guardian ===
Tsukumo Murasame (叢雨九十九, Murasame Tsukumo)
Voiced by: Jun Fukuyama
A bearer of Kami no Mimi (神の耳; 'God's Ears'), Hose is a high school boy and a Zweilt Guardian of the Giou Clan. His abilities include hearing the voices of people's hearts, sensing individuals, communicating with animals, and projecting his thoughts. In battle, he manifests a gun named Knell from his ring. Hose is deeply protective of his older sister, Toko, and the two are constant companions.
Toko Murasame (叢雨十瑚, Murasame Tōko)
Voiced by: Marina Inoue
Tsukumo's older sister, Yuki's relative and also a Zweilt guardian. Her ring produces a huge sword called Eon (Eternity). She attends the same high school as her brother, where their closeness make all the girls jealous of her. She is very fond of Yuki (whom she calls Yuki-chan), telling him that "He is a person who is too kind for his own good" and asking him to refer to her in a more close way (Tōko-chan) instead of calling her Tōko-san. She is the guardian that most interacts with Luka, and sometimes blushes when she is near him, because in her past life, Tōko had a lover who resembled Luka.
Hotsuma Renjou (蓮城焔椎真, Renjou Hotsuma)
Voiced by: Daisuke Ono
A bearer of Kami no Koe (神の声; 'God's Voice'), Hotsuma is a Zweilt guardian whose gift manifests as fire, which he controls with volatile results. His fiery abilities caused an incident in his youth, leading to profound isolation. He carries deep guilt over a scar his childhood friend, Shuusei, received while stopping a subsequent suicide attempt. Hotsuma's ring produces a curvy blade named Masterstroke. Initially distrustful of Yuki, he gradually forms a bond with him, finding his fiery emotions can be calmed in Yuki's presence.
Shūsei Usui (碓氷 愁生, Usui Shūsei)
Voiced by: Mamoru Miyano
A bearer of Kami no Me (神の目; 'God's Eyes'), Shuusei is a Zweilt guardian and Hotsuma's childhood friend. He assists the police with his sixth sense and fights using crystal balls for support and a pair of short swords named Kurai Kurou. Quiet and sensitive, Shuusei has a notably small appetite. He later disappears, feeling his purpose was fulfilled after Yuki helps Hotsuma overcome his fears. After being kidnapped by Ashley and falling into a deep sleep, Hotsuma uses his Kami no Koe to command Shuusei to live, reviving him.
Kuroto Hourai (蓬莱 黒刀, Hourai Kuroto)
Voiced by: Hiroshi Kamiya
A professional shogi prodigy, he is quiet and serious by nature. He commits fully to his decisions, even if it means leaving behind something he loves, such as his shogi career, which he discovered after being taken in by Senshirou's grandfather. Having lost his original partner in the previous war, he is now partnered with Senshirou and wields a black katana named Izanagi.
Senshirou Furuori (降織 千紫郎, Furuori Senshirou)
Voiced by: Satoshi Hino
A Zweilt-in-training and a klutz by nature, Senshirou decided to become a guardian after his grandfather was killed by the Opast Cadenza while protecting him and Kuroto. He is now Kuroto's second partner, and their bond has strengthened over time, with Senshirou eventually earning the Zweilt ring of Kuroto's fallen partner, Oboro. A college art student with a love for calligraphy, he fights using a large calligraphy brush to draw spells and wields a gigantic scythe called Death Scythe.

=== Giou Clan ===
Takashiro Giou (祇王 天白, Giou Takashiro)
Voiced by: Takehito Koyasu
Takashiro Giou is the head of the Giou clan, initially introduced as Yuki's half-brother. He has lived for over a thousand years, having performed a forbidden ritual to house a Duras within his body, which grants him rapid healing and exempts him from reincarnation. He possesses a red grimoire known as the Book of Solomon. Takashiro is responsible for the continual reincarnation of Yuki and the Zweilts to fight the war against Reiga, a former friend, believing victory requires significant sacrifices. The Duras within him is later revealed to be a fragment of King Lucifer.
Tachibana Giou (祇王 橘, Giou Tachibana)
Voiced by: Shinichiro Miki
Tachibana is the curator at the Twilight Mansion and a member of the Giou clan. He maintains an upbeat personality and is notably talkative. It is suggested he may be an Opast.
Isuzu Fujiwara (藤原 彌涼, Fujiwara Isuzu)
Voiced by: Ken Narita
Isuzu is the Giou's family doctor who works full time at the infirmary located at Twilight Mansion. Isuzu is known for passing out for various days from lack of sleep, which is caused by his sleepless and restless nights of researching the subject of Duras. His words and actions about treatment come out as perverted whether or not he is aware of it. He is fascinated by Duras and always wants to examine Luka.

=== Others ===
Kanata Wakamiya (若宮奏多, Wakamiya Kanata)
Voiced by: Akira Ishida
Kanata is a childhood friend of Yuki, having grown up with him in the same orphanage. He carries the "Book of Raziel" and frequently opposes Yuki's residence at the Twilight Mansion. Kanata is later revealed to be the human reincarnation of Giou Reiga. After a traumatic incident involving fire, he develops a hatred for humanity and desires its destruction, though he remains conflicted regarding Yuki. His memories and power as Reiga were sealed until his human body matured enough to withstand them.
Yuki Giou (ユキ(前世))
Voiced by: Yukana
A supremely powerful Zweilt, the female incarnation of Yuki fell deeply in love with the Duras Luka, an event that precipitated Luka's betrayal of the demon king. Described as stubborn and proud, her final wish was to be reborn as a male. Some interpret this reincarnation as a sign the conflict is concluding. According to Luka, she desires to forget the past, including the time spent with him. While her voice is occasionally heard by her male counterpart, she never fully appears, and her true intentions remain unknown.
Ibuki Shikibe (式部 為吹, Shikibe Ibuki)
Voiced by: Yuri Amano
Takashiro's talented secretary. Ibuki is also the sister of Tsubaki and Yuki's aunt on his mother's side.
Tsubaki Shikibe (式部 椿姫, ShikibeTsubaki)
Voiced by: Hōko Kuwashima
She is Ibuki's younger sister and one of Yuki's aunts on his mother's side. She was originally betrothed to Senshirou because of a family agreement. They agreed to break it when Senshirou got closer to Kuroto as an adult. She hates most men, with the exception of Yuki and Senshirou.
Fuyutoki Kureha (呉羽 冬解, Kureha Fuyutoki)
Voiced by: Kenji Hamada
The butler of the main residence of the Giou clan. Although he serves the entire residence and its guests, his greatest loyalty resides with Takashiro. He is the most aware of the suffering Takashiro continues to endure as the leader of the Giou clan. His admiration is palpable throughout the story, but he has openly admitted that Takashiro is the one he loves.
Aya Kureha (呉羽 綾, Kureha Aya)
Voiced by: Sayuri Yahagi
Although not much is yet revealed about Aya, Aya takes care of those in the Twilight Mansion. She is also the younger sister of Fuyutoki.
Katsumi Tooma (遠間 克己, Tooma Katsumi)
Voiced by: Nobuhiko Okamoto
Katsumi is a full time cook at "Twilight Mansion" and a world-class chef. He cares a lot about the diets of the residents of the mansion. He has chastised Isuzu for not eating well. He created tomato bread for Hotsuma
Masamune Shinmei (神命 正宗, Shinmei Masamune)
Voiced by: Shintarō Asanuma
He is a member of the Giou clan and is a necromancer in training.
Oboro
He was the past partner of Kuroto who was brutally killed by Cadenza. His silver is worn by Kuroto as a memento of how much he had meant to him. His abilities were unknown.
Sodom (ソドム, Sodomu)
Voiced by: Momoko Ishikawa
Luka's pet dragon who often serves as one of the series comic reliefs. He has a more larger and realistic appearance of a dragon when fighting, but is often shown in his chibi form which has a split resemblance to Pikachu from the Pokémon franchise. He can also transform into a large wolf; while in his human form, he has dark tan skin, possesses his dragon tail and wolf ears, and has the appearance of a young preteen.

=== Opasts ===
Ashley (アシュレイ, Ashurei)
Voiced by: Kana Ueda
She is an Opast who was responsible for the "Sleeping Beauty" syndrome and the abduction of male students. She likes good-looking teenage guys and has a legion of low-class duras that look like dolls at her command.
Elegy (エレジー, Erejī)
Voiced by: Junko Minagawa
Elegy is a General-class Opast who claims to be in love with Zess. Luka states that Elegy is male, though Elegy themself declares possession of both genders.
Cadenza (カデンツァ, Kadentsa)
Voiced by: Takaya Kuroda
He is a General class Opast who killed Kuroto's previous partner, but left Kuroto alive. After Kuroto was reincarnated and put into the custody of Senshirou's grandfather for Zweilt training, Cadenza returned to kill Kuroto. The old man died protecting Senshirou and Kuroto, who both now want Cadenza dead. He is also known as the "Master Killer" due to his reputation of turning on the person who summons him.
Luze (ルゼ, Ruze)
Voiced by: Shinnosuke Tachibana
He is Luka's younger fraternal twin brother, distinguished by his amethyst eyes and longer hair worn in a ponytail. As a half-Duras, he relates to Reiga Giou and resents Luka for his betrayal of the Duras and for further disgracing the Crosszeria Clan through his romance with the female Yuki.
Jekyll (ジキル, Jikiru) and Hyde (ハイド, Haido)
Identical twin brothers who fought as a coordinated team, Jekyll and Hyde were both killed in the same battle. After Jekyll's death, Elegy allowed Hyde to drink her blood. This act granted him a power boost, enabling him to create a copy of himself to fight alongside as if Jekyll were still present.

== Media ==
=== Manga ===
Written and illustrated by Hotaru Odagiri, The Betrayal Knows My Name was serialized in Kadokawa Shoten's shōjo manga magazine Monthly Asuka from September 24, 2005, to April 24, 2017. Kadokawa collected its chapters in 13 tankōbon volumes, released from July 21, 2006, to May 23, 2017.

At the 2010 San Diego Comic-Con, Yen Press announced it had licensed the manga for an English release in North America. The publisher released the first ten original Japanese volumes in five two-in-one omnibus editions from June 28, 2011, to February 26, 2013, and the remaining three volumes were released as the sixth, seventh, and eighth volumes from September 24, 2013, to April 10, 2018.

==== Volumes ====
| No. | Original release date | Original ISBN | English release date | English ISBN |
|---|---|---|---|---|
| 1 | July 21, 2006 | 978-4-04-853971-5 | June 28, 2011 | 978-0-316-11941-2 |
| 2 | May 23, 2007 | 978-4-04-854090-2 | June 28, 2011 | 978-0-316-11941-2 |
| 3 | November 21, 2007 | 978-4-04-854135-0 | December 13, 2011 | 978-0-316-11942-9 |
| 4 | June 20, 2008 | 978-4-04-854187-9 | December 13, 2011 | 978-0-316-11942-9 |
| 5 | January 23, 2009 | 978-4-04-854276-0 | April 24, 2012 | 978-0-316-11943-6 |
| 6 | August 22, 2009 | 978-4-04-854360-6 | April 24, 2012 | 978-0-316-11943-6 |
| 7 | March 19, 2010 | 978-4-04-854441-2 | August 21, 2012 | 978-0-316-21615-9 |
| 8 | October 21, 2010 | 978-4-04-854543-3 | August 21, 2012 | 978-0-316-21615-9 |
| 9 | September 17, 2011 | 978-4-04-854687-4 | February 26, 2013 | 978-0-316-23268-5 |
| 10 | June 21, 2012 | 978-4-04-120264-7 | February 26, 2013 | 978-0-316-23268-5 |
| 11 | October 24, 2012 | 978-4-04-120469-6 | September 24, 2013 | 978-0-316-24311-7 |
| 12 | August 26, 2016 | 978-4-04-104089-8 | July 18, 2017 | 978-0-31-643966-4 |
| 13 | May 23, 2017 | 978-4-04-105532-8 | April 10, 2018 | 978-1-97-530126-2 |

=== Drama CD ===
A drama CD was released in November 2007 by Kadokawa Shoten and a second CD followed shortly after. In May 2010, a third drama CD was released.

=== Anime ===
In July 2009, announcement was made that an anime adaption would be directed by Katsushi Sakurabi, written by Natsuko Takahashi, and produced by J.C.Staff. The series aired for 24 episodes on Chiba TV and other JAITS stations from April 12 to September 20, 2010. (Note: The series was listed as airing on Sunday at 12:00 a.m., which is effectively Monday at midnight JST.) Its episodes were collected on 12 DVDs released from June 25, 2010, to May 27, 2011. The first opening theme is "Uragiri no nai Sekai made" (裏切りのない世界まで; 'To a World Free of Betrayal') and the first ending theme is "Aoi Ito" (蒼い糸; 'Blue Thread'), both performed by Rayflower. The second opening theme is "Inishie" (イニシエ) and the second ending them is "Kizuna" (絆; 'Bond'), both performed again by Rayflower.

| No. | Title | Original release date | Ref. |
|---|---|---|---|
| 1 | "Time, Set in Motion"; Transliteration: "Toki, Ugokidasu" (Japanese: 刻、動き出す) | April 12, 2010 | |
Yuki Sakurai was abandoned by his biological mother and left in an orphanage, where he spent his childhood alone with other orphans. Now, as a high school student, Yuki has recently begun to have several mysterious dreams that leave him with a nostalgic feeling that he has seen it all before. In the evening he receives a letter from an unknown sender that leaves him worried by its contents. When he answers the cries for help of a fellow student, Yuki is almost hit by a truck but is saved by the quick actions taken by a mysterious silver-eyed man.
| 2 | "Eternal Investigation"; Transliteration: "Eikō no Shirabe" (Japanese: 永劫の調べ) | April 19, 2010 | |
Yuki meets a young man with long hair who introduces himself as Takashiro Giou, who claims to be his older brother and asks him to come with him to Tokyo. Yuki is initially confused by the sudden revelation and as a result (of the female Yuki accusing him of running away) causes his power to break the orphanages' windows. Later, he has a confrontation with Uzuki at school, and his powers almost goes berserk again. Frightened and confused at his growing powers, he runs away only to meet up with Zess who comforts him. As they begin walking, they are attacked by Duras or demons and are saved by Touko and Tsukumo, along with Takashiro who talks about the Giou Clan and how everyone of its members have special powers and that they need his power.
| 3 | "Walpurgis Night"; Transliteration: "Warupurugisu no Yoru" (Japanese: ワルプルギスの夜) | April 26, 2010 | |
Yuki is troubled after his meeting with Murasame Toko and Tsukumo and Giou Takashiro, head of a family with special powers known as the Giou Clan. Does Yuki belong with Takashiro or with the children of the orphanage? Zess kindly watches over the confused Yuki while agents of evil approach. Zess warns Yuki to remain at the orphanage on Walpurgis Night but that night two orphans go missing and Yuki is asked to help look for them.
| 4 | "Lost Days, White Future"; Transliteration: "Kaeranu Hibi Shiroki Ashita" (Japanese: 帰らぬ日々 白き明日) | May 3, 2010 | |
While searching for the missing orphans, Yuki receives a call from his classmate Uzuki and heads to school, where he finds someone unexpected. Worried for Yuki, Tsukumo uses his power to find him and heads to his rescue.
| 5 | "A New Encounter"; Transliteration: "Arata na Deai" (Japanese: 新たな出逢い) | May 10, 2010 | |
Having found his place among the Giou Clan, Yuki decides to travel to Tokyo with Luka and the Zweilt Guardians. On the way there, inexplicable feelings well up inside Yuki as Luka sleeps by his side. Meanwhile, the police bring a case thought to be the work of demons to Takashiro in Tokyo, and two new Zweilt Guardians await Yuki at the police station.
| 6 | "The Boundary Between Light and Despair"; Transliteration: "Hikari to Zetsubō no Sakaime" (Japanese: 光と絶望の境目) | May 17, 2010 | |
In Tokyo, Yuki and Luka wait for Takashiro as he makes a stop at a police station. A girl is attacked by a man whose identity is revealed to be nothing more than a golem, holding the girl hostage. The girl is then possessed by a Duras, who reveals her motive to about kill Yuki in exchange for being granted a wish. The Voice of God (a Zweilt Guardian) Hotsuma steps into the battlefield with his burning flame.
| 7 | "The Twilight Mansion"; Transliteration: "Tasogare Kan" (Japanese: 黄昏館) | May 24, 2010 | |
Yuki and the others finally make their arrival to the Twilight Mansion at dusk. Upon arrival they are greeted by Aya Kureha and Tachibana Giou, the steward and director of the mansion. Yuki is disturbed by the nostalgic feeling surrounding the mansion, almost as if he has seen it all before.
| 8 | "Brand Zess"; Transliteration: "Burando Zesu" (Japanese: ブランド・ゼス) | May 31, 2010 | |
After everyone had breakfast at the Twilight Mansion, Tachibana Giou leads Yuki along with the Zweilt Guardians to the Communal bath which happens to be occupied by Toko Murasame and Aya Kureha. Luka drives Yuki to school in the morning. Outside the school, Kanata Wakamiya attempts to persuade Yuki to return with him but is interrupted by Toko's and Tsukumo's arrival. After the talk with Kanata, Yuki starts to doubt his decision to join the Giou clan. However, Luka reassures him that he should follow whatever he believes in, but suddenly three Mid-villains attack and attempt to capture Yuki.
| 9 | "Scars"; Transliteration: "Kizuato" (Japanese: キズアト) | June 7, 2010 | |
Yuki sees the scar on Shusei's chest and asks Luka what things he is unable to heal. Luka responds "scars that come from friends". The others are worried about Shusei because he seems unwell. The police come to Takashiro with a missing person case: 8 high-school boys are missing. They seem to think it's tied into the Sleeping Beauty Syndrome. Later, Hotsuma walks Yuki home and flashes back to being picked on as a kid. The other kids find out he can set them on fire and despise him even more. Shusei is his only friend. In the present, Hotsuma finds out his parents have really abandoned him as they want their payment in exchange for him. Yuki runs to comfort him and sees his past. Angered, Hotsuma starts a fire. He flashes back to when he tried to kill himself with his fire, only for Shusei to hold him and convince him to stop. Now, Hotsuma is able to extinguish his fire before it really hurts him or Yuki. Meanwhile, Shusei accepts that he wasn't the one to help Hotsuma and disappears. Hotsuma desperately wants to find him.
| 10 | "Cry of Despair"; Transliteration: "Dōkoku" (Japanese: 慟哭) | June 14, 2010 | |
Takashiro orders the Zweilt not to look for Shusei as World's End is searching. Shusei wakes up in a strange place surrounded by the 8 missing high school boys. Ashley comes in and reveals herself to be behind the Sleeping Beauty Syndrome. She puts the infatuated girls into a fatal sleep to harvest the power of their emotions and keeps their desired boys for herself. The Zweilt find a video left for them asking for God's Light in exchange for Shusei's life. Meanwhile, Ashley tries to get information on the Zweilt out of Shusei, but puts him to sleep when he doesn't talk. Toko and Tsukumo go to the most recent girl's house to find any more clues on Shusei's disappearance. While Toko is inside, Tsukumo answers a call for help then is attacked by twin Opasts and nearly killed by Reiga.
| 11 | "That Which is Fleeting, Strong, and Precious"; Transliteration: "Hakanaku Tsuyoku Totoi Mono" (Japanese: 儚く強く尊いもの) | June 21, 2010 | |
With Yuki's help, Tsukumo wakes up long enough to warn the others of Reiga. Yuki, Luka, and Hotsuma set off to find Ashley and Shusei while Takashiro handles things at the mansion before catching up. The three enter Ashley's barrier, a suspicious amusement park where her stuffed dolls attack them. Luka takes care of them while Hotsuma and Yuki continue on. They run into Kanata, who tries to persuade Yuki to forget it and come back with him. Yuki declines and leaves Kanata. Hotsuma and Yuki finally reach Shusei, who appears to be lifeless.
| 12 | "To Be a "Pair""; Transliteration: ""Futari" to Iu Koto" (Japanese: "二人" ということ) | June 28, 2010 | |
Hotsuma fights Ashley, but can't keep up because of his injuries. Just as she's about to kill him, his shouts wake up Shusei who stabs Ashley. The two take her on with renewed strength from being back together. Just as they're about to kill her, the twin Opasts, Jekyll and Hyde, show up and turn the fight around in their favor. Luka arrives in time to kill Ashley and save them. Just as they're about to finish off Jekyll and Hyde, Reiga appears. Yuki recognizes him as Kanata.
| 13 | "Irony of Fate"; Transliteration: "Unmei no Hiniku" (Japanese: 運命の皮肉) | July 5, 2010 | |
Yuki is stunned at the appearance of his childhood friend, Kanata, as Reiga. While Yuki struggles to deny the fact that Reiga is trying to kill him, the others try to protect Yuki from harm. Shusei and Hotsuma defend against the Opast twins who recovered from their injuries due to Reiga's power. Meanwhile, Luka is distracted by Fenrir, the familiar beast of Reiga. Luka, Shusei, and Hotsuma all manage to defeat their respective foes and rush to Yuki's side as Reiga aims icicle daggers to kill him. Takashiro appears just in time to shield Yuki. Takashiro and Reiga both use their ancient books to summon powerful beasts which then engage in a furious battle. Takashiro notices that Reiga has not fully awakened and thus manages to overpower Reiga's summon beast, also injuring him in the process. As Takashiro readies himself to deal the finishing blow, Yuki stops him by pleading for Reiga to tell him that their past memories were not lies. Reiga leaves after cautioning Yuki not to trust all that Takashiro tells him.
| 14 | "The Name of Said Bonded Contract"; Transliteration: "Keiyaku to Iu Na no Kusari" (Japanese: 契約という名の鎖) | July 12, 2010 | |
After the end of the brief confrontation with Reiga, Yuki sleeps for two full days due to the shock he received at knowing that his childhood friend Kanata was in fact, Reiga. While the others worry about Yuki, he busies himself with house chores and helping around in the mansion in order to forget the pain of Kanata's betrayal. On the other hand, Shusei and Hotsuma reconcile with each other, promising that they wouldn't avoid the other again because of guilt while Tsukumo and Touko try to confront Luka about telling Yuki of his previous life. As Yuki mentioned that he would like to remember more about Luka, Tachibana approaches them and informs Yuki of Takashiro's request that Yuki visit the Kamakura residence to learn more about the past.
| 15 | "After Determination..."; Transliteration: "Ketsui, soshite..." (Japanese: 決意、そして…) | July 19, 2010 | |
Yuki is scheduled to leave for the Kamakura residence with only Luka and Tachibana. While the others want to accompany him, they finally acquiesce to Takashiro's order that only Yuki should go to the Giou main house. Senshiro, a Zweilt-in-training from the main family comes to pick up Yuki and his entourage, making a stop on the way to pick up his partner, Kuroto, a prodigy in shogi who decided to quit in order to focus on the battle. Arriving at the main house, Luka tells Yuki that he is unable to enter the residence as certain people wouldn't want him there due to him being a Duras. Yuki assures Luka that he is determined to know everything about his powers, the battle and also of his past life while Luka internally wonders if Yuki would feel differently after knowing about their past. At the entrance of Kamakura residence, Yuki was greeted by the butler of the Giou main house, Fuyutoki, who is the older brother of Aya, the one who manages the Twilight Mansion. Yuki was then shown to a room where Takashiro later enters after completing a purifying ritual.
| 16 | "Frozen Time"; Transliteration: "Touketsusareta Jikan" (Japanese: 凍結された時間) | July 26, 2010 | |
Takashiro invites Yuki to accompany him on a stroll through the gardens. Passing through a bamboo grove, Yuki feels a sense of nostalgia towards the place. When Takashiro winces in sudden pain, Yuki gets to know more about Takashiro's real self: Takashiro is harboring a Duras within himself, enabling him to heal his wounds and making him immortal and renewing his memories. Takashiro has actually lived for more than 1000 years and was present since the start of the battle. He proceeds to tells Yuki that he was not related by blood to Yuki and that it was a lie to gain Yuki's initial trust. The reincarnation of the Zweilt guardians are also due to Takashiro summoning their souls back into the world in order to participate in the battle. Receiving empathy and understanding from Yuki who assures Takashiro that he remains an important person to him even if they do not possess blood ties, Takashiro brings Yuki to a monument which is known as God's Stone, the source of the Giou family's powers. There, he explains the origins of Reiga who was born from a union between a Giou-clan mother and an Opast father, making him a forbidden child. Reiga's main intent is to destroy humans as he views them as not fit to live. Takashiro mentions that Reiga who was reincarnated as Kanata holds no memory of his past self before his awakening, assuring Yuki that the Kanata he has spent his childhood with is not a set up facade. Relieved, Yuki confronts Takashiro to reveal the event that causes Reiga to betray the Giou clan.
| 17 | "Sakura"; Transliteration: "Sakura" (Japanese: 桜) | August 2, 2010 | |
Takashiro recounts the events that took place 1000 years ago, during the Heian period. The Giou clan was a well-known family who directly served the court and was led by 4 high-ranking personages: Ario, Takashiro, Reiga and a girl named Yomi. Reiga was feared and shunned due to his mixed parentage but he was supported by both Takashiro and Yomi. They lived in relative peace until a summons came from the royal court for the Giou clan to exterminate some high-ranking demons that were accidentally summoned. Takashiro accepted the task and set off from the village, leaving Reiga and Yomi in-charge of defending the village. Before he left, however, he remarked that he would be back to witness the blossoming of the lone sakura tree (representing Reiga) which had not put forth flowers for a long time. The demon-exterminating task took Takashiro longer than he initially thought and as he rode back, he noticed a great fire devastating the village. Hearing from an injured villager that Reiga had disarmed the barrier that protects the village, allowing a horde of monsters to assault the place, he ran to Yomi's room but found her dead. He received the scar on his face as Reiga directed a beam of light while Takashiro attempted to rush to Yomi's side. As Takashiro questioned Reiga as to his motive for burning the village, Reiga remarks that "everything is already too late" before disappearing. Yuki, after learning of the event that ignited the battle, decides to continue participating in it to stop others from getting hurt. It is also revealed that Ibuki and Tsubaki are his aunts; them being his mother, Mizuki's younger sisters. Handing over a picture of Mizuki to Yuki, they reassure him that his birth was not meaningless as he is loved and wanted. It was unknown, however, why Mizuki withheld the name of her husband from her sisters, and also the reason Yuki was left at the orphanage.
| 18 | "A World Without You"; Transliteration: "Anata no Inai Sekai" (Japanese: あなたのいない世界) | August 9, 2010 | |
Yuki decides to visit Luka and is assigned Senshiro and Kuroto as his bodyguards by Takashiro. At Yuki's prompting, Kuroto reveals that he and Senshiro owe Luka a great debt. Meanwhile, Touko and Tsukumo secretly takes a train to the Kamakura mansion in order to check up on Yuki. While Yuki wanders around the compound outside the mansion searching for Luka, Luka encounters Elegy, a General-class Opast from his past, at a clearing within a forest. She tries to persuade Luka to return to the Duras' side but is rejected. A brief fight ensues with Luka easily disarming Elegy, most probably because she refuses to use her full strength. As he is about to deal the finishing blow, a figure appears before him: the female Yuki from the past. Luka is stunned to see her and lowers his guard, embracing her as she repeatedly tells him that she loves him. The figure proved to be an illusion when Tsukumo injures Elegy with a shot from his gun and both he and Touko run up to Luka to provide back-up. Elegy, outnumbered, retreats. On the other side of the forest, Yuki is rushed back to the mansion by Senshiro and Kuroto after they sensed Elegy while searching for Luka. Yuki, however, remains worried about Luka's whereabouts as he enters the safety of the mansion.
| 19 | "The Vengeful Pair"; Transliteration: "Fukushuu no Imashime no Pea" (Japanese: 復讐の戒めの手(ペア)) | August 16, 2010 | TBA |
Kuroto asks Yuki to play shogi with him, where Kuroto shares his past of how Senshiro becomes his second partner. Hotsuma and Shusei are summoned to the Kamakura residence.
| 20 | "Sin and Punishment and Promise"; Transliteration: "Tsumi to Bachi to Yakusoku to" (Japanese: 罪と罰と約束と) | August 23, 2010 | TBA |
Deeply concerned for his master Takashiro, Fuyutoki feels frustration with his inability to do anything but simply wait. Inspired by his words, Yuki disobeys Takashiro's orders and leaves the mansion to search for Luka. Meanwhile, Kuroto and Senshiro's nemesis Cadenza, who was summoned by Reiga, vigilantly watches for an opportunity to attack the Giou Clan. When Yuki emerges from the safety of the compound, Cadenza raises a barrier to trap him. Kuroto and Senshiro arrive in time to defend Yuki but are badly outclassed. Yuki raises a wall of defense around Kuroto, Senshiro and himself but starts to fail under repeated attacks from Cadenza. Reiga appears and deflects Cadenza's attack that would shatter Yuki's wall.
| 21 | "The Indelible Image"; Transliteration: "Kienu Omokage" (Japanese: 消えぬ面影) | August 30, 2010 | TBA |
Reiga commands Cadenza to retreat by invoking his summoner's right, enveloping Cadenza in chains, which Kuroto explains, will burn through him if he still refuses to obey Reiga's commands. Cadenza remarks slyly that since Reiga already has 2 General-Class Opasts under him, his powers are currently split, making him weaker. Breaking the chains easily, Cadenza turns on his master as befit his title "Master Killer" and they exchange blows. Reiga is overpowered soon enough but as Cadenza readies the finishing strike, Luka appears and blocks the attack, saving Reiga. Telling both Kuroto and Senshiro to escort Yuki back to the mansion, Luka promises Yuki that he will protect Reiga if that is Yuki's wish. As both Luka and Cadenza release their powers in preparation for a duel, the other Zweilts appear. Cadenza aims for a sneak attack at Yuki but is stopped by Reiga, yet again coming to Yuki's aid, surprising everyone. Yuki is even more assured that it is Kanata who wants to protect him and confronts Reiga. However, Reiga mentions that it was just his plan not to kill Yuki so early in the battle and reiterates the fact that Kanata is now gone. As Yuki continues to deny Reiga's words, Cadenza finally asks Reiga where his loyalties lie.
| 22 | "To the Final Battle..."; Transliteration: "Kessen he..." (Japanese: 決戦へ…) | September 6, 2010 | TBA |
Reiga and Cadenza retreat to Infernus, granting everyone a temporary reprieve from battle. Having pushed the limits of his power, Yuki loses consciousness and collapses. Witnessing the damage Yuki suffered in battle, the Zweilts gathered at the Kamakura mansion renew their promise to end the war. The doctor warns Tachibana and Luka that if Yuki uses his power again while he still lacks control, Yuki will die. While Yuki and Takashiro are bedridden, Elegy gives Hyde, the surviving Twin Opast, her blood to drink, enabling him to power up. Then the three Opasts attack the Kamakura residence. The Zweilts put up a fight. When Yuki tells Luka he intends to join the fight, Luka goes in his stead, leaving Sodom to guard Yuki. However, Yuki is unable to remain behind in safety and forces himself to go to the fight. As he summons his great abilities to help the Zweilts, Reiga arrives and abducts an unconscious Yuki. The three top Opasts leave as well, enraging Luka that he had failed to protect his beloved again.
| 23 | "The Battle of Traitors..."; Transliteration: "Uragiri no Tatakai" (Japanese: 裏切りの戦い) | September 13, 2010 | TBA |
Reiga kidnaps Yuki and uses him to lure Luka and the Zweilts into his territory. Takashiro discovers Reiga's whereabouts and sends Luka and the Zweilts to rescue him. Hyde is held back by Hotsuma and Shusei, Elegy is held back by Tsukumo and Touko, and Cadenza is held back by Kuroto and Senshiro, leaving Luka to confront Reiga and save Yuki. During the magical battle with Reiga, Luka is badly injured. Then Reiga blasts Yuki, intending to kill him, but Luze who addresses Luka as "older brother" arrives and stops the blast because his understanding was that Yuki is essential to their plans.
| 24 | "Connected Hearts"; Transliteration: "Kokoro o Tsunagu Mono" (Japanese: 心ヲツナグ者) | September 20, 2010 | TBA |
Reiga orders Luze, Luka's younger twin brother, to destroy everything that stands in their way, so Luze challenges Luka. During the fight of Luze and Luka, Takashiro breaks through Reiga's barrier and takes on Reiga, using the darkness within him (the Duras in his body) to put him on equal standing with Reiga. Yuki decides to summon his power to end the cycle and his power goes out of control. Reiga orders Luze to leave because when God's Light is unleashed, it dispels all darkness and can endanger a Duras' existence. Luze, Cadenza and Elegy flee God's Light while Hyde is destroyed, and the Zweilts' injuries are healed. Yuki is unable to stop his power, but Luka manages to save him. Luka, Takashiro and the Zweilts return to the Kamakura residence with Yuki. Takashiro says the prophetic ritual revealed no emergency, so it is assumed that there's no immediate threat from Reiga in the near future. Takashiro releases the Zweilts to live as they wish until the next battle.

=== Live-action ===
The August 2011 issue of Kadokawa Shoten's Asuka magazine announced that the manga would be adapted into a live-action stage production which will run in the Ginza district of Tokyo, from December 21–25. The cast included Genki Okawa as Yuki Giou (Sakurai), Ire Shiozaki as Zess (Luka Crosszeria), Masakazu Nemoto as Kanata Wakamiya/Reiga Giou, Yu Kariwa as Tsukumo Murasame, Sayaka Chinen as Toko Murasame, Bishin Kawasumi as Hotsuma Renjou, Yamamoto Ikkei as Shūsei Usui, Takafumi Miki as Takashiro Giou, and Tetsuya as Isuzu Fujiwara. The script of the play, staged in November 2012, was published by Kadokawa Shoten in a volume that includes an original UraBoku manga story.

== Reception ==
The fourth, fifth, and sixth volumes of the manga are best-sellers according to The New York Times.
