= Mad Love Chase =

Manga series

- Genre: action, comedy, supernatural
- Manga
- Written by: Takashima Kazusa
- Published by: Kadokawa Shoten
- English publisher: NA: TokyoPop
- Magazine: Asuka
- Original run: 2001 – 2008
- Volumes: 5

Mad Love Chase, known in Japan as Harlem Beat wa Yoake Made (Harlem Beatは夜明けまで, Harlem Beat Until Dawn), is a manga by Kazusa Takashima. In 2001, it began serialization in Asuka and the first volume was released in July 2002. In 2009, it was licensed by TokyoPop under the name Mad Love Chase, the subtitle of the series.

== Plot ==
A supernatural comedy about the Prince of Hell, Kaito, and his cat, Levun, who decide to run away together to escape an arranged marriage the Prince wants no part of. Somehow upon entering the human world, the Prince's appearances changes from tall, dark and handsome to short, light and skinny, and his cat becomes a tall, busty female. Now the Prince is living life as a regular high school student and his cat is the school's nurse. Meanwhile, the King of Hell sends a womanizing vampire, a short tempered werewolf, and a kind-hearted zombie to retrieve his son. Not to mention, the Prince's fiancée is not going to just wait around forever.

== Characters ==
Kaito (カイト) - The Prince of Hell: Tall, dark, and handsome in Hell, but an average, skinny kid (under the alias: Yamato Kujou (九条 ヤマト, Kujō Yamato)) in the human world. His best friend is the overprotective, Taiki Asakura. When under disguise, it appears that he can turn back to his original self involuntarily. However, this has only happened twice in the manga so far; when falling into the pond at the festival and when falling into the lake to rescue Levun. He can turn back to his human disguise when Levun kisses him. He has feelings for Levun as show in chapter 12. He has a distinctive, black tattoo on the whole of his back, which identifies him as the Prince of Hell.

Levun (レブン, Rebun) - The Prince's Cat: Kaito's cat in Hell, but a tall, beautiful, and busty female (under the alias: Itsumi Haga (羽賀 逸美, Haga Itsumi) or Haga-sensei/Ms. Haga) in the human world. She poses as the school nurse in Kaito's high school to keep an eye on him. It appears that she can kiss Kaito to turn him back to his human disguise. Like Kaito, she has involuntarily changed back to her form from Hell and changed back into her human disguise afterward without warning, but why this happens is still unknown. It looks as if she has a somewhat attraction to Kaito although this is probably because he is her master. Asakura Taiki and Souya (the vampire) have very obvious feelings for her. She seems to have special feelings for Taiki (it is hinted to be romantic).

Taiki Asakura (朝倉 太樹, Asakura Taiki) - The Zombie: He is best friends with Kaito and has a crush on Levun in her human form, Haga-sensei. Taiki is kind-hearted but muscled. He tries his best to protect Kaito from danger. He is sent by the King of Hell along with two others to find Kaito's whereabouts. Souya (the vampire) and Kisaragi Touma (the werewolf) believe that Kujou Yamato (Kaito) is in fact the Prince, but Taiki is reluctant to believe so.

Souya (蒼夜, Sōya) - The Vampire - Mr. Janitor: He is one of three lackeys sent by the King of Hell to find Kaito's whereabouts. He is a womanizer who also, like Taiki, has a crush on Levun's human form, Haga-sensei. He has failed to gain her affection more than a few times. He poses as a janitor at Kaito's high school and is popular with the school girls there.

Touma Kisaragi (如月 冬真, Kisaragi Tōma) - The werewolf: He is one of three lackeys sent by the King of Hell to find Kaito's whereabouts. He is short tempered, likes to nap, and skilled with knives. He poses as a senior in Kaito's high school. He is most often seen arguing with Souya (the vampire).

Sugita-sensei (杉田先生) - The Prince of Hell's Fiancé: Went to the human world off on her own to find Kaito's whereabouts. She poses as a new counselor at his high school and performs "uniform checks" without warning on unsuspecting students. She is looking for the black tattoo which identifies its owner as the Prince of Hell.

Mikage Kunitachi (国立 美景, Kunitachi Mikage): A underclassmen at Kaito's high school who has a crush on Taiki after an incident in the nurse's office. While Kaito was passed out in the nurses room after one of Sugita-sensei's "uniform checks", Taiki tries to sneak a peak at his back for the black tattoo. Instead, he mistakes Mikage for Kaito and feels her up. She misinterprets this incident and stops at nothing to gain "Asakura-senpai"'s affection, forever trying to remove Kaito from the picture.
