= Secret Chaser =

Japanese manga

シークレットチェイサー (Shiikurettocheisaa)
- Genre: Adventure, horror
- Manga
- Written by: Tamayo Akiyama
- English publisher: NA: Tokyopop
- Original run: 1999 – 1999
- Volumes: 2

Secret Chaser (Japanese: シークレットチェイサー, Hepburn: Shīkurettocheisā) is a Japanese manga is written and illustrated by Tamayo Akiyama. The manga is licensed for an English-language release in North America by Tokyopop, licensed for a French-language release in France.

== Reception ==
Mania.com's Jarred Pine criticises the manga for its lack of "mystery solving" and thinks that the "horror" genre for the book is mis-tagged. IGN's A.E. Sparrow commends the book for its art.
