= Broken Angels (manga) =

Shōjo manga series

壊れはじめた天使たち (Kowarehajimeta Tenshi Tachi)
- Genre: Fantasy, Romance, Supernatural
- Manga
- Written by: Setsuri Tsuzuki
- Published by: Kadokawa Shoten
- English publisher: NA: Tokyopop
- Magazine: Monthly Asuka
- Original run: January 1999 – September 2003
- Volumes: 5

Broken Angels (Japanese: 壊れはじめた天使たち, Hepburn: Kowarehajimeta Tenshi Tachi) is a 5 volume manga created by Setsuri Tsuzuki which began in Kadokawa Shoten's Monthly Asuka. The manga is licensed in English by Tokyopop.

== Plot ==
The story is about Fujiwara Sunao, a high school student often mistaken as a boy because of her dressing up like a boy. Sunao also has the ability to control and manipulate water at will. She appears to be the uncaring type of heroine but quickly befriends the crossdressing school nurse Mr. Shizuki and the perverted Kureha among many others. Sunao is a heroine that acts as a counselor to help people that have problems and saves them from themselves and their painful pasts.

== Characters ==
- Fujiwara Sunao: a High School freshman with the power to manipulate water. Her carefree, independent attitude and insistence on dressing like a boy make her a difficult student, yet she has a soft spot for those in need. She has a hidden, tragic past, and is secretly the daughter of Izumi, the previous head of the Takatou family.
- Ikushima Kureha: Sunao's classmate and a model student, Kureha harbors a wild streak and once attempted to set the school on fire. After being saved by Sunao, Kureha chose to vent her feelings in a more affectionate, if somewhat perverted, manner. She tends to hit on other girls (and a few boys here and there) with the same enthusiasm.
- Shizuki Kaguya: The infamous and eccentric nurse at Sunao's school. He knows of Sunao's powers and also used to be a member of the Takatou family, but left for unknown reasons. He acts flamboyant but loudly proclaims himself as 'normal' regardless.
- Hokage Minai: A quiet man who lives with Sunao and acts as her parental guardian, apparently because of his love for Sunao's mother, Izumi. Like Shizuki Kaguya, he was part of the Takatou family, but has cut ties with them.

== Reception ==
Erica Friedman of Yuricon commented in her review of the third volume that she did not consider it a yuri series, noting that "in this case the crossdressing, like any Yuri, is played entirely for titillation/service. The girls wear boy's clothing "for their own reasons" none of which are ever explained and their gender identity is never really established, or even considered. It's basically just "chicks in suits look cool." Which is absolutely fine, but not enough to make me keep reading the series. The broken angels' stories are far too much like a broken record for my taste."
