= Rampo =

Rampo may refer to:

- Edogawa Rampo, Japanese writer
- Rampo (a.k.a. The Mystery of Rampo), a 1994 Japanese film inspired by the works of Edogawa Rampo
- Rampó or Rampon, Count of Barcelona
