= Rampo Kitan: Game of Laplace =

Japanese anime television series

- Key visual for the anime featuring the main protagonists, Akechi (top left), Kobayashi (right), and Hashiba (bottom left).

乱歩奇譚 Game of Laplace
- Genre: Mystery, psychological
- Created by: Edogawa Ranpo
- Anime television series
- Directed by: Seiji Kishi
- Written by: Makoto Uezu
- Music by: Masaru Yokoyama
- Studio: Lerche
- Licensed by: Crunchyroll (Note: In North America through Crunchyroll, LLC (formerly Funimation).); AUS: Madman Entertainment
- Original network: Fuji TV, Kansai TV (Noitamina)
- English network: UK: Animax; US: Funimation
- Original run: July 2, 2015 – September 17, 2015
- Episodes: 11

Rampo Kitan: Game of Laplace (乱歩奇譚 Game of Laplace, Ranpo Kitan Gēmu Obu Rapurasu; lit. Strange Tales of Rampo: Game of Laplace) is a Japanese anime television series produced by Lerche, directed by Seiji Kishi, and written by Makoto Uezu. The series aired on Fuji TV's Noitamina programming block from July 2 to September 17, 2015. The anime is inspired by the works of author Edogawa Ranpo and commemorates the 50th anniversary of his death in 1965.

== Plot ==
The story begins at a middle school where the murder and dismemberment of a teacher has taken place. Kobayashi, a boy who goes to this school and the lead suspect in the case, meets the genius detective Akechi, who comes to the school to investigate. After being cleared of the crime, Kobayashi takes an interest in Akechi and, in spite of his friend Hashiba's worries, volunteers to be Akechi's assistant.

== Characters ==
Kogorō Akechi (アケチ コゴロウ, Akechi Kogorō)
Voiced by: Takahiro Sakurai (Japanese); Eric Vale (English)
A genius 17-year-old detective who solves abnormal crimes for fun. Despite his age, he is highly intelligent, to the point that he has been allowed to be absent from school in exchange for investigating cases. The government has given him a special license in order to capitalize on his special investigative skills. He is regularly seen taking aspirin and guzzling coffee drinks.
Kobayashi Yoshio (コバヤシ, Kobayashi)
Voiced by: Rie Takahashi (Japanese); Jill Harris (English)
A middle school boy who is often mistaken for a girl, he is blamed for dismembering his homeroom teacher. Much like Akechi, he is excited when he discovers that he can solve mysteries, and he's unfazed by morbid details of murder. Kobayashi asks to become Akechi's assistant if he can discover the real killer of his homeroom teacher.
Sōji Hashiba (ハシバ, Hashiba)
Voiced by: Daiki Yamashita (Japanese); Justin Briner (English)
A passionate boy who is best friends with Kobayashi. He is the heir to the rich Hashiba company and detests Akechi for being "cold hearted" at first. He is also against the idea of Kobayashi becoming Akechi's assistant and often looks out for Kobayashi. He is the class rep and is popular with girls. It is implied he has romantic feelings for Kobayashi.
Hanabishi (ハナビシ, Hanabishi)
Voiced by: Mai Nakahara (Japanese); Monica Rial (English)
The new homeroom teacher of Kobayashi and Hashiba. She's very cheerful in class and dresses up in a Lolita/cat-like style. Kobayashi notices cut marks on her wrists.
Keisuke Kagami (カガミ ケイスケ, Kagami Keisuke)
Voiced by: Katsuyuki Konishi (Japanese); J. Michael Tatum (English)
An investigator for the Tokyo Metropolitan Police Department. He was later revealed to be one of the Twenty Faces, for giving the killer of his sister's death a slow and grueling demise, as vengeance due to the law's failure.
Nakamura (ナカムラ, Nakamura)
Voiced by: Chō (Japanese); Mark Stoddard (English)
A perpetually stubbly police officer, friendly with Kagami.
Black Lizard (黒蜥蜴, Kuro Tokage)
Voiced by: Yoko Hikasa (Japanese); Mallorie Rodak (English)
An underworld figure with a fixation on Akechi.
Shadow-Man (影男, Kage Otoko)
Voiced by: Takehito Koyasu (Japanese); Sonny Strait (English)
A master of disguise. He's known as a "gentleman thief" and wanted by the police. He once befriended Kagami's little sister Tokiko. It is eventually revealed that he was stealing money in order to pay for an operation that saved the life of a girl named Sachiko who was terminally ill. Sachiko was later kidnapped, and Shadow-Man asked for Kobayashi's help to investigate her disappearance.
Minami (ミナミ, Minami)
Voiced by: Saki Fujita (Japanese); Jad Saxton (English)
The medical examiner who delivers the results of autopsies in frantic scenes of exposition. Her personality is revealed to be much more twisted due to an incident where her little brother, who was terminally ill, committed suicide in order to make it less painful for her, but the plan backfired and caused her to become one of the Twenty Faces.
Corpsey (死体君, Shitai-kun)
Voiced by: Kappei Yamaguchi (Japanese); Jerry Jewell (English)
The demonstration dummy that Minami uses to show causes of death. It is revealed that it was an inspiration from Minami's dead brother.
Tokiko Kagami (カガミ 時子, Kagami Tokiko)
Voiced by: Megumi Toyoguchi (Japanese); Brina Palencia (English)
Kagami's little sister. Kagami frequently receives calls from her on his cellphone. Later murdered as retaliation for her brother's involvement in her killer's prior arrest.
Nathan Namikoshi (ナミコシ, Namikoshi)
Voiced by: Jun Fukuyama (Japanese); Todd Haberkorn (English)
Akechi's junior high friend and the first Twenty Faces. He created the Dark Star after constant abuse from his father and school bullies.

== Media ==
=== Anime ===
The anime television series produced by Lerche, directed by Seiji Kishi, and written by Makoto Uezu premiered on Fuji TV's Noitamina programming block on July 2, 2015. The anime is licensed by AnimeLab in Australia and New Zealand and is being simulcast on their website as it airs in Japan. The opening theme is "Speed to Masatsu" (スピードと摩擦, Supīdo to Masatsu; lit. "Speed and Friction") by Amazarashi and the ending theme is "Mikazuki" (ミカヅキ; lit. "Crescent Moon") by Sayuri. The broadcast of the ninth episode was delayed one week due to a scheduling conflict with a sports program.

No.	Title	Original release date
1	"The Human Chair, (Note: The English translations of the short stories "The Human Chair" and "The Caterpillar" are included in Edogawa Rampo's short story collection Japanese Tales of Mystery and Imagination.) Part 1"; Transliteration: "Ningen Isu (Zenpen)" (Japanese: 人間椅子(前編))	July 2, 2015
Kobayashi wakes up in his homeroom only to discover his homeroom teacher's dismembered body. Being the only witness, and having been found holding the murder weapon, he is viewed as the primary suspect in the killing. Later, Kobayashi and Hashiba visit Akechi, where Kobayashi asks to be his assistant. Akechi agrees to accept Kobayashi as his assistant if Kobayashi can find the killer. At the end of the episode, Kobayashi and Hashiba learn that their homeroom teacher was a homicidal maniac who turned his victims' bodies into chairs. Kobayashi is arrested as a suspected accomplice after the police find murder weapons with his fingerprints on them.
2	"The Human Chair, Part 2"; Transliteration: "Ningen Isu (Kōhen)" (Japanese: 人間椅子(後編))	July 9, 2015
Kobayashi and Hashiba think about the logic behind the murder and conclude that the victims made into chairs had a romantic connection with the teacher. Kobayashi is cleared of suspicion when he points out that his fingerprints were only on the murder weapons and not the entire crime scene, which suggests that he was framed. Using these connections and a planted false clue, Kobayashi deduces that the murderer is a classmate named Hoshino, who explains that she had feelings for her teacher, but murdered him when he fell out of love with her and revealed he had feelings for Kobayashi instead. The case solved, Akechi takes Kobayashi on as his assistant.
3	"Shadow-Man"; Transliteration: "Kage Otoko" (Japanese: 影男)	July 16, 2015
Akechi's next case is to capture a man who wears a bag on his head known as Shadow-Man, a thief who is accused of kidnapping several girls. Shadow-Man is revealed to be the benefactor of one of the missing girls, Sachiko; he stole in order to pay for Sachiko's medical treatment. Working with Shadow-Man to draw out the real kidnapper, Kobayashi disguises himself as a girl and gets kidnapped himself. It is revealed that the kidnapper is a fat man named Watanuki, who murdered several of the missing girls by encasing them in concrete; those he did not kill, he kept as members of his "family." Akechi and officer Kagami arrive on the scene to arrest him.
4	"Twenty Faces (Note: The English translation of the juvenile novel The Fiend with Twenty Faces was published by Kurodahan Press in 2012.)"; Transliteration: "Nijū Mensō" (Japanese: 二十面相)	July 23, 2015
Akechi is tasked with capturing a vigilante called Twenty Faces, who kills murderers who have not been brought to justice, finishing them in the same way they killed their victims. Akechi orders child-killer Watanuki to be released from prison as bait for Twenty Faces. Just when Twenty Faces is about to kill Watanuki, Akechi arrives to arrest him and reveals his identity to be Kagami.
5	"The Caterpillar"; Transliteration: "Imomushi" (Japanese: 芋虫)	July 30, 2015
Kagami tells his story about how he became the latest Twenty Faces. He once lived with his younger sister Tokiko that he cared for, but he would often come home late. He arrested a serial murderer named Sunaga, but Sunaga pleaded insanity and was admitted to a psychiatric clinic instead of being sent to prison. One day, Sunaga escaped the clinic and took revenge on Kagami by murdering Tokiko. Feeling betrayed by the law, Kagami took it upon himself to personally punish criminals who were not punished by the justice system, using the name and mask of a previous vigilante called Twenty Faces. Despite being arrested, he warns that Twenty Faces will live on. Elsewhere, the father of one of Watanuki's victims stabs him to death wearing the Twenty Faces mask.
6	"A Glimpse into Hell"; Transliteration: "Jigoku Fūkei" (Japanese: 地獄風景)	August 6, 2015
A cat, a bomb, a baby, and some extremists all turn up at Akechi's front door. With only 50 minutes to figure out what's going on, he has to disarm the bomb, find the baby's mother, and get rid of the cat (as he seems to fear cats).
7	"Strange Tale of Panorama Island, (Note: The English translation of the novella Strange Tale of Panorama Island was published by University of Hawaii Press in 2013.) Part 1"; Transliteration: "Panorama-tō Kitan (Zenpen)" (Japanese: パノラマ島綺譚(前編))	August 13, 2015
Examining the timing and methods of all the murders credited to Twenty Faces, Akechi and Kobayashi determine that Kagami was the third person to act as the infamous vigilante. Akechi receives a challenge suggesting that the fourth Twenty Faces is ready to strike.
8	"Strange Tale of Panorama Island, Part 2"; Transliteration: "Panorama-tō Kitan (Kōhen)" (Japanese: パノラマ島綺譚(後編))	August 20, 2015
Two leaders involved with the construction of an amusement park have been found crushed to death by large mannequins. Akechi figures out that the deaths were caused by flimsy metal gears; those gears were ordered by Chiyoko, one of the park's engineers, to avenge her friend's death as a result of brutal working conditions. After returning to Akechi's home, Akechi tells Kobayashi and Hashiba that he is determined to capture all of the Twenty Faces because his close friend Namikoshi started the phenomenon.
9	"Terrifying Mistake"; Transliteration: "Osoroshiki Sakugo" (Japanese: 恐ろしき錯誤)	September 3, 2015
Akechi gets a phone call from the next Twenty Faces. The target is the medical doctor Munakata and the fifth Twenty Faces is revealed to be Minami, whose brother was killed by him. Minami contaminated the food at an assembly Munakata was speaking at with the same chemical that killed her brother, though Akechi had replaced the food beforehand. However, Minami was just a diversion as Namikoshi, who Akechi believed to be dead, is the mastermind of the operation. Munakata is killed by a falling chandelier, thus leading to a crushing defeat for Akechi.
10	"A Desire for Transformation (Note: The English translations of the essay "A Desire for Transformation" and the short story "The Daydream" are included in Edogawa Rampo's short-story and essay collection The Edogawa Rampo Reader.)"; Transliteration: "Henshin Ganbō" (Japanese: 変身願望)	September 10, 2015
Namikoshi kidnaps Kobayashi and brings him to the Shinjuku Tower. There, he explains his background to Kobayashi. He was bullied by other kids and abused by his parents and teachers leading to his distrust of adults. Thus, he took the initiative to bring his abusers to justice by having them killed through a series of accidents he orchestrated. Back in the present, Namikoshi has gathered his team of Twenty Faces at the tower with the intent to die, while Twenty Faces sympathizers riot in the streets.
11	"The Daydream"; Transliteration: "Hakuchūmu" (Japanese: 白昼夢)	September 17, 2015
Namikoshi puts his plan into motion as the Twenty Faces who have gathered at the Shinjuku Tower begin falling to their deaths in five-minute intervals with the media broadcasting the incident across the country. As Akechi makes his way to the tower, he is impeded by Twenty Faces sympathizer. Shadow-Man arrives to keep the sympathizers occupied while Hashiba arrives on a motorcycle to escort Akechi to the tower. At the tower, Namikoshi agrees to end the fallings and instead, he and Kobayashi fall with Akechi saving Namikoshi while Hashiba saves Kobayashi. However, Namikoshi willingly lets go of Akechi's hand to fall to his death. Some time later, a new case arrives for Akechi.

== See also ==
- Kogoro Akechi
