= Ningen Isu =

Japanese metal band

- Origin: Hirosaki, Japan
- Genres: Heavy metal; doom metal; progressive rock
- Years active: 1987–present
- Labels: Meldac; Tokuma Japan Communications
- Members: Shinji Wajima; Ken-ichi Suzuki; Nobu Nakajima
- Past members: Noriyoshi Kamidate; Masuhiro Goto; Iwao Tsuchiya
- Website: ningen-isu.com

Ningen Isu (Japanese: 人間椅子, Hepburn: Ningen Isu; lit. 'The Human Chair') is a Japanese heavy metal band formed in Hirosaki in 1987. The band's current line-up consists of co-founders Shinji Wajima (guitar, vocals) and Ken-ichi Suzuki (bass, vocals) alongside Nobu Nakajima (drums, vocals), who joined in 2004. All three members contribute to the songwriting process. They have been noted for their stage personas, with Wajima dressing as a Meiji-era literary master, Suzuki dressing as a Buddhist monk, and Nakajima dressing as a Yakuza-style gangster.

== History ==
Both natives of Hirosaki, Wajima and Suzuki first became acquainted while attending a concert at the local music venue. They eventually became close friends in 1981, when they both entered Hirosaki High School. Their friendship would further develop through frequent exchanges of music records. It was around this time that Suzuki first exposed Wajima to the music of his favorite bands Kiss, Saxon, and Judas Priest, while Wajima shared his love of the Beatles, King Crimson, Deep Purple, and Led Zeppelin. Suzuki was impressed by Wajima's talent for songwriting and wrote a song called "Demon", while Wajima wrote a song called "Apocalypse of Iron Grill", which was not received well by the local music venue but which Suzuki liked nonetheless. Two years later, Wajima and Suzuki joined the band Shine Shine Dan ("Dead Dead Group"), a band formed by members of the local music venue, with whom they played at music festivals.

In 1985, after enrolling at different universities—Wajima studied Buddhism at Komazawa University, while Suzuki studied Russian literature at Sophia University—they formed a hard rock band and settled on the name Ningen Isu in 1987 when drummer Noriyoshi Kamidate joined the band, taking the name from the 1924 short story of the same name by Edogawa Rampo. They first gained public attention in 1989 through a performance of their song "Injū" ("Beast in the Shadows") on Ikasu Band Tengoku (Cool Band Heaven), a new television music competition on Tokyo Broadcasting System Television. Their uniquely heavy sound, technical skill, and lyrics full of literary references took the judges by surprise.

In 1990, they released their first album Ningen Shikkaku, followed two years later by Ōgon no Yoake, after which Kamidate left the band. They kept their heavy sound and lyrics referencing literature. Drummer Masuhiro Goto would support the recording of their fourth album Rashōmon in 1993. In 1995 and 1996, Iwao Tsuchiya served as the band's drummer but was replaced by Goto as a permanent member until leaving in 2003. In 2004, current drummer Nobu Nakajima joined the band. Wajima, Suzuki, and Nakajima once lived in a neighborhood in the district Koenji, Tokyo, which is famous for its subculture, music and free atmosphere.

During the mid-2010s, Ningen Isu saw a significant increase in popularity. They previously spent years in relative obscurity outside of Japan, and the sales of their albums did not go well. The band played at the Ozzfest 2013, hosted by Ozzy Osbourne, which they as Black Sabbath fans felt honored by. In 2019, their record Shin Seinen reached rank 14 in the Oricon music charts, their highest chart position to date. They released the video for their song "Heartless Scat" on YouTube in May 2019, and it has since gained to over 16 million views.

The band performed their first world tour in Berlin, Bochum, and London in February 2020.

== Musical style ==
The band's lyrics often reference Japanese classical literature, including authors Edogawa Rampo, Dazai Osamu, Akutagawa Ryunosuke, Jun'ichirō Tanizaki, and Mishima Yukio, in addition to authors in other languages such as Edgar Allan Poe, H. P. Lovecraft, Friedrich Nietzsche, and Georges Bataille. They often address topics such as Hell, Buddhism, the universe, samurai culture, and gambling. Wajima and Suzuki have a local accent called the "Tsugaru dialect", which adds a unique and heavy atmosphere and rhythm to their songs. They, especially Wajima, often use difficult and old Japanese (words used in Edo period to Showa period, often hard to understand even for Japanese people). They often wear kimono and traditional fundoshi underwear on stage.

== Influences ==
Ningen Isu was strongly influenced by Black Sabbath. Other influences include UFO, Led Zeppelin, Kiss, Budgie, King Crimson, and similar artists. The style of Wajima's guitar playing is influenced by Robert Fripp, Tony Iommi, Jimmy Page, Ace Frehley, Michael Schenker, and Tsugaru-jamisen. Suzuki is inspired mostly by Kiss and paints his face white while moving in a style similar to Kiss bassist Gene Simmons.

== Members ==
=== Current ===
- Shinji Wajima / Wazzy (和嶋慎治; born 25 December 1965) – guitars, vocals, theremin, main lyrics, composer (1987–present). His costume has motifs of a literary master from the Meiji era. His main influences are the Beatles, blues, and enka. He often uses original effects he makes himself. He sometimes uses a theremin, which adds a cosmic mood. He loves Rakugo.
- Ken-ichi Suzuki / Suzuken (鈴木研一; born 11 March 1966) – bass, vocals, lyrics, composer (1987–present). Sporting a shaved head and a painted white face, he dresses like a Buddhist monk. He notably wears fundoshi, old-style Japanese underwear, beneath his kimono. In the band's early days, Suzuki often wore clothes inspired by Nezumi-otoko, a rat-man character from Ge-Ge-Ge no Kitaro.
- Nobu Nakajima / Nobu (ナカジマノブ; real name Yoshinobu Nakajima (中島慶信); born 20 September 1966) – drums, vocals, composer (2004–present). He wears a koikuchi shirt and sunglasses, taking his look from old-school Yakuza. He sometimes uses Dora, a kind of Japanese gong. His hard and energetic drumming style earned him the nickname "Aniki" ("big brother"). He is a big fan of Hideshi Hino and a collector of sneakers, dam cards, and comic books.

=== Former ===
- Noriyoshi Kamidate (上館徳芳; born 14 June 1962) – drums (1987–1992). He was influenced by Cozy Powell and used very restrained moves to match Suzuki's basslines.
- Masuhiro Goto (後藤マスヒロ; real name 後藤升宏; born 29 August 1965) – drums, vocals (1993–1995 as a supporting member; 1996–2003 as a full member). His drumming was more dynamic and nuanced, heavily contributing to Ningen Isu's sound during his tenure in the band. He played on five albums and even wrote and sang lead vocals on some.
- Iwao Tsuchiya (土屋厳) – drums, vocals (1995–1996). He participated in two albums during his tenure, and even wrote and sang part of "Sanjussai" (三十歳) from the album Odoru Issunboushi (踊る一寸法師).

Timeline

== Discography ==
=== Albums ===
==== Original albums ====
Year	Album details	Chart
1989	Ningen Isu (人間椅子; The Human Chair): 1. Jinmen-sou (人面瘡; Human-Faced Carbuncle); 2. Injuu (陰獣; Beast In The Shadows); 3. Ringo no Namida (りんごの泪; Apple's Tears); 4. Ryouki ga Machi ni Yatte Kuru (猟奇が街にやって来る; Bizarre Hunter Come to Town); 5. Shinkei-shou I LOVE YOU (神経症 I LOVE YOU; Neurosis I LOVE YOU); 6. Ningen Shikkaku (人間失格; No Longer Human); 7. Sakura no Mori no Mankai no Shita (桜の森の満開の下; In the Forest, Under Cherries in Full Bloom)	
1990	Ningen Shikkaku (人間失格; No Longer Human): 1. Tetsugoushi Mokushi-roku (鉄格子黙示録; Apocalypse of Iron Grill); 2. Hari no Yama (針の山; Hell's Mountain Of Needles); 3. Ayakashi no Tsuzumi (あやかしの鼓; Ghost Drums); 4. Ringo no Namida (りんごの泪; Apple's Tears); 5. Sai no Kawara (賽の河原; The Children's Limbo); 6. Tengoku ni Musubu Koi (天国に結ぶ恋; Love Connected to Heaven); 7. Akuma no Temari-uta (悪魔の手毬歌; Temari-uta of Demon); 8. Ningen Shikkaku (人間失格; No Longer Human); 9. Heavy Metal no Gyakushuu (ヘヴィ・メタルの逆襲; Counter of Heavy Metal); 10. Arnheim no Izumi (アルンハイムの泉; Spring of Arnheim); 11. Sakura no Mori no Mankai no Shita (桜の森の満開の下; In the Forest, Under Cherries in Full Bloom)	31
1991	Sakura no Mori no Mankai no Shita (桜の森の満開の下; In the Forest, Under Cherries in Full Bloom): 1. Bakudan Koushin-kyoku (爆弾行進曲; Bomb March); 2. Yuigon-jou Housou (遺言状放送; Testament Broadcasting); 3. Kokoro no Kaji (心の火事; Fires of the Heart); 4. Yuuutsu Jidai (憂鬱時代; Melancholic Era); 5. Yashaga-ike (夜叉ヶ池; Pond of Yaksha); 6. Tokyo Bondage (東京ボンデージ); 7. Nusutto Sanka (盗人讃歌; Thief Hymn); 8. Sumo no Uta (相撲の唄; Song of Sumo); 9. Koujou-sen Jou no Maria (甲状腺上のマリア; Mary on the Thyroid Gland); 10. Taiyou Kokuten (太陽黒点; Sunspot)	57
1992	Ougon no Yoake (黄金の夜明け; Golden Dawn): 1. Ougon no Yoake (黄金の夜明け; Golden Dawn); 2. Dokusaisha Saigo no Yume (独裁者最後の夢; Dictator's Last Dream); 3. Heisei Asaborake (平成朝ぼらけ; Dawn of the Heisei Period); 4. Wa, Gan de Nebega (わ、ガンでねべが; I Have Cancer, Don't I?); 5. Suibotsu Toshi (水没都市; Submerged City); 6. Koufuku no Neji (幸福のねじ; Happy Screw); 7. Mandragora no Hana (マンドラゴラの花; Flower of Mandragora); 8. Subarashiki Nichiyoubi (素晴らしき日曜日; Wonderful Sunday); 9. Shinpan no Hi (審判の日; Judgment Day); 10. Mugon Denwa (無言電話; The Silent Phone Call); 11. Kyouki Sanmyaku (狂気山脈; At the Mountains of Madness)	
1993	Rashōmon (羅生門): 1. Motto Hikari wo! (もっと光を！; More Light!); 2. Ningen Isu Club (人間椅子倶楽部); 3. Namake-mono no Jinsei (なまけ者の人生; A Life of the Idler); 4. Shide-mushi no Uta (埋葬蟲の唄; Sexton, Sexton, on the Wall); 5. Aomori Rock Daijin (青森ロック大臣; Rock Minister in Aomori); 6. Nanya-doyara (ナニャドヤラ); 7. Braun-kan no Hanayome (ブラウン管の花嫁; CRT's bride); 8. Akogare no Arirang (憧れのアリラン; Longing Arirang); 9. Rashōmon (羅生門)	
1995	Odoru Issunboushi (踊る一寸法師; Dancing One-Inch Preacher): 1. Mothra (モスラ); 2. Kurai Nichiyoubi (暗い日曜日; Gloomy Sunday); 3. Dodarebachi (どだればち); 4. Girigiri Highway (ギリギリ・ハイウェイ; Barely Highway); 5. Eizuru-koto naki Shiromono (エイズルコトナキシロモノ; The Fellow That Never Come Insight); 6. Hanemono Jinsei (羽根物人生; Life Without Hits); 7. Sanjussai (三十歳; 30 Years Old); 8. Jikan wo Tometa Otoko (時間を止めた男; The Man Who Stopped Time); 9. Dynamite (ダイナマイト); 10. Odoru Issunboushi (踊る一寸法師; Dancing One-Inch Preacher)	
1996	Mugen no Juunin (無限の住人; Blade of the Immortal): 1. Sarashi Kubi (晒し首; Severed Head); 2. Mugen no Juunin (無限の住人; Blade Of The Immortal); 3. Jigoku (地獄; Inferno); 4. Bankara Ichidaiki (蛮カラ一代記; Stalwart Man Chronicle); 5. Bacchus Gurui (莫迦酔狂ひ; Bacchus's Madness); 6. Mokko no Komori-uta (もっこの子守唄; Cradlesong of Monster); 7. Katana to Saya (刀と鞘; Sword and Sheath); 8. Tsujigiri Kouta Musyuku-hen (辻斬り小唄無宿編; Street Murder Song of Outlaw); 9. Uchuu Yuuei (宇宙遊泳; Spacewalk); 10. Kuroneko (黒猫; Black Cat)	
1998	Taihai Geijutsu Ten (頽廃芸術展; Degenerate Art Exhibition): 1. Tainai-meguri (胎内巡り; Touring in the Womb); 2. Senritsu suru Kodama (戦慄する木魂; Shivering Spirit); 3. Kusouzu no Scat (九相図のスキャット; Scat of Rotting Cadaver); 4. Chinurareta Hina-matsuri (血塗られたひな祭り; Bloody Doll's Day); 5. Kiku-ningyou no Noroi (菊人形の呪い; Curse of Chrysanthemum Doll); 6. Tentai Shikou-shou (天体嗜好症; The Morbid Palatability to Astronomy); 7. Mura no Hazure de Big Bang (村の外れでビッグバン; Big Bang in Village Side); 8. ED75; 9. Excite (エキサイト); 10. Ahen-kutsu no Otoko (阿片窟の男; Man in the Opium Den); 11. Ginga Tetsudou 777 (銀河鉄道777; Galaxy Express 777); 12. Dunwich no Kai (ダンウィッチの怪; The Dunwich Horror)	
1999	Nijusseiki Sousoukyoku (二十世紀葬送曲; Requiem for the 20th Century): 1. Yuurei Ressha (幽霊列車; Ghost Train); 2. Mushi (蟲; Bug); 3. Koi wa Sankaku-mokuba no Ue de (恋は三角木馬の上で; Love on Wooden horse); 4. Tokai no Douwa (都会の童話; Fairytale of Urban); 5. Akatsuki no Dantou-dai (暁の断頭台; Guillotine at Dawn); 6. Shoujo Jigoku (少女地獄; Girl Hell); 7. Haru no Umi (春の海; Spring Sea); 8. Fumin-shou Blues (不眠症ブルース; Insomnia Blues); 9. Sabbath Thrash Sabbath (サバス・スラッシュ・サバス); 10. Kuroi Taiyou (黒い太陽; Black Sun)	
2000	Kaijin Nijuu Mensou (怪人二十面相; The Fiend with Twenty Faces): 1. Kaijin Nijuu Mensou (怪人二十面相; The Fiend With Twenty Faces); 2. Minashigo no Shuffle (みなしごのシャッフル; Shuffle of Orphan); 3. Hiruta Hakase no Hatsumei (蛭田博士の発明; Dr. Hiruta's Invention); 4. Keimusho wa Ippai (刑務所はいっぱい; Prison is Full); 5. Ashinaga-gumo(あしながぐも; Tetragnatha); 6. Amairo no Scarf (亜麻色のスカーフ; Flax Color Scarf); 7. Imomushi (芋虫; The Caterpillar); 8. Meitantei Toujou (名探偵登場; Appearance of Great Detective); 9. Yaneura no Neputa Matsuri (屋根裏のねぷた祭り; Neputa Festival in Attic); 10. Tanoshii Natsu-yasumi (楽しい夏休み; Merry Summer Vacation); 11. Jigoku Fuukei (地獄風景; Hell View); 12. Daidan-en(大団円; Grand Finale)	
2001	Mishiranu Sekai (見知らぬ世界; Unknown World): 1. Shinigami no Kyouen (死神の饗宴; Feast Of The Reaper); 2. Nehan Zakura (涅槃桜; Cherry Blossoms of Nirvana); 3. Shinryaku-sha (Invader) (侵略者（インベーダー）); 4. Sayonara no Mukou-gawa (さよならの向こう側; Beyond the Goodbye); 5. Hitokui Sensha (人喰い戦車; Man-Eating Tank); 6. Soshite Subarashiki Jikan-ryokou(そして素晴しき時間旅行; And Wonderful Time Trip); 7. Amai Kotoba Warui Nakama (甘い言葉 悪い仲間; Candied Words and Bad Buddy); 8. Shizen-ji (自然児; Child of Nature); 9. Eden no Shoujo (エデンの少女; Eden's Girl); 10. Miwaku no Ojou-sama (魅惑のお嬢様; Alluring Lady); 11. Akuma Ooini Warau (悪魔大いに笑う; Devil Laughs); 12. Kan-oke Rock (棺桶ロック; Coffin Rock); 13. Mishiranu Sekai (見知らぬ世界; Unknown World)	
2003	Shura bayashi (修羅囃子; The Band of Pandemonium): 1. Touyou no Majo (東洋の魔女; Oriental Witch); 2. Oni (鬼); 3. Ai no Kotoba wo Kazoe-you (愛の言葉を数えよう; Let's Count the Words of Love); 4. Tsuki ni Samayou (月に彷徨う; Misled by the Moon); 5. Yakyuu Yarou (野球野郎; Baseball Dude); 6. Saigo no Bansan (最後の晩餐; Last Supper); 7. Owaranai Ensou-kai (終わらない演奏会; Endless Concert); 8. Ou-sama no Mimi Wa Roba no Mimi (王様の耳はロバの耳; The King has Donkey Ears); 9. Osore-zan (恐山; Mount Osore); 10. Jasei no In (蛇性の淫; Snake-Like Horny); 11. Soukoku no Ie (相剋の家; House Of Conflict)	140
2004	San-aku Douchuu Hizakurige (三悪道中膝栗毛; Journey Through Three Evil Paths): 1. Senrei (洗礼; Baptisma); 2. Notare-jini (野垂れ死に; Dying by the Roadside); 3. Ishu-gaeshi (意趣返し; Vendetta); 4. Doutei (道程; Journey); 5. Yotarou Seiden (与太郎正伝; Yotarou's Authentic Biography); 6. Akuryou (悪霊; Evil Spirits); 7. Shinsei (新生; Born Again); 8. Yakan Hikou (夜間飛行; Night Flight); 9. Noresore (のれそれ; To the Max); 10. Hassha (発射; Discharge); 11. Chijin no Ai (痴人の愛; Fool's Love)	—
2006	Fu-chi-ku (瘋痴狂; Hoochie Koo): 1. Raijin (雷神; God of Thunder); 2. Nijuuisseiki no Fu-chi-ku (二十一世紀の瘋痴狂; The 21st Century Hoochie Koo); 3. Rock 'n' roll Tokkyuu (ロックンロール特急; Rock 'n' roll Express); 4. Shinagawa Shinjuu (品川心中; Love Suicide At Shinagawa); 5. Aoi Shoudou (青い衝動; Blue Impulse); 6. Mujihi naru Seishun (無慈悲なる青春; Ruthless Youth); 7. Fuwaku no Michi (不惑の路; Road of 40 Years Old); 8. Sanshou-uo (山椒魚; Salamander); 9. Kyoufu!! Fujitsubo Ningen (恐怖!!ふじつぼ人間; Terror!! Barnacles Man); 10. Koritsu-muen no Shisou (孤立無援の思想; Lonely Thought); 11. Ankoku Seiun (暗黒星雲; Dark Nebula); 12. Genshoku no Kotou (幻色の孤島; Phantom Island)	—
2007	Manatsu no Yoru no Yume (真夏の夜の夢; A Midsummer Night's Dream): 1. Yoru ga Naku (夜が哭く; Night Wail); 2. Tenraku no Gakuten (転落の楽典; Music of Downfall); 3. Seinen wa Kouya wo Mezasu (青年は荒野を目指す; Youth Beyond the Wasteland); 4. Soratobu Enban (空飛ぶ円盤; Flying Saucer); 5. Saru no Sendan (猿の船団; Monkeys Fleet); 6. Enma-chou (閻魔帳; Necrology); 7. Hakujitsu-mu (白日夢; Daydream); 8. Botan Dourou (牡丹燈籠; Peony Lantern); 9. Sekai ni Hanataba wo (世界に花束を; Flowers for World); 10. Umi Monogatari (膿物語; Pus Story); 11. Himan Tenshi (Metabolic Angel) (肥満天使（メタボリックエンジェル）; The Obese Angel); 12. Dottoharai (どっとはらい; That's All For Tonight)	178
2009	Mirai Roman-ha (未来浪漫派; Futuristic Romanticism): 1. Taiyou no Botsuraku (太陽の没落; Downfall of the Sun); 2. Kagayakeru Ishi (輝ける意志; Shining Will); 3. Roman-ha Sengen (浪漫派宣言; Declaration of Romantic School); 4. Shifuku no Rock 'n' roll (至福のロックンロール; Blissful Rock 'n' roll); 5. Ai no Housoku (愛の法則; Law of Love); 6. Aka to Kuro (赤と黒; Red and Black); 7. Meido Kissa (冥土喫茶; Hades Cafe); 8. Tou no Naka no Otoko (塔の中の男; The Man in the Tower); 9. Gekka ni Sasagu Butou-kyoku (月下に捧ぐ舞踏曲; Dance music to the Moon); 10. Yama-san (ヤマさん; Mr. Yama); 11. Aki no Yonaga no Mystery (秋の夜長のミステリー; Mystery of Long Autumn Nights); 12. Bacchiri Ikitai Komori-uta (ばっちりいきたい子守唄; Cradlesong of Want Perfectly); 13. Shin-en (深淵; The Abyss)	
2011	Shigan Raisan (此岸礼讃; In Praise of This World): 1. Futtou suru Uchuu (沸騰する宇宙; Boiling Universe); 2. Ahodara-kyou (阿呆陀羅経; Satirical Sutra); 3. A-Toukai yo Ima Izuko (あゝ東海よ今いずこ; Ah, Where is Tokai Now); 4. Hikari e Wasshoi (光へワッショイ; Light to Heave-Ho); 5. Giragira shita Sekai (ギラギラした世界; Glaring World); 6. Haru no Nioi wa Nehan no Kaori (春の匂いは涅槃の薫り; Spring Smell is Nirvana Fragrance); 7. Akuma to Seppun (悪魔と接吻; Kiss with Devil); 8. Nageba Yama gara Mokko kuru (泣げば山がらもっこ来る; If You Cry, Monster Comes From The Mountain); 9. Kochou-ran (胡蝶蘭; Phalaenopsis); 10. Chitei eno Toubou (地底への逃亡; Escape to the Center of the Earth); 11. Gusha no Rakuen (愚者の楽園; Paradise of Fools); 12. Jigoku no Rock Band (地獄のロックバンド; Hell's Rock Band); 13. Konjaku Hijiri (今昔聖; Monk in Past and Present)	59
2013	Mandoro (萬燈籠; Ten Thousand Garden Lanterns): 1. Shigan Goeika (此岸御詠歌; Hymn of this World); 2. Kuroyuri Nikki (黒百合日記; Black Lily Diary); 3. Jigokuhen (地獄変; Painting of Hell ) 4. Sakura Ranman (桜爛漫; Cherry Blossoms Glorious); 5. Neputa no Mondoriko (ねぷたのもんどりこ; Neputa Coming Home); 6. Shinchou Kyurakyukyu-bushi (新調きゅらきゅきゅ節; New Kyurakyukyu Song); 7. Neko ja Neko ja (猫じゃ猫じゃ; It's a Cat, It's a Cat); 8. Kumo no Ito (蜘蛛の糸; The Spider's Thread); 9. Juusan-seiki no Hanayome (十三世紀の花嫁; Bride of the 13th Century); 10. Tsuki no Monna Lisa (月のモナリザ; Mona Lisa of the Moon); 11. Jikan kara no Kage (時間からの影; The Shadow Out of Time); 12. Jinsei Banzai (人生万歳; Long Live Life); 13. Eisei ni natta Otoko (衛星になった男; The Man who Turned into a Satellite)	35
2014	Burai Houjou (無頼豊饒; Fertility of License): 1. Hyouchou no Teikoku (表徴の帝国; The Empire of Signs); 2. Namahage (なまはげ); 3. Jigoku no Ryouri-nin (地獄の料理人; Hellish Cook); 4. Meishin (迷信; Superstition); 5. Umare Izuru Tamashii (生まれ出づる魂; Soul Born); 6. Shitsuu-busshou (悉有仏性; Universal Buddha-Nature); 7. Uchuusen Miroku-gou (宇宙船弥勒号; Spaceship Maitreya); 8. Ligeia (リジイア); 9. Ms. Android (ミス・アンドロイド); 10. Gusukoo Budori (グスコーブドリ); 11. Garandou no Chikyuu (がらんどうの地球; Empty Earth); 12. Kekkon Kyousou-kyoku (結婚狂想曲; Crazy Wedding March); 13. Reijuu no Sakebi (隷従の叫び; Shout of Slavery)	27
2016	Kaidan Soshite Shi to Eros (怪談 そして死とエロス; Ghost Stories and Eros and Thanatos): 1. Kyoufu no Daiou (恐怖の大王; Great King of Terror); 2. Hoichi Junan (芳一受難; Hoichi's Passion); 3. Kikka no Kazoe-uta (菊花の数え唄; Counting Song of Chrysanthemum Flower); 4. Ookami no Tasogare (狼の黄昏; Wolf's Twilight); 5. Nemuri-otoko (眠り男; Sleeping Guy); 6. Yomi-gaeri no Machi (黄泉がえりの街; The city from Hades); 7. Yuki-onna (雪女; The Woman Of The Snow); 8. Sanzu no Kawa (三途の川; Sanzu River); 9. Doro no Ame (泥の雨; Mud Rain); 10. Chou-nouryoku ga Atta nara (超能力があったなら; If I Had Supernatural Powers); 11. Jigoku no Kyuuen (地獄の球宴; Hell's Ball Game); 12. Madame Edwarda (マダム・エドワルダ)	22
2017	Ijigen kara no Houkou (異次元からの咆哮; Roar from Another Dimension): 1. Kyomu no Koe (虚無の声; Voice of Nothing); 2. Fuujin (風神; God of the Wind); 3. Chou-shizen Genshou (超自然現象; Supernatural Phenomenon); 4. Tsukiyo no Oni-odori (月夜の鬼踊り; Oni Dancing in the Moonlight Night); 5. Mononoke Fever (もののけフィーバー; Monster Fever); 6. Uchuu no Symphony (宇宙のシンフォニー; Symphony of the Universe); 7. Taiyou ga Ippai (太陽がいっぱい; Full of Sun); 8. Chijin no Monologue (痴人のモノローグ; Monologue of Fool); 9. Akuma Kitousho (悪魔祈祷書; Devil's Prayer Book); 10. Akumu no Tenjouin (悪夢の添乗員; Tour Conductor of Nightmare); 11. Jigoku no Heavy Rider (地獄のヘビーライダー; Heavy Rider from Hell); 12. Itansha no Kanashimi (異端者の悲しみ; Sorrow Of An Outsider)	18
2019	Shin Seinen (新青年; New Youth): 1. Shin Seinen Maegaki (新青年まえがき; Preface of New Youth); 2. Kagami Jigoku (鏡地獄; Hellish Mirror); 3. Tokushin (瀆神; Blasphemy); 4. Yaneura no Sanposha (屋根裏の散歩者; Watcher in the Attic); 5. Gankutsu-Ou (巌窟王; The Count of Monte Cristo); 6. Irohanihoheto (いろはにほへと; Even the Blossoming Flowers); 7. Uchuu no Disclosure (宇宙のディスクロージャー; Disclosure by Universe); 8. Anata no Shiranai Sekai (あなたの知らない世界; The World You Don't Know); 9. Jigoku Kozou (地獄小僧; Hellish Kid); 10. Jigoku no Moushigo (地獄の申し子; Hell-sent Child); 11. Tsuki no Apenin-san (月のアペニン山; The Appenins of the Moon); 12. An'ya Kouro (暗夜行路; A Dark Night's Passing); 13. Mujou no Scat (無情のスキャット; Heartless Scat); 14. Jigoku no Gochisou (地獄のご馳走; Hell's Banquet) *Bonus track only on CD	14
2021	Kuraku (苦楽; Pain and Comfort): 1. Toshishun (杜子春); 2. Kamigami no Koushin (神々の行進; March Of The Gods); 3. Akuma no shohousen (悪魔の処方箋; Devil's Prescription); 4. Ankoku Ou (暗黒王; The Darkness King); 5. Ningen Robot (人間ロボット; Robotized Human); 6. Uchuu Kaizoku (宇宙海賊; Space Bandits); 7. Hashire GT (疾れGT; Go, GT, Go); 8. Seikimatsu Jinta (世紀末ジンタ; Jinta The Apocalypse); 9. Nayami wo Tsukinukete Kanki ni Itare (悩みをつき抜けて歓喜に到れ; Go Over You Worry Be Joy); 10. Koukotsu no Kamakiri (恍惚の蟷螂; Praying Mantis in Ecstasy); 11. Shijou no Kuchibiru (至上の唇; Supreme Lips); 12. Nikutai no Bourei (肉体の亡霊; Ghost Of The Body); 13. Yoakemae (夜明け前; Before The Dawn)	20
2023	Shikisoku Zekuu (色即是空; Matter Is Void): 1. Saraba Sekai (さらば世界; Farewell to the World); 2. Kamigami no Kessen (神々の決戦; Battle of the Deities); 3. Ikiru (生きる; Live); 4. Akuma Ichizoku (悪魔一族; Clan of Devil); 5. Kyouki Ningen (狂気人間; Mad Man); 6. Ningen no Shoumei (人間の証明; Proof of the Man); 7. Uchuu Dengekitai (宇宙電撃隊; Space Blizkrieg Squadron); 8. Uchuu no Hito Wandaraa (宇宙の人ワンダラー; Spaceman Wanderer); 9. Mirai Kara no Dasshutsu (未来からの脱出; Escape from the Future); 10. Jigoku Daitetsudou (地獄大鉄道; Hell Great Railway); 11. Hoshizora no Michibiki (星空の導き; Guidance of the Starry Sky); 12. Namekuji Taisou (蛞蝓体操; Slug’s Gymnastic); 13. Shide no Tabiji no Monogatari (死出の旅路の物語; Tale of the Death's Journey)	
2025	Mahoroba (まほろば; Arcadia): 1. Mahoroba (まほろば; Arcadia); 2. Jigoku Saiban (地獄裁判; Hell Trial); 3. Ashura Daiou (阿修羅大王; Great King Ashura); 4. Uchuu Yuukai (宇宙誘拐; Space Abduction); 5. Yasei Joutou (野性上等; Long Live Wildness!); 6. Yamagami (山神; Mountain Deity); 7. Ren'ai Ichidai Otoko (恋愛一代男; A Man Who Lives for Love); 8. Bakaccho Tosei (ばかっちょ渡世; Foolish Life); 9. Towa no Kane (永遠の鐘; Eternal Bell); 10. Jueki Sakaba de Kanpai (樹液酒場で乾杯; Cheers at the Sap Tavern!); 11. Kandou no Rutsubo (感動の坩堝; Crucible of Emotion); 12. Akuma no Rakuen (悪魔の楽園; Devil's Paradise); 13. Hikari no Kodomo (光の子供; Children of Light)	24

==== Best-of Albums ====
Year	Album details	Chart
1994	Petenshi to Kuuki Otoko ~Ningen Isu Kessaku-sen~ (ペテン師と空気男〜人間椅子傑作選〜; A Swindler And An Aerial Man 〜 Ningen Isu Greatest Hits): 1. Shinpan no Hi (審判の日; Judgment Day); 2. Kokoro no Kaji (心の火事; Fires of the Heart); 3. Koufuku no Neji (幸福のねじ; Happy Screw); 4. Ayakashi no Tsuzumi (あやかしの鼓; Ghost Drums); 5. Yashaga-ike (夜叉ヶ池; Pond of Yaksha); 6. Namake-mono no Jinsei (なまけ者の人生; A Life of the Idler); 7. Taiyou Kokuten (太陽黒点; Sunspot); 8. Aomori Rock Daijin (青森ロック大臣; Rock Minister in Aomori); 9. Tengoku ni Musubu Koi (天国に結ぶ恋; Love Connected to Heaven); 10. Jinmen-sou (人面瘡; Human-Faced Carbuncle); 11. Dai Yogen (大予言; Great Prophecy); 12. Hashire Melos (走れメロス; Run Melos)s; 13. Motto Hikari wo! (もっと光を！; More Light!); 14. Ringo no Namida (りんごの泪; Apple's Tears); 15. Shide-mushi no Uta (埋葬蟲の唄; Sexton, Sexton, on the Wall)	
2002	Oshie to Tabi suru Otoko ~Ningen Isu Kessaku-sen vol.2~ (押絵と旅する男〜人間椅子傑作選 第2集〜; The Traveler With The Pasted Rag Picture 〜 Ningen Isu Greatest Hits Vol.2): 1. Kurai Nichiyoubi (暗い日曜日; Gloomy Sunday); 2. Dodarebachi (どだればち); 3. Dynamite (ダイナマイト); 4. Jigoku (地獄; Inferno); 5. Kuroneko (黒猫; Black Cat); 6. Tentai Shikou-shou (天体嗜好症; The Morbid Palatability to Astronomy); 7. Yuurei Ressha (幽霊列車; Ghost Train); 8. Mushi (蟲; Bug); 9. Kuroi Taiyou (黒い太陽; Black Sun); 10. Kaijin Nijuu Mensou (怪人二十面相; The Fiend With Twenty Faces); 11. Jigoku Fuukei (地獄風景; Hell View); 12. Shinigami no Kyouen (死神の饗宴; Feast Of The Reaper); 13. Mishiranu Sekai (見知らぬ世界; Unknown World)	
2009	Ningen-Isu Kessaku-sen Nijusshunen Kinen Best Ban (人間椅子傑作選 二十周年記念ベスト盤; Ningen Isu Greatest Hits The 20th Anniversary Best Album) DISC1: 1. Injuu (陰獣; Beast In The Shadows); 2. Hari no Yama (針の山; Hell's Mountain Of Needles); 3. Ringo no Namida (りんごの泪; Apple's Tears); 4. Tengoku ni Musubu Koi (天国に結ぶ恋; Love Connected to Heaven); 5. Sai no Kawara (賽の河原; The Children's Limbo); 6. Jinmen-sou (人面瘡; Human-Faced Carbuncle); 7. Yashaga-ike (夜叉ヶ池; Pond of Yaksha); 8. Koufuku no Neji (幸福のねじ; Happy Screw); 9. Rashōmon (羅生門); 10. Dynamite (ダイナマイト); 11. Kurai Nichiyoubi (暗い日曜日; Gloomy Sunday); 12. Dodarebachi (どだればち); 13. Jigoku (地獄; Inferno); 14. Kuroneko (黒猫; Black Cat); DISC2: 1. Tetsugoushi Mokushi-roku (鉄格子黙示録; Apocalypse of Iron Grill); 2. Ryouki ga Machi ni Yatte Kuru (猟奇が街にやって来る; Bizarre Hunter Come to Town); 3. Mushi (蟲; Bug); 4. Yuurei Ressha (幽霊列車; Ghost Train); 5. Jigoku Fuukei (地獄風景; Hell View); 6. Shinigami no Kyouen (死神の饗宴; Feast Of The Reaper); 7. Soukoku no Ie (相剋の家; House Of Conflict); 8. Doutei (道程; Journey); 9. Senrei (洗礼; Baptisma); 10. Kyoufu!! Fujitsubo Ningen (恐怖!!ふじつぼ人間; Terror!! Barnacles Man); 11. Shinagawa Shinjuu (品川心中; Love Suicide At Shinagawa); 12. Umi Monogatari (膿物語; Pus Story); 13. Dottoharai (どっとはらい; That's All For Tonight); 14. Kuruizaki (狂ひ咲き; Bloom of Madness)	160
2014	Utsushiyo wa Yume ~25 Shunen Kinen Best Album~ (現世は夢 〜25周年記念ベストアルバム〜; This World Is A Dream ~The 25th Anniversary Best Album) DISC1: 1. Hari no Yama (針の山; Hell's Mountain Of Needles); 2. Ringo no Namida (りんごの泪; Apple's Tears); 3. Tengoku ni Musubu Koi (天国に結ぶ恋; Love Connected to Heaven); 4. Sai no Kawara (賽の河原; The Children's Limbo); 5. Jinmen-sou (人面瘡; Human-Faced Carbuncle); 6. Dynamite (ダイナマイト); 7. Jigoku (地獄; Inferno); 8. Kuroneko (黒猫; Black Cat); 9. Yuurei Ressha (幽霊列車; Ghost Train); 10. Jigoku Fuukei (地獄風景; Hell View); 11. Shinigami no Kyouen (死神の饗宴; Feast Of The Reaper); 12. Soukoku no Ie (相剋の家; House Of Conflict); 13. Shinagawa Shinjuu (品川心中; Love Suicide At Shinagawa); 14. Injuu (陰獣; Beast In The Shadows); 15. Shinkei-shou I LOVE YOU (神経症 I LOVE YOU; Neurosis I LOVE YOU); DISC2: 1. Dottoharai (どっとはらい; That's All For Tonight); 2. Meido Kissa (冥土喫茶; Hades Cafe); 3. Shin-en (深淵; The Abyss); 4. Konjaku Hijiri (今昔聖; Monk in Past and Present); 5. Kumo no Ito (蜘蛛の糸; The Spider's Thread); 6. Neputa no Mondoriko (ねぷたのもんどりこ; Neputa Returns); 7. Shinchou Kyurakyukyu-bushi (新調きゅらきゅきゅ節; New Kyurakyukyu Song); 8. Jigoku no Ryouri-nin (地獄の料理人; Hellish Cook); 9. Namahage (なまはげ); 10. Jigoku eno Shoutai-Jou (地獄への招待状; Invitation to Hell); 11. Akutoku no Sakae (悪徳の栄え; Sade Trial); 12. Kanashiki Toshokan-in (悲しき図書館員; Sad Librarian); 13. Uchuu kara no Iro (宇宙からの色; The Colour out of Space)	50
2019	Ningen-Isu Meisaku-sen 30 Shunen Kinen Best Ban (人間椅子名作選 三十周年記念ベスト盤; Ningen Isu Greatest Hits The 30th Anniversary Best Album) DISC1: 1. Inochi Urimasu (命売ります; Life For Sale); 2. Inju (陰獣; Beast In The Shadows); 3. Hari No Yama (針の山; Hell's Mountain Of Needles); 4. Namahage (なまはげ); 5. Hoichi Junan (芳一受難; Hoichi's Passion); 6. Jinmensou (人面瘡; Human-Faced Carbuncle); 7. Rashomon (羅生門); 8. Shinagawa Shinju (品川心中; Love Suicide At Shinagawa); 9. Ringo No Namida (りんごの泪; Apple's Tears); 10. Yuki onna (雪女; The Woman Of The Snow); 11. Sai No Kawara (賽の河原; The Children's Limbo); 12. Itansha No Kanashimi (異端者の悲しみ; Sorrow Of An Outsider); 13. Dynamite (ダイナマイト); 14. Dottoharai (どっとはらい; That's All For Tonight); DISC2: 1. Ai No Nirvana (愛のニルヴァーナ; Love Nirvana); 2. Akumu No Josho (悪夢の序章; The Preface Of The Nightmare); 3. Uchu Kara No Iro (宇宙からの色; The Colour Out Of Space); 4. Senrei (洗礼; Baptisma); 5. Soukoku No Ie (相剋の家; House Of Conflict); 6. Jigoku (地獄; Inferno); 7. Shin'en (深淵; The Abyss); 8. Shinigami No Kyoen (死神の饗宴; Feast Of The Reaper); 9. Kuroneko (黒猫; Black Cat); 10. Imomushi (芋虫; The Caterpillar); 11. Mujou No Scat (無情のスキャット; Heartless Scat)	22

==== Live albums ====
Year	Album details	Chart
2010	Shippuu Dotou ~Ningen Isu Live! Live!! (疾風怒濤〜人間椅子ライブ!ライブ!!; Sturm Und Drang ~Ningen Isu Live! Live!!) DISC1 (CD): 1. Tetsugoushi Mokushi-roku (鉄格子黙示録; Apocalypse of Iron Grill; Live at OSAKA MUSE, Osaka); 2. Kyoufu!! Fujitsubo Ningen (恐怖!!ふじつぼ人間; Terror!! Barnacles Man; Live at ell.FITS.ALL, Nagoya); 3. Ringo no Namida (りんごの泪; Apple's Tears; Live at Shibuya O-WEST, Shibuya, Tokyo); 4. Tou no Naka no Otoko (塔の中の男; The Man in the Tower; Live at OSAKA MUSE, Osaka); 5. Mushi (蟲; Bug; Live at OSAKA MUSE, Osaka); 6. Shinagawa Shinjuu (品川心中; Live at OSAKA MUSE, Osaka); 7. Sai no Kawara (賽の河原; The Children's Limbo; Live at ell.FITS.ALL, Nagoya); 8. Dodarebachi (どだればち; Live at OSAKA MUSE, Osaka); 9. Injuu (陰獣; Beast In The Shadows; Live at ell.FITS.ALL, Nagoya); 10. Suibotsu Toshi (水没都市; Submerged City; Live at OSAKA MUSE, Osaka); 11. Shinigami no Kyouen (死神の饗宴; Feast Of The Reaper; Live at OSAKA MUSE, Osaka); DISC2 (CD): 1. Shin-en (深淵; The Abyss; Live at OSAKA MUSE, Osaka); 2. Kokoro no Kaji (心の火事; Fires of the Heart Live at OSAKA MUSE, Osaka); 3. Kurai Nichiyoubi (暗い日曜日; Gloomy Sunday; Live at ell.FITS.ALL, Nagoya); 4. Meido Kissa (冥土喫茶; Hades Cafe; Live at Shibuya O-WEST, Shibuya, Tokyo); 5. Soukoku no Ie (相剋の家; House Of Conflict; Live at OSAKA MUSE, Osaka); 6. Aka to Kuro (赤と黒; Red and Black; Live at OSAKA MUSE, Osaka); 7. Jigoku (地獄; Inferno; Live at Shibuya O-WEST, Shibuya, Tokyo); 8. Tengoku ni Musubu Koi (天国に結ぶ恋; Love Connected to Heaven; Live at ell.FITS.ALL, Nagoya); 9. Hari no Yama (針の山; Hell's Mountain Of Needles; Live at ell.FITS.ALL, Nagoya); 10. Jinmen-sou (人面瘡; Human-Faced Carbuncle; Live at OSAKA MUSE, Osaka); 11. Doutei (道程; Journey; Live at OSAKA MUSE, Osaka); 12. Jigoku Fuukei (地獄風景; Hell View; Live at Shibuya O-WEST, Shibuya, Tokyo); 13. Koufuku no Neji (幸福のねじ; Happy Screw; Live at OSAKA MUSE, Osaka); 14. Dynamite (ダイナマイト; Live at OSAKA MUSE, Osaka); 15. Dottoharai (どっとはらい; That's All For Tonight; Live at OSAKA MUSE, Osaka); DISC3 (DVD); Live at Shibuya O-WEST, Shibuya, Tokyo: 1. Tetsugoushi Mokushi-roku (鉄格子黙示録; Apocalypse of Iron Grill); 2. Ringo no Namida (りんごの泪; Apple's Tears); 3. Tou no Naka no Otoko (塔の中の男; The Man in the Tower); 4. Sai no Kawara (賽の河原; The Children's Limbo); 5. Injuu (陰獣; Beast In The Shadows); 6. Shin-en (深淵; The Abyss); 7. Shinigami No Kyoen (死神の饗宴; Feast Of The Reaper); 8. Meido Kissa (冥土喫茶; Hades Cafe); 9. Soukoku no Ie (相剋の家; House Of Conflict); 10. Aka to Kuro (赤と黒; Red and Black); 11. Jigoku (地獄; Inferno); 12. Tengoku ni Musubu Koi (天国に結ぶ恋; Love Connected to Heaven); 13. Hari no Yama (針の山; Hell's Mountain Of Needles); 14. Jinmen-sou (人面瘡; Human-Faced Carbuncle) [Encore]; 15. Doutei (道程; Journey) [Encore]; 16. Jigoku Fuukei (地獄風景; Hell View); 17. Dottoharai (どっとはらい; That's All For Tonight) [Double Encore]; Bonus. Promotion Video for Shinagawa Shinjuu (品川心中; Love Suicide At Shinagawa)	180
2017	Ifuu Doudou ~Ningen Isu Live!! (威風堂々〜人間椅子ライブ!!; Pomp And Circumstance ~Ningen Isu Live!!) DISC1 (CD): 1. Ahodara-kyou (阿呆陀羅経; Satirical Sutra; Live at TSUTAYA O-EAST, Shibuya, Tokyo); 2. Neputa no Mondoriko (ねぷたのもんどりこ; Neputa Returns; Live at TSUTAYA O-EAST, Shibuya, Tokyo); 3. Yuki-onna (雪女; The Woman Of The Snow; Live at Shinjuku ReNY, Shinjuku, Tokyo); 4. Jigoku no Kyuuen (地獄の球宴; Hell's Ball Game; Live at TSUTAYA O-EAST, Shibuya, Tokyo); 5. Uchuu kara no Iro (宇宙からの色; The Colour out of Space; Live at Shinjuku ReNY, Shinjuku, Tokyo); 6. Rashomon (羅生門; Live at TSUTAYA O-EAST, Shibuya, Tokyo); 7. Jikan kara no Kage (時間からの影; The Shadow Out of Time; Live at umeda AKASO, Osaka); 8. Imomushi (芋虫; The Caterpillar; Live at umeda AKASO, Osaka); 9. Kyouki Sanmyaku (狂気山脈; At the Mountains of Madness; Live at Shinjuku ReNY, Shinjuku, Tokyo); 10. Ningen Shikkaku (人間失格; No Longer Human; Live at TSUTAYA O-EAST, Shibuya, Tokyo); 11. Yashaga-ike (夜叉ヶ池; Pond of Yaksha; Live at Shinjuku ReNY, Shinjuku, Tokyo); DISC2 (CD): 1. Kyoufu no Daiou (恐怖の大王; Great King of Terror; Live at Shinjuku ReNY, Shinjuku, Tokyo); 2. Hoichi Junan (芳一受難; Hoichi's Passion; Live at umeda AKASO, Osaka); 3. Konjaku Hijiri (今昔聖; Monk in Past and Present; Live at TSUTAYA O-EAST, Shibuya, Tokyo); 4. Mishiranu Sekai (見知らぬ世界; Unknown World; Live at umeda AKASO, Osaka); 5. Senrei (洗礼; Baptisma; Live at TSUTAYA O-EAST, Shibuya, Tokyo); 6. Kuroneko (黒猫; Black Cat; Live at Akasaka BLITZ, Minato, Tokyo); 7. Chou-nouryoku ga Atta nara (超能力があったなら; If I Had Supernatural Powers; Live at TSUTAYA O-EAST, Shibuya, Tokyo); 8. Kumo no Ito (蜘蛛の糸; The Spider's Thread; Live at umeda AKASO, Osaka); 9. Umi Monogatari (膿物語; Pus Story; Live at Shinjuku ReNY, Shinjuku, Tokyo); 10. Meishin (迷信; Superstition; Live at Shinjuku ReNY, Shinjuku, Tokyo); 11. Hari no Yama (針の山; Hell's Mountain Of Needles; Live at umeda AKASO, Osaka); 12. Shinchou Kyurakyukyu-bushi (新調きゅらきゅきゅ節; New Kyurakyukyu Song; Live at TSUTAYA O-EAST, Shibuya, Tokyo); 13. Jigoku eno Shoutai-Jou (地獄への招待状; Invitation to Hell; Live at umeda AKASO, Osaka); 14. Namahage (なまはげ; Live at Shinjuku ReNY, Shinjuku, Tokyo)	

=== Singles ===
Year	Single details	Format
1991	Yashaga-ike (夜叉ヶ池; Pond of Yaksha): 1. Yashaga-ike (夜叉ヶ池; Pond of Yaksha); 2. Jinmen-sou (人面瘡; Human-Faced Carbuncle)	8cmCD
1991	Koufuku no Neji (幸福のねじ; Happy Screw): 1. Koufuku no Neji (幸福のねじ; Happy Screw); 2. Heisei Asaborake (平成朝ぼらけ; Dawn of the Heisei Period)	8cmCD
1993	Motto Hikari wo! (もっと光を！; More Light!): 1. Motto Hikari wo! (もっと光を！; More Light!); 2. Namake-mono no Jinsei <single version> (なまけ者の人生 [シングルバージョン]; Life of an Idler<single version>); 3. Daiyogen <bonus track> (大予言 [ボーナストラック]; A Big Prophecy [bonus track]); 4. Motto Hikari wo! <karaoke> (もっと光を！ [カラオケ]; More Light! <karaoke>)	8cmCD
1996	Katana to Saya (刀と鞘; Sword and Sheath): 1. Katana to Saya (刀と鞘; Sword and Sheath); 2. Ouka Ondo (桜下音頭; March Under the Cherry Tree); 3. Ouka Ondo <karaoke> (桜下音頭 [カラオケ]; March Under the Cherry Tree <karaoke>)	8cmCD
2015	Doro no Ame ~NINJA SLAYER Ver. (泥の雨～ニンジャスレイヤーVer.; Mud Rain ~NINJA SLAYER Ver.): 1. Doro no Ame ~ NINJA SLAYER Ver. (泥の雨～ニンジャスレイヤーVer.; Mud Rain ~NINJA SLAYER Ver.)	download
2015	Jigoku no Aloha (地獄のアロハ; Hell's Aloha) - by Kinniku Shōjo Tai with Ningen Isu: 1. Jigoku no Aloha (地獄のアロハ; Hell's Aloha); 2. Dynamite [Kinniku Shōjo Tai Version] (ダイナマイト [筋肉少女帯 Version]; Dynamite [Kinniku Shōjo Tai Version]); 3. Shōnen, Gurigurimegane wo Hirou [Ningen Isu Version] (少年、グリグリメガネを拾う [人間椅子 Version]; Boy Picks Up Muzzle Glasses [Ningen Isu Version]); 4. Jigoku no Aloha [Heavenly Version] (地獄のアロハ [Heavenly Version]; Hell's Aloha [Heavenly Version]); 5. Jigoku no Aloha（KARAOKE） (地獄のアロハ（KARAOKE）; Hell's Aloha（KARAOKE）); 6. Dynamite [Kinniku Shōjo Tai Version]（KARAOKE） (ダイナマイト [筋肉少女帯 Version]（KARAOKE）; Dynamite [Kinniku Shōjo Tai Version]（KARAOKE）); 7. Shōnen, Gurigurimegane wo Hirou [Ningen Isu Version]（KARAOKE） (少年、グリグリメガネを拾う [人間椅子 Version]（KARAOKE）; Boy Picks Up Muzzle Glasses [Ningen Isu Version]（KARAOKE）); 8. Jigoku no Aloha [Heavenly Version]（KARAOKE） (地獄のアロハ [Heavenly Version]（KARAOKE）; Hell's Aloha [Heavenly Version]（KARAOKE）)	CD/DVD
2015	Doro no Ame (泥の雨; Mud Rain): 1. Doro no Ame (泥の雨; Mud Rain)	download
2016	Hari no Yama (針の山; Hell's Mountain Of Needles): 1. Hari no Yama (針の山; Hell's Mountain Of Needles); 2. Ringo no Namida (りんごの泪; Apple's Tears)	Phonograph record
2018	Inochi Urimasu (命売ります; Life for Sale): 1. Inochi Urimasu (命売ります; Life for Sale)	download
2020	Mugen no Juunin Butou-Hen (無限の住人 武闘編; Blade of the Immortal: The Fatal Battle): 1. Mugen no Juunin Butou-Hen (無限の住人 武闘編; Blade of the Immortal: The Fatal Battle); 2. Mugen no Juunin Butou-Hen (TV-Ban) (無限の住人 武闘編（TV版）; Blade of the Immortal: The Fatal Battle (TV-edition) )	download

=== Videos ===
Year	Videos details	Format
1991	Yuigon-jou Housou (遺言状放送; Testament Broadcasting) LIVE ―Introduction―: 1. Tengoku ni Musubu Koi (天国に結ぶ恋; Love Connected to Heaven); 2. Yuigon-jou Housou (遺言状放送; Testament Broadcasting); ―Intermission―: 3. Ayakashi no Tsuzumi (あやかしの鼓; Ghost Drums); 4. Shinkei-shou I LOVE YOU (神経症 I LOVE YOU; Neurosis I LOVE YOU); 5. Rock and Roll (Led Zeppelin cover); 6. Heavy Metal no Gyakushuu (ヘヴィ・メタルの逆襲; Counter of Heavy Metal); 7. 21st Century Schizoid Man (King Crimson cover); Promotion Video Ringo no Namida (りんごの泪; Apple's Tears) Yashaga-ike (夜叉ヶ池; Pond of Yaksha) ―Ending― Bonus Track Seikimatsu dai Yogen - Musekinin Henshuu: Ningen Isu (世紀末大予言 - 無責任編集：人間椅子; A Great Deal of Late Century - Editor：Ningen Isu）	VHS
2000	Kaijin Nijuu Mensou (怪人二十面相; The Fiend With Twenty Faces) Kaijin Nijuu Mensou (怪人二十面相; The Fiend With Twenty Faces)［PV］ PV Making Movie Album "Kaijin Nijuu Mensou" (怪人二十面相; The Fiend With Twenty Faces) 15s CM Album "Kaijin Nijuu Mensou" (怪人二十面相; The Fiend With Twenty Faces) 30s CM	VHS
2002	Mishiranu Sekai (見知らぬ世界; The World Unknown) Promotion Video Mishiranu Sekai (見知らぬ世界; The World Unknown) Yuurei Ressha (幽霊列車; Ghost Train) LIVE: 1. Koufuku no Neji (幸福のねじ; Happy Screw); 2. Ringo no Namida (りんごの泪; Apple's Tears); 3. Kaijin Nijuu Mensou (怪人二十面相; The Fiend With Twenty Faces); 4. Amairo no Scarf (亜麻色のスカーフ; Flax Color Scarf); 5. Yaneura no Neputa Matsuri (屋根裏のねぷた祭り; Neputa Festival in Attic); 6. Mura no Hazure de Big Bang (村の外れでビッグバン; Big Bang in Village Side); 7. Dodarebachi (どだればち); 8. Bacchus Gurui (莫迦酔狂ひ; Bacchus Drunk Crazy); 9. Jigoku (地獄; Inferno); 10. Jigoku Fuukei (地獄風景; Hell View); Bonus Track Tokai no Douwa (都会の童話; Fairytale of Urban)	VHS
2006	Yuigon-jou Housou (遺言状放送; Testament Broadcasting) LIVE ―Introduction―: 1. Tengoku ni Musubu Koi (天国に結ぶ恋; Love Connected to Heaven); 2. Yuigon-jou Housou (遺言状放送; Testament Broadcasting); ―Intermission―: 3. Ayakashi no Tsuzumi (あやかしの鼓; Ghost Drums); 4. Shinkei-shou I LOVE YOU (神経症 I LOVE YOU; Neurosis I LOVE YOU); 5. Rock and Roll (Led Zeppelin cover); 6. Heavy Metal no Gyakushuu (ヘヴィ・メタルの逆襲; Counter of Heavy Metal); 7. 21st Century Schizoid Man (King Crimson cover); Promotion Video Ringo no Namida (りんごの泪; Apple's Tears) Yashaga-ike (夜叉ヶ池; Pond of Yaksha) ―Ending―	DVD
2006	Mishiranu Sekai (見知らぬ世界; The World Unknown) Promotion Video Mishiranu Sekai (見知らぬ世界; The World Unknown) Yuurei Ressha (幽霊列車; Ghost Train) LIVE: 1. Koufuku no Neji (幸福のねじ; Happy Screw); 2. Ringo no Namida (りんごの泪; Apple's Tears); 3. Kaijin Nijuu Mensou (怪人二十面相; The Fiend With Twenty Faces); 4. Amairo no Scarf (亜麻色のスカーフ; Flax Color Scarf); 5. Yaneura no Neputa Matsuri (屋根裏のねぷた祭り; Neputa Festival in Attic); 6. Mura no Hazure de Big Bang (村の外れでビッグバン; Big Bang in Village Side); 7. Dodarebachi (どだればち); 8. Bacchus Kurui (莫迦酔狂ひ; Bacchus Drunk Crazy); 9. Jigoku (地獄; Inferno); 10. Jigoku Fuukei (地獄風景; Hell View); Bonus Track Tokai no Douwa (都会の童話; Fairytale of Urban) Touyou no Majo (東洋の魔女; Oriental Witch)［PV］ Senrei (洗礼; Baptism)［PV］	DVD
2015	Kurushimi mo Yorokobi mo Yume nareba koso "Utsushiyo ha Yume - Band Seikatsu 25 Shuunen -" in Shibuya Koukaidou Kouen (苦しみも喜びも夢なればこそ「現世は夢～バンド生活二十五年～」渋谷公会堂公演; Pain and Joy is a Dream "This World is a Dream - Band Life 25th Anniversary -" in Shibuya Public Hall) LIVE: 1. Uchuu kara no Iro (宇宙からの色; The Colour out of Space); 2. Jigoku eno Shoutai-Jou (地獄への招待状; Invitation to Hell); 3. Shinchou Kyurakyukyu-bushi (新調きゅらきゅきゅ節; New Kyurakyukyu Song); 4. Neputa no Mondoriko (ねぷたのもんどりこ; Neputa Returns); 5. Shinkei-shou I LOVE YOU (神経症 I LOVE YOU; Neurosis I LOVE YOU); 6. Sakura no Mori no Mankai no Shita (桜の森の満開の下; In the Forest, Under Cherries in Full Bloom); 7. Konjaku Hijiri (今昔聖; Monk in Past and Present); 8. Senrei (洗礼; Baptisma); 9. Akutoku no Sakae (悪徳の栄え; Prosperity of Vice); 10. Meido Kissa (冥土喫茶; Hades Cafe); 11. Shin-en (深淵; The Abyss); 12. Kumo no Ito (蜘蛛の糸; The Spider's Thread); 13. Jigoku no Ryouri-nin (地獄の料理人; Hellish Cook); 14. Meishin (迷信; Superstition); 15. Hari no Yama (針の山; Hell's Mountain Of Needles); 16. Injuu (陰獣; Beast In The Shadows); 17. Mishiranu Sekai (見知らぬ世界; The World Unknown); 18. Namahage (なまはげ); Bonus Track（MV） Namahage (なまはげ) Uchuu kara no Iro (宇宙からの色; The Colour out of Space)	DVD/Blu-ray
2018	Odoro Mandara -Music Video Shu- (おどろ曼荼羅～ミュージックビデオ集～; Horrid Mandala -Music VIdeo Collection-): 1. Ringo no Namida (りんごの泪; Apple's Tears) (1990); 2. Yashaga-ike (夜叉ヶ池; Pond of Yaksha) (1991); 3. Girigiri Highway (ギリギリ・ハイウェイ; Barely Highway) (1995); 4. Dynamite (ダイナマイト) (1995); 5. Yuurei Ressha (幽霊列車; Ghost Train) (1999); 6. Kaijin Nijuu Mensou (怪人二十面相; The Fiend With Twenty Faces) (2000); 7. Mishiranu Sekai (見知らぬ世界; The World Unknown) (2001); 8. Touyou no Majo (東洋の魔女; Oriental Witch) (2003); 9. Senrei (洗礼; Baptisma) (2004); 10. Shinagawa Shinjuu (品川心中; Love Suicide At Shinagawa) (2006); 11. Roman-ha Sengen (浪漫派宣言; Declaration of Romantic School) (2009); 12. Namahage (なまはげ) (2014); 13. Uchuu kara no Iro (宇宙からの色; The Colour out of Space) (2014); 14. Kyoufu no Daiou (恐怖の大王; Great King of Terror) (2016); 15. Kyomu no Koe (虚無の声; Voice of Nothing) (2017); 16. Inochi Urimasu (命売ります; Life For Sale) (2018)	DVD/Blu-ray
