= Kogoro Akechi =

Fictional character created by Edogawa Ranpo

- Kogoro Akechi character
- Kogoro Akechi, as he appeared in volume 2 of Detective Conan
- First appearance: "The Case of the Murder on D. Hill"
- Created by: Edogawa Ranpo

In-universe information
- Gender: Male
- Occupation: Private investigator
- Family: Fumiyo Akechi (wife)
- Nationality: Japanese

Kogoro Akechi (明智 小五郎, Akechi Kogorō) is a fictional private detective created by Japanese mystery writer Edogawa Ranpo.

== Overview ==
Akechi first appeared in the story "The Case of the Murder on D. Hill" (D坂の殺人事件, D-zaka no satsujin jiken) in January 1925 and continued to appear in stories for a quarter of a century. Edogawa Ranpo (a pseudonym for Tarō Hirai) is considered the father of the Japanese detective story and was a great admirer of Sir Arthur Conan Doyle. Akechi is the first recurring detective character in Japanese fiction and is clearly inspired by Doyle's Sherlock Holmes.

Like Holmes, Akechi is a brilliant but eccentric detective who consults with the police on especially difficult cases. He is a master of disguise and an expert at judo whose genius lets him solve seemingly impossible cases. Also like Holmes, Akechi makes use of a group of young boys to gather information. His version of the Baker Street Irregulars is known as the "Boy Detectives Club" (少年探偵団, Shōnen tantei dan). Akechi smokes Egyptian cigarettes when he is thinking about a case.

Kogoro Akechi is a tall, handsome man with heavy eyebrows who dresses well. He is married to a woman named Fumiyo (文代) and lives with Kobayashi Yoshio (小林芳雄), the leader of the Boy Detectives Club. Kobayashi often plays an important part in solving cases. Like his mentor, he is an expert at disguise and is especially adept at posing as a young woman. Aside from these relationships little is known of the detective's personal life, which always takes a back seat to the mystery in his adventures.

Detective Akechi's most frequent foe is the infamous "Fiend with Twenty Faces" (怪人二十面相, Kaijin ni-jū mensō). The fiend is a master criminal whose infallible gift for disguise may have been inspired by Hamilton Cleek, Thomas W. Hanshew's heroic but amoral "Man of Forty Faces." The Fiend is a non-violent criminal who steals to demonstrate his brilliance rather than out of need for money. He and Akechi have a mutual respect in the stories.

The Akechi stories are based mainly in the detective's home city of Tokyo, though some move the action to the Japanese countryside. The stories often feature supernatural and erotic overtones, though not so much as Ranpo's other fiction.

== Bibliography ==
=== Short stories ===
- "The Case of the Murder on D. Hill" (D坂の殺人事件, D-zaka no satsujin jiken; January 1925) Published in English in The Early Cases of Akechi Kogoro.
- "The Psychological Test" (心理試験, Shinri Shiken; February 1925) Published in English in Japanese Tales of Mystery and Imagination.
- "The Black Hand Gang" (黒手組, Kurote-gumi; March 1925) Published in English in The Early Cases of Akechi Kogoro.
- "The Ghost" (幽霊, Yūrei; May 1925) Published in English in The Early Cases of Akechi Kogoro.
- "The Stalker in the Attic" (屋根裏の散歩者, Yaneura no Sanposha; August 1925) Published in English in The Edogawa Rampo Reader.
- "Who" (何者, Nanimono; November 1929)
- "The Murder Weapon" (兇器, Kyōki; June 1954)
- "Moon and Gloves" (月と手袋, Tsuki to Tebukuro; April 1955)

=== Novels ===
- The Dwarf (一寸法師, Issun-bōshi; 1926) Published in English in The Early Cases of Akechi Kogoro.
- The Spider-Man (蜘蛛男, Kumo-Otoko; 1929)
- The Edge of Curiosity-Hunting (猟奇の果, Ryōki no Hate; 1930)
- The Conjurer (魔術師, Majutsu-shi; 1930) First appearance of Fumiyo
- The Vampire (吸血鬼, Kyūketsuki; 1930) First appearance of Kobayashi
- Gold Mask (黄金仮面, Ōgon-kamen; 1930) English edition was published by Kurodahan Press in 2019.
- The Black Lizard (黒蜥蜴, Kuro-tokage; 1934) Published in English in The Black Lizard and Beast in the Shadows.
- The Human Leopard (人間豹, Ningen-Hyō; 1934)
- The Devil's Crest (悪魔の紋章, Akuma no Monshō; 1937)
- Dark Star (暗黒星, Ankoku-sei; 1939)
- Hell's Clown (地獄の道化師, Jigoku no Dōkeshi; 1939)
- Monster's Trick (化人幻戯, Kenin Gengi; 1954)
- Shadow-Man (影男, Kage-otoko; 1955)

=== The Boy Detectives Club series (a.k.a. Fiend with Twenty Faces series) ===
This is a juvenile mystery series.

Novels

1. The Fiend with Twenty Faces (怪人二十面相, Kaijin ni-jū Mensō; 1936) English edition was published by Kurodahan Press in 2012.
2. The Boy Detectives Club (少年探偵団, Shōnen Tantei-dan; 1937) English edition was published by Kodansha in 1988.
3. Doctor Phantom (妖怪博士, Yōkai Hakase; 1938)
4. Large Gold Bullion (大金塊, Dai Kinkai; 1939)
5. Bronze Monster (青銅の魔人, Seidō no Majin; 1949)
6. Conjurer under the Ground (地底の魔術王, Chitei no Majutsuō; 1950)
7. Invisible Fiend (透明怪人, Tōmei Kaijin; 1951)
8. The Fiend with Forty Faces (怪奇四十面相, Kaiki shijū mensō; 1952)
9. Fiend from Space (宇宙怪人, Uchū Kaijin; 1953)
10. Terror of the Iron Tower Kingdom (鉄塔王国の恐怖, Tettō Ōkoku no Kyōfu; 1954)
11. Gray Giant (灰色の巨人, Haiiro no Kyojin; 1955)
12. Conjurer under the Sea (海底の魔術師, Kaitei no Majutsu-shi; 1955)
13. Golden Leopard (黄金豹, Ōgon Hyō; 1956)
14. Doctor Magic (魔法博士, Mahō Hakase; 1956)
15. Fiend of the Circus (サーカスの怪人, Sākasu no Kaijin; 1957)
16. Gong the Monster (魔人ゴング, Majin Gongu; 1957) originally titled "Yōjin Gong" (妖人ゴング)
17. Magic Doll (魔法人形, Mahō Ningyō; 1957)
18. Secret of the Bizarre Mask Castle (奇面城の秘密, Ki-men-jō no Himitsu; 1958)
19. Glow-in-the-dark Monster (夜光人間, Yakō Ningen; 1958)
20. Conjurer on the Tower (塔上の奇術師, Tō-jō no Kijutsu-shi; 1958)
21. Q the Iron Man (鉄人Q, Tetsujin Q; 1958)
22. Horrible Masked King (仮面の恐怖王, Kamen no Kyōfu-ō; 1959)
23. M the Electric Man (電人M, Denjin M; 1960)
24. Curse of the Fiend with Twenty Faces (二十面相の呪い, Nijūmensō no Noroi; 1960) originally titled "Ore wa Nijūmensōda!!" (おれは二十面相だ!!)
25. The Fiend with Twenty Faces in the Sky (空飛ぶ二十面相, Soratobu Nijūmensō; 1961) originally titled "Yōseijin R" (妖星人R)
26. Golden Monster (黄金の怪獣, Ōgon no Kaijū; 1962) originally titled "Superhuman Nicola" (超人ニコラ, Chōjin Nikora)

Novellas and short stories

- Golden Tiger (黄金の虎, Ōgon no Tora; 1955)
- Monster in the Sky (天空の魔人, Tenkū no Majin; 1956)
- Magic House (まほうやしき, Mahō Yashiki; 1957)
- Red Beetle (赤いカブトムシ, Akai Kabuto-mushi; 1957)
- Enigmatic Man (ふしぎな人, Fushigi na Hito; 1958)
- The Fiend with Twenty Faces (かいじん二十めんそう, Kaijin ni-jū Mensō; 1959) serialized in the magazine Tanoshii Ni-nensei
- The Fiend with Twenty Faces (かいじん二十めんそう, Kaijin ni-jū Mensō; 1959) serialized in the magazine Tanoshii Ichi-nensei
- The Fiend and the Boy Detectives (怪人と少年探偵, Kaijin to Shōnen Tantei; 1960)

== In popular culture ==
Akechi has become a fixture in Japanese pop culture, and references to him are common in Japanese fiction. There have been several movies made based on his adventures, some of which pit him against fictional characters such as Arsène Lupin. The actor best known for playing the detective is Eiji Okada. Akechi has been featured as a character in the manga Lupin III and its anime pilot. He is probably best known in the West through the 1994 movie Rampo.

Another notable movie featuring Akechi is the 1968 film Black Lizard, directed by Kinji Fukasaku and adapted from Ranpo's novel of the same name by author Yukio Mishima, who appears briefly in the film. The story pits the detective against the titular villain, a female mastermind who is played by cross-dressing actor Akihiro Miwa. The film is considered high camp with its bizarre conventions and over-the-top performances, but has a loyal following among fans and critics alike.

Modern references to Akechi can also be found in Gosho Aoyama's popular and long-running manga series Detective Conan. One of the characters, Detective Kogoro Mori, is a persistent and courageous, yet highly flawed and lecherous, private detective—almost a parody of Kogoro Akechi. He has his cases solved for him by the youthful protagonist Conan Edogawa, whose elementary school detective club is the "Detective Boys". Akechi himself is highlighted in volume 2 of the manga, in "Gosho Aoyama's Mystery Library", a section of the graphic novels where the author introduces a different literary detective or villain. Further references to Akechi are seen in Gosho Aoyama's series Magic Kaito, where a master thief steals high-profile items for recognition.

Both Akechi and the Black Lizard are referenced in the Sakura Wars series of video games and anime. One of the musicals performed by the Teikoku Kagekidan is Benitokage ("Crimson Lizard"), which features the titular character, a criminal femme fatale, along with a handsome young detective named Akechi Kojiro. The manga and anime Nijū Mensō no Musume, or the Daughter of Twenty Faces, focuses heavily on Akechi's arch-rival and features Akechi as a minor character. Akechi is also referenced in the character of Police Superintendent Akechi Kengo in the popular detective manga series Kindaichi Case Files. In the media franchise Tantei Opera Milky Holmes, Akechi is represented by a female police detective named Kokoro Akechi.

In 2015, a new anime series entitled Rampo Kitan: Game of Laplace was created, based on the mystery novels of Edogawa Ranpo and in commemoration of the 50th anniversary of his death. The story follows Kobayashi, a reference to the leader of the Boy Detectives, who becomes assistant to eccentric 17-year-old Akechi. In the anime, Twenty Faces also makes an appearance as a vigilante serial killer.

In October 2016, an anime titled Trickster: From Edogawa Ranpo's "The Boy Detectives Club" was made, based on the stories of the Boy's Detective Club. The plot takes place in the future period of the 2030s and follows Kogorou Akechi, who meets the mysterious Yoshio Kobayashi. Kobayashi, who has an undying body because of an "unidentified fog," wishes for his own death, but together they both pursue a mysterious criminal, nicknamed the "Fiend with Twenty Faces".

Goro Akechi, a character in the 2016 video game Persona 5, is a deliberate homage to Akechi. His name is derived from Akechi, and his early role in the game as a celebrity detective who opposes the Phantom Thieves, especially their leader Joker, whose Persona Arsene is named after the original Lupin, mirrors the original Akechi's role in Edogawa's works. His role in the game's story, combined with Joker's ability to change Personas, serves as an homage to the rivalry between Akechi and the Fiend with Twenty Faces.

In 2013 and 2014, a pair of films were made pairing Akechi with another famous fictional Japanese detective, Seishi Yokomizo's Kosuke Kindaichi. Hideaki Itô portrayed Akechi, whilst Tomohisa Yamashita played Kindaichi.

The main characters of the detective themed magical girl anime Star Detective Precure!, Akechi Anna and Kobayashi Mikuru are named after Akechi Kogoro and Kobayashi Yoshio, while their crossdressing enemy Nijee is based on "Fiend with Twenty Faces".

In the manga Bishoku tantei Akechi Gorō by Akiko HIGASHIMURA, the main character is a detective named Akechi Gorō, a likely inspiration from Akechi Kogoro.

== List of film adaptations ==
- Hyôchû no Bijo (1950) (starring Jōji Oka)
- Shonen tanteidan: Nijumenso no akuma (1956) (starring Eiji Okada)
- Shonen tanteidan: Tetto no kaijin (1957) (starring Eiji Okada)
- Shonen tanteidan: Yako no majin (1957) (starring Susumu Namishima)
- Shonen tanteidan: Nijumenso no fukushu (1957) (starring Susumu Namishima)
- Shonen tanteidan: Kubinashi-otoko (1958) (starring Susumu Namishima)
- Kumo-otoko no gyakushū (1958) (starring Susumu Fujita)
- Shonen tanteidan: Tomei kaijin (1958) (starring Susumu Namishima)
- Satsujinki: Kumo-otoko (1958) (starring Susumu Fujita)
- Kurotokage (1962) (starring Minoru Ōki)
- Black Lizard (1968) (starring Isao Kimura)
- Horrors of Malformed Men (1969) (starring Minoru Ōki)
- A Watcher in the Attic (1993) (starring Kyūsaku Shimada)
- Rampo (1994) (starring Masahiro Motoki)
- Murder on D Street (1998) (starring Kyūsaku Shimada)
- Blind Beast vs. Dwarf (2001) (starring Shinya Tsukamoto)
- Rampo Noir (2005) (starring Tadanobu Asano)
- K-20: Legend of the Mask (2008) (starring Tōru Nakamura)
- Yaneura no sanposha (2016) (starring Kouta Kusano)
- Kuro tokage (2019) (starring Kento Nagayama)

== See also ==
- Kosuke Kindaichi
