= Duklyon: Clamp School Defenders =

Manga

- Duklyon CLAMP School Defenders
- Cover from Clamp Duklyon volume 1, originally published by Kadokawa Shoten

学園特警デュカリオン (Gakuen Tokkei DUKLYON)
- Genre: Comedy, supernatural
- Manga
- Written by: Clamp
- Published by: Kadokawa Shoten
- English publisher: NA: Viz Media
- Magazine: Newtype Comic Genki
- Original run: 1991 – 1993
- Volumes: 2

Duklyon: Clamp School Defenders (学園特警デュカリオン, Gakuen Tokkei Dyukarion) is a manga created by Clamp, a Japanese artistic group of four women. It ran from 1991 to 1993 in Newtype Comic Genki.

The story features two teenagers on Clamp Campus, Kentarou Higashikunimaru and Takeshi Shukaido, who are called upon occasion to become monster-battling superheroes while wearing armored outfits in this comic parody of typical superhero action based manga for boys. They are ordered about by Eri Chusonji, their team leader and informant who has a violent tendency to strike the heads of her subordinates with a mallet. Additional humor results from the story's primary villain falling madly in love with Eri.

Like Clamp School Detectives, Man of Many Faces and X/1999, the story takes places on the pentagram shaped Clamp campus, founded by the Imonoyama family.

Kentarou, Takeshi, and Eri all appear in a chapter of Tsubasa, another manga by Clamp. They also have cameos in a few episodes of Clamp School Detectives and appear in the Clamp in Wonderland anime video. Yasha, the main character's father from Clamp's first manga RG Veda, makes a very brief appearance as a teacher in one of the later chapters of Duklyon.

== Story ==
Duklyon is the name of a bakery at the elite Clamp School. But behind the scenes it's the headquarters for a trio of superheroes also known as Duklyon. When music blares over the loudspeakers the heroes jump down a chute inside an oven to their secret lair. Kentarou Higashikunimaru (東国丸 健多朗, Higashikunimaru Kentarō) and Takeshi Shukaido (秋海 洞威, Shukaido Takeshi) are childhood friends who excel in different areas of athletics (track and field for Kentarou, kendo for Takeshi) and they do most of the physical work. The group is headed by Eri Chusonji (宙尊寺 絵里衣, Chusonji Erii), who rarely gets her hands dirty but is all too ready to beat up Kentarou and Takeshi over their antics by hitting them on their heads with a mallet. Then there's the mysterious General, who issues out Duklyon's missions.

Duklyon battles the evil Imonoyama Shopping District, whose goal is world domination. This group is headed by Kotobuki Sukiyabashi (数奇屋橋寿, Sukiyabashi Kotobuki), a shy good-natured classmate of Kentarou and Takeshi. The Imonoyama Shopping District goes to unique ways to ensure their goals; taking various classes hostage, hijacking the lunch room, and even kidnapping Utako Okawa (大川 詠心, Ōkawa Utako), the Elementary School's student body president. But Duklyon always shows up to save the day.

Both Kentarou and Takeshi dress up in Metal Hero-esque outfits (Kentarou in red, Takeshi in blue) while they're fighting. However, they don't go by codenames and frequently yell each other's names in battle. Eri dresses in a skimpy space suit (with no mask) and Kotobuki wears a large elaborate outfit (with no mask). Even the General is very obviously Nokoru Imonoyama (妹之山 残, Imonoyama Nokoru) (leader of the Clamp School Detectives), though wearing a large pair of sunglasses. Despite this, all of them manage to keep their secret identities a secret from the general public (and Duklyon doesn't know who the General is).
