= Rampo Noir =

- Film poster
- Directed by: Akio Jissoji; Atsushi Kaneko; Hisayasu Satō; Suguru Takeuchi
- Written by: Atsushi Kaneko; Akio Satsukawa; Suguru Takeuchi; Shirō Yumeno
- Based on: Kagami jigoku, Mushi, Imomushi, and Kasei no unga by Edogawa Ranpo
- Starring: Tadanobu Asano; Mikako Ichikawa; Yumi Yoshiyuki; Ryuhei Matsuda; Hiroki Narimiya; Nao Ōmori; Yūko Daike
- Music by: Saiko Ai; Kohei Aramaki; Ryoji Ikeda; Otomo Yoshihide
- Release date: November 5, 2005 (Japan)
- Running time: 134 minutes
- Country: Japan
- Language: Japanese

Rampo Noir (Japanese: 乱歩地獄, Hepburn: Ranpo jigoku) is a 2005 Japanese anthology film consisting of four segments based on works by Edogawa Ranpo.

The film was rereleased by Arrow Video in Blu-ray on January 7th, 2025.

== Synopsis ==
=== Mars Canal ===
A story told without speaking. It tells the story of a naked man who wanders through a depressing and desolate landscape recalling memories of his former lover.

=== Mirror Hell ===
The story revolves around Ranpo's fictional detective Kogoro Akechi (played Tadanobu Asano), as he tries to find out why several women are being found dead with burnt faces and charred skulls. During his investigation, he finds an odd hand mirror at the scene that starts unraveling the mystery.

=== Caterpillar ===
A war hero returns home with severe injuries. He is deaf with no limbs and only his eyesight remaining. His beautiful wife, tired of taking care of him, turns to torturing him for her amusement.

=== Crawling Bugs ===
An actress is returning home from a successful night on stage, until her limo driver decides that she should be coming home with him.

== Reception ==
Variety wrote: "Sadism triumphs over atmosphere in Rampo Noir, a colorful but over-arty quartet of Japanese horror yarns."
