= Masahiro Kawasaki =

Japanese composer (1949–2006)

Masahiro Kawasaki 川崎 真弘
- Born: Masafumi Kawasaki; 15 September 1949; Kitakyushu, Fukuoka
- Died: 4 May 2006 (aged 56) Inage-ku, Chiba
- Occupations: Musician and composer

Masahiro Kawasaki (川崎 真弘, Kawasaki Masahiro; 15 September 1949 – 4 May 2006) was a Japanese musician and composer, born in Kitakyushu, Fukuoka. As a musician, he played keyboards in a number of bands, including Ryudo Uzaki's Ryūdōgumi. As a composer for film, television, and anime, he won awards of excellence at the Japan Academy Prize for his film scores for Rampo and Kin'yu Fushoku Rettō: Jubaku. He was also nominated for best original film score for the Taiwanese film Rice Rhapsody at the Golden Horse Awards.

He died of liver cancer at the age of 56 on 4 May 2006 in Inage-ku, Chiba.

== Partial filmography ==
- Kozure Ôkami: Sono chîsaki te ni (1993)
- Rampo (1994)
- Kamikaze Taxi (1995)
- Kin'yu Fushoku Rettō: Jubaku (1999)
- Off-Balance (2001)
- Rice Rhapsody (2004)
