= Edogawa =

Edogawa may refer to:

- Edogawa, Tokyo
- Edo River

== People with the surname ==
- Edogawa Ranpo (1894–1965), Japanese author
- Conan Edogawa, the main character of the Case Closed manga
- Keishi Edogawa, a pen name of author Takashi Nagasaki
