= Clamp School Detectives =

1992 manga

- Cover of Clamp School Detectives volume 1 as published by Kadokawa Shoten

CLAMP 学園探偵団 (Kuranpu Gakuen Tanteidan)
- Genre: Comedy, detective fiction
- Manga
- Written by: Clamp
- Published by: Kadokawa Shoten
- English publisher: NA: Viz Media
- Magazine: Monthly Asuka
- Original run: April 1992 – December 1993
- Volumes: 3
- Anime television series
- Directed by: Osamu Nabeshima
- Produced by: Noriko Kobayashi; Akira Noguchi; Kazuhiko Ikeguchi; Yūko Kuwazono; Ken Hagino
- Written by: Mayori Sekijima; Masaharu Amiya
- Music by: Mikiya Katakura (Ali Project)
- Studio: Pierrot
- Licensed by: NA: Maiden Japan
- Original network: TV Tokyo
- English network: SEA: Animax
- Original run: 3 May 1997 – 25 October 1997
- Episodes: 26

Clamp School Detectives (Japanese: CLAMP学園探偵団, Hepburn: Kuranpu Gakuen Tanteidan), also known as CLAMP Campus Detectives, is a manga series by Clamp, which was adapted into a 26-episode anime series, produced by Bandai Visual and Studio Pierrot. The manga series was serialized in Kadokawa Shoten's Monthly Asuka manga magazine between January 1992 and October 1993, spanning three tankōbon, while the anime premiered in Japan on TV Tokyo between May 3, 1997, and October 25, 1997.

An early work of the all-female manga artist group Clamp, the series outlines the adventures of the Elementary School Student Board in their attempt to better the lives of the female population of Clamp School.

Tokyopop have released the manga in English across North America in three volumes. Now it's currently available on Kindle through Viz Media. Bandai Entertainment released the anime as one of their initial titles. It is now licensed by Maiden Japan. The anime series has been translated and dubbed into English by the anime television network, Animax, who have broadcast the series across its respective English-language networks in Southeast Asia and India.

== Plot ==
The Clamp School Detectives is a series of episodic cases.

== Characters ==
=== Main characters ===
Nokoru Imonoyama (妹之山 残, Imonoyama Nokoru)
A 6th grade student and the elementary school board chairman. The youngest son of the Imonoyama zaibatsu, the founders of Clamp School, he has inherited the family fondness of doing absurd things just for the sake of doing them. Nokoru has one of the top IQs in a school full of geniuses and NASA has been vying for the mind of the elementary schooler. He also has the unique ability to detect a lady in distress from two kilometers away. He is also infamous for being a flirt. For this reason, he established the Clamp School Detective Agency, although this was also an incentive to get out of his chairman duties. He is also the only one out of the three young detectives that doesn't play a sport. Nokoru also appears in Clamp's Duklyon: Clamp School Defenders, Man of Many Faces, Tsubasa: Reservoir Chronicle and X/1999. Nokoru Imonoyama is voiced by Akemi Okamura in Japanese and Juliet Cesario in English.
Suoh Takamura (鷹村 蘇芳, Takamura Suō)
A 5th grader and the elementary school board secretary. Suoh is a martial arts expert, with a 3rd dan blackbelt in Karate, Judo, Aikido, and Kendo (he would have gone higher, but he ran out of competition), he's also good in kyūdō. He is also the descendant of a Japanese ninja clan, and has sworn to protect Nokoru through anything. Suoh first met Nokoru three years prior (him being in 2nd grade) to the story but at first he was avoiding Nokoru. S is also responsible for making sure the chairman does all of his paperwork on time. Suoh is in love with Nagisa. Suoh also appears in Clamp School Paranormal Investigators, Man of Many Faces, Tsubasa: Reservoir Chronicle and X/1999. Suoh Takamura is voiced by Shiho Niiyama in Japanese and Ashley Knight in English.
Akira Ijuin (伊集院 玲, Ijūin Akira)
A 4th grader and the elementary school board treasurer. Akira is a first-class chef, a trait he inherited from his father. He lives with his two mothers and has also inherited his father's legacy as the notorious thief 20 Masks. Akira is in love with Utako. Akira also appears in Clamp's Man of Many Faces, Duklyon: Clamp School Defenders, Tsubasa: Reservoir Chronicle and X/1999. Akira Ijuin is voiced by Omi Minami in Japanese and Shannon Hemeon in English.

=== Supporting characters ===
Utako Okawa (大川 詠心, Ōkawa Utako)
A kindergarten student and president of the Kindergarten Student Division Council. At first, she thought that her friend, Nagisa, was being attacked by people who are jealous of her. Akira has a crush on her and vice versa. She believes they will get married someday. She has an older sister named Mako. She also appears in Clamp's Man of Many Faces and makes a cameo appearance in Tsubasa: Reservoir Chronicle. Utako Ohkawa is voiced by Yuko Miyamura in Japanese and Rachael Moser in English.
Nagisa Azuya (梓夜 凪砂, Azuya Nagisa)
A kindergarten student and friend of the president of the Kindergarten Student Division Council, she plays the flute very beautifully. At first, Suoh thought that she was a wisteria fairy and an illusion; after hearing Utako Ohkawa talk about her, however, he knew she was real. Her mother is a famous traditional Japanese dancer and her father is well known for playing for royalty. She has enough talent to surpass her parents. Suoh has a crush on her and vice versa. She briefly appears in her adult form in the penultimate chapter of Man of Many Faces. Nagisa Azuya is voiced by Haruna Ikezawa in Japanese and Pamela Weidner-Houle in English.
Takeshi Shukaido (秋海 洞威, Shukaido Takeshi)
Takeshi is a high school freshman at the CLAMP School High School Division, part of homeroom Z. He practices kendo and won the championship his freshman year. He was asked to be one of the Duklyon Defenders after winning the championship along with Kentarou Higashikunimaru (東国丸 健多朗, Higashikunimaru Kentarō). Takeshi has a more serious personality and is quick to anger over the mistakes and antics of Kentaro. He comes from a poor family and works in order to earn money. When asked, he is quick to deny having any relationship with Kentaro. Shukaido Takashi is voiced by Takeshi Kusao in Japanese and Jason Hatfield in English.

== Media ==
=== Manga ===
No.	Original release date	Original ISBN	North American release date	North American ISBN
01	April 30, 1992	978-4049246643	April 15, 2003	978-1-59182-294-3
02	April 1, 1993	978-4049246650	June 17, 2003	978-1-59182-295-0
03	December 1, 1993	978-4049246667	August 12, 2003	978-1-59182-296-7

=== Anime ===
An anime adaptation directed by Osamu Nabeshima and produced by the animation studio Pierrot aired in Japan on TV Tokyo for 26 episodes from May 3, 1997, to October 25, 1997. Bandai Visual released the series on 13 VHS and LD volumes and in a DVD box. The anime was licensed by Bandai Entertainment as one of their launching titles and released the anime on subtitled VHS under the AnimeVillage label. Bandai eventually re-released the series on DVD with an English dub produced by Coastal Studios. Maiden Japan has since relicensed the series; they re-released it on DVD on September 13, 2016.
