= The Fiend with Twenty Faces =

Fictional character created by Edogawa Ranpo

- Kogoro Akechi/The Boy Detectives Club character
- First appearance: The Fiend with Twenty Faces
- Created by: Edogawa Rampo

In-universe information
- Alias: Heikichi Endo (遠藤平吉) (real name)

The Fiend with Twenty Faces (Japanese: 怪人二十面相, Hepburn: Kaijin Nijū Mensō) is a fictional character who serves as a recurring antagonist for Kogoro Akechi in Edogawa Rampo's mystery fiction. A gentleman thief and master of disguise, he is considered Akechi's archenemy or most famous adversary.

== Creation and origin ==
Edogawa Rampo, already known as a successful detective and horror writer, gained an assignment writing for Shōnen Club, a magazine aimed at young children. Government regulations and societal norms meant that many of Rampo's normal plot elements were off the table, such as putting the protagonist children in direct danger. Rampo decided to create a villain related to his existing world and created a new rival for his detective character Kogoro Akechi. Rampo based his new character on Arsène Lupin, a gentleman thief. He originally intended to name the character Kaitō Nijū Mensō ("The Phantom Thief with Twenty Faces"), as Lupin was referred to as a kaitō, but this was ruled out by his editors. "Kaijin" ("Strange Person", "Fiend") was approved, however, giving him his published name.

He makes his first appearance in The Fiend with Twenty Faces published in 1936, the first installment of Rampo's "The Boy Detectives Club" series. The titular antagonist threatens Tokyo, but with the country's greatest detective Kogorō Akechi away on overseas business, it is up to his 10-year old assistant Kobayashi Yoshio and the Boy Detectives Club (Shōnen Tantei-dan) to save the day. In these stories, Akechi is generally busy in the first half, Twenty Faces will either steal or threaten to steal some valuable item, the kids will come close to foiling him, and Akechi will dramatically return to foil the plan and ensure the kids were never overly threatened.

== In other media ==
The Fiend with Twenty Faces has appeared in other media and served as inspiration for other works, including the two novels Kaijin Nijū Mensō Den (怪人二十面相・伝) by Sō Kitamura and its film adaptation, the manga series Man of Many Faces by Clamp and Nijū Mensō no Musume by Shinji Ohara, and anime Trickster in which he was voiced by Japanese singer-songwriter Gackt. In March 2021 it was announced that a new adaptation, produced in a dramatic reading format with a modern noir twist, would be performed at the Shinagawa Prince Theater and star Yabana Rei of the J-pop boyband 7 Men Samurai in the role of protagonist Akechi.

An alternate version of him serves as the main protagonist of Persona 5 who uses his talents as a Gentleman/Phantom Thief to correct injustice. The game solidifies the protagonist as being the Fiend by incorporating a unique take on Kogoro Akechi. This version of both characters portrays them as two sides of the same coin; both fighting for justice, but forever at odds with each other over the methods.

== See also ==
- The Monster with 21 Faces
