= Edogawa Ranpo =

Japanese author (1894–1965)

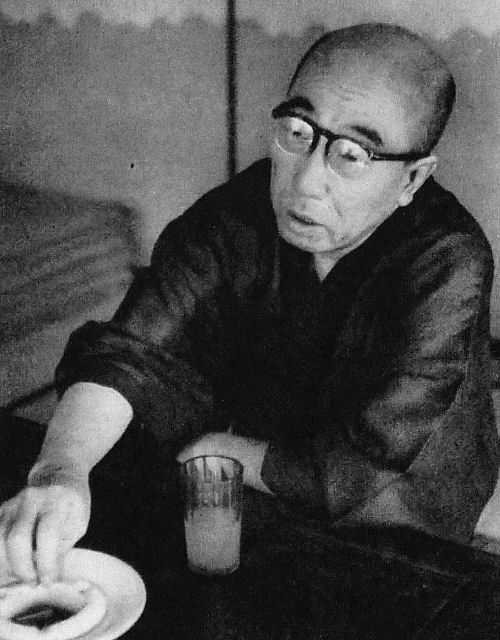
- Hirai in 1947
- Born: Tarō Hirai; October 21, 1894; Mie, Empire of Japan
- Died: July 28, 1965 (aged 70)
- Education: Waseda University
- Occupations: Novelist, literary critic
- Writing career
- Language: Japanese
- Years active: 1923–1960
- Genres: Mystery, weird fiction, thriller

In this Japanese name, the surname is Hirai. In the pen name, the surname is Edogawa.

Pen name

Japanese name
- Kyūjitai: 江戶川 亂步
- Shinjitai: 江戸川 乱歩
Transcriptions
- Romanization: Edogawa Ranpo

Real name

Japanese name
- Kanji: 平井 太郎
Transcriptions
- Romanization: Hirai Tarō

Tarō Hirai (平井 太郎, Hirai Tarō; October 21, 1894 – July 28, 1965), better known by the pen name Edogawa Ranpo or Edogawa Rampo (江戸川 乱歩), was a Japanese author and critic who played a major role in the development of Japanese mystery and thriller fiction. Many of his novels involve the detective hero Kogoro Akechi, who in later books was the leader of a group of boy detectives known as the "Boy Detectives Club" (少年探偵団, Shōnen tantei dan).

Ranpo was an admirer of Western mystery writers, and especially of Edgar Allan Poe. His pen name is a rendering of Poe's name; Edogawa (江戸川) is an extremely rare surname in Japan, with roughly 130 people bearing it. Other authors who were special influences on him were Sir Arthur Conan Doyle, whom he attempted to translate into Japanese during his days as a student at Waseda University, and the Japanese mystery writer Ruikō Kuroiwa.

== Biography ==
=== Before World War II ===
Tarō Hirai was born in Nabari, Mie Prefecture in 1894, where his grandfather had been a samurai in the service of Tsu Domain. His father was a merchant, who had also practiced law. The family moved to what is now Kameyama, Mie, and from there to Nagoya when he was age two. At the age of 17, he studied economics at Waseda University in Tokyo starting in 1912. After graduating in 1916 with a degree in economics, he worked a series of odd jobs, including newspaper editing, drawing cartoons for magazine publications, selling soba noodles as a street vendor, and working in a used bookstore.

In 1923, he made his literary debut by publishing the mystery story "The Two-Sen Copper Coin" (二銭銅貨, Ni-sen dōka) under the pen name "Edogawa Ranpo" (pronounced quickly, this humorous pseudonym sounds much like the name of the American pioneer of detective fiction, Edgar Allan Poe, whom he admired). The story appeared in the magazine Shin Seinen, a popular magazine written largely for an adolescent audience. Shin Seinen had previously published stories by a variety of Western authors including Poe, Arthur Conan Doyle, and G. K. Chesterton, but this was the first time the magazine published a major piece of mystery fiction by a Japanese author. Some, such as James B. Harris (Ranpo's first translator into English), have erroneously called this the first piece of modern mystery fiction by a Japanese writer, but well before Ranpo entered the literary scene in 1923, a number of other modern Japanese authors such as Ruikō Kuroiwa, Kidō Okamoto, Jun'ichirō Tanizaki, Haruo Satō, and Kaita Murayama had incorporated elements of sleuthing, mystery, and crime within stories involving adventure, intrigue, the bizarre, and the grotesque. What struck critics as new about Ranpo's debut story "The Two-Sen Copper Coin" was that it focused on the logical process of ratiocination used to solve a mystery within a story that is closely related to Japanese culture. The story involves an extensive description of an ingenious code based on a Buddhist chant known as the "nenbutsu" as well as Japanese-language Braille.

Over the course of the next several years, Edogawa went on to write a number of other stories that focus on crimes and the processes involved in solving them. Among these stories are a number of stories that are now considered classics of early 20th-century Japanese popular literature: "The Case of the Murder on D. Hill" (D坂の殺人事件, D-zaka no satsujin jiken; January 1925), which is about a woman who is killed in the course of a sadomasochistic extramarital affair, "The Stalker in the Attic" (屋根裏の散歩者, Yane-ura no Sanposha; August 1925), which is about a man who kills a neighbor in a Tokyo boarding house by dropping poison through a hole in the attic floor into his mouth, and "The Human Chair" (October 1925), which is about a man who hides himself in a chair to feel the bodies on top of him. Mirrors, lenses, and other optical devices appear in many of Edogawa's other early stories, such as "The Hell of Mirrors".

Although many of his first stories were primarily about sleuthing and the processes used in solving seemingly insolvable crimes, during the 1930s, he began to turn increasingly to stories that involved a combination of sensibilities often called "ero guro nansensu", from the three words "eroticism, grotesquerie, and the nonsensical". The presence of these sensibilities helped him sell his stories to the public, which was increasingly eager to read his work. One finds in these stories a frequent tendency to incorporate elements of what the Japanese at that time called "abnormal sexuality" (変態性欲, hentai seiyoku). For instance, a major portion of the plot of the novel The Demon of the Lonely Isle (孤島の鬼, Kotō no oni), serialized from January 1929 to February 1930 in the journal Morning Sun (朝日, Asahi), involves a homosexual doctor and his infatuation for another main character.

By the 1930s, Edogawa was writing regularly for a number of major public journals of popular literature, and he had emerged as the foremost voice of Japanese mystery fiction. The detective hero Kogorō Akechi, who had first appeared in the story "The Case of the Murder on D. Hill" became a regular feature in his stories, a number of which pitted him against a dastardly criminal known as the Fiend with Twenty Faces, who had an incredible ability to disguise himself and move throughout society. (A number of these novels were subsequently made into films.) The 1930 novel introduced the adolescent Kobayashi Yoshio (小林芳雄) as Kogoro's sidekick, and in the period after World War II, Edogawa wrote a number of novels for young readers that involved Kogoro and Kobayashi as the leaders of a group of young sleuths called the "Boy Detectives Club" (少年探偵団, Shōnen tantei dan). These works were wildly popular and are still read by many young Japanese readers, much like the Hardy Boys or Nancy Drew mysteries are popular mysteries for adolescents in the English-speaking world.

=== During World War II ===
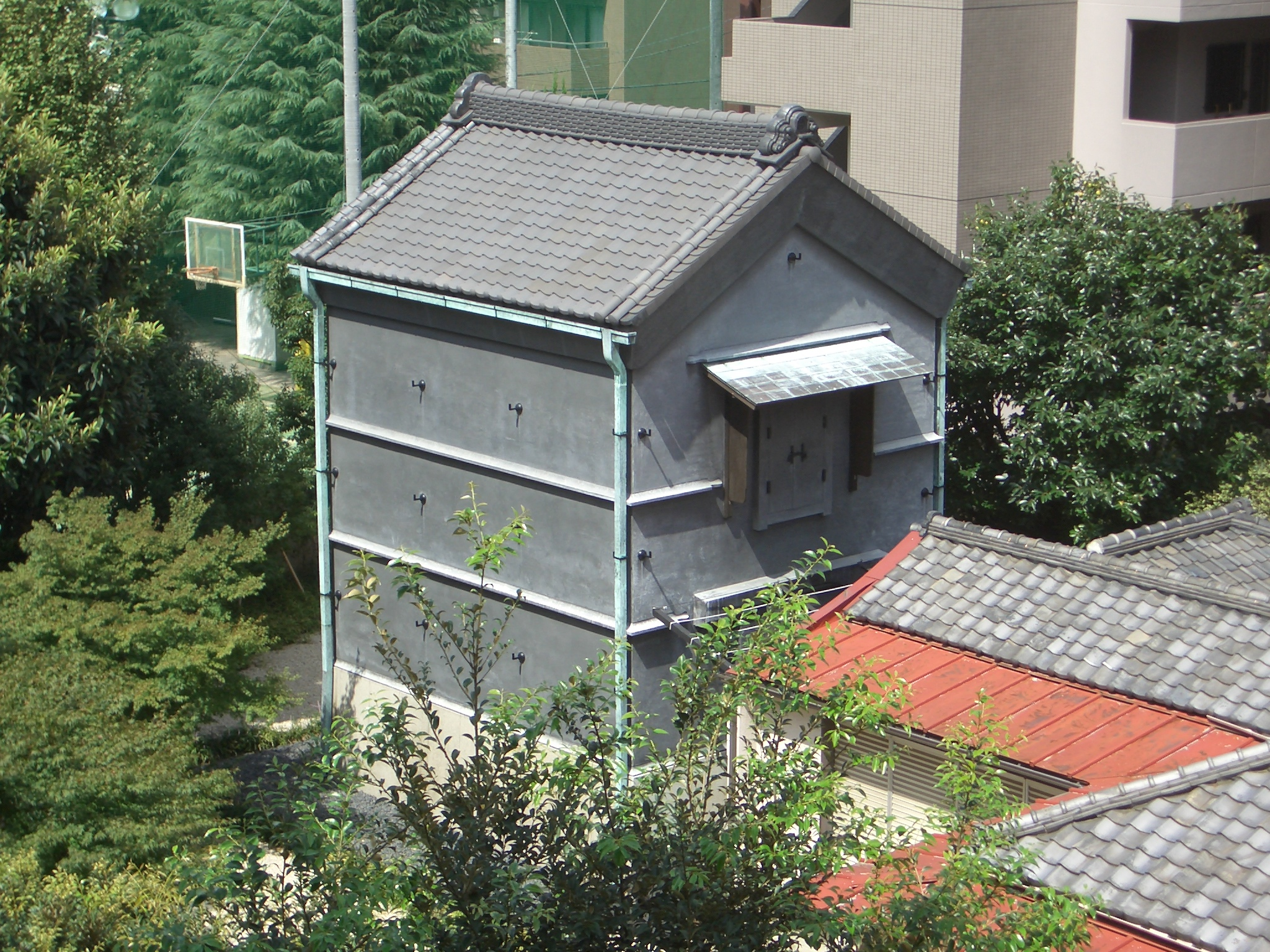
Edogawa Ranpo's studio spared in the Tokyo air raids, now part of the Edogawa Rampo Memorial Center for Popular Culture Studies in Rikkyo University

In 1939, two years after the Marco Polo Bridge Incident and the outbreak of the Second Sino-Japanese War in 1937, Edogawa was ordered by government censors to drop his story "The Caterpillar" (芋虫, Imo Mushi), which he had published without incident a few years before, from a collection of his short stories that the publisher Shun'yōdō was reprinting. "The Caterpillar" is about a veteran who was turned into a quadriplegic and so disfigured by war that he was little more than a human "caterpillar", unable to talk, move, or live by himself. Censors banned the story, apparently believing that the story would detract from the current war effort. This came as a blow to Ranpo, who relied on royalties from reprints for income. (The short story inspired director Kōji Wakamatsu, who drew from it his movie Caterpillar, which competed for the Golden Bear at the 60th Berlin International Film Festival.)

Over the course of World War II, especially during the full-fledged war between Japan and the US that began in 1941, Edogawa was active in his local neighborhood organization, and he wrote a number of stories about young detectives and sleuths that might be seen as in line with the war effort, but he wrote most of these under different pseudonyms as if to disassociate them with his legacy. In February 1945, his family was evacuated from their home in Ikebukuro, Tokyo, to Fukushima in northern Japan. Edogawa remained until June, when he was suffering from malnutrition. Much of Ikebukuro was destroyed in Allied air raids and the subsequent fires that broke out in the city, but the thick, earthen-walled warehouse which he used as his studio was spared, and still stands to this day beside the campus of Rikkyo University.

=== Postwar ===
In the postwar period, Edogawa dedicated a great deal of energy to promoting mystery fiction, both in terms of the understanding of its history and encouraging the production of new mystery fiction. In 1946, he put his support behind a new journal called Jewels (宝石, Hōseki) dedicated to mystery fiction and, in 1947, he founded the Detective Author's Club (探偵作家クラブ, Tantei Sakka Kurabu) which changed its name in 1963 to the Mystery Writers of Japan. In addition, he wrote a large number of articles about the history of Japanese, European, and American mystery fiction. Many of these essays were published in book form. Other than essays, much of his postwar literary production consisted largely of novels for juvenile readers featuring Kogorō Akechi and the Boy Detectives Club.

In the 1950s, he and a bilingual translator collaborated for five years on a translation of Edogawa's works into English, published as Japanese Tales of Mystery and Imagination by Tuttle. Since the translator could speak but not read Japanese and Edogawa could read but not write English, the translation was done aurally, with Edogawa reading each sentence aloud, then checking the written English.

Another of his interests, especially during the late 1940s and 1950s, was bringing attention to the work of his dear friend Jun'ichi Iwata (1900–1945), an anthropologist who had spent many years researching the history of homosexuality in Japan. During the 1930s, Edogawa and Iwata had engaged in a lighthearted competition to see who could find the most books about erotic desire between men. Edogawa dedicated himself to finding books published in the West and Iwata dedicated himself to finding books having to do with Japan. Iwata died in 1945 with only part of his work published, so Edogawa worked to have the remaining work on gay historiography published.

In the postwar period, a large number of Edogawa's books were made into films. The interest in using Edogawa's literature as a departure point for creating films has continued well after his death. Edogawa, who had a variety of health issues, including atherosclerosis and Parkinson's disease, died from a cerebral hemorrhage at his home in 1965. His grave is at the Tama Cemetery in Fuchu, near Tokyo.

The Edogawa Rampo Prize, named after him, is a Japanese literary award which has been presented every year by the Mystery Writers of Japan since 1955. The winner is given a prize of ¥10 million with publication rights by Kodansha.

== Works in English translation ==
Books

- Edogawa Rampo (1956), Japanese Tales of Mystery and Imagination, translated by James B. Harris. 14th ed. Rutland, VT: Charles E. Tuttle Company. ISBN 978-0-8048-0319-9.
- Edogawa Ranpo (1988), The Boy Detectives Club, translated by Gavin Frew. Tokyo: Kodansha. ISBN 978-4-0618-6037-7.
- Edogawa Rampo (2006), The Black Lizard and Beast in the Shadows, translated by Ian Hughes. Fukuoka: Kurodahan Press. ISBN 978-4-902075-21-2.
- Edogawa Rampo (2008), The Edogawa Rampo Reader, translated by Seth Jacobowitz. Fukuoka: Kurodahan Press. ISBN 978-4-902075-25-0. Contains many of Rampo's early short stories and essays.
- Edogawa Rampo (2009), Moju: The Blind Beast, translated by Anthony Whyte. Shinbaku Books. ISBN 978-1-84068-300-4.
- Edogawa Rampo (2012), The Fiend with Twenty Faces, translated by Dan Luffey. Fukuoka: Kurodahan Press. ISBN 978-4-902075-36-6.
- Edogawa Ranpo (2013), Strange Tale of Panorama Island, translated by Elaine Kazu Gerbert. Honolulu: University of Hawaiʻi Press. ISBN 978-0-8248-3703-7.
- Edogawa Rampo (2014), The Early Cases of Akechi Kogoro, translated by William Varteresian. Fukuoka: Kurodahan Press. ISBN 978-4-902075-62-5.
- Edogawa Rampo (2019), Gold Mask, translated by William Varteresian. Fukuoka: Kurodahan Press. ISBN 978-4-909473-06-6.
- Edogawa Ranpo (2020) The Hunter of the Grotesque: From the casebook of Akechi Kogoro, translated by Alexis J. Brown. Zakuro Books. ISBN 979-8-7578-6466-2.
- Edogawa Ranpo (2021) The Masquerade Ball: Edogawa Rampo: Master of Classic Japanese Mystery, Volume 1, translated by J.D. Wisgo. Kindle Edition.
- Edogawa Ranpo (2021) The Spider Man: From the casebook of Akechi Kogoro, translated by Alexis J. Brown. Zakuro Books. ISBN 979-8-7578-6880-6.
- Edogawa Ranpo (2022) The Demon of the Lonely Isle, translated by Alexis J. Brown. Independently published. ISBN 979-8-4154-6514-9.
- Edogawa Ranpo (2023) Japanese Gothic: Four twisted tales from Japan's master of the macabre, translated by Alexis J. Brown. Independently published. ISBN 979-8-3926-5592-2.
- Edogawa Ranpo (2022) The Conjurer: From the casebook of Akechi Kogoro, translated by Alexis J. Brown. Zakuro Books. ISBN 979-8-8432-7595-2.
- Edogawa Ranpo (2023) The Vampire: From the casebook of Akechi Kogoro, translated by Alexis J. Brown. Zakuro Books. ISBN 979-8-3873-0097-4.
- Edogawa Rampo (2024), The Human Leopard: From the Casebook of Akechi Kogoro, translated by Alexis J. Brown. Zakuro Books. ISBN 978-4-909473-06-6.
- Edogawa Rampo (2024), The Great Dark Room, Recorporations Press. ISBN 979-8-3043-3874-5.

Short stories

- Edogawa Ranpo (2008), "The Two-Sen Copper Coin," translated by Jeffrey Angles, Modanizumu: Modernist Fiction from Japan, 1913–1938, ed. William Tyler. Honolulu: University of Hawaiʻi Press. ISBN 978-0-8248-3242-1. pp. 270–89.
- Edogawa Ranpo (2008), "The Man Traveling with the Brocade Portrait," translated by Michael Tangeman, Modanizumu: Modernist Fiction from Japan, 1913–1938, ed. William Tyler. Honolulu: University of Hawaiʻi Press. ISBN 978-0-8248-3242-1. pp. 376–393.
- Edogawa Ranpo (2008), "The Caterpillar," translated by Michael Tangeman, Modanizumu: Modernist Fiction from Japan, 1913–1938, ed. William Tyler. Honolulu: University of Hawaiʻi Press. ISBN 978-0-8248-3242-1. pp. 406–422.
- Edogawa Ranpo (2022), "The Hundred-Faced Actor", translated by Lin King, Asymptote Journal, April 2022 issue
- Edogawa Ranpo (2024), "The Diary", translated by Erin Vastola, Asymptote Journal, 2024

== Major works ==
=== Private Detective Kogoro Akechi series ===
- Short stories which are available in English translation
  - "The Case of the Murder on D. Hill" (D坂の殺人事件, D-zaka no satsujin jiken; January 1925)
  - "The Psychological Test" (心理試験, Shinri Shiken; February 1925)
  - "The Black Hand Gang" (黒手組, Kurote-gumi; March 1925)
  - "The Ghost" (幽霊, Yūrei; May 1925)
  - "The Stalker in the Attic" (屋根裏の散歩者, Yaneura no Sanposha; August 1925)
- Short stories which have not been translated into English.
  - "Who" (何者, Nanimono; November 1929)
  - "The Murder Weapon" (兇器, Kyōki; June 1954)
  - "Moon and Gloves" (月と手袋, Tsuki to Tebukuro; April 1955)
- Novels which are available in English translation
  - The Dwarf (一寸法師, Issun-bōshi; 1926)
  - The Spider-Man (蜘蛛男, Kumo-Otoko; 1929)
  - The Edge of Curiosity-Hunting (猟奇の果, Ryōki no Hate; 1930)
  - The Conjurer (魔術師, Majutsu-shi; 1930)
  - The Vampire (吸血鬼, Kyūketsuki; 1930) First appearance of Kobayashi
  - The Golden Mask (黄金仮面, Ōgon-kamen; 1930)
  - The Black Lizard (黒蜥蜴, Kuro-tokage; 1934)
  - The Human Leopard (人間豹, Ningen-Hyō; 1934)
- Novels which have not been translated into English
  - The Devil's Crest (悪魔の紋章, Akuma no Monshō; 1937)
  - Dark Star (暗黒星, Ankoku-sei; 1939)
  - Hell's Clown (地獄の道化師, Jigoku no Dōkeshi; 1939)
  - Monster's Trick (化人幻戯, Kenin Gengi; 1954)
  - Shadow-Man (影男, Kage-otoko; 1955)
- Juvenile novels
  - The Fiend with Twenty Faces (nobel)]怪人二十面相 (Kaijin ni-jū Mensō, 1936)
  - The Boy Detectives Club (少年探偵団, Shōnen Tantei-dan; 1937)

=== Standalone mystery novels and novellas ===
- Novels which are available in English translation
  - Strange Tale of Panorama Island (パノラマ島奇談, Panorama-tō Kidan; 1926)
  - Beast in the Shadows (陰獣, Injū; 1928)
  - The Demon of the Lonely Isle (孤島の鬼, Kotō no Oni; 1929-30)
  - Moju: The Blind Beast (盲獣, Mōjū; 1931)
  - The Great Dark Room (大暗室, Dai Anshitsu; 1936)
  - Incident at the Lakeside Inn (湖畔亭事件, Kohan-tei Jiken; 1926)
- Novels which have not been translated into English
  - Struggle in the Dark (闇に蠢く, Yami ni Ugomeku; 1926-27)
  - The White-Haired Demon (白髪鬼, Hakuhatsu-ki; 1931-32)
  - A Glimpse Into Hell (地獄風景, Jigoku Fūkei; 1931-32)
  - The King of Terror (恐怖王, Kyōfu Ō; 1931-32)
  - Phantom Bug (妖虫, Yōchū; 1933-34)
  - Ghost Tower (幽霊塔, Yūrei tō; 1936) Based on the adaptation of the Meiji-period adaptation of Alice Muriel Williamson's A Woman in Grey by Ruikō Kuroiwa (黒岩涙香).
  - A Dream of Greatness (偉大なる夢, Idainaru Yume; 1943)
  - Crossroads (十字路, Jūjiro; 1955)
  - Petenshi to Kūki Otoko (ぺてん師と空気男; 1959)

=== Short stories ===
- Short stories which are available in English translation
  - "The Two-Sen Copper Coin" (二銭銅貨, Ni-sen Dōka; April 1923)
  - "Two Crippled Men" (二癈人, Ni Haijin; June 1924)
  - "The Twins" (双生児, Sōseiji; October 1924)
  - "The Red Chamber" (赤い部屋, Akai heya; April 1925)
  - "The Daydream" (白昼夢, Hakuchūmu; July 1925)
  - "Double Role" (一人二役, Hitori Futayaku; September 1925)
  - "The Human Chair" (人間椅子, Ningen Isu; October 1925)
  - "The Dancing Dwarf" (踊る一寸法師, Odoru Issun-bōshi; January 1926)
  - "Poison Weeds" (毒草, Dokusō; January 1926)
  - "The Masquerade Ball" (覆面の舞踏者, Fukumen no Butōsha; January–February 1926)
  - "The Martian Canals" (火星の運河, Kasei no Unga; April 1926)
  - "The Appearance of Osei" (お勢登場, Osei Tōjō; July 1926)
  - "The Hell of Mirrors" (鏡地獄, Kagami-jigoku; October 1926)
  - "A Brute's Love" (人でなしの恋, Hitodenashi no Koi; October 1926)
  - "The Caterpillar" (芋虫, Imomushi; January 1929)
  - "Insect" (虫, Mushi; Jun-July 1929)
  - "The Traveler with the Pasted Rag Picture" aka "The Man Traveling with the Brocade Portrait" (押絵と旅する男, Oshie to Tabi-suru Otoko; August 1929)
  - "Doctor Mera's Mysterious Crimes" (目羅博士の不思議な犯罪, Mera Hakase no Fushigi na Hanzai; April 1931)
  - "Pomegranate" (石榴, Zakuro; September 1934)
  - "The Cliff" (断崖, Dangai; March 1950)
  - "The Air Raid Shelter" (防空壕, Bōkūgō; July 1955)
  - "Finger" (指, Yubi; January 1960)
- Short stories which have not been translated into English
  - "One Ticket" (一枚の切符, Ichi-mai no Kippu; July 1923)
  - "A Frightful Mistake" (恐ろしき錯誤, Osoroshiki Sakugo; November 1923)
  - "The Diary" (日記帳, Nikkichō; March 1925)
  - "The Abacus Tells a Story of Love" (算盤が恋を語る話, Soroban ga Koi o Kataru Hanashi; March 1925)
  - "The Robbery" (盗難, Tōnan; May 1925)
  - "The Ring" (指環, Yubiwa; July 1925)
  - "The Sleepwalker's Death" (夢遊病者の死, Muyūbyōsha no Shi; July 1925)
  - "The Actor of a Hundred Faces" (百面相役者, Hyaku-mensō Yakusha; July 1925)
  - "Doubts" (疑惑, Giwaku; September–October 1925)
  - "Kiss" (接吻, Seppun; December 1925)
  - "Scattering Ashes" (灰神楽, Haikagura; March 1926)
  - "Monogram" (モノグラム, Monoguramu; July 1926)
  - "The Rocking-Horse's Canter" (木馬は廻る, Mokuba wa Mawaru; October 1926)
  - "Demon" (鬼, Oni; November 1931-February 1932)
  - "Matchlock" (火縄銃, Hinawajū; April 1932)
  - Horikoshi Sōsa Ikkachō-dono (堀越捜査一課長殿; April 1956)
  - "The Wife-Broken Man" (妻に失恋した男, Tsuma ni Shitsuren-shita Otoko; October–November 1957)

=== Adaptations of Western mystery novels ===
- Novels which are available in English translation
- Novels which have not been translated into English
  - The Demon in Green (緑衣の鬼, Ryokui no Oni; 1936) Adaptation of The Red Redmaynes by Eden Phillpotts
  - The Phantom's Tower (幽鬼の塔, Yūki no Tō; 1936) Adaptation of The Hanged Man of Saint-Pholien by Georges Simenon
  - Terror in the Triangle-Hall (三角館の恐怖, Sankaku-kan no kyōfu; 1951) Adaptation of Murder among the Angells by Roger Scarlett

=== Essays ===
- "The Horrors of Film" (1925)
- "Spectral Voices" (1926)
- "Confessions of Rampo" (1926)
- "The Phantom Lord" (1935)
- "A Fascination with Lenses" (1936)
- "My Love for the Printed Word" (1936)
- "Fingerprint Novels of the Meiji Era" (1950)
- "Dickens vs. Poe" (1951)
- "A Desire for Transformation" (1953)
- "An Eccentric Idea" (1954)

These ten essays are included in The Edogawa Rampo Reader.

== In popular culture ==
- Director Teruo Ishii's Horrors of Malformed Men from 1969 incorporates plot elements from a number of Ranpo stories. Noboru Tanaka filmed Watcher in the Attic as part of Nikkatsu's Roman porno series in 1976.
- The manga group CLAMP used Edogawa as one of the inspirations for the series Man of Many Faces (1990–1991).
- Akio Jissoji's films Watcher in the Attic (1992) and Murder on D Street (1998) are both adaptations of Ranpo's works. In both these movies Kogorō Akechi is played by actor Kyūsaku Shimada.
- In 1994, a film entitled Rampo inspired by Ranpo's works was released in Japan (The film was retitled The Mystery of Rampo for its American release). Ranpo, portrayed by Naoto Takenaka, is the lead character.
- The 1999 film Gemini by Shinya Tsukamoto is based on an Edogawa Ranpo story.
- Horror manga artists Kanako Inuki and Osada Not have illustrated adaptations of his stories.
- Some of Ranpo's stories were later turned into short films in the 2005 compilation Rampo Noir, starring the well-known actor Tadanobu Asano.
- Barbet Schroeder's 2008 film Inju: The Beast in the Shadow is an adaptation of Ranpo's 1928 short story.
- The horror manga artist Suehiro Maruo has adapted two of Ranpo's stories: The Strange Tale of the Panorama Island (2008) and "The Caterpillar" (2009).
- In 2009 the Japanese Google homepage displayed a logo commemorating his birthday on October 21.
- The manga and anime series Detective Conan (Meitantei Conan) has the main character's alias as 'Edogawa Conan', created from Sir Arthur Conan Doyle and Edogawa Ranpo's names. The detective that he lives with is called Mouri Kogoro, and Conan is part of a children's detective group called the Detective Boys (Shonen Tantei Dan); all apparent homages to the late Ranpo.
- The video game Persona 5 has a detective character named Goro Akechi, which is a reference to Ranpo's character Akechi Kogoro.
- The anime and manga Bungo Stray Dogs with characters inspired by popular Japanese authors, has a character named Edogawa Ranpo, who is an incredibly talented detective who solves crimes the police have trouble with, along with other mysteries. He has an ability called "Ultra Deduction", which allows him to deduce correct answers based on given information. He is also shown to have a close connection with Edgar Allan Poe.
- The last two episodes (10 and 11) of the 2013 Fuji Television (フジテレビ) series, The Case Files of Biblia Bookstore (ビブリア古書堂の事件手帖 Antiquarian Bookseller Biblia's Case Files), are constructed around two Edogawa Ranpo works, Boys Detective Club and The Man Traveling with the Brocade Portrait (translated as "The Traveler with the Pasted Rag Picture").
- The online game Bungou to Alchemist featured Ranpo as one of the writers the player can get. In the game, he is portrayed as an eccentric man who hates mainstream things and enjoys creating new tricks, non-malicious pranks, and ways to defeat the enemy.
- The 2015 anime Rampo Kitan: Game of Laplace was inspired by the works of Edogawa and commemorates the 50th anniversary of his death.
- The titles of the first 11 novels in Nisio Isin's Bishōnen Series parodies the titles of Ranpo's works. The 2021 anime adaptation incorporates this parody into its episode titles.
- The 2016 anime Trickster takes Ranpo's characters and sets them in the 2030s. An unusual twist is that Kobayashi is not a boy detective, but instead a character with a supernatural power that keeps him from being killed or dying - but that also keeps him isolated and longing for death.
- The Japanese heavy metal band Ningen Isu is named after the short story of the same name.
- Several of his works have been adapted or expanded upon by manga artist Junji Ito, including "The Human Chair" and "An Unearthly Love".
- The 2021 video game Lost Judgment features the character of Kyoko Amasawa, a teen girl detective and mystery enthusiast who names Edogawa as her favorite author. She also has a 'detective dog' named Ranpo, after the author. In the game, Ranpo is an intelligent Shiba Inu who finds clues by smell.
- The Japanese Vocaloid producer teniwoha references Ranpo and attributes the line "someday, even artificial flowers will bear fruit", otherwise translated as "even artificial flowers can bear the sweetest of fruit" to him in their song "villain", which discusses transitioning and gender dysphoria.

== See also ==
- Japanese literature
- Japanese detective fiction
- Japanese horror
- Mystery Writers of Japan
- Edogawa Rampo Prize
- Detective Conan

== Secondary sources ==
- Leigh Blackmore "Edogawa Rampo and The Red Chamber". Essay (liner notes) in Edogawa Rampo, The Red Chamber, vinyl LP, Cadabra Records (2022).
- Angles, Jeffrey (2011), Writing the Love of Boys: Origins of Bishōnen Culture in Modernist Japanese Literature. Minneapolis: University of Minnesota Press. ISBN 978-0-8166-6970-7.
- Jacobowitz, Seth (2008), Introduction to The Edogawa Rampo Reader. Fukuoka: Kurodahan Press. ISBN 978-4-902075-25-0.
- Kawana, Sari (2008), Murder Most Modern: Detective Fiction and Japanese Culture. Minneapolis: University of Minnesota Press. ISBN 978-0-8166-5025-5.
- Silver, Mark (2008), Purloined Letters: Cultural Borrowing and Japanese Crime Literature, 1868-1937. Honolulu: University of Hawaiʻi Press. ISBN 978-0-8248-3188-2.
