= Koikuchi shirt =

Koikuchi shirt (鯉口シャツ) is a type of Japanese silk shirt. The term koi-kuchi, carp mouth, refers to the shape of neck.

The koi-kuchi (carp's mouth) shape is also found on other designs in Japan, notably the carp's mouth fitting on a Katana or samurai sword, and the rounded, open lips of carp's mouth Kitoku masks in dance.
