= Rampo (film) =

- Film poster
- Directed by: Rintaro Mayuzumi; Kazuyoshi Okuyama
- Written by: Yuhei Enoki; Kazuyoshi Okuyama
- Produced by: Kazuyoshi Okuyama
- Starring: Masahiro Motoki; Naoto Takenaka; Michiko Hada
- Cinematography: Fujio Morita; Yasushi Sasakibara
- Edited by: Toshio Taniguchi; Akimasa Kawashima
- Music by: Masahiro Kawasaki; Akira Senju (international version)
- Distributed by: Shochiku
- Release date: June 25, 1994 (Japan)
- Running time: 100 minutes
- Country: Japan
- Language: Japanese

Rampo (Japanese: らんぽ, Hepburn: Ranpo) is a 1994 Japanese film based on the stories of Edogawa Rampo. It was released in the United States by The Samuel Goldwyn Company as The Mystery of Rampo. Originally shot by Rintaro Mayuzumi, the director had a falling out with producer Okuyama who then reshot much of the film and added many of the surreal elements.

== Plot ==
In an animated introduction a man hides in a nagamochi while playing hide and seek with neighboring children, but he is locked in and can hardly breathe. When his wife comes home he manages to make a noise and she opens the lid to the trunk, and instead shuts it again.

We then enter a live action world where Poe-inspired mystery writer Edogawa Rampo (Naoto Takenaka) has written a book about a woman who has killed her husband by locking him in a nagamochi. The book is banned by the government who claim the work to be too disturbing. He is asked to burn his manuscript. However, after burning his paper drafts, his publisher shows him a newspaper story with an account of events just like his forbidden story. After spying on the woman concerned, who is labeled as a murderer, he decides to visit her store. Shizuko (Michiko Hada) offers him her own music box for free as he showed interest in it. He later stalks her to a shrine where he admits following her and she asks him to go away. She later asks him to meet her at the shrine. She's sorry and has read his book and was impressed while he again excuses for his stalking behaviour. She is then picked up by a taxi and he avidly follows her with another taxi.

Here his younger literary alter ego Kogoro Akechi (Masahiro Motoki) picks up the story:

Akechi finds out Shizuko has an affair with a marquis in a Dracula-like castle located at the sea on a cliff. He decides to pay this duke a secret visit by "experimenting" with parachute jumping. He lands in a pack of biting hunting dogs the duke directs at him. The duke sucks out his arm wound and then invites him home to treat the wound. They have dinner together and here he sees Shizuko serving him an aphrodisiac. Akeshi observes the marquis while he's horse-riding, cross-dressing and smearing his facial make up all over her naked back and projecting a stag film on her body.

During an evening party he frightens the guests with a recital of a text of Poe - accompanied with images of war: the film gets stuck at the end of the text, burning the film depicting the face of a corpse. The next day he follows with another piece of "entertainment" by committing suicide with his white horse, running off the cliff.

Edogawa Rampo returns to the story as he finds out about the castle and tries to enter the room where Akeshi is willingly - he needs no instructions from his writer - entering the nagamochi Shizuko has opened from him. As Rampo navigates through the castle the layers of fantasy and reality start to merge into one cosmic flashback occurring before and after he gets into the room where Shizuko commits suicide before Akeshi can get out of the nagamochi. Rampo holds Shizuko in his arms.

== Cast ==
- Masahiro Motoki as Kogorô Akechi
- Naoto Takenaka as Edogawa Rampo
- Michiko Hada as Shizuko
- Teruyuki Kagawa as Seishi Yokomizo
- Mikijirô Hira as Marquis Ogawara
- Shirô Sano as Officer
- Ittoku Kishibe as Cafe Owner
- Nekohachi Edoya as Antique Shop Owner
- Jun'ichi Takagi as Fujimori
- Charlie Yutani as Driver
- Kirin Kiki as House Wife/Head of Maid
- Julie Dreyfus as Mademoiselle
- Yoshio Harada as Big Star
- Kinji Fukasaku as Film Director
- Hiroshi Abe as Singer
- Genjirô Arato as Producer
- Tetsuya Bessho as Still Photographer
- Tetsuya Chikushi
- Yû Hayami as Fiance
- Masaya Katô as Waiter at Hotel
- Maiko Kikuchi as Actress
- Kazuya Kimura as Actor
- Tomokazu Miura as Producer Tagawa
- Kenji Ôtsuki as Taxi Driver
- Akiko Santô as Countess
- Kôji Wakamatsu

== Soundtrack ==
Masahiro Kawasaki composed the score for the Japanese version of the film, while Akira Senju composed the international version's soundtrack. Senju's soundtrack for the international release was released on CD by Warner Brothers, on their Discovery label, in 1995. The music was performed by the Czech Philharmonic Orchestra.

== Video game adaptation ==
A video game based on the film was released for Sega Saturn in 1995.

On release, Famicom Tsūshin scored the game a 26 out of 40, giving it a 7 out of 10 in their Reader Cross Review.
