= The Human Chair =

Short story by Edogawa Ranpo

"The Human Chair" (人間椅子, Ningen-isu) is a short story by Japanese author and critic Edogawa Ranpo. It was published in the October 1925 edition of the literature magazine Kuraku (苦楽).

== Plot ==
After seeing her husband off to work, the young author identified only as Yoshiko sets off to read the large collection of letters she received from other young authors. These are often letters containing samples of their work for critique. One large envelope contains a letter.

The letter-writer does not provide his name. The letter is a confession of crimes. The letter-writer has no family or friends, and claims to be "ugly beyond description". He is a chair maker and loves his work and all the chairs he creates, even going so far as to claim some sort of intangible connection to his work.

One day, after completing a luxurious sofa commissioned for the lobby of a new hotel, he realized that it was his masterpiece. Reluctant to part with it, he reshaped the inner structure of the sofa to allow one human being to sit inside of it. Inside the sofa, he packed enough food and water for a few days. After instructing his assistant to organize the pickup of the sofa, he climbs inside. The sofa is then transported to the lobby of the hotel.

Over the next few days, he stayed in the sofa during the mornings and afternoons. It is during these times that he had his only interactions with the people who chose to sit on the sofa. They are often affluent visitors. He becomes very familiar with those people who stay there regularly. He even claims to be able to recognize people simply from the weight and shape of their bodies, as well as their smell. He confesses that often he has found himself falling in love with some of the women who sit on him. He repositions his body beneath them to make them comfortable, reveling in the comments people make on the extraordinary comfort and luxury of the sofa.

At night, however, he exits the sofa and engages in truly criminal activity. At night when the lobby is closed and the guests are sleeping, he crawls out of the sofa and burglarizes the rooms of the guests of the hotel. He claims to have amassed a large fortune due to these extra activities and has extended his stay from a few days into several months.

After several months of living in the sofa, he learned that the hotel was put under new management. The new administrators demanded a more frugal and Japanese aesthetic for the hotel, to make it more affordable. The sofa was auctioned off and relocated into the home of a Japanese political official. In this part of his letter, he admits that he has fallen in love with the wife of this official. This new woman is a fan of literature and often reads on his sofa. He has become familiar with this woman like no other before her. As a privately owned sofa, he now has intimate knowledge of his owner.

He begins to describe in detail the woman, the house she lives in, and her husband. Horrified, Yoshiko realizes that the woman he describes in the letter must be her. At the end of the letter, the writer requests that Yoshiko allow him to meet her. She can signal her acceptance by leaving a lit candle out at night. In terror, Yoshiko jumps off the sofa and runs to the other side of the house. As she contemplates the situation, her maid delivers the daily mail to her. She finds a letter addressed from the same chair maker. In the letter, he tells her that the previous letter was nothing but a manuscript of a sample of his work, based on pure imagination and the knowledge that she had recently purchased that particular sofa. He then requests a response. In the final line of his letter, he states that he intends to title the story "The Human Chair".

== Characters ==
Yoshiko (佳子)
Yoshiko is a young and already well-respected author in Japanese literature. She daily receives letters from other aspiring young authors asking for her criticisms and opinions of their work. One day, she receives a strange letter from the couch maker.

I (私)
Author of the letter sent to Yoshiko. A self-proclaimed master chair and couch maker, he claims to be ugly if not physically deformed in some way. He uses the letter to Yoshiko to confess his crimes. In the end, however, he turns out to be an aspiring author, and his letter is nothing but the manuscript of a short story of his own writing.

== Adaptations ==
Toshiyuki Mizutani adapted the story as a movie in 1997.

It was also adapted into a manga by Junji Ito. This short story is a sequel in which Ito re-imagines the ending of Ranpo's tale.
