= Onmyōji =

Japanese court diviner position

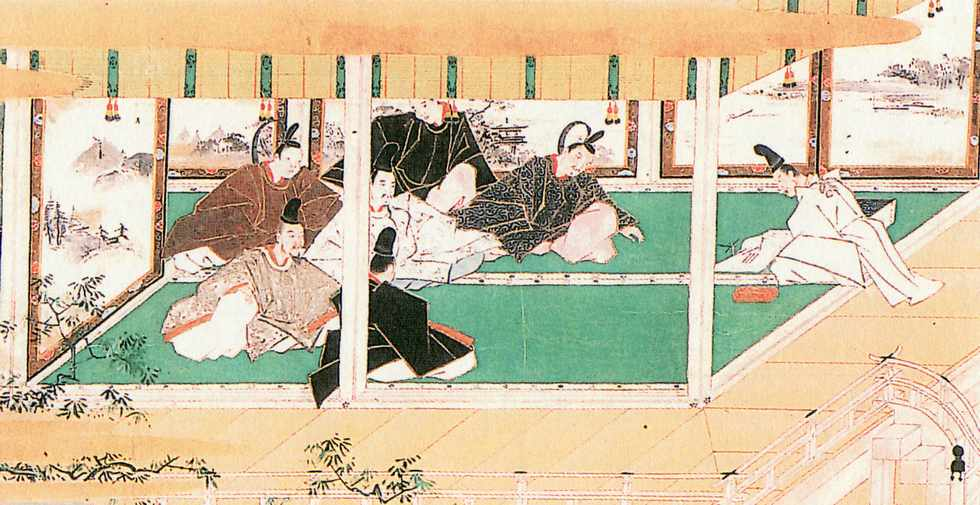
From the Nara picture book "Tamamo-no-Mae," published in the early Edo period, depicting an onmyōji performing divination with counting rods. From the collection of the Kyoto University Library.

Onmyōji (Japanese: 陰陽師; literally: yin-and-yang master) was one of the official positions belonging to the Bureau of Onmyō of the Ministry of the Center under the ritsuryō system in ancient Japan, and was assigned as a technical officer in charge of divination and geomorphology based on the theory of the yin-and-yang five phases. In the Middle Ages and early modern period, the term was used to refer to those who performed prayers and divination in the private sector, and some of them were regarded as a kind of clergy.

== History ==
=== Introduction of the yin-and-yang five phases philosophy and the establishment of the Bureau of Onmyō ===
Based on the ancient Chinese concept of yin and yang and five phases, which began in the Xia and Shang dynasties and was almost completed in the Zhou dynasty, that all phenomena are based on the combination of yin-and-yang five phases of wood, fire, earth, metal, and water, onmyōji is a uniquely Japanese profession that is responsible for astrology, calendar, I Ching, water clock, etc., which are closely related to this concept. The yin-and-yang five phases philosophy itself, which is the premise of this system, is thought to have come directly from mainland China (the Northern and Southern dynasties or earlier) or via the western part of the Korean Peninsula (Goguryeo and Baekje) during the Asuka period, or at the latest by the time the Five Classics doctors came to Japan from Baekje in 512 or the I Ching doctors came to Japan in 554.

At first, the influence of these studies on politics and culture was minimal. However, in 602, Gwalleuk came to Japan from Baekje and taught various studies, including the yin-and-yang five phases, to 34 selected officials, including Prince Shōtoku. As a result, an official calendar was adopted in Japan for the first time, and Japanese missions to Sui China was launched in 607 to absorb Buddha's teachings, yin-and-yang five phases philosophies, and the calendar system. In addition, the influence of yin-and-yang five phases philosophies became apparent in the establishment of Prince Shōtoku's seventeen-article constitution and the Twelve Level Cap and Rank System. Thereafter, the Imperial court continued to send international students to accompany Japanese missions to Sui China (later Japanese missions to Tang China) and invited many monks and scholars from mainland China or the west coast of the Korean Peninsula to further absorb knowledge. As the introduction of various schools of thought progressed, Japan came to believe that it was important to consider the movements and positions of the Chinese constellations, to determine the good and bad fortune, disasters and fortune based on the principle of compatibility of birth and death, to divine the future, and to obtain guidelines for all personnel matters.

Later, Emperor Tenmu was such a master of astrology and fugue that he took his own divination tools and told fortunes during the Jinshin War. He also had a deep knowledge of the yin-and-yang five phases philosophy, which led to the establishment of the Bureau of Onmyō and Japan's first observatory in 676, and the use of the term "onmyōji" in 685, which further increased the popularity of the yin-and-yang five phases philosophy. In 718, the Yōrō Code established the Bureau of Onmyō as an internal department of the Ministry of Center, and when it was stipulated that the positions of Doctor of Astrology, Doctor of Onmyō, onmyōji, Doctor of Calendar, and Doctor of Water Clock should be permanently assigned as technical officers, the Bureau of Onmyō became officially in charge of divination along with the turtle shell diviners who belonged to the Department of Divinities.

In the Bureau of Onmyō, a four-grade governmental system was established, with a Head of Onmyō at the top, administrative officers below him, and technical officers such as doctors, trainees, and other general staff. However, since the technical officers, such as doctors and onmyōji, were in charge of technology that had been introduced from the continent, they were appointed by foreigners who were well versed in academics and skilled in reading Classical Chinese texts, especially monks who had come from the Han dynasty and the Sui dynasty in mainland China, as well as from Goguryeo and Baekje, which had power on the west coast of the Korean Peninsula, and rarely from Silla, which initially had power on the east coast of the Korean Peninsula. In particular, around the time of the defeat of the Baekje dynasty in the Battle of Baekgang in 663, when Japan sent reinforcements to Baekje, a close ally of Japan, and Silla unified the Korean Peninsula, a large number of knowledgeable people from Baekje came to Japan as exiles, and many of them were appointed to the bureau. It was also possible to appoint technical officers from the civilian population.

When the Bureau of Onmyō was first established, the technical officers' duties were purely limited to I Ching, geomorphology (like what we call "feng shui" today), astronomical observation, astrology, making calendars, judging good days and bad days, and keeping time with water clocks. They did not perform any religious rituals or spells like the Department of Divinities or monks. However, they played an important role in the relocation of the capital by selecting good days for repairs and predicting the good and bad fortune of the land and its direction.

Of the technical officers assigned to the Bureau of Onmyō, the onmyōji who specialized in I Ching and geomorphology can be defined as "onmyōji in the narrow sense," and all the technical officers, including Doctor of Astrology, Doctor of Onmyō, onmyōji, Doctor of Calendar, and Doctor of Water Clock, as "onmyōji in the broad sense." After this, this group of onmyōji in the broad sense was sometimes referred to as "onmyōdō."

=== Changes in the treatment of onmyōji under the ritsuryō system ===
Under the ritsuryō system, it was strictly forbidden for any outsider (not only priests and monks, but also all government officials and private citizens) to study astrology, yin and yang, calendars, and time management, and to preach about disasters and good omens, except for those who were appointed as trainees at the Bureau of Onmyō. Any equipment related to astronomical observation or time measurement, or books related to onmyōdō was also forbidden to be taken out of the Bureau of Onmyō, and even forbidden to be simply owned by private individuals. For this reason, until the beginning of the Heian period (early 9th century), when the ritsuryō system was relatively strictly enforced, onmyōdō was managed as classified information monopolized by the Bureau of Onmyō. Thereafter, to keep up with the trends of the times, laws and regulations were often issued to revise the details of the ritsuryō system, and as the number of government positions in each ministry tended to increase, the number of positions in the Bureau of Onmyō was also increased considerably by the middle of the Heian period.

In general, the court rank of the technical officers in each ministry was set low, but the rank of the technical officers in the Bureau of Onmyō was set higher than that of the technical officers in other ministries. However, since the Bureau of Onmyō was an internal bureau of the Ministry of Center, the rank of the fourth grade administrative officials was naturally lower than that of the main ministry, and only a Head of Onmyō allowed to ascend to the hall of the Seiryōden, the place of daily life of the Emperor, to report directly.

In the beginning, the fourth class officials and the technical officials, the doctors and onmyōji, were appointed strictly separately, and the latter were appointed by the learned monks who came from the advanced countries of China and Korea. This was because it was impossible for the Imperial court, which was a secular government, to allow monks to serve freely because of the way they were treated. The reason for this was that it was necessary to return monks appointed as doctors or onmyōji to the secular world by Imperial decree before they could be appointed as administrative officials, and such decree should not be issued frequently. As a substitute, secular personnel were appointed as students of astrology, onmyōdō, and calendars to learn the various arts of onmyōdō and to cultivate personnel who could serve and work freely at the Imperial court. Later, this practice gradually became more ambiguous, and it became possible for a learned monk to be appointed as a technical official without returning to secular life, and to be transferred to a higher position (especially as a Head or Vice Head) or be ordered to serve concurrently as an administrative official. However, to raise the rank of a technical officer, who was basically a learned monk who did not return to the secular world, it was not possible to raise the rank of a technical officer without changing the position of technical officer according to the rank equivalent system, which was the basis of the ritsuryō system. In addition, as the training of trainees progressed, more and more secular bureaucrats became technical officers, and personnel exchanges became even more free. In any case, there were many transfers and concurrent appointments from technical officers to administrative officers in the Bureau of Onmyō. A Head of Onmyō, namely a director of the Bureau of Onmyō, was also a former technical official and many technical officials held concurrent positions in the Bureau of Onmyō. The Bureau of Onmyō became a technical government office from the Nara period to the early Heian period.

However, with the abolition of Japanese missions to Tang China after 838, (Note: There is a theory that 894 was the last mission to Tang China, but the prevailing theory is that the ambassador, Sugawara no Michizane, requested that the mission be cancelled and he was not actually sent.) the opportunity to invite talented foreigners from the Tang dynasty in mainland China was lost (unified Silla on the Korean Peninsula was not as close as it once was with Baekje). As a result of continuing to train technical officers in a closed manner by limiting the number of trainees to only 30, in the early Heian period, there was gradually a scarcity of human resources for technical officers at the Bureau of Onmyō. In addition, there was a shortage of positions due to the intensifying struggle for power among the nobles. A Head of Onmyō, who was the only man in the Bureau of Onmyō who had direct access to the Emperor, was not appointed from the ranks of technical officers such as doctors, but was used more and more as a position of the nobles. Since it was the last position in the directorate, it tended to be used as a treatment for noblemen who were in relatively poor circumstances. From this period onward, there was a particularly large number of assignments outside the capacity of the bureau, and these assignments became permanent. This was no longer a part of the consideration for monks, but was simply for the purpose of assigning positions to nobles.

In the middle of the Heian period (10th century), the monopolistic succession of two families, the Kamo family and the Abe family (see below), was seen, and the top positions in the Bureau of Onmyō, including a Head of Onmyō, were almost exclusively held by members of these two families. In addition, the onmyōdō practices of the two families became more religious than the original governmental positions, and these practices were heavily used by the Imperial Regents, Chief Imperial Advisors, and other officials of the Imperial court. As a result, the two families were promoted to more senior positions beyond the official rank of the Bureau of Onmyō in the ritsuryō system, even though they were in reality only practitioners of onmyōdō. In the Muromachi period, the Abe family in particular, under the patronage of Ashikaga Yoshimitsu, the third shogun of the Ashikaga shogunate, rose to become hanke as one of superior nobilities, which was always appointed as the senior government positions, and changed its name to the Tsuchimikado family. The Tsuchimikado family temporarily declined from the late Muromachi period to the Sengoku period, but in the early modern period, the Tokugawa shogunate gave the Tsuchimikado family the right to manage all onmyōji in Japan, and the Tsuchimikado family prospered until the beginning of the Meiji era.

=== Onmyōdō as a religion and the deification of onmyōji in the Heian period ===
After the assassination of Fujiwara no Tanetsugu in 785, the Emperor Kanmu was frightened by a vengeful spirit of Prince Sawara, his younger brother, due to the frequent incidents of personal disasters and mourning. The relocation of the capital from Nagaoka-kyō to Heian-kyō (present-day Kyoto) by him triggered a sudden spread of belief in noble ghost to appease vengeful spirits, especially in the Imperial court, and the tendency to seek more powerful benefits from spellcasting to dispel evil spirits became stronger. Against this backdrop, in addition to the ancient Shintoism, religious beliefs in the stars and Taoist spells, such as those using sacred symbols, came to be the focus of attention. Doctor of Spellcasting and spellcasters were in charge of spellcasting, which had elements of prophecy, Taoism, Buddhism, and especially esotericism, and belonged to the Bureau of Pharmacy of the Ministry of the Imperial Household, which had been established as an institution to offer prayers as medical treatment. However, Fujiwara no Kamatari, who was a researcher of onmyōdō, abolished them, and they were integrated into the Bureau of Onmyō. In this way, onmyōdō began to have elements of various colors, from Taoism or Buddhism (especially esoteric Buddhism introduced in the Nara and Heian periods (end of the 8th century)), astrology called sukuyōdō, which was introduced along with them, to ancient Shintoism. With the advent of the noble ghost faith, the onmyōdō became even more diverse. For example, spells such as changing the direction for good fortune and self-consecration, rituals such as the Festival of the Great Emperor of the Sacred Mountain of the East, and Uho steps (hempai), which were often seen in onmyōdō practices, originated from Taoism, and rice scattering and liturgical incantations originated from ancient Shinto. Furthermore, in the process of the Hokke of the Fujiwara clan's expansion and establishment of power in the Imperial court, political conflicts among nobles intensified, and there were many occasions when onmyōdō was used for slander and defamation aimed at the downfall of rival forces.

This trend became more pronounced with the rise of Fujiwara no Yoshifusa during the reigns of Emperors Ninmyō and Montoku (in the middle of the 9th century). Emperor Uda himself was well versed in the art of I Ching, and Fujiwara no Morosuke even wrote his own books "Kujō Dono Ikai" and "Kujō Nenchū Gyōji," and presented a guide that incorporated many taboos and manners based on the yin-and-yang philosophy. This environment produced charismatic onmyōji such as Shigeoka no Kawahito and Yuge no Koreo, and also led to the introduction of a regnal year following disasters as predicted by the Chinese classics scholar Miyoshi Kiyotsura, which became a regular event after 901. As a result, onmyōdō became more and more important to the Imperial court. In addition, the fact that people outside the Bureau of Onmyō, such as Fujiwara no Morosuke and Miyoshi Kiyotsura, had mastered astrology, onmyōdō, I Ching, and calendars shows that the classified information policy under the ritsuryō system, which prohibited the leakage of onmyōdō outside the Bureau of Onmyō, had already practically failed by this time.

After the middle of the Heian period, the ritsuryō system was further loosened due to the monopolization of politics by Imperial Regents and Chief Imperial Advisors, and the spread of the manor system. As a result, informal onmyōji, who were not regular government officials and belonged to the Bureau of Onmyō, began to privately associate with the nobles, divining their good and bad fortune, and secretly performing rituals to ward off evil. In some cases, they would even undertake to kill their opponents with curses. Even among the official onmyōji who belonged to the Bureau of Onmyō, there were many who followed this trend. Their behavior was far removed from the duties of onmyōji as originally stipulated by the ritsuryō system. The onmyōji arbitrarily imposed good and bad fortune on the Emperor, Imperial family, senior government positions, and nobles in relation to the fortunate directions, and the movements of the stars, and even entered into the management of their private lives. As onmyōji began to control the spiritual world at the center of the Imperial court, they gradually went beyond their regular duties under the governmental system and began to work behind the scenes of the government. At the same time, there appeared Kamo no Tadayuki and his son, Kamo no Yasunori, as well as their disciple, Abe no Seimei, who were onmyōji well versed in all aspects of astrology, onmyōdō and calendars. They defied precedent and were promoted to even higher ranks, earning the trust of the Imperial court. Kamo no Yasunori taught calendar to his son Kamo no Mitsuyoshi and astrology to his disciple Abe no Seimei. They passed on these knowledge and skills only to the children of their own families and forbade teaching them to others. The astrology of the Abe family took on the nature of preaching disasters and good omens, while the calendars of the Kamo family took on a strong astrological flavor. For this reason, only the Kamo and Abe families produced onmyōji. When Abe no Seimei's grandson, Abe no Akichika, became the Head of Onmyō, he expressed his policy of always appointing people from the Kamo family as Doctor of Calendar and people from the Abe family as Doctor of Astrology. After that, the two families almost monopolized other positions in the Bureau of Onmyō that were not originally meant to be inherited by the two families. In addition, even though their actual status was that of onmyōji, they came to hold other higher official positions beyond the duties of the Bureau of Onmyō, and the bureau as a governmental system became a complete skeleton. The onmyōji became a charismatic spiritual ruler in the Imperial court with a strong tinge of religious spells and rituals, and came to wield a powerful influence. From the middle of the Heian period onward, onmyōji had a great influence on the central government of the Imperial court, from political management and personnel decisions to the abdication of the Emperor. Onmyōji were also deeply involved in the 901 incident in which Fujiwara no Tokihira, the Minister of the Left, relegated Sugawara no Michizane from the position of Minister of the Right to the position of deputy commissioner of Dazaifu, the regional government in Chikuzen Province.

It was also around this time that many onmyōji began to be seen in local areas outside of Heian-kyō, the capital at the time, although their activities as onmyōji outside of the Bureau of Onmyō were originally prohibited by the ritsuryō system. In the local areas, many private onmyōji appeared, including the Reverend Dōma (well known as Ashiya Dōman).

Throughout the middle and latter half of the Heian period (11th to 12th centuries), the Abe family produced many masters in astrology, which was the most difficult of all the duties of the Bureau of Onmyō, and the Abe family always succeeded as a Head of Onmyō, while the Kamo family succeeded as a Vice Head of Onmyō. At the time of the Genpei War at the end of the Heian period, Abe no Yasuchika, the grandson of Abe no Yoshihira, the son of Abe no Seimei, and Abe no Suehiro, the son of Abe no Yasuchika, held particularly high official ranks. However, due to the loss of political power that accompanied the subsequent transfer of power to the Kamakura shogunate, the turmoil within the Abe family caused by the struggle for power between the Northern and Southern Courts at the end of the Kamakura period, and the subsequent disorder during the Nanboku-chō period, the power of the Abe family temporarily declined.

=== The rise of samurai society and the fall of the official onmyōji ===
At the end of the Heian period (the latter half of the 12th century), the Heike clan, which originated from the Imperial guard of Cloistered Emperor, who were highly respected during the cloistered rule, rose to prominence, and the Minamoto clan, which had defeated the Heike clan, led to the rise of the samurai society. In 1192, the Kamakura shogunate, a samurai government, was officially established. From the time of the Genpei War, the existence of onmyōji was essential for both clans to establish their code of conduct. For this reason, the Kamakura shogunate also tended to emphasize onmyōdō. From the time when Minamoto no Yoritomo, the founder of the shogunate, went to war to seize power, he chose auspicious days predicted by onmyōji when deciding on actions to be taken in the early years of the shogunate. The 2nd shogun, Minamoto no Yoriie, followed his father's example by inviting an onmyōji from the capital. However, his personal life was not influenced by an onmyōji, and he used them only to supplement the formality of official events.

After the assassination of Minamoto no Sanetomo, the third shogun of the Kamakura shogunate, in 1219, the regency government of the Hōjō clan began to develop. The shoguns of the Kamakura shogunate came to be invited by the Imperial Regents and Chief Imperial Advisors of each generation and the Imperial family as puppets of the regent, the Hōjō clan. Since the shoguns of the Kamakura shogunate were originally from the Imperial family, they naturally made heavy use of onmyōji. The fourth shogun of the Kamakura shogunate, Kujō Yoritsune, received a request from the cabinet for a policy to draw an irrigation canal from the Tama River system as a public works and use it to secure drinking water and develop paddy field after the development of wetlands in Musashi Province (present-day Metropolis and Saitama Prefecture) had been completed. The area to be developed was located directly north of Kamakura, the capital of the Kamakura shogunate, but an onmyōji judged the location to be in the direction of misfortune. Therefore, Kujō Yoritsune deliberately relocated his residence to another residence of Adachi Yoshikage (present-day Tsurumi Ward, Yokohama City, Kanagawa Prefecture), which was considered to be in a fortunate direction from Kamakura (a "change to a fortunate direction" in onmyōdō), and then ordered the start of construction. Thereafter, the shoguns of the Kamakura shogunate did not invite onmyōji from Heian-kyō, but instead they had a group of onmyōji close at hand that came to be known as the "powerful onmyōdō." Later, during the Jōkyū War, the Imperial court had onmyōji of the Bureau of Onmyō and the Kamakura shogunate had the uprising onmyōji perform prayers. Especially for the shoguns of the middle and late Kamakura period, onmyōji was an indispensable presence.

However, only those in the vicinity of the shoguns who came from the Imperial family or nobles were enthusiastic about onmyōdō, and the Hōjō clan, the regent who had actual power, was not necessarily particular about onmyōdō. In addition to that, from the samurai under the shoguns to the samurai in the various regions of Japan, they were not aware of the formalities of the Imperial court, nor were they in the habit of consulting onmyōji on the code of conduct. Because of this, onmyōji did not have the spiritual influence to control the entirety of samurai society, and their presence was limited to the world of puppet shoguns from the Imperial family and nobles, and the Imperial court, senior government positions, and nobles who had lost their political authorities. In the early Kamakura period, the constables and governors of the Kamakura shogunate did not have much influence over the Imperial territories and noble manors. However, from the middle of the Kamakura period onward, when the efficiency of tax revenue in the territories and manors, and sometimes the territories and manors themselves, began to be rapidly eroded by the constables and governors, the power of the Imperial court and nobles, which were the support base of onmyōji, began to suffer economically.

The Kamakura shogunate was overthrown by an Imperial decree of Emperor Go-Daigo, but Ashikaga Takauji broke away from him to establish the Ashikaga shogunate and usher in the Northern and Southern courts period. The Ashikaga shogunate, which had established its shogunate in Heian-kyō and supported the Northern Court, gradually adopted a nobleman-like orientation. From the time of Ashikaga Yoshimitsu, the third shogun of the Ashikaga shogunate, onmyōji came to be heavily used again. He planned to monopolize the authority of the Emperor, and some believe that the heavy use of onmyōji was also intended to deprive the Emperor of his right to perform rituals at the Imperial court.

Of the two families that inherited onmyōdō, during the Northern and Southern courts period, the Kamo family took the name of the Kadenokōji family after Kadenokōji, (Note: It is different from the Hino family of the Hokke of the Fujiwara clan and the Kadenokōji family of the Shiba clan of the Seiwa Genji clan.) where their residence was located, and Kamo (Kadenokōji) Akikata was active in writing his own book "Rekirin Mondō Shū." However, in the middle of the Muromachi period, the successor to the head of the mainline Hōjo family was murdered, leading to the breakup of the family line and the gradual decline of the family's power. On the other hand, the Abe family was successful, and Abe no Ariyo (the 14th descendant of Abe no Seimei) took advantage of the patronage of the shogun, Ashikaga Yoshimitsu, to obtain a senior government position. The fact that onmyōji, who were feared and shunned in the court at the time because of their duties, became one of senior government positions was a groundbreaking event that caused a sensation. From the son of Abe no Ariyo, Abe no Arimori, to Abe no Arisue and Abe no Arinobu, successive generations were promoted to senior government positions, and the Abe family, originally a middle-class noble, rose to the status of hanke. In the generation of Abe no Arinobu (16th century), he seized the opportunity of the breakup of the Kadenokōji family to monopolize the duties related to both astrology and calendars for the next five generations. Since the residence of the head of the family had been located in Tsuchimikado after Abe no Ariyo, the Abe family changed its name to the Tsuchimikado family. (Note: Like the Kamo family, which took the name "Kadenokōji" from the name of a place, it is different from the Tsuchimikado family of the Minamoto no Michichika lineage, which follows the Murakami Genji clan.) The Tsuchimikado family had gained the support of both the Imperial court and Muromachi shogunate, and up to this point, it seemed to have perfected its power as an onmyōji.

However, the political power of the Ashikaga shogunate did not last long, and from the middle of the Muromachi period onward, all the shogun's deputies, with the exception of the Hosokawa clan, declined. The Ashikaga shogunate became more like a coalition government of powerful constables than a shogunate control, which led to factional struggles and frequent wars such as the Ōnin War. In addition, as the transition from constables to sengoku magnates and the tendency for deputy constables and samurais in each region to conquer each other spread, they became desperate to survive. Onmyōdō, which had been used formally as a complement, became less important. A succession of wars and the tyranny of the sengoku magnates led to the destruction of Heian-kyō, the seat of the Imperial court that had been the protector of the onmyōdō, and the shoguns of the Muromachi shogunate, which was located in the capital, often fled. In the first half of the 16th century, Tsuchimikado Arinobu evacuated his territory, which he had never visited in peacetime, to Notaoi, Natashō, Wakasa Province. Three generations of the Tsuchimikado family, Tsuchimikado Arinobu, his son Tsuchimikado Ariharu, and his grandson Tsuchimikado Arinaga, were appointed as the Head of Onmyō. However, they rarely served in Heian-kyō and remained in Wakasa Province to perform various rituals, including the festival of the Great Emperor of the Sacred Mountain of the East. As a result, the Imperial court was baffled and had no choice but to summon Kadenokōji Aritomi, a member of the Kadenokōji clan, to report on various matters. In this way, the operation of the Bureau of Onmyō became extremely unnatural. Later, as the Toyotomi clan established its power through the Oda clan, Toyotomi Hideyoshi, the Chief Imperial Advisor Emeritus, ostracized his adopted son, Toyotomi Hidetsugu, and had him disemboweled. Tsuchimikado Hisanaga, son of Tsuchimikado Arinaga, was blamed for undertaking a prayer service for Toyotomi Hidetsugu and was exiled to Owari Province. Furthermore, Toyotomi Hideyoshi suppressed a large number of onmyōji. Therefore, the position of the Head of Onmyō and below became practically vacant, and onmyōji did not operate in the center of the Toyotomi administration. The onmyōdō that had existed since the Heian period completely lost its reality.

With the complete collapse of the ritsuryō system and the suppression of Toyotomi Hideyoshi, the onmyōji as an official position in the Bureau of Onmyō lost its presence. However, onmyōdō, which had until then been supposedly considered classified information, was widely leaked to the private sector, and numerous private onmyōji were active throughout Japan. For this reason, in the middle and early modern periods, the term "onmyōji" no longer referred to the bureaucrats of the Bureau of Onmyō, but rather to the unofficial onmyōji who received private requests and performed blessings, prayers, and divination. Furthermore, onmyōdō fused with popular beliefs and folk rituals in various regions, and each of them underwent their own changes. Around this time, from the end of the Kamakura period to the beginning of the Northern and Southern courts period (early 14th century to early 15th century), the book Sangoku Sōden In'yō Kankatsu Hoki Naiden Kin'u Gyokuto Shū written under the name of Abe no Seimei became widely known as a book of private onmyōdō, which were linked to the belief in Gozu Tennō. From this time onward, some private onmyōji who moved from place to place without having a fixed residence were regarded as lowly as other non-settled people. They were sometimes called "doctors," but there were also those who claimed to be onmyōji and traveled around Japan on the pretext of offering mediumship and necromancy services, charging high fees for their prayers and divinations. The word "onmyōji" has become widely known as an extremely occult and fishy image.

=== The revival of the official onmyōji and the rise of the private onmyōji in the early modern period ===
After the death of Toyotomi Hideyoshi and the defeat of the Western Army at the Battle of Sekigahara in 1600, the momentum of the Toyotomi family weakened. Tsuchimikado Hisanaga was then granted the right by Tokugawa Ieyasu to administer a total of 177 koku and 6 to, covering the villages of Kaide, Otokuni County, Yamashiro Province (present-day Kaide, Mukō City, Kyoto Prefecture); Terado, Otokuni County (present-day Terado, Mukō City); Umekōji, Kadono County, Yamashiro Province (present-day Umekōji, Shimogyō Ward, Kyoto City, Kyoto Prefecture); Saiin, Kadono County (present-day Saiin, Ukyō Ward, Kyoto City); and Kisshōin, Kii County, Yamashiro Province (present-day Kisshōin, Minami Ward, Kyoto City), and he returned to the Imperial court. When the Tokugawa shogunate was established by Tokugawa Ieyasu in 1603, the Tsuchimikado family was officially recognized by the shogunate as the head of the onmyōdō sect, and was in charge of geomorphology in the construction and layout of facilities for the development of the Edo area. Later, onmyōdō was also used in the construction of Nikkō Tōshō-gū Shrine. The shogunate also began to control the activities of private onmyōji, which were flourishing in various parts of Japan at the time, with the aim of controlling folk religion to prevent the spread of rumors. The shogunate tried to use two onmyōji families from the Heian period (the Kamo and Abe family) to give authority to its measures. In addition to the Tsuchimikado family, which survived as a descendant of the Abe family, the shogunate planned to reestablish the Kōtokui family, which was a descendant of the Kamo family and a branch of the defunct Kadenokōji family, and to have the two families control the private onmyōji in various regions.

With this move, the Tsuchimikado family seized the opportunity of the death of Kōtokui Tomosuke in 1682 to effectively eliminate the Kōtokui family and once again monopolize the various positions in the Bureau of Onmyō. In addition to the patronage they received from the Imperial court, they also succeeded in getting the Tokugawa shogunate, the de facto government, to grant them the sole right to control onmyōji throughout Japan. They exercised their exclusive right to issue licenses to onmyōji (not as onmyōji, but as "students") from all over Japan, and became the official grand masters, making their presence felt. Furthermore, the onmyōdō took on the form of shinto in its appearance and came to be widely known as the Tensha Tsuchimikado Shinto, and the Tsuchimikado family reached its peak. In wartime samurai society, onmyōdō was largely neglected, but under the peaceful Tokugawa shogunate, it was incorporated into the rituals of the shogunate and became a subject of study by shogunate bureaucrats as a precedent for the past.

Onmyōji in various regions were also active, with the Ogasawara family of the Seiwa Genji clan, a samurai onmyōji, and others repeatedly fusing and changing their beliefs with the folklore of various regions, and throughout the Edo period it became quite popular among the people as a folk religion.

In 1684, Shibukawa Shunkai, an astronomer of the Tokugawa shogunate, completed the first calendar made by Japanese, the Jōkyō calendar. The Xuanming calendar, which had been in use for 823 years, was reformed by the Jōkyō calendar, and the Tsuchimikado family lost the authority to arrange the calendar to the Tokugawa shogunate. About 70 years later, in 1755, the calendar was reformed again when Tsuchimikado Yasukuni created the Hōryaku calendar. The Tsuchimikado family regained the authority to arrange and reform the calendar. However, the Hōryaku calendar had many flaws and was considered to be rather inferior to the scientifically created Jōkyō calendar.

Later, the Astronomical Department established under the Tokugawa shogunate's Temple and Shrine Magistrates regained control and created the Tenpō calendar, which was said to be considerably more accurate than the Tsuchimikado family's Hōryaku calendar or even the Jōkyō calendar, which was considered more accurate than the Hōryaku calendar.

=== The policy of eliminating onmyōji in modern times and modern onmyōji ===
After Tokugawa Yoshinobu, the last shogun of the Tokugawa shogunate, returned his power to Emperor Meiji, in the Meiji era, taking advantage of the confusion of the Meiji Restoration, Tsuchimikado Haruo, the Head of Onmyō, requested that the Astronomical Department be confiscated by the Bureau of Onmyō and this was granted, expropriating all of the authority for astronomical observation and map surveying. Later, sensing that the government of Meiji Japan was planning to introduce the Western-style Gregorian calendar, Tsuchimikado Haruo insisted on the "Meiji Reformation" of the calendar to maintain the existing lunisolar calendar, but the proposal was never taken up due to his death.

On the contrary, when the leaders of the government of Meiji Japan received a proposal from Tsuchimikado Haruo to reform the calendar, those who were advocating the introduction of Western civilization opposed it, saying that the onmyōdō should be eliminated because there was a strong risk that the Bureau of Onmyō would become the center of opposition to the introduction of modern science to promote the introduction of advanced Western technology to develop the country and strengthen military power. In addition, "In direct rule by the Emperor, there can be no barbarism in which a vassal exercises real authority over the Emperor, nor any impertinence in which he directs the Emperor's actions. Moreover, it is inexcusable that onmyōdō, a technique of foreign (i.e., Chinese) origin, should be used in spite of the existence of Japan's Shinto." This argument resonated with both the pure Shintoists and the exclusionists, and the majority of them rejected onmyōdō. Furthermore, Tsuchimikado Harenaga, who became the Head of Onmyō after the death of his father Tsuchimikado Haruo, was still a very young boy and could not spontaneously refute the claims.

The government of Meiji Japan took advantage of this period to force the abolition of the Bureau of Onmyō in 1870, and transferred its duties of astronomical observation and calendar arrangement to the Astronomical and Calendar Bureau of the University (now the University of Tokyo), the Navy Hydrographic Bureau of the Ministry of War, the Astronomical Bureau of the Ministry of Education, and the Observatory. Tsuchimikado Harenaga, the former Head of Onmyō, was appointed as the official in charge of the Astronomical Bureau of the university, but he was relieved of this position at the end of 1870, and astrology, onmyōdō, and the calendars were completely removed from the hands of the Tsuchimikado family. On 9 December 1870, a decree was issued banning the Tensha Tsuchimikado Shinto and the spread of onmyōdō to the civilian population as it was a superstition. (Note: Therefore, at this point, both the Tsuchimikado family and the Kurahashi family, a branch of the Tsuchimikado family, had left the onmyōdō and onmyōji was no longer an official position. On 21 May 1946, the Tensha Tsuchimikado Shinto was revived, but Yoshiko Tsuchimikado (born 1959; a daughter of the last male head of the family, Noritada Tsuchimikado (1920–1994)), the current female head of the Tsuchimikado family has taken a stance of not being involved in any way. Therefore, since the Meiji era, there has been no such title as "onmyōji" or "Onmyōdō Sōke" in modern times, and aside from its existence in the private sector, there is no such thing as an onmyōji as an official position.) The Festival of the Deva and Naraka, an onmyōdō ritual that had always been performed from the time of Emperor Go-Yōzei (1571–1617) until the reign of Emperor Kōmei (1831–1867), the last Emperor of the Edo period, was not performed for Emperor Meiji (1852–1912). The Tokugawa shoguns, like the Emperors, have always performed the festival every time they were given the position of shogun by the Emperors. The Tsuchimikado family lost their official position in charge of onmyōdō, and also lost the exclusive right to issue the license, and although they had no choice but to further transform the Tensha Tsuchimikado Shinto into more shintoistically, they were deprived of their influence over private onmyōji in various regions.

Since the ban by the government of Meiji Japan, there has been no official event derived from onmyōdō, and there has been no popularity of onmyōdō in the private sector either. However, in reality, calendars derived from the onmyōdō still circulated unofficially, with Calendrical Notes gaining popularity and walking on their own. In particular, the Twelve Directions were heavily used, and there were many people who referred to them in rituals and codes of conduct.

After the Pacific War and the official repeal of the laws and ordinances prohibiting onmyōdō with the repeal of the old laws and ordinances of the Meiji era, the Six Days, one of the Carendrical Notes once used by onmyōji, were preferred to the Twelve Directions and often appear on many calendars, but this is only used as a supplement. As for calendars related to fortune, the Takashima calendar (unrelated to the Jingū calendar of Ise Grand Shrine) of Takashima's I Ching Divination (no relation to Kaemon Takashima, a businessman and I Ching diviner of the Meiji era) by Jingūkan (a publisher in Taitō City, Tokyo Metropolis) is relatively popular, but this is hardly onmyōdō.

Today, there are few people who rely on the arts of onmyōdō for general guidelines for behavior, and there is no trace of the authority of onmyōji that once flourished. The Association of Tensha Tsuchimikado Shinto still exists in Ōi Town in the western part of Fukui Prefecture, in the area of Natashō in Wakasa Province, which used to be the territory of the Tsuchimikado family, as a religious organization that retains elements of onmyōdō, but it is far removed from the onmyōdō of the middle to late Heian period. Other than that, there are only a few vestiges of onmyōdō surviving in local onmyōji such as the Izanagi school in Kami City (formerly Monobe Village), Kōchi Prefecture. Based on the occult image of the spell-binding onmyōji of the Heian period, various creative works and characters were created to exaggerate their superhumanity and peculiarity. In particular, from the late 1990s to the early 2000s, onmyōji became popular, and many works were created.

== Overview of rituals in onmyōdō ==
As onmyōdō itself has diversified over time, its rituals have also not been uniform. Since the rituals of onmyōdō, including its influence with other religions, are still in the process of research, it is difficult to describe them in detail. When onmyōdō was first introduced to Japan, it is thought that it was strongly influenced by the so-called jugondō. In the "Onmyōryōshiki (Japanese: 陰陽寮式; literally: Procedures of the Bureau of Onmyō)" of the book "Engishiki," there is a record of the festivals held by onmyōji in the court. According to it, there are the nuo folk religion (setsubun), bonfire, kitchen God festival, death anniversary festival of the previous Emperor, new year's festival, and so on. Among them, in the nuo folk religion, it says that an onmyōji goes (to a stage) and reads the ritual text, the first half of which is a Classical Chinese text read aloud, and the second half is a declaration like liturgical incantations. In addition, the medieval book "Bunkanshō" gives an overview of several rituals. The rituals of onmyōdō consisted of large, medium, and small rituals, and it seems that they were used in different ways depending on the situation.

Among the representative rituals of onmyōdō are the Festival of the Great Emperor of the Sacred Mountain of the East, which is held to honor Dongyue Dadi, the ruler of human life, and the Festival of the Deva and Naraka, which was held every time an Emperor ascended to the throne. The "Bunkanshō" also mentions that there were various other onmyōdō rituals. The texts of some of these rituals are still extant.

Along with such practiced rituals, for so many centuries, onmyōdō also encompassed a vast number of other occult practices that have been historicized. Such includes divination and astrology to geomancy and exorcism-broadening its scope and influence within Japanese culture. Onmyōji, those practicing onmyōdō, often dealt with the notion of defending the court from evil spirits as well as from natural disasters. This role served to mix both spiritual and practical purposes. With time, practices have advanced and become more interlinked with Buddhism and Shinto traditions, and it gradually evolved to be the syncretic system adapting to the spiritual needs of various periods. This influence can even be seen in festivals and rituals of modern-day Japan itself as a testament to the great cultural importance of onmyōdō.

== In media ==
=== Books ===
- Teito Monogatari, written by Hiroshi Aramata, published in 1985
- Onmyōji, written by Baku Yumemakura, published in 1988
- The Summer of the Ubume, Mōryō no Hako and other Kyōgokudō series, written by Natsuhiko Kyogoku, published in 1994
- Onmyō no Miyako, written by Soichiro Watase, published in 2001
- Shōnen Onmyōji, written by Mitsuru Yūki, published in 2001
- Rental Magica, written by Makoto Sanda, published in 2004
- Bakemonogatari, written by Nisio Isin, published in 2005
- Fairy Navigator Runa, written by Miyoko Ikeda, published in 2008
- Tokyo Ravens, written by Kōhei Azano, published in 2010

=== Manga and anime ===
- Tokyo Babylon, written by Clamp, published in 1990
- Doomed Megalopolis, Chief Directed by Rintaro in 1991 and based on the novel Teito Monogatari by Hiroshi Aramata
- X, written by Clamp, published in 1992
- Shaman King, written by Hiroyuki Takei, published in 1998
- Gag Manga Biyori, written by Kōsuke Masuda, published in 2000
- Magical Shopping Arcade Abenobashi, created by Gainax, published in 2001
- Amatsuki, written by Shinobu Takayama, published in 2002
- Gin Tama, written by Hideaki Sorachi, published in 2003
- xxxHolic, written by Clamp, published in 2003
- Onmyō Taisenki, written by Yoshihiko Tomizawa, published in 2003
- Musashi Gundoh, based on an unused story by Monkey Punch, published in 2006
- Shibariya Komachi, written by Mick Takeuchi, published in 2006
- Nura: Rise of the Yokai Clan, written by Hiroshi Shiibashi, published in 2008
- Drifters, written by Kouta Hirano, published in 2009
- Twin Star Exorcists, written by Yoshiaki Sukeno, published in 2013
- Garo: The Animation, second season written by Shō Aikawa and Toshiki Inoue, published 2015
- Jujutsu Kaisen, written by Gege Akutami, published in 2018
- The Reincarnation of the Strongest Exorcist in Another World, written by Kiichi Kosuzu, published in 2018
- MAO, written by Rumiko Takahashi, published in 2019
- Onmyoji, an original net animation adaptation by Netflix, directed by Soubi Yamamoto and produced by Marvy Jack, released on Netflix on November 28, 2023.
- Nue's Exorcist, written by Kota Kawae, published in 2023.

=== Films ===
- Tokyo: The Last Megalopolis, a 1988 Japanese fantasy film directed by Akio Jissōji, based on the novel Teito Monogatari by Hiroshi Aramata
- Onmyōji, a 2001 Japanese film based on the Onmyōji novel series, by Baku Yumemakura and released in the U.S. in 2003 as Onmyōji: The Yin Yang Master
  - Onmyoji II, the 2003 sequel
- The Yin-Yang Master: Dream of Eternity, a 2020 Chinese fantasy film based on the Onmyōji novel series, by Baku Yumemakura directed by Guo Jingming, and starring Mark Chao and Deng Lun
- The Yinyang Master, a 2021 Chinese fantasy film directed by Li Weiran, and starring Chen Kun, Zhou Xun and William Chan based on the game that was based on the Onmyōji novel series, by Baku Yumemakura
- The Yin Yang Master Zero (陰陽師0, Onmyōji Zero), a 2024 Japanese fantasy film based on the Onmyōji novel series, by Baku Yumemakura, starring Kento Yamazaki.

=== Video games ===
- Kuon no Kizuna, developed by FOG Inc., released in 1998
- Tokyo Majin Gakuen, produced by Shūhō Imai, released in 1998
- Kuon, developed by FromSoftware, released in 2004
- 11eyes: Tsumi to Batsu to Aganai no Shōjo, developed by Lass, released in 2008
- Naraka: Bladepoint, developed by 24 Entertainment, released in 2021 features the character Kurumi Tsuchimikado, who according to game lore is the first female Onmyōji, descended from a long line of Onmyōdō masters.
- The Nioh series, developed by Team Ninja, allows the player to use onmyō magic. Abe no Seimei and Ashiya Dōman are also present in the second game, Nioh 2, as a friendly NPC and boss character, respectively. Other historical figures who were not historically onmyōji are portrayed as such in the game, including Tenkai, Fuku, Saitō Toshimitsu, and Minamoto no Raikō.

== See also ==
- Abe no Seimei
- Da Liu Ren
- Fangxiangshi
- Goryō
- Itako
- Kuji-in
- Onmyōdō
- Sanpaku
- Seimei Shrine
- Senji Ryakketsu
- Shikigami
- Shinigami
- Tengenjutsu (fortune telling)
- Ushi no toki mairi
