= Seimei =

Seimei may refer to:

- Seimei Shrine, a Shinto shrine dedicated to Abe no Seimei
- 5541 Seimei, an asteroid discovered in 1976
- Seimei, a solar term in traditional East Asian calendars
- "Seimei/Still Alive" (声明/Still Alive), a single by Japanese rock band B'z
- Seimei (figure skating program), by Japanese figure skater Yuzuru Hanyu

== People ==
- Abe no Seimei (安倍 晴明, 921 A.D. – 1005), a Japanese onmyōji from the Heian period
- Seimei Gamo (蒲生 晴明, born 1954), Japanese handball player

== Fictional Characters ==
- Seimei Aoyagi (青柳 清明), a character from the manga series Loveless
