= Ashiya Dōman =

Heian period onmyōji

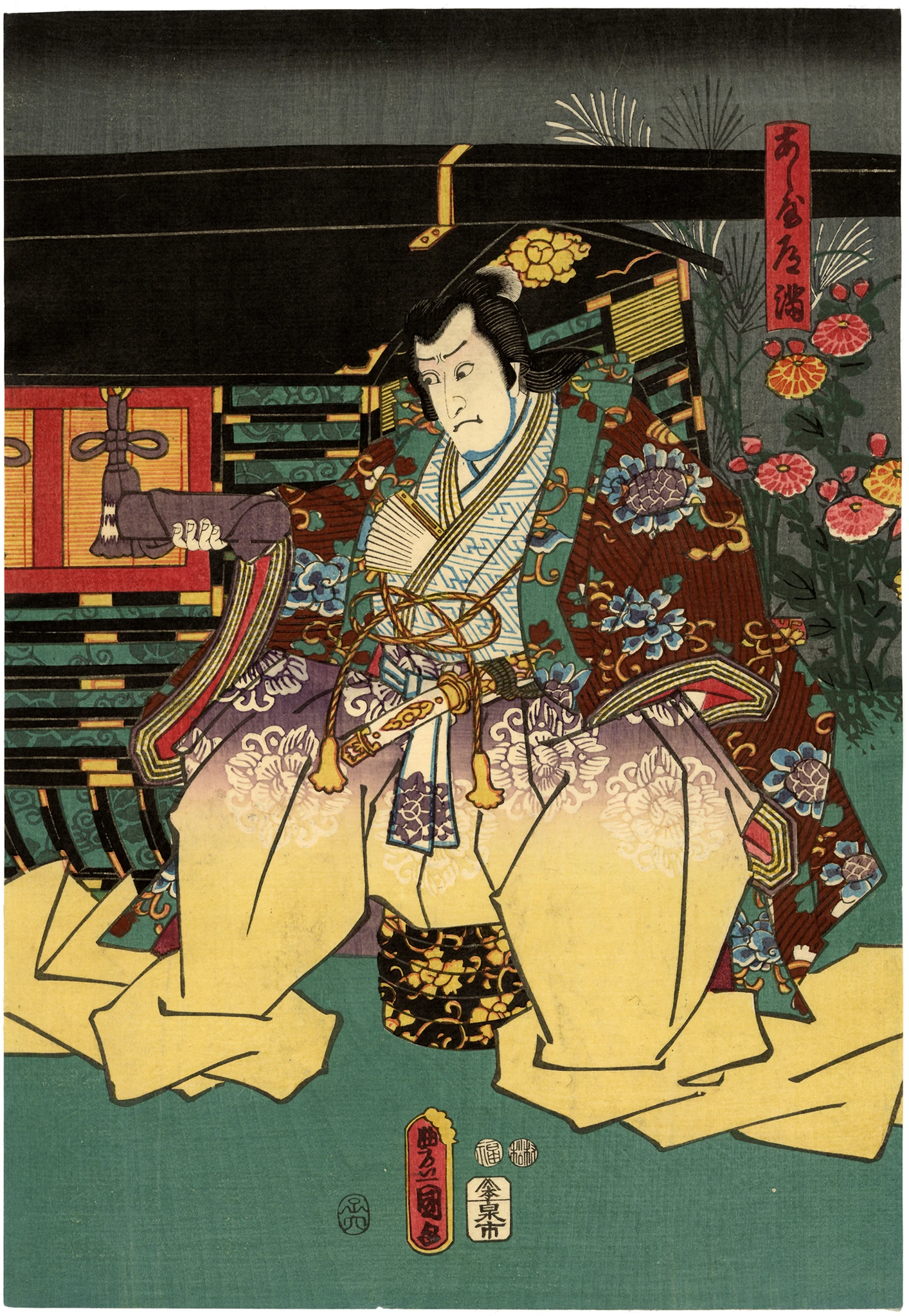
Kabuki actor as Ashiya Dōman in the play Ashiya Dōman Ōuchi Kagami

Ashiya Dōman (ja. 蘆屋道満, spelled also 芦屋道満), also known as Dōma Hōshi (道摩法師) was an onmyōji who lived during the Heian period, in the reign of the Emperor Ichijō. The years of birth and death are unknown.

Despite being generally known as Ashiya Dōman nowadays, that name is unknown in the literature of the time when he was said to have been active. In addition, there are many unclear points about the real image, such as the theory that regards Ashiya Dōman and Dōma Hōshi to be different men. There is a record that "there was an onmyōji named Dōman in the Heian period, and he was hired by a noble woman named Takashina no Mitsuko (高階光子), aunt of Fujiwara no Korechika" According to the Harima Kagami, which was a history of the Edo Period, he was from Kishi village in Harima Province (present day Nishikankicho Kishi, Kakogawa, Hyōgo).

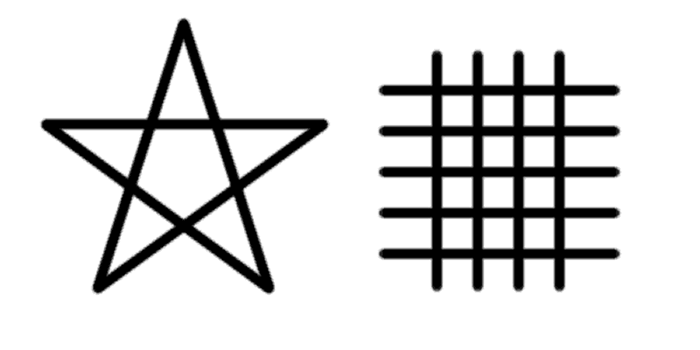
Seiman Dōman amulet, consisting of Seimei's pentagram and Dōman's lattice

== Career ==
In most of the literature up to the Edo Period, he is portrayed as having a rivalry with Abe no Seimei (considered the founder of Onmyōdō), being the "evil Dōman" (悪の道満), counterpart to the "Seimei of justice" (正義の晴明). He had power of jujutsu (referring to spellcasting, written 呪術) in no way inferior to that of Seimei. He often tried to embarrass Seimei so that he could usurp his position. One noted story involved Dōman and the young Seimei in a divination duel to reveal the contents of a particular box. Dōman had another person put fifteen mandarin oranges into the box and "divined" that there were fifteen oranges in it. Seimei saw through the ruse, metamorphosed the oranges into rats, and stated that fifteen rats were in the box. When the rats were revealed, Dōman was shocked and defeated.

Being finally defeated by Seimei in a fight using shikigami, Ashiya Dōman was exiled to Harima Province. While Abe no Seimei was an onmyōji who was employed by Fujiwara no Michinaga, Dōman was an onmyōji who was employed by Fujiwara no Akimitsu. Akimitsu had a grudge against Fujiwara no Michinaga, because his daughter Enshi was the wife of the next Emperor of Japan, Prince Atsuakira, until the Prince abandoned her and their son to marry Michinaga's daughter. Legend says that the despair caused Enshi to fall ill and die, and so Akimitsu commissioned Ashiya Dōman to hex Michinaga. A curse caused all of Michinaga's daughters to die in quick succession, and the people who feared Akimitsu for what they assumed to be his divine power started calling him "Demonic Minister of the Left". There are also claims that a relative of Korechika, Takashina no Mitsuko, attempted to get Michinaga hexed, and was arrested for that.

As the legend of Abe no Seimei spread, so did the legend of Dōman. He has many alleged burial mounds (kubizuka) remaining in various parts of Japan. Shoganji Temple in Nishikankicho Kishi in Kakogawa preserves the legend of Ashiya Dōman.

== Cultural references ==
Legends about Dōman were later dramatized for Jōruri and Kabuki, with the play Ashiya Dōman Ōuchi Kagami, written by Takeda Izumo I in 1734, being one of the most popular to this day. However, after the Meiji era, the performance of the third act, in which Dōman is an important character, became rare, so it became difficult to understand why the work was named after him. When performing this work in Kabuki, there are many cases where only the 4th act is performed, and it is sometimes called "Kuzunoha" (Dōman is only a minor character there). In the play, the sudden death of a court astrologer Kamo no Yasunori causes a succession battle between Abe no Seimei's father, Abe no Yasuna, and Ashiya Dōman. In the final scenes of the play, there is a contest of magic between Seimei and Ashiya Dōman, with Seimei finally inheriting the astrological duties.
