= Tengen =

Tengen may refer to:

- Tengen (company), an American video game developer and publisher
- Tengen (era), a Japanese era from 978 to 983
- Tengen (Go), the center point on a Go board and the name of a Go competition in Japan
- Tengen, Germany, a town in Baden-Württemberg, Germany
- Tengen, a character in Jujutsu Kaisen
- Tengen Uzui, a character in Demon Slayer: Kimetsu no Yaiba

== See also ==
- Tengenjutsu (disambiguation)
