= Kamo no Yasunori no musume =

Daughter of Kamo no Yasunori

Kamo no Yasunori no Musume (賀茂保憲女) was the second daughter of the Heian period onmyōji Kamo no Yasunori. She lived during the tenth century. She is conventionally known simply as "the daughter [musume] of Kamo no Yasunori"; her personal name has been lost.

In her youth, she suffered from a disease that marred her appearance. She became a prolific poet, earning a reputation for her talent. Many of her poems were autobiographical in nature. They are collected as the Kamo no Yasunori no Musume Shū, also known as the Kamo no Yasunori no Jo Shū.

After her lifetime, her poetry faded from study for a time; in 1999, scholar Edith Sarra counted her among "[Japanese] women writers who had been hitherto overlooked or scanted." However, her poems have continued to be republished in collections.
