= Kuzunoha =

Name of legendary fox in Japan

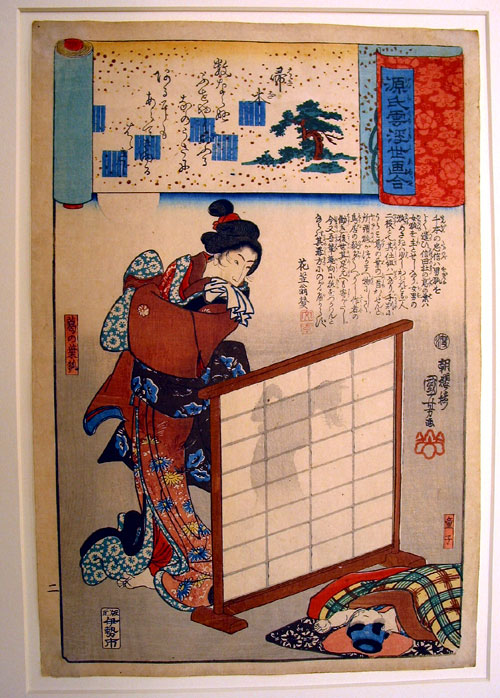
The kitsune Kuzunoha. Note the shadow of a fox cast on the screen. Print by Kuniyoshi.

Kuzunoha (葛の葉, Kuzunoha), also written Kuzu-no-Ha, is the name of a popular kitsune character in Japanese folklore. Her name means leaf of arrowroot. Legend states that she is the mother of Abe no Seimei, the famous onmyōji.

== Legend ==
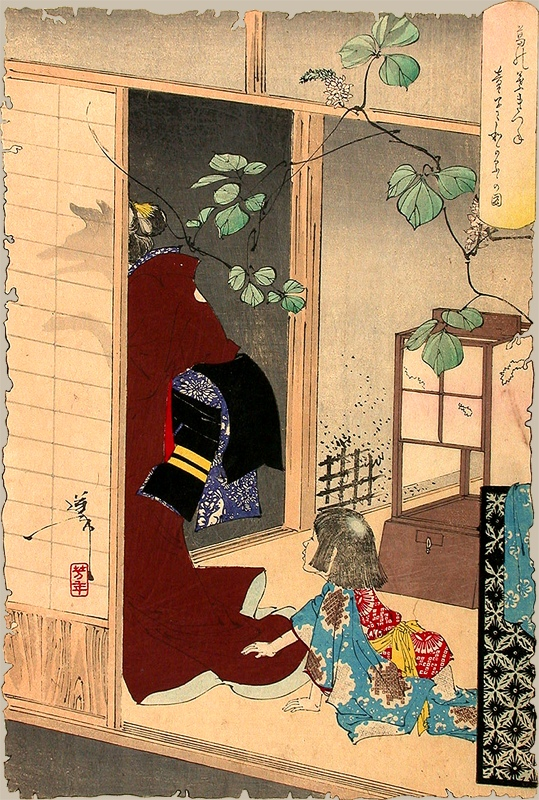
The Fox-woman Kuzunoha Leaving Her Child. A famous print by Yoshitoshi depicting Kuzunoha's departure.

A young nobleman, Abe no Yasuna (安倍 保名), is on his way to visit a shrine in Shinoda, in Settsu Province, when he encounters a young military commissioner who is hunting foxes in order to obtain their livers for use as medicine. Yasuna battles the hunter, sustaining several wounds, and sets free the white fox he had trapped.

Later, a beautiful woman named Kuzunoha helps Yasuna to return to his home. She is the fox he saved, adopting human form in order to tend to his wounds. He falls in love with her and they marry. She bears him a child, Seimei (childhood name Dōji), who proves prodigiously clever. Kuzunoha realizes that her son has inherited part of her supernatural power.

Several years later, while Kuzunoha is viewing some chrysanthemums, her son catches sight of the tip of her tail. Her true nature revealed, Kuzunoha prepares to return to her life in the wild. She leaves behind a farewell poem, asking her husband Yasuna to come to see her in Shinoda Forest.

Yasuna and his son search for Kuzunoha, and eventually she appears to them as a fox. Revealing that she is the kami, or spirit, of Shinoda Shrine, she gives her son Seimei a gift, allowing him to understand the language of animals.

== Plays ==
Kuzunoha figures in kabuki and bunraku plays based on her legend, including the five-part Ashiya Dōman Ōuchi Kagami (A Courtly Mirror of Ashiya Dōman). The fourth part, Kuzunoha or The White Fox of Shinoda, which is frequently performed independently of the other scenes, focuses on her story, adding minor variations such as the idea that Kuzunoha imitates a princess and is forced to depart not because Seimei glimpsed her tail but because the real woman unexpectedly appears.

== In Izumi ==
In Izumi there is a Kuzunoha Inari shrine, said to be built upon the place at which Kuzunoha departed, leaving her farewell poem on a silk screen.

The poem itself has become famous: "Koishiku ba / tazunekite miyo / izumi naru / shinoda no mori no / urami kuzunoha." Folklorist Kiyoshi Nozaki offers the following translation: "If you love me, darling, come and see me. / You will find me yonder in the great wood / Of Shinoda of Izumi Province where the leaves / Of arrowroots always rustle in pensive mood."

A pond in the area is also remembered in connection with the legend, and has been designated a historic site by the city.
