= Onmyōdō =

Traditional Japanese esoteric cosmology and divination system

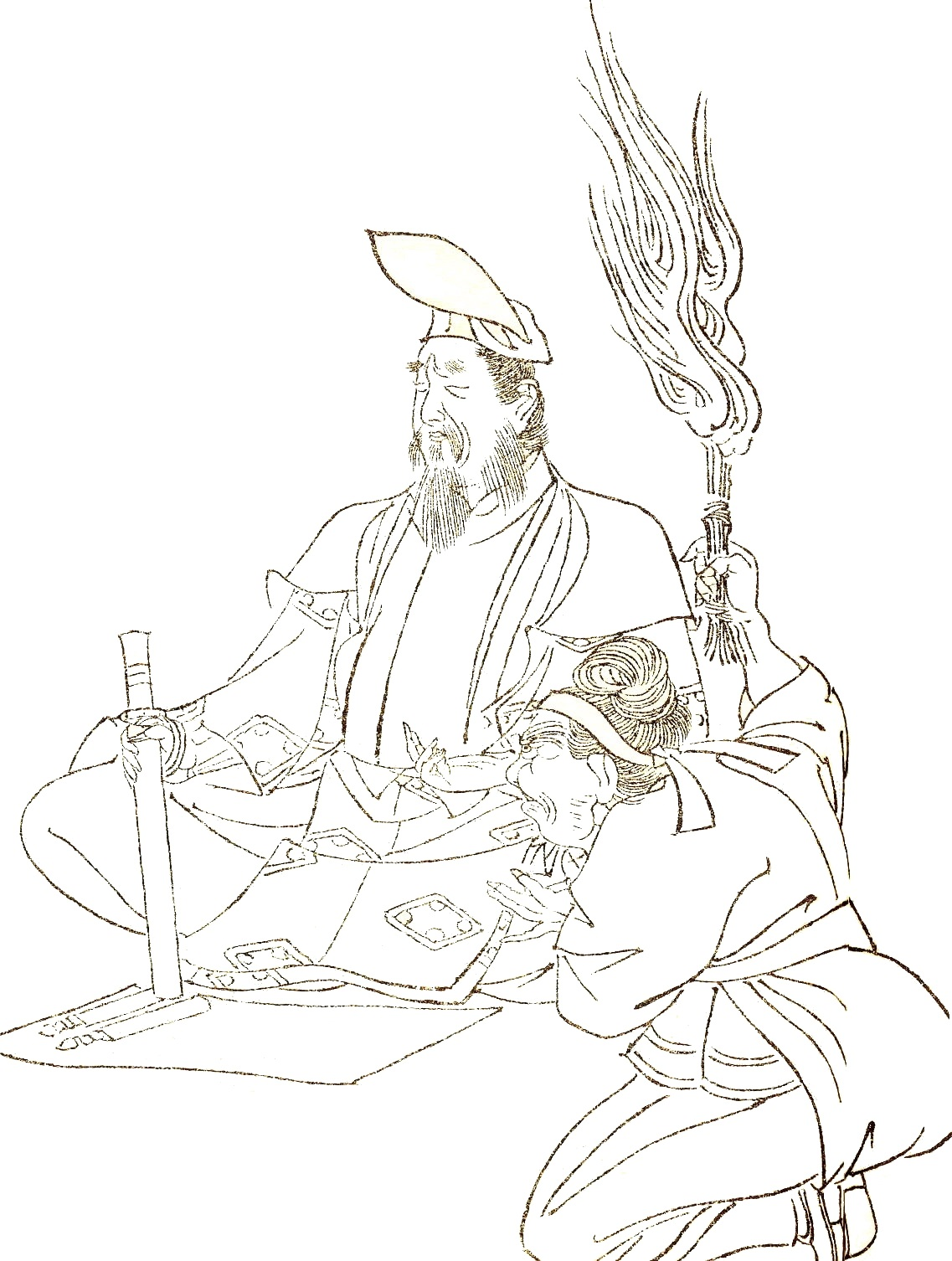
Abe no Seimei, a famous onmyōji

Onmyōdō (陰陽道; also In'yōdō, lit. 'The Way of Yin and Yang') is a technique that uses knowledge of astronomy and calendars to divine good fortune in terms of date, time, direction and general personal affairs, originating from the philosophy of the yin-yang and the five elements.

The philosophy of yin and yang and wuxing was introduced to Japan at the beginning of the 6th century, and, influenced by Taoism, Buddhism, and Confucianism, evolved into the earliest system of Onmyōdō around the late 7th century. In 701, the Taiho Code established the departments and posts of onmyōji who practiced Onmyōdō in the Imperial Court, and Onmyōdō was institutionalized. From around the 9th century during the Heian period, Onmyōdō interacted with Shinto and Goryō worship (御霊信仰) in Japan, and developed into a system unique to Japan. Abe no Seimei, who was active during the Heian period, is the most famous onmyōji (Onmyōdō practitioner) in Japanese history and has appeared in various Japanese literature in later years. Onmyōdō was under the control of the imperial government, and later its courtiers, the Tsuchimikado family, until the middle of the 19th century, at which point it became prohibited as superstition.

== Development ==
In the 5th and 6th centuries, the principles of yin-yang and the Five Elements were transmitted to Japan from China and Baekje along with Buddhism and Confucianism, particularly by the obscure Korean monk Gwalleuk. Yin-yang and the Five Elements, as well as the divisions of learning to which they were linked – astronomy, calendar-making, the reckoning of time, divination, and studies based on observation of nature – were amalgamated into fortune telling. This process of judging auspicious or harmful signs present in the natural world was accepted into Japanese society as a technique for predicting good or bad fortune in the human world. Such techniques were known mostly by Buddhist monks and physicians from mainland Asia, who were knowledgeable in reading and writing Chinese. Over time, demand from members of the Imperial Court who believed that Onmyōdō divination would be helpful in decision-making, made it necessary for the laity to perform the art, and onmyōji began to appear around the middle of the 7th century. Under the Taiho Code enacted in the early 8th century, the departments of the Imperial Court to which onmyōji belonged were defined by law.

From around the 9th century during the Heian period, Onmyōdō interacted with Shinto and Goryō worship in Japan, and developed into a system unique to Japan. Until then, Onmyōdō emphasized divination for policy decisions by high government officials, but since the Heian period, Onmyōdō has emphasized magic and religious services such as warding off evil for preventing natural disasters and epidemics and for the productiveness of grain, as well as curses against opponents. Because Shinto places importance on purity, Shinto priests were required to perform misogi (ritual purification) and fast before performing these religious services, so their activities were restricted. On the other hand, since onmyōji did not have to perform misogi or fast, they were able to deal with kegare (uncleanliness) more easily, and they expanded their activities beyond the support of Shinto priests. It gradually spread from the Imperial Court to the general public. In the 10th century Kamo no Tadayuki (賀茂 忠行) and his son Kamo no Yasunori (賀茂 保典), made great advancements in Onmyōdō, astronomy and calendar science. From among their students emerged Abe no Seimei (安倍清明), who displayed superior skills in the divining arts of Onmyōdō, by which he gained an uncommon amount of trust from the court society. Tadayuki and Yasunori passed on their skills in astronomy to Seimei while their advances in calendar-making went to Yasunori's son. From the end of the Heian period into the Middle Ages, astronomy and calendar science were completely subsumed into Onmyōdō, and the Abe and Kamo families came to dominate the art in the Imperial Court.

== Onmyōji ==
Onmyōji (陰陽師; also In'yōji) was one of the classifications of civil servants belonging to the Bureau of Onmyō in ancient Japan's ritsuryo system. People with this title were professional practitioners of Onmyōdō.

Onmyōji were specialists in magic and divination. Their court responsibilities ranged from tasks such as keeping track of the calendar, to mystical duties such as divination and protection of the capital from evil spirits. They could divine auspicious or harmful influences in the earth, and were instrumental in the moving of capitals. It is said that an onmyōji could also summon and control shikigami. During the Heian period the nobility organized their lives around practices recommended by onmyōji. The practice of "lucky and unlucky directions" provides an example. Depending on the season, time of day, and other circumstances, a particular direction might be bad luck for an individual. If one's house was located in that direction, such an individual was advised not to go back directly to his house but had to "change direction" (katatagae), by going in a different direction and lodging there. Such a person would not dare to go in the forbidden direction, but stayed where they were, even if that resulted in absence from the court, or passing up invitations from influential people.

Famous onmyōji include Kamo no Yasunori and Abe no Seimei (921–1005). After Seimei's death, the Emperor Ichijō had a shrine erected at his home in Kyoto.

Onmyōji had political clout during the Heian period, but in later times when the imperial court fell into decline, their state patronage was lost completely. In modern-day Japan, onmyōji are defined as a type of priest, and although there are many who claim to be mediums and spiritualists, the onmyōji continues to be a hallmark occult figure.

== Later history ==
Onmyōdō was officially abolished in 1870 by the Tensha Shinto Prohibition Ordinance, but it was permitted again after the propagation of religious freedom and the abolition of State Shinto in 1945. A new organization for Tensha Tsuchimikado Shinto, considered the modern form of Onmyōdō, was established in 1954. As of 2023, the head was Yoshihito Fujita.

Sign at Seimei Jinja in Tsuruga, noting that the shrine holds a "prayer stone" said to have been used by Abe no Seimei in his study of onmyōdō

== See also ==
- Chinese alchemy
- Chinese fortune telling
- Chinese influence on Japanese culture
- Dogū
- Futomani
- Haniwa
- Hōko (doll)
- Itako
- Jujutsu Kaisen, 2018 manga and anime series around onmyōdō practitioners
- Konjin
- Kokkuri
- Ofuda
- Omamori
- Onmyōji
- Omikuji
- Senjafuda
- Shikigami
- Shugendō
- Teito Monogatari, popular 1985 historical fantasy novel which initiated the onmyōdō boom in current Japanese popular culture
- Tengenjutsu (fortune telling)
- Ukehi
- Zuijin
