= Tengenjutsu =

Tengenjutsu may refer to:

- Tengenjutsu (fortune telling) (天源術), a Japanese fortune telling method
- Tian yuan shu, or tengenjutsu (天元術), a Chinese and Japanese system of algebra
