= Senji Ryakketsu =

10th-century text by Abe no Seimei

Senji Ryakketsu (占事略决; lit. The Summary to Judgements of Divinations) is one of the texts written by the legendary Abe no Seimei during the Heian Period in Japan. It is attributed to Seimei since it contains a chapter that clearly bears his name.

== Contents ==
The text contains six thousand forecast and thirty-six fortune-telling techniques based on divination through use of shikigami. Many of these divinations relate to normal daily lives such as determining the gender of an unborn child, finding lost or missing objects, and advice on how to lead one's personal life.

== Popular culture ==
In the manga Shaman King, this book seems to be the inspiration that led to the creation of the mystical book called Chō-Senjiryakketsu containing the thoughts and secrets of Hao Asakura.
