= Tōkyūjutsu =

Traditional Japanese fortune-telling method

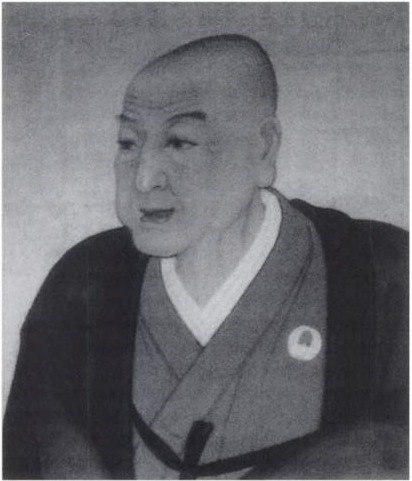
Yokoyama Marumitsu, founder of Tōkyūjutsu

Tōkyūjutsu (淘宮術) or Tōdō (淘道) is a Japanese divination (fortune telling) method, created by Yokoyama Marumitsu in the 1830s (Edo period). It was developed from tengenjutsu, a system with origins in China and was well established at the time. Tōkyūjutsu teaches that ones personality and character can be determined by factors such as the date of birth and facial features. Good fortune is allegedly achieved by finding and understanding this inner self that has been obscured.

Marumitsu gained many followers from the upper and middle classes of Edo. In 1848 they were forbidden from taking disciples and holding meetings by the Tokugawa shogunate, but Marumitsu was not exiled like many other leaders of groups outside the Shinto and Buddhist institutions. The group survived underground and revived after the Meiji Restoration. Today Tōkyūjutsu is practiced by an organization called Tōdōkai.
