= Yokoyama Marumitsu =

Japanese samurai and diviner (1780–1854)

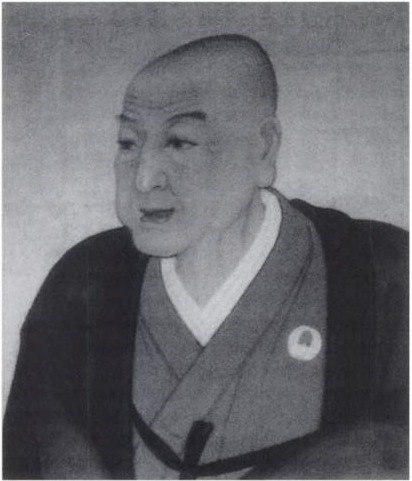
Yokoyama Marumitsu, painting by Iwase Shunga based on a wood-block print.

Yokoyama Marumitsu (Japanese: 横山 丸三; 1780–1854) was a Japanese late Edo period samurai and founder of the Tōkyūjutsu (淘宮術) divination and self-improvement method. He lived in Edo (now Tokyo). His real name was Yokoyama Okitaka (横山興孝), and he was also known as Sannosuke (三之助), Shunkisai (春龜斎), Kiosanjin (木黄山人), 淘山人, 百田楼, 小晌庵等 and other pen names.
