= Kamo no Yasunori =

Japanese onmyōji

- Title: Onmyōji

Personal life
- Born: 917 Japan
- Died: 977 (aged 59–60) Japan

Religious life
- Religion: Onmyōdō

Senior posting
- Based in: Japan
- Post: Onmyōji – adviser to the Emperor on the spiritually correct way to deal with issues.

Kamo no Yasunori (賀茂 保憲) was an onmyōji, a practitioner of onmyōdō, during the Heian period in Japan. He was considered the premier onmyōji of his time.

Yasunori was the son of the onmyōji Kamo no Tadayuki (賀茂 忠行). According to a tale in the Konjaku Monogatarishu, at the age of ten, Yasunori accompanied his father to an exorcism, where he was able to perceive the demons — a sign of talent, for, unlike Tadayuki, Yasunori was capable of doing so without formal training.

He later taught Abe no Seimei the art of onmyōdō. Seimei became his successor in astrology and divination, while Yasunori's son succeeded him in the creation of the calendar, a lesser task. For several centuries afterward, the Abe clan controlled the government ministry of onmyōdō, while the Kamo clan became hereditary keepers of the calendar.

Yasunori's second daughter became an acclaimed poet.

Yasunori's death is a driving plot element in the kabuki play Ashiya Dōman Ōuchi Kagami (A Courtly Mirror of Ashiya Dōman). In the play, he is the owner of the Kin'u Gyokuto Shū, a book of divination passed down from a Chinese wizard. He intends to marry his adopted daughter to his disciple Abe no Yasuna (安倍保名), the father of Abe no Seimei, and to give the book to him, but he dies before doing so. This sets the stage for a conflict between Ashiya Michitaru (as Dōman is called in the play) and Abe no Yasuna over ownership of the book.
