= Abe no Seimei =

Japanese mystic

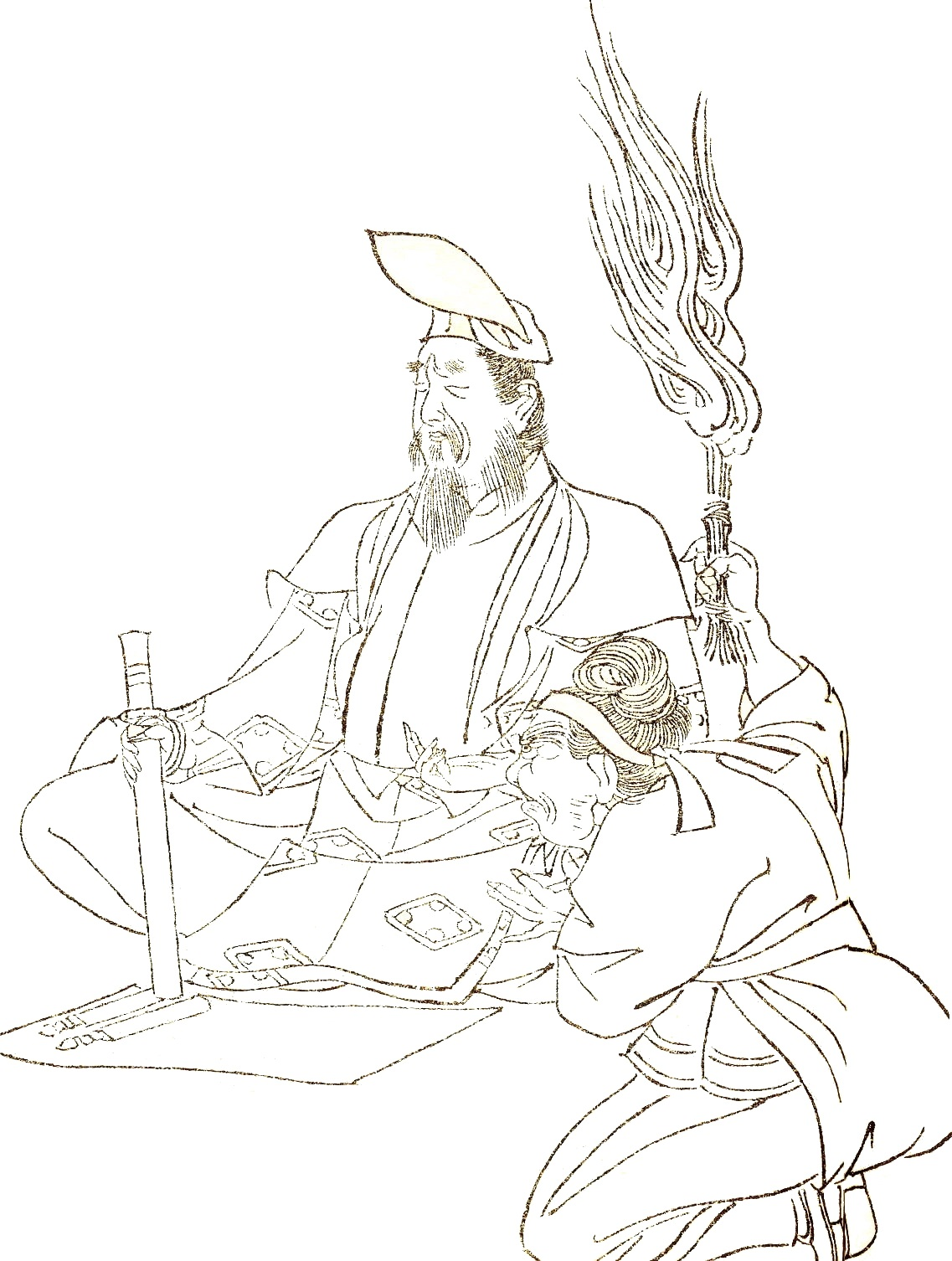
- Abe no Seimei as drawn by Kikuchi Yōsai
- Title: Onmyōji

Personal life
- Born: February 21, 921 A.D. – Abemonju-in Temple in Sakurai, Nara, Japan
- Died: October 31, 1005 (aged 84) Japan

Religious life
- Religion: Onmyōdō

Senior posting
- Based in: Japan
- Post: Onmyōji – adviser to the Emperor on the spiritually correct way to deal with issues.

Abe no Seimei (安倍 晴明; February 21, 921 AD – October 31, 1005) was a Japanese onmyōji, a court official and specialist of Onmyōdō, during the middle of the Heian period. In addition to his prominence in history, he is a legendary figure in Japanese folklore. He has been portrayed in several stories and films.

Seimei worked as an onmyōji for emperors and the Heian government, advising on the spiritually correct way to deal with issues. He prayed for the well-being of emperors and the government and advised on various issues. He was also an astrologer and predicted astrological events. He lived a long life of 84 years, free from any major illness, contributing to the popular belief that he had mystical powers.

The Seimei Shrine, located in Kyoto, is dedicated to him. The Abeno train station and district in Osaka are named after him, as it is one of the locations where legends place his birth.

== Life and history legends ==
Seimei's life is well-recorded, and there is little to question about his existence. Immediately after his death, however, legends arose much like those surrounding Merlin. Many legends of Seimei were originally written in the Konjaku Monogatarishū, and by the Edo period, many stories in circulation focused on his heroic acts.

His ancestry was not very clear. His ancestor might have been Abe no Masuki (安倍 益材), a "Master of the Palace Table" (大膳大夫, Daizen-no-daibu) or Abe no Shunzai (安倍 春材), a Kokushi of Awaji. Another candidate is Abe no Miushi, who appeared as a Minister of the Right (右大臣, Udaijin) in The Tale of the Bamboo Cutter. Seimei might also have been a descendant of Abe no Nakamaro as Abe-no-Sukune-no-Seimei (安倍宿禰晴明). However, some other sources recorded his name as Abe-no-Asomi-no-Seimei (安倍朝臣晴明), which refers to the Abe-no-Asomi descending from Abe no Miushi. The name Sukune (宿禰), through the Abe clan, was taken from Naniwa no Imiki (難波忌寸), later Naniwa no Sukune, of the Naniwa clan (難波氏), also known as the Naniwa no Kishi (難波吉士), which Naniwa no Mitsuna, fl. 672) established.

According to Anderson, Abe no Seimei was a descendant of the poet Abe no Nakamaro and a disciple of Kamo no Tadayuki and Kamo no Yasunori, 10th-century diviners of the Heian court. He became Kamo no Yasunori's successor in astrology and divination, while Yasunori's son took on the lesser responsibility of devising the calendar. Seimei's duties included analyzing strange events, conducting exorcisms, warding against evil spirits, and performing various rites of geomancy. He was said to be incredibly skilled in divining the sex of fetuses and finding lost objects. According to the Konjaku Monogatarishu, he correctly predicted the abdication of Emperor Kazan based on his observation of celestial phenomena.

Seimei's reputation grew sufficiently that, from the late 10th century, the Onmyōryō, the government ministry of Onmyōdō, was controlled by the Abe clan. The Kamo clan likewise became the hereditary keepers of the calendar.

The mystical symbol of the central five-pointed star referred to in the West as a pentagram, is known in Japan as the Seiman, the Seal of Abe no Seimei, or the Seimei Kikyō (晴明紋 / 晴明桔梗); this pentacle was originally the personal seal of Abe-no-Seimei, later becoming the symbol for the Onmyōryō (the government ministry department for the practice of Onmyōdō, or the Bureau of Taoist Geomancy) and for Onmyōdō itself, given its association with the Chinese Five Elements.

According to legend, Abe no Seimei was not entirely human. His father, Abe no Yasuna (安倍 保名), was human. Still, his mother, Kuzunoha, was a kitsune (a "fox spirit"). At a very early age, no later than five, he was allegedly able to command weak oni to do his bidding. His mother entrusted Seimei to Kamo no Tadayuki to live a good human life and not become evil himself.

The Heian period, mainly when Seimei lived, was a time of peace. Many of his legends revolve around a series of magical battles with a rival, Ashiya Dōman, who often tried to embarrass Seimei so that he could usurp his position. One noted story involved Dōman and the young Seimei in a divination duel to reveal the contents of a particular box. Dōman had another person put fifteen mandarin oranges into the box and "divined" that there were fifteen oranges in it. Seimei saw through the ruse, metamorphosed the oranges into rats, and stated that fifteen rats were in the box. When the rats were revealed, Dōman was shocked and defeated. It's described that Hakudō Sennin (伯道上人) was Seimei's teacher from China. He had a wife named Rika (梨花) described in the Abe no Seimei Monogatari.

Seimei is involved in numerous other tales as well. He appears as a minor character in the Heike Monogatari and is said to be responsible for divining the location of the Shuten-dōji, a powerful oni purportedly slain by Minamoto no Yorimitsu. He is sometimes said to be the onmyōji who discovered Tamamo-no-Mae's true nature, although the time of the Tamamo-no-Mae story does not coincide with Seimei's lifetime; other sources credit the act to a descendant, Abe no Yasuchika.

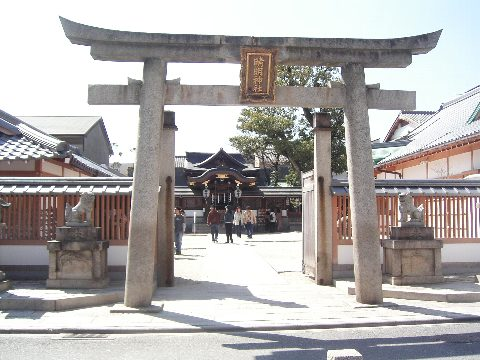
Torii of the Seimei shrine in Kyoto

Seimei's pentagram mon represents the Wu Xing.

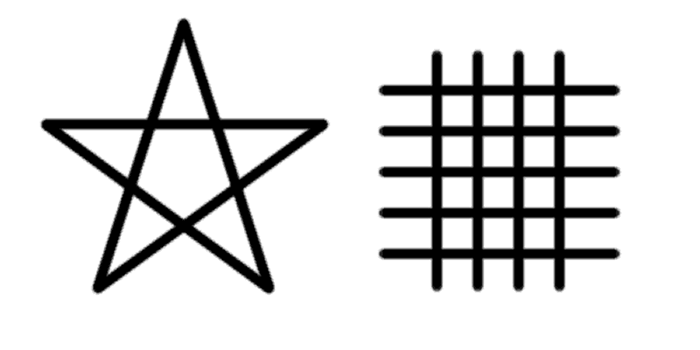
Seiman Dōman amulet, consisting of Seimei's pentagram and Dōman's lattice

Seimei Jinja, a shrine associated with Abe no Seimei, Tsuruga

Sign at Seimei Jinja in Tsuruga, noting that its worship hall holds a "prayer stone" said to have been used by Seimei in his study of Onmyōdō

== Legacy ==
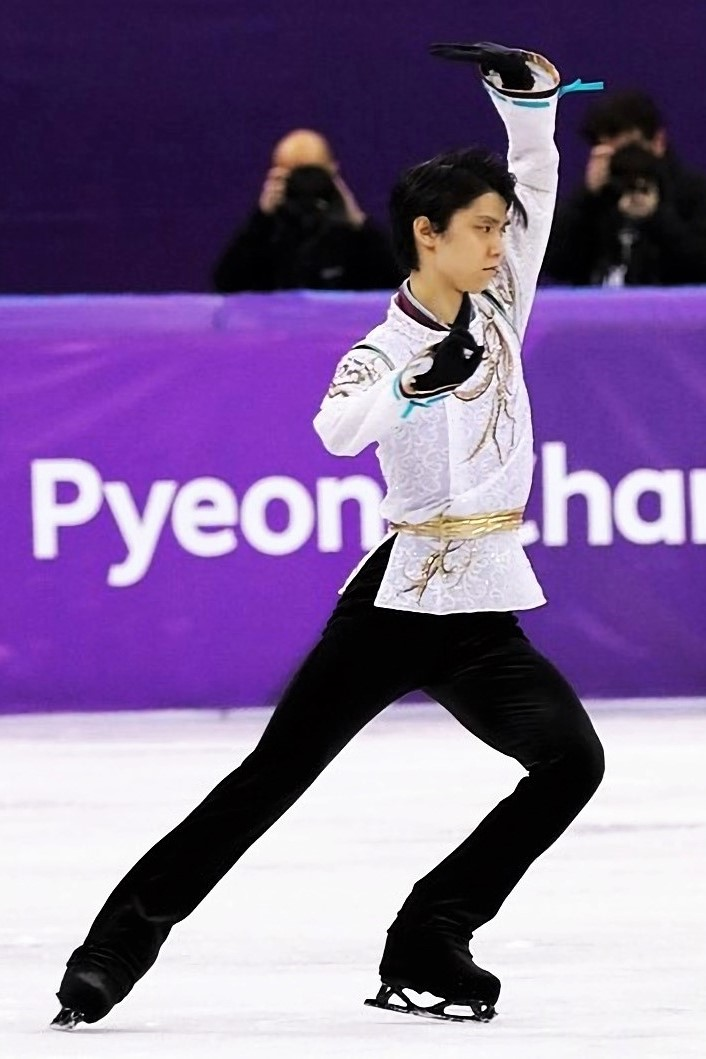
Yuzuru Hanyu in his free skate program Seimei at the 2018 Winter Olympics

After Seimei's death, Emperor Ichijo made a shrine in his honor, the Seimei Jinja was erected at the location of his home in 1007 AD. The original shrine was destroyed in war during the fifteenth century, but it was rebuilt in the same location and still stands today. The Seimei Jinja located in Kyoto attracts fans of Seimei's interpretations in popular culture. In 2005, the shrine was renovated and decorated with pentagrams. The shrine sells amulets with pentagrams and the Chinese bellflower adorning them, associated with Seimei. The shrine is now popular with fans of Seimei-inspired media, such as Okano Reiko's manga.

The asteroid 5541 Seimei, discovered in 1976, is named for him.

Japanese figure skater and two-time Olympic champion Yuzuru Hanyu portrayed Abe no Seimei in his Olympic free skate program Seimei, using the soundtrack of the movies Onmyōji and Onmyōji II. With the program, Hanyu became the first skater across all disciplines to score above 200 points in the free skate and set back-to-back world records in the 2015–16 season. This program also contributed to the win of his second Olympic title in 2018 and the completion of the first career Super Slam in the men's singles discipline in 2020.

Abe no Seimei's origin story would be retold on the Japanese Animation television show Folktales from Japan in episode 83. His story would appear in the third segment of the episode, telling the tale of the meeting of parents and early life known as Doujimaru. It would show how his mother commanded him to become a fortune teller at the capital to help others.

Abe no Seimei was termed the "Merlin the Magician of Japan" by some scholars due to his legends and portrayals in several stories, folklore, and films – also due to the legends of Merlin being a cambion of a demon and a human much like the Kuzunoha legend.

=== Senji Ryakketsu ===
Abe no Seimei is credited with the Senji Ryakketsu, an Onmyōdō primer.

== In fiction ==
His name appears in many works of fiction, often as a helpful, wise man and rarely as an enemy, such as Twin Star Exorcists. There are exceptions, such as Nura: Rise of the Yokai Clan, where Seimei was also a great ayakashi and the Lord of Darkness.

Since 1989, Abe no Seimei has been depicted as a bishōnen.

=== Novels ===
The first modern fictional work credited with bringing back widespread interest to Onmyōdō mysticism in Japan is the 1985 historical fantasy novel Teito Monogatari by Hiroshi Aramata. In the novel's story, two of the primary characters, Yasumasa Hirai and Yasunori Katō, are descendants of Seimei and have inherited all his knowledge. Yasumasa Hirai is a notable example because his appearance is modeled off classic depictions of Seimei, and many of his actions are based on those of Seimei's from stories in the Uji Shūi Monogatari. Yasunori Katō's first name "Yasunori" is derived from the name of Seimei's legendary teacher and he proudly wears Seimei's symbol, the Seiman (five-pointed star), on his gloves and handkerchief. Unlike Hirai, though, Katō's burning hatred for the Japanese Empire has metamorphosed him into an oni. With one in defense of the Empire and one against it, the two men naturally become enemies. The rest of the novel chronicles the battle between their two factions.

In 1988, Baku Yumemakura started a novel series named Onmyōji with Seimei portrayed as a handsome young man who lived in a Heian-period world populated by mysterious beings. Reiko Okano turned this into a manga and became popular with teenage girls. In 2002, an NHK television series was made based on the novels. A version of Abe has also been rendered by acclaimed Taiwanese manga artist Ethan, who has stated that he is a massive fan of the novel. The novels were adapted into an anime by the studio Marvy Jack for Netflix in November 2023.

=== Films ===
The film Onmyōji, starring Mansai Nomura as Seimei, was released in 2001 (2004 in the U.S.) by Pioneer (now Geneon). As with any other work featuring both Seimei and Minamoto no Hiromasa, the film was based on Yumemakura's novels. Despite Yumemakura being involved, the manga adaptation and the movie adaptation are quite different in style and plot.

A sequel, Onmyoji II, was made in 2003.

In 2020, a Chinese film, The Yin-Yang Master: Dream of Eternity, was produced based on an adaptation from Onmyōji written by Baku Yumemakura. Seimei was portrayed by Mark Chao. In the following year, another Chinese film, The Yinyang Master was released. The film is an adaptation of a NetEase game Onmyōji (which in turn is based on the novel series Onmyōji by author Baku Yumemakura). Seimei was portrayed by Chen Kun.

A prequel film, titled The Yin Yang Master Zero (陰陽師0, Onmyōji Zero), starring Kento Yamazaki as Seimei, premiered on April 19, 2024; it was later released worldwide on Amazon Prime Video on October 18 of the same year. The film served as a prequel of Seimei solving a murder mystery at the Onmyoryo before becoming an onmyōji.

=== Television ===
To capitalize on the success of the Onmyōji films, Fuji Television produced a miniseries in 2004, called Onmyoji: Abe no Seimei. This series has no ties to cinematic releases.

=== Manga ===
Hao Asakura's character from Hiroyuki Takei's Shaman King is directly based on Seimei. Hao is the author of a magical book called Chō-Senjiryakketsu, clearly inspired by Seimei's Senji Ryakketsu. They also share facts about their lives, such as their mother being called a demon fox and their ability to create oni since they were young.

Seimei had been shown in a manga called Nurarihyon no Mago by Hiroshi Shiibashi, as a Nue, dark lord of the Ayakashi, born from an evil fox. Nurarihyon no Mago was adapted into an anime series starting in July 2010.

Abe no Seimei also appears in the manga Igyoujin Oniwakamaru as an evil spirit who plans to revive himself to begin his second life and rule over humans and yokai.

He also appeared in Kouta Hirano's Drifters manga series leading a group of magicians called the Octobrist Organization. Appearing as a young man, he has been pulled into an alternate world where various historical figures are summoned, and magicians need their skills and techniques to save their world from destruction. It is mentioned in English dubbed anime of Drifters that Abe no Haruakira was another way to read the kanji of his name.

The main character of the manga series A Terrified Teacher at Ghoul School!, Seimei was the main character's ancestor.

In the manga series Twin Star Exorcists, Seimei was, in fact, a female exorcist no older than thirteen. She was the founder of yang-style exorcism who did away with the King of Kegare (Impurities), creating Magano as a powerful barrier and forcefield. Before shutting herself and her retainers inside, she turned to her disciple Doujimaru and granted him some of her powers. This Doujimaru that modern times know as 'Abe no Seimei'. (The truth about Seimei being female is known only to a few characters in-universe). In contrast to the source material, however, the second half of its anime adaptation with its completely original story in comparison to the source has Seimei still be male. He serves as the final antagonist of the anime-only storyline, with his plans to use the Cataclysm King that is Rokuro to cleanse humanity by erasing humanity's free will.

In the manga series Gintama, Ketsuno Seimei is directly based on Seimei. Ketsuno Seimei is the current leader of the Ketsuno Clan, responsible for protecting the Bakufu and Edo by foretelling disasters and ill omens. For this, he has 1000 of his shikigami all around Edo as his "eyes" and he can also summon a fox-like shikigami called Kuzunoha based on the Abe No Seimei's mother. He is as a major character in Diviner Arc (Gintama Vol. 32 - 33, ch. 282 - 289).

=== Anime ===
Seimei can be seen in the anime Magical Shopping Arcade Abenobashi, released in 2004 in the U.S. by ADV Films. The show's focus was on the Onmyoji practice of changing events to avoid an ill occurrence and the misadventures of two youths. Seimei also appears in the anime Gintama as an onmyoji, and in the anime Shonen Onmyouji which is about his grandson. Seimei is a central character in the anime called Otogi Zoshi.

Seimei appears in the anime New Getter Robo as the leader of the villainous oni.

The second season of the anime Garo: The Animation features a female Abe no Seimei as its protagonist.

He also appears in the anime Fukigen no Mononokean with Ashiya as his companion rather than his rival.

Seimei plays a role in the Midnight Occult Civil Servants anime, about mild-mannered civil servants in Tokyo's Shinjuku ward who secretly manage a huge population of fairies and other magical creatures.

Onmyoji, an original net animation adaptation by Netflix, directed by Soubi Yamamoto and produced by Marvy Jack, released on Netflix on November 28, 2023.

=== Games ===
The horror/survival PlayStation 2 video game Kuon featured Seimei as a female exorcist who becomes a playable character near the end of the game.

In PlayStation 2 and Xbox video game Otogi 2: Immortal Warriors, Seimei, depicted as a female exorcist, appears as a playable character and boss.

Abe no Seimei was made a playable character in the PlayStation 4, PlayStation Portable, Xbox One, and Wii U versions of Warriors Orochi 3.

Seimei appears in the video game Toukiden: The Age of Demons as a mitama (a hero's soul from Japanese history).

In Part 1.5 of the mobile game Fate/Grand Order, Seimei's name is claimed as an undercover pseudonym used by Ashiya Dōman in the Shimōsa story chapter. Later, Seimei indirectly appears briefly in Part 2's Heian-kyō story chapter as an ally to the protagonist.

Onmyoji, a mobile game, featured Abe no Seimei as the protagonist who summons various Shikigami to ward off demons alongside his onmyoji comrades.

In Dragalia Lost, Seimei plays a part as head of the Ox Clan, one of the twelve Hinomotoan clans serving Amaterasu, with his soul pact dragon Gozu Tennō and his kitsune disciple Kuzunoha.

Seimei appears as an NPC in the video game Nioh 2. Despite being from the Heian period, he strangely appears during the Sengoku era to train the players in the art of Onmyō magic. It is later revealed in the DLC "Darkness in the Capital" that this individual was an avatar created by the real Seimei, who had sacrificed himself alongside Minamoto no Yorimitsu to seal away Shuten Dōji and Tamamo-no-Mae within Byōdō-in during the Heian period.

Seimei appears in the PlayStation Vita game Oreshika: Tainted Bloodlines as the main villain of the game, a priest who places a curse on the main characters that shortens their lifespan to only two years.

In the video game Octopath Traveler II, the Conjurer advanced job wears a typical onmyoji attire and seems to be heavily inspired by Seimei.

=== Manhwa ===
He is briefly mentioned as a constellation in the South Korean franchise Omniscient Reader's Viewpoint.
