= Tengenjutsu (fortune telling) =

Traditional Japanese fortune-telling method

Tengenjutsu (Japanese: 天源術) is a Japanese fortune telling method. It is based on yin and yang and the five elements, and uses a person's birth date in the sexagenary cycle and physical appearance to predict one's fate. Tengenjutsu originated in various Chinese practices, but was first systemized by the early Edo period monk Tenkai. It is also the origin of Tōkyūjutsu.

== See also ==
- Futomani
- Itako
- Kokkuri
- Omikuji
- Onmyōdō
- Sanpaku
