= Seimei Shrine =

Shinto shrines in Kyoto, Japan

- 晴明神社
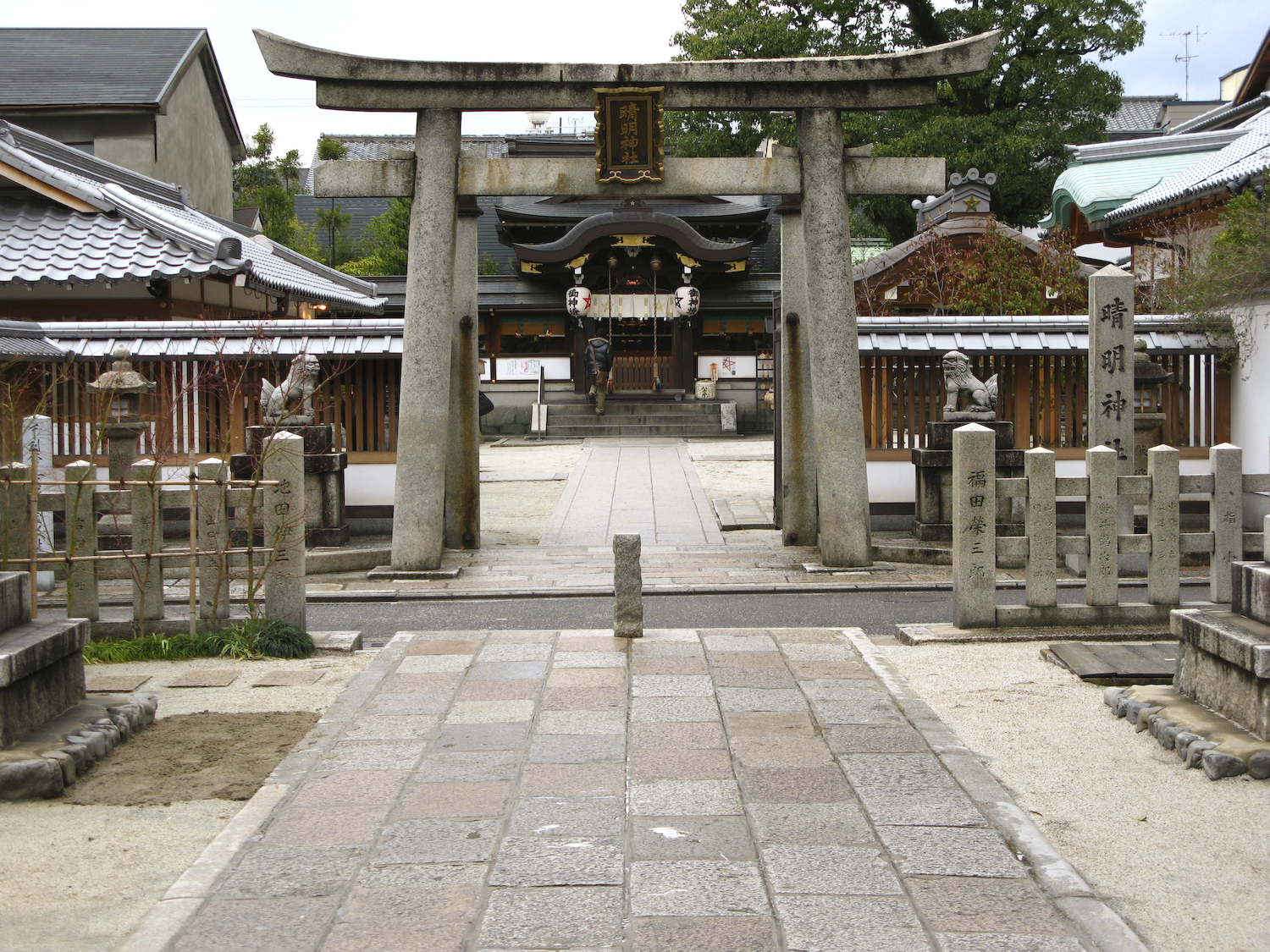
- Torii gate at entrance to Seimei Shrine

- Location within Japan

Religion
- Affiliation: Shinto
- Deity: Abe no Seimei

Location
- Location: 806 Ichijō-agaru, Horikawa-dōri, Kamigyō-ku, Kyōto-shi, Kyōto-ken 〒 602-8222
- Interactive map of Seimei Shrine
- Coordinates: 35°01′40″N 135°45′04″E

Architecture
- Founder: Emperor Ichijō
- Established: 1007

Website
- www.seimeijinja.jp

Seimei Shrine (晴明神社, Seimei-jinja) is a Shinto shrine that is located in Kyoto, Japan. It is dedicated to the onmyōji Abe no Seimei.

== History ==
The Seimei Shrine was founded on the 4th year of the Kankō era (1007) by Emperor Ichijō, who ordered the shrine built in memory of Abe no Seimei, after his death in 1005. It was constructed on the site of Abe no Seimei's house.

The main building was restored in 1925.

== Architecture ==
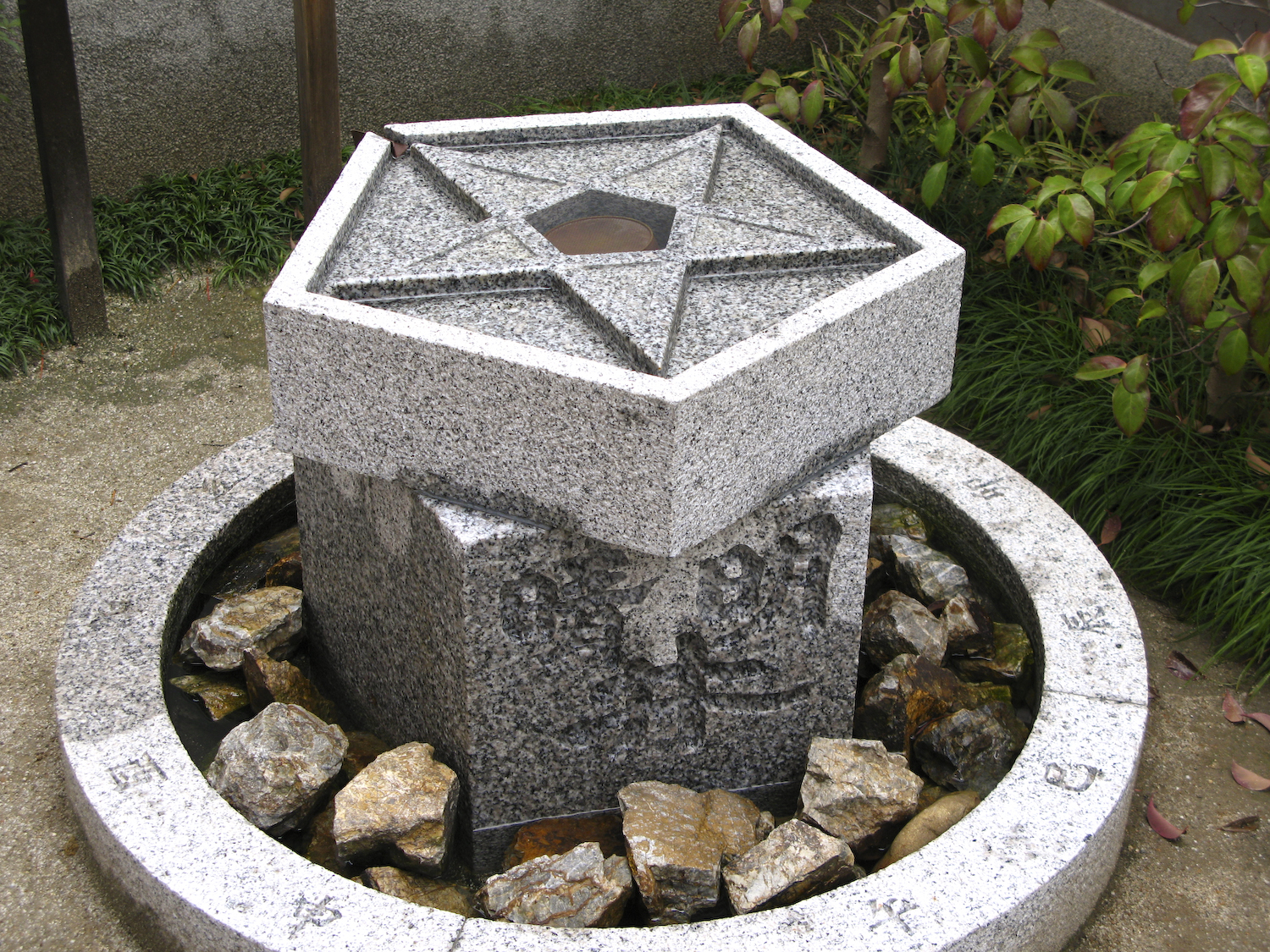
Seimei-i well with pentagram motif

Two torii gates lead up to the entrance of the shrine.

A famous well (Seimei-i) is located on the shrine grounds, and the water drawn from it is considered somewhat magical. Tea master Sen no Rikyū was known to have brewed tea with the water from this well.

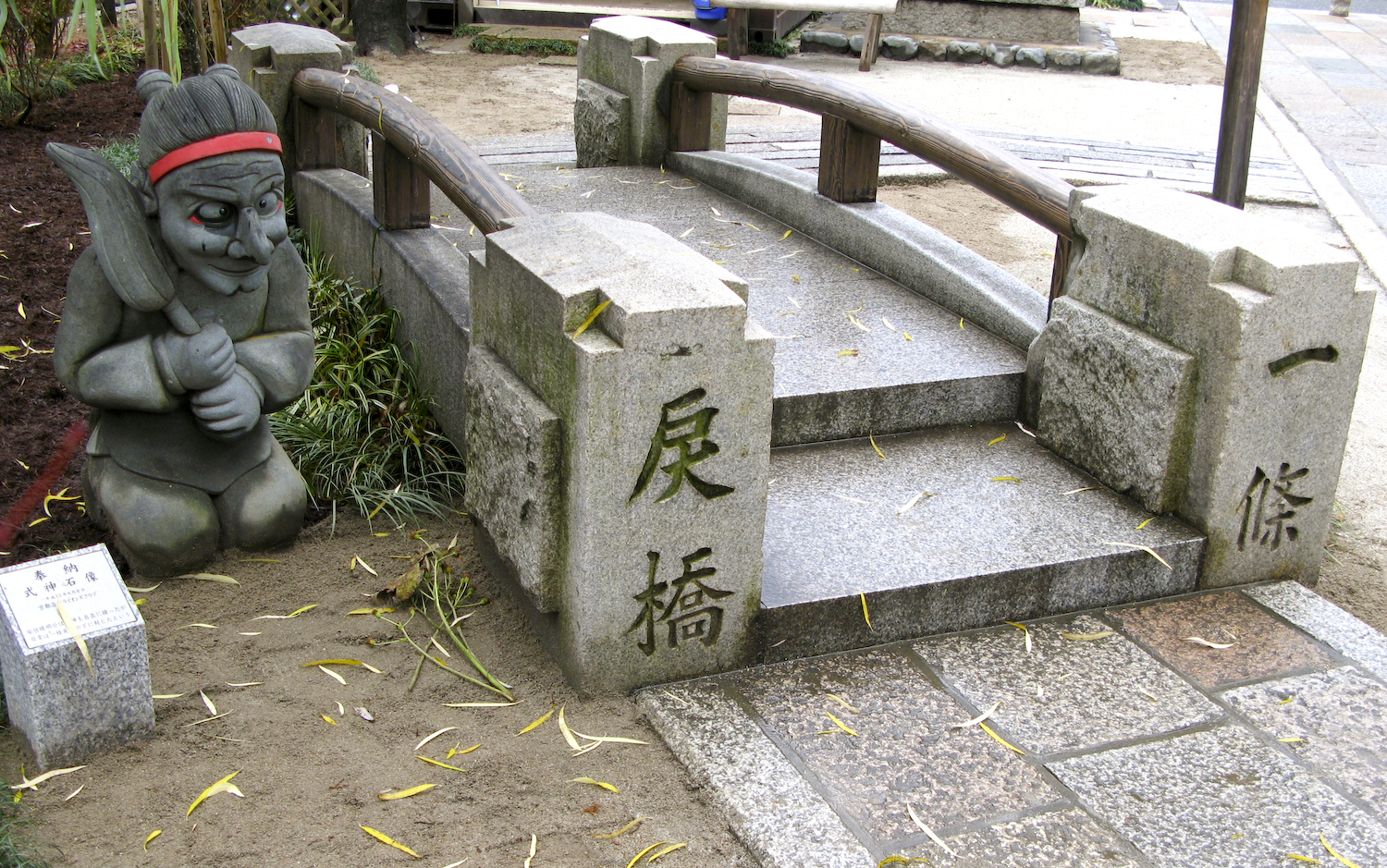
Ichijō Modori-bashi

The pentacle, known locally as a Seimei-star, is an important symbol found on many parts of the shrine. Abe no Seimei reputedly came up with the arcane insignia in the 10th century, symbolizing the Five Chinese Elements. Japanese bellflower (Platycodon grandiflorus) ornamentation are found in decorative tiles and lanterns. The five petal tips of the flower are thought to represent the same ideal as the pentagram.

A nearby bridge, the Ichijō Modori-bashi is situated just south of the shrine, and is held to be a gateway between the human and spiritual realms.

== Festivals ==
The Seimei Festival (晴明祭) is held every year on the autumnal equinox.

== Images ==
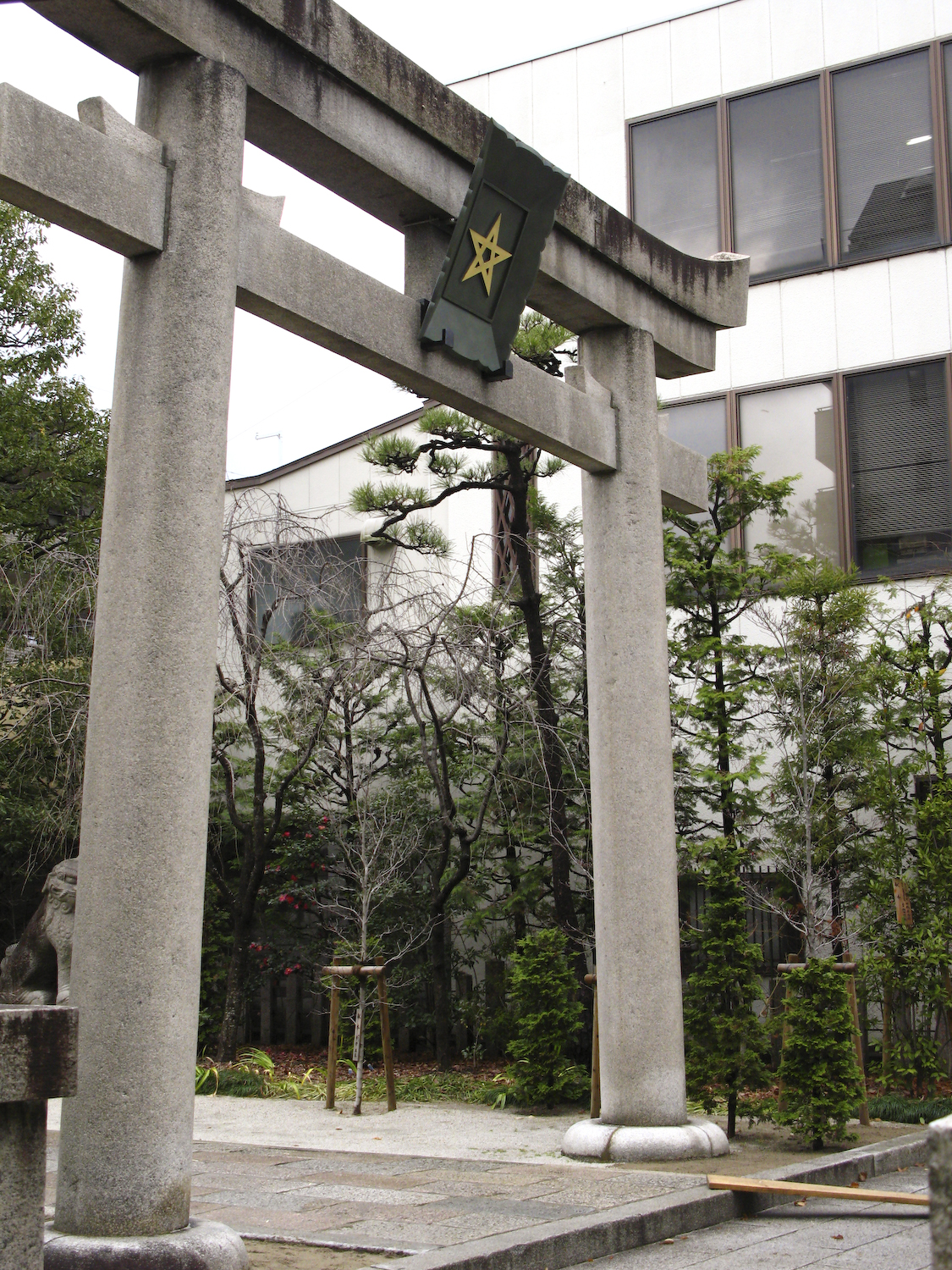
Torii with pentacle

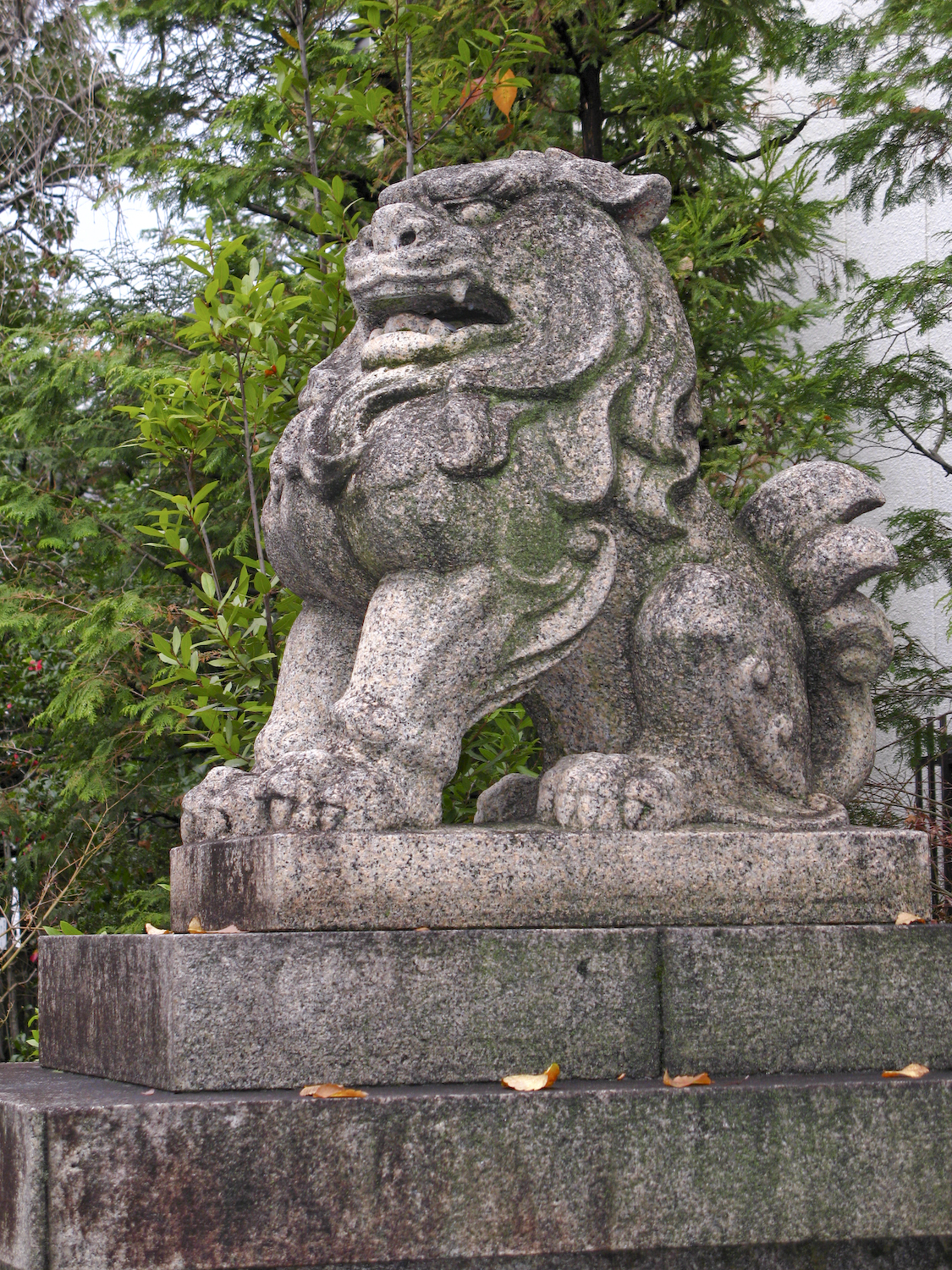
Stone lion

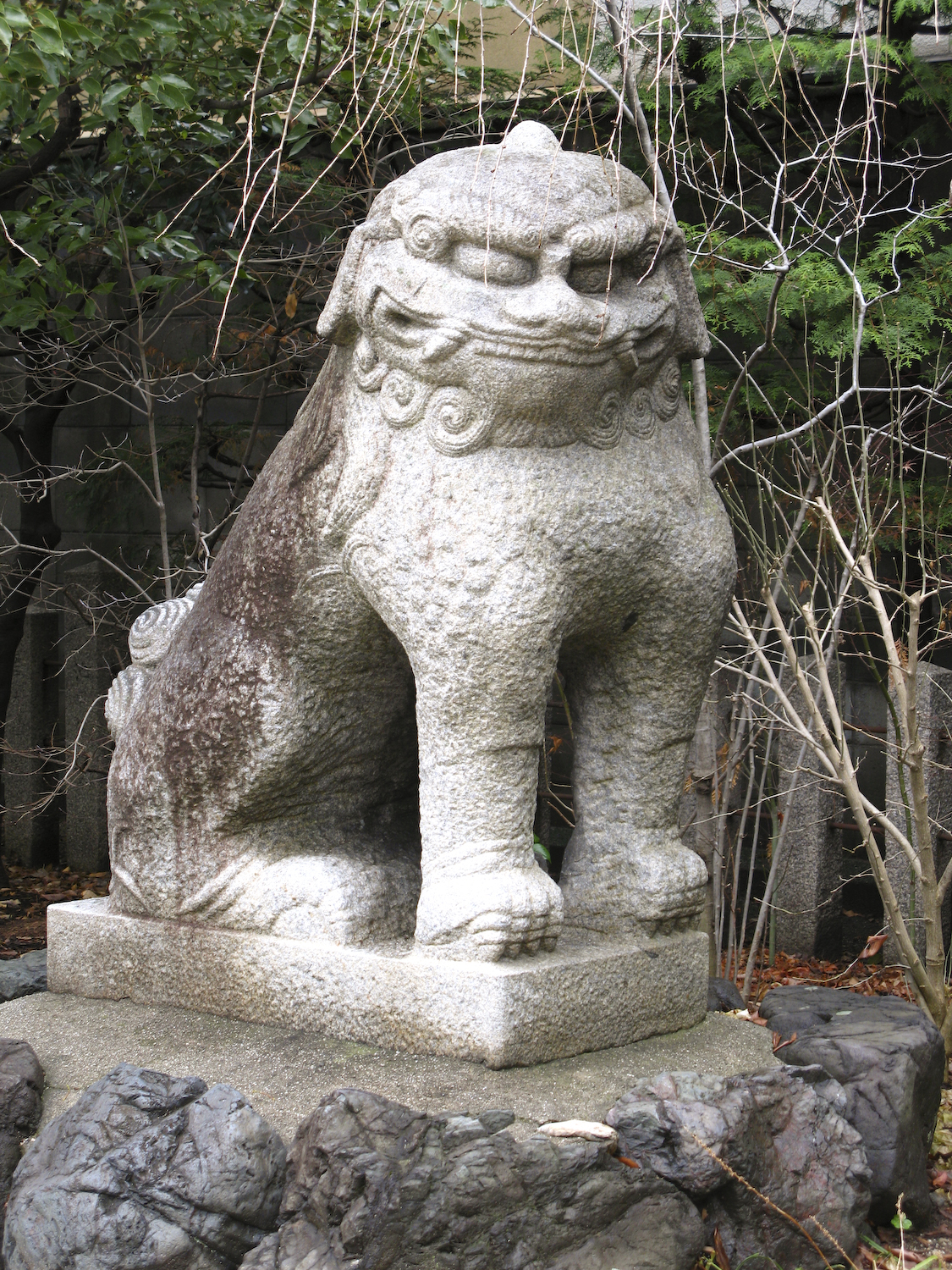
Stone komainu

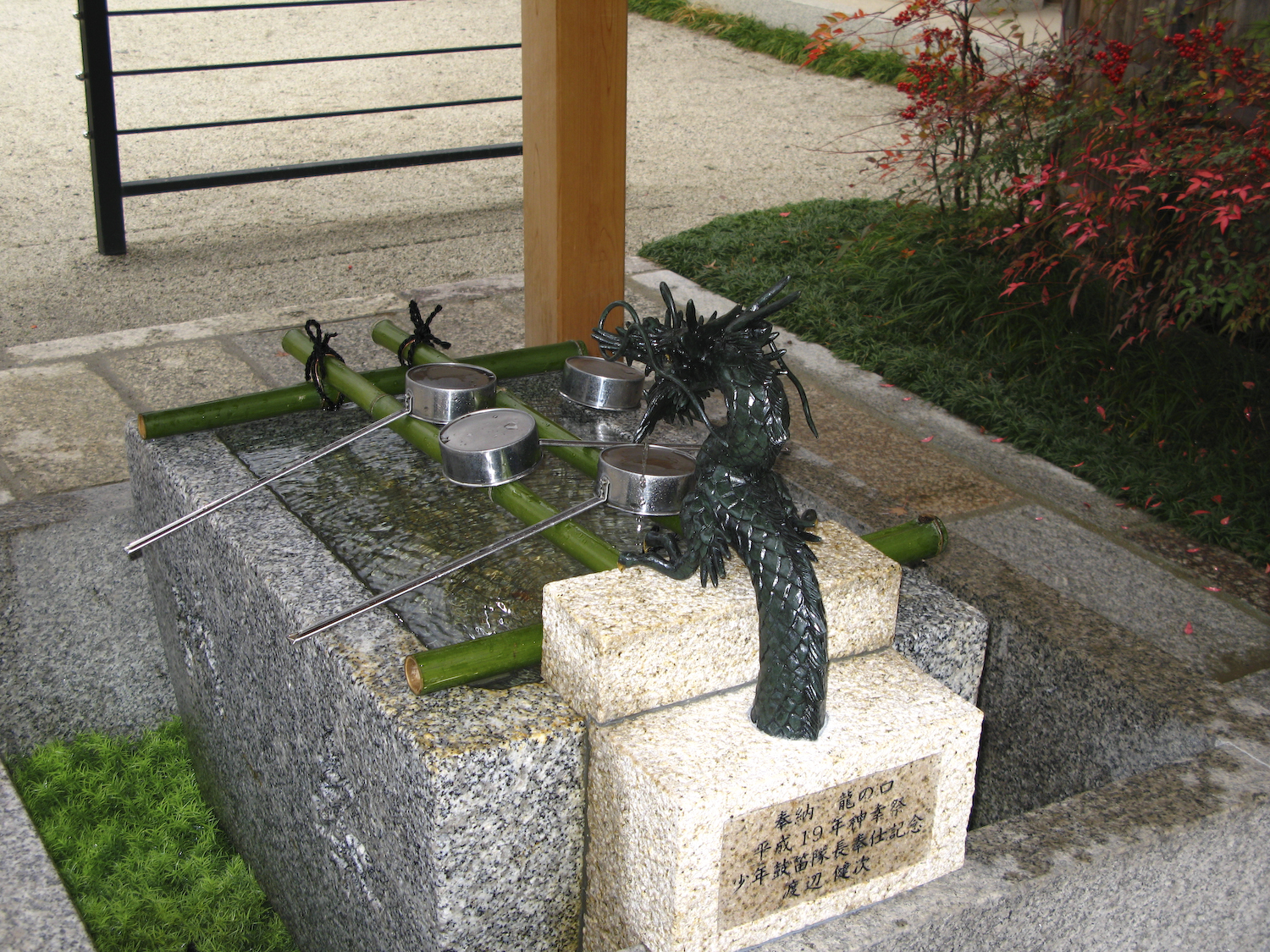
Chōzuya

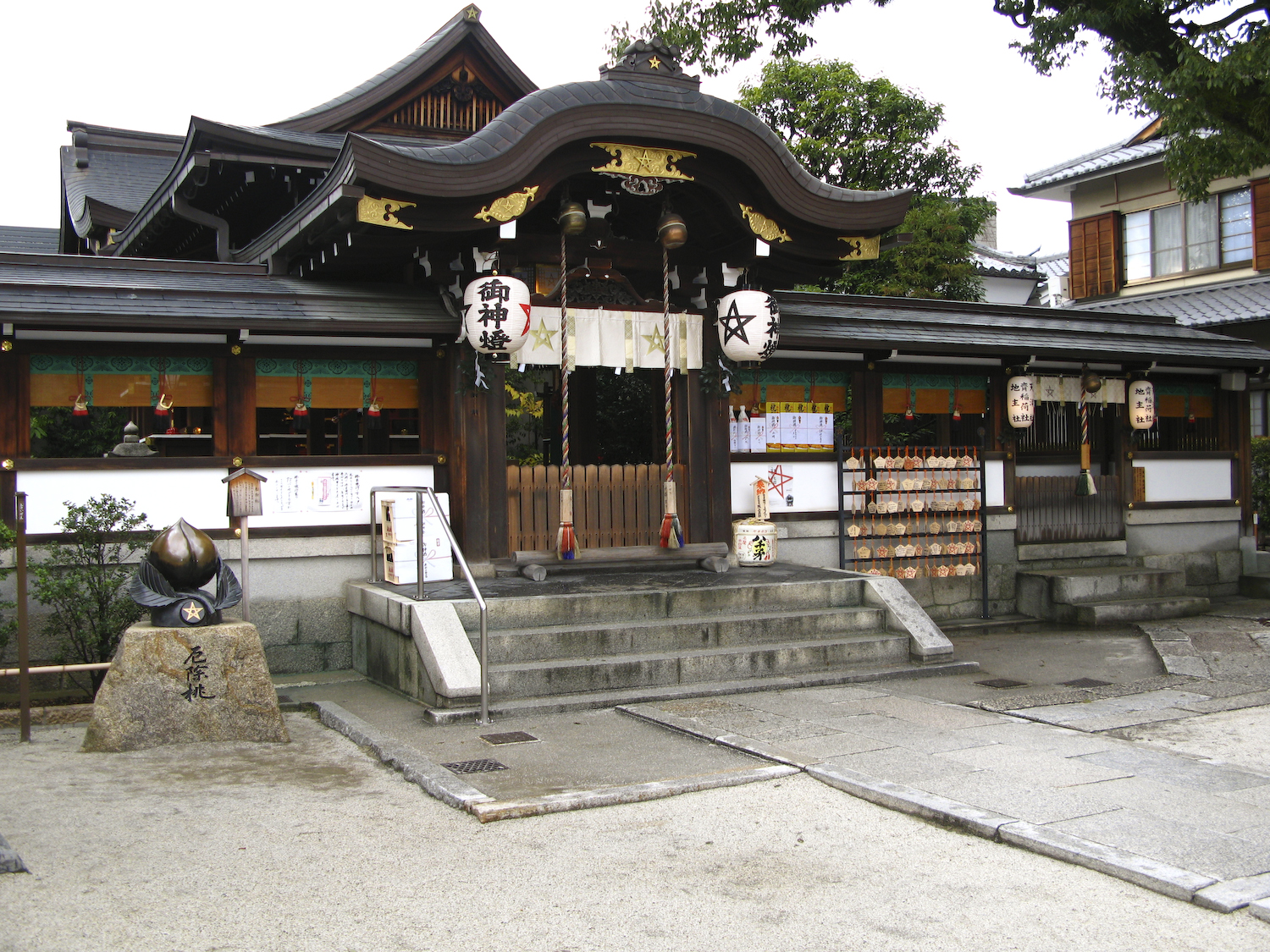
Front shrine

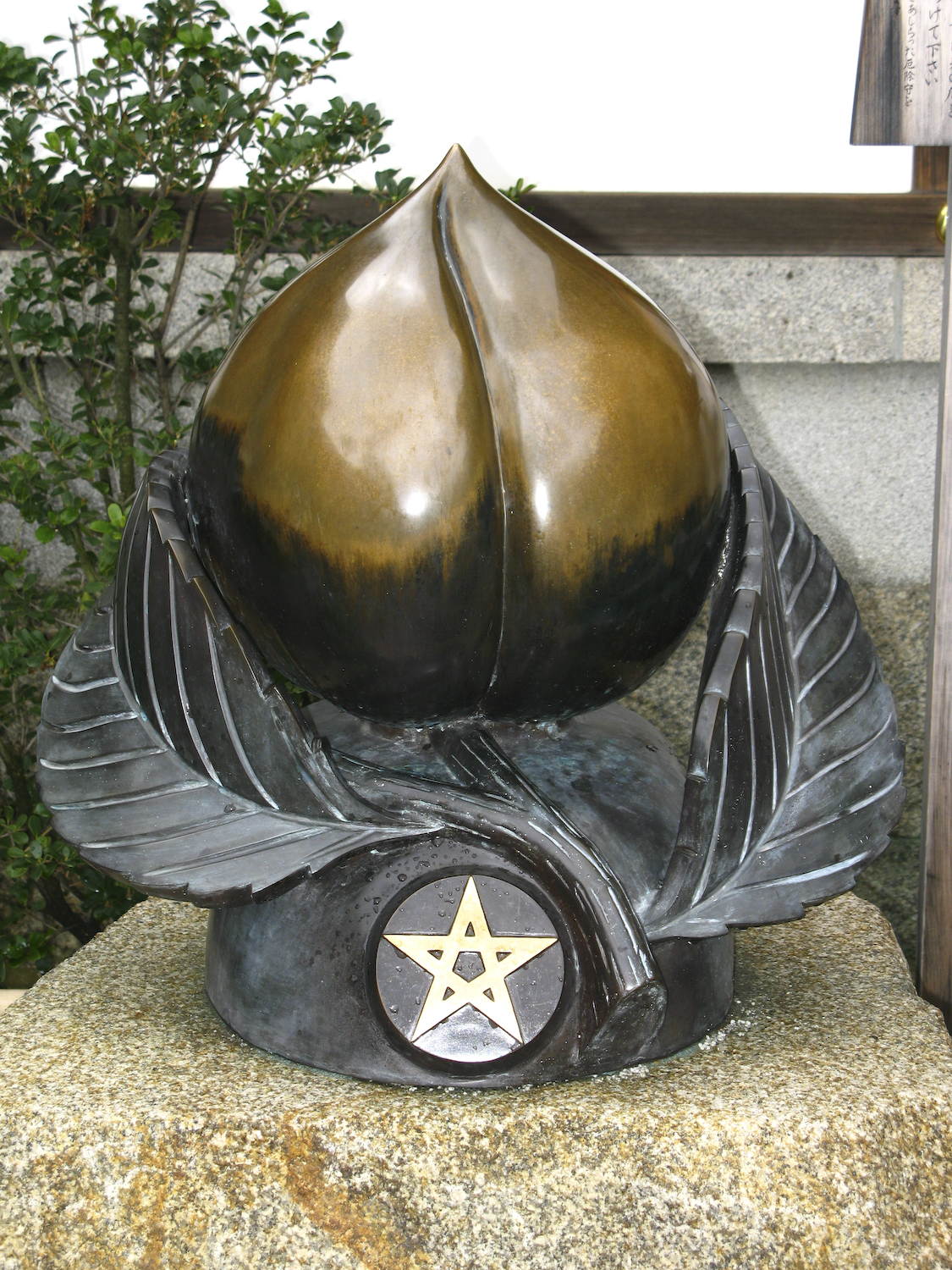
Peach bust

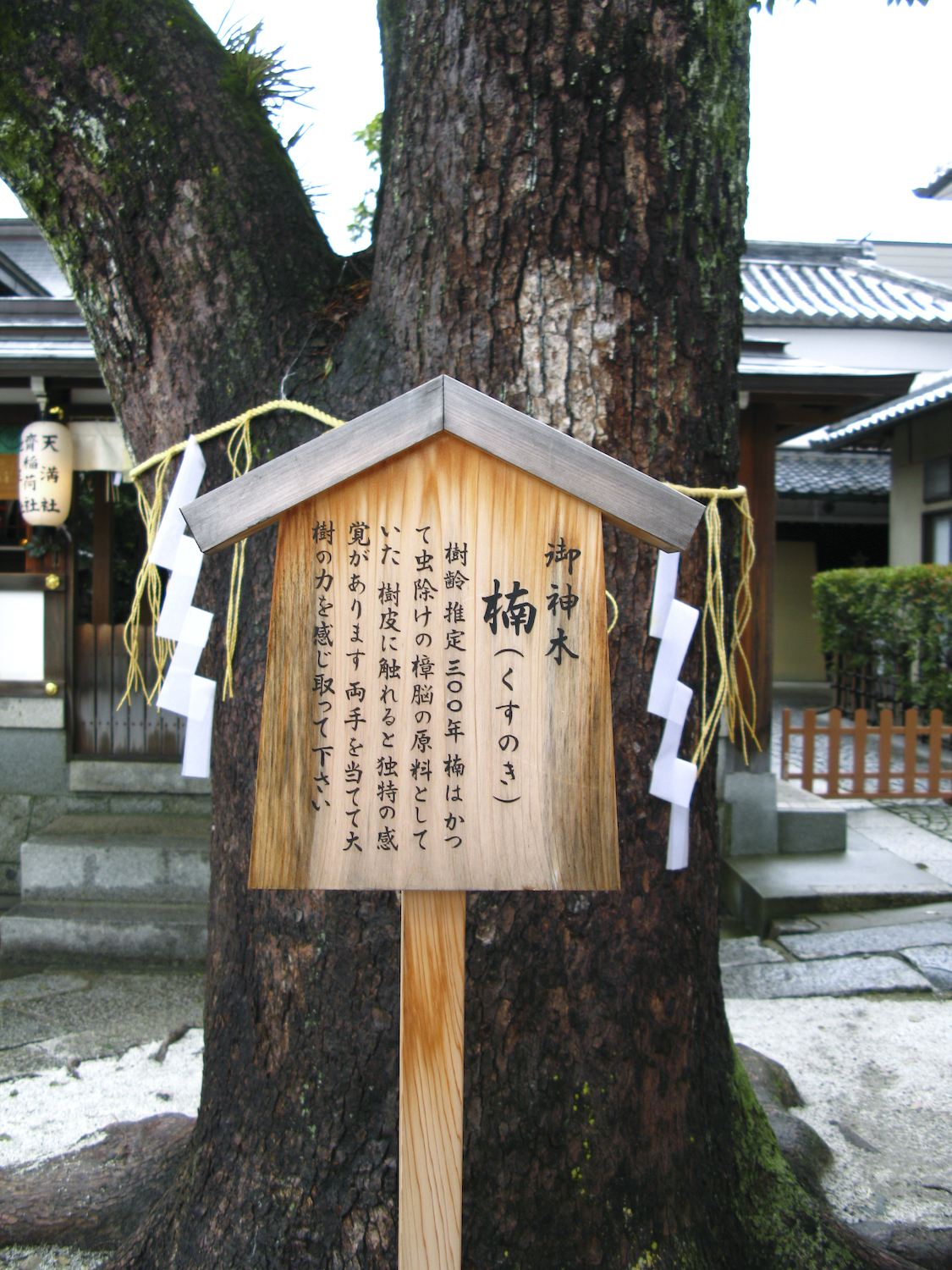
Kusu-no-ki, a sacred tree

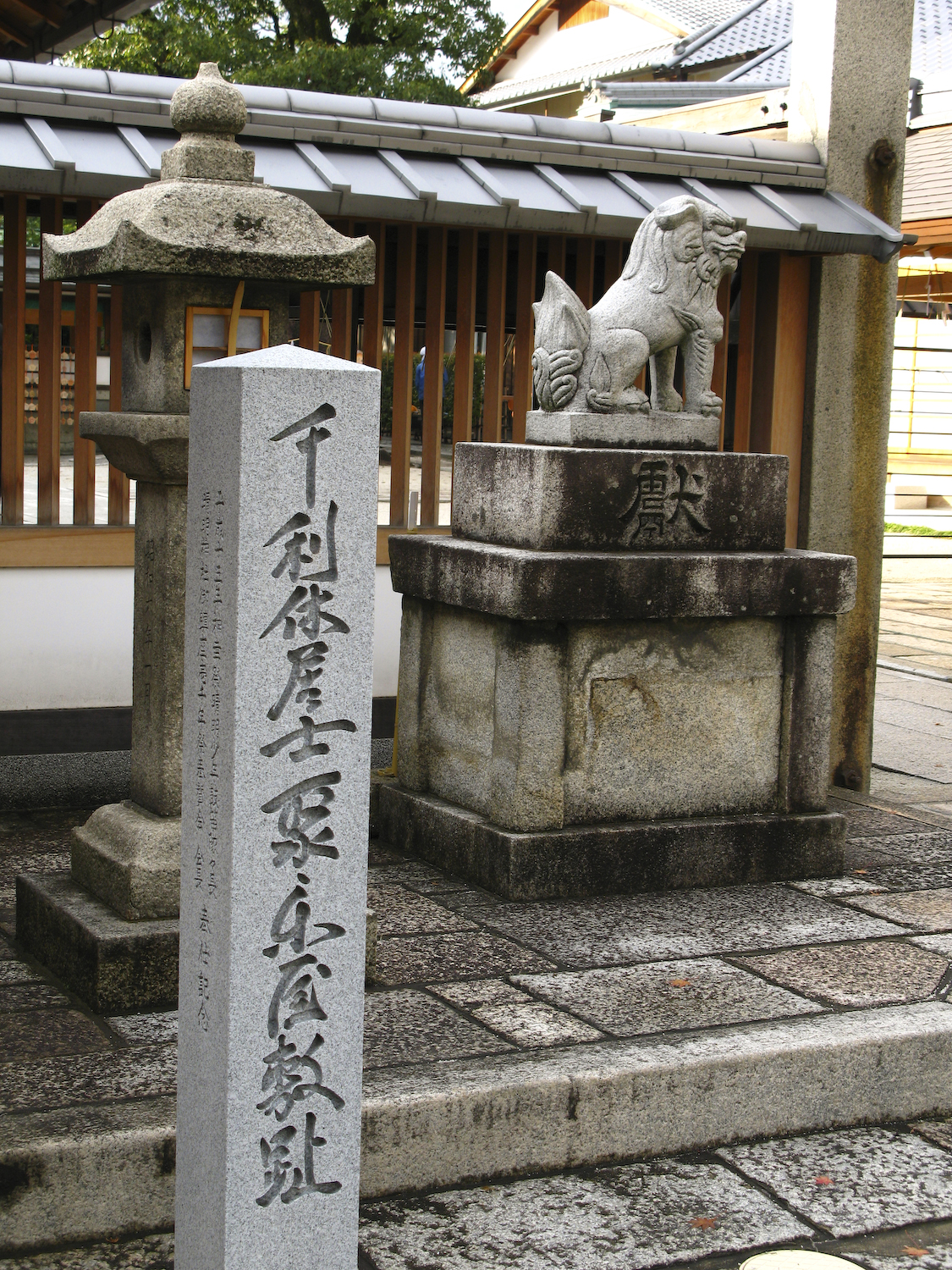
Stone tablet for Sen no Rikyū

== See also ==
- Abe no Seimei
- Onmyōdō
