= Tokyo: The Last Megalopolis =

- Theatrical poster
- Directed by: Akio Jissoji
- Screenplay by: Kaizo Hayashi
- Based on: Teito Monogatari by Hiroshi Aramata
- Produced by: Takashige Ichise; Akio Jissoji
- Starring: Shintaro Katsu; Kyūsaku Shimada; Mieko Harada; Junichi Ishida
- Cinematography: Masao Nakabori
- Edited by: Keniichi Uraoka
- Music by: Maki Ishii
- Production company: Exe
- Distributed by: Toho
- Release date: January 30, 1988
- Running time: 135 minutes
- Country: Japan
- Language: Japanese
- Budget: ¥1,000,000,000 ($8,000,000)
- Box office: ¥1,790,000,000

Tokyo: The Last Megalopolis (Japanese: 帝都物語, Hepburn: Teito Monogatari) is a 1988 Japanese epic tokusatsu historical dark fantasy/science fiction film directed by Akio Jissoji, produced by "Exe" studios and distributed by Toho Studios. It is the first cinematic adaptation of the award-winning historical fantasy novel Teito Monogatari by Hiroshi Aramata. The film stars Kyūsaku Shimada, Shintaro Katsu, Kōji Takahashi, Jo Shishido, Junichi Ishida, Mieko Harada, Kō Nishimura, and Shirō Sano among others. With a budget of around 1 billion yen (roughly $8 million), the movie was one of the most expensive live action Japanese special effects films to have been produced during that decade (by contrast, the internationally released 1984 film The Return of Godzilla was only budgeted at $6.25 million).

The movie went on to become a notable success in Japan. It was one of the top ten highest grossing domestic motion pictures of 1988. It continues to be regarded in the country as a respected cult film. A sequel, Tokyo: The Last War, was released the following year.

== Plot ==
The movie begins in 1912 with Yasumasa Hirai explaining to Baron Eiichi Shibusawa Tokyo's long history as one of the most haunted cities in all of Japan. He specifically warns Shibusawa that the vengeful spirit of Taira no Masakado, an ancient villain, must not be disturbed, as its spirit is powerful enough to destroy the city. In response to this heeding, Shibusawa allows the Tsuchimikado sect (土御門一門) to advise him on how to make Tokyo a blessed city. However, both Hirai's and Shibusawa's efforts are opposed by the oni Yasunori Kato, a former lieutenant in the Imperial Army, who wants to destroy Tokyo by awakening Masakado's spirit. To do this, he attempts to kidnap Yukari Tatsumiya, the descendant of Masakado, to use as a medium to communicate with the spirit. However, his plans are brought to attention to the Tsuchimikado by Koda Rohan. Hirai and his followers lock Yukari inside the Tsuchimikado temple and perform the monoimi (物忌) ceremony to defend her. Kato and his followers launch a frontal assault against the temple with shikigami. Kato escapes with Yukari and uses her as a medium, but Masakado rejects his offer. Ogai Mori diagnoses Yukari as pregnant with Kato's child. Emperor Meiji passes away, marking the end of the Meiji Era. In a dramatic display of devotion to the Meiji Emperor, Hirai commits seppuku. His act divines the year of Tokyo's destruction; 1923, the Year of the Pig.

The narrative moves to 1923, Tokyo. Kato retreats to Dairen, and he and his followers use magic to cause artificial seismic waves under Dairen that echo through the Earth to Japan. Kato returns to Tokyo to awaken Masakado's spirit by himself, but is interrupted by Koda Rohan and Junichi Narutaki, who use the Chart of Eight Directions (八陣圖), a form of Kimon Tonko sorcery, in an attempt to trap him. Kato escapes, but fails to awaken Masakado. The seismic waves generated in Dairen reach Japan, and the Great Kanto Earthquake is stimulated.

The setting moves to 1927. Torahiko Terada has been appointed by Noritsugu Hayakawa as manager of the construction of Japan's first Tokyo Metro Ginza Line. Hayakawa's construction workers run into Kato's shikigami provoking Terada to seek out the aid of Dr. Makoto Nishimura to use his creation Gakutensoku to finish construction for them. Masakado summons Keiko Mekata, a miko, to defend his grave from Kato. Keiko joins forces with feng shui master Shigemaru Kuroda, who discovers the location of Kato's hideout. While Kuroda fights an Asura statue guarding the place, Keiko rushes to stop Kato, but Kato summons his gohō dōji to fend her off. Kato attempts to awaken Masakado through Yukari's child, Yukiko, but even this is unsuccessful. Keiko explains to Kato that Yukiko is not his child, but rather the result of an incestuous union between Yukari and her brother Yoichiro making her uncontrollable by Kato. Gakutensoku self-destructs, cutting off the dragon vein connected to Kato's temple. Kato tries to use onmyodo magic one last time to stimulate an earthquake, but this is insufficient and he is severely wounded from the effort. Though his plans are foiled, Kato kidnaps Keiko and takes her with him to Manchuria. The film ends amidst another annual district wide festival celebrating the birth of the capital. The Tatsumiya Family hopes for Keiko's return while Kyoka Izumi predicts Kato's return.

== Cast ==
- Shintaro Katsu as Eiichi Shibusawa: The famous industrialist who pioneered Western capitalism in Japan's economy. In the story, he is head of the Tokyo Improvement Project, an ambitious enterprise calling upon the minds of specialists from a variety of fields, with the ultimate goal of making Tokyo the most powerful city in East Asia.
- Kyūsaku Shimada as Yasunori Kato: An evil sorcerer wielding the power of several long dead mystics (such as Abe no Seimei) who wants to destroy Tokyo and cripple the Japanese Empire in order to fulfill a 2000-year-old curse.
- Mieko Harada as Keiko Tatsumiya: A shrine maiden summoned by the spirit of Taira no Masakado to defend the Tatsumiya Family.
- Junichi Ishida as Yoichiro Tatsumiya: An official in the Ministry of Finance. He is the direct descendant of Taira no Masakado, the husband of Keiko Tatsumiya, the brother of Yukari Tatsumiya and the secret father of Yukiko Tatsumiya.
- Shirō Sano as Junichi Narutaki: The close friend of Yoichiro Tatsumiya, he is in love with Yoichiro's sister, Yukari. He participates in the defense of the city by fighting with the Tsuchimikado Clan against Kato as well as joining Koda Rohan in the defense of Masakado's grave.
- Kōji Takahashi as Koda Rohan: The famous writer of the Meiji era whose work contributed to the reformation of modern Japanese literature and who also was a renowned scholar of the supernatural. Determined to stop Kato and protect Yukari, he joins the Tsuchimikado Clan as a student of the onmyoji. After the death of Yasumasa Hirai, he spends several years mastering the secret mystical techniques for the purpose of defending Tokyo. During the Year of the Boar, he attempts to halt Kato's advance to Masakado's grave.
- Haruka Sugata as Yukari Tatsumiya: The sister of Yoichiro and also a direct descendant of Taira no Masakado and a psychic. Due to her heritage and supernatural abilities, Kato abducts her and uses her as a medium to communicate with the spirit of Masakado. She gives birth to Yukiko Tatsumiya, who is believed to be the result of Kato using his magic on her, but revealed later to be the consequence of a secret incestuous encounter between her and her brother.
- Kō Nishimura as Makoto Nishimura: The renowned biologist who invented Japan's first functional robot, Gakutensoku. In the story, he uses his creation to help finish the construction of Japan's first subway tunnel. In the film, Makoto is portrayed by his real-life son, Kō Nishimura.
- Ken Teraizumi as Torahiko Terada: The famous physicist and essayist renowned for his eccentric ideas, wide range of studies and considered the father of "nonlinear physics" in Japan. At the Tokyo Improvement Project committee, he suggests the radical concept of creating an underground city as a backup plan in the event earthquakes should strike. He is laughed off by the other members. Later however, Noritsugu Hayakawa hears of his reputation and appoints him as one of the heads of the construction of Japan's first subway system.
- Mikijiro Hira as Yasumasa Hirai: A master onmyoji who is leader of the Tsuchimikado Clan and the direct descendant of the legendary Abe no Seimei. For the first part of the story, he serves as the primary foil to Yasunori Kato, having all his knowledge and understanding of his magics. After the death of the Meiji Emperor, he performs a fatal act of divination to predict year of Tokyo's destruction.
- Sanshi Katsura as Shigemaru Kuroda: A Feng Shui expert, who in investigating strange spiritual disturbances beneath Tokyo. He serves as Keiko's assistant in the final battle against Kato.
- Jo Shishido as Noritsugu Hayakawa: The businessman who founded Japan's first underground railroad system. During construction of the railway, his engineers run afoul of shikigami set by Kato. Faced with this obstruction, Hayakawa must seek out aid to see his project go through to completion.
- Katsuo Nakamura as Ogai Mori: Legendary writer and surgeon in the Japanese army. In the story, he performs an unsuccessful abortion on Yukari Tatsumiya after she has supposedly been impregnated with Kato's child.
- Tamasaburo Bando V as Izumi Kyoka: Mysterious writer and fortune teller with cryptic information about Keiko's destiny. Legendary Kabuki performer Bando V is a noted Izumi Kyoka scholar who has produced many plays based on his works.

Other cast members include Seiko Ito as Wajiro Kon, Hideji Ōtaki as Oda Kanno, Hisashi Igawa as Ryokichi Tagami and Ai Yasunaga as Azusa Nishimura. Hiroshi Aramata does a cameo as a brasserie client.

== Production ==
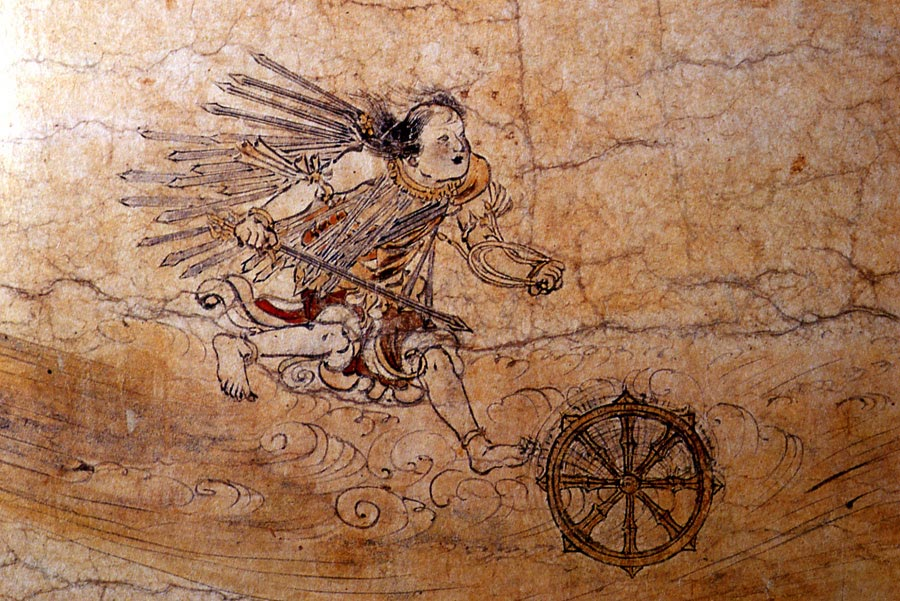
A classic illustration of a Gohō dōji from the Shigisan-engi. Swiss artist H. R. Giger contributed a unique design of the creature for the film.

When producer Takashige Ichise finished The Legend of the Stardust Brothers in 1984, the Saison Group provided funding, which led to Ichise becoming an employee of Seibu Department Store. From there, he transitioned to the movie studio EXE. A colleague at the studio suggested to him the idea of producing Teito Monogatari for their next motion picture. Ichise went on to recruit director Akio Jissoji for the project.

At the time, the Seibu Department Store was holding an exhibition for the works of Swiss artist H. R. Giger. Giger was visiting Japan at the time, and Ichise personally asked to provide designs for the film's creatures, to which he agreed. Originally, he showed interest in working directly on set, however his schedule would not permit it. His main contribution was the conceptual art for the gohō dōji.

Ichise alongside Koji Tsutsumi (the son of Seiji Ttutsumi), pitched the idea to Toho Studios to distribute the picture. According to reports, the proposal was laughed at by Toho executives, who didn't think the film was practical.

The script was originally written by screenwriter Kishida Rio, who was recommended by Akio Jissoji. However Ichise did not think Rio's script was entertaining enough. Instead Ichise recruited screenwriter Kaizo Hayashi to write the script. The two stayed at the Wakaba Inn in Kagurazuka and worked on the script together. Hayashi was asked to make a "picture scroll-like film with a star studded cast". It was also written in the spirit of a New Year's movie. Hayashi was inspired by the Toei Studios gangster film Junko's Retirement Memorial Film: Kanto Hizakura Ikka, one of his favorite movies.

Many staff members who worked on the Ultraman television series were involved in the production, including director Akio Jissoji, cinematographer Masao Nakahori, and special effects director Minoru Nakano. Minoru Nakano reportedly stated that he saw Tokyo: The Last Megalopolis as representing an evolution in traditional Eiji Tsuburaya tokusatsu special effects.

The movie was the first Japanese motion picture to employ Sony HDVS equipment for filming, make it the country's first full-scale high definition VFX film. Approximately six minutes of the final movie was filmed using this technology.

Casting for the role of Yasunori Kato proved difficult. Ichise and Hayashi had originally planned on casting stage actor Kyusaku Shimada, based on his performance on the Tokyo Grand Guignol stage adaptation of the novel. However Toho Studios objected to the idea, and requested a more renowned actor play the role. Ryuichi Sakamoto along with other actors were considered. Eventually actor Kaoru Kobayashi was selected. Ichise and director Akio Jissoji went to meet Kobayashi at the ANA Hotel in Tokyo. During the meeting, Kobayashi bombarded Jissoji with questions about Kato's character such as what "Why does he [Kato] want to destroy Tokyo?" and "What is Kato's spiritual background?" Jissoji responded that the character "was like Godzilla" and didn't have such a background. Later, Kobayashi's agency contacted Ichise and Jissoji to decline the role.

In the meantime, many well known stars joined the cast including Shintaro Katsu, Mikijiro Hira, Junichi Ishida, Mieko Harada, and Tamasaburo Bando. Toho Studios informed Ichise since the film had enough stars, Kato could be played by anyone at this point. Hence Ichise went on to recruit Kyusaku Shimada for the role. At the time, Shimada had left stage acting and had returned to his original job as a gardener When offered the role, Shimada's requested he speak with his boss first. Shimada's boss advised him to pursue acting instead, and then Shimada formally accepted the offer. Shimada read the script and was perplexed by it. He admitted that the work would have been much more successful as a long historical drama than a 2 hour movie. However he also thought the movie successfully captured the zeitgeist and enthusiasm of Japan's 80's bubble economy.

Director Akio Jissoji had conflicts with Kyusaku Shimada on set. The production was plagued by many accidents. The shooting was hot and dangerous. Shimada described it as akin "an out of control festival". At one point during the shoot, a pillar of fire erupted from the ground. Shimada was caught in the blast and burned both wrists, requiring an urgent trip to the hospital. Since the production was Japan's first full-scale high definition film, simple shots regularly took half a day, exacerbating the stress of the cast and crew. Director Irvin Kershner came on set to watch the filming. According to reports, he left disappointed.

Some commentators and spectators attributed these accidents to the influence of Taira no Masakado's real life spirit. It is now common practice for Japanese filmmakers and TV crews to pay respect to the burial site of Masakado before bringing him to the screen.

The movie received a great deal of publicity with the media highlighting the grand recreation of circa 1927 Ginza district being made just for use in the film. The open set, which cost around 300 million yen by itself, was a 150 meter long life sized facsimile of the early Showa era district featuring several electric cable cars and 3000 fully costumed extras.

== Reception ==
When Tokyo: The Last Megalopolis was released in Japanese theaters, it quickly became a commercial success and received critical acclaim. Peer Magazine, a prominent cinema publication in Japan, even hailed it as the "best Japanese science fiction production of all time." The film earned an impressive annual revenue of 1.79 billion yen, making it the third highest grossing Japanese-produced film of that year, and the eighth highest-grossing film in Japan overall.

Swiss artist H.R. Giger expressed disappointment with the portrayal of the creatures he designed for the film, however he conceded that it was probably the best Japan's motion picture technology was capable of doing at the time.

However, the subtitled version of the film received mixed reception in the West. Anthony Romero of Toho Kingdom praised the high production values of the film but criticized it for attempting to cover too much ground in too short a time. GenjiPress, a Japanese enthusiast website, deemed the film "absolutely ridiculous from beginning to end" and criticized its confusing plot.

On the other hand, Ian Shutter of videovista.net gave the film a high rating of 8/10, describing it as a "surreal yet always fascinating gothic urban nightmare" with a blend of urban history and fantasy horror centered on the great disaster of 1923. Lee Broughton of DVD Savant rated it as "Excellent" and commended its highly original mystical epic storyline and great characters. The film's ambition was even compared to Terry Gilliam's Brazil. DeVilDead.com, a French website, found the film's narrative too compressed and dense, but praised its visually elegant production, rich history, and superb scenery and acting. Sarudama, another website, called it an incredibly ambitious and well-cast movie.

In his book Tokyoscope, author Patrick Macias gave the movie a positive review, describing it as "overcooked" but "far from a bust." Jim Harper, in his book Flowers from Hell: The Modern Japanese Horror Film, conceded that the film could have been a "bona fide cult classic" if not for some pacing problems and a ponderous plot.

In a 2015 Blu-ray commentary, the filmmakers compared Tokyo: The Last Megalopolis to David Lynch's 1984 film adaptation of Frank Herbert's Dune, both being ambitious, visually lush, large budget adaptations of dense science fiction works that compressed the source material's narrative to fit a 2-hour time slot.

== Accolades ==
Wins

- 18th Takasaki Film Festival: Award for Best Newcomer; Kyūsaku Shimada, 1988

Nominations

- Japanese Academy Awards: Award of the Japanese Academy, Best Editing, Keiichi Uraoka; Best Art Direction, Takeo Kimura, Noriyoshi Ikeya; 1989

== Legacy ==
The movie was notable for being the first to visually portray Chinese and Japanese folklore tropes such as shikigami, kodoku magic, gohō dōji, and Kimon Tonkou magic in Japanese cinema. The movie's box office success paved the way for a film franchise consisting of a direct sequel, an OVA remake, two direct-to-video spinoff titles, Teito Monogatari Gaiden (1995), Sim-Feng Shui (1997), and a theatrical spinoff, The Great Yokai War (2005).

The movie was the first major successful project for Takashige Ichise, the producer who would go on to be responsible for the contemporary J-Horror boom by financing such franchises as the Ring and Ju-On series. It was also the most financially successful production for director Akio Jissoji, best known in the West for his work on the classic tokusatsu series Ultraman.

Kyūsaku Shimada's performance as Yasunori Kato, the primary antagonist of the film, was extremely popular with audiences and is considered the most popular representation of the character. He reprised the role in Doomed Megalopolis, 4 OVAs that also adapt from the first 4 novels. Hiroshi Aramata even rewrote physical descriptions of Kato in the novel's republications to more closely match Shimada's image. Shimada's portrayal of Yasunori Kato has been frequently homaged in Japanese popular culture, such as in the fictional characters Washizaki from the manga/anime Riki-Oh and M. Bison/Vega of the Street Fighter video game series. The character also has a cameo appearance in the opening chapters of CLAMP's Tokyo Babylon manga, and has been parodied in TV animation and video games.

Independent film director Go Shibata has cited Tokyo: The Last Megalopolis as an influence on his work, including his 2009 film Doman Seman.

== Home Releases ==
In Japan, the film is available on VHS, DVD and Blu-ray. In 1995, Manga Live released a VHS edition of the film in the UK which was edited, as well as dubbed. In 1998, ADV Films released a subtitled VHS copy of the film in the North American market. In 2003, ADV Films released a subtitled DVD edition of the film to the North American market.

The film and its sequel were both released in Japan on Blu-ray on August 8, 2015 in a Special Edition package featuring new cover designs by SPFX artist Shinji Higuchi (who worked on the film).

In 2023, Media Blasters Licensed the Film and Released the film on Blu-Ray under the Title "Doomed Megalopolis: The Last Megalopolis". It features the movie in Japanese with English Subtitles and the English Dub from the Manga UK VHS reconstructed in HD.

== See also ==
Onmyoji (2001): An equally popular historical fantasy film dealing with some of the same subject matter. The novels the respective films were based on were released only a few years apart and thus are considered part of the same "boom".

== Sources ==
- Harper, Jim (2008), Flowers from Hell: The Modern Japanese Horror Film (illustrated ed.), Noir Publishing, ISBN 978-0-9536564-7-9
- Weisser, Thomas; Weisser, Yuko Mihara (1998), Japanese Cinema Encyclopedia (2nd ed.), Vital Books, ISBN 1-889288-51-9
