= Yasunori Katō =

Japanese fictional character

- Katō as portrayed by Kyūsaku Shimada in the 1988 adaptation of Teito Monogatari.
- First appearance: Teito Monogatari vol. 1 (1985) (Kadokawa Shoten)
- Last appearance: The Great Yokai War: Guardians (2021) (Kadokawa Shoten)
- Created by: Hiroshi Aramata
- Portrayed by: Kyūsaku Shimada (Tokyo: The Last Megalopolis, Tokyo: The Last War, Doomed Megalopolis); Kazuhiko Nishimura (Teito Monogatari Gaiden); Etsushi Toyokawa (The Great Yokai War); Jeff Winkless (Streamline dub) and Peter Marinker (Manga dub) (Doomed Megalopolis); Ryunosuke Kamiki (The Great Yokai War: Guardians)

Yasunori Katō (加藤 保憲, Katō Yasunori) is a fictional character, the protagonist of the Japanese historical fantasy series Teito Monogatari, created by Hiroshi Aramata. He first appeared in a 1983 issue of a science fiction magazine published by Kadokawa Shoten but gained more widespread attention with successive publications as well as his cinematic debut, and has since gone on to be referenced frequently in Japanese popular culture. His character is generally associated with onmyōdō mysticism since Teito Monogatari was one of the first novels to popularize the art in modern Japanese fiction.

In Japanese, he is commonly referenced with the prefix "Majin" (魔人, Majin; 'Demon Man') due to his incredible superhuman abilities and near immortality.

== Biography ==
Katō is a supernatural Melmoth the Wanderer-style figure with a mysterious past. He is described as an oni born from the grudge of 2000 years of Japan's hidden history. As his opponent Yasumasa Hirai, the official descendant of the mythical Abe no Seimei and leader of the true onmyōji who serve the Japanese Emperor explains:

From the viewpoint of onmyōdō of the Tsuchimikado line, an oni is a transparent genie that onmyōji manipulate. The term oni means the indigenous people of the water or mountain. It could be a descendant of Chinese, Korean or naturalized Japanese who did not worship the imperial court...He [Katō] is a descendant of those who rebelled against the imperial court in ancient times. Katō is a villain who inherited the grudge and the heresy from them and will endanger the unbroken Japanese imperial line. He is probably not a Japanese subject.

However Katō is also a powerful sorcerer; a skilled onmyōji who manipulates oni. Later on in the novel, his birthplace is determined to be Ryūjin, Wakayama and associations are made between his lineage and Abe no Seimei's clan. The implication is that Kato's ancestors were heretics who practiced onmyōdō magic outside the established government.

In the 19th century, he enlists in the Imperial Japanese Army under the guise of a Japanese soldier and rises to the rank of First Lieutenant.

In Teito Monogatari, Katō reveals his true intentions to destroy Tokyo through any means possible in order to cripple the Japanese Empire. He joins forces with underground Chinese and Korean anti-Japanese oppression groups (such as Donghak Peasant Revolution) and continues to work behind the scenes of various periods of 20th-century history to cause supernatural disasters which will weaken Japan. His first goal is to awaken the sleeping spirit of Taira no Masakado to help him cripple the country. However, his plans branch off into feng shui territories, agonizing the firmament and earth dragons to cause earthquakes and other natural disasters. In 1927, his efforts are temporarily sabotaged by the powerful miko and priestess of Masakado, Keiko Tatsumiya.

In 1945, he is instrumental in the death of Franklin D. Roosevelt. The Japanese government organizes a plan to assassinate the Allied leaders through a Buddhist curse cast by abbot Otani Kozui, with their first target being Roosevelt. The Japanese Freemasons politically oppose the plan and attempt to sabotage the project. However, Kato assassinates the leader of the Japanese Freemasons, allowing the curse to go to completion.

In 1960, Kato returns to Japan amidst the chaos of student protests against the signing of the Treaty of Mutual Cooperation and Security between the United States and Japan. There he recruits the eager young writer Yukio Mishima and manipulates him. Eventually, a series of events escalate, culminating in the author's ritual suicide on November 25, 1970.

In 1998, Katō returns to stir up another earthquake under Tokyo by arousing the water dragon. At this point in the story, Katō is defined as another version of Taira no Masakado himself. Just as Masakado sought to overthrow the current Japanese government in his time, so does Katō seek to overthrow the contemporary Imperial authority by eliminating the capital Tokyo.

Amidst the wreckage of the Imperial Capital, Kato and his allies contend with the remaining defenders of Tokyo, which include a resurrected Yukio Mishima and Keiko Tatsumiya's apprentice. After a long struggle, Kato is finally defeated.

Katō's past is more deeply explored in the spin-off novel Teito Monogatari Iroku. In this novel, it is also revealed that he is the last descendant in a long line of mystics. His predecessor was Jubei Katō, a character whose story is chronicled in the novels Teito Gendan and Shin Teito Monogatari.

In The Great Yokai War, Katō returns to Japan in 2005 with an army of monsters created from discarded objects infused with yōkai under his command in another attempt to destroy Tokyo. This time he is stopped by the efforts of a band of native yōkai and a young boy wielding the power of the Kirin Rider. Despite being defeated, gaining Azuki bean-like pupils in the process, Katō survives the encounter and it is implied that at the end that he is ready to execute another plan.

== Works appeared in ==
=== Literature ===
- Teito Monogatari (1985–1989)
- Teito Monogatari Gaiden (1995)
- Teito Gendan (1997)
- Shin Teito Monogatari (2001)
- Teito Monogatari Iroku (2001)
- The Great Yokai War (2005)
- USO MAKOTO Yōkai Hyaku Monogatari (2018)

=== Stage ===
- Teito Monogatari (1985) by the Tokyo Grand Guignol Theater Company

=== Film ===
- Tokyo: The Last Megalopolis (1988)
- Tokyo: The Last War (1989)
- Teito Monogatari Gaiden (1995)
- The Great Yokai War (2005)
- The Great Yokai War: Guardians (2021)

=== TV ===
- Kamen Norida (Episode: "Horror! Teito Taisen Man!", 1989)

=== Manga ===
- BABYLON TOKYO (1987)
- Teito Monogatari (1987)
- Teito Monogatari: TOKIO WARS (1989)

=== Anime ===
- Doomed Megalopolis (1991–1992)

== Appearance ==
Artist Suehiro Maruo's illustration of the character from the cover of the first publication of Teito Monogatari.

The original character was simply described as a youthful military officer with no specific age. The character evolved in popular culture though and his image began to change. In modern depictions, he is generally described as a tall man with an unnaturally long face. His classic outfit is composed of the traditional uniform of a Japanese Imperial officer, complete with a service dress, cap, gloves, sword and a cape. On the backs of his white gloves are red inscriptions of the "Seiman" (the pentagram), the magic symbol of Abe no Seimei.

== Powers and abilities ==
Kato is incredibly proficient in a variety of eastern magic, most notably the art of Onmyōdō, possessing abilities that rival the Tsuchimikado Clan, descendants of Abe no Seimei. He extensively employs black shikigami to do his bidding, and he can also summon goho doji. He is also known to use kodoku (worm toxins) to control and manipulate his victims.

To prolong his life, he performs the shijie technique from time to time. As a trained imperial officer, he is quite proficient in the use of a katana. He is also fluent in Mandarin and Korean.

== Analysis ==
Hiroshi Aramata has described his original vision of the character as closely resembling the English occultist Aleister Crowley. In other interviews, Aramata has stated that he wanted the character to symbolize both the heretical and official sects of onmyōji. Dr. Noriko T. Reider, assistant professor of Japanese Studies at Miami University, argues that Kato is an exemplary example of evolving, postwar sentiments about oni in Japanese culture.

Some scholars and enthusiasts have also likened the character to a Japanese version of Dracula, with the plot of Teito Monogatari being a loose recreation of the famous horror story.

== Adaptations ==
In the Tokyo Grand Guignol stage adaptation of Teito Monogatari, Katō was played by Kyūsaku Shimada. Shimada went on to portray Katō in the films Tokyo: The Last Megalopolis (1988) directed by Akio Jissoji, and Tokyo: The Last War (1989) directed by Takashige Ichise. He also provided his voice to the Japanese version of the anime Doomed Megalopolis (1991–1992) directed by Rintaro.

In the 1995 spinoff film Teito Monogatari Gaiden (1995) directed by Izo Hashimoto, the nurse who gets possessed by Katō's spirit is portrayed by Kazuhiko Nishimura.

Etsushi Toyokawa portrayed Katō in The Great Yokai War (2005), directed by Takashi Miike. For this film, Katō is dressed in a modern black outfit instead of his usual military attire.

He also appears as a surprise supporting character in the film's sequel The Great Yokai War: Guardians. Here he is played by Ryunosuke Kamiki.

In the cinematic adaptations, Katō is portrayed quite differently from his literary counterpart, generally as a more monstrous and vicious character. He is middle-aged instead of a young man. Whereas the literary character was quite verbose and could carry on long conversations with the other characters, the cinematic version's discourses are more limited, consisting mainly of threats or boasts. Whereas the original character supported his allies and defended them from harm, the cinematic version is more indifferent to suffering and works by himself more often.

Probably inspired by the invincible monsters of classic horror films, the cinematic versions of the character are incredibly durable and almost immune to pain. Across the films, he survives being dismembered, run through with a sword, having a hole blown through his body by magic, scorched by lightning, being impaled in the head, shot with a revolver several times in succession, and even having his entire face blown apart. In all these cases, he seems relatively unfazed and recovers extremely quickly. He is also rarely shown wielding a katana, except briefly in both Teito Monogatari Gaiden and The Great Yokai War.

== In popular culture ==
After his literary and film debut, Yasunori Kato went on to become a frequently referenced figure in Japanese popular culture, inspiring a slew of imitators and homages.

- General Washizaki from the manga/anime Riki-Oh is believed to have taken a visual cue from Kyūsaku Shimada's portrayal of Yasunori Katō. General Washizaki appeared in the series only a couple months after the live-action adaptation of Teito Monogatari was released in theaters.
- Kato himself makes a humorous cameo appearance at the beginning of the manga Tokyo Babylon. Beyond that, Subaru Sumeragi and Seishirō Sakurazuka, the protagonists of Tokyo Babylon and X are onmyōji with designs that contain subtle nods to Kato.
- The cinematic version of Katō is widely considered one of the primary inspirations for M. Bison, the final boss in the video game Street Fighter II: The World Warrior and its iterations, both antagonists are evil militants with supernatural powers, and world domination schemes, as well many early illustrations of M. Bison are directly based on and reference Yasunori Kato as depicted in the posters of the film and OVA.
- The mecha anime The Brave Police J-Decker contains a parody of Kato named Noriyasu Kato, he sports the same military outfit and an exaggerated comedic depiction of Kato's long face, he's also able to summon demons with onmyōdō.
- The protagonist of the video game Shin Megami Tensei: Devil Summoner, Raidou Kuzunoha, is an homage to Katō wearing an early 20th-century style military outfit and possessing similar powers. His surname Kuzunoha is derived from the folklore mother of Abe no Seimei, whom Katō claims to be a descendant of.
- The villain of Go Shibata's 2009 film Doman Seman is called "Katō the Catwalk Doman Seman". This is a reference to Yasunori Katō (the "Seiman" is Katō's trademark symbol).
- The fourth volume of the light novel adaptation of the series Nura: Rise of the Yokai Clan, which deals heavily with onmyōdō, is called Teito Koi Monogatari (ISBN 978-4087032512). The cover depicts one of the characters wearing a military uniform.
- Episode 7 of the anime Haunted Junction features a villain who is a parody of Yasunori Kato wearing a military outfit and described as the last descendant of Abe no Seimei.
- Kato is mentioned in the video game VA-11 Hall-A. He is described as an evil onmyōji.
- Kim Newman's 2017 novel Anno Dracula: 1000 Monsters features a major character named "Lieutenant Majin", a "horseshoe faced" military officer who commands yōkai. Though the character has multiple names, he is an obvious homage to Yasunori Kato.

== See also ==
- Kamo no Yasunori – Yasunori Katō is named after this onmyōji

== Sources ==
- Clements, Jonathan; McCarthy, Helen (2006), The Anime Encyclopedia: A Guide to Japanese Animation Since 1917 (2nd rev. ed.), Stone Bridge Press, ISBN 1-933330-10-4
- Reider, Noriko (2010), Japanese Demon Lore: Oni from Ancient Times to the Present (1st ed.), Utah State University Press, ISBN 978-0-87421-793-3
