= Doomed Megalopolis =

Original video animation based on a novel by Hiroshi Aramata

- The cover of ADV's DVD release of Doomed Megalopolis.

帝都物語 (Teitō Monogatari)
- Original video animation
- Directed by: Rintaro (chief); Kazuyoshi Katayama (1); Koichi Chigira (2); Kazunari Kume (3); Masashi Ikeda (4)
- Produced by: Masao Maruyama; Naoko Takahashi
- Written by: Akinori Endō; Masayuki (4); Rintaro (4)
- Music by: Kazuhiko Toyama
- Studio: Madhouse
- Licensed by: NA: Media Blasters
- Released: September 27, 1991 – August 14, 1992
- Runtime: 40 minutes (each)
- Episodes: 4

Doomed Megalopolis (帝都物語, Teito Monogatari) is a 1991 Japanese original video animation (OVA) series produced by Madhouse and distributed by Toei. It is an adaptation of the historical fantasy novel Teito Monogatari by Hiroshi Aramata. Like its live-action predecessor, Tokyo: The Last Megalopolis, the anime is only an adaptation of the first third (the first four books) of the original novel. The plot concerns a spiritual battle within Tokyo during the early 20th century.

== Plot ==
=== Episode 1: "The Haunting of Tokyo" ===
The story begins in contemporary Tokyo, with a voiceover narrative concerning the expanding city's state. The narrator tells the tale of how Taira no Masakado went against the Emperor and was executed for his crimes. However, his hatred for the new capital of Edo has left a dangerous onryo that persists in the city to this day. Throughout the years, Masakado's spirit was placated through the worship of the citizens of Tokyo, and he became deified as the city's guardian spirit. If his powerful spirit were to be awoken or disturbed, though, his suppressed anger against the Japanese Empire would be unleashed and would cause havoc on a national level.

The setting moves backward to 1908. Two figures appear in Tokyo at exactly the same time. One is Yasumasa Hirai, a master onmyoji, a direct descendant of Abe no Seimei and leader of the Tsuchimikado Family; who has come to give advice to Baron Eiichi Shibusawa on how to make Tokyo the most blessed and successful city in the East. The other figure is Yasunori Kato, an evil Onmyoji who wishes to destroy Tokyo completely to appease his ancestors, the indigenous tribes of Japan who fought against the Imperial court in ancient times. Kato plans to do this by awakening the raging spirit of Taira no Masakado as a weapon to demolish the city. To do this, he kidnaps a young woman (Yukari Tatsumiya), who is blessed with psychic powers, to use as a medium for Masakado's spirit. Hirai discovers this and attempts to stop Kato and save Yukari with his own magic. Hirai takes Yukari to the Tsuchimikado temple to perform the monoimi ceremony. In the meantime, Yukari's friends fight Kato's shikigami outside the temple so Hirai can complete the ceremony. But Kato still infiltrates Hirai's protective circle with a magical intruder, stopping the ceremony. In a final act of desperation Hirai grabs a sacred hamaya and fires it at Kato; but Kato magically reflects it back, mortally injuring Hirai. With Hirai defeated, Kato escapes with Yukari.

=== Episode 2: "The Fall of Tokyo" ===
Kato's attempts to awaken Masakado through Yukari have been unsuccessful so far, indicating that there may be other factors preventing Masakado from coming back to life. In response, Kato uses the magic of En on Yukari to impregnate her with the determination to conceive a child with even more spiritual power. Believing his magic has succeeded, Kato leaves Tokyo, planning to return when the child is of suitable age to use as a medium. Hirai's followers find Yukari and deliver her back to her brother's home. Tragedy strikes the nation as the Emperor Meiji passes away thus ending the Meiji period. In a display of devotion to the Meiji Emperor Hirai commits seppuku, an act which also serves to divine the year of Tokyo's destruction—the year of the Pig.

The story then moves ten years forward to 1923 where Yukari's daughter, Yukiko Tatsumiya, is now a young girl. In Dalian, China Kato creates artificial earthquake waves which will be amplified out to Tokyo. Then he returns to Japan to kidnap Yukiko. Upon crossing Nihonbashi Bridge, Kato runs into several defence measures set by Tsuchimikado Clan, including a Kimon Tonkou spell set by Hirai's follower and Koda Rohan. Despite all this resistance, he still successfully makes his way to Masakado's grave and tries to invoke its spirit through the body of Yukiko. Furious, Masakado's spirit reacts by summoning a lightning bolt down upon Kato. However, Kato's previous attempts to create an artificial earthquake were successful enough to disturb the Underground Dragon, whose violent undulations result in the Great Kantō earthquake of 1923.

=== Episode 3: "The Gods of Tokyo" ===
The plot shifts to 1927, a year in the Showa Period. While rebuilding Tokyo, plans are put forth by Noritsugu Hayakawa to erect a subway system which will modernize the city. Hayakawa employs the talents of Torahiko Terada, a physicist and scientist in the field of earthquake studies, to oversee construction. Kato infiltrates the construction sites for the subway tunnel, and utilizes shikigami to hold the workers at bay while he focuses on a second awakening of the Underground Dragon, trying to create an earthquake larger than the Great Kanto one. Shibusawa calls in a Feng Shui expert (Shigemaru Kuroda), who pinpoints the source of these disturbances to foreign magic that is undermining the balance of the earth's spiritual energy veins. Since the construction workers are too frightened to continue their work, Terada decides that different action must be taken to complete the excavation. He enlists the help of Dr. Makoto Nishimura to use his robot Gakutensoku to finish the work. Terada reasons that since Gakutensoku is inhuman, he can't be tricked by psychic apparitions that would terrify normal men.

Meanwhile, a young shrine maiden by the name of Keiko Mekata appears near the Ministry of Finance. She is a powerful and skilled miko who has been summoned by Masakado's spirit to oppose Kato. While praying at Masakado's shrine one day, she catches the eye of Yoichiro Tatsumiya, who courts her. The two eventually marry, and Keiko is initiated into the Tatsumiya household. As a member of the Tatsumiya household, Keiko provides spiritual protection for the family from the inside. Kato, prevented from rousing the Underground Dragon by Masakado, decides to kidnap Yukiko and use her as a sacrifice to amplify the Dragon's energy. After a battle at the Tatsumiya household, Kato escapes with Yukiko and Keiko pursues him underground. While contending with Keiko, Kato is distracted and doesn't notice the efforts of Gakutensoku, who drilling deep underground, has arrived at the "heart" of the Underground Dragon and self-destructs. This throws the chi veins into disarray, releasing Yukiko and foiling Kato's plan. Finally, Keiko uses Masakado's power to banish Kato.

=== Episode 4: "The Battle for Tokyo" ===
Wounded by Keiko, Kato has retreated to a small, desecrated temple in the outskirts of Tokyo. The dark onmyoji employs all his powers to shift the path of the moon so that it will rebound violently off the earth and disturb the Firmament Dragon, who will destroy Tokyo. Keiko receives spiritual aid from Kuroda and Masakado's spirit and sets off to stop Kato once and for all. Instead of fighting him however, she channels the power of the bodhisattva Kannon, against whom Kato, an oni, is powerless. Bathed in the limitless compassion of the bodhisattva, the curse that had been fuelling Kato for so long is appeased and he dissipates. The story ends in 1927 with Japan's first underground railroad system being opened and a quote by Koda Rohan, who hopes Tokyo will find peace for the time being.

== Cast ==
Cast
Role	Japanese	English	
Role	Japanese	Manga Entertainment/ World Wide Group (1993)	Streamline Pictures (1995)
Narrator	Masaaki Okabe	Cyril Shaps	Milton James
Jun'ichi Narutaki	Kouichi Yamadera	Mark Straker	Cam Clarke
Yasunori Katou	Kyuusaku Shimada	Peter Marinker	Jeff Winkless
Yasumasa Hirai	Gorou Naya	Edward Kelsey	Mike Reynolds
Dr. Makoto Nishimura	Kan Tokumaru	Denys Hawthorne	Clifton Wells
Youichirou Tatsumiya	Kaneto Shiozawa	Jay Benedict	Kerrigan Mahan
Yukari Tatsumiya	Keiko Han	Alison Dowling	Joan-Carol O'Connell
Kamo	Ken Yamaguchi	Peter Reissner	Ardwight Chamberlain
Shigemaru Kuroda	Kenichi Ogata	Nigel Lambert	Steve Kramer
Junkichi Amano	Kouichi Kitamura	David Collings	Edward Mannix
Torahiko Terada	Naoki Tatsuta	Ian Thompson	Steve Bulen
Viscount Eiichi Shibusawa	Osamu Saka	John Baddeley	Michael Forest
Noritsugu Hayakawa	Takaya Hashi	Michael McClain	Michael McConnohie
Keiko Tatsumiya	Youko Asagami	Maria Warburg	Barbara Goodson
Shigeyuki "Rohan Kouda" Kouda	Yuusaku Yara	John Bull	Sam Fontana

Much of Manga Entertainment's cast is uncredited, while Streamline Pictures doesn't match actors to any roles. Both English cast lists have been made by comparing other roles in their talent pool with roles in the OVA series.

== Production ==
Supervising director Rintaro had previously read Teito Monogatari upon its initial publication and was greatly attracted to it. In directing the animated adaptation, he felt that his biggest challenge would be distinguishing it from the recent popular live action adaptations Tokyo: The Last Megalopolis and Tokyo: The Last War. He eventually decided that he would use the freedom given to him by animation to exploit the supernatural elements of the story, presenting them in a far more illustrious fashion than was possible with the live-action films. Although he tried to create his own unique vision, he admitted that the anime is still undeniably influenced by the live-action adaptations.

The OVA adapts the first 4 chapters of a 12 chapter story.

One scene in the film with the monoimi ceremony recreates the events of one of Abe no Seimei's famous tales from the Uji Shūi Monogatari.

The anime is darker in tone, more violent, and more sexually explicit than any previous adaptations of the novel; an artistic decision likely inspired by the financial success of the OVA Urotsukidōji: Legend of the Overfiend.

Actor Kyusaku Shimada was recruited to provide the voice of Yasunori Kato based on the popularity of his performance in the previous adaptations. This was his first-time doing voice-over work for an animated production.

== Distribution ==
Manga Entertainment first licensed the property for English release subbed and dubbed in 1993. In 1995, Streamline Pictures gained the rights to the anime and released it on a four-volume VHS series in the US, with their own separate English dub. In 2001, ADV Films re-released the entire series on a 2-Disc DVD edition. However, this release did not have the original Japanese soundtrack or any special features. Eventually, ADV gathered the rights to the original Japanese version, and in 2003 re-released an enhanced version titled Doomed Megalopolis: Special Edition, wherein the Japanese language option was available and bonus features (such as interviews and documentaries) were added.

The series was initially released over four VHS tapes. In 2003, the series was released on DVD in English through ADV Film. As of 2010, the production is currently owned by Bandai and is available for streaming on their website. In March 2026, the series will be released on Blu-ray based on a 5K scan, and released in 2K format. The limited-edition version additionally comes with a 40-page book explaining the background, story, and setting of the series.

== Reception ==
Angeline Kim writing in Animerica said: "This is a horror film, after all, and if you've got the stomach for a good, creepy, animated chill, Doomed Megalopolis is definitely a memorable nightmare."

In 2003, IGN writer Andy Patrizio reviewed the series saying: "As a horror story, it delivers. There are some very cool sequences and some brutal fights, but then they are interspersed with long periods of boredom."
