= Teito Monogatari Gaiden =

- Poster
- Directed by: Izo Hashimoto
- Written by: Rika Yamagami
- Based on: the novel by Hiroshi Aramata
- Produced by: Kazuo Suzaki
- Starring: Kazuhiko Nishimura; Sawa Suzuki; Kazuko Shirakawa; Hatsuo Yamaya; Hiroshi Kanbe; Bengal; Ichiro Ogura; Ayumi Nagashi; Ryoka Yuzuki
- Cinematography: Osamu Fujishi
- Music by: Masaya Abe
- Production company: KSS
- Release date: September 15, 1995 (Japan)
- Country: Japan
- Language: Japanese

Teito Monogatari Gaiden (Japanese: 帝都物語外伝) is a Japanese horror/dark fantasy film. It is a spin-off of the Teito Monogatari franchise. It is not based on the original novel, but rather adapted from a side story novel, Karakuri Doshi (which occurs in contemporary times). Like the animated adaptation which preceded it, the film is much darker, more violent and sexualized than its predecessors, and deviates greatly from its source material. It was released through V-Cinema in 1995.

The film was advertised as being a direct sequel to Tokyo: The Last War going so far as to include a silhouette of actor Kyusaku Shimada in many of the promotional materials. However the movie was produced by a completely different studio and worked on by a different creative staff from the Toho distributed adaptations.

== Synopsis ==
In 1995, a mental hospital is erected near the Japanese Ministry of Finance, located adjacent to the grave of Taira no Masakado. A young male nurse by the name of Jin’ya Yanase is obsessed with the legend of Taira no Masakado and more importantly, the spirit of his evil subordinate Yasunori Kato. Slowly, he becomes possessed by Kato's spirit, who wants to use him as a new host to revive in the modern world. Keiko Tatsumiya (the heroine of the original story), is an old woman living homeless on the streets of Tokyo. When she senses the presence of Yasunori Kato, she must regain her resolve to face the demon-god and vanquish his spirit once and for all.
