= Teito Monogatari =

1983–1987 novels by Hiroshi Aramata

- Covers of the 1987 republication. Art by Yoshitaka Amano.
- Author: Hiroshi Aramata
- Language: Japanese
- Genre: Alternate History; Science fantasy Dark fantasy Weird fiction
- Publisher: Kadokawa Shoten
- Published: 1985–1989; 1995 in print
- Media type: Print (hardcover and paperback)

Teito Monogatari (帝都物語, lit., The Tale of the Imperial Capital) is the debut novel of Japanese author Hiroshi Aramata. It began circulation in the literary magazine Monthly King Novel owned by Kadokawa Shoten in 1983, and was published in 10 volumes over the course of 1985–1987.

The novel is a romanticized retelling of the 20th-century history of Tokyo from an occultist perspective, and can be regarded as an epic work of historical fiction, dark fantasy and science fiction.

The work is widely recognized as the first mainstream novel to popularize onmyōdō and feng shui mythology in modern Japanese fiction. It was a bestseller with over 5 million copies sold in Japan alone. It won the 1987 Nihon SF Taisho Award, inspired several adaptations as well as a long running literary franchise. Likewise its influence can still be felt in many later works.

== Overview ==
The work is a re-imagining of the 20th century of Tokyo as influenced by the occult. Most of the subject matter builds upon references to classic Japanese and Chinese folklore, although the centerpiece of the mythology is the legend of Taira no Masakado, a 10th-century warlord and ferocious onryo who was placated into a guardian kami through centuries of worship.

The plot features many characters, both historical and fictional. Most of the narrative revolves around the cryptohistorical actions of Yasunori Katō, a mysterious former lieutenant of the Imperial Japanese Army who is himself a vengeful oni; a descendant of the people who rebelled against the Japanese Empire in ancient times. With an incredible knowledge of the supernatural and allies in China, Korea and Taiwan; Katō dedicates his life to crippling Tokyo, the seat of power of the modern Japanese Empire. His ruinous ambitions bring him into conflict with some of 20th century Japan's greatest minds including industrialist Eiichi Shibusawa, onmyoji Abe no Seimei's descendant Yasumasa Hirai, authors Koda Rohan and Izumi Kyoka; physicist Torahiko Terada, and author Yukio Mishima. The resulting conflict, involving science, magic and politics; spans 90 years of Japan's history.

The story begins near the end of the Meiji period and ranges through the rest of the century. It reinvents major events such as the Great Kantō earthquake, the founding of Japan's first subway, the February 26 Incident, the firebombing raids, the signing of the 1960 US Security Pact, and the ritual suicide of Yukio Mishima. The narrative finally reaches its climax in 1998, the 73rd year of a fictional Shōwa period.

== List of characters ==
The historical characters who play primary or supporting roles in the story include:

- Taira no Masakado
- Tachibana no Hayanari
- Aterui
- Tōyama Kagemoto
- Hirata Atsutane
- Hijikata Toshizō
- Ichimura Tetsunosuke
- Enomoto Takeaki
- Edward and Henry Schnell
- Prince Sawara
- Sugawara no Michizane
- Thomas Blakiston
- Kōda Rohan
- Satō Nobuhiro
- Joseph Needham
- Mori Ōgai
- Torahiko Terada
- Hantaro Nagaoka
- Karl Haushofer
- Shoma Morita
- Makoto Nishimura
- Gakutensoku
- Shibusawa Eiichi
- Kyōka Izumi
- Akiko Yosano
- Masatoshi Ōkōchi
- Noritsugu Hayakawa
- Wajiro Kon
- Goto Shinpei
- Korekiyo Takahashi
- Kanji Nakajima
- Ikki Kita
- Puyi
- Kanji Ishiwara
- Hideki Tojo
- Ōtani Kōzui
- Franklin D. Roosevelt
- Shūmei Ōkawa
- Masahiko Amakasu
- Hisaya Morishige
- Yukio Mishima
- George Gurdjieff
- Fusako Shigenobu
- Kadokawa Gen'yoshi
- Haruki Kadokawa

== Volumes ==
The tenth volume of the novel, published in 1987, was originally intended to be the final volume. However, when the novel was republished in 1987–1989, additional eleventh and twelfth volumes were also written to supplement more of the story around 1945, the end of World War II. When the novel was republished in 1995, volumes 11 and 12 were inserted in the chronologically appropriate spot between volumes 5 and 6.

- Vol. 1: Great Spirit of Tokyo (神霊篇)
- Vol. 2: Supernatural Babylon (魔都（バビロン）篇)
- Vol. 3: The Great Earthquake (大震災（カタストロフ）篇)
- Vol. 4: Movement of the Dragon (龍動篇)
- Vol. 5: Advent of the Devil (魔王篇)
- Vol. 6: Great War in the Capital (戦争（ウォーズ）篇)
- Vol. 7: Greater East Asia (大東亜篇)
- Vol. 8: The Phoenix (不死鳥篇)
- Vol. 9: Rampant Evil (The Demon's Journey of 100 Nights) (百鬼夜行篇)
- Vol. 10: Shrine of the Future (未来宮篇)
- Vol. 11: Power of the Mourning Spirit (喪神篇)
- Vol. 12: Resurrection (復活篇)

== List of publications ==
- Gekkan Shosetsu-o serialized version. 1983-1985. Cover art by Takahiko Akiyama
- 10 volumes, 1985–1987, cover art by Suehiro Maruo
- 12 volumes, 1987–1989, cover art by Yoshitaka Amano
- 6 volumes, 1995, cover art by Shou Tajima (this is the edition currently in print)

== Concept and creation ==
The novel originally served as a minor side project for Hiroshi Aramata who, at the time, was focused on gathering materials for an upcoming natural history book he planned to publish. He was asked by the editor in chief of Kadokawa Shoten, Hiroshi Morinaga, to produce a fantasy themed work for their periodical Monthly King Novel. At that time, Aramata had never written a fictional novel before, however Morinaga felt that Aramata's huge body of knowledge and diversity of interests made him an ideal candidate for novel writing.

The initial idea for the story came from Aramata's research into the legend of Taira no Masakado. Aramata was fascinated by the legacy of his deification and its continuing impact on the spiritual lives of modern Japanese citizens. In a 2011 interview with Fuji TV, Aramata described how Masakado's shrine occupies some of the richest land in Tokyo and that many companies located around his head mound pay it the greatest respect. He had felt the subject of Masakado's legacy was a wonderful opportunity to explore how spirituality crosses over with the values of the modern secular world. Simultaneously, Aramata had also been researching the history of geomancy in Japan. He felt that he could combine the two subjects--the legacy of Masakado's spirit and the geomantic roots of Tokyo--into an original and compelling story. In addition, while participating in the creation of Heibonsha World Encyclopedia, Hiroshi Aramata was also inspired by discussions with anthropologist Komatsu Kazuhiko about sources of the strange and the mysterious in Japanese folklore.

Scholarly interest in onmyodo had been gestating in Japan since the 1950's, however in the early 1980's the subject was still esoteric and had not gained mainstream attention. In 1981, scholar Murayama Shinichi published a landmark history of the subject entitled Nihon Onmyodoshi Sosetsu. Shinichi's work, along with other works dealing with oriental occultism, inspired Aramata to heavily incorporate the subject into his novel. In addition the book Meiji No Tokyo Keikaku by Terunobu Fujimori, describing the history of urban planning in Tokyo during the Meiji Era, also served as an inspiration.

== Publication ==
The work was originally serialized in 13 installments in Kadokawa Shoten's magazine Gekkan Shosetsu-o from the first issue in 1983 to the 13th issue in 1984. It was then republished in paperback format from Kadokawa Novels from 1985-1987. The work was an immediate bestseller. Aramata earned about 150 million yen in royalties from the work. However these earnings were quickly spent on the acquisition of rare books for his private library.

== Legacy ==
Teito Monogatari, the novel and its various adaptations, is widely credited with being the first fictional work to popularize topics such as onmyodo, Feng shui, shikigami, kodoku, shijie, gohō dōji and Kimon Tonkou in Japanese popular art. Subsequently, these topics would all become recurrent tropes in mainstream Japanese fantasy fiction, including a vast number of manga, anime and video games known throughout the international scene. Science fiction author Baku Yumemakura was inspired by the work to begin writing his Onmyoji novel series; a best-selling franchise which became the popular face of onmyodo enthusiasm across Japan and the international scene. Other similarly themed franchises which emerged in the wake of the novel's success include Clamp's Tokyo Babylon manga series, and Natsuhiko Kyogoku's Kyōgokudō (京極堂) series. The novel's success overlapped with and helped fuel real life subcultural interest in these topics, most notably onmyodo and feng shui.

Mikako Iwatake cites Teito Monogatari as a work that reminded a generation of general Japanese readers about Tokyo's former status as an imperial capital. Dr. Noriko T. Reider, associate professor of Japanese Studies at Miami University, credits Teito Monogatari with raising "the oni's status and popularity greatly in modern times". In 2009 Higashi Masao, a notable authority in the field of Japanese weird fiction, wrote an article entitled "The Impact of Teito Monogatari" where he discussed the novel's influence on contemporary Japanese supernatural fiction. Akira Okawada, a specialist in Japanese science fiction literature, wrote a similar article in 2010 discussing the work's influence on that respective genre.

== Analysis ==
In her essay "Oni and Japanese Identity", Dr. Noriko T. Reider argues that the work is a heterotopic inversion of classical oni mythology heavily influenced by the supernatural configuration brought about by World War II. She describes the novel as a "...heterotopic site where...contemporary representations of oni reflect past representations, where oni of the past are not simply superimposed upon the present but both act as extensions of each other in an odd continuum". The character of Yasunori Kato is intended as a homage to classic heroes from Japanese folklore such as Minamoto no Raiko (an imperial soldier related to oni) and Abe no Seimei. Whereas those heroes were ardent defenders and valuable servants of the Empire though, Kato is presented as its worst possible enemy. This inversion is also reflected in the character of Taira no Masakado, whom at the beginning is demonized by the narrator and the Japanese government as a national rebel and a threat. However, the story unfolds with him in the role of Tokyo's benevolent guardian deity worshiped by the various protectors of the city. The negative association becomes a positive one. Another example is found in the novel's fictional version of Emperor Hirohito. In pre-war Japanese culture, the Emperor was regarded as a divine figure incapable of human failing. In Teito Monogatari however, the Showa Emperor is presented as a frail figure who prolongs his life by unwittingly ingesting a nostrum made from human organs. This practice of cannibalism effectively puts him on the level of oni, a major paradox since the Emperor's divine status and the status of oni are incompatible with each other. If even the Emperor of Japan has the potential to become an oni, then when is an oni not an oni?

== Spin-offs and prequels ==
- The Sim-Feng Shui (シム・フースイ, Shimu-Fūsui) series: Published 1993–2001. A multi-volume series starring Tatsuto Kuroda, the grandson of the feng shui expert Shigemaru Kuroda from Teito Monogatari, as he struggles against various spiritual disturbances across Japan. The fourth volume of this series was made into an independent tokusatsu film titled Tokyo Dragon (東京龍, Tōkyō Doragon), released in 1997.
- Teito Monogatari Gaiden Karakuri Dōji (帝都物語外伝 機関童子): Published 1995. A spin-off of the main story, set in 1998. The film Teito Monogatari Gaiden (帝都物語外伝) (1995) is loosely based on it.
- Teito Gendan (帝都幻談): Republished 2007–2011. A prequel to the original novel, set during the Edo period. Illustrations by Shigeru Mizuki, with an introduction by Natsuhiko Kyogoku.
- Shin Teito Monogatari (新帝都物語): Published 2001, republished in 2009. A follow-up to Teito Gendan, set during the Bakumatsu.
- Teito Monogatari Iroku (帝都物語異録): Published 2001. The "secret origins" of Yasunori Katō. This collection features the writings of a multitude of Japanese authors.
- The Great Yokai War (妖怪大戦争, Yōkai Daisensō): A 2005 fantasy film by Takashi Miike. Yasunori Katō leads an army of twisted yōkai on an invasion of Tokyo. Was made in cooperation with Hiroshi Aramata (who wrote the novel), Shigeru Mizuki and Natsuhiko Kyogoku.
- The Great Yokai War: Guardians (妖怪大戦争 ガーディアンズ, Yōkai Daisensō Gādianzu): A 2021 fantasy film by Takashi Miike. Sequel to the above film.

== Adaptations ==
=== Stage ===
A humorous stage adaptation of the novel was performed by the Tokyo Grand Guignol Theater in the mid-1980s. It is most notable for introducing the talents of its star Kyūsaku Shimada, the actor who would become most associated with the image of the protagonist Yasunori Kato in future film adaptations.

=== Manga ===
- Teito Monogatari (帝都物語, aka, BABYLON TOKYO), illustrated by Kamui Fujiwara, published by Kadokawa Shoten in 1987 and republished in 1999. A visual adaptation of books 1–4. (ISBN 978-4049260038)
- Teito Monogatari: TOKIO WARS (帝都物語 ワイド版), illustrated by Yōsuke Takahashi, published by Dragon Comics in 1989 and republished by Kadokawa Shoten in 2008. A visual adaptation of "Advent of the Devil" (book 5) and "Great War in the Capital" (book 6, formerly book 11). (ISBN 978-4776794141)
- Teito Monogatari (帝都物語), illustrated by Kei Kawaguchi, published by Shogakukan in Big Comic Spirits in 1987. It is currently unavailable in book form.

=== Film ===
- Tokyo: The Last Megalopolis (1988)
- Tokyo: The Last War (1989)
- Doomed Megalopolis (1991)

In 1988, a cinematic adaptation of the same name, adapting the first four volumes of the novel, was released by Toho Studios. The film received positive critical reception and was a commercial success, becoming one of the top ten highest grossing domestic movies of that year. The movie was eventually distributed to Western markets under the title Tokyo: The Last Megalopolis

The success of this adaptation prompted the production of a sequel, Tokyo: The Last War (1989), loosely based on the 11th book, Great War in the Capital.

In 1991, the first cinematic adaptation was remade into a four-part OVA anime of the same name produced by Madhouse. The anime was adapted to the US by Streamline Pictures under the title Doomed Megalopolis in 1995. The plot of the anime parallels the original novel, however the subject matter is darker and more violent than its source material or the cinematic adaptations preceding it.

=== Video games ===
- Yami Fuku Natsu: Teito Monogatari Futatabi (闇吹く夏 帝都物語ふたたび): A survival horror title published in 1999 by Bee Factory, Inc. Although marketed under the title Teito Monogatari, it is actually an adaptation of the Sim-Feng Shui series.

== See also ==
- Onmyoji – Critically acclaimed bestselling novel series by Baku Yumemakura influenced by Teito Monogatari
- Musubi no Yama Hiroku – Another classic historical fantasy novel with a similar premise by renowned science fiction author Ryō Hanmura
- The Sea of Fertility – Yukio Mishima's character arc in Teito Monogatari is modeled on this classic tetralogy
