= Mikijirō Hira =

Japanese actor (1933–2016)

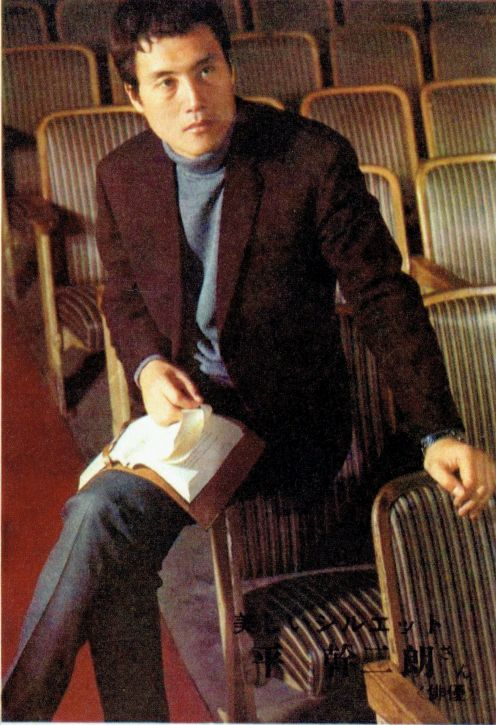
- Mikiro Hira from the February issue of Women's Life Ltd., "Women's Life" (1966)
- Born: 21 November 1933; Hiroshima, Japan
- Died: 23 October 2016 (aged 82); Setagaya, Tokyo, Japan
- Occupation: Actor
- Years active: 1956–2016
- Spouse: Yoshiko Sakuma (m. 1970; div. 1984)
- Children: Takehiro Hira
- Website: www.k-factory.net/profiles/mikijiro-hira

Mikijirō Hira (平 幹二朗, Hira Mikijirō; 21 November 1933 – 23 October 2016) was a Japanese actor. Starting as a stage actor in the 1950s, he also worked in film and television and was active until the time of his death. From the 1970s he starred in several of Yukio Ninagawa's productions, including an acclaimed role as Macbeth. Described as "Japan's best Shakespearean actor", Hira received several awards throughout his career, including an excellence award at the 2011 National Arts Festival hosted by the Japanese government's Agency for Cultural Affairs.

== Biography ==
=== Early life ===
Hira was born in Hiroshima, Hiroshima Prefecture, Japan. After graduating from Joge High School in Jōge, Hiroshima Prefecture, he studied at the training school of the Haiyuza Theatre Company and officially joined the company in 1956. One of his early roles was in a production of Goethe's Faust.

=== Acting career ===
Hira's television debut in the 1963 series Three Outlaw Samurai, in which he played a nihilistic masterless samurai, saw his popularity rise. In 1968 he played Hamlet with the Shiki Theatre Company, a role which received very high reviews.

=== Performance style ===
Hira's stage performances were heralded throughout his career. In 2009, Tokyo University professor emeritus of English literature Yushi Odashima described Hira as Japan's best Shakesperean actor, noting the incandescence he brought to his roles as mythical characters. The range in his performance as King Lear, from solemnness to madness, was praised by Kindai University professor and theatre critic Kojin Nishido. An obituary by the Chunichi Shimbun identified Hira's special ability to deliver profound performances and his high-toned delivery of lines.

=== Personal life ===
Hira married actress Yoshiko Sakuma in 1970 and they had a son, Takehiro, who was born in 1974 and is also an actor. The pair divorced in 1984. In 1998 Hira received a Medal of Honour from the Japanese government and in 2005 he was appointed to the Order of the Rising Sun, 4th Class.

=== Death ===
On October 23, 2016, he died at his home in Setagaya, Tokyo at the age of 82. At the time of his death he had a role in Fuji Television's Monday night drama Cain and Abel, which was taken over by Akira Terao. Hira's final performance, in the second episode of Cain and Abel, was filmed on 29 September and aired on 24 October, shortly after his death. Hira also had a role in NHK's production of Moribito: Guardian of the Spirit. Filming of the second season finished earlier in 2016 and premiered in January 2017. In the third season, which premiered in November 2017, Hira was replaced by Takeshi Kaga.

== Filmography ==
=== Film ===
Year	Title	Role	Director	Notes
1962	The Inheritance	Yasuko's lover	Masaki Kobayashi	
1964	Adventures of Zatoichi	Gounosuke	Kimiyoshi Yasuda	
1964	Three Outlaw Samurai	Einosuke Kikyo	Hideo Gosha	
1965	Sword of the Beast	Gen'nosuke	Hideo Gosha	
1966	The Face of Another	Psychiatrist	Hiroshi Teshigahara	
1968	The Great Adventure of Horus, Prince of the Sun	Grunwald the Demon of Ice	Isao Takahata	Voice
1982	Willful Murder	Superintendent General Okuno	Kei Kumai	
1982	To Trap a Kidnapper	Detective Kenmochi	Shunya Itō	
1985	Early Spring Story	Takenaka	Shinichiro Sawai	
1988	Tokyo: The Last Megalopolis	Yasumasa Hirai	Akio Jissoji	
1988	Oracion	Masuhara	Shigemichi Sugita	
1994	Rampo	Marquis Ōgawara	Rintarō Mayuzumi	
1997	Sharan Q no enka no hanamichi	Daisuke Naruto	Yōjirō Takita	
2001	Pistol Opera	Gorō Hanada	Seijun Suzuki	
2005	Azumi 2: Death or Love	Sanada Masayuki	Shusuke Kaneko	
2005	Princess Raccoon	Azuchi Momoyama	Seijun Suzuki	
2008	Aibō the Movie	Kimihiko Mikuriya	Seiji Izumi	
2009	Goemon	Sen no Rikyū	Kazuaki Kiriya	
2010	13 Assassins	Doi Toshitsura	Takashi Miike	
2011	Ninja Kids!!!	Headmaster Ōkawa	Takashi Miike	
2012	The Tibetan Dog	Tenzing (Adult)	Masayuki Kojima	Voice
2013	The Eternal Zero	Hasegawa	Takashi Yamazaki	

=== Television ===
Year	Title	Role	Network	Notes	Ref.
1963–1969	Three Outlaw Samurai	Einosuke Kikyo	Fuji		
1970	Mominoki wa Nokotta	Kai Harada	NHK	Taiga drama	
1973	Kunitori Monogatari	Saitō Dōsan	NHK	Taiga drama	
1979	Fumō Chitai	Tadashi Iki	TBS		
1988	Takeda Shingen	Takeda Nobutora	NHK	Taiga drama	
1992	Nobunaga	Zuiten	NHK	Taiga drama	
2001	Hōjō Tokimune	Hōjō Shigetoki	NHK	Taiga drama	
2005	Yoshitsune	Emperor Go-Shirakawa	NHK	Taiga drama	
2006	Kemonomichi	Kitō Kōta	TV Asahi		
2007	Mito Kōmon	Tokugawa Mitsusada	TBS		
2008	Atsuhime	Zusho Hirosato	NHK	Taiga drama	
2014	Team Medical Dragon	Shuzō Sakurai	Fuji		
2016	Moribito: Guardian of the Spirit (Season 1)	Hibitonan	NHK		
2016	Shizumanu Taiyō	The Prime Minister Tonegawa	WOWOW		
2016	Cain and Abel (Episodes 1-2)	Sōichirō Takada	Fuji	Final role	
2016	Moribito: Guardian of the Spirit (Season 2)	Hibitonan	NHK		

=== Theater ===
- Antony and Cleopatra
- Cyrano de Bergerac
- Faust
- Hamlet
- Iliad
- King Lear
- Macbeth
- Medea
- The Merchant of Venice
- NINAGAWA Macbeth
- Oedipus Rex
- Othello
- Richard III
- Rokumeikan
- The Tempest
- The Threepenny Opera
- Twelfth Night
- The Winter's Tale

=== Dubbing roles ===
- Atlantis: The Lost Empire (2001) – King Kashekim Nedakh

== Awards and honours ==
=== Awards ===
2008: Asahi Performing Arts Awards - Artist Award (for his performances in King Lear and Yama no Kyojintachi)

=== Honours ===
- Medal of Honour with Purple Ribbon (1998)
- Order of the Rising Sun, 4th Class, Gold Rays with Rosette (2005)
