= The Last War =

The Last War may refer to:

- The Last War (film), known in Japan as Sekai Daisenso ("The Great World War")
- The World Set Free, a 1914 H.G. Wells novel, retitled in 2001
- Tokyo: The Last War, a 1989 Japanese film
- World War I; "the last war" was a frequently used term for World War I, especially in the World War II years.
- World War II; "the last war" was likewise used to refer to the Second World War, especially in the decades immediately following it; less so today.
