= Shibusawa Eiichi =

Japanese business magnate (1840–1931)

Viscount Shibusawa Eiichi
- 渋沢 栄一
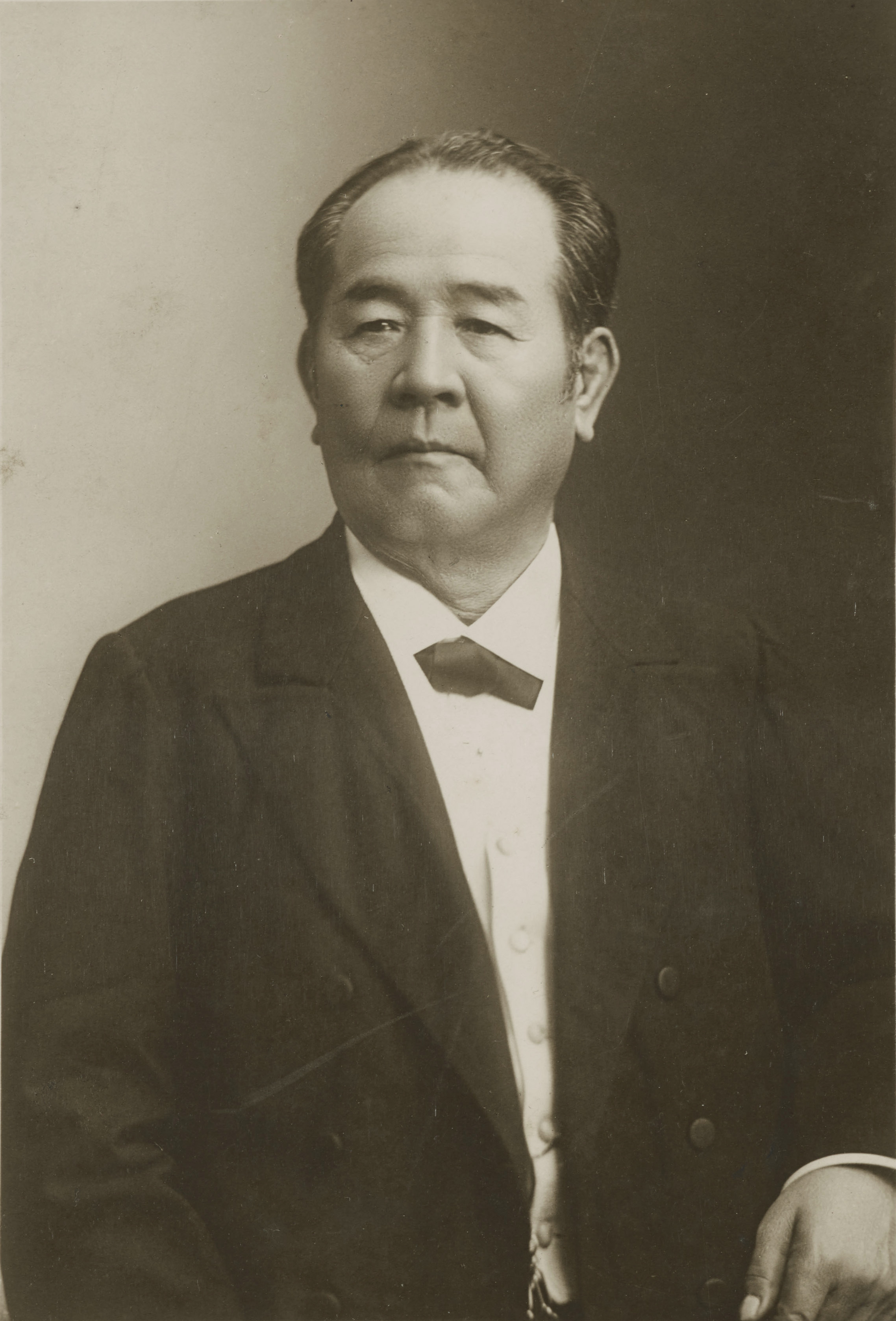
- Portrait, 1921

Member of the House of Peers
- In office 29 September 1890 – 29 October 1891 Nominated by the Emperor

Personal details
- Born: 16 March 1840 Chiaraijima, Hanzawa district, Musashi Province, Tokugawa Shogunate (now Fukaya, Saitama Prefecture)
- Died: 11 November 1931 (aged 91) Motonishigahara, Takinogawa Ward, Kitatoshima District, Tokyo, Empire of Japan (now Nishigahara, Kita Ward, Tokyo)
- Spouses: Odaka Chiyo (m. 1858; died 1882) Kaneko (after 1883)
- Children: Tokuji Shibusawa; Masao Shibusawa
- Relatives: Hozumi Nobushige (son-in-law); Keizo Shibusawa (grandson)
- Occupation: Shogun's retainer; bureaucrat; businessman; philanthropist; politician
- Awards: Grand Cordon of the Order of the Sacred Treasure 4th Class; Grand Order of the Order of the Rising Sun with Pauwlonia Flowers

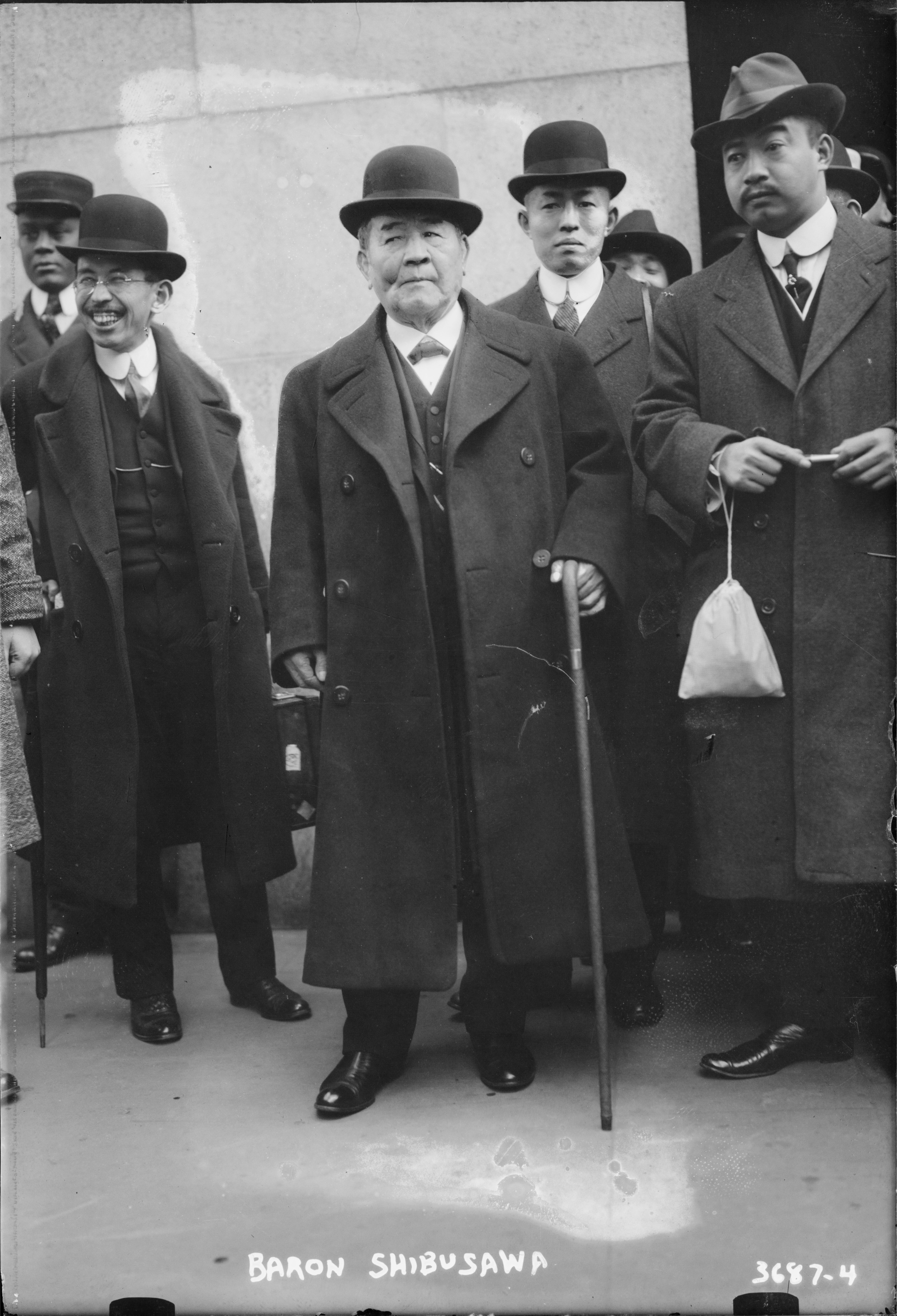
Shibusawa Eiichi, 1st Viscount Shibusawa in New York City in 1915

Shibusawa Eiichi, 1st Viscount Shibusawa (渋沢 栄一; 16 March 1840 – 11 November 1931) was a Japanese business magnate widely known today as the "Father of Japanese capitalism", having introduced Western capitalism to Japan after the Meiji Restoration. He introduced many economic reforms including use of double-entry accounting, joint-stock corporations and modern note-issuing banks.

He founded the first modern bank based on joint stock ownership in Japan. The bank was aptly named The First National Bank (Dai Ichi Kokuritsu Ginkō, now merged into Mizuho Bank) and had the power to issue its own notes. Through this bank, he founded hundreds of other joint stock corporations in Japan. Many of these companies still survive to this day as quoted companies in the Tokyo Stock Exchange, which Shibusawa also founded. The Japanese Chamber of Commerce and Industry was founded by him as well. He was also involved in the foundation of many hospitals, schools, universities (including the first women's university), the Imperial Hotel in Tokyo and charitable organizations including the Japanese Red Cross Society.

Another notable aspect of Shibusawa's career is that, despite being the founder of hundreds of corporations, he refused to maintain a controlling stake in these corporations, effectively preventing himself from forming a zaibatsu. What is known as the Shibusawa zaibatsu was a holding company to look after his estate for his family. The Shibusawa Zaibatsu did not hold any controlling stake in any companies. Despite his humble origin as a farmer, he was granted the title of Viscount, while all other zaibatsu founders were awarded the title of Baron. He was also awarded Shōnii, Second Honour under the ritsuryō rank system, which is usually given to high-ranking nobility and prime ministers.

Shibusawa is featured on the 10,000 yen note, one of the new designs that went into circulation on 3 July 2024. Shibusawa was also printed on bank notes issued by the Korea First Bank, which he owned, in 1902. The choice of Shibusawa has previously been criticised in South Korea.

== Biography ==
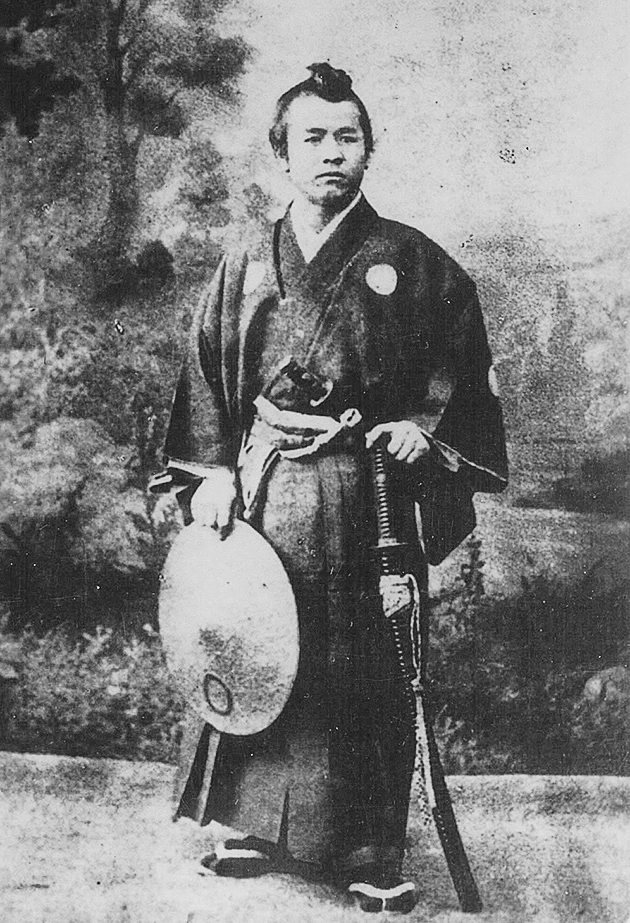
Shibusawa pictured here wearing two swords, a privilege usually reserved for the samurai class, but a privilege also occasionally given to wealthy peasant families like his

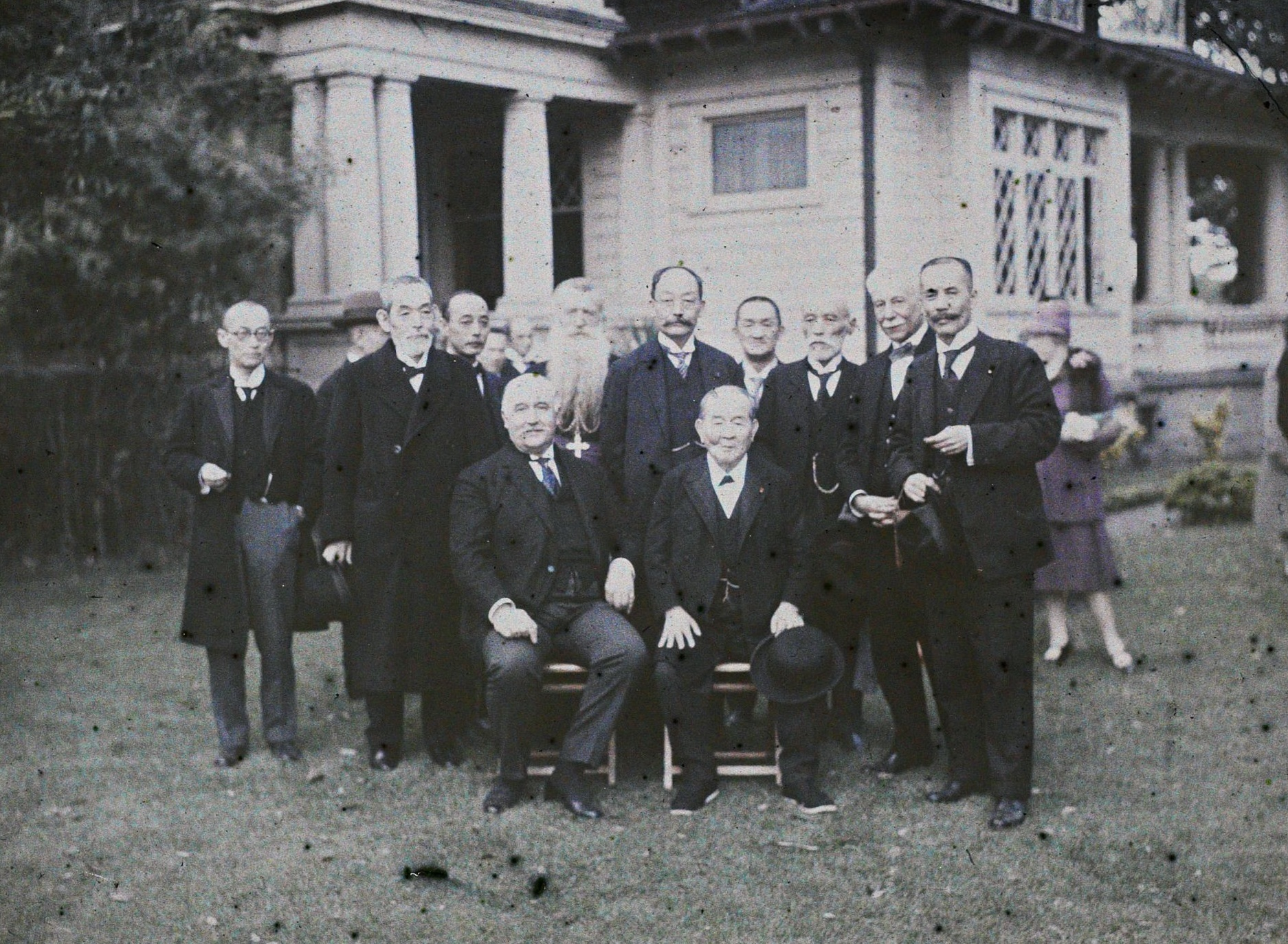
Viscount Shibusawa Eiichi (sitting on the right of the front row) at a welcoming luncheon for the French ambassador Robert de Billy in 1927, Autochrome by Roger Dumas

Shibusawa was born on 16 March 1840, in a farmhouse in Chiaraijima (located in the present-day city of Fukaya in Saitama Prefecture). As a boy, he learned reading and writing from his father. He grew up helping with the family business of dry field farming, indigo production and sale, and silk raising and later studied the Confucian classics and the history of Japan under Odaka Junchu, a scholar who was his cousin.

Under the influence of sonnō jōi (expel the barbarians; revere the emperor) sentiment, he formulated a plan along with cousins and friends to capture Takasaki Castle and set fires in the foreign settlement in Yokohama. Ultimately, however, this plan was canceled and he moved on to Kyoto.

Shibusawa left his hometown at the age of twenty-three, and entered the service of Hitotsubashi Yoshinobu (then in line for the position of shōgun). He distinguished himself by his work in strengthening the household finances of the Hitotsubashi family.

When he was twenty-seven years old, he visited France and other European countries as a member of Tokugawa Akitake's delegation to the Exposition Universelle (1867). On this trip Shibusawa observed modern European societies and cultures for the first time, and realized the importance of industrial and economic development.

After returning from Europe at the news of the change of governments now known as the Meiji Restoration, he established the Shōhō Kaishō, one of the first joint-stock companies in Japan, in Shizuoka Prefecture. Afterwards, he was invited by the Meiji government to become a member of the Ministry of Finance, where he became a driving force in the building of a modern Japan as head of the Kaisei Kakari, or office of the Ministry of Finance in charge of reform.

In 1873 Shibusawa resigned from the Ministry of Finance and became the president of the Dai-Ichi Bank (First National Bank). This was Japan's first modern bank, established under his own guidance while still employed by the Ministry of Finance. With this bank as a base, Shibusawa devoted himself to founding and encouraging businesses of all sorts.

Shibusawa was an advocate throughout his life of the idea that good ethics and business should be in harmony. The number of enterprises in which he was involved as founder or supporter is said to exceed five hundred, and includes Mizuho Financial Group, The 77 Bank, Tokio Marine Nichido, Imperial Hotel, Tokyo Stock Exchange, Tokyo Gas, Toyobo, Tokyu Corporation, Keihan Electric Railway, Taiheiyo Cement, Oji Paper Company, Sapporo Breweries, NYK Line, Tokyo Jinzo Hiryo (Tokyo Artificial Fertilizer Company), and the Gyeongin Railway and the Gyeongbu Railway in Korea. He was president of the Tokyo Chamber of Commerce. Moreover, he spearheaded many works for the betterment of society, and was an enthusiastic supporter of education, especially higher education in the field of business such as current Hitotsubashi University and current Tokyo Keizai University, higher education for women, and private schools. Shibusawa involved himself in some 600 projects related to education, social welfare and others. In addition, Shibusawa made efforts to promote the exchange of goods and good will across national boundaries through private-sector diplomacy. In 1902 he visited Germany, France and the United Kingdom.

In 1920, Baron Shibusawa and members of the Mitsui & Company, along with other Japanese business leaders greeted the first official U.S. business delegation to visit Japan. This U.S. delegation was led by Frank A. Vanderlip accompanied by other US business and political leaders and some of their wives. These visitors included: Harry E. Benedict, Henry W. Taft, Jacob G. Shurman, Darwin Kingsley, Julian Street, Seymour L. Cromwell President of the New York Stock Exchange, Lewis L. Clark, Lyman Judson Gage, American financier and Presidential Cabinet officer, George Eastman American entrepreneur who founded the Eastman Kodak Company. Eiichi Shibusawa had invited these U.S. representatives to visit Japan to bridge their nations diplomatically and promote increased business and commerce.

Shibusawa died at the age of ninety-one on 11 November 1931.

== Humanitarianism during the Late Ottoman genocides ==
During the period of the Late Ottoman genocides, Shibusawa chaired the Armenian Relief Committee of Japan in Tokyo, helping to save the lives of hundreds of Armenian and Greek refugees. Through his efforts, several Japanese newspapers published articles on the subject, spreading awareness and urging individuals to donate and assist however they could.

Shibusawa and the Japanese people managed to gather donations totaling approximately ¥20,000 ($9,569 in 1922; inflation-adjusted roughly $200,000+ in 2026) to help Armenian and Greek victims.

== Honors ==
- Grand Cordon of the Order of the Sacred Treasure (24 August 1911) (Fourth Class: 19 July 1892)
- Grand Cordon of the Order of the Rising Sun with Paulownia Flowers (10 November 1928)
- Honorary member, American Society of Mechanical Engineers (1929)
- Senior Second Rank (10 November 1931)

=== The Nobel Prize ===
Shibusawa was nominated for the Nobel Peace Prize in 1926 by the prime minister of Japan.

== In fiction ==
Shibusawa Eiichi, mainly portrayed by Ryo Yoshizawa, is the main protagonist in the 60th Taiga Drama, Reach Beyond The Blue Sky, aired during 2021 on NHK.

Shibusawa, along with many other famous historical figures from the Meiji Restoration, is also a supporting character in the historical fantasy novel Teito Monogatari by Aramata Hiroshi. In the 1988 adaptation, known in the west as Tokyo: The Last Megalopolis, he is portrayed by renowned Japanese actor Katsu Shintarō. In the animated adaptation his voice is done by Osamu Saka.

Baron Shibusawa is highlighted in the historical novel The Emperor and the Spy by Stan S. Katz. During the 1923 Great Kantō earthquake, Baron Shibusawa is shown actively engaged in assisting many of the Japanese who were injured during that major disaster. The friendship between Baron Shibusawa and Prince Iesato Tokugawa is also presented in this novel.

== See also ==
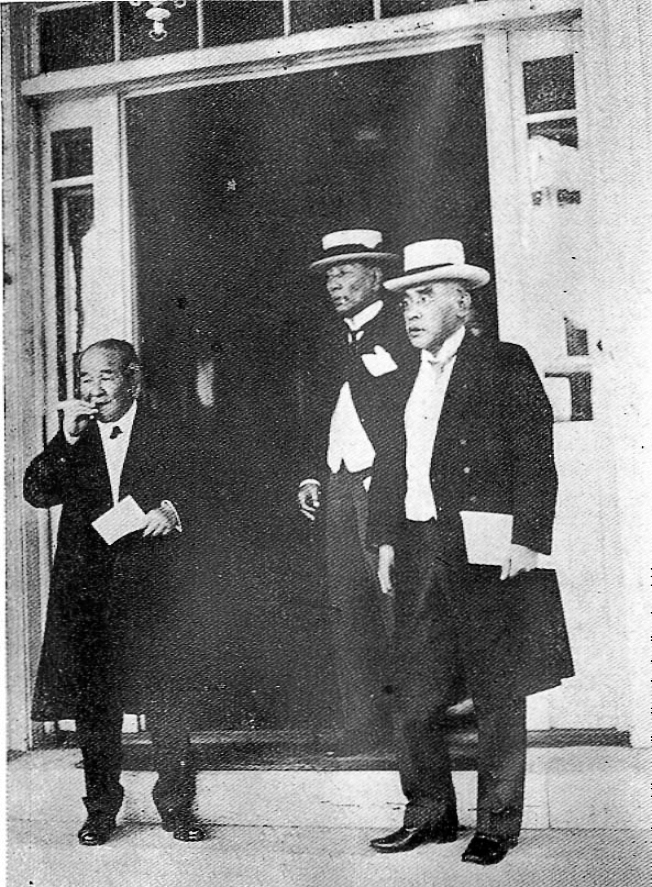
Members of the Capital Restoration Board after 1923 Great Kantō earthquake: from left, Shibusawa, Count Itō Miyoji, Baron Katō Takaaki

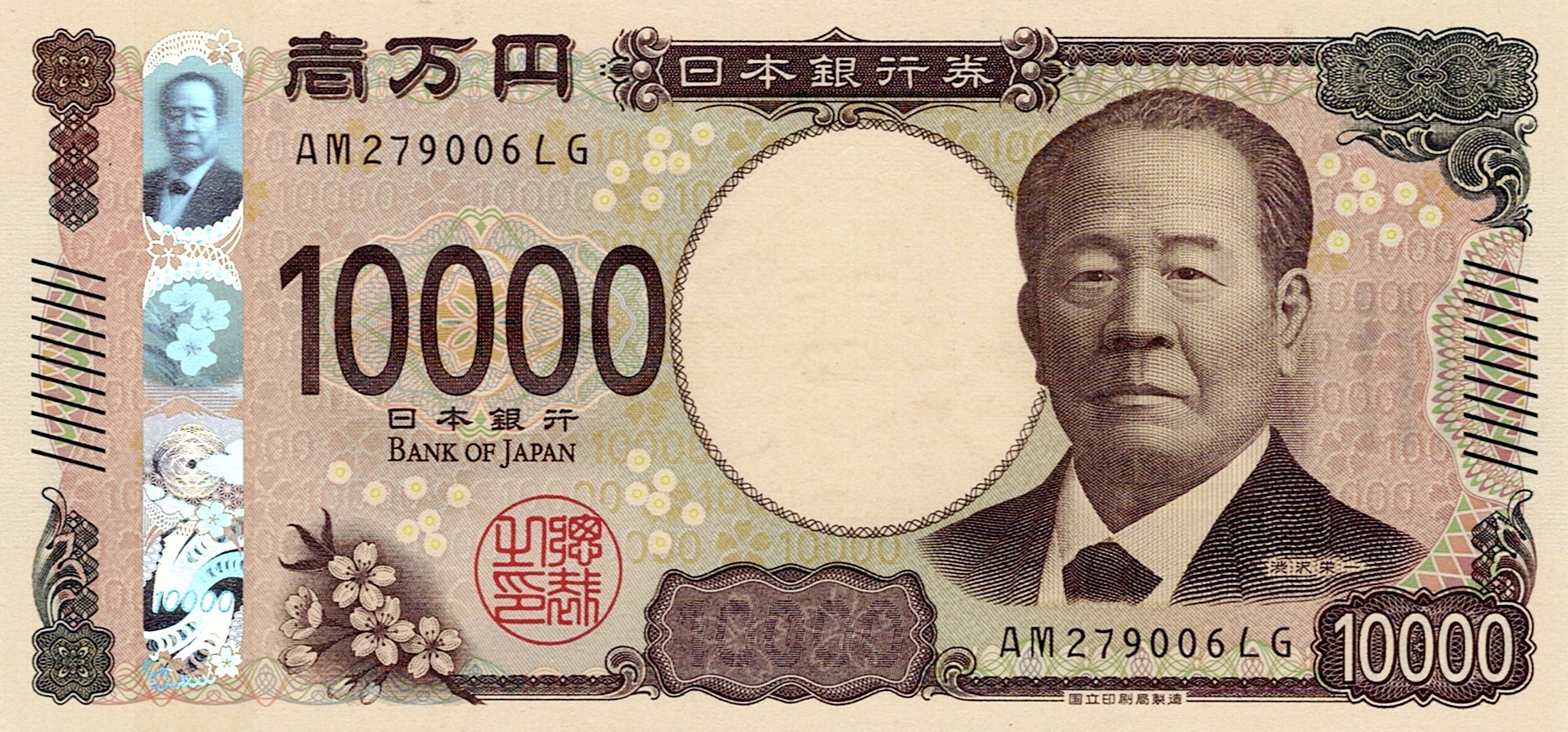
Portrait of Shibusawa on the 10,000 yen banknote

- Reach Beyond The Blue Sky
- Japanese friendship dolls
- Keizo Shibusawa
- Suematsu Kenchō
- Haruko Ichikawa, grand-daughter
