= Kyusaku Shimada =

Japanese actor (born 1955)

- 嶋田 久作
- Born: Tetsuo Shimada; April 24, 1955 (age 71); Totsuka-ku, Yokohama, Kanagawa Prefecture, Japan
- Occupation: Actor
- Years active: 1988–present

Kyusaku Shimada (嶋田 久作, Shimada Kyūsaku; born April 24, 1955) is a Japanese actor.

== History ==
Shimada was originally part of the Tokyo Grand Guignol Theater group, formed by artist Norimizu Ameya. He stayed with the group until its dissolution in 1986. One of the productions the group undertook was an adaptation of the occult novel Teito Monogatari (Hiroshi Aramata) where Shimada played the lead role Yasunori Kato.

He has appeared in films such as Makoto Shinozaki's 0093: Her Majesty's Masao Kusakari and Takahisa Zeze's Pandemic.

== Filmography ==
=== Film ===
- Tokyo: The Last Megalopolis (1988), Yasunori Kato
- Tokyo: The Last War (1989), Yasunori Kato
- Rainbow Kids (1991), Tokyo
- Doomed Megalopolis (1991), Yasunori Kato
- A Watcher in the Attic (1992), Kogoro Akechi
- No Way Back (1995), Tetsuro
- Sada (1998)
- Murder on D Street (1998), Kogoro Akechi
- Sakuya: Demon Slayer (2000), Syuzo
- The Princess Blade (2001), Byakurai
- Vengeance for Sale (2002)
- Dragon Head (2003), Minila
- Devilman (2004)
- 69 (2004)
- Cutie Honey (2004)
- Tomie: Revenge (2005)
- In the Pool (2005)
- Route 225 (2006)
- Forbidden Siren (2006), Policeman
- Udon (2006)
- 0093: Her Majesty's Masao Kusakari (2007)
- Sad Vacation (2007)
- Kamen Rider: The Next (2007), Shindou
- Orochi (2008)
- The Clone Returns Home (2008), Dr. Kageyama
- Tokyo! (2008)
- Masters of Killing (2008)
- K-20: Legend of the Mask (2008)
- Pandemic (2009)
- Soup Opera (2010)
- Abacus and Sword (2010)
- Heaven's Story (2010)
- Kaiji 2 (2011)
- The Woodsman and the Rain (2012)
- Library Wars (2013)
- Angel Home (2013)
- Solomon's Perjury Part 1: Suspicion (2015)
- Solomon's Perjury Part 2: Judgement (2015)
- Maestro! (2015)
- Shin Godzilla (2016)
- 64: Part I (2016)
- The Lies She Loved (2018)
- The Blood of Wolves (2018), Kakomura
- Blue Hour (2019)
- Kohaku (2019)
- Not Quite Dead Yet (2020)
- All the Things We Never Said (2020)
- The Blue Danube (2021)
- First Gentleman (2021)
- A Madder Red (2021)
- Onoda: 10,000 Nights in the Jungle (2021)
- Pure Japanese (2022)
- Tombi: Father and Son (2022)
- What to Do with the Dead Kaiju? (2022), the Minister for Foreign Affairs
- Shin Ultraman (2022), the prime minister of Japan
- Nagi's Island (2022)
- Refugee X (2023), Koike
- Gosh!! (2025)
- Kokuho (2025), Umeki
- Kowloon Generic Romance (2025), Zhou
- The Ogre's Bride (2026), Usui
- The Secret Battlefield (2026), Teiichi Suzuki
- Period (2026)

=== Television ===
- Kōmyō ga Tsuji (2006) as Ogasawara Shōsai
- Kitaro ga Mita Gyokusai - Mizuki Shigeru no Senso (2007)
- Penance (2012)
- Yae's Sakura (2013) as Maki Yasuomi
- Who Killed Daigoro Tokuyama? (2016) as Daigoro Tokuyama
- Naotora: The Lady Warlord (2017) as Ōsawa Mototane
- Half Blue Sky (2018) as Ichiro Tanabe
- Bullets, Bones and Blocked Noses (2021)
- Isoroku Yamamoto in London (2021) as Prince Fushimi Hiroyasu
- What Will You Do, Ieyasu? (2023), Momochi Tanba
- House of Ninjas (2024) as Kosaku Kuze
- Unbound (2025) as Shibano Ritsuzan
- Simulation: Defeat in the Summer of 1941 (2025), Teiichi Suzuki

=== Video games ===
- Kingdom Hearts (2002) as Hades
- Inazuma Eleven (2008) as Reiji Kageyama
- Kingdom Hearts: Birth by Sleep (2010) as Hades
- Kingdom Hearts III (2019) as Hades

=== Dubbing ===
- Hercules (1997) as Hades
