= Masao Nakabori =

Japanese cinematographer

- Born: 中堀 正夫; Arakawa, Tokyo Japan
- Occupation: Cinematographer

Masao Nakabori (中堀 正夫, なかぼり まさお) is a Japanese cinematographer, known as DP of Koreeda's Maborosi. He won the Golden Osella for the film.

== Selected filmography ==
=== TV films ===
- Ultra Seven (ウルトラセブン, 1967)
- Silver Kamen (シルバー仮面, 1971–1972)
- Ultraman Taro (ウルトラマンタロウ, 1973 - 1974)
- Lanterns on Blue Waters (波の盆, 1983)

=== Feature films ===
- This Transient Life (無常, 1970)
- Utamaro's World (歌麿 夢と知りせば, 1977)
- Tokyo: The Last Megalopolis (帝都物語, 1988)
- Ultra Q The Movie: Legend of the Stars (ウルトラQ ザ・ムービー 星の伝説, 1990)
- Edogawa Rampo monogatari: Yaneura no sanpo sha (屋根裏の散歩者, 1992)
- Maborosi (幻の光, 1995)
- Falling Into the Evening (落下する夕方, 1998)
- Murder on D Street (D坂の殺人事件, 1998)
- Return of Happiness (すずらん, 2000)
- Women in the Mirror (鏡の女たち, 2002)
- Blessing Bell (幸福の鐘, 2002)
- Summer of Ubume (姑獲鳥の夏, 2005)
- Dead Run (疾走, 2005)
- Hard Luck Hero (ハードラックヒーロー, 2005)
- The Harimaya Bridge (The Harimaya Bridge はりまや橋, 2009)
