= Gakutensoku =

Japanese robot and first robot in Asia

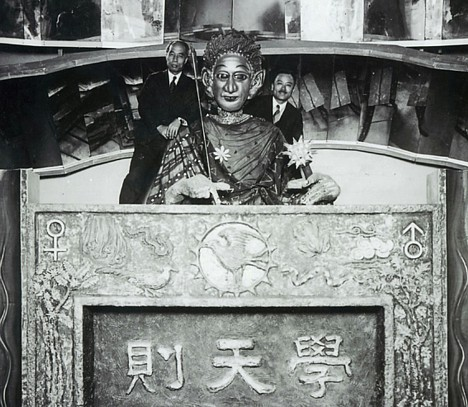
Makoto Nishimura (left of Gakutensoku) and one of his assistants, Bōji Nagao, pose with the robot.

Gakutensoku (Japanese: 學天則; learning from the laws of nature) was the first robot to be built in East Asia and was created in Osaka in the late 1920s. The robot was designed and manufactured by biologist Makoto Nishimura.

== History ==
Nishimura had served as a professor at Hokkaido Imperial University, studied Marimo and was an editorial adviser to the Osaka Mainichi newspaper (now the Mainichi Shimbun). Concerned about the idea of robots seen as slaves to humans, particularly as portrayed in the play R.U.R., written by Karel Čapek, Nishimura set out to build a different kind of robot. The robot he wanted to build would celebrate nature and humanity, and rather than a slave, it would be a friend, and even an inspirational model, to people.

In 1926, Nishimura resigned from Hokkaido Imperial University, moved to Osaka, and started building his robot, with help from a small team of assistants. He named his robot Gakutensoku. Gakutensoku was first displayed in September 1928 in Kyoto, and the following year it was exhibited in Tokyo, Osaka, and Hiroshima, at the Chosun Exhibition in Korea, and in China. Gakutensoku disappeared in the 1930s; the details of its disappearance are unknown.

== Description ==
Gakutensoku could change its facial expression and move its head and hands via an air pressure mechanism. It had a pen-shaped signal arrow in its right hand and a lamp named Reikantō (靈感燈, 'inspiration light') in its left hand. Perched on top of Gakutensoku was a bird-shaped robot named Kokukyōchō (告曉鳥, 'bird informing dawn'). When Kokukyōchō cried, Gakutensoku's eyes closed and its expression became pensive. When the lamp shone, Gakutensoku started to write words with the pen.

== Legacy ==
An asteroid, 9786 Gakutensoku, was named after the robot.

A modern version of Gakutensoku was produced in 2008 by the Osaka Science Museum, where it is now on display.

== Cultural references ==
- Gakutensoku and its creator, Makoto Nishimura, appear in Hiroshi Aramata's novel Teito Monogatari and the subsequent film based on the novel. In the film Makoto is portrayed by his real-life son, actor Kō Nishimura.
- A similar robot named Hisoutensoku is the main feature of the fighting game Touhou Hisōtensoku and was inspired from the Gakutensoku.
- The names of three characters in Murasakiiro no Qualia are based on each of the three kanji in "Gakutensoku".
- Gakutensoku is mentioned in the manga series Keep Your Hands Off Eizouken! and the subsequent anime adaptation.

== See also ==
- Karakuri puppet
