= Murder on D Street =

- DVD cover
- Directed by: Akio Jissoji
- Screenplay by: Akio Satsukawa
- Based on: Case of the Murder on D-Slope by Edogawa Rampo
- Produced by: Takashige Ichise; Mitsuru Kurosawa
- Starring: Hiroyuki Sanada; Kyūsaku Shimada; Yumi Yoshiyuki
- Cinematography: Masao Nakabori
- Edited by: Kiyoaki Saitô
- Music by: Shin'ichirō Ikebe
- Production company: Toei Company
- Release date: May 16, 1998 (Japan)
- Running time: 90 minutes
- Country: Japan
- Language: Japanese

Murder on D Street (Japanese: Ｄ坂の殺人事件, Hepburn: D-Zaka no Satsujin Jiken) is a 1998 Japanese mystery film. It was directed by Akio Jissoji and based on a novel by Edogawa Rampo.

== Cast ==
- Hiroyuki Sanada as Seiichiro Fukiya
- Kyūsaku Shimada as Kogoro Akechi
- Yumi Yoshiyuki
- Yūko Daike

== Reception ==
=== Awards ===
20th Yokohama Film Festival

- Won: Best Supporting Actress - Yumi Yoshiyuki
