= Lanterns on Blue Waters =

1983 Japanese television film by Akio Jissoji

- Film poster
- Directed by: Akio Jissoji
- Screenplay by: Sō Kuramoto
- Produced by: Shigeru Umetani
- Starring: Chishū Ryū; Eri Ishida
- Cinematography: Masao Nakabori
- Edited by: Keiichi Uraoka
- Music by: Tōru Takemitsu
- Production companies: Nippon Television; TV Man Union
- Release date: November 15, 1983 (Japan)
- Running time: 112 minutes
- Country: Japan
- Language: Japanese

Lanterns on Blue Waters (Japanese: 波の盆, Hepburn: Nami no Bon; lit. Bon Festival on the Waves) is a 1983 Japanese television film directed by Akio Jissoji. Nippon Television produced the film.

== Story ==
It is about a Japanese American in Hawaii, Kosaku Yamanami, who recalls his life during the historical events of World War II. A family get-together takes place in the present day as he recalls his past.

== Cast ==
- Kosaku Yamanami (山波 公作 Yamanami Kōsaku) - Chishū Ryū
- Misa (ミサ) - Eri Ishida

== Production ==
Filming took place in Lahaina, Hawaii, in the summer of 1983. 300 Japanese Americans extras were used to film a scene at a temple.

== Music ==
Tōru Takemitsu composed the film's score. Kyōko Koizumi, author of Tōru Takemitsu's Seigenki (Time within Memory): An Anti-Experimental, Tonal Film Score, stated that fans "loved" this theme. Takemitsu's friend Shuntaro Tanikawa said that the best musical score Takemitsu ever made was the one for this film, though Takemitsu disliked his friend's statement.

== Release ==
The film was aired in Hawaii on Nippon Golden Network (NGN). The English subtitles were done by James Araki, the chairperson of the University of Hawaii at Manoa East Asian Language and Literature Department.

== Reception ==
In 1983, the Ministry of Education, Science, Sports and Culture ranked Lanterns on Blue Waters as the best television drama.
