= This Transient Life =

1970 film

- Film poster
- Directed by: Akio Jissoji
- Written by: Toshirô Ishidô
- Produced by: Toyoaki Dan; Kinshirô Kuzui
- Starring: Ryō Tamura; Michiko Tsukasa
- Cinematography: Yuzo Inagaki; Masao Nakabori; Kazumi Oneda
- Edited by: Yoshihiro Yanagawa
- Music by: Toru Fuyuki
- Production companies: Art Theatre Guild; Jissoji Productions
- Distributed by: Art Theatre Guild
- Release date: 8 August 1970
- Running time: 143 minutes
- Country: Japan
- Language: Japanese

This Transient Life (無常, Mujō) is a 1970 Japanese erotic drama film directed by Akio Jissoji, in his feature directorial debut. It is the first film in Jissoji's Buddhist Trilogy. Starring Ryō Tamura and Michiko Tsukasa, it follows a young man who falls in love with his sister and gets her pregnant. After a monk from a nearby Buddhist Monastery finds out, the young man becomes an assistant to a master sculptor, only to proceed to complicate matters with his affairs. The film won the Golden Leopard at the Locarno International Film Festival.

== Cast ==
- Ryō Tamura as Masao (brother)
- Michiko Tsukasa as Yuri (sister)
- Kozo Yamamura as father
- Kin Sugai as mother
- Kotobuki Hananomoto as Iwashita (the servant)
- Akiji Kobayashi
- Eiji Okada as Mori (the sculptor)
- Mitsuko Tanaka as Mori's second wife
- Isao Sasaki as Mori's Son
- Minori Terada
- Haruhiko Okamura as Ogino (Buddhist priest)
