= Sim-Feng Shui =

Japanese literary, film, and video game series

- Cover of VERSION 4.0 Reprint
- Author: Hiroshi Aramata
- Language: Japanese
- Genre: Fantasy; Horror
- Publisher: Kadokawa Shoten
- Published: 1993--2001
- Media type: Print (hardcover and paperback)

Sim-Feng Shui (シム・フースイ, Shimu-Fūsui) is a supernatural fiction literary series about the exploits of a group of feng shui experts and their conflicts with various spiritual disturbances across Japan. Volume 4.0 of the series has been adapted into a live action film and a video game for the PlayStation. The series is a spin off of Hiroshi Aramata's Teito Monogatari series.

== Characters ==
- Tatsuto Kuroda: the grandson of Shigemaru Kuroda, a feng shui practitioner.
- Mizuchi Ariyoshi: a female psychic who helps Kuroda.
- Otsu: Mizuchi's animal companion, a black cat.

== Volumes in the main series ==
- Version 1.0: ワタシnoイエ
- Version 2.0: 二色人（ニイルピト）の夜
- Version 3.0: 新宿チャンスン
- Version 4.0: 闇吹く夏
- Version 5.0: 絶の島事件

== Tokyo Dragon ==
Tokyo Dragon
- Cover of the VHS Edition
- Directed by: Keiji Kataoka
- Written by: Keiko Nobumoto; Based on the novel by: Hiroshi Aramata
- Produced by: Misako Sata; Hisashi Iino
- Starring: Kippei Shina; Misa Shimizu; Emiri Nakayama; Mickey Curtis
- Music by: Toshiyuki Honda
- Release date: 1997
- Country: Japan
- Language: Japanese

In 1997, Version 4.0 of the series was adapted into a made for TV film entitled Tokyo Dragon (東京龍) produced and released by Ace Pictures.

== Video game ==
Volume 4.0 (闇吹く夏) of the series was also adapted into an Action-adventure game for the PlayStation released in 1999.

Front and back cover art of the PS1 game case
