= Tokyo: The Last War =

- Theatrical poster
- Directed by: Takashige Ichise
- Screenplay by: Kaizo Hayashi
- Based on: Teito Monogatari by Hiroshi Aramata
- Produced by: Takashige Ichise; Satoshi Kanno
- Starring: Masaya Kato; Kaho Minami; Kyūsaku Shimada; Naoko Nozawa; Tetsuro Tamba; Yoshio Tsuchiya; Tadao Nakamura
- Cinematography: Shohei Ando
- Edited by: Keiichi Itagaki
- Music by: Koji Ueno
- Production company: Exe/Imagica
- Distributed by: Toho Studios
- Release date: 1989
- Country: Japan
- Language: Japanese
- Box office: ¥350,000,000

Tokyo: The Last War (Japanese: 帝都大戦, Hepburn: Teito Taisen; lit. "The Great War in the Capital") is a 1989 Japanese epic tokusatsu historical dark fantasy/science fiction film directed by Takashige Ichise and distributed by Toho Studios. It is an adaptation of the eleventh book (Great War in the Capital) of the Teito Monogatari novel by Hiroshi Aramata. It is the second cinematic adaptation of the Teito Monogatari series and is a sequel to Tokyo: The Last Megalopolis.

== Plot ==
The sequel begins in 1945, during a period extensive of American firebombing over major Japanese cities. Desperate to end the war quickly, the government concocts a plan to eliminate major key leaders of each country. With the support of the Japanese government, the Buddhist shaman Kan'nami Kouou (Tetsuro Tamba) plans to curse the leaders of the Allied forces using magic. Unfortunately, the spirits of those civilians who were horribly killed during the fire bombings culminate together and reincarnate Yasunori Kato (Kyūsaku Shimada), an oni.

Kato sets off to sabotage Kouou's plan so that the war will continue and Tokyo will be destroyed. To challenge Kato, Kouou has hired a young man, Yuko Nakamura (Masaya Kato), who has incredible psychic abilities. During the course of the story, Nakamura meets and falls in love with Yukiko Tatsumiya (Kaho Minami), a descendant of Taira no Masakado, who is Tokyo's guardian spirit. She is working as a nurse in a War Victims Hospital and still suffering from traumatic memories of abuse as a child by Kato. Nakamura is unable to contend with Kato's mighty powers and after several battles (the final involving his power being enhanced through artificial means), he is nearly killed.

Despite nearing death, Yukiko's power gives Nakamura enough strength to perform one final technique which successfully destroys Kato's physical body. Meanwhile, Kouou realizes that Japan is doomed to lose the war. Thus he changes targets, sparing the Allied leaders, and launching a psychic attack against Adolf Hitler which drives him to commit suicide in his bunker. Yukiko prays to the spirit of Taira no Masakado to seal away Kato's soul. Nakamura expires from his wounds.

After the war, Tokyo's citizens work to rebuild the ruined city. The final shot is of Masakado's grave, clean and still standing amidst the reconstruction.

== Production ==
The box-office success of Tokyo: The Last Megalopolis prompted a sequel to immediately be put into production. The film also marked the directorial debut of Takashige Ichise, a Japanese film producer best known in the west for financing such J-Horror classics as Ring, Ju-on: The Grudge, and Dark Water as well as their respective Hollywood remakes. Producer Takashige Ichise had considered asking director Akio Jissoji, the director of the previous movie, to helm the sequel. In the meantime, the Saison Group, which Ichise was a member of, began to show signs of decline—resulting in the production budget being reduced to half the cost of the original film. Ichise reached out to Hong Kong director Lam Ngai Kai to direct the movie. However he was unable to fulfill his role due to concerns about communication with the Japanese staff. With the film already in preproduction, Ichise was persuaded to take on the role of the director himself. Ichise also took on the role of casting director.

With fewer resources, Ichise determined the sequel should be more akin to an action movie than an epic film. This change was also made in response to criticisms that the plot of the first movie had been difficult for general audiences to understand. The plot adapted only a single book in the series (as opposed to the first film, which had adapted the plot of four books). The only returning actor from the previous film was Kyūsaku Shimada, reprising his role as the supernatural villain Yasunori Kato. Screaming Mad George special effects unit was commissioned to do gore effects.

The open set was built in Sasebo, Nagasaki Prefecture, on a scale larger than that of Tokyo: The Last Megalopolis. Filming took place in Nagasaki for about a month, but was marred by continuous rain . Miniatures were hardly used as in the previous film, and the action scenes were centered on the open set. In future interviews, Ichise remarked that the experience was extremely stressful, stating "It's impossible to be both director and producer at the same time, and I never want to be a director again."

== Differences from the novel ==
The film makes many deviations from the original plot of the novel. In the original book "Great War in the Capital", the target of the spiritual assassination is not Adolf Hitler, but rather Franklin Roosevelt. In the book, Kato is not magically "resurrected" as depicted in the film. Rather he is engaged in fighting off Japanese occupation in China. When he hears of the project, he returns to Japan to make sure it goes through to completion and systematically kills any political figure that opposes it. The leader of the protesters is Tomasso, an Italian mystic who controls the Japanese freemasonry lodges. At the end of the book, Kato kills Tomasso and the project goes to completion. Roosevelt is cursed, suffers from polio and dies. This clears the way for Harry Truman to step into office, who authorizes the Hydrogen Bomb to be used against Japan. Also the mystic hired to curse Roosevelt is Ōtani Kōzui, a famous Buddhist missionary, instead of Kan'nami Kouou (a completely fictional character).

== Home video releases ==
The film and its sequel were both released in Japan on Blu-ray on August 8, 2015, in a Special Edition bundle featuring new cover art by SPFX artist Shinji Higuchi.

The film did not have a North American release until 2024, when Media Blasters licensed and released the film on Blu-Ray under the Title "Doomed Megalopolis: The Last War". It features the movie in Japanese with English Subtitles and commentary by special effects artist Rodd Matsui.
