= Torahiko Terada =

Japanese physicist and writer (1878–1935)

- 寺田寅彦
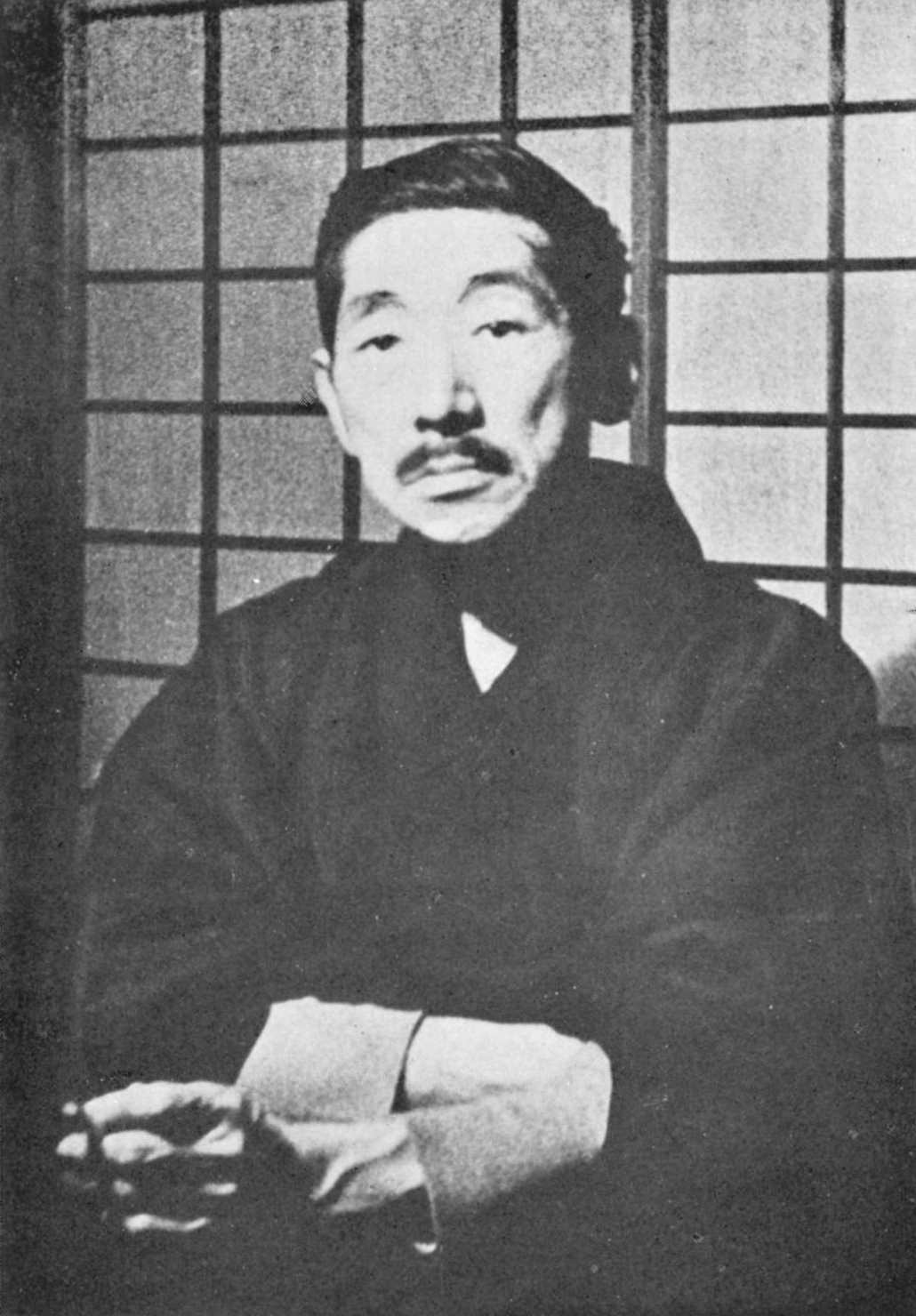
- Born: December 28, 1878; Tokyo, Japan
- Died: December 31, 1935 (aged 57)
- Education: College of Science, Tokyo Imperial University
- Scientific career
- Fields: Physics
- Workplaces: Tokyo Imperial University, Earthquake Research Institute, RIKEN
- Doctoral advisor: Hantaro Nagaoka
- Notable students: Ukichiro Nakaya

Torahiko Terada (寺田 寅彦, Terada Torahiko; November 28, 1878 – December 31, 1935) was a Japanese physicist and author who was born in Tokyo. He was a professor at Tokyo Imperial University, a researcher at RIKEN, and worked on a wide range of topics in physics. He was also a professor at the Earthquake Research Institute.

As an author, he studied under Natsume Sōseki, who was a teacher at his high school in Kumamoto. His pseudonym for his literature-related work was Fuyuhiko Yoshimura.

He is best known for his numerous essays on a wide variety of topics ranging from science to manga.

== Biography ==
Torahiko Terada was born in 1878 in the Tokyo Kojimachi District. He was named "Torahiko" because he was born under the Year of the Tiger. While in high school in Kumamoto, the young Torahiko studied under Natsume Sōseki and science teacher Takuro Tamaru. It was the influence of both men whom Terada attributed his inspiration to seriously pursue studies of science and literature during the course of his life.

In 1897, Terada met and courted student Natsuko Sakai, who was to become his first wife. He continued his studies and in 1899, earned his PhD at the Tokyo Imperial University. His thesis concerned the acoustics of the Shakuhachi bamboo flute. His adviser during this period was Hantaro Nagaoka and Aikitsu Tanakadate.

In 1902, Natsuko Sakai died, prompting Terada to move on. In 1903, he graduated from the Experimental Physics Department of Tokyo Imperial University with chief honors. During this period, he courted Yutako Hamaguchi, who was to become his second wife.

Finally in 1908, Terada obtained his Doctor of Science Degree and was elected to the position of an associate professor at Tokyo Imperial University. From there, he went to study abroad at the University of Berlin. While studying in Stockholm, he corresponded with Swedish physicist Svante Arrhenius. In 1911, Terada made the trek back home to Japan by way of Paris, the UK and the United States.

When he returned to Japan, he was assigned to oceanography studies by the Ministry of Agriculture and Commerce. His results were published in the book Umi no Butsurigaku, published in 1913. Around this same period, Terada became heavily involved in studies of x-ray diffraction. Inspired by the work of Max von Laue, Terada devised a technique for greatly accelerating the photography process used for data gathering in these studies. However, Terada failed to get his results sent to Nature in time due to the distance of Japan from the publisher's location. Consequently, the 1915 Nobel Prize in Physics was awarded to William Henry Bragg and William Lawrence Bragg, who had come to the same discoveries through their research. Terada turned away from X-ray diffraction studies and did not encourage his students to pursue the course. Despite this setback, Terada was still awarded the 7th Imperial Prize of the Japan Academy for his work in 1917. It was at about this same time that his second wife, Yutako, died. After recovering, he courted Shin Sakai in 1918, who was to be his third and final spouse.

In 1922, Terada attended the welcome party for Albert Einstein during the physicist's visit to Japan.

In 1923, the Great Kantō earthquake struck, prompting Terada to seriously begin investigations of the causes of the phenomenon. This led to the development of a new field of earthquake studies. In 1924, Terada was elected to the position of senior researcher at RIKEN Institute. In 1926, he founded the Earthquake Research Institute at the Tokyo Imperial University and served as one of the senior professors there. His research continued to develop and gain attention, and in 1928 he was elected as one of senior staff of Japan's Imperial Academy.

In 1935, Terada began suffering from a bone tumor. He died on December 31, at the age of 57. His ashes were buried in a cemetery next to his childhood home in Kochi. The house has since been transformed into Torahiko Terada Memorial Museum.

== Legacy ==
The small planet 6514 Torahiko is named in honor of him.

=== In fiction ===
- The character of the scientist Kangetsu Mizushima, from Natsume Sōseki's novel I Am A Cat, is believed to have been modeled off Torahiko Terada.
- Torahiko Terada, along with many other historical figures from the Meiji Restoration, is a central character in the award-winning 1985 historical fantasy novel Teito Monogatari by Hiroshi Aramata.
- The comedic play Fuyuhiko and the Good Luck Cat (1987) by Makino Nozomi is based on the life of Torahiko Terada (the title being derived from Terada's pseudonym Fuyuhiko Yoshimura). The play is a dramatization of Terada's life after the loss of his second wife, and his stress in holding his family together in the face of his third marriage. The production won the Yomiuri Theater Award in 1998.

== List of books available in English ==
- Terada, Torahiko (1985). Scientific Papers. Iwanami Shoten. ISBN 4-00-200467-8.
- Terada, Torahiko; translated by Yoshiyuki Suito (1988). Persimmon Seeds. Fukuoka: Yoshiyuki Saito.
