= Makoto Nishimura =

Japanese biologist and inventor

Makoto Nishimura (西村 真琴, Nishimura Makoto; 1883 – 1956) was a Japanese biologist. He is most renowned as the inventor of Gakutensoku, Japan's first functional robot. He was the father of actor Kō Nishimura.

== Biography ==
Makoto was born on March 26, 1883, in Matsumoto, Nagano Prefecture.

During his life, he served as an example for early environmentalists. When he discovered a tree growing on his plot of land, he refused to cut it down. Instead he decided to build his house around it so that it grew in his living room.

Over the years, he worked as a professor at Hokkaido University as well as taught in Kyoto and Manchuria. He also studied botany at Columbia University.
