= Akio Jissoji =

Japanese television and film director (1937–2006)

- 実相寺昭雄
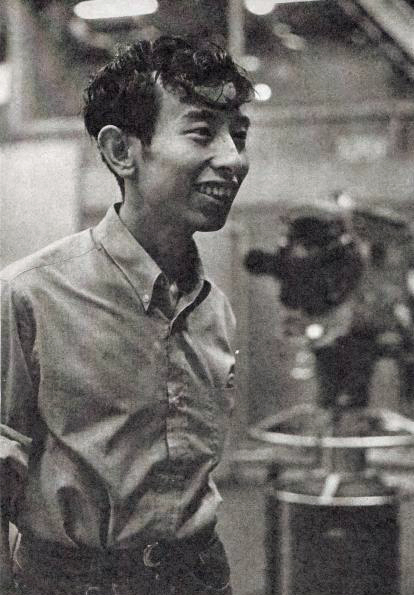
- Jissoji in 1962
- Born: March 29, 1937; Shinjuku-ku, Tokyo, Japan
- Died: November 29, 2006 (aged 69); Tokyo, Japan
- Occupation: Film director
- Spouse: Chisako Hara

Akio Jissoji (実相寺昭雄, Jissōji Akio; March 29, 1937 – November 29, 2006) was a Japanese television and film director best known outside Japan for the 1960s tokusatsu TV series Ultraman and Ultraseven, as well as for his auteur erotic ATG-produced Buddhist trilogy Mujo (無常), Mandala (曼陀羅), and Uta (哥).

He was also known for his film adaptations of Japanese horror author Edogawa Rampo. Jissoji possessed a very distinctive visual style that was notable even in Japanese cinema which is known internationally for its visual style. Every project he directed, from children's action shows to disturbing adult films had an uncompromising approach to cinematic story telling. His episodes of the Ultraman TV shows are unique and quite unusual for children's television. His career is also unusual in that he went back and forth from children's television to film projects that were sexually provocative in some way or another. It is perhaps this aspect of his work that has prevented wider distribution of his films. Sadomasochistic and non-consensual sexual practices are featured in many of his film works with women receiving the brunt of the abuse. Most of his work is not available outside Japan or with English subtitles.

Other notable films include:

- Utamaro: Yume to Shiriseba (歌麿 夢と知りせば; Utamaro's World, 1977), a visually sumptuous telling of the famed Japanese printmaker's life centering on the years he was forced to make pornographic prints for a living.
- Tokyo: The Last Megalopolis (帝都物語, Teito Monogatari; 1988), a live-action science fiction/horror film.
- Rampo Jigoku (乱歩地獄; 2005), Jissoji directed the lead segment of this horror anthology.
- Yume Jū-ya (ユメ十夜; Ten Nights of Dreams, 2006), Jissoji contributed a selection in this anthology of short films based on the writings of Natsume Sōseki.

He died of stomach cancer, aged 69, in his birth city of Tokyo in 2006 just after starting work on a revival of his Silver Mask live action children's show.

== Filmography ==
- The Father of Ultra Q (1966)
- Mujo (1970)
- Mandala (1971)
- Poem (1972)
- Ultraman (1979)
- Lanterns on Blue Waters (1983)
- Tokyo: The Last Megalopolis (1987)
- Ultra Q The Movie: Legend of the Stars (1990)
- Murder on D Street (1998)
- Rampo Noir (2005)

== Television ==
- Ultraman (6 episodes; 1966–67)
- Ultraseven (1967–68)
- Return of Ultraman (1 episode; 1971–72)
- Silver Kamen (2 episodes; 1971–1972)
