= Gohō dōji =

Spirit from Japanese Buddhist folklore

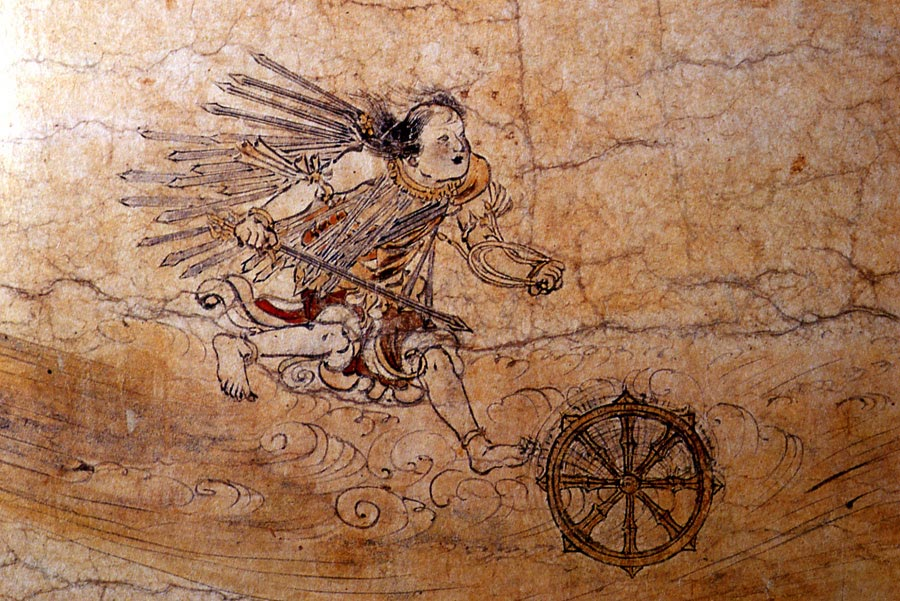
A classic illustration of a gohō dōji from the Shigisan-engi

A gohō dōji (護法童子) (child of the defense of the Law) is a type of guardian spirit from Japanese Buddhist folklore devoted to serving followers of the dharma. In classic stories from medieval collections such as the Uji Shui Monogatari, it is generally depicted as a young boy wearing a collar of swords, with a large sword in one hand and a noose in the other. It flies through the air by riding a Wheel of Dharma.

== See also ==
- Dharmapala
- Four Kumaras – A group of semi-divine sage boys in Hinduism
- Fudō-myōō
- Putto – In Greco-Roman mythology and Renaissance Christian art
- Shikigami
