= Hiroshi Aramata =

Japanese writer

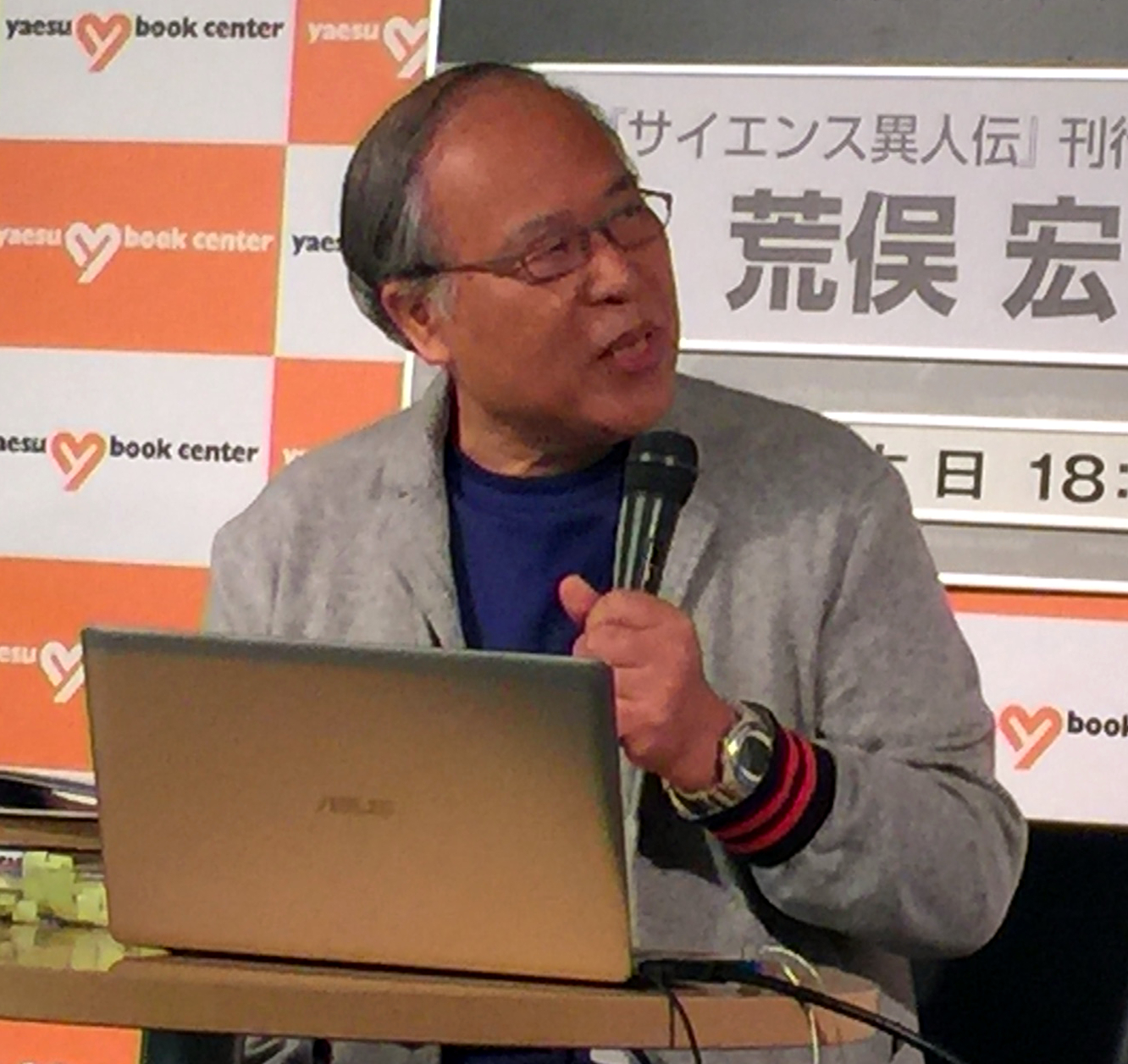
- Aramata in 2015
- Born: July 12, 1947 (age 79); Tokyo, Japan
- Education: Keio University
- Occupations: Writer, polymath, translator, natural historian, scholar, literary critic, art critic, professor
- Writing career
- Notable work: Teito Monogatari
- Notable awards: 1987 Nihon SF Taisho Award for Teito Monogatari 1989 Suntory Prize (サントリー学芸賞) for Illustrated Natural History: Fish of the World 1996 Eiji Yoshikawa Award for Curve of the Hook: An Interview with Yosihiko H. Sinoto 2007 NISTEP (Navigator for Japan's Science and Technology) Award for 「サイエンスとアートの融合した展示の企画」 exhibition 2014 Kinema Junpo Reader's Choice Award

Hiroshi Aramata (荒俣 宏, Aramata Hiroshi; born July 12, 1947) is a Japanese author, polymath, critic, translator and specialist in natural history, iconography and cartography. His most popular novel was Teito Monogatari (Tale of the Capitol), which has sold over 5 million copies in Japan alone.

== Biography ==
Aramata was born in Tokyo. As a child, he was an intense bibliophile and avid collector of old books.

Following his entrance into middle school he was mentored by acclaimed translator Hirai Te'ichii (who was responsible for providing the Japanese translations of the complete works of Lafcadio Hearn as well as Bram Stoker's Dracula). After finishing high school, he immediately entered Keio University in 1966. He heavily studied Western/Oriental magic and occult sciences. He graduated with a degree in law.

Around this time, he moonlighted as a Japanese translator for classic fantasy literature. The Japanese translations he produced during this period include H.P. Lovecraft's acclaimed novella The Shadow Out of Time, Lin Carter's study Tolkien: A Look Behind "The Lord of the Rings", Lord Dunsany's fantasy works The Gods of Pegāna, The Charwoman's Shadow and The Travel Tales of Mr. Joseph Jorkens; George Macdonald's Lilith, William Hope Hodgson's The Night Land and The House on the Borderland; Abraham Merritt's The Ship of Ishtar and Robert E. Howard's Conan the Barbarian novel, Hour of the Dragon.

Although involved in a variety of projects, his main source of income was working as a full-time computer programmer and systems engineer. Circa 1979, he was browsing through old bookstores at Tokyo University in the Kanda District and rediscovered lost natural history collections by Oro Bakufu and Georges Cuvier. This helped to reignite his interest in the field of natural history.

During this period Aramata participated in the development of the Heibonsha World Encyclopedia. While working on the Encyclopedia, he communicated with anthropologist Komatsu Kazuhiko, who communicated with him about many sources of strange and mysterious phenomena in Japanese folklore. Intrigued and excited by the information, Aramata decided that he wanted to write fiction as a way to share such esoteric knowledge with general readers.

Thus as a small side project, he began writing a novel entitled Teito Monogatari that would incorporate elements of lesser known Eastern occult phenomena with recognizable modern Japanese history. When the novel was published in 1985, it became a bestseller and earned him a great amount of recognition and prestige.

The success of Teito Monogatari provided him the necessary financial resources to fund his various natural history related compendiums. In 1987 he began publishing the Atlas Anima, which introduced the works of Conrad Gessner and Georges-Louis Leclerc, Comte de Buffon to modern Japanese readers. Subsequently, this work is credited with eventually leading to a rediscovery of Western Natural History in Japan.

Since then, his reputation has grown increasingly popular in Japan as a man renowned for his encyclopedic knowledge on various subjects. He is one of Japan's most prolific writers, having authored and translated over a hundred different books, both fictional and non-fictional. His works span a wide range of topics from the occult to natural history, literary criticism, biology, cartography, and iconography. He is also known for his "Aramata Collection", a private library housing thousands of rare books from the 18th and 19th centuries.

He has served as a judge on the Osamu Tezuka Cultural Prize since its inception and has done likewise for the Japan Fantasy Novel Award. He is also a member of the Science Fiction and Fantasy Writers of Japan association.

He was also an admirer and close friend of manga artist Shigeru Mizuki. Along with acclaimed yokai expert Natsuhiko Kyogoku, Aramata is a senior member of Shigeru Mizuki's Kwai (Scary Team) Organization. He also was one of the producers of the "Oh! Mizuki Shigeru" Exhibition in Tokyo.

He had a cameo appearance in a horror film directed by Kōji Shiraishi, titled Noroi: The Curse, released in 2005. He was cast in a minor role, including Dankan and Ai Iijima.

In 2010, he served as General Producer of Nagoya's 400th anniversary festival.

== Works Translated into English ==
- Birds of the World as painted by 19th-century artists (Crown Publishing, 1989, ISBN 0517573741)
- Fish of the world: a collection of 19th-century paintings (Portland House, 1990, ISBN 0517030489)
- "The Road" (short story) (Lair of the Hidden Gods: Vol 3, Kurodahan Press, 2006, ISBN 490207513X)
- Curve of the Hook: An Archaeologist in Polynesia (University of Hawaii Press, 2016, ISBN 0824866231)

== Selected works ==
- Encyclopedia of Fantasy Authors (世界幻想作家事典 国書刊行会) (1979)
- "Great Age of Natural History: Dream of Evolution" (「大博物学時代―進化と超進化の夢」) (1982) (ISBN 4-87502-090-2)
- Natural History of Illustrated Reference Books (図鑑の博物誌) (Libro Port, March 1984)
- "History of Paranoiac Creation" (「パラノイア創造史」) (Chikuma Shobo, November 1985)
- Teito Monogatari (帝都物語) (12 volumes) (Kadokawa Shoten, 1985–1989)
- World Natural History Encyclopedia (世界大博物図鑑) (5 volumes) (1987–1994)
- Books Beautiful—The History of Illusutrated Books (絵のある本の歴史) (Heibonsha, 1987) (ISBN 4582253024)
- Dark Chronicle of the Earth (地球暗黒記) (3 volumes) (Kadokawa, 1988–1989)
- Around the Mark (標の周辺) (1988)
- Japan Yokai Pilgrimage Group (日本妖怪巡礼団) (Shueisha Inc, 1989) (ISBN 978-4087497731)
- Overlord of the Sea (海覇王) (Kadokawa, 1989) (ISBN 978-4048725613)
- Birds of the World: as Painted by 19th Century Artists (Crown Publishers, 1989) (ISBN 0517573741)
- Kingdom of Flowers (花の王国) (4 volumes) (Heibonsha Inc, 1990)
- Shirakaba School Story: An Odd Love (愛情生活白樺記) (Shinchosha, October 1990)
- Anecdotes about the Scientists of Greater East Asia (大東亜科学綺譚) (Chikuma Shobo, January 1991) (ISBN 978-4480032065)
- Aesthetics of Anatomy (解剖の美学) (Libroport, September 1991)
- Adventure into the Forbidden Space—Visit to the Treasure Houses of Japan (開かずの間の冒険―日本全国お宝蔵めぐり) (Heibonsha, November 1991)
- Hiroshi Aramata's Introduction to Iconography (荒俣宏の図像学入門) (December 1992)
- My Book Life (ブックライフ自由自在) (Ohta Books, June 1992)
- Sim-Feng Shui (シム・フースイ) (5 volumes) (Kadokawa Bunko, 1993–2001)
- Hunting the Tree Spirit (木精狩り) (April 1994) (ISBN 978-4163489803)
- Trip to the Southern Ocean Splendor (南洋光彩紀行) (January 1995)
- Emperor's Fantasy--Alexander's War Chronicles (幻想皇帝―アレクサンドロス戦記) (3 volumes) (Kadokawa Shoten, 1996–1997)
- Guide to a Suspicious Hot Spring (妖しの秘湯案内) (December 1996) (ISBN 978-4093663816)
- Summer Darkness Breeze (闇吹く夏) (1997)
- English Demon Kingdom -- a Trip to the Hometown of Harry Potter (イギリス魔界紀行―ハリーポッターの故郷へ) (2003) (NHK Publishing)
- Shin Teito Monogatari (新帝都物語) (Kadokawa Shoten, 2007) (ISBN 978-4048737159)

=== Film ===
- The Great Yokai War: Guardians (2021)
