= Yanaka =

Yanaka may refer to:

- 22489 Yanaka (1997 GR24) is a Main-belt Asteroid discovered in 1997
- Hiroshi Yanaka (born 1958), Japanese actor and voice actor with Seinenza Theater Company
- Katsunori Yanaka (born 1971), professional Go player
- Marie Yanaka
- Yanaka, Tokyo
- Yanaka Cemetery, huge cemetery located north of Ueno in Yanaka 1-chome, Taito, Tokyo, Japan
- Yanaka Five-Storied Pagoda Double-Suicide Arson Case, the burning by arson in 1957 of a five-storied pagoda in the Yanaka Cemetery
