= Otōto =

Otōto (Japanese: Younger Brother) may refer to:

- Otōto (TV drama), a 1990 Japanese television drama
- Otōto (2010 film), a 2010 Japanese film by Yoji Yamada
- Her Brother, a 1960 Japanese film by Kon Ichikawa
