= Yanaka five-storied pagoda double-suicide arson case =

1957 event in Yanaka Cemetery, Taitō, Tokyo

Coordinates: 35.725254°N 139.770813°E

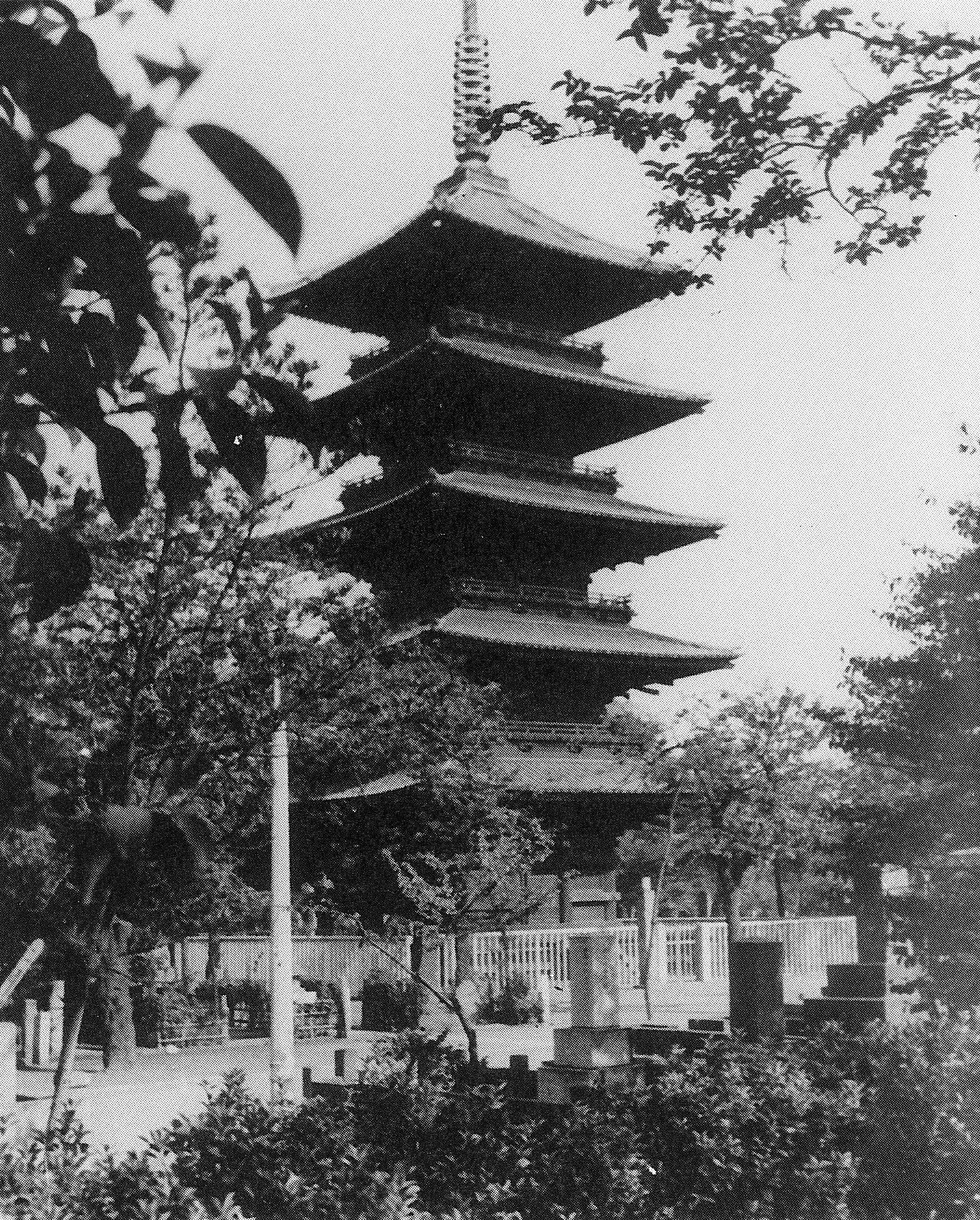
The Pagoda, circa 1930

The Yanaka five-storied pagoda double-suicide arson case (谷中五重塔放火心中事件, Yanaka Gojūnotō Hōka Shinjū Jiken) was a dramatic case of arson in 1957 of a five-storied wooden pagoda in Yanaka Cemetery, Taitō, Tokyo. The pagoda was set on fire by two lovers who committed suicide together – their bodies were found in the remains of the structure.

== Five-storied pagoda ==
Originally part of the Buddhist temple Tennō-ji, the five-storied pagoda was built in 1644. It burned down in 1771 and was rebuilt some 20 years later in 1791. This last version, built of Japanese zelkova wood was, at almost 35 meters, the tallest of its kind in the Kantō area.

In 1908, the five-storied pagoda was donated by Tennō-ji to the city of Tokyo and became the model for Kōda Rohan's novel The Five-Storied Pagoda. It was a famous city landmark and the very symbol of Yanaka Cemetery, but it was completely destroyed by fire at around 3 o'clock in the morning on July 6, 1957.

== Arson case ==
The pagoda burned to the ground on July 6, 1957. Next to the middle pillar of the pagoda, among the ruins, were found the two charred bodies of a man and a woman. The bodies were too badly burned for a positive identification to be possible, but their identities were established to a near-certainty thanks to a thimble found among the ruins.

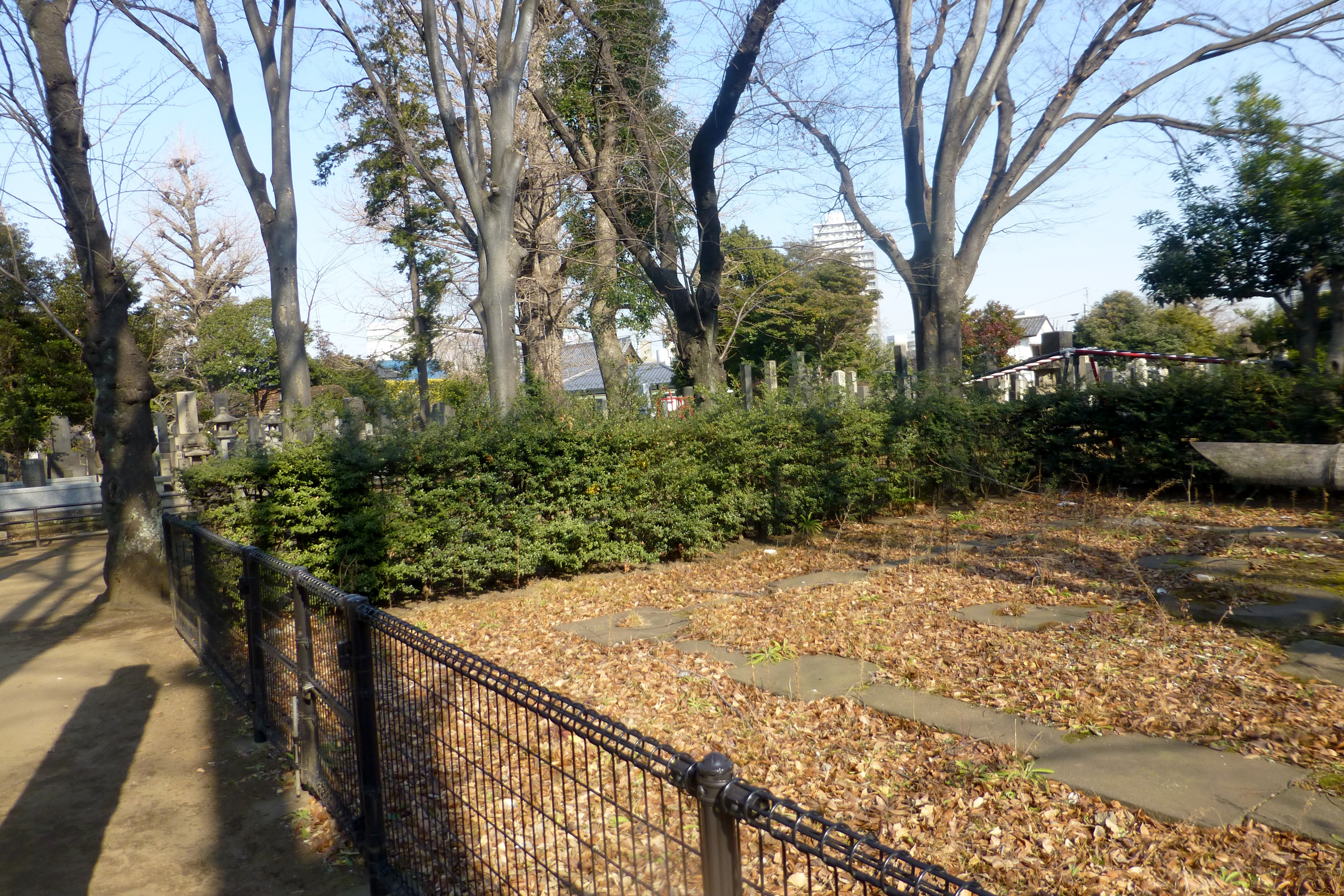
The remaining foundation stones.

A seamstress in her twenties working in a sewing shop in Tokyo and her middle-aged (and married) lover had gone missing. Witnesses testified that the two had wanted to burn themselves to atone for their adulterous relationship, and therefore the two bodies were likely to be theirs. The destruction of the cultural asset was nonetheless universally and severely criticized. It was decided that the pagoda would not be rebuilt, and that only the five foundation stones would be preserved.

In 2007, researchers at the Tokyo University of the Arts claimed to have found blueprints of the pagoda drawn in 1970, and a movement to rebuild it was born. The cost to rebuild was estimated at almost a billion yen, nonetheless it was approved by Hirayama Kunio.
