= The Five-Storied Pagoda =

- Short story by Kōda Rohan
- Country: Japan
- Language: Japanese, English
- Genre: Historical fiction

Publication
- Publication type: Newspaper
- Media type: Print (Periodical literature)

The Five-Storied Pagoda (Gojūnotō, 五重塔) is a novella by writer Kōda Rohan. “It was originally written as a serialized piece of fiction in the intellectual newspaper Kokkai (Diet, or Parliament), beginning in November 1891 and ending in March of the following year. As a consequence, chapter divisions in this story […] do not necessarily coincide with the breaks in plot progression or narrative pauses.”(15). The pagoda in the story is based on a pagoda donated to Tokyo by Tennō-ji.

== Plot Synopsis ==
Jūbei is a poor carpenter working under the master architect Genta. When the Abbot proposes the construction of a new pagoda, Jūbei insists that he take charge of the construction. The Abbot has pity on Jūbei. Genta proposes cooperation between the two, but Jūbei rejects his offer. The Abbot finally gives Jūbei full authority over the project. One of Genta's servants, Seikichi, is furious about Jūbei rejecting his master's offer which makes him lose face. Seikichi goes to the construction yard of the pagoda and attacks Jūbei in a rage, cutting off his ear and severely wounding him. Despite his injuries, Jūbei insists upon finishing the project. Eventually the pagoda is completed, but then one night a terrible storm hits Edo, endangering the pagoda. One of the servants, Eiji tricks Jūbei into coming to the site during the storm. Jūbei rushes to the roof of the pagoda and stands in defiance of the storm and waits for the storm to die out. Everyone fears the pagoda will come crashing down, but amazingly enough, it stays standing. In the coming days, the Abbot finalizes the pagoda with an inscription signifying the pagoda was built by Jūbei, and approved by Genta.

== Plot summary ==
Okichi, Genta's wife, speaks with Seikichi about Genta's rival, Jubei. Jubei is a lowly carpenter and Okichi becomes aggravated by his audacity to challenge her renowned carpenter husband for the position of building the coveted pagoda. Jubei's inability to find work troubles his wife, Onami. His peers undermine his ability by calling him “Nossori, Slowpoke”, which causes additional grief for Onami. She also worries about how Jubei's peers will view him if he continues to challenge Genta for the pagoda job because of their large gap in social status.

The Abbot Roen of Uda wants the pagoda built in order to utilize the funds left over from Genta's renovation of the Kano Temple. Although it was presumed Genta would build the pagoda, Jubei heard about the pagoda and decided to ask the Abbot if he could build it instead. When Jubei visits the Abbot, Tame’emon tries to send him away, but the Abbot welcomes Jubei inside. Jubei explains to the Abbot how he built a model of the pagoda and how much he wants to build the pagoda. After looking over Jubei's pagoda model, the Abbot agrees Jubei has the necessary skill to build the pagoda. The Abbot struggles to decide if either Genta or Jubei should build the pagoda.

The Abbot calls both Genta and Jubei to the temple and lets them know they should decide between themselves who should build the pagoda. He tells them a tale about two sons and their father. When the two sons fight, they accomplish nothing, but when they work together, they find precious sands. When the Abbot finishes, Genta and Jubei both wonder why the Abbot chose to share the tale with them. In the story, the younger son allows the older son to walk over the bridge first to the precious sands. Jubei knows he is the younger brother and the tale suggests he should let Genta go ahead and build the pagoda, but Jubei's carpenter Katagi does not allow him to give up on his dreams of building the pagoda. Genta knows the older son only found the precious sands because the younger son helped him, so Genta wants to build the pagoda with Jubei's help in order to follow the Abbot's tale. Okichi thinks Genta should not have to share the pagoda with Jubei at all, regardless of what the tale suggests.

When Genta visits Jubei to tell him he can help with the pagoda, Jubai turns Genta's offer down and says he either wants to build the pagoda by himself or not build it at all. Both Onami and Genta get angry with Jubei for being so irrational, because Jubei should eagerly accept the opportunity to work on the pagoda, even if it meant sharing half the credit with Genta. Genta leaves and goes home to drink with Seikichi and Okichi. Seikichi agrees with Okichi that Genta never should have offered to share the pagoda with Jubei and threatens Jubei for overstepping his position in society. Genta realizes he needs to remain calm about the situation to avoid any embarrassment.

Genta goes to the temple to ask the Abbot to choose who should build the pagoda because Jubei and Genta were unable to reach an agreement. The Abbot tells Genta that Jubei came earlier and said the same thing. The Abbot encourages Genta to show compassion towards Jubei.

Ino, Jubei's son, tells Onami he had a nightmare where someone bashed Jubei's head open. Onami worries the dream may hold some deeper meaning. Meanwhile, Jubei gets summoned to the temple and Endo lets Jubei know he's the chosen one to build the pagoda. Genta invites Jubei to a place in the pleasure quarters to congratulate him and discuss how they should move forward with the building of the pagoda. Genta apologizes for getting angry before and expresses how he wants to help Jubei. When Genta tries to give Jubei the work he did on the pagoda so far, Jubei refuses to it. Genta gets angry and tells Jubei he will be waiting for him to mess up. Genta leaves Jubei behind in frustration to meet up with his friends to drink and have a good time.

Jubei, as promised, pours his heart into building the pagoda, creating an atmosphere of productivity. In contrast to the bright mood at the pagoda site, Genta's home has turned into a site of gloom with Okichi brooding over Genta not getting the pagoda job. Okichi questions Seikchi's loyalty to Genta, so Seikichi sets out to prove himself. Seikichi goes to the pagoda site and attacks Jubei with an adze, cutting his left ear off. Eiji stops Seikichi from doing any more harm to Jubei. Eiji goes to Genta's home only to realize Genta already left to go to Jubei's home to apologize for Seikichi's actions. Eiji tells Okichi about what happened to Jubei.

Genta visits both Jubei and the Abbot to apologize for Seikichi's actions. Seikichi's mom deeply apologizes to Genta for Seikichi because she knows her son has a good heart but he let his anger get the best of him, which is why she thinks he did what he did. Genta feels sorry for Seikichi's mother and does not know how to respond to her. Okichi, on the other hand, knows Seikichi only attacked Jubei because of his respect for Genta and because of her persuasion. She feels responsible and takes care of Seikichi behind Genta's back. Seikichi feels remorse for his actions because he realizes how much trouble he caused Genta.

The day after the accident, Jubei gets ready to go to work. Onami tries to stop him but Jubei insists on going to work because he does not want his workers to view him as weak. With hard work and determination, Jubei finishes building the pagoda. Everyone marvels at Jubei's pagoda and it gets the high praise of “Deva King”.

Out of nowhere, a huge storm comes to challenge the pagoda, led by the Demon King. The storm warns against giving praise to man-made objects and proceeds to wreck everything in sight. Everyone in Edo is terrified of the storm, especially Tame’emon and Endo. They express concern over the pagoda's ability to withhold the storm and bribe Shichizo to bring Jubei to the pagoda to check on it. Jubei refuses to go to the pagoda unless the Abbot summons him there, so Shichizo lies and tells Jubei the Abbot did summon him in order to get Jubei to go. Jubei takes this as a direct insult to his carpenter katagi and rushes over to the pagoda, prepared to kill himself if he finds any error with his pagoda. Genta also monitors the pagoda, waiting to see if it would make it through the storm.

When the pagoda survives the storm unscathed, everyone continues their adulation for the pagoda and for Jubei's craftsmanship. The Abbot inscribes the pagoda with both Jubei and Genta's name, and since that day, the pagoda and its legend has continued to live on.

== Setting ==
The story is set in the Edo period and takes place at a number of locations:

Temple
Kannō Temple is a key setting in the story. This is where the Abbot resides, the announcement of who will build the pagoda is given, and where the pagoda will be built. Most of the temple was renovated by Genta; who was expected to build the pagoda there as well. However, this task was left to Jūbei who poured his heart and soul into it. His pagoda was then tested against a storm of epic proportions which assaulted the temple grounds. During the storm, Genta stormed around scrutinizing everything, waiting for something to fail, while Jūbei waited at the top of the pagoda; hoping that it would survive.

Genta's House
The place where Genta and Okichi interact. It is a necessary setting to display the Katagi of the wife since, as the wife, she should not leave the house. This is also where Seikichi all but lives, and is where Okichi nudges Seikichi to avenge Genta; leading him to attack Jūbei.

Jubei's House
Also acts as a way to display the Katagi of the wife; it is the only time we see interactions with Onami. Here Jūbei's obsession about the pagoda is revealed, where he spends countless, sleepless nights perfecting his model. His son then builds his own version of his father's pagoda and predicts the attack on his father in a dream. An important fight between Jūbei and Genta takes place here, in which Jūbei refuses his master's offer to share the pagoda project.

Upstairs Room of Hokai Restaurant
Another important fight between Genta and Jūbei takes place here that illustrates Jūbei's craftsmen Katagi. This time Jūbei refuses to use Genta's estimates and ideas stating that if he is going to build the pagoda, he is not going to receive any help. It is either he builds it completely himself, or not at all.

== Characters ==
=== Main characters ===
Jūbei (Nossori)
A lowly, tactless and obscure carpenter, given the nickname “Nossori, Slowpoke by his colleagues” (27). He aspires to build the five-storied pagoda even though it goes against the wishes of his master, his wife and his collogues. When the Abott lets Jūbei and Genta decide who builds the pagoda, he experiences an internal struggle because although he cannot think of another purpose for his life other than building that pagoda, he is going against Genta, his master and the man to whom he is eternally indebted. He demonstrates the craftsman Katagi quite strongly when he refuses to work on the project with Genta and insists on building the pagoda alone, and, when he is injured after being attacked by Seikichi, he insists on going to the construction site the next day despite Onami's protest. That action gains him the workers respect and speeds up the building of the pagoda. His obsession with building the pagoda to perfection alone is another sign that illustrates the craftsman Katagi. The introduction of Pagoda, Skull and Samurai describes him as someone who is “often lauded as a champion of modern individualism for refusing all compromises, or a ruthless social climber. But the crucial keys to his character are the nature of a pagoda and the religious implications of pagoda constructions. In Buddhist scriptures, especially the Lotus Sutra (virtually the sore devotional object in the Nichiren sect), the pagoda, or stupa, is identified with a variety of religious concepts: Buddha’s body; testimony to the truth of the Lotus teachings; the universe itself, in which the ancient Buddha (the symbolic moon) and the present Buddha (the sun) dwell side by side; and the Western Pure Land (whence the ancient Buddha returns to save mankind and whither the present Buddha will lead it). The construction of a pagoda is deemed equal to the preaching of the Lotus gospel in its ultimate religious merit.” (Pagoda, Skull and Samurai: Three Stories by Kōda Rohan, 16)

Genta of Kawagoe
The strict master carpenter possessing both skill and status. Both in his mien and his looks, he is a man of masculine charm who inspires anyone's admiration (41). He rebuilt the Kanno temple and did such an impressive job that he was considered for the building pagoda. He admires Jūbei's dedication and skill, and after hearing the story from the Abott he suggests they work on the pagoda together as chief and assistant, and upon Jūbei's refusal Genta offers to take the role of the assistant himself. Genta's suggestion stems from the fact that he is an Edoite scrupulous in performing his social obligations yet susceptible to sentiment, and is as unbending in his principles as he is unsparing in his kindness (57). After meeting with the Abbot a second time, he agrees to let Jūbei build the pagoda. When Jūbei refuses to use Genta's estimates and plans for the pagoda, the latter vows to be watchful of the pagoda so as to punish Jūbei if a single nail falls out, and literally circles the pagoda during the storm, waiting for that to happen. His sense of honor plays a major role in the decision he makes, which plays up his honorable man Katagi. He gives up the pagoda project for no reason other than honor.

Abbot Rōen of Uda
“A priest so esteemed that at the mere mention of his name even a three-year-old would fold his palms in veneration. In his youth he pursued rigorous training and religious studies at Mt. Minobu, the headquarters of Nichiren Buddhism, and in his middle years he traveled throughout sixty provinces as a mendicant practicing austerity and asceticism. He had sharpened the sword of tranquil wisdom through contemplation of Samsara, this world, and Dharma, the Law. He intoned the sacred gospel of salvation in four dialects of Sanskrit. Now a septuagenarian, the Abott was as lean as a crane, the result of abstinence from unclean food –meat, fish, and ill-smelling vegetables. His eyes were always half closed so that he might transcend the turmoil of the human sphere. Having learned the Principle of Emptiness, he no longer kindled the flames of desire in his heart. Having comprehended the truth of Nirvna, he was free from the taint of worldly attachment” (Pagoda, Skull and Samurai 29). The Abbot views Jūbei through the lens of compassion and sees in him the good that everyone else overlooks because of his low status. He agrees to meet with Jūbei after his servants attempt to throw the carpenter out, and takes pity on him when he begs for the pagoda contract, and admires his skill after he sees the model he built.

=== Supporting characters ===
Okichi
Genta's wife. She is described as someone who does not give any thought to her appearance, but rather as if she took pride in her respectability (22). She believes strongly in her husband and feels contempt for Jūbei for daring to compete with her husband, his master, despite his low status. She is tactfully amiable even to a subordinate like Seikichi (23). Despite being stubborn herself, she adapts to her husband's temper. She fits the wife Katagi because although she cares a great deal for her husband, she fails to understand how his world works. She also spends a great deal of time thinking and working from behind the scenes, like the time when she encourages Seikichi to avenge Genta's honor (although not realizing how reckless he will be), and helps him escape Edo by selling some of her precious possessions.

Onami
Jūbei's wretched-looking wife. “Although her features that are not homely, her skin is pitifully dry and rough from malnutrition” (28). She pities her husband for being untutored in the ways of the world despite his skill at carpentry and wishes his wits would be half as sharp as his trading skills (27). She refers to Genta and Okichi as the Master and Madam, and worries about their reaction to her husband's unreasonable aspiration. She demonstrates the wife Katagi by constantly worrying about her husband's wellbeing. She also provides a reflective narrative unobtainable through Jūbei, who as a man does not waste time thinking.

Seikichi
Genta's foolish young subordinate. Lives with his mother and takes care of her and loathes Jūbei for daring to go against his boss. He spends time with Genta and his wife, drinking and chatting. He owes a great deal to Genta, who once saved him from fleeing Edo after injuring a colleague of his by paying for the colleague's treatment and telling Seikichi to apologize to him, which made Seikichi and the colleague best friends. His young age and lack of experience are revealed when his faithfulness to Genta drives him to act irresponsibly and attack Jūbei. He injures him and slices his ear off, and attempts to do more before Eiji stops him and knocks him out. That act of aggression causes him to flee Edo.

=== Other characters ===
Ino
Jūbei's son. While his dad is at the Temple to speak to the Abbot, Ino piles scraps of lumber in imitation of a five-storied pagoda, which earns him a tearful embrace from his distressed mother and a tear-muffled laughter from his father. A dream he has about his father's head being split open with a shovel foreshadows the incident where Seikichi attacks Jūbei.

Seikichi's mother
An old woman who lives with her son. Apologizes to Genta for her son's action.

Endō
An announcer at the temple that lets Jūbei know whether or not he was awarded the pagoda contract.

Tame’emon
A receptionist at the temple. Attempts to throw Jūbei out when the latter attempts to speak with the Abbot.

Den
A geisha at the brothel located in an upstairs room of Horai Restaurant.

Shichizo
Is sent to fetch Jūbei during the storm by Endō and Tame’emon who tell him to lie and say that the Abbot wants Jūbei near a pagoda, a lie which causes Jūbei to believe the Abbot has lost all faith in his ability and makes him wish death upon himself.

Eiji
The short-tempered chief of the M crew and a contact of Genta who helps Jūbei build the pagoda(73). Nicknamed the Master Fireball.

King Demon
A personification of the wrath of Nature.

== Themes ==
Katagi
Refers to a specific type of person, likened to a “mold” that people fit. Everyone within these Katagi performs their assigned roles to the best of their ability.

Carpenter Katagi - Striving to be the perfect carpenter. Jubei shows his extreme carpenter Katagi when he goes to work the day after his ear gets chopped off. His desire to work and prove himself to his workers trumped the pain and necessary recovery he needed after the accident. He strives to build the pagoda perfectly, scrutinizing over every detail to ensure its strength and durability.

Honor Katagi - Placing honor above everything else. Genta displays characteristics of this Katagi because honor is what motivates many of his decisions, and the reason he gives up the pagoda project.

Subordinate Katagi - loyalty to the master to the point of committing reckless acts. Seikichi demonstrates this Katagi when he attacks Jubei in an attempt to protect his master's honor.

Wifely Katagi – Striving to be the perfect wife. Worrying and fretting over Genta, always thinking of his best interests, Genta's wife, Okichi, riles up Seikichi thinking he will avenge Genta's honor in some way. She knows he deserved to build the pagoda and she thinks Jubei should be punished for taking the job from her husband.

Personifications
In The Five-Storied Pagoda, there is a theme of deity comparison. Genta tells Jubei that Eiji has the ability to build something sturdier than “the deity Fudo’s pedestal” [pg 73]. Genta also talks about “fireball” spirit, which comes up again later when Eiji protects Jubei from Seikichi. The Abbot is considered a “King Lion or King Peacock” because of how much higher he stands in status compared to others in his field [pg 97]. When Jubei finishes the pagoda, it is considered a “Deva King” because of its tall stature and stability [pg 97].

Homo-social Society
Male relationships dominate in The Five-Storied Pagoda. Although the wives show concern for their husbands out of wifely katagi, the men never listen and always do what they think is best. The story also focuses on power relations within the male society, instead of a female-male setting.

Social Class
The large gap in social class between Jubei and Genta creates constant animosity in The Five-Storied Pagoda. Okichi's anger towards Jubei comes from his receiving the pagoda job over Genta, even though Jubei is underneath Genta in social recognition in their field. Onami tries to dissuade Jubei from taking the pagoda job because she knows Genta's higher social rank means he should receive the job over Jubei.

== Adaptations ==
There are currently three adaptations for the Five-Storied Pagoda : two movies and a drama. Both movies are titled Goju No To with one produced in 1944 (directed by Heinosuke Gosho) and the other produced in 2007 (directed by Masatoshi Akihara). There haven’t been very many (if any) reviews for any of the movies yet. Nor do the web sites for the movies give any sort of summary or introduction. See the links below for more information on the movies. The drama has far more information on it than the movies. Released in 2009, it was directed by Atsushi Funahashi and is widely popular among critics. It was chosen as BEST 10 in the 2010 issue of FILM COMMENT. Here is a synopsis from the website: Deep in the Valley interlaces a story of young romance set in Yanaka (part of old downtown Tokyo) with a Japanese period drama based on Five-Story Pagoda, a classic literary work by Rohan Kōda. In the contemporary story, Kaori, a young woman working for a non-profit organization that restores home movies, learns that there used to be a five-story pagoda in the middle of Yanaka Cemetery. It burned down in 1957, and rumor has it that someone has an 8mm film of the fire. Kaori visits Buddhist monks, a cemetery caretaker, a local historian, and traditional craftsmen in her search for the film. She falls in love with Hisaki, a local street punk, and together they discover the mysteries of the lost pagoda. In a story set in the Edo period (18th century), Jūbei, a young, obscure carpenter, aspires to build the Five-Story Pagoda alone despite the opposition of his boss, his colleagues, and his wife. Mixing fiction and documentary, the film breaks the barrier dividing generations and fills the void of lost memories.
