= Katsunori =

- Gender: Male

Origin
- Origin: Japanese
- Meaning: Different meanings depending on the kanji used

Katsunori (written: 勝紀, 克紀, 克典, 克則 or 克法) is a masculine Japanese given name. Notable people with the name include:

- Katsunori Kikuno (菊野 克紀; born 1981), Japanese mixed martial artist
- Kotoōshū Katsunori (琴欧洲 勝紀; born 1983), Bulgarian sumo wrestler
- Katsunori Kuwabara (桑原 克典; born 1969), Japanese golfer
- Katsunori Nomura (野村 克則; born 1973), Japanese baseball player
- Katsunori Takahashi (高橋 克典; born 1964), Japanese singer and actor
- Katsunori Ueebisu (上夷 克典; born 1996), Japanese footballer
- Katsunori Wakabayashi (若林 克法), Japanese physicist
- Katsunori Yanaka (矢中 克典; born 1971), Japanese Go player
