= Tennō-ji (Taitō) =

Tennō-ji 天王寺
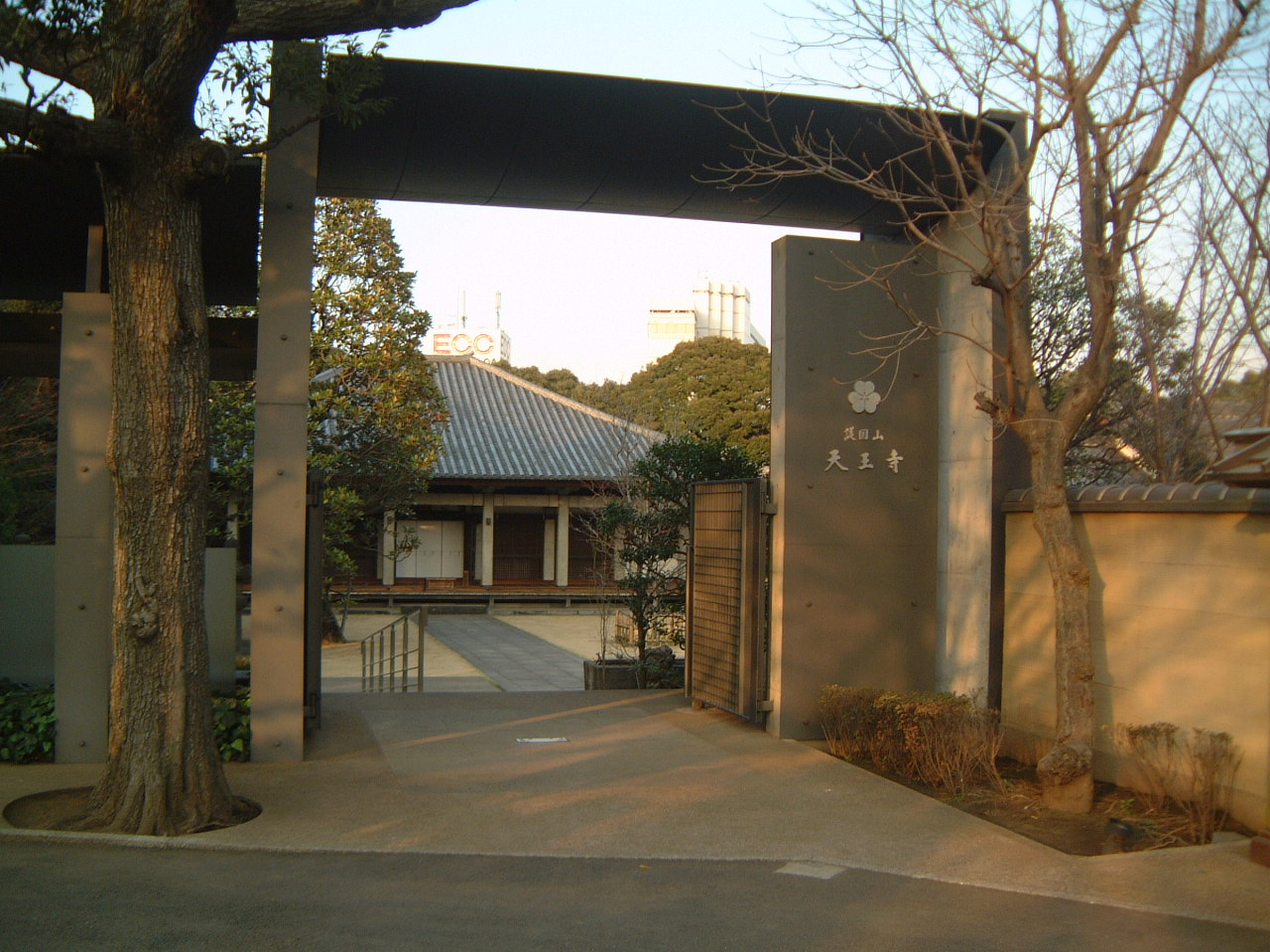
- sōmon (general gate)

Religion
- Affiliation: Tendai
- Deity: Amitābha

Location
- Location: Yanaka 7-14-8, Taitō, Tokyo
- Country: Japan
- Interactive map of Tennō-ji 天王寺
- Coordinates: 35.7267°N 139.7713°E

Architecture
- Founder: Nichigen
- Completed: 1274

Website
- http://www.tendaitokyo.jp

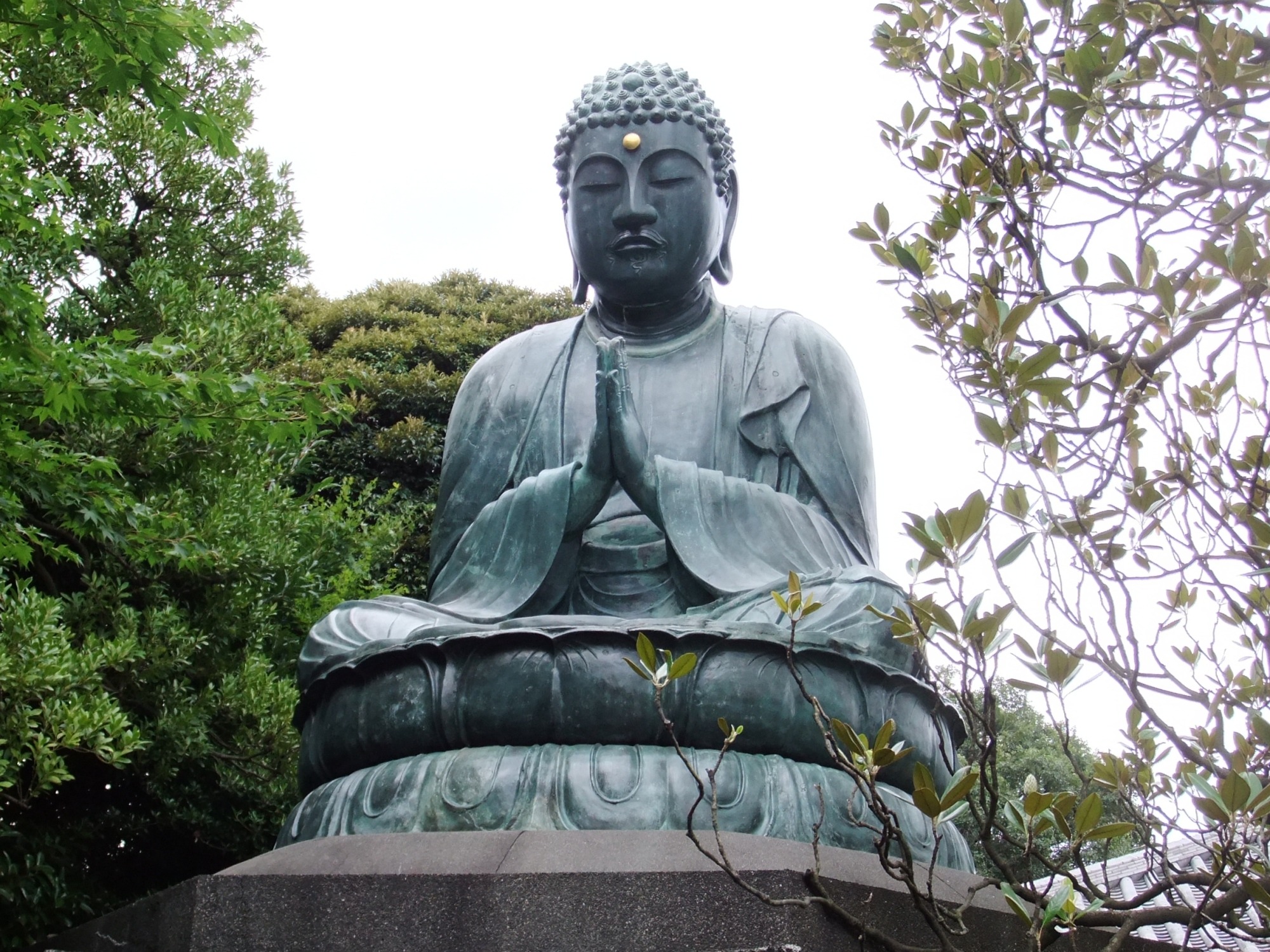

Tennō-ji (天王寺) is a Tendai Buddhist temple of Japan, located in Yanaka, Taitō, Tokyo.

The temple was erected by Nichigen (日源) in 1274.

== See also ==
- Yanaka Cemetery
