= Yanesen =

Coordinates: 35.727846°N 139.764789°E

Yanesen (谷根千) is a district in Tokyo, which has many historical structures, in the style of Edo-period Tokyo. It is known for its traditional style and antiquated temple district-style.

The three neighbourhoods, Yanaka (谷中), Nezu (根津) and Sendagi (千駄木) are collectively called Yanesen combining the first character of each.
