= Encounter with a Skull =

- Short story by Koda Rohan
- Language: Japanese
- Genres: Historical fiction, Supernatural fiction

Publication
- Publication date: 1890
- Publication place: Japan
- Media type: Print (Periodical)

"Encounter with a Skull" is a short story by Japanese author Koda Rohan.

== Plot summary ==
The story is told from the perspective of a fictional version of the author with the pen name "Rohan". During his journey to Tokyo, young Rohan enters a small town. He is told he must cross through the mountain to reach his next destination. Rohan makes the trek. Freezing and exhausted, he chances upon a small hut nestled away in the environment. A strange young woman offers him shelter and nurses him back to health. Taken with this strange woman, Rohan inquires as to how she came to this unfortunate circumstance out so far away from civilisation. The woman relates to him her story of how she became a hermit. After the tale, the house vanishes and Rohan is left out in the snow alone. Next to him is a skull in place of the young woman. Rohan finally finishes his trek through the mountain and enters into the next village. He inquires about the hermit woman he encountered. A towns person tells him that the woman was originally a hideous, insane old beggar who, rejected from society, fled into the mountains and was never heard from again.
