= Nobu Kōda =

Japanese musician (1870–1946)

Nobu Koda
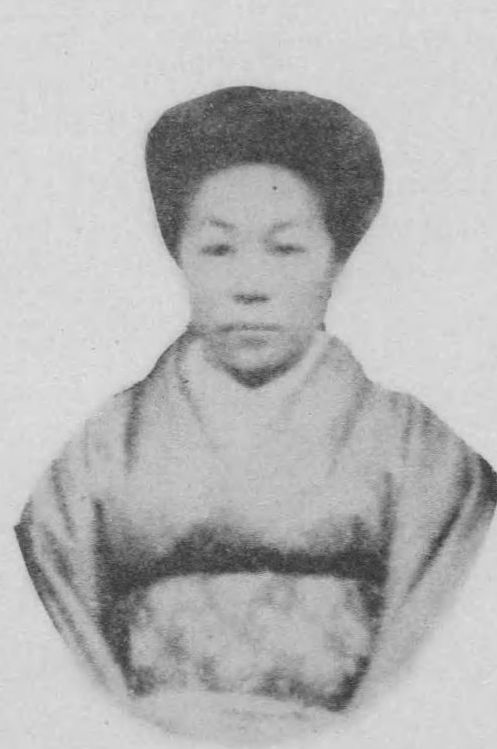
- Born: 19 April 1870; Tokyo, Japan
- Died: 19 March 1946 (aged 75); Tokyo, Japan
- Occupations: pianist, violinist, composer
- Relatives: brother: Rohan Koda (author), sister: Kou Ando (violinist)

Nobu Kōda 幸田延 (1870–1946) was a Japanese composer, violinist, and music teacher. She was one of the first Japanese women to study music overseas. She studied at the New England Conservatory. She later studied in Europe. She was the sister of Kōda Rohan.

== Early life ==
Nobu Kōda was born on 19 April 1870. Both her and her sister Andō Kōko studied at the Tokyo Music School (now known as Tokyo University of the Arts). As a child she studied the koto and studied western music with Nakamura Sen. She graduated from the Institute in 1885 as part of the first graduating class.

== Education ==
Kōda's studies abroad allowed her to become an authority on western music up on her return to Japan.

She went to Boston and studied at the New England Conservatory in 1889 at the age of 19, becoming one of the first Japanese women to study abroad. She then returned to Japan for a short time before going to Europe. She studied piano, violin, singing and music composition in Vienna through 1895 before returning once again to Japan.

In 1892 she went to Germany and studied there with Joseph Joachim.

Nobu Kōda would leave for Europe again in 1909, though would once again return to Japan, where she lived until her death in 1946.

== Career ==
She became a professor at the Tokyo Music School in 1895.

After returning to Japan, she founded a private music school from her home, giving piano lessons to upper class girls and members of the royal family.

She was also a concert artist, premiering several Western works in Japan including Mendelssohn's Violin Concerto, Concerto for Two Violins by J.S. Bach, and Beethoven String Quartets.

== Impact and works ==
Nobu Koda was considered an authority on western music in Japan, and was the first Japanese composer to write a violin sonata.

Both Nobu Koda and her sister taught Shinichi Suzuki. She encouraged him to study abroad in Germany, where he would deepen his knowledge of violin and pedagogy and eventually develop the famous Suzuki Teaching Method. As a professor at the Tokyo Music School, she taught pianist and composer Rentarō Taki, opera singer Miura Tamaki, and composer and conductor Kosaku Yamada.

Her brother Rohan Koda was one of the most highly respected authors of the time. His daughter Aya, granddaughter Tama, and great-granddaughter Nao were all award-winning authors. They all wrote personal accounts of their family's history & often mentioned Nobu, preventing her from falling into obscurity.
