= Nichigen =

Buddhist monk of the Kamakura period

- 日源
- Title: 阿闍梨 (Acharya)

Personal life
- Born: Sometime before 1263
- Died: 1315

Religious life
- Religion: Buddhism
- Temple: Jisso-ji
- School: Nichiren Buddhism
- Sect: Nichiren-shū
- Monastic name: 豊前公 (Buzen-kō)

Senior posting
- Teacher: Nichiren

Buzen Nichigen (豊前日源, before 1263 – 1315) was a disciple of Nichiren who converted along with the rest of the Tendai temple Jisso-ji (實相寺) to Nichiren Buddhism in 1270. Nichiren's letter Jissoji gosho (實相寺御書, 1278) is addressed to him. Later, he joined Nichiren on Mount Minobu, and founded several temples after Nichiren's death.
