= Kōda Rohan =

Japanese writer

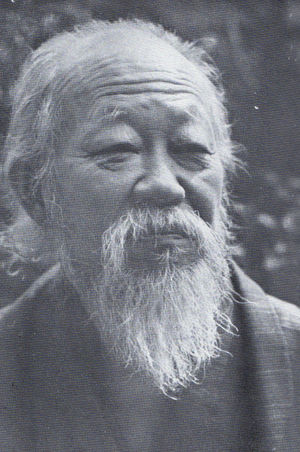
- Born: Kōda Shigeyuki; 23 July 1867; Tokyo, Japan
- Died: 30 July 1947 (aged 80); Tokyo, Japan
- Other name: 幸田 露伴、幸田 成行
- Occupation: author
- Family: Nobu Kōda (sister), Kou Ando (sister)

Kōda Shigeyuki (幸田 成行; 23 July 1867 – 30 July 1947), pen name Kōda Rohan (幸田 露伴; Japanese pronunciation: [koː.da (|) ɾoꜜ.haɴ]), was a Japanese author. His daughter, Aya Kōda, was also a noted author who often wrote about him.

Kōda wrote "The Icon of Liberty", also known as "The Buddha of Art" or "The Elegant Buddha", in 1889. A house in which Kōda lived, Kagyū-an (蝸牛庵; snail cottage), was rebuilt in 1972 by the Meiji Mura museum. Kōda was one of the first persons to be awarded the Order of Culture when it was established in 1937.

== Early life ==
Rohan was born in the Kanda District of Tokyo. He went to Hibiya High School and Aoyama Gakuin, but he did not graduate from both schools. He was the son of Kōda Shigenobu (1839?–1914) and Kōda Yu (1842?–1919), whose father was Kōda Ritei, a samurai official serving under the local daimyō. Rohan's childhood name was Tetsushirō Shigeyuki, "shirō" implying the fourth son.

== Notable short stories ==
- "Dewdrops" (1889)
- "Love Bodhisattva" (1889)
- "Encounter with a Skull" (1890)
- "A Sealed Letter" (1890)
- "The Five-Storied Pagoda" (1891) (translated into English as The Pagoda)
- "The Bearded Samurai"

== Poems ==
- Leaving the Hermitage (1905)

== Novels ==
- The Whaler (1891)
- The Minute Storehouse of Life (unfinished)

== In fiction ==
- The 1960 Kon Ichikawa film Her Brother is adapted from an autobiographical work by Aya Koda. Consequently, the character of "Father" (played by Masayuki Mori) is based on Kōda Rohan.
- Kōda Rohan, along with many other historical figures from the Meiji Restoration, is a protagonist of the 1985 award-winning historical fantasy novel Teito Monogatari by Aramata Hiroshi. In the first film adaptation of the novel, he was played by veteran actor Kōji Takahashi. In the animated adaptation he was voiced by Yūsaku Yara.

== See also ==
- Japanese literature
- List of Japanese authors
