= Aya Kōda =

Japanese writer

- 幸田文
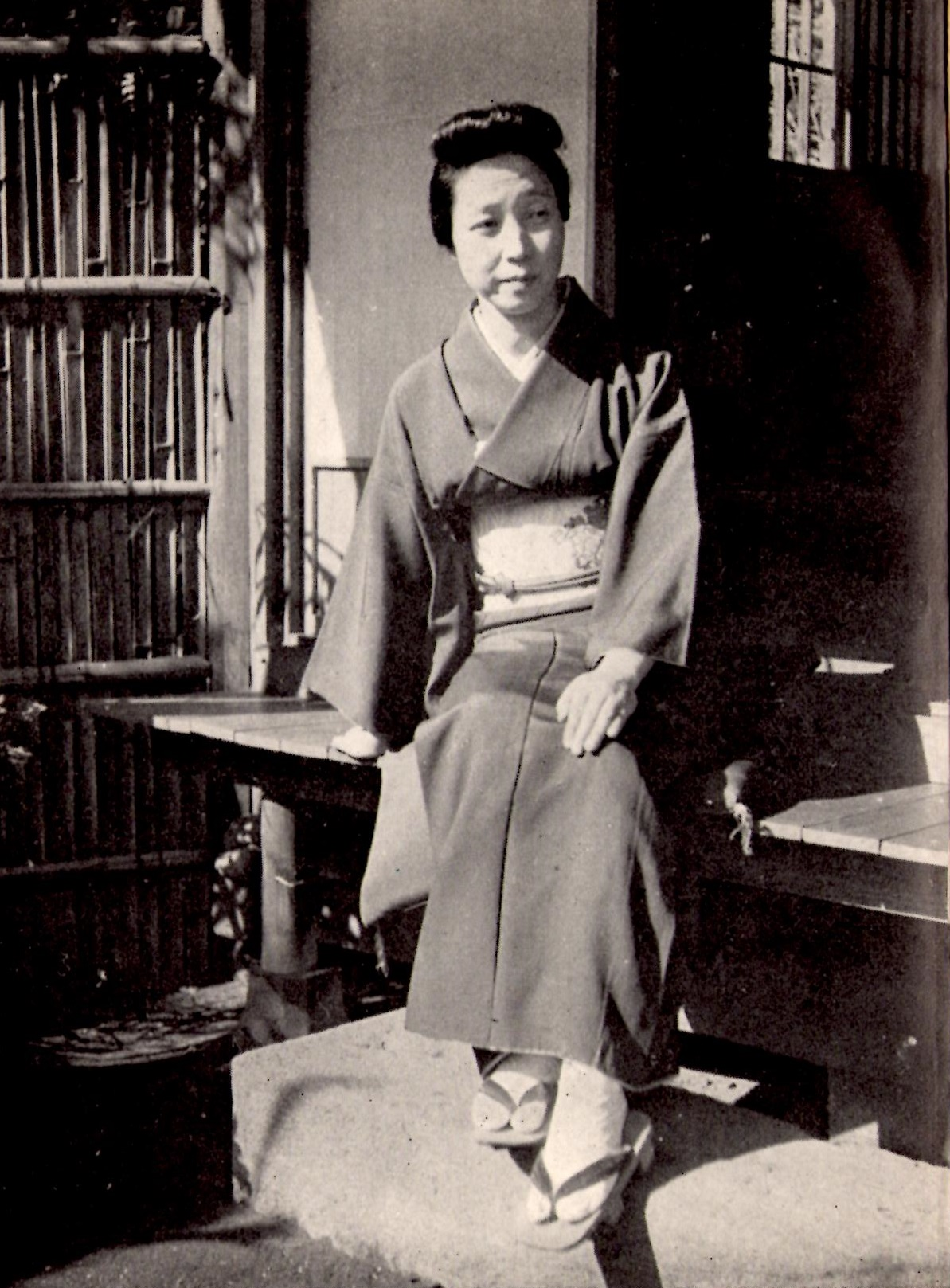
- Aya Kōda in 1950
- Born: 1 September 1904; Terajima, Minami Katsushika-gun, Tokyo, Japan
- Died: 31 October 1990 (aged 86); Tokyo, Japan
- Occupation: Writer
- Spouses: Ikunosuke Mitsuhashi; (m. 1928–1938)
- Family: Rohan Kōda (father); Tama Aoki (daughter); Nao Aoki (granddaughter)

Aya Kōda (幸田文, Kōda Aya; 1 September 1904 – 31 October 1990) was a Japanese writer of novels, short stories and essays. She was the daughter of writer Rohan Kōda. Among her most noted works is the 1955 novel Nagareru.

== Biography ==
Kōda was born in Terajima, Minami Katsushika-gun, Tokyo, as the second child of Rohan Kōda and his wife Kimiko. At the age of five, she lost her mother, the following year her older sister and still later her younger brother. The relationship with her stepmother Yayoko, a well-read woman, poet, and a devout Christian, but suffering from rheumatism and unable to run a household, proved to be difficult. After failing the entrance exams for the Tokyo Women’s Higher Normal School, she entered the Joshigakuin, a Christian high school for girls, and graduated in 1922. She married the son of a sake wholesaler at age 24, but divorced after 10 years and returned with her daughter, Tama, to live with her father. The following years, overshadowed by World War II, she ran the household of her ailing father until his death in 1947 (her stepmother, who had lived apart from her husband, had died two years earlier).

Kōda's first works, written at the request of publishers when she was 43, were memoirs of life with her famous father; they include Chichi: sono shi (lit. "Death of my father") and Zakki (lit. "Random notes"). Meeting with critical acclaim and ongoing publishers' requests, she continued with works such as Misokkasu (lit. "Miso dregs") and Kusa no hana (lit. "Flowers in the grass"), accounts of her childhood and adolescent years. A recurring theme was her own feeling of inferiority, caused not only by her demanding father, but also by measuring herself against her seemingly preferred sister and her two aunts, both musicians who studied abroad.

Kōda's subsequent short stories, novels, and essays explored women's lives, family relations, and traditional culture. Her fiction was often being read as autobiographical (jidenteki shōsetsu), and many of her stories dissolved the boundary between essay and fictitious writing. In the short story The Medal, the first person female narrator chronicles the attention her father Rohan receives after being awarded the first Medal of Cultural Merit, with herself doing labourer's work for the sake shop which she runs with her husband. Nagareru (lit. "Flowing"), the account of a housemaid who works in a geisha house, used Kōda's experiences as a maid in a Yanagibashi district geisha house in the early 1950s, while the troubled youth in Otōto (lit. "Little brother") was based on her younger brother Ichirō. In addition to her literary work, she edited collections of her father's essays and letters.

In 1976, Kōda was chosen as member of the Japan Art Academy. She spent much of her later years trying to raise funds for the restoration of the pagoda of the Hōrin-ji temple, and writing essays on the subject of trees and landslides. She died of heart failure in 1990. Her daughter Tama Aoki (b. 1929), whose books include Koishikawa no ie (lit. "The house in Koishikawa") about the time living with her grandfather Rohan, and her granddaughter Nao Aoki (b. 1963) are also writers.

== Selected works ==
The year refers to the earliest publication date.

- 1947: Shūen (終焉)
- 1947: Sōsō no ki (葬送の記)
- 1947: Zakki (雑記)
- 1948: Fragments (欠片, Kakera)
- 1949: Chichi: sono shi (父 その死)
- 1949: The Medal (勲章, Kunshō)
- 1949: Misokkasu (みそっかす)
- 1950: Konna koto (こんなこと)
- 1951: Kusa no hana (草の花)
- 1951: Hair (髪, Kami)
- 1954: The Black Kimono a.k.a. The Black Hems (黒い裾, Kuroi Suso)
- 1955: Nagareru (流れる)
- 1955: Dolls a.k.a. Dolls for a Special Day (雛, Hina)
- 1956: Otōto (おとうと)
- 1965: Tō (闘)
- 1966: A Friend for Life (Mono iwanu issho no tomo)

== Awards ==
- 1956: Yomiuri Prize for The Black Kimono
- 1956: Shinchō Literary Prize for Nagareru
- 1957: Japan Art Academy Prize for Nagareru
- 1973: Joryū Bungaku Shū Literary Prize for Tō

== Legacy ==
Kōda's novels Nagareru and Otōto have repeatedly been adapted for film, stage and television, including the films Flowing by Mikio Naruse in 1956 and Her Brother by Kon Ichikawa in 1960.

Kōda has a young girl character named after her in the manga Bungo Stray Dogs, whose life partially resembles Kōda's own.

In Wim Wenders’ 2023 film Perfect Days, the main character Hiroyama buys a work of hers at a second-hand bookshop. The bookseller says “Kōda Aya deserves more recognition. She uses the same words as we do, yet there is something so special”.

== Translated works ==
- Koda, Aya (1970). "The Black Kimono". Modern Japanese Short Stories. Translated by Seidensticker, E.G. Japan Publications.
- Koda, Aya (1993). "The Medal, Hair, The Black Hems, Dolls". The Writings of Kōda Aya, a Japanese Literary Daughter. Translated by Tansman, Alan M. Yale University Press. ISBN 9780300057249.
- Koda, Aya (1999). "Fragments, The Medal, Dolls for a Special Day, A Friend for Life". Mirror: The Fiction and Essays of Kōda Aya. Translated by Sherif, Ann. University of Hawai'i Press. ISBN 9780824821814.
- Koda, Aya (2014). "Kitchen, Raindrops, A Memento of the Season". The Columbia anthology of Japanese essays : Zuihitsu from the Tenth to the Twenty-first Century. Translated by Carter, Steven D. Columbia University Press. ISBN 9780231167710.
- Koda, Aya (2026). Tree. Translated by Goff, Charlotte. Penguin Random House UK. ISBN 9780241735510.
