= Yanaka Cemetery =

Cemetery

- 谷中霊園
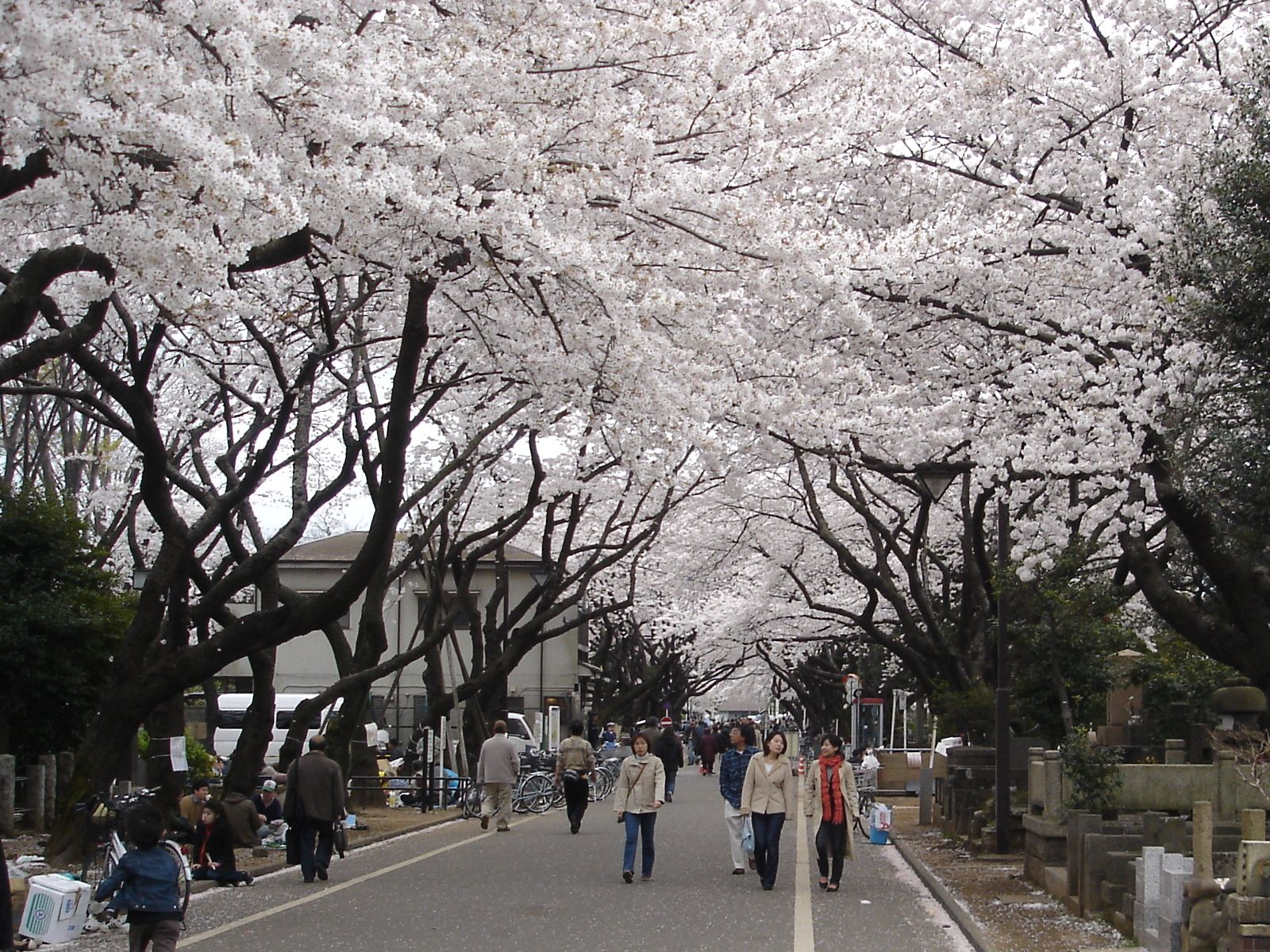
- Cherry blossoms at Yanaka Cemetery, with the Police Station at left.
- Interactive map of Yanaka Cemetery

Details
- Established: 1872
- Location: Taito, Tokyo
- Country: Japan
- Coordinates: 35°43′31″N 139°46′14″E
- Type: Public
- Style: Secular
- Size: 10 hectares (25 acres)
- No. of graves: 7,000
- Website: www.tokyo-park.or.jp/reien/park/index073.html

Yanaka Cemetery (谷中霊園, Yanaka Reien) is a large cemetery located north of Ueno in Yanaka 7-chome, Taito, Tokyo, Japan. The Yanaka sector of Taito is one of the few Tokyo neighborhoods in which the old Shitamachi atmosphere can still be felt. The cemetery is famous for its beautiful cherry blossoms in April that completely cover its paths, and for that reason that its central street is often called Cherry-blossom Avenue. Covering an area of 102,537 square meters, the site contains approximately 7,000 graves.

== Description ==
Although renamed over 85 years ago, the cemetery is still often called by its old official name, Yanaka Bochi (谷中墓地, Yanaka Graveyard), and not Yanaka Reien. It has an area of over 100 thousand square meters and hosts about 7 thousand graves. The cemetery has its own police station and a small walled enclosure dedicated to the Tokugawa clan, family of the 15 Tokugawa shōguns of Japan, which however is closed to the public and must be peeked at through double barred gates. The last shōgun Tokugawa Yoshinobu, also known as Keiki, rests here.

The cemetery used to be part of a Buddhist temple called Tennō-ji (天王寺), and its central street used to be the road (sandō) approaching it. At about the middle point of the central street are the ruins of the five-storied pagoda that became the model for Kōda Rohan's novel The Five-Storied Pagoda. The pagoda had been a donation made in 1908 by Tenno-ji itself. The five-storied pagoda was burned one summer night in 1957 in the Yanaka Five-Storied Pagoda Double-Suicide Arson Case and was later declared a historical landmark by the city authorities.

== History ==
After the Meiji Restoration, the government pursued a policy of separation of Buddhism and Shinto (Shinbutsu bunri), and Shinto funerals became more common. This posed however a problem because until then most cemeteries had been property of Buddhist temples. The solution adopted was the opening of public burial grounds. In 1872, Meiji authorities confiscated a portion of Tennō-ji and declared it a public Tokyo cemetery, the largest in the country at the time. In 1935 the name was changed from Yanaka Bochi to the present (Yanaka Reien).

== Notable burials ==
- Arisaka Nariakira
- Baba Tatsui
- Ichirō Hatoyama
- Ichiyo Higuchi
- Momoko Kochi
- Oden Takahashi
- Shibusawa Eiichi
- Murata Tsuneyoshi
- Tokugawa Yoshinobu
- Nicholas of Japan
- Jōno Saigiku
- Ichijō Mikako

== Access ==
The cemetery lies 1 minute from JR's Nippori Station and 5 minutes from JR's Nishi-Nippori Station and Uguisudani Station.

== Gallery ==
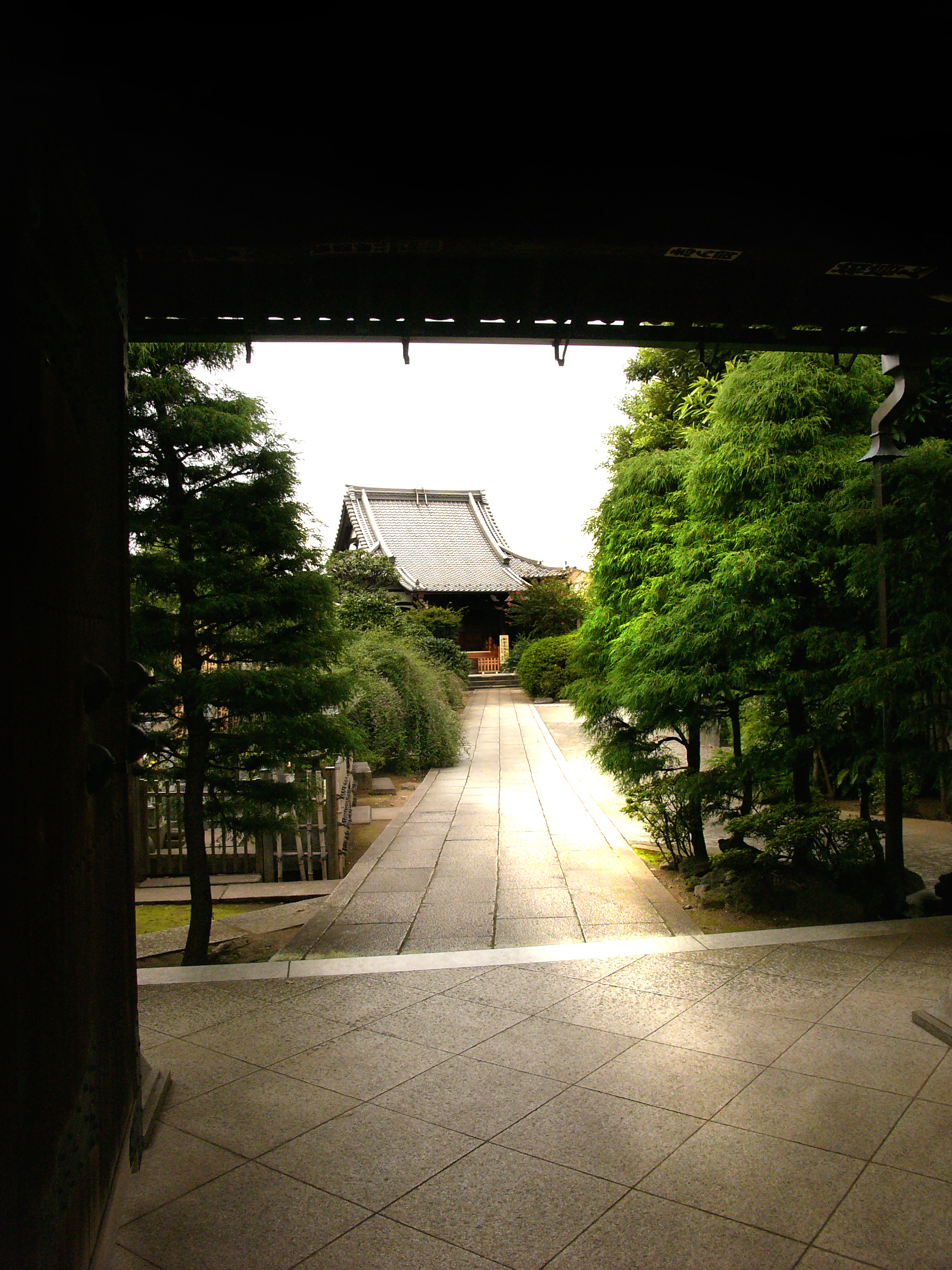

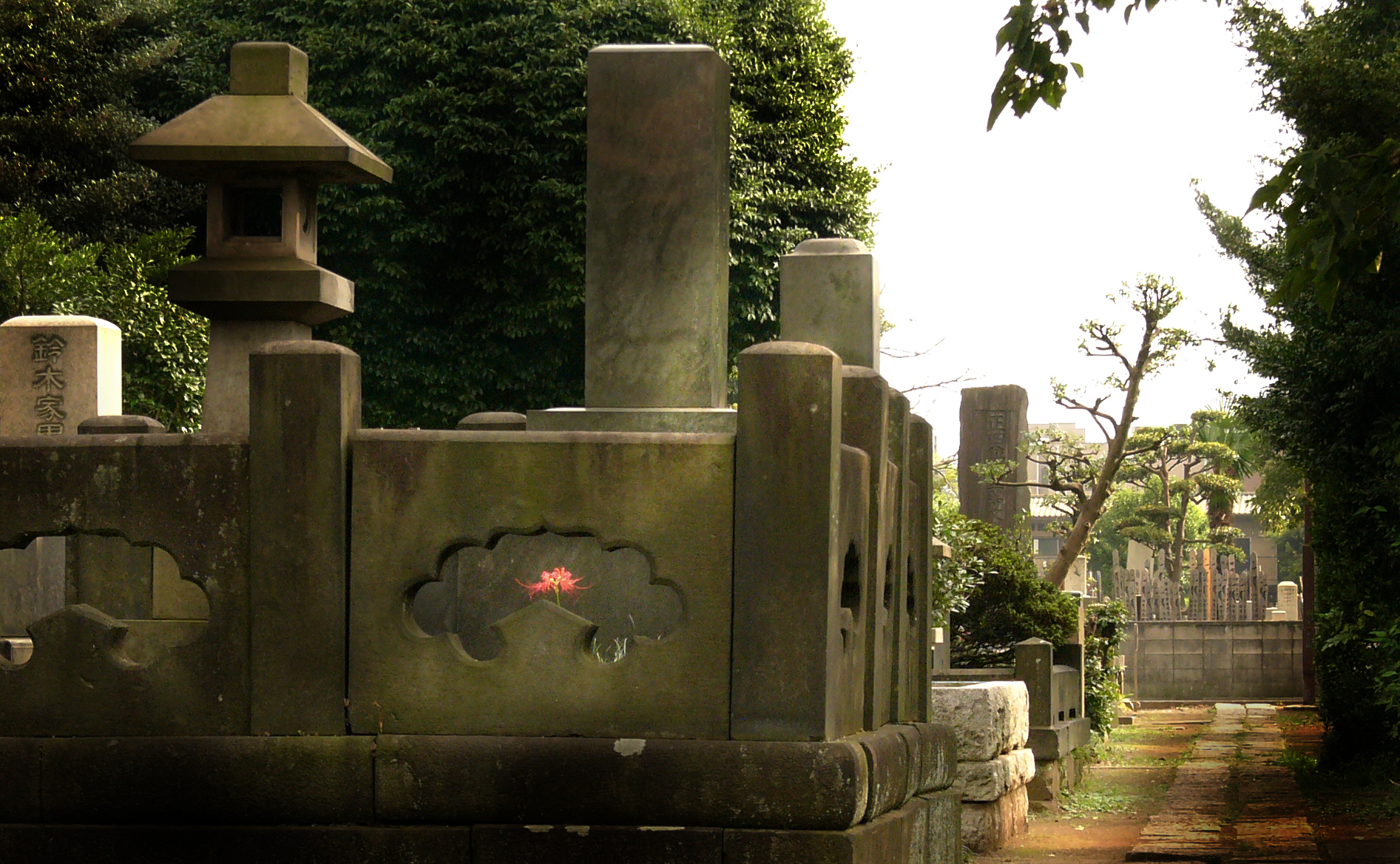

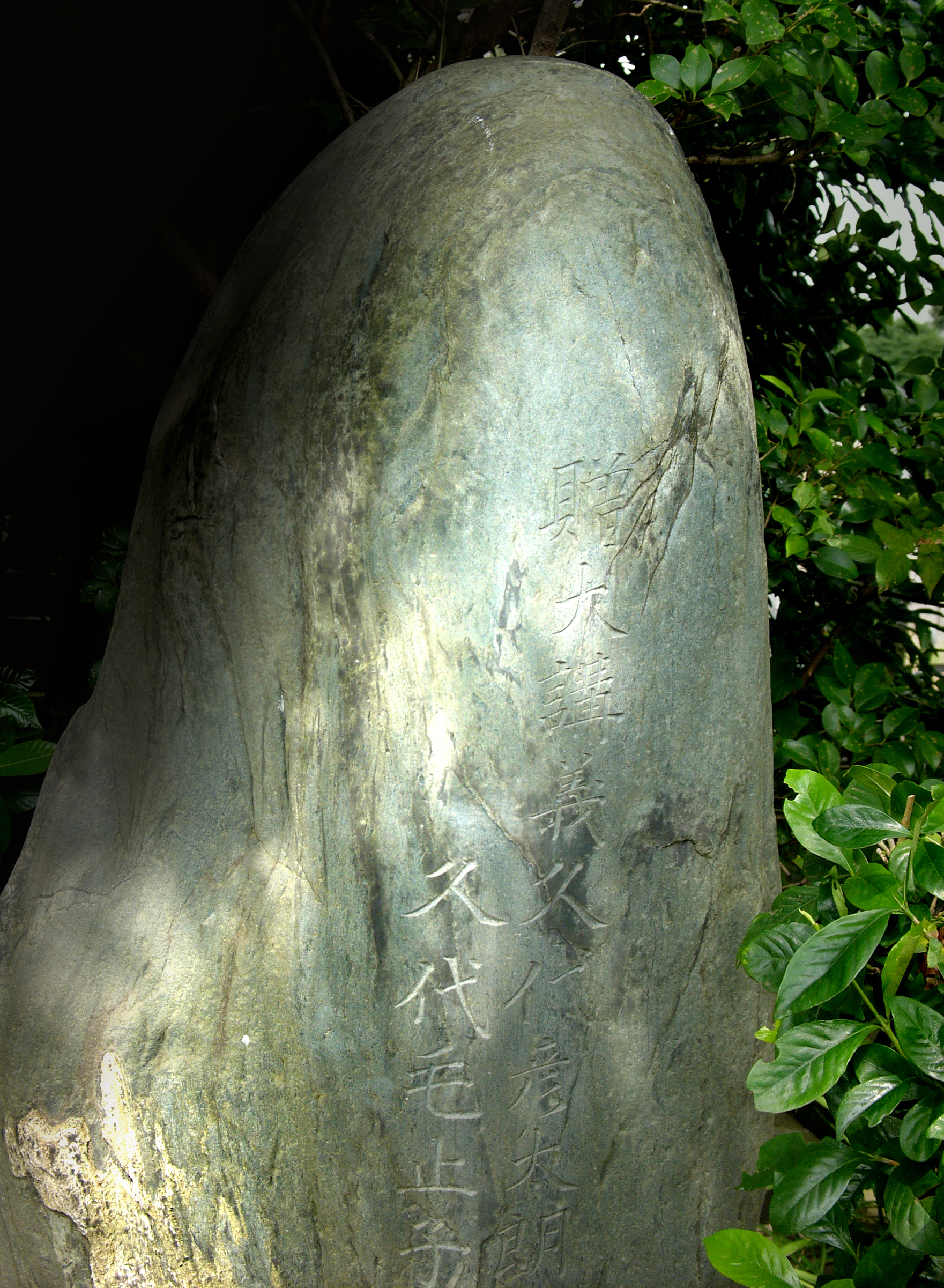

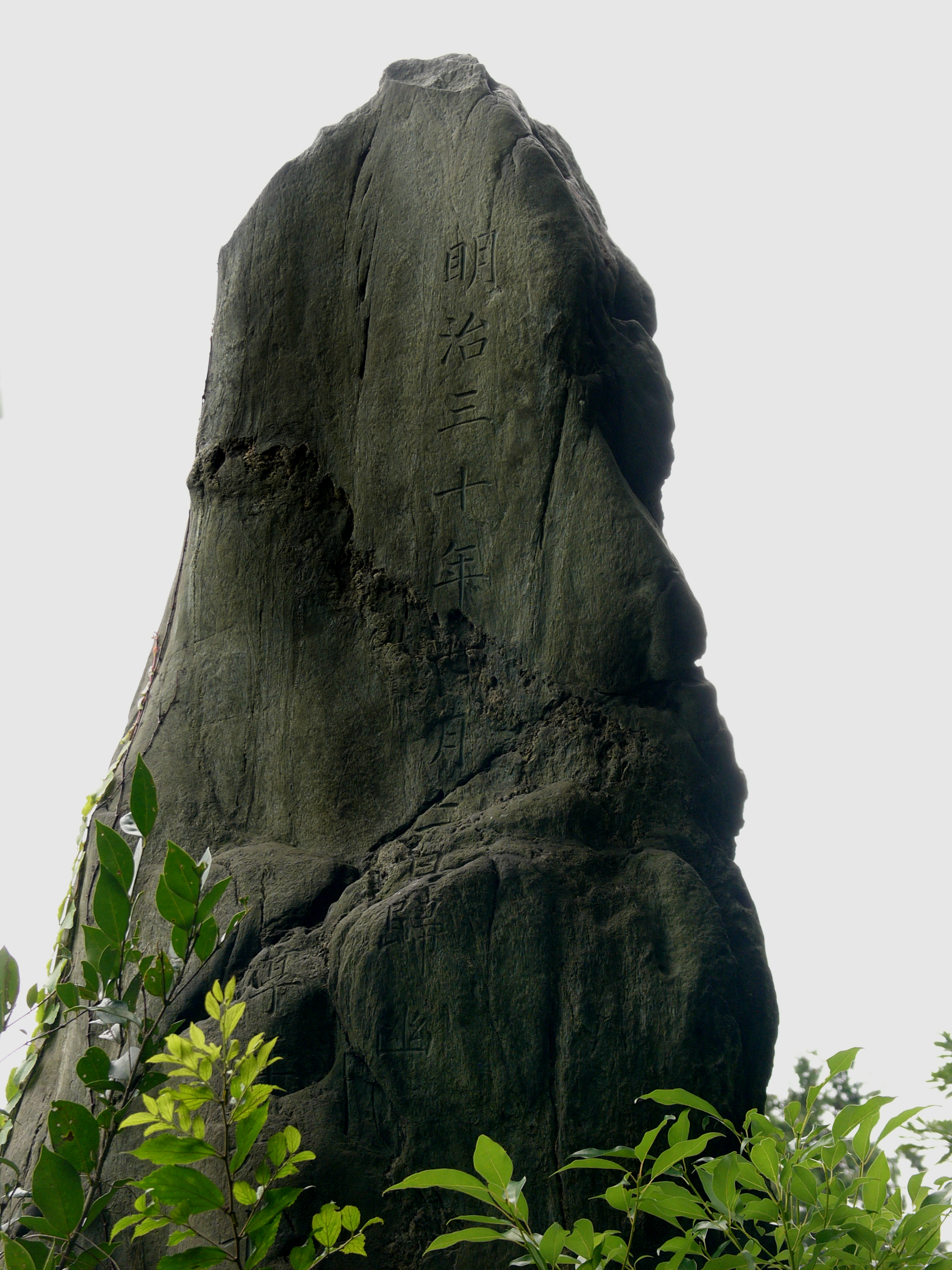

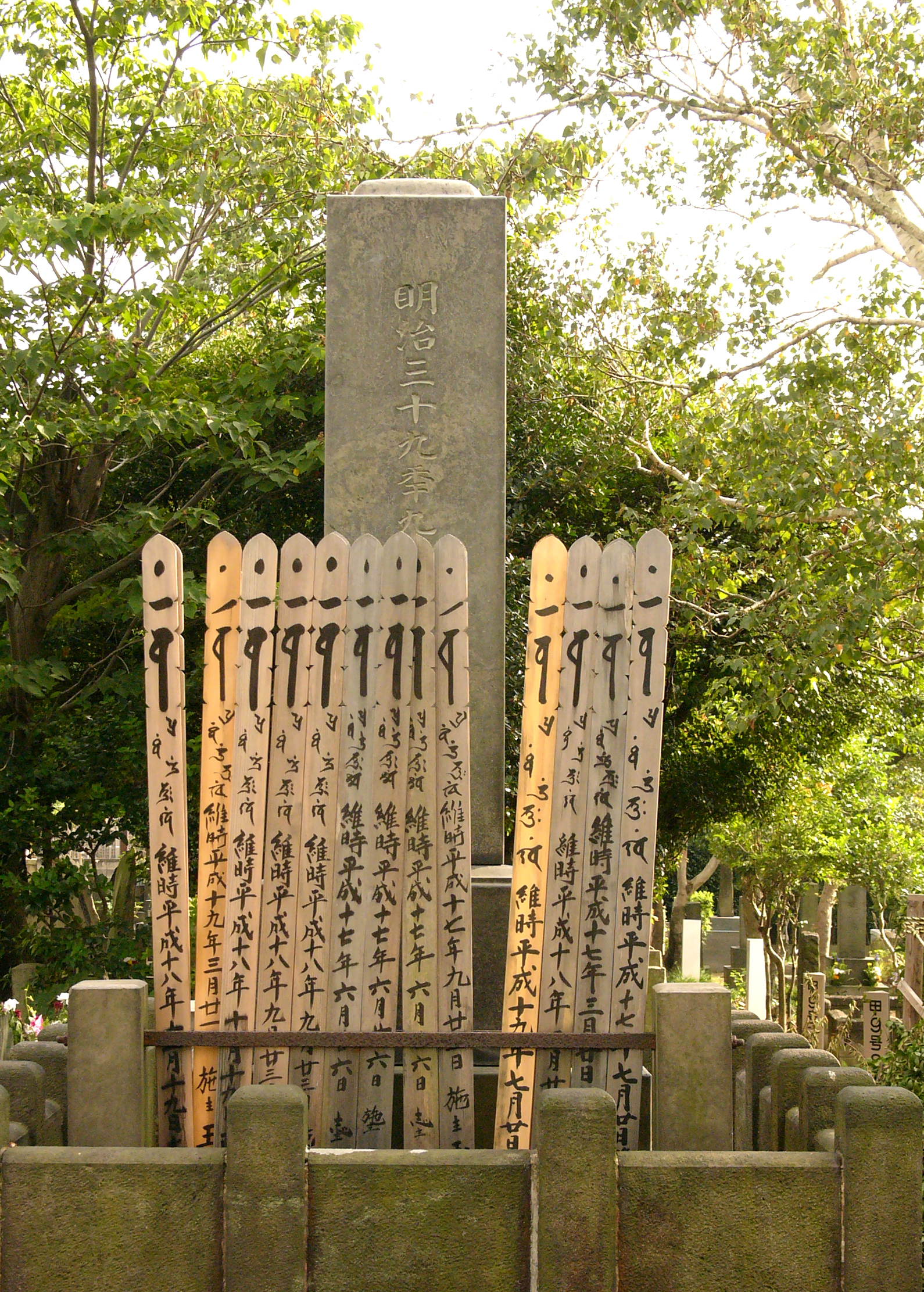

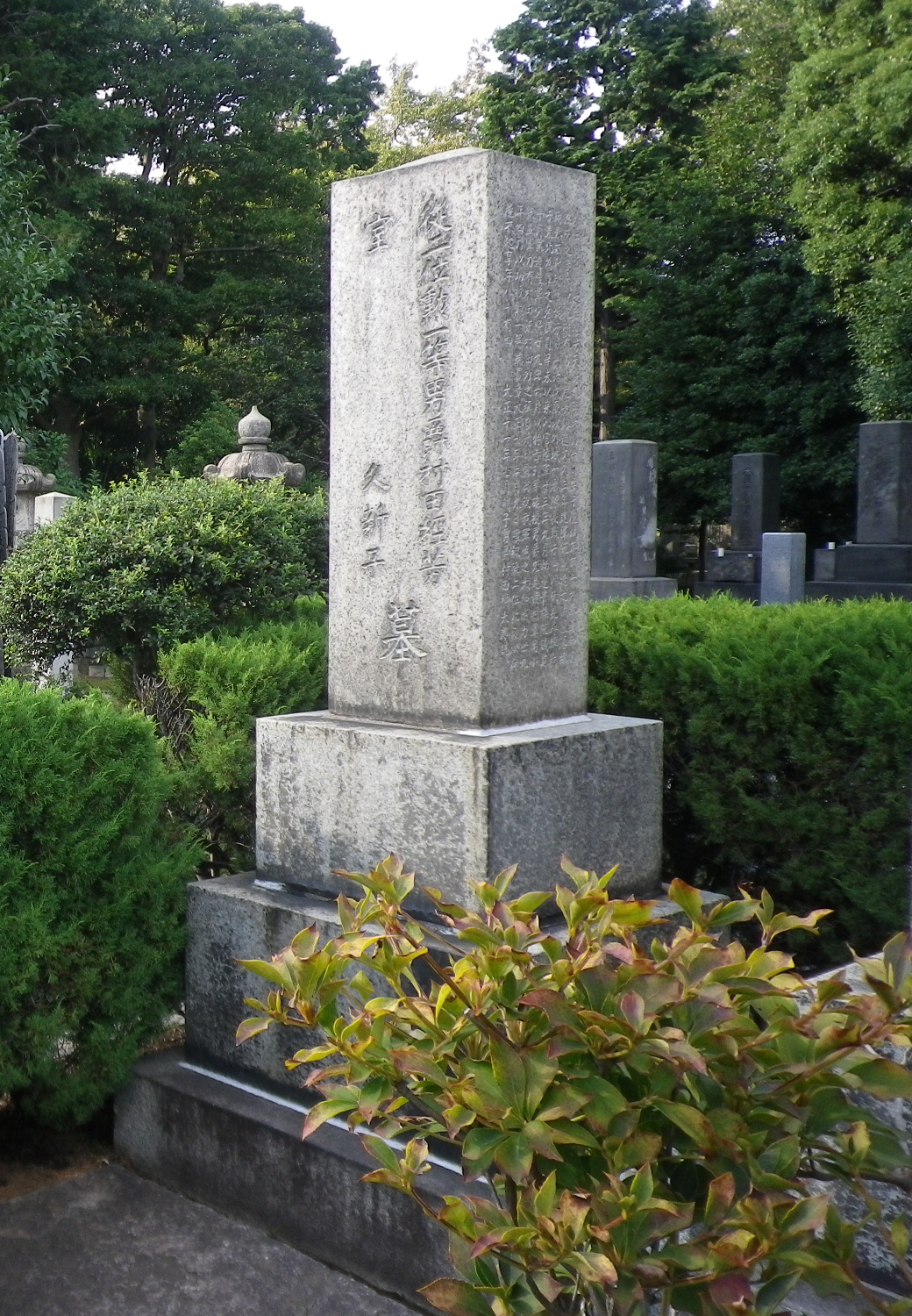

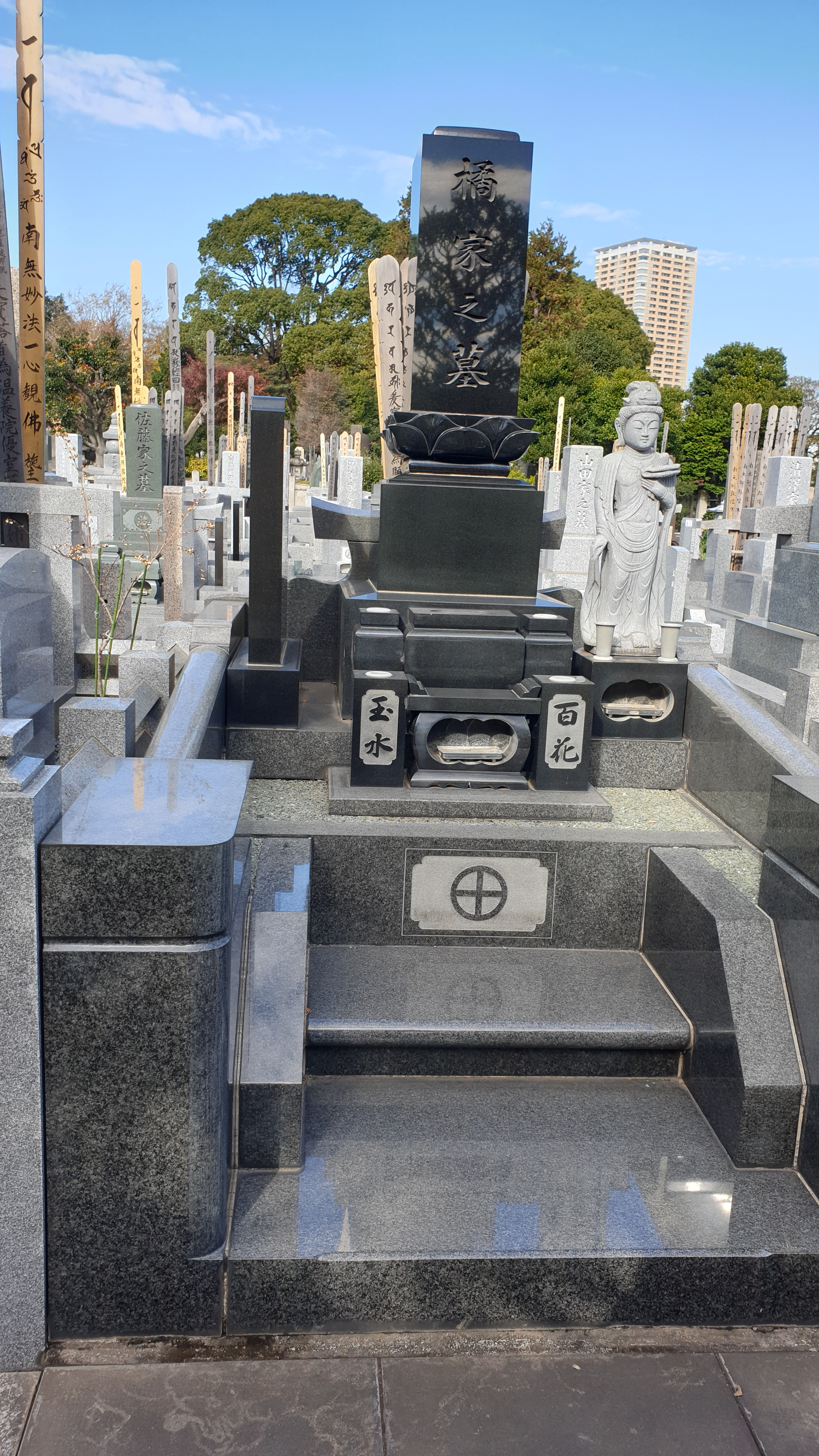

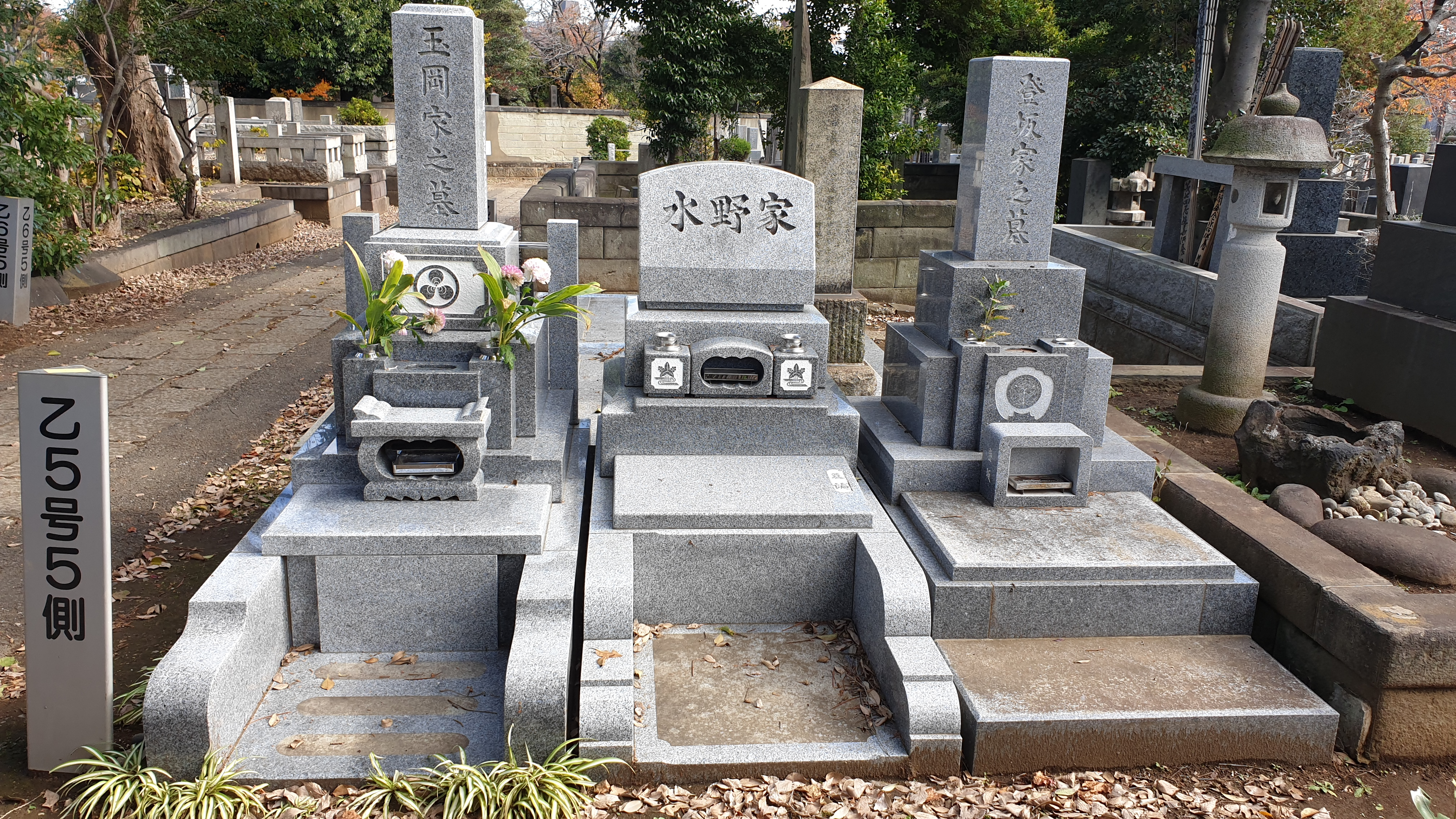

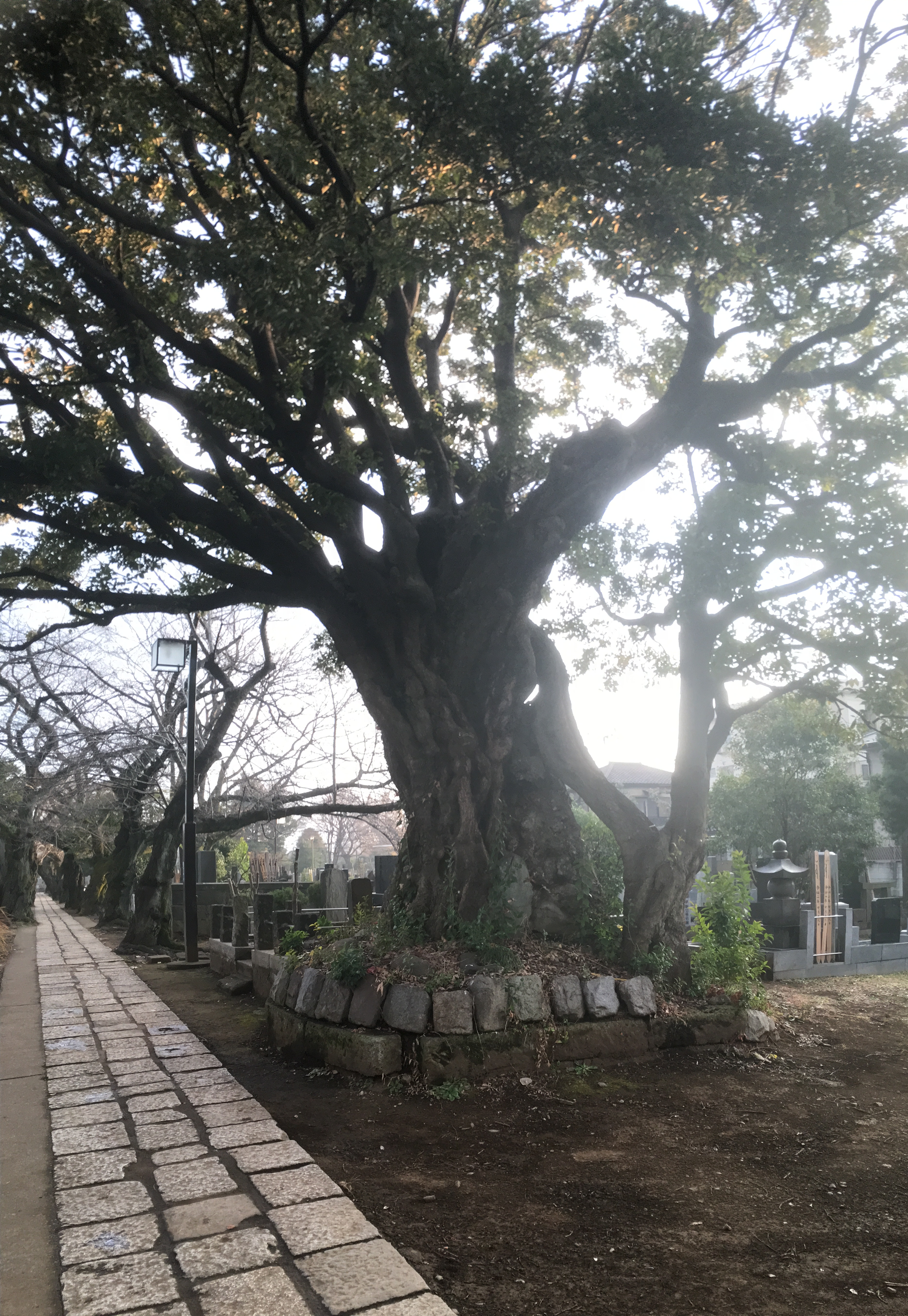
