= Yanaka, Tokyo =

Neighborhood in Taitō-ku, Tokyo

Coordinates: 35°43′26″N 139°46′06″E

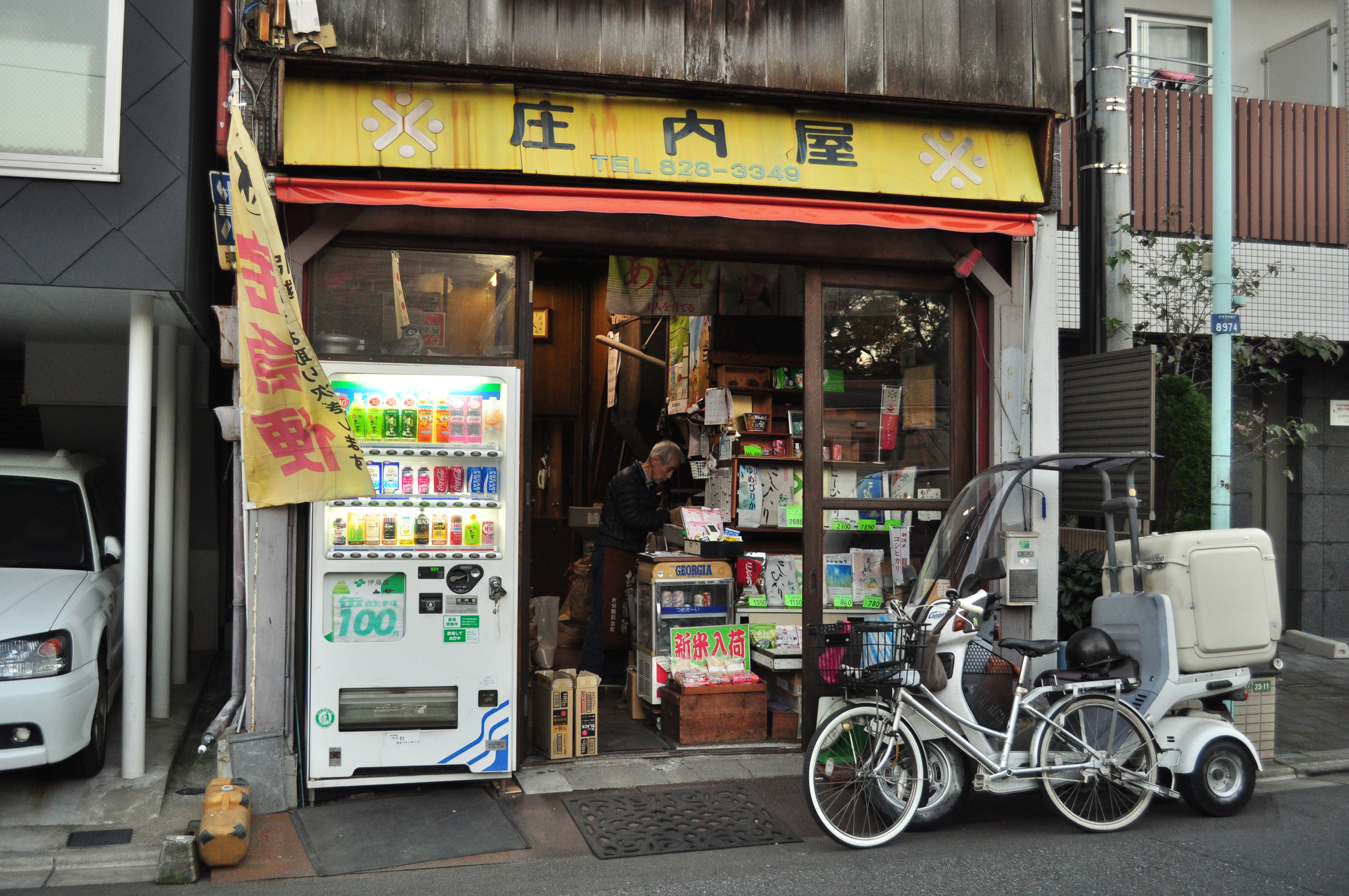
A typical shop in Yanaka (2014)

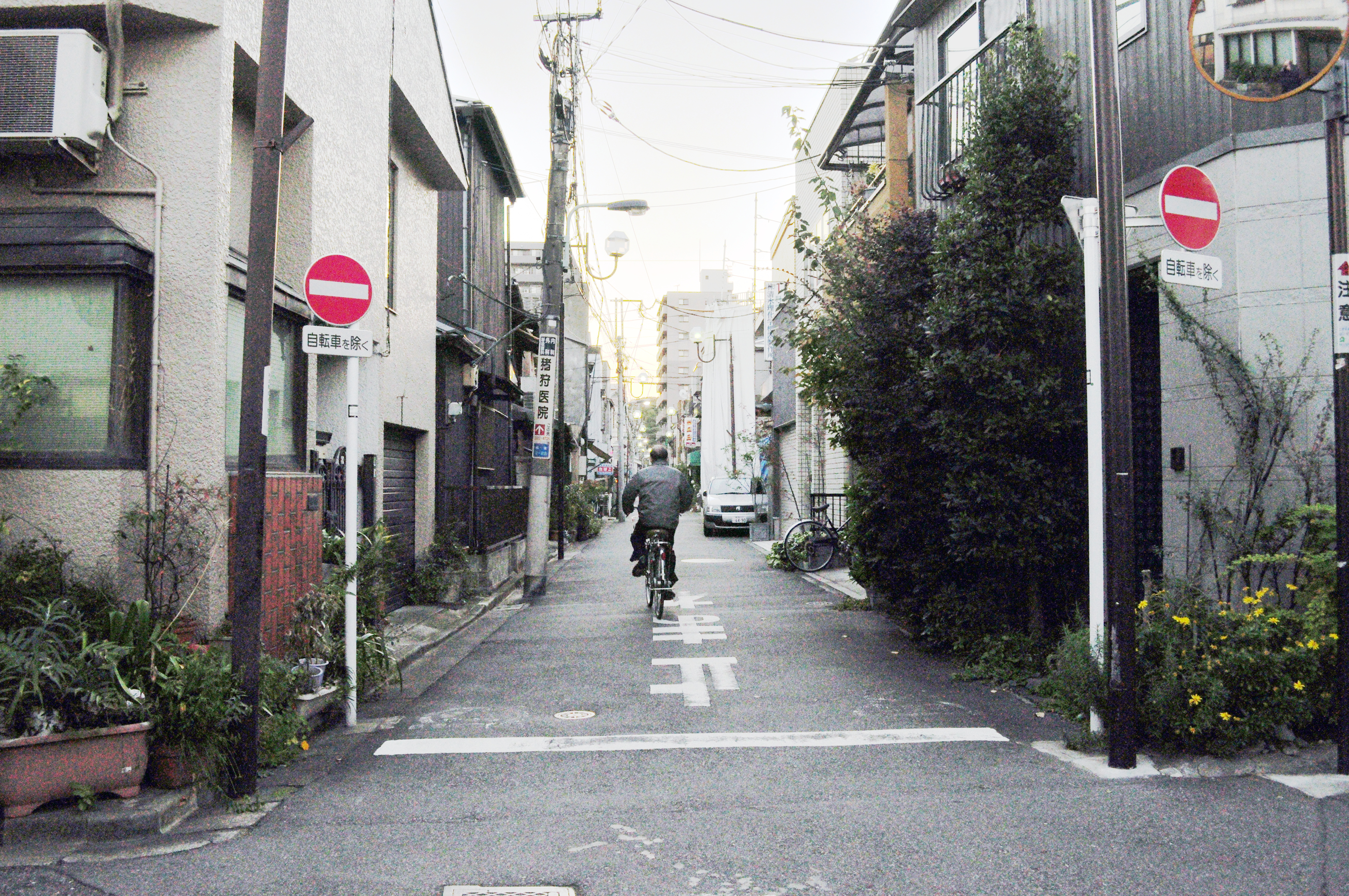
A typical residential street in Yanaka (2014)

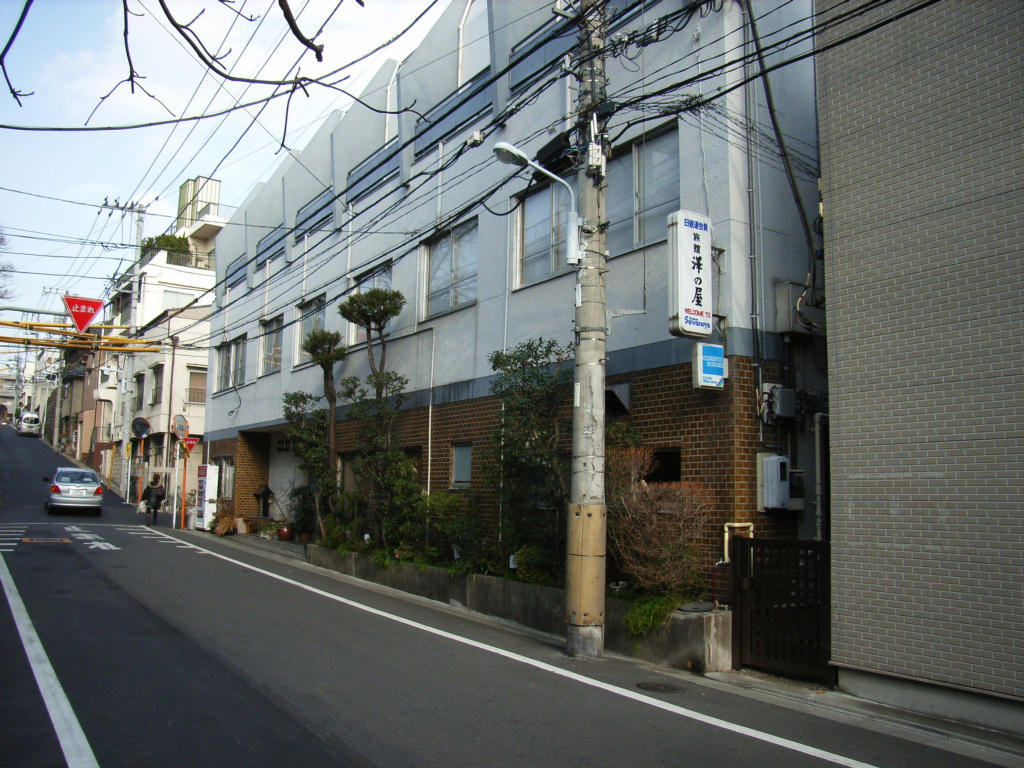
Ryokan Sawanoya

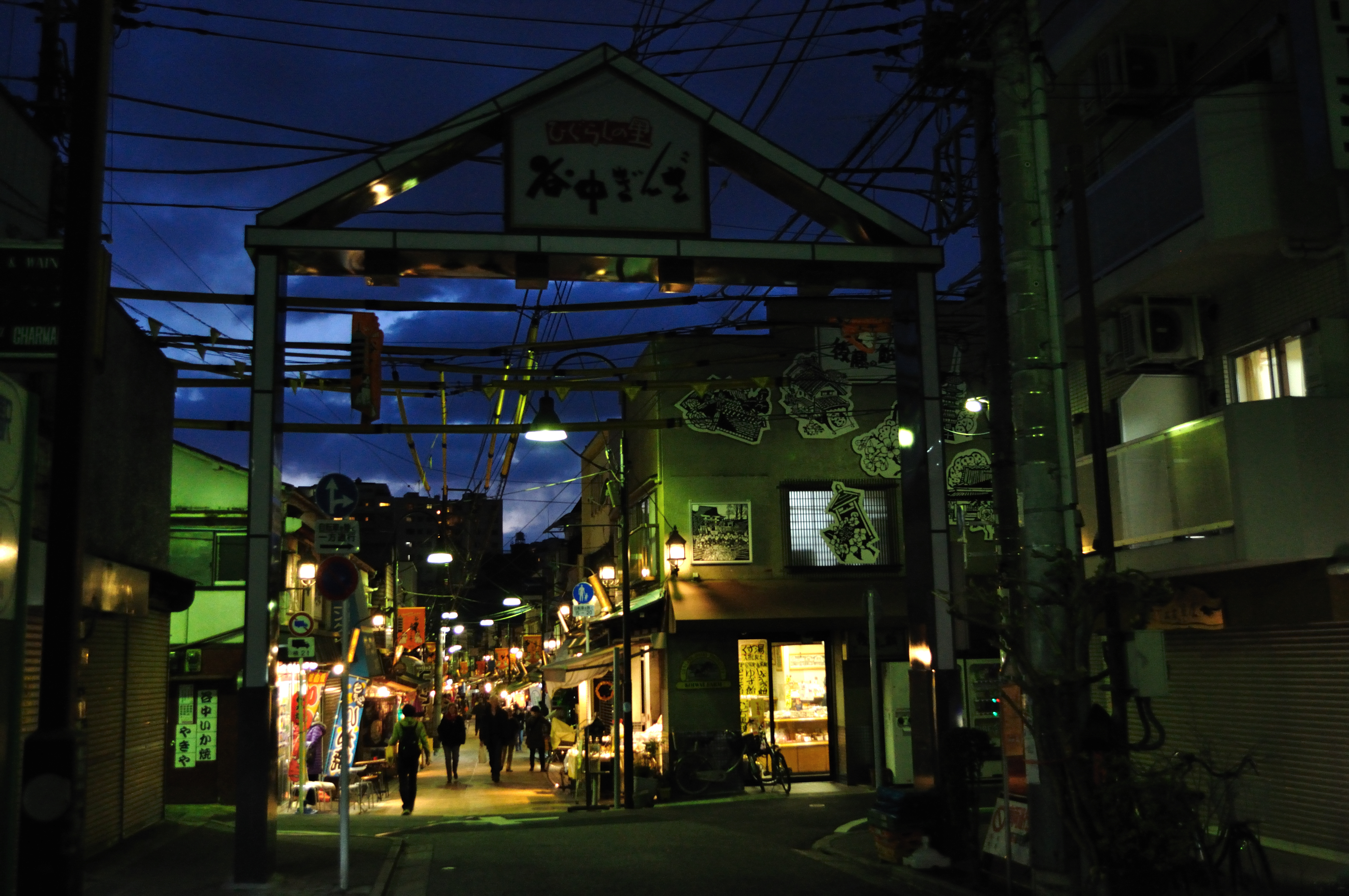
Twilight Yanaka

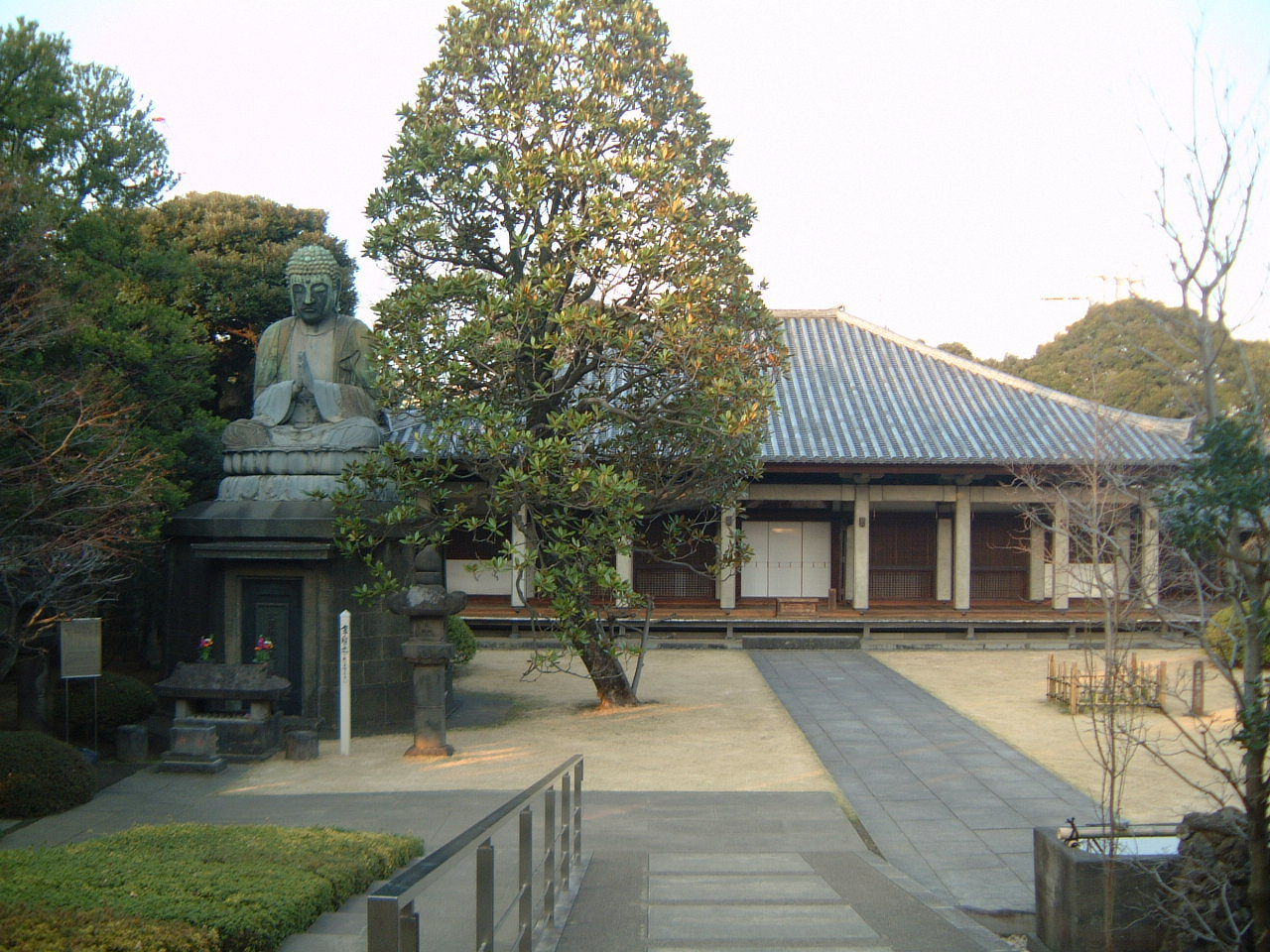
Tennō-ji (Taitō)

Yanaka (谷中) is a sector of Taito, Tokyo, Japan and, along with nearby Nezu and Sendagi neighborhoods in Bunkyo ward, together called Yanesen, is one of the few Tokyo neighborhoods in which the old Shitamachi atmosphere can still be felt. Located north of Ueno, Yanaka includes the large Yanaka Cemetery, which takes up most of Yanaka 7-chome. The Daimyo Clock Museum is also in Yanaka. There are around 70 privately owned small stores in Yanaka.

The neighborhood survived both the earthquake of 1923 and the fire bombing of 1945.

== Education ==
Taito City Board of Education operates public elementary and junior high schools.

Yanaka 2-7-chome and portions of 1-chome are zoned to Yanaka Elementary School (谷中小学校). Portions of Yanaka 1-chome are zoned to Shinobu Gaoka Elementary School (忍岡小学校). All of Yanaka (1-7-chome) is zoned to Ueno Junior High School (上野中学校).
