= Her Brother =

1960 Japanese film

- Poster
- Directed by: Kon Ichikawa
- Written by: Yōko Mizuki
- Based on: Otōto; 1956 novel by Aya Koda
- Produced by: Hiroaki Fujii; Masaichi Nagata
- Starring: Keiko Kishi; Hiroshi Kawaguchi; Kinuyo Tanaka; Masayuki Mori
- Cinematography: Kazuo Miyagawa
- Edited by: Tatsuji Nakashizu
- Music by: Yasushi Akutagawa
- Production company: Daiei Film
- Distributed by: Daiei Film
- Release date: 1 November 1960 (Japan)
- Running time: 97 minutes
- Country: Japan
- Language: Japanese

Her Brother (Japanese: おとうと, Hepburn: Otōto; lit. 'Younger Brother') is a 1960 Japanese drama film directed by Kon Ichikawa. It is based on the novel Otōto by Aya Koda.

== Plot ==
In Taishō era Tokyo, 17-year-old Gen takes care of the household of her family due to her stepmother's rheumatism. Meanwhile, her younger brother Hekiro lives a carefree life, repeatedly getting into trouble and making gambling debts. Neither his stepmother interferes with his behaviour, nor does the detached father, a famous novelist. Only Gen scolds Hekiro from time to time, for which he ridicules her, although she is completely devoted to him. When Hekiro falls terminally ill with tuberculosis and is hospitalised, with his sister by his side every minute she can spare, he finally regrets his behaviour. After Hekiro's death, Gen collapses and is taken back home with anemia by the hospital personnel, but once she awakes, she returns to her role as the housekeeper without questioning.

== Cast ==
- Keiko Kishi as Gen
- Hiroshi Kawaguchi as Hekiro
- Kinuyo Tanaka as Mother
- Masayuki Mori as Father
- Kyōko Kishida as Mrs. Tanuma
- Noboru Nakaya as Patrolman Rokoru Shimizu
- Kyōko Enami as Nurse Miyata
- Jun Hamamura as Doctor
- Hikaru Hoshi as Owner of hiring horse
- Juzo Itami as Son of Factory owner
- Noriko Hodaka as Nurse

== Invention of Bleach Bypass ==
Cinematographer Kazuo Miyagawa was inspired by the sophisticated color timing Oswald Morris deployed for John Huston's 1956 film of Moby Dick. Morris achieved the desaturated effect of Moby Dick by a complicated and expensive treatment of the three negative color separations. Not only was this technique unknown to Miyagawa at the time of Her Brother's post-production, but it would have proved far too expensive for the modest budget of the Japanese film.

After much experimentation, Miyagawa recreated the pastel color palette of Moby Dick through the far simpler technique of skipping the bleaching stage at the end of internegative film processing. This bleaching removes silver crystals from film prints struck from the original camera negative. These crystals are necessary to form naturastic ratios between the dyes that tint color film, but before Miyagawa's invention of bleach bypass the crystals were always chemically removed ("bleached") from prints as their opacity reduces the saturation of projected colors.

At the 1961 Cannes Film Festival, Her Brother received a special mention by the French association of image and sound technicians (CST) for Miyagawa's innovative film processing. The technique has since proved influential to Western cinematographers, with Roger Deakins and Steven Soderbergh both applying it to their films Nineteen Eighty-Four and Traffic.

== Awards (selected) ==
Her Brother was awarded several national film prizes, including:

- Blue Ribbon Award for Best Film, Best Director and Best Cinematography
- Kinema Junpo Award for Best Film and Best Director
- Mainichi Film Concour for Best Film, Best Director, Best Cinematography, Best Art Direction (Tomoo Shimogawara), and Best Actors (starring and supporting) Keiko Kishi, Kinuyo Tanaka, and Masayuki Mori

== Legacy ==
In later years, Her Brother has seen repeated screenings at festivals and film museums such as the Cinémathèque Française in 2008 and 2022, the Berlin International Film Festival in 2015, and the Museum of Modern Art in 2018.
