= Katsunori Yanaka =

Japanese Go player

Personal information
- Native name: 矢中克典 (Japanese); ヤナカカツノリ (Japanese)
- Full name: Katsunori Yanaka
- Born: December 21, 1971 (age 54) Osaka, Japan

Sport
- Turned pro: 1992
- Teacher: Teruo Matsuoka
- Rank: 8 dan
- Affiliation: Nihon Ki-in, Kansai branch

Katsunori Yanaka (矢中克典, Yanaka Katsunori; born December 21, 1971) is a professional Go player.

== Biography ==
Katsunori became a professional in 1992. He was promoted to 8 dan in 2002.

== Promotion record ==
Rank	Year	Notes
1 dan	1992	
2 dan	1992	
3 dan	1993	
4 dan	1995	
5 dan	1996	
6 dan	1998	
7 dan	2000	
8 dan	2002	
9 dan	2019	

== Trivia ==
- On Pandanet he plays as Yanaka
