= Sumeragi =

Sumeragi (皇, lit. "emperor") is a Japanese surname indicating relation to the Imperial House.

== People ==
- Natsuki Sumeragi (皇 名月 or 皇 なつき, born 1967), Japanese illustrator and comic artist
- Kaoru Sumeragi, Japanese anime director

== Fictional characters ==
- Aika Sumeragi (皇 藍華), a character from Agent Aika
- Daichi Sumeragi (皇 大地), a character from Beyblade
- Hotsuma Sumeragi, a character from Niraikanai: Harukanaru Neno Kuni
- Itsuki Sumeragi (皇 伊月), a character from Kakegurui – Compulsive Gambler
- Kaguya Sumeragi (皇 神楽耶), a character from Code Geass
- Rinko and Sen Sumeragi, characters from Dash! Yonkuro
- Subaru Sumeragi (皇 昴流), from the manga Tokyo Babylon, X/1999 and Tsubasa: Reservoir Chronicle
- Hokuto Sumeragi (皇 北都), twin sister of Subaru, from the manga Tokyo Babylon and X/1999
- Sumeragi Lee Noriega (スメラギ・李・ノリエガ), a character from Mobile Suit Gundam 00
- Uruka and Tenkai Sumeragi (皇 うるか & 皇 天海), characters from Steel Angel Kurumi 2
- Yōko Sumeragi (皇 蓉子), a character from Yami to Bōshi to Hon no Tabibito
- Kira Sumeragi (皇 綺羅), a character from Uta no Prince-sama
- Ryuji Sumeragi (皇 リュウジ), a character from B-Daman
- Maki Sumeragi (皇 マキ), a character from Inazuma Eleven
- Chain Sumeragi (チェイン・皇), a character from Blood Blockade Battlefront
- Reisys VI Felicity Sumeragi, a character Self-proclaimed from Boku wa Tomodachi ga Sukunai
- Yuito Sumeragi (ユイト・スメラギ), a character from Scarlet Nexus
- Sumeragi, a character from Fire Emblem Fates
- Satsuki Sumeragi, a character from Seirei Gensouki: Spirit Chronicles
