= X (TV series) =

Japanese anime television series

- Key visual of the series
- Genre: Action; Dark fantasy; Supernatural thriller
- Anime television series
- Directed by: Yoshiaki Kawajiri
- Produced by: Masao Maruyama; Jōichi Mizuno; Michiko Suzuki; Shinji Komori
- Written by: Yuki Enatsu
- Music by: Naoki Satō
- Studio: Madhouse
- Licensed by: Crunchyroll (Note: Formerly known as Funimation.); AUS: Siren Visual; UK: MVM Films
- Original network: WOWOW
- Original run: 3 October 2001 – 27 March 2002
- Episodes: 24 + 1 OVA
- Related media
- X (1996) anime film

X, also known as X TV, is a Japanese anime television series based on the 1992 manga series by Clamp. It was produced by Madhouse and directed by Yoshiaki Kawajiri. Its twenty-four episodes were broadcast in Japan on WOWOW from October 2001 to March 2002. The story takes place at the end of the days, in the year 1999. It follows Kamui Shiro, a young esper who returns home to Tokyo after a six-year absence to face his destiny as the one who will determine humanity's fate. There, he discovers two organizations who want to take him as well as another person who shares Kamui's same talent.

== Plot ==
With the manga's serialization on hiatus, the animated adaptation show the young esper Kamui Shiro reaching different fates. Kamui returns to his home, Tokyo, after a six-year absence following his mother's last will. According to her, he can change the world's fate. He can either join the group Dragons of Heaven or Dragons of Earth and fight for mankind or the nature, respectively. Kamui's choice to protect mankind solely by his desire to based on his love towards his childhood friend Kotori and Fuma Monou transforms him into a Dragon of the Heaven. In contrast, Fuma suffers a personality change and becomes Kamui's opposite from the Dragons of Earth. The new Fuma kills Kotori in coldblood and swears his friend to kill him. This causes Kamui to fall into catatonia as part of the trauma. However, the Dragon of Heaven Subaru Sumeragi enters into Kamui's inner mind and convinces to face reality and grant his wish. Kamui decides to side with the Dragons of Heaven to recover the old Fuma, but lacks the powers needed to create a barrier.

Kamui goes to fight Fūma after Hinoto's suicide unseals the Sacred Sword, which can be used as a catalyst to enhance the power of both Kamuis. Fuma uses the former Dragon of Heaven Arashi to intervene but he is stopped by Sorata who uses his last forces to burn his body. Fuma kills Nataku and absorbs his flesh to recover. Kamui then tries to kill Fūma after learning his loss was predetermined. Kamui is severely wounded in combat as Kamui gave on his own ideals. Before Fuma kills Kamui and the Armageddon ends, Subaru takes the hit from Fuma's Sacred Sword and again encourages him to grant Kamui to grant his own wish even if he comes across as selfish. In the final battle, Kamui sacrifices his life to create a barrier that will protect mankind and passes Fūma his will, which restores his personality. In the epilogue, the survivors from each side resume their lives with Subaru's late sister Hokuto joining the Dragon of Earth Kakyo Kuzuki in the afterlife.

== Production ==
For the X television series, director Yoshiaki Kawajiri decided not to explore Kamui's backstory early in the series and to focus more on his cold demeanor. Kawajiri considered Kamui weak because of how much it costs him to express emotions. As a result, he portrayed Kamui as a strong person, though his weakness becomes noticeable as the narrative progresses. Because Kamui did not have many lines in the original video animation, his voice actor, Kenichi Suzumura, lacked a full impression of him before more of his character was explored in the television series. Suzumura found his role complicated because he understood Kamui is neither the weakest nor the strongest character. Voicing Kamui meant Suzumura debuted as a singer for an X CD. Fuma's voice actor, Junichi Suwabe, found voicing him difficult due to his dual personality: one kind, and the other cold-hearted. He also noted that the X manga was very popular in Japan, and he wanted to meet audience expectations. Suwabe befriended Suzumura. Kotori's character was modified for the TV series as Kawajiri wanted to portray her as a more regular teenager in contrast to her weaker persona from the manga.

The series was first announced by the original manga creators, the artists group Clamp, in October 2000. The script was handled by Hiroko Tokita, Kazuyuki Fudeyasu, Kenji Sugihara and Yuki Enatsu. Koshinori Kanemori adapted Clamp's character designs and served as art director along with Yuji Ikeda. The music for the series was composed by Naoki Satō, with two original soundtrack albums released on 19 December 2001 and 6 March 2002. The TV series uses two theme songs: "eX Dream" by Masatoshi Nishimura (credited as "Myuji") is used as the opening theme, while "Secret Sorrow" by Kohei Koizumi is used as the ending theme. The OVA's ending theme is "STRENGTH" by Kouhei Koizumi.

A common theme in X involves how the future is predetermined to every person with Kamui's exception as he can choose a group to join. While the movie forces Kamui to face his biggest fear and slay Fuma, the television series explores Kamui's free will which he uses in the climax to solve the dilemma provided by the narrative.

=== Release ===
In anticipation to the series premiere, an original video animation (OVA) was produced: An Omen (予兆, Yochō). It was directed-to-DVD on 25 August 2001. Written and directed by Kawajiri, the OVA tells the story of the upcoming battles through the prophecies of Kakyō Kuzuki, dreamgazer for the organization Dragon of Earth, and acts as primer for viewers not familiar with Clamp's manga. The series premiered on 3 October 2001 on WOWOW satellite television and finished on 27 March 2002, totaling twenty-four episodes. A total of twelve DVD volumes from the series, each containing two episodes, were released in Japan from 25 February 2001 to 25 January 2002, by Bandai Visual.

Pioneer Entertainment (later Geneon USA) announced the English release of the series in North America in March 2002, with an English dub provided by Bang Zoom! Entertainment. The episodes and the OVA were released in a total of eight DVD volumes between 24 September 2002 and 25 November 25 2003. Two DVD box sets were also released on 11 January 2005. In 2006, Geneon released the X TV Series Re-Mix, which was composed of five individual DVDs, released between 11 July and 14 November 2006; they also released a DVD box set including these five DVDs on 11 July 2006. The DVDs came with re-mastered video and audio, including remixed 5.1 Dolby Digital AC3 surround sound for both the Japanese and English tracks. In September 2009, Funimation announced that it had acquired the rights to the anime series and OVA. They re-released the series on a DVD box set on 15 June 2010, using the original Geneon dubbing for the English-language audio track. The series was also streamed on Hulu in 2010.

== Reception ==
The 2001 incarnation makes use of its longer running time and episode format to explore the original mythos and works the characters' back-stories into the narrative through the use of flashbacks. The television series is considered a better adaptation than the 1996 feature film by critics for its deeper focus on the characters. Zac Bertschy from Anime News Network felt that Fuma's transformation into the series' villain is more realistic in the television series. While comparing the two X adaptations, Comic Book Resources said that the television series had a bigger apocalyptic feel than the film, while the tragedy Rintaro portrayed in the film was more faithful to the manga and its themes.

In regards to the main character, Kamui's portrayal was often initially seen as weak with him coming across as initially anti-hero, but his dark past and actions would make him likeable. On the other hand, Andy Hanley from UK Anime Network found that despite the appealing backstory of Kamui to understand his emotions, it still "doesn't make him any less enjoyable to watch" when compared to other characters. Beveridge found Subaru's introduction in X one of his favorite episodes from the volume he reviewed because of the portrayal of the character's state since Hokuto's death. Bamboo Dong of Anime News Network found the series, "tries hard to please everyone, and comes daringly close to succeeding". Otaku USA recommended the series to people looking forward to the cancelled 2021 Tokyo Babylon anime series, referring to X as a "beautifully apocalypse story".

Among other characters, Subaru and Seishirō were praised as some of the deepest villains from X, pointing that Subaru was already developed in Tokyo Babylon. His confrontation with Subaru in the TV series was praised mainly because how their character designs were updated from the ones from Tokyo Babylon. Finding most characters interesting, THEM Anime Reviews found Sorata and Arashi's bond one of the best written relationships because of how close they become and the plot twists the television series gives them for the climax. Similarly, Beverdige—now writing for The Fandom Post regarded Kamui's and Fūma's relationship as one of the best parts of the anime series, stating while the rest of the cast is still amazing, few might make the audience miss the main conflict of the two characters. However, he felt their final battle to be anti-climatic possibly as a result of Clamp having never concluded the manga. DVD Talk had positive thoughts about the characters' relationships, finding them "strong" and praised the amount of violence they provided in the anime's second half.

Critics also focused on the visuals. Zac Bertschy commented that, "the animation quality is consistently very high" and the characters are "never off model"; "each episode is animated with an amazing flash of style and fluidity". DVDTalk commented the animation aged well and only the OVA appears to suffer of some issues in general animation. Beveridge also commented on the character designs, finding them appealing and well balanced in contrast to other Clamp characters like the leads from Code Geass or Tsubasa: Reservoir Chronicle who sometimes look offmodeled. Beveridge later praised Kamui and Fuma's final fight in the television series for having its "own level of epic sadness and tragedy". THEM Anime Reviews felt sometimes the animation was more average due to certain repetitive frames. There were mixed responses to the English cast for not being as appealing as the Japanese ones. A big exception according to Anime News Network was Kotori Monou's actress, Michelle Ruff. DVD Talk found the English actors suitable for their roles in the television series. Bertschy felt that Steve Cannon lacked the appeal of Kenichi Suzumura when portraying the lead of X. Tomokazu Sugita's portrayal of Subaru in X was praised by Merumo who also enjoyed the older characterization envisioned in this series. In regards to the audio, THEM Anime Reviews had dood feelings in regards to the tracks and enjoyed the opening theme.

Clamp headwriter Nanase Ohkawa stated the manga group left everything in the hands of staff in charge for it, including the scripts, the cast choices and everything else. As a result, Ohkawa considered herself and her colleagues as viewers. They found the television series as a proper adaptation of the manga even though the source material never reached its ending. In August 2011, Suzumura married singer and actor Maaya Sakamoto; as a gift, Clamp made an illustration of Kamui holding Tomoyo from Tsubasa: Reservoir Chronicle, since the latter is voiced by Sakamoto.

Namco producer Masa has been overseeing X both professionally and privately. When he heard that a TV anime was going to start in June 2001, he thought it would be possible to recreate the world of series in a game. While game was based on the TV anime version, and it was difficult to faithfully recreate that world in the game. It was released PlayStation on 22 August 2002.
