= Otoya Kawano =

Japanese voice actor (born 1965)

Otoya Kawano (かわの をとや, Kawano Otoya; born August 18, 1965) is a Japanese voice actor who was born in Taketa, Ōita.

== Notable voice roles ==
- Seishiro Sakurazuka in X/1999 the series
- Gain Bijo in Overman King Gainer
- Bougan man in Samurai 7
- Ikazuchi no Takamaru in Onmyō Taisenki
- Ryūjirō Sasaki in Samurai Champloo
- Kaiden Bugster (ep. 21, 24, 37) in Kamen Rider Ex-Aid
