= X (1996 film) =

1996 Japanese animated film by Rintaro

- Theatrical release poster, featuring Kamui Shiro (left) and Fuma Monou (right)
- Directed by: Rintaro
- Screenplay by: Rintaro; Nanase Ohkawa
- Based on: X by Clamp
- Produced by: Kazuhiko Ikeguchi; Kazuo Yokoyama; Masao Maruyama
- Starring: Tomokazu Seki; Ken Narita
- Cinematography: Hitoshi Yamaguchi
- Edited by: Harutoshi Ogata; Satoshi Terauchi; Yukiko Ito
- Music by: Yasuaki Shimizu
- Production company: Madhouse
- Distributed by: Toei Company
- Release dates: August 3, 1996 (Japan); March 10, 2000 (North America)
- Running time: 100 minutes
- Country: Japan
- Language: Japanese

X, also known as X/1999 and X: The Movie, is a 1996 Japanese animated film directed by Rintaro and animated by Madhouse. Rintaro wrote it alongside Clamp head writer Nanase Ohkawa. It is based on the 1992 manga series by Clamp. It premiered on August 3, 1996, in Japan and had a limited screening in North America in 2000. The film focuses on the roles Kamui Shiro, Kotori Monou, and Fuma Monou play in the Apocalypse. After his mother's death, the young Kamui returns to Tokyo to participate in a Holy War between two groups who seek to either protect humankind or protect nature at the cost of humankind.

Rintaro was approached by Kadokawa Shoten to direct this movie and worked with Ohkawa, Clamp's head writer, to create a self-contained story with a style and atmosphere that might be accepted by the viewers. The film's theme song is "Forever Love" by X Japan, composed by Yoshiki. The film received mixed reviews, with praise for the visuals, but criticism for the story and pacing.

== Plot ==
After his mother dies to create a "Sacred Sword" to seal it into his body, a young man named Kamui Shiro goes back to his hometown Tokyo to understand his fate. As he arrives, he learns of a current war between two factions known as the Dragons of the Heavens and the Dragons of the Earth who seek the survival of humankind and nature, respectively. Shortly after Kamui's arrival, Subaru Sumeragi from the Heavens and Seishirō Sakurazuka from the Earth kill each other, resulting in a moment in the destruction of part of the city. Kamui meets his childhood friends Fuma Monou and Kotori Monou whom he came back to protect, but he and Fuma start suffering visions when seeing each other. Kamui is then attacked by the Dragons of Earth but is saved by the ones from the Heavens. As this happens Kotori is kidnapped by a woman named Kanoe while Fuma follows her.

Kamui is contacted by Princess Hinoto, Kanoe's sister, who seeks to recruit Kamui into the Dragons of Heavens to protect humankind from this war. Kamui refuses to take such responsibility but remains concerned about Fuma and Kotori. Kanoe meets Fuma and recognizes him as the "other Kamui" who could replace the other and join the Dragons of Earth. Seichiro Aoki and Karen Kasumi from the Heavens face Nataku and Shōgo from the Earth respectively but all four fighters are murdered. Fearing Kotori and Fuma possibly being killed by the Dragons of Earth, Kamui joins the Dragons of Heavens alongside the members Arashi Kishū, Sorata Arisugawa and Yuzuriha Nekoi to face their Dragons of Earth. Upon meeting a man named Kusanagi Shiyū from the Earth, Kamui tries to get him to tell him Kotori and Fuma's whereabouts but he tries to kill him alongside Yuzuriha. As this happens, Kamui suffers visions again and Yuzuriha is killed in a battle with Yūto and Kusanagi while protecting Kamui. Fuma finds Kamui and murders Kusanagi alongside Yuto later on.

Fuma then kills Kotori as her body contains another Sacred Sword to wield in the war. The continuous deaths of the Dragons of Heavens cause the destruction of more areas from Tokyo. Before dying from the falling debris, Hinoto transports Kamui to a safe area to protect humankind. Fuma then attempts to kill Kamui who is unwilling to fight his friend. Eventually, Kamui is forced to unseal his own Sacred Sword and beheads Fuma. Despite being the winner of the war, Kamui is completely grief-stricken over what transpired and cries while holding Fuma's head in the remains of Tokyo.

== Cast ==
| Character | Japanese voice actor | English voice actor |
|---|---|---|
| Kamui Shirou | Tomokazu Seki | Alan Marriott |
| Fuma Monou | Ken Narita | Adam Henderson |
| Kotori Monou | Junko Iwao | Larrisa Murray |
| Kanoe | Atsuko Takahata | Denica Fairman |
| Princess Hinoto | Yuko Minaguchi | Stacey Jefferson |
| Sorata Arisugawa | Kōichi Yamadera | Mike Fitzpatrick |
| Seiichirō Aoki | Hideyuki Tanaka | David Jarvis |
| Shōgo Asagi | Toshihiko Seki | Rupert Degas |
| Yūto Kigai | Kazuhiko Inoue | Nigel Whitmey |
| Satsuki Yatōji | Kotono Mitsuishi | Julie Brahms |
| Yuzuriha Nekoi | Yukana Nogami | Anne-Marie Lewis |
| Arashi Kishū | Emi Shinohara | Teresa Gallagher |
| Karen Kasumi | Mami Koyama | Toni Barry |
| Tōru Shirō | Masako Ikeda | Liza Ross |
| Subaru Sumeragi | Issei Miyazaki | Mike Fitzpatrick |
| Seishirō Sakurazuka | Tōru Furusawa | Jeff Harding |
| Nataku | Rica Matsumoto | David Jarvis |
| Kusanagi Shiyū | Jōji Nakata | Jeff Harding |

== Production ==
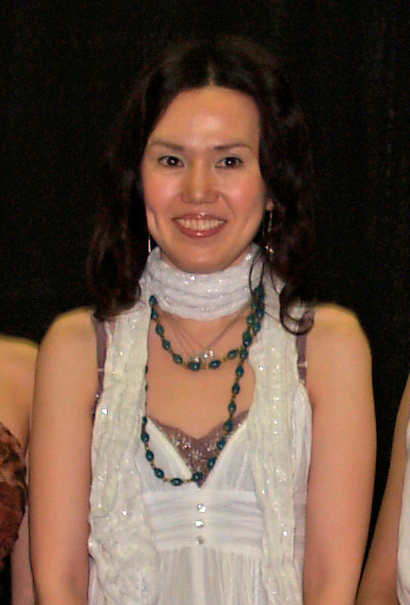
Nanase Ohkawa assisted Rintaro with the film's script.

The movie was directed by Rintaro, who previously directed the music video X^{2} based on the manga. He was requested by the editorial Kadokawa Shoten for unknown reasons, which he believes it was due to his work on Harmageddon, a 1983 film that employs different themes from the X manga. He aimed Asami Watanabi's script as a base to develop scenes of his liking. Based on the style he employed, Rintaro expected that multiple viewers would reject his work as the narrative gave Kamui a tragic ending which would impact people's personal taste. X was the first time Rintaro worked with Clamp which he found to be a unique experience. Since the manga was not finished, the script was made with Ohkawa's help to create a completely alternative story. He aimed the film to be a self-contained story and thus multiple subplots had to be removed from the source material. He often discussed this with Ohkawa who created the first script which Madhouse use to adapt. In retrospective, Rintaro is glad with how the movie was completed, specifically due to the focus on fight scenes. The film was written to be as simple as possible.

The characters were designed by Nobuteri Yuki while the music was produced by Yasuaki Shimizu. X was the first time Rintaro used computer animation in his career. The character Shogo Asagi was created exclusively to the movie. Kadokawa Shoten editor Seichiro Aoki supervised the film which gave a large surprise when learning that one of the characters was modeled after him but written in different Japanese characters. His job was also making sure the characters were nearly identical to manga's original style. Meanwhile, Clamp were asked for help by Rintaro who wanted to properly dress Karen.

The film was given a limited release in the United States in early 2000 and released to VHS and DVD on September 25, 2001, by Manga Entertainment. X: The Destiny War, a comic book based on the feature film, was released on September 30, 1996. The X Japan song "Forever Love", composed by Yoshiki, was chosen as the film's theme song. "Forever Love" also appears on the soundtrack of the film.

The X Character Files (キャラクターファイル, Kyarakutā Fairu) were released from June 1996 to December 1996 by Victor Entertainment. The seven audio dramas, scripted by Nanase Ohkawa, focus on the thoughts and motivations of the individual Dragons of Heaven and Earth. The Character Files are performed by the feature film voice actors. They were created to promote the film version of the manga.

== Reception ==
Released on March 10, 2000, in the United States, the film reached $143,355 at the box office. The song "Forever Love" was later used by the former Japanese Prime Minister Junichiro Koizumi in a campaign advertisement in 2001. According to Anime News Network, X Japan became popular worldwide thanks to their contribution to the X film. An alternate version of Shogo Asagi went to appear in Clamp's manga Tsubasa: Reservoir Chronicle as a gang leader who often encounters the series' protagonist, Syaoran, in the first story arc.

The X film is also notable to be the goriest adaptation of the manga, as, while television series is violent, it does not show massive genocide or decapitations like the film. Kamui is prophesied to return to Tokyo as one who will determine humanity's fate. The construction of Kamui as a messiah is reinforced by his miraculous birth and given name; "Kamui", like "Christ", alludes to the character's nature. Bamboo Dong from Anime News Network praised the Japanese cast, pointing out the lead Tomokazu Seki's role voicing Kamui due to how he displays the character's emotions. Dong considered it as a "masterpiece", in the technical, plot and character aspects. AnimeOnDVD writer Chris Beveridge praised the dialogue and audio provided by the English release. The felt that the dilemma between Kamui and Fuma being friends turned enemies was the most notable aspect of the narrative. He noted that the film was primarily a battle film and thus felt the plot was good, something he further noted during Rintaro's interview shown in the DVD. As a result, he awarded the DVD a "B+" THEM Anime Reviews called it a poor adaptation of Clamp's manga compare to the anime series, while the concept of a war destined to decide the planet's fate was interesting, it was difficult to care for the characters, based on the fact almost everybody is in danger in the film, regardless of well coordinated battles. As a result, THEM gave the film three stars out of five and recommended the viewers to skip it and instead watch the anime television series. Animerica was positive by how the drama focused on Kamui, Fuma and Kotori, finding it intense. He went to refer to it as a "surreal movie experience for both fans of the manga and those who have no idea what to expect." In comparison to the film, Zac Bertschy from Anime News Network felt that Fuma's transformation into the series' villain is more realistic in the anime series.

In the book Animation: A World History: Volume III: Contemporary Times, Giannalberto Bendazzi regarded X as one of Rintaro's "outstanding" works based on the visual presentations he created. Even though the abbreviated story did not place the characters' action in the proper context like the manga series, the film is praised for its dreamlike atmosphere; powerful imagery and visually engaging action sequences. The book Anime Classics Zettai!: 100 Must-See Japanese Animation Masterpieces noted that both the feature film and the anime television series provided attractive adaptations of Clamp's manga series, with the film achieving an appealing atmosphere based on the combination of animation and music while complimenting the character designs. The New York Times compared the film's animation to that of other popular anime films like Princess Mononoke (1997), Ghost in the Shell (1995) and Akira (1988) despite mentioning the amount of concentration needed to follow the complex narrative of the story.
