= X (manga) =

Japanese manga series and franchise

- First tankōbon volume cover
- Genre: Action; Dark fantasy; Supernatural thriller
- Manga
- Written by: Clamp
- Published by: Kadokawa Shoten
- English publisher: AUS: Madman Entertainment; NA: Viz Media
- Imprint: Asuka Comics
- Magazine: Monthly Asuka
- English magazine: NA: Animerica Extra
- Original run: May 1992 – March 2003 (on permanent hiatus)
- Volumes: 19 (Note: The remaining uncollected chapters following the hiatus were collected into "Volume 18.5", first released in the book All About Clamp. These were released as their own tankobon, "Volume 18.5", on 4 November 2023.)
- Anime
- 1996 film; 2001–02 TV series

X, also known as X/1999, is a Japanese manga series written and illustrated by Clamp, a manga artist group made up of Satsuki Igarashi, Nanase Ohkawa, Tsubaki Nekoi, and Mokona. It premiered in Kadokawa Shoten's shōjo manga magazine Monthly Asuka in May 1992 and ran there until it went on hiatus in March 2003; it has yet to be concluded. The story takes place at the end of days in the year 1999. The series follows Kamui Shiro, a young esper who returns home to Tokyo after a six-year absence to face his destiny as the one who will determine humanity's fate.

Kadokawa Shoten collected and published the individual chapters in 18 tankōbon volumes, with five chapters published in the book All About Clamp. These chapters were released in their own 19th volume, entitled "Volume 18.5", as part of a "Premium Collection" version of the series in November 2023. All but several final chapters have been published. It has been adapted into a series of audio dramas. It was followed by a 1996 anime feature film directed by Rintaro and assisted by Ohkawa in studio Madhouse. The same studio, led by director and writer Yoshiaki Kawajiri, made a 24-episode anime television series in 2001. Since the manga never reached its ending, the two animated adaptations have their own takes of the series' finale. Viz Media published the 18 completed volumes in North America, while the film and the TV series been have released on DVD by multiple distributors.

The series is a foray into apocalyptic fiction; it combines elements from various end-of-the-world scenarios, both secular and religious, with its own mythos. Its themes include exploring the personality of humanity, relationships with others, and external conflicts like the impending Armageddon. It is considered one of Clamp's most iconic works in their early career, having sold more than 12 million copies and garnering mostly positive reviews for its story, large varied cast and appealing illustrations. Despite its female target audience, it also attracted male readers because of its focus on action.

== Plot ==
In 1999, Kamui Shiro returns to Tokyo after a six-year absence to fulfill his mother's dying wish of changing fate. However, he keeps his distance from two childhood friends, Kotori and Fuma Monou, whom he originally treasured as a child. The end of the world is fast approaching as superhuman individuals will assure their victory. The clone Nataku steals the "Sacred Sword" (神剣, Shinken) from Fuma's family temple, with his dying father telling his son that he is Kamui's "twin star". The Dragons of Heaven are the first to contact Kamui. Hinoto, the dreamgazer for the Japanese Legislature guides them. They are the protectors of the kekkai (結界), spiritual barriers (in the form of buildings such as the Tokyo Tower) that hold the fabric of nature together. As long as the kekkai survive, Judgment Day is postponed. The Dragons of Earth are the antithesis of the Dragons of Heaven. Their mission is to destroy the kekkai and unleash earthquakes so Earth can be cured of the plague of humanity. They were assembled by Hinoto's sister Kanoe, secretary to the Governor of Tokyo.

Kamui is forced to choose between the two sides. He decides he only wants to protect Kotori and Fuma and becomes a Dragon of Heaven. At the same time, Fuma has a change of personality and becomes the "Kamui" of the Dragons of Earth as he was destined to be Kamui's opposite. Fuma murders Kotori and swears to kill Kamui. The Dragon of Heaven Subaru Sumeragi helps Kamui to overcome this traumatic experience, and he decides to face reality. Just like Subaru decided to search for the Dragon of Earth, Seishiro Sakurazuka, who killed his sister Hokuto years ago, Subaru inspires Kamui to face reality and avoid another catastrophe in his life. Kamui decides he wishes to bring Fuma back to normal. Kamui joins the Dragons of Heaven in their fight against the Dragons of Earth. Across the manga, Kamui and his allies face the Dragons of Earths multiple times but cannot protect most barriers, resulting in multiple earthquakes taking down Tokyo. In a one-on-one match, Seishiro activates Hokuto's dying spell so that Subaru would be forced kill him. Fuma reveals that Seishiro's wish was leaving a mark in Subaru. Following an eye transplant from Seishiro's body, Subaru replaces the late Dragon of Earth. The Dragon of Heaven Arashi Kishu loses her maiden powers after having a sexual relationship with her ally Sorata Arisugawa. A dark alter ego Hinoto kidnaps her to turn her into a Dragon of Earth. As these events occur, Tokyo has nearly been destroyed and is flooded, and Kamui and Fuma wield their Sacred Swords needed to clash in the final fight of the war. Both Subaru and Fuma claim that Kamui cannot change the future unless he realizes his own wish.

== Production ==
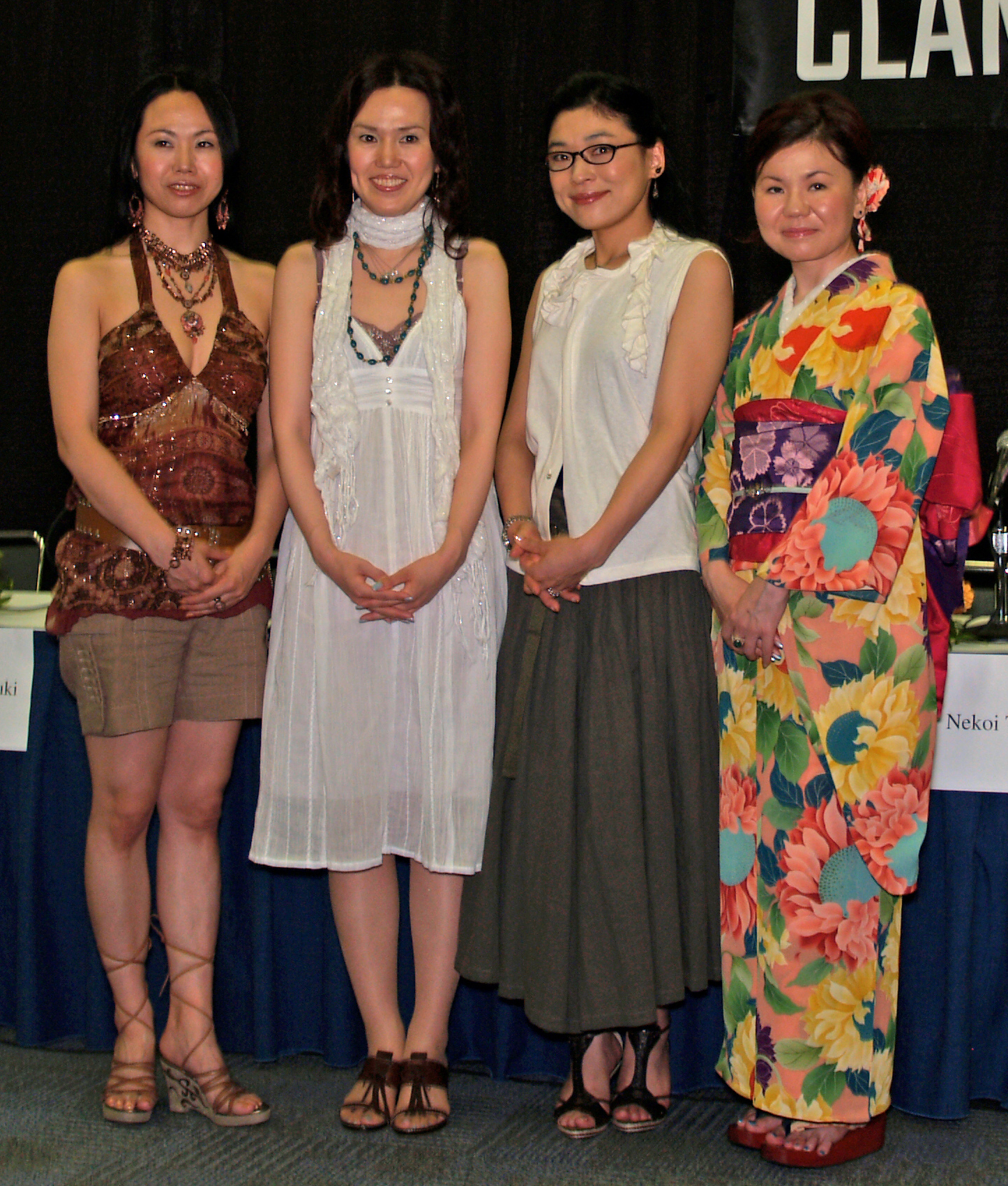
The four Clamp artists (from left to right): Satsuki Igarashi, Nanase Ohkawa, Mick Nekoi, and Mokona Apapa created X

=== Development ===
The manga artist group Clamp created X. Influenced by the works of Go Nagai and Kyokutei Bakin, the story develops the group's ideas on humanity's responsibility to itself; its family and the planet. After the success of Tokyo Babylon and Clamp School Detectives, their editor at Monthly Asuka, Seiichiro Aoki, approached the members of Clamp to script a longer series. Writer Nanase Ohkawa, the group's head writer, seized the opportunity to script her long-in-development "end of the world" epic. Conceived while she was still in middle school, Ohkawa's original story focused on a group of warriors fighting a losing battle in the name of justice. While the idea never materialized, many aspects were carried over into Clamp's manga, including the lead characters of Kamui and Fuma. Kamui was originally written as a high-school student from Kotori Monou's point of view to appeal to the shōjo audience of young females. However, poor response from readers led to Clamp changing their characterizations. Ohkawa aimed to show characters from their previous works in the X resulting in multiple crossovers. The title—"X"—was chosen because it has no fixed meaning. In mathematics, it is a common variable. Beyond mathematics, "X" is a generic placeholder whose value is secret or unknown. "X" is also a cruciform, an allusion to Christian mythos, and the representation of death and rebirth in Kabbalah.

Ohkawa cites Go Nagai's Devilman as a stylistic and thematic influence. Beyond his penchant for drawing extreme violence, Nagai's writing involves themes like the nature of good and evil and fear, ideas that left an impression on Clamp's writer at an early age. Like Devilman, X follows two male best friends destined to fight each other at Armageddon, a confrontation brought about by the murder of the hero's childhood sweetheart. The rest of the cast includes characters from the group's entire canon, including unpublished works, effectively creating an entire world inhabited by their creations. The ensemble cast, inspired on Kyokutei Bakin's Nansō Satomi Hakkenden, includes Subaru Sumeragi and Seishiro Sakurazuka from Tokyo Babylon, and the main characters of Clamp School Detectives. Their first illustration of Kamui gave them a feeling of Ashura, a character from RG Veda based on his appearance in Tokyo's destroyed area.

Several of the series' characters were created using Osamu Tezuka's "Star System" technique, where old designs are incorporated in new characters, except for Kamui, who proved challenging because of his role. He was made to stand apart from other characters, and Ohkawa called his hairstyle and school uniform average. Clamp's lead artist Mokona believes this was influenced by the heroic character-type upon which he was based. In contrast, Kamui and Fuma were new characters whose designs were revised to fit their characters. Subaru and Seishiro reappear in Clamp's manga X because their relationship parallels that of the lead Kamui and the main antagonist Fuma. They serve as an example to Kamui and Fuma. One of X's most important plot developments is the question of what these two will do, so as not end up like Subaru and Seishiro. Clamp has compared the bond between Subaru and Kamui with that of siblings. The fight sequences were inspired by the manga Dragon Ball, most specifically by author Akira Toriyama's use of white backgrounds.

=== Influences ===
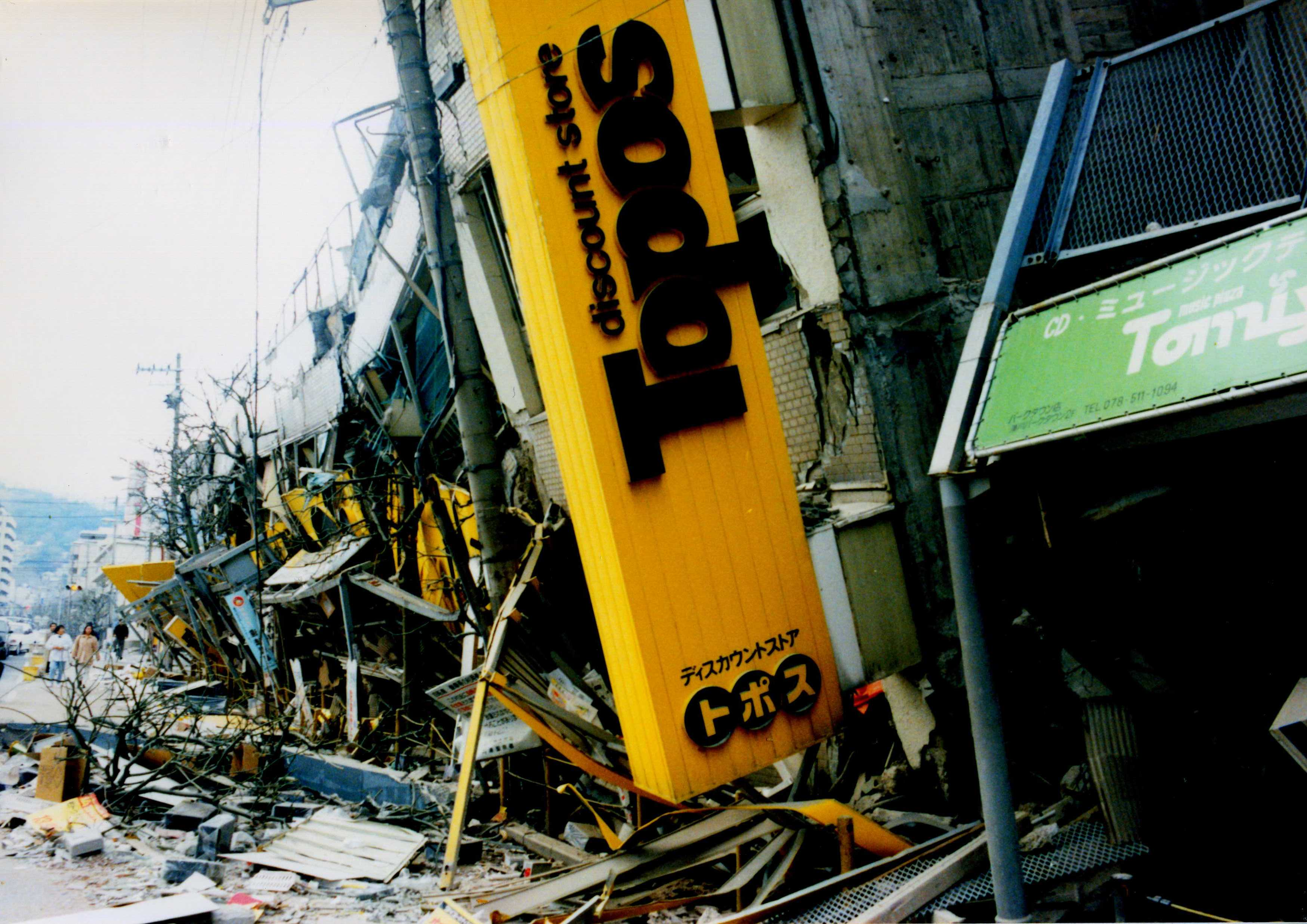
Multiple incidents such as the Great Hanshin earthquake caused the hiatus of X due to its similarities with the earthquakes from X.

X is Clamp's take on the apocalyptic fiction genre. The series combines elements from various end of the world scenarios and myths, including Christian eschatology; with Clamp's own modern mythology to tell the tale of the fate of the world. The Apocalypse of John inspires the X mythos with Tokyo standing in as a modern-day Babylon. Like the biblical city; Clamp's Tokyo is "the habitation of devils, and the hold of every foul spirit, and a cage of every unclean and hateful bird", (Rev. 18:2 KJV) and is slated for destruction.

Clamp found issues with the amount of gore they aimed to portray, especially Kotori's death foreshadowed in dream scenes. This was mostly affected by the concern over themes of violence in video games present in the 1990s. The writers feared that toning down the violence would negatively affect the manga. Another death scene that left Clamp facing issues was when Fuma decapitates Saiki, which led to more negative responses from the readers. Ohkawa claimed the deaths were meant to be cruel, but the narrative did not fit the shojo demography. The Kobe child murders where Clamp received criticism for the similarities between fictional murders and real life murders also had an effect.

Kamui is established as a Christ figure. He is prophesied to return to Tokyo and the one who will determine humanity's fate. His miraculous birth and his given name reinforce the construction of Kamui as a messiah. "Kamui", like "Christ", doubles as a title that alludes to the character's nature. Apocalyptic allusions abound with respect to nomenclature. The Dragons of Heaven take their moniker from the seven seals introduced in Chapter 5 of the Book of Revelation, while the antagonistic Angels allude to the seven celestial beings ordered to "go [their] ways, and pour out the vials of the wrath of God upon the earth" (Rev. 16:1 KJV).

Other apocalyptic standards like earthquakes are employed, but the apocalypse of Clamp's manga trades the religious element for an environmental theme. Inspired by the Gaia theory that the Earth itself is one living organism, Ohkawa crafts an endtime brought on by humanity's abuse of the planet. The constant earthquakes the Dragons of Earth cause resulted in a negative backlash from readers and editors because of similar incidents in real life. The story reflects environmental concerns in its depiction of Judgment Day. Mankind exists in binary opposition to the Earth. By the end of days, humanity has become such a nuisance that the only way to save the planet is to destroy the whole of civilization. With mankind gone, the planet can regulate itself back to health and experience a rebirth. The Seals, however, look to preserve the status quo and to entrust the future of the planet to the people. Teito Monogatari, an award-winning historical fantasy novel, inspired aspects of X's mythology.

=== Themes ===
The conflict between the Dragons of Heaven and the Dragons of Earth is at the heart of the series. Like its predecessor Tokyo Babylon, X deals with societal issues. Being set in the present provides an outlet for the authors to reflect and comment on Japan's state of affairs. But unlike Tokyo Babylon, where the characters were vocal in their concerns, topics in X go unspoken and are implied. The story places an emphasis on familial dignity and individualism. X delves into the relationship between Man and the Earth. Ohkawa talks of how mankind's concern for the preservation, restoration and improvement of the planet stems from a desire to perpetuate its own existence. She explains, "people will save the Earth to save themselves, but who will risk themselves to save the Earth"?

X plays out like a tragedy, where the characters are at the mercy of forces greater than themselves. The series shares some motifs with apocalyptic literature, like the disclosure of future events through dreams; and establishes a dual nature to its characters and concepts. Ohkawa admits to being fascinated with the doctrine of Dualism. Dualism is the interdependence between opposing elements, the generalization that two opposing-complementary forces are found in all things. She interprets it as "qualities that seem pleasant in one person but can make you hate the next. That's the dual nature we all have." Inspired by the works of Go Nagai, Ohkawa sought to create heroes capable of wrongdoing, even evil. Kamui is the personification of this doctrine. His name (神威, Kamui) carries a double connotation: "the one who represents the majesty of God", meaning the one who protects the world and carries out God's will; and "the one who hunts the majesty of God", meaning the one who kills those given God's power and destroys the world. Kamui's decision to save the world as he knows it is a defining moment as it gives rise to his twin star, Fuma. Fuma undergoes a personality change to the point he is no longer recognizable to his best friend. He takes the name of "Kamui", thus fulfilling the dual prophecy and bringing balance to the conflict. Fuma's "Kamui" persona is Kamui's other half; it represents Kamui's potential for destruction. "Kamui" is the epitome of the evil and good that men do. The duality motif extends to the Dragons of Heaven and Earth, two groups of warriors, both alike in power, led to battle by opposite sisters.

Dreams are a source of inspiration for Ohkawa; and became a standard motif in her writing. Dreams in X depict the future, the destruction of mankind. Hinoto, dreamgazer for the Dragons of Heaven, is convinced it can be changed. Ohkawa explains it as lucid dreaming, where the individual can exert conscious control over the dream to the point it can perform impossible feats. Kakyo of the Dragons of Earth is a dreamgazer in a permanent coma who lives in the dreamscape, always dreaming of the future and knowing there is nothing he can do about it. Although he hopes for a better future, he cannot get involved and is convinced everything is predetermined, including Kamui's return.

By arriving in Tokyo, Kamui unwillingly sets Armageddon in motion. Kotori's death and Fuma's turning were foretold, but subject to the young man's allegiance. Thinking of the people he loves, Kamui chooses to become a Dragon of Heaven to protect them, but ends up losing them for it. Other characters are also at the mercy of fate. Sorata Arisugawa is destined to die for a woman; but, unlike Kamui, the warrior monk embraces his preordained future and chooses Arashi Kishu of the Dragons of Heaven as the one for whom he will give his life. Subaru Sumeragi expresses no interest in the future of the Earth, still he and his counterpart, Seishiro Sakurazuka, are drawn to Tokyo on the Promised Day. Even with the fatalist atmosphere that persists in the series, Ohkawa is convinced individuals exert control over their destiny the same way they choose between right and wrong.

== Media ==
Besides changes to the cover of each volume, Viz Media altered the title X to X/1999 in its initial printing.

=== Manga ===
X began serialization in Kadokawa Shoten's shōjo manga magazine Monthly Asuka in May 1992. Publishing the series proved troublesome because of its subject matter, which depicted material unintentionally reminiscent of real events in Japan. The series went on hiatus multiple times during its serialization in response to social incidents, including the Great Hanshin earthquake in 1995 and the Kobe child murders in 1997. Serialization ceased in March 2003, after the editorial staff at Monthly Asuka indicated to Clamp that Kadokawa Shoten was unlikely to publish their planned ending to the series. Clamp declined to revise the ending, and serialization of X stopped in March 2003. In March 2005, Clamp stated that they were still interested in formally concluding the story.

The published chapters were collected in eighteen tankōbon volumes, with the first one released on 29 July 1992, and the eighteenth on 17 September 2002. On 26 September 2006, Kadokawa Shoten published Clamp Newtype Platinum, a special Clamp edition of the magazine Newtype. The issue includes the "X 18.5" supplement, a re-print of five previously uncollected chapters. The series was expected to reach twenty-one volumes upon completion. The "X 18.5" chapters were later released as part of the book All About Clamp on 22 October 2009. They were released as their own nineteenth tankōbon volume, entitled "Volume 18.5", on 4 November 2023.

The North American version of the manga, retitled X/1999 in its initial printing, was serialized in Viz Media's Animerica Extra and released under the Shōjo imprint. The magazine noted that during its initial volumes, there were issues with the handling of the series as the manga went on a hiatus with its sixth volume. In July 2001, Viz Media removed the series from Animerica Extra because of licensing issues, but it later returned in its March 2003 issue. Viz Media released the eighteen completed volumes, ending in 2005. Beginning in 2011, Viz re-issued the series in North America as three-in-one volumes, unflipped, titled X. In Australia, the series is licensed by Madman Entertainment.

=== Music video ===
On 21 November 1993, SME Records released X^{2} (ダブルエックス, Daburu Ekkusu), pronounced "Double-X" in English, a short film based on Clamp's manga, set to the music of rock band X Japan. X^{2} features a slideshow of X artwork set to a medley of X Japan's songs: "Silent Jealousy," "Kurenai", and "Endless Rain" with the "X" music video directed by Shigeyuki Hayashi.

=== Feature film ===
The X feature film, directed by Rintaro and co-scripted by Nanase Ohkawa, premiered in Japan on 3 August 1996. Rintaro is not certain but believes Kadokawa Shoten's editors asked him to do the film because of his work on Harmageddon, a 1983 film that employs different themes from the X manga. The supernatural thriller focuses on the roles Kamui, Kotori, and Fuma play in the Apocalypse. The film was given a limited release in the United States in early 2000 and released to DVD on 25 September 2001. X: The Destiny War, a comic book based on the feature film, was released on 30 September 1996. The X Japan song "Forever Love", composed by Yoshiki, was chosen as the film's theme song; and was later used by the former Japanese prime minister Junichiro Koizumi in a campaign advertisement in 2001.

Victor Entertainment released the X Character Files (キャラクターファイル, Kyarakutā Fairu) from June 1996 to December 1996. The seven audio dramas, scripted by Nanase Ohkawa, focus on the thoughts and motivations of the individual Dragons of Heaven and Earth. The feature film's voice actors perform the Character Files. They were created to promote the film.

=== TV series ===
Yoshiaki Kawajiri directed the episodes from the X anime television series, which was first announced on 18 October 2000. Kawajiri aimed to portray Kamui and Kotori as stronger than their manga counterparts. However, he still wanted to highlight their psychological weaknesses across later episodes. In anticipation of the series' premiere, X: An Omen (エックス - 前兆, Ekkusu - Yochō) was released direct-to-DVD on 25 August 2001. Written and directed by Kawajiri, An Omen tells the story of the upcoming battles through the prophecies of Kakyō Kuzuki, dreamgazer for the Dragon of Earth, and acts as a primer for viewers unfamiliar with Clamp's manga. The series premiered 3 October 2001 on WOWOW satellite television and finished on 27 March 2002, totaling twenty-four episodes. Twelve DVD volumes from the series, each containing two episodes were released in Japan from 25 February 2002 to 25 January 2003 by Bandai Visual. Naoki Satō composed the series' music; two original soundtracks were released.

Pioneer Entertainment distributed the series in North America in March 2002. Geneon collected the series and the OVA in eight DVD volumes released between 24 September 2002 and 25 November 2003. Two DVD box sets of the series were also released on 11 January 2005. In 2006, Geneon released the X TV Series Re-Mix, on five individual DVDs released between 11 July 2006 and 14 November 2006, as well as a DVD box set on 11 July 2006. The DVDs came with re-mastered video and audio, including remastered and remixed 5.1 Dolby Digital AC3 surround sound for both the Japanese and English tracks. In September 2009, Funimation announced that it had acquired the rights to the anime series and OVA. They were re-released in a DVD box set on 15 June 2010 using the original Geneon dubbing (provided by Bang Zoom! Entertainment) for the English-language audio track. It is licensed by Siren Visual in Australia, and MVM Films in the United Kingdom.

=== Video games ===
Two video games were developed:

- X: Unmei no Sentaku (X ~運命の選択~, lit. X: Fateful Choice) is a fighting game developed by Arc System Works and published by Namco for the PlayStation on 22 August 2002. The features a story mode, set in the television series continuity, and a versus mode, which allows players to compete against each other using any of the Dragons of Heaven or Earth. The game was not released outside Japan and it has two different endings.
- X: Card of Fate, a card battle video game for the WonderSwan Color, was released on 27 June 2002.

== Reception ==
=== Popularity ===
The X manga series was a commercial success in Japan, with over 12 million copies in circulation; while in North America it often appeared on The New York Times Manga Best Sellers of 2012 and ICv2 lists.

=== Critical reception ===
The manga's plot and cast were praised. Animerica regarded it as one of Clamp's most iconic works from their early career. According to the site, "Part of the appeal of the X manga series is its surreal blend of Taoist, Shinto, and even European mysticism with real-world locales and historical landmarks familiar to Japanese fans." According to Anime Nation, X "appears to defy the conventions of "boys' manga" and "girls' manga" because of multiple features provided by the authors such as violence and romance that will appeal to many types of reader. Anime News Network noted that while there are no explicit homosexual relationships, the shōjo appeal might give the reader this impression when the male characters interact, something the shônen demographic might not like.

Sequental Tart found Kamui's identity mysterious; he is featured as a caring child to Kotori Monou in a flashback, but he appears as a rude teenager when meeting her again. His fight scenes were noted to be violent in contrast to the lighthearted moments that seem to work as comic relief. As a result, the reviewer said that it is difficult to analyze the series' first volume. Comic Book Bin said that despite the aspects of the work and the way the subplots are handled, X still maintains an interesting narrative. As the manga progressed, the reviewer felt the manga became more polished and looked forward to the climax when it is written. Kamui's growing character arc was the subject of a positive mention as Manga News also enjoyed his early appearances and the formation of the Dragons of Heaven as they befriend each other. Reviewers felt Fuma Monou is one of the most brutal antagonists of Clamp's career and in shōjo in general because of this gruesome murder of Kotori and how he then causes earthquakes to destroy Tokyo. Anime News Network found that the series had many types of characters for Dragons of Heaven and Dragons of Earth that are given enough screen time in the buildup to the Holy War to interact and fight until the manga's eighth volume when the narrative takes a different route. As the second half begins, the same website also noted that the narrative becomes progressively darker because of the number of dead characters as Clamp moves the plot towards the Armageddon; they also mentioned the events that causes all the deaths.

Fans reading the series have wondered whether Clamp was hinting at a romantic relationship between Kamui and Fuma. Sequental Art commented on homoerotic tones during a few scenes. In response, in the book Understanding Manga and Anime writer Robin E. Brenner claims Clamp had no intention of suggesting a romantic relationship between the two as he compared them with the more explicit relationship Subaru had with Seishiro. Manga News noted the pair had one of the most anticipated fights in the series because of the long history they have in Tokyo Babylon and called their final duel tragic. In Manga: The Complete Guide, Jason Thompson wrote "even without a proper ending, the series has a lot going for it", and felt the major storytelling centering around destiny was appealing despite not finding it Clamp's best strength.

Clamp's illustrations such as the dream sequences, Seishiro's horror-based spells, and the outstanding designs of Kamui and Hinoto were also the subject of praise. The Fandom Post also enjoyed the artwork, mostly praising the way action sequences are drawn Manga News found the early artwork of the series like Clamp's other works, such as RG Veda and Tokyo Babylon but with a different style than Angelic Layer and Cardcaptor Sakura as it features mostly androgynous characters. Comic Book Bin praised the handling of the fight scenes by the artists especially the backgrounds, which "depict energy and magic unleashed in a fast and furious display". Because of the manga's long serialization, critics noted that the artwork evolved, making it as appealing as later Clamp works like Tsubasa: Reservoir Chronicle and Angelic Layer. However, Anime News Network felt the violent imagery portrayed by Clamp throughout earthquakes and murder scenes in X was too disturbing for the Monthly Asuka demographic and cancelled it. Although the manga returned following its controversial cancellation, the planned ending was even more gruesome causing its cancellation again. Thompson simply regarded the art as "absolutely gorgeous".
