= Seishiro Sakurazuka =

Fictional character from Tokyo Babylon and X

- Tokyo Babylon and X character
- Seishiro Sakurazuka as illustrated by Clamp. The removal of his glasses are meant to reflect between his caring persona and his original persona.
- First appearance: Tokyo Babylon (1990)
- Created by: Clamp
- Voiced by: Japanese: Takehito Koyasu (Tokyo Babylon); Tōru Furusawa (X feature film); Otoya Kawano (X TV series); Hiroki Tōchi (Tsubasa: Reservoir Chronicle); Yūichirō Umehara (Tokyo Babylon 2021); English: Dean Fenton (Tokyo Babylon); Garrick Hagon (X feature film); Dave Mallow (X TV series); J. Michael Tatum (Tsubasa: Reservoir Chronicle)
- Portrayed by: Shihodo Wataru (Tokyo Babylon 1999)

In-universe information
- Alias: The Sakurazukamori
- Gender: Male
- Occupation: Assassin; Veterinarian (cover job); Vampire hunter (in Tsubasa: Reservoir Chronicle)
- Weapon: Ofuda
- Significant other: Subaru Sumeragi
- Relatives: Setsuka Sakurazuka (mother)

Seishiro Sakurazuka (Japanese: 桜塚 星史郎, Hepburn: Sakurazuka Seishirō; November 22, 1965 - c. 1999) is a fictional character that was created by Clamp and first appeared in the manga series Tokyo Babylon. He appears as a kind veterinarian who shows romantic affection for the young exorcist (referred as onmyōji) Subaru Sumeragi. During the story, it is revealed he is the Sakurazukamori (桜塚護; lit. "Cherry Blossom burial mound guardian"), Japan's number-one assassin who is targeting Subaru. The character returns in the apocalyptic manga X as a combatant in the battle of Armageddon, a Dragon of Earth and Subaru's rival. An alternative version of Seishiro appears in Clamp's crossover series Tsubasa: Reservoir Chronicle as a young treasure hunter who is searching for two vampires, one of whom is an alternative version of Subaru.

Seishiro was created alongside Subaru and his twin sister Hokuto as the main characters for a dōjinshi novel. After undergoing major changes, he was used as a main character in Tokyo Babylon. Multiple actors voiced the character in animated adaptations of the manga. Since his introduction in Tokyo Babylon, publications for manga and anime have received Seishiro favorably for his relationship with Subaru, which became one of the most famous rivalries in X. His role in Tsubasa: Reservoir Chronicle also received positive responses for his action scenes and connections with the protagonist Syaoran.

== Creation and concept ==
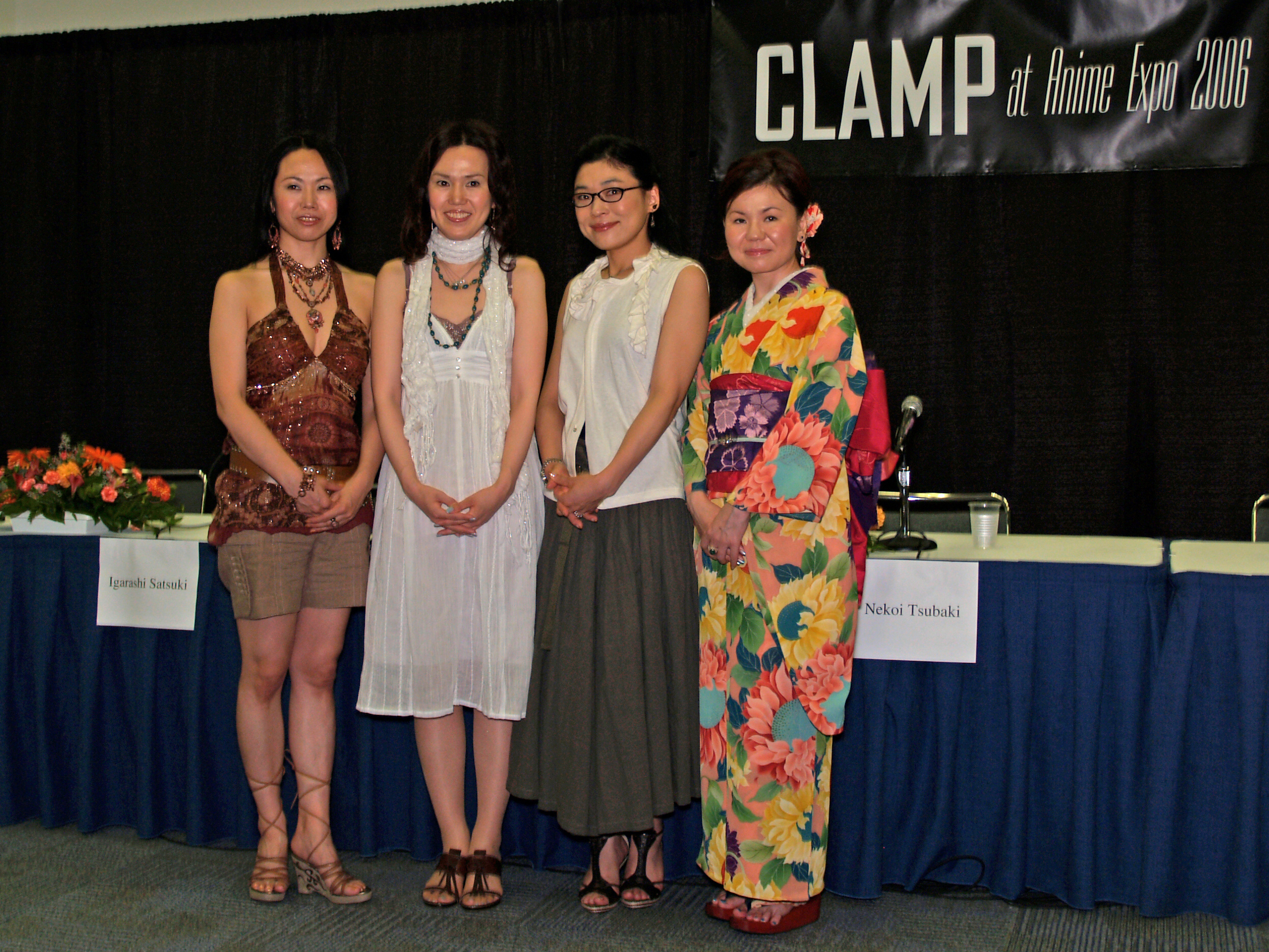
The four Clamp artists (from left to right): Satsuki Igarashi, Nanase Ohkawa, Mick Nekoi, and Mokona Apapa created Seishiro

Seishiro, with twin characters Subaru and Hokuto, were created by series creator Nanase Ohkawa for a dōjinshi novel about an onmyōji who hunts elves. The characters were twice drawn for covers; these characters were used when South magazine asked Clamp to create a new series for them. In the dōjinshi, Seishiro was a veterinarian but his dark side was much less pronounced. Seishiro underwent more changes from this early design to the creation of Tokyo Babylon. Seishiro was easier to write than Subaru by Ohkawa as she has more skill with coldhearted characters like Seishiro's true persona than the kind Subaru. In the dōjinshi, Seishiro had a conjure being accompanying him (shikigami) which was named Nandaro ("Just what is this?"). Clamp privately referred to it by this name during the publication of the series despite it not being mentioned in the manga. According to Yasunori Katō, Subaru and Seishiro's respective designs pay homage to this character and the protagonist of the fantasy novel Teito Monogatari, who is widely credited with starting the "onmyōji boom" in Japan. The early chapters involving Subaru's meeting with Seishiro set the events of the series' future. Since his introduction, Seishiro has been written with the idea of having an agendum that contrasts with his actions and dialogue with the other characters. When designing Seishiro, Clamp wanted a strong contrast between his facade as a caring man and his cruel persona whenever he is wearing glasses. The Clamp News 2 newsletter lists Seishiro's birth as taking place in Kanazawa at 6am on November 22, 1965.

When production of Tokyo Babylon was finished, film director George Iida asked Clamp to help with a sequel movie in which Subaru and Seishiro would clash again. Because of production issues, the characters' interactions were reduced and were used only in an audio drama. To promote the movie, Mokona drew illustrations of both characters. Subaru and Seishiro appear in X because their relationship parallels those of Kamui Shiro and Fuma Monou. A common theme involves the series' fate; Subaru expresses no interest in the future of the Earth, but he and his counterpart are still drawn to Tokyo on the Promised Day. As a result, a fatalistic atmosphere persists in the series. Ohkawa found Seishiro to be childish because he only deals with what appeals to him; in contrast, Ohkawa found Fuma more adult-like. In the sixteenth volume of the series, the rivalry between the two ended with Seishiro's death; according to Clamp Seishiro's death is permanent and he would not return in future chapters.

In Tsubasa: Reservoir Chronicle, Clamp originally intended Subaru to be the mentor of the protagonist, Syaoran, while searching for Seishiro. However, they ended replacing him with Seishiro to avoid repeating the same pattern Tokyo Babylon and X had regarding these two characters.

=== Voice actors ===
In the Tokyo Babylon original video animation, Seishiro was first voiced by Takehito Koyasu, who was replaced by Tōru Furusawa for the 1996 film X. Otoya Kawano took the role in the television adaptation. Hiroki Tōchi played Seishiro in Tsubasa: Reservoir Chronicle, and the character will be voiced by Yūichirō Umehara in the television series Tokyo Babylon 2021.

In English, Seishiro was first voiced by Dean Fenton in Tokyo Babylon, by Garrick Hagon in the feature film X, Dave Mallow in the X television series, and J. Michael Tatum in Tsubasa.

== Characterization and themes ==
In Clamp no Kiseki, the writers described the character's past with Subaru revealed in flashback foreshadow an important event in his life. As Seishiro constantly mentions his one-sided affections towards him, Subaru often notices he also cares about him. Due to the dark nature Seishiro hides from Subaru, the two can be regarded as the yin and yang as the former contrasts his the latter's kind self even when interacting about his job. Subaru's hidden romantic feelings towards Seishiro become obvious as the manga progresses as he becomes astonished when Seishiro keep profressing his love towards him. Although Subaru and Seishiro are written as rivals, illustrations from the X series tend to show the bond the two had. Clamp believes the red thread of fate they share in an image was drawn in a forced manner in restrospect. Despite his calm demeanor, Seishiro becomes confused when Fuma Monou explains to Seishiro that Subaru's true wish isn't what he thinks, hinting that Seishiro is still interested in Subaru. When Seishiro dies in battle, Fuma offers Subaru to transplant Seishiro' lost eye to Subaru. Clamp wrote it in a way so the bond between Subaru and Seishiro will never be destroyed.

== Appearances ==
=== Tokyo Babylon ===
In Tokyo Babylon, Seishiro is a veterinarian who is working in Shinjuku, Tokyo. He meets 16-year-old Subaru Sumeragi, Japan's most powerful onmyōji, after Subaru's shikigami causes an unlikely meeting between the two at Ikebukuro railroad station. Seishiro and Subaru begin a year-long courtship; Seishiro often professes his love for Subaru, whose eccentric twin sister Hokuto enthusiastically supports the pairing, much to Subaru's embarrassment. Seishiro protects Subaru on several occasions, even sacrificing his right eye to protect Subaru from a knife-wielding attacker.

After a year passes, Subaru realizes his love for Seishiro, who reveals himself to be the assassin the Sakurazukamori, who was supposed to kill Subaru. Impressed with Subaru's purity, Seishiro made a bet in which, if Seishiro comes to love Subaru after living with him for a year, he would spare Subaru's life. Seishiro almost kills Subaru but Subaru's grandmother intervenes and free hims from the illusion, leaving herself crippled. Seishiro disappears from Subaru's life; Hokuto, fearing he will come after her brother, offers up her own life in Subaru's place. Seishiro accepts Hokuto's offer and stabs her through the heart.

=== Tokyo Babylon 1999 ===
In the 1993 live-action sequel to Clamp's manga, Tokyo Babylon 1999, Seishiro is portrayed by Shihodo Wataru. The Sakurazukamori assassinates a former enemy of the Sumeragi clan but his signature hand-through-the-chest style of killing is replaced with magical strangulation. When targeting the same criminals as Subaru, the former friends engage each others in battle. The spirit of Hokuto possesses one of the girls Seishiro aimed to kill. Hokuto then asks the two of them to drop their fight which results in Subaru losing his newfound hatred towards Seishiro.

=== X ===
In the manga X, Seishiro returns to Tokyo to assume his place as one of the Dragons of Earth, warriors who are destined to fight the Dragons of Heaven and eliminate mankind. Following the loss of his right eye in Tokyo Babylon, Seishiro now wears a pair of sunglasses instead of normal glasses to conceal his damaged eye. He tries to kill the Dragons of Heavens but their leader Kamui Shiro destroys his illusions. In a later encounter with Kamui, Seishiro retreats when a Fuma Monou accidentally stops his powers using his unknown talent. In his role as a Dragon of Earth, Seishiro destroys the Nakano Sun Plaza, starting an earthquake. He encounters an adult Subaru and briefly fights him. Seishiro befriends Fuma, the new leader of the Dragons of Earth. Seishiro observes a fight between his new ally and Subaru which ends with the former's victory while Subaru loses an eye in a similar manner as him. Shortly afterwards, Fuma contacts Seishiro and tells him he is the only one who can grant Subaru's true wish and it is not what Seishiro believes.

Seishiro encounters Subaru at Tokyo's Rainbow Bridge for a final fight. As Seishiro deals his final blow, Hokuto's dying spell she performed in the finale of Tokyo Babylon was triggered. This results in Subaru with his hand through Seishiro's chest, killing him. Hokuto's final wish was that Subaru could not be killed by and told the mechanic of her spell Seishiro in her last moments that she has faith in him that he would not kill her brother. As Subaru confesses that his true wish was existing in Seishiro's mind even through death, Seishiro smiles kindly to Subaru and says unknown words before dying. Some time after the battle, Fuma finds the remains of Seishiro's corpse and offers Subaru to transfer the remaining intact eye. As Subaru questions Fuma, he reveals that Seishiro wished to erase Fuma's trace on Subaru, from their previous battle which he saw. After regaining his full sight, Subaru becomes the 14th Sakurazukamori and a Dragon of Earth.

In a sidestory of the series, Seishiro becomes the Sakurazukamori by killing his mother, Setsuka. As she dies in his arms, she tells him he will also be killed by the person he loves.

=== Tsubasa: Reservoir Chronicle ===
In the crossover manga Tsubasa: Reservoir Chronicle, Seishiro is a young traveler who gained the power to travel between worlds from the witch Yuko Ichihara in exchange for his right eye. He searches for the vampire twins Kamui and Subaru and is a treasure hunter like his younger brother Fuma. Although the reason for searching the vampire twins is unknown, Kamui states he will kill Seishiro if he finds them. Seishiro possesses one of magical feathers of young girl named Sakura, one of the series' protagonists. This allows him to summon oni to fight for him and modify them into reshapable swords.

Seishiro, who is an experienced fighter, teaches the dimension traveler Syaoran his kicking techniques. Seishiro grows happy with his development, but tries to kill Syaoran in Oto Country when searching for clues about the vampires. When visiting Japan to find the vampires' location, Seishiro is challenged by the other Syaoran, who wishes to obtain his feather. In the course of the battle, Syaoran claims the feather, although Fūma says this was his main aim from the start. Seishiro leaves Japan to continue his search and is seen in the epilogue alongside his brother and the vampires.

== Reception ==
Seishiro has been well received by publications for manga and anime. In the first character-popularity poll for Tsubasa: Reservoir Chronicle, Seishiro was voted the sixth-most popular character from the series. Mania Entertainment and the Fandom Post enjoyed his debut for lighthearted personality and love projected towards Subaru. His role in the OVAs was praised as it would attract older fans from X as by the release of the OVA, X was more common in Western territories than Tokyo Babylon and thus Seishiro was further explored. For the manga's finale, Manga Bookshelf writers were surprised by Seishiro's betrayal of Subaru, which contrasts with other stories in which a traitor would redeem himself; the reviewers also questioned Seishiro's motivations in the past. The character's relationship with Seishiro stood out with novelist Yoshiki Tanaka calling it tragic and striking. Meanwhile, in the book Manga: The Complete Guide, Jason Thompson says the manga is famous in the West for being one of the first portrayals of a homosexual relationship, comparing Subaru and Seishiro with the seme and uke couple.

Critics also commented on the character's return in X; Sequentalart praised his first fight against Kamui and for the way Clamp illustrates Seishiro's spells, while Manga News felt his friendship with Fuma while causing an earthquake make the duo look as striking villain. Multiple writers called Seishiro one of the best villains in X based on Tokyo Babylon development and his final confrontation with Subaru based on its tragic elements, making it one of the best fights. In regards to Seishiro's history, Robin E. Brenner said in the book Understanding Manga and Anime, his bond is one of the most explicit in X, and that the romantic feelings between these two male characters are uncommon in Western stories. Brenner stated Seishiro's unheard last words were meant to force readers to interpret them themselves, which is characteristic of manga series. Manga News claimed despite the tragic ending of Seishiro and Subaru, the latter obtains hope to live when learning that Seishiro's last wish was to give Subaru his eye to replace his blind one. In regards to Seisiro's role in Rintaro's 1996 movie, EWric Luce of EX said viewers who have not read Tokyo Babylon would not understand Subaru's vendetta against Seishiro and that they kill each other quickly in the movie's initial scenes.

Critics also commented on Seishiro's alternate persona from the manga Tsubasa: Reservoir Chronicle. Manga News liked his role in Tsubasa because of his teacher-student relationship with the young Syaoran, the imposing manner he adopts, and that the character is more fully explored in this story arc. Seishiro's fight against the original Syaoran was praised for balancing the amount of exposition on which the narrative relies with the foreshadowing of other events. According to Excite, because multiple voice actors have portrayed Seishiro, fans of the character have multiple favorites and that for the 2021 anime adaptation of Tokyo Babylon, many fans are looking forward to the character's new voice.
