= Tōru Furusawa =

Japanese actor (born 1962)

- 古澤 融
- Born: Tōru Furusawa (古澤 徹); August 3, 1962 (age 64); Iwagami-machi, Maebashi, Gunma Prefecture, Japan
- Other name: Tetsu (てつ)
- Occupations: Voice actor; stage actor; theater director
- Years active: 1980–present
- Agent: Low Notes
- Spouse: 1
- Children: 1
- Website: Low Notes profile

Tōru Furusawa (古澤 徹, Furusawa Tōru; born August 3, 1962), known professionally as Tōru Furusawa (古澤 融, Furusawa Tōru), is a Japanese voice actor, stage actor, and theater director of the Rlung Fu-Run- theater company affiliated with Low Notes.

== Biography ==
Born in a Tokyo Electric Power Company company housing in Iwagami-machi, Maebashi, Gunma Prefecture, he resided there until the second year of junior high school, though some sources claim Kumamoto Prefecture as his birthplace.

He graduated from Maebashi City Iwagami Elementary School, Maebashi City Daisan Junior High School, Gunma Prefectural Shibukawa High School, and the Department of Political Science in the School of Political Science and Economics at Meiji University.

He got into acting in high school when the head of the drama club scouted him.

After attending the 11th class of the Seinenza Theater Institute and the En Theater Research Institute, he joined the Gekidan Nakama.

Back then, he struggled to get by. With nothing but rehearsals and performances, he didn't even have time for a part-time job, so he snuck into a subcontracting company working for Shimizu Corporation, where actors from the Seinenza Theater Company would routinely go to do part-time work. However, at the site, he fell from the scaffolding, tearing the anterior cruciate ligament in his right knee and suffered a meniscus tear. At that time, remembering that his close friend Tomoyuki Dan had said, "Lately I started a well-paying part-time job as a voice actor," he cried to Dan, who then introduced him to Kazuya Tatekabe. Tatekabe watched Furusawa's performance at The Suzunari Theatre and judged, "He seems capable enough of acting, so I suppose it's fine." Furusawa became Tatekabe's apprentice on the spot and began his career as a voice actor.

In 1994, Furusawa made his voice acting debut The Brave Police J-Decker as the voice of Deckerd. Afterwards, he was previously affiliated with Production Baobab, Kenyu Office, Bell Production, and Office Kaifu.

Starting April 2021, he changed the kanji spelling of his stage name from "Tōru Furusawa" (古澤徹), like his birth name, to "Tōru Furusawa" (古澤融). He changed his stage name after consulting his wife, deciding to "give himself a name" in order to commemorate overcoming stage fright and that the name was chosen with 'Yū' from yūwa and Minamoto no Tōru in mind.

== Filmography ==
=== Television animation ===
- Anime Ganbare Goemon (Mr. Protein)
- Cardcaptor Sakura (Yoshiyuki Terada (first season))
- Fushigi Yûgi (Nakago)
- Kurau Phantom Memory (Inspector Wong)
- Initial D (Natsuki Mogi's "papa")
- Magical Project S (Andou Toyokawa)
- Trigun (Millions Knives)
- Bleach (Zabimaru & Koga Gau)
- Super Robot Wars Original Generation: Divine Wars (Ingram Prisken)
- Flame of Recca (Noroi)
- Kamichu! (Tyler)
- Lucky Star (Tadao Hiiragi)
- Cyborg Kuro-chan (Dr. Go)
- Brave Police J-Decker (Deckerd/J-Decker/Fire J-Decker)
- Naruto (Yurinojō)
- Naruto Shippuden (Fukai) (episode 282 and 283)
- Naruto the Movie: Ninja Clash in the Land of Snow (Michy)
- Baccano! (Nicholas Wayne)
- The Book of Bantorra (Fotona)
- Ef: A Tale of Memories (Akira Amamiya)
- Rainbow: Nisha Rokubō no Shichinin (Kawamata)
- Toradora! (Rikuro Aisaka)
- Chrome Shelled Regios (Derk Saiharden)
- Phantom ~Requiem for the Phantom~ (Roshenko)
- Shuffle! (Mikio Fuyo)
- Hell Girl: Two Mirrors (Toshiya Kakinuma)
- Bokurano: Ours (Akira Tokosumi)
- Oishinbo (Hideo Tanimura)

=== Theatrical animation ===
- Cardcaptor Sakura (Yoshiyuki Terada)
- X/1999 (Seishirō Sakurazuka)
- Perfect Blue (Yatazaki)

=== Original video animation (OVA) ===
- Hunter × Hunter: G.I. Final (Razor)

=== Drama CD ===
- Abunai series 2: Abunai Summer Vacation
- Abunai series 4: Abunai Campus Love (Yoshitaka Izumi)
- Kiken ga Ippai (Kondou)
- Mizuki-sensei Ki wo Tsukete (Yukimasa Haneda)
- Otawamure wo Prince (Kouki Matsuo)
- Shiritsu Takizawa Koukou Seitokai (Satoshi Oozawa)
- Suit and Ribbon Tie (Ryuuichi Kijima)
- Weiss Kreuz (Ayame)

=== Dubbing ===
==== Live-action ====
- 8mm 2 (David Huxley (Johnathon Schaech))
- 24 (Wayne Palmer (D. B. Woodside))
- 2012: Supernova (Kelvin (Brian Krause))
- Aliens (Carter Burke (Paul Reiser))
- Anna Magdalena (Editor (Leslie Cheung))
- August Rush (Counselor Richard Jeffries (Terrence Howard))
- Bad Day (Harry McCann)
- The Basketball Diaries (Mickey (Mark Wahlberg))
- Basquiat (Jean-Michel Basquiat (Jeffrey Wright))
- The Bourne Supremacy (Tom Cronin (Tom Gallop))
- Brassed Off (Andy Barrow (Ewan McGregor))
- The Brave One (Detective Sean Mercer (Terrence Howard))
- Broken Arrow (Kelly (Howie Long))
- Carrington (Gerald Brenan (Samuel West))
- Deadly Heroes (Brad Cartowski (Michael Paré))
- Enemy of the State (Robert Clayton Dean (Will Smith))
- Extreme Ops (Jeffrey (Rupert Graves))
- The Fabulous Baker Boys (Lloyd (Xander Berkeley))
- Feast of Love (David Watson (Billy Burke))
- Fire Down Below (Earl Kellogg (Stephen Lang))
- Fringe (John Scott (Mark Valley))
- The Hunting Party (Duck (Terrence Howard))
- I Still Know What You Did Last Summer (Tyrell Martin (Mekhi Phifer))
- Iceman: The Time Traveller (Cheung (Simon Yam))
- Independence Day (Captain Jimmy Wilder (Harry Connick Jr.))
- Intensity (Jack Templeton (Kavan Smith))
- The Island of Dr. Moreau (Dr. Montgomery (Val Kilmer))
- Joshua (Ned Davidoff (Dallas Roberts))
- Journey to the Center of the Earth (2010 TV Asahi edition) (Max Anderson (Jean-Michel Paré))
- Killing Me Softly (Jake (Jason Hughes))
- Kit Kittredge: An American Girl (Jack Kittredge (Chris O'Donnell))
- Lara Croft: Tomb Raider – The Cradle of Life (Chen Lo (Simon Yam))
- Lethal Weapon 4 (Wah Sing Ku (Jet Li))
- Loch Ness Terror (James Murphy (Brian Krause))
- The Man Who Knew Too Little (Dimitri (John Thomson))
- Mindhunters (Gabe Jensen (LL Cool J))
- The Mist (Brent Norton (Andre Braugher))
- Newcastle (Victor Hoff (Reshad Strik))
- Nightwatch (Martin Bells (Ewan McGregor))
- Perfect Stranger (Cameron (Gary Dourdan))
- Platoon (1998 DVD edition) (Rhah (Francesco Quinn), Tex)
- Platoon (2003 TV Tokyo edition) (Ace)
- Rambo (Michael Burnett (Paul Schulze))
- Recoil (Detective Ray Morgan (Gary Daniels))
- Redbelt (Mike Terry (Chiwetel Ejiofor))
- Scream 2 (Phil Stevens (Omar Epps))
- Shoot 'Em Up (Mr. Smith (Clive Owen))
- Sliding Doors (James Hammerton (John Hannah))
- Speed Racer (Mr. Musha (Hiroyuki Sanada))
- SPL II: A Time for Consequences (Chan Kwok-wah (Simon Yam))
- Starship Troopers (Pvt. Ace Levy (Jake Busey))
- Stormbreaker (Yassen Gregorovich (Damian Lewis))
- Taegukgi (North Korean Commander (Choi Min-sik))
- Terminator 3: Rise of the Machines (Scott Mason (Mark Famiglietti))
- VR Troopers (Ryan Steele (Brad Hawkins))
- Wuthering Heights (Heathcliff (Laurence Olivier))

==== Animation ====
- Pocahontas (John Smith)
- Sleeping Beauty (Prince Phillip)
- Gulliver's Travels (Gulliver)

=== Video games ===
- Natsuki Crisis Battle (Endo)
- Guilty Gear 2: Overture (Izuna)
- Infinite Undiscovery (Eugene)
- Super Robot Wars series (Ingram Prisken)
- Kingdom Hearts Birth By Sleep (Prince Phillip)
- Mega Man Zero 4 (Tech Kraken)
