= Tokyo Babylon =

Japanese manga series

- First tankōbon volume cover, featuring Subaru Sumeragi

東京BABYLON
- Genre: Dark fantasy; Occult detective
- Manga
- Written by: Clamp
- Published by: Shinshokan
- English publisher: NA: Yen Press
- Magazine: South; Wings
- Original run: 1990 – 1993
- Volumes: 7
- Original video animation
- Directed by: Koichi Chigira
- Written by: Tatsuhiko Urahata
- Music by: Toshiyuki Honda
- Studio: Madhouse
- Licensed by: AUS / UK NA: Manga Entertainment (expired) U.S. Manga Corp (expired)
- Released: October 21, 1992 – March 21, 1994
- Episodes: 2
- Live-action film

Tokyo Babylon/1999 - The Movie
- Directed by: George Iida
- Music by: Kuniaki Haishima
- Studio: PDS
- Released: August 21, 1993
- Runtime: 100 minutes

Tokyo Babylon (東京BABYLON), also known as Tokyo Babylon: A Save Tokyo City Story, is a Japanese manga series written and illustrated by Clamp. It follows Subaru Sumeragi, the head of the Sumeragi clan, and his sister Hokuto, as they work to protect Tokyo from a myriad of supernatural perils while living with a man named Seishiro Sakurazuka. Shinshokan serialized it in their shojo manga magazines South and Wings from 1990 to 1993, and the series was collected into 7 tankōbon volumes.

Tokyopop first distributed the English-language version of the manga; this is now handled by Yen Press. The series is based on a self-written work, dōjinshi, writer Nanase Ohkawa created. Clamp decided to add dark social themes to the serialization because of the chapters' lengths. Clamp found it difficult to write the manga because it was being serialized alongside their first work, RG Veda. Between 1992 and 1994, Madhouse studio adapted Tokyo Babylon into a two-part original video animation series focused on the original storylines. PDS also produced a live-action feature film sequel, Tokyo Babylon 1999, which was released in August 1993, which is set after the events of the manga. A full anime television series adaptation, Tokyo Babylon 2021, was announced in 2020, but was cancelled in the wake of accusations of plagiarism.

The series has been well received for its focus on occultism and social themes. It is also famous in the West for including a homosexual relationship, explored through the characters of Subaru and Seishiro. The writers' heavy focus on Subaru's character development stood out alongside the art produced by Clamp. The manga is notorious for its open and tragic ending which is followed in Clamp's next work, X.

== Plot ==
Sixteen-year-old Subaru Sumeragi is a very powerful Japanese magician, often referred as a modern onmyōji. He is the thirteenth head of the foremost family of onmyōji in Japan, which has served the Emperor for centuries. As a result, he is called upon to solve various occult mysteries. He sometimes stumbles on people his kind nature compels him to help. He lives in Tokyo with his twin sister Hokuto, an exuberant girl, whose chief occupations are designing eccentric clothing for herself and her brother, and their mutual friend Seishiro Sakurazuka, a kindly, 25-year-old veterinarian, who often declares his love for Subaru. There are early hints of Seishiro's true nature. Hokuto jokes about him being a member of the family of Sakurazukamori, a clan of assassins who use onmyōjitsu to kill and are said to be the Sumeragis' opposite. Seishiro met Subaru as a kid and was impressed with the child's purity. Rather than killing him, Seishiro made a bet with him instead: He would meet Subaru again, and would spend one year with him, protecting him and trying to love him. If, at the end of that year, he felt something for Subaru which distinguished him from a thing he could easily destroy (as he could not with any other person), then he would not kill him. To recognize him, he marked him with inverted pentagrams on both hands, the sign of the Sakurazukamori's prey.

When Seishiro loses an eye protecting Subaru, the teenager realizes he is in love with him. As the year is over, Seishiro declares himself the winner of the bet. He breaks Subaru's arm and tortures him, but fails to kill him, as Subaru's grandmother breaks his spell - an action which leaves her crippled. Subaru's shock leaves him in a catatonic state. Hokuto feels guilty for promoting Seishiro, whom she knew to be dangerous, but believed to be the only one who might touch Subaru's heart. As a result, Hokuto asks Seishiro to kill her instead to protect her brother. Seeing her in a dream, Subaru is shocked out of his catatonia by her action. He vows to find Seishiro and take revenge for his sister's death, abandoning his present life. The manga ends with an adult and distant Subaru still searching for Seishiro.

== Characters ==
Seishiro Sakurazuka, Hokuto Sumeragi, and Subaru Sumeragi

Subaru Sumeragi (皇昴流, Sumeragi Subaru)
Voiced by: Kappei Yamaguchi (OVA) (Japanese); Ben Fairman (English)
The 13th Head of the Sumeragi clan, a family of onmyōji. He tends to be rather shy, but is extremely kindhearted. He constantly wears gloves over his hands for reasons known only to his grandmother.

Hokuto Sumeragi (皇北都, Sumeragi Hokuto)
Voiced by: Miki Itō (OVA) (Japanese); Jenny Baker (English)
Subaru's eccentric twin sister. She is quick-witted, bold and impulsive, the polar opposite of Subaru. While she lacks most of Subaru's strong spiritual abilities, she is still able to cast unique spells. She always means well and acts in Subaru's best interests. Hokuto designs the outrageous outfits she and Subaru often don.

Seishiro Sakurazuka (桜塚星史郎, Sakurazuka Seishirō)
Voiced by: Takehito Koyasu (OVA) (Japanese); Dean Fenton (English)
A veterinarian who claims to be romantically interested in Subaru. He is secretly the Sakurazukamori, a murderous onmyōji who first met him seven years ago.

== Production ==
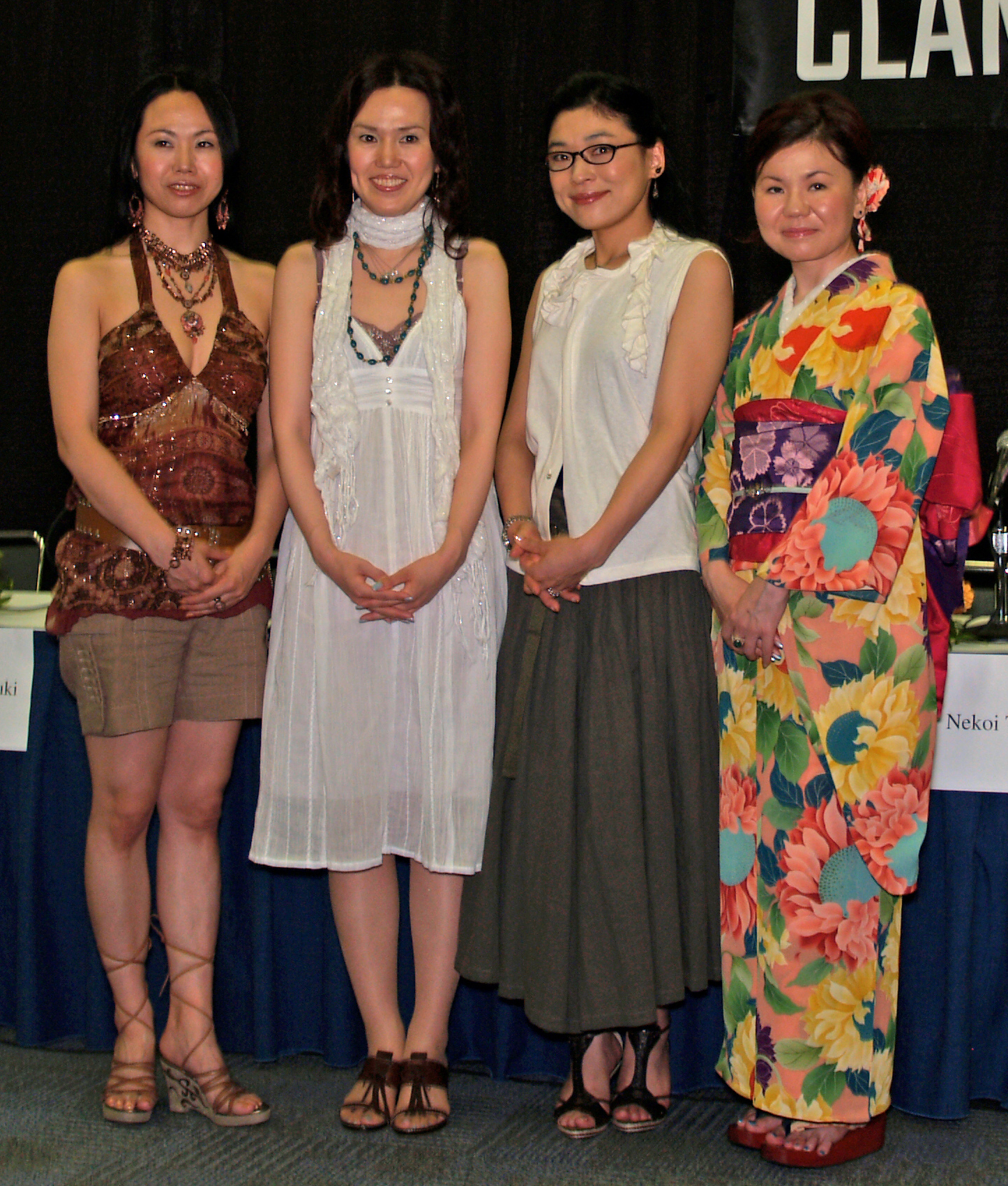
The series was written by Clamp based on their experience with Tokyo

Tokyo Babylon is based on a one-shot that Clamp head writer Nanase Ohkawa wrote for a magazine that featured dōjinshi. After Clamp got to illustrate the cover of the same magazine, Wings, with Subaru and Hokuto, the magazine proposed Clamp turn it into a series for their special edition South. Initially, the series was going to be called "Tokyo" but Clamp wanted to change it to give a more modern tone with the inclusion of Babylon according to them; the series was titled Tokyo Babylon reflecting how the city of Babylon resembled Tokyo, according to Clamp. The one-shot's characters, most notably Seishiro, were changed slightly when the series began.

Subaru and his twin sister Hokuto, and Seishiro, were conceived by the series' creator Ohkawa for a dōjinshi novel about an onmyōji who hunts elves. Only its beginning remains. The characters were drawn twice for covers, and when South asked Clamp to create a new series for them, these characters were used. Originally, the twins were conceived more as mascots, with Subaru being a penguin called Leone, named after the Subaru Leone car. Both Subaru and Hokuto were modified from the original art, whereas Seishiro was completely redesigned. Ohkawa remembers having trouble writing Subaru as she was not used to writing kind-hearted characters. Like Kero from their other manga Cardcaptor Sakura, the staff thought about drawing a pet, with Subaru and Hokuto originally being considered as one. Since Subaru and Hokuto were the protagonists, whenever the magazines required an image for Tokyo Babylon, both Subaru and Hokuto were used together.

When Tokyo Babylon's serialization began, Clamp was also writing RG Veda for the monthly magazine Wings. While the authors found this complicated, the series' quarterly publication of sixty pages resulted in the authors making several changes. The length of each chapter led the authors to write a darker story rather than a soft one as originally planned. Based on their experience in Tokyo, Clamp incorporated dark social themes, making the series realistic despite its focus on occultism. This also gave each chapter its own theme. Ohkawa believes their young age when writing the manga also influenced most of the series' negative messages. Although when the series began, the ending was already planned, it was not until the Tokyo Tower chapter that Clamp set the general atmosphere, with the pilot being perceived as a comedy. The next chapter involving Subaru's past meeting with a man, later revealed to be Seishiro, then sets the stage for the series' future. Since his introduction, Seishiro was written with the idea of him having a different agenda in contrast to his actions and dialog with the other leads. Seishiro was the easiest cast member to write while Subaru was the most challenging based on his good nature. In retrospect, Ohkawa believes that while RG Veda was their first series, Tokyo Babylon was their most original first work as they did not use other people's materials for this manga and it was influenced by their way of living. Though a 1990s manga, the narrative was influenced by the 1980s.

In creating the art, colored weft and light colors were used for the main illustrations. This proved to be difficult for the authors. Ohkawa believes the art was influenced by the years when the manga was published. This is reflected in how Clamp's artwork changed, particularly the clothing and, most notably, Hokuto's dresses. Mokona's works have been drawn with increasingly thicker lines across the serialzation of the manga. The character's faces have much thicker lines in the third volume of Tokyo Babylon compared to when the story first got serialized in South. This was made because the story had a serious, heavy theme, fine lines simply cannot bring out enough power to convince readers of the gravitas, so we make thicker lines when it fits the work. Such work caused Mokona to rely more on her stamina to properly draw the series.

== Themes ==
The series focuses on several social themes, such as faith, organ donation and the treatment of middle-aged men. However, the main philosophy seen across the storyline is individualism, the stance that emphasizes the moral worth of an individual. Subaru and Hokuto believe that nobody can fully understand another person's suffering. Despite his belief in this philosophy, Subaru is a resigned individual who worries more about others than himself. Subaru believes he can hurt others because he will never understand them. The same problem comes from Subaru and Hokuto being twins and trying to see each other as different people. Across the plot, Subaru develops as an individual. Seishiro deems his actions arrogant for assuming guilt. In addition, Subaru begins to take actions he believes are immoral, despite his good intentions, such as lying to a mother about her daughter's wish to stop her from taking revenge. Zona Negativa stated that despite the series's serialization in a shōjo magazine for young women, Subaru's hero journey felt more like that of a manga serialized in a shōnen magazine for young men, due to the many types of enemies he faces while finding his foes' deep nature.

Due to the dark nature Seishiro hides from Subaru, the two can be regarded as the yin and yang as the former contrasts the latter's kind self even when interacting with his job. Subaru's hidden romantic feelings towards Seishiro become obvious as the manga progresses as he becomes astonished when Seishiro keep professing his love towards him. The character's relationship with Seishiro led novelist Yoshiki Tanaka to call it tragic and striking, despite his early thoughts that it was a use of a relationship to appeal to female readers. When Subaru realizes his feelings towards him, his state can be compared to that the one of a hatched bird egg as a result of the maturity he shows in the process. Anime Feminist claims that while Subaru's characterization heavily relies on empathy, Clamp appears to send a message to the readers using Subaru as an audience surrogate that it is important for everybody to value themselves too although empathy on itself does not qualify as a negative trait. Manga Bookshelf focused more on how Subaru lost part of his identity as he saw Hokuto as another part of him leading to his lonely finale persona.

== Media ==
=== Manga ===
The Tokyo Babylon manga was published by Shinshokan in South and Wings magazines from 1990 to 1993 on a quarterly basis. Its chapters were collected in a total of seven tankōbon volumes. The series has been re-released in two different formats; five volumes in bunkoban format by Shinshokan and three volumes in aizōban format by Kadokawa Shoten. A Clamp Premium Collection release was released in 2022 by Kadokawa Shoten. A manga artbook entitled Tokyo Babylon Photographs was released on April 25, 1995. (Shinshokan: ISBN 978-4403650086).

Tokyopop announced they had licensed the series for a North American release in September 2003. They published the series in North America between May 11, 2004 and May 10, 2005. The manga was re-released in omnibus format by Dark Horse Comics in 2011.

During their Sakura-Con 2023 panel, Yen Press announced that they licensed the Clamp Premium Edition of the manga.

No.	Original release date	Original ISBN	North American release date	North American ISBN
1	April 10, 1991	4-403-61250-4	May 11, 2004	978-1-59182-871-6
Vol 0: "T·Y·O"; Vol 1: "Babel"; Vol 1.5: "Destiny"
2	November 10, 1991	4-403-61268-7	July 6, 2004	978-1-59182-872-3
Vol 2: "Dream"; Annex: "Smile"
3	January 25, 1992	4-403-61274-1	September 7, 2004	978-1-59182-873-0
Vol 3: "Call.A"; Vol 3: "Call.B"
4	July 10, 1992	4-403-61282-2	November 1, 2004	978-1-59182-874-7
Vol 4: "Crime"; Vol 5: "Save.A"; Vol 5: "Save.B"
5	April 5, 1993	4-403-61304-7	January 11, 2005	978-1-59532-049-0
Vol 6: "Old"; Vol 7: "Box"; Vol 8: "Rebirth"
6	August 25, 1993	4-403-61319-5	March 8, 2005	978-1-59532-050-6
Vol 9: "News"; Vol 10: "Pair"
7	March 25, 1994	4-403-61339-X	May 10, 2005	978-1-59532-051-3
Vol 11: "End"; Annex: "Secret"; Annex: "Start"

=== Anime ===
==== Original video animation ====
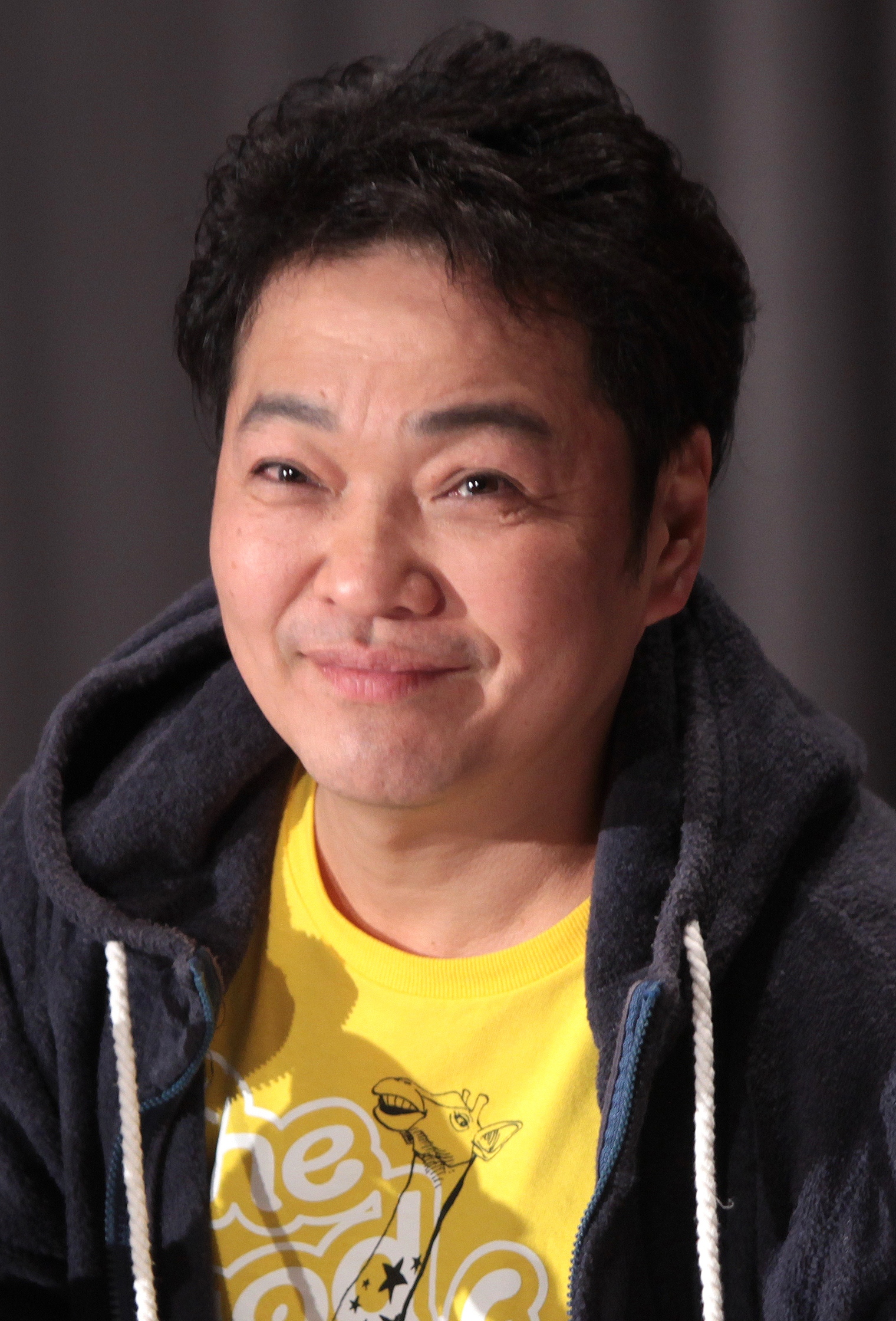
Kappei Yamaguchi voiced Subaru in the original video animations.

The original video animations (OVA) series are two episodes with original stories animated by Madhouse. They are written by Tatsuhiko Urahata and directed by Koichi Chigira, with characters designed by Kumiko Takahashi. The first episode has Subaru investigating the meaning behind several accidents in the construction of a building, while in the second he meets another onmyōji who is helping the police find a serial killer. Producer Yumiko Masujima remembers how difficult it was to recreate the manga's atmosphere in the OVAs. While originally released on VHS, the OVAs were re-released in Japan in DVD format on June 21, 2000. Central Park Media distributed the OVAs in Australia, the UK and France. US Manga Corps released the two OVA episodes on April 4 and July 11, 1995.

==== TV series ====
On October 25, 2020 at 15:00 UTC (October 26, 2020, at midnight Japan Standard Time), a trailer was released for a new anime adaptation of Tokyo Babylon. The series, titled Tokyo Babylon 2021, was to have been produced by GoHands, and was originally scheduled to premiere in April 2021. On November 19, it was confirmed that Shingo Suzuki and Susumu Kudo would have directed the series, Jun Kumagai would have overseen the series' scripts, Makoto Furuta would have designed the characters while serving as chief animation director with Keiji Tani, and Noriyuki Asakura would have composed the series' music at King Records. Shouta Aoi would have performed the series' opening theme song, while Nana Mizuki would have performed the series' closing theme song. On the same day, however, the anime production was accused of plagiarizing outfit designs for Subaru and Hokuto. After an investigation, on December 4, 2020, the anime producer apologized on their official website and announced that they would be changing the designs. Due to the necessary changes to be made, on December 24, 2020, the anime production committee announced that the series was delayed to an unspecified date. After more cases of plagiarism surfaced through an internal investigation, on March 29, 2021, the production committee announced that the current TV series would be canceled, while a new anime production would be produced by a different studio.

On August 3, 2021, it was reported that GoHands was suing King Records for ¥450 million for failing to pay the expenses they previously agreed to pay. In the lawsuit, it was revealed the GoHands series was planned to have run for 21 episodes. According to the same lawsuit, the first 13 episodes were completed by November 2020.

=== Live-action film ===
A live-action film called Tokyo Babylon/1999 was based on the series. It takes place five years after the end of the manga and its plot is based on the Tokyo Babylon story "Call.A" in volume three. Director George Iida requested the help of the OVA producer Yumiko Masujima in casting the main characters. The film is famous for being the first live-action production based on a Clamp series and the film's director, George Iida, expressed his satisfaction with the positive fan response. Following the end of the production of Tokyo Babylon, Iida asked Clamp to help with a sequel movie. The main idea was for Subaru and Seishiro to clash again. For this live-action sequel, Tokyo Babylon/1999, Toshihide Tonesaku played Subaru, his first role as a leading man.

The plot has Subaru investigating the death of a former enemy of the Sumeragi clan, Kaneyama. Before his death, Kaneyama had undertaken a new project: teaching seven girls how to use dark magic to take revenge on those they deem "guilty," beginning with an abusive teacher. One of the girls, Kurumi, starts to feel remorse; however, she is convinced by the others to continue with their plans. When Subaru attempts to stop them, they declare him to be their enemy and attack him. Subaru learns that his former friend-turned-enemy, assassin Seishiro, was the one who killed Kaneyama, and he has now turned his sights on the girls. The girls grow increasingly sick as a result of using the spells, and Subaru tries once more to save them. Seishiro appears, claiming that none of the girls can be saved. Subaru and Seishiro fight, only to be stopped by the appearance of the ghost of Hokuto, who asks them to stop for her sake. Seishiro leaves, and the fight is unresolved.

=== Other media ===
Subaru and Seishirō return in Clamp's apocalyptic manga series X. The story, set nine years following the end of Tokyo Babylon, has the two onmyōji on opposite sides during the final battle for humanity's future. Despite having no relation to Tokyo Babylon, Clamp's manga xxxHolic is also focused on social pathologies but with a different approach. Alternative versions of Subaru and Seishiro also appear in the crossover manga Tsubasa: Reservoir Chronicle, with Subaru appearing as a vampire and Seishiro as a vampire hunter pursuing him.

== Reception ==
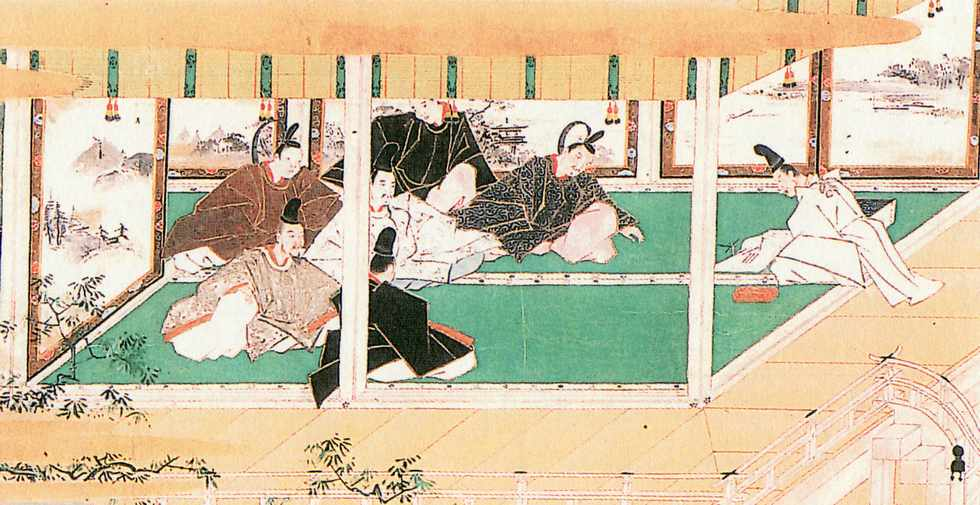
Subaru's job as an onmyōji was praised for being one of the earliest ones depicted in manga.

The Tokyo Babylon manga series has been popular, with its English releases often appearing on Diamond Comic Distributors' lists of best-selling comics. The series is credited for being one of the first onmyoji manga. It received generally positive critical response with the writers from Manga Bookshelf and Mania Entertainment referring to it as one of Clamp's best works based on the social themes reflected in the main cast whose traits, are developed across the story. In "Subaru Sumeragi and the dark side of total empathy in Tokyo Babylon", Anime Feminist claims that while Subaru's characterization heavily relies on empathy, Clamp appears to send a message to the readers using Subaru as an audience surrogate that it is important for everybody to value themselves too although empathy on itself does not qualify as negative trait.

Besides its focus on supernatural events, the series is famous for exploring young homosexual romance, shonen ai, seen in the interactions between Subaru and Seishiro. In Manga: The Complete Guide, Jason Thompson commented that the manga is well known in the West for being one of the most famous and first portrayals of a homosexual relationship. Comic Book Resources regarded Tokyo Babylon as one of Clamp's most famous works despite lacking an anime. They also cited the tragic relationship between Subaru and Seishiro as one of its biggest strengths.

When the series was reaching its climax, Wings editor Miki Ishikawa remembers receiving several letters from fans asking for a happy ending. Once the series ended, more letters expressed sadness and shock over the tragic ending; fans wanted more explanations of Hokuto's fate. Regarding this character, Ishikawa considered her popularity an exception, considering most readers tend to be more attracted to the series' male characters. The writers from Manga Book Shelf noted that the series' open ending has also been a subject of controversie with fans, but Seishiro's dark revelation, despite how it seems, had a major impact on the reader. The tragic ending portrayed in the final volume made Anime News Network comment that Subaru is, "treated like absolute crap despite being one of the purest boys in anime and manga". Regarding Subaru's darker characterization in the finale, Rebecca Silverman from Anime News Network says he "became" Seishiro. Silverman commented that this change is paralleled in their next work, xxxHolic, where its lead character Kimihiro Watanuki, began to act like his former boss Yuko Ichihara.

The artwork was praised for its appeal despite Publishers Weekly reviewing it nearly twenty years after its original release. Most of the reviewer's compliments referred to the landscapes and the atmosphere, while Mania Entertainment also praised its simple state created by Mokona. Anime News Network liked the clothing the cast wears. Jason Thompson enjoyed the background details. The city of Tokyo is well illustrated, giving it a realistic look. Manga News, felt the artwork had the appeal of other Clamp series, most notably RG Veda, even though both series were published at the same time. Furthermore, the characters designs were praised for their uniqueness. In another overview of the series, Manga News felt that the artwork had a charm in the way it was executed through the storyline's style such as how different the secondary characters are from the main characters.

The OVAs were the subject of positive response thanks to its animation, which has been called "stunning". Furthermore, reviewers had positive opinions with its dark images. They have been recommended to X fans for Subaru's appearances as well as to female viewers. The story of the OVAs were described as "complex", and has been praised for its focus on horror even though the violent imagery may bother viewers.
