= Subaru Sumeragi =

Fictional character from Tokyo Babylon and X

- Tokyo Babylon and X character
- Subaru, as he appears in Tokyo Babylon: CLAMP Premium Collection Volume 1.
- First appearance: Tokyo Babylon, Vol. 0 (1990)
- Created by: Clamp
- Voiced by: Japanese: Kappei Yamaguchi (Tokyo Babylon); Issei Miyazaki (X feature film); Tomokazu Sugita (X TV series); Hiro Shimono (Tsubasa Tokyo Revelations; English: Ben Fairman (Tokyo Babylon) William Dufris (X feature film); Dave Wittenberg (X TV series); Micah Solusod (Tsubasa Tokyo Revelations)
- Portrayed by: Tonesaku Toshihide (Tokyo Babylon/1999)

In-universe information
- Gender: Male
- Occupation: Onmyōji
- Weapon: Ofuda
- Significant other: Seishiro Sakurazuka
- Relatives: Previous Sumeragi Leader (grandmother); Hokuto Sumeragi (twin sister)
- Nationality: Japanese (born in Kyoto)

Subaru Sumeragi (Japanese: 皇昴流, Hepburn: Sumeragi Subaru) is the fictional protagonist of Clamp's manga series Tokyo Babylon. The head of the Sumeragi clan (皇一族, Sumeragi Ichizoku), Subaru is a young onmyōji in charge of exorcising demons and helping spirits reach the afterlife, while living with his twin sister Hokuto and love interest Seishiro Sakurazuka. Following the events of Tokyo Babylon, an adult Subaru appears in the live-action film Tokyo Babylon 1999 investigating a murder case. He becomes one of mankind's seven protectors in Clamp's series X, and Seishiro is his new rival. Subaru's fate in the battle of the end of the world has differed across X's multiple animated adaptations. An alternate version of the character appears in Clamp's crossover series, Tsubasa: Reservoir Chronicle.

Clamp writer Nanase Ohkawa first created Subaru as a mascot for a fancomic, dōjinshi, about onmyōji. Clamp found it difficult to engage a writer for Subaru because their authors were not used to writing kindhearted characters. For X, he was given a more tragic characterization meant to contrast with the lead Kamui Shiro. Multiple voice actors have provided their talent for Subaru's animated appearances. Tonesaku Toshihide portrays him in the live-action film Tokyo Babylon 1999. Critical reception to the character has been mostly positive. Manga and anime publications focused on Subaru's caring personality and his growing relationship with Seishiro such as during the narrative of Tokyo Babylon. Critics also praised his return in X to face the man he loves as a rival, resulting in him being one of the series' most interesting characters.

== Creation and development ==
A comparison illustration of the Volks doll and Subaru's new design that were investigated because of their many similarities.

Subaru Sumeragi originated from a dōjinshi novel by Clamp headwriter Nanase Ohkawa. It involved a Japanese exorcist, onmyōji, who hunts elves. Subaru was present along with the original cast of whom only Hokuto Sumeragi and Seishiro Sakurazuka remain. The characters were twice drawn for covers, and when the members from the manga magazine South asked Clamp to create a new series for them, these characters were used in Tokyo Babylon. Originally, the twins were conceived more as mascots with Subaru being a penguin called Leone, a reference to the Subaru Leone car. Both Subaru and Hokuto were modified from the original art in contrast to Seishiro, who was completely redesigned. Ohkawa remembers having trouble writing Subaru, as she was not used to writing kindhearted characters in contrast to Seishiro. Like Kero from their work Cardcaptor Sakura, the staff thought about drawing a pet with Subaru. Hokuto had originally been considered as one. Had Subaru become the pet rather than the protagonist, Clamp would have written him as a penguin, though Clamp scrapped that idea. Since Subaru and Hokuto were the protagonists, whenever the magazines required an image for Tokyo Babylon, both Subaru and Hokuto were used together.

Subaru and Seishiro's respective designs pay homage to Yasunori Katō, the protagonist of the fantasy novel Teito Monogatari, widely credited with starting the "onmyōji boom" in Japan. At the beginning of the Tokyo Babylon manga, Kato even has a cameo appearance as Subaru's "helpful ambassador". The Clamp News 2 newsletter lists Subaru's birth as taking place in Kyoto at 12:20 pm on February 19, 1974, with Hokuto being born at 6am. Subaru's incarnation from the series' chapter "Call A" with "Vol 6." have been called completely different incarnations of the same characters in order to avoid a contradiction in the setting. Mokona designed most of Sumeragi's clothing, but sometimes Ohkawa, Mick Nekoi and Satsuki Igarashi pitched in with ideas, too.

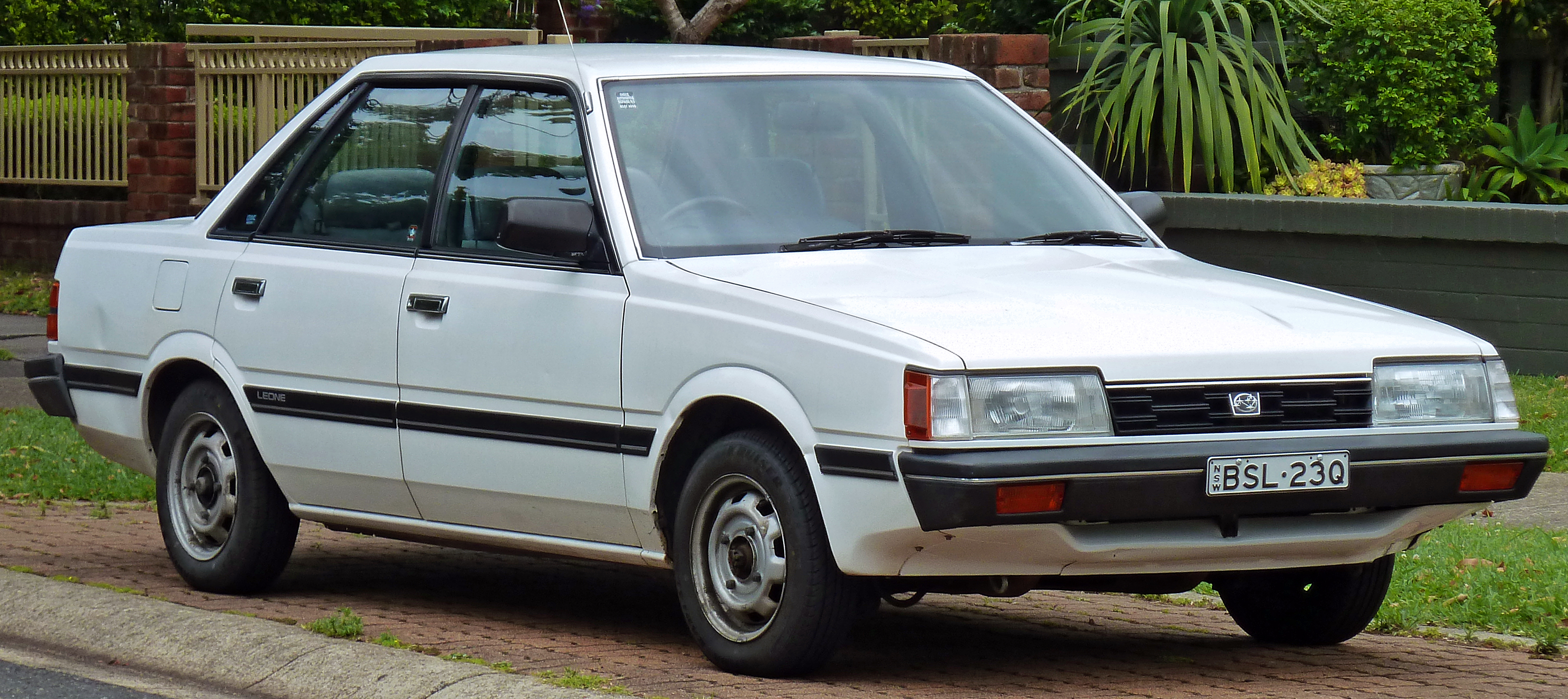
Subaru originally has a mascot called Leone, named after the compact car Subaru Leone.

Following the end of the production of Tokyo Babylon, film director George Iida asked Clamp to help with a sequel movie. The main idea was for Subaru and Seishiro to clash again. For this live-action sequel, Tokyo Babylon/1999, Toshihide Tonesaku played Subaru. Subaru was the first character Tonesaku portrayed as a leading man. Because of production issues, Subaru and Seishiro's interactions were reduced and used only in a Drama CD. To promote the movie, Mokona drew illustrations for both characters.

Subaru and Seishiro reappear in Clamp's manga X because their relationship parallels that of the lead Kamui Shiro and the main antagonist, Fuma Monou. They serve as an example to Kamui and Fuma. One of X's most important developments is the question of what these two will do, so as not end up like Subaru and Seishiro. Clamp has compared the bond between Subaru and Kamui with that of siblings. A common theme involves the series' fate; Subaru expresses no interest in the future of the Earth, but he and his counterpart are still drawn to Tokyo on the Promised Day. As a result, a fatalistic atmosphere persists in the series. Although Subaru and Seishiro are written as rivals, illustrations from the series tend to show the bond the two had. Clamp believes the red thread of fate they share in an image was drawn in a forced manner in restrospect.

A common trope Clamp enjoys exploring in their work is the use of identical characters. When the manga Tsubasa: Reservoir Chronicle manga was made, Subaru was envisioned as Kamui's twin brother. Clamp had fun writing this take on this pair of characters despite them not being identical twin brothers. Furthermore, Subaru was meant to have a larger role in Tsubasa mentoring the protagonist Syaoran; he was replaced by Seishiro. Subaru was also meant to chase Seishiro instead, but because this event had been used previously in both Tokyo Babylon and X, the change was made.

In November 2020, the anime GoHands production of the Tokyo Babylon 2021 was accused of plagiarizing outfit designs for Subaru and Hokuto; Subaru's onmyōji outfit was thought to closely resemble a 2017 doll created by Volks. After an investigation, on 4 December 2020, the staff expressed their apologies and gratitude to the costumes' rights holders, and revealed that they plan to form a more effective compliance team to prevent future situations like this.

=== Casting ===
Multiple actors have voiced Subaru:

- In the first OVAs of Tokyo Babylon, Kappei Yamaguchi portrayed Subaru in Japanese while Ben Fairman did the job for the English dub.
- In the X film Issei Miyazaki took the role in Japanese while William Dufris did the English dub. Miyazaki portrayed an adult Subaru.
- In X television series the character is voiced by Tomokazu Sugita in Japanese and Dave Wittenberg in English. Like Miyazaki's work, Sugita had to voice a more adult Subaru than the one from the OVAs.
- In the Tsubasa Tokyo Revelations OVAs, Subaru was voiced by Hiro Shimono in Japanese and Micah Solusod in English. Shimono expressed his difficulties with voicing the young Subaru.
- For the 2021Tokyo Babylon anime, Shouta Aoi would voice the character. Aoi expressed his pleasure in adapting one of Clamp's most famous works and hoped the audience will enjoy his portrayal of Subaru.

=== Characterization and themes ===
Subaru's adult persona from the end of Tokyo Babylon and X places heavy focus on smoking like Seishiro as he became obsessed with such character.

A common philosophy in Tokyo Babylon is how the siblings Subaru and Hokuto believe that nobody can fully understand another person's suffering. Despite his belief in this philosophy, Subaru is a resigned individual who worries more about others than himself. Additionally, he starts taking actions that he believes are immoral despite his reasons for them such as lying to a mother about her daughter's wish to stop her from taking revenge. In Clamp no Kiseki, the writers describe Subaru as a kindhearted guy whose past with Seishiro revealed in flashback foreshadow an important event in his life. As Seishiro constantly mentions his one-sided affections towards him, Subaru often notices he also cares about him. Because of his upbringing as a medium, Subaru is often portrayed as a too sensitive person as often suffers when meeting others. However, the gentleness Subaru demonstrates in the series can also be described as another form of strength as he still stands up for the weak, to the point of rarely showing anger when defending them.

The relationship Subaru has with his twin Hokuto also places a heavy emphasis on Subaru's identity as Hokuto often supports him in regards to his job. Due to the dark nature Seishiro hides from Subaru, the two can be regarded as the yin and yang as the former contrasts his the latter's kind self even when interacting about his job. Subaru's hidden romantic feelings towards Seishiro become obvious as the manga progresses as he becomes astonished when Seishiro keep profressing his love towards him. When Subaru realizes his feelings towards him, his state can be compared to that the one of a hatched bird egg as a result of the maturity he shows in the process.

Subaru's personality changes when Hokuto is murdered by Seishiro, becoming a distant and lonely adult in the timeskip. He becomes a smoker as it reminds him of Seishiro and his past which he used to enjoy. In the finale, Subaru once again sympathizes with the people who committee evil deeds to the point of believing that he is also similar to Seishiro. When meeting the young Kamui Shiro, the previous distant Subaru shows a more comforting side as he helps him to face reality during the events of X. His past persona is also hinted more when Fuma Monou grants him one of the wishes he had in the past, hinting that the bond between Subaru and Seishiro is still prominent. When Seishiro dies in battle, Subaru tells Kamui that there is not a single path that might make everybody's dreams come true, something that heavily affects him. However, when Fuma offers Subaru to transplant Seishiro' lost eye, Clamp wrote it in a way so the bond between Subaru and Seishiro will never be destroyed.

== Appearances ==
=== Tokyo Babylon ===
In Tokyo Babylon Subaru appears as a cheerful yet bashful teenager from Tokyo, utterly devoted to helping others in his capacity as Japan's most powerful onmyōji: exorcising demons, helping lost souls ascend to the afterlife, entering the minds of comatose people to bring them back to the world, and fighting those who abused spiritual powers. He would often stand up to bullies and provide comfort and friendship to their victims. Subaru lives with his sister Hokuto, whose personality had become the polar opposite to his own—eccentric and outgoing. Subaru and Hokuto are good friends with a kindly and magically aware veterinarian named Seishiro Sakurazuka, whom they met at a railway station after Subaru's shikigami led him on a bizarre chase. Seishiro acts as guardian to them both and claims to love Subaru. Despite working as an onmyōji, Subaru claims that his dream is to become a veterinarian like Seishiro; in his childhood Subaru had a dog as a pet and became depressed when it became sick and died. He believes that he is able to connect more with animals than with humans.

After Seishiro loses the sight in his right eye protecting Subaru, the onmyōji realizes he loves him. However, Seishiro reveals that he is the Sakurazukamori, a ruthless magical assassin raised to be incapable of either love or hate. Lifting the veil he had placed on the boy's memory, Seishiro reveals he met Subaru as a child and made a promise to him; if they met again, he would live with the boy for a year to see if his heart could be moved. However, the assassin claims he was as barren of emotion as ever, and attempts to kill Subaru. The boy's grandmother rescues him at great personal cost. Subaru becomes catatonic as a result, but recovers when Hokuto dies at the Sakurazukamori's hands to spare Subaru. Subaru decides at this point to drop out of school so that he can focus on training. He continues his work as an onmyōji, remaining compassionate towards others but acting more reserved.

=== Tokyo Babylon 1999 ===
In the live action film Tokyo Babylon 1999 (1993), Subaru, portrayed by Tonesaku Toshihide, continues his work as a young adult. He meets seven teenage onmyōji who wish to avenge their teacher murdered by Seishiro. Subaru investigates the death of a former enemy of the Sumeragi clan, Kaneyama. Before his death, Kaneyama had undertaken a new project: teaching a group of seven teenage girls how to use dark magic to take revenge on those they deem "guilty," beginning with an abusive teacher. One of the girls, Kurumi, begins to feel remorse. Subaru learns that his friend-turned-enemy, Seishiro, was the one who killed Kaneyama, and he has now turned his sights on the women. As Subaru is unwilling to fight them in return, Seishiro appears, claiming that none of the girls can be saved. Subaru and Seishiro fight, but are stopped by the appearance of the ghost of Hokuto possessing Kurumi's body. Hokuto asks Subaru to drop his hatred of Seishiro; Subaru agrees to do so. Seishiro leaves, and the fight is unresolved. Subaru takes the girls to the police in hopes they will choose a better future. A drama CD for the film was also released featuring Subaru investigating a murder case by Seishiro.

=== X ===
Subaru returns as a supporting character in the manga X. Now as an adult, Subaru continues his work as an onmyōji under the direction of his grandmother. He is recognized to be one of the Dragons of Heaven meant to save mankind from the Dragons of Earth. When Seishiro destroys one of Tokyo's barriers, the Nakano Sun Plaza, as one of the Dragons of Earth starts an earthquake, Subaru briefly fights his nemesis. However, Subaru is wounded and Seishiro retreats. When joining the Dragons of Heaven to prepare for the battle in Tokyo, he brings Kamui Shiro out of the catatonic state into which he had fallen after seeing his childhood sweetheart, Kotori Monou, killed by her brother Fūma. Subaru and Kamui develop a close friendship based on the similar hardships they have endured. Subaru acts as a mentor to Kamui during his further trials and helps him with his high school studies after joining a college.

When Subaru faces Fūma in battle, his enemy blinds him in his right eye—a lesser wish Subaru had held for some time. In single combat against Seishiro at Rainbow Bridge, Subaru reveals his true desire: he wants Seishiro to kill him, so he would then exist in his heart. However, because of a spell cast by Hokuto at her death, the killing strike is reversed, and Subaru kills Seishiro instead. Hokuto told him this spell was cast when he killed her as she said she had the least confidence that Seishiro actually cared about her brother. Because of Seishiro's death, Subaru loses his will to fight along with his ability to create a barrier, which causes him to leave the Dragons of Heaven. Fūma brings him Seishiro's last eye which is necessary to grant the assassin's wish—erasing Fūma's mark in Subaru by replacing the wounded eye. Subaru accepts the eye, inheriting Seishiro's powers and the Sakurazukamori (桜塚護; lit. "Cherry Blossom burial mound guardian") title in the process and becomes one of the Dragons of Earth. Despite joining Fūma, Subaru is still interested in Kamui's true wish.

Subaru appears briefly in the 1996 movie version of X; he and Seishiro destroy each other in magical combat early in the film. In the TV series, Subaru sinks back into a catatonic state following Seishiro's death. The rebellious Dragon of Earth dream seer Kakyō Kuzuki allows the spirit of Hokuto to cross into Subaru's mind, to convince him to continue the fight; Subaru protects Kamui in his final battle against Fūma. He urges him to grant his own wish regardless of the consequence. Outside manga and anime, Subaru also appears in the video game X: Unmei no Sentaku. Should the player beat the game as Subaru, the character and Fuma kill each other. He is also the focus of the third CD of the X Character Files audio drama series where Tomokazu Sugita provides his voice.

=== Other appearances ===
Subaru has appeared in two adaptations of the Tokyo Babylon manga. In the original video animation (OVA) Subaru investigates the tragedies occurring at a construction site, while in the second he searches for a murderer. In both OVAs, Subaru still lives with Hokuto and Seishiro before the series' end. In volume one of xxxHolic, the witch Yūko Ichihara mentions knowing an onmyōji with a twin sister whom she has known since the boy was very young. She hopes that the boy will be happy. This onmyōji is Subaru.

In Tsubasa: Reservoir Chronicle, Subaru reappears as one of a pair of twin vampires alongside Kamui for whom Seishiro is searching. He appears in the Tokyo arc, where he talks to a comatose Sakura and urges her to wake up before she is lost to her dreams. It turns out that he was left in a comatose state at the bottom of a large water reservoir, leading to Kamui's fierce protection of the site. Once the young traveller Syaoran takes its power, Subaru wakes and is reunited with his twin. Feeling guilty for ruining their water resources, Subaru wants to recover them. Yūko can grant this by using their vampire blood to regenerate the wounds of the dying sorcerer Fai D. Flowright. Subaru agrees but Kamui decides to take his place, claiming that Subaru already shared his blood. Following Fai's recovery, the two vampires prepare to abandon Tokyo.

== Reception ==
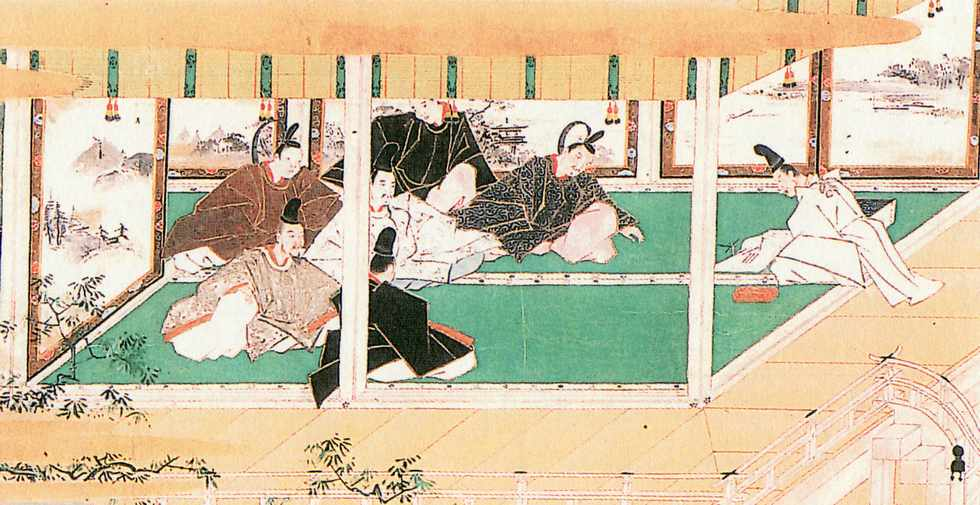
Subaru's job as an onmyōji was praised for being one of the earliest ones depicted in manga.

Subaru's character has received a positive critical response for appearances in manga and anime publications since his introduction in Tokyo Babylon. Anime News Network listed him as the best anime exorcist based on the cases he deals with across the series. While reviewing the Tokyo Babylon OVAs, Chris Beveridge from Mania Entertainment found Subaru's portrayal interesting and recommended it to X fans to explore the character more. Josh Begley noted that Subaru's works stand out from the other magical persons seen in Western works, pointing out how he interacts with spirits, giving each of them compassion much to the critic's surprise. Sptig Hogset from THEM Anime Reviews mentioned that Subaru unfit for his job because of his quiet personality. Writers from Manga Bookshelf noted how Subaru deeply believes in the philosophy that nobody can fully understand another person's pain and thus he is unwilling to become attached to other characters. As Subaru develops feelings for Seishiro without realizing it, he starts growing as an individual. Zona Negativa stated that despite the series is serialized in a shōjo magazine for young women, Subaru's hero journey felt more like that of a manga serialized in a shōnen magazine for young men, due to the many types of enemies he faces while finding his foes' deep nature and thus he might attract male readers. In general, Subaru is credited for being one of the first onmyoji manga which inspired more series with more onmyoji.

Rebecca Silverman from Anime News Network noted that Subaru's darker characterization in the series' ending was so similar to Seishiro's that he acted like the man lived. Silverman commented that this change was paralleled in their next work, xxxHolic, where its lead character Kimihiro Watanuki began to act like his former boss Yuko Ichihara. Manga Bookshelf's regarded Subaru's darker characterization, rather than comparing it with Seishiro's like Silverman, they focused more on how Subaru lost part of his identity as he saw in Hokuto another part of himself. Novelist Yoshiki Tanaka believes one of Subaru's greatest appeals to female readers is his innocence displayed when he interacts with ghosts despite the dangers this interaction can produce.

Critics also focused on Subaru's relationship with Seishiro Sakurazuka. Mike Dungan from Mania Entertainment noted that this was a nod to Clamp's dōjinshi fan-base. In the book Manga: The Complete Guide, Jason Thompson commented that the manga is famous in the West for being one of the first literary forms to portray homosexual relationships, comparing Subaru and Seishiro with the seme and uke couple despite their romance not being explored until the ending. Anime News Network praised the lighthearted context Clamp gave the narrative for downplaying the scenes between Subaru and Seishiro. Tanaka found the relationship between Subaru and Seishiro more striking based on the elements of tragedy and the foreshadowing of their original meeting. In "Subaru Sumeragi and the dark side of total empathy in Tokyo Babylon", Anime Feminist claims that while Subaru's characterization heavily relies on empathy, Clamp appears to send a message to the readers using Subaru as an audience surrogate that it is important for everybody to value themselves too although empathy on itself does not qualify as negative trait. Anime Feminist noted that X treated Subaru and Seishiro as a toxic relationship due to their tragic nature when Seishiro is recognized as an individual who actually showed romantic feelings towards Subaru. Although Seishiro's death leads to more of Subaru's suffering and his eventual alliance with Fuma, Subaru is not portrayed as an antagonistic character as he shows that he is still the kind protagonist from Tokyo Babylon when he continues his support towards Kamui's fights.

Subaru's role in X has received a similar response. His debut was praised by Mania Entertainment's Chris Beveridge for his changed personality resulted from Hokuto's death, while Manga News also enjoyed how he acted as a mentor to the lead Kamui Shiro, making him a more fitting main character in the process. Multiple critics also commented on his duel against Seishiro based on their tragic relationship and result. Manga News stated that while Subaru and Seishiro's fight was one of the most anticipated based on how Subaru changed since his sister was killed, he still could not bring himself to stop loving Seishiro. This is made clearer by Subaru's depressed portrayal when Seishiro dies, though he finds a reason to live when learning that Seishiro's last wish was to give Subaru his eye to replace his blind one.

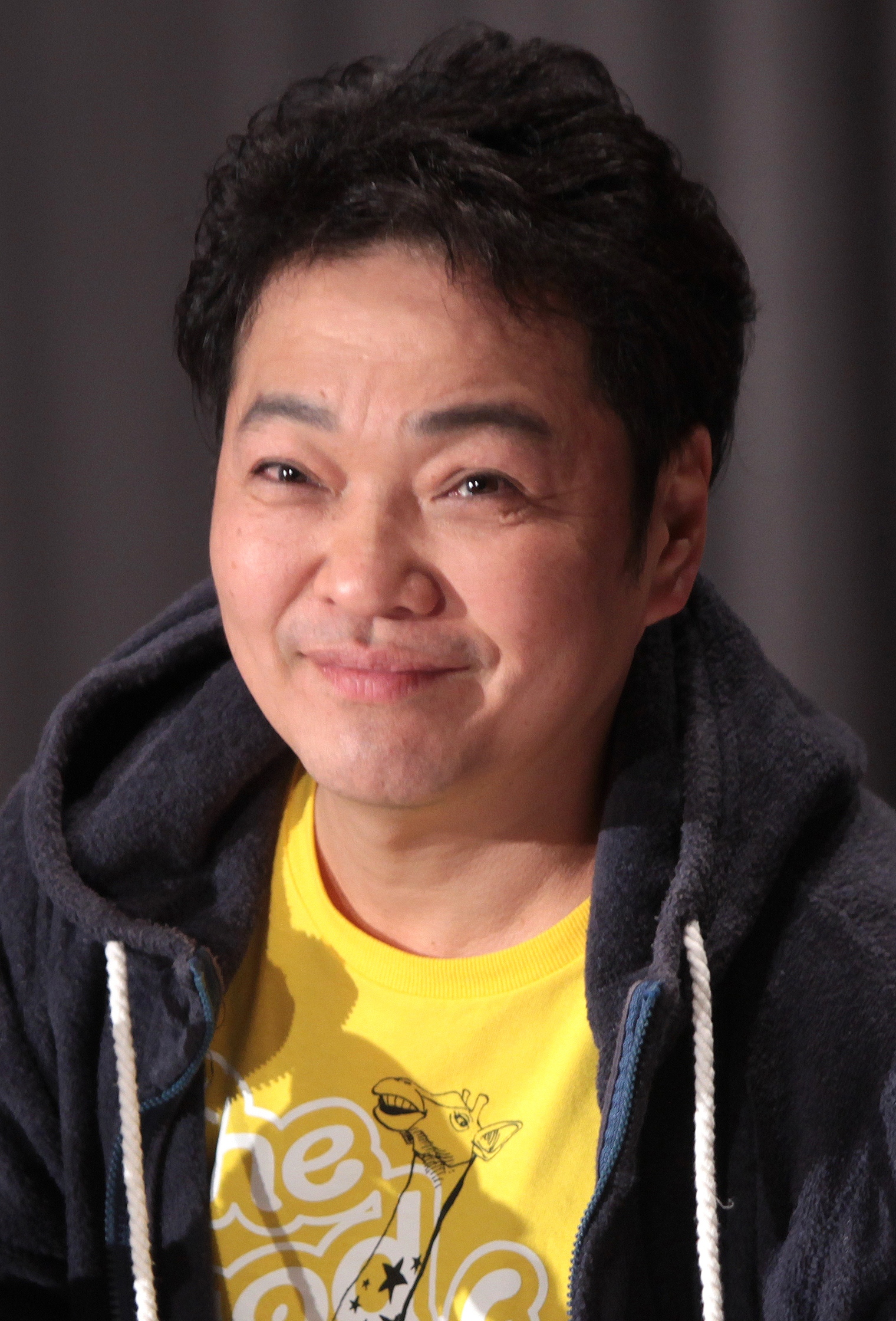
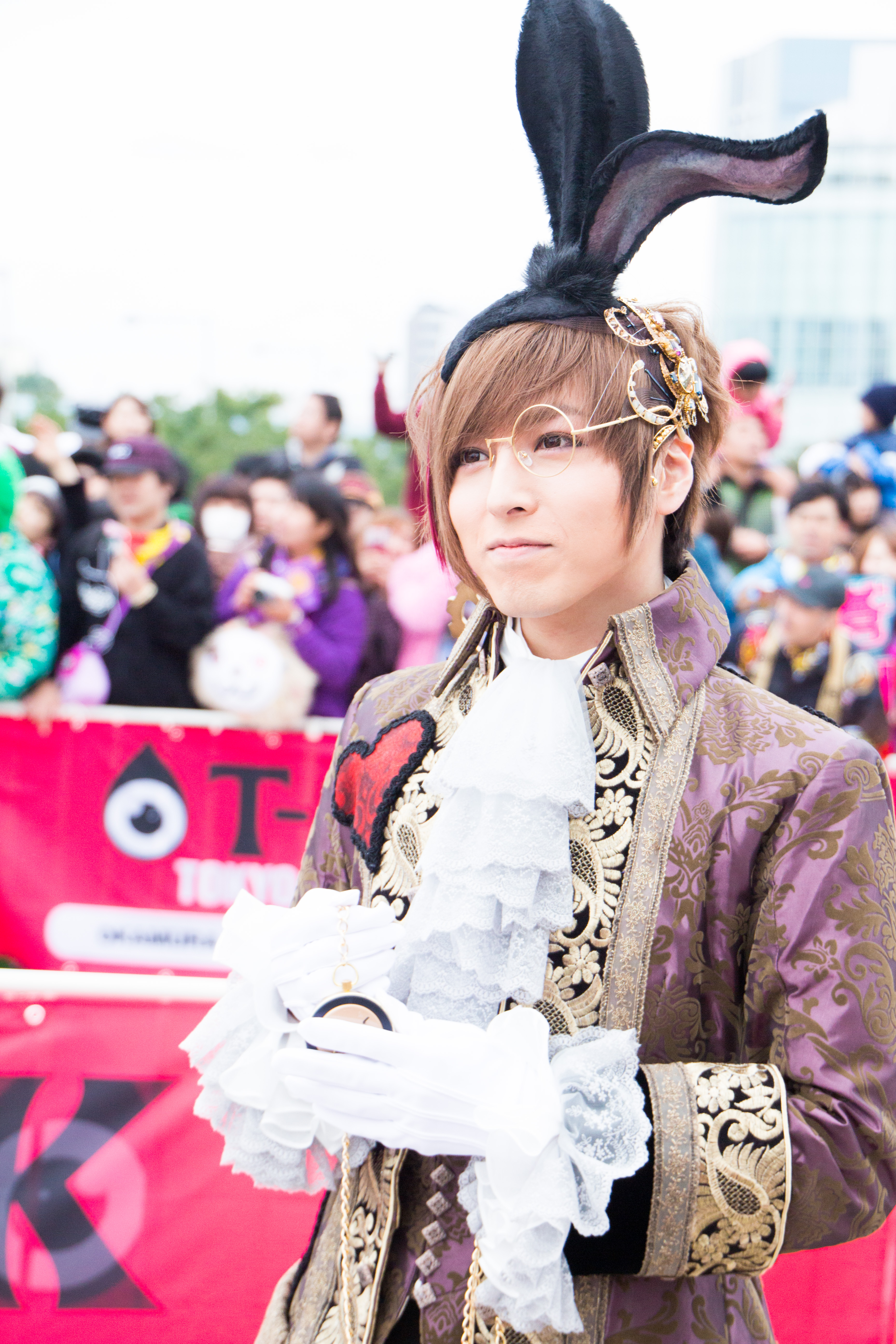
While Kappei Yamaguchi's portrayal of Subaru earned positive reviews in the OVAs, Shouta Aoi (right) could not provide his voice in the remake due to the series' cancellation

In the book Understanding Manga and Anime, writer Robin E. Brenner states that while Western readers have previously seen Subaru and Seishiro's dysfunctional relationship in other series, it stands out because Western authors tend to avoid portraying homosexual relationships. He referred as well to Subaru's and Seishiro's relationship as one of the most explicit ones from X. Regarding his role in Rintaro's 1996 movie of X, Ex mentioned his appearances as he and Seishiro are killed quickly. The character's inclusion in Tsubasa: Reservoir Chronicle was well received by Sakura Eries from The Fandom Post. She elaborated that the use of Kamui and Subaru as vampires is well executed and with their help, Fai D. Flowright survives his blood loss after Syaoran takes his eye, becoming a vampire to survive. Like other critics, the writer wondered when Clamp would explore his past.

Concerning the voice actors, Animate Times noted Kappei Yamaguchi's portrayal of the character was positive; a female viewer commented he made the character attractive to listen to. Tomokazu Sugita's portrayal of Subaru in X was praised by Merumo, who also enjoyed the older characterization in this series. Due to the multiple voice actors portraying Subaru, Excite commented that fans of the character have multiple favorites, which led the site to comment that for the 2021 anime adaptation of Tokyo Babylon many fans are looking forward to the new voice they would provide him.
