= Rintaro =

Japanese anime director (born 1941)

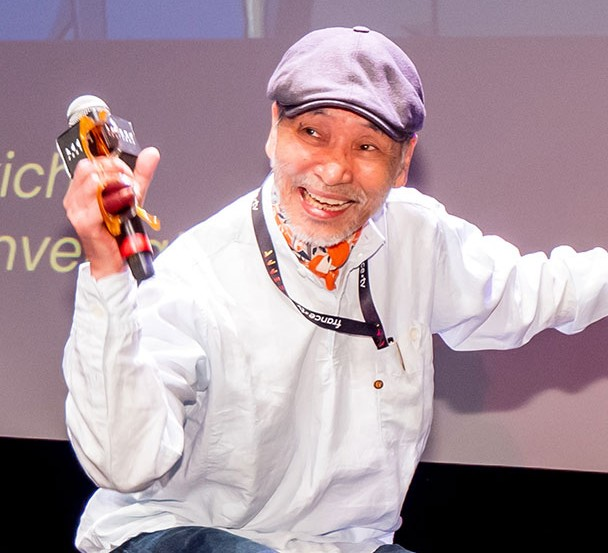
- Born: Shigeyuki Hayashi; January 22, 1941 (age 85); Tokyo, Japan
- Other name: Kuruma Hino
- Years active: 1958–present
- Awards: Won: Alexander Senki, Netizen's Choice Award, Puchon International Fantastic Film Festival (1998); Metropolis, 2nd Place, Best Animation Film, Fant-Asia Film Festival (2001); Nominations: Metropolis, Best Film (nomination), Festival de Cine de Sitges (2001)

Shigeyuki Hayashi (林 重行, Hayashi Shigeyuki; born January 22, 1941), known professionally as Rintaro (りんたろう, Rintarō) is a Japanese anime director. He works frequently with the animation studio Madhouse (which he co-founded), though he is a freelance director not employed directly by any one studio. He began working in the animation industry—at age 17—as an in-between animator on the 1958 film Hakujaden. His works have won and been nominated for multiple awards, including a nomination for Best Film (Metropolis) at the 2001 Festival de Cine de Sitges.

Rintaro has also worked under the name Kuruma Hino, in addition to his best known pseudonym and his birth name. His pseudonym is sometimes miswritten as Rin Taro or Taro Rin. He is a founding member of the Japanese Animation Creators Association (JAniCA) labor group.

== Biography ==
Rintaro was born in Tokyo. His first job in the animation industry was as an in-between animator on the 1958 film Hakujaden, which he worked on while working at Toei Animation. After working on two additional films there, he began working for Mushi Productions, the studio run by Osamu Tezuka. His first directing job was the fourth episode of the 1963 series Astro Boy. After leaving Mushi in 1971 to become a freelancer, he worked on many TV series and films, and established himself as one of the most respected and well-known anime directors in Japan.

Rintaro is a fan of science fiction, and has been influenced by American westerns, gangster films, film noir, and French films. Additionally, he was influenced by Osamu Tezuka, and worked with him on Kimba the White Lion and Astro Boy. He said that when he was making Metropolis, which was based on Tezuka's manga of the same name, he "wanted to communicate Tezuka's spirit". Rintaro personally introduced the film at the Big Apple Anime Fest in 2001, where it was screened before its theatrical release by TriStar Pictures.

In recent years, Rintaro has lectured at Kyoto Seika University.

In 2023, a short film directed by Rintaro, Yamanaka Sadao ni Sasageru Manga Eiga 'Nezumikozō Jirokichi', premiered at the 1st Niigata International Animation Film Festival.

Rintaro's brother, Masayuki Hayashi, is himself an anime director and animator with credits including Wandering Sun, Kimba the White Lion, Combattler V and several Tatsunoko productions including Kerokko Demetan, Dash Kappei, The Littl' Bits, and Okawari Boy Starzan S. Some sources, including The Anime Encyclopedia, erroneously claim that "Masayuki Hayashi" and "Rintaro" are one and the same.

== Filmography ==
=== Films ===
Year	Title	Director	Producer	Writer	Notes
1964	Mighty Atom, the Brave in Space	Yes	No	Yes	As Shigeyuki Hayashi
1979	Galaxy Express 999	Yes	No	No	
1981	Adieu Galaxy Express 999	Yes	No	No	
1983	Harmagedon	Yes	No	No	
1985	The Dagger of Kamui	Yes	Yes	No	
1986	Phoenix: Karma Chapter	Yes	Yes	No	
1986	Toki no Tabibito: Time Stranger	No	Yes	No	
1996	X	Yes	No	Yes	
2000	Reign: The Conqueror	Yes	Supervising	No	Co-directed with Yoshinori Kanemori
2001	Metropolis	Yes	No	No	
2009	Yona Yona Penguin	Yes	No	No	

=== Short films ===
Year	Title	Director	Writer	Notes
1978	Mystery of the Arcadia	Yes	No	
1987	Labyrinth Labyrinthos	Yes	Yes	Segment of Neo Tokyo
2023	Yamanaka Sadao ni Sasageru Manga Eiga 'Nezumikozō Jirokichi'	Yes	No	

=== Original video animation ===
Year	Title	Director	Writer	Notes
1987	Take the X Train	Yes	Yes	
1988	Bride of Deimos	Yes	No	
1988	Matasaburo of the Winds	Yes	Yes	
1988	Peacock King	Yes	No	
1991	Doomed Megalopolis	No	Yes	Episode 4: "The Battle for Tokyo"; Also chief director
1992	Download: Devil's Circuit	Yes	Yes	
1993	X² - Double X	Yes	No	
1994	Spirit Warrior	Yes	No	2 episodes
1994	Final Fantasy: Legend of the Crystals	Yes	No	4 episodes
2002	Space Pirate Captain Herlock: The Endless Odyssey	Yes	No	13 episodes

=== TV series ===
Year	Title	Director	Writer	Notes
1963	Astro Boy	Yes	No	Episode "Don Tay's Infernal Machine"
1965–1967	Kimba the White Lion	Yes	No	10 episodes
1968	Wanpaku Tanteidan	Yes	No	
1968	Sabu to Ichi Torimono Hikae	Yes	No	6 episodes
1969	Moomin	Yes	No	
1972	New Moomin	Yes	No	
1974	Hoshi no Ko Chobin	Yes	No	
1975	Wanpaku Omukashi Kumu Kumu	Yes	No	
1975–1977	Manga Nihon Mukashi Banashi	Yes	No	3 episodes; Co-directed with Mitsuo Kobayashi and Tsuneo Maeda
1976	UFO Warrior Dai Apolon	Yes	No	Episode "Invasion of the Demon Beast Bagladon from the Dark Nebula"
1977	Jetter Mars	Yes	No	27 episodes; Also producer
1977–1978	Arrow Emblem: Hawk of the Grand Prix	Yes	No	26 episodes
1978–1979	Space Pirate Captain Harlock	Yes	No	42 episodes
1980	Ganbare Genki	Yes	No	35 episodes
1982	Tiger Mask II	Yes	No	1 episode
1982	I Am a Cat	Yes	No	TV movie
1989	The Tezuka Osamu Story: I Am Son Goku	Yes	Yes	TV movie
1989	The New Adventures of Kimba The White Lion	Yes	No	
1989–1990	Dragon Quest	Yes	No	15 episodes
2005	Manga Entertainment: The Art of Anime	Yes	Yes	
2011	Wolverine	Yes	No	Episode "Mariko"; Co-directed with Hajime Ootani and Hiroshi Aoyama
2012	Lupin VIII	Yes	No	Pilot episode for a cancelled TV series. Released on home video in 2012.

== Books ==
- Galaxy Express 999 movie Storyboard (映画「銀河鉄道999」絵コンテ帳). Fukkan.com, 2019. ISBN 978-4835456409

== Honours ==
- Person of Cultural Merit (2026)
