= List of X chapters =

Cover for the Japanese's and English's first volumes from X. Besides changing its Japanese title, all English covers feature different illustrations.

The chapters of the Japanese manga series X, also known as X/1999 are written and illustrated by Clamp, a creative team of four manga authors. It started serialization in Kadokawa Shoten's Monthly Asuka manga magazine in May 1992. The story takes place at the end of days, in the year 1999. The series follows Kamui Shiro, a young esper who returns home to Tokyo after a six-year absence to face his destiny as the one who will determine humanity's fate.

Publishing the series in Japan proved troublesome on account of its disasters it shown which were reminiscent of ones that happened in Japan such as earthquakes or murders committed by juveniles. Serialization stopped in March 2003 and in March 2005 Clamp stated they were searching for a proper magazine to conclude it. The chapters have been collected in a total of eighteen tankōbon volumes with the first one released on July 29, 1992, and the eighteenth on September 17, 2002. On September 26, 2006, Kadokawa Shoten published Clamp Newtype Platinum, a special Clamp edition of Newtype. The issue includes the "X 18.5" supplement, a re-print of five previously uncollected chapters. These chapters were published in their own 19th tankōbon volume, entitled "Volume 18.5", on November 4, 2023. The series was originally expected to reach twenty-one volumes upon completion. The X manga has also been adapted into various anime, including a feature film, an original video animation and a TV series.

The North American version of the manga, retitled X/1999, was serialized in Viz Media's Animerica Extra and was released in individual volumes. In July 2001, Viz Media removed the series from Animerica Extra due to licensing issues, but it later returned in its issue published in March 2003. All of the eighteen completed volumes have been released by Viz Media as of May 10, 2005. By April 2010, manga editor Carl Gustav Horn Carl from Dark Horse Comics stated they would not license the series until it finished in Japan; Viz Media still maintains the licence to the English edition of X. In March 2011, Viz Media announced they would release an "omnibus" edition of the series which collects three volumes in one. Its first volume was published on November 7, 2011.

== Volumes list ==
No.	Title	Original release date	English release date
1	Prelude; Kōshi I (lit. "The Beginning I") (嚆矢 I)	July 29, 1992; 4-04-924306-7	April 30, 2003; 978-1569319499
"Prelude" (嚆矢 I, "Kōshi I"; lit. "The Beginning I")
After his mother's death, Kamui Shirō returns to his home, Tokyo. As he arrives, he destroys shikigami that attack him and is spyed by a woman known as Princess Hinoto. At school, Kamui starts ignoring his two childhood friends, the siblings Kotori and Fuma Monou, much to the former's sadness. Kamui is later spyed by Hinoto's bodyguard, Daisuke Saiki. Kamui attempts to kill Saiki, who is rescued by Arashi Kishū, a girl allied with Hinoto. Hinoto states she saw Kamui in a dream about how Earth's fate will be decided, and still wants to keep an eye on him. Suffering various cuts due to Saiki's attack, Kamui faints and is rescued by Fūma. After a doctor treats Kamui, Fūma leaves him in Kotori's care while two other people spying Kamui, Sorata Arisugawa and Yūto Kigai, start fighting to get their chance to contact him.
2	Overture; Kōshi II (lit. "The Beginning II") (嚆矢 II)	November 28, 1992; 4-04-924323-7	May 2003; 978-1569319505
"Overture" (嚆矢 II, "Kōshi II"; lit. "The Beginning II")
Fūma accidentally enters in the barrier that Sorata created to avoid damage to the surroundings, the battle to be postponed. Hinoto manages to enter in Kamui's dream and tells him if he does not save Earth, Kotori will die. Kamui threatens to kill Hinoto if she attacks his friends, and the dream ends. Kamui is greeted by Sorata, who states how the Mount Kōya monks predicted he would return to Tokyo after his mother's death, but Kamui still does not understand why he left Tokyo. Meanwhile, Fūma's and Kotori's father, Kyōgo Monou, is attacked by Nataku, a teenager known as a "Dragon of Earth" who steals the Sacred Sword Kyōgo has been keeping for Kamui. After Nataku escapes, a dying Kyōgo tells Kamui to recover the sword and tells Fūma something unknown.
3	Sonata; Shichiyō I (lit. "The Seven Stars I") (七曜 I)	January 29, 1993; 4-04-924338-5	July 16, 2003; 978-1569319666
"Sonata" (七曜 I, "Shichiyō I"; lit. "The Seven Stars I")
Hinoto has a dream in which two Kamuis fight, which also alerts Kanoe, a woman able to see her dreams and allied with Yūto. Another of Kanoe's companions, Satsuki Yatōji, learns that the Sacred Sword was stolen by Nataku and tells it to Kanoe. Kamui and Sorata are found by Kamui's aunt, Tokiko Magami who tells him how her sister Tōru Shirō gave birth to Kamui for Earth's safety. Meanwhile, Arashi is attacked by shikigami sent by the group known as Dragons of Earth, and destroys them with help from a man named Seiichirō Aoki. Kamui and Sorata go to where Arashi is, while Tokiko disappears from her house which is burned. Meanwhile, Fūma starts experiencing dreams in which Kanoe tells him that Kamui will kill Kotori in his way to destroy Earth and Fūma has to stop him.
4	Intermezzo; Shichiyō II (lit. "The Seven Stars II") (七曜 II)	June 2, 1993; 4-04-924358-X	August 2003; 978-1569319673
"Intermezzo" (七曜 II, "Shichiyō II"; lit. "The Seven Stars II")
Kamui reveals that Tōru was incinerated, which Sorata and Arashi speculate was avoid a misery meant to fall to somebody thanks to the abilities from the Magami clan. Sorata convinces Arashi to take them to Hinoto's hideout in the National Diet Building, to learn more about Kamui's role. In the hideout, Hinoto shows Kamui the future she saw in which the Dragons of Earth will confront the Dragons of Heaven to destroy Earth. As Tokyo possesses a barrier that protects Earth, the seven Dragons of Heaven be its seven seals with Kamui leading them. When Kanoe appears in the dream telling Kamui he can also become the Dragons of Earth's leader, Hinoto ends the dream. Meanwhile, Kotori is attacked by "Beast", a machine controlled by Satsuki, but it is stopped by Kusanagi Shiyū, a man investigating Kamui.
5	Serenade; Shichiyō III (lit. "The Seven Stars III") (七曜 III)	November 2, 1993; 4-04-924388-1	October 1, 2003; 978-1591160793
"Serenade" (七曜 III, "Shichiyō III"; lit. "The Seven Stars III"); "X/1999 - Sorata Arisugawa" (エックス - 有洙川 空汰, "Ekkusu - Arisugawa Sorata")
Dragon of Heaven Yuzuriha Nekoi comes to Hinoto's hideout, introducing herself to the others Dragons of Heaven. However, the hideout soon comes under attack by an illusion, forcing Sorata, Arashi, Yuzuriha and Kamui to break it. Kamui leaves after Hinoto states that what Kanoe said was true, and that his choice will impact Earth's fate. Kamui meets with Kotori and considers her possible death while Sorata and Arashi spy on him. Sorata reveals to Arashi that it has been foreordained that he would serve Kamui, but die for a woman, whom he chose as Arashi. The two are contacted by the Dragon of Heaven Karen Kasumi, who tells them that Tokiko was kidnapped and wanted to tell Kamui something. Kamui later remembers that Tōru said Kotori's and Fūma's mother, Saya Monou, died at her place in relation to the Sacred Sword and how she told him he could change fate. The volume includes a chapter on how Sorata was told by the monks of Mount Kouya about his destiny.
6	Duet; Shichiyō IV (lit. "The Seven Stars IV") (七曜 IV)	December 7, 1994; 4-04-924420-9	November 30, 2000; 978-1569314746
"Duet" (七曜 IV, "Shichiyō IV"; lit. "The Seven Stars IV"); "X/1999 - Yuzuriha Nekoi" (エックス - 猫依 護刃, "Ekkusu - Nekoi Yuzuriha")
Kamui and Kotori are attacked by the assassin Seishirō Sakurazuka, who ambushed him in Hinoto's hideout. Unable to fight him while protecting Kotori, Kamui is saved by Fūma, who unconsciously breaks Seishirō's illusion, causing him to escape. Fūma takes Kamui and Kotori to his house, wanting to know what is happening with him, but suffers from a change of personality. Kotori has Hinoto's dream in which she sees the two Kamuis and that her death will cause the Earth to be destroyed. A wounded Tokiko appears at Fūma's house, telling Kamui she will die to give birth to another Sacred Sword like Saya did six years ago in Tōru's place. Tokiko's body is suddenly lacerated as the second Sacred Sword appears. The volume includes a chapter on how Yuzuriha arrived to Tokyo with hopes somebody would see her inugami Inuki and Kusanagi was the first person to see it.
7	Rhapsody; Shinken I (lit. "Holy Sword I") (神剣 I)	October 17, 1995; 4-04-924543-4	November 26, 2003; 978-1591161219
"Rhapsody" (神剣 I, "Shinken I"; lit. "Holy Sword I"); "X/1999 - Satsuki Yatōji" (エックス - 八頭司 颯姫, "Ekkusu - Yatōji Satsuki")
Kotori sees Tokiko's remains and is traumatized as she remembers Saya's death, while Fūma has another change of personality. Kotori meets Saya in a dream and suffers another shock when she learns that Saya did not love her husband, Kyogo, before she is rescued by the Dragon of Earth Kakyō Kuzuki. Having also seen the future, Kakyō states that another "Kamui" will soon awaken. Meanwhile, Seishirō destroys one of Tokyo's barriers, the Nakano Sun Plaza, as one of the Dragons of Earth starting an earthquake. Fūma returns to normal, while Kotori collapses. Kanoe sees Kotori's dream and tells Hinoto that her death will also impact Earth's future. The volume includes a chapter on how Satsuki's past and how she learned she was a Dragon of Earth as she communicated with a computer and how she killed the people retaining her in order to meet Kamui.
8	Crescendo; Shinken II (lit. "Holy Sword II") (神剣 II)	June 14, 1996; 4-04-924598-1	November 26, 2003; 978-1591161226
"Crescendo" (神剣 II, "Shinken II"; lit. "Holy Sword II"); "X/1999 - Nataku" (エックス - 那吒, "Ekkusu - Nataku")
Kamui is visited by a member from the Clamp Campus who were asked by Tokiko to hide her Sacred Sword. Saiki takes Yuzuriha to meet the Dragon of Heaven Seiichirō Aoki in order to reunite all the Dragons of Heaven. The last Dragon of Heaven, the onmyōji Subaru Sumeragi, confronts Seishirō as he has been searching for him ever since he killed his twin sister, Hokuto Sumeragi. Being only an illusion, Seishirō disappears and Subaru is contacted by Sorata and Arashi. In the Clamp Campus, Kamui sees Tokiko's testament in which she reveals that his destiny is entirely his choice and he must choose what is important to him: to become a Dragon of Heaven and protect mankind from being annihilated, or a Dragon of Earth to bring a change to Earth. When Kamui realizes his wish is to save Kotori and Fūma, it causes the latter to become the Dragons of Earth's "Kamui" as Fūma was born to be his opposite. Having awakened as Kamui's opposite number, Fūma tortures Kamui and kills Kotori. The volume ends with Nataku experiencing memories from the young girl he was cloned from, causing him to think of Fūma as his father.
9	Requiem; Kamui I (神威 I)	January 16, 1997; 4-04-924640-6	March 24, 2004; 978-1591163411
"Requiem" (神威 I, "Kamui I"; lit. "Kamui I"); "X/1999 - Kusanagi Shiyū" (エックス - 志勇 草薙, "Ekkusu - Shiyū Kusanagi")
Fūma tries to kill Kamui, but escapes when Kotori's corpse is possessed by Kakyō and the other Dragons of Heaven arrive. Kotori disappears from Kakyō's dream happy that Kamui did not die, and saying that destiny can be changed. Kotori's death leaves Kamui catatonic, and Subaru uses a spell to contact his mind. Subaru tells Kamui how he also suffered catatonia which made him unable to save Hokuto from Seishirō, whom he loved. As Subaru states he accepted reality in order to grant his wish, Kamui decides to do the same bring back Fūma's old personality. After Kamui wakes up, all the Dragons of Heaven reunite, and Kamui decides to hide the Sacred Sword after Karen gives him message from Tokiko's last message. Meanwhile, Fūma finds Kakyō in a comatose state and convinces him join him as a Dragon of Earth in exchange of granting his wish of dying. The volume includes a chapter detailing how Kusanagi met Yuzuriha and how Kusanagi understands the feelings from nature.
10	Fugue; Yumemi (lit. "The Dreamgazer") (夢見)	September 17, 1997; 4-04-924688-0	December 10, 2002; 978-1569318966
"Fugue" (夢見, "Yumemi"; lit. "The Dreamgazer"); "X/1999 - Arashi Kishū" (エックス - 鬼咒 嵐, "Ekkusu - Kishū Arashi")
Kamui seals Tokiko's Sacred Sword in an underground room from the Clamp Campus, while Nataku takes Saya's Sacred Sword and leaves his creators. Fūma takes Kakyō goes to Kanoe's hideout and is followed by Nataku, Kusanagi and Seishirō. When Kamui approaches Hinoto to learn about Tōru's death, she shows him that after Tōru left Tokyo with Kamui, Saya died to create the first Sacred Sword which caused the birth of Fūma's alter ego who remained hidden until Kamui became a Dragon of Heaven. She shows how Tōru incinerated herself to prevent Earth's destruction due to global warming. Waking up, Kamui realizes he is going against his mother's wishes, but still decides to be a Dragon of Heaven to bring back Fūma, who has united with all of the Dragons of Earth. The volume includes a chapter detailing Arashi's childhood when she decided to continue living after her mother's death and learned of her destiny.
11	Interlude; Kekkai I (結界 I)	September 14, 1998; 4-04-924748-8	October 8, 2003; 978-1569318973
"Interlude" (結界 I, "Kekkai I"); "X/1999 - Subaru Sumeragi" (エックス - 皇 昴流, "Ekkusu - Sumeragi Subaru")
Three months after Kotori's death, Kamui is now living with Sorata, Arashi and Yuzuriha on Clamp Campus. Meanwhile, Fūma is now with Kakyō and Nataku, with the latter addressing him as his father. Nataku assists Fūma to destroy another barrier, the skyscraper Sunshine 60, where Nataku hesitates to kill his creator. Though Kamui goes to confront them, he is unable to create a barrier to protect the area and the people around. As Kamui is beaten up by Fūma, Subaru appears in the area to save the former while creating a barrier. The volume includes a chapter on one of Subaru's jobs as an onmyōji and how it relates to his own attachment to Seishirō.
12	Movement; Kekkai II (結界 II)	March 17, 1999; 4-04-924770-4	November 26, 2003; 978-1591160786
"Movement" (結界 II, "Kekkai II"); "X/1999 - Seiichirō Aoki" (エックス - 蒼軌 征一狼, "Ekkusu - Aoki Seiichirō")
Fūma attacks Subaru to destroy his barrier, leaving Kamui to Nataku. Overwhelming Subaru in combat, Fūma leaves him near dead, destroying its barrier. After Sunshine 60 collapses, Subaru is hospitalized, claiming that Fūma granted his wish of losing his right eye's vision. Kamui is depressed about not being able to protect anybody, but is comforted by Sorata and Yuzuriha. He goes to Hinoto to learn how to create a barrier, and Saiki tells him Aoki said that he created barriers wishing to protect others. When visiting Nataku's creator, Kamui also learns that Nataku was cloned from his deceased granddaughter, who was destined to be a Dragon of Earth. While meeting Kusanagi, Yuzuriha senses Satsuki attacking Nishi-Shinjuku with Beast and goes to confront her. The volume includes a chapter on how Aoki, before he was married, trained Saiki, who wished to protect Hinoto.
13	Lament; Kekkai III (結界 III)	August 19, 1999; 4-04-924788-7	January 28, 2004; 978-1591161202
"Lament" (結界 III, "Kekkai III"); "X/1999 - Karen Kasumi" (エックス - 夏澄 火煉, "Ekkusu - Kasumi Karen")
Beast kills Inuki when it tries to protect Yuzuriha, while Yuzuriha is rescued by Kusanagi. Kamui goes to where she is as the barrier is broken, but he finds that Fūma has decapitated Saiki. A furious Kamui attacks Fūma, but finds himself unwilling to kill him. Fūma tortures Kamui, but leaves when Sorata and Arashi arrive. The two evacuate with Kamui just as Shinjuku is destroyed due to the lack of barriers. Hinoto and Aoki are saddened by Saiki's death, while Yuzuriha recovers in a hospital. When the Yamanote Line is attacked, Karen drugs Aoki to go defend the barrier alone, as Aoki's death would affect his family. In the rail lines, Karen overpowers Nataku, but spares him as she is attacked by Yūto. As a weakened Aoki comes to Karen's aid, Yūto decides to postpone the battle as he leaves with Nataku. The volume includes a chapter on how Karen was emotionally abused by her mother, who believed that Karen's powers were demonic and tried desperately to prevent Karen from being used by fanatics, before she died in a car accident.
14	Concerto; Kekkai IV (結界 IV)	February 22, 2000; 4-04-924804-2	May 5, 2004; 978-1591162049
"Concerto" (結界 IV, "Kekkai IV"); "X/1999 - Yūto Kigai" (エックス - 麒飼 遊人, "Ekkusu - Kigai Yūto")
In a dream, Kakyō tells Kamui he will be able to bring Fūma back with the Sacred Sword although he already saw what would be the fight's outcome. In another dream, Kamui contacts Hinoto trying to apologize for Saiki's death, but he senses another person within her. After telling Kakyō if the future changes, his wish will not be granted, Fūma destroys the barriers from the Ebisu Garden Place and the Yamanote Line with Seishirō's help. As Nataku destroys another barrier, a tormented Hinoto starts to be possessed by her alternate self and wants Kamui to kill her as she saw in her visions. The volume includes a chapter on Yūto, who goes on a date with Satsuki and confesses he does not care about the fight's outcome.
15	Waltz; Kekkai V (結界 V)	August 17, 2000; 4-04-924825-5	August 17, 2004; 1-59116-349-8
"Waltz" (結界 V, "Kekkai V"); "X/1999 - Kakyō Kuzuki" (エックス - 玖月 牙暁, "Ekkusu - Kuzuki Kakyō")
Kakyō remembers how he met Hokuto in a dream when he lived imprisoned and wished to go outside with her. Ignoring Kusanagi's position as a Dragon of Earth, Yuzuriha confesses she is in love with him. Though he does not reciprocate her feelings, they both still decide to remain in touch. When Yuzuriha finds Fūma trying to destroy another barrier, Kamui comes to help her. As Kamui battles Fūma, he is overpowered again until Yuzuriha manifests another inugami to save him. Fūma escapes, leaving the area safe. Now possessed by her other self, Hinoto contacts Kamui, Yuzuriha, Sorata, and Arashi and directs them to the Yasukuni Shrine as she says the Dragons of Earth will attack them, but later sends Subaru to Tokyo's Rainbow Bridge. The volume includes a chapter on how Kakyō foresaw Hokuto's death, but was unable to save her, as he was shot by the organization that imprisoned him.
16	Nocturne; Kekkai VI (結界 VI)	March 17, 2001; 4-04-924857-3	November 17, 2004; 1-59116-596-2
"Nocturne" (結界 VI, "Kekkai VI"); "X/1999 - Seishirō Sakurazuka" (エックス - 桜塚 星史郎, "Ekkusu - Sakurazuka Seishirō")
In the Rainbow Bridge, Subaru is confronted by Seishirō. As both onmyōji battle, Seishirō asks Subaru if his wish is getting revenge. Seishirō attacks Subaru, but Hokuto's dying spell reverses the situation, and Subaru ends impaling Seishirō. A shocked Subaru confesses his wish was to be killed by Seishirō, who dies after telling him something unknown. Seishirō's death causes Subaru to lose his ability to create barriers, causing the Rainbow Bridge to be destroyed. After the bridge's fall, Subaru leaves his companions, and almost all Tokyo is evacuated. The remaining Dragons of Heaven pair off to protect Tokyo, with Kamui and Sorata in one group and Arashi and Yuzuriha in another. In Inokashira Park, Arashi and Yuzuriha are attacked by Satsuki. The volume includes a chapter on Seishirō's past, where he killed his mother to succeed her as the Sakurazuka's assassin.
17	Suite; Shūmatsu I (lit. "The End I") (終末 I)	November 17, 2001; 4-04-924882-4	February 15, 2005; 1-59116-682-9
"Suite" (終末 I, "Shūmatsu I"; lit. "The End I"); "X/1999 - Kamui Shirō + Fūma Monou" (エックス - 司狼 神威 + 桃生 封真, "Ekkusu - Shirō Kamui + Monou Fūma")
Satsuki attacks Arashi and Yuzuriha with Beast to destroy the barrier at Inokashira Park. When Hinoto insists that Kamui and Sorata should not join them, Kamui realizes that she created the shikigami that ambushed him and Tokiko and secretly reveals his suspicions to Sorata. As Beast is about to kill Arashi, a gohoudouji spirit created by Sorata protects her. While Satsuki retreats thinking Arashi was killed, Sorata appears sustaining the wounds taken by the gohoudouji. After sending him to the hospital, Arashi reproaches Sorata for sacrificing himself for her, and ends confessing she is in love with him. Aoki and Karen go to Ginza in the other Dragons' place after being informed by Hinoto's other self. Meanwhile, Fūma gives Subaru Seishirō's left eye, stating he can grant Seishirō and recover his vision, but at the same time he would have to become a Dragon of Earth. The volume includes a chapter on Kamui and Fūma's first meeting and how they became friends.
18	Inversion; Shūmatsu II (lit. "The End II") (終末 II)	September 17, 2002; 4-04-924892-1	May 10, 2005; 1-59116-782-5
"Inversion" (終末 II, "Shūmatsu II"; lit. "The End II")
Nataku attacks Karen and Aoki in Ginza, but fails on purpose. When Karen talks to Nataku, Nataku reveals it wants her to leave the area so that she will not die. She learns that Nataku stole the Sacred Sword as his grandfather wanted him to avoid the battle for Earth's fate, but Nataku only wants to be with Fūma. When Fūma appears and attacks Nataku and Karen, he forces Nataku to realize what is his wish. As Fūma tries to kills Karen, Nataku dies at her place as he wished to protect the one he considered his mother dying at the hands of the one he considered his father. An angered Karen tries to kill Fūma, who decides to leave her per Nataku's wish. Later, Arashi realizes she lost her powers as a Dragon of Heaven after consummating her relationship with Sorata, and leaves the group. Kamui visits Karen after Nataku's burial, and grows more suspicious about Hinoto's actions when talking to her.

== X 18.5 ==
Originally published in the Newtype, Clamp's latest chapters of X written before the series was put on hiatus were collected in both the magazine as well and the guidebook All About Clamp. Volume 18.5 was released as a stand-alone volume as part of the Clamp Premium Collection version of the series on November 4, 2023.

No.	Title	Japanese release date	Japanese ISBN
"18.5"	Shūmatsu III (lit. "The End III") (終末 III)	November 4, 2023	4-04-113351-3
終末 III ("Shūmatsu III", lit. "The End III")
With Tokyo mostly sunken, Kamui and Fuma unseal their Sacred Swords to prepare for their final battle. Sorata learns of Hinoto's dark personality being responsible for taking Arashi to turn her into a Dragon of Earth. In a dream, Kanoe approaches and sees two images of Hinoto, but is killed soon afterward, with Kamui having a vision of Fuma being the murderer. Kamui, Yuzuriha, Aoki, and Karen confront Fuma, who is accompanied by Subaru. During Kamui's battle with his old friend, he claims that his wish is recovering the original Fuma. As Kamui is overpowered, Subaru tells him that he must realize what is his true wish.
