= List of X episodes =

X
- DVD box from X released by Funimation Entertainment on August 25, 2015
- No. of episodes: 24

Release
- Original network: Wowow
- Original release: October 3, 2001 – March 27, 2002

X is a 24-episode anime television series, based on Clamp's manga series of the same name. The series was produced by Madhouse and directed by Yoshiaki Kawajiri, being first announced by the manga artists group on October 18, 2000. The story takes place at the end of days, in the year 1999. The series follows Kamui Shiro, a young esper who returns home to Tokyo after a six-year absence to face his destiny as the one who will determine humanity's fate.

The script was handled by Hiroko Tokita, Kazuyuki Fudeyasu, Kenji Sugihara and Yuki Enatsu. Koshinori Kanemori adapted Clamp's character designs and served as art director alongside Yuji Ikeda. Clamp headwriter Nanase Ohkawa stated the manga group left everything in the hands of staff in charge for it, including the scripts, the cast choices and everything else. As a result, Ohkawa considered herself and her colleagues as viewers. They found the television series as a proper adaptation of the manga even though the source material never reached its ending.

In anticipation to the series premiere, an original video animation (OVA) was produced: An Omen (予兆, Yochō). It was directed-to-DVD on August 25, 2001. Written and directed by Kawajiri, the OVA tells the story of the upcoming battles through the prophecies of Kakyō Kuzuki, dreamgazer for the organization Dragon of Earth, and acts as primer for viewers not familiar with Clamp's manga. The series premiered on October 3, 2001, on Wowow satellite television and finished on March 27, 2002, totaling twenty-four episodes. A total of twelve DVD volumes from the series, each containing two episodes, were released in Japan from February 25, 2001, to January 25, 2002, by Bandai Visual.

The series was first licensed in North America by Pioneer Entertainment in March 2002. Geneon collected the series and the OVA in a total of eight DVD volumes released between September 24, 2002, and November 25, 2003. Two DVD box sets of the series were also released on January 11, 2005. In 2006, Geneon released the X TV Series Re-Mix, which was composed of five individual DVDs released between July 11, 2006, and November 14, 2006, as well as a DVD box set on July 11, 2006. The DVDs came with re-mastered video and audio, including remixed 5.1 Dolby Digital AC3 surround sound for both the Japanese and English tracks. In September 2009, Funimation Entertainment announced that it had acquired the rights to the anime series and OVA. They were re-released them in a DVD box it on June 15, 2010, using the original Geneon dubbing (provided by Bang Zoom! Entertainment) for the English-language audio track. The series was also streamed in Hulu in 2010 by Funimation.

The music for the series was composed by Naoki Satō with two original soundtracks being released. The TV series uses two theme songs: "eX Dream" by Masatoshi Nishimura (credited as "Myuji") is used as the opening theme, while "Secret Sorrow" by Kohei Koizumi is used as the ending theme. The OVA's ending theme is "Strength" by Kouhei Koizumi.

== Episode list ==
No.	Title	Directed by	Written by	Original release date
0	"An Omen"; Transliteration: "Yochō" (Japanese: 予兆)	Takuji Endō	Yoshiaki Kawajiri	August 25, 2001 (DVD)
Kakyō Kuzuki states that thanks to his ability to see the future through dreams, he always knew that there would be "two Kamuis" who would fight to decide Earth's fate. However, he does not care about anymore as he failed to save the woman he loved, Hokuto Sumeragi, after foreseeing her death. When trying to stop her, Kakyō was shot by the organization that kept him prisoner and ended in a coma. Before that, Kakyō met Hokuto through a dream, and she invited him to go see the sea with him. The first encounters between the Dragons of Heaven and Dragon of Earth are shown, with Kakyō from being the latter. He remembers how he talked with the young Kotori Monou through a dream. Kotori wanted to him to tell the two people she loves that the destiny still was not decided. Kotori's words brought hope to Kakyō who wishes she is right and wishes the time in which he will join Hokuto will come.
1	"A Reunion"; Transliteration: "Saikai" (Japanese: 再会)	Hideo Hayashi	Yoshiaki Kawajiri	October 3, 2001
As a total of seven people go to Tokyo, a girl known as Princess Hinoto states that six of them are known as the Dragons of Heaven whose actions are meant to determinate the Earth's fate. The seventh person, a guy known as Kamui Shiro, attacks the guardian of the Tokagushi Temple, Kyōgo Monou, to take the sacred sword that has been kept there. The fight's outcome is unknown as in the next day Kyōgo appears safe while Kamui is ambushed by shikigami disguised as men attacking him. After eliminating them with his psychic powers, Kamui goes to school where Kyōgo's daughter, Kotori, recognizes Kamui as her childhood friend. Kotori tries to greet Kamui, but he tells her not to be with him. As Kotori leaves him, Kamui forces Hinoto to stop using her powers to spy him.
2	"A Nightmare"; Transliteration: "Yumemi" (Japanese: 夢見)	Kōji Aritomi	Yoshiaki Kawajiri	October 10, 2001
Kotori reflects on how Kamui has changed from when he has a child and risked his life to save her when she fell from a tree. That night, Kamui attacks Daisuke Saiki, a wind magician who has also been spying him to see if he is the chosen one seen by Hinoto. When being about to be interrogated by Kamui, Saiki is rescued by Arashi Kishū, a girl who is a Dragon of Heaven. Saiki is taken to Hinoto who states that she had a dream from the future in which Kamui was battling in an apocalyptic Tokyo. Later that night, Sorata Arisugawa, another Dragon of Heaven trying to contact Kamui confronts another spy, Yūto Kigai. Kotori's older brother, Fuma Monou, unconsciously enters into the battle's barrier designed by Sorata, causing the two of them to stop battling. Fūma saw Kamui wounded due to Saiki's attack and finds him unconscious in his house.
3	"A Pledge"; Transliteration: "Yakusoku" (Japanese: 約束)	Kō Matsuo	Yoshiaki Kawajiri	October 17, 2001
After treating Kamui's wounds, Fūma leaves him in Sorata's care. Sorata tells Kamui how the Mount Kōya monks raised him to assist him in the fight to decide Earth's fate, but Kamui makes him escape when Sorata states that the monks also predicted he would come to Tokyo after losing his family. The next day, Kyōgo recalls that the sacred sword was actually "born" from his wife, Saya Monou, who died during its creation. Kamui gets in contact with Kotori and Fūma, telling the latter not to get close to him again. Just then, Kyōgo is attacked by Nataku, a teenager who introduces himself as a Dragon of Earth. After Nataku steals the sacred sword, Fūma and Kotori hear him and run to Kyōgo. Kamui pursues Nataku but fails to stop him as Sorata comments the monks also predicted that.
4	"A Sacrifice"; Transliteration: "Kagenie" (Japanese: 影贄)	Jun Shishido	Yoshiaki Kawajiri	October 24, 2001
Hinoto has a dream in which two Kamuis fight with sacred swords which starts concerning her as well as Kanoe, a woman able to spy dreams and allied with Yūto. Meanwhile, the group of scientists that created Nataku is investigating the sacred sword stolen. In a hospital, Kyōgo is safe but still unconscious due to Nataku's attack. As Kamui confesses to Sorata that he wanted the sacred sword so that Kyōgo would not be killed by others wanting it, he is approached by his aunt Tokiko Magami who wishes to tell him the reason why Kamui's mother, Tōru Shirō, died. Tokiko reveals that Tōru sacrificed herself to postpone a disaster that would happen to Kamui thanks to the abilities from the Magami clan. Kamui and Sorata leave her as the latter senses that Arashi is fighting shikigami from the Dragons of Earth. Arashi manages to defeat her opponents with help from the Dragon of Heaven Seiichirō Aoki, but she is then convinced by Sorata to lead him and Kamui to Hinoto.
5	"A Destiny"; Transliteration: "Shukumei" (Japanese: 宿命)	Hidekazu Satō	Yoshiaki Kawajiri	October 31, 2001
Dragon of Heaven Yuzuriha Nekoi comes to Tokyo to confront her destiny and with hopes that people will see her inugami Inuki which is invisible to most people. Meanwhile, Arashi takes Kamui and Sorata to Hinoto, who wishes to talk to Kamui. Hinoto shows Kamui her dream involving him fighting as the leader from the Dragons of Heaven to protect Earth from the Dragons of Earth who oppose them. Hinoto's sister, Kanoe, appears in the dream, revealing that Hinoto was hiding another possible future in which Kamui would lead the Dragons of Earth. As the dream ends, Kamui mistrusts Hinoto for how the sacred sword was not given to him and caused Kyōgo to be attacked by Nataku. Yuzuriha arrives and introduces herself to the group, happy they can see Inuki. They are then attacked by an illusion created by an assassin from the Sakurazuka assassin, but upon its destruction, Kamui leaves them.
6	"Kouya"; Transliteration: "Kōya" (Japanese: 高野)	Hideo Hayashi	Yoshiaki Kawajiri	November 7, 2001
Kamui goes to visit Kyōgo, but he ends accompanying Kotori to her home when she collapses after remembering her mother's death. The next day, Sorata and Arashi spy Kamui who went to watch Fūma's basketball match. As both discuss, Sorata confesses to Arashi that he has chosen her to be the woman he would risk his life for. As Arashi is confused by such state, Sorata explains that when he lived in Mount Kōya, it was prophesied he was meant to support Kamui in Earth's battle, but he would die for a woman. By then, Beast, a machine controlled by the Dragon of Earth Satsuki Yatōji attacks Sorata and Arashi with its electrical wires, but the two manage to destroy them. In the outcome Sorata is wounded when protecting Arashi, but is happy as he states the woman he chose is the most beautiful one he has ever seen.
7	"Civer"; Transliteration: "Dennō" (Japanese: 電脳)	Yasuhiro Matsumura	Yoshiaki Kawajiri	November 14, 2001
After staying connected to Beast for a long time to help Kanoe, Satsuki goes to ride on bicycle. Outside, she starts being chased by a black car as she remembers her childhood: When Satsuki was a primary school student, her father discovered her abilities to communicate to computers and sent her to an organization that wanted to use her. Satsuki disliked her treatment, and only liked how the computer was able to tell her her fate as one of the Dragons of the Earth. She then used the computer to hack the traffic lights and cause a car accident that caused her father's death. When escaping from the organization, Kanoe took her to her group as Satsuki liked how she treated her. After the flashback ends, Satsuki confronts the organization's members who want her back. However, most of them are killed by Yūto who takes Satsuki back to Kanoe to reveal the information she found from Nataku.
8	"Gemini" (Japanese: 添星)	Takuji Endō	Yoshiaki Kawajiri	November 21, 2001
Yūto remembers how Fūma entered into Sorata's barrier, which attracts Kanoe. As his condition gets worse, Kyōgo tells Fūma he is Kamui's "twin star" just before his death. Kamui goes to Kyōgo's funeral, where the Dragon of Heaven Karen Kasumi gives him a message from Tokiko that he will soon obtain another sacred sword. Kamui later talks with Kotori, but both of them are sent to a cliff by Seishirō Sakurazuka, the Sakurazuka assassin. Kamui is unable to face Seishirō while protecting Kotori, and he is saved by Fūma, who breaks Seishirō's illusion while trying to protect him. As Seishirō leaves, Kamui gives an unconscious Kotori to Fūma and starts wondering if Fūma is changing. Later, Kanoe enters in Hinoto's dream, telling her that her dream of the two Kamuis means there are two of them in reality, with the one she has not met being Kamui's twin star who has yet to awake.
9	"Onmyou"; Transliteration: "Onmyō" (Japanese: 陰陽)	Hiroshi Hamasaki	Kenji Sugihara	November 28, 2001
After studying from where the Dragons of Heaven have come so far, Sorata speculates that another one may be Subaru Sumeragi, the leader from the Sumeragi clan. He and Arashi go search for him, while Subaru is working as an onmyoji, exorcising evil spirits. Subaru remembers how he had close relationship with his twin sister, Hokuto Sumeragi, and Seishirō years ago. At some moment, Seishirō killed Hokuto who wanted to prevent him to kill Subaru, and Subaru has been searching for him for the last years. In the job, Subaru finds and confronts Seishirō, who acknowledges him as a Dragon of the Heaven, but disappears as he was an illusion. Sorata and Arashi then find Subaru, but he ignores them as has yet to finish his job of exorcising a resurrected person.
10	"Inuki" (Japanese: 犬鬼)	Kōji Aritomi	Yoshiaki Kawajiri	December 5, 2001
Saiki contacts Yuzuriha to accompany him find his uncle, Seiichirō Aoki, in order to start reuniting the Dragons of Heaven. As Aoki is late, Saiki stays at the appointment place while Inuki finds Kusanagi Shiyū, the first man who saw it in Tokyo, and Yuzuriha wished to see again. Yuzuriha starts talking to him, and wants to explain him why she was happy he could see Inuki. When Yuzuriha was in Primary, most of her classmates called her liar as they did not see Inuki. Trying to prove Inuki existed, Yuzuriha took some of them to waterfall found only by Inuki. In the way, one of the kids was wounded and so they stopped and Yuzuriha was once again ignored. Kusanagi states that it only matters if Yuzuriha believes in Inuki and promises to see her again. Aoki then invites Saiki and Yuzuriha to eat, and promises he will join the Dragons of Heaven.
11	"Border"; Transliteration: "Kyōkai" (Japanese: 境界)	Jun Takada	Yoshiaki Kawajiri	December 12, 2001
Kotori has a dream in which Kamui and Fūma try to kill each other, and tells it to the latter. A worried Fūma tells Kamui he also had the same nightmare, and requests him to tell him why he left Tokyo six years ago. Kamui says that after Saya died, his mother Tōru took him to Okinawa where Kamui started experiencing his psychic powers. Tōru told Kamui that such powers could be used to protect the ones he cared, and Kamui wished to protect Kotoi and Fūma. As Kamui grew lonely, one night Tōru incinerated herself in a barrier and told Kamui to return to Tokyo. After Fūma hears that, he makes Kamui promise he will stay with him and Kotori no matter the danger involved. Kamui then destroys shikigami that pursued Tokiko to the temple, and Tokiko tells him she will give die giving birth to another sacred sword in Tōru's place. Tokiko's body then explodes, leaving the new sacred sword covered by her blood.
12	"Alternative"; Transliteration: "Sentaku" (Japanese: 選択)	Masahiko Ohta	Yoshiaki Kawajiri	December 19, 2001
Kotori sees Tokiko's blood and suffers a mental shock remembering Saya's death. A member from the Clamp Academy arrives and takes Kotori to treatment stating he promised Tokiko to protect her sacred sword. Kotori then enters into a dream and meets a man known as Kakyō Kuzuki who also had the dream in which Kamui and Fūma battled. Later, Kamui sees Tokiko's testament that tells him that if he wishes to protect humanity he will become a Dragon of Heaven, but on the other hand, if he wants to destroy the Earth and start over again, he will become a Dragon of Earth. Kamui concludes he only cares about Kotori's and Fūma's safety, not mankind's or Earth's. Fūma then attacks Kamui, telling him that as he unconsciously became a Dragon of Heaven, he became the "Kamui" from the Dragons of Earth to destroy mankind. Having also developed psychic powers, Fūma destroys the building and kills Kotori. While Fūma is trying to kill Kamui, Kakyō possesses Kotori's corpse and takes a hold of the sacred sword. Fūma escapes upon Sorata's, Arashi's and Subaru's arrival, while Kotori disappears from Kakyō's dream, happy that Kamui did not die.
13	"Return"; Transliteration: "Kakusei" (Japanese: 覚醒)	Haruo Sotozaki	Yoshiaki Kawajiri	January 9, 2002
After Kotori's death, Kamui has fallen into catatonia state. Fūma manages to find Kakyō and convinces him to work as a Dragon of Earth in exchange of granting his wish, which is dying. Fūma then takes Kakyō to Kanoe's hideout, where the two are accepted. Back in the academy, Subaru decides to use a spell from the Sumeragi clan to connect his mind with Kamui's and talk with him. As he performs, Subaru's mind is attacked the scared mind from Kamui, who appears as a child. When Kamui is calmed, Subaru tells him he is rejecting reality and if does not wake up, he will never finish what he wants to do. Subaru shows him how in his memory, he also became once catatonic which caused him to be unable to save Hokuto from dying. Because of Hokuto's death, Subaru accepted reality in order to try grant his own wish. Kamui then decides he wants Fūma recover his old self, and manages to wake up.
14	"Gathering"; Transliteration: "Shūketsu" (Japanese: 集結)	Shigeru Kimiya	Yoshiaki Kawajiri	January 16, 2002
After awakening, Kamui says goodbye to Kotori and all the other six Dragons of Heavens also visit her burial place. Kamui apologizes to Sorata, stating he will now trust his partners. He is then taken to the underground level from the academy where Kamui is supposed to seal the sacred sword until the final battle for Earth's fate. As he does it, the other sacred sword awakes Nataku, who decides to leave alongside the sword. Kamui then visits Hinoto, asking her if she had foreseen Kotori's death and if he knew of how he choose his own group. Hinoto apologizes for lying, and reveals that if Kamui had chosen the Dragons of Earth, he would be one the who had personality change and kill Kotori while Fūma would have been the chosen one from the Dragons of Heaven. Despite being angered, Kamui thanks Hinoto for telling him the truth. Meanwhile, Seishirō and Kusanagi follow Nataku to Kanoe's hideout, reuniting all the Dragons of Earth.
15	"Guardian"; Transliteration: "Shugo" (Japanese: 守護)	Shigetaka Ikeda	Yoshiaki Kawajiri	January 23, 2002
Saiki remembers his training with Aoki, telling to Hinoto that despite not being a Dragon of Heaven, he is happy that he was destined to protect her. Meanwhile, Nataku states he wants to stay with Fūma as he resembles his father, and Fūma decides to grant his wish. Kamui then visits Hinoto, requesting her to teach him create a barrier to fight without wounding others. As Hinoto is also unable to do that, Saiki tells him Aoki once said that he created barriers when wishing to protect others. As Kamui thanks Saiki, Fūma and Nataku attack the Tōjō Pharmaceuticals's building. As Nataku hesitates when being about to kill his creator, Kamui confronts Fūma. Unable to create a barrier, Kamui is easily defeated, and Saiki goes to his aid. Fūma tells Saiki he will grant his wish of dying while defending Hinoto, and kills him much to Hinoto's shock. An angered Kamui attacks Fūma, who teases him for not trying to kill him. As Fūma is about finish Kamui, Subaru's barrier appears. Later, Subaru is wounded while Aoki sadly holds Saiki's corpse.
16	"Slaughter"; Transliteration: "Kyomu" (Japanese: 虚無)	Masahiko Ohta	Kazuyuki Fudeyasu	January 30, 2002
It is revealed that when Subaru went to save Kamui, he was overpowered by Fūma. Fūma left after granting Subaru's wish of losing his right eye as Seishirō once lost it. After Kamui and Subaru recover, the Dragons of Heaven search for the Dragons of Earth. Hinoto informs Subaru that Seishirō will attack Tokyo's Rainbow Bridge and Subaru goes to face him alone. Both onmyōji battle within Subaru's barrier, as Seishirō asks him what is his wish. As Seishirō tries to kill Subaru, the attack is reversed due to Hokuto's dying spell which ends in Subaru impaling Seishirō. Shocked, Subaru confesses that his real wish was to be killed by Seishirō. Seishirō dies before telling Subaru something unknown, and Subaru ends catatonic again. Fūma and Kakyō reflect that now Hinoto is on their side, and thanks to losing Seishirō, Subaru is unable to create barriers.
17	"Wish"; Transliteration: "Kumon" (Japanese: 苦悶)	Toshiyuki Sakai	Kazuyuki Fudeyasu	February 6, 2002
Kakyō talks with Hinoto about how both cannot change the future they have seen, but Kakyō wishes that Kotori's last words that the destiny was decided will be right. Kakyō reveals that he wants Fūma kill him, remembering how he met Hokuto through a dream and wished to go to the sea with her. Later, Kakyō enters into Kamui's dream questioning his wish while the series' events regarding Kamui are recapped. As Kamui states he still wishes to bring back Fūma and will defeat him, Kakyō makes Kotori appear in the dream. Kotori embraces Kamui, telling him her death was not his fault and convinces him he can change destiny.
18	"Newborn"; Transliteration: "Shinsei" (Japanese: 新生)	Haruo Sotozaki	Kazuyuki Fudeyasu	February 13, 2002
Yuzuriha goes on a date with Kusanagi, but former senses a Dragon of Earth attacking the city and leaves the latter. Yuzuriha is faced by Satsuki who questions why she states humans should not die. Unable to bring an answer, Satsuki uses Beast to kill Yuzuriha, but Inuki dies at her place. Kusanagi later rescues an unconscious Yuzuriha, being now aware of her role. After recovering at the hospital, Yuzuriha tells Kusanagi she likes him, but although he does not correspond her, both decide to stay in touch. Fūma starts following Yuzuriha who creates a barrier around the city. As Fūma tests Yuzuriha to know if her wish is dying, Yuzuriha decides she wants to live for Inuki's sacrifice and another inugami is embodied from her power. Fūma decides to leave her as Kusanagi was hidden preparing to ambush him if he attacked Yuzuriha.
19	"Inferno"; Transliteration: "Rengoku" (Japanese: 煉獄)	Yukio Okazaki	Kazuyuki Fudeyasu	February 20, 2002
Aoki divorces from his wife so that she will not get involved with the upcoming battles. As Yūto arranges Aoki's papers, both arrange for a fight. Karen hears their conversation and invites Aoki to her house. Meanwhile, Nataku learns from Satsuki that he was cloned after his creator's granddaughter, and Kanoe makes him a request. Karen drugs Aoki to make him sleep and go in his place, stating that if she dies nobody will cry. At the area, Karen meets Nataku who replaced Yūto and both battle. When Karen overpowers him, she identifies herself with Nataku as he is not afraid of dying. Karen remembers her mother considered her a demon for manipulating fire, and after her dead, a priest encouraged her not to think that. Yūto then attacks Karen, trying drown her with his water. A tired Aoki comes to her aid, and Yūto decides to postpone their battle. Before falling unconscious again, Aoki tells Karen he will cry if she dies.
20	"Ripple"; Transliteration: "Koiuta" (Japanese: 恋歌)	Masahiro Hosoda	Hiroko Tokita	February 27, 2002
Sorata convinces Kamui to stop regretting things about the past, and think about the present. Kamui then goes to have dinner with him, Yuzuriha and Arashi, much to Arashi's surprise. Hinoto later calls the four of them, as she found two places where the Dragons of Earth are about to attack. As Kamui and Sorata go to one area, Arashi and Yuzuriha go to the other where Yuzuriha starts wondering if Arashi is in love with Sorata. Fūma ambushes Arashi and Yuzuriha, but Hinoto tells the other pair they have to stay in their area for another attack. Sorata summons a shikigami-like being to protect Arashi when she is about to die in the confrontation. As the Sorata's summon is damaged in the outcome, so is Sorata, and Fūma leaves. The next day, Sorata is hospitalized and Arashi feels guilty for his sacrifice. Sorata states it should not matter to her as she does not love him, but she negates that, and both kiss. After both sleep together, Arashi goes to Fūma's hideout alone.
21	"Current"; Transliteration: "Rurō" (Japanese: 流浪)	Shinya Hanai; Shigetaka Ikeda	Yuki Enatsu	March 6, 2002
Satsuki goes on a date with Yūto which makes Beast grow jealous. Aoki and Karen talk about the following battles, with the former reminding the latter not to fight alone again. During the night, Karen follows Yūto as they promised a rematch, but Yūto escapes from her and ends encountering Aoki. As Aoki and Yūto are battling, Satsuki makes Beast attack Aoki, leaving him inmovilized in a building. Yūto tries to kill Aoki, but he is opposed by an angered Karen. The two of them fight again with Yūto manipulating water and Karen fire. As Yūto gets his chance to kill her, Karen incinerates herself with him. Satsuki tries to help Yūto, but she is instead killed by Beast's wires. Aoki finds a dying Karen who is happy she could save him. Meanwhile, Yūto has escaped from the area and dies, remembering that he once told Satsuki that humans' death always make sadder others.
22	"Betrayal"; Transliteration: "Haishin" (Japanese: 背信)	Masahiko Watanabe	Kazuyuki Fudeyasu	March 13, 2002
It is revealed that Hinoto has an alternate personality that has been possessing her body to kill the Dragons of Heaven. Kamui tells Sorata he has been suspecting her as he realized she created the shikigami to attack him and Tokiko. Meanwhile, Yuzuriha is attacked by Nataku, and when Aoki who goes to her support, he is opposed by Kusanagi. While the two Dragons of Earth get the upper hand, Kamui and Sorata are petrified by Hinoto's spell. As Yuzuriha is about to be killed, she sees Kusanagi and confesses she always knew of his identity, but still trusted him. In order to stop her other self, Hinoto commits suicide and Kamui and Sorata are freed. Sorata goes to Yuzuriha who is saved by Kusanagi from Nataku. Arashi appears and cuts Kusanagi's shoulder much to Sorata's and Yuzuriha's shock. Kamui finds the dying Hinoto, who apologizes for what happened as she was afraid of the future she saw. She then requests Kamui to change destiny, and that his sacred sword will be unsealed with her death.
23	"Earth"; Transliteration: "Daichi" (Japanese: 天地)	Masahiko Ohta	Hiroko Tokita	March 20, 2002
Arashi states she is a Dragon of Earth now and leaves with Nataku. As Kusanagi and the Dragons of Heaven are being treated, Sorata wonders why Arashi betrayed them. Kamui takes the sacred sword from the academy, says goodbye to the catatonic Subaru, and leaves to fight Fūma. Sorata realizes that Arashi plans to kill Kamui so that he will not have sacrifice himself, and runs to their pursue. Kamui confronts Fūma and Arashi, but the latter is stopped by Sorata. Sorata decides he will kill Arashi if she attacks Kamui, but both are ultimately unable hurt each other. Fūma then tries kill Arashi for betrayal, but Sorata intervenes and is impaled. Before falling, Sorata electrifies Fūma's body, forcing him to escape to Nataku's side. After telling Arashi he last will is that she continues living, Sorata dies with his prophecy being fulfilled.
24	"Legend"; Transliteration: "Densetsu" (Japanese: 伝説)	Hiroshi Hamasaki	Hiroko Tokita	March 27, 2002
Fūma kills Nataku to make his flesh regenerate his own. Kakyō reveals that the future always showed the Dragon of Earth as the winner no matter which side Kamui would have chosen. As Kamui goes to the Tokyo Tower for the last battle, Kakyō sends Hokuto's soul to Subaru. Hokuto states that while she and Seishirō will live inside him, he still has something to protect. Kamui starts battling Fūma, now willing to kill him. In the fight, Kamui's sacred sword is broken by Fūma's which impales his chest. Fūma then tries to finish him, but Subaru receives the attack and escapes with Kamui. A dying Subaru urges Kamui to accomplish his wish, and Kamui returns to Fūma. He is once again impaled by the sacred sword, and states that while he sacrificed his life, Fūma will inherit his will. Kamui's body turns into a barrier that reverses the damage by the Dragons of Earth, while Fūma returns to his original self and Subaru appears safe. Later, Kakyō states that Earth's destiny changed, and accomplishes his wish of joining the late Hokuto.

== Home media release ==
=== Japanese ===
Name	Date	Discs	Episodes
An Omen	February 25, 2002	1	OVA
Volume 1	February 25, 2002	1	1–2
Volume 2	March 25, 2002	1	3–4
Volume 3	April 25, 2002	1	5–6
Volume 4	May 25, 2002	1	7–8
Volume 5	June 22, 2002	1	9–11
Volume 6	July 25, 2002	1	12–13
Volume 7	August 25, 2002	1	12–13
Volume 8	September 25, 2002	1	14–15
Volume 9	October 25, 2002	1	16–17
Volume 10	November 25, 2002	1	19–20
Volume 11	December 21, 2002	1	21–22
Volume 12	January 25, 2003	1	23–24

=== English ===
North America

Name	Date	Discs	Episodes
Volume 1	September 24, 2002	1	1–3, OVA
Volume 2	November 19, 2002	1	4–6
Volume 3	January 28, 2003	1	7-9
Volume 4	March 25, 2003	1	10–12
Volume 5	May 27, 2003	1	13-15
Volume 6	July 22, 2003	1	16-18
Volume 7	September 23, 2003	1	19-21
Volume 8	November 25, 2003	1	22-24

Remix

Name	Date	Discs	Episodes
Volume 1	July 11, 2007	1	
Volume 2	July 11, 2007	1	
Volume 3	August 15, 2007	1	
Volume 4	August 15, 2007	1	
Volume 5	September 12, 2006	1	
X - 3-Pack (DVD 1–3)	July 6, 2004	1	
X - Remix DVD Set (DVD 1–5)	July 6, 2004	1	

Boxsets

Name	Date	Discs	Episodes
X - TV Series DVD Box Set 1 (DVD/R1 1-4 of 8)	January 11, 2005	1	
X (Part 2)	January 11, 2005	1	
Funimation's compilation	August 25, 2015	1	

Region 2

Name	Date	Discs	Episodes
X - TV Series DVD Box Set 1 (DVD/R1 1-4 of 8)	October 4, 2010	1	
