= List of X characters =

The Dragons of Heaven. Clockwise from the top left: Sorata, Arashi, Aoki, Subaru, Yuzuriha, Kamui and Karen.

The Dragons of Earth. Clockwise from the top left: Seishiro, Yuto, Satsuki, Fuma, Nataku, Kusanagi and Shogo.

The fictional characters of the Japanese manga series X were created by Clamp, a manga artist group composed of Satsuki Igarashi, Nanase Ohkawa, Mick Nekoi, and Mokona Apapa. X takes place in the year 1999 when the end of the world is fast approaching as superhuman individuals gather and take sides in the city of Tokyo, site for the battle of Armageddon. Most of the series' characters with Kamui Shiro's exception originated from Clamp's doujinshi they created before creating X while characters like Subaru Sumeragi appear as returning characters from the manga Tokyo Babylon meant to support the lead due to his parallel and tragic past. Ohkawa wrote the script while the other three members made the art.

The series follows Kamui, a young esper who goes back to Tokyo to fulfill his role in the Armageddon. He can join two groups for different objectives: either Dragons of Heaven and protect mankind from being extinguished, or the Dragons of Earth to protect the planet at the cost of ending the society. Kamui joins the former due to his only wish being protecting his childhood friends Fūma Monou and Kotori Monou. However, this causes Fūma to develop an alternate personality as Kamui's rival, filling his empty role in the Dragons of Earth and becoming his nemesis. The war between the two factions who involve seven members who each side begins. Due to the manga not being finished by Clamp, a film and an anime television series have provided the manga an alternate ending where the outcome and fate of the cast is created.

Critical reception to the series' cast has been positive due to their role in the armageddon, Kamui's early characterization also earned positive responses for his brooding nature until he becomes a more heroic warrior and his past is explained. As the film provided little focus on the entire cast with the main ones' exception, the television series was praised more for giving each member from the two Dragons their own screentime to explore their personalities like the manga did. The Japanese voice actors for the cast has been met with positive response though the English dub received mixed reactions for not fitting their roles.

== Creation and development ==
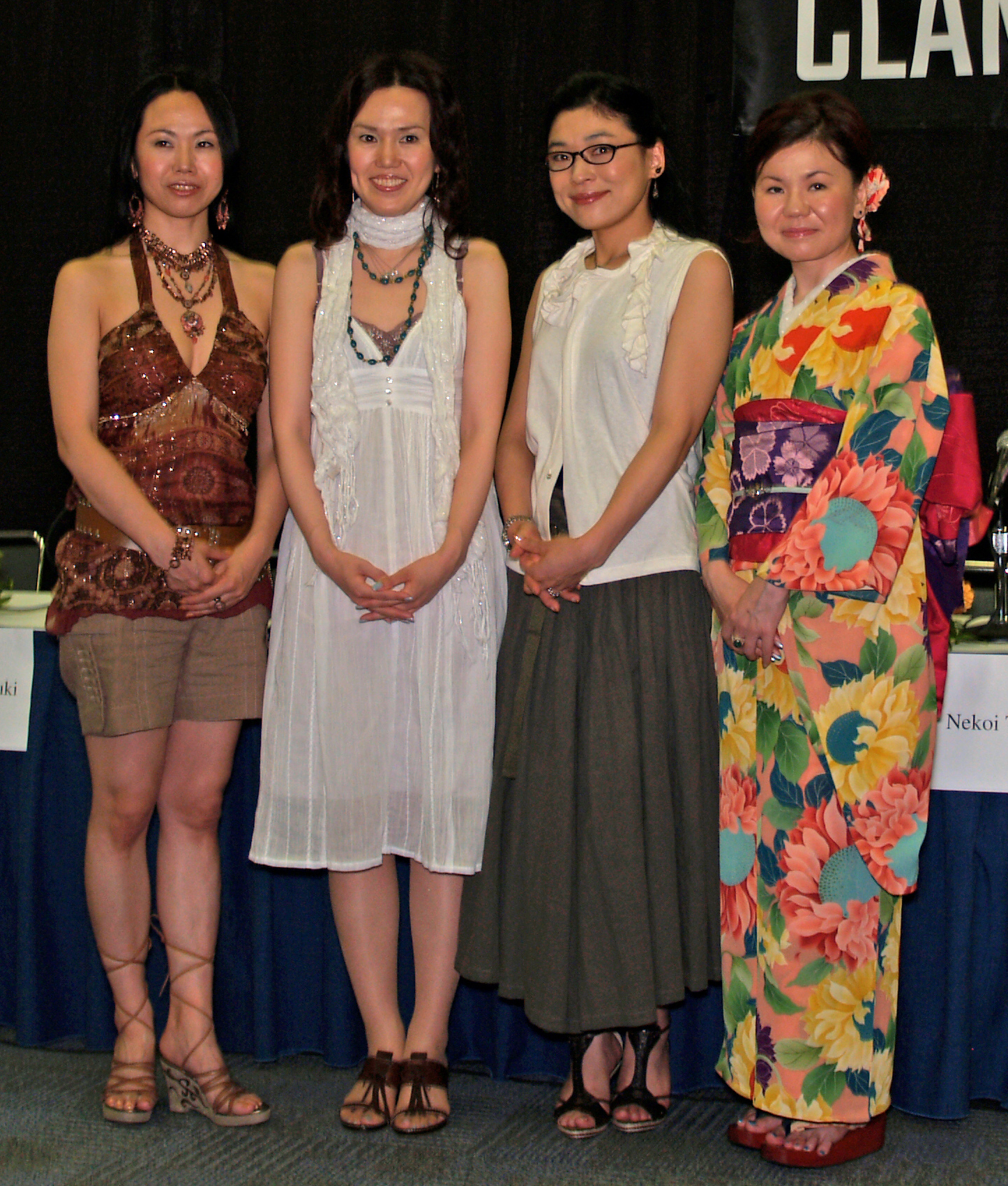
The members from the manga group Clamp. From left to right: Satsuki Igarashi, Nanase Ohkawa, Mick Nekoi, and Mokona Apapa.

After finishing Clamp School Detectives, the manga artists group Clamp decided to write a story in which readers see the development of two groups, the Dragons of Heaven and the Dragons of Earth led by Kamui Shiro and Fūma Monou, respectively. Ohkawa specifically chose the idea of seven characters from two groups because she was influenced by religious groups but wanted to avoid Christian references. Instead, she created the concept of the Dragons of Heaven and Earth and avoided less characters due to similarities with the tokusatsu genre. However, rather than starting the manga with the war between the Dragons, she instead envisioned the "high school manga" to introduce the cast in a more fashion mode. Kamui was originally written as a high-school student from Kotori Monou's point of view to appeal to the audience of females. However, controversial response from readers led to Clamp changing their characterizations. Ohkawa also aimed to show characters from their previous works in the X resulting in multiple crossovers. As Kamui and Kotori's characterization were changed due the negative response, Clamp wrote the idea of Kotori's post traumatic disorder and her eventual death which resulted in sad responses from readers. Though he had few appearances in the beginning, Ohkawa envisioned Fuma's transformation into the series' villain which the other artists from the group enjoyed and thus looked forward to draw.

Several of the series' characters were created using the Osamu Tezuka's Star System technique were old designs incorporated in new characters with Kamui's exception which proved challenging due to his role. He was made to stand apart from other characters, and Ohkawa called his hairstyle and school uniform average. Clamp's lead artist Mokona believes this was influenced by the heroic character-type upon which he was based. During serialization of the series, Clamp found issues with the amount of gore they aimed to portray especially Kotori's death which is foreshadowed in dream scenes. This was mostly affected by the themes of violence and video games present in the 1990s but the writers feared that toning down the violence would negatively affect the manga. Another death scene that left Clamp facing issues was when Fuma decapitates Saiki which resulted in more negative response from the readers. Ohkawa claimed that they were meant to be cruel with the narrative which did not fit in the magazine's demography. The fight sequences were inspired by the manga Dragon Ball most specifically by how the author Akira Toriyama used white backgrounds.

Kamui is prophesied to return to Tokyo as one who will determine humanity's fate. The construction of Kamui as a messiah is reinforced by his miraculous birth and given name; "Kamui", like "Christ", alludes to the character's nature. A common theme involves the series' fate, Subaru Sumeragi expresses no interest in the future of the Earth, but still he and his counterpart are drawn to Tokyo on the Promised Day. As a result, even with the fatalist atmosphere that persists in the series. His rivalry with Seishirō Sakurazuka parallels Kamui's rivalry with Fūma Monou. Clamp referred to Kamui and Subaru as siblings; Kamui is supposed to learn from Subaru's final fight with Seishirō and avoid his final fight against Fuma having the same tragic conclusion. Ohkawa also applied to Kamui and Fuma ideas she had during middle school such as the fact that both possess a dual nature as she states people can be considered good or evil.

When drawing characters, Mokona felt Fuma was the hardest one to draw as they often had to make him look like other characters like Kusanagi due to members from the cast seeing similarities between the others who they cherished. As a result, they avoided the idea of Aoki meeting Fuma since they would be forced to make Fuma androgynous due to the potential need of drawing Aoki's wife. Igarashi found drawing the Dragons of Heaven and Earth at the same time proved difficult because of their multiple unique clothes which left her wishing they instead wore the same outfits.

For X animated adaptations, the characters experienced changes from their original versions. For the 1996 film, Ohkawa helped director Rintaro in writing the script. The character Shogo Asagi was created exclusively to the movie. The characters were designed by Nobuteri Yuki. Director Yoshiaki Kawajiri aimed to portray Kamui and Kotori as stronger than their manga counterparts. However, he still wanted to highlight their psychological weaknesses across later episodes. Kenichi Suzumura had a poor understanding of Kamui during early recording of the television series as the pilot original video animation gave Kamui small screentime and dialogue. Fuma's actor, Junichi Suwabe, faced difficulties in voicing him due to his different alterego that makes him look like two characters. Koshinori Kanemori adapted Clamp's character designs and served as art director along with Yuji Ikeda.

== Main characters ==
=== Kamui Shiro ===
Voiced by: Kenichi Suzumura (Japanese); Steve Cannon (as a teenager) and Brianne Siddall (credited as Ian Hawk) (as a child) (English) in the TV series
Voiced by: Tomokazu Seki (Japanese); Alan D. Marriott (English) in the feature film

The protagonist of X, Kamui Shirō (司狼 神威, Shirō Kamui) is a powerful esper whose destiny is to decide whether the world should be destroyed so it may be reborn without humanity or save the world so humanity can continue to live in its current state.

=== Fūma Monou ===
Voiced by: Junichi Suwabe (Japanese); Crispin Freeman (English) in the TV series
Voiced by: Ken Narita (Japanese); Adam Henderson (English) in the feature film

Kamui's best friend, Fūma Monou (桃生 封真, Monou Fūma) is initially kind and gentle. He helps his father dutifully, dotes upon his younger sister Kotori, and excels at high-school sports. After Nataku attacks Kyōgo and steals the first Sacred Sword, Fūma's dying father tells him that he is Kamui's twin star. Accordingly, when Kamui chooses the Dragons of Heaven, Fūma is forced to become a Dragon of Earth, immediately attacking Kamui and killing Kotori. He proceeds to grant wishes to the characters with whom he interacts, in ways that often lead to their death or that of a loved one. Though he is portrayed as sadistic in the TV series and in the case of the movie a psychotic murderer, the manga portrays Fūma in a less fiendish light.

=== Kotori Monou ===
Voiced by: Mamiko Noto (Japanese); Michelle Ruff (English) in the TV series
Voiced by: Junko Iwao (Japanese); Larissa Murray (English) in the feature film

Kotori Monou (桃生 小鳥, Monou Kotori) is Fūma's younger sister, a delicate child with a congenital heart condition, and a developing dreamseer. She is also able to communicate with plants and animals. Like her brother, she was Kamui's very close childhood friend, and despite his initial coldness when he returns to her life, remains steadfastly kind to him. Kotori remembers with horror the day her mother died as she gave birth to the first sacred sword; when she sees the same thing happen to Tokiko Magami, she loses her mind, able to communicate rationally only in the dreamscape. Before she reawakens, she is crucified and killed by Fūma as he becomes the Kamui of the Dragons of Earth. In spirit form she stays with the Dragon of Earth dreamseer Kakyō Kuzuki for a time, encouraging and thanking him, and telling him that the future has not been determined yet. Initially, Kotori was disliked by the manga readers as Clamp pointed out she did not any major appeal other that being cute. However, the constant foreshadowings of her death displeased the readers for giving her such a gory death.

In the TV series, her dream is to become an indigo dyesmith (in the style of Japan's Edo period), well aware of the commitment necessary, and she spends time in her school's library reading up on the subject. Her character was modified for the TV series as director Yoshiaki Kawajiri wanted to portray her as a more regular teenager. In the movie, Kotori dies when the second Sacred Sword is removed from her body. When Fūma first attempts to do it, entering the dreamscape with such a purpose, Kotori actually escapes with Kamui's help and reaches Hinoto's room where he is waiting, but ultimately Fūma catches her and pulls the Sacred Sword out of his sister's belly with his bare hands, killing her much to Kamui and everyone else's horror. Kamui takes her body to the Tokyo Tower just before the final fight.

== Dragons of Heaven ==
The Dragons of Heaven (天の龍, Ten no Ryū), or The Seven Seals (七つの封印, Nanatsu no Fūin), are a group of seven individuals who are fated to stand against the Dragons of Earth in the apocalyptic battle on the Promised Day to determine the fate of the Earth and humanity. The Dragons of Heaven ideologically represent the belief that conflicts between man and nature can and must be resolved peaceably, and that humanity is no less precious than the Earth itself. Each of the Dragons of Heaven has a unique background (usually involving Japanese occult sects), but all of the Dragons of Heaven are united in their desire to protect others. The Dragons of Heaven each exhibit the ability to create Spirit Shields in order to prevent innocent people from being harmed when battle with the Dragons of Earth erupts. It is heavily suggested that when a Dragon of Heaven loses the person or people that they wish to protect, or loses the will to protect others, the Dragon of Heaven concurrently loses their ability to create a Spirit Shield and is no longer considered a Dragon of Heaven. The term "seal" is an allusion to the Book of Revelation, but with a twist instead of seals on a scroll to be broken by the lamb of God, the Seven Seals are to be broken by the Seven Angels.

In Tsubasa, their alternate versions exist in Tokyo, an apocalyptic world continually corroded by acidic rain as fighters of the Tower faction, who spar with people of the City Hall faction (alternate versions of the Dragon of Earth) for the scarce pure water left. They are led by the alternate version of Fūma, who is secretly a treasure hunter across dimensions, and Daisuke Saiki replaces Subaru as one of the seven.

=== Sorata Arisugawa ===
Voiced by: Mitsuaki Madono (Japanese); Tony Oliver (English) in the TV series
Voiced by: Kōichi Yamadera (Japanese); Mike Fitzpatrick (English) in the feature film

Sorata Arisugawa (有洙川 空汰, Arisugawa Sorata) is an upbeat teenager possessing considerable occult abilities, raised by the Shingon Buddhist monks of Mount Kōya after being taken away from his mother at a young age. A gourmand, he was frequently in trouble at the shrine for stealing food between meals (insisting that he could not wait until dinner), and is also a competent cook. It was prophesied that he would protect Kamui with his life, but that he would die for a woman; the first time he meets Arashi, he decides she will be the one. In addition to generating powerful electrical discharges, he is also capable of calling upon a gohōdōji, a magical being similar to a shikigami (or familiar spirit), manifesting as a massive, hideous ghostly creature. It is psychically linked to Sorata, allowing him to spy on others and act at a distance from himself, but he suffers any damage inflicted upon it. In the manga his gohōdōji follows Arashi until it is needed, functioning much like a guardian angel, while in the anime he dispatches it once, to protect Arashi when he cannot intervene himself. Sorata is based on the policeman from a Romeo and Juliet-like dojinshi Clamp wrote where he had a romance with Arashi.

In the anime, the prophecy is realized as he dies defending Arashi from Fūma's Sacred Sword, despite her earlier attempts to kill Kamui. He similarly dies in the movie version battling Fūma, again giving his life to protect Arashi.

Sorata also appears several times in Tsubasa as a relatively prominent crossover character: in the Republic of Hanshin, he's a history teacher married to Arashi and acts as host to Syaoran's group, briefly appears as a Dragonfly Racer in Piffle World, and in Tokyo, as one of the seven fighters of the Tower faction.

=== Arashi Kishū ===
Voiced by: Ryoka Yuzuki (Japanese); Lia Sargent (English) in the TV series
Voiced by: Emi Shinohara (Japanese); Teresa Gallagher (English) in the feature film

Arashi Kishū (鬼咒 嵐, Kishū Arashi) is a foundling girl raised by Shinto priests at Ise Shrine (her mother was a priestess there until she left the shrine after learning of Arashi's destiny; her father apparently never knew of the pregnancy), and she is the Dragon of Heaven most immediately in touch with Princess Hinoto. Called the "Hidden Priestess of Ise", her specialty is sword fighting, and she can summon a massive sword emerging from her left hand. Despite her cold, stoic front, Sorata falls in love with her, and ultimately she comes to reciprocate. In the manga, Sorata and Arashi consummate their feelings for each other after Sorata injures himself while saving Arashi's life. As a result of losing her virginity, Arashi loses the power to summon her sword, just as her mother did before her. Upset, Arashi is placed under a spell by Hinoto's dark half such that when she reawakens, she will fight as a Dragon of Earth. Arashi is based on a yakuza heroine from Romeo and Juliet-like dojinshi Clamp wrote where she had a romance with Sorata. Multiple changes were made to her design.

In the anime series, she is convinced by Fūma that she must join the Dragons of Earth and kill Kamui, in order to release Sorata from his obligation to defend her. In so doing, she ends up causing the death of her lover, and loses her abilities as a Dragon of Heaven. She is last seen at the Mount Kōya shrine reminiscing about Sorata. In the movie, she is stabbed and killed by Fūma, after witnessing Sorata's last moments.

Arashi also appears twice in Tsubasa as a relatively prominent crossover character: a retired miko married to Sorata in the Republic of Hanshin and a miko siding with the Tower faction who can foresee disaster in the world of Tokyo.

=== Subaru Sumeragi ===
Voiced by: Tomokazu Sugita (Japanese); Dave Wittenberg (English) in the TV series
Voiced by: Issei Miyazaki (Japanese); William Dufris (English) in the feature film

Originally from Tokyo Babylon, Subaru Sumeragi (皇 昴流, Sumeragi Subaru) is an onmyōji and the 13th Head of the Sumeragi clan. His barrier field is shaped like a pentagram. Once a cheerful teenager, he has grown into a sad, reticent young man, obsessed with settling the score with Seishirō Sakurazuka. Subaru is initially uninterested in the battle for the end of the world, but is convinced to join the Dragons of Heaven. He shares a close friendship with Kamui, based on the similar hardships they have faced.

=== Seiichirō Aoki ===
Voiced by: Toshiyuki Morikawa (Japanese); Steven Blum (English) in the TV series
Voiced by: Hideyuki Tanaka (Japanese); David Harris (English) in the feature film

The wind magician Seiichirō Aoki (蒼軌 征一狼, Aoki Seiichirō) is a mild-mannered copy editor with a wife and child. In the TV series, upon discovering that the battle between the Seals and Angels is at hand, Aoki secretly divorces his wife Shimako in order to spare her grief should he be killed. He impresses Karen, who eventually dies saving him in the anime. He is last seen visiting Karen's grave with his family. Aoki is a very gentle and even-tempered man and is only seen to become angry once in X, when Karen attempts to sacrifice herself for his sake. He is a wind master, with the ability to conjure and control wind currents. This is his family's gift; his nephew Daisuke Saiki has the same ability, though he is not as strong. In the movie, Aoki is badly wounded by Nataku, but during their fight, Aoki grabs his opponent and leaps off the top of the Sunshine 60 building, killing them both.

Aoki appears as a crossover character in Tsubasa. He lives in the world of Tokyo as one of the seven fighters of the Tower faction. In the X Tarot set, he represents The Hierophant.

=== Karen Kasumi ===
Voiced by: Yōko Sōmi (Japanese); Wendee Lee (English) in the TV series.
Voiced by: Mami Koyama (Japanese); Toni Barry (English) in the feature film.

A devout Catholic, Karen Kasumi (夏澄 火煉, Kasumi Karen) was abused by her fundamentalist mother when her power to manipulate fire manifested in her childhood. After her mother died, she was, according to the anime television series, raised by a kindly priest, but she continued to remember her mother's last words: "No one would be sad if you died!" In the CD dramas it is shown that Karen was scouted by several religious sects in her childhood, but her mother would always shoo them away, saying her daughter was a demon and not a messiah. As an adult, Karen works as a call girl for the soapland brothel "Flower", and often enters battle wearing her "work clothes", though she retains some of her childhood innocence in her beloved teddy bear. The relationship between Karen and Aoki is often mistaken as her feeling affection-in a romantic sense-for him.

In the anime series, Karen sacrifices her life to kill Yūto in order to protect Aoki. In the movie, Karen and Shōgo battle in the subway. Karen causes a massive explosion, causing them both to be crushed by debris.

Karen appears twice in Tsubasa as a crossover character: in the world of Shara-no, she's the leading woman in an entertainment troupe and in the world of Tokyo, one of the seven fighters of the Tower faction.

=== Yuzuriha Nekoi ===
Voiced by: Kumi Sakuma (Japanese); Philece Sampler (English) in the TV series
Voiced by: Yukana Nogami (Japanese); Anne-Marie Lawless (English) in the feature film

Yuzuriha Nekoi (猫依 護刃, Nekoi Yuzuriha) is a fourteen-year-old schoolgirl descended from the keepers of Mitsumine Shrine, masters of inugami (dog-spirits); their family name, which literally means "reliant on the cat", was deliberately chosen to conceal this. A fan of sweets such as ice cream and Pocky (fictionalized as "Pooky" in the manga and "Rocky" in the anime), Yuzuriha is exceedingly energetic, often defusing latent tension between Kamui and the rest of the Dragons of Heaven. Yuzuriha's uncanny ability to allay Kamui's suspicions and earn his trust seems slightly tongue-in-cheek in that Yuzuriha essentially has dealt with wolf-like inugami her entire life, and Kamui's demeanor towards the rest of the Dragons of Heaven prior to Yuzuriha's appearance was rather wolfish—a play on Kamui's familial name.

Yuzuriha is attended by her own personal inugami, Inuki (犬鬼), who can shapeshift into anything she desires and who can only be seen by others with occult powers. She was teased throughout much of her childhood as some of her classmates believed Inuki was her imaginary friend. Because of this, Yuzuriha made a vow that she would never fall in love with (or even date) a man who could not see Inuki. However, the first person outside of her family that she meets who can see Inuki is Kusanagi Shiyū—a Dragon of Earth. Yuzuriha falls in love with Kusanagi, regardless of their conflicting fates. When Inuki is killed by Satsuki, one of the Dragons of Earth, she becomes greatly depressed, and Fūma confronts her, prepared to grant her apparent wish to die; however, as he is forced to admit, her true wish is to live, and a new inugami (which she also names Inuki) is born from her heart.

At the end of the TV series, Yuzuriha is seen sitting by a waterfall with Inuki and Kusanagi (the same waterfall that the original Inuki led her to earlier in the series). In the movie, however, Yuzuriha's relationship with Kusanagi is not acknowledged, and she is killed in a battle with Yūto and Kusanagi while protecting Kamui.

Yuzuriha appears in Tsubasa as a relatively prominent crossover character: she's paired up with Kusanagi Shiyū as a player in Edonis Country and is one of the seven fighters of the Tower faction in Tokyo.

== Dragons of Earth ==
The Dragons of Earth (地の龍, Chi no Ryū), also known as the Seven Angels (七人の御使, Shichinin no Mitsukai), are a group of seven individuals who are fated to stand against the Dragons of Heaven in the apocalyptic battle on the Promised Day to determine the fate of the Earth and humanity. The Dragons of Earth ideologically represent the belief that conflicts between man and nature cannot be resolved peaceably, and that humans are on an irreversible path that will ultimately lead to the murder of the planet itself unless they are stopped. Unlike the Dragons of Heaven, the Dragons of Earth seem to have no common rationality for their acceptance of their roles as the destroyers of humanity.

The Dragons of Earth are also known as the Seven Angels (translated also as the Seven Harbingers and the Seven Minions). Regarding the multiple translations for the title of the Seven Angels, the kanji 御使 is often translated into English as "angel"; however, its literal meaning is closer to a "messenger of authority" or a "servant of authority". While this ties in rather well with the etymological origins of the world angel (Ancient Greek, αγγελος, meaning "messenger"), the literal meaning of the kanji made for an awkward translation in the Viz manga, resulting in the Angels being called "Harbingers". The official merchandising of the X movie in Japanese translated 御使 into "Minions" in English. The official translation, as per Clamp's final word, stands as "the Seven Angels".

In Tsubasa, their alternate versions exist in Tokyo, an apocalyptic world continually corroded by acidic rain as fighters of the City Hall faction, who spar with people of the Tower faction (alternate versions of the Dragon of Heaven) for the scarce pure water left. They are led by the alternate version of Kamui, who is a vampire, and Nataku's original, Kazuki, replaces Seishirō as one of the seven.

=== Yūto Kigai ===
Voiced by: Michiaki Furuya (Japanese); Ezra Weisz (English) in the TV series.
Voiced by: Kazuhiko Inoue (Japanese); Nigel Whitney (English) in the feature film.

Yūto Kigai (麒飼 遊人, Kigai Yūto) is a polite but largely amoral young man who originally appeared in the Clamp dōjinshi work Hagun Seisenki, as a college student at Clamp Academy and a comrade of Takamura Suō. A bureaucrat working at the Ward Office, he never lets on to any of the happy couples turning in their marriage licenses that he is seeking to destroy humanity, assuming an air of bland cheerfulness which he maintains even in combat. Usually sporting a pink shirt and white overcoat, people have been known to remark that he looks like a pimp (except in the American translation of the manga, where this is softened to "someone in showbiz"). He is in a sexual relationship with Kanoe, but is amused by the knowledge that Satsuki has a crush on him; he sees the latter as a sort of younger sister and protégée, and attempts to educate her about emotions. He is based on a dojinshi story known as Hagunsei Seki.

In combat Yūto wields a sai dagger capable of severing human hands with one swipe, and which bears a powerful whiplash attachment that can smash through concrete. He is also a water master (an ability that in X he had not used for some time), capable of summoning floods and hurling water bolts, as well as arranging more benign fountain displays for the amusement of others. In the anime, he can even transform himself into water and travel in this form (on one occasion entering a room through fire sprinklers).

In the TV series, he dies from wounds sustained after a mortally-wounded Karen incinerates him, while in the movie he is brutally killed by Fūma who practically dismembers him before impaling him with his Sacred Sword. In the movie, he does not display water-based powers, these being given to Shōgo Asagi instead.

Yuuto appears in Tsubasa as a crossover character: he lives in Tokyo as a fighter of the City Hall faction and receives Syaoran's group more amiably than the rest of the group.

=== Satsuki Yatōji ===
Voiced by: Houko Kuwashima (Japanese); Karen Strassman (English) in the TV series
Voiced by: Kotono Mitsuishi (Japanese); Anne Marie Zola (English) in the feature film

A complex and ingenious young woman with utter contempt for humans, Satsuki Yatōji (八頭司 颯姫, Yatōji Satsuki) has a love for the digital world instead. At a young age she developed the uncanny ability to interact with computers through cables inserted into her skin, and to hack into any technological system. This led to her father sending her to a lab for further study; she amazed the scientists by mastering the Sephirot at the age of 14. However, she rebelled against the boredom she felt and in the anime television series, through her "friends" in the computer world, arranged for the death of her father (in a road traffic accident), along with anyone else who stood in her way. While escaping from the lab she encountered Kanoe and joined her cause, having learned from the digital world that she was one of the Dragons of Earth; later Yūto forcibly convinced the scientists to never bother her again. In the manga, she kills the people in the lab (who are implied to be Freemasons), but it is unknown if complications arose from this or when and where she met Kanoe.

Satsuki is an extreme rationalist, and attacks Yuzuriha when the latter cannot explain why killing humans is more wrong than the killing of the natural world. She spends much of her time wired into a massive supercomputer named the Beast (provided for her by Kanoe), through which she can physically control cables across Tokyo, using them for reconnaissance and offensive purposes. She develops feelings for Yūto, one of the few people who managed to befriend her, and who in fact gave her the answer that Yuzuriha couldn't; in the TV anime and movie versions, this causes the Beast to become jealous and kill her by invading and impaling her entire body with its cables.

In Tsubasa, Satsuki is one of the fighters of the City Hall faction. She studies medicine and initially receives Syaoran's group with suspicion; however she's notably less apathetic than her X version, her personality more bordering on seriousness.

=== Seishirō Sakurazuka ===
Voiced by: Otoya Kawano (Japanese); Dave Mallow (English) in the TV series
Voiced by: Tōru Furusawa (Japanese); Garrick Hagon (English) in the feature film

Originally from Tokyo Babylon, in which he appeared to be a kindly, magically aware veterinarian, Seishirō Sakurazuka (桜塚 星史郎, Sakurazuka Seishirō) is in fact the Sakurazukamori, the Guardian of the Cherry Blossom Burial Mound, a lone assassin whose signature is cherry blossoms and the inverted pentagram. A powerful onmyōji, Seishirō can control shikigami and confound his opponents in illusions. The assassin defeats Subaru in battle when they meet for the very first time since the events in Tokyo Babylon, but leaves the younger man alive. Subaru believes himself not worthy of killing, but in their final battle at Rainbow Bridge, Seishirō arranges for Subaru to kill him. In the feature film, Subaru and Seishirō annihilate each other in magical combat during the first ten minutes.

=== Nataku ===
Voiced by: Motoko Kumai (Japanese); Mona Marshall (English) in the TV series
Voiced by: Rika Matsumoto (Japanese); Don Fellows (English) in the feature film

Nataku (那吒), an androgynous clone of extreme psychic ability, was born of genetic material of Kazuki Tōjō (塔城 霞月, Tōjō Kazuki), the deceased granddaughter of the president of Tōjō Pharmaceuticals, and her father Masaki. Nataku is sent to retrieve the Sacred Sword by Chairman Tōjō, who wishes to destroy the sword so that Nataku cannot become entangled in the matter of the Promised Day. Nataku battles both Karen and Aoki, the former takes pity on him which causes Nataku to care about him. Nataku is haunted by the memories of their previous life as Kazuki, and they follow Fūma unquestionably as Fūma resembles the person Kazuki cared most for - her father. In the anime, after Fūma is badly wounded by the spell Sorata casts as he dies, he absorbs Nataku's flesh into his own and is healed. In the manga, Nataku dies when Fūma realizes their greatest wish, to die by the hand of the one they love most (Fūma, who resembles Kazuki's father) while protecting the person most important to them (Karen, who resembles Kazuki's mother). In the movie, Seiichirō Aoki kills Nataku and himself by both of them falling from the Sunshine 60 building to their deaths. Nataku was based on the concept of myth-like anime fighter.

In Tsubasa, Nataku is one of the fighters of the City Hall faction. Nataku is also one of the characters who underwent most significant changes: unlike in X, Nataku is a mentally developed adult and takes care of Kazuki, alternate version of X's Kazuki (who substitutes Seishirō's place).

=== Kakyō Kuzuki ===
Voiced by: Yuji Ueda (Japanese); Terrence Stone (English) in the TV series

Kakyō Kuzuki (玖月 牙暁, Kuzuki Kakyō) is a dreamseer in a permanent coma, appearing as a tall man with a sad expression, golden eyes, long, pale hair, and almost always dressed in white. His ability to see the future in dreams was discovered at an early age, and as a result he was kept a prisoner by an unknown political group. Having never seen the outside world, he drew Hokuto Sumeragi into his dreams and fell in love with her after she showed him the sea through her own imagination. However, he foresaw that she would go to her death at the hands of the Sakurazukamori (as seen in the last volume of Tokyo Babylon), and broke out of his room in an effort to stop her; shot by one of his guards with a sniper rifle, he failed to reach her in time and sank into the coma in which he spends the duration of the X story. He came to believe that the future was immutable, and began to wish for his death although unable to kill himself being in a physical coma.

In X he meets and befriends the fledgling dreamseer Kotori Monou within the dreamscape, but realizes that she, too, will soon die at the hands of her older brother Fūma. To grant Kotori's last wish that Kamui should be spared, Kakyō possesses her corpse during its "death dream" and clings to the Sacred Sword, preventing Fūma from removing it from Kotori's body and using it to kill Kamui. However, in doing so Kakyō alerts Fūma to his presence, and the Dragon of Earth hunts down the dreamseer and convinces him that he will grant his wish to die in peace, provided Kakyō aids him as one of the Seven Angels. They grow intimate over times, as Fūma continually consoles Kakyō during his still-existent fits of grief over Hokuto's death.

In the anime, Kakyō is coerced into manipulating Princess Hinoto's own future-seeing dreams, but finally turns against Fūma after encouragement from Hokuto and Kotori that the future is not, after all, unchanging. He enables Hokuto to enter her brother Subaru's dreams and talk him into helping Kamui during the crucial moments of the final battle. At the end of the series he dies peacefully, and his spirit is finally able to join his beloved Hokuto and "go outside".

In Tsubasa, Kakyō is one of the fighters of the City Hall faction. He has the ability to divine the future through his dreams and welcomes Syaoran's group with much less hostility than the rest, as he has foreseen their coming. In the X Tarot set, he represents The Wheel of Fortune.

=== Kusanagi Shiyū ===
Voiced by: Masaki Aizawa (Japanese); Jamieson Price (English) in the TV series
Voiced by: George Nakata (Japanese); Jeff Harding (English) in the feature film

Kusanagi Shiyū (志勇 草薙, Shiyū Kusanagi) is a member of the Japanese Self-Defense Force who is telepathically linked to the plants and animals of the Earth, and thus strongly resents humanity's pollution and destruction of the natural world. Although his punch carries the force of an earthquake, he is the least antisocial of the Dragons of Earth, and the least active in the destruction of Tokyo. He meets Yuzuriha (and is the first man she ever met who can see Inuki) and develops an affection for her; although she falls in love with him, his intentions appear to remain unromantic. He frequently rescues Yuzuriha from death at the hands of other Dragons of Earth and, indeed in the anime, threatens Fūma and ultimately switches sides; as a result he is attacked and grievously wounded by Nataku and Arashi, the latter having also defected to the other side. In the manga, he has, at the very least, expressed personal opinions that run contrary to the goals of the Dragons of Earth—specifically that life is sacred and should never, under any circumstances, be willfully destroyed. He also seems to think that conflicts between nature and humanity should be resolved with as little harm to either as possible. In the movie, he does not show these pacifist qualities and instead actively attacks the Dragons of Heaven without hesitation and is a very violent character. Additionally, his relationship with Yuzuriha Nekoi does not exist in the movie. Later on in the movie he was killed by Fūma, but he survives in the anime television series.

Kusanagi appears twice in Tsubasa: as a player paired up with Nekoi Yuzuriha in Edonis Country and a fighter of the City Hall faction in Tokyo.

=== Shōgo Asagi ===
Voiced by: Toshihiko Seki (Japanese); Rupert Degas (English) in the feature film

Shōgo Asagi (浅黄 笙悟, Asagi Shōgo) is a water master who appears in the motion picture in place of Kakyō, who had not made a formal appearance in the manga during the movie's production. A smart-aleck high school student, he appears to fight for the Dragons of Earth solely to cause trouble, and is actually the first one of either group to contact Kamui after his arrival, telling him through telepathy that they are fighting for the future of the world. He meets his end in the film during his battle with Karen in the subway, when Karen causes a massive explosion that causes them both to be crushed by debris.

Shōgo Asagi also appears in Tsubasa, first in the Hanshin Republic, then in Piffle World as an employee of Tomoyo Daidōji.

== Supporting characters ==
=== Princess Hinoto ===
Voiced by: Aya Hisakawa (Japanese); Bridget Hoffman (English) in the TV series
Voiced by: Yuko Minaguchi (Japanese); Stacey Jefferson (English) in the feature film

Hinoto (丁) is a dreamseer in the employ of the Japanese government, residing in the basement of the Japanese Diet Building. She is blind, deaf, mute, crippled, and must communicate telepathically, but her dreams have never failed to come true. She foresees the battle between the Dragons of Heaven and Earth and the advent of Kamui, but cannot determine which path he will choose. Either way, she foresees that the Dragons of Heaven will lose, but conceals this from them. For a time, she is possessed by her dark half, which causes a disastrous battle to occur within Hinoto's own consciousness (played out on the dreamscape), as well as many complications for the Dragons of Heaven.

The rationale for Hinoto's dark half attempting to destroy Kamui and the other Dragons of Heaven seems to stem from the fact that she foresaw her own death at the hands of Kamui. While Hinoto's good side seems to desire this outcome (either for the simple fact that she wishes to be freed from her duties as a dreamseer, or possibly in that her death could somehow alter the future in favor of the Dragons of Heaven), her evil side is striving to prevent her own death at the expense of the lives of others, and as a result repeatedly attacks the Dragons of Heaven with swarms of shikigami.

Her evil persona has kept her good persona trapped in the dreamscape and continues to set up the Dragons of Heaven in hopes of bringing about their deaths. Kamui suspects her of foul play and relays this to Sorata, who creates a gohōdōji to observe her, which is last seen confronting her for her actions.

In the television series, she kills herself in the dreamscape (thus taking her life in the waking world as well) so as to end her possession and save Kamui. This precipitates the Final Battle. In the movie, she dies while holding Kanoe's dead body (as she was killed earlier by Fūma) as the Diet Building collapses around her.

In the X Tarot set, she is The High Priestess.

=== Kanoe ===
Voiced by: Kaho Kouda (Japanese); Mary Elizabeth McGlynn (English) in the TV series
Voiced by: Atsuko Takahata (Japanese); Denica Fairman (English) in the feature film

Kanoe (庚), Princess Hinoto's younger sister and the primary antagonist, supports the Dragons of Earth mainly to spite her (although, in the motion picture and the manga, it seems that her motivations are more out of love for Hinoto, wishing to free her from her limitations as a dreamseer). She can enter and leave dreams like Hinoto and Kakyō, but cannot see the future unaided. She works as a secretary in the Tokyo Metropolitan Government Building for the governor of Tokyo. She is in a sexual relationship with Yūto, but sometimes she also flirts with Satsuki and (briefly) Fuma Monou.

Kanoe has the ability to spy on the dreams of others, including those of Hinoto and Fūma. The TV series portrays her as truly despising her elder sister, who was always treated better than her. However, when Hinoto commits suicide, Kanoe is crushed and cries for her sister. It is not seen whether Kanoe dies in the anime television series, which may imply that she could still be alive, long after the final battle is over.

In the manga, Kanoe enters Hinoto's dreams when she hears Hinoto crying for help. Unfortunately, Kanoe discovers that her older sister is trapped in the dreamscape and becomes confused when Hinoto's dark side appears and directly confronts her. Soon afterwards, Kamui senses Kanoe's death, though who caused Kanoe's death remains ambiguous.

In the movie, Kanoe is a complete dreamseer, an equal to her sister Hinoto. She is killed by Fūma just before the Final Battle, but not before she can explain her reasons to a crushed Hinoto, ultimately dying in her sister's arms.

=== Tokiko Magami ===
Voiced by: Misa Watanabe (Japanese); Philece Sampler (English) in the TV series

Tokiko Magami (真神 時鼓, Magami Tokiko) is Kamui's aunt and the nurse at Fūma and Kotori's school when Kamui returns to Tokyo from Okinawa. Tokiko attempts to alert Kamui to the significance of his ancestry and of his role in the end of the world, but they are interrupted by a battle at Togakushi Shrine in the manga, while Kamui is highly skeptical of her claim to being his mother's younger sister (despite her unmistakable resemblance to Tōru) in the anime television series. After being attacked by shikigami in the form of "men in black", Tokiko arrives at the Togakushi Shrine severely injured just in time to give birth to the second Sacred Sword before the very eyes of Kamui and Fūma. Tokiko was apparently in contact with Nokoru Imonoyama and the former Chairman of Clamp Academy. Her final message to Kamui is delivered through a video entrusted to the director of Clamp Academy, where she explains the choice Kamui must make and to carefully consider who he wishes to protect as well as what he truly desires for the Earth's fate.

=== Tōru Shirō ===
Voiced by: Kikuko Inoue (Japanese); Julie Ann Taylor (English) in the TV series
Voiced by: Masako Ikeda (Japanese); Liza Ross (English) in the feature film

Tōru Shirō (司狼 斗織, Shirō Tooru) is Kamui's mother and shadow sacrifice, as one of the Magami clan. Tōru burns along with the house that she and Kamui lived in while on Okinawa. It is explained in the anime that she died to postpone or alleviate the disasters that would befall Kamui in the time leading up to the promised day (thus acting as his shadow sacrifice), and in the manga, that she acted as a sacrifice to prevent the premature destruction of the planet itself. Hinoto attributes Tōru's fiery death to the concentrated effect that global warming was having on the Earth. Originally, she was supposed to give birth to the first Sacred Sword, but Saya took her place. Tōru was personally in contact with the former Chairman of Clamp Academy — indeed, Tōru was just ending a phone call with her when the effects of acting as shadow sacrifice of Kamui/the Earth were set into motion, igniting her flesh. Tōru's death occurs just prior to the beginning of the first volume of the manga (chronologically) and is what causes Kamui to return to Tokyo after a six-year absence. In the movie, she dies in a similar fashion by being burned to death, however she was able to give Kamui his Sacred Sword while she was dying and her last words were for Kamui were for him to go to Tokyo for the final battle and informs him about the Dragons of Heaven and the Dragons of Earth at the beginning of the film.

=== Saya Monou ===
Voiced by: Michiko Neya (Japanese); Barbara Goodson (English) in the TV series

Saya Monou (桃生 紗鵺, Monou Saya) is Kotori and Fūma's mother. When they were children, she died giving birth to the first Sacred Sword, which burst forth from her body. This sword is intended to be wielded by Kamui; instead, it is stolen by Nataku and taken by Fūma. It is later revealed that Saya and Kyōgo's relationship was akin to a Lavender marriage: she married him to be at the Togakushi Shrine to take the place of her true love, Tōru Shirō, as the vessel of the Sacred Sword. Kyōgo knows that Saya never loved him romantically, but, regardless, continues to love her; by her part, Saya still had non-romantic affection for him, and her last words in the manga included an apology for not being able to return his feelings. In the TV series her relationship with Tōru is not acknowledged, and neither she nor Kyōgo appear in the X movie.

=== Kyōgo Monou ===
Voiced by: Kōji Ishii (Japanese); Michael McConnohie (English) in the TV series

Fūma and Kotori's father, Kyōgo Monou (桃生 鏡護, Monou Kyōgo) is the resident priest of the Togakushi Shrine. He marries his friend Saya even though he knew that she actually was in love with Tōru and was only marrying him so that she could protect Tōru; filled with remorse by this revelation, she weepingly apologizes to him for her deception, right before she dies in front of him, giving birth to the first Sacred Sword. To fulfill his own destiny, Kyōgo hides the Sacred Sword in the shrine as its sacred object; he swears to protect it with his life and is killed by Nataku as a result. Right before he dies, he reveals to Fūma his destiny as Kamui's twin star.

=== Hokuto Sumeragi ===
Voiced by: Satsuki Yukino (Japanese); Julie Ann Taylor (English) in the TV series

Hokuto Sumeragi (皇 北都, Sumeragi Hokuto) is Subaru's twin sister who was killed by the Sakurazukamori at the end of Tokyo Babylon. While she was still alive, Hokuto became friends with Kakyō after the dreamgazer drew her into his dreams. Being the first person he ever really met, she left a lasting impression on Kakyō. Hokuto is the reason he wants to die—so he can join her in the afterlife. In the manga she appears in his reminiscence, while towards the end of the anime she actually appears to him as a ghost and persuades him to turn against Fūma in order to attempt to change the future. Kakyō enables her to cross into her brother's dreams, where she urges Subaru to rise from his catatonia and continue the fight, an important action that later buys Kamui enough time to understand what he should do.

=== Daisuke Saiki ===
Voiced by: Kishō Taniyama (Japanese); Edward Villa (English) in the TV series

Seiichirō's nephew Daisuke Saiki (砕軌 玳透, Saiki Daisuke) is also a wind magician, though not of Seiichirō's calibre. Saiki and Kamui initially do not get along very well, as the stoic and strictly by-the-rules Saiki was not completely convinced that Kamui was the one on which the fate of humanity rested; later, they understand each other better and become friends. Saiki lives to protect Hinoto, whom he seems to have affections for. In the manga, he is brutally decapitated by Fūma while protecting Hinoto; in the anime, he was killed by a powerful blast by Fūma.

In Tsubasa, he appears as Subaru's replacement as a fighter of the Tower faction in Tokyo.

=== Sōhi and Hien ===
Sōhi (蒼氷, Sōhi) and Hien (緋炎, Hien) are the twin daughters of a family that has protected Hinoto for generations. Out of respect for the dreamgazer, they address her as "Princess" (姫様, Hime-sama). In the TV series, they are actually Hinoto's shikigami.

=== Nokoru Imonoyama ===
Nokoru Imonoyama (妹之山 残, Imonoyama Nokoru) is the former chairman of the elementary level student board and current director of the famous Clamp Academy, as well as one of the Clamp School Detectives, along with Akira Ijyūin and Suoh Takamura. A child of the fabulously wealthy zaibatsu Imonoyama family (who, in fact, founded the Clamp Academy), Nokoru has practically limitless resources at his command. He personally knew Magami Tokiko through his relative, the former Chairperson of Clamp Academy, and following the events leading to Fūma's awakening as the Kamui of the Dragons of Earth, Nokoru graciously provides the Dragons of Heaven housing, admitting the younger Seals (Kamui, Yuzuriha, Arashi, Sorata and for a while Subaru) to the Clamp Academy at the junior and senior high school levels (and college in Subaru's case).

=== Suoh Takamura ===
Suoh Takamura (鷹村 蘇芳, Takamura Suō) is the former secretary of the elementary level student board of Clamp Academy and currently the personal bodyguard of Nokoru Imonoyama. He is a child of the Takamura family, infamous for their prodigious skills in ninjutsu. Suoh does not appear in the anime.

=== Akira Ijyūin ===
Akira Ijyūin (伊集院 玲, Ijūin Akira), the former treasurer of the elementary level student board of Clamp Academy, is currently working for Nokoru Imonoyama (presumably as an accountant, and possibly his personal chef on the side). Strangely enough, Akira has two mothers, who are later revealed to be sisters. Also, Akira is secretly the infamous thief 20 Mensō ("20 Faces"). He's married to his childhood sweetheart, Utako. Akira does not appear in the anime.

=== Keiichi Segawa ===
Kamui's classmate in CLAMP Academy after Kamui transfers, Keiichi Segawa (瀬川 景一, Segawa Keiichi) is a boy who enthusiastically tries to become friends with Kamui. Despite the fact he is often seen with a cheerful smile, he dislikes earthquakes greatly as his father was killed in the earthquake that resulted with the spirit barrier at Nakano was destroyed. Keiichi first appears in volume 11 of the manga.

== Reception ==
While enjoying the narrative, Mike Crandol from Anime News Network found Kamui among others supporting characters likable due to their early brooding personalities. Manga News felt that the main cast became more enjoyable when Subaru helps Kamui to abandon his catatonic status to face reality and become a more appealing hero. Within other characters, Subaru and Seishiro were praised. Anime News Network referred to his confrontation with Seishirō in the TV series was praised mainly because how their character designs were updated from the ones from Tokyo Babylon. Beveridge also agreed with Bertschy, calling the episode of their final battle one of the best ones from the series focused on how their backgrounds are shown and tragic elements portrayed. Sandra Scholes from Active Anime shared similar feelings calling Subaru "one of the most endearing characters" within the series based on his tragic backstory and his fight against Seishiro. Finding most characters interesting, THEM Anime Reviews found Sorata and Arashi's bond as one of the best written relationships too due to how close they become and the plot twists the television series they give them for the climax. DVD Talk had positive thoughts about the characters' relationships, finding them "special" and praised the amount of violence provided by them in the anime's second half.

However, many critics focused on the relationship between Kamui and Fūma, many considering it one of the strongest areas in Rintaro's 1996 film as they are major focused on the tragic storyline rather than the supporting cast who get little screentime. Animerica was positive by how the drama focused on Kamui, Fuma and Kotori, finding it intense. Ex claimed that the audience who has not read Tokyo Babylon would not understand the personal vendetta Subaru has for Seishiro and that instead they kill each other quickly in the movie's initial scenes. the book Anime Classics Zettai!: 100 Must-See Japanese Animation Masterpieces noted that both the feature and television series provided attractive adaptations of Clamp's manga, with the film achieving an appealing atmosphere based the combination of animation and music while complimenting the character designs. In comparison to the film, Zac Bertschy from Anime News Network felt that Fuma's transformation into the series' villain is more realistic in the television series. Fuma has stand out as an appealing villain due to the crimes he commits with the original manga portraying during gore. Manga News enjoyed his interactions with Seishiro, as they form a friendship while causing an earthquake, coming across as strong villains in the process.

While there was no shonen ai unlike in Tokyo Babylon, Subaru's relationship with the man he loves, Seishiro, also attracted writers. Manga News stated that while Subaru and Seishiro's fight was one of the most anticipated ones based on how Subaru changed ever since his sister was killed, he still could not bring himself to stop loving Seishiro. This is further noted by Subaru's depressed portrayal when Seishiro activates Hokuto's spell to make Subaru kill him, ruining his will to live in the process. Nevertheless, in a later review, Manga News found that while Subaru was still highly affected by Seishiro's death, Fuma giving him the eye from his dead body positively affected him. Since Seishiro's wish was giving Subaru his eye to fill the gap in the Subaru's blind one, the character now obtained a legacy from his love that gave him hope to live. Several fans reading the series have wondered whether Clamp was hinting at a romantic relationship between Kamui and Fūma. In the book Understanding Manga and Anime writer Robin E. Brenner stated Clamp had none of those intentions, and compared them with the more explicit relationship between Subaru and Seishirō.

The original voice actors received praise, most particularly Kamui's, Tomokazu Seki. Tomokazu Sugita's portrayal of Subaru in X was praised by Merumo who also enjoyed the older characterization envisioned in this series. On the other hand, there were mixed responses to the English cast for not being as appealing as the Japanese ones. A big exception according to Anime News Network was Kotori's actress. DVD Talk found the English actors suitable for their roles in the television series.
