= Kamui Shiro =

Fictional character from X

- X character
- Kamui by Clamp
- First appearance: X: Prelude (1992)
- Created by: Clamp
- Voiced by: Japanese: Tomokazu Seki (film); Kenichi Suzumura (TV series); Mamoru Miyano (Tokyo Revelations); English: Alan D. Marriott (film); Steve Cannon (TV series); Micah Solusod (Tokyo Revelations)

In-universe information
- Aliases: Kamui of the Dragons of Heaven; Light Kamui
- Weapon: Rapier
- Relatives: Tōru Shirō (mother); Tokiko Magami (aunt)

Kamui Shiro (Japanese: 司狼 神威, Hepburn: Shirō Kamui), also written as Kamui Shirou, is a fictional character that was created by Clamp and introduced as the protagonist of the manga series X. Kamui is a young esper who returns to his home, Tokyo, after a six-year absence following his mother's last will. According to her, he can change the world's fate. He can either join the groups a Dragons of Heaven or Dragons of Earth and fight for mankind or the nature, respectively. Kamui has also appeared in the animated adaptations of X, in which he follows a different course of action, and he also appears as an alternative persona from a post-apocalyptic Tokyo in the manga Tsubasa: Reservoir Chronicle.

Clamp's head writer Nanase Ohkawa originally created Kamui during high school as character in a story involving warriors fighting for justice. His incorporation to X includes themes Ohkawa thought about since she was a student, such a possibility of an evil alter ego and whether mankind is more important than the Earth. The animated versions of X portray Kamui as neither as a strong nor a weak character due to the staff's preference. The character has been played by voice actors in the animated series including the Japanese Tomokazu Seki (X film), Kenichi Suzumura (X TV series) and Mamoru Miyano (Tsubasa). His English actors are Alan D. Marriott (X film), Steve Cannon (X TV series) and Micah Solusod (Tsubasa).

Publications for manga, anime and other media gave a positive response to Kamui Shiro. His character development in the series made them appreciate his role in the story as well his tragic role in the narrative. Kamui has also been popular within Clamp's fanbase, the authors often received positive feedback about him in the manga's beginning. Kamui's portrayal in Tsubasa also garnered positive responses through his encounters with the lead character Syaoran.

== Creation and development ==
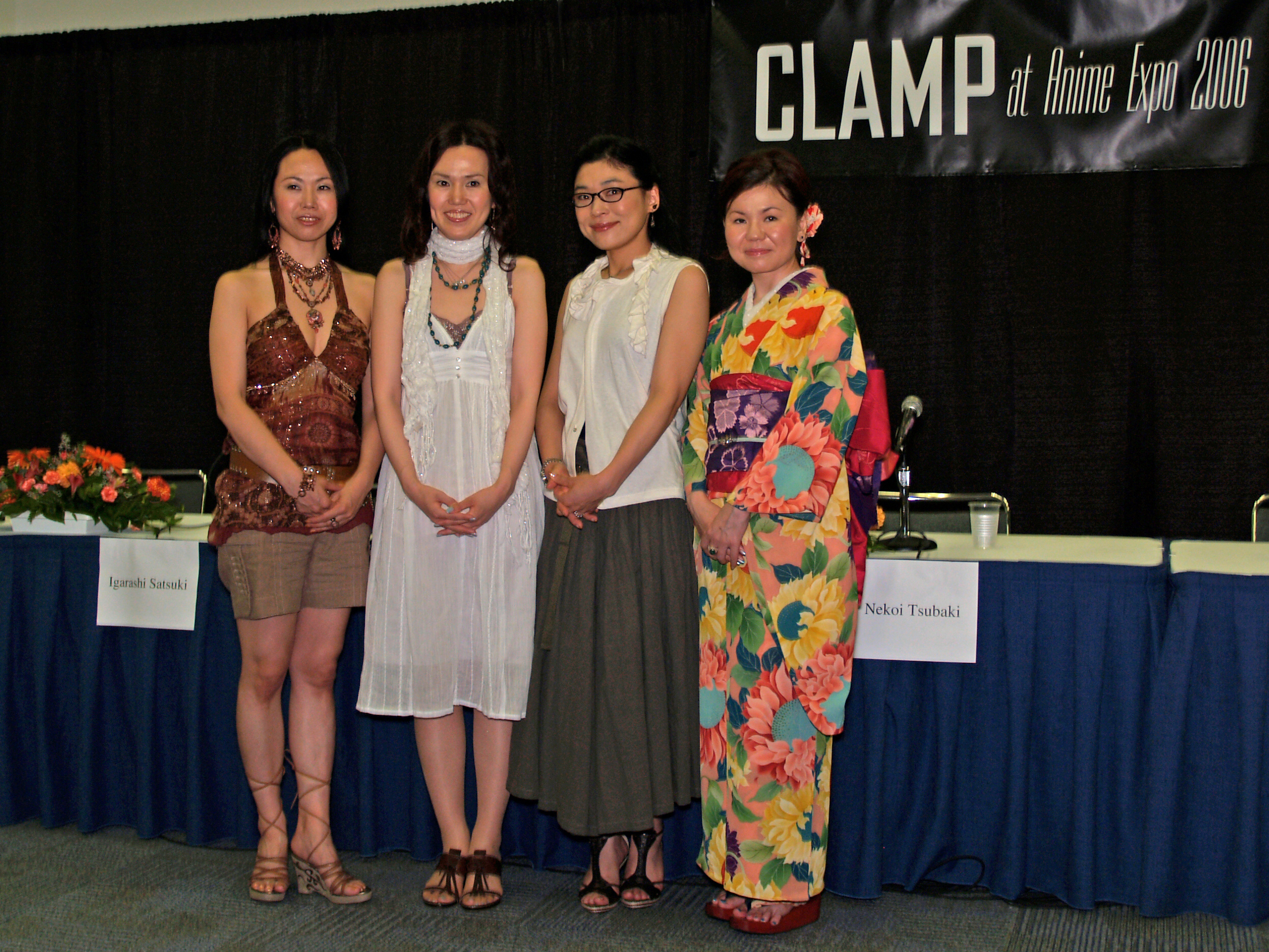
The four Clamp artists (from left to right): Satsuki Igarashi, Nanase Ohkawa, Mick Nekoi, and Mokona Apapa created Kamui

Kamui originates from a story Clamp's head writer Nanase Ohkawa wrote during high school. Kamui was one of the story's lead characters, who were fighting a losing battle for "justice". After finishing Clamp School Detectives, Clamp decided to write a story in which readers see the development of two groups, the Dragons of Heaven and the Dragons of Earth led by Kamui and Fūma, respectively. Several of the series' characters were created using the Osamu Tezuka's Star System technique were old designs incorporated in new characters with Kamui's exception which proved challenging due to his role. He was made to stand apart from other characters, and Ohkawa called his hairstyle and school uniform average. Clamp's lead artist Mokona believes this was influenced by the heroic character-type upon which he was based. As a result, Mokona felt that Kamui's final design fits her idea of the hero needed for the series. Their first illustration of Kamui gave them a feeling of Ashura, a character from RG Veda based on his appearance in Tokyo's destroyed area.

The authors originally wanted to name the character from another character they created in series, but because the plot required him to have a meaningful name, the idea was scrapped and he was named "Kamui" (Japanese for "The One Who Represents God's will"). Kamui was originally written as a high-school student from Kotori Monou's point of view to appeal to the audience of females. Kamui, however, was not popular with the readers, so Clamp rewrote parts of his personality. Mokona describes him as a "crazy dog", but readers disliked Kotori more than they disliked Kamui. Clamp kept the identity of Kamui's father hidden from Kamui. The artists said should the series continue, further exposition of Kamui's heritage would be developed.

Kamui's decisions reflects one of X's main themes; caring for humans even if does not help the Earth. Ohkawa considers that while it common sense that people care about protecting the planet, it is more important to love friends and relatives. Ohkawa also applied to Kamui and Fūma ideas she had as a child, such as a dual nature, because she states people can be considered good or evil. As a result of Kamui losing Kotori and all of his relatives, Ohkawa emphazed Kamui's friendship with Fūma because she believes his feelings have become stronger. Across the manga, Kamui meets Subaru Sumeragi, whose rivalry with Seishirō Sakurazuka parallels Kamui's rivalry with Fūma Monou. Clamp referred to Kamui and Subaru as siblings; Kamui is supposed to learn from Subaru's final fight with Seishirō and avoid his final fight against Fuuma having the same tragic conclusion.

=== Alternative portrayals ===
For the X television series, director Yoshiaki Kawajiri decided not to explore Kamui's backstory early in the series and to focus more on his cold demeanor. Kawajiri considered Kamui weak because of how much it costs him to express emotions. As a result, he portraying Kamui as a strong person, though his weakness becomes noticeable as the narrative progresses. He is voiced in the film by Tomokazu Seki in Japanese and Alan D. Marriott in English. Kamui is voiced in the television series by Kenichi Suzumura in Japanese and Steve Cannon in English.

Because Kamui did not have many lines in the original video animation, Suzumura lacked a full impression of him before more of his character was explored in the television series. Suzumura found his role complicated because he understands Kamui is neither the weakest nor the strongest character. Voicing Kamui meant Suzumura debuted as a singer for an X CD. In August 2011, Suzumura married singer and actor Maaya Sakamoto; as a gift, Clamp made an illustration of Kamui holding Tomoyo from Tsubasa: Reservoir Chronicle, since the latter is voiced by Sakamoto.

A common trope Clamp enjoys using is identical characters. When the manga Tsubasa: Reservoir Chronicle was made, Subaru was envisioned as Kamui's twin brother. Clamp had fun writing this version of these characters despite not being identical brothers. Subaru was intended to have a larger role in Tsubasa, mentoring the protagonist Syaoran, but he was replaced by Seishirō. As in the original Clamp works Tokyo Babylon and X, Subaru was chasing Seishirō; Clamp decided to reverse this for Tsubasa, making Seishirō the one chasing both brothers. In Tsubasa Tokyo Revelations OVAs, Kamui is voiced by Mamoru Miyano in Japanese and Micah Solusod in English.

== Characterization and themes ==
Kamui is introduced in X as an antisocial person who often becomes distant with his childhood friends Kotori and Fuma. He is driven by the loss of his mother who taught his child about his importance in regards to the world's future. His given name implies the two possible natures he can give to the planet through his supernatural powers and hidden potential. Despite his mannerism, Kamui reveals his personality is a facade when Hinoto shows him the future death of Kotori as well as his relation with the end of the world which heavily angers him. This later causes him to reflect on his actions and reveal his true self as he shows his real kind demeanor towards Kotori to protect her from Hinoto's vision. Following the death of his aunt, Kamui shows his true resolve in regards to the apocalypse; He is not interested in society or the planet's pollution but instead wants to protect his two childhood friends. This causes the transformation of Fuma into the opposite Kamui who kills Kotori to bring despair to his former friend.

Kotori's death causes a major impact into Kamui, but manages to recover thanks to one of the Dragons of Heaven, Subaru Sumeragi, who would become his mentor in the narrative. He accepts the path of the Dragons of Heaven as he expresses his love towards mankind. From this point on, Kamui becomes more concerned about his role in the Armageddon due to the lives his enemies might take in the process but is powerless against the sadistic Fuma. His weakness is further explored as, unlike the other Dragons of Heaven, Kamui is unable to create a magical barrier need to protect areas around Tokyo to protect.

== Appearances ==
=== In the X manga ===
In X, Kamui is introduced as a young esper who returns to Tokyo after a six-year absence following his mother's death. Contrary to the kindheartedness with which his childhood friends Fūma and Kotori Monou remember him, Kamui appears distanced and cold, and avoids interacting with them. Following his arrival to Tokyo, Kamui is observed by two groups known as the Dragons of Heaven and the Dragons of Earth, who are interested in Kamui's ability to change the world's fate. Princess Hinoto contacts Kamui and warns him if he does not become the Dragons of Heaven's leader, Kotori will be murdered. Still confused about what he should do, Kamui meets his aunt Tokiko Magami, who sacrifices herself to create the weapon "Sacred Sword" (神剣, Shinken), which Kamui must wield to change Earth's fate.

After Tokiko's death, Kamui gains a full understanding about his mission. He can either become a Dragon of Heaven and protect mankind from extinction or he can become a Dragon of Earth and destroy mankind to protect the Earth. As a result of starting to care about Fūma and Kotori again, Kamui instantly becomes a Dragon of Heaven. Fūma awakens a sadistic alter-ego known as the Dragon of Earth's "Kamui". The new Fūma kills Kotori to torture Kamui but escapes after the arrival of the Dragons of Heaven. One of them, Subaru Sumeragi, helps Kamui recover from his traumatic experience by encouraging him to grant his own wish, which is recovering the original Fūma.

For the next month, Kamui starts living with the Dragons of Heaven Sorata Arisugawa, Arashi Kishū and Yuzuriha Nekoi, which helps him form new friendships while often meeting Subaru. He and the Dragons of Heaven work with Hinoto's assistance to protect Tokyo's barriers from the Dragons of Earth and avoid the Earth's destruction. Kamui encounters Fūma several times during his fights but is unable to defeat him. In the series' latest chapters before its indefinite hiatus, Kamui summons the Sacred Sword and again encounters Fūma alongside Subaru, who tells him he will never defeat Fūma unless he identifies his true wish.

=== In X adaptations and other series ===
While the manga's serialization was put in hiatus, leaving the story unconcluded, its animated adaptations show Kamui reaching different fates. In the X film, Kamui refuses to side with the Dragon of Heaven until Fūma and Kotori are taken by Hinoto's sister Kanoe. The Dragons of Heaven continuously fight the Dragon of Earth, and both sides suffer casualties that result in the destruction of Tokyo. Fūma kills Kotori in front of Kamui to take the Sacred Sword from her. Kamui unseals the Sacred Sword his mother gave him and decapitates Fūma. As the match ends, Kamui—the sole survivor of the war— starts crying while holding Fūma's head. In the television series, Kamui goes to fight Fūma after Hinoto's suicide unseals the Sacred Sword. He tries to kill Fūma after learning his loss was predetermined. Kamui is severely wounded in combat and is saved by Subaru, who again encourages him to grant his own wish and Kamui faces Fūma. In the final battle, Kamui sacrifices his life to create a barrier that will protect mankind and passes Fūma his will, which restores his personality.

An alternative version of Kamui appears as one of the vampire twins Seishirō is seeking in Clamp's crossover series Tsubasa: Reservoir Chronicle. Kamui leads the fighters of the City Hall faction (alternative versions of the Dragons of Earth) in a battle to protect their water source, although he is actually protecting his twin Subaru, who is sleeping underwater. Kamui often fights an alternative version of Fuma, who leads the Tokyo Tower faction. When encountering a dimension traveler called Syaoran, Subaru awakens after Syaoran retrieves a magical feather that sealed him. Before leaving Tokyo, Kamui gives his regenerative blood to the dying sorcerer Fai D. Flowright as part of a negotiation to restore Tokyo's water. Kamui and Subaru then leave Tokyo and reunite with Fuma in the epilogue. Outside manga and anime, Kamui also appears as a playable character in two video games based on the series; X: Unmei no Sentaku. He is also the subject of the seventh CD of the audio drama series X Character Files, in which Kenichi Suzumura provides his voice.

== Reception ==
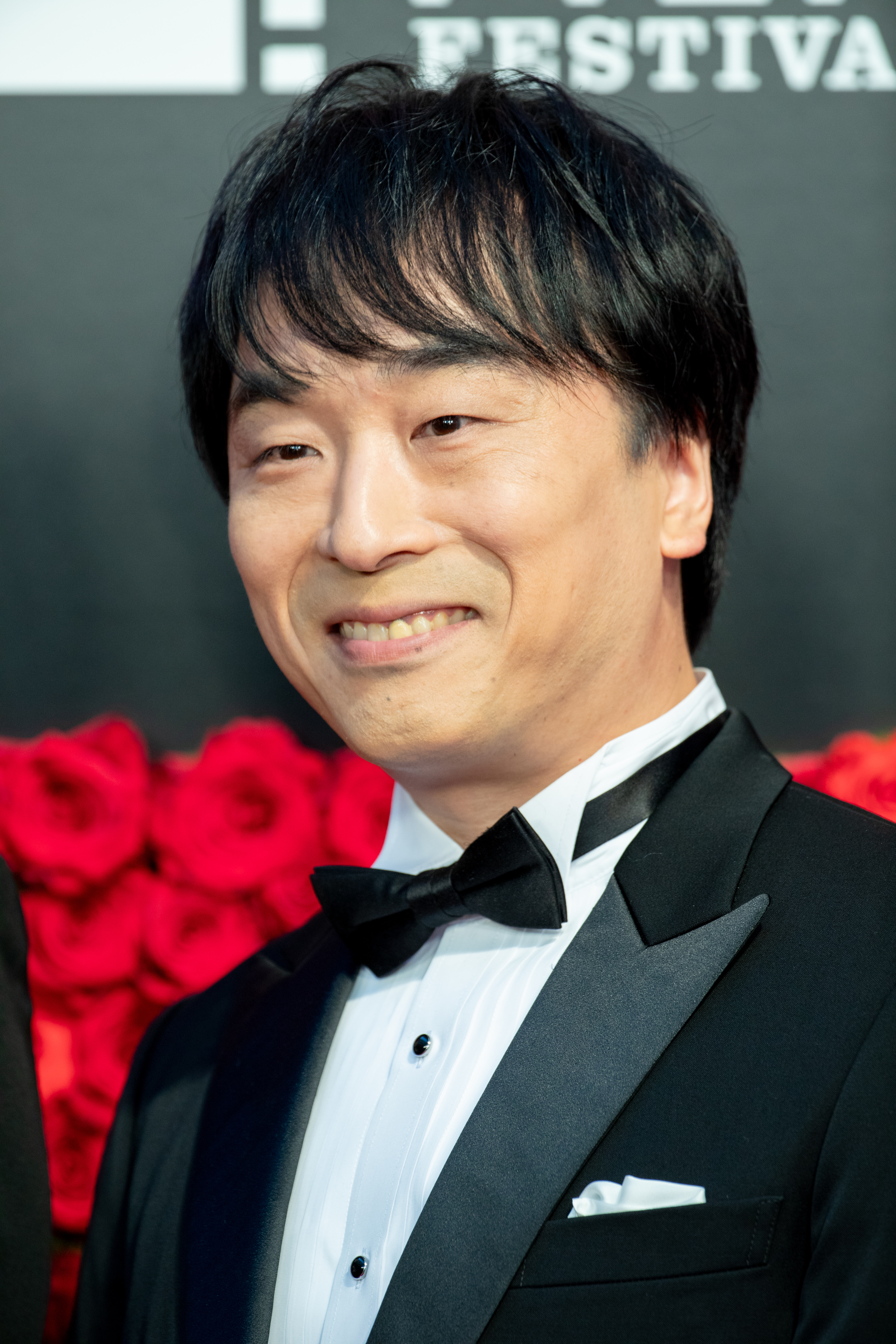
Tomokazu Seki's portrayal of Kamui was the subject of praise.

=== Popularity and critical response ===
Kamui received mixed reactions from publications for manga and anime with critics being divided on whether he was sympathetic or not. Reviewing the second omnibus volume, Matthew Warner from The Fandom Post stated that while Kamui was still a bit unpleasant, he was at least becoming a little "more likable" now that the audience gets to see some of his memories. However, he found the drama surrounding Kamui's choice unconvincing, explaining how it was evident which side Kamui would choose due to the sides seeming so clear cut, which he thought was a pity, and that when the goals of the villains "are so evil and the heroes are the ones getting friendly with" Kamui, it is not difficult to deduce "which side the main character is going to end up on.". Reviewing the film, Bamboo Dong from Anime News Network praised Tomokazu Seki's performance as Kamui but also thought that the English language cast "performed well" as well, although some of them "were poorly cast.". When the producer of the 2018 anime Karakuri Circus, Masao Maruyama, was asked about holding auditions for the main character, he explained that he thought a lesser-known actor was "best" for a new role, citing himself casting Tomokazu Seki as Kamui through an audition, among other examples. He also explained that, in his opinion, even if somebody is at first "a little bad", if they have "a good feel for" their character and "can express the process of their character's growth", getting better over time, it will fit the piece more.

Mike Crandol from Anime News Network called the English dub "perfect" but found the main trio "unlikeable", saying that while it is understandable that Kamui is angsty and bitter, Crandol quickly grew tired of "his unrelenting 'leave me alone or I'll kill you' attitude". Reviewing the second DVD, Andy Hanley from UK Anime Network found that while Kamui's backstory made his personality understandable, it did not "make him any less frustrating to watch", especially when compared to similar anime protagonists who were "far more engaging.". Reviewing the third DVD, Zac Bertschy from Anime News Network noted that though Kamui remained his brooding, distanced self, he did manage to develop a little as the TV show went on. Concerning the English dub, he called it "average" and thought Cannon lacked Suzumura's emotional range, describing Cannon's Kamui as "snotty and defiant across the board". Reviewing the fourth DVD, Chris Beveridge from Mania Entertainment said that Kamui's backstory "as a cute if dark youth" added "a new dimension to" his character and finding out how he dealt with his powers growing up "goes a long way in explaining his present style", both verbally and visually. Reviewing the eighth DVD, Beveridge said that when it came to Kamui and Fuma, they had their "own level of epic sadness and tragedy" even though he preferred the subplot about Sorata and Arashi.

Robert Nelson of THEM Anime Reviews said that though Kamui "may start off as" immature and uncaring, he does mature and show compassion towards the people he wants to protect. He felt that as Kamui's past is revealed to the audience, they could "truly identify with the burden that he holds on his shoulders.". In a later review of the whole anime, Beveridge, now writing for The Fandom Post, thought the drama of the supporting characters was a distraction "from the overall drama involving Fuma and Kamui.". Concerning the complete series' packaging, he thought Kamui looked good on the first volume, being simply done with touches of both somberness and elegance.

Kamui's appearance in Tsubasa: Reservoir Chronicle was popular and he was voted the sixth most-popular character in the second poll. Anime News Network's Carlo Santos' opinion of Kamui's appearance in the manga was negative, saying it started off "with a whimper", that he is "mostly there just to look cool", and thought he spent too much time brooding over water. He further criticized Clamp for "irritatingly obtuse" writing, specifically using a line by Kamui where he says he is not giving "it" to Fuma because "only 20 pages later do we realize they were talking about water", and for appearing to get "so caught up in the thrill of X fanservice . . . that the idea of giving their characters interesting, Tsubasa-specific storylines just went out the window.". However, he praised the art in the Kamui vs. Kurogane fight. Reviewing volume 16 of the manga, Sakura Eries of Mania Entertainment said learning about Kamui's "connection with Syaoran's old friend Seishiro" "at the same time" as finding out Syaoran is a clone made "for somewhat confusing storytelling.". Reviewing volume 17, now for The Fandom Post, Eries found Kamui and his brother bizarre and freaky and, as "a Tsubasa-only reader", overall found the Acid Tokyo arc bizarre and confusing but noted that the vampire twins' "presence works out conveniently enough for" plot reasons. Reviewing "Tsubasa Tokyo Revelations", Beveridge thought the way the X characters were used worked very well, calling the OVA's plot about Sakura's feathers "helping to hold the last remnants of" Kamui's world together "really engaging". He noted there were "some neat little twists", like where Kamui came from, so much so that it could be made into its own show. He also noted similarities between Syaoran and Kamui, calling them "neat", but that they were "pushed to the side to some extent" as the story focused on revelations about the other Syaoran.

=== Analysis ===
Writing for The New York Times, Charles Solomon noted that Kamui's design was "slender" and "androgynous" while discussing Clamp's art styles. Kamui is also established as a Christ figure. Kamui is prophesied to return to Tokyo as one who will determine humanity's fate. The construction of Kamui as a messiah is reinforced by his miraculous birth and given name; "Kamui", like "Christ", alludes to the character's nature.

In the book Understanding Manga and Anime, writer Robin E. Brenner noted that Kamui and Fuma's interactions with each other came off as "intimate" to Western readers, but said that while "fans may speculate that Kamui and Fuma are more than friends", Clamp did "not intend them to be read as romantically involved.". Brenner juxtaposed them with Subaru and Seishiro, saying the latter relationship was "more sexually charged" and this, combined with knowledge of the earlier Clamp manga Tokyo Babylon, which explicitly established their relationship as a romantic one, proved that Kamui and Fuma just had an intense friendship. Analyzing the workings of the X universe and Kamui's destiny, the authors of Anime Classics Zettai! said that only Kamui has free will, "but even he can only select from two set choices, both of them equally bad.". They said that regardless of which side he chooses, he will be forced to kill someone he cares about. They juxtapose the film and the television series' handling of the theme of destiny versus free will thus:

While the movie glosses over these complications and leaves Kamui to play out his preordained role to the bitter end, the TV series spends a great deal of time exploring the question of free will and the paradox inherent in Kamui's position, and these issues play a major role in the climax of the story.

Comic Book Resources's Timothy Donohoo noted that although Kamui is one of the very few survivors in the film, he is "traumatized by the dire course of action that he had been forced to take.".
