= Fuma Monou =

Fictional character from X

- X character
- Fūma Monou, as illustrated by Clamp
- First appearance: X volume 1, chapter 1 (1992)
- Created by: Clamp
- Voiced by: Japanese: Ken Narita (film); Junichi Suwabe (TV series); Yūji Kishi (Tsubasa: Reservoir Chronicle); English: Adam Henderson (film); Crispin Freeman (TV series); Joel McDonald (Tsubasa: Reservoir Chronicle')

In-universe information
- Aliases: Kamui of the Dragons of Earth; Dark Kamui
- Weapon: Rapier
- Relatives: Kyōgo Monou (father); Saya Monou (mother); Kotori Monou (sister)

Fuma Monou (Japanese: 桃生 封真, Hepburn: Monou Fūma), also written Fuuma Monou, is a fictional character created by the artists Clamp introduced in their manga series X. Fuma appears to be an ordinary, young man who is friends with protagonist Kamui Shiro. However, his frequent encounters with Kamui and Kamui's power has made him develop a cold-blooded alter-ego, who joins the Dragons of Earth to eliminate mankind, preserve the Earth and kill Kamui's own group, the Dragons of Heaven. Fuma also appears in an animated film and television series based on the manga, both of which have a different outcome because Clamp did not finish the X manga. An alternative version of the character has appeared in the Clamp's manga, Tsubasa: Reservoir Chronicle, as a rival of another Kamui.

Clamp writer Nanase Ohkawa created Fuma knowing his fate as the Kamui of the Dragons of Earth, and her friends looked forward to the characterization. Fuma's design changed, because he was too similar to Kamui. The team found Fuma one of the most difficult characters to write and illustrate because of his silence, and his actions were considered too gruesome. A number of voice actors played Fuma in his animated appearances. Critical response to the character has been positive. The manga artists called Fuma's change from a kind guy to a mass murderer one of the strongest and darkest in their careers. Fuma's new personality, his relationship with Kamui and their occasional clashes (most notably in the film directed by Rintaro) were cited as the series' most appealing aspects.

== Creation and development ==
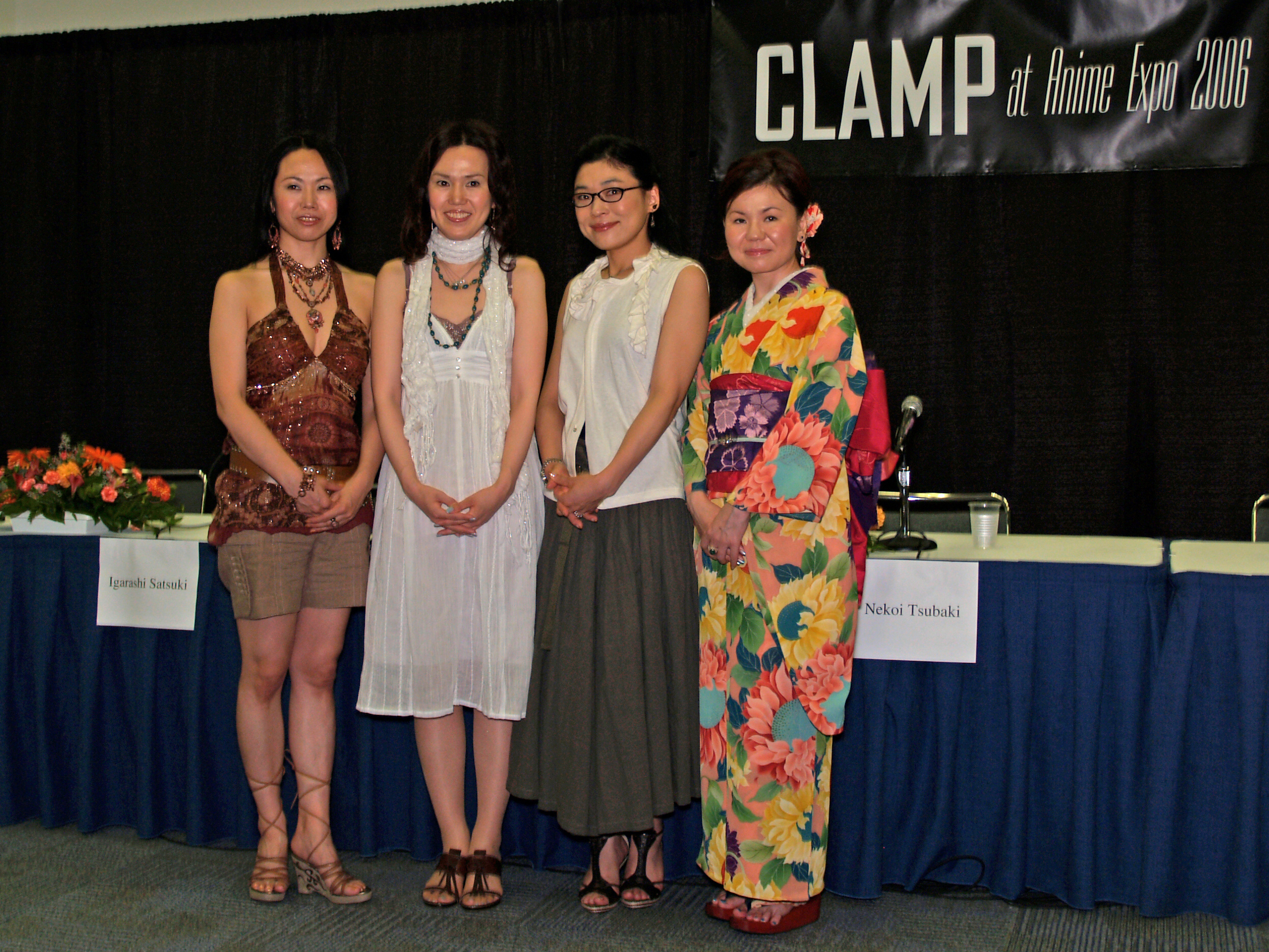
The four Clamp artists (left to right) Satsuki Igarashi, Nanase Ohkawa, Mick Nekoi, and Mokona Apapa created Fuma.

The manga artists group Clamp created the manga X after their editor, Aoki, saw a sketch involving Fuma Monou and main character Kamui Shiro. Fuma was very different from his final version: a more-cheerful person who later appeared in the manga as Keiichi Segawa, one of Kamui's high-school students. Early in the series, Clamp head writer Nanase Ohkawa told her fellow artists about Fuma's future change into a villain. Ohkawa applied to Kamui and Fuma ideas she had during middle school, such as a person's dual nature and how people can be considered good or evil. Kamui meets Tokyo Babylon protagonist Subaru Sumeragi, whose rivalry with Seishiro Sakurazuka parallels Kamui's rivalry with Fuma. Clamp referred to Kamui and Subaru as siblings; Kamui is supposed to learn from Subaru's final fight with Seishiro, so his final fight against Fuma does not have the same tragic conclusion.

Fuma's transformation from a supporting character to the main villain was difficult for Clamp, since his sister Kotori Monou would die during this transformation. They introduced Fuma and Kotori over eight volumes due to the storyline's violence, and even readers who disliked Kotori expressed sorrow at her death. Since the series has a number of talkative characters, Fuma would be more of a silent person; most of his dialogue involves Kamui. In his early appearances Fuma was one of Clamp's worst silent characters according to the authors themselves as he barely had dialogue only when involving his sister and Kamui, making them to look forward to his transformation into a villain. Fuma murdering his sister was one of Clamp's most gruesome scenes. They persisted, despite editorial opposition, because they had already foreseen it in one of Kamui's dreams. Fuma's murder of Daisuke Saiki was also opposed because of its violence, but the editors decided to rely on reader reaction.

Clamp artist Mokona felt that Fuma was the hardest character to draw, since they had to make him resemble other characters such as Kusanagi Shiyū when Yuzuriha Nekoi sees him. Clamp avoided the idea of Seiichiro Aoki (a character based on their editor) meeting Fuma, since they would be forced to make Fuma androgynous. Artist Satsuki Igarashi found drawing the Dragons of Heaven and Earth at the same time difficult because of their individual clothing, which made her wish that they wore identical outfits.

In the Japanese X film, Fuma is voiced by Ken Narita in Japanese and Adam Henderson in English; the character is voiced by Junichi Suwabe in the television series. Suwabe found voicing Fuma difficult due to his dual personality: one kind, and the other cold-hearted. He also noted that the X manga was very popular in Japan, and he wanted to meet audience expectations. Suwabe befriended Kamui's actor, Kenichi Suzumura, while recording the anime. Crispin Freeman replaced Suwabe for the English dub of the television series. In Tsubasa: Reservoir Chronicle OVAs, Fuma is voiced by Yūji Kishi in Japanese and by Joel McDonald in English. Kishi married voice actress Mika Kikuchi, who played Mokona Modoki in Tsubasa, in 2009; Clamp celebrated with illustrations of Fuma marrying Mokona.

== Characterization and themes ==
Fuma is a quiet high school student who befriend Kamui alongside his sister Kotori when they were children. Despite not showing any talent like the most prominent characters of the series, Fuma is able to pass the magical barriers created by Sorata Arisugawa much to his own surprise. Soon the mysteries within Fuma's role in the upcoming armageddon become more obvious when his father is killed by Nataku and uses his last forces to tell him he is Kamui's "twin star", while a woman able to see the future instructs him to kill him if he wants to save his sister. Fuma is conflicted about these messages as he still retains his bond for his friend ever his their childhood where he used to see Kamui as an innocent kid. However, Fuma develops his alter-ego when Kamui becomes a member of the Dragons of the Heavens. Fuma suddenly changes into a sadistic man who tortures Kamui and brutally kills his own sister. This new Fuma sides with Kanoe and the Dragons of Earth in order to accomplish the objective of destroying mankind.

As Kamui's foil, Fuma develops the desire to grant other people's wish. Despite his violent actions, Fuma keeps a kind smile. During his acts of genocide, the ruthless Fuma still remains as mystery as he meets a young girl and warns her to leave the city with her mother as he plans to create an earthquake that will destroy the city. Kanoe herself becomes scared of Fuma being unable to understand what is his desire or true self. Following the death of one of his allies, Seishiro Sakurazuka, Fuma explains own philosophy in regards to his desire; Should a person lose his will to live, he would personally kill him had he been important to him to show how the bond between the two of them is important. In later chapters, Fuma's personality becomes confusing to his enemies as he kills his ally Nataku who had developed affection to him much to Fuma's sadness. As a result, it is noted that Fuma's alterego himself does not enjoy his acts of violence or the goal of the Dragons of the Earth of eliminating mankind.

== Appearances ==
=== In the X manga ===
Fuma is introduced in the X manga as a kind, gentle person whose quietness intimidates his peers. He helps his father, Kyogo; dotes on his younger sister, Kotori, and excels at high-school sports. Fuma and Kotori were childhood friends of Kamui Shiro, who wanted to marry Kotori. Like the young Kamui promised to protect Kotori, Fuma promised to protect him. Kamui later leaves Tokyo and becomes a delinquent; Fuma and Kotori's mother dies, creating the weapon known as Sacred Sword which Kyogo hides. When Kamui returns to the city as a teenager, the cyborg Nataku attacks Kyogo and steals the Sacred Sword; Fuma's dying father tells him that he is Kamui's twin star. After that, Kamui's aunt dies, creating another Sacred Sword like Fuma's mother. Following this, Kamui is chosen as a member of the Dragons of Heaven, a group with the duty of saving mankind. This automatically causes Fuma to be forced to become a Dragon of Earth, attacking Kamui and killing Kotori with new powers and the second Sacred Sword. As the Dragons of Earth reunite with Fuma, Nataku returns the Sacred Sword. Both Fuma and Kamui seal their respective Sacred Swords until the day Armageddon begins.

The new Fuma destroys areas of the city with the other Dragons of Earth, and reminds whoever sees him of the person about whom they care the most. After his transformation into a Dragon of Earth, Fuma refers to himself as "Kamui" (神威). Fuma, as the Kamui of the Dragons of Earth, can sense the heartfelt wishes of others. However, he grants wishes to the characters with whom he interacts, which often lead to their death or that of a loved ones. As he murders his enemies, Fuma disappointed by the fact that mankind wish to die for others rather than live. Following the destruction of most of Tokyo with only one barrier still intact, Kamui again encounters him. Fuma tells him that Kamui will never defeat him unless he discovers his true wish, and tells Kakyo and Subaru that his true wish can only be granted by Kamui. Regaining one of the Sacred Swords, Fuma faces Kamui for the last time as the series goes on hiatus.

=== Other appearances ===
In the 1996 film, Fuma's character is different. When Kamui returns to Tokyo, Fuma follows the Dragons of Earth when they kidnap Kotori. He meets a woman named Kanoe aming to recruit him to the Dragons of Earth. From Kanoe, Fuma learns that he is Kamui's opposite and must face him to destroy humanity, Fuma changes to his evil persona. However, Fuma also kills Kotori and most of the Dragons of the Earth to take his Sacred Sword. Kamui beheads him with his Sacred Sword near the end of the film; he weeps over Fuma's corpse and cradles his severed head, wondering why tragedy had befallen him.

In the anime television series, Fuma becomes Kamui like in the manga but his final actions are different; He recruits Arashi Kishū into the Dragons of Earth to kill Kamui as her lover, Dragon of Heaven Sorata Arisugawa, is destined to die protecting Kamui. In the end, Sorata sacrifices his life to protect Arashi from Fuma and burn burn most of his body. Mortally wounded, Fuma absorbs Nataku's flesh to recover from his wounds. He survives for his match against Kamui, and defeats him. A wounded Kamui sacrifices his life to create barrier which restores his best friend's old personality. In addition to manga and anime, Fuma is a playable character in X: Unmei no Sentaku, a video games based on the series.

An alternate Fuma appears in Tsubasa: Reservoir Chronicle. Fuma is Seishiro's younger brother, a treasure hunter and the leader of the people in Tokyo Tower. He arrived in Tokyo four years earlier with a magic feather from a young girl, Sakura. Fuma often battles Kamui in Tokyo, and they are the region's strongest fighters. He is a friend of the witch Yuko Ichihara, for whom he retrieves items when he travels to other dimensions. Fuma appears in Japan Country to give Sakura's ally, Kurogane, a robotic arm while working for Yūko. Fuma had encountered series protagonist Syaoran, realizing that he had become stronger than Seishiro had trained him; however, the fight's outcome was unknown. He reappears in the spin-off Tsubasa World Chronicle on a mission to deliver a replacement of Kurogane's arm.

== Reception ==
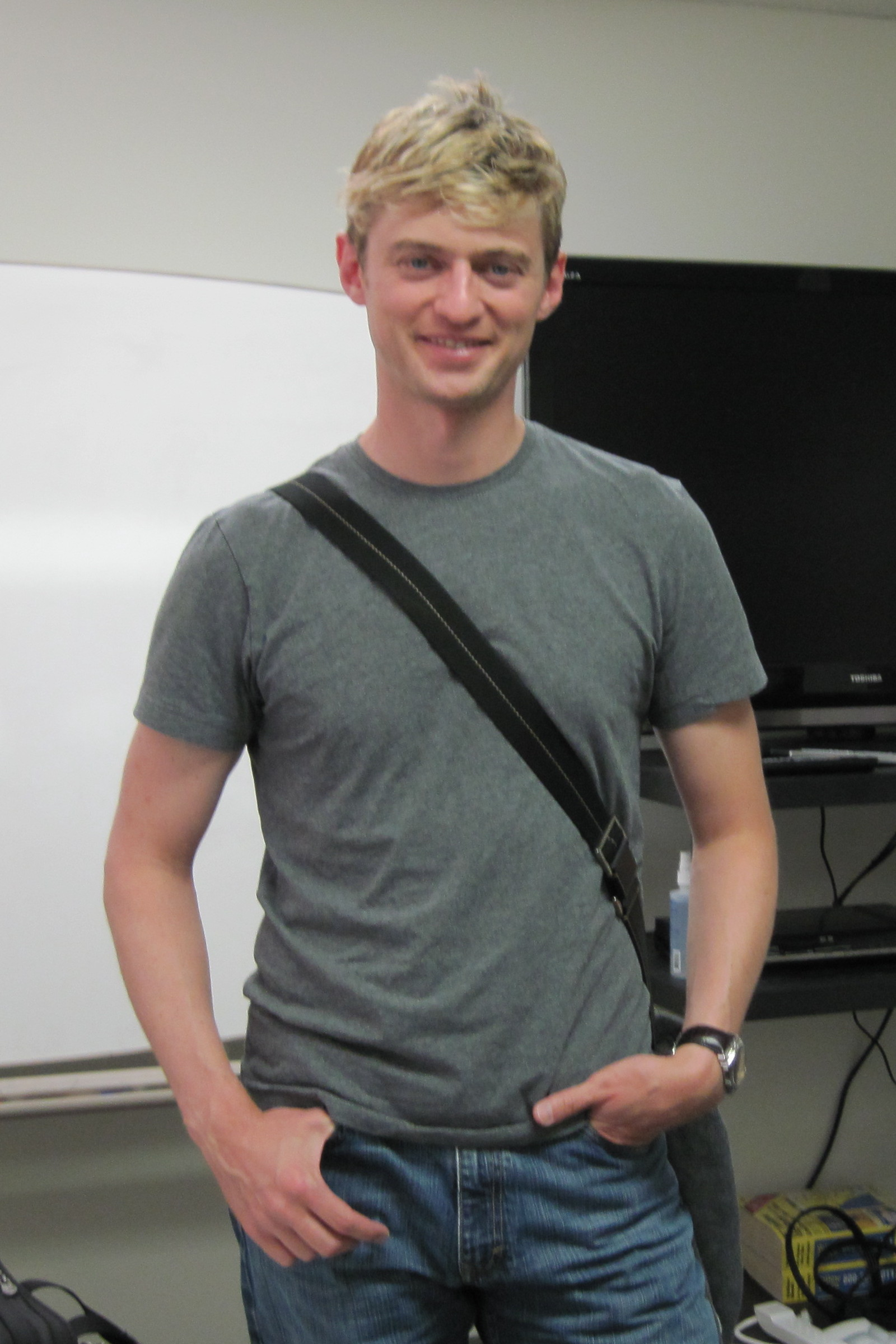
English actor Crispin Freeman's voicing of Fuma was praised.

Critical response to the character has been positive, with Anime News Network's Mike Krandol calling him "creepy". Mike Crandol felt that Fuma had a charm even as an antagonist, most notably when the rest of the series was more appealing. Andy Hanley of UK Anime Network noted that an early scene in the series was a major foreshadowing event which would connect Fuma with Kamui, though initially irrelevant for the enjoyment of the narrative. Compared to the first X film, Zac Bertschy of Anime News Network said that Fuma's transformation into the series' villain is more realistic in the television series. In an overview, Carl Kimlinger agreed about the transformation of Fuma into the villain known as the "Shadow Kamui". About the manga, Shaenon K. Garrity of Anime News Network called Fuma's transformation into the Earth's Kamui one of Clamp's best-written moments in action scenes and shōjo manga in general. Garrity called it a "Badass Moment" and Fuma's inexplicable murder of his sister "unbelievable". Jason Thompson found Fuma's transformation one of Clamp's most famous plot twists, similar to those in RG Veda and Tokyo Babylon. A Manga News reviewer enjoyed the character's interactions with Seishiro as they become friends while causing an earthquake. Crispin Freeman was praised by Anime News Network as one of the best X English voice actors, as appealing as Junichi Suwabe.

Readers of the series have wondered if Clamp was hinting at a romantic relationship between Kamui and Fuma; according to Sequental Art, most of Fuma's interactions with Kamui had homoerotic overtones. In the book Understanding Manga and Anime, Robin E. Brenner said that Clamp had no such intention in a comparison with the more-explicit relationship between Subaru and Seishiro.

In a retrospective of the anime X, Beverdige praised Kamui's and Fuma's relationship; although the rest of the cast is amazing, few would make the audience overlook the conflict between the two main characters. Some critics found their relationship one of the strongest points in Rintaro's 1996 film. Chris Beveridge of Mania Entertainment praised Kamui and Fuma's final fight in the television series, with its "own level of epic sadness and tragedy." Outside the X series, Anime News Network called the handling of the X characters excellent.
