= William Dufris =

American voice actor (1958–2020)

- Born: William Duffy; February 1, 1958; Houlton, Maine, U.S.
- Died: March 24, 2020 (aged 62); South Portland, Maine, U.S.
- Occupation: Voice actor
- Years active: 1978–2020

William Duffy (February 1, 1958 – March 24, 2020) known professionally as William Dufris or Bill Dufris, was an American voice actor and audiobook narrator.

== Career ==
Dufris began his audio career in London, where he appeared in several BBC Radio plays with Kathleen Turner, Sharon Gless, Stockard Channing, and Helena Bonham-Carter. Moreover, he worked with director Dirk Maggs on his audio drama productions of Spider-Man (where he voiced the title role of Spider-Man/Peter Parker), Judge Dredd, Voyage and An American Werewolf in London.

These experiences led Dufris to co-found the audio production company The Story Circle, Ltd in the UK. Upon returning to the United States, Dufris founded Mind's Eye Productions and co-founded Rocky Coast Radio Theatre and The AudioComics Company, for which he has been producer, director, actor, and engineer. For AudioComics he directed Starstruck, the first season of Horrorscopes, Titanium Rain, Honey West, and The Batson's for the AudioComics Kids line. He also directed Arigon Starr’s audio comedy Super Indian for Native Voices at the Autry in Los Angeles.

He was best known for voicing the title character Bob and other characters like Farmer Pickles, Mr. Beasley and Mr. Sabatini in the American English dub of the British children's animated series Bob the Builder until its ninth season. Dufris also voiced Elvis and Dougan in the stop motion TV series Rocky and the Dodos for Cosgrove Hall and dubbed several anime films such as X, Appleseed and two of the Lupin III films. He is also well known for his narration of the Pendragon books, written by D.J. McHale.

Dufris was on the Advisory Board of the National Audio Theatre Festivals, Inc. in addition to being a Norman Corwin Award Committee member. He was a guest instructor and performer at the 2005–2007 Audio Theatre Workshops, appearing in the world premiere works The Best Place to Grow Pumpkins, Rewind, Extra-Ordinary, and Histories.

In 2018, Dufris and Jack Bowman co-founded the audiobook company Dagaz Media.

Dufris died of esophageal cancer at his home in South Portland on March 24, 2020, at the age of 62.

== Awards ==
Dufris was nominated twelve times as an audiobook finalist for the Audio Publishers Association's Audie Awards, winning in 2012 for Best Non-Fiction. He also garnered 24 Golden Earphones Awards through AudioFile Magazine, and was named by AudioFile as "one of the best voices at the end of the century." Publishers Weekly called his performance of Neal Stephenson's novel Anathem "a delight for the ears".

== Partial list of works ==
=== As voice actor ===
- Angel Cop
- Appleseed
- Bob the Builder – Bob, Farmer Pickles, Mr. Beasley, Mr. Sabatini, & Skip (US dub)
- Judge
- Lupin III (The Secret of Mamo and Goodbye Lady Liberty) - Arsène Lupin III
- New Dominion Tank Police
- Patlabor: The Movie
- Patlabor 2: The Movie
- Rocky and the Dodos – Elvis, Dougan
- X
- Venus Wars

=== As audiobook reader ===
Playaway reader

- Humphrey Audio Collection Books 8-11

==== Tantor Media ====
- Destroyermen series: Into the Storm, Crusade, Maelstrom, Distant Thunders, Rising Tides, Firestorm, Iron Gray Sea and 7 more books in the series until the 15th and final book, "Winds of Wrath", had to be narrated by P.J. Ochlan because of Dufris' death.
- The Enduring Flame series: The Phoenix Unchained, The Phoenix Endangered, The Phoenix Transformed
- Holmes on the Range series: Holmes on the Range, On the Wrong Track, The Black Dove, The Crack in the Lens, World's Greatest Sleuth!
- The Imager Portfolio series: Imager, Imager's Challenge, Imager's Intrigue, Scholar, Princeps, Imager's Battalion, Antiagon Fire, Rex Regis, Madness in Solidar, Treachery's Tools, Assassin's Price, Endgames
- Isaac Asimov's Robot series: The Caves of Steel, The Naked Sun, The Robots of Dawn;
- A Connecticut Yankee in King Arthur's Court
- The Adventures of Huckleberry Finn
- The Adventures of Tom Sawyer
- All Other Nights
- Ask a Mexican
- Books
- The California Roll
- The Call
- Chariots of the Gods
- The Christmas Chronicles
- Company
- Containment
- Controlled Burn
- Dali & I
- Digging for the Truth
- The Disagreement
- The Dream of Perpetual Motion
- The Duel and Other Stories
- The End of Food
- Fever
- Fieldwork
- Fletch Won
- Flying Through Midnight
- Frozen
- The Futurist
- Golf My Own Damn Way
- The Good Psychologist
- Haze
- Herland
- Holy Water
- I'm Dying Up Here
- Ignore Everybody
- Ilustrado
- Johnny Got His Gun
- Killing Che
- The Last Days of Krypton
- Lord Vishnu's Love Handles
- Mad Dogs
- The Man with the Iron Heart
- The Many Deaths of the Firefly Brothers
- Me and a Guy Named Elvis
- Odyssey of the Gods
- Pandora's Legion
- Percival's Planet
- The Red Badge of Courage
- Replay
- Saint Patrick's Battalion
- The Shadowkiller
- The Sheriff of Yrnameer
- Snark
- Soul Catcher
- Stick to Drawing Comics, Monkey Brain!
- The Third Brother
- Time Bandit
- The Way to Win
- White Flag Down
- White Shadow
- The World to Come
- You Call the Shots

==== Other titles ====
- Adventures of Huckleberry Finn by Mark Twain
- A Journey With Strange Bedfellows by Jan C J Jones
- Anathem by Neal Stephenson
- Cryptonomicon by Neal Stephenson
- The Ethical Assassin
- Shadowland
- The Pendragon Adventure series
- Flappers and Philosophers by F. Scott Fitzgerald
- Danse Macabre by Stephen King
- Woken Furies by Richard K. Morgan
- Replay by Ken Grimwood
- Old Man's War by John Scalzi
- Awaken Your Strongest Self by Neil Fiore
- The Maltese Falcon by Dashiell Hammett
