= USS Walker (DD-517) =

Fletcher-class destroyer

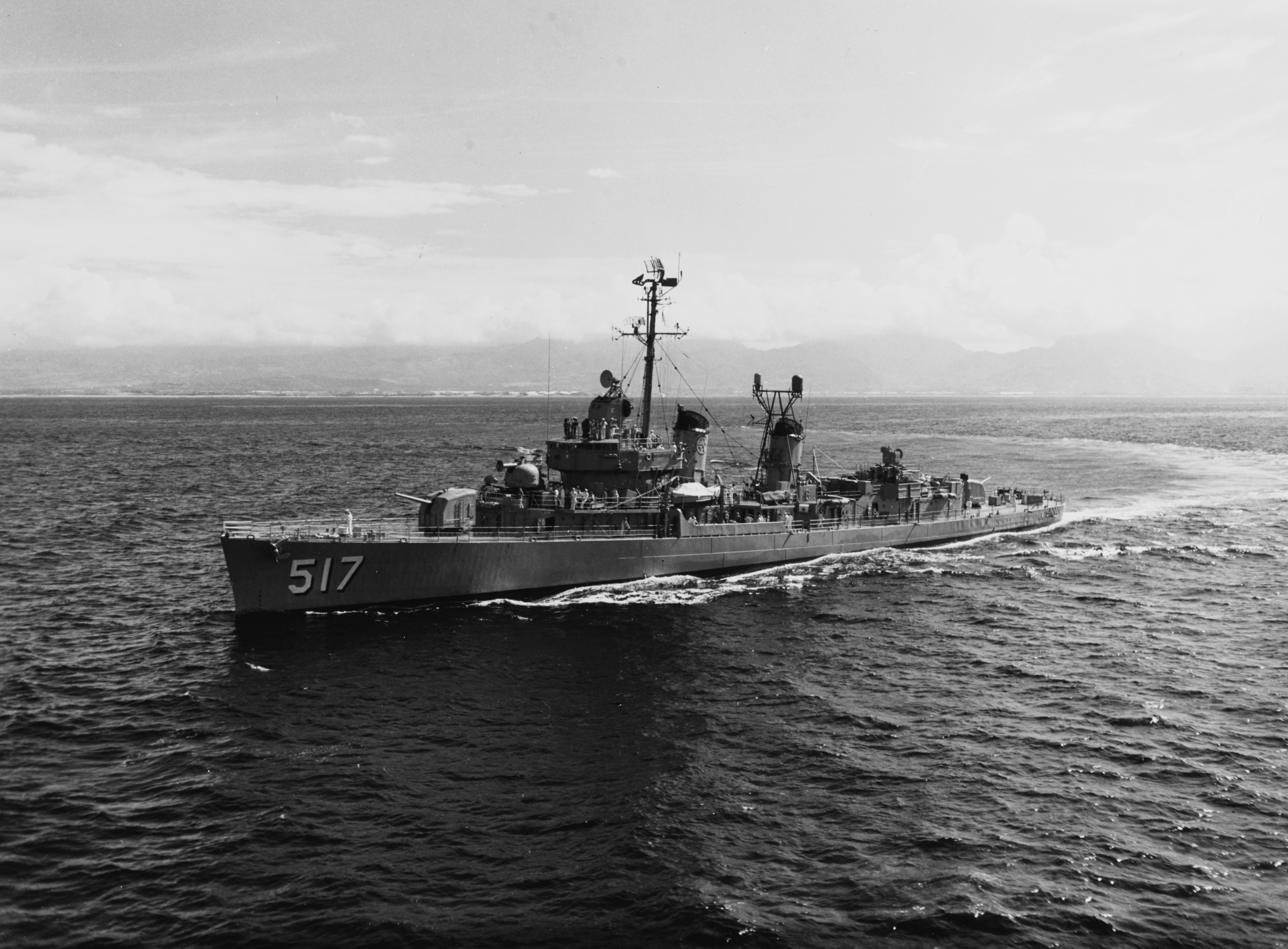
- USS Walker (DD-517), 1963

History

United States
- Namesake: John Grimes Walker
- Builder: Bath Iron Works
- Laid down: 31 August 1942
- Launched: 31 January 1943
- Commissioned: 3 April 1943
- Decommissioned: 2 July 1969
- Stricken: 2 July 1969
- Fate: Sold to Italy, 2 July 1969

History

Italy
- Name: Fante (D 561)
- Acquired: 2 July 1969
- Stricken: 1977
- Fate: Scrapped, 1977

General characteristics
- Class & type: Fletcher-class destroyer
- Displacement: 2,050 tons
- Length: 376 ft 6 in (114.7 m)
- Beam: 39 ft 8 in (12.1 m)
- Draft: 17 ft 9 in (5.4 m)
- Propulsion: 60,000 shp (45 MW); 2 propellers
- Speed: 35 knots (65 km/h; 40 mph)
- Range: 6500 nmi. (12,000 km) at 15 kt
- Complement: 336
- Armament: 5 × single Mk 12 5 in (127 mm)/38 guns; 5 × twin 40 mm (1.6 in) Bofors AA guns; 7 × single 20 mm (0.8 in) Oerlikon AA guns; 2 × quintuple 21 in (533 mm) torpedo tubes; 6 × single depth charge throwers; 2 × depth charge racks

USS Walker (DD-517), a Fletcher-class destroyer, was the second ship of the United States Navy to be named for Admiral John Grimes Walker (1835–1907).

Walker was laid down on 31 August 1942 by the Bath Iron Works Corp., Bath, Maine; launched on 31 January 1943, sponsored by Miss Sarah C. Walker; and commissioned on 3 April 1943.

The first seven months of Walker's service took place in the Atlantic where she was engaged in Caribbean escort duty and training exercises in preparation for Pacific combat duty. The highlights of this period included the capture on 7 August of 43 survivors of the U-615 which had been damaged by Navy air units off Cuba, and the responsibility of escorting the Secretary of State, Cordell Hull, from San Juan, Puerto Rico, to Casablanca to participate in the Moscow Conference of October 1943.

== 1944 ==
Walker transited the Panama Canal on 1 November 1943 and proceeded to join the forces engaged in the conquest of Tarawa. After a month of operations in that area, the destroyer took part in the Marshall Islands campaign from 29 January through 8 February 1944. She joined forces at Funafuti for the invasion of Kwajalein; and, as part of a heavy cruiser bombardment unit, she participated in numerous neutralization bombardments at Wotje and Taroa. The only Japanese resistance encountered came from shore batteries which failed to hit their mark.

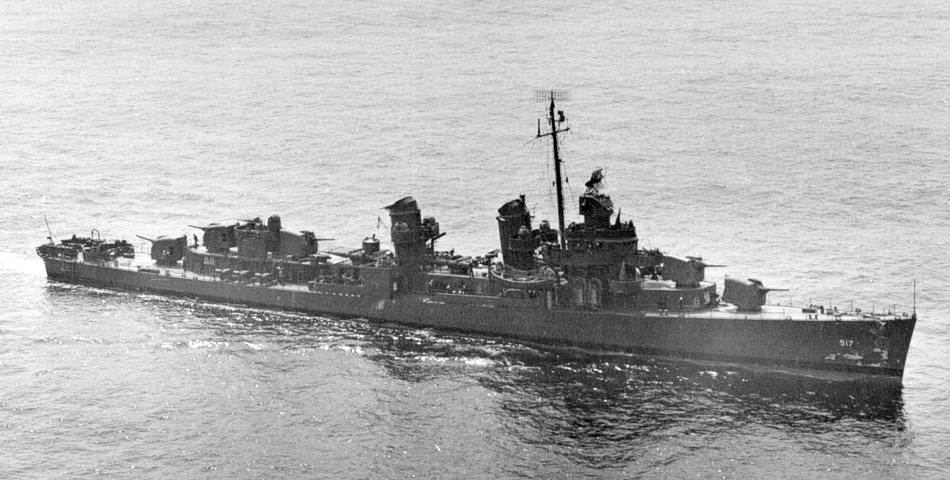
Walker in 1943.

From March through June 1944, Walker operated in the South Pacific escorting troops and transports from Guadalcanal to Bougainville and from various points in New Guinea. Other ports visited during this period were Purvis Bay, Tulagi; Empress Augusta Bay, Bougainville; Milne Bay and Buna, New Guinea.

The Marianas operation involved the invasion of Saipan, Tinian, and Guam by forces under Admiral Raymond A. Spruance. Walker began service assigned to an escort carrier unit providing air support for the amphibious forces headed for Guam. The group departed from Kwajalein in June; but, due to the bitterness of the campaign for Saipan, the Guam landings were postponed, and the ships returned to Eniwetok. After the need for further naval support had passed, Walker proceeded to Pearl Harbor for rehearsals of scheduled landings on Yap Island.

Leaving Pearl Harbor in September, Walker was transferred to the 7th Fleet as a fire support ship for the invasion of the Philippines. This group of transports and destroyers sailed from Manus and arrived at Leyte Gulf on 20 October. During this operation, Walker experienced her first air action and downed one enemy fighter plane as well as provided gunfire support in the Dulag area. The transports were rapidly unloaded and departed with Walker and other escorts prior to the arrival of the Japanese naval forces and the ensuing Battle of Leyte Gulf from 24 to 25 October 1944.

The group proceeded to Morotai to reload support troops for Leyte. At Morotai, nightly Japanese air attacks harassed the ships but caused little damage. The group then returned to Leyte and unloaded its troops. Suicide air attacks and torpedo bombers were encountered during this trip, but no damage was suffered. After a brief stop at Palau, Walker received orders to return home, and she reached the Mare Island Navy Yard, San Francisco, California, on Christmas Eve 1944.

== 1945 ==
The most memorable part of Walker's combat service began in mid-March 1945 when, fresh from navy yard overhaul, she joined Admiral Marc Mitscher's famed Task Force 58 (TF 58) at Ulithi, Caroline Islands. This force proceeded to Kyūshū and Honshū, Japan, for air strikes designed to neutralize and weaken Japanese air power.

Following these strikes, TF 58 proceeded to Okinawa to support the amphibious assault launched there on 1 April 1945. While alone on picket duty 12 miles from the main group, Walker was subjected to persistent Japanese kamikaze attacks. One plane dropped a torpedo just after dark which passed close astern. During that night, Walker's agile maneuvers and accurate guns beat off three more such attacks. On 7 April 1945, Paul Klahr, Gun Captain of 40 mm Gun 43 (starboard midship position), vividly recalls that a Zeke fighter circled the stern and began diving for the bridge from the starboard side of the Walker. The Zeke passed forward of Klahr's gun position by about 20 feet allowing him and his crew to see the face of the pilot. He remembers the pilot's look of fear, facing his impending death. One member of his gun crew actually threw his helmet at the plane as it passed. The plane flew over the ship between the positions of the five inch guns Gun 1 and Gun 2 at an altitude low enough to part the lifelines on the port side before wheeling into the ocean and exploding, sending a solid sheet of water over the Walker mixed with debris from the plane and the shredded remains of its pilot.

After 80 days at sea, the task group returned to port. During this period, Walker towed Haggard to Kerama Retto near Okinawa after she had been damaged by kamikaze hits.

The destroyer continued operations through July and August with the 3d Fleet and encountered no Japanese air opposition. Walker was among the ships which bombarded Kamaishi, Honshū, Japan, on 18 July and made a similar attack at Hammahatsu and a return trip to Kamaishi. The coming of peace resulted in Walker entering Tokyo after a period of air-rescue duty during the airborne phase of the occupation.

On 1 November 1945, Walker arrived from the forward area at San Pedro, California; and, on 31 May 1946, she was placed out of commission, in reserve, at San Diego.

== 1950 – 1963 ==
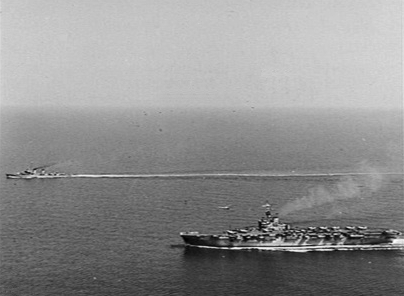
Walker escorting HMAS Sydney (R17) off Korea, in 1951.

The ship remained in "mothballs" until 15 September 1950 when she was recommissioned and converted to an escort destroyer. From the time of her recommissioning until 27 February 1951, Walker remained in yard overhaul.

Following a shakedown cruise, the escort destroyer departed San Diego and participated in the atomic Exercise Greenhouse at Eniwetok until June 1951. The next month, the ship joined the newly formed Escort Destroyer Squadron 1 based at Pearl Harbor, Hawaii. She remained in Hawaii until November 1951 when she sailed for the western Pacific and joined the United Nations Blockading Force assisting UN ground troops in the Korean War. She escorted the fast carrier task forces which were supporting ground units with strategic air strikes. Thus ended Walker's Korean War service.

Walker returned to Pearl Harbor during March 1952 and conducted type training and routine exercises for the next several months. On 2 June, the escort destroyer sailed for her second western Pacific deployment. From that time until 29 December 1963, Walker completed nine such deployments. These very active years were spent, for the most part, conducting antisubmarine warfare exercises and various operations with her task group and elements of the Republic of Korea Navy and the Japanese Maritime Self-Defense Force. Walker's many "People to People" visits during this period helped to spread American good will abroad. Highlights of these years included assistance to the town of Koniya, Amami Ōshima, which had suffered major damage from a raging fire in September 1958 and as a recovery ship for a Project Mercury space flight on 28 September 1962.

== 1964 – 1965 ==
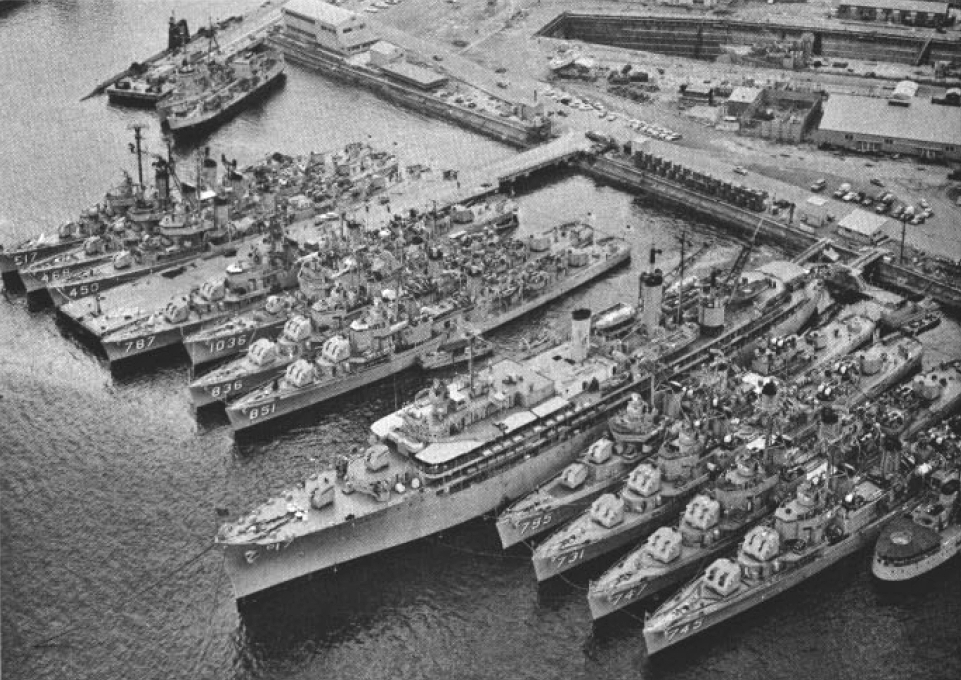
Walker at Yokosuka, circa 1960.

On 4 January 1964, Walker commenced a two-week tender availability at Pearl Harbor with Bryce Canyon. On 31 January, the ship officially entered the Pearl Harbor Naval Shipyard for overhaul. The completion of yard overhaul on 30 April marked the commencement of local exercises in preparation for refresher training. On 19 May, Walker took part in the filming of the movie None But The Brave at the island of Kauai. After a month of refresher training and an administrative inspection, the escort destroyer underwent upkeep which took her through June.

The summer months found Walker engaged in local operations. On 17 August 1964, the ship continued her movie career with a supporting role in Otto Preminger's production of In Harm's Way. During October and November, the escort destroyer underwent a pre-employment inspection and an operational readiness inspection which was concluded on 20 November, three days prior to departure for a western Pacific deployment.

On December 3rd 1964, Walker arrived at Yokosuka, Japan, where she joined in Exercise Tall Back with the aircraft carrier Yorktown, followed by duties on the Junk patrol which combatted the infiltration of arms into South Vietnam from North Vietnam and the People's Republic of China. During this period, the escort destroyer performed a month of duty on the Taiwan patrol.

Walker participated in an artistic photo of Task Force 77 in 1965. Walker departed Vietnam waters on 27 April 1965 and, after a brief stop at Yokosuka, Japan, arrived at Pearl Harbor on 13 May. The remainder of May and June was spent in leave and upkeep. The escort destroyer spent the rest of the year in local operations. On 8 December, Walker was drydocked and spent the holiday season in leave and upkeep.

== 1966 ==
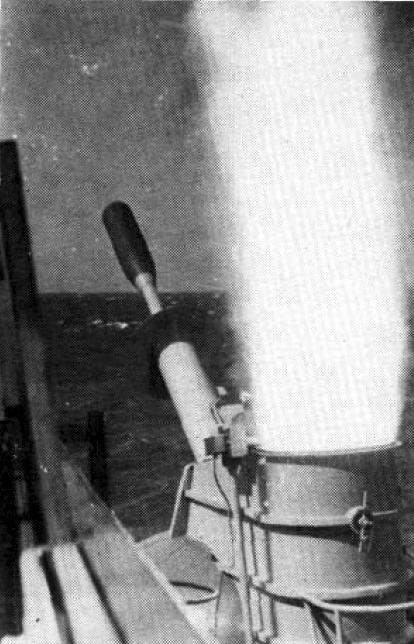
Weapon Alpha launch by Walker, circa 1958.

January 1966 saw the ship taking part in local operations and making preparations for an upcoming deployment. On 7 February, she commenced a six-month cruise, arriving at Yokosuka via Midway Atoll 10 days later. Duty in the South China Sea began on 28 February with assignments as a planeguard and as a naval gunfire support ship. Walker's first offensive actions of the Vietnam War occurred on 5 March in support of United States and Allied forces. This assignment was interrupted by patrol duty in the Taiwan Strait and rest and rehabilitation at Keelung, Taiwan; and Hong Kong.

Walker returned to Qui Nhơn, South Vietnam, on 22 April and began support missions, shooting direct fire at the Vietcong coastal supply areas and troop concentrations. The second ship on station, Walker received sporadic machine gunfire from the enemy ashore while a gig was returning with spotters and advisors to the ship for a briefing. This was the first time since World War II that Walker had been subjected to hostile fire.

On 26 April 1966, the escort destroyer supplied direct, indirect, harassment, and interdiction support for Operation Osage, a combined amphibious assault at Chu Lai. These duties were interrupted to escort a Marine Corps motor convoy from Da Nang to Phu Bai on 28 April. On 1 May, the ship detached and proceeded independently for repairs at Sasebo, Japan, via Buckner Bay, Okinawa.

Walker set course on 17 May for Manila Bay, Philippines, where she joined in SEATO antisubmarine warfare Exercise Sea Imp which lasted until 6 June. The ship next joined Taylor for a month of patrol duty in the Taiwan Strait during which time she rescued a Nationalist Chinese fishing boat adrift for 48 hours. The escort destroyer returned to Yokosuka, Japan, on 8 July.

Instead of departing for home, Walker received orders to replace Walke in antisubmarine exercises in the Sea of Japan. These exercises included the Japan Maritime Self-Defense Force and naval units of the Republic of Korea. On 24 July, a Soviet Kotlin-class destroyer was sighted as it commenced shadowing the Allied group. Walker was designated to shoulder the Russian destroyer, and she was successful in preventing the attempted penetration of the screen by the Russian ship and her replacement. Walker also assumed duty on 29 July as a shadow against the Soviet electronics intelligence (Elint) trawler Izmeritel.

On 1 August 1966, Walker detached and proceeded to Yokosuka from whence she began the transit to Hawaii. She arrived at Pearl Harbor on 10 August and made preparations for a yard overhaul. Walker entered the Pearl Harbor Naval Shipyard on 19 September and remained in overhaul status for the rest of calendar year 1966.

== 1967 ==
Regular overhaul was completed on 3 February 1967, and type training exercises, refresher training, and an operational readiness evaluation followed. On 18 April, Walker departed Pearl Harbor en route to Japan. From 4 to 17 May, the task group embarked on a transit of the Sea of Japan to demonstrate antisubmarine and antiair capabilities with the Japanese Maritime Self-Defense Force.

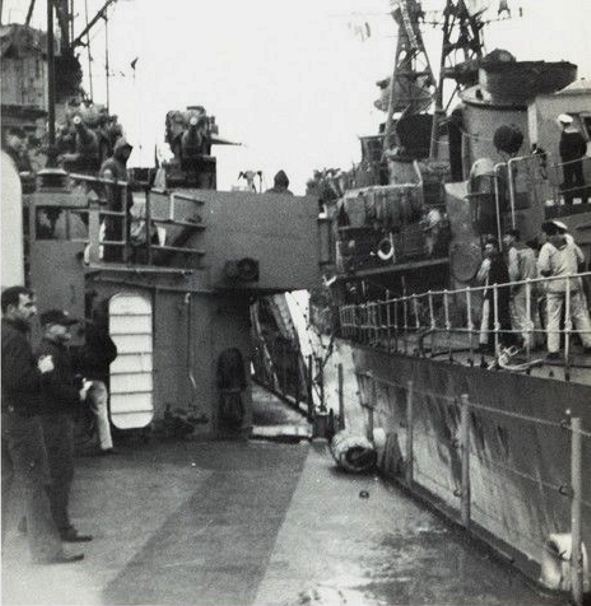
The Soviet destroyer Besslednyy collides with Walker, 10 May 1967.

On 10 May 1967, Walker relieved Taylor of screening duty for Hornet from the Soviet destroyer Besslednyy (022) which was attempting to close Hornet and harass the task group. A collision occurred between the two ships with minor damage sustained by both ships. The next day, Walker was again involved in screening duties with a Soviet ship. Late in the afternoon, a Soviet Spokoynyy class (projects 56) destroyer Veskiy began to maneuver in an attempt to close Hornet; Walker effectively maneuvered the ship away. The Soviet destroyer than signaled a left turn. Walker signaled "do not cross ahead of me." The Soviet ship came left and collided with Walker causing minor damage to both ships. Following exercises with the Republic of Korea Navy, Walker returned to Sasebo, Japan, and held a news conference and interviews on board concerning the Sea of Japan incidents.

The escort destroyer arrived at the Gulf of Tonkin on 25 May 1967. Walker served in several capacities: providing call fire, harassment, and interdiction fire for airborne spotters; acting as a rescue destroyer for Hornet, Bon Homme Richard and Constellation; and firing around-the-clock missions for numerous Army and Marine units.

On the evening of 15 July, while providing gunfire support south of Cape Batangan, Walker received notification that a North Vietnamese naval trawler (459) carrying arms was expected to attempt a landing in the vicinity. Walker provided gunfire support for the attack on the trawler and suppressed enemy fire from the beach. The trawler was beached by the crew and abandoned with large quantities of arms, ammunition, and demolition equipment recovered by American forces.

Walker joined Operation Beacon Guide as a naval gunfire support ship on 20 July and provided preparation fire for the amphibious and helicopter assault south of Huế. After a brief tender availability at Taiwan, Walker returned to the Tonkin Gulf on 9 August and operated with Intrepid (CVS-11) for a week prior to departure for Hong Kong.

The escort destroyer rejoined Hornet, and the task group arrived at Hong Kong on 16 August, then transited to Sasebo, Japan, for repairs. Walker returned to the Gulf of Tonkin on 7 September and was detached three days later to proceed to the Paracel Islands in the South China Sea and conduct surveillance and gather intelligence data about the Chinese communist-held islands.

Upon her return to the waters off Vietnam, Walker reported to Coral Sea for duty as her escort and spent the majority of September in various antisubmarine warfare exercises. On 27 September, Walker rejoined Hornet and rescued four survivors of an aircraft which had plunged into the water after losing an engine during launch.

On 1 October 1967, the escort destroyer returned to antisubmarine warfare (ASW) exercises, then headed for upkeep at Yokosuka prior to preceding to the eastern Pacific. Walker arrived at Pearl Harbor on 23 October and spent a month in post-deployment leave, type training, and a reserve cruise. Holiday leave commenced on 15 December.

== 1968 ==
Walker spent the first seven months of 1968 in her home port conducting type training and preparing for a final western Pacific deployment. On 5 August, the escort destroyer got underway on the fourth western Pacific deployment since the beginning of the Vietnam War. She arrived at Subic Bay, Philippines, via Midway Atoll and Guam on 18 August, then proceeded to Vietnam.

Planeguard duty with America was Walker's first assignment. During her first night on station, she rescued a man overboard from America. On 13 November, Walker was relieved and proceeded to Subic Bay for upkeep. On 1 December, the escort destroyer arrived at the area north of Vũng Tàu for gunline duty which ended on 15 December.

After a fuel stop at Subic Bay, Walker continued to Cebu, Philippines, arriving on 18 December as part of Operation Handclasp. The ship returned to Subic Bay on 22 December for a five-day tender availability alongside Samuel Gompers. On 29 December, Walker returned to Vietnam for a week of planeguard duty with Constellation (CVA-64).

== 1969 ==
On 5 January 1969, the escort destroyer departed for visits to Hong Kong and Subic Bay. The ship joined three other destroyers and sailed for Australia and New Zealand. Walker and Taylor visited Wollongong and Melbourne, Australia; and Auckland, New Zealand, before arriving back at Pearl Harbor on 28 February. March was spent in leave; and, at the end of the month, Walker received word that she would be decommissioned.

May was spent in port at Pearl Harbor; but, on 2 June, Walker got underway for San Diego, the designated decommissioning site. On 2 July 1969, Walker was decommissioned and stricken from the Navy List.

== Fante (D 561) ==
The ship was sold to Italy, where she was renamed Fante (D 561). Fante was retired from Italian Navy service in 1977, and broken up for scrap.

== Honors ==
Walker earned six battle stars for World War II engagements, two for Korean War, and three for Vietnam War service.

== See also ==
See USS Walker for other ships of the same name.
