= John G. Walker =

John G. Walker may refer to:

- John George Walker (1821 - 1893), Confederate general in the American Civil War
- John Grimes Walker (1835 - 1907), United States Navy admiral
