= USS Walker =

Two ships of the United States Navy have borne the name USS Walker, in honor of Admiral John Grimes Walker (1835–1907), who served during the American Civil War.

- The first, USS Walker (DD-163), was a Wickes-class destroyer, launched in 1918 and struck in 1942.
- The second, USS Walker (DD-517), was a Fletcher-class destroyer, launched in 1943 and struck in 1969. Sold to the Italian Navy, she was renamed Fante (D-516), and served until 1977.
