= Henry L. Howison =

American naval officer

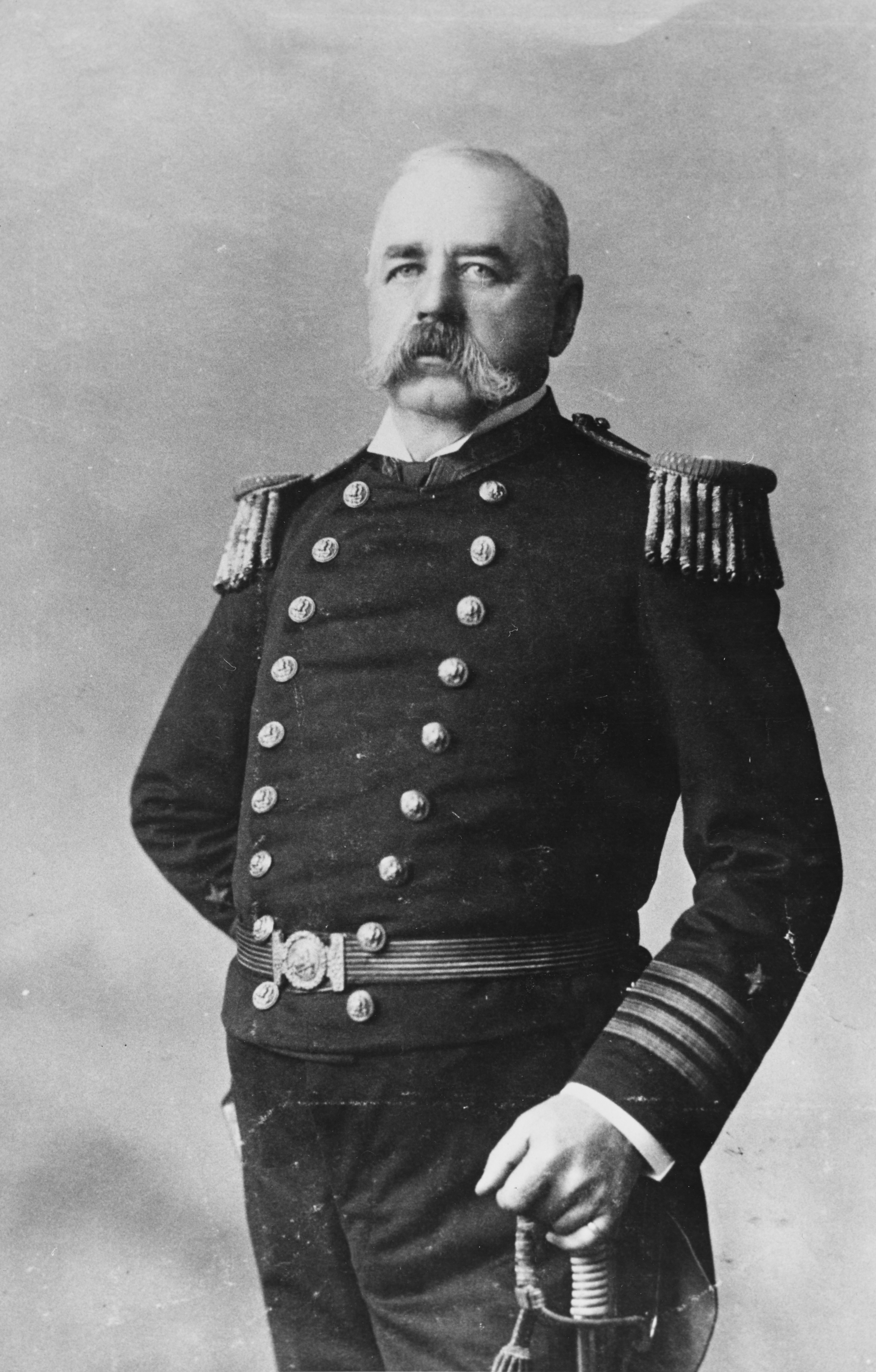
- Henry L. Howison (c. 1880s–1890s)
- Born: Henry Lycurgus Howison; October 10, 1837; Washington, D.C., U.S.
- Died: December 31, 1914 (aged 77); Yonkers, New York, U.S.
- Burial place: Oak Hill Cemetery; Washington, D.C., U.S.
- Education: United States Naval Academy
- Spouse: Hannah J. Middleton (m. 1865)
- Military career
- Branch: United States Navy; Union Navy
- Service years: 1858–1899
- Rank: Rear Admiral
- Commands: USS Bienville; USS Pensacola; USS Shawmut; USS Vandalia; Mare Island Navy Yard; USS Oregon; Boston Navy Yard; South Atlantic Station; USS Chicago
- Conflicts: American Civil War; Battle of Fort Sumter; Battle of Port Royal; Battle of Fort Wagner; Battle of Mobile Bay

Signature
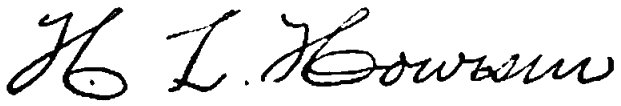

Henry Lycurgus Howison (October 10, 1837 – December 31, 1914) was a rear admiral in the United States Navy. He was an officer in the Union Navy throughout the American Civil War, participating in the Battle of Port Royal and Battle of Mobile Bay. He later served as professor and department head at the United States Naval Academy.

== Early life ==
Henry Lycurgus Howison was born on October 10, 1837, in Washington, D.C., to Juliet Virginia (née Jackson) and Henry Howison. He then lived in Indiana and was recommended for the United States Naval Academy. Howison entered the Naval Academy on September 26, 1854, as acting midshipman and graduated on June 11, 1858.

== Career ==
Howison left on the USS Saratoga on June 17, 1858, to Key West, Florida. He then served the next three years on the steam frigate USS Wabash, the gunship USS Pocahontas and the steam sloop USS Pawnee. He was promoted on January 19, 1861, as a "passed midshipman". He was subsequently promoted to master in February 1861 and as lieutenant in April 1861. In April 1861, he was present at the surrender of General Anderson at the Battle of Fort Sumter. He was sent on a special assignment to Cloud's Mill, Virginia and was involved in a skirmish with General Stuart's cavalry. He took part in the capture of Port Royal alongside Andrew E. K. Benham. He was the executive officer of three South Atlantic Blockading Squadron ships: steamer USS Augusta, monitor USS Nantucket and USS Catskill. Howison took part in the bombardments of Forts Moultrie, Sumter and Wagner. He then took command of the USS Bienville in the Gulf of Mexico and participated in the Battle of Mobile Bay. In March 1865, Howison was appointed lieutenant commander. Howison worked in ordnance inspection duty in the Washington Navy Yard for one year. He then worked on steamer USS Pensacola on the Pacific Station as a navigator and executive officer.

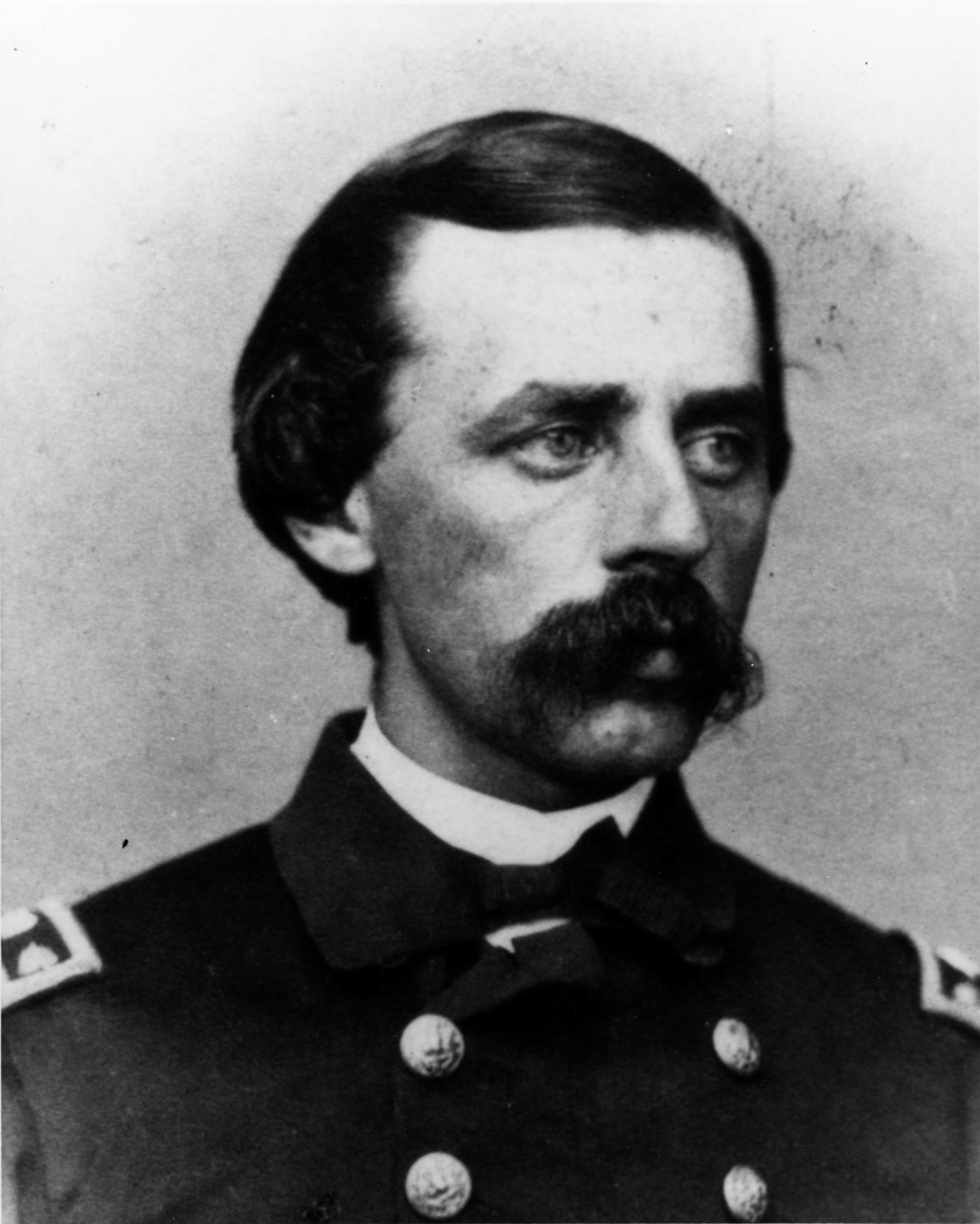
Lieutenant Commander Howison c. 1865–1872

From 1868 to 1872, Howison rejoined the Washington Navy Yard and then the U.S. Naval Academy. From 1870 to 1872, he was in charge of all vessels at the Naval Academy and was senior instructor aboard the stationary school ship USS Constitution. Howison was promoted to commander and commanded the gunboat USS Shawmut from 1873 to 1875. He then returned to the Naval Academy. He served as head of the Department of Seamanship from 1875 to 1878. From 1878 to 1881, he was Inspector of Ordnance. He worked at the Naval Academy until the 1880s. He was promoted to captain. In 1881, he became a member of the first advisory board of the Navy. In 1886, Howison commanded the screw sloop USS Vandalia. In 1888, Howison was appointed as president of the Steel Inspecting Board. From 1890 to 1892, Howison served in the Lighthouse Board. He then served as captain of the Mare Island Navy Yard from 1892 to 1893 and commander of Mare Island Navy Yard from 1893 to 1896. In 1896, Howison took command of the new battleship USS Oregon. From May 1897 to March 1899, Howison served as commandant of the Boston Navy Yard. He was promoted to rear admiral in September 1898. In March 1899, Howison became commander of South Atlantic Station aboard the USS Chicago and served in that role until he retired on October 10, 1899.

In September 1901, Howison was added to a Court of Inquiry on the conduct of Commodore Winfield Scott Schley during the Spanish–American War. He was removed from the proceedings due to previous statements made against Schley's conduct.

== Personal life ==
Howison married Hannah J. Middleton on October 3, 1865.

In December 1914, Howison received an operation for intestinal obstruction at St. John's Riverside Hospital. Three weeks later, Howison died at his home, 53 Locust Hill Street in Yonkers, New York, on December 31, 1914. He was interred at Oak Hill Cemetery in Washington, D.C.
