= Taylor Anderson (author) =

American alternate history science fiction author

- Citizenship: American
- Education: Tarleton State University (BA, MA)
- Occupation: Novelist
- Writing career
- Period: 2008–present
- Genre: Science fiction
- Notable work: Destroyermen series
- Website: www.taylorandersonauthor.com

Taylor Anderson is an author, historical artillery and firearm expert, re-enactor, and former history professor. He is the author of the Destroyermen series, about USS Walker, USS Mahan, and USS S-19, and their fight against the Grik. Anderson has also written several short stories in the same fictional universe.

Anderson served as a weapons consultant to various media organizations. In 1999, he owned three cannons which he had used for Civil War re-enactments and manufactured 19th century firearms. He served as a weapons expert for the 2004 movie The Alamo.

In May 2020, Anderson announced that Winds of Wrath would be the final book in the Destroyermen series and that he has started on a new writing project. The first book of his Artillerymen series, a prequel to Destroyermen, was released in September 2021.

== Education ==
Anderson received a bachelor of arts and master of arts in history from Tarleton State University. He taught American history for one academic year at Tarleton from 1991 to 1992.

== Bibliography ==
=== Destroyermen ===
Destroyermen is a series of 15 novels and 2 short stories, written from 2008 to 2020, telling the saga of the men of two United States Wickes-class destroyers that gets transported in March 1942 to an alternate Earth in which dinosaurs evolved into a dominant sentient life form.

Novels

No.	Title	Publication date	Hardcover ISBN	Mass market paperback ISBN
1	Into the Storm	June 2008	978-0451462077	978-0451462374
2	Crusade	October 2008	978-0451462305	978-0451462572
3	Maelstrom	February 2009	978-0451462534	978-0451462824
4	Distant Thunders	June 2010	978-0451463333	978-0451463708
5	Rising Tides	February 2011	978-0451463883	978-0451464064
6	Firestorm	October 2011	978-0451464170	978-0451464385
7	Iron Gray Sea	July 2012	978-0451464545	978-0451414236
8	Storm Surge	July 2013	978-0451465139	978-0451419095
9	Deadly Shores	May 2014	978-0451465665	978-0451468352
10	Straits of Hell	May 2015	978-0451470614	978-0451470621
11	Blood in the Water	June 2016	978-0451470638	978-0451470645
12	Devil’s Due	June 2017	978-0451470652	978-0451470669
13	River of Bones	July 2018	978-0399587504	978-0399587528
14	Pass of Fire	June 2019	978-0399587535	978-0399587559
15	Winds of Wrath	June 2020	978-0399587566	978-0399587580

Short stories

- "Through the Squall" in the anthology To Slip the Surly Bonds (The Phases of Mars series) (September 2019) by Chris Kennedy and James Young, ISBN 978-1950420513
- "An Orderly Withdrawal" in the anthology Trouble in the Wind (The Phases of Mars series) (December 2019) by Chris Kennedy and James Young, ISBN 978-1950420759

=== Artillerymen ===
Artillerymen is a series that Anderson began writing in 2021 which tells the story of a group of unassigned American replacement soldiers who were traveling on several chartered transport ships in 1847 bound for Veracruz to reinforce U.S. General Winfield Scott's army in his march inland to capture Mexico City during the Mexican-American War when their ships was mysteriously transported to the same alternate Earth as the Destroyermen, but a century before the Destroyermen's arrival. These people became the founders of the New United States (NUS) mentioned in the Destroyermen series.

Novels

No.	Title	Publication date	Hard cover ISBN	Mass market paperback ISBN
1	Purgatory's Shore	September 2021	978-0593200711	978-0593200728
2	Hell's March	September 2022	978-0593200742	978-0593200759
3	Devil's Battle	September 2023	978-0593200773	978-0593200780
4	Inferno's Shadow	July 2025	978-0593641576	TBA

== Reception and literary significance ==
Several of his books sold well enough to be included on various best selling book lists. Firestorm was listed on the New York Times Best Seller list for hardcover fiction for one week in October 2011 and Iron Gray Sea was listed on the New York Times Best Seller list for hardcover fiction for one week in July 2012. Iron Gray Sea was listed on the USA Today Best-Selling Books list during a single week in July 2012.

Several of his books were finalist for a number of major literary awards. Into the Storm was a finalist for the 2009 Compton Crook Award. Blood in the Water was a finalist for the 2016 Dragon Award for Best Military Science Fiction or Fantasy Novel and Devil’s Battle was a finalist for the 2024 Dragon Award for Best Alternate History Novel.

=== Critical studies and reviews of Anderson's work ===
Straits of Hell

- Sakers, Don (November 2015). "The Reference Library". Analog Science Fiction and Fact. 135 (11): 105–108.

== Interviews ==
=== Audio ===
- Smith, S. Daniel (May 7, 2020). "S1 E6 Interview with Taylor Anderson". Coffee in Space (podcast). Season 1. Episode 6.
- Rutherford, Jeff (April 2009). "Taylor Anderson interview" (Podcast). Reading and Writing Podcast. No. 5.

=== Written ===
- Majstorovic, Ivan (March 3, 2020). "An Interview with Destroyermen Author Taylor Anderson". SCIFI.radio. Archived from the original on August 28, 2021.
- Mitrovich, Matt (May 4, 2016). "Interview with Destroyermen author Taylor Anderson". SFFWorld.

== See also ==
- William Dufris
