= Crusade (Anderson novel) =

2008 novel by Taylor Anderson

- First edition
- Author: Taylor Anderson
- Language: English
- Series: Destroyermen
- Genre: Alternate history
- Publisher: Roc Books
- Publication date: 2008
- Publication place: United States
- Media type: Print
- Pages: 388
- ISBN: 978-0-451-46230-5
- OCLC: 466348328
- Preceded by: Into the Storm
- Followed by: Maelstrom

Crusade is the second book of the Destroyermen series, by Taylor Anderson. Matthew Reddy, and the crew of USS Walker, are reunited with the destroyer USS Mahan, and set out to fight the Grik. Reddy and Walker's marine detachment, continue training the Lemurians to defend themselves and take the war to the Grik. The Grik have now taken over the ship that was chasing them, the Japanese battlecruiser Amagi.

== Plot synopsis ==
Lieutenant Commander Matthew Reddy, and the crew of USS Walker, have located USS Mahan, and are preparing to take the fight to the Grik. Reddy personally leads the first land assault against the Griks to defend a warrior tribe of Monkey-Cats. Amagi is discovered by aerial reconnaissance of a Grik Armada on an obvious heading to the Walker's location. In a repeat of actual history Reddy orchestrates another evacuation of Surabaya. Surface action ensues.

== See also ==
- USS Walker (DD-163) - the basis for USS Walker
- USS Mahan (DD-102) - the basis for USS Mahan
- Japanese battlecruiser Amagi - the basis for Amagi
