= Into the Storm (novel) =

Book by Taylor Anderson

- First edition
- Author: Taylor Anderson
- Cover artist: Studio Liddell
- Language: English
- Series: Destroyermen
- Genre: Alternate history
- Publisher: Roc Books
- Publication date: 2008
- Publication place: United States
- Media type: Print
- Pages: 386
- ISBN: 978-0-451-46207-7
- OCLC: 185026595
- Followed by: Crusade

Into the Storm is the first book of the Destroyermen series of alternate history novels by Taylor Anderson. The main setting of the series is the four-stacker USS Walker, which in this series is part of the United States Asiatic Fleet, and being pursued by the Japanese battlecruiser Amagi.

== Plot synopsis ==
In 1942, the American destroyer USS Walker (DD-163), a World War I 'four-piper', is part of the United States Asiatic Fleet. Lieutenant Commander Matthew Reddy is Walker's captain.

Walker and her sister ship, USS Mahan (DD-102), enter a squall and emerge on an alternate Earth where humans never evolved, but two intelligent races, the Lemurians and the Grik (a race of evolved "dinosaurs" from Africa), are at war. The Grik have a class system, in which the Uul are the soldiers, workers, etc., and the Hij are the leaders. The Lemurians are peaceful refugees from Madagascar that possibly evolved from lemurs. Reddy meets twice with the Lemurians' leadership. The Lemurians' king and his advisers tell him that others came to their world before him. Reddy and the crew of Walker side with the Lemurians.

The Lemurians and Grik are very technologically behind. The ships that they have are from the 1800s, specifically the British India Company.
