= Destroyermen =

Alternate history novel series by Taylor Anderson

Destroyermen series
- Into the Storm (2008); Crusade (2008); Maelstrom (2009); Distant Thunders (2010); Rising Tides (2011); Firestorm (2011); Iron Gray Sea (2012); Storm Surge (2013); Deadly Shores (2014); Straits of Hell (2015); Blood in the Water (2016); Devil's Due (2017); River of Bones (2018); Pass of Fire (2019); Winds of Wrath (2020)
- Author: Taylor Anderson
- Country: United States
- Language: English
- Genre: Alternate history
- Publisher: Roc Books
- Published: June 2008 – June 2020
- Media type: Print (hardback & paperback) & ebook
- No. of books: 15
- Followed by: Artillerymen

The Destroyermen series is a series of alternate history books written by American writer and historian Taylor Anderson. The fifteen books in the series are Into the Storm, Crusade (both 2008), Maelstrom (2009), Distant Thunders (2010), Rising Tides, Firestorm (both 2011), Iron Gray Sea (2012), Storm Surge (2013), Deadly Shores (2014), Straits of Hell (2015), Blood in the Water (2016), Devil's Due (2017), River of Bones (2018), Pass of Fire (2019), and Winds of Wrath (2020).

The books chronicle the adventures of the crews of the destroyer USS Walker (DD-163) and the Japanese battlecruiser Amagi, in the early stages of the War in the Pacific during World War II, being transported to an alternate Earth. This Earth is relatively the same geographically as the one they left, but evolution took a different turn eons ago.

The series ends with the fifteenth book of the series, Winds of Wrath, which was released in June 2020, while a prequel series, Artillerymen, began publication in September 2021 with Purgatory's Shore.

== Summary of the books ==
=== Into the Storm ===
In Into the Storm, the story begins during the Second Battle of the Java Sea. The USS Walker (DD-163) is a destroyer of the United States Asiatic Fleet, commanded by Lieutenant Commander Matthew Reddy. The Walker was a part of the surviving ABDACOM fleet, consisting of the Royal Navy cruiser HMS Exeter, HMS Encounter, and the United States Navy destroyers Pope and Mahan, all of which were fleeing from Japanese naval forces. However, the Japanese forces closed range, and opened up on the small Allied fleet. The Exeter took a major hit, and ordered the remaining four destroyers to leave the crippled cruiser.

The destroyers were systematically sunk, starting with the Encounter, followed by the Pope shortly thereafter just as happened in the real naval battle. The surviving destroyers, Walker and Mahan, then encountered the Japanese battlecruiser Amagi. Seeing no other option, Lieutenant Commander Reddy commanded the pair of destroyers to stage a torpedo attack, which sank an accompanying destroyer, and badly damaged the battlecruiser, before the ships were enveloped in a freak squall, and transported to an alternate world, where humans never evolved, apparently because the Cretaceous–Paleogene extinction event (specifically the Chicxulub asteroid impact) never occurred.

There are two races. One, the Lemurians, who evolved from giant lemurs from Madagascar, are peaceful farmers and fishermen, and live on huge oceangoing houseboats called Homes. Walker's captain, Lieutenant Commander Matthew Reddy, meets with the Lemurian leadership, and forms an alliance with them to fight the other race, the Grik, who are at war with the Lemurians. The Grik are possible descendants of the dinosaur genus Velociraptor.

=== Crusade ===
Second book in the series that was released in October 2008.

In the second book, Crusade, Reddy, and the crew of Walker, are training the Lemurians how to fight. The Amagi is now under Grik control, and her captain is half-mad.

=== Maelstrom ===
Third book in the series that was released in February 2009.

By Maelstrom, Reddy, his crew, and their Lemurian allies, are fighting the Grik. By Distant Thunders, the tide is turning. This book introduces the USS S-19 (SS-124), an S-class submarine from an alternative timeline in which the submarine was not scrapped, and initial contact with a society that was created by descendants of a ship from the British East India Company that was transported to this universe two centuries earlier.

=== Distant Thunders ===
Distant Thunders, the fourth book in the series, was released in June 2010. This book introduces the appearance of the SS Santa Catalina, a pre-World War I cargo ship that came from an alternative timeline in which the ship had never undergone the conversion into a destroyer tender, with its cargo of Curtiss P-40 Warhawks.

=== Rising Tides ===
Rising Tides, the fifth novel in the series, was released in February 2011.

=== Firestorm ===
Firestorm, book six of the series, was released in October 2011.

The book follows the growing threat from the "Dominion", a Grik / Japanese superweapon, and the arrival of more ships through the "squall", including a Japanese Kagerō-class destroyer called Hidoiame (which translates as "Terrible Rain").

=== Iron Gray Sea ===
Book 7, Iron Gray Sea, was released in July 2012. Many new developments but also picks up some older story lines that had previously taken a sideline.

Lieutenant Commander Matthew Reddy, Commander-in-Chief Allied Forces and the captain of USS Walker, marries Nurse Lieutenant Sandra Tucker. The Grand Alliance is taking the war to the Grik and the Japanese. The Lemurians, Walker's allies, have been fighting the Grik for a year and are now winning. Walker, in the past year, has been rebuilt, and is now part of the Little class.

This book introduces the a human-Lemarian culture called the Republic of Real People in what would be South Africa. Also introduced in this book is the German ocean liner SMS Amerika that was transported from a different timeline. It was later revealed in Deadly Seas that Amerika was converted to an armed merchant cruiser during the First World War when it was transported to the alternate universe just after battling the British armed merchant cruiser RMS Mauretania in the South Atlantic instead of being stuck in an American port in the world the USS Walker came from.

=== Storm Surge ===
Book 8 was released on July 2, 2013.

The eighth book picks up with the desperate situation in Grik India from Book 7, as well as covering some new developments on the Eastern Front in the battle against the Dominion.

=== Deadly Shores ===
Book 9 was published in May 2014. It deals with the Alliance invasion of the heart of the Grik Empire.

=== Straits of Hell ===
Book 10 was published in May 2015. It dealt with the Alliance's attempts to keep the Grik from reconquering the Lemurians' ancestral home of Madagascar, battles against the Dominion on land and at sea, introduction of the League of Tripoli and various other plot points.

=== Blood in the Water ===
Book 11 of the series was released in June 2016

=== Devil's Due ===
The twelfth book in the series was released in June 2017. The Alliance begins a more active fight against the League of Tripoli, a military coalition that was led by the Parti Populaire Français from a different alternative timeline in which France, instead of Germany, became the dominant fascist power in Europe. Some of the vessels that were brought over included the French submarine Surcouf, the French Bretagne-class battleship Savoie, the Italian Leone-class destroyer Leopardo, and the Spanish Alsedo-class destroyer Antúnez along with a German Junkers Ju 52 trimotor transport aircraft and a squadron of Italian license-built Messerschmitt Bf 109 fighter aircraft. The frequently mentioned mysterious German submarine was later revealed to be the Type XI U-boat U-112 in the next novel, River of Bones.

=== River of Bones ===
Penguin Random House published River of Bones, the thirteenth book in the series, in July 2018 to generally favorable reviews. The machinations of the League of Tripoli continue as do the wars against the Grik and the Doms. Matthew Reddy is forced to command a new ship, as the Walker is too badly damaged. More details are given about the group of people calling themselves the "New United States", the descendants of American soldiers who were originally being transported in 1847 on oceanic vessels across the Gulf of Mexico as part of the amphibious assault on Veracruz during the Mexican–American War. This event is detailed far more extensively in Taylor's subsequent series, "Artillerymen", beginning with Purgatory's Shore.

=== Pass of Fire ===
In June 2019, Penguin Random House released Pass of Fire, the fourteenth book in the series. As the Allied army under Captain Reddy marches towards the Grik capital of Sofesshk in Africa, General Shinya and his Army of the Sisters prepare to battle the Dominion at El Paso del Fuego in South America.

=== Winds of Wrath ===
The fifteenth and final book in the series, Winds of Wrath, was released by Penguin Random House in June 2020. After capturing the Grik capital in Africa in the last book, Allied armies march upon the increasingly desperate remnants of the Grik army commanded by First General Esshk. In the Caribbean, the Allies marshall their "modern" warships - including Captain Reddy's Walker, the captured super-dreadnought Savoie, and even newly built vessels from the Union, Empire and Republic—against a mighty armada of League battleships for a climactic duel of fire and flashes.

== See also ==
- William Dufris, the audiobook reader
- The Lost Regiment
- Tantor Audio, the publisher of the audiobook version of the books
- United States Asiatic Fleet

== General and cited references ==
- "Review of Destroyermen: Into the Storm in Specialty bookshelf: reviews of science fiction, mystery and children's titles". Rocky Mountain News. August 1, 2008.
- Review of Into the Storm—Alternate History.com, August 25, 2010
- John Ottinger III. Book Review: Destroyermen – Into the Storm by Taylor Anderson. August 25, 2010
- Book Review – Maelstrom
- "The World of Destroyermen" by Taylor Anderson
  - The official site's page for Into the Storm
  - The official site's page for Crusade
  - The official site's page for Maelstrom
  - The official site's page for Distant Thunders
  - The official site's page for Rising Tides
  - The official site's page for Firestorm
  - The official site's page for Iron Gray Sea
