= USS S-19 =

S-class submarine of the United States

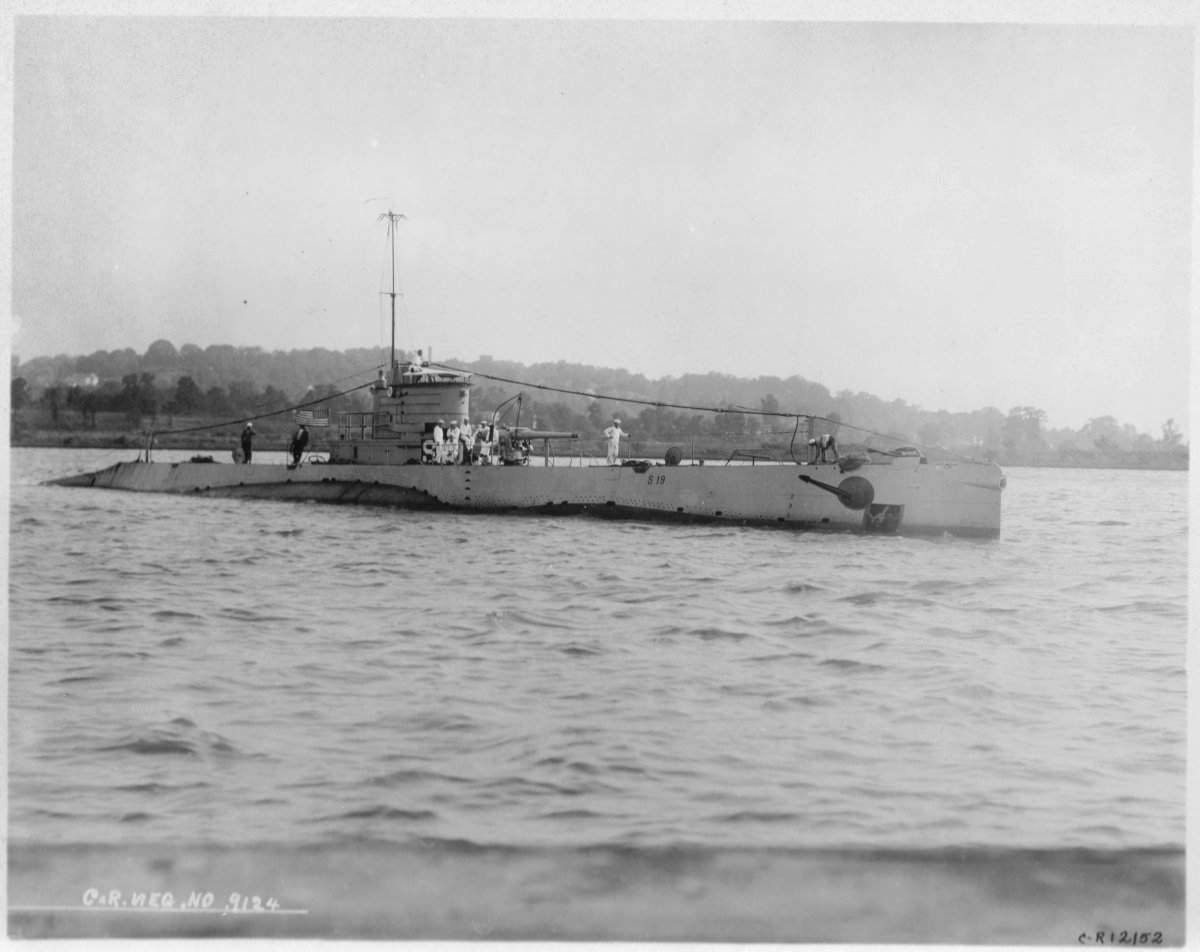
- USS S-19 (SS-124) on the Thames River at New London, Connecticut, c. 1923 and 1930

History

United States
- Name: S-19
- Builder: Fore River Shipyard, Quincy, Massachusetts
- Cost: $677,622.76 (hull and machinery)
- Laid down: 15 August 1918
- Launched: 21 June 1920
- Sponsored by: Miss Genevieve Kittinger
- Commissioned: 24 August 1921
- Decommissioned: 8 March 1922
- Commissioned: 6 January 1923
- Decommissioned: 10 February 1934
- Stricken: 18 December 1938
- Identification: Hull symbol: SS-124; Call sign: NING
- Fate: Sunk as a target, 18 December 1938

General characteristics
- Class & type: S-18-class submarine
- Displacement: 930 long tons (945 t) surfaced; 1,094 long tons (1,112 t) submerged
- Length: 219 feet 3 inches (66.83 m)
- Beam: 20 ft 8 in (6.30 m)
- Draft: 17 ft 3 in (5.26 m)
- Installed power: 1,200 brake horsepower (895 kW) diesel; 2,375 hp (1,771 kW) electric
- Propulsion: 2 × NELSECO diesel engines; 2 × Ridgway Dynamo & Engine Company electric motors; 2 × 60-cell batteries; 2 × Propellers
- Speed: 14.5 knots (26.9 km/h; 16.7 mph) surfaced; 11 kn (20 km/h; 13 mph) submerged
- Range: 3,420 nmi (6,330 km; 3,940 mi) at 6.5 kn (12.0 km/h; 7.5 mph) surfaced; 8,950 nmi (16,580 km; 10,300 mi) at 9.5 kn (17.6 km/h; 10.9 mph) surfaced with fuel in main ballast tanks; 20 hours at 5 knots (9 km/h; 6 mph) submerged
- Test depth: 200 ft (61 m)
- Capacity: 41,921 US gallons (158,690 L; 34,907 imp gal) fuel oil
- Complement: 4 officers; 34 enlisted
- Armament: 4 × 21-inch (533 mm) torpedo tubes (12 torpedoes); 1 × 4-inch (102 mm)/50-caliber

USS S-19 (SS-124) was an S-18-class submarine, also referred to as an S-1-class or "Holland"-type, of the United States Navy, in commission from 1924 to 1938.

== Design ==
The S-18-class had a length of 219 feet 3 inches (66.8 m) overall, a beam of 20 ft 8 in (6.3 m), and a mean draft of 17 ft 3 in (5.3 m). They displaced 930 long tons (940 t) on the surface and 1,094 long tons (1,112 t) submerged. All S-class submarines had a crew of 4 officers and 34 enlisted men, when first commissioned. They had a diving depth of 200 ft (61.0 m).

For surface running, the S-18-class were powered by two 600-brake-horsepower (447 kW) NELSECO diesel engines, each driving one propeller shaft. When submerged each propeller was driven by a 1,175-horsepower (876 kW) Ridgway Dynamo & Engine Company electric motor. They could reach 14.5 knots (26.9 km/h; 16.7 mph) on the surface and 11 kn (20 km/h; 13 mph) underwater.

The boats were armed with four 21-inch (533 mm) torpedo tubes in the bow. They carried eight reloads, for a total of twelve torpedoes. The S-18-class submarines were also armed with a single 4 in (100 mm)/50 caliber deck gun.

== Construction ==
S-19's keel was laid down on 15 August 1918, by the Electric Boat Company, of New York City, on subcontract to Bethlehem Shipbuilding Corporation's Fore River Shipyard, in Quincy, Massachusetts. She was launched on 21 June 1920, sponsored by Miss Genevieve Kittinger, and commissioned on 24 August 1921.

== Service history ==
After preliminary shakedown operations, S-19 was decommissioned and returned to the contractor, on 8 March 1922, for further work to remedy defects revealed in her first weeks of operation. Upon her return to the United States Navy, S-19 recommissioned at Groton, Connecticut, on 6 January 1923.

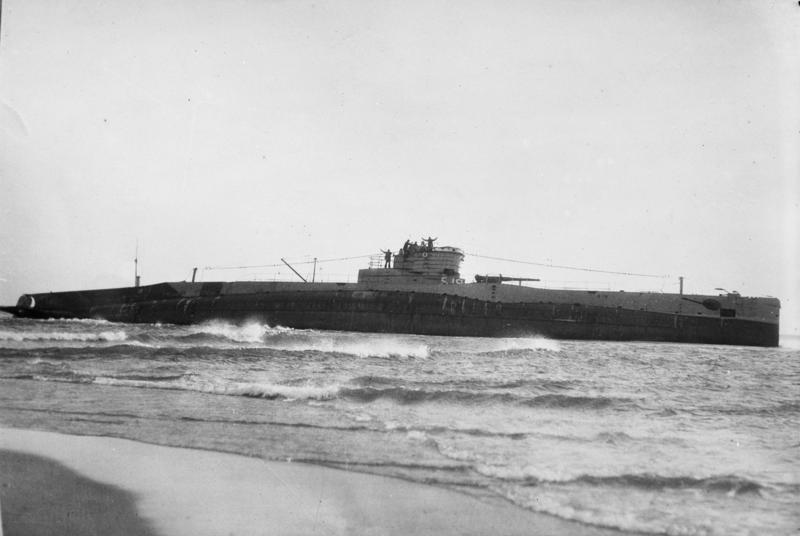
A photograph of the stranded S-19 off Chatham, Massachusetts, in January 1925

S-19 operated off the northeastern coast of the United States from 1923 to 1930, taking part in fleet exercises off Panama, in the early months of each year.

This routine was interrupted in the foggy, early hours of 13 January 1925, when the submarine ran aground off Chatham, Massachusetts, on the southern coast of Cape Cod, after strong winds and unusually heavy seas had pushed her far from her course. She had departed Portsmouth Navy Yard, in Kittery, Maine, the previous afternoon after overhaul, and was en route to New London, Connecticut. The United States Coast Guard cutters Tampa and Acushnet came to S-19's assistance, as did life-saving crews from two nearby Coast Guard stations. Heavy seas made it impossible to pass a line to the grounded submarine or to reach her by boat until late on the evening of 14 January, when a party from Coast Guard Station Nauset, succeeded in boarding. By the morning of 15 January, S-19's crew had been safely brought to shore. After strenuous effort by Navy tugs and the Coast Guard cutters, S-19 was finally freed from the shoal.

Repaired and returned to service with the fleet, S-19 continued her Atlantic operations until 22 October 1930, when she departed New London, for the Pacific Ocean. The submarine arrived at Pearl Harbor, in the Territory of Hawaii, on 7 December 1930, and for the next three years operated from there.

== Fate ==
S-19 was decommissioned at Pearl Harbor, on 10 February 1934. She was struck from the Naval Vessel Register on 12 December 1936. She was towed to sea and scuttled on 18 December 1938, in accordance with the terms of the Second London Naval Treaty.

== In fiction ==
In Taylor Anderson's Destroyermen series, S-19 remains in service into World War II, and is transported to an alternate Earth, along with several other vessels, including the destroyers USS Walker and USS Mahan.

S-19 was featured in the Call of Cthulhu: Dark Corners of the Earth campaign Raid on Innsmouth.

== Bibliography ==
- "Table 21 - Ships on Navy List June 30, 1919". Congressional Serial Set. U.S. Government Printing Office: 770. 1921.
- Friedman, Norman (1995). U.S. Submarines Through 1945: An Illustrated Design History. Annapolis, Maryland: Naval Institute Press. ISBN 1-55750-263-3.
- Priolo, Gary. "S-19 (SS-124)". Navsource.net.
- Hall, Anne Martin (1925). Ships of the United States navy and their sponsors, 1913-1923.
- "S-19 (SS-124)". Dictionary of American Naval Fighting Ships. Navy Department, Naval History and Heritage Command. 20 August 2024. This article incorporates text from this source, which is in the public domain.
