= Rocky and the Dodos =

- Title screen
- Genre: Comedy
- Created by: Isabell Mills; Shanii Novak
- Written by: Chris Allen
- Directed by: Sarah Ball
- Voices of: Bill Dufris; Maggie Fox; Marc Silk
- Country of origin: United Kingdom
- Original language: English
- No. of seasons: 2
- No. of episodes: 26

Production
- Running time: 10 min (per episode)
- Production companies: Cosgrove Hall Films; Central Independent Television

Original release
- Network: ITV (CITV)
- Release: 28 April 1998 – 27 July 1999

Rocky and the Dodos is a British stop motion animated television series seen on CITV between 28 April 1998 and 27 July 1999. The show was animated by Cosgrove Hall Films and created by Isabell Mills and Shanii Novak. Rocky And The Dodos aired on then-new channel Toons & Tunes (later renamed Pop) in 2003.

== Premise ==
The series focuses on a group of anthropomorphic dodos who live on a remote, rocky island. The action rarely moves away from it. Although the series is recognisably set in the modern day, with aeroplanes and electricity, the island is seemingly unknown to man. Various pieces of man-made detritus, such as household appliances, foodstuffs and furniture, regularly wash up on the island, and often play a central role in episode plots.

The dodos have only the vaguest notion of any life away from their island, referring to everything away from the immediate vicinity as 'the beyond', and refer to the semi-mythical beings which populate it as 'Fartians'.

== Characters ==
Rocky - A young male dodo who lives in a cave with Elvis. He is good-natured, impressionable and always eager for adventure, though Elvis' antics sometimes cause more trouble than he can comfortably handle.

Elvis - A bizarre bird who lives with Rocky. It is not made clear how they first met. Elvis resembles a cross between a penguin and a blue-footed booby, though has a long flexible tongue; it is never made clear exactly what species he is (indeed he seems not to know himself). He has an outrageous, excitable manner, and is inclined to cause chaos and mayhem at every opportunity. He is, however, more intelligent than most of the dodos, and enjoys playing tricks on them if he gets the chance.

Bill - The rather vain and slightly camp dodo who owns and operates the Loose Juice Bar on the island, where he creates popular (but odd) cocktails. He has a large, prominent quiff of which he is inordinately proud.

Wonda - The wife of Bill. She has orange, frizzy hair and wears a necklace of seashells. She is probably (at least in comparison with the others), the cleverest of the dodos, regularly alluding to the words and actions of the 'ancient dodos', and sometimes acts as the group's de facto leader or organiser should a situation require one.

Tantra - A young female dodo who has an appearance and mannerism modeled on punk subculture, with her hair dyed bright red and her beak painted in bright colours. She wears a bath-chain (complete with plug) on the end of her beak. She is friendly with Elvis (even replacing Rocky in their cave in one episode), but seems to spend most of her time alone.

Astra - A scatological and eccentric female dodo who speaks with an upper-class English accent and lives in the uppermost cave on the island (accessible by a lift seen in the title-sequence). She is obsessed with studying the various objects from 'the beyond' which wash up on the island's shores, and working towards making contact with the 'Fartians'. For all her scholarly airs, she is not very intelligent, and generally misidentifies the things she discovers, thinking for example, that a clothes horse is a skeleton, and that a rubber duck is alive.

Dougan - A lazy and less-than-bright walrus who lives at the island's rubbish-dump.

Bjorn - An affable Swedish-accented puffin who regularly visits the island. Owing to his ability to fly, he has a far better understanding of 'the beyond' than the dodos.

The Limpets - A large, unspecified number of limpets which live both around and on the island. They move much quicker than real limpets, and have prominent eyes on the tops of their shells. Although they do not speak, they have considerable intelligence. They rarely play an important role in stories, but are vital to the island's smooth (as much as this is possible) operation, as they provide power to the various appliances by running in devices which resemble large hamster wheels.

== List of episodes ==
=== Series 1 ===
No.	Title	Original release date
1	"It's Good to Squawk"	28 April 1998
Elvis find a cell phone on the beach, and Rocky develops feelings for it.
2	"Rock Chick"	5 May 1998
Tantra wants to be rich and famous as a punk rockstar, so the other dodos organise a concert for her.
3	"Eggs Stink"	12 May 1998
The Loose Juice Bar has run out of rockweed, so Bill sends Rocky and Elvis to get some more.
4	"Eye of the Dodo"	19 May 1998
One night, the Limpets disappear, leaving the island without power and Elvis feeling guilty.
5	"Dodo Abduction"	26 May 1998
Some food drops out of an aeroplane, which Astra mistakes as a sign from the Fartians. Unbeknownst to the other dodos, Elvis has eaten the so-called "sign".
6	"When the Green Stuff Turns Fluffy"	2 June 1998
Rocky wants to learn to fly, and Bjorn helps him, forgetting that dodos don't fly.
7	"Three Footed Fartians"	9 June 1998
Elvis finds an iron on the beach, which he uses to make footprints with. Astra mistakes the footprints for Fartian footprints, and decides to follow them.
8	"On the Rocks"	16 June 1998
A lemonade bottle washes up on the dodos' island, and Rocky tries to find out what it is, while also trying to figure out what dodos actually do.
9	"Cheese Means Dreams"	23 June 1998
Dougan eats some really smelly cheese, and that night, he dreams that the island is sinking. The next morning, he tries to convince everyone to evacuate the island immediately.
10	"Hey Blue Foot"	30 June 1998
Rocky finds a CD on the beach, and gives it to Bjorn for safekeeping - unfortunately, he loses it to another puffin called Ulrika.
11	"The Limpet Olympics"	7 July 1998
The Limpet Olympics are taking place on the island. Meanwhile, Elvis gets a job at the Loose Juice Bar as Bill's apprentice.
12	"Cry Beak"	14 July 1998
Elvis learns a lesson when he starts pretending to be in trouble.
13	"Cheatin' Chick"	21 July 1998
Elvis finds a can of shaving cream on the beach, and passes it off as a delicacy - naturally, the others believe him. This also tells the story about how Elvis came the island.

=== Series 2 ===
No.	Title	Original release date
1	"Friends and Anemones"	4 May 1999
Rocky decides to dump Elvis as a friend, and tries to get himself a new one.
2	"Café Dodo"	11 May 1999
While reminiscing about Café Dodo, Wanda decides to reopen it.
3	"Mind Over Mutter"	18 May 1999
Tantra develops a hypnosis ability, and she uses it to hypnotise the other dodos. Only Bjorn is unaffected - can he save them?
4	"Dodos Just Wanna Have Fun"	25 May 1999
Elvis moves away from Rocky's flat, and with Tantra's help, he decides to become a better bird.
5	"Double O' Dodo"	1 June 1999
While Rocky secretly tries to find a supposed Dodo spy, Wanda and Bill organise a surprise birthday party for Rocky.
6	"A Creep in the Night"	8 June 1999
During a solar eclipse, Elvis takes the opportunity to disguise himself as a Fartian and scare the others.
7	"Seeing is Deceiving"	15 June 1999
An inflatable duck washes up on the beach, and Rocky, who calls it Oberod, decides to make friends with it, making Elvis jealous.
8	"The Root of All Weevils"	22 June 1999
When Bill's free drinks cause annoyance amongst the other dodos, Wanda decides to introduce corals as a currency.
9	"Listen with Rocky"	29 June 1999
Elvis can't sleep and tries to get Rocky to tell him a bedtime story.
10	"You've Been Blamed"	6 July 1999
Rocky finds a video camera on the beach, which has a tape of all Elvis' atrocities. Can Elvis explain himself to the others?
11	"Peck to the Future"	13 July 1999
Rocky and Elvis take a trip into outer space in a converted bathtub. When they land on another planet, however, they are taken prisoner by what appear to be Fartians.
12	"Dodos That Go Flap in the Night"	20 July 1999
Bill starts sleepwalking, and Elvis takes an opportunity to cause more mischief.
13	"Where Have All the Dodos Gone?"	27 July 1999
The dodos gather together in a secret cave for Dodo Memorial Day, leaving Elvis all alone on the island.

== Release ==
On 13 January 2003, Cinema Club and Granada Media released 2 DVDs and videos of Rocky and the Dodos, one with Episodes 1–6, and one with Episodes 7–12. So far, the final episode of Series 1 and all of Series 2 have not been released in the UK, but some episodes from Series 2 were released on video in Australia by ABC Video and in Germany by VCL.
