= USS Saco (1863) =

Gunboat

History

United States
- Name: USS Saco
- Builder: Boston Navy Yard, Boston, Massachusetts
- Launched: 28 August 1863
- Commissioned: 11 July 1864
- Decommissioned: 27 January 1865
- Recommissioned: 10 June 1866
- Decommissioned: 17 December 1868
- Recommissioned: 22 July 1870
- Decommissioned: 13 July 1876
- Fate: Sold 20 November 1883

General characteristics
- Type: Gunboat
- Displacement: 593 long tons (603 t)
- Length: 179 ft 6 in (54.71 m)
- Beam: 30 ft 6 in (9.30 m)
- Draft: 11 ft 6 in (3.51 m)
- Speed: 9.5 knots (17.6 km/h; 10.9 mph)
- Complement: 127 officers and enlisted
- Armament: 1 × 100-pounder gun; 1 × 30-pounder Parrott rifle; 6 × 32-pounder guns; 1 × 24-pounder howitzer; 1 × 12-pounder rifle; 1 × 32-pounder smoothbore

The first USS Saco was a gunboat in the United States Navy during the American Civil War.

== Construction and commissioning ==
Saco was launched on 28 August 1863 by the Boston Navy Yard, Boston, Massachusetts, and commissioned there on 11 July 1864, Lieutenant Commander John G. Walker in command.

== Service history ==
Throughout the autumn and into the winter of 1864, the new gunboat cruised along the east coast of North America, ranging from Halifax, Nova Scotia, Canada, to Wilmington, North Carolina, in search of Confederate States Navy raiders and blockade runners. However, since boiler and engine trouble hampered the ship during much of this service, Saco was decommissioned at the Washington Navy Yard in Washington, D.C., on 27 January 1865 for repairs.

The American Civil War ended in April 1865 while work on Saco was still in progress, so Saco remained in ordinary during the demobilization program which followed the end of the fighting. She was recommissioned on 10 June 1866 and operated along the United States East Coast, in the Caribbean, and in the Gulf of Mexico. She also served as a training ship at the United States Naval Academy at Annapolis, Maryland, before decommissioning at Norfolk, Virginia, on 17 December 1868.

Recommissioned on 22 July 1870, Saco departed Hampton Roads, Virginia, on 6 August 1870 and steamed to European waters. She cruised in the Mediterranean for over a year before getting underway from Naples, Italy, on 14 December 1871 and heading for the Suez Canal and the Far East.

After arriving at Shanghai on 6 May 1872, Saco remained in East Asian waters until returning to the United States in 1876. She was decommissioned at the Mare Island Navy Yard in California on 13 July 1876 and remained in ordinary there until she was sold to William E. Mighell on 20 November 1883.

== See also ==
- Union Navy
- Union Blockade
