= USS Acushnet =

Tugboat of the United States Navy

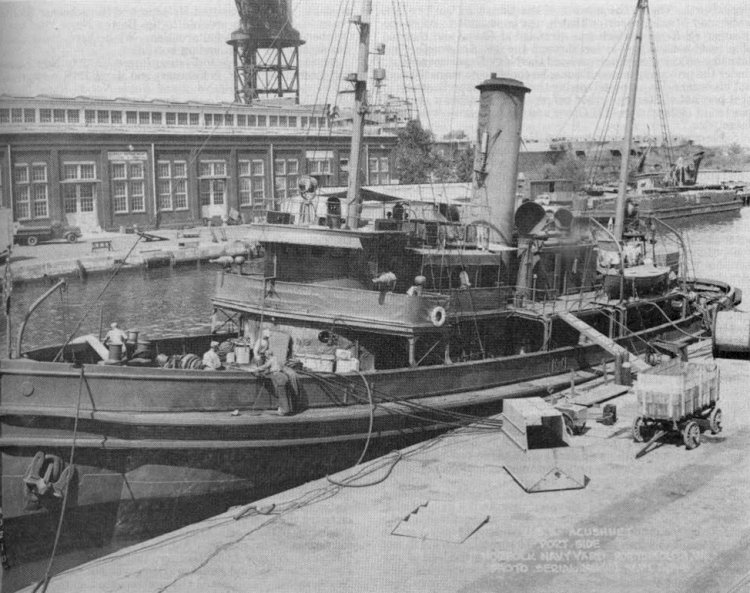
- Acushnet at Norfolk Navy Yard, 8 September 1941.

History

United States Revenue Cutter Service
- Name: USRC Acushnet
- Namesake: Acushnet, Massachusetts
- Builder: Newport News Shipbuilding and Drydock Co., Newport News, Virginia.
- Launched: 16 May 1908
- Sponsored by: Miss Alayce Duff
- Reclassified: USCGC Acushnet, 28 January 1915
- Fate: Transferred to U.S. Navy, spring 1917

United States Navy
- Name: USS Acushnet
- Acquired: spring 1917
- Fate: Returned to U.S. Coast Guard, 22 September 1919

United States Coast Guard
- Name: USCGC Acushnet
- Acquired: 22 September 1919
- Fate: Transferred to Navy, 30 May 1936

United States Navy
- Name: USS Acushnet (AT-63)
- Acquired: 30 May 1936
- Commissioned: 1 September 1936
- Reclassified: Fleet Tug Old (ATO-63) 17 July 1944
- Decommissioned: 14 December 1945
- Stricken: 8 January 1946
- Fate: Transferred to the Maritime Commission for disposal, 12 December 1946

General characteristics
- Displacement: 860 tons
- Length: 152 ft (46 m)
- Beam: 29 ft (8.8 m)
- Draft: 18 ft 9 in (5.72 m)
- Propulsion: steam
- Speed: 12.5 knots (23.2 km/h; 14.4 mph)
- Complement: 38
- Armament: two 1-pounders

Acushnet – a steel-hulled revenue cutter – was launched on 16 May 1908 at Newport News, Virginia, by the Newport News Shipbuilding and Drydock Co.; sponsored by Miss Alayce Duff; and commissioned at Baltimore on 6 November 1908. She saw service as a United States Revenue Cutter Service cutter, a U.S. Navy fleet tug, and as a U.S. Coast Guard cutter. She was taken out of service 8 January 1946.

== U.S. Revenue Cutter Service ==
USRC Acushnet was assigned to the Revenue Cutter Service station at Woods Hole, Massachusetts, with her cruising grounds to encompass Buzzard's Bay, Nantucket Shoals, and adjacent waters. Departing the Revenue Cutter Service Depot at Arundel Cove, South Baltimore, on 8 November 1908, Acushnet reached her home port on the 27th.

Over the next decade, Acushnet operated out of Woods Hole and ranged the middle and northeastern seaboard of the United States, occasionally visiting the Depot at Arundel Cove, Curtis Bay; the towns of New Bedford and Marblehead, Massachusetts, New London, Connecticut, and Norfolk, Virginia. She patrolled regattas – including Ivy League contests between Harvard and Yale – and represented the Revenue Cutter Service at such events as the International Yacht Races at Marblehead and the Cotton Centennial Carnival at Fall River, Mass., in June 1911. In addition, due to her robust construction, the ship performed yearly "winter cruising" in the bitterly cold sea lanes of the North Atlantic to assist ships and mariners in distress. On 11 February 1914 she towed the lumber schooner Dustin G. Cressy to safety after she stranded off the Pamet River Life Saving Station in a snowstorm. Cressy drifted off on her own but was still in danger of being wrecked when she was taken into tow. During the first decade of her service, the Coast Guard Act became law on 28 January 1915 joining the Lifesaving Service and the Revenue Cutter Service to form the United States Coast Guard. On 15 April 1915 she pulled off schooner George E. Klink that went aground on Tom Shoal, or Hawes Shoal, off Cape Poge, Martha's Vineyard, Massachusetts in heavy weather earlier in the day.

== U.S. Navy service in World War I ==
Upon the entry of the United States into World War I in the spring of 1917, the Coast Guard cutter came under the aegis of the United States Navy as the United States Treasury Department relinquished control of its ships so that they might take part in the conflict. Initially, her station remained the same, Woods Hole; but, in the winter of 1917, she shifted to more northern climes. Her winter-cruising activities then proved to be good conditioning for her duty during the latter half of December 1917 and the first few months of 1918.

=== Northern operations ===
In mid-December 1917, upon the disablement of the cutter Androscoggin by a severe gale, USS Acushnet was dispatched to Miramichi Bay in New Brunswick to aid the distressed steamer Cadoras. However, she soon reported that the severe storm had forced her to heave to off Halifax, Nova Scotia, before carrying out her assignment. Before she could resume her mission, the object of her concern, Cadoras was later damaged so severely by the storm that she was abandoned as a total wreck.

Acushnet was next ordered to search the Gut of Canso for American Shipping Board vessels in distress, but soon received orders to prepare to tow and convoy the steamer War Victor to New York. Meanwhile, Acushnet carried out her assignment and reported that two of the four vessels in the Gut had been held up for want of coal; a third one was being repaired with 10 days estimated for completion of repairs; and the last, War Victor, was busily engaged in repairing a broken rudder. On 18 December, the day after the cutter had wired her report on shipping in the Gut, she radioed that she would be ready to tow and convoy War Victor as soon as she coaled, and added ominously: "Weather severe, coal scarce."

Taking advantage of a sudden change to good weather and the fact that no other vessels in the Gut required such assistance, Acushnet soon got underway from Port Hawkesbury with War Victor in tow, and reached New York on the evening of 23 December. She then received four days of needed voyage repairs at the New York Navy Yard, Brooklyn, N.Y., before returning to her base at New London. After taking on board hawsers and charts for Nova Scotia and the Gulf of Saint Lawrence, the cutter sailed for Halifax to relieve the Navy tugs Sonoma (AT-12) and Ontario (AT-13) in standing ready to provide assistance to Shipping Board vessels in the northern waters.

On 4 January, Acushnet received word that heavy ice had closed the Gut of Canso and that passage should be made north of Cape Breton Island; in addition, she was to search for survivors of the sunken steamer Iroquois, whose men were believed to have been shipwrecked on Bird Rock, north of the Magdalen Islands. Sailing from New London that day, the ship soon encountered a fierce northern gale and anchored in Nantucket Sound to await better weather. Her captain reported that so much ice had formed on the ship from the freezing of wind-whipped spray that her stability was seriously threatened.

However, before disaster struck, the tempest moderated and enabled Acushnet to relieve Sonoma at Souris, Prince Edward Island, on 10 January 1918. The latter soon proceeded to Halifax for coal. Acushnet then attempted to reach the shipwrecked mariners reported to be at Bird Rock but discovered weather conditions to be too severe to permit it.

Acushnet again attempted to reach Bird Rock on 17 January but was compelled to turn back due to heavy ice between Cape North and St. Paul Island. Acushnet accordingly altered course for Halifax and reported closely packed ice 25 miles from Sydney that, in local opinion, threatened to block the harbor. She subsequently reported that an "ice expert" at Sydney had advised strongly against risking Acushnet above Cape North. There, the master of the Canadian Government icebreaker Stanley reported that it was impossible to reach the steamer SS Keynor which was stranded at Gaspé and that his ship could not tow any vessel through the ice. Acushnet's commanding officer accordingly radioed the Navy Department that, under the prevailing ice conditions, he could do no more to carry out his orders. He proposed towing the disabled merchantmen in that port out of Stanley harbor before the ice reached it, but the master of neither ship – SS Cicoa and SS German – wanted to leave port.

Subsequently, Acushnet reached Halifax on 19 January for coal. Once there, she also learned that Cicoa, investigating the report of shipwrecked mariners, had managed to close Bird Rock on 11 January and signalled two men plainly visible on shore, but had received no reply to her signals. Acushnet's commanding officer considered this proof that there were no shipwrecked men there.

Shifting to Louisburg, Nova Scotia, soon thereafter, Acushnet attempted to float the damaged steamship Angouleme but after four attempts radioed that the methods being used to salvage the ship were impracticable, the discouraging situation leading Acushnet's skipper to radio on 28 January that "extensive wrecking operations" were required. The following day, 29 January, Acushnet departed Louisburg with SS Key West in tow, and took her to Halifax where they arrived soon thereafter.

Acushnet left Halifax on the last day of January with SS Adrian Iselin in tow, and brought that ship to anchorage off Stapleton, New York, on the afternoon of 3 February. Her arduous duty in Nova Scotian waters had caused the ship such great wear and tear that she needed a long stint of repairs before returning to sea. Thus, her crew enjoyed a brief respite from her toil that lasted into the second week of February 1918.

=== Atlantic coast operations ===
Upon completion of the yard work, Acushnet sailed for Newport, R.I., to tow a floating derrick from Newport to Hampton Roads, departing the former port at 09:00 on 24 February. Bad weather forced the ship and her valuable tow to put into New York on 28 February until improved conditions permitted her to resume her voyage.

After delivering her charge to Norfolk, Acushnet loaded a cargo of speaking tubes and delivered them to the Charleston Navy Yard at Charleston, S.C., where subchasers were being fitted-out for service, before proceeding on to the Washington Navy Yard to take on board 13 3-inch guns earmarked for installation in 110-foot (34 m) subchasers then under construction. Delivering the load of ordnance to New London soon thereafter, Acushnet reached New London in mid-March before she put into the Boston Navy Yard for repairs and alterations to living spaces on board on the 22d of that month.

Upon completion of repairs on 8 May, Acushnet proceeded to Bristol, R.I., and took delivery of the seaplane barge being built there for the Navy by the noted boat builders of the Herreshoff Manufacturing Company. She then delivered the boat to the New York Navy Yard and loaded a cargo of ammunition to be delivered to the Naval District Base, New London. Acushnet then took stores consigned to the Special Antisubmarine Force at Norfolk, Va., departing New London on 20 June and reaching her destination two days later. Upon arrival, she landed her cargo which included a special "listening device" and engine spare parts for subchasers. Acushnet departed Norfolk on the 23d and reached Lewes, Delaware, that same day to perform a brief period of temporary duty attached to the 4th Naval District.

Assigned to salvage duty in early July 1918, Acushnet was to enjoy special status, the Navy Department specifying on 16 July 1918 that "orders for movement of Acushnet will be issued from Washington and this vessel is not to be diverted to any other duty except by special permission from Operations ...." In this "new" capacity, the ship performed the same type of duty common to Coast Guard cutters – the removal of menaces to navigation and the assistance to ships in distress. For the next few weeks, basing at New London, Acushnet rendered assistance to the steamer Mahoning and the steamer Lake Crystal. During that time, the cutter received word on 4 August that she and Salvor were to be assigned to the Boston Station of the Northern District, but were to remain temporarily based on the salvage station at New London until the completion of the Boston base.

In September and October, Acushnet continued her salvage operations out of New London, receiving a respite to tow Charles Wittemore, a mission – despite its not being "salvage duty" – she was assigned under special permission since no other tug was available. She also assisted Helvetia and the schooner Eleanor Powers before being ordered to the Boston Navy Yard late in October for repairs and alternations. While there, the armistice was signed in France, ending hostilities.

Acushnet took Torpedo Testing Barge No. 2 to New London and, later, to Newport, in February and March 1919, respectively, before escorting Eagle No. 1 and Eagle No. 3 – slated for service in North Russia – to the New York Navy Yard on 4 and 5 March for repairs and alterations to prepare them for their future distant service. Later, Acushnet again towed Torpedo Testing Barge No. 2 from Newport to New London and back before taking the coal barge YC-289 from New London to Melville, R.I., and then returning to Boston to resume her duty as a salvage vessel.

However, this employment was soon to end, since, on 15 May 1919, Acting Secretary of the Navy Franklin D. Roosevelt ordered the Navy to discontinue salvage operations on civilian vessels. As a result, the cutter was assigned to the 1st Naval District on 28 May 1919.

Acushnet's naval service continued into the summer. Between 11 and 24 June, in company with the tug East Hampton, she towed Floating Derrick No. 21 from Boston to the New York Navy Yard and the floating derrick Hercules thence to Boston. Subsequently, Acushnet proceeded to New London, where she was to assist in mooring and handling G-2 (Submarine No. 27) during depth charge and net experiments in nearby Niantic Bay. Tragically, on 30 July 1919, the submersible suddenly flooded and sank, drowning three of the six-man inspection team then on board.

On 8 August 1919, following the completion of her part in the experimental work at New London, Acushnet received orders to return to the 1st Naval District; and, on 22 September 1919, she was returned to the Treasury Department for a resumption of Coast Guard service.

== U.S. Coast Guard service, 1919–36 ==
=== Salvages in 1920 ===
Resuming operations out of Woods Hole, USCGC Acushnet's cruising during the winter of 1919–1920 was highlighted by the assistance she rendered to the damaged USAT Powhatan which had been rendered powerless by clogged pumps, a flooded fireroom, and disabled machinery while proceeding from New York to Antwerp, Belgium, in January 1920 with some 500 passengers on board and a cargo valued at over $2,500,000. As she drifted at the mercy of the North Atlantic gales, Powhatan sent out a call for assistance by wireless. Aid soon arrived in the form of the Canadian steamer Lady Laurier, two destroyers, Leary and Sharkey, and USAT Northern Pacific. USCGC Ossipee appeared on the evening of 22 January and, upon request of Leary, removed 102 passengers and their baggage in boats from the cutter.

Summoned to the scene by the same SOS distress signal that had brought Ossipee, and later USCGC Gresham, to the area, Acushnet departed Woods Hole and arrived in the vicinity early on the morning of 23 January, finding that Lady Laurier had Powhatan in tow. The poor handling characteristics of the powerless transport, however, necessitated Acushnet's passing a 10-inch line to Powhatan's stern to aid in steering the ship while Ossipee ran a 12-inch line to the ship's bow. When this arrangement had been completed, the convoy set out. Acushnet's line parted but was quickly replaced, and the convoy resumed its progress toward Halifax at a snail's pace.

Gresham relieved the two "flushdeckers" late on 23 January, and all went well until the next morning when one mishap after another occurred to dog the salvagers' efforts. Ossipee's line to Lady Laurier parted, as did Acushnet's to Powhatan. Although the Coast Guardsmen managed to get lines back to their respective ships, Ossipee's again parted, leading Powhatan to signal that it would take the better part of the day to heave in chain and hawser and start over. The operation thus suspended until the arrival of a tug, Powhatan let slip Acushnet's hawser.

By this time, the weather had worsened considerably. A strong northeasterly gale, in concert with a blinding snowstorm, caused all ships to lose sight of each other in the swirling whiteness. Powhatan did not reappear until the afternoon of the 25th. That evening, however, the little convoy received reinforcement in its battle when the American Wrecking Company tug Relief – an appropriate name – arrived the morning of the 26th and picked up the tow. The group then again set out, with Ossipee aiding in steering Powhatan with a line on her starboard quarter and Acushnet leading the procession, ahead of Relief. Lady Laurier and Gresham stood by the convoy. Although the weather worsened and made progress difficult, the ships sighted the Halifax light vessel early in the afternoon of 27 January; and, soon thereafter, they helped the crippled transport to a safe haven.

On 7 February 1920 she picked up from lifeboats the survivors of SS Polias that had run aground and was wrecked on Old Cilly Ledge off Rockland, Maine in a snowstorm on 6 February.

Later that winter on 8 March 1920, Acushnet went to the aid of the steamer Guilford, which had run aground near Nantucket shoals. The tug Pocahontas had arrived on the scene beforehand and had removed the crew from the leaking ship, whose pumps had been choked by debris. Acushnet soon arrived on the scene and took the derelict in tow. She then brought the ship, valued at $630,000, into Vineyard Haven, Massachusetts, arriving on 10 March, where it could be salvaged and returned to service.

=== Prohibition ===
New duties in the enforcement of the 18th Amendment and the Volstead Act placed new responsibilities on the Coast Guard, presenting it with a task of some magnitude. Prohibition proved tough to enforce, as Acushnet and other cutters discovered. Acushnet's first brush with a denizen of "rum row" was an encounter, on 11 October 1921, with the schooner J. B. Young, off Nantucket. The cutter warned the craft to stay outside the three-mile limit, and the latter complied obediently – for a while. However, as soon as Acushnet steamed away, J. B. Young reversed course and touched at Vineyard Haven harbor to do a brisk business in her illicit liquor.

Later, the day before Christmas of 1921, with Acushnet on her yearly "winter cruising," the cutter chanced across the small steam tug Harbinger – the latter laden with 300 cases of Black & White Scotch whisky – and escorted her into Boston to see that she unloaded none of her cargo of spirits, and later, to Newport, Rhode Island. At each stop, federal law enforcement officials saw to it that the craft remained fully loaded.

In December 1922, Acushnet was provided with an opportunity to perform her primary function, that of aiding ships in distress, and her auxiliary function, the suppression of the bootleg liquor trade, when she went to the aid of the schooner Salvatrice. The latter, discharging her illegal cargo, became caught in an Atlantic gale that nearly crippled her. Acushnet, took the craft into Boston harbor, her pumps maintaining a successful battle to keep her "prize" afloat. Later, in 1924, Acushnet, in company with Customs' vessels, seized the rum-running yacht Fantensa.

Besides attempting – sometimes unsuccessfully – to stem the flow of illegal liquor into the United States, Coast Guard cutters also took part in operations clearing wrecks and derelicts from the sealanes off the coasts and in inland waterways.

=== Salvages in 1924–1936 ===
On 7 May 1924, Acushnet found the waterlogged schooner James C. Hamlen aground and at anchor; later, in company with tugs Commissioner and Alert, Acushnet succeeded in towing the schooner into Vineyard Haven so that she could be restored to service. In less than a year, Acushnet would again be involved in salvage work. On the morning of 13 January 1925, she was summoned to the entrance to Nauset harbor, on the eastern end of Cape Cod, Massachusetts, where submarine S-19 had run aground. Later that day, ships – including Acushnet and USCGC Tampa – converged on the scene to render assistance. Ultimately, salvage vessels hired by the Navy to perform the operation enabled the release of the Coast Guard vessels and successfully brought S-19 from her perch on the rocks.

In the spring of 1928, Acushnet cleared the sea lanes of two menaces to navigation. The first consisted of the wreckage of a wooden ship which she picked up some 5 miles south of the Northeast Light vessel at the entrance to Delaware Bay and towed inside the Delaware breakwater where the Lewes, Delaware, station crew beached it. The second was another mass of wreckage (possibly from the same vessel) in the same general area which she handled in the same manner as she had used with the first. The following November, the Coast Guard destroyer USCGD Henley spotted a derelict – the floating derrick Van Frank No. 2 and turned it over to Acushnet, which towed it into Sandy Hook Bay and secured it on 10 November 1928. Ironically, the same ships picked up the same derelict exactly one year later, on 10 November 1929, merely repeating the procedure.

On 15 January 1932, the steamship Lemuel Burrows, while en route from Boston to Newport News, Virginia, rammed the Coast Guard destroyer Herndon as the latter steamed on patrol off the fog-bound coast, some 50 miles (80 km) southwest of Montauk Point. Due to the fog and to the fact that Herndon's radio transmitters had been rendered inoperative by the collision, the destroyer's identity remained a mystery until the repairs to her transmitters enabled her to transmit distress signals within a half-hour of the collision. Upon receipt of word of Herndon's plight, Acushnet departed her base at Woods Hole and sped to the scene to render assistance. By the time she arrived in the vicinity, a boat from Lemuel Burrows had located Herndon in the pea-soup fog, and the former had taken the latter under tow. Acushnet then took over the towing duties from the merchantman and brought the disabled destroyer into Boston for repairs.

On 28 February 1932, the American schooner George W. Elzey Jr. collided with Acushnet in the Atlantic Ocean off the Cross Rip Lightship and sank. The schooner's crew was rescued.

Acushnet's Coast Guard days were numbered. Toward the middle of the 1930s, the Navy had perceived a pressing need for tugs and turned to the Coast Guard for help until new construction could fill the gap. As a result, the Coast Guard delivered Acushnet to the Navy at the Norfolk Navy Yard on 30 May 1936. During the ensuing two months, the ship was fitted out for naval service; and, on 1 September 1936, Acushnet – classified as an oceangoing tug and designated AT-63 – was commissioned.

== U.S. Navy service, 1936–45 ==
Over the next five years, USS Acushnet operated in the 5th Naval District, operating primarily between the Norfolk Navy Yard at Portsmouth, the Naval Operating Base (NOB), Norfolk, and such ports as Yorktown, Va., Dahlgren, Va., and Indian Head, Md., as well as Washington, D.C., Baltimore and Annapolis, Md., towing barges and lighters within the confines of the 5th Naval District. Besides her routine towing voyages up and down the Potomac and into the Tidewater regions, Acushnet performed other duties as required. She towed a cargo of condemned ammunition from the naval ammunition depot at St. Julien's Creek Annex, to the 100-fathom (180 m) curve off the Southern Drill Grounds and dumped it on the night of 5 October 1939; she towed targets for the battle practices of the heavy cruisers San Francisco (CA-38) and Quincy (CA-39) on 7 and 8 November 1939; she pulled ex-Nereus (AC-10) to her lay-up berth in the James River, in the "Ship Graveyard" off Fort Eustis, on 13 November 1939; and towed targets for the new destroyers USS Morris (DD-417) and Gleaves (DD-423) between 18 and 21 November 1940.

Acushnet's, duties changed little after the United States entered World War II. She continued her operations in the Chesapeake Bay region, touching at points on the Potomac River and along the Maryland and Virginia coasts, as before. Acushnet remained attached to the 5th Naval District until June 1944, when she was temporarily assigned duties in the Panama Sea Frontier. Shortly before this change of station, the ship was reclassified an "oceangoing tug, old," and redesignated ATO-63.

Departing Norfolk on 28 June 1944, Acushnet reached Balboa, Panama Canal Zone, on 13 July, via Havana, Cuba, and operated under the auspices of the Panama Sea Frontier until returning to Norfolk on 11 August 1944.

Shortly after resuming her operations in the Tidewater area, Acushnet was returning from the Southern Drill Grounds during heavy weather on the evening of 13 September 1944 with target raft no. 67 in tow, when the latter drifted and damaged the tug's rudder to such an extent that Acushnet had to be taken in tow by the destroyer escort, Clarence L. Evans (DE-113). Sciota (ATO-30) took over the tow from the destroyer escort soon thereafter.

However, by 10:00 on the following morning, the storm had attained hurricane force, and by 01:00 on the 15th the wind had reached 95 knots (176 km/h). Target raft no. 67 soon parted company from Acushnet and ran aground. Later, as the wind and seas diminished, the Coast Guard tug USCGC Carrabasset (ATCG-1) took over towing the venerable Acushnet and brought her safely to Norfolk. The tug underwent repairs at Norfolk for the next two weeks and then resumed her towing duties on the Potomac River and in the Chesapeake Bay region.

Acushnet thus spent the remainder of World War II operating in the 5th Naval District, indeed as she had done throughout her career in the Navy. However, because of the construction of a new generation of powerful fleet tugs, there was no place in the postwar Navy for such veterans as Acushnet. Declared surplus to Navy needs on 20 September 1945, Acushnet was decommissioned at the Coast Guard Yard, Berkeley, Va., on 14 December 1945. Struck from the Naval Vessel Register on 8 January 1946, Acushnet was transferred to the Maritime Commission for disposal on 12 December 1946.
