= Isthmian Canal Commission of 1899 =

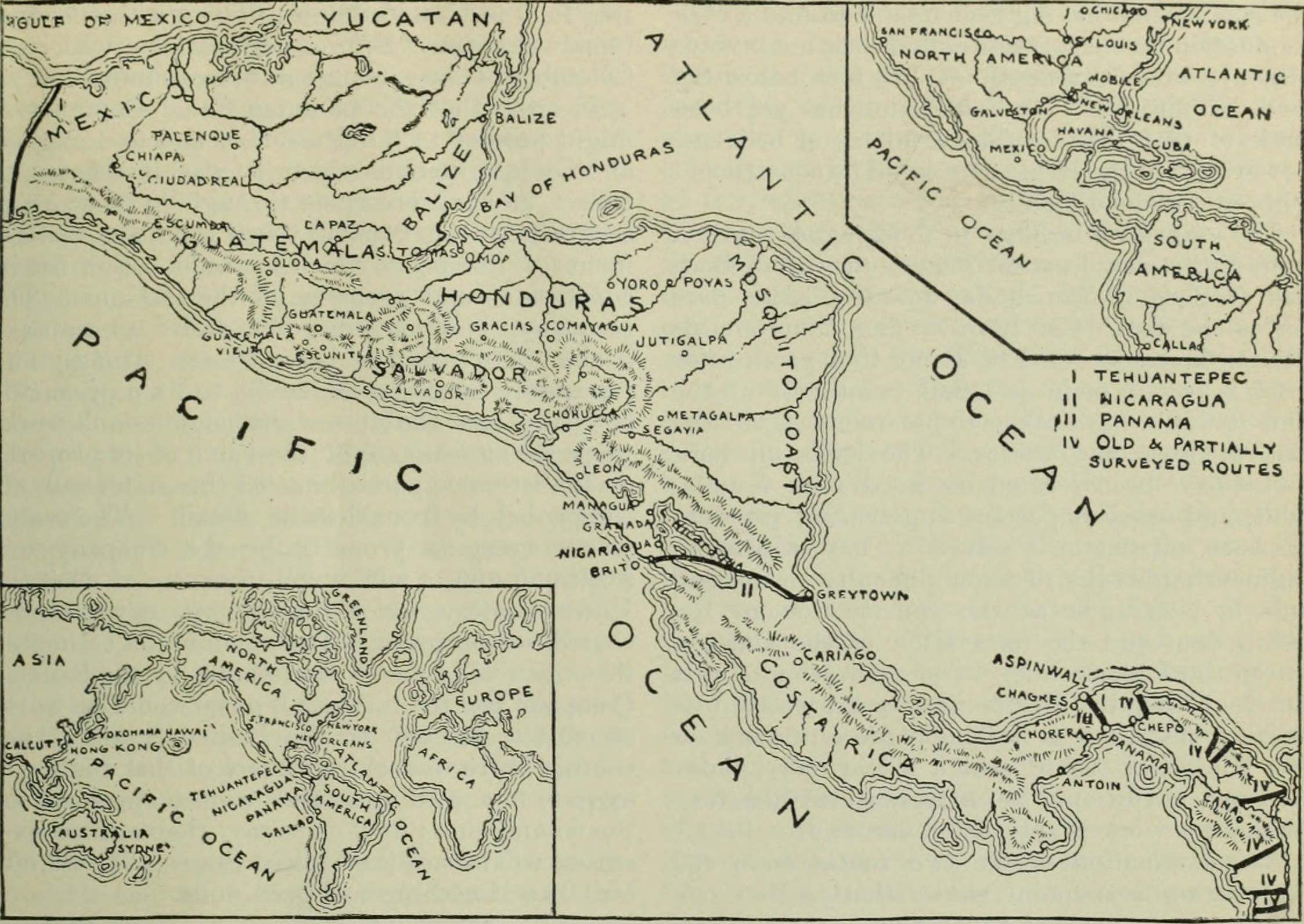
Map showing various routes considered by the Commission

The Isthmian Canal Commission was a commission created by the United States Congress in 1899 "to determine the most feasible and practicable route" in Central America to build a canal. The American commission was chaired by John G. Walker, even though he chaired a previous congressional commission called the Nicaragua Canal Commission, which had not yet issued its final report. That commission released its report in mid-1899 and, true to its name, recommended the locale of Nicaragua for the construction of a canal. This change of focus was a triumph for the lobbyist William Nelson Cromwell, who was hired by French interests wanting to dispose of the assets of the failed enterprise of Ferdinand de Lesseps.

The commission issued its report on 16 November 1901, recommending once again Nicaragua, disregarding Panama because La Compagnie Nouvelle du Canal de Panama—the company under which the French assets were organized—charged over $109 million for everything, which Walker found much too high. After some further lobbying by Cromwell and also Philippe Bunau-Varilla, the company lowered the price to $40 million on 4 January 1902. The Commission hastily reconvened on Theodore Roosevelt's urging to reconsider the question, after which Panama was declared the preferred route.
