= Rising Tides =

2011 book by Taylor Anderson

Maelstrom
- First edition
- Author: Taylor Anderson
- Cover artist: Studio Liddell
- Language: English
- Series: Destroyermen
- Genre: Alternate history
- Publisher: Roc Books
- Publication date: 2011
- Publication place: United States
- Media type: Print
- Pages: 433
- ISBN: 978-0-451-46388-3
- OCLC: 617551209
- Preceded by: Distant Thunders
- Followed by: Firestorm

Rising Tides is the fifth book of the Destroyermen series of alternate history novels by Taylor Anderson.

== Plot synopsis ==
Captain Mathew Reddy takes his ship and crew to Hawaii and facing other humans in that region. Younger officers are given increasing responsibility and deal with the consequences of their decisions. Lt. Sandra Tucker fights to keep a band of refugees, including a princess, alive and moving to safety.

== Literary significance and reception ==
The reviewer for SFRevu wrote that "the majesty and mystery of the Destroyermen series continues in the fifth entrant in the series, Rising Tides" and "this volume brought back the spirit of adventure and exploration that had been lost to nonstop warfare in the past few books". The reviewer for Publishers Weekly wrote that "Anderson continues to broaden the scope of the story, but never lets the philosophy drown out the action".
