= Maelstrom (Anderson novel) =

Book by Taylor Anderson

- First edition
- Author: Taylor Anderson
- Cover artist: Studio Liddell
- Language: English
- Series: Destroyermen
- Genre: Alternate history
- Publisher: Roc Books
- Publication date: 2009
- Publication place: United States
- Media type: Print
- Pages: 387
- ISBN: 978-0-451-46253-4
- OCLC: 233548907
- Preceded by: Crusade
- Followed by: Distant Thunders

Maelstrom is the third book of the Destroyermen series by author Taylor Anderson.

== Plot synopsis ==
Captain Matthew Reddy's ship Walker, and his Lemurian allies, have won several battles against the cannibalistic lizard race, the Grik, who are waging a war of genocide against the sea-going Lemurians. The Grik sent a large force of 500 ships carrying 150,000-200,000 soldiers to destroy the Captain's crew and base at Baalkpaan. The Japanese heavy cruiser, the Amagi, will be supporting the Grik lizard army.
