= USS Mahan (DD-102) =

Wickes-class destroyer

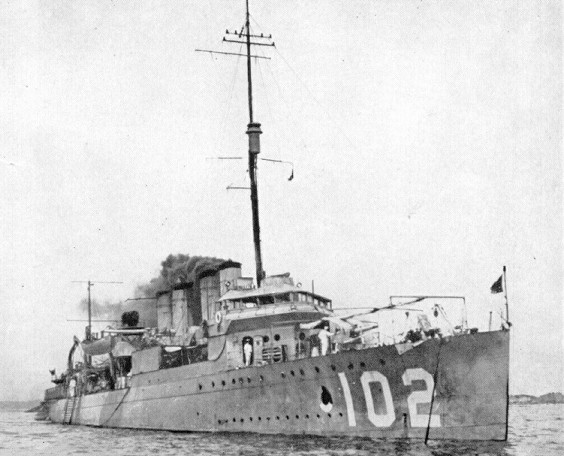
- USS Mahan, DD-102

History

United States
- Name: Mahan
- Namesake: Alfred Thayer Mahan
- Builder: Fore River Shipyard, Quincy, Massachusetts
- Laid down: 4 May 1918
- Launched: 4 August 1918
- Commissioned: 24 October 1918
- Decommissioned: 1 May 1920
- Reclassified: Light minelayer, DM-7, 17 July 1920
- Stricken: 22 October 1930
- Fate: Sold for scrap, 17 January 1931

General characteristics
- Class & type: Wickes-class destroyer
- Displacement: 1,060 tons
- Length: 314 ft 5 in (95.83 m)
- Beam: 30 ft 11 in (9.42 m)
- Draft: 8 ft 6 in (2.59 m)
- Speed: 35 knots (65 km/h; 40 mph)
- Complement: 133 officers and enlisted
- Armament: 4 × 4 in (102 mm)/50 guns; 2 × 1-pounder guns; 12 × 21 inch (533 mm) torpedo tubes

USS Mahan (DD-102) was a Wickes-class destroyer built for the United States Navy. Commissioned in 1918, Mahan was a flush deck destroyer, and the first ship to be named for Rear Admiral Alfred Thayer Mahan. Her main battery consisted of four 4-inch/50 caliber guns.

== Background ==
Norman Friedman, a naval historian, observed in U.S. Destroyers that the First World War ushered in a new aspect for American destroyer design; e.g. a significant need for a large number of ships. Specifically designed for speeds to match those of the fleet's new era of battlecruiser. The mass-produced destroyers that followed would have the same design speed of 35 knots (65 km/h; 40 mph) as the battlecruisers. Increased speed from 30 knots (56 km/h; 35 mph) to 35 knots required more than 90 tons of additional machinery, and modification of the hulls for greater efficiency. The ships would also be designed as a modified version of the 1916 Caldwell class destroyer.

== Design ==
=== General characteristics ===
USS Mahan (DD-102) was a Wickes-class destroyer built for the United States Navy by the Fore River Shipyard, Quincy, Massachusetts. The ship was named for Rear Admiral Alfred Thayer Mahan and laid down on 4 May 1918. She was launched on 4 August 1918, and sponsored by Miss Ellen K. Mahan, niece of Rear Admiral Mahan. The ship was commissioned on 24 October 1918 – less than one month prior to the end of the First World War. Mahan was decommissioned on 1 May 1920. (Note: After Mahan was decommissioned on 1 May 1920, she was reclassified on 17 May 1920 as a DM-7 minelayer. The ship was stricken from the Navy's Register on 22 October 1930, and was sold for scrap on 17 January 1931 to the Boston Iron & Metal Company of Baltimore, Maryland.)

Mahan was built with a flush deck; meaning she was designed without a raised forecastle. Mahan displaced 1,060 tons at the standard load. The ship's overall length was 314 feet 5 inches (95.8 m), the beam was 30 feet 11 inches (9.4 m) and her draft was 8 feet 6 inches (2.6 m). The ship's complement was 133 officers and enlisted men.

== Service history ==
After her shakedown cruise, Mahan operated off Cuba until May 1919. She then steamed to the Azores to become one of the guide ships for the transatlantic flights of the Navy flying boats: NC-1, NC-3, and NC-4. Mahan returned to Boston, Massachusetts, via Brest, France, on 21 June. She was converted into a light minelayer on 17 July 1920 and designated as DM-7.

With the exception of a cruise to Pearl Harbor for maneuvers in early 1925, Mahan operated along the United States East Coast, in the Caribbean Sea, and off the Panama Canal Zone for the next 10 years. During this time, the destroyer participated in fleet training exercises, and patrolled courses for the International Six Meter Sailing Races of 1922 and 1927. Mahan assisted in salvage operations for submarines S-51 in September 1925 off Block Island, and did so for S-4, periodically, from 17 December 1927 through mid-March 1928 off Provincetown, Massachusetts. Mahan conducted reserve-training cruises in the Caribbean Sea from 1928 to September 1929. Throughout the decade, in addition to her regular duties, Mahan served as an experimental ship testing new equipment for the Navy's future use.

== Fiction ==
USS Mahan was used in the Destroyermen series, written by Taylor Anderson. In the books, Mahan and her sister ship USS Walker are pursued by superior Japanese naval forces after the Battle of the Java Sea and seek refuge in a squall. The squall transports Mahan and Walker to an alternate earth, one where a different evolutionary path occurred. Anderson also uses other decommissioned and never-completed ships in the series: the U.S. Navy submarine USS S-19 and the Imperial Japanese Navy battlecruiser Amagi.
