= John Grimes Walker =

American Navy admiral (1835–1907)

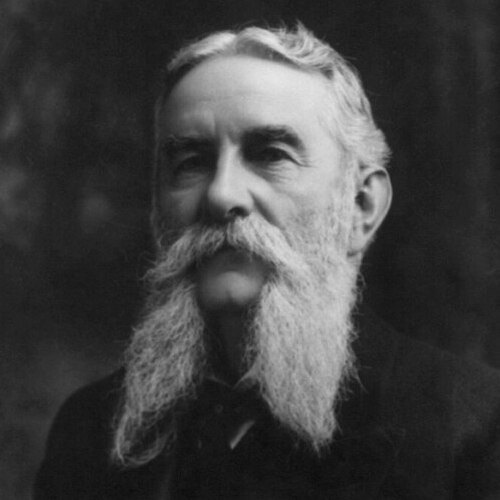
- Walker in 1904
- Born: March 20, 1835; Hillsborough, New Hampshire, U.S.
- Died: September 16, 1907 (aged 72); Ogunquit, Maine, U.S.
- Military career
- Allegiance: United States of America
- Branch: United States Navy
- Service years: 1850–1897
- Rank: Rear Admiral
- Commands: Baron DeKalb; Saco; Shawmut; Sabine; Powhatan; Bureau of Navigation; White Squadron; South Atlantic Squadron; North Atlantic Squadron; Pacific Squadron
- Conflicts: American Civil War

Signature
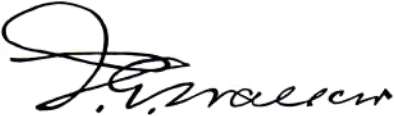

John Grimes Walker (March 20, 1835 – September 16, 1907) was an admiral in the United States Navy who served during the Civil War. After the war, he served as Chief of the Bureau of Navigation, head of the Lighthouse Board, and commander-in-chief of the Squadron of Evolution and of the North Atlantic Squadron. In retirement, he led commissions to investigate the construction of a Central American canal connecting the Atlantic and Pacific Oceans.

== Early life and career ==
Walker was born in Hillsborough, New Hampshire to Alden and Susan (Grimes) Walker. His mother, Susan, died Oct. 31, 1846 and is buried at the Church Street Cemetery, Hillsborough. His father, Alden, remarried, but young John Walker chose to live on the farm of his grandfather, John Grimes, in nearby Deering, until moving to Burlington, Iowa to live with his uncle, James W. Grimes, a successful attorney and rising politician, who stressed the need for a good education. His Uncle James Grimes was able to get nephew John G. Walker into the Naval Academy at Annapolis,MD in 1850. J.W. Grimes became Iowa's 3rd Governor in 1854, and serve as U.S. Senator representing Iowa from 1859 to 1869. John Walkers father, Alden, died in 1858 in Grafton, Vt., and is buried at the Village cemetery there.

Walker was appointed a midshipman on October 5, 1850, and graduated at the head of his class at the Naval Academy in 1856. His training at sea was aboard Portsmouth in the Pacific Squadron. After graduation, he served in Falmouth and St. Lawrence in 1858 and 1859; in Susquehanna in 1860 and 1861; in Connecticut in 1861; and in Winona in 1861 and 1862.

== Civil War service ==
Walker distinguished himself under David Dixon Porter during the Mississippi River campaigns while serving in Winona, Baron DeKalb (which he commanded), and Saco. He participated in the engagements with Forts Jackson and St. Philip, as well as the Chalmette batteries during the operations which resulted in the fall of New Orleans.

He later took part in the Navy's operations against Vicksburg. During the winter of 1862 and 1863, Walker participated in the thrusts against Haines Bluff and Arkansas Post. He also took part in the Yazoo Pass Expedition, the attack on Fort Pemberton, and the capture of Yazoo City.

At the siege of Vicksburg, Walker commanded the naval gun battery attached to the 15th Army Corps. His subsequent war service included operations which resulted in the capture of Fort Fisher, and he participated in the ensuing bombardments of Forts Anderson and Caswell on the Cape Fear River and in the capture of Wilmington, North Carolina. From 1864 to 1865, he commanded the steam gunboat Saco in the North Atlantic Blockading Squadron.

== Post-Civil War service ==
From 1865 to 1866, Walker commanded the steamer Shawmut in the Brazil Squadron. Promoted to commander in July 1866, he served as Assistant Superintendent of the Naval Academy from 1866 to 1869. After commanding Sabine in 1869 and 1870—during which time he took the ship to Europe on a midshipman training cruise—Walker served as secretary to the Lighthouse Board from 1873 to 1878. Promoted to captain in June 1877, he commanded the sidewheel steam frigate Powhatan on North Atlantic Station in 1881.

From 1881 to 1889, Walker held the post of Chief of the Bureau of Navigation. Created in 1882, the Office of Naval Intelligence (ONI), directed its reports to the Chief of the Bureau of Navigation until 1889 when it was seconded to the assistant secretary of the navy's office.

Walker was the subject of a feature article in the September 12, 1891 edition of The New York Times. The article detailed how, as Chief of the Bureau of Navigation Walker gave senior officers assignments beneath their abilities in hopes that they would retire from the Navy sooner and, thereby, enable Walker to get promoted faster.

== Flag assignments ==
Promoted to commodore in February 1889, Walker went to sea as an acting rear admiral commanding the Squadron of Evolution (or "White Squadron"), with his flag in Chicago. In 1890, he assumed command of the South Atlantic Squadron. From September 1892 to June 1893, Walker served as commander-in-chief of the North Atlantic Squadron. From 1893 to 1894, he was a member of the Board of Inspection and Survey.

Appointed permanent rear admiral in January 1894, Walker briefly served as commander of the Pacific Squadron from April to August 1894. In 1895, he took the White Squadron to Hawaii when a coup d'etat posed a threat to American interests. He received a commendation for his attitude of watchful waiting and his squadron's posture of readiness to respond to a possible emergency.

Upon his return to shore duty in 1896, he headed the Lighthouse Board and concurrently chaired the committee investigating locations for deep-water harbors in southern California.

== Post-Navy activities ==
In 1866, Walker married Rebecca White Pickering, daughter of Henry White Pickering of Boston and Salem, Massachusetts. They had seven children, including Susan Walker Fitzgerald.

Soon after retiring as a rear admiral in 1897, Walker was chosen to serve as President of the Nicaragua Canal Commission. Two years later, in 1899, he was appointed President of the congressional Isthmian Canal Commission to look into possible routes for a canal across the Central American isthmus.

Admiral Walker was a veteran companion of the Military Order of the Loyal Legion of the United States and the Naval Order of the United States. He was also a hereditary companion of the Military Order of Foreign Wars.

Rear Admiral Walker died at the age of 72, at Ogunquit, Maine. His remains were cremated and then interred at Arlington National Cemetery with full military honors on September 21, 1907.

== Namesakes ==
Two destroyers have been named USS Walker in his honor.

== Dates of rank ==
- Acting midshipman – 5 October 1850
- Midshipman – 11 December 1852
- Passed midshipman – 20 June 1856
- Master – 22 January 1858
- Lieutenant – 23 January 1858
- Lieutenant commander – 16 July 1862
- Commander – 25 July 1866
- Captain – 25 June 1877
- Commodore – 12 February 1889
- Rear admiral – 23 January 1894
- Retired list – 20 March 1897

== Gallery ==
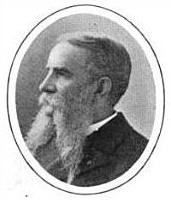

Military offices
Preceded by Bancroft Gherardi	Commander-in-Chief, North Atlantic Squadron; 10 September 1892–June 1893	Succeeded by Andrew E. K. Benham
