= USS Shawmut (1863) =

Gunboat of the United States Navy

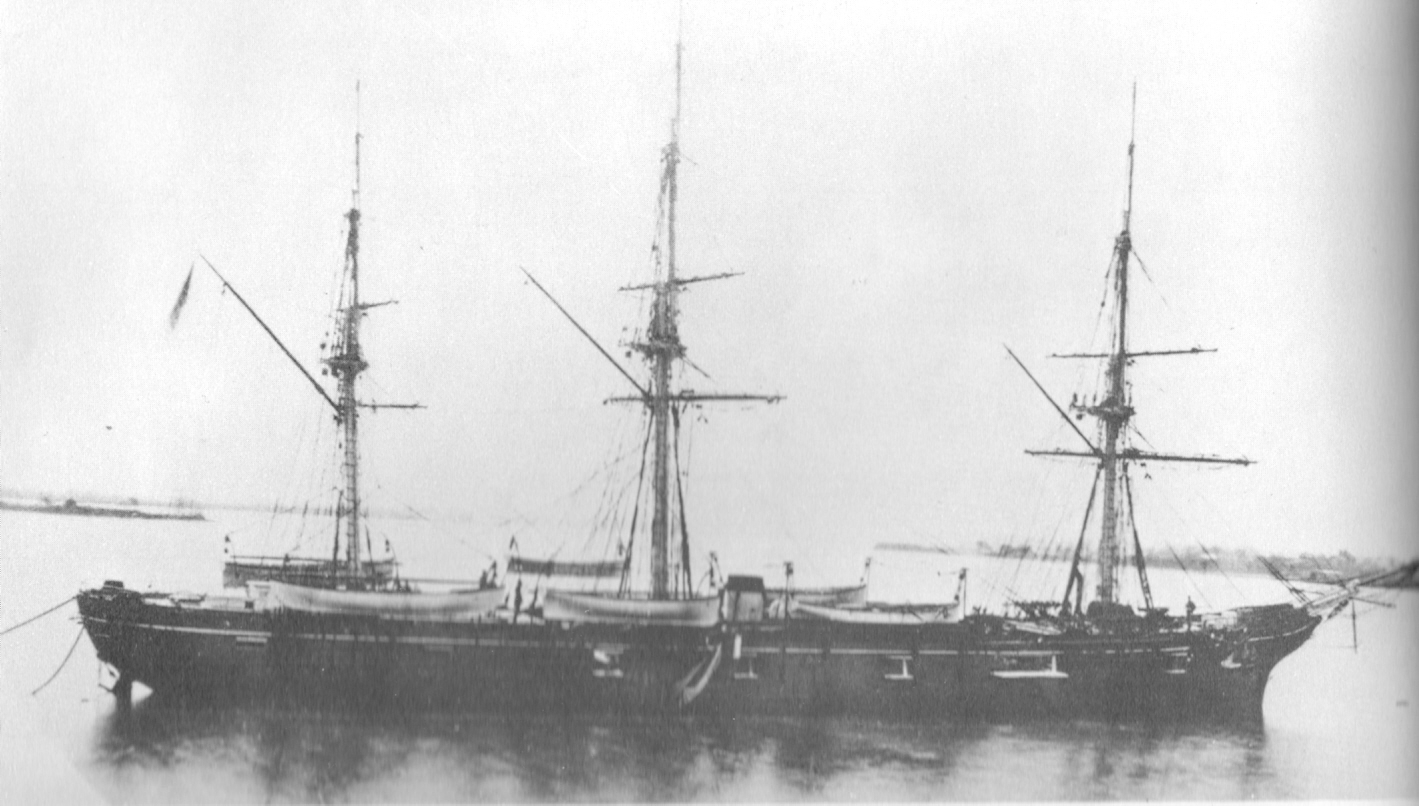
- USS Shawmut in the Potomac River

History

United States
- Laid down: 2 February 1863
- Launched: 17 April 1863; at the Portsmouth Navy Yard
- Acquired: 16 October 1864; at New York City
- Commissioned: on 1 November 1864; at the New York Navy Yard
- Decommissioned: circa 22 January 1877; at the Norfolk Navy Yard
- Stricken: 1877 (est.)
- Fate: Sold, 27 September 1877

General characteristics
- Displacement: 593 tons
- Length: 179 ft 6 in (54.71 m)
- Beam: 30 ft 0 in (9.14 m)
- Draught: not known
- Propulsion: steam engine; screw-propelled
- Speed: 11 knots
- Complement: 35
- Armament: one 100-pounder Parrott rifle; two 9" Dahlgren smoothbores; one 30-pounder Parrott rifle; two 24-pounder howitzers; two 12-pounder rifles

USS Shawmut was a 593-ton steamer acquired by the U.S. Navy and put to use by the Union during the American Civil War.

Shawmut served the Union Navy primarily as a gunboat with howitzers for bombardment, and various other rifles and cannon for use at sea in apprehending blockade runners attempting to "run" the Union blockade of the Confederate States of America.

== Built in Maine in 1863 ==
Shawmut—a screw gunboat begun on 2 February 1863 by the Portsmouth Navy Yard (Kittery, Maine) -- was launched on 17 April 1863; sponsored by Miss Lucy Hall; departed Portsmouth, New Hampshire, on 20 October 1863; was towed to New York City where her engine and machinery were installed by the South Brooklyn Works; was delivered to the Union Navy on 16 October 1864; and commissioned at the New York Navy Yard on 1 November 1864, Lt. Comdr. George U. Morris in command.

== Civil War service ==
=== Searching for CSS Tallahassee ===
Two days later, Shawmut got underway to search for Confederate Navy commerce raider, CSS Tallahassee (renamed Olustee), which had recently preyed upon Northern shipping off the Delaware capes. After cruising in Nova Scotian waters without seeing or hearing of her quarry, Shawmut returned to the Portsmouth Navy Yard on the 20th.

On 9 January 1865, the gunboat was ordered to proceed to Wilmington, North Carolina, to join the North Atlantic Blockading Squadron. She participated in the attack on and capture of Fort Anderson, North Carolina, from 18 to 20 February. On the latter day, a boat from Shawmut was destroyed by a torpedo (the Civil War term for a mine) as it swept waters in the area.

=== Supporting Grant on the York River ===
In March, as General Ulysses S. Grant's operations around Richmond, Virginia, approached their climax, Shawmut was called back to Hampton Roads, Virginia, and stationed in the York River "to keep open free navigation between White House and the mouth of the York River." With the fall of Richmond and General Robert E. Lee's surrender, Shawmut was ordered north and decommissioned at the New York Navy Yard on 17 April 1865.

== Post-Civil War service ==
=== Assigned to the Brazil station ===
Refitted for foreign service, the gunboat was recommissioned on 15 June 1865 and soon sailed for Bahia, Brazil. Following over a year's service on the Brazil Station protecting "our flag from insult and the property of our citizens from unlawful seizure," Shawmut returned home and was decommissioned at the New York Navy Yard on 8 December 1866.

Recommissioned on 12 August 1867, Shawmut served in the North Atlantic Squadron until she was laid up again at New York City on 7 July 1868. Reactivated once more on 18 March 1871, the ship resumed service in the North Atlantic and served along the Atlantic seaboard until finally laid up at the Norfolk Navy Yard on 22 January 1877.

== Final decommissioning and sale ==
She was sold on 27 September to E. Stannard & Co., Westbrook, Connecticut.
