= USS Walker (DD-163) =

Wickes-class destroyer

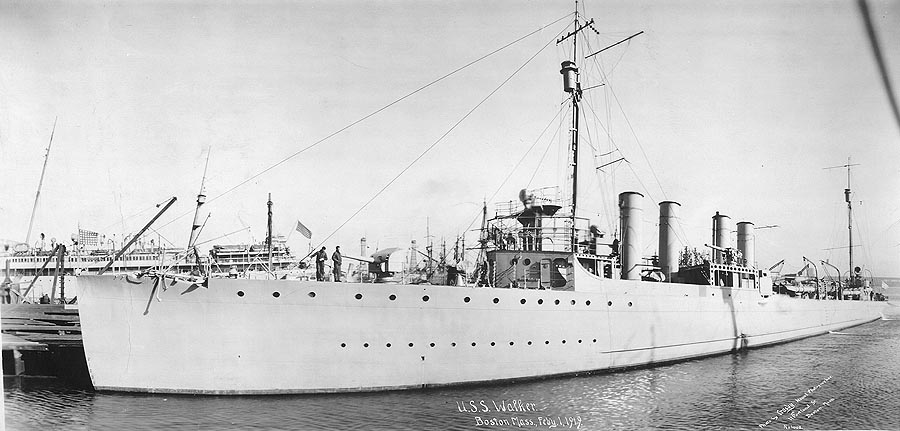
- USS Walker at Boston on 1 February 1919

History

United States
- Name: Walker
- Namesake: John Grimes Walker
- Builder: Fore River Shipyard, Quincy, Massachusetts
- Laid down: 19 June 1918
- Launched: 14 September 1918
- Commissioned: 31 January 1919
- Decommissioned: 7 June 1922
- Reclassified: YW-57, 1 April 1939; DCH-1, 11 July 1940; IX-44, 17 February 1941
- Stricken: 24 June 1942
- Fate: Scuttled, 28 December 1941

General characteristics
- Class & type: Wickes-class destroyer
- Displacement: 1,284 tons
- Length: 314 ft 4 1/2 in (95.8 m)
- Beam: 30 ft 11 in (9.4 m)
- Draft: 9 ft 2 in (2.8 m)
- Speed: 35 knots (65 km/h)
- Complement: 101 officers and enlisted
- Armament: 4 × 4 in (102 mm) guns; 2 × 3 in (76 mm) guns; 12 × 21 in (533 mm) torpedo tubes

The first USS Walker (DD-163) was a Wickes-class destroyer that saw service in the United States Navy during World War I. She was named for Admiral John Grimes Walker.

== History ==
Walker was laid down on 19 June 1918 at Quincy, Massachusetts, by the Fore River Shipbuilding Company under contract from Bethlehem Steel Co. The destroyer was launched on 14 September 1918, sponsored by Mrs. Francis Pickering Thomas. Walker was commissioned at the Boston Navy Yard on 31 January 1919.

Walker got underway on 20 February to rendezvous with the transport George Washington as it returned from France with President Woodrow Wilson. Upon completion of this duty, the new destroyer returned to Boston, where she was soon assigned to Division 18, Destroyer Force. She proceeded to Newport, Rhode Island, and loaded her full allotment of torpedoes at the Naval Torpedo Station. She sailed for the West Indies on 6 March and, soon after her arrival in the Caribbean fell into the Fleet's regular schedule of exercises and maneuvers. Walker conducted tactical exercises off San Juan, Puerto Rico, and gunnery exercises out of Guantanamo Bay, Cuba, into the late winter of 1919 and early spring of 1920 before she headed north.

After steaming into New York Harbor on 14 April, the destroyer was sent to her base at Newport. Early the next month, she supported the Navy's NC-boat transatlantic flights. Initially stationed at Trepassey Bay from 6 May to 8 May, she later operated at sea from 10 to 17 May, serving as one of the chain of picket ships to provide the NC flying boats with position reports and bearings. When this mission was completed, she returned to Newport on 20 May.

Her next port of call was Annapolis, Maryland, in early June for a two-day visit during Naval Academy graduation exercises, after which Walker headed south and transited the Panama Canal on 24 July. She called briefly at Acapulco, Mexico, for two days before steaming for southern California, arriving at Coronado on 8 August.

Based at San Diego, Walker conducted local operations off the United States West Coast into late 1920, when she was assigned to the Reserve Destroyer Flotilla. She embarked naval reservists for an indoctrination cruise on 27 October 1920 and remained in "rotating reserve" duty, conducting periodic target practices, full-power runs, and undergoing overhauls at the Mare Island Navy Yard. Decommissioned on 7 June 1922, as part of an austerity program, Walker was placed in reserve at San Diego, where she remained into the 1930s.

Schematic profile view of USS Walker as-built in 1920

After 16 years in reserve the ship was struck from the Navy list on 28 March 1938 and slated for disposal by sale. Logistics requirements of U.S. West Coast naval districts, however, resulted in the former destroyer being placed back on the list and earmarked for conversion to a water barge. Redesignated YW-57 on 1 April 1939, the ship was undergoing conversion at the Mare Island Navy Yard when the Navy again decided to change the vessel's role. With the outbreak of war in Europe and the possibility of American involvement in the conflict, the ship was slated for use as a damage control hulk.

== Fate ==
Designated as the damage control hulk DCH-1 on 11 July 1940, the vessel was based at the Destroyer Base, San Diego, and used for training exercises in formulating and evolving new damage control techniques. In the following year, as the Pacific Fleet's base had been moved from San Diego to Pearl Harbor, plans were made to tow DCH-1 (which had been stripped of propulsion machinery during the initial conversion work to YW-57) to the Hawaiian Islands. She was re-designated as IX-44 on 17 February 1941. On 28 December 1941, while being towed from San Diego, California, to Pearl Harbor, by the oiler USS Neches, DCH-1 was cast adrift and scuttled by gunfire from Neches at 26°35′N 143°49′W.

== Fiction ==
USS Walker was used in the Destroyermen series by Taylor Anderson. In the books, Walker and her sister ship USS Mahan are pursued by superior Japanese naval forces after the Battle of the Java Sea and seek refuge in a squall. The squall transports Walker and Mahan to an alternate earth, one where a different evolutionary path occurred. Anderson also uses other decommissioned ships in the series: USS S-19 and the Japanese battlecruiser Amagi.

Walker also appears in the seventh mission of the campaign of the video game Battlestations Midway, although she is shown as a Clemson class destroyer rather than a Wickes class.
