= Hamazakibashi Junction =

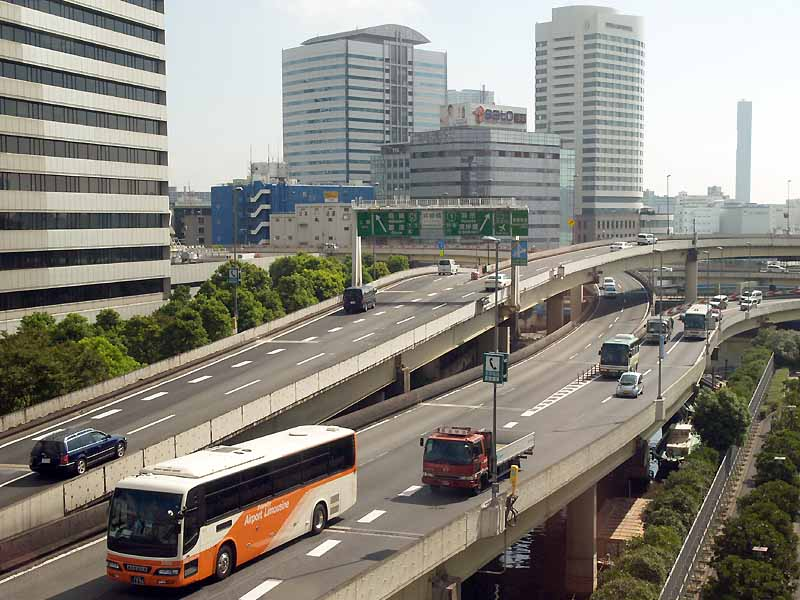
- Interactive map of Hamazakibashi Junction

Location
- Kaigan, Minato, Tokyo
- Coordinates: 35°39′12″N 139°45′35″E

Construction

Hamazakibashi Junction (浜崎橋ジャンクション, Hamazakibashi Jankushon) is a junction on the Shuto Expressway on the coast of Kaigan, Minato, Tokyo.

The overpass is along the coastal street (prefectural road 316) on the ground. Hamazakibashi exists as a bridge over the Shibuya River on the coastal street.

TBS TV has installed a "Hamazakibashi Weather Camera" on the roof of the building overlooking the downside.

Those who enter this junction from the inner loop of the city center loop line, then follow the main road, they exit the city center loop line and enter the Haneda Route, so those who want to continue driving on the city center loop line (towards Ginza / Edobashi) In that case, they have to go off the main line and proceed to the left branch.

== Traffic jam ==
Hamazakibashi JCT uphill was once one of the most congested points on the Shuto Expressway. In addition to the traffic concentration from the No. 11 Daiba Route and the Metropolitan Expressway No. 1 Haneda Route, the section between Shibaura JCT and Hamazakibashi JCT 500 meters becomes a lane change section that goes to either the outer loop or the inner loop of the city center loop line, and intersects so that cars can weave in "Weaving traffic" occurs. With the opening of the Central Circular Route in March 2015, traffic congestion has been almost eliminated.
