= THK =

THK may refer to:

- THK Co., Ltd., a Japanese machinery components manufacturing and engineering company
- Tōkai Television Broadcasting, a TV station in Nagoya, Japan
- Türk Hava Kurumu, the Turkish Aeronautical Association, builder of a number of glider and aircraft types
- Türk Hava Kuvvetleri, the Turkish Air Force
