= Haneda Route =

Expressway in the Tokyo area

Shuto Expressway Haneda Route 首都高速1号羽田線

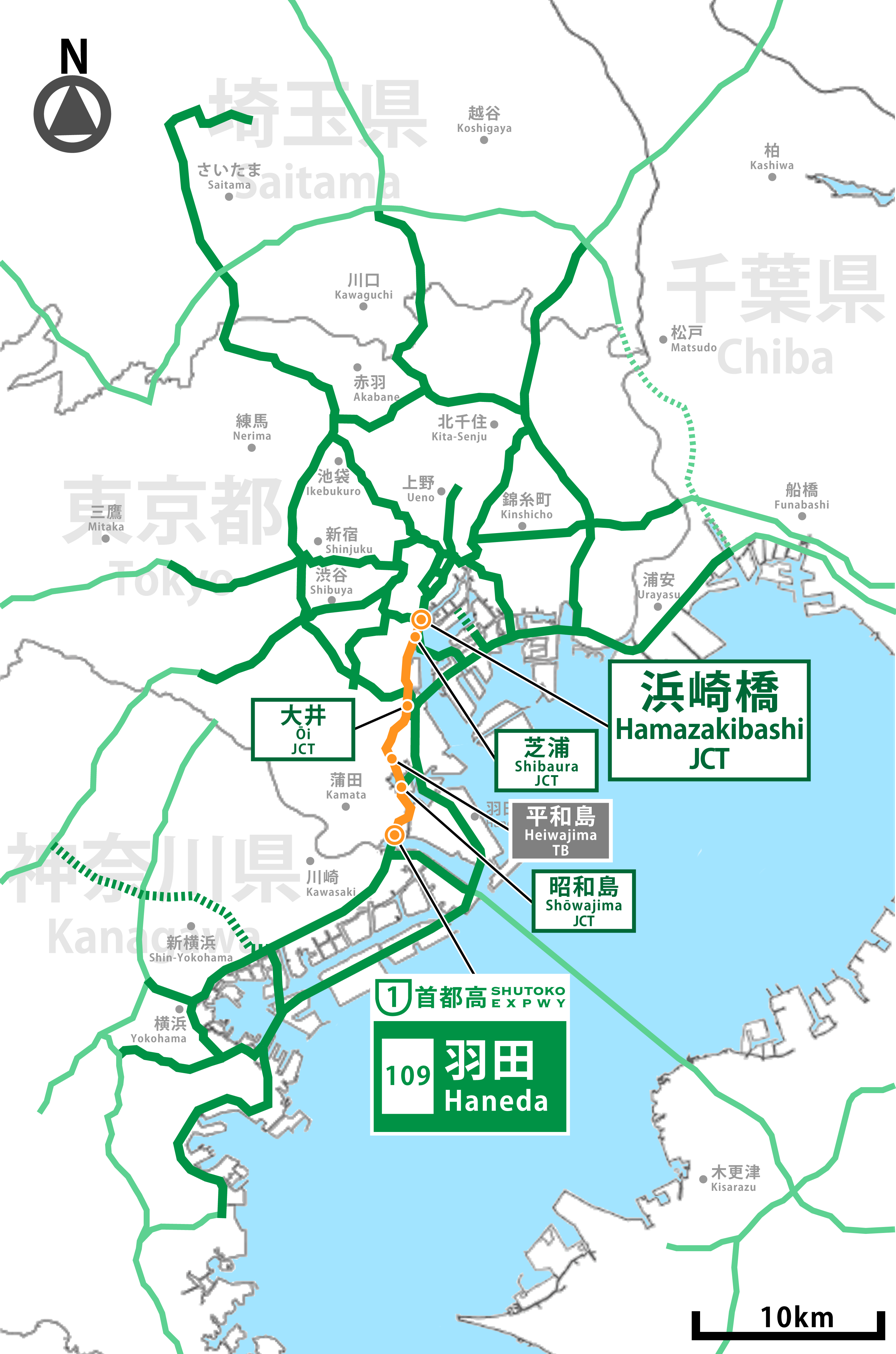

Route information
- Maintained by Metropolitan Expressway Company Limited
- Length: 12.5 km (7.8 mi)
- Existed: 1963–present

Major junctions
- North end: Hamazakibashi Junction in Minato, Tokyo; Inner Circular Route
- South end: Haneda entrance/exit in Ōta, Tokyo; Yokohane Route

Location
- Country: Japan

Highway system
- National highways of Japan; Expressways of Japan

The Haneda Route (羽田線, Haneda-sen), signed as Route 1, is one of the tolled routes of the Shuto Expressway system serving the Greater Tokyo Area. It is one two expressways signed as Route 1 in the system, the other expressway signed as Route 1 is the Ueno Route. The route is a 13.8-kilometer (8.6 mi) long radial highway running south from the ward of Minato in central Tokyo to the ward of Ōta. It connects Tokyo's Inner Circular Route in central Tokyo to Haneda International Airport, one of the Tokyo area's two international airports, as well as the Yokohane Route, which leads to Kawasaki and Yokohama in Kanagawa Prefecture.

== History ==
The Haneda Route was opened in four stages during the 1960s. The first section of the Haneda Route between Hamazakibashi and Shibaura was opened to traffic on 20 December 1962. The second section to be completed between Shibaura and Suzugamori was finished on 21 December 1963. The third section between Suzugamori and Haneda-nishi was opened on 2 August 1964. The fourth and final section between Haneda-nishi and Haneda was opened on 21 December 1966.

== Junction list ==
Exit number	Exit/interchange name	Connecting line name	Km from start	Notes	Municipality
-	Hamazakibashi JCT	Route C1 Outer Loop to Shibuya and Shinjuku Route C1 Inner Loop to Ginza and Hakozaki	0.0		Minato-ku
-	Shibaura JCT	Route 11 to Kuko-chuo (Haneda Airport) and Bayshore Route via Rainbow Bridge	0.5	Ginza/Shinjuku area connection	Minato-ku
101	Shibaura	Tokyo Metropolitan Road No. 316	1.7	Ginza/Shinjuku area entrance/exit	Minato-ku
102	Shibaura	Tokyo Metropolitan Road No. 316	1.7	Haneda/Yokohama area entrance/exit	Minato-ku
-	Ōi JCT	Gulf Line	5.5	To inbound from Bayshore Route only	Shinagawa-ku
103	Katsushima	Tokyo Metropolitan Road No. 316	6.9	Inbound exit/outbound entrance	Shinagawa-ku
104	Suzugamori	National Route 15	7.5	Outbound exit/inbound entrance	Shinagawa-ku
105	Heiwajima	Kannana-dori (Tokyo's #7 ring road)	9.1	Ginza/Shinjuku area entrance/exit	Ota-ku
-	Heiwajima parking	-			Ota-ku
-	~~Heiwajima tollbooth~~	-		Closed May 20, 2018	Ota-ku
106	Heiwajima		9.1	Daishi/Yokohama area entrance/exit	Ota-ku
-	Showajima JCT	Bayshore Route to Urayasu and Higashi-Kanto Expressway	9.7	Haneda/Yokohama Park area connection	Ota-ku
-	Haneda Tunnel	-		Vehicles with dangerous goods prohibited	Ota-ku
107	Kuko-nishi	Haneda Airport (West Entrance)	11.3	Ginza/Higashi Kanto area entrance/exit	Ota-ku
109	Haneda	Kampachi-dori (Tokyo's #8 ring road)	12.5	Entrance to Tokyo	Ota-ku
150	Haneda	Kampachi-dori (Tokyo's #8 ring road)	12.5	Yokohama area entrance	Ota-ku
