= Inner Circular Route =

Expressway in the Tokyo area

Shuto Expressway Inner Circular Route 首都高速都心環状線
- The Inner Circular Route highlighted in red

Route information
- Part of AH1
- Maintained by Metropolitan Expressway Company Limited
- Length: 14.8 km (9.2 mi)
- Existed: 1962–present

Major junctions
- Beltway around Tokyo
- Ueno Route; Mukojima Route; Tokyo Expressway; Yaesu Route; Haneda Route; Meguro Route; Shibuya Route; Shinjuku Route; Ikebukuro Route

Location
- Country: Japan

Highway system
- National highways of Japan; Expressways of Japan

The Inner Circular Route (都心環状線, Toshin Kanjō-sen), signed as Route C1, is one of the routes of the Shuto Expressway system serving the central part of the Greater Tokyo Area. The route is a complete loop around the central Tokyo wards of Chiyoda, Chūō, and Minato, with a total length of 14.8 kilometers (9.2 mi). In addition to serving areas of central Tokyo, the Inner Circular Route also serves as the origin of the radial routes of the Shuto Expressway. A section of the expressway is built above the Shibuya River.

== History ==
The expressway was built between 1962 and 1967, partly in preparation for the 1964 Summer Olympics. In 2009, Tokyo private industries proposed funding a project to dismantle the elevated expressway and put them underground.

In May 2020, the Shuto Expressway Company received approval for plans to relocate 1.8 kilometers of the expressway underground between Kandabashi and Edobashi Junctions, in the area surrounding Nihonbashi Bridge as part of larger project to redevelop the financial district. Construction commenced with the permanent closure of the Edobashi and Gofukubashi entrance and exit ramps on 10 May 2021. Construction on the replacement tunnel is expected to be completed in 2035, making way for the removal of the bridge planned to be completed in 2040.

== List of interchanges ==
List of interchanges ordered clockwise beginning with Edobashi Junction. The entire expressway is in Tokyo.

Location	km	mi	Exit	Name	Destinations	Notes
Chūō	0.0	0.0	—	Edobashi	Ueno Route north – Ueno; Mukojima Route north – Narita, Bayshore Route, Fukagawa Route, Tōhoku Expressway, Keiyō Road	Clockwise entrance, counterclockwise exit; distance posts reset to zero, eastern terminus of AH1
Chūō	0.8	0.50	11	Takarachō	Yaesu-dōri	Clockwise exit, counterclockwise entrance
Chūō	1.0	0.62	—	Kyōbashi	Spur route to Tokyo Expressway	Clockwise exit, counterclockwise entrance
Chūō	1.6	0.99	12	Kyōbashi	Kajibashi-dōri – Kyōbashi, Eitaibashi	Clockwise entrance, counterclockwise exit
Chūō	1.7– 1.9	1.1– 1.2	13/14	Shintomichō	Tokyo Metropolitan Route 50 (Shin-Ōhashi-dōri) – Shin-Ōhashi, Tsukuda, Shiodome	Exit only
Chūō	2.0– 2.5	1.2– 1.6	15/16	Ginza	Ginchū-dōri	
Chūō	3.2	2.0	18	Shiodome	Kaigan-dōri – Shinbashi	Clockwise entrance, counterclockwise exit
Chūō	3.4	2.1	—	Shiodome	Yaesu Route north – Kita-Ikebukuro, Shin-Kyōbashi	Clockwise entrance, counterclockwise exit
Minato	4.3	2.7	—	Hamazakibashi	Haneda Route south – Haneda, Bayshore Route, Yokohane Route, Daiba Route, Tokyo Bay Aqua-Line, Higashi-Kantō Expressway	
Minato	5.2– 5.7	3.2– 3.5	19/20	Shiba-kōen	Tokyo Metropolitan Route 319 – to National Route 1, Hibiya, Roppongi, Kanasugi Bridge, Shinagawa	
Minato	6.6	4.1	—	Ichinohashi	Meguro Route south – Meguro, Togoshi	
Minato	7.2	4.5	21	Iikura	Tokyo Metropolitan Route 415 (Azabu-dōri) – Roppongi	
Minato	7.8	4.8	—	Tanimachi	Shibuya Route west – to Tōmei Expressway, Shibuya	Clockwise beginning of AH1 concurrency
Chiyoda	8.8– 9.2	5.5– 5.7	23/24	Kasumigaseki	Tokyo Metropolitan Route 415 (Roppongi-dōri) – Hibiya, Hanzōmon, Nagatachō	
Chiyoda	10.2	6.3	—	Miyakezaka	Shinjuku Route west – to Chūō Expressway, Shinjuku	
Chiyoda	11.6	7.2	25	Daikanchō	Uchibori-dōri – Kitanomaru Park	Clockwise exit, counterclockwise entrance
Chiyoda	12.0	7.5	26	Kitanomaru	Uchibori-dōri – Hitotsubashi	Clockwise entrance, counterclockwise exit
Chiyoda	12.3	7.6	—	Takebashi	Ikebukuro Route north – Ōmiya, Kita-Ikebukuro	
Chiyoda	12.9– 13.2	8.0– 8.2	28/29	Kandabashi	Hibiya-dōri – Ōtemachi	
Chiyoda	13.3	8.3	—	Kandabashi	Yaesu Route south – Marunouchi, Shinbashi	Clockwise exit, counterclockwise entrance
Chūō	14.0	8.7	30	Gofukubashi	Tokyo Metropolitan Route 405 (Sotobori-dōri) – Tokyo Station	Closed on 10 May 2021; Clockwise entrance, counterclockwise exit
Chūō	14.2	8.8	31	Edobashi	Tokyo Metropolitan Route 316 (Shōwa-dōri)	Closed on 10 May 2021'; Clockwise exit, counterclockwise entrance
1.000 mi = 1.609 km; 1.000 km = 0.621 mi: Closed/former; Concurrency terminus; Incomplete access
