= Yaesu Route =

Road in Japan

Shuto Expressway Yaesu Route 首都高速八重洲線

Route information
- Maintained by Metropolitan Expressway Company Limited
- Length: 1.9 km (1.2 mi)

Location
- Country: Japan

Highway system
- National highways of Japan; Expressways of Japan

The Yaesu Route (八重洲線, Yaesu-sen), signed as Route Y, is one of the routes of the Shuto Expressway system in the Tokyo area. It connects the Inner Circular Route at Kandabashi Junction in Chiyoda Ward to the Tokyo Expressway at Nishi-ginza Junction in Chūō Ward. The expressway has a total length of 1.9 kilometers (1.2 mi). It primarily serves Tokyo Station and its surroundings. All large truck traffic is banned on this route.

== History ==
The Yaesu Route was completed in two phases. The first section of the expressway to be completed was the short section of expressway that links the southern end of the Tokyo Expressway to the Inner Circular Route in 1964. The main part of the expressway between Kandabashi and Nishi-Ginza was completed in 1973.

== List of interchanges ==
The entire expressway is in Tokyo.

Location	km	mi	Exit	Name	Destinations	Notes
Chiyoda	0.0	0.0	—	Kandabashi	Inner Circular Route – Kitaikebukuro, Hakozaki	Access to C1 inner loop and from C1 outer loop only
Chiyoda	0.5	0.31	40P/41P	Tokiwa Bridge		Entrance to Nippon Building parking lot; closed April 2016
Chūō	1.0– 1.1	0.62– 0.68	42P/43P	Yaesu	Yaesu Chikagai parking lot	
Chūō	1.4	0.87	44	Marunouchi	Tokyo Metropolitan Route 406 (Babasaki-dōri) – Nijubashi, Tokyo Station	Entrance to Tokyo Station parking lot; exit to Shimbashi/Haneda/Meguro; southbound exit only
Chūō	1.8	1.1	—	Nishi-Ginza	Tokyo Expressway south – to Inner Circular Route	Entrance to Tokyo Station parking lot; exit to Shimbashi/Haneda/Meguro; access to southbound and from northbound only
1.000 mi = 1.609 km; 1.000 km = 0.621 mi: Closed/former; Incomplete access

== Shiodome spur route ==
=== Route description ===
A short section of expressway between the Inner Circular Route and the southern end of the Tokyo Expressway is designated as a section of the Yaesu Route.

=== List of interchanges ===
The entire expressway is in Tokyo.

Location	km	mi	Exit	Name	Destinations	Notes
Chiyoda	0.0	0.0	–	Shiodome	Inner Circular Route – Haneda, Meguro	Access only from C1 inner loop and to C1 outer loop
Chiyoda	0.1	0.062	–	Shiodome Toll Gate	Tokyo Expressway north	Northern terminus of spur route, expressway continues north as the Tokyo Expressway
1.000 mi = 1.609 km; 1.000 km = 0.621 mi: Closed/former; Incomplete access
