= Juliana's =

Discothèque in Shibaura, Tokyo, Japan

Coordinates: 35°38′47″N 139°45′12″E

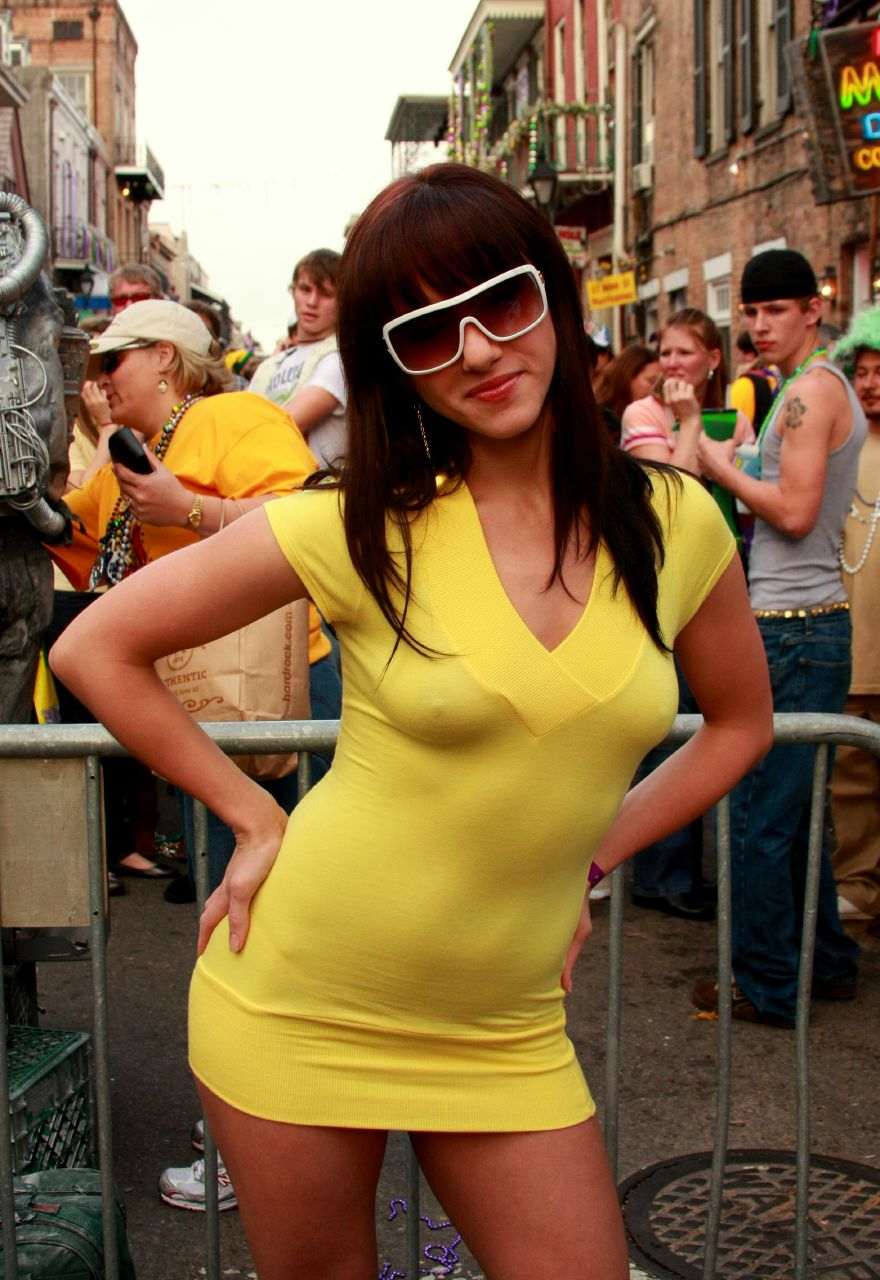
"Bodycon" one-piece dress similar to those used at Juliana's

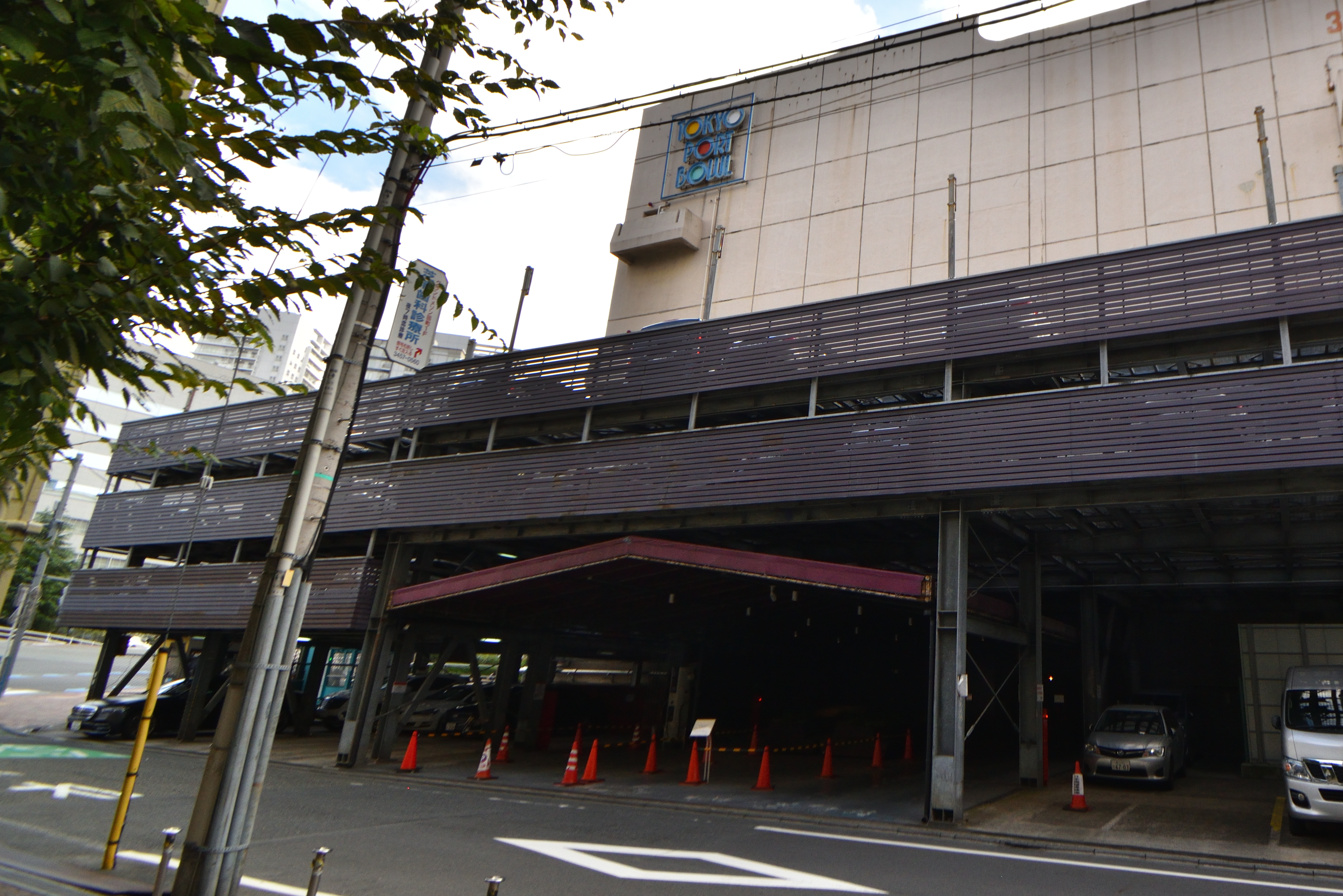
Entrance to what was Juliana's Tokyo, 30 years later

Juliana's, also known as Juliana's Tokyo (ジュリアナ東京), was a British-Japanese discothèque that operated in Shibaura, Minato, Tokyo from May 15, 1991 till August 31, 1994. It was famous for its dance platforms, on which office ladies dressed in "bodycon" (abbr. (wasei-eigo): "body conscious" (ボディコン, bodikon; "sexually flattering clothing")) clubwear would congregate, as amateur go-go dancers (professionals were also employed). The club was produced by Masahiro Origuchi for the British leisure services group Juliana's (led at the time by Michael Wilkings and Mark Vlassopulos), and Nissho Iwai Corporation, the Japanese general trading company (now part of Sojitz).

== History ==
Juliana's opened its doors on May 15, 1991. The club was notable for giving free admission to women in sexy clothing, who would come to dance on elevated stages set up inside the venue. There were plans for two additional Juliana's locations in Tokyo and Osaka. In November of 1993, Japanese police began to put pressure on Juliana's to ban stage dancing, claiming that some women were using fire escapes to change into their skimpy dancewear. Following this, the owners of Juliana's would spend $500,000 remodeling the club in an attempt to attract a different customer base.

The club's attempts to rebrand were unsuccessful, and it would soon be announced that the venue would close its doors on August 31, 1994 — just three years out from its opening. After the disco's closure, it would be converted into an office space by Sasaki Architecture.

== Musical style ==
Juliana's started out playing Italo house before quickly following popular trends to Belgian hardcore techno. The company behind the venue published compilation CDs primarily featuring techno.

== Cultural impact ==
Despite Juliana's short lifespan, it had a large cultural impact on the Japanese nightlife and electronic music scenes of the country. The Juliana culture represented a hedonistic youth culture which had, at that stage, only recently arrived in Japan. The gyaru subculture was particularly drawn to Juliana's, donning skin-tight bodycon dresses as they danced on the club's raised stages. The discotheque's other attendees primarily consisted of office workers and college students. In an article for The Japan Times, Juliana Japan Corporation executive Yoshinori Kasano said "Juliana’s served more as a place for these women to release stress" than as a spot to pick up dates.

On October 26, 2018, a recreation of Juliana's was opened in Osaka's Hankyu Higashidori shopping street.

=== In popular culture ===
There was a television show in Japan dedicated to the venue. The club "Disco Queen" in chapters 18, 19, and 21 of the rugby manga No Side by Ikeda Fumiharu (池田文春) is a reference to Juliana's, down to the white feather fans used by the dancers.

== See also ==
- Herve Leger - the fashion house founded by the creator of the body-con dress
