= Shibaura =

District of Minato Ward, Tokyo, Japan

Coordinates: 35.6418°N 139.7482°E

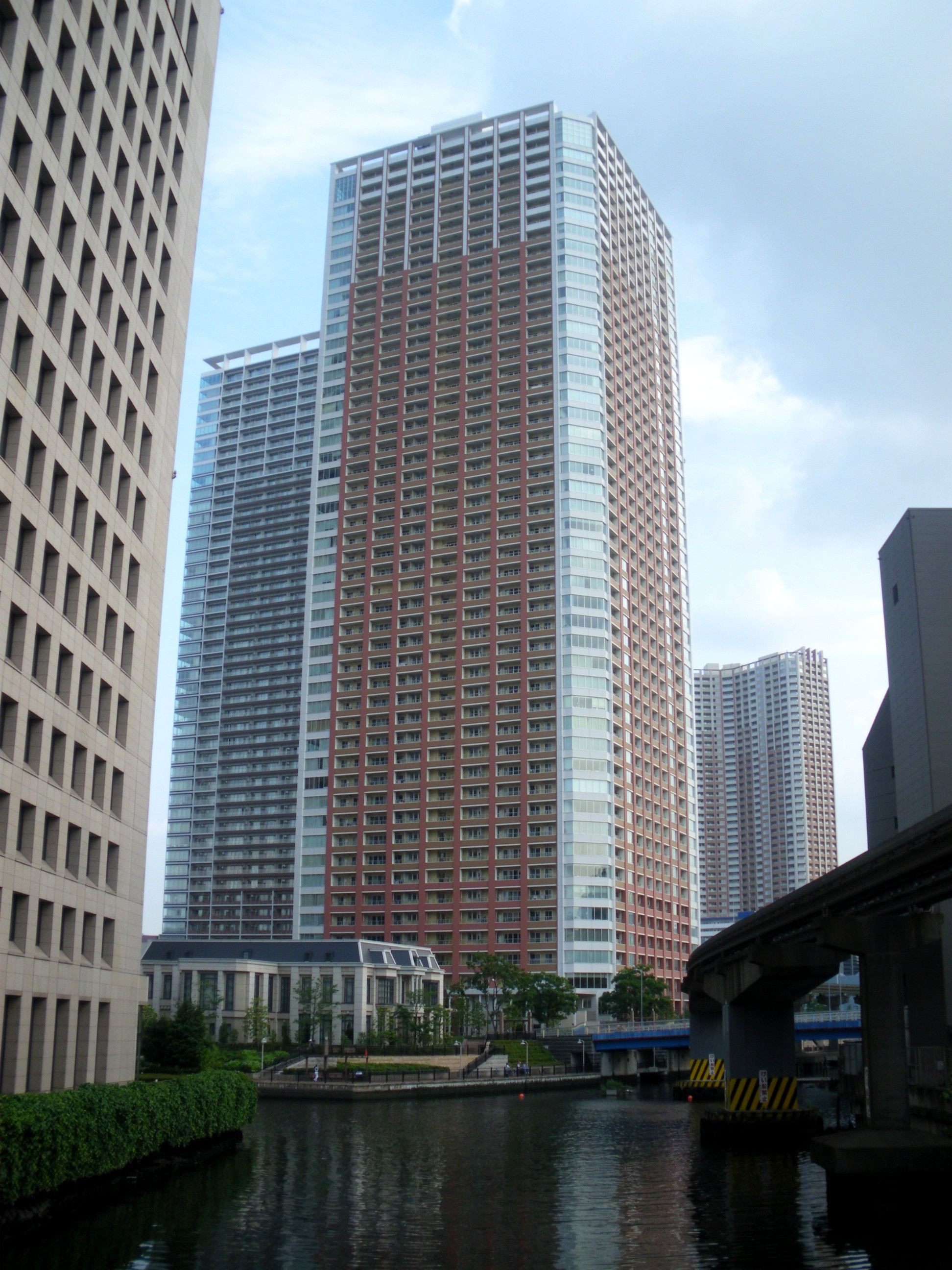
Shibaura Island

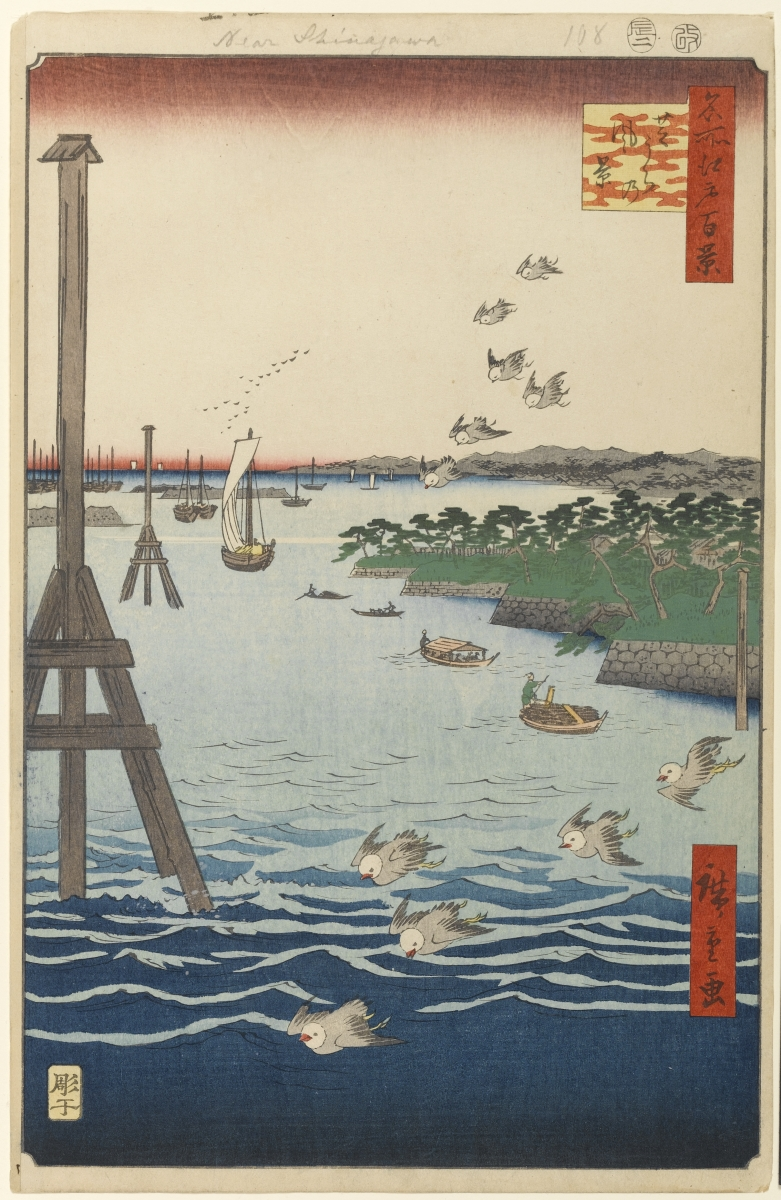
Hiroshige's "View of Shibaura" from the "One Hundred Famous Views of Edo"

Shibaura (芝浦) is a district of Minato ward located in Tokyo, Japan. The district is located between the eastern side of the Yamanote Line train and Tokyo Bay. Shibaura consists mostly of artificial islands created by the excavation of industrial canals in the early 20th century. Formerly a light industrial area, it became famous for its night life during the Japanese asset price bubble period and, since the early 2000s, has become a high-rise residential district.

== Economy ==
=== Corporate headquarters ===
- Bandai Namco Amusement
- FamilyMart
- Kioxia
- Mitsubishi Motors
- SUMCO
- THK
- Yanase

=== Former economic operations ===
- Toshiba (originally Tokyo Shibaura Electric)

== Rail links ==
The district is served by Tamachi Station on the Yamanote and Keihin-Tōhoku Lines, and by Shibaura-futō Station of the Yurikamome line. The Yokosuka Line also runs in a tunnel below the district, although there are no stops in the area.

== Road links ==
The Tokyo Expressway system passes through the area, and the central Tokyo side of Route 11 connecting to the Rainbow Bridge terminates at Shibaura Junction.

== Education ==
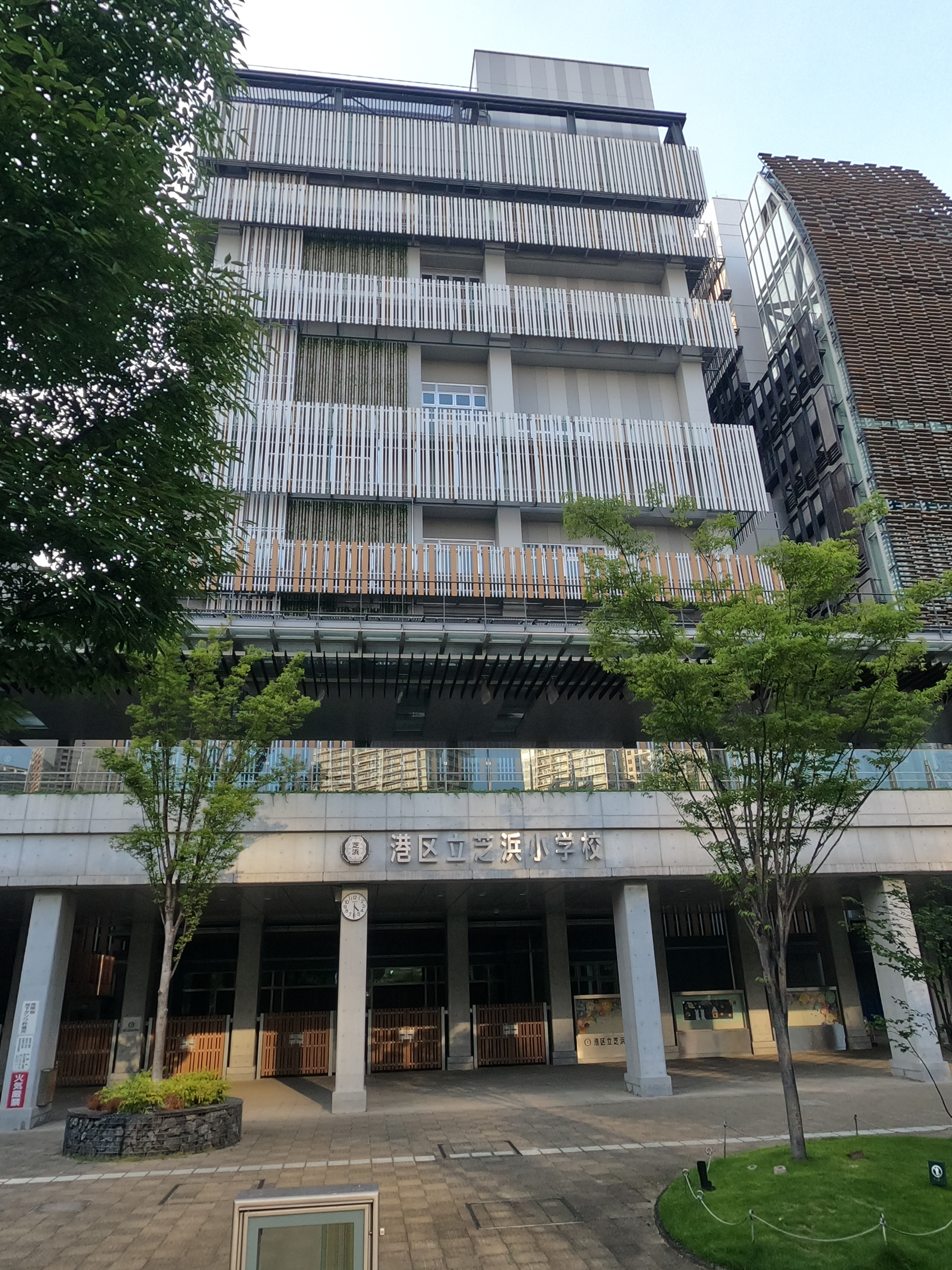
Shibahama Elementary School (芝浜小学校)

Minato City Board of Education operates public elementary and junior high schools.

Shibaura 1 chōme 6-16 ban, Shibaura 2-3 chōme, and 4-chōme 20-22-ban are zoned to Shibahama Elementary School (芝浜小学校). Shibaura 4-chōme 1-19-ban are zoned to Shibaura Elementary School (芝浦小学校). The Shibahama Elementary and Shibaura Elementary zones feed into Konan Junior High School (港南中学校). Shibaura 1 chōme 1-5-ban are zoned to Shiba Elementary School (芝小学校) and Mita Junior High School (港区立三田中学校).

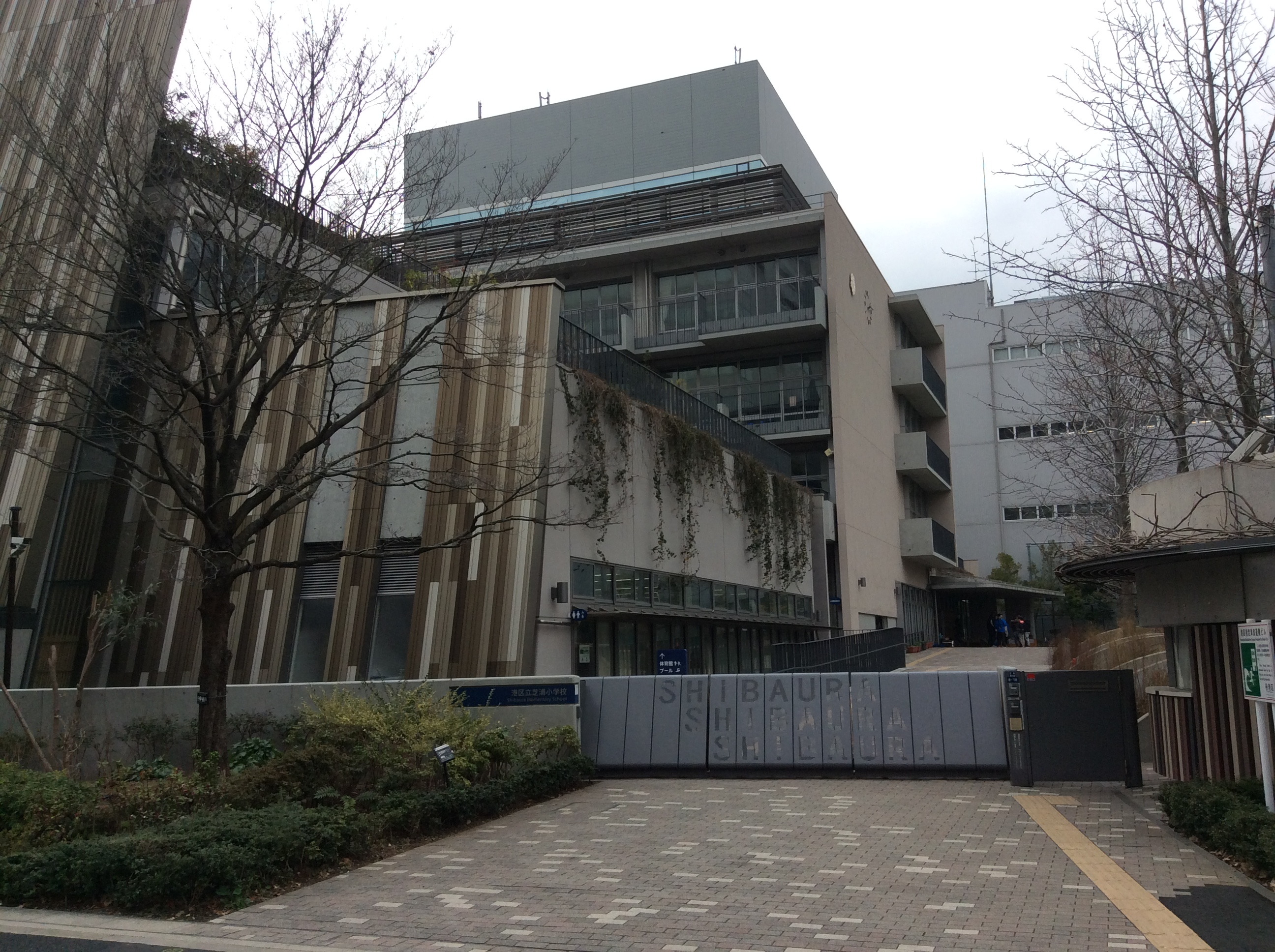
(芝浦小学校)

== In popular culture ==
- Hiroshige's Shibaura no fūkei (芝うらの風景) from his One Hundred Famous Views of Edo series depicts a view of Shibaura in 1856.
- Masahiro Makino's 1967 film The Chivalrous Life (侠骨一代) features locations set in Shibaura.
- The popular 1980s TV Asahi series Seibu Keisatsu (西部警察) frequently filmed in and around Shibaura.
- Juzo Itami's 1985 film Tampopo (タンポポ) features Old Kaigan Road in the 4th district (4丁目) as the location of its titular restaurant, and shot much the film in the neighborhood.
- Legendary 1990s nightclub Juliana's with its own dedicated television series was in the Shibaura 1st district (1丁目). The club is also referenced in Ikeda Fumiharu's manga No Side.
- Shibaura features in Takao Okawara's 1992 film Godzilla vs. Mothra.

== See also ==
- List of islands by population density
