= Kaigan =

Kaigan 海岸
- District
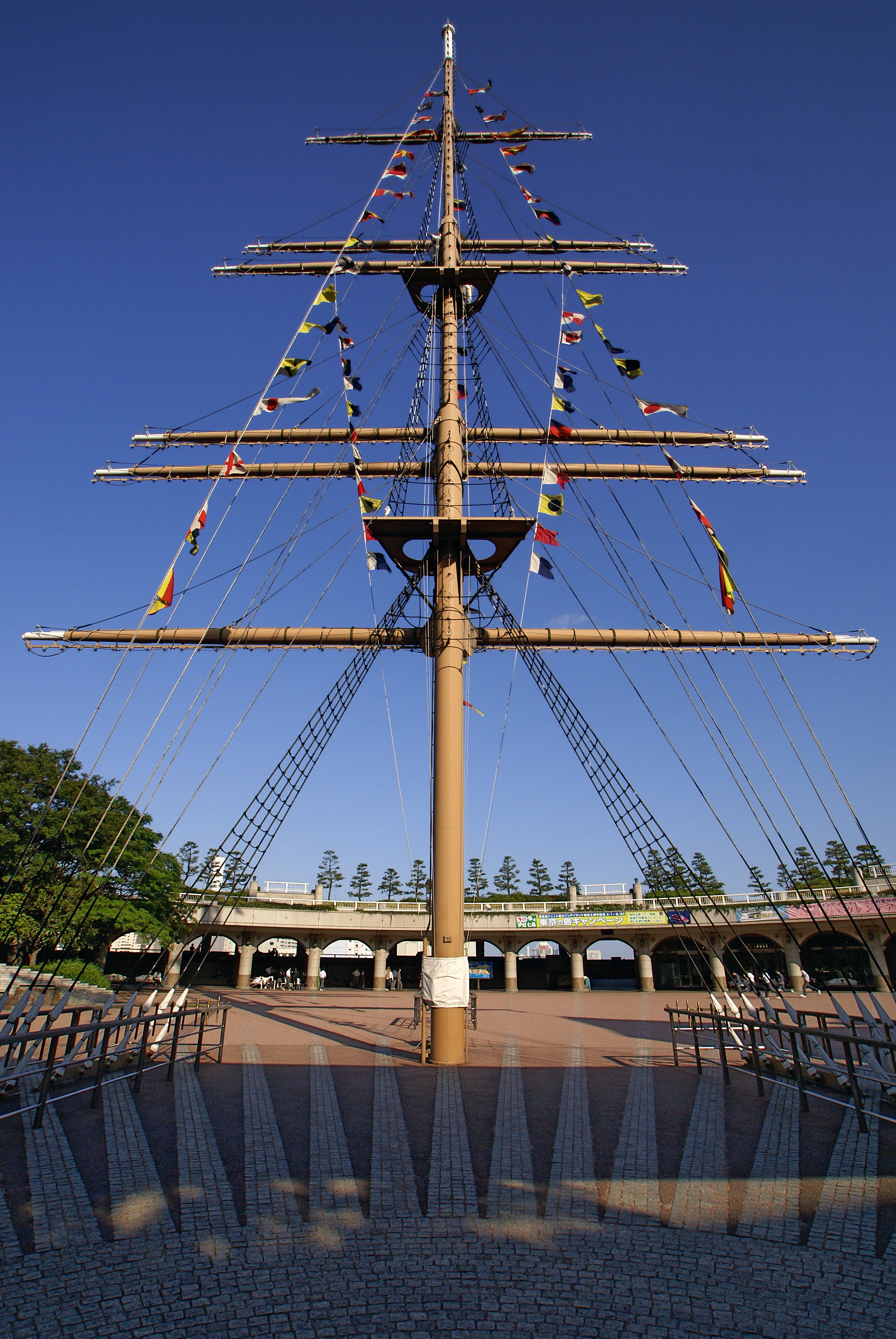
- Takeshiba Pier Park and Takeshiba Passenger Ship Terminal (back)

- Location of Kaigan within Tokyo Location of Kaigan within Tokyo Bay
- Coordinates: 35°39′9.54″N 139°45′3.75″E
- Country: Japan
- Region: Kantō
- Prefecture: Tokyo
- Ward: Minato

Area
  - Total: 1.13 km^{2} (0.44 sq mi)

Population (August 1, 2019)
  - Total: 6,444
- Time zone: UTC+9 (JST)
- Zip code: 105-0022 (1-2 chome); 108-0022 (Sanchome)
- Area code: 03

Kaigan (海岸) is a district of Minato, Tokyo, Japan. The current administrative place names are Kaigan 1-chome to Kaigan 3-chome. It is an area where the residential address has been displayed. Kaigan 1-chome belongs to the Shiba district general branch office, and Kaigan 2-3 chome belongs to the Shibaura-Kōnan district general branch.

== Education ==
Minato City Board of Education operates public elementary and junior high schools.

Kaigan 1-chōme is zoned to Onarimon Elementary School (御成門小学校) and Onarimon Junior High School (御成門中学校). Kaigan 2-chōme is zoned to Shiba Elementary School (芝小学校) and Mita Junior High School (港区立三田中学校). 1-3, 14-19, and 22-30-ban of Kaigan 3-chōme are zoned to Shibahama Elementary School (芝浜小学校) while 4-13, 20-21, and 31-33-ban of 3-chōme are zoned to Shibaura Elementary School (芝浦小学校). All of 3-chōme is zoned to Konan Junior High School (港南中学校).
