= Meguro Route =

Radial route of the Shuto Expressway system, Tokyo, Japan

Shuto Expressway Meguro Route 首都高速2号目黒線

Route information
- Maintained by Metropolitan Expressway Company Limited
- Length: 5.9 km (3.7 mi)

Location
- Country: Japan

Highway system
- National highways of Japan; Expressways of Japan

The Meguro Route (目黒線, Meguro-sen), signed as Route 2, is one of the radial routes of the Shuto Expressway system in the Tokyo area. Route 2 runs southwest and south from Ichinohashi Junction (with the Inner Circular Route) in Minato-ku and currently ends at a local road (Keihin #2 Road) in Shinagawa-ku. The current length of the highway is 5.9 km. The original expressway plans called for Route 2 to connect to the Keihin #3 Expressway (in Setagaya-ku) but no definite expansion plans have been announced.

== Exit list ==
| Municipality | Exit/interchange name | Destinations | Notes |
|---|---|---|---|
| Minato-ku | Ichinohashi JCT | Route C1 Outer Loop to Shinjuku and Kita-ikebukuro; Route C1 Inner Loop to Haneda and Ginza | |
| Minato-ku | Tengenji | French Embassy in Tokyo | Outbound exit/inbound entrance |
| Minato-ku | Meguro | Meguro Station | Outbound exit/inbound entrance |
| Shinagawa-ku | Togoshi | Keihin #2 Road (National Route 1) to Yokohama | Outbound exit/inbound entrance |
| Shinagawa-ku | Ebara | Nakahara-kaido avenue to Den-en-chofu, and Yokohama | Outbound exit/inbound entrance |
