= SUMCO =

Japanese Company

SUMCO Corporation

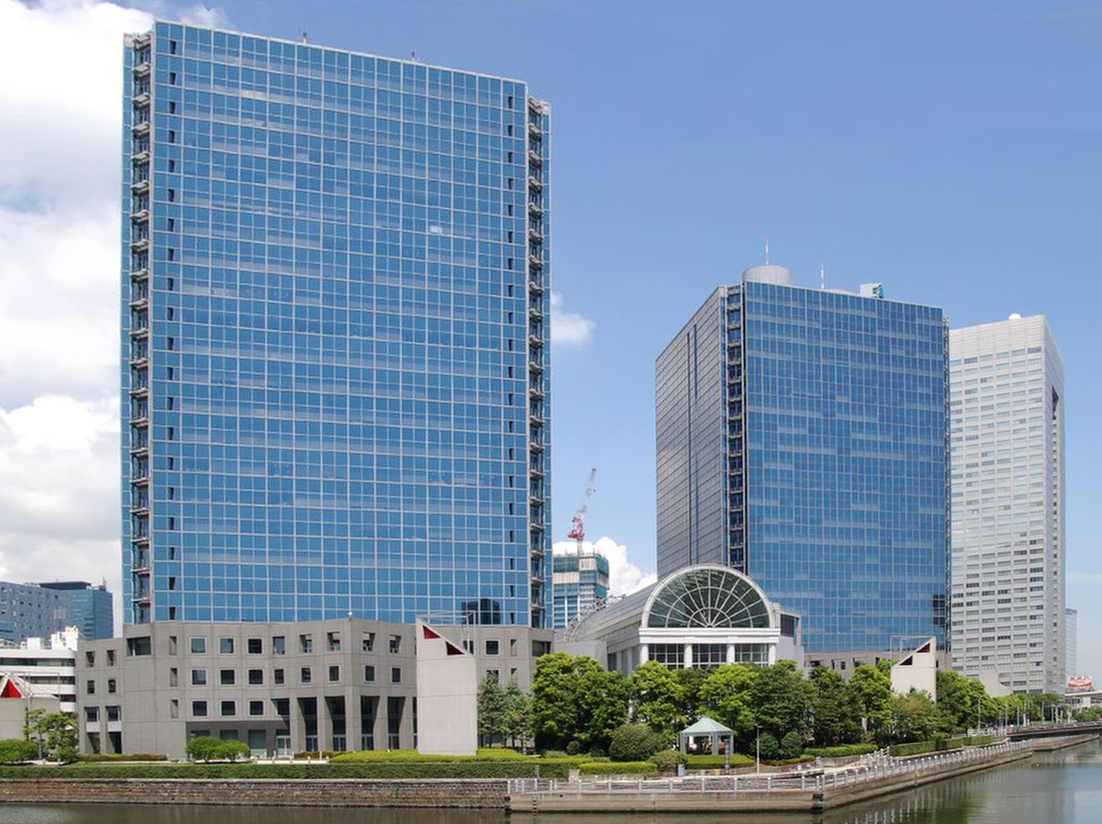
- Company headquarters in the Seavans North tower (right-hand side building)
- Company type: Public KK
- Traded as: TYO: 3436
- Industry: Semiconductor
- Predecessors: Silicon United Manufacturing; Sumitomo Mitsubishi Silicon
- Founded: July 30, 1999; 26 years ago
- Headquarters: 1-2-1 Shibaura, Minato, Tokyo 105-8634, Japan
- Area served: Worldwide
- Key people: Mayuki Hashimoto (President and CEO)
- Services: Silicon wafers; Silicon ingots
- Revenue: ▲$ 1.83 billion USD (FY 2013) (¥ 200.58 billion JPY) (FY 2013)
- Net income: ▲$ 16.5 million USD (FY 2013) (¥ 1.8 billion JPY) (FY 2013)
- Number of employees: 7,277 (consolidated as of December 31, 2013)
- Website: www.sumcosi.com/english/index.html

SUMCO Corporation (株式会社SUMCO, Kabushiki-gaisha Samuko; formerly Silicon United Manufacturing Corporation and Sumitomo Mitsubishi Silicon Corporation) is a Japanese semiconductor company, manufacturing silicon wafers for semiconductor manufacturers worldwide.

== History ==
The company was established in 1999 as a joint venture between Mitsubishi Materials Corporation and Sumitomo Metal Industries and as of 2013 is the second largest silicon wafer producer in the world, after Shin-Etsu Handotai, with a market share of 30%. In 2001, SUMCO employed about 1,300 people in Oregon, which in 2003 was reduced to 680 after the U.S. manufacturing operations were consolidated.

In June 2006, SUMCO acquired a 51% controlling stake in Komatsu Electronic Metals Co., making them a member of the SUMCO group. Komatsu Electronic Metals Co. has a venture partnership with Formosa Plastics Group and has wafer plants in Miyazaki and Nagasaki.

SUMCO acquired Mitsubishi Polycrystalline Silicon America Corp and Semiconductor Polysilicon Business Of Mitsubishi from Mitsubishi Materials Corporation in May 2023.

SUMCO is listed on the first section of the Tokyo Stock Exchange and is a constituent of the Nikkei 225 stock index.

== Products ==
The company manufactures the following products:

- Single crystal silicon ingots
- Polished wafers
- Annealed wafers
- Epitaxial wafers
- Junction isolated wafers
- Silicon-on-Insulator (SOI) wafers
- Reclaimed polished wafers
