= Tokyo Expressway =

Former expressway in Tokyo, Japan

Tokyo Expressway 東京高速道路

Route information
- Maintained by Tokyo Expressway Company
- Length: 2.0 km (1.2 mi)
- Existed: 1959–5 April 2025

Major junctions
- Beltway around Ginza, Chūō, Tokyo, Japan
- South end: Yaesu Route (spur)
- Yaesu Route
- North end: Inner Circular Route (spur)

Location
- Country: Japan

Highway system
- National highways of Japan; Expressways of Japan

The Tokyo Expressway (東京高速道路, Tōkyō Kōsoku Dōro), also known as the KK Route, is a mostly closed 2.0-kilometer-long (1.2 mi) untolled expressway in central Tokyo owned and maintained by the Tokyo Expressway Company (Tōkyō Kōsoku Dōro K.K.). It is signed as D8. It previously ran in a semicircular loop around the Ginza district of Chūō-ku, but now only exists as stub between the Inner Circular Route of the Shuto Expressway and Tokyo Metropolitan Route 316. The majority of the expressway was closed to vehicular traffic in April 2025 to be converted into an elevated park owned by the Tokyo Expressway Company known as the Tokyo Sky Park.

== Route description ==
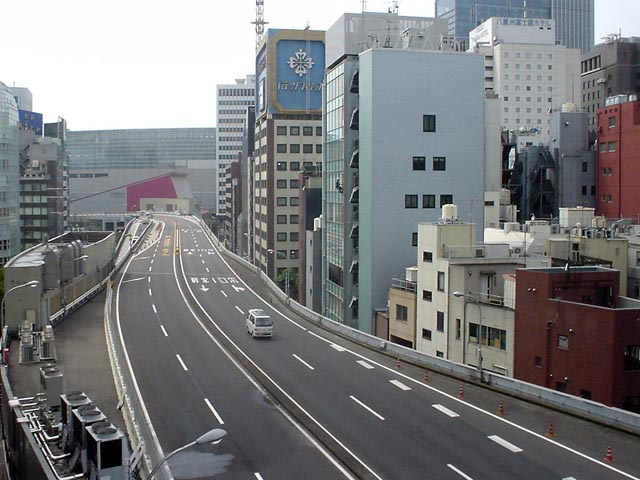
Looking west towards Nishi-Ginza Junction from the northern terminus of the expressway

The Tokyo Expressway was a 2.0-kilometer-long (1.2 mi) privately owned highway enclosing all but the eastern border of Tokyo's Ginza district. It was connected to the Inner Circular Route of the Shuto Expressway at both ends indirectly. During its operation, the expressway was funded by rent collected by the Tokyo Expressway Company. Due to this business structure, unlike the majority of expressways in Japan, it had been free for public use due to the rental income generated from the commercial spaces owned by the expressway company located underneath the expressway's right-of-way.

== History ==
In 1951, 23 business leaders founded the Tokyo Expressway Company Limited with the goal of revitalizing Ginza after the war and easing congestion of automobile traffic. The expressway was built upon infill of the outer moat surrounding Ginza. Water still flows beneath the expressway where the moat once was, but contained in below ground culverts. Portions of the highway were opened in 1959, making it the oldest expressway in Japan. The Tokyo Expressway was completed in 1966.

=== Elevated park conversion ===
In December 2023, it was decided by the Tokyo Expressway Company that the entire route would be permanently closed in April 2025 to automobile traffic with the exception of the portion of the expressway connecting the Inner Circular Route to the Higashi-Ginza exit. The closure is slated to convert the elevated expressway right of way into an elevated park similar to the Coulée verte René-Dumont in Paris or the High Line in New York City. The Tokyo Expressway Company will continue to operate as the owners of the elevated park, referred to as the Tokyo Sky Corridor by the Tokyo Metropolitan Government, and the remaining segment of the expressway. Vehicular traffic from the Tokyo Expressway and a portion of the Inner Circular Route will be rerouted to connect to the Yaesu Route with a tunnel called the Shinkyobashi Connector by 2040.

Tokyo's governor, Yuriko Koike approved of the concept for the future of the Tokyo Expressway, stating that "it is an incredible dream to have roads in the middle of the city turn green". A three day event was held by the Tokyo Metropolitan Government and the Tokyo Expressway Company from 4-6 May 2024 during the Golden Week holidays, where the expressway was temporarily turned into a pedestrian zone to promote the project, simulate the completed park, and get feedback from the public. The majority of attendees approved of the premise of the future elevated park and felt that it would be a pedestrian-friendly environment.

== List of interchanges ==
The entire expressway is in Tokyo.

Location	km	mi	Exit	Name	Destinations	Notes
Through to Inner Circular Route
Chūō	0.0	0.0	—	Shiodome Toll Gate	Yaesu Route – to Haneda	Southern terminus of the Tokyo Expressway; highway continues as the Shiodome spur of the Yaesu Route to Shiodome Junction. Closed in April 2025.
Chūō	0.0	0.0	1	Shinbashi	Tokyo Metropolitan Route 316 (Shōwa-dōri) / Gomon-dōri	Entrance only from Tokyo Metropolitan Route 316, exit only to Gomon-dōri. Closed in April 2025.
Chūō	0.5	0.31	2	Dobashi	Tokyo Metropolitan Route 405	Entrance only from Tokyo Metropolitan Route 405. Closed in April 2025.
Chūō	1.4	0.87	—	Nishi-Ginza	Yaesu Route – to Kita-Ikebukuro	Northbound exit, southbound entrance. Closed in April 2025.
Chūō	1.4	0.87	3	Nishi-Ginza	Yanagi-dōri / Ginza Sakura-dōri	Entrance only from Yanagi-dōri. Closed in April 2025.
Chūō	1.7	1.1	4	Shinkyobashi	Tokyo Metropolitan Route 316 (Shōwa-dōri)	Northbound exit. Closed in April 2025.
Chūō	1.9	1.2	5	Higashi-Ginza	Tokyo Metropolitan Route 316 (Shōwa-dōri)	Southbound exit.
Chūō	2.0	1.2	—	Shirauobashi Toll Gate	Inner Circular Route – Ueno, Kandabashi	Northern terminus of the Tokyo Expressway; highway continues as the Kyobashi spur of the Inner Circular Route to Kyobashi Junction. Northbound route was closed in April 2025.
Through to Inner Circular Route
1.000 mi = 1.609 km; 1.000 km = 0.621 mi: Closed/former; Incomplete access; Route transition
