= Rainbow Bridge (Tokyo) =

Rainbow Bridge レインボーブリッジ
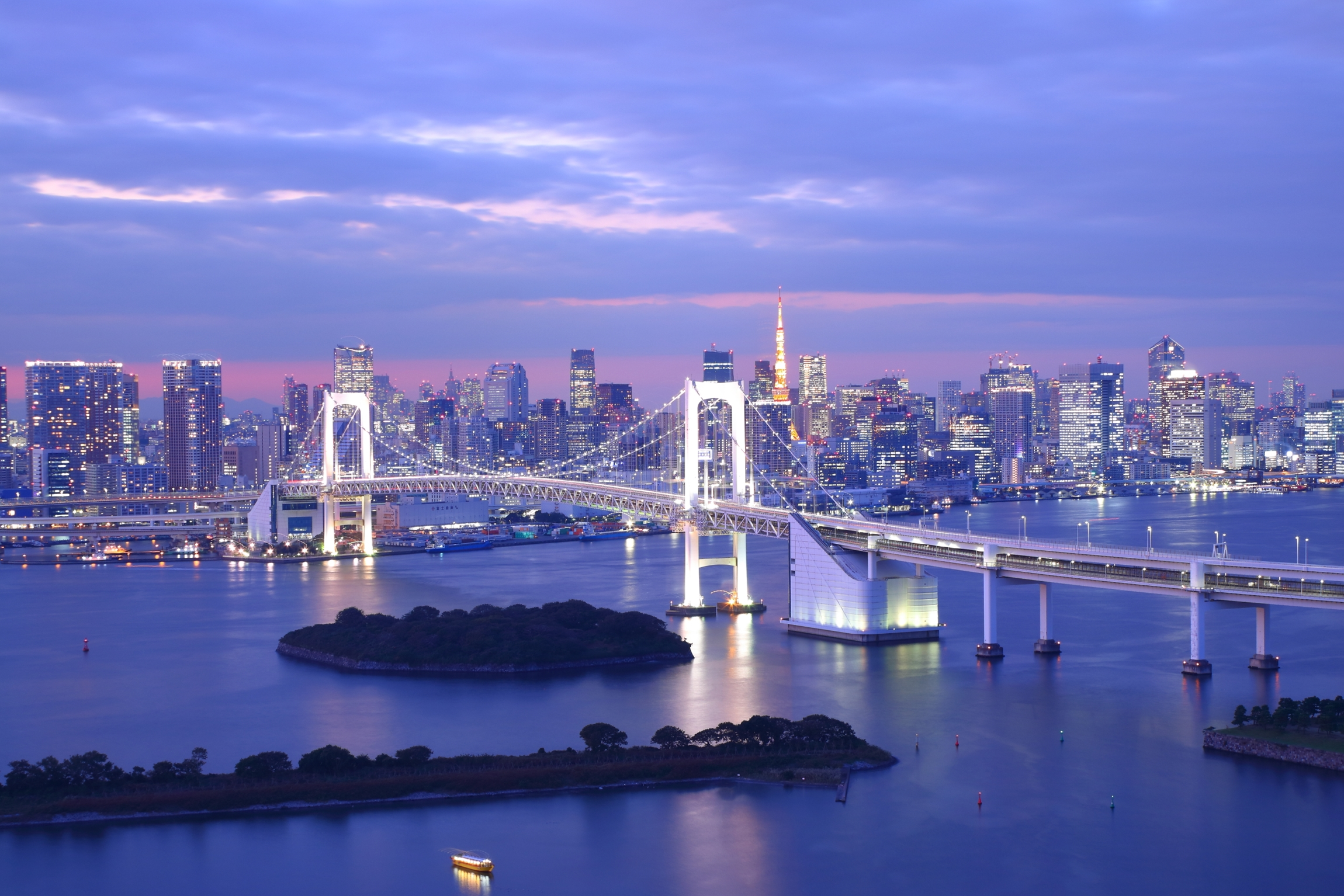
- Coordinates: 35°38′11″N 139°45′49″E
- Carries: 4 lanes (Shuto Expressway – Daiba Route, upper deck); 4 lanes (Tokyo Prefectural Route 482, lower deck); 2 tracks ( Yurikamome rapid transit, lower deck); Pedestrian walkways (lower deck)
- Crosses: Tokyo Bay
- Locale: Minato, Tokyo, Japan

Characteristics
- Total length: 798 m (2,618 ft)
- Width: 49 m (161 ft)
- Height: Towers: 126 m (413 ft); Roadway: 52 m (171 ft)
- Longest span: 570 m (1,870 ft)
- No. of spans: 3

History
- Construction start: 1987
- Construction end: 1993
- Opened: August 26, 1993

Location
- Interactive map of Rainbow Bridge

The Rainbow Bridge (Japanese: レインボーブリッジ, Hepburn: Reinbō Burijji) is a suspension bridge crossing northern Tokyo Bay between Shibaura Pier and the Odaiba waterfront development in Minato, Tokyo, Japan. Its official name is the Tokyo Port Bridge (東京港連絡橋, Tōkyō Kō Renrakukyō). The English name "Rainbow Bridge" was chosen by public vote. The bridge carries road, rail and pedestrian traffic on two decks and is a prominent element of the Odaiba waterfront skyline.

== Design and construction ==
The bridge was built by Kawasaki Heavy Industries. Construction began in 1987 and was completed in 1993.

The bridge is a double-decker bridge with an overall length of 798 m (2,618 ft) and a main span of 580 m (1,903 ft). The towers supporting the bridge are painted white to harmonize with the skyline of central Tokyo as seen from Odaiba. Lamps placed on the supporting cables are illuminated in three different colors—red, white and green—each night using solar energy collected during the day.

== Usage ==
The Rainbow Bridge carries three transportation lines on two decks.

=== Upper deck ===
The upper deck carries the Shuto Expressway's Daiba Route.

=== Lower deck ===
The lower deck carries the Yurikamome rapid transit line in the centre, Tokyo Prefectural Route 482 between the walkways and the road lanes, and pedestrian walkways on the outer sides.

==== Vehicles ====
Light motorcycles under 50 cc are not permitted on either deck or on the walkways. Motorcycle pillion passengers are also banned.

==== Walkways ====
There are two separate pedestrian walkways on the north and south sides of the lower deck. The north walkway offers views of the inner Tokyo harbour and Tokyo Tower; the south walkway offers views of Tokyo Bay and, on clear days, Mount Fuji. Access hours are seasonal: 09:00–21:00 in summer and 10:00–18:00 in winter; access to the walkways closes 30 minutes before closing time. Bicycles are permitted only when pushed (not ridden) because of the walkways' narrow width. The bridge can be reached on foot from Tamachi Station (JR East) or Shibaura-futō Station (Yurikamome) on the mainland side.

== Panorama ==
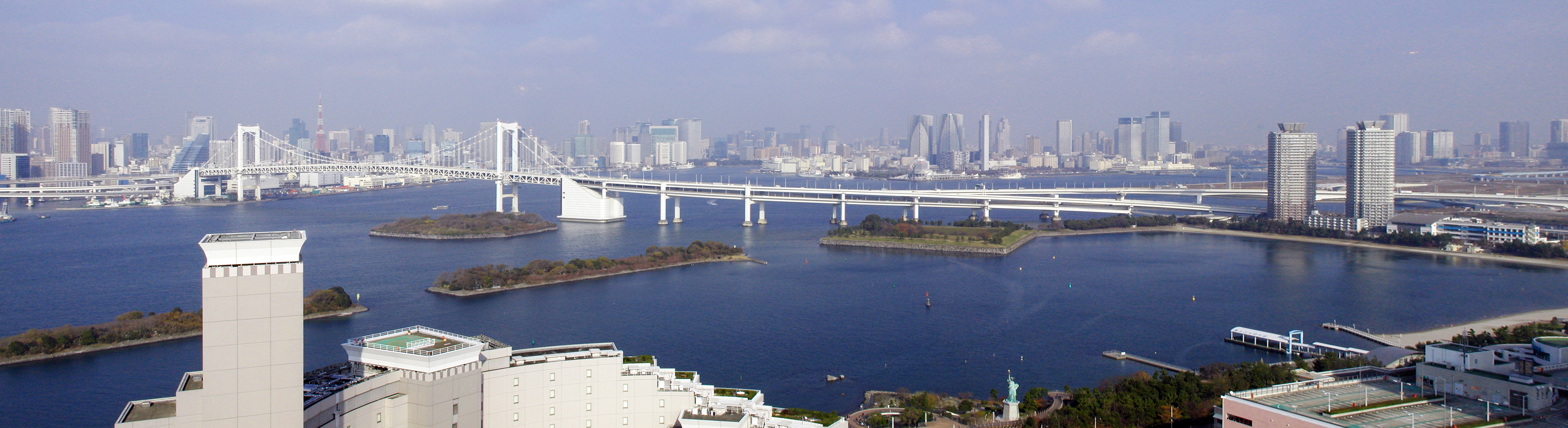
A panoramic view of Rainbow Bridge and the surrounding Tokyo Bay area as seen from Odaiba during the day

== Gallery ==
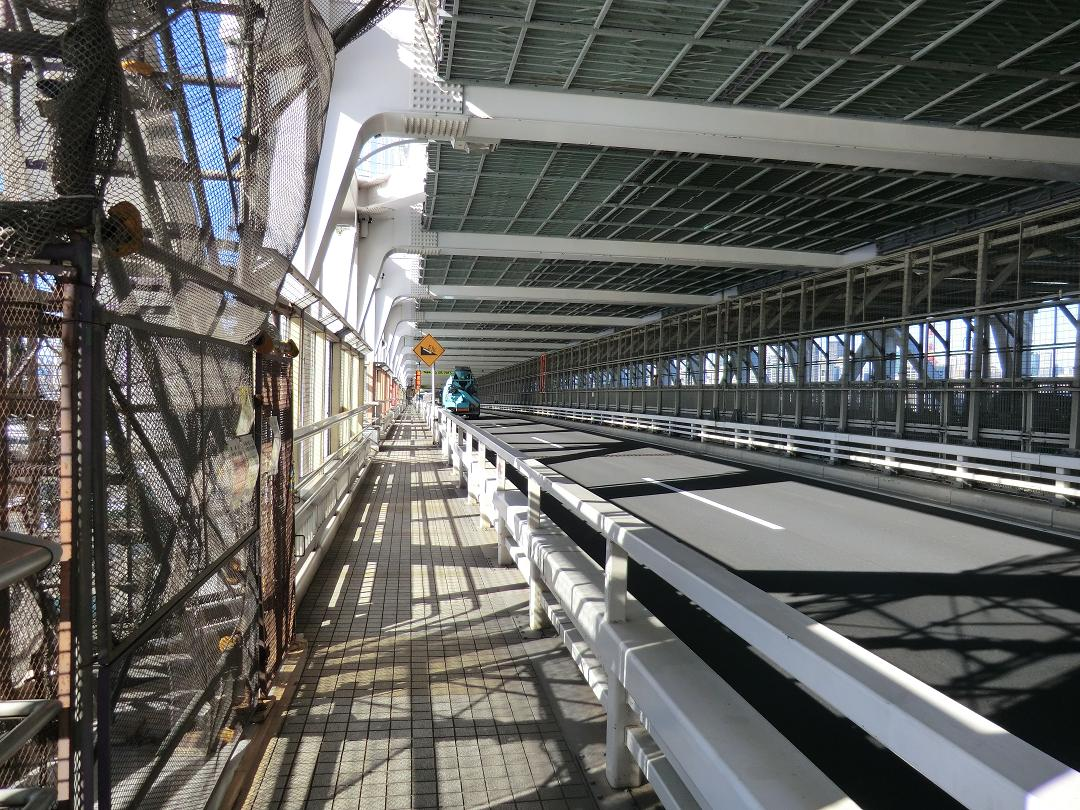
View of the walkway

Scenes of Rainbow Bridge from ground level and from the air, 2018

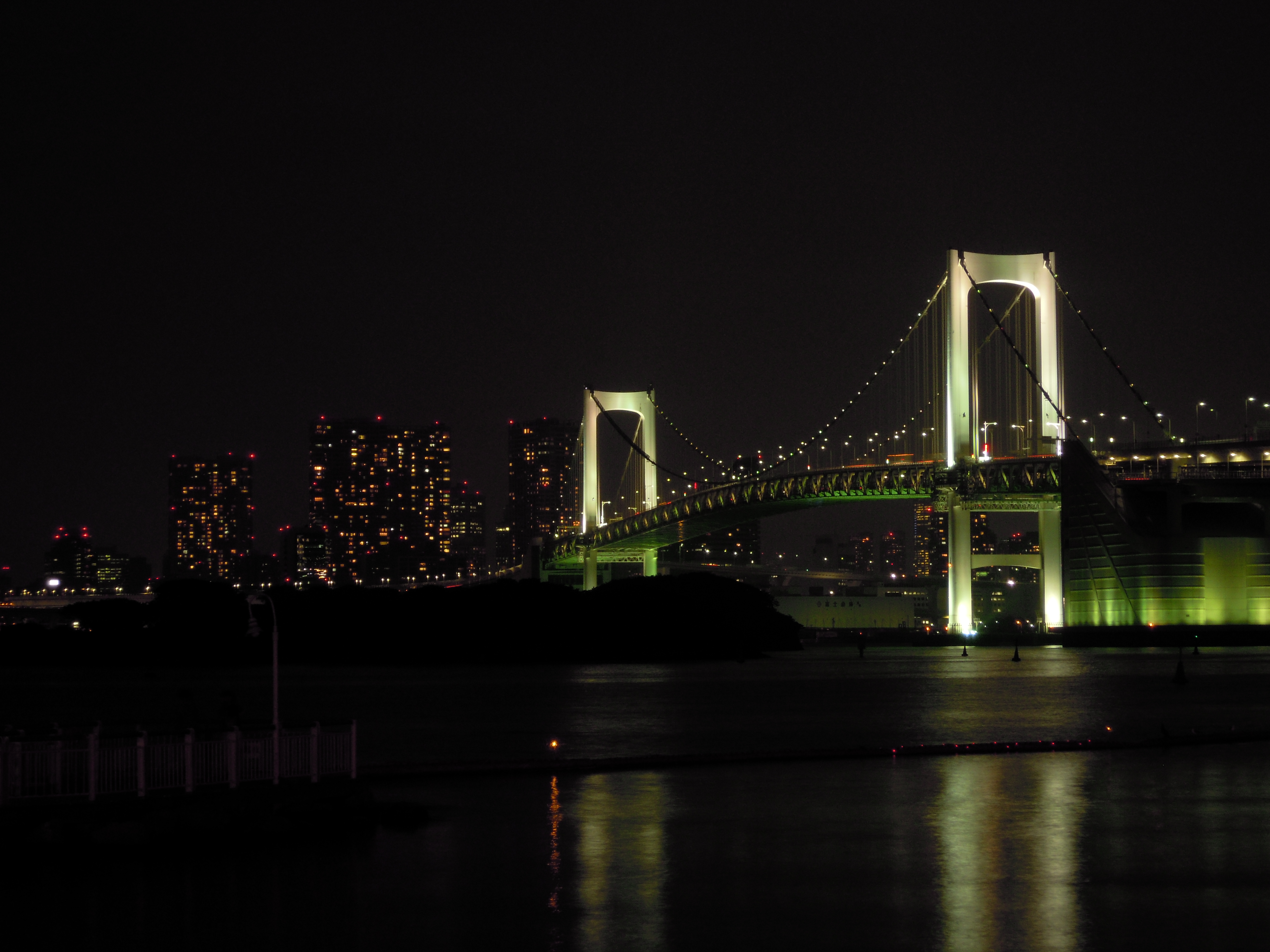
Rainbow Bridge at night, lit in white lights

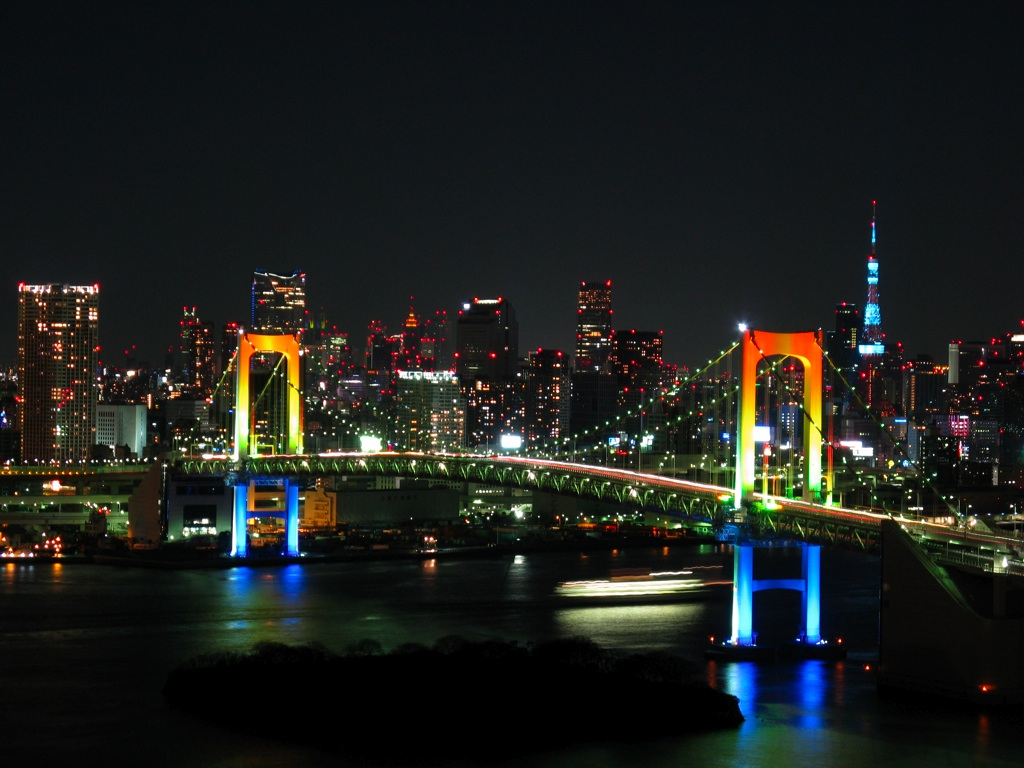
Rainbow Bridge at night, lit in rainbow colors

== See also ==
- Akashi Kaikyo Bridge
- Tokyo Bay Aqua-Line
- Yokohama Bay Bridge
- List of bridges in Japan
- List of longest suspension bridge spans
- All Nippon Airways Flight 61 - the hijacking incident perpetrated by a hijacker who attempted to fly the plane under said bridge.
