= THK Co., Ltd. =

Japanese machinery components manufacturing and engineering company

- Company type: Public (K.K)
- Traded as: TYO: 6481
- ISIN: JP3539250005
- Industry: Machinery
- Founded: April 10, 1971; 55 years ago
- Headquarters: Shibaura, Minato, Tokyo, Japan
- Key people: Akihiro Teramachi, CEO
- Number of employees: 13,260 (consolidated, as of December 31, 2019)
- Website: thk.com

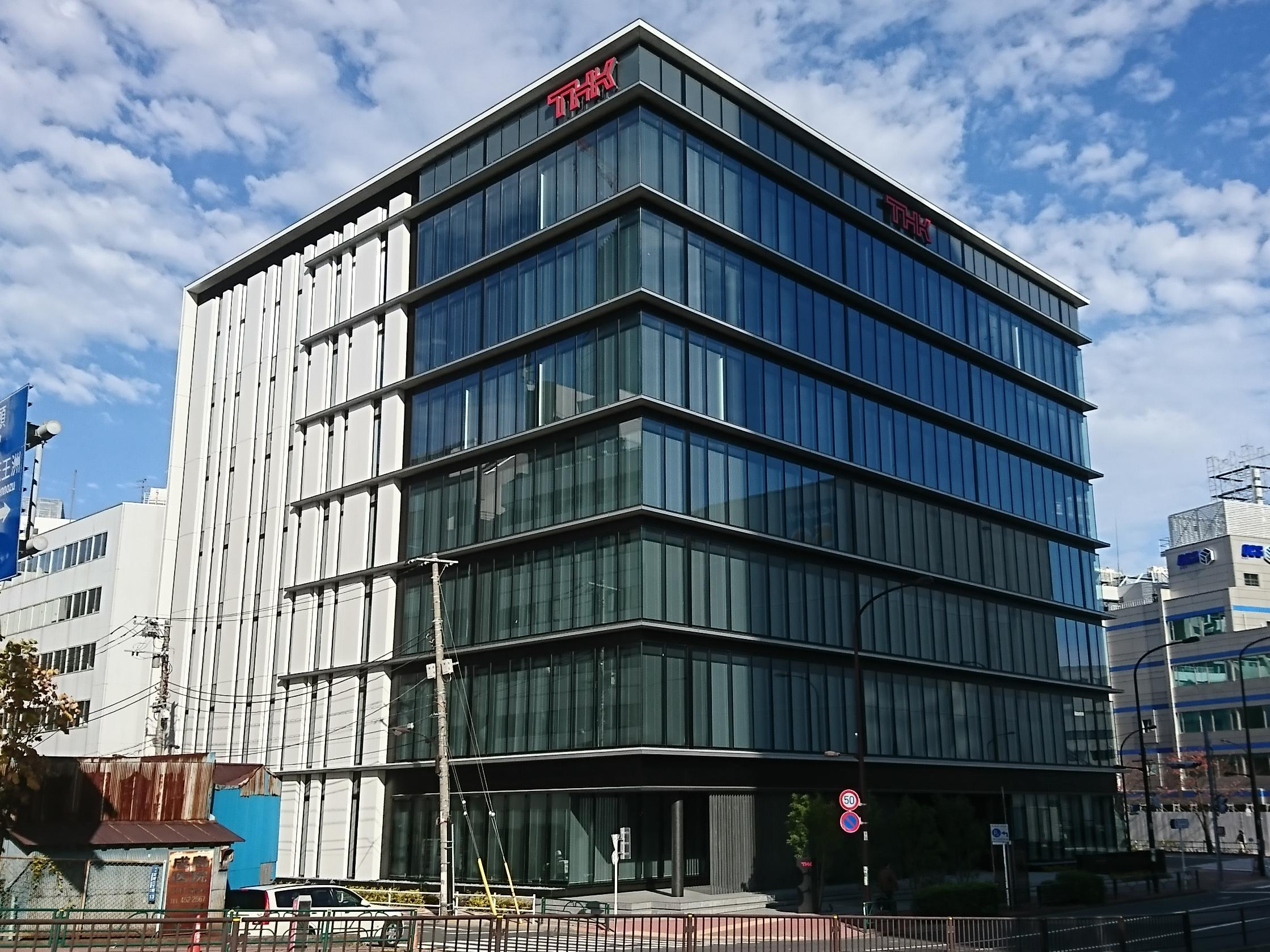
THK Headquarters in Shibaura, Tokyo

THK Co., Ltd. is a Japanese company that offers machine elements and modules in the field of mechanical engineering, robotics and automation. The headquarters are in Tokyo. Since it was founded in April 1971, the company has developed into an international company. THK shares have been listed on the Tokyo Stock Exchange's first segment since 2001.

As 2022, THK has 37 manufacturing facilities in Japan, Europe, North and South America and Asia including associated companies.

== History ==
In 1972, THK became the first company in the world to develop a method of linear motion with rolling contact and began manufacturing and selling linear guides (profiled rail guides) under the LM Guide brand. In mechanical engineering and in the production of mechatronic systems and plants, these linear guides enable a significant improvement in accuracy and speed while at the same time reducing assembly and energy costs. With the linear guides, machine tools and industrial robots can perform ultra-precise movements, and devices for manufacturing semiconductors can be operated in the submicron range. In recent times, the linear guides are not only used in mechanical engineering and automation, but also in rail technology, aerospace, medical devices, and amusement equipment. In addition, special linear guides are offered for protection against earthquakes in cultural monuments, data centers, and residential buildings.

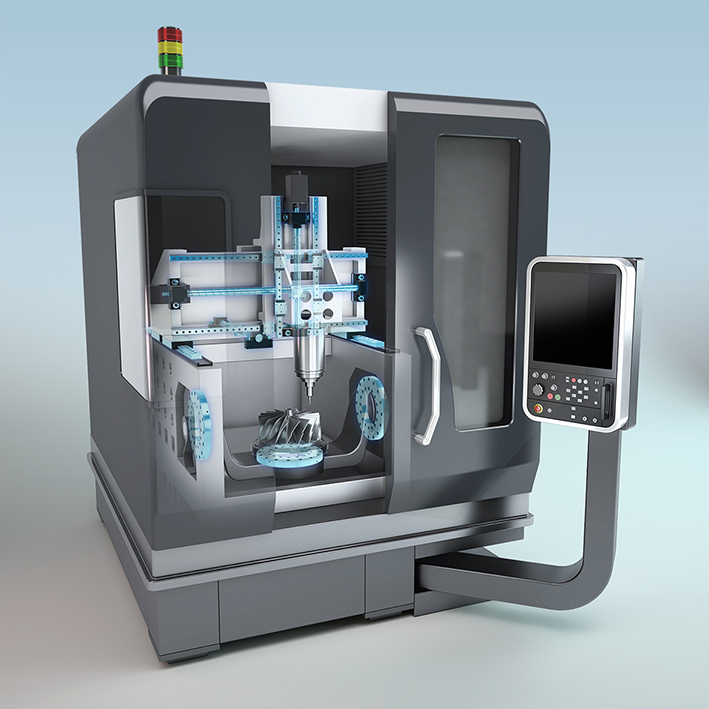
Machining center with linear guides, ballscrews and cross-roller rings

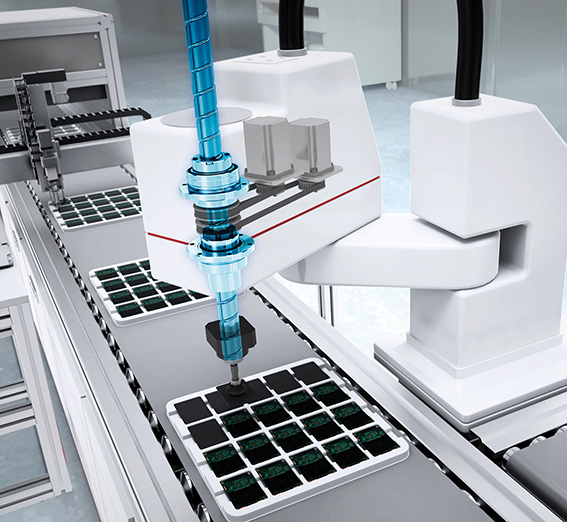
Scara Robot with BNS

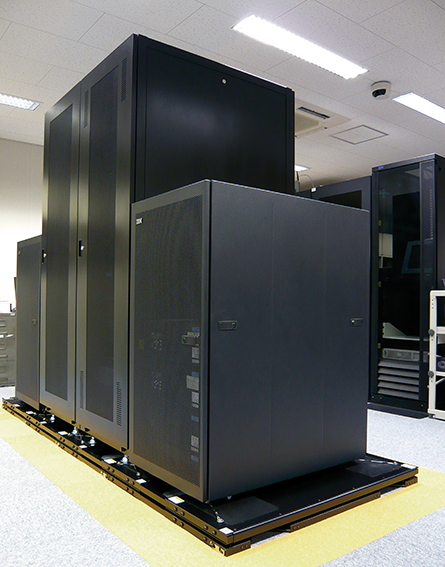
IBM Mainframe server with seismic isolation table for protection against earthquakes

In fiscal year 2019, THK generated sales of around 274.5 billion yen (approx. 2.2 billion EUR) with 13,260 employees worldwide. Furthermore, THK holds more than 603 patents in Japan and 1,174 patents abroad (December 31, 2019).

THK America, based in Schaumburg, Illinois, was named the top company in Quality Magazine's annual Quality Leadership rankings for 2022. The facility manufactures linear motion (LM) guide systems used in the manufacturing of semiconductors, liquid crystals, amusement devices, and medical equipment.
