= Daiba Route =

Expressway in the Greater Tokyo area

Shuto Expressway Daiba Route 首都高速11号台場線

Route information
- Maintained by Metropolitan Expressway Company Limited
- Length: 5.0 km (3.1 mi)
- Existed: 1993–present

Location
- Country: Japan

Highway system
- National highways of Japan; Expressways of Japan

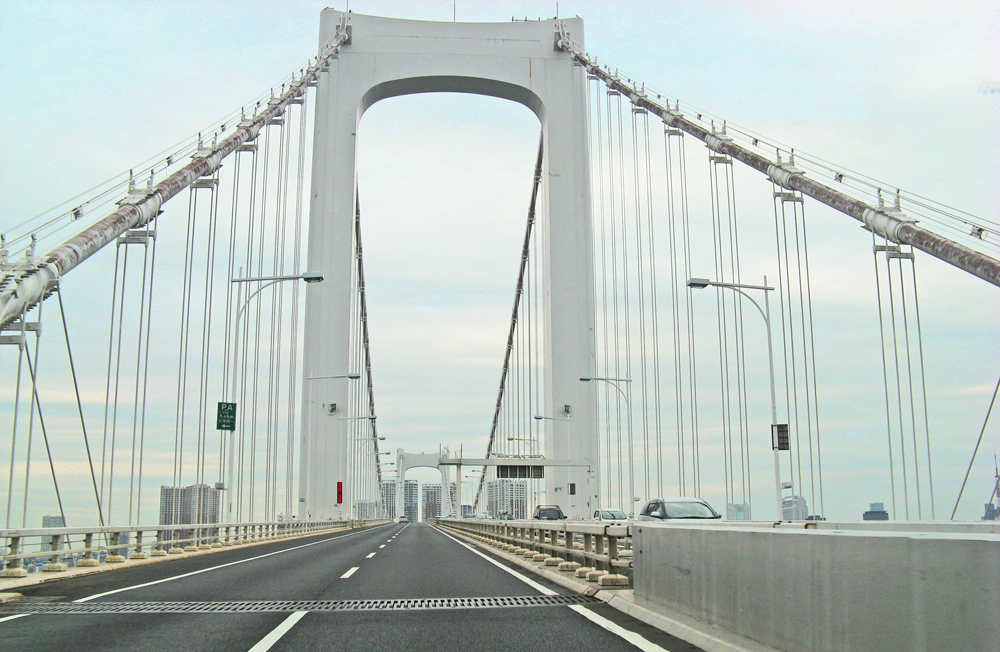
Rainbow Bridge

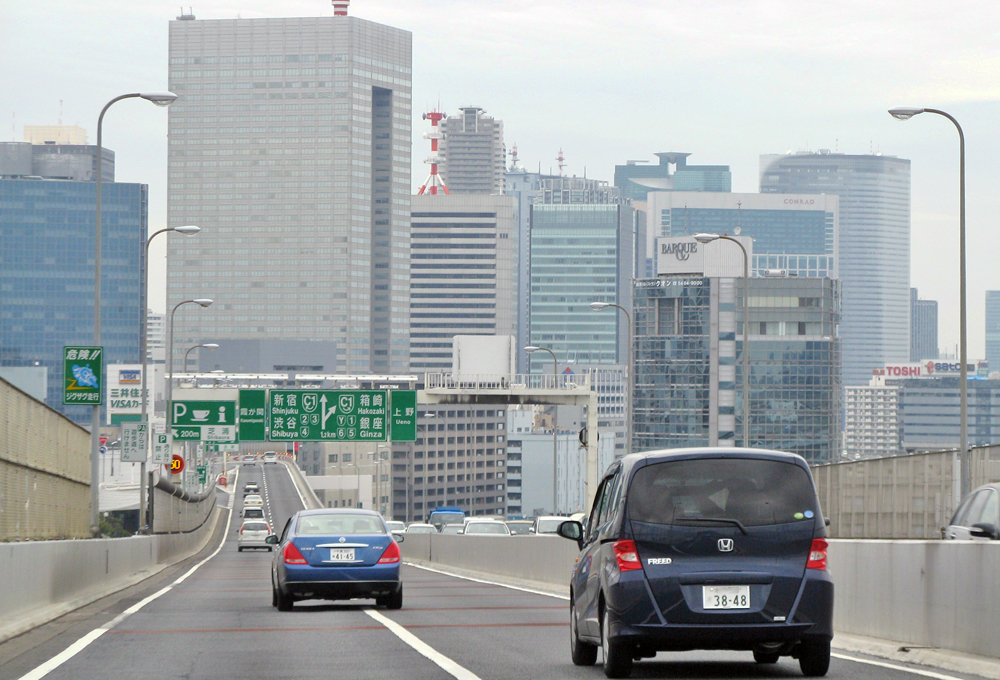
Near Shibaura Rest Area

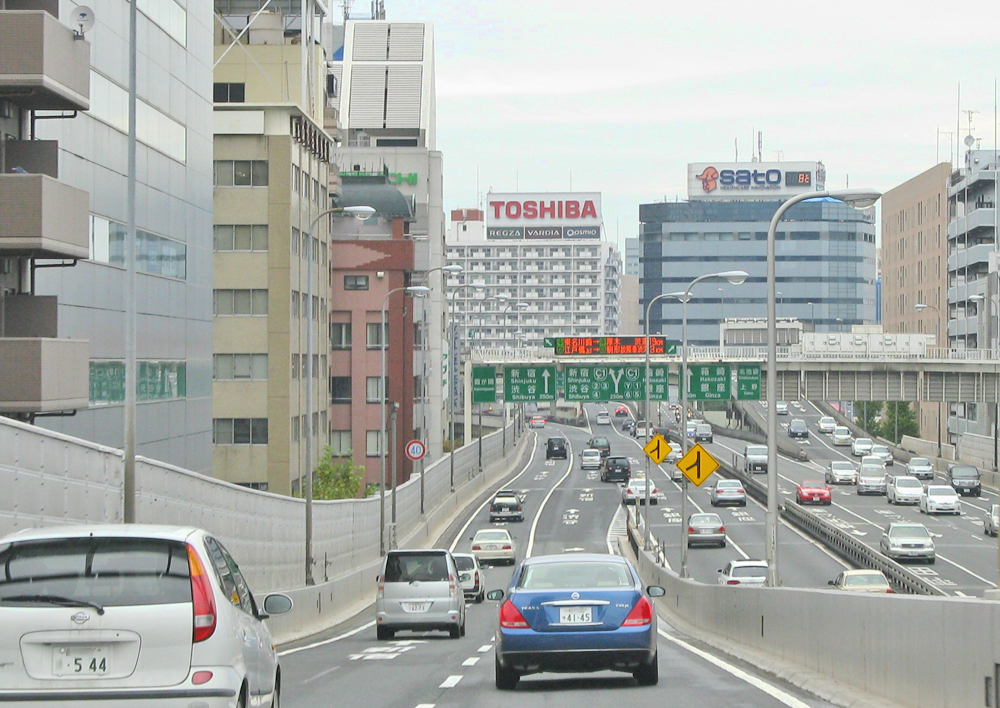
Shibaura JCT

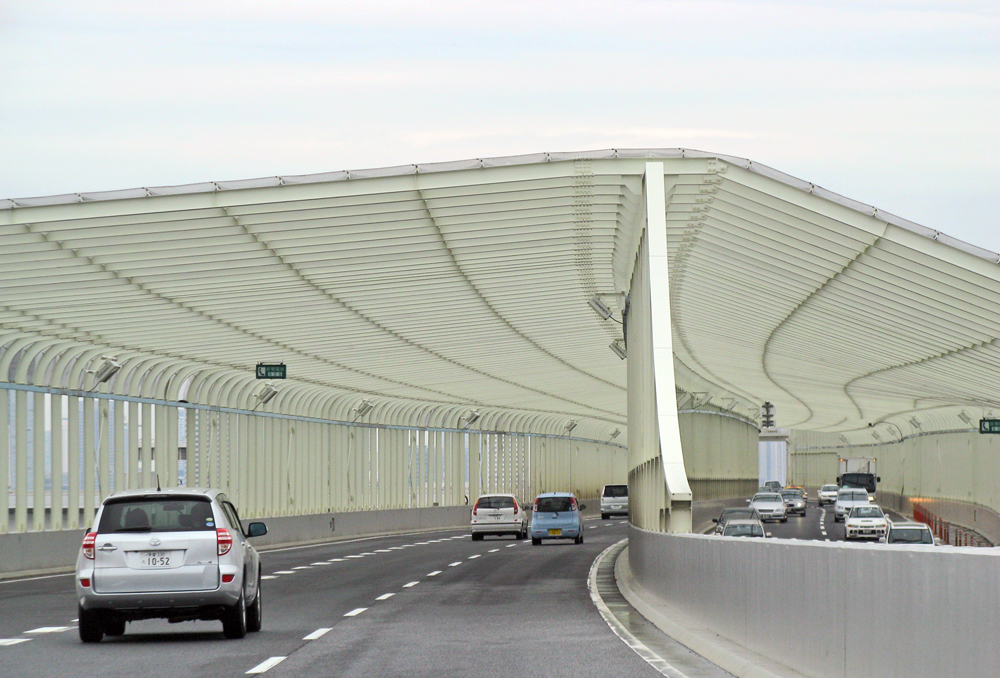
Safety barrier against golf balls

The Daiba Route (台場線, Daiba-sen), signed as Route 11, is one of the tolled routes of the Shuto Expressway system serving the Greater Tokyo Area. Route 11 runs from Shibaura Junction (with the Haneda Route) in Minato-ku and runs for 3.9 km through the Rainbow Bridge. Route 11 ends at the Ariake Junction connecting with the Bayshore Route in Kōtō-ku.

Originally, the route number was "12" in urban planning.

== Route description ==
It runs through Rainbow Bridge which is renowned for its scenery.

== History ==
The entirety of the Daiba Route was opened to traffic on 26 August 1993. Instead of being opened in phases, like many of the other routes in the Shuto Expressway network.

== Exit list ==
Municipality	Exit/interchange name	Destinations	Notes
Minato-ku	Shibaura JCT	Haneda Route	Accessible from outbound only
Minato-ku	Shibaura Rest Area		Accessible from inbound only
Minato-ku	Daiba		Outbound exit/inbound entrance
Kōtō-ku/Minato-ku	Ariake JCT	Bayshore Route	

== Appearances in media ==
- Wangan Midnight, a manga and anime series based on street racing on the Wangan.
- Wangan Midnight Maximum Tune, an arcade racing game taking place on the Wangan.
- Shutokō Battle (首都高, abbreviation for "Shuto Expressway") is a Genki game based on Wangan racing
- Shutokō Battle series, an arcade Wangan racing game
- In Cars 2, a portion of the Tokyo race goes over the Rainbow Bridge.
